= Phoenix metropolitan area =

Metropolitan statistical area in Arizona, US

Coordinates: 33.17°N 112.04°W

Phoenix metropolitan area Valley of the Sun
- Metropolitan statistical area
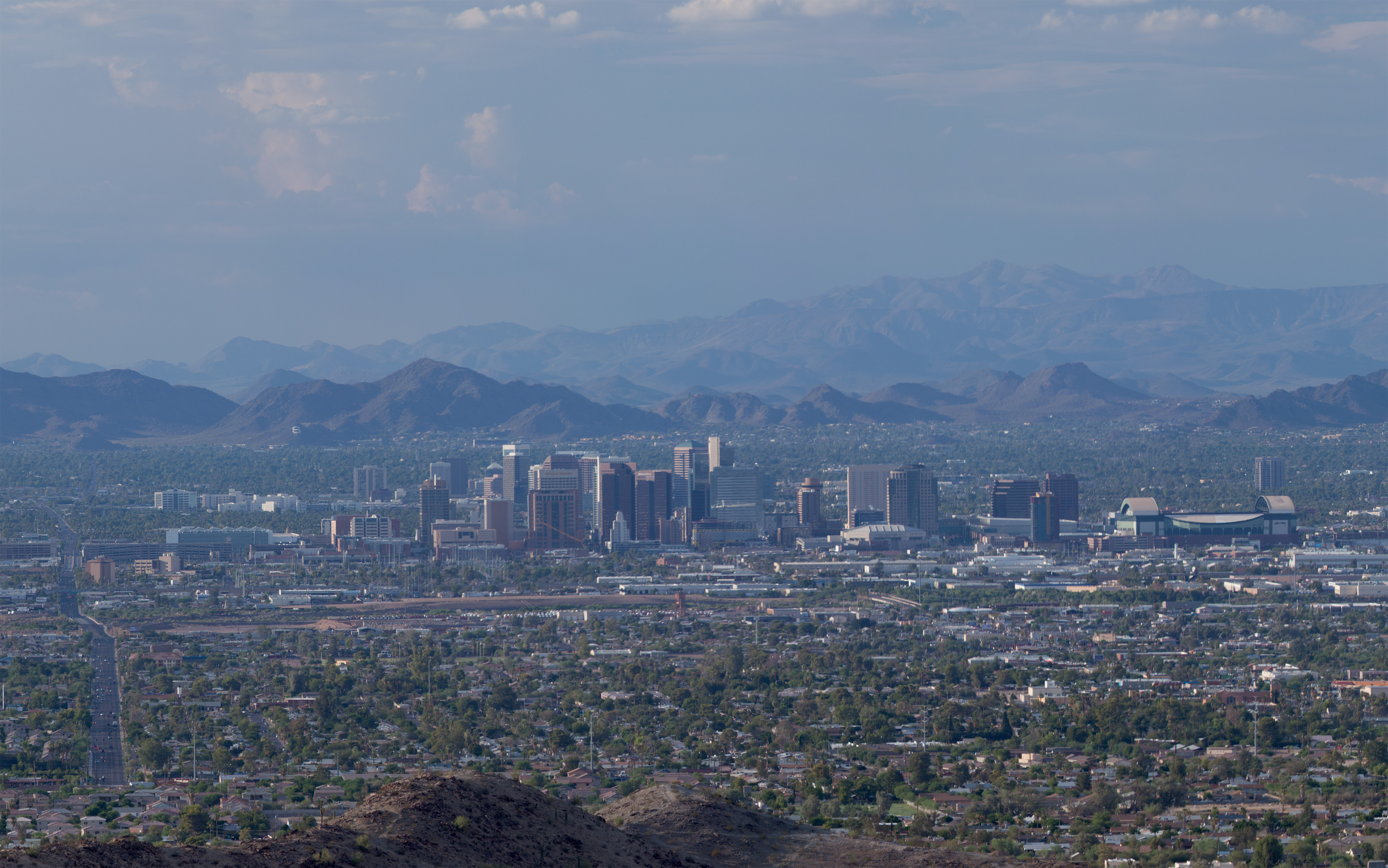
- Aerial view of Downtown Phoenix in July 2011
Interactive Map of Phoenix–Mesa, AZ CSA
City of Phoenix
City of Mesa
City of Chandler
Town of Gilbert
City of Glendale
City of Scottsdale
City of Peoria
City of Tempe
City of Surprise
Phoenix–Mesa–Chandler MSA (Remainder)
Payson µSA
- Country: United States
- State: Arizona
- Largest city: Phoenix
- Other Major Cities: Maricopa County; Mesa; Chandler; Gilbert; Glendale; Scottsdale; Peoria; Tempe; Surprise; Pinal County; Apache Junction; Casa Grande; Maricopa

Area
  - Metropolitan statistical area: 14,598.63 sq mi (37,810.27 km^{2})
  - Land: 14,565.76 sq mi (37,725.14 km^{2})
  - Water: 32.87 sq mi (85.13 km^{2})
  - Urban: 1,146.6 sq mi (2,969.6 km^{2})
- Highest elevation: 4,890 ft (1,490.5 m)
- Lowest elevation: 735.0 ft (224.03 m)

Population (Census 2020)
  - Metropolitan statistical area: 4,845,832
  - Density: 333/sq mi (128.5/km^{2})
  - Urban: 3,629,114
  - Urban density: 3,165/sq mi (1,222.1/km^{2})

GDP
  - Metropolitan statistical area: $398.129 billion (2023)
- Time zone: UTC−7 (MST)
- ZIP codes: 850xx to 853xx, 856xx
- Area codes: 623, 602, 480, 520, 928

The Phoenix metropolitan area, also known as the Valley of the Sun, Valley of the Sun Metroplex, the Salt River Valley, metro Phoenix, or locally, The Valley, is the largest metropolitan statistical area in the Southwestern United States, with its largest principal city being the city of Phoenix. It includes much of central Arizona. The United States Office of Management and Budget designates the area as the Phoenix–Mesa–Chandler Metropolitan Statistical Area (MSA), defining it as Maricopa and Pinal counties. It anchors the Arizona Sun Corridor megaregion along with the second-most populous metropolitan area in the state, the Tucson metropolitan area. The gross domestic product of the Phoenix metropolitan area was around $400 billion in 2023, 14th highest amongst metro areas in the United States.

As of the 2020 census, the two-county metropolitan area had 4,845,832 residents, making it the 11th largest metropolitan area in the nation by population. Metro Phoenix grew by 652,945 people from April 2010 to April 2020, making it one of the fastest growing metro areas in the country. This also contributed to the entire state's exceptional growth; the area is home to just over two-thirds of Arizona's population. The population of the Phoenix metropolitan area increased by 45.3% from 1990 through 2000, compared to the overall U.S. rate of 13.2%, helping make Arizona the second-fastest growing state in the nation in the 1990s behind Nevada. The 2000 census reported the population of the metropolitan area to be 3,251,876. Water insecurity and drought in conjunction with climate change have become a significant concern for the metropolitan area's future growth prospects.

== Combined Statistical Area ==
The Phoenix–Mesa combined statistical area (CSA) was designated in September 2018 by U.S. Office of Management and Budget (OMB) and by the Census Bureau which consists of the entirety of the counties of Maricopa, Pinal, and Gila. This includes the Phoenix metropolitan area and the Payson, AZ micropolitan statistical area.

As of April 1, 2020, the Phoenix–Mesa CSA had a population of 4,899,104, making it the fourteenth-most populous in the nation.

== Metropolitan Statistical Area ==
The Phoenix Metropolitan Area comprises Maricopa County (2020 population: 4,420,568) and Pinal County (2020 population: 425,264). It is officially designated by the US Census Bureau as the Phoenix–Mesa–Chandler, AZ Metropolitan Statistical Area. The total population for metropolitan Phoenix at the 2020 Census was 4,845,832.

The Phoenix Metropolitan Area is hundreds of miles away from any other metropolitan area of similar population size. For instance, the closest metropolitan area with almost the same population size is the Riverside-San Bernardino-Ontario, CA Metro Area, which is 300 miles away.

Table of nearby metropolitan areas to the Phoenix–Mesa–Chandler, AZ Metro Area
Metropolitan Area Name	Distance from Phoenix (miles)	Population (2020 Census)	Urban Density (2010 Pop. per Sq. Mile)
Phoenix–Mesa–Chandler, AZ Metro Area	0	4,845,832	3,165.2
Tucson, AZ Metro Area	105	1,043,433	2,385.4
Yuma, AZ Metro Area	155	203,881	2,299.9
Las Vegas–Henderson–Paradise, NV Metro Area	255	2,265,461	4,524.5
San Diego–Chula Vista–Carlsbad, CA Metro Area	300	3,298,634	4,037.0
Riverside–San Bernardino–Ontario, CA Metro Area	300	4,599,839	3,546.4
Albuquerque, NM Metro Area	330	916,528	2,958.5
El Paso, TX Metro Area	345	868,859	3,205.0
Los Angeles–Long Beach–Anaheim, CA Metro Area	360	13,200,998	6,999.3
Oxnard–Thousand Oaks–Ventura, CA Metro Area	410	843,843	
Bakersfield, CA Metro Area	420	909,235	3,785.0
Salt Lake City, UT Metro Area	505	1,257,936	3,675.1
Denver–Aurora–Lakewood, CO Metro Area	585	2,963,821	3,554.4

== Demographics ==
Historical population
Census	Pop.	Note	%±
1880	8,733		—
1890	15,237		74.5%
1900	28,236		85.3%
1910	43,533		54.2%
1920	105,706		142.8%
1930	173,051		63.7%
1940	215,034		24.3%
1950	374,961		74.4%
1960	726,183		93.7%
1970	1,039,144		43.1%
1980	1,600,093		54.0%
1990	2,238,480		39.9%
2000	3,251,876		45.3%
2010	4,192,887		28.9%
2020	4,845,832		15.6%
2025 (est.)	5,228,938		7.9%
U.S. Decennial Census; 1790–1960 1900–1990; 1990–2000 2010–2020

Population density in the Phoenix urban area

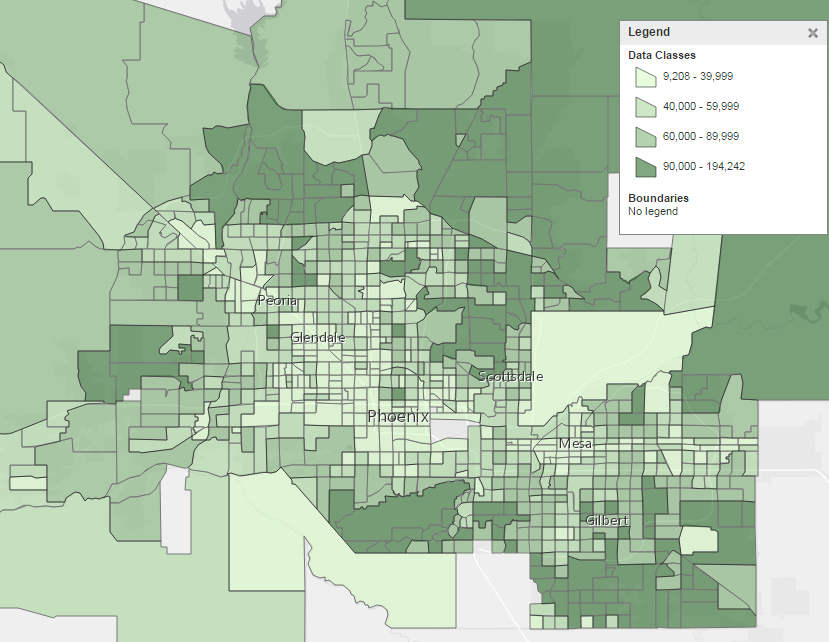
Median Household Income across metro Phoenix; the darker the green, the higher the income.

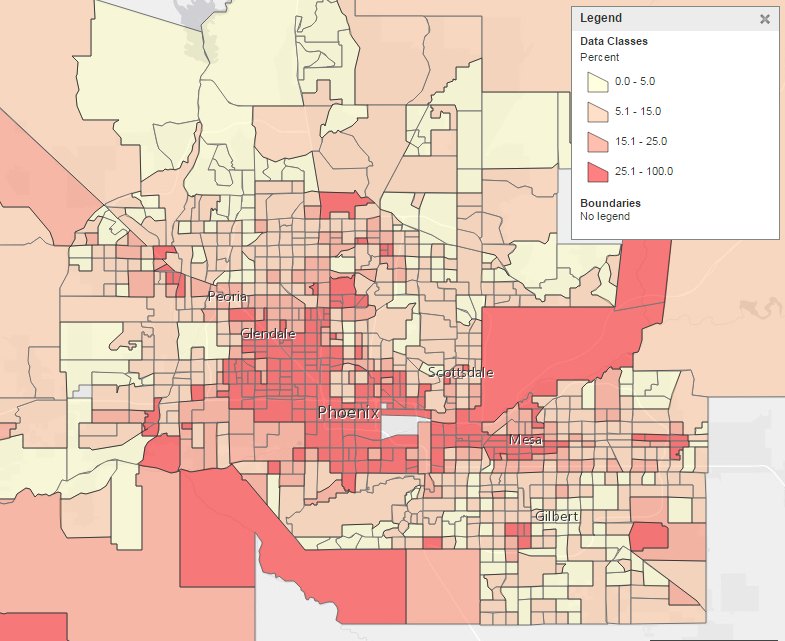
Percent of people living in poverty across Metro Phoenix; the darker the red, the higher the concentration of poverty

Map showing cities and highways in the Phoenix–Mesa–Chandler MSA, as defined by the U.S. Census as both Maricopa and Pinal counties.

As of the 2010 census, there were 4,192,887 people, 1,537,137 households, and 1,024,971 families residing within the MSA. The racial makeup of the MSA was 73.0% White (58.7% White Non-Hispanic), 5.0% Black, 3.3% Asian, 2.4% Native American or Alaska Native (virtually all Native American) and 16.2% of other or mixed race. 29.5% were Hispanic of any race.

In 2010 the median income for a household in the MSA was $50,385 and the median income for a family was $58,497. The per capita income was $24,809.

County	2025 Estimate	2020 Census	Change	Area	Density
Maricopa County	4,689,558	4,420,568	+6.08%	9,200.14 sq mi (23,828.3 km^{2})	510/sq mi (197/km^{2})
Pinal County	539,380	425,264	+26.83%	5,365.61 sq mi (13,896.9 km^{2})	101/sq mi (39/km^{2})
Gila County	53,801	53,272	+0.99%	4,795 sq mi (12,420 km^{2})	11/sq mi (4/km^{2})
Total	5,228,938	4,845,832	+7.91%	19,360.75 sq mi (50,144.1 km^{2})	270/sq mi (104/km^{2})

== Communities ==
The Office of Management and Budget (OMB) defines a metropolitan area as the core city plus its county and any nearby counties that are economically dependent on the core city. However, Arizona has relatively large counties and a harsh, rugged desert landscape. For these reasons, much of the land that is part of the Metropolitan Statistical Area is rural or completely uninhabited. The core part of the Phoenix Metropolitan Area is the Phoenix–Mesa, AZ Urban Area, which is far smaller than the Metropolitan Statistical Area.

The following is a list of places in Metro Phoenix categorized based on the United States Census Bureau 2025 population estimates. No population estimates are released for census-designated places (CDPs), which are marked with an asterisk (*). These places are categorized based on their 2020 Census population. Places designated "principal cities" by the OMB are italicized.

=== Cities and suburbs ===
Places with 500,000+ inhabitants

- Phoenix (1,665,481)
- Mesa (513,656)

Places with 250,000–499,999 inhabitants

- Gilbert (287,525)
- Chandler (278,748)
- Glendale (260,572)

Places with 150,000–249,999 inhabitants

- Scottsdale (243,006)
- Peoria (200,881)
- Tempe (190,571)
- Surprise (175,304)

Places with 75,000–149,999 inhabitants

- Buckeye (125,445)
- Goodyear (125,359)
- Avondale (100,983)
- San Tan Valley (99,894)
- Queen Creek (89,770)
- Maricopa (78,362)

Places with 30,000–74,999 inhabitants

- Casa Grande (69,753)
- Apache Junction (45,672)
- Sun City* (39,931)
- El Mirage (35,820)

Places with 10,000–29,999 inhabitants

- Sun City West* (25,806)
- Florence (25,222)
- Fountain Hills (23,625)
- Anthem* (23,190)
- Eloy (19,967)
- Coolidge (19,959)
- New River* (17,290)
- Sun Lakes* (14,868)
- Saddlebrooke* (12,574)
- Paradise Valley (12,251)
- Gold Canyon* (11,404)

Places with fewer than 10,000 inhabitants

- Arizona City* (9,868)
- Tolleson (9,224)
- Wickenburg (8,305)
- Youngtown (7,039)
- Litchfield Park (6,727)
- Citrus Park* (5,194)
- Cave Creek (5,160)
- Guadalupe (5,093)
- Carefree (3,600)
- Sacaton* (3,254)
- San Manuel* (3,114)
- Oracle* (3,051)
- Red Rock* (2,625)
- Superior (2,611)
- Rio Verde* (2,210)
- Kearny (1,849)
- Gila Bend (1,816)
- Casa Blanca* (1,727)
- Blackwater* (1,190)
- Mammoth (1,149)
- Komatke* (1,013)
- Queen Valley* (967)
- Ak-Chin Village* (884)
- Maricopa Colony* (854)
- St. Johns* (690)
- Wittmann* (684)
- Upper Santan Village* (665)
- Gila Crossing* (636)
- Stotonic Village* (610)
- Cactus Forest* (606)
- Dudleyville* (597)
- Sacaton Flats Village* (576)
- Aguila* (565)
- Stanfield* (558)
- Circle City* (522)
- Goodyear Village* (463)
- Lower Santan Village* (437)
- Wet Camp Village* (300)
- Top-of-the-World* (274)
- Sacate Village* (260)
- Picacho* (250)
- Chuichu* (240)
- Morristown* (186)
- Arlington* (150)
- Sweet Water Village* (123)
- Theba* (111)
- Vaiva Vo* (93)
- Campo Bonito* (83)
- Kaka* (83)
- Wintersburg* (51)
- Santa Cruz* (39)
- Kohatk* (37)
- Tonopah* (23)
- Tat Momoli* (18)

== Geography ==
As of 2020, the Phoenix Metropolitan area consists of Maricopa and Pinal counties, comprising a total area of about 14,600 square miles. Because of the size of counties in Arizona, even though Maricopa and Pinal counties together contain nearly 4.9 million people, most of the area is uninhabited, which gives the MSA an extremely low density compared to other major MSAs in the nation.

The average elevation in the city itself is about 1,100 feet (340 m), with the highest point being Camelback Mountain 2,704 feet (824 m).The highest point in the two county area is 7,657 feet (2,334 m) in the Four Peaks mountain range.

=== Climate ===
Metropolitan Phoenix is notable for its warm, desert climate. On average, the area receives about 9 inches of rain annually, with less than 1 inch of snow every decade. In total, the region will see about 32 days of measurable precipitation each year. The MSA is one of the sunniest major metropolitan areas, receiving 295 days of sunshine, compared to the national average of 205. The average July high is about 104 °F (40 °C), with the average January low being about 36 °F (3 °C), still above freezing. Bestplaces gives Metropolitan Phoenix a comfort index (Note: The Comfort Index uses a combination of afternoon summer temperature and humidity to closely predict the effect that the humidity will have on people. Higher values indicate a more comfortable climate.) of 44/100, which is also the national average.

Below is a chart showing climate data collected from Sky Harbor Airport. Due to the vast area covered by the MSA, climates vary throughout the valley.

Climate data for Phoenix Int'l, Arizona (1991–2020 normals, (Note: Mean monthly maxima and minima (i.e. the highest and lowest temperature readings during an entire month or year) calculated based on data at said location from 1991 to 2020.) extremes 1895–present) (Note: Official records for Phoenix kept at downtown August 1895 to September 1953, and at Sky Harbor Int'l since October 1953. For more information see ThreadEx.)
Month	Jan	Feb	Mar	Apr	May	Jun	Jul	Aug	Sep	Oct	Nov	Dec	Year
Record high °F (°C)	88 (31)	92 (33)	105 (41)	105 (41)	114 (46)	122 (50)	121 (49)	118 (48)	117 (47)	113 (45)	99 (37)	88 (31)	122 (50)
Mean maximum °F (°C)	78.2 (25.7)	82.1 (27.8)	90.4 (32.4)	99.0 (37.2)	105.7 (40.9)	112.7 (44.8)	114.6 (45.9)	113.2 (45.1)	108.9 (42.7)	100.7 (38.2)	88.9 (31.6)	77.7 (25.4)	115.7 (46.5)
Mean daily maximum °F (°C)	67.6 (19.8)	70.8 (21.6)	78.1 (25.6)	85.5 (29.7)	94.5 (34.7)	104.2 (40.1)	106.5 (41.4)	105.1 (40.6)	100.4 (38.0)	89.2 (31.8)	76.5 (24.7)	66.2 (19.0)	87.1 (30.6)
Daily mean °F (°C)	56.8 (13.8)	59.9 (15.5)	66.3 (19.1)	73.2 (22.9)	82.0 (27.8)	91.4 (33.0)	95.5 (35.3)	94.4 (34.7)	89.2 (31.8)	77.4 (25.2)	65.1 (18.4)	55.8 (13.2)	75.6 (24.2)
Mean daily minimum °F (°C)	46.0 (7.8)	49.0 (9.4)	54.5 (12.5)	60.8 (16.0)	69.5 (20.8)	78.6 (25.9)	84.5 (29.2)	83.6 (28.7)	78.1 (25.6)	65.6 (18.7)	53.7 (12.1)	45.3 (7.4)	64.1 (17.8)
Mean minimum °F (°C)	36.0 (2.2)	40.0 (4.4)	44.4 (6.9)	50.1 (10.1)	58.4 (14.7)	69.4 (20.8)	74.4 (23.6)	74.2 (23.4)	68.3 (20.2)	53.8 (12.1)	42.0 (5.6)	35.4 (1.9)	33.8 (1.0)
Record low °F (°C)	16 (−9)	24 (−4)	25 (−4)	35 (2)	39 (4)	49 (9)	63 (17)	58 (14)	47 (8)	34 (1)	27 (−3)	22 (−6)	16 (−9)
Average precipitation inches (mm)	0.87 (22)	0.87 (22)	0.83 (21)	0.22 (5.6)	0.13 (3.3)	0.02 (0.51)	0.91 (23)	0.93 (24)	0.57 (14)	0.56 (14)	0.57 (14)	0.74 (19)	7.22 (183)
Average precipitation days (≥ 0.01 in)	3.8	4.1	3.1	1.5	1.0	0.5	3.9	4.6	2.5	2.2	2.2	4.0	33.4
Average relative humidity (%)	50.9	44.4	39.3	27.8	21.9	19.4	31.6	36.2	35.6	36.9	43.8	51.8	36.6
Average dew point °F (°C)	32.4 (0.2)	32.2 (0.1)	32.9 (0.5)	31.6 (−0.2)	34.3 (1.3)	39.0 (3.9)	56.1 (13.4)	58.3 (14.6)	52.3 (11.3)	43.0 (6.1)	35.8 (2.1)	33.1 (0.6)	40.1 (4.5)
Mean monthly sunshine hours	256.0	257.2	318.4	353.6	401.0	407.8	378.5	360.8	328.6	308.9	256.0	244.8	3,871.6
Percentage possible sunshine	81	84	86	90	93	95	86	87	89	88	82	79	87
Average ultraviolet index	3.1	4.4	6.6	8.5	9.7	10.9	11.0	10.1	8.3	5.6	3.7	2.7	7.0
Source 1: NOAA (dew points, relative humidity, and sun 1961–1990), Weather.com
Source 2: UV Index Today (1995 to 2022)

== Economy ==
Metropolitan Phoenix has historically been the center of the state's economy. As with the state of Arizona, the area relied on the 5 C's (copper, cattle, climate, citrus, and cotton) for its economic growth and expansion. However, after World War II, the area entered the manufacturing industry, which spurred the growth of what would eventually be one of the largest urban areas in the nation. Currently, the two largest industries are manufacturing and tourism. About 10 million people visit from other states and Canada each year, due to the area's mild winters and long, sunny days. The technology and service industries currently account for almost 77% of total employment in the region. As well as a strong tourism industry, the Phoenix area has a significant business sector. Several Fortune 500 and Fortune 1000 companies have their international headquarters in the area, including Avnet, PetSmart, Apollo Education Group, Republic Services, ON Semiconductor, Insight Enterprises, and Sprouts Farmers Market. Other Fortune 500 companies with significant presence include Banner Health, the state's largest private employer, American Airlines, which merged with Tempe-based US Airways, American Express, Wells Fargo, Boeing, and Intel, which has a large regional campus in Chandler.

The Metropolitan Area ranks 5th in the nation in economic growth, which is a major comeback from the recession. The unemployment rate of the area is 5.3%, lower than the national rate of 6.3%. It also has slightly higher recent job growth (2.0% compared to 1.2%) and higher projected job growth (38.7% compared to 36.1%). Although the area has significantly higher sales tax rates compared with the nation as a whole (8.3% to 6.0%), income tax rates are lower than the national average (3.4% to 4.7%). The largest occupation by population is in the office/administrative sector, comprising more than a quarter of all jobs in the region.

== Infrastructure ==
=== Transportation ===
==== Freeways and expressways ====
Freeway map of the Phoenix Area

The Phoenix Metropolitan Area is served by several controlled-access freeways, including:

- I-10 (Papago Freeway, Maricopa Freeway)
- I-17 (Black Canyon Freeway, Maricopa Freeway)
- US 60 (Maricopa Freeway, Superstition Freeway)
- SR 51 (Piestewa Freeway)
- SR 143 (Hohokam Expressway)
- Loop 101 (Agua Fria, Pima, Price Freeway)
- Loop 202 (Red Mountain, Santan, South Mountain Freeway)
- Loop 303 (Estrella Freeway)

New freeways are planned in the future, either through upgrades of existing roads such as SR 74, SR 85, and Northern Parkway; or through the construction of new freeways where no road existed before such as SR 24 and SR 30.

==== Arterial roads ====
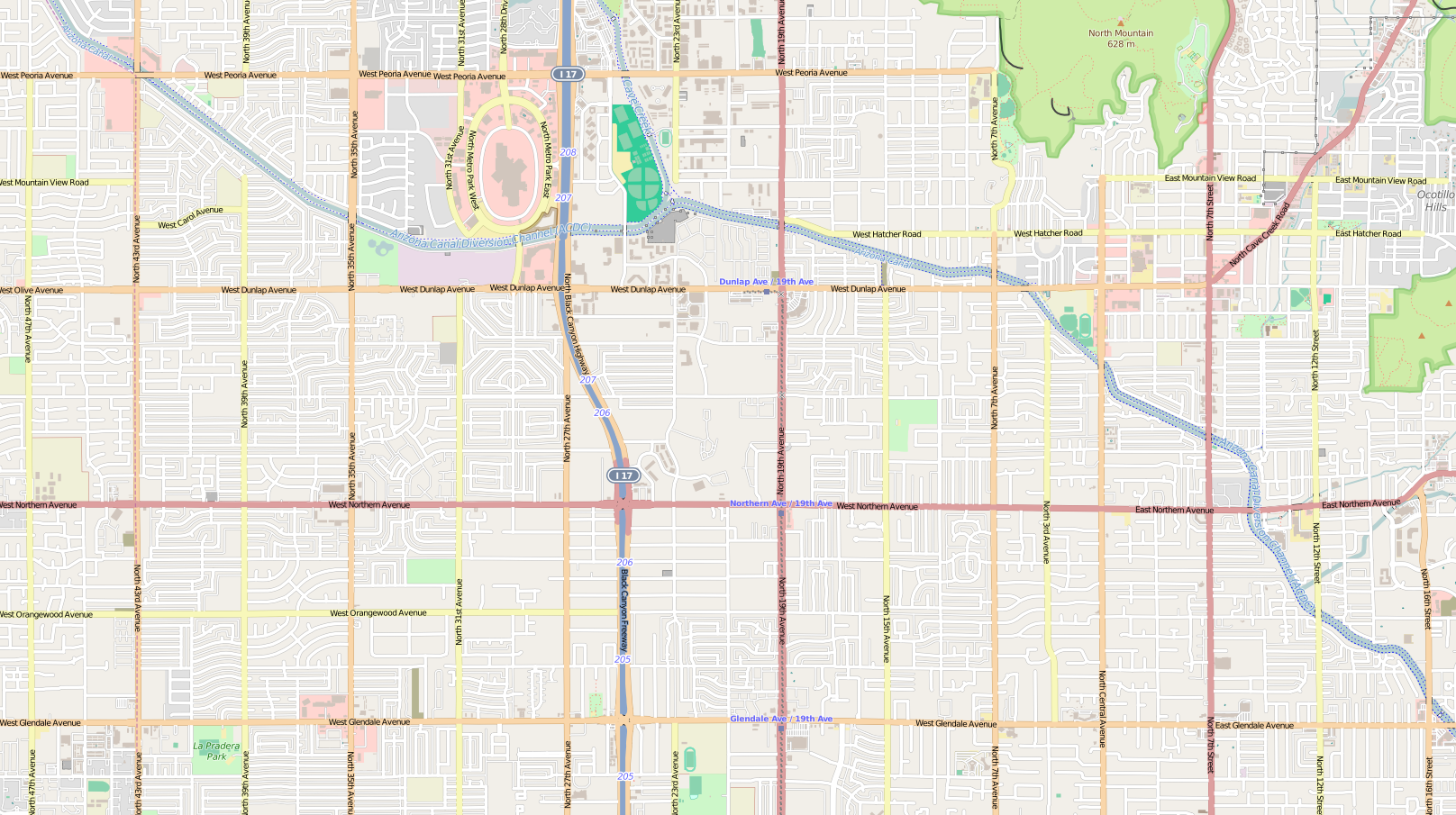
Arterial streets in Central Phoenix

Most of the arterial roads in the Phoenix metropolitan area are laid out on a regular grid, following the section lines established in the Public Land Survey System. As a result, arterial roads in cities that had once been geographically separate may have been given different names while occupying the same section line. When these roads were extended to accommodate the growth in the area they eventually merged into a single road while the previous segments retained their existing names. This results in several cases of a road abruptly changing names; for example, Dunlap Avenue in Phoenix becomes Olive Avenue west of 43rd Avenue, in Glendale.

Another quirk of a grid system based upon the Public Land Survey System is due to the occasional corrections in the grid caused by the curvature of the Earth. This results in arterial roadways deviating slightly from a straight line, as can be seen in many locations where roads abruptly curve either just north or just south of Baseline Road to follow a new section line.

The majority of the cities in the metropolitan area, as well as unincorporated areas in Maricopa County, observe the addressing system employed by the city of Phoenix. A number of cities, however, retain their own addressing systems with differing reference points, creating the potential for multiple instances of a house number being found on the same named road.

In terms of numbering systems, some roads that continue through multiple cities will switch numbering conventions several times. Broadway Road, for example, starts and stops multiple times, passing through Goodyear, Avondale, Phoenix, Tempe, Mesa, and Apache Junction, each with their own reference point for address numbering. Though the street does not curve, the direction changes from west to east in each city and back again when moving from one city to the next, causing considerable overlap in numbers.

==== Street numbering systems ====
Most communities in Maricopa County use the Phoenix-County numbering system, with the point of origin at Central Avenue and Washington Street. In the Phoenix-County system, north-south numbered roads labeled "avenue", "drive", and "lane" are West of Central Avenue, while those labeled "street", "place" and "way" are east of Central Avenue. Starting with 579th Avenue in the west near Tonopah the avenues count down with approximately 8 numbers per mile to 19th Avenue and count up again to from 16th Street to 228th Street near Queen Creek in the east. They go, in order from west to east (although not all necessarily exist):

- 2nd Avenue – 1st Dale – 1st Glen – 1st Lane – 1st Drive – 1st Avenue
- Central Avenue
- 1st Street – 1st Place – 1st Way – 1st Terrace – 1st Run – 2nd Street

This has been a source of confusion for a few newcomers, who might end up, for example, at 91st Avenue and Thunderbird Road, when in fact they intended to go to 91st Street and Thunderbird Road, between 30 minutes and an hour away from one another depending on traffic.

One beneficial quality of this arrangement for unfamiliar travelers is that the major north-south arterial roads are rarely similarly named; the "avenue" arterials in the West Valley are all odd-numbered and the "street" arterials in the East Valley are even-numbered, with the exception of 7th Ave. & 7th St., both being major roadways running parallel and each one-half mile from Central Ave.

Communities in Maricopa County that have their own street numbering systems include:

Community	Point of Origin
Apache Junction (Pinal County)	Idaho Road & Junction Drive
Avondale (historic downtown only)	Central Avenue & Western Avenue
Buckeye (historic downtown only)	Monroe Avenue & 1st Street
Chandler	Commonwealth Place & Arizona Avenue
Gilbert	Gilbert Road & Elliot Road
Litchfield Park	Old Litchfield Road & Wigwam Boulevard
Mesa	Center Street & Main Street
Goodyear (historic district only)	Western Avenue & Litchfield Road
Tempe	Mill Avenue & the Salt River
Wickenburg	Center Street & Frontier Street
Wittmann (core area only)	Center Street & Grand Avenue

Additional confusion can be encountered in Mesa in its urban core, with east-west numbered avenues and drives counting down from 11th Avenue north towards Main Street), and numbered streets and places counting down from 11th Place south towards Main Street. Then, in the eastern part of the city, north-south streets and places count up from 22nd St east of Gilbert Rd, to 112th Street on the Apache Junction border. Numerous trailer parks inside the city limits run their own contradictory variations of the numbered street system.

Most communities in Pinal County use the Pinal County street numbering system, whose point of origin is at SR 287 and 11 Mile Corner Road (the intersection of which is known as "11 Mile Corner"). Exceptions include:

Community	Point of origin
Apache Junction	Idaho Road & Junction Drive
Casa Grande	Ash Avenue & Center Street
Coolidge	Central Avenue & Union Pacific Railroad
Eloy	Alsdorf Road & Main Street
Florence	Butte Avenue & Main Street
Queen Creek	(follows Maricopa County)
Stanfield	SR 84 & Stanfield Road

Apache Junction continues Mesa's convention of numbered north-south street names by having the sequence continue east from 112th St while simultaneously having east-west numbered avenues south of Apache Trail and east-west numbered streets north of Apache Trail.

==== Traffic safety ====
In terms of safety, the Phoenix–Mesa–Chandler, AZ metropolitan area has been ranked 16th most dangerous in the USA, based on its Pedestrian Danger Index, computed on the share of local commuters who walk to work and the most recent data on pedestrian deaths as found in a 2016 report released by Smart Growth America.

==== Rail ====
Amtrak serves the Phoenix metropolitan area with their Sunset Limited and Texas Eagle trains—both of which stop in Maricopa, located about 40 miles south of downtown Phoenix. Amtrak's Stagecoach Express provides Amtrak Thruway service from Maricopa station to both Phoenix Sky Harbor International Airport and Tempe station. Amtrak also provides additional Thruway Motorcoach service from Phoenix Sky Harbor International Airport to Flagstaff station, which is served by the Southwest Chief.

Amtrak's Los Angeles-New Orleans Sunset Limited served the city of Phoenix directly from 1971 until it was rerouted on June 2, 1996, to a more southerly route between Tucson and Yuma, Arizona, in order to accommodate the Union Pacific Railroad's desire to abandon a portion of its Phoenix-to-Yuma "West Line." This made Phoenix one of the largest cities in the nation without direct passenger service.

A light rail system (dubbed the "METRO Light Rail") runs more than 20 miles from suburban Mesa, through Tempe and into Phoenix, traveling through the downtown area, offering access to Phoenix Sky Harbor International Airport and linking two of the four metro area campuses of Arizona State University. The light rail began public operation on December 27, 2008, and it was projected to accommodate 26,000 boardings a day, or more than 8 million boardings in its first year. Valley Metro Rail boardings has experienced constant growth since the beginning. In the year 2012, the light rail boarded just over 14 million people.

Many expansions to the METRO system are currently in the early planning stages, and others are under construction. The Central Mesa extension project, which extends the Main Street line 2 1/2 miles from Sycamore to Mesa Drive in Downtown Mesa, finished construction and opened on August 22, 2015. The Northwest rail project opened March 2016. The project extended the 19th Avenue track from its former terminus at Montebello Ave to Dunlap Avenue, 3 miles north. Another Mesa extension added 2 miles of rail and opened in May 2019, with service reaching Gilbert Road and Main Street. In January 2024, the northern end was extended further, to the Metro Parkway stop at the former Metrocenter shopping mall. In June 2025, the biggest change to the Light Rail system was opened, the South Central Extension. The extension added nearly 5 miles going south of Central Phoenix along Central Avenue, to Baseline Road. This extension made the Light Rail into a two-line system, with A line going from Central Phoenix to Downtown Mesa, and the B line from Metro Parkway to Baseline and Central. More extensions are funded, with further projects being studied for feasibility.

==== Aviation ====
In 2023, Phoenix Sky Harbor International Airport was the 33rd busiest passenger facility in the world and the 14th busiest in the United States, with more than 48 million total passengers. With two active terminal buildings encompassing 117 gates, more than 25 airlines offer daily non-stop flights to destinations throughout the world.

Phoenix-Mesa Gateway Airport began commercial passenger flights in 2004. The airport provides service to over 40 destinations.

There are several municipal and regional airports in the metropolitan area that are not used by commercial airlines for passenger flights. They include, but are not limited to, Glendale Airport, Phoenix Deer Valley Airport, Phoenix Goodyear Airport, Scottsdale Airport, Falcon Field, Chandler Municipal Airport, Buckeye Airport, Phoenix Regional Airport, Pleasant Valley Airport, Estrella Sailport, Stellar Airpark, Skyranch at Carefree, Gila River Memorial Airport, Pegasus Airpark.

== See also ==
- 2014 Arizona flood
- Salt River Valley
- List of historic properties in Phoenix, Arizona
- List of hospitals in Phoenix
