= Arizona's 2nd congressional district =

U.S. House district for Arizona

Coordinates: 31°54′59″N 109°56′19″W

- Interactive map of district boundaries since January 3, 2023
- Representative: Eli Crane; R–Oro Valley
- Area: 58,970 mi^{2} (152,700 km^{2})
- Distribution: 50.6% urban; 49.4% rural
- Population (2025): 861,404
- Median household income: $71,538
- Ethnicity: 55.3% White; 20.4% Native American; 16.9% Hispanic; 3.6% Two or more races; 2.1% Black; 1.2% Asian; 0.5% other
- Cook PVI: R+7

Arizona's 2nd congressional district is a congressional district located in the U.S. state of Arizona. The district is in the north eastern part of the state and includes Apache, Coconino, Gila, Navajo, and Yavapai counties in their entirety and portions of Graham, Maricopa, Mohave, and Pinal counties. The largest city in the district is Flagstaff.

Before January 2023, Arizona's 2nd district was located in the southeastern corner of the state and included Cochise and eastern Pima counties, drawing most of its population from the city of Tucson. The majority of that district was renumbered as the 6th district, while the 2nd was redrawn to essentially take over what was the 1st district from 2003 to 2023.

The district includes 12 Indian reservations including the Hualapai, Havasupai, Hopi, Navajo, San Carlos Apache, and White Mountain Apache peoples. 22% of the district's citizens are Native American.

== History ==
When Arizona was divided into congressional districts for the first time after the 1950 census, the 2nd district comprised the entire state outside of the Phoenix area. Arizona gained a third seat after the 1960 census, and the 2nd was cut back to roughly the southern third of the state, stretching border-to-border from New Mexico to California. It ran along the entire length of the border with Mexico. By far the district's largest city was Tucson. The next largest city was Yuma, in the far west. After a mid-decade redistricting in 1967, the district was pushed slightly to the north, picking up a portion of southern Phoenix. This configuration remained largely unchanged until the 1980 census, when much of eastern Tucson was drawn into the new 5th district.

The 2nd district remained based in southern Arizona until the 2000 census, when Arizona picked up two districts. At that time, the old 2nd district essentially became the new 7th district, while most of the old 3rd district became the new 2nd district. Located in the northwestern corner of the state, it stretched into the western suburbs of Phoenix, known as the West Valley. It consisted of all of Peoria (within the exception of the portion of that city within Yavapai County) and Surprise, most of Glendale and much of western Phoenix in Maricopa County, all of Mohave County, and the Hopi Nation in Navajo and Coconino counties.

The size and diversity of the 2nd district (it included nearly all of the northwestern portion of the state) made it appear rural on a map. However, over 90 percent of its population lived in the strongly conservative West Valley, historically a fairly safe Republican area.

The odd shape of the district was indicative of the use of gerrymandering in its construction. The unusual division was not, however, drawn to favor politicians, but was due to historic tensions between the Hopi and the Navajo Native American tribes. Since tribal boundary disputes are a federal matter, it was long believed inappropriate to include both tribes' reservations in the same congressional district. However, the Hopi reservation is completely surrounded by the Navajo reservation. In order to comply with current Arizona redistricting laws, some means of connection was required that avoided including large portions of Navajo land, hence the narrow riverine connection.

George W. Bush carried the district in 2004 with 61% of the vote. John McCain won the district in 2008 with 60.75% of the vote to Barack Obama's 38.07%. During the 2008 Super Tuesday Arizona Democratic primary, the district was won by Hillary Clinton with 54.52% of the vote, while Obama received 35.62% and John Edwards took in 7.43%. In the Arizona Republican primary, the 2nd district was won by favorite son McCain with 49.51%, while Mitt Romney received 29.51% and Mike Huckabee took in 10.46% of the district's vote.

After the 2012 census, the bulk of the Maricopa County portion of the old 2nd became the 8th district, while the new 2nd district took in most of the territory of the old 8th district. That district, in turn, had been the 5th district from 1983 to 2003. In the 2014 midterms, the district was the last U.S. House race in the country to be decided, as the official recount began on December 1 due to Republican Martha McSally leading incumbent Democratic congressman Ron Barber by fewer than 200 votes. Ultimately, Barber lost to McSally by 167 votes.

=== Main industries ===
Primary job fields of the people in the district include agriculture, ranching, livestock, mining, and tourism. The main irrigated crops are cotton, wheat, corn, grain, sorghum, alfalfa, hay, apples, peaches, cherries, grapes, pistachios, pecans, lettuce, chili peppers, and other vegetables. The area has a multitude of U-pick vegetable farms and orchards, including several organic farms. Greenhouse tomato and cucumber operations have been completed in the past few years with much success. In Cochise County there is the U.S. Army base Fort Huachuca and numerous military-industrial companies. In suburban and urban areas, Walmarts are the most abundant superstores.

=== Schools ===
Located within the district are Northern Arizona University, Diné College, Yavapai College, Prescott College, and Embry–Riddle Aeronautical University, and Coconino Community College.

=== Tourism and recreation ===
Tourism is an important industry as the district has numerous natural wonders, national forests, parks, and conservation areas. Grand Canyon and Petrified Forest National Parks highlight the public lands in the district. Other prominent tourist attractions include Lake Powell, Sedona, Meteor Crater , and the self-proclaimed "World's Oldest Rodeo". Hiking, camping, fishing, and boating can be found throughout the region.

The Apache-Sitgraves, Coconino, Kaibab, Prescott, and Tonto National forests are most or partially in the 2nd district. The sacred Oak Flat site is also within the district.

== Composition ==
For the 118th and successive Congresses (based on redistricting following the 2020 census), the district contains the following counties and communities:

Apache County (39)
All 39 communities

Coconino County (35)
All 35 communities

Gila County (51)
All 51 communities

Graham County (2)
Bylas, Peridot (shared with Gila County)

Maricopa County (4)
Gila Crossing, Komatke, Maricopa Colony, St. Johns

Mohave County (4)
Grand Canyon West, Kaibab, Moccasin, Peach Springs

Navajo County (49)
All 49 communities

Pinal County (26)
Ak-Chin Village, Blackwater, Cactus Forest, Casa Blanca, Casa Grande (part; also 6th), Coolidge, Dudleyville, Florence, Gold Canyon (part; also 5th), Goodyear Village, Kearny, Lower Santan Village, Maricopa, Queen Valley, Sacate Village, Sacaton, Sacaton Flats Village, Santa Cruz, Stanfield, Stotonic Village, Sweet Water Village, Superior, Top-of-the-World (shared with Gila County), Upper Santan Village, Wet Camp Village, Winkelman

Yavapai County (28)
All 28 communities

== Recent election results from statewide races ==
Year	Office	Results
2003–2013 Boundaries
2004	President	Bush 61.5% - 38.0%
2008	President	McCain 60.6% - 38.2%
2010	Senate	McCain 65.4% - 27.9%
2010	Governor	Brewer 63.0% - 33.9%
2010	Secretary of State	Bennett 66.4% - 33.5%
2010	Attorney General	Horne 58.5% - 41.3%
2010	Treasurer	Ducey 58.8% - 34.0%
2013–2023 Boundaries
2008	President	McCain 49.8% - 48.9%
2012	President	Romney 49.9% - 48.4%
2012	Senate	Carmona 51.5% - 45.0%
2014	Governor	Ducey 48.7% - 47.0%
2016	President	Clinton 49.6% - 44.7%
2016	Senate	McCain 48.8% - 45.6%
2018	Senate	Sinema 52.6% - 45.2%
2018	Governor	Ducey 51.6% - 46.1%
2018	Attorney General	Contreras 54.2% - 45.6%
2020	President	Biden 54.5% - 43.9%
2020	Senate (Spec.)	Kelly 55.7% - 44.3%
2023–2033 Boundaries
2016	President	Trump 51% - 41%
2018	Senate	McSally 50% - 47%
2018	Governor	Ducey 58% - 39%
2020	President	Trump 53% - 45%
2020	Senate (Spec.)	McSally 53% - 47%
2022	Senate	Masters 51% - 46%
2022	Governor	Lake 54% - 45%
2022	Secretary of State	Finchem 53% - 47%
2022	Attorney General	Hamadeh 54% - 46%
2022	Treasurer	Yee 59% - 41%
2024	President	Trump 57% - 42%
2024	Senate	Lake 53% - 45%

== List of members representing the district ==
Starting with the 1948 elections, Arizona began using separate districts to elect its members to the House of Representatives rather than using a general ticket due to having gained a second seat in the House with the data from 1940 Census.

Representative	Party	Term	Cong ress(es)	Electoral history	Geography and counties
District created January 3, 1949
Harold Patten (Tucson)	Democratic	January 3, 1949 – January 3, 1955	81st 82nd 83rd	Elected in 1948. Re-elected in 1950. Re-elected in 1952. Retired.	1949–1963: All except Maricopa
Stewart Udall (Tucson)	Democratic	January 3, 1955 – January 21, 1961	84th 85th 86th 87th	Elected in 1954. Re-elected in 1956. Re-elected in 1958. Re-elected in 1960. Resigned to become U.S. Secretary of the Interior.	1949–1963: All except Maricopa
Vacant		January 21, 1961 – May 2, 1961	87th		1949–1963: All except Maricopa
Mo Udall (Tucson)	Democratic	May 2, 1961 – May 4, 1991	87th 88th 89th 90th 91st 92nd 93rd 94th 95th 96th 97th 98th 99th 100th 101st 102nd	Elected to finish his brother's term. Re-elected in 1962. Re-elected in 1964. Re-elected in 1966. Re-elected in 1968. Re-elected in 1970. Re-elected in 1972. Re-elected in 1974. Re-elected in 1976. Re-elected in 1978. Re-elected in 1980. Re-elected in 1982. Re-elected in 1984. Re-elected in 1986. Re-elected in 1988. Re-elected in 1990. Resigned for health reasons.	1949–1963: All except Maricopa
Mo Udall (Tucson)	Democratic	May 2, 1961 – May 4, 1991	87th 88th 89th 90th 91st 92nd 93rd 94th 95th 96th 97th 98th 99th 100th 101st 102nd	Elected to finish his brother's term. Re-elected in 1962. Re-elected in 1964. Re-elected in 1966. Re-elected in 1968. Re-elected in 1970. Re-elected in 1972. Re-elected in 1974. Re-elected in 1976. Re-elected in 1978. Re-elected in 1980. Re-elected in 1982. Re-elected in 1984. Re-elected in 1986. Re-elected in 1988. Re-elected in 1990. Resigned for health reasons.	1963–1973: South Arizona, including Tucson: Cochise, Pima, Pinal, Santa Cruz, Yuma
Mo Udall (Tucson)	Democratic	May 2, 1961 – May 4, 1991	87th 88th 89th 90th 91st 92nd 93rd 94th 95th 96th 97th 98th 99th 100th 101st 102nd	Elected to finish his brother's term. Re-elected in 1962. Re-elected in 1964. Re-elected in 1966. Re-elected in 1968. Re-elected in 1970. Re-elected in 1972. Re-elected in 1974. Re-elected in 1976. Re-elected in 1978. Re-elected in 1980. Re-elected in 1982. Re-elected in 1984. Re-elected in 1986. Re-elected in 1988. Re-elected in 1990. Resigned for health reasons.	1973–1983: Cochise, Pima, Santa Cruz, Maricopa (part), Pinal (part)
Mo Udall (Tucson)	Democratic	May 2, 1961 – May 4, 1991	87th 88th 89th 90th 91st 92nd 93rd 94th 95th 96th 97th 98th 99th 100th 101st 102nd	Elected to finish his brother's term. Re-elected in 1962. Re-elected in 1964. Re-elected in 1966. Re-elected in 1968. Re-elected in 1970. Re-elected in 1972. Re-elected in 1974. Re-elected in 1976. Re-elected in 1978. Re-elected in 1980. Re-elected in 1982. Re-elected in 1984. Re-elected in 1986. Re-elected in 1988. Re-elected in 1990. Resigned for health reasons.	1983–1993: Southwest Arizona, including parts of Metro Phoenix and of Tucson: Maricopa (part), Pima (part), Pinal (part), Santa Cruz (part), Yuma (part)
Vacant		May 4, 1991 – October 3, 1991	102nd		1983–1993: Southwest Arizona, including parts of Metro Phoenix and of Tucson: Maricopa (part), Pima (part), Pinal (part), Santa Cruz (part), Yuma (part)
Ed Pastor (Phoenix)	Democratic	October 3, 1991 – January 3, 2003	102nd 103rd 104th 105th 106th 107th	Elected to finish Udall's term. Re-elected in 1992. Re-elected in 1994. Re-elected in 1996. Re-elected in 1998. Re-elected in 2000. Redistricted to the 4th district.	1983–1993: Southwest Arizona, including parts of Metro Phoenix and of Tucson: Maricopa (part), Pima (part), Pinal (part), Santa Cruz (part), Yuma (part)
Ed Pastor (Phoenix)	Democratic	October 3, 1991 – January 3, 2003	102nd 103rd 104th 105th 106th 107th	Elected to finish Udall's term. Re-elected in 1992. Re-elected in 1994. Re-elected in 1996. Re-elected in 1998. Re-elected in 2000. Redistricted to the 4th district.	1993–2003: Southwest Arizona, including parts of Metro Phoenix and of Tucson: Yuma, Maricopa (part), Pima (part), Pinal (part)
Trent Franks (Glendale)	Republican	January 3, 2003 – January 3, 2013	108th 109th 110th 111th 112th	Elected in 2002. Re-elected in 2004. Re-elected in 2006. Re-elected in 2008. Re-elected in 2010. Redistricted to the 8th district.	2003–2013: Parts of Metro Phoenix, extending to NW Arizona, plus the Hopi Reservation: Mohave, Coconino (part), La Paz (part), Maricopa (part), Navajo (part)
Ron Barber (Tucson)	Democratic	January 3, 2013 – January 3, 2015	113th	Redistricted from the 8th district and re-elected in 2012. Lost re-election.	2013–2023: Southeastern Arizona: Cochise, Pima (part)
Martha McSally (Tucson)	Republican	January 3, 2015 – January 3, 2019	114th 115th	Elected in 2014. Re-elected in 2016. Retired to run for U.S. Senator.	2013–2023: Southeastern Arizona: Cochise, Pima (part)
Ann Kirkpatrick (Tucson)	Democratic	January 3, 2019 – January 3, 2023	116th 117th	Elected in 2018. Re-elected in 2020. Redistricted to the 6th district and retired.	2013–2023: Southeastern Arizona: Cochise, Pima (part)
Eli Crane (Oro Valley)	Republican	January 3, 2023 – present	118th 119th	Elected in 2022. Re-elected in 2024.	2023–present: Northeastern Arizona: Apache, Coconino, Gila, Graham(part), Maricopa(part), Mohave(part), Navajo, Pinal (part), Yavapai

== Recent election results ==
Graph of election results in Arizona's 2nd congressional district and its predecessors (Since 2002) View source data.

=== 2002 ===
Arizona's 2nd Congressional District House Election, 2002
Party	Candidate	Votes	%
Republican	Trent Franks	100,359	59.9
Democratic	Randy Camacho	61,217	36.5
Libertarian	Edward Carlson	5,919	3.5
Write-In	William Crum	7	0.0
Majority		39,142	23.4
Total votes		167,502	100.0
Republican win (new boundaries)			

=== 2004 ===
2004 Arizona's 2nd Congressional District House Election
Party	Candidate	Votes	%	±%
Republican	Trent Franks (incumbent)	165,260	59.2	–0.7
Democratic	Randy Camacho	107,406	38.5	+1.9
Libertarian	Powell Gammill	6,625	2.4	–1.2
Write-In	William Crum	12	0.0	±0.0
Majority		57,854	20.7	–2.7
Total votes		279,303	100.0	
Republican hold		Swing	–1.3	

=== 2006 ===
2006 Arizona's 2nd Congressional District House Election
Party	Candidate	Votes	%	±%
Republican	Trent Franks (incumbent)	135,150	58.6	–0.6
Democratic	John Thrasher	89,671	38.9	+0.4
Libertarian	Powell Gammill	5,734	2.5	+0.1
Write-In	William Crum	5	0.0	±0.0
Majority		45,479	19.7	–1.0
Total votes		230,560	100.0	
Republican hold		Swing	–0.5	

=== 2008 ===
2008 Arizona's 2nd Congressional District House Election
Party	Candidate	Votes	%	±%
Republican	Trent Franks (incumbent)	200,914	59.4	+0.8
Democratic	John Thrasher	125,611	37.2	–1.7
Libertarian	Powell Gammill	7,882	2.3	–0.2
Green	William Crum	3,616	1.1	+1.1
Majority		75,303	22.3	+2.6
Total votes		338,023	100.0	
Republican hold		Swing	+1.3	

=== 2010 ===
2010 Arizona's 2nd Congressional District House Election
Party	Candidate	Votes	%	±%
Republican	Trent Franks (incumbent)	173,173	64.9	+5.8
Democratic	John Thrasher	82,891	31.1	–6.1
Libertarian	Powell Gammill	10,820	4.1	+1.7
Write-In	William Crum	8	0.0	–1.1
Write-In	Mark Rankin	2	0.0	N/a
Majority		90,282	33.8	+11.5
Total votes		266,894	100.0	
Republican hold		Swing	+5.8	

=== 2012 ===
2012 Arizona's 2nd Congressional District House Election
Party	Candidate	Votes	%
Democratic	Ron Barber (incumbent)	147,338	50.4
Republican	Martha McSally	144,884	49.6
Libertarian	Anthony Powell (write-in)	57	0.0
Majority		2,454	0.8
Total votes		292,279	100.0
Democratic win (new boundaries)			

=== 2014 ===
2014 Arizona's 2nd Congressional District House Election
Party	Candidate	Votes	%	±%
Republican	Martha McSally	109,704	50.0	+0.4
Democratic	Ron Barber (incumbent)	109,543	49.9	–0.5
Write-in		104	0.0	±0.0
Majority		161	0.1	–0.8
Total votes		219,351	100.0	
Republican gain from Democratic		Swing	+0.5	

=== 2016 ===
2016 Arizona's 2nd Congressional District House Election
Party	Candidate	Votes	%	±%
Republican	Martha McSally (incumbent)	179,806	57.0	+6.9
Democratic	Matt Heinz	135,873	43.0	–6.9
Majority		43,933	13.9	+13.8
Total votes		315,679	100.0	
Republican hold		Swing	+6.9	

=== 2018 ===
2018 Arizona's 2nd Congressional District
Party	Candidate	Votes	%	±%
Democratic	Ann Kirkpatrick	161,000	54.7	+11.7
Republican	Lea Márquez Peterson	133,083	45.2	–11.7
Write-In	Jordan Flayer	50	0.0	N/a
Write-in		19	0.0	N/a
Majority		27,917	9.5	N/a
Total votes		294,152	100.0	
Democratic gain from Republican		Swing	+11.7	

=== 2020 ===
2020 Arizona's 2nd Congressional District
Party	Candidate	Votes	%	±%
Democratic	Ann Kirkpatrick (incumbent)	209,945	55.1	+0.4
Republican	Brandon Martin	170,975	44.9	–0.4
Write-In	Iman Bah	99	0.0	N/a
Common Sense Moderate	Brandon Schlass (write-in)	35	0.0	N/a
Majority		38,970	10.2	+0.7
Total votes		381,054	100.0	
Democratic hold		Swing	+0.4	

=== 2022–present ===
==== 2022 ====
2022 Arizona's 2nd Congressional District
Party	Candidate	Votes	%
Republican	Eli Crane	174,169	53.9
Democratic	Tom O'Halleran (incumbent)	149,151	46.1
Write-In	Chris Sarappo	76	0.0
Majority		25,018	7.7
Total votes		323,396	100.0
Republican win (new boundaries)			

==== 2024 ====
Arizona's 2nd Congressional District House Election, 2024
Party	Candidate	Votes	%	±%
Republican	Eli Crane (incumbent)	221,413	54.5	+0.6
Democratic	Jonathan Nez	184,963	45.5	−0.6
Write-in		55	0.0	–0.0
Majority		36,450	9.0	+1.2
Total votes		406,431	100.0	
Republican hold		Swing	+0.6	

== See also ==
- Arizona's congressional districts
- List of United States congressional districts
