= Pinal County, Arizona =

County in Arizona, United States

- County
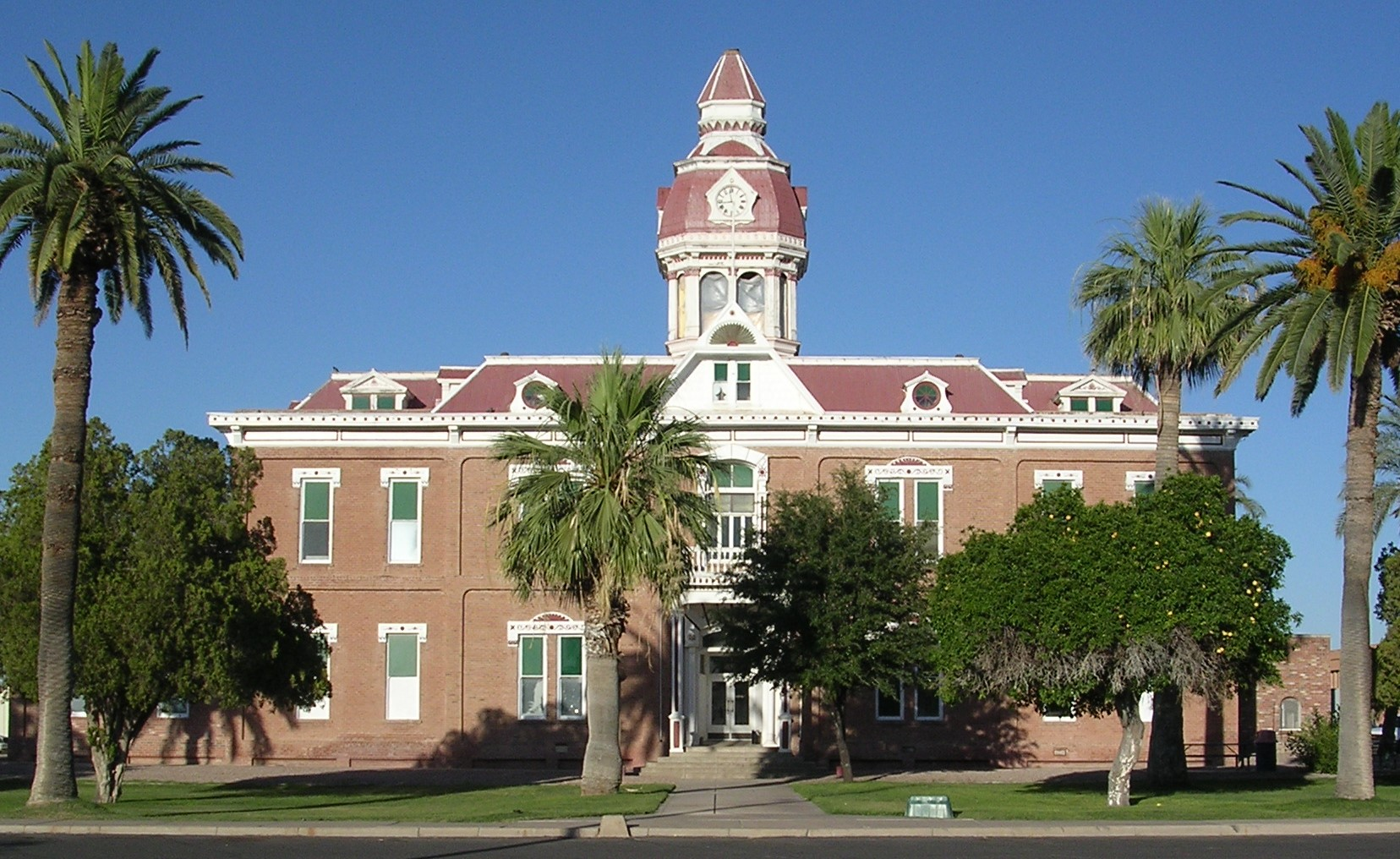
- Second Pinal County Courthouse in Florence

- Seal Logo

- Location within the U.S. state of Arizona
- Coordinates: 32°59′13″N 111°19′38″W
- Country: United States
- State: Arizona
- Founded: February 1, 1875
- Named for: Pinal Peak
- Seat: Florence
- Largest town: San Tan Valley

Area
  - Total: 5,374 sq mi (13,920 km^{2})
  - Land: 5,366 sq mi (13,900 km^{2})
  - Water: 8.6 sq mi (22 km^{2}) 0.2%

Population (2020)
  - Total: 425,264
  - Estimate (2025): 539,380 ▲
  - Density: 79.25/sq mi (30.60/km^{2})
- Time zone: UTC−7 (Mountain)
- Congressional districts: 2nd, 5th, 6th, 7th
- Website: www.pinal.gov

Pinal County (/pɪˈnæl/ pih-NAL) is a county in the central part of the U.S. state of Arizona. According to the 2020 census, the population of the county was 425,264, making it Arizona's third-most populous county. The county seat is Florence. The county was established in 1875.

Pinal County contains parts of the Tohono Oʼodham Nation, the Gila River Indian Community and the San Carlos Apache Indian Reservation, as well as all of the Ak-Chin Indian Community.

Pinal County is included in the Phoenix metropolitan area. Suburban growth southward from greater Phoenix has begun to spread into the county's northern parts; similarly, growth northward from Tucson is spreading into the county's southern portions. Pinal County has five cities: Maricopa, Casa Grande, Apache Junction, Eloy, and Coolidge. There are also many unincorporated areas, which have shown accelerated growth patterns in recent years.

== History ==
Pinal County was carved out of neighboring Maricopa County and Pima County on February 1, 1875, during the Eighth Legislature. In the August 18, 1899, issue of The Arizona Magazine, the name "Pinal" is said to come from the pine-clad Pinal Mountains. Pinal County was the second-fastest-growing county in the U.S. between 2000 and 2010.

In 2010, CNN Money named Pinal County as the second fastest growing county in the USA.

== Geography ==
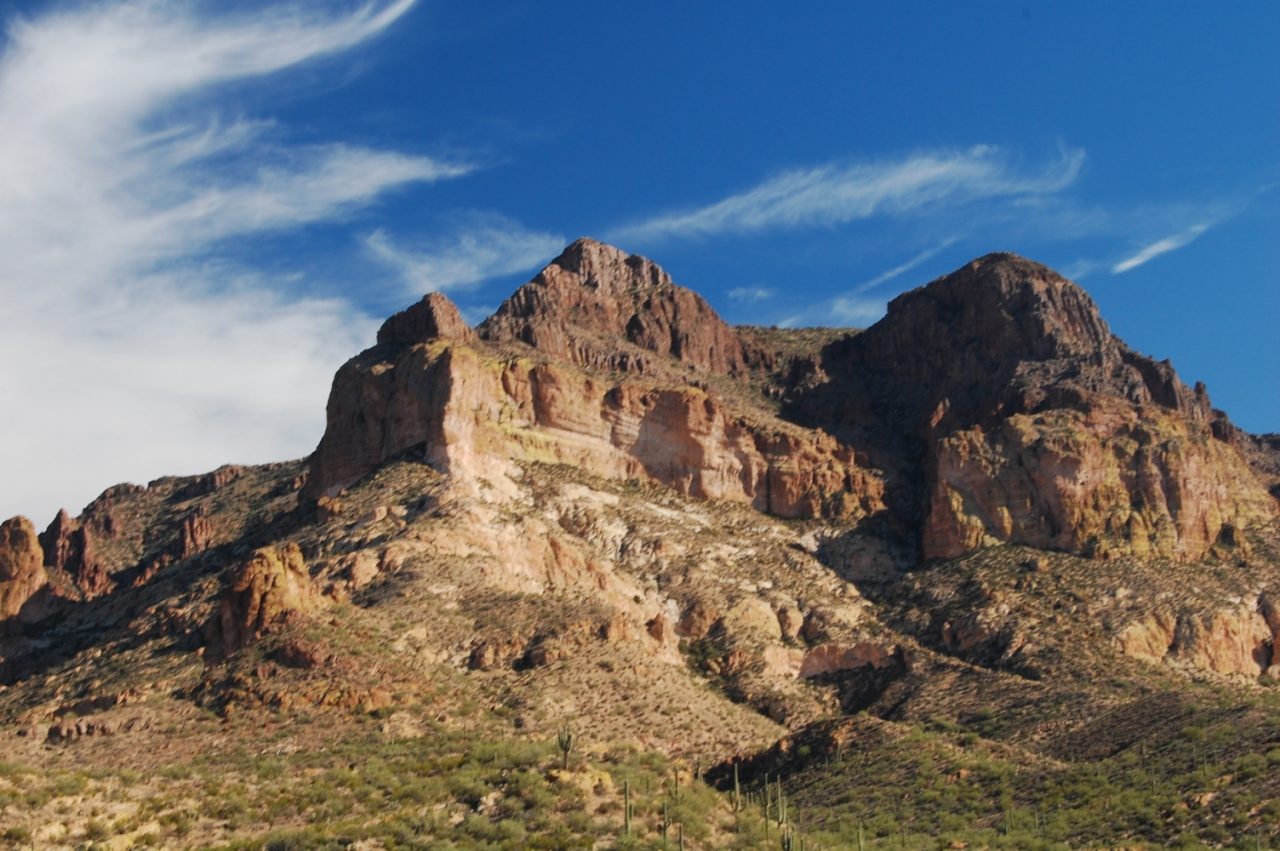
Picketpost Peak, a prominent landmark above Superior

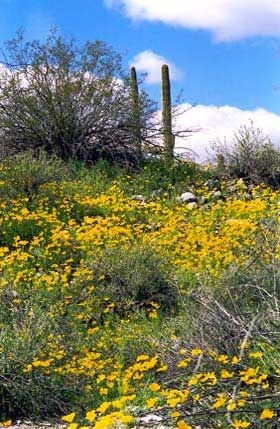
Spring wildflowers in the Sonoran Desert National Monument

According to the United States Census Bureau, the county has a total area of 5,374 square miles (13,920 km^{2}), of which 5,366 square miles (13,900 km^{2}) is land and 8.6 square miles (22 km^{2}) (0.2%) is water.

=== Mountain ranges ===
- Mineral Mountains
- Sacaton Mountains
- Superstition Mountains
- Waterman Mountains

=== Adjacent counties ===
- Maricopa County – west, north
- Gila County – north
- Graham County – east
- Pima County – south

=== Major highways ===
- Interstate 8
- Interstate 10
- U.S. Route 60
- Historic U.S. Route 80
- State Route 24
- State Route 77
- State Route 79
- State Route 84
- State Route 87
- State Route 88
- State Route 177
- State Route 187
- State Route 238
- State Route 287
- State Route 347
- State Route 387
- State Route 587

=== National protected areas ===
- Casa Grande Ruins National Monument
- Coronado National Forest (part)
- Hohokam Pima National Monument
- Ironwood Forest National Monument (part)
- Sonoran Desert National Monument (part)
- Tonto National Forest (part)

== Demographics ==
Historical population
Census	Pop.	Note	%±
1880	3,044		—
1890	4,251		39.7%
1900	7,779		83.0%
1910	9,045		16.3%
1920	16,130		78.3%
1930	22,081		36.9%
1940	28,841		30.6%
1950	43,191		49.8%
1960	62,673		45.1%
1970	67,916		8.4%
1980	90,918		33.9%
1990	116,379		28.0%
2000	179,727		54.4%
2010	375,770		109.1%
2020	425,264		13.2%
2025 (est.)	539,380	▲	26.8%
U.S. Decennial Census; 1790–1960 1900–1990; 1990–2000 2010–2020

=== Racial and ethnic composition ===
Pinal County, Arizona – Racial and ethnic composition Note: the US Census treats Hispanic/Latino as an ethnic category. This table excludes Latinos from the racial categories and assigns them to a separate category. Hispanics/Latinos may be of any race.
Race / Ethnicity (NH = Non-Hispanic)	2020	2010	2000	1990	1980
White alone (NH)	56.4% (240,006)	58.7% (220,486)	58.8% (105,641)	59.2% (68,900)	58.3% (53,008)
Black alone (NH)	4.9% (20,712)	4.3% (16,007)	2.6% (4,658)	3% (3,469)	3.2% (2,924)
American Indian alone (NH)	4% (17,156)	4.6% (17,410)	6.9% (12,419)	8.1% (9,402)	8.7% (7,900)
Asian alone (NH)	1.5% (6,290)	1.6% (6,114)	0.6% (1,001)	0.4% (439)	0.3% (260)
Pacific Islander alone (NH)	0.3% (1,081)	0.4% (1,489)	0.1% (111)		
Other race alone (NH)	0.4% (1,658)	0.1% (487)	0.1% (169)	0.1% (107)	0.2% (149)
Multiracial (NH)	4% (16,828)	1.8% (6,800)	1.1% (2,057)	—	—
Hispanic/Latino (any race)	28.6% (121,533)	28.5% (106,977)	29.9% (53,671)	29.3% (34,062)	29.3% (26,677)

=== American Community Survey 2025 data ===
The United States Census Bureau estimated that in 2025, Pinal County’s population was 539,380. It was also estimated that the county's population was 53.17% Non-Hispanic White, 31.62% Hispanic or Latino, 5.95% Non-Hispanic Black, 1.95% Asian, 3.42% Native American, 0.26% Pacific Islander, and 3.64% Multiracial.

Total	Population	Percentage
Non-Hispanic White	286,795	53.17%
Hispanic or Latino	170,531	31.62%
Non-Hispanic Black	32,074	5.95%
Asian	10,512	1.95%
Native American	18,438	3.42%
Pacific Islander	1,378	0.26%
Non-Hispanic Multiracial	19,652	3.64%

=== Population Growth ===
Pinal County, Arizona ranks fifth among U.S. counties in percent population growth from July 1, 2023, to July 1, 2024.^{[}^{20]} The county’s estimated population increased from 486,395 in 2023 to 513,862 in 2024, representing a 5.6% growth rate, far above the national average.^{[}^{20]} To understand what is driving this rapid expansion, it is necessary to decompose overall population change into its two main components: natural increase (births minus deaths) and net migration (domestic plus international).

==== Natural Increase (births and deaths) ====
A key consideration in evaluating natural increase is the county’s mortality pattern over time. In 2019, Pinal County recorded a crude death rate of 732.4 deaths per 100,000 residents, representing a typical pre-pandemic baseline.^{[}^{19]} Mortality then rose sharply during 2020 and 2021, reaching 1,124.0 deaths per 100,000 residents at the height of the COVID-19 pandemic.^{[}^{19]} By 2022, mortality had begun to decline, though it remained elevated relative to 2019 levels.^{[}^{19]} It is expected that as more data becomes available, the downward trend in mortality will continue and gradually return to levels similar to those observed before the pandemic.

Birth patterns show a more gradual change. Pinal County’s birth rate increased from 9.9 per 1,000 population in 2019 to 11.3 per 1,000 population in 2022.^{[}^{19]} Although this represents modest growth, the overall number of births only slightly outpaced the number of deaths during this period. Data from the U.S. Census Bureau’s population estimates confirm this: between April 1, 2020, and July 1, 2024, natural change contributed only 2,011 people to the county’s population growth.^{[}^{21]} This demonstrates that natural increase played a relatively minor role, as 2,011 people make up only a small fraction of the county’s total population increase of 87,855 during this period.^{[}^{21]}

==== Migration ====
In contrast, migration overwhelmingly drove Pinal County’s expansion. Between April 1, 2020, and July 1, 2024, the county experienced a net migration inflow of 86,082 people.^{[}^{21]} Domestic migration accounted for the vast majority of this increase, with 78,400 domestic in-migrants compared to 7,682 international migrants.^{[}^{21]} Net international migration includes the movement of both U.S.-born and foreign-born persons, movement between the United States and Puerto Rico, and the movement of Armed Forces personnel, however, it still represents only a small portion of total in-migration.^{[}^{21]} The data make clear that domestic migration, not natural increase and not international immigration, is the dominant force behind Pinal County’s rapid growth.

==== Age Structure ====
The county’s age structure provides further insight into these patterns and reinforces the interpretation that migration is the primary driver of population change. According to ACS estimates, 57.2% of Pinal County’s population in 2023 fell within the working-age range of 18–64, an increase from 56.9% in 2020.^{[22]} Although the percentage change is small, the stability and slight rise of the working-age share is notable, especially in a high-growth area. Fast-growing counties often attract working-age adults and families who relocate from larger metropolitan regions, particularly those with higher housing costs or greater congestion. Pinal County’s age distribution aligns with this typical domestic in-migrant profile.

In addition, the data suggest that the county’s recent growth is not primarily driven by retirees or older adults, who would be reflected in a rising population of residents aged 65 and older. Instead, the presence of a slightly increasing working-age majority indicates that population change is shaped not only by the volume of net migration, but also by the demographic characteristics of those migrants. New arrivals to the county appear to be disproportionately young adults, middle-aged workers, and families.

This working-age dominance has several important implications for Pinal County’s development. A growing labor force can support employment expansion and economic productivity. The influx of families may increase demand for school enrollment, childcare services, and related infrastructure. Higher levels of domestic in-migration can also stimulate the housing market, contributing to rising demand and new residential construction. Over the long term, the county’s age structure will also shape future natural increase through population momentum, as a stable or growing share of adults in their childbearing years may help sustain birth levels even as mortality trends return to pre-pandemic patterns.

=== 2020 census ===
As of the 2020 census, the county had a population of 425,264. Of the residents, 23.4% were under the age of 18 and 21.6% were 65 years of age or older; the median age was 40.4 years. For every 100 females there were 105.2 males, and for every 100 females age 18 and over there were 105.6 males. 77.0% of residents lived in urban areas and 23.0% lived in rural areas.

The racial makeup of the county was 63.3% White, 5.2% Black or African American, 5.0% American Indian and Alaska Native, 1.6% Asian, 0.3% Native Hawaiian and Pacific Islander, 11.8% from some other race, and 12.9% from two or more races. Hispanic or Latino residents of any race comprised 28.6% of the population.

There were 146,663 households in the county, of which 31.6% had children under the age of 18 living with them and 22.4% had a female householder with no spouse or partner present. About 21.2% of all households were made up of individuals and 11.5% had someone living alone who was 65 years of age or older.

There were 172,878 housing units, of which 15.2% were vacant. Among occupied housing units, 79.6% were owner-occupied and 20.4% were renter-occupied. The homeowner vacancy rate was 2.2% and the rental vacancy rate was 8.7%.

=== 2010 census ===
As of the census of 2010, there were 375,770 people, 125,590 households, and 92,157 families living in the county. The population density was 70.0 inhabitants per square mile (27.0 inhabitants/km^{2}). There were 159,222 housing units at an average density of 29.7 units per square mile (11.5 units/km^{2}). The racial makeup of the county was 72.4% white, 5.6% American Indian, 4.6% black or African American, 1.7% Asian, 0.4% Pacific islander, 11.5% from other races, and 3.8% from two or more races. Those of Hispanic or Latino origin made up 28.5% of the population. In terms of ancestry, 16.9% were German, 10.6% were Irish, 9.5% were English, and 2.8% were American.

Of the 125,590 households, 37.0% had children under the age of 18 living with them, 55.8% were married couples living together, 11.7% had a female householder with no husband present, 26.6% were non-families, and 20.5% of households were made up of individuals. The average household size was 2.78 and the average family size was 3.21. The median age was 35.3 years.

The median household income was $51,310 and the median family income was $56,299. Males had a median income of $45,082 versus $34,785 for females. The per capita income for the county was $21,716. About 10.1% of families and 13.5% of the population were below the poverty line, including 18.3% of those under age 18 and 7.6% of those age 65 or over.

=== 2000 census ===
As of the census of 2000, there were 179,727 people, 61,364 households, and 45,225 families living in the county. The population density was 34 inhabitants per square mile (13 inhabitants/km^{2}). There were 81,154 housing units at an average density of 15 units per square mile (5.8 units/km^{2}). The racial makeup of the county was 70.4% White, 2.8% Black or African American, 7.8% Native American, 0.6% Asian, 0.1% Pacific Islander, 15.7% from other races, and 2.7% from two or more races. 29.9% of the population were Hispanic or Latino of any race. 21.9% reported speaking Spanish at home, while 1.4% speak O'odham and <0.1% speak Apache.

Of the 61,364 households 29.8% had children under the age of 18 living with them, 56.9% were married couples living together, 11.5% had a female householder with no husband present, and 26.3% were non-families. 21.1% of households were one person and 9.2% were one person aged 65 or older. The average household size was 2.68 and the average family size was 3.09.

The age distribution was 25.1% under the age of 18, 8.7% from 18 to 24, 27.3% from 25 to 44, 22.7% from 45 to 64, and 16.2% 65 or older. The median age was 37 years. For every 100 females, there were 114.2 males. For every 100 females age 18 and over, there were 117.0 males.

The median household income was $35,856 and the median family income was $39,548. Males had a median income of $31,544 versus $23,726 for females. The per capita income for the county was $16,025. About 12.1% of families and 16.9% of the population were below the poverty threshold, including 25.5% of those under age 18 and 8.7% of those age 65 or over.

== Politics ==
During the 20th century, Pinal was very much a bellwether county in U.S. presidential elections, having supported the winning candidate in every election between Arizona's statehood in 1912 and 2004 except for that of 1968, when Hubert Humphrey won the county by 3.2 percentage points but lost to Richard Nixon. As a result of the urban sprawl from Phoenix spreading into the county, a major political reversal has taken place between it and neighboring Maricopa County since the turn of the millennium. Maricopa County is becoming more progressive while Pinal has trended conservative. In 2024, Donald Trump carried the county by the largest margin since Nixon in 1972, and with the highest vote share for a Republican since statehood.

United States presidential election results for Pinal County, Arizona
Year	Republican		Democratic		Third party(ies)	
Year	No.	%	No.	%	No.	%
1912	80	9.94%	352	43.73%	373	46.34%
1916	855	39.24%	1,232	56.54%	92	4.22%
1920	1,493	54.15%	1,264	45.85%	0	0.00%
1924	1,075	40.86%	988	37.55%	568	21.59%
1928	1,631	53.41%	1,419	46.46%	4	0.13%
1932	1,000	23.90%	3,137	74.98%	47	1.12%
1936	1,216	24.98%	3,498	71.86%	154	3.16%
1940	1,996	31.05%	4,411	68.61%	22	0.34%
1944	1,909	38.51%	3,026	61.04%	22	0.44%
1948	2,232	37.91%	3,572	60.68%	83	1.41%
1952	4,985	52.44%	4,522	47.56%	0	0.00%
1956	5,762	53.15%	5,063	46.70%	17	0.16%
1960	6,441	47.07%	7,232	52.85%	11	0.08%
1964	6,956	41.23%	9,911	58.74%	5	0.03%
1968	6,883	42.37%	7,409	45.61%	1,954	12.03%
1972	10,584	60.28%	6,404	36.47%	571	3.25%
1976	9,354	45.40%	10,595	51.42%	655	3.18%
1980	12,195	52.43%	9,207	39.59%	1,856	7.98%
1984	16,464	57.53%	11,923	41.66%	232	0.81%
1988	14,966	51.29%	13,850	47.46%	364	1.25%
1992	11,669	31.76%	15,468	42.10%	9,602	26.14%
1996	13,034	35.33%	19,579	53.07%	4,282	11.61%
2000	20,122	48.73%	19,650	47.59%	1,518	3.68%
2004	37,006	57.27%	27,252	42.17%	364	0.56%
2008	59,421	56.38%	44,254	41.99%	1,723	1.63%
2012	62,079	57.12%	44,306	40.77%	2,297	2.11%
2016	72,819	56.21%	47,892	36.97%	8,835	6.82%
2020	107,077	57.87%	75,106	40.59%	2,854	1.54%
2024	126,926	60.57%	80,656	38.49%	1,984	0.95%

== Government ==
Salaries for county elected officials are set by the Arizona Revised Statutes. All county elected officials except the Sheriff (Ross Teeple as of 2025) and the County Attorney make a salary of $83,800, along with county benefits and compulsory participation in the Arizona State Elected Official Retirement Plan. In 2020, the Republican Party won complete control of the Board of Supervisors. In 2022, the Arizona Supreme Court deemed their Road Improvement Tax (passed in 2018) as illegal due to the tax only applied to purchases under $10,000. In 2022, the county's elections department came under intense scrutiny following several mistakes in the primary election. At the time, the Elections Department had only two full-time employees. The Board of Supervisors found themselves being accused of not properly funding the Elections Department.

== Economy ==
CoreCivic, while still known as Corrections Corporation of America, operated the privately owned Saguaro Correctional Center. located in Eloy in Pinal County, It is paid by the state of Hawaii to house the majority of Hawaii's male prison inmate population.

== Communities ==
Map of incorporated areas and Indian reservations in Pinal County

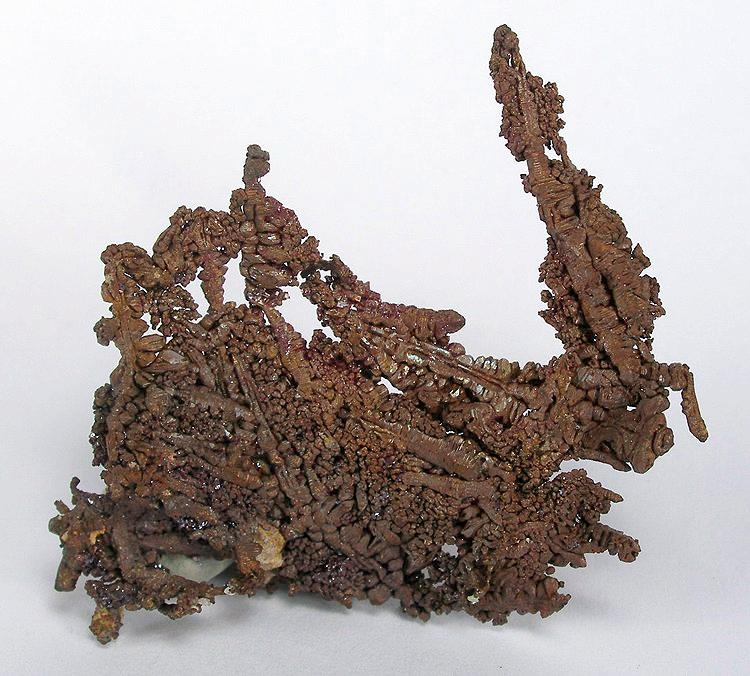
Native copper with cuprite from the Ray Mine near Kearny

=== Cities ===
- Apache Junction (partially in Maricopa County)
- Casa Grande
- Coolidge
- Eloy
- Maricopa

=== Towns ===
- Florence (county seat)
- Hayden (partially in Gila County)
- Kearny
- Mammoth
- Marana (mostly in Pima County)
- Queen Creek (mostly in Maricopa County)
- San Tan Valley
- Superior
- Winkelman (partially in Gila County)

=== Census-designated places ===
- Ak-Chin Village
- Arizona City
- Blackwater
- Cactus Forest
- Campo Bonito
- Casa Blanca
- Chuichu
- Dudleyville
- Gold Canyon
- Goodyear Village
- Kohatk
- Lower Santan Village
- Oracle
- Picacho
- Queen Valley
- Red Rock
- Sacate Village
- Sacaton
- Sacaton Flats Village
- Saddlebrooke
- San Manuel
- Santa Cruz
- Stanfield
- Stotonic Village
- Sweet Water Village
- Tat Momoli
- Top-of-the-World (partially in Gila County)
- Upper Santan Village
- Vaiva Vo
- Wet Camp Village

=== Other unincorporated communities ===
- Arizola
- Bapchule
- Barkerville
- Burns
- Kelvin
- Oracle Junction
- Randolph
- Ray Junction
- Reymert
- Riverside
- Santan

=== Ghost towns ===
- Adamsville
- Alma
- American Flag
- Cochran
- Copper Creek
- Goldfield
- Pinal City
- Ray
- Reymert
- Socaton Village
- Sonora
- Tiger

=== County population ranking ===
The population ranking of the following table is based on the 2020 census of Pinal County. † county seat

Rank	City/Town/etc.	Population (2020 Census)	Municipal type	Incorporated
1	San Tan Valley	99,894	Town	2025
2	Queen Creek (Mostly in Maricopa County)	59,519	Town	1990
3	Maricopa	58,125	City	2003
4	Casa Grande	53,658	City	1879 (founded)
5	Marana (mostly in Pima County)	51,908	Town	1977
6	Apache Junction (partially in Maricopa County)	38,499	City	1978
7	† Florence	26,785	Town	1900
8	Eloy	15,635	City	1949
9	Coolidge	13,218	City	1945
10	Saddlebrooke	12,574	CDP	
11	Gold Canyon	11,404	CDP	
12	Arizona City	9,868	CDP	
13	San Manuel	3,692	CDP	
14	Oracle	3,656	CDP	
15	Superior	3,319	Town	1976
16	Kearny	2,261	Town	1959
17	Sacaton	1,824	CDP	
18	Mammoth	1,759	Town	1958
19	Dudleyville	1,068	CDP	
20	Casa Blanca	1,004	CDP	
21	Queen Valley	566	CDP	
22	Stanfield	515	CDP	

== See also ==
- National Register of Historic Places listings in Pinal County, Arizona
