= Vaiva Vo, Arizona =

CDP in Pinal County, Arizona

- CDP
- Location of Vaiva Vo in Pinal County, Arizona.

- Location in the United States Vaiva Vo, Arizona (the United States)
- Coordinates: 32°42′0″N 111°55′37″W
- Country: United States
- State: Arizona
- County: Pinal

Area
  - Total: 0.46 sq mi (1.19 km^{2})
  - Land: 0.46 sq mi (1.19 km^{2})
  - Water: 0 sq mi (0.00 km^{2})

Population (2020)
  - Total: 93
  - Density: 201.9/sq mi (77.94/km^{2})
- Time zone: UTC-7 (MST (no DST))
- ZIP code: 85193
- Area code: 520
- FIPS code: 04-78680

Vaiva Vo (O'odham) name translates as "Cocklebur Pond", is a census-designated place in Pinal County, in the U.S. state of Arizona. Its population was 93 as of the 2020 census. It is located on the northwestern part of the Tohono O'odham Nation reservation.

== Population ==
At the 2020 census there were 147 people, 30 households, and 24 families living in the CDP. The population density was 319 people per square mile. There were 34 housing units.

The median household income was $28,523. The per capita income for the CDP was $8,275.

== Demographics ==
Historical population
Census	Pop.	Note	%±
2020	93		—
U.S. Decennial Census

The population was 128 at the 2010 census. As of 2019, the population has risen to 142.

== Primary coordinates ==
The primary coordinate point for Vaiva Vo is located at latitude 32.7178 and longitude -111.9265 in Pinal County.

== Climate ==
Vaivo Vo has a nice summertime climate and is best visited during the months of February to November. This is when the weather is most pleasant with hot temperatures and limited rainfall. The highest average temperature in Vaiva Vo is 39 °C in June and the lowest is 17 °C in December.

== Education ==
It is within the Stanfield Elementary School District and the Casa Grande Union High School District.
