= Tat Momoli, Arizona =

CDP in Pinal County, Arizona

- CDP
- Location of Tat Momoli in Pinal County, Arizona.

- Location in the United States
- Country: United States
- State: Arizona
- County: Pinal

Area
  - Total: 0.93 sq mi (2.41 km^{2})
  - Land: 0.93 sq mi (2.41 km^{2})
  - Water: 0 sq mi (0.00 km^{2})

Population (2020)
  - Total: 18
  - Density: 19.4/sq mi (7.48/km^{2})
- Time zone: UTC-7 (MST (no DST))
- FIPS code: 04-72280

Tat Momoli (O'odham: Taḍ Memelkuḍ) is a census-designated place located in Pinal County, Arizona, United States, on the Tohono Oʼodham Indian Reservation. As of the Census of 2010 it had a population of 10 with a population density of 4.16 people per km^{2}.

== Geography ==
Tat Momoli is located at 32°36′4″N 111°53′10″W. According to the United States Census Bureau, Tat Momoli has a total area of 2.41 km^{2}, all land.

== Demographics ==
Historical population
Census	Pop.	Note	%±
2010	10		—
2020	18		80.0%
U.S. Decennial Census

According to the Census of 2010, there were 10 people living in Tat Momoli. The population density was 4.16 people/km^{2}. Of the 10 residents, Tat Momoli was composed of 10% whites, 60% American Indians or Alaska Natives, and 30% were some other race. Out of the total population 30% were Hispanic or Latino of any race.

== Education ==
It is within the Stanfield Elementary School District and the Casa Grande Union High School District.
