= Campo Bonito, Arizona =

CDP in Pinal County, Arizona

- CDP
- Location of Campo Bonito in Pinal County, Arizona.

- Location in the United States
- Coordinates: 32°33′46″N 110°41′54″W
- Country: United States
- State: Arizona
- County: Pinal

Area
  - Total: 4.02 sq mi (10.40 km^{2})
  - Land: 4.02 sq mi (10.40 km^{2})
  - Water: 0 sq mi (0.00 km^{2})

Population (2020)
  - Total: 83
  - Density: 20.7/sq mi (7.98/km^{2})
- Time zone: UTC-7 (MST (no DST))
- FIPS code: 04-09580

Campo Bonito is a census-designated place (CDP) in Pinal County, Arizona, United States. The population was 74 at the 2010 census.

== Demographics ==
Historical population
Census	Pop.	Note	%±
2010	74		—
2020	83		12.2%
U.S. Decennial Census

As of the census of 2010, there were 74 people living in the CDP. The population density was 217.4 people per square mile. The racial makeup of the CDP was 91% White, 5% from other races, and 4% from two or more races. 19% of the population were Hispanic or Latino of any race.
