= Saddlebrooke, Arizona =

Place in Arizona, United States

- Town
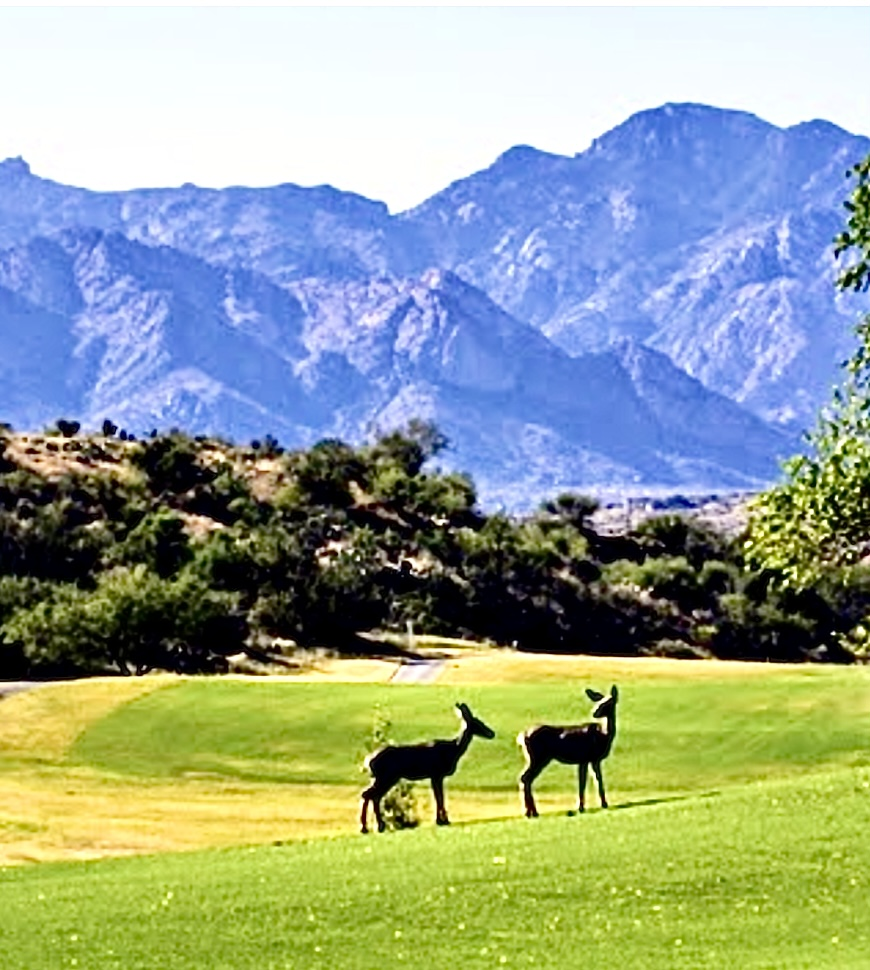

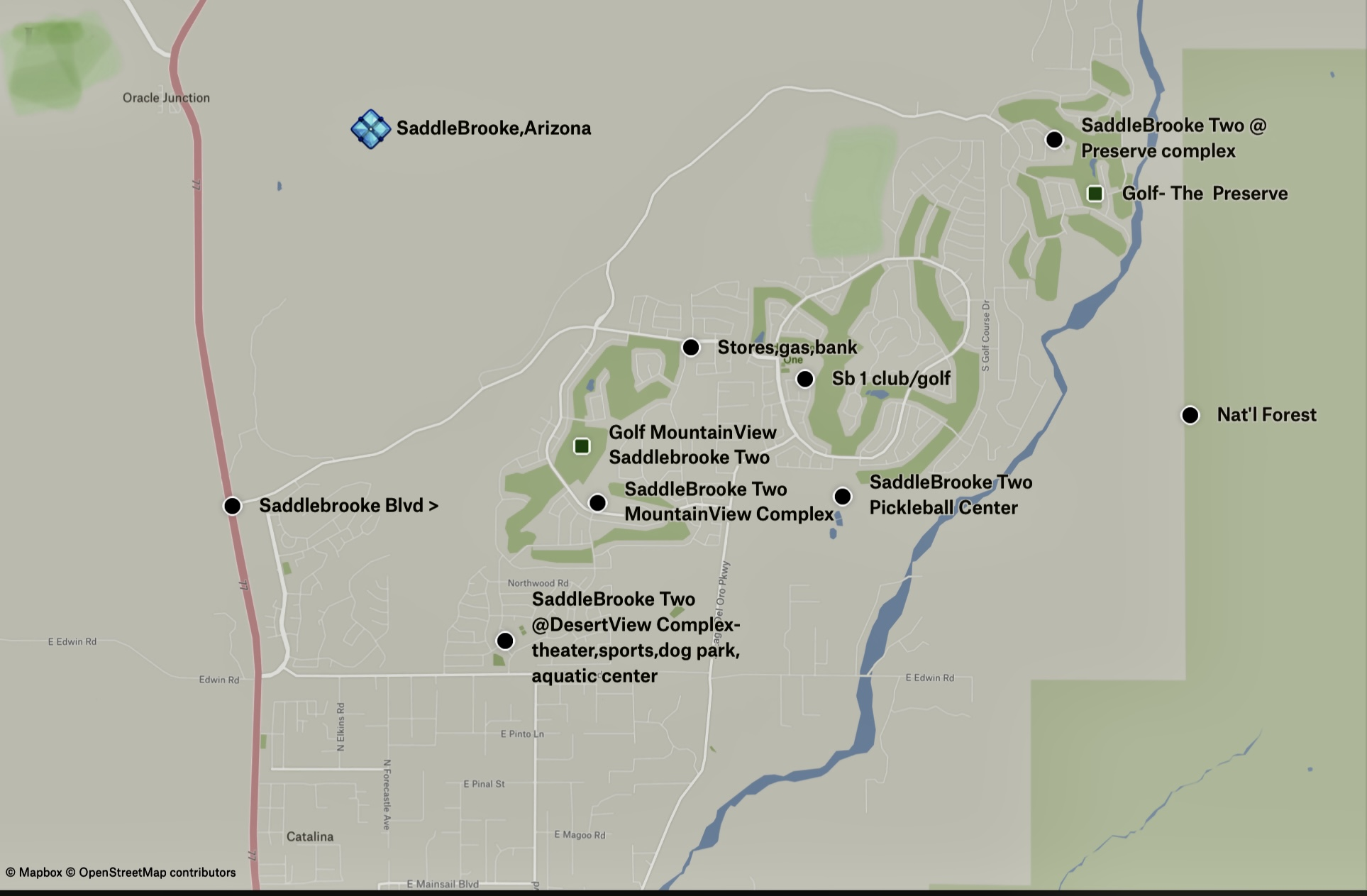
- Location of Saddlebrooke in Pinal County, Arizona.

- Location in the United States
- Coordinates: 32°32′25″N 110°51′21″W
- Country: United States
- State: Arizona
- County: Pinal

Area
  - Total: 47.81 sq mi (123.82 km^{2})
  - Land: 47.80 sq mi (123.81 km^{2})
  - Water: 0 sq mi (0.00 km^{2})

Population (2020)
  - Total: 12,574
  - Density: 263.0/sq mi (101.55/km^{2})
- Time zone: UTC-7 (MST (no DST))
- FIPS code: 04-61940

Saddlebrooke is a census-designated place (CDP) and retirement community in Pinal County, Arizona, United States. The population was 12,574 at the United States 2020 Census

There are two communities managed by homeowner associations within the retirement development; SaddleBrooke One, and SaddleBrooke Two, the latter includes the Preserve subdivision. Eagle Crest is a smaller all age subdivision that is part of the SaddleBrooke (CDP).

SaddleBrooke, Arizona is located just north of Oro Valley, AZ. and close to Tucson AZ . The 3400 ft elevation in the foothills results in cooler year round temperatures compared to many other Arizona locations. In the foothills of the Catalina Mountains. It has rolling and changing in topography and elevation changes

== Demographics ==
Historical population
Census	Pop.	Note	%±
2020	12,574		—
U.S. Decennial Census

=== 2020 census ===
As of the 2020 census, Saddlebrooke had a population of 12,574. The median age was 71.9 years. 4.1% of residents were under the age of 18 and 73.0% of residents were 65 years of age or older. For every 100 females there were 90.9 males, and for every 100 females age 18 and over there were 90.1 males age 18 and over.

80.9% of residents lived in urban areas, while 19.1% lived in rural areas.

There were 6,552 households in Saddlebrooke, of which 4.7% had children under the age of 18 living in them. Of all households, 71.6% were married-couple households, 8.1% were households with a male householder and no spouse or partner present, and 16.8% were households with a female householder and no spouse or partner present. About 21.2% of all households were made up of individuals and 18.7% had someone living alone who was 65 years of age or older.

There were 7,340 housing units, of which 10.7% were vacant. The homeowner vacancy rate was 1.5% and the rental vacancy rate was 26.3%.

Racial composition as of the 2020 census
Race	Number	Percent
White	11,434	90.9%
Black or African American	87	0.7%
American Indian and Alaska Native	45	0.4%
Asian	144	1.1%
Native Hawaiian and Other Pacific Islander	8	0.1%
Some other race	180	1.4%
Two or more races	676	5.4%
Hispanic or Latino (of any race)	814	6.5%

=== 2010 census ===
In 2010 the racial and ethnic makeup of Saddlebrooke's population was 92.8% non-Hispanic white, 0.8% black or African American, 0.2% Native American, 0.9% Asian, 0.9% two or more races and 4.9% Hispanic or Latino.

== Gallery ==
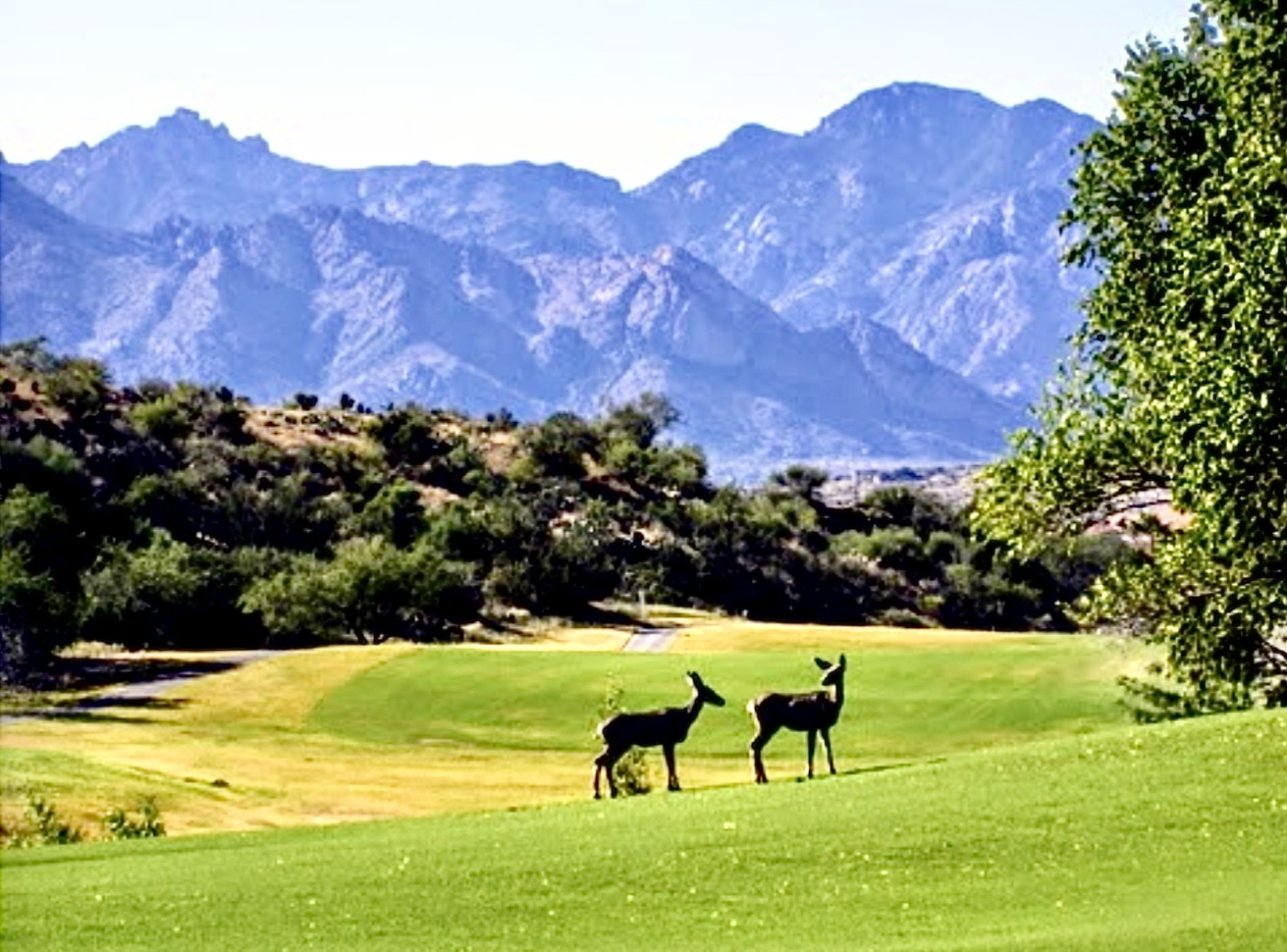
The Preserve subdivision at SaddleBrooke, Arizona

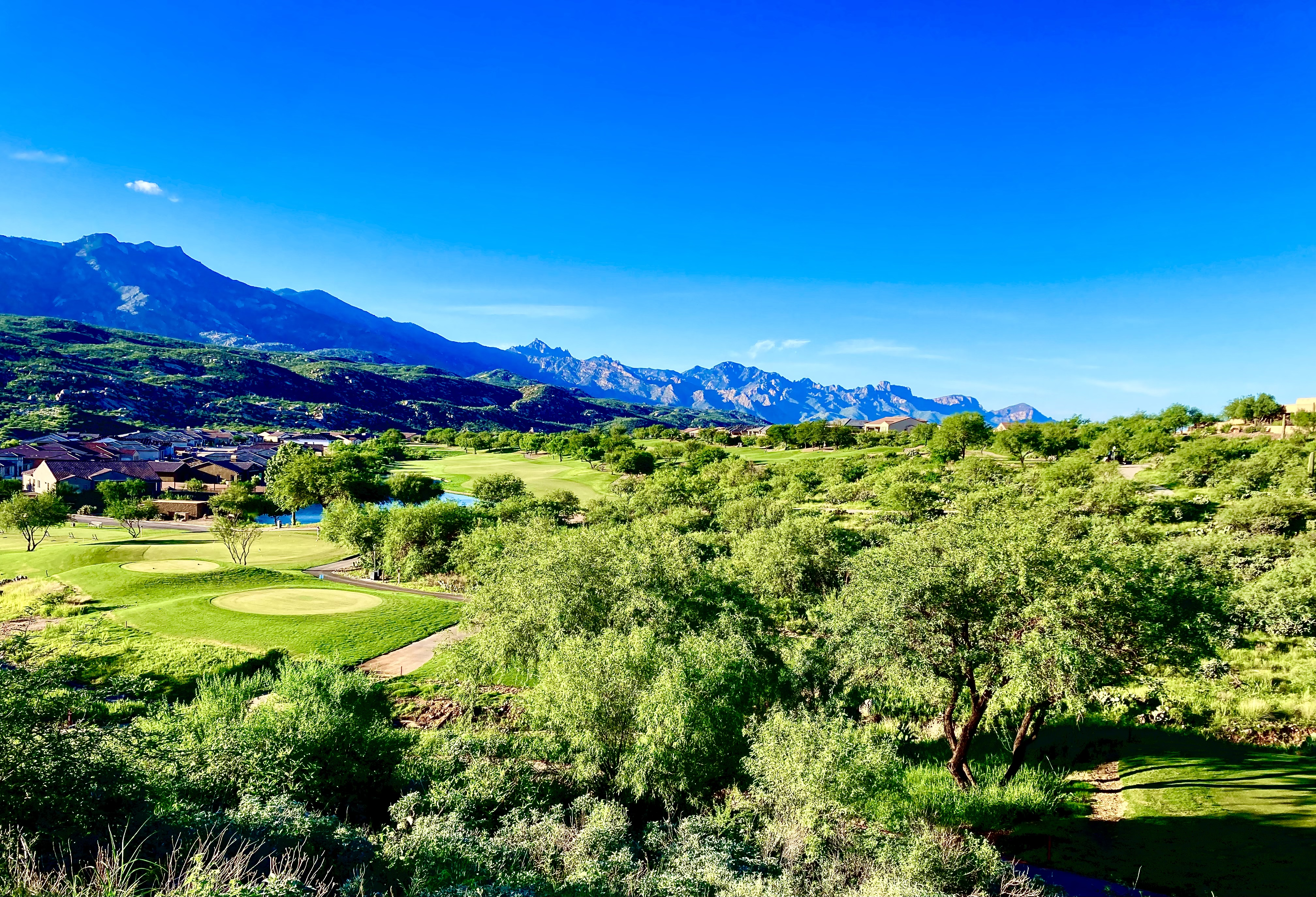
SaddleBrooke Arizona. The Preserve section at SaddleBrooke Two community

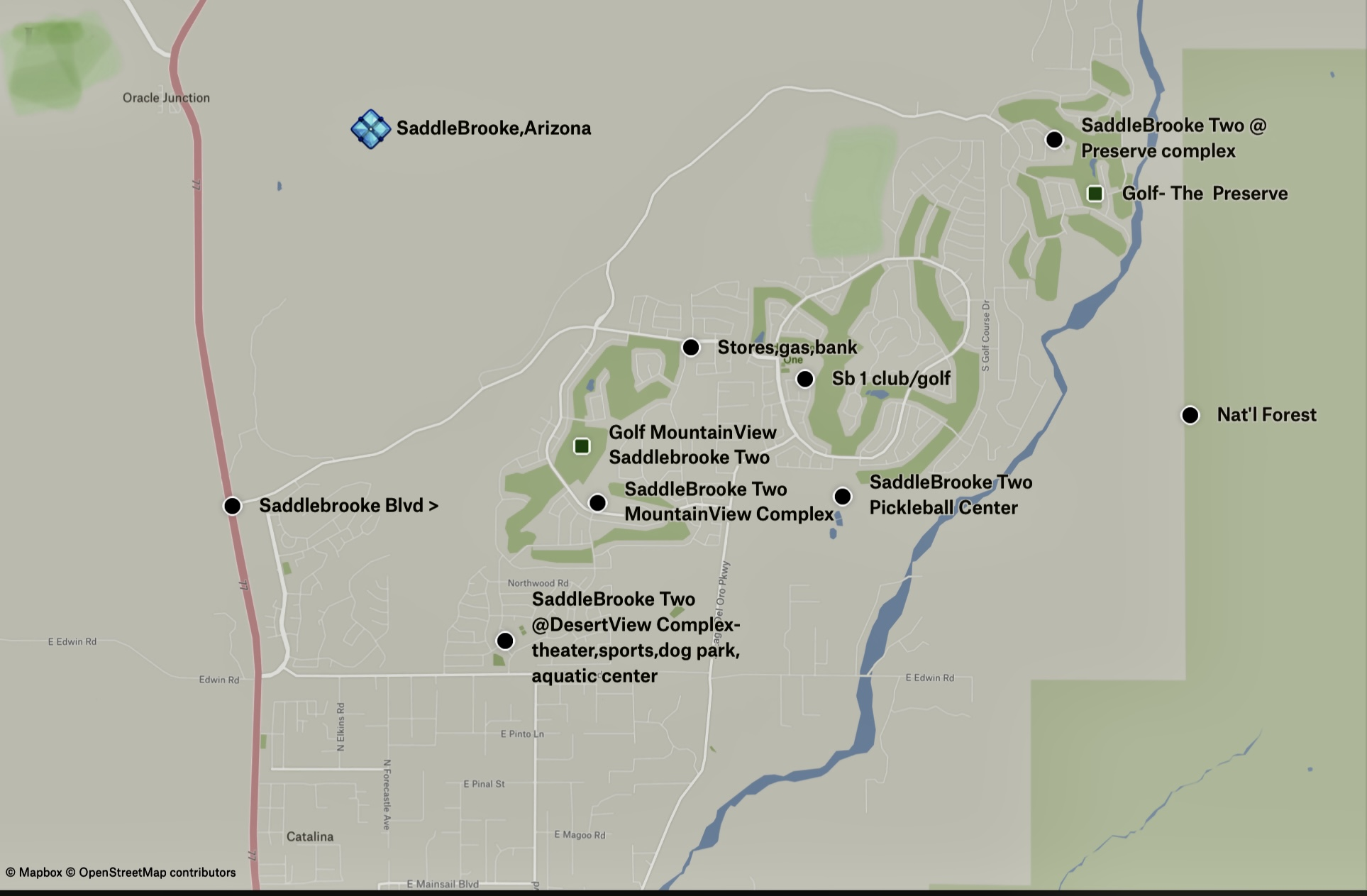
SaddleBrooke, Arizona core villages within the CDP
