= Lower Santan Village, Arizona =

CDP in Pinal County, Arizona

- CDP
- Location within the state of Arizona Lower Santan Village (the United States)
- Coordinates: 33°08′34″N 111°47′07″W
- Country: United States
- State: Arizona
- County: Pinal

Area
  - Total: 4.16 sq mi (10.78 km^{2})
  - Land: 4.16 sq mi (10.78 km^{2})
  - Water: 0 sq mi (0.00 km^{2})
- Elevation: 1,234 ft (376 m)

Population (2020)
  - Total: 437
  - Density: 105.0/sq mi (40.54/km^{2})
- Time zone: UTC-7 (MST)
- ZIP code: 85128
- Area code: 520
- FIPS code: 04-42460
- GNIS feature ID: 2612140

Lower Santan Village is a census-designated place (CDP) on the Gila River Indian Reservation in Pinal County, Arizona, United States. The population was 374 at the 2010 census.

== Geography ==
Lower Santan Village is located at 33°08′34″N 111°47′07″W (33.142754, −111.78532). According to the United States Geological Survey, the CDP has a total area of 4.15 square miles (10.7 km^{2}), all land.

== Demographics ==
Historical population
Census	Pop.	Note	%±
2010	374		—
2020	437		16.8%
U.S. Decennial Census

As of the 2010 census, there were 374 people living in the CDP: 177 male and 197 female. 144 were 19 years old or younger, 75 were ages 20–34, 66 were between the ages of 35 and 49, 75 were between 50 and 64, and the remaining 14 were aged 65 and above. The median age was 26.8 years.

The racial makeup of the CDP was 96.8% American Indian, 1.6% White, 0.3% Black or African American, and 1.3% two or more races. 15.8% of the population were Hispanic or Latino of any race.

There were 98 households in the CDP, 84 family households (85.7%) and 14 non-family households (14.3%), with an average household size of 3.68. Of the family households, 32 were married couples living together, while there were 11 single fathers and 41 single mothers; the non-family households included 9 adults living alone: 6 male and 3 female.

The CDP contained 103 housing units, of which 98 were occupied and 5 were vacant.
