= Stanfield, Arizona =

CDP in Pinal County, Arizona

- CDP
- Location in Pinal County and the state of Arizona

- Location in the United States
- Coordinates: 32°52′54″N 111°57′49″W
- Country: United States
- State: Arizona
- County: Pinal

Area
  - Total: 3.93 sq mi (10.19 km^{2})
  - Land: 3.93 sq mi (10.17 km^{2})
  - Water: 0.0077 sq mi (0.02 km^{2})
- Elevation: 1,302 ft (397 m)

Population (2020)
  - Total: 558
  - Density: 142.1/sq mi (54.87/km^{2})
- Time zone: UTC-7 (MST (no DST))
- ZIP code: 85172
- Area code: 520
- FIPS code: 04-69130
- GNIS feature ID: 11780

Stanfield (English: /ˈstænfiːld/) is a census-designated place (CDP) in Pinal County, Arizona, United States. The population was 651 at the 2000 census. Shamrock Farms operates a farm in Stanfield.

== Geography ==
Stanfield is located at 32°52′54″N 111°57′49″W (32.881612, -111.963473).

According to the United States Census Bureau, the CDP has a total area of 4.0 square miles (10 km^{2}), all land.

== Demographics ==
Historical population
Census	Pop.	Note	%±
2020	558		—
U.S. Decennial Census

At the 2000 census there were 651 people, 187 households, and 146 families living in the CDP. The population density was 164.2 inhabitants per square mile (63.4/km^{2}). There were 202 housing units at an average density of 51.0 per square mile (19.7/km^{2}). The racial makeup of the CDP was 50.7% White, 4.0% Black or African American, 11.4% Native American, 0.9% Pacific Islander, 30.9% from other races, and 2.2% from two or more races. 61.6% of the population were Hispanic or Latino of any race. Of the 187 households 37.4% had children under the age of 18 living with them, 44.9% were married couples living together, 23.5% had a female householder with no husband present, and 21.9% were non-families. 17.1% of households were one person and 9.1% were one person aged 65 or older. The average household size was 3.48 and the average family size was 3.94.

The age distribution was 32.6% under the age of 18, 11.8% from 18 to 24, 28.0% from 25 to 44, 17.7% from 45 to 64, and 10.0% 65 or older. The median age was 28 years. For every 100 females, there were 101.5 males. For every 100 females age 18 and over, there were 100.5 males.

The median household income was $22,391 and the median family income was $32,614. Males had a median income of $15,938 versus $15,000 for females. The per capita income for the CDP was $9,210. About 32.1% of families and 32.6% of the population were below the poverty line, including 51.9% of those under age 18 and 20.0% of people of age 65 or over.

== Education ==
It is within the Stanfield Elementary School District and the Casa Grande Union High School District.
