= Stotonic Village, Arizona =

Community in Pinal County, Arizona, US

Stotonic Village, Arizona O'odham: S-totoñigk
- CDP
- Location of Stotonic Village in Pinal County, Arizona.

- Location in the United States
- Country: United States
- State: Arizona
- County: Pinal

Area
  - Total: 5.11 sq mi (13.23 km^{2})
  - Land: 5.11 sq mi (13.23 km^{2})
  - Water: 0 sq mi (0.00 km^{2})

Population (2020)
  - Total: 610
  - Density: 119/sq mi (46.1/km^{2})
- Time zone: UTC-7 (MST (no DST))
- ZIP code: 85128
- Area code: 520
- FIPS code: 04-69872

Stotonic (O'odham: S-totoñigk place that is full of ants) is a census-designated place (CDP) in Pinal County, Arizona, United States, located in the Gila River Indian Community. The population was 659 at the 2010 census. Stotonic Village has a median household income of $2,499 – the lowest of any CDP in Arizona

== Demographics ==
Historical population
| Census | Pop. | Note | %± |
|---|---|---|---|
| 2010 | 659 | | — |
| 2020 | 610 | | −7.4% |
U.S. Decennial Census

As of the census of 2010, there were 659 people living in the CDP. The population density was 133.0 people per square mile. The racial makeup of the CDP was 2.6% White, 0.6% Black or African American, 92.6% Native American, 0.2% Pacific Islander, 1.1% from other races, and 3.0% from two or more races. 15.5% of the population were Hispanic or Latino of any race.

== Notes ==
- Stotonic Village CDP 33°09′10″N 111°49′00″W
- U.S. Geological Survey Geographic Names Information System: Stotonic (Populated Place)
