= Wet Camp Village, Arizona =

CDP in Pinal County, Arizona

- CDP
- Location of Wet Camp Village in Pinal County, Arizona.

- Location in the United States
- Coordinates: 33°8′29″N 111°54′4″W
- Country: United States
- State: Arizona
- County: Pinal

Area
  - Total: 4.59 sq mi (11.90 km^{2})
  - Land: 4.59 sq mi (11.90 km^{2})
  - Water: 0 sq mi (0.00 km^{2})

Population (2020)
  - Total: 300
  - Density: 65/sq mi (25.2/km^{2})
- Time zone: UTC-7 (MST (no DST))
- FIPS code: 04-82060

Wet Camp Village is a census-designated place in Pinal County, in the U.S. state of Arizona. The population was 229 at the 2010 census.

== Demographics ==
Historical population
| Census | Pop. | Note | %± |
|---|---|---|---|
| 2010 | 229 | | — |
| 2020 | 300 | | 31.0% |
U.S. Decennial Census
