= Cactus Forest, Arizona =

CDP in Pinal County, Arizona

- CDP
- Location of Cactus Forest in Pinal County, Arizona.

- Location in the United States
- Coordinates: 32°57′28″N 111°19′1″W
- Country: United States
- State: Arizona
- County: Pinal

Area
  - Total: 2.73 sq mi (7.08 km^{2})
  - Land: 2.73 sq mi (7.08 km^{2})
  - Water: 0 sq mi (0.00 km^{2})

Population (2020)
  - Total: 606
  - Density: 221.8/sq mi (85.64/km^{2})
- Time zone: UTC-7 (MST (no DST))
- ZIP code: 85132
- Area code: 520
- FIPS code: 04-08990

Cactus Forest is a census-designated place (CDP) roughly sixty-nine miles southeast of Phoenix in Pinal County, Arizona, United States. The population was 594 at the 2010 census.

== Demographics ==
Historical population
Census	Pop.	Note	%±
2010	594		—
2020	606		2.0%
U.S. Decennial Census

Cactus Forest first appeared on the 2010 U.S. Census as a census-designated place (CDP).

As of the census of 2010, there were 594 people living in the CDP. The population density was 217.4 people per square mile. The racial makeup of the CDP was 87% White, 2% Black or African American, 4% Native American, <1% Asian, 5% from other races, and 3% from two or more races. 21% of the population were Hispanic or Latino of any race.

== Education ==
It is within the Florence Unified School District.
