= Blackwater, Arizona =

CDP in Pinal County, Arizona

- CDP
- Location of Blackwater in Pinal County, Arizona.

- Location in the United States
- Coordinates: 33°1′56″N 111°35′45″W
- Country: United States
- State: Arizona
- County: Pinal

Area
  - Total: 17.90 sq mi (46.35 km^{2})
  - Land: 17.90 sq mi (46.35 km^{2})
  - Water: 0 sq mi (0.00 km^{2})
- Elevation: 1,381 ft (421 m)

Population (2020)
  - Total: 1,190
  - Density: 66.5/sq mi (25.67/km^{2})
- Time zone: UTC-7 (Mountain (MST))
- Postal code: 85228
- Area code: 520
- FIPS code: 04-06820
- GNIS feature ID: 0001657

Blackwater is a native village and census-designated place (CDP) on the Gila River Reservation in Pinal County, Arizona, United States. The population was 1,062 at the 2010 census, up from 504 in 2000.

== Geography ==
Blackwater is located at 33°1′56″N 111°35′45″W (33.032359, -111.595938). It is located northeast of Coolidge.

According to the United States Census Bureau, the CDP has a total area of 17.9 square miles (46 km^{2}), all land.

== Demographics ==
Historical population
Census	Pop.	Note	%±
1990	400		—
2000	504		26.0%
2010	1,062		110.7%
2020	1,190		12.1%
U.S. Decennial Census

Blackwater first appeared on the 1990 U.S. Census as a census-designated place (CDP).

=== 2020 census ===
As of the 2020 census, Blackwater had a population of 1,190. The median age was 30.6 years. 31.2% of residents were under the age of 18 and 10.3% of residents were 65 years of age or older. For every 100 females there were 86.5 males, and for every 100 females age 18 and over there were 73.9 males age 18 and over.

0.0% of residents lived in urban areas, while 100.0% lived in rural areas.

There were 346 households in Blackwater, of which 47.4% had children under the age of 18 living in them. Of all households, 18.8% were married-couple households, 23.7% were households with a male householder and no spouse or partner present, and 41.9% were households with a female householder and no spouse or partner present. About 24.0% of all households were made up of individuals and 4.9% had someone living alone who was 65 years of age or older.

There were 360 housing units, of which 3.9% were vacant. The homeowner vacancy rate was 0.0% and the rental vacancy rate was 2.1%.

Racial composition as of the 2020 census
Race	Number	Percent
White	20	1.7%
Black or African American	1	0.1%
American Indian and Alaska Native	1,098	92.3%
Asian	2	0.2%
Native Hawaiian and Other Pacific Islander	0	0.0%
Some other race	28	2.4%
Two or more races	41	3.4%
Hispanic or Latino (of any race)	189	15.9%

=== 2000 census ===
As of the 2000 census, there were 504 people, 135 households, and 110 families residing in the CDP. The population density was 76.5 inhabitants per square mile (29.5/km^{2}). There were 140 housing units at an average density of 21.3 per square mile (8.2/km^{2}). The racial makeup of the CDP was 95% Native American, 1% White, 3% from other races, and 1% from two or more races. 15% of the population were Hispanic or Latino of any race.

There were 135 households, out of which 48% had children under the age of 18 living with them, 34% were married couples living together, 34% had a female householder with no husband present, and 18% were non-families. 13% of all households were made up of individuals, and 4% had someone living alone who was 65 years of age or older. The average household size was 3.7 and the average family size was 4.0.

In the CDP the population was spread out, with 42% under the age of 18, 12% from 18 to 24, 23% from 25 to 44, 18% from 45 to 64, and 6% who were 65 years of age or older. The median age was 22 years. For every 100 females there were 90.2 males. For every 100 females age 18 and over, there were 98.0 males.

The median income for a household in the CDP was $33,438, and the median income for a family was $28,854. Males had a median income of $35,909 versus $31,250 for females. The per capita income for the CDP was $8,674. About 30% of families and 27% of the population were below the poverty line, including 22% of those under age 18 and 63% of those age 65 or over.

=== Income and poverty ===
In 2010, Blackwater had the lowest median household income of all places in the United States with a population over 1,000.

== Government ==
Blackwater is part of District 1 of the Gila River Indian Community.

== Education ==
Blackwater Community School, a grade K–2 Bureau of Indian Education Grant School, and Akimel O'Otham Pee Posh Charter School Inc., a grade 3–5 state charter school, are co-located and operate de facto as a single school. Blackwater Community School opened in 1939 to serve Blackwater and Sacaton Flats. Initially the school had fewer than 100 students. In 2000 the charter school opened; the U.S. Congress had a moratorium on the expansion of BIE schools, and the Blackwater community wanted an expansion of the Blackwater Community School. The charter school opened as a way of expanding the school.

Blackwater is located in the Coolidge Unified School District. Its primary and secondary schools are: Heartland Ranch and West elementary schools; Hohokam Middle School, and Coolidge High School.

== Transportation ==
Gila River Transit operates a service connecting Blackwater with Sacaton.
