= Sweet Water Village, Arizona =

CDP in Pinal County, Arizona

Sweet Water Village, Arizona O'odham: S-iʼovĭ Shu:dagĭ
- CDP
- Location of Sweet Water Village in Pinal County, Arizona.

- Location in the United States
- Coordinates: 33°7′12″N 111°50′16″W
- Country: United States
- State: Arizona
- County: Pinal

Area
  - Total: 0.80 sq mi (2.07 km^{2})
  - Land: 0.80 sq mi (2.07 km^{2})
  - Water: 0 sq mi (0.00 km^{2})

Population (2020)
  - Total: 123
  - Density: 153.8/sq mi (59.38/km^{2})
- Time zone: UTC-7 (MST (no DST))
- ZIP code: 85128
- Area code: 520
- FIPS code: 04-71642

Sweet Water Village (O'odham: S-iʼovĭ Shu:dagĭ) is a census-designated place (CDP) in Pinal County, Arizona, United States, located in the Gila River Indian Community. The population was 83 at the 2010 census.

== Demographics ==
Historical population
| Census | Pop. | Note | %± |
|---|---|---|---|
| 2010 | 83 | | — |
| 2020 | 123 | | 48.2% |
U.S. Decennial Census

As of the census of 2010, there were 83 people living in the CDP. The population density was 103.8 inhabitants per square mile (40.1/km^{2}). The racial makeup of the CDP was 1% White, 98% Native American, and 1% from two or more races. 19% of the population were Hispanic or Latino of any race.
