= Goodyear Village, Arizona =

CDP in Pinal County, Arizona

Goodyear Village, Arizona O'odham: Valin Dak
- CDP
- Location of Goodyear Village in Pinal County, Arizona.

- Location in the United States
- Coordinates: 33°11′50″N 111°52′21″W
- Country: United States
- State: Arizona
- County: Pinal

Area
  - Total: 3.35 sq mi (8.68 km^{2})
  - Land: 3.35 sq mi (8.68 km^{2})
  - Water: 0 sq mi (0.00 km^{2})

Population (2020)
  - Total: 463
  - Density: 138.1/sq mi (53.34/km^{2})
- Time zone: UTC-7 (MST (no DST))
- ZIP code: 85248
- Area code: 520
- FIPS code: 04-28465

Goodyear Village (O'odham: Valin Dak) is a census-designated place (CDP) in Pinal County, Arizona, United States, located in the Gila River Indian Community. The population was 457 at the 2010 census.

== Demographics ==
Historical population
Census	Pop.	Note	%±
2010	457		—
2020	463		1.3%
U.S. Decennial Census

As of the census of 2010, there were 457 people living in the CDP. The population density was 136.1 people per square mile. The racial makeup of the CDP was 6% White, 1% Black or African American, 91% Native American, 2% from other races, and 2% from two or more races. 26% of the population were Hispanic or Latino of any race.
