= Top-of-the-World, Arizona =

CDP in Gila County, Arizona

- Census-designated place
- Location in Gila County and the state of Arizona

- Location in the United States
- Coordinates: 33°20′49″N 110°59′43″W
- Country: United States
- State: Arizona
- Counties: Gila, Pinal

Area
  - Total: 6.06 sq mi (15.70 km^{2})
  - Land: 6.06 sq mi (15.70 km^{2})
  - Water: 0 sq mi (0.00 km^{2})
- Elevation: 4,530 ft (1,380 m)

Population (2020)
  - Total: 274
  - Density: 31.2/sq mi (12.04/km^{2})
- Time zone: UTC-7 (MST (no DST))
- FIPS code: 04-74820
- GNIS feature ID: 1853171

Top-of-the-World is a census-designated place (CDP) in Gila and Pinal counties in the U.S. state of Arizona. The population was 274 at the 2020 census, up from 231 at the 2010 census, and down from 330 at the 2000 census.

== Geography ==
Top-of-the-World is located in eastern Pinal County at 33°20′49″N 110°59′43″W (33.346856, -110.995172). The CDP extends east into Gila County. U.S. Route 60 passes through the center of the community, leading east 15 miles (24 km) to Globe and southwest 8 miles (13 km) to Superior. The center of Phoenix is 72 miles (116 km) to the west.

According to the United States Census Bureau, the CDP has a total area of 6.1 square miles (15.7 km^{2}), all land.

== History ==
Located on US-60, 9.1 miles (14 km) west of Miami, at the divide between Miami and Superior, this area is mostly in Pinal County. Mason's Valley is named after Charles G. Masonm an early settler in Florence, Arizona and a prospector who, with others, discovered the Globe mining district and developed the Silver King Mine north of Superior. Mason's Valley is often called both Pinal Ranch and Top-of-the-World, the latter being an unfortunate misnomer from a much later camping and recreation facility that was created in 1922, located on the old alignment of US-60 in Gila County about two miles west, not in Mason's Valley.

The name "Pinal" is taken from Pinar, Spanish for "pine groves in the mountains," and is the name of the Mountain Range South of Globe, west to Superior, and north to the Salt River. These Mountains were home to the Western Apache Pinal Band of Native Americans, whom the US Military found particularly vexing for their frequent raids to surrounding settlements, ranches, and mines. “(the troops) at Camp Pinal, and its dependencies will clear the country (of Indians) lying between the Gila and Salt Rivers and the western boundary of the White Mountain Reservation.” As a consequence in 1870 a camp was ordered built in the Pinal Mountains to house an infantry camp to serve as a supply post and bivouac camp for Cavalry fighting the Apaches in the mountains. The two dependent camps of Camp Pinal were Camp Picket Post ten miles east on Queen Creek, and a small detachment at a construction camp on the Upper Stoneman Grade called Camp Supply where stone ovens were built and bread for both camps was baked.

The original camp, called Infantry Camp, was located four miles southeast of Mason's Valley on the divide between Mineral Creek and Pinto Creek at the location of the future Gibson Mine and Bellevue settlement. “A military post is ordered established in the Pinal Mountains, some 50 miles north of Grant, to be called ‘Infantry Camp’. “INFANTRY CAMP, Mason’s Valley, A.T.,. - ...on one of the many dry forks at the head of Mineral Creek, a tributary of the Gila. …estimated distance from Camp Grant, fifty-two miles.” “…Stores continue to arrive regular per ‘Hog Express’ as package was marked”. The camp was there a very short time before being relocated to Mason's Valley, but was still called Infantry Camp. Five months after relocation the Military ordered the name changed to Camp Pinal, and a picket post of Camp Pinal to be located at the foot of Tortilla Mountain on Queen Creek, General Stoneman established both camps and constructed the mule trail between the famously known of Stoneman's Grade.

The site was abandoned in late in 1871, the last printed mention of troops there was October 20. The troops started the Stoneman Grade at Camp Picket Post at the foot of Picket post Mountain on Queen Creek. It did not enter Queen Creek Canyon. The trail traveled north from Camp Picket Post, up the face of Kings Crown Mountain, around the peak across the headwaters of Queen Creek, across Oak Flats, Devil's Canyon, and up Irion Canyon to Camp Pinal. The military efforts of Stoneman cleared the Southern Pinal Mountains of Apaches, and the Stoneman Grade was the way most early miners and settlers traveled to the Globe-Miami District.

The Pinal Ranch was built at the site of Camp Pinal. The ranch was begun before 1874. First owned by Andy Hawkins and partner Thomas Buchanan. “They built a fine juniper house, corrals and outbuildings. In 1877 they produced 30,000 pounds of potatoes.” Hospitality business was good providing shelter and food for travelers on the Stoneman Trail to Globe. In 1877 Mr. and Mrs. Robert A. Irion and Mrs. Irion's young son Dudley Craig bought out Andy Hawkins.16 The Irion's improved upon the ranch, and around 1880 bought Buchanan's share and it remained in the Craig family until the 1970s. The large adobe ranch house is still in good condition, in spite of its 100+ years. They had productive fields for corn and vegetables, and planted a large and productive apple orchard in addition to running cattle on their range. His stepson Dudley Craig continued the ranching tradition in the area after Irion's death.

“We crossed the lofty Pinal Range over into the beautiful little nook known as Mason’s Valley.” Today Mason’s Valley is often called both Pinal Ranch and Top-of-the-World, the latter being an unfortunate misnomer from a much later camping and recreation facility that was created in 1922 located on the old alignment of US-60 in Gila County about two miles west, not in Mason’s Valley.

== Demographics ==
Historical population
Census	Pop.	Note	%±
2020	189		—
U.S. Decennial Census

As of the census of 2000, there were 330 people, 130 households, and 82 families residing in the CDP. The population density was 54.6 inhabitants per square mile (21.1/km^{2}). There were 184 housing units at an average density of 30.5 per square mile (11.8/km^{2}). The racial makeup of the CDP was 88.8% White, 1.5% Black or African American, 3.0% Native American, 4.2% from other races, and 2.4% from two or more races. 19.1% of the population were Hispanic or Latino of any race.

There were 130 households, out of which 31.5% had children under the age of 18 living with them, 50.0% were married couples living together, 10.0% had a female householder with no husband present, and 36.2% were non-families. 31.5% of all households were made up of individuals, and 10.8% had someone living alone who was 65 years of age or older. The average household size was 2.45 and the average family size was 3.07.

In the CDP, the population was spread out, with 27.6% under the age of 18, 5.5% from 18 to 24, 27.9% from 25 to 44, 24.5% from 45 to 64, and 14.5% who were 65 years of age or older. The median age was 39 years. For every 100 females, there were 91.9 males. For every 100 females age 18 and over, there were 88.2 males.

The median income for a household in the CDP was $52,731, and the median income for a family was $53,438. Males had a median income of $43,813 versus $19,792 for females. The per capita income for the CDP was $21,039. About 5.6% of families and 5.2% of the population were below the poverty line, including 7.1% of those under age 18 and none of those age 65 or over.

== Education ==
The Pinal County portion is in the Superior Unified School District.

The Gila County portion is in the Miami Unified School District.
