= Santa Cruz, Arizona =

CDP in Pinal County, Arizona

Santa Cruz, Arizona Hia-t-ab (O'odham)
- CDP
- Location of Santa Cruz in Pinal County, Arizona.

- Location in Arizona
- Coordinates: 33°13′58″N 112°9′34″W
- Country: United States
- State: Arizona
- County: Pinal

Area
  - Total: 1.63 sq mi (4.22 km^{2})
  - Land: 1.63 sq mi (4.22 km^{2})
  - Water: 0 sq mi (0.00 km^{2})

Population (2020)
  - Total: 39
  - Density: 24.0/sq mi (9.25/km^{2})
- Time zone: UTC-7 (MST (no DST))
- ZIP code: 85339
- Area code: 520
- FIPS code: 04-63960

Santa Cruz (O'odham: Hia-t-ab) is a census-designated place (CDP) in Pinal County, Arizona, United States, located in the Gila River Indian Community. The population was 37 at the 2010 census.

== Demographics ==
Historical population
Census	Pop.	Note	%±
2010	37		—
2020	39		5.4%
U.S. Decennial Census

As of the census of 2010, there were 37 people living in the CDP. The population density was 22.7 people per square mile. The racial makeup of the CDP was 97% Native American and 3% from other races. 8% of the population were Hispanic or Latino of any race.
