= Gold Canyon, Arizona =

- Census-designated place
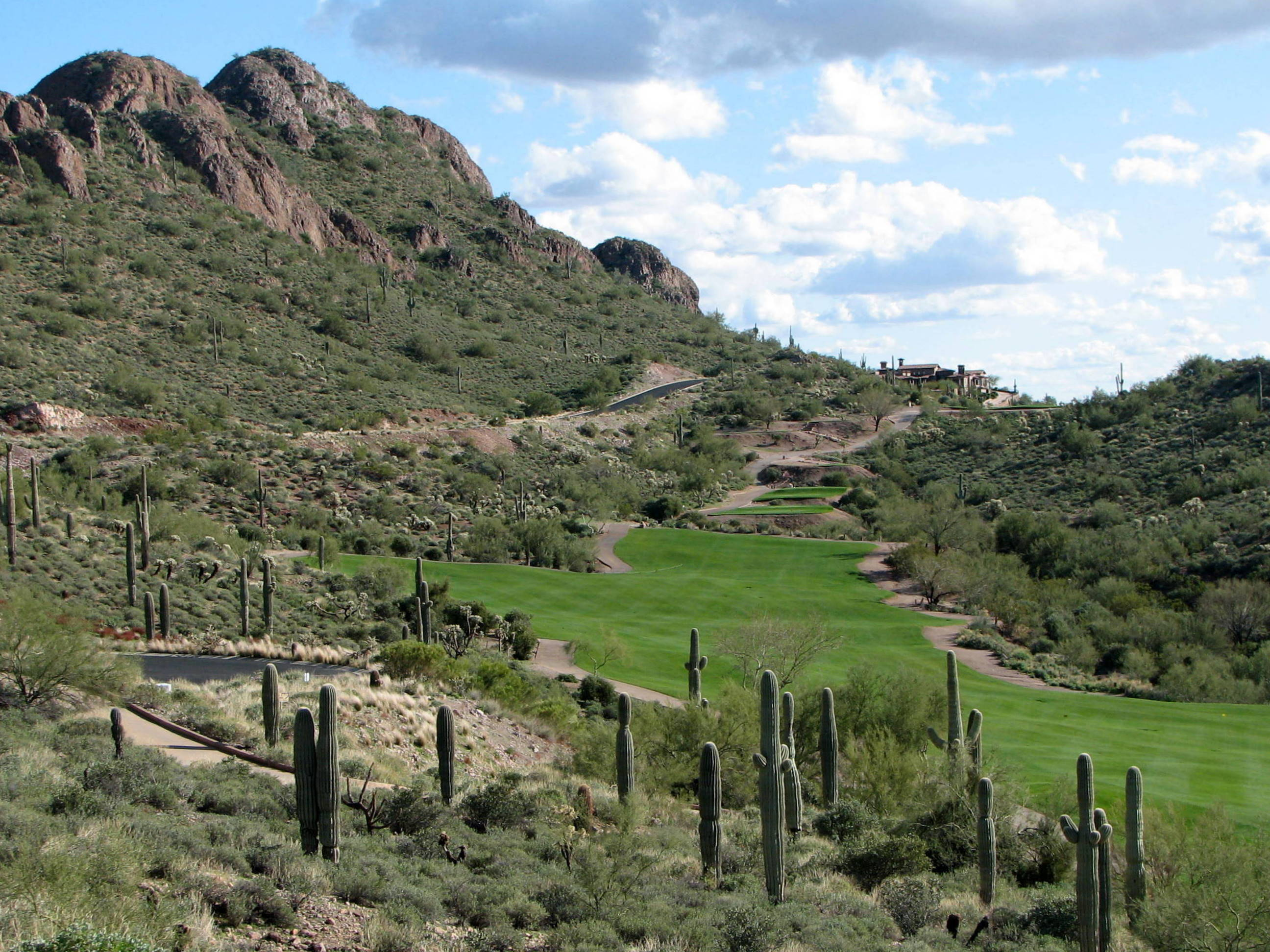
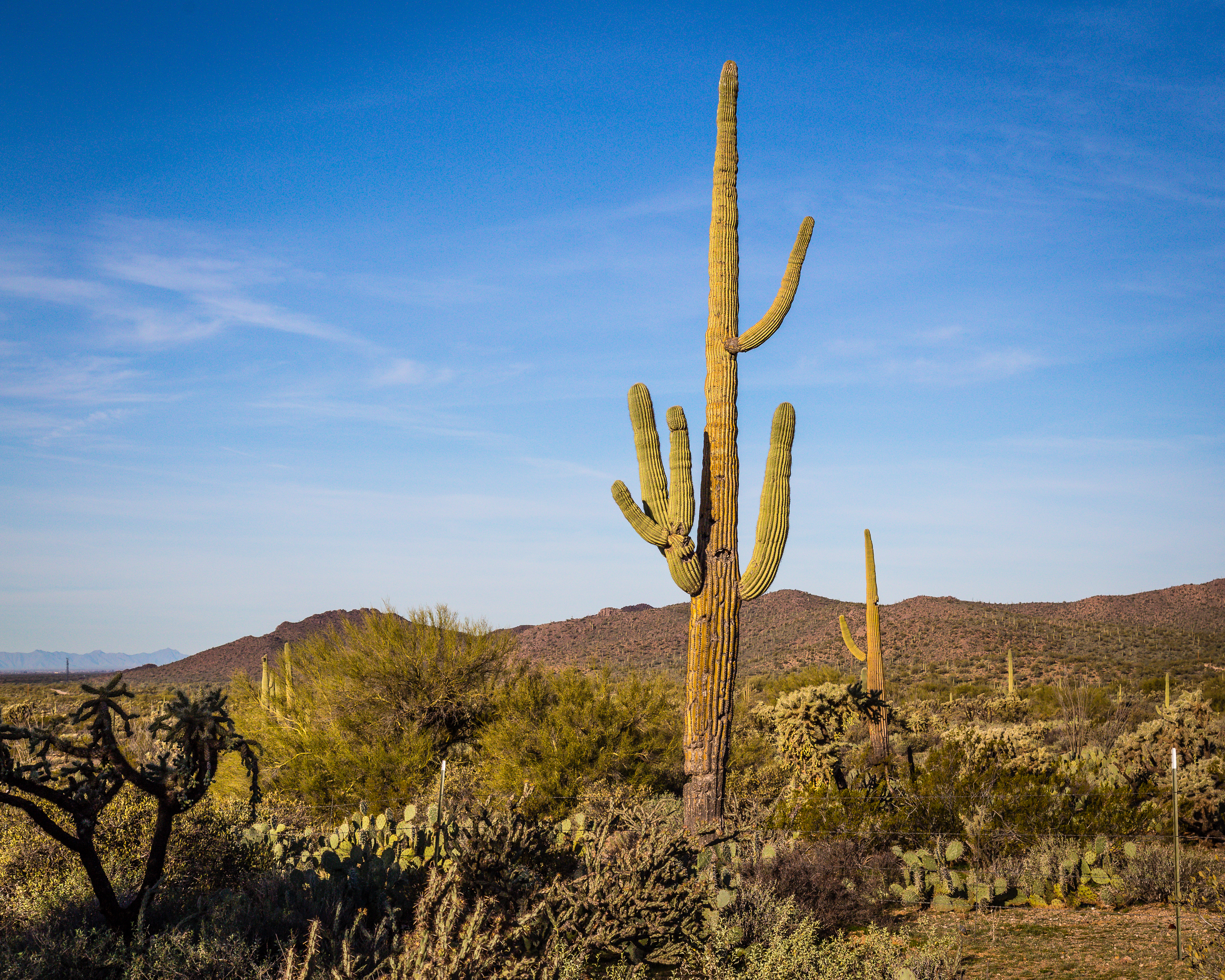
- Top: A golf course in Gold Canyon. Bottom: U.S. Route 60 near Gold Canyon.

- Flag

- Location of Gold Canyon in Pinal County, Arizona

- Location in the United States
- Coordinates: 33°21′43″N 111°27′6″W
- Country: United States
- State: Arizona
- County: Pinal

Area
  - Total: 28.67 sq mi (74.26 km^{2})
  - Land: 28.67 sq mi (74.26 km^{2})
  - Water: 0 sq mi (0.00 km^{2})
- Elevation: 1,913 ft (583 m)

Population (2020)
  - Total: 11,404
  - Density: 397.8/sq mi (153.58/km^{2})
- Time zone: UTC-7 (MST (no DST))
- ZIP code: 85118
- Area code: 480
- FIPS code: 04-28120
- GNIS feature ID: 2408303
- Website: http://www.goldcanyon.net/

Gold Canyon is a census-designated place (CDP) and unincorporated community in Pinal County, Arizona, United States.

== Geography ==
Gold Canyon is located at 33°21′43″N 111°27′6″W (33.361913, -111.451629). According to the United States Census Bureau, Gold Canyon has a total area of 22.3 square miles (57.8 km^{2}), all of it land. The community is situated along U.S. Route 60. Peralta Regional Park, a 498-acre regional park located east of Peralta Road, opened on January 11, 2023.

== Demographics ==
Historical population
Census	Pop.	Note	%±
2000	6,029		—
2010	10,159		68.5%
2020	11,404		12.3%
U.S. Decennial Census

=== 2000 census ===
At the 2000 census there were 6,029 people, 2,785 households, and 2,211 families in the CDP. The population density was 270.0 inhabitants per square mile (104.2/km^{2}). There were 4,139 housing units at an average density of 185.4 per square mile (71.6/km^{2}). The racial makup of the CDP was 96.2% White, 0.3% Black or African American, 0.7% Native American, 0.5% Asian, 0.1% Pacific Islander, 1.4% from other races, and 0.9% from two or more races. 3.5%. were Hispanic or Latino of any race.

Of the 2,785 households 13.0% had children under the age of 18 living with them, 73.8% were married couples living together, 3.5% had a female householder with no husband present, and 20.6% were non-families. 16.1% of households were one person and 6.4% were one person aged 65 or older. The average household size was 2.16 and the average family size was 2.38.

The age distribution was 12.4% under the age of 18, 3.0% from 18 to 24, 17.8% from 25 to 44, 37.0% from 45 to 64, and 29.8% 65 or older. The median age was 56 years. For every 100 females, there were 95.9 males. For every 100 females age 18 and over, there were 95.5 males.

The median household income was $57,705 and the median family income was $60,438. Males had a median income of $47,727 versus $31,583 for females. The per capita income for the CDP was $35,010. About 2.8% of families and 3.8% of the population were below the poverty line, including 10.6% of those under age 18 and 2.4% of those age 65 or over.

=== 2020 census ===
As of the 2020 census, the median age was 66.8 years. 5.2% of residents were under the age of 18 and 55.5% of residents were 65 years of age or older. For every 100 females there were 95.8 males, and for every 100 females age 18 and over there were 94.7 males age 18 and over.

85.0% of residents lived in urban areas, while 15.0% lived in rural areas.

There were 5,839 households in Gold Canyon, of which 6.4% had children under the age of 18 living in them. Of all households, 65.3% were married-couple households, 12.2% were households with a male householder and no spouse or partner present, and 17.6% were households with a female householder and no spouse or partner present. About 24.5% of all households were made up of individuals and 17.3% had someone living alone who was 65 years of age or older.

There were 7,948 housing units, of which 26.5% were vacant. The homeowner vacancy rate was 3.1% and the rental vacancy rate was 15.4%.

Racial composition as of the 2020 census
Race	Number	Percent
White	10,351	90.8%
Black or African American	75	0.7%
American Indian and Alaska Native	63	0.6%
Asian	108	0.9%
Native Hawaiian and Other Pacific Islander	6	0.1%
Some other race	173	1.5%
Two or more races	628	5.5%
Hispanic or Latino (of any race)	688	6.0%

== History ==
In 2023, a shooting occurred in Gold Canyon. A women was shot and later transported to a hospital, where she later died from her injuries. A man was found dead at the scene from a self-inflicted gunshot wound. A 7-year-old boy who was present during the shooting was shot and sustained minor injuries. Two years later, in 2025, a car crash left four people dead near Gold Canyon.

In November 2025, a large law enforcement operation closed both directions of U.S. Route 60 near Gold Canyon for several hours after the Mesa Police Department located 42-year-old Justin Meritt, who was wanted in connection with multiple felony offenses, including crimes against children. After Meritt refused to exit his vehicle during a traffic stop, a SWAT team was deployed to the scene. Officers later found him dead inside the vehicle from an apparent self-inflicted gunshot wound. The highway remained closed until the evening while authorities conducted their investigation.

== Government ==
Gold Canyon is served by the Pinal County Sheriff's Office for law enforcement and is part of the Apache Junction Unified School District.
