= Upper Santan Village, Arizona =

CDP in Pinal County, Arizona

- CDP
- Location of Upper Santan Village in Pinal County, Arizona.

- Location in the United States
- Coordinates: 33°06′55″N 111°44′31″W
- Country: United States
- State: Arizona
- County: Pinal

Area
  - Total: 6.73 sq mi (17.44 km^{2})
  - Land: 6.73 sq mi (17.44 km^{2})
  - Water: 0 sq mi (0.00 km^{2})

Population (2020)
  - Total: 665
  - Density: 98.8/sq mi (38.14/km^{2})
- Time zone: UTC-7 (MST (no DST))
- FIPS code: 04-78300

Upper Santan Village is a census-designated place (CDP) on the Gila River Indian Reservation in Pinal County, in the U.S. state of Arizona. The population was 495 at the 2010 census.

== Demographics ==
Historical population
Census	Pop.	Note	%±
2010	495		—
2020	665		34.3%
U.S. Decennial Census
