= Queen Valley, Arizona =

CPD in Pinal County, Arizona

- CDP
- Location in Pinal County and the state of Arizona
- Coordinates: 33°17′42″N 111°17′52″W
- Country: United States
- State: Arizona
- County: Pinal

Area
  - Total: 9.74 sq mi (25.22 km^{2})
  - Land: 9.74 sq mi (25.22 km^{2})
  - Water: 0 sq mi (0.00 km^{2})
- Elevation: 2,037 ft (621 m)

Population (2020)
  - Total: 967
  - Density: 99.3/sq mi (38.35/km^{2})
- Time zone: UTC-7 (MST (no DST))
- ZIP code: 85118
- Area code: 520
- FIPS code: 04-58290
- GNIS feature ID: 0040413

Queen Valley is a census-designated place (CDP) in north central Pinal County, Arizona, United States. The population was 820 at the 2000 census.

== Geography ==
Queen Valley is located at 33°17′42″N 111°17′52″W, at an elevation of 2000 feet along the south side of the west flowing Queen Creek. The Tonto National Forest boundary and Comet Peak (2681 ft.) lie 1.5 miles to the east. The dam for the Whitlow Ranch Flood Control Basin is one mile to the east.

Florence Junction lies 5.4 kilometres (3.4 mi) to the southwest along US Route 60 and Queen Valley Road connects Queen Valley with US 60, two miles east of Florence Junction. Apache Junction lies to the northwest. The Superstition Mountains lie to the north and northwest.

According to the United States Census Bureau, the CDP has a total area of 9.6 square miles (24.9 km^{2}), all land.

== Demographics ==
Historical population
Census	Pop.	Note	%±
2000	820		—
2010	788		−3.9%
2020	967		22.7%
U.S. Decennial Census

As of the census of 2000, there were 820 people, 417 households, and 296 families living in the CDP. The population density was 85.3 inhabitants per square mile (32.9/km^{2}). There were 595 housing units at an average density of 61.9 per square mile (23.9/km^{2}). The racial makeup of the CDP was 96.6% White, 0.1% Black or African American, 0.5% Native American, 0.1% Asian, 0.1% Pacific Islander, 1.5% from other races, and 1.1% from two or more races. 6.1% of the population were Hispanic or Latino of any race.

There were 417 households, out of which 5.5% had children under the age of 18 living with them, 67.1% were married couples living together, 2.6% had a female householder with no husband present, and 29.0% were non-families. 24.7% of all households were made up of individuals, and 15.3% had someone living alone who was 65 years of age or older. The average household size was 1.97 and the average family size was 2.26.

In the CDP, the population was spread out, with 7.4% under the age of 18, 1.5% from 18 to 24, 10.4% from 25 to 44, 31.3% from 45 to 64, and 49.4% who were 65 years of age or older. The median age was 65 years. For every 100 females, there were 103.0 males. For every 100 females age 18 and over, there were 100.8 males.

The median income for a household in the CDP was $43,188, and the median income for a family was $44,213. Males had a median income of $42,344 versus $20,764 for females. The per capita income for the CDP was $28,886. None of the families and 5.9% of the population were living below the poverty line, including no under eighteens and 6.1% of those over 64.

== Education ==
It is partially in the Superior Unified School District, and partially in the Apache Junction Unified School District.
