= Sacaton Flats Village, Arizona =

Place in Pinal County, Arizona

Sacaton Flats Village, Arizona O'odham: Ha:shañ Ke:k
- CDP
- Location of Sacaton Flats Village in Pinal County, Arizona.

- Location in the United States
- Coordinates: 33°16′34″N 112°10′1″W
- Country: United States
- State: Arizona
- County: Pinal

Area
  - Total: 6.65 sq mi (17.22 km^{2})
  - Land: 6.65 sq mi (17.22 km^{2})
  - Water: 0 sq mi (0.00 km^{2})

Population (2020)
  - Total: 576
  - Density: 86.7/sq mi (33.46/km^{2})
- Time zone: UTC-7 (MST (no DST))
- FIPS code: 04-61800

Sacaton Flats Village (O'odham: Ha:shañ Ke:k) is a census-designated place (CDP) in Pinal County, Arizona, United States, located in the Gila River Indian Community. The population was 621 at the 2010 census.

== Demographics ==
Historical population
| Census | Pop. | Note | %± |
|---|---|---|---|
| 2000 | 621 | | — |
| 2010 | 541 | | −12.9% |
| 2020 | 576 | | 6.5% |
U.S. Decennial Census

As of the census of 2010, there were 541 people living in the CDP. The population density was 86.8 people per square mile. The racial makeup of the CDP was 96% Native American, 1% White, <1% Black or African American, and 3% from two or more races. 12% of the population were Hispanic or Latino of any race.
