= St. Johns, Maricopa County, Arizona =

CDP in Maricopa County, Arizona

St. Johns, Arizona
- Census-designated place
- Location in Maricopa County, Arizona

- Location within Arizona Location within the United States
- Coordinates: 33°18′16″N 112°11′41″W
- Country: United States
- State: Arizona
- County: Maricopa

Area
  - Total: 2.28 sq mi (5.9 km^{2})
  - Land: 2.28 sq mi (5.9 km^{2})
  - Water: 0.0 sq mi (0 km^{2})
- Elevation: 1,011 ft (308 m)

Population (2020)
  - Total: 690
  - Density: 302.5/sq mi (116.8/km^{2})
- Time zone: UTC-7 (MST (no DST))
- ZIP code: 85339 (Laveen)
- FIPS code: 04-62362
- GNIS feature ID: 2612144

St. Johns is a census-designated place (CDP) in Maricopa County, Arizona, United States, located in the Gila River Indian Community. The population was 690 at the 2020 census, up from 476 at the 2010 census.

== Geography ==
St. Johns is on the south side of the Phoenix metropolitan area, on the northeast side of the valley of the Gila River. It is bordered to the southeast by the communities of Komatke and Gila Crossing. Downtown Phoenix is 15 miles (24 km) to the northeast.

== Demographics ==
As of the census of 2010, there were 476 people living in the CDP. The population density was 208.7 people per square mile. The racial makeup of the CDP was 3% White, <1% Black or African American, 95% Native American, 1% from other races, and 1% from two or more races. 4% of the population were Hispanic or Latino of any race.

== Education ==
It is not in any school district. The K-8 tribal school Gila Crossing Community School, affiliated with the Bureau of Indian Education, is in nearby Komatke.
