= Big Chief Russell Moore =

American jazz trombonist

- Born: August 13, 1912; Gila Crossing, Arizona
- Died: December 15, 1983 (aged 71) Nyack, New York
- Genres: Jazz, Traditional jazz
- Instrument: Trombone
- Years active: 1920s–1980s

"Big Chief" Russell Moore (August 13, 1912 – December 15, 1983) was an American jazz trombonist. Moore, a Pima tribe member, grew up on a Native American reservation before moving to Chicago and then Los Angeles where he learned to play various instruments, eventually settling on trombone. Throughout his career, Moore worked with an array of artists including Frank Sinatra, Lionel Hampton, Alberta Hunter and Pee Wee Russell as well as recording under his own name. He is best remembered for his work as a member of Louis Armstrong's band.

== Life and career ==
=== Early life ===
Moore was born in Gila Crossing, Arizona inside the Gila River Indian Community reservation in 1912 and belonged to the Akimel O'otham tribe. He was one of five children born to mother Amy Bending Moore and father José Newton Moore. Musical performances were important to community life on the reservation particularly due to the inaccessibility of record players and radios. Moore's exposure to music from local school bands as well as traditional Pima music sparked an interest in music from a young age.

Following the death of his father in 1924, Moore and his brother Everett moved to Blue Island, Illinois where they lived with their uncle and aunt, William and Marie Moore. William was a bandleader who taught the brothers trumpet, French horn, trombone, piano, bass, euphonium, and drums. In 1929, Moore left Blue Island and moved to Chicago's South Side where he worked odd jobs. It was there that Moore heard Louis Armstrong play for the first time as he stood outside the Savoy Ballroom. Moore eventually returned to his uncle's home in Blue Island, where his uncle bought him a train ticket to Arizona where Moore was to continue his schooling. Moore enrolled at Tucson High School at the end of 1929 and played trombone in the school band. In 1930, he attended Sherman Indian High School in California and again performed in the school band as well as in local acts. In 1933, Moore graduated and was named "up and coming jazz man of the year."

=== Music career ===
After graduating, Moore moved to Los Angeles and was a freelance musician playing trombone with artists such as Eddie Barefield. His career took a big step forward by joining Lionel Hampton's band in 1935. He departed from Hampton's group when they moved to New York City. Moore stayed in Los Angeles until he ran out of money and then returned to Gila River. After a period of touring with Eli Rice's band, Moore joined Papa Celestin's band in Louisiana. He moved to New Orleans and worked in bands with a number of acts including Kid Rena, A.J. Piron, Paul Barbarin and Ernie Fields.

In the early 1940s, Moore played with Alberta Hunter, Harlan Leonard, and Noble Sissle. At the end of 1944, some musicians from Louis Armstrong's orchestra saw Moore performing in the Jeter-Pillars Orchestra and asked him to meet Armstrong in New York. Following this meeting, Moore played lead trombone with Armstrong's last big band for three years. After the dissolution of Armstrong's orchestra, Moore joined Sidney Bechet's quartet with whom he toured in Europe.

Moore continued his relentless touring in the 1950s with Ruby Braff, Pee Wee Russell, Eddie Condon, Wild Bill Davison, Jimmy McPartland, Tony Parenti, Mezz Mezzrow, Frank Sinatra and Buck Clayton. In 1964, Moore re-joined Armstrong, taking Trummy Young's place in the All Stars. With this line-up, Moore appeared on some famous Armstrong recordings such as Hello Dolly. Moore toured across Europe, Asia, and the Pacific with the All Stars. After leaving the All Stars, Moore played with Lester Lanin's Society Orchestra, including at the inaugural presidential balls of John F. Kennedy, Lyndon B. Johnson, and Richard Nixon. With Lanin, he also played at events in the United Kingdom for Diana Spencer and Prince Charles's wedding. According to Pee Wee Erwin, Moore once met the Duke and Duchess of Windsor, who asked him where they could see him play when they next visited New York. Moore obliged by inviting them to see him play at the Central Plaza, a catering hall with raucous crowds on the Lower East Side.

Moore released two albums under his own name in the 1970s: Russell “Big Chief” Moore’s Pow Wow Jazz Band and Russell Moore Volume II. Both of these albums had extremely limited pressings. In the early 1980s, Moore led a Dixieland band and toured Canada with Cozy Cole and England with Keith Smith. Poor health prevented him from touring any further.

== Later life and death ==
Among Moore's final performances was an appearance on the "Night of the First Americans", a televised performance at the Kennedy Centre, in 1982. He played his own composition called "Chant for Wounded Knee".

Moore died in Nyack, New York after a lengthy illness associated with diabetes in December 1983. His funeral was held at a Presbyterian church in Nyack and featured a six-piece jazz band. Moore was buried at Oak Hill Cemetery.

The New York Times published an obituary for Moore, making him the only member of the Pima tribe to receive one. In 1998, the Russell Moore Music Fest was established at the Gila River Reservation.

== Personal life ==
Moore met Ida Powlas, a member of the Oneida Nation and schoolteacher, in the 1950s. The couple married in 1956 and adopted two children.

Moore was proud of his Native American identity and his "Big Chief" nickname. He often participated in events for the Native American community and encouraged Native American youth to embrace their heritage.

== Discography ==
- Russell "Big Chief" Moore's Powwow Jazz Band (Jazz Art, 1973)
- Russell "Big Chief" Moore, Vol. 2 (Jazz Art, 1975)
