= Circle City, Arizona =

Unincorporated community in Maricopa County, Arizona

- Census-designated place
- Location in Maricopa County, Arizona
- Coordinates: 33°48′54″N 112°34′52″W
- Country: United States
- State: Arizona
- County: Maricopa
- Elevation: 1,864 ft (568 m)
- Time zone: UTC-7 (Mountain (MST))
- ZIP code: 85342 (Morristown)
- FIPS code: 04-13610
- GNIS feature ID: 2805213

Circle City is an unincorporated community and census-designated place (CDP) in Maricopa County, Arizona, United States, located 17 miles (27 km) northwest of Surprise on U.S. Route 60. As of the 2020 census, the population was 522.

== History ==
The development was built in the late 1950s by The Workmen's Circle, a Jewish fraternal and mutual aid society with roots in the socialist movement of the early 20th century. The group created the town as a retirement community for its aging members, but also welcomed anyone over the age of fifty to live in the community. The community welcomed people from all races and religions that were interested a decade before the Fair Housing Act was passed. Ben Schleifer, himself a Jewish immigrant and who created the nearby retirement community of Youngstown, was tasked with designing the community.

== Education ==
It is in the Morristown Elementary School District.
