= Maricopa County, Arizona =

County in Arizona, United States

- County
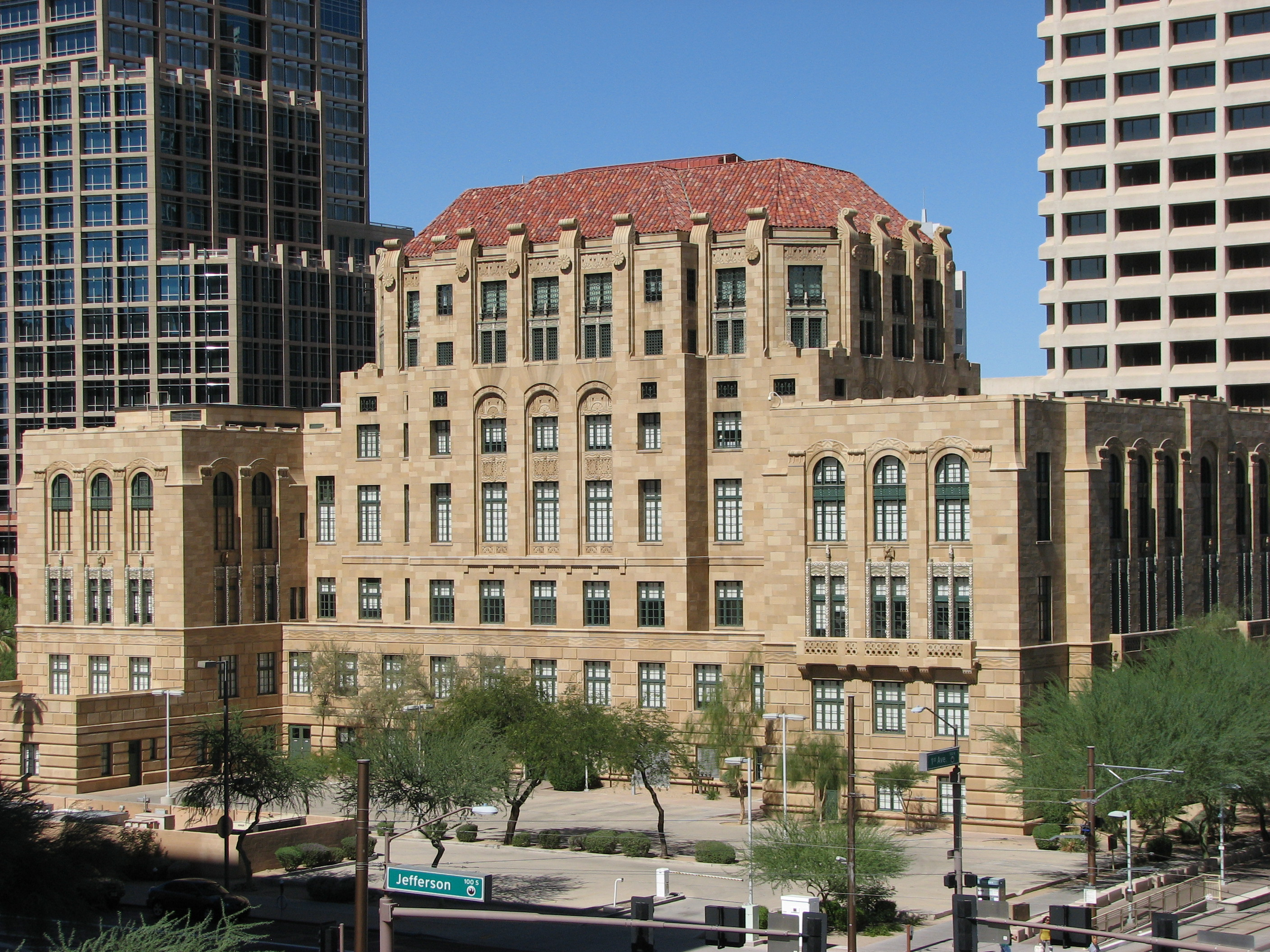
- The Maricopa County Courthouse and Old Phoenix City Hall, also known as the County-City Administration Building, in 2013

- Flag Seal Logo

- Location within the U.S. state of Arizona
- Coordinates: 33°30′50″N 112°28′33″W
- Country: United States
- State: Arizona
- Founded: February 14, 1871
- Named for: Maricopa people
- Seat: Phoenix
- Largest city: Phoenix

Area
  - Total: 9,224 sq mi (23,890 km^{2})
  - Land: 9,200 sq mi (24,000 km^{2})
  - Water: 24 sq mi (62 km^{2}) 0.3%

Population (2020)
  - Total: 4,420,568
  - Estimate (2025): 4,689,558 ▲
  - Density: 480/sq mi (190/km^{2})

GDP
  - Total: $419.250 billion (2024)
- Time zone: UTC−7 (Mountain)
- Congressional districts: 1st, 2nd, 3rd, 4th, 5th, 7th, 8th, 9th
- Website: www.maricopa.gov

Maricopa County (/ˌmærɪˈkoʊpə, ˌmɛər-/ MARR-ih-KOH-pə, MAIR-) is a county in the south-central part of the U.S. state of Arizona. As of the 2020 census the population was 4,420,568, or about 62% of the state's total, making it the fourth-most populous county in the United States and the most populous county in Arizona, and making Arizona one of the nation's most centralized states. The county seat is Phoenix, the state capital and fifth-most populous city in the United States.

Maricopa County is the central county of the Phoenix–Mesa–Chandler Metropolitan Statistical Area. The Office of Management and Budget renamed the metropolitan area in September 2018. Previously, it was the Phoenix–Mesa–Glendale metropolitan area, and in 2000, that was changed to Phoenix–Mesa–Scottsdale.

Maricopa County was named after the Maricopa people. Five Indian reservations are located in the county. The largest are the Salt River Pima–Maricopa Indian Community (east of Scottsdale) and the Gila River Indian Community (south of Chandler).

== Geography ==
According to the United States Census Bureau, the county has a total area of 9,224 sq mi (23,890 km^{2}), of which 24 sq mi (62 km^{2}) (0.3%) is covered by water. Maricopa County is one of the largest counties in the United States by area, with a land area greater than that of four other US states. From west to east, it stretches 132 miles (212 km), and 103 miles (166 km) from north to south. It is by far Arizona's most populous county, encompassing well over half of the state's residents. It is the largest county in the United States to have a capital city.

=== Adjacent counties ===
- La Paz County – west
- Yuma County – west
- Pima County – south
- Pinal County – southeast and south
- Gila County – east
- Yavapai County – north

=== National protected areas ===
- Sonoran Desert National Monument (part)
- Tonto National Forest (part)

=== Regional parks ===
Maricopa County has 14 regional parks:

- Adobe Mountain Desert Park
- Chaparral Lake
- Estrella Mountain Regional Park
- Hassayampa River Preserve
- Indian Mesa
- Lake Pleasant Regional Park
- Litchfield Park, Arizona
- Manistee Ranch
- McCormick-Stillman Railroad Park
- Papago Park
- Phoenix Mountains Preserve
- Sahuaro Ranch
- San Tan Mountain Regional Park
- White Tank Mountain Regional Park.

It also has at least 21 protected areas:

- Big Horn Mountains Wilderness
- Daisy Mountain Preserve
- Deer Valley Petroglyph Preserve
- Eagletail Mountains Wilderness
- Harquahala Mountains
- Hells Canyon Wilderness (Arizona)
- Hummingbird Springs Wilderness
- Mesa Grande
- Mummy Mountain (Arizona)
- National Memorial Cemetery of Arizona
- Painted Rock Petroglyph Site
- Sierra Estrella
- Signal Mountain Wilderness
- Sonoran Desert National Monument
- St. Francis Catholic Cemetery
- Superstition Mountains
- Table Top Mountain (Arizona)
- Tonto National Forest
- Wabayuma Peak
- White Tank Mountain Regional Park
- Woolsey Peak

=== Flora and fauna ===
From 2009 to 2011, an inventory of all vascular plants growing along the Salt River (Arizona), Gila River, New River and Agua Fria River and their tributaries in the Phoenix metropolitan area was done. In October 2022, Maricopa County Environmental Services Department detected Dengue virus in mosquitoes they had trapped; in November the first locally transmitted case of dengue fever was reported in the County and Arizona state as a whole - previous dengue cases in Maricopa County had been related to travel.

== Demographics ==
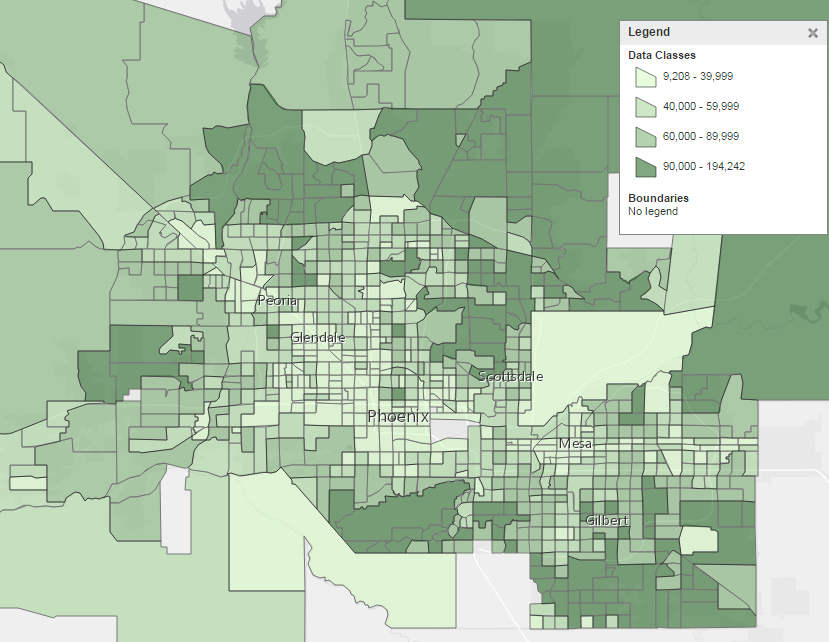
Median Household Income in 2015 across metro Phoenix; the darker the green, the higher the income

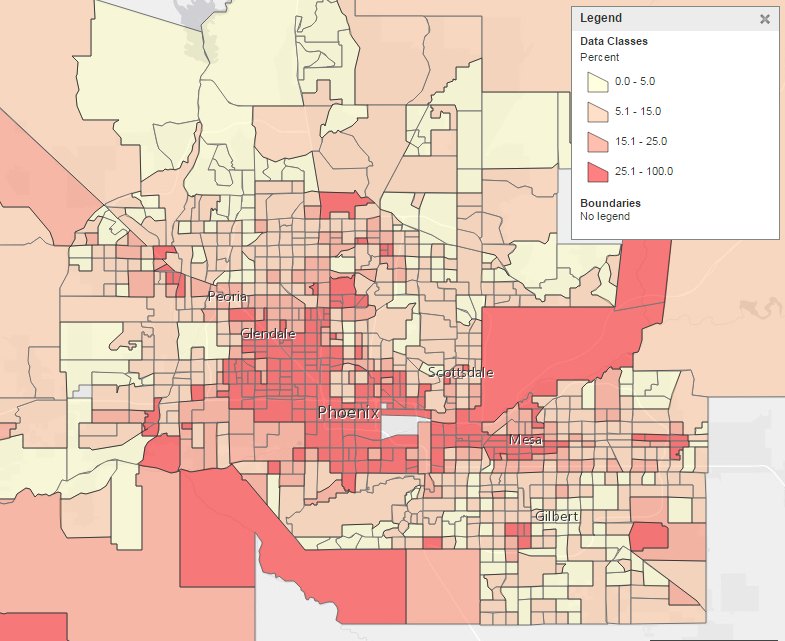
Percentage of people living in poverty across metro Phoenix in 2016; the darker the red, the higher the concentration of poverty

Historical population
Census	Pop.	Note	%±
1880	5,689		—
1890	10,986		93.1%
1900	20,457		86.2%
1910	34,488		68.6%
1920	89,576		159.7%
1930	150,970		68.5%
1940	186,193		23.3%
1950	331,770		78.2%
1960	663,510		100.0%
1970	971,228		46.4%
1980	1,509,175		55.4%
1990	2,122,101		40.6%
2000	3,072,149		44.8%
2010	3,817,117		24.2%
2020	4,420,568		15.8%
2025 (est.)	4,689,558		6.1%
U.S. Decennial Census; 1790–1960 1900–1990; 1990–2000 2010–2020

=== Racial and ethnic composition since 1960 ===
Racial composition	2020	2010	2000	1990	1980	1970	1960
White	59.8%	73.0%	77.3%	84.7%	86.6%	94.8%	94.5%
—Non-Hispanic	53.3%	58.7%	66.2%	77.1%	81.1%	-	-
Black or African American	5.8%	5.0%	3.7%	3.4%	3.1%	3.3%	3.7%
Hispanic or Latino (of any race)	30.6%	29.6%	24.8%	16.2%	13.1%	14.5%	-
Asian	4.6%	3.5%	2.1%	1.7%	-	-	0.3%
Native American	2.3%	2.1%	1.8%	1.7%	-	-	1.2%
Pacific Islander	0.2%	0.2%	0.1%	-	-	-	-
Mixed Race	13.6%	2.4%	2.9%	-	-	-	-

=== 2020 census ===
As of the 2020 census, the county had a population of 4,420,568. Of the residents, 23.5% were under the age of 18 and 16.1% were 65 years of age or older; the median age was 37.2 years. For every 100 females there were 97.1 males, and for every 100 females age 18 and over there were 94.9 males. 97.7% of residents lived in urban areas and 2.3% lived in rural areas.

The racial makeup of the county was 59.8% White, 5.9% Black or African American, 2.3% American Indian and Alaska Native, 4.6% Asian, 0.2% Native Hawaiian and Pacific Islander, 13.5% from some other race, and 13.6% from two or more races. Hispanic or Latino residents of any race comprised 30.6% of the population.

There were 1,643,579 households in the county, of which 31.5% had children under the age of 18 living with them and 26.2% had a female householder with no spouse or partner present. About 25.5% of all households were made up of individuals and 9.8% had someone living alone who was 65 years of age or older.

There were 1,812,827 housing units, of which 9.3% were vacant. Among occupied housing units, 63.0% were owner-occupied and 37.0% were renter-occupied. The homeowner vacancy rate was 1.6% and the rental vacancy rate was 8.4%.

Maricopa County, Arizona – Racial and ethnic composition Note: the US Census treats Hispanic/Latino as an ethnic category. This table excludes Latinos from the racial categories and assigns them to a separate category. Hispanics/Latinos may be of any race.
Race / Ethnicity (NH = Non-Hispanic)	Pop 2000	Pop 2010	Pop 2020	% 2000	% 2010	% 2020
White alone (NH)	2,034,530	2,240,055	2,357,571	66.22%	58.68%	53.33%
Black or African American alone (NH)	108,521	177,490	245,239	3.53%	4.65%	5.55%
Native American or Alaska Native alone (NH)	45,703	59,252	68,353	1.49%	1.55%	1.55%
Asian alone (NH)	64,562	128,301	197,910	2.10%	3.36%	4.48%
Native Hawaiian or Pacific Islander alone (NH)	3,725	6,723	9,579	0.12%	0.18%	0.22%
Other race alone (NH)	4,086	5,508	20,693	0.13%	0.14%	0.47%
Mixed race or Multiracial (NH)	47,681	71,047	169,808	1.55%	1.86%	3.84%
Hispanic or Latino (any race)	763,341	1,128,741	1,351,415	24.85%	29.57%	30.57%
Total	3,072,149	3,817,117	4,420,568	100.00%	100.00%	100.00%

=== American Community Survey 2025 data ===
The United States Census Bureau estimated that in 2025, Maricopa County’s population was 4.689.558. It was also estimated that the county's population was 50,82% Non-Hispanic White, 32,29% Hispanic or Latino, 6,12% Non-Hispanic Black, 5,36% Asian, 1,65% Native American, 0,23% Pacific Islander, and 3,52% Multiracial.

Total	Population	Percentage
Non-Hispanic White	2.383.357	50,82%
Hispanic or Latino	1.514.398	32,29%
Non-Hispanic Black	287.071	6,12%
Asian	251.397	5,36%
Native American	77.451	1,65%
Pacific Islander	10.961	0,23%
Non-Hispanic Multiracial	164.923	3,52%

=== 2010 census ===
As of the 2010 census, 3,817,117 people, 1,411,583 households, and 932,814 families were living in the county. The population density was 414.9/sq mi (160.2/km^{2}). The 1,639,279 housing units averaged 178.2/sq mi (68.8/km^{2}). The racial makeup of the county was 73.0% white (58.7% non-Hispanic white), 5.0% African American, 3.5% Asian, 2.1% American Indian, 0.2% Pacific islander, 12.8% from other races, and 3.5% from two or more races. Those of Hispanic or Latino origin made up 29.6% of the population. The largest ancestry groups were:

- 25.6% Mexican
- 16.2% German
- 10.6% Irish
- 9.7% English
- 5.2% American
- 5.1% Italian
- 3.5% Spaniards
- 2.8% Polish
- 2.8% French
- 2.0% Scottish
- 1.9% Norwegian
- 1.8% Swedish
- 1.6% Dutch
- 1.5% Scotch-Irish
- 1.0% Russian

Of the 1,411,583 households, 35.1% had children under 18 living with them, 47.8% were married couples living together, 12.4% had a female householder with no husband present, 33.9% were not families, and 25.9% of all households were made up of individuals. The average household size was 2.67 and the average family size was 3.25. The median age was 34.6 years.

The median income for a household in the county was $55,054 and the median income for a family was $65,438. Males had a median income of $45,799 versus $37,601 for females. The per capita income for the county was $27,816. About 10.0% of families and 13.9% of the population were below the poverty line, including 19.8% of those under age 18 and 7.0% of those age 65 or over.

According to data provided by the United States Census Bureau in October 2015 and collected from 2009 to 2013, 73.7% of the population aged five years and over spoke only English at home, while 20.3% spoke Spanish, 0.6% spoke Chinese, 0.5% Vietnamese, 0.4% Tagalog, 0.4% Arabic, 0.4% German, 0.3% French, 0.3% Navajo, 0.2% Korean, 0.2% Hindi, 0.2% Italian, 0.1% Persian, 0.1% Russian, 0.1% Serbo-Croatian, 0.1% Telugu, 0.1% Polish, 0.1% Syriac, 0.1% Japanese, 0.1% spoke Romanian, and 0.1% spoke other Native North American languages at home.

=== 2000 census ===
As of the census of 2000, 3,072,149 people, 1,132,886 households, and 763,565 families were living in the county. The population density was 334 people/mi^{2} (129 people/km^{2}). The 1,250,231 housing units averaged of 136 per square mile (53/km^{2}). The racial makeup of the county was 77.4% White, 3.7% African American, 1.9% Native American, 2.2% Asian, 12.0% from other races, and 2.9% from two or more races. About 29.5% of the population were Hispanics or Latinos of any race. About 19.1% reported speaking Spanish at home.

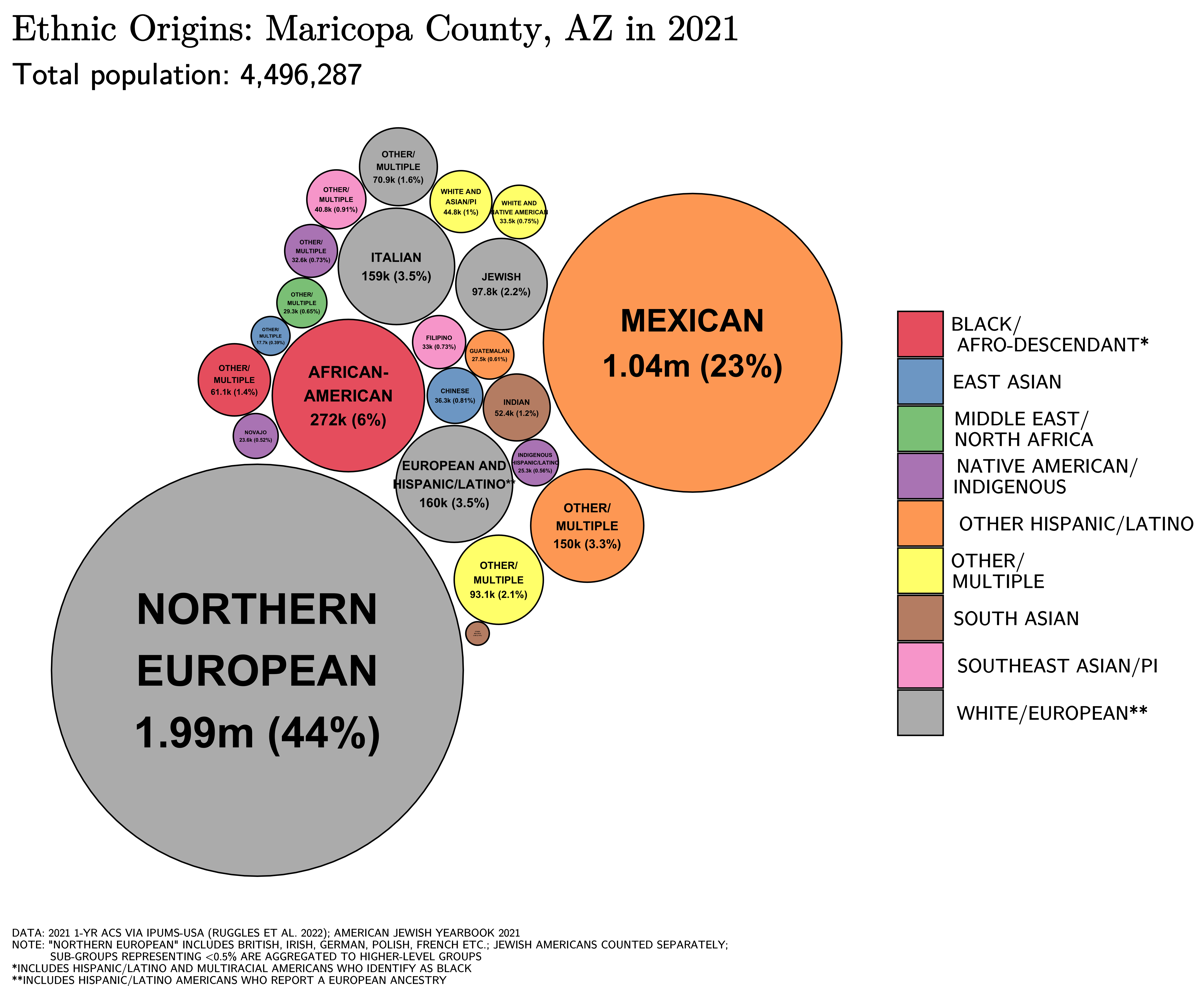
Ethnic origins in Maricopa County

Of the 1,132,886 households, 33.0% had children under 18 living with them, 51.6% were married couples living together, 10.7% had a female householder with no husband present, and 32.6% were not families. About 24.5% of all households were made up of individuals, and 7.9% had someone living alone who was 65 or older. The average household size was 2.67, and the average family size was 3.21.

The age distribution in the county was 27.0% under 18, 10.2% from 18 to 24, 31.4% from 25 to 44, 19.8% from 45 to 64, and 11.7% who were 65 or older. The median age was 33 years. For every 100 females, there were 100.10 males. For every 100 females age 18 and over, there were 98.10 males.

The median income for a household in the county was $45,358, and for a family was $51,827. Males had a median income of $36,858 versus $28,703 for females. The per capita income for the county was $22,251. About 8.0% of families and 11.7% of the population were below the poverty line, including 15.4% of those under age 18 and 7.4% of those age 65 or over.

=== Religion ===
In 2010 statistics, the largest religious group in Maricopa County were Catholics, who are organized under the Roman Catholic Diocese of Phoenix with 519,950 Catholics and 99 parishes, and 9 additional eastern rite Catholic parishes. This is followed by 242,732 LDS Mormons with 503 congregations, 213,640 non-denominational adherents with 309 congregations, 93,252 Assembly of God Pentecostals with 120 congregations, 73,207 Southern Baptists with 149 congregations, 35,804 Christian churches and churches of Christ Christians with 29 congregations, 30,014 Evangelical Lutherans with 47 congregations, 28,634 UMC Methodists with 55 congregations, 18,408 Missouri Synod Lutherans with 34 congregations, and 15,001 Presbyterians with 42 congregations. Altogether, 39.1% of the population was claimed as members by religious congregations, although members of historically African-American denominations were underrepresented due to incomplete information. In 2014, the county had 1,177 religious organizations, the fifth most out of all US counties.

== Government, policing, and politics ==
=== Government ===
The governing body of Maricopa County is its board of supervisors. The Maricopa County Board of Supervisors consists of five members chosen by popular vote within their own districts. As of 2025 the board consists of four Republicans and one Democrat. Each member serves a four-year term, with no term limits. The chairperson of the board presides for a one-year term, selected by the board members during a public hearing.

Unlike cities and towns in Arizona, counties are politically and legally subordinate to the state and do not have charters of their own. The county Board of Supervisors acts under powers delegated by state law, mainly related to minor ordinances and revenue collection. With few exceptions, these powers are narrowly construed. The state legislature retains considerable authority over local matters, and counties must seek legislative approval for the most basic local measures.

The county sheriff, county attorney, county assessor, county treasurer, superintendent of schools, county recorder, constables, justices of the peace, and clerk of the Superior Court are elected by the people. Retention of Superior Court judges is also determined by popular vote.

=== Maricopa County Sheriff ===
The Maricopa County Sheriff's Office provides court protection, administers the county jail, and patrols the unincorporated areas of the county plus incorporated towns by contract.

=== Politics ===
For much of the time after World War II, Maricopa County was one of the more conservative urban counties in the United States. While the city of Phoenix has historically leaned Republican, most of the rest of the county was more conservative. Until 2020, every Republican presidential candidate since 1952 had carried Maricopa County. This includes the 1964 presidential run of native son Barry Goldwater, who would not have carried his own state had it not been for a 21,000-vote margin in Maricopa County. Until 2020, it was the largest county in the country to vote Republican. From 1968 to 2016, Democrats held the margin within single digits only three times–in 1992, 1996, and 2016. In 2020, Joe Biden became the first Democrat in 72 years to win the county, which flipped Arizona to the Democratic column for the first time since 1996 and only the second time since 1948. Furthermore, Biden became the first presidential candidate to win more than one million votes in the county. This makes Maricopa County the third county in American history to cast more than one million votes for a presidential candidate. The county is also a statewide bellwether, voting for the statewide winning candidate in all elections except 1996. In 2024, however, Donald Trump was able to flip the county back as he carried Arizona in that election due to his increase in support among Hispanics in Phoenix and its suburbs.

Despite its consistent Republican allegiance since 1952, its fast-growing Hispanic population and influx of conservative retirees and Mormons, which were traditionally conservative voting blocs but were increasingly skeptical of President Donald Trump, signaled that it was a crucial bellwether in the 2020 election.

Voter Registration as of January 2026
Party	Number of voters	Percentage
Republican	896,064	35.3%
Other/Independents	888,733	35.0%
Democratic	706,649	27.8%
Arizona Independent Party	25,874	1.0%
Libertarian Party	18,298	0.7%
Green Party	2,873	0.1%
Total	2,538,491	100.00%

United States presidential election results for Maricopa County, Arizona
Year	Republican		Democratic		Third party(ies)	
Year	No.	%	No.	%	No.	%
1912	642	11.32%	2,606	45.97%	2,421	42.71%
1916	5,747	39.26%	7,634	52.14%	1,259	8.60%
1920	11,336	56.23%	8,825	43.77%	0	0.00%
1924	10,611	44.66%	9,177	38.63%	3,970	16.71%
1928	20,089	62.25%	12,146	37.64%	34	0.11%
1932	15,086	34.07%	28,601	64.59%	593	1.34%
1936	13,671	28.71%	32,031	67.28%	1,908	4.01%
1940	22,610	38.93%	35,055	60.36%	414	0.71%
1944	24,853	43.41%	32,197	56.23%	208	0.36%
1948	36,585	46.31%	40,498	51.27%	1,909	2.42%
1952	77,249	60.57%	50,285	39.43%	0	0.00%
1956	92,140	62.96%	54,010	36.91%	191	0.13%
1960	127,090	59.37%	86,834	40.57%	135	0.06%
1964	143,114	53.94%	122,042	46.00%	170	0.06%
1968	162,262	59.08%	86,204	31.39%	26,185	9.53%
1972	244,593	69.29%	95,135	26.95%	13,272	3.76%
1976	258,262	61.66%	144,613	34.53%	15,966	3.81%
1980	316,287	64.97%	119,752	24.60%	50,795	10.43%
1984	411,902	71.98%	154,833	27.06%	5,538	0.97%
1988	442,337	64.90%	230,952	33.89%	8,229	1.21%
1992	360,049	41.06%	285,457	32.56%	231,326	26.38%
1996	386,015	47.22%	363,991	44.53%	67,426	8.25%
2000	479,967	53.23%	386,683	42.88%	35,049	3.89%
2004	679,455	56.86%	504,849	42.25%	10,657	0.89%
2008	746,448	54.43%	602,166	43.91%	22,756	1.66%
2012	749,885	54.30%	602,288	43.61%	28,786	2.08%
2016	747,361	47.67%	702,907	44.83%	117,566	7.50%
2020	995,665	48.11%	1,040,774	50.29%	33,036	1.60%
2024	1,051,531	51.18%	980,016	47.70%	22,868	1.11%

Despite its political leanings at the time, Maricopa County voted against Proposition 107 in the 2006 election. This referendum, designed to ban gay marriage and restrict domestic partner benefits, was rejected by a 51.6–48.4% margin within the county, and statewide by a similar margin. Two years later, however, a majority of county residents voted to pass a more limited constitutional amendment Proposition 102 to ban same-sex marriage but not state-recognized civil unions or domestic partnerships. The amendment was later invalidated by the Supreme Court's 2015 ruling in Obergefell v. Hodges, which declared that same-sex marriage is a fundamental right in the United States.

The county's dominant political figure for over two decades (from 1993 to 2017) was Sheriff Joe Arpaio, who called himself "America's Toughest Sheriff" and gained national notoriety for his flamboyant and often controversial practices and policies.

Maricopa County is home to 62 percent of the state's population and therefore dominates Arizona's politics. For example, in the 2018 Senate election, Democrat Kyrsten Sinema carried the county en route to becoming the first Democrat to win a Senate seat in Arizona since 1988. She won the county by over 60,000 votes, more than enough for the victory; she won statewide by 55,900 votes. All but one of the state's nine congressional districts include part of the county, and five of the districts have their population center located there. Most of the state's prominent elected officials live in the county. Further underlining Maricopa County's political dominance, Biden's margin of 45,109 votes was more than enough to carry the state; he only won Arizona by 10,457 votes.

Conversely, in the 2024 general election, former president Donald Trump won Maricopa County by 71,515 votes and won the state of Arizona by 187,382 votes, making the 5.5 percent statewide victory the largest percentage win of any of the seven 2024 swing states.

=== Elected officials ===
==== United States Congress ====
District	Name	Party	First elected (Note: Due to redistricting in 2012, many of the Representatives listed were first elected to a different district.)	Area(s) represented
United States Senate
Class I Senator	Ruben Gallego	Democratic	2024	At Large
Class III Senator	Mark Kelly	Democratic	2020	At Large
United States House of Representatives
1	David Schweikert	Republican	2010	Fountain Hills, Mesa, Paradise Valley, Phoenix, Scottsdale
2	Eli Crane	Republican	2022	Gila River Indian Community
3	Yassamin Ansari	Democratic	2024	Glendale, Phoenix, Tempe
4	Greg Stanton	Democratic	2018	Chandler, Mesa, Phoenix, Tempe
5	Andy Biggs	Republican	2016	Chandler, Gilbert, Mesa, Queen Creek
7	Adelita Grijalva	Democratic	2025	Avondale, Gila Bend, Goodyear, Tolleson
8	Abraham Hamadeh	Republican	2024	Glendale, Peoria, Phoenix, Surprise
9	Paul Gosar	Republican	2010	Buckeye, El Mirage, Glendale, Goodyear, Litchfield Park, Surprise

The 1st, 3rd, 4th, 5th and 8th districts are all centered in Maricopa County; all but the 5th contains part of Phoenix. The 2nd and 9th are centered in rural Arizona, while the 7th is primarily Tucson-based.

==== Elected county officials ====
Party	Office	Name	First elected	Reference
Republican	Assessor	Eddie Cook	2020†	
Republican	Clerk of the Superior Court	Joseph W. Malka	2025†	
Republican	County Attorney	Rachel Mitchell	2022†	
Republican	County Recorder	Justin Heap	2024	
Republican	County School Superintendent	Shelli Boggs	2024	
Republican	Sheriff	Jerry Sheridan	2024	
Republican	Treasurer	John Allen	2020	

†Member was originally appointed to the office.

== Education ==
- Maricopa County Library District operates the county libraries in Maricopa County.
- The Maricopa County School Superintendent is charged with the general conduct and supervision of the public school system in Maricopa County. The superintendent is one of six county-wide elected officials, elected by the voters of Maricopa County every four years. Since the inception of the office, there have been thirteen Maricopa County School Superintendents. The incumbent, Steve Watson, took office January 1, 2017.

=== K-12 schools ===
School districts with territory in the county (no matter how slight, even if the administration and schools are in other counties) include:

Unified:

- Cave Creek Unified School District
- Chandler Unified School District
- Deer Valley Unified District
- Dysart Unified School District
- Fountain Hills Unified School District
- Gila Bend Unified School District
- Gilbert Unified School District
- Higley Unified School District
- Mesa Unified School District
- Nadaburg Unified School District
- Paradise Valley Unified School District
- Peoria Unified School District
- Queen Creek Unified School District
- Saddle Mountain Unified School District
- Scottsdale Unified School District
- Wickenburg Unified School District

Secondary:

- Agua Fria Union High School District
- Buckeye Union High School District
- Glendale Union High School District
- Phoenix Union High School District
- Tempe Union High School District
- Tolleson Union High School District

Elementary:

- Aguila Elementary School District
- Alhambra Elementary School District
- Avondale Elementary School District
- Balsz Elementary School District
- Buckeye Elementary School District
- Cartwright Elementary School District
- Creighton Elementary School District
- Fowler Elementary School District
- Glendale Elementary School District
- Isaac Elementary School District
- Kyrene Elementary School District
- Laveen Elementary School District
- Liberty Elementary School District
- Litchfield Elementary School District
- Littleton Elementary School District
- Madison Elementary School District
- Mobile Elementary School District
- Morristown Elementary School District
- Murphy Elementary School District
- Osborn Elementary School District
- Palo Verde Elementary School District
- Paloma School District
- Pendergast Elementary School District
- Phoenix Elementary School District
- Riverside Elementary School District
- Roosevelt Elementary School District
- Sentinel Elementary School District
- Tempe School District
- Tolleson Elementary School District
- Union Elementary School District
- Washington Elementary School District
- Wilson Elementary School District

There is also a state-operated school, Phoenix Day School for the Deaf.

The Phoenix Indian School was formerly in the county.

== Transportation ==
=== Major highways ===
- Interstate 8
- Interstate 10
- Interstate 17
- U.S. Route 60
- Historic U.S. Route 80
- U.S. Route 93
- Loop 101
- Loop 202
- Loop 303
- State Route 24
- State Route 51
- State Route 71
- State Route 74
- State Route 85
- State Route 87
- State Route 88
- State Route 143
- State Route 188
- State Route 238
- State Route 347

=== Air ===
The major primary commercial airport of the county is Phoenix Sky Harbor International Airport (PHX).

Other airports located in the county include:

- Phoenix-Mesa Gateway Airport in Mesa (AZA)
- Scottsdale Municipal Airport in Scottsdale (SCF)
- Deer Valley Airport in Deer Valley Village in Phoenix (DVT)
- Chandler Municipal Airport in Chandler (CHD)
- Phoenix Goodyear Airport in Goodyear (GYR)
- Glendale Municipal Airport in Glendale (GEU)
- Buckeye Municipal Airport in Buckeye (BXK)
- Falcon Field in Mesa (MSC)
- Gila Bend Municipal Airport in Gila Bend (E63)
- Wickenburg Municipal Airport in Wickenburg (E25)

=== Rail ===
In terms of freight rail, the Union Pacific Railroad and the Burlington Northern Santa Fe Railroad serve the county.

In terms of passenger rail, greater Phoenix is served by a light rail system. The county has no other passenger rail transport as Amtrak's Sunset Limited, which served Phoenix until June 2, 1996, has its closest stop in Maricopa in neighboring Pinal County. The train connects Maricopa to Tucson, Los Angeles, and New Orleans three times a week. However, it does not stop in Phoenix itself.

== Communities ==
=== Cities ===
- Apache Junction (mostly in Pinal County)
- Avondale
- Buckeye
- Chandler
- El Mirage
- Glendale
- Goodyear
- Litchfield Park
- Mesa
- Peoria (partly in Yavapai County)
- Phoenix (county seat)
- Scottsdale
- Surprise
- Tempe
- Tolleson

=== Towns ===
- Carefree
- Cave Creek
- Fountain Hills
- Gila Bend
- Gilbert
- Guadalupe
- Paradise Valley
- Queen Creek (partly in Pinal County)
- Wickenburg (partly in Yavapai County)
- Youngtown

=== Census-designated places ===
- Aguila
- Anthem
- Arlington
- Circle City
- Citrus Park
- Gila Crossing
- Kaka
- Komatke
- Maricopa Colony
- Morristown
- New River
- Rio Verde
- St. Johns
- Sun City
- Sun City West
- Sun Lakes
- Theba
- Tonopah
- Wintersburg
- Wittmann

=== Unincorporated communities ===
- Chandler Heights
- Co-op Village
- Desert Hills
- Fort McDowell
- Higley
- Laveen
- Liberty
- Mobile
- Palo Verde
- Rainbow Valley
- Sunflower
- Tortilla Flat
- Waddell

=== Ghost towns ===
- Agua Caliente
- Alma
- Angel Camp
- Marinette
- Vulture City

=== Native American communities ===
- Fort McDowell Yavapai Nation
- Gila River Indian Community
- Salt River Pima–Maricopa Indian Community
- Tohono O'odham Indian Reservation

=== County population ranking ===
The population ranking of the following table is based on the 2020 census of Maricopa County.

† county seat

Rank	City/Town/etc.	Population (2020 Census)	Population (2024 Estimate)	Municipal type	Incorporated
1	Phoenix †	1,608,139	1,673,164	City	1881
2	Mesa	504,258	517,151	City	1878 (founded)
3	Chandler	275,987	281,231	City	1920
4	Gilbert	267,918	288,790	Town	1920
5	Glendale	248,325	258,143	City	1910
6	Scottsdale	241,361	246,170	City	1951
7	Peoria (partially in Yavapai County)	190,985	199,924	City	1954
8	Tempe	180,587	190,114	City	1894
9	Surprise	143,148	167,564	City	1960
10	Goodyear	95,294	118,186	City	1946
11	Buckeye	91,502	114,334	City	1929
12	Avondale	89,334	96,609	City	1946
13	Queen Creek (partially in Pinal County)	59,519	83,781	Town	1990
14	Sun City	39,931	--	CDP	
15	El Mirage	35,805	36,468	City	1951
16	Sun City West	25,806	--	CDP	
17	Fountain Hills	23,820	23,696	Town	1989
18	Anthem	23,190	--	CDP	
19	New River	17,290	--	CDP	
20	Sun Lakes	14,868	--	CDP	
21	Paradise Valley	12,658	12,523	Town	1961
22	Wickenburg (partially in Yavapai County)	7,474	8,301	Town	1909
23	Tolleson	7,216	9,353	City	1929
24	Youngtown	7,056	7,062	Town	1960
25	Litchfield Park	6,847	6,863	City	1987
26	Guadalupe	5,322	5,197	Town	1975
27	Citrus Park	5,194	--	CDP	
28	Cave Creek	4,892	5,177	Town	1986
29	Carefree	3,690	3,657	Town	1984
30	Rio Verde	2,210	--	CDP	
31	Gila Bend	1,892	1,847	Town	1962
32	Komatke	1,013	--	CDP	
33	Maricopa Colony	854	--	CDP	
34	St. Johns	690	--	CDP	
35	Wittmann	684	--	CDP	
36	Gila Crossing	636	--	CDP	
37	Aguila	565	--	CDP	
38	Morristown	186	--	CDP	
39	Arlington	150	--	CDP	
40	Theba	111	--	CDP	
41	Kaka	83	--	CDP	
42	Wintersburg	51	--	CDP	
43	Tonopah	23	--	CDP	

== Climate ==
Maricopa County

Climate chart (precipitation, max. and min. temperature)
J	F	M	A	M	J	J	A	S	O	N	D
7 19 5	6 23 6	18 31 9	3 40 14	3 49 20	1 45 24	29 47 28	39 45 27	46 48 24	4 40 15	15 29 8	21 19 2
- █ Average max. and min. temperatures in °C
- █ Precipitation totals in mm
Imperial conversion
J	F	M	A	M	J	J	A	S	O	N	D
0.3 66 41	0.2 73 43	0.7 88 48	0.1 104 57	0.1 120 68	0 113 75	1.1 117 82	1.5 113 81	1.8 118 75	0.2 104 59	0.6 84 46	0.8 66 36
- █ Average max. and min. temperatures in °F
- █ Precipitation totals in inches

== Economy ==
In 2019, the largest employers in Maricopa County were:

#	Employer	# of employees
1	Banner Health	27,650
2	State of Arizona	23,950
3	Walmart	16,870
4	Frys Food Stores	15,170
5	Wells Fargo	13,790
6	Maricopa County	13,350
7	City of Phoenix	12,190
8	Intel Corporation	11,410
9	Arizona State University	10,950
10	HonorHealth	9,430
11	JPMorgan Chase Bank National Association	9,310
12	Bank of America	9,180
13	Dignity Health	9,100
14	Amazon	9,050
15	Mesa Unified School District 4	8,500
16	Honeywell	8,450
17	United States Department of the Air Force	7,720
18	Home Depot	7,420
19	State Farm Insurance	7,420
20	United States Postal Service	7,260

According to the Bureau of Economic Analysis, in 2019 the employment of Maricopa County in the following sectors was:

Sector	Number of jobs	Percent	National percent
Health care and social assistance	312,385	11.2%	11.3%
Retail trade	271,802	9.8%	9.4%
Administrative and support and waste management and remediation services	249,786	9.0%	6.2%
Finance and insurance	226,934	8.2%	5.4%
Accommodation and food services	204,917	7.4%	7.5%
Professional, scientific, and technical services	200,508	7.2%	7.2%
Construction	172,119	6.2%	5.5%
Real estate and rental and leasing	169,363	6.1%	4.8%
Local government	152,939	5.5%	7.1%
Other services (except government)	140,788	5.1%	5.8%
Manufacturing	137,444	4.9%	6.7%
Transportation and warehousing	134,151	4.8%	4.5%
Wholesale trade	91,114	3.3%	3.2%
Arts, entertainment, and recreation	64,117	2.3%	2.4%
Educational services	63,445	2.3%	2.4%
State government	49,051	1.8%	2.7%
Information	48,195	1.7%	1.7%
Management of companies and enterprises	35,917	1.7%	1.4%
Federal civilian	21,366	0.8%	1.4%
Military	14,632	0.5%	1.0%
Utilities	8,229	0.3%	0.3%
Farming	6,237	0.2%	1.3%
Mining, quarrying, and oil and gas extraction	5,356	0.2%	0.6%
Forestry, fishing, and related activities	2,994	0.1%	0.5%
Total	2,783,679	100%	100%

Maricopa produces Brassica, cabbage, collards, and mustard greens, and far more eggplant and greenhouse production of tomato. Kale is grown here than Yavapai, and Yuma for broccoli, cauliflower, and spinach, and to Yavapai for field tomato. The county's parsley and is tied with Pima for other fresh herbs. Some of the state's melon, okra, and bell pepper are also grown here.

Almost all the apricot, freestone peach, persimmon, and nectarine in the state are grown here. The county also ties for the highest amount of cling peach with Cochise, along with Pima produces almost all the pomegranate, and grows most of the kumquat. Maricopa's farms grow a middling amount of fig, grape (Vitis spp. including V. vinifera), and pear (Pyrus spp.) other than Bartlett. A small amount of plum is also produced here.

All of the boysenberry, half of the elderberry (along with Yavapai), and a small amount of the state's blackberry and strawberry are harvested here.

A large part of the vegetable seed in Arizona is grown here.

== See also ==
- 2021 Maricopa County presidential ballot audit
- History of Phoenix, Arizona
- Maricopa County Sheriff's Office
- Maricopa Trail
- National Register of Historic Places listings in Maricopa County, Arizona
- USS Maricopa County (LST-938)
- White Tank Mountain Regional Park
