= Jay Morago =

American activist (1917–2008)

Jay R. Morago Jr. (June 17, 1917 – May 14, 2008) was an activist of the Gila River Indian Community and was elected as their first governor. He helped to draft the reservation's first constitution in 1960. Morago served as the governor of the Gila River Indian Community from 1954 until 1960.

Jay Morago was born in Sacaton, Arizona, to parents Jay R. and Florence Morago on June 17, 1917. He attended Arizona State College, now Arizona State University.

During World War II, Morago served as a sergeant in the 158th Bushmasters Regiment of the Arizona National Guard. He saw active duty in the Pacific Ocean theater of World War II in Noemfoor, Indonesia; Philippines, Dutch East Indies, and New Guinea campaigns during the war. Morago was awarded four Bronze Stars and a Purple Heart for his service and being wounded on active duty. He remained active in veterans' affairs for the rest of his life, becoming a member of the Veterans of Foreign Wars chapter in Coolidge, Arizona, and the Ira Hayes American Legion Post in Sacaton.

Morago was elected as the first Governor of the Gila River Indian Community in 1954. He held the governorship of the reservation, which includes members of both the Akimel O'odham and Maricopa tribes, until 1960. During the 1950s, Morago led an effort to secure water rights for the Gila River Indian Community from the state and federal governments, which had gradually appropriated them over the years. He also helped to establish and draft the 1960 constitution for the Gila River Indian Community. Additionally, Morago served on the Gila River Farm Board.

Morago remained active in the Gila River Indian Community after leaving office. He worked professionally as a water master for the United States federal government until his retirement. In that position, he managed irrigation and water allotments.

Jay Morago died at the age of 90 at the Veterans Affairs Hospital in Phoenix, Arizona, on May 14, 2008, after a long struggle with cancer. His funeral was held at the St. Anthony Catholic Mission in Sacaton, the capital of the Gila River Indian Community. He was buried at the St. Anne Cemetery in Santan, Arizona. Morago's wife was Mary Catherine Morago. He was survived by two sisters, seven daughters, three sons, nineteen grandchildren, and ten great-grandchildren.
