= Wittmann, Arizona =

CDP in Maricopa County, Arizona

- Census-designated place
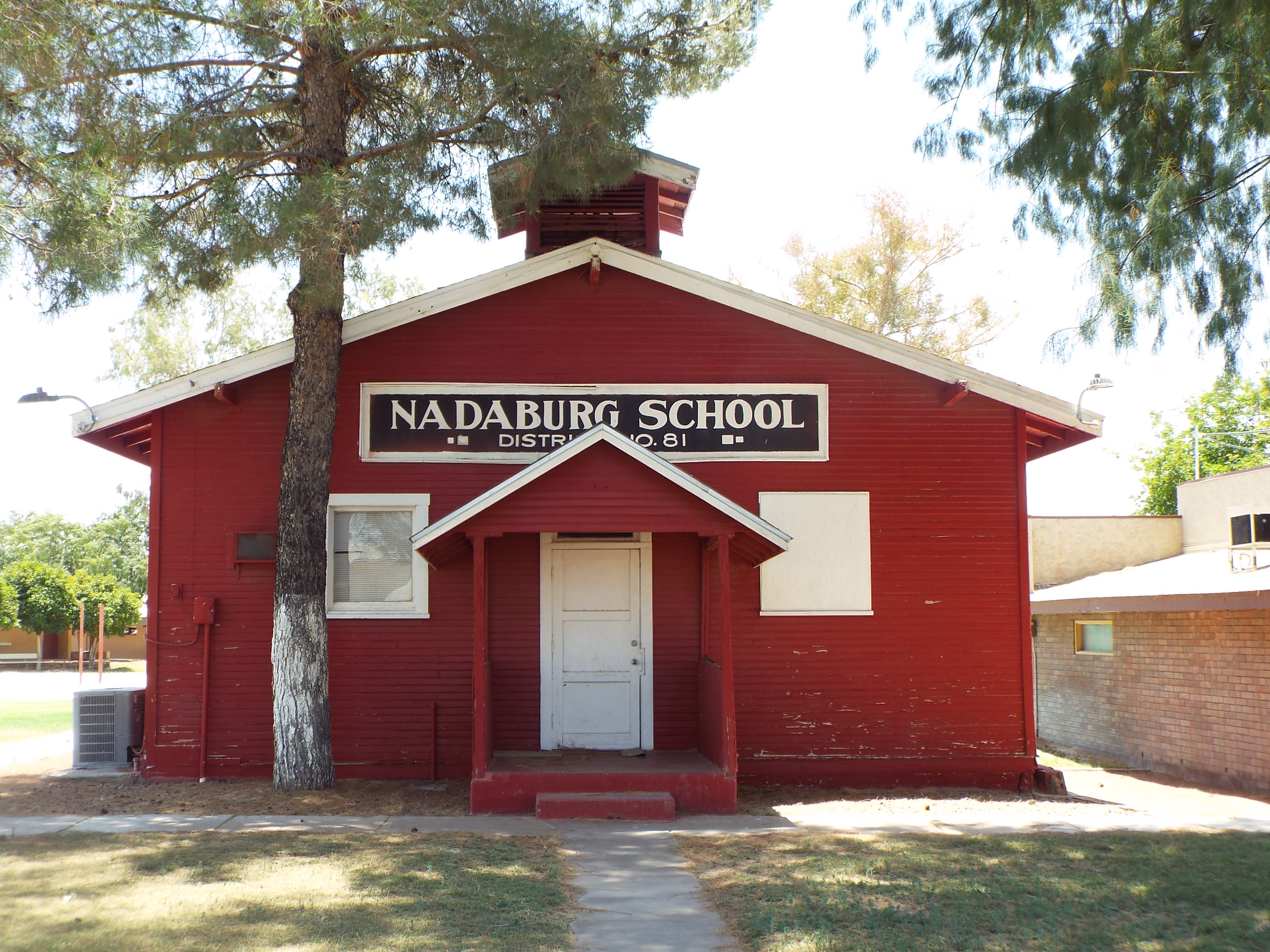
- Nadaburg School House

- Location in Maricopa County, Arizona

- Location within Arizona Location within the United States
- Coordinates: 33°46′30″N 112°31′30″W
- Country: United States
- State: Arizona
- County: Maricopa

Area
  - Total: 0.97 sq mi (2.50 km^{2})
  - Land: 0.97 sq mi (2.50 km^{2})
  - Water: 0 sq mi (0.00 km^{2})
- Elevation: 1,683 ft (513 m)

Population (2020)
  - Total: 684
  - Density: 709.0/sq mi (273.76/km^{2})
- Time zone: UTC-7 (Mountain (MST))
- ZIP code: 85361
- Area code: 623
- FIPS code: 04-84140
- GNIS feature ID: 2582909

Wittmann is an unincorporated community and census-designated place (CDP) in Maricopa County, Arizona, United States. As of the 2020 census, it had a population of 684, down from 763 in 2010. It is located along U.S. Route 60 in the central part of Arizona, 35 miles (56 km) northwest of central Phoenix, and is part of the Phoenix metropolitan area, although just outside the urban portion.

A variant name was "Nadaburg"; the present name is for Joseph Wittmann and his wife Eleanor van Beuren Wittmann, a couple who attempted several times to get approvals to build a dam project in nearby Box Canyon that would have benefitted the town. This was to be a successor to the poorly engineered Walnut Grove dam that had collapsed in February 1890, less than two years after it had filled. Eleanor van Beuren's father was the nominal head of a group of East Coast investors that had funded what was then primarily a placer mining project. One of the Walnut Grove Water Storage Company's engineers (not responsible for the design) was Lieutenant Colonel Alexander Oswald Brodie, who was later appointed Arizona's territorial governor.

Governmental approval and adequate funding lacking, the replacement dam project plans faltered. A long-projected time for repayment of supplemental government funding killed Joseph Wittmann's project in the 1940s, leaving promises to Maricopa County families broken.

The naming of nearby Morristown also refers to the Wittmann and van Beuren families, for they had residences in Morristown, New Jersey.

== History ==
The town was first named "Nadaburg", which is a combination of two words, the Spanish word "Nada", which means "nothing" and the German word "burg", which means "castle". R.E. Wells of the Southern Transcontinental Railroad named the site Nadaburg when a railroad switch was installed in the area years before it was formally opened to homesteading as a result of the Department of Interior Act of December 29, 1916.

William Hovey Griffin, a native of Texas, founded the town of Nadaburg (Wittmann). He filed his homestead petition in September 1920. That same year he also plotted out the town site. Griffin donated a block of land to the Maricopa County School District where the little Red School House (it was white at that time) was built. The school currently serves as the Nadaburg Unified School District Governing Board's Boardroom. In 1925, Griffin applied to the state corporation commission explaining the necessity of a water utility and requesting a permit to construct one in the town. Up to that point, Griffin had been providing water for about 20 families in the area from his original well that he drilled upon his arrival in 1920.

Joseph Wittmann, continuing a legacy initiated by his father-in-law, endeavored to build a dam on the Hassayampa River, which would bring irrigation water to the town of Nadaburg. In 1926, lots and acreage were given to Wittmann, by the citizens of Nadaburg, in support of the construction of the dam. In 1929, the people of Nadaburg changed the name of the town to Wittmann, honoring the family who promised them the water reserves and canals that would irrigate their fields. Hydroelectric dams to were also promised to bring power the community and others nearby. Other land and claims included those that had belonged to the Wittmann-van Beuren family ever since the Walnut Grove Water Storage Company went into receivership in the 1890s. However, unable and/or ill-equipped to keep his family's promise, Joseph Wittmann and his son Joseph Jr. were sued by the citizens of the town; at least half of them were able to recover their lands.

The town's economy is largely rooted in agriculture with the town's fertile soil. In the 1930s, the town widely grew dates, citrus, grapes, alfalfa, lettuce and cantaloupes. There have also been numerous livestock farms and dairies.

== Demographics ==
Historical population
Census	Pop.	Note	%±
2010	763		—
2020	684		−10.4%
U.S. Decennial Census

As of the census of 2010, there were 763 people living in the Wittmann census-designated place. The population density was 56.3 people per square mile. The racial makeup of Wittmann was 83.8% White, 0.8% Black or African American, 1.2% Native American, 0.5% Asian, 0.1% Pacific Islander, 10.6% from other races, and 3.0% from two or more races. 24.0% of the population were Hispanic or Latino of any race.

== Climate ==
According to the Köppen Climate Classification system, Wittmann has a hot desert climate, abbreviated "BWh" on climate maps. The hottest temperature recorded in Wittmann was 119 °F (48.3 °C) on June 28, 2013, and June 20, 2017, while the coldest temperature recorded was 12 °F (−11.1 °C) on January 13, 1963.

Climate data for Wittmann, Arizona, 1991–2020 normals, extremes 1930–2020
Month	Jan	Feb	Mar	Apr	May	Jun	Jul	Aug	Sep	Oct	Nov	Dec	Year
Record high °F (°C)	84 (29)	90 (32)	98 (37)	104 (40)	112 (44)	119 (48)	117 (47)	115 (46)	113 (45)	103 (39)	91 (33)	83 (28)	119 (48)
Mean daily maximum °F (°C)	65.2 (18.4)	68.2 (20.1)	74.9 (23.8)	82.1 (27.8)	91.8 (33.2)	101.8 (38.8)	104.6 (40.3)	103.3 (39.6)	97.6 (36.4)	86.5 (30.3)	74.1 (23.4)	64.1 (17.8)	84.5 (29.2)
Daily mean °F (°C)	52.2 (11.2)	54.8 (12.7)	60.3 (15.7)	66.3 (19.1)	75.9 (24.4)	85.5 (29.7)	90.7 (32.6)	90.1 (32.3)	83.7 (28.7)	71.8 (22.1)	59.9 (15.5)	51.5 (10.8)	70.2 (21.2)
Mean daily minimum °F (°C)	39.2 (4.0)	41.4 (5.2)	45.6 (7.6)	50.6 (10.3)	59.9 (15.5)	69.1 (20.6)	76.8 (24.9)	76.9 (24.9)	69.8 (21.0)	57.1 (13.9)	45.8 (7.7)	39.0 (3.9)	55.9 (13.3)
Record low °F (°C)	12 (−11)	17 (−8)	25 (−4)	32 (0)	34 (1)	49 (9)	58 (14)	60 (16)	46 (8)	29 (−2)	23 (−5)	22 (−6)	12 (−11)
Average precipitation inches (mm)	1.38 (35)	1.45 (37)	1.00 (25)	0.45 (11)	0.09 (2.3)	0.07 (1.8)	0.89 (23)	1.13 (29)	1.06 (27)	0.66 (17)	0.67 (17)	0.95 (24)	9.60 (244)
Average precipitation days (≥ 0.01 in)	3.9	4.2	2.5	1.4	0.8	0.3	5.2	4.9	3.4	2.3	2.3	4.3	35.5
Source 1: NOAA
Source 2: National Weather Service

== Economy ==
The town is located on the BNSF Phoenix Subdivision. BNSF has been in development of a project called Logistics Park Phoenix since 2022. BNSF purchased land around Wittmann from the State of Arizona in an auction in March 2022. Even more land was purchased in January 2026. As of 2026, BNSF was in the process of planning and getting approval for a large intermodal/logistics center. There also had been discussion for possible annexation of the parcels to Surprise. The annexation effort was ended in June 2024.

Waymo buys Apple's abandoned self-driving car proving ground for $220M (in Wittmann, AZ)

== Education ==
It is in the Nadaburg Unified School District.

== Gallery ==
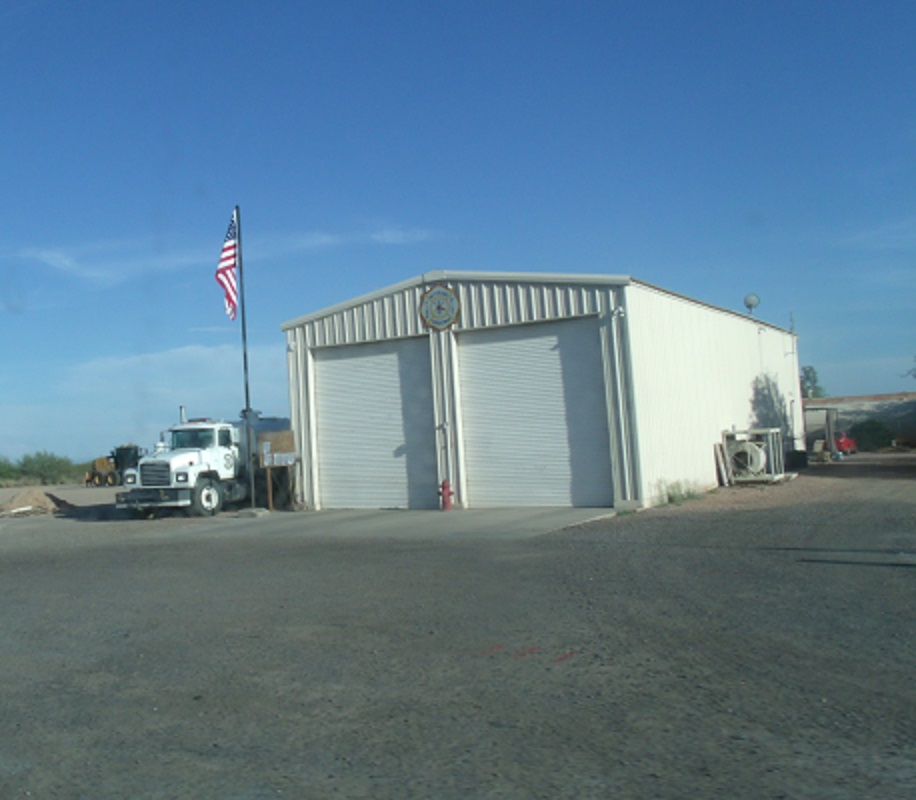
Wittmann Fire Station on Patton Road

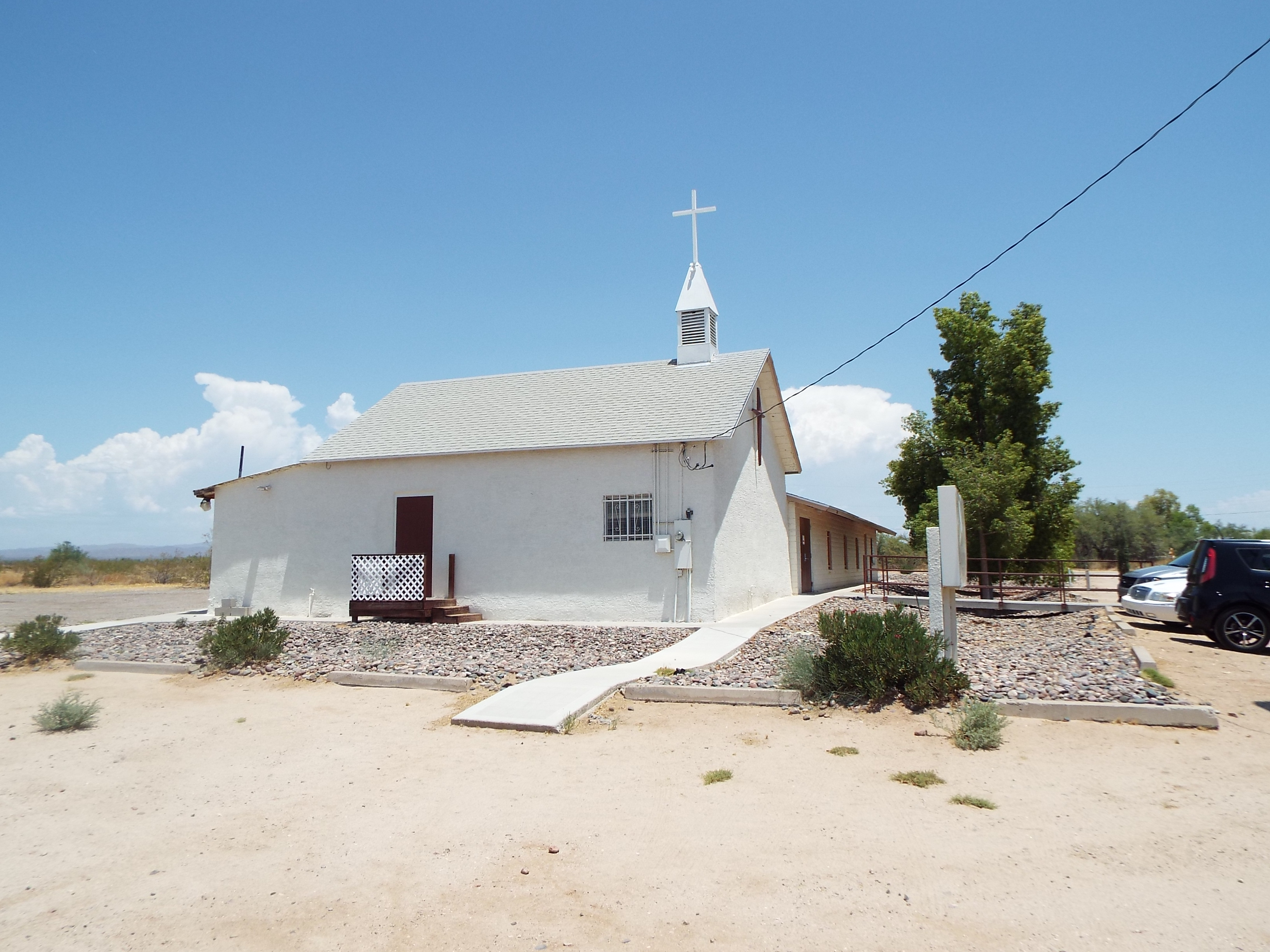
Early Nadaburg church, now the Assembly of God, built c. 1930, and located at 32858 Center Street.

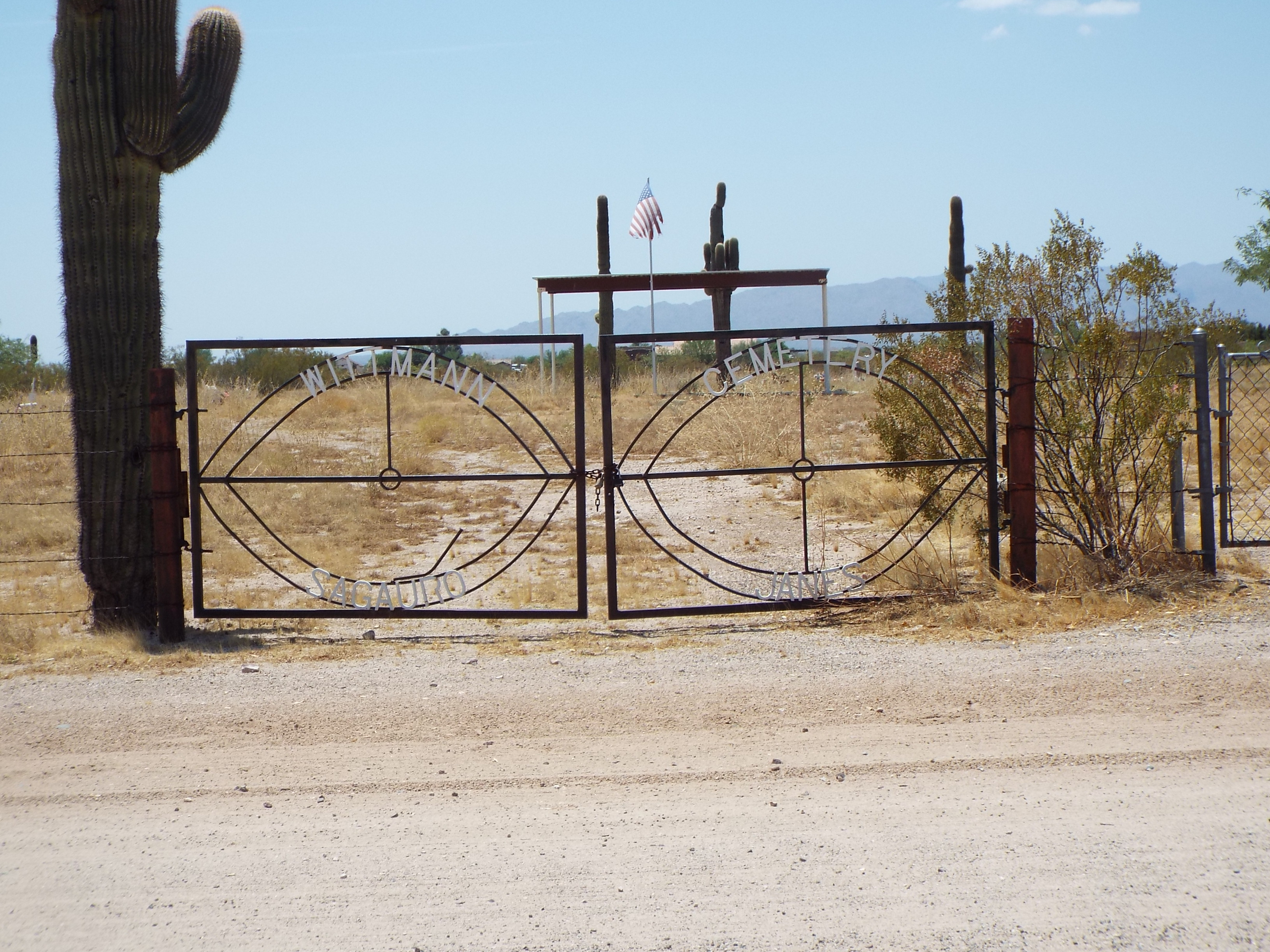
Wittmann Cemetery at 21307 Galvin Street. The first recorded burial was that of James Stalnaker in 1917.

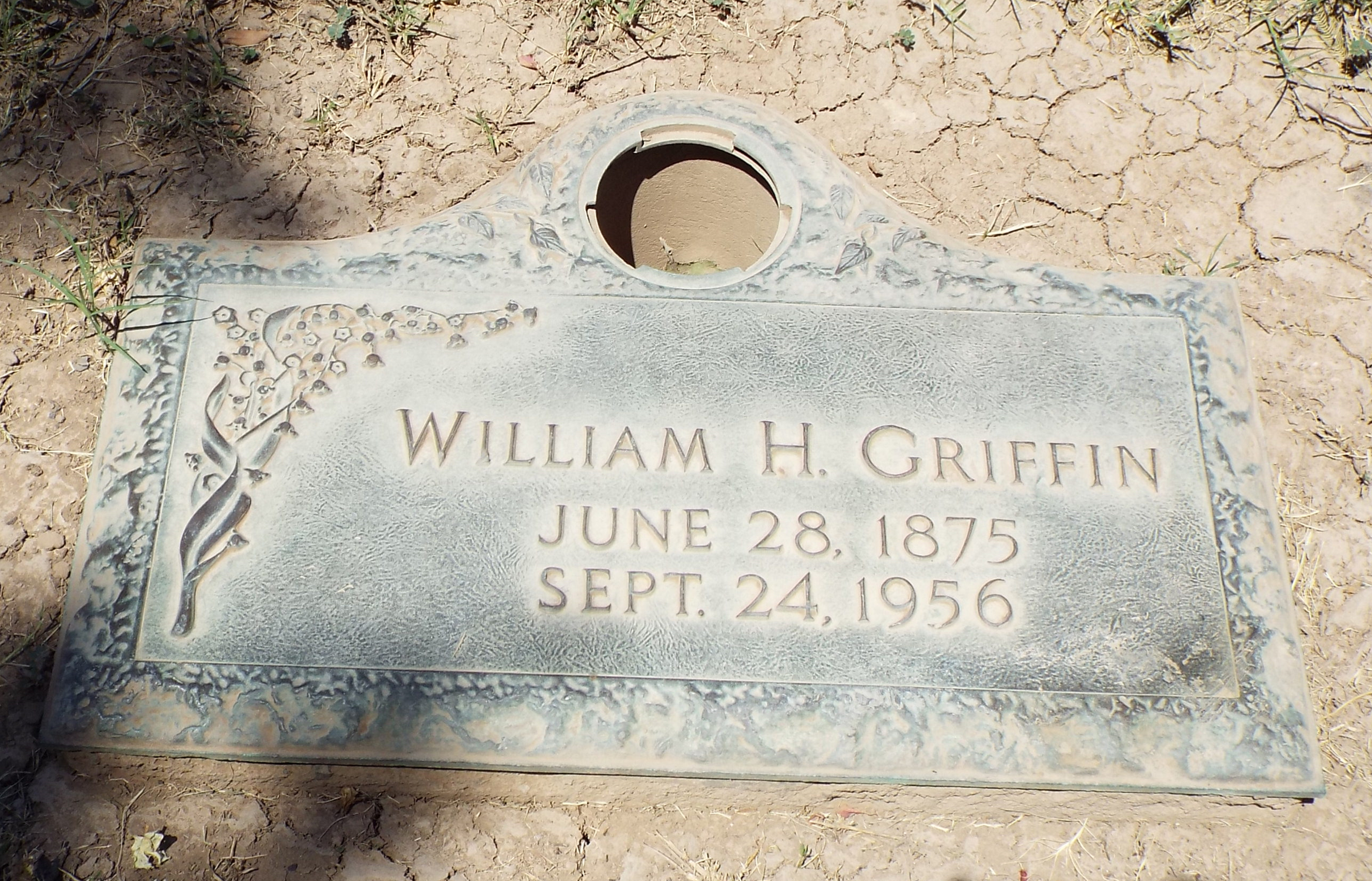
Grave of William Hovey Griffin (1875–1956) in West Resthaven Park Cemetery and Funeral Home, Glendale

== See also ==
- List of census-designated places in Arizona
