= Gila River Indian Community =

Federally recognized tribe in Arizona, US

Gila River Indian Community of the Gila River Indian Reservation Keli Akimel Oʼotham (O'odham) Piipaash (Maricopa)
- Indian reservation
- Location of Gila River Indian Community in northwestern Pinal County, Arizona. The Phoenix metropolitan area is located north of the reservation.
- Country: United States
- State: Arizona

Area
  - Total: 1,511.90 km^{2} (583.749 sq mi)

Population (2020)
  - Total: 14,260
- Website: gilariver.org

The Gila River Indian Community of the Gila River Indian Reservation is a federally recognized tribe of Native Americans. The tribe controls the Gila River Indian Reservation, a reservation in the U.S. state of Arizona, lying adjacent to the south side of the cities of Chandler and Phoenix, in the Phoenix Metropolitan Area in Pinal and Maricopa counties. The reservation was established in 1859, and the Gila River Indian Community (GRIC) was formally established by Congress in 1939. This tribe has citizens who belong to two ethnic groups, the Akimel O’odham and Maricopa (Maricopa language: Piipaash). The O'odham language name for the community is Keli Akimel Oʼotham, meaning "Gila River People".

The reservation has a land area of 583.749 square miles (1,511.90 km^{2}) and a 2020 Census population of 14,260. It is made up of seven districts along the Gila River and its largest communities are Sacaton, Komatke, Santan, and Blackwater. Tribal administrative offices and departments are located in Sacaton. The Community operates its own telecommunications company, electric utility, industrial park and healthcare clinic, and publishes a monthly newspaper. It has one of the highest rates of Type 2 diabetes in the world, around 50% of the population. The community voluntarily contributes to Type 2 diabetes research, having participated in many studies of the disease.

== Government ==
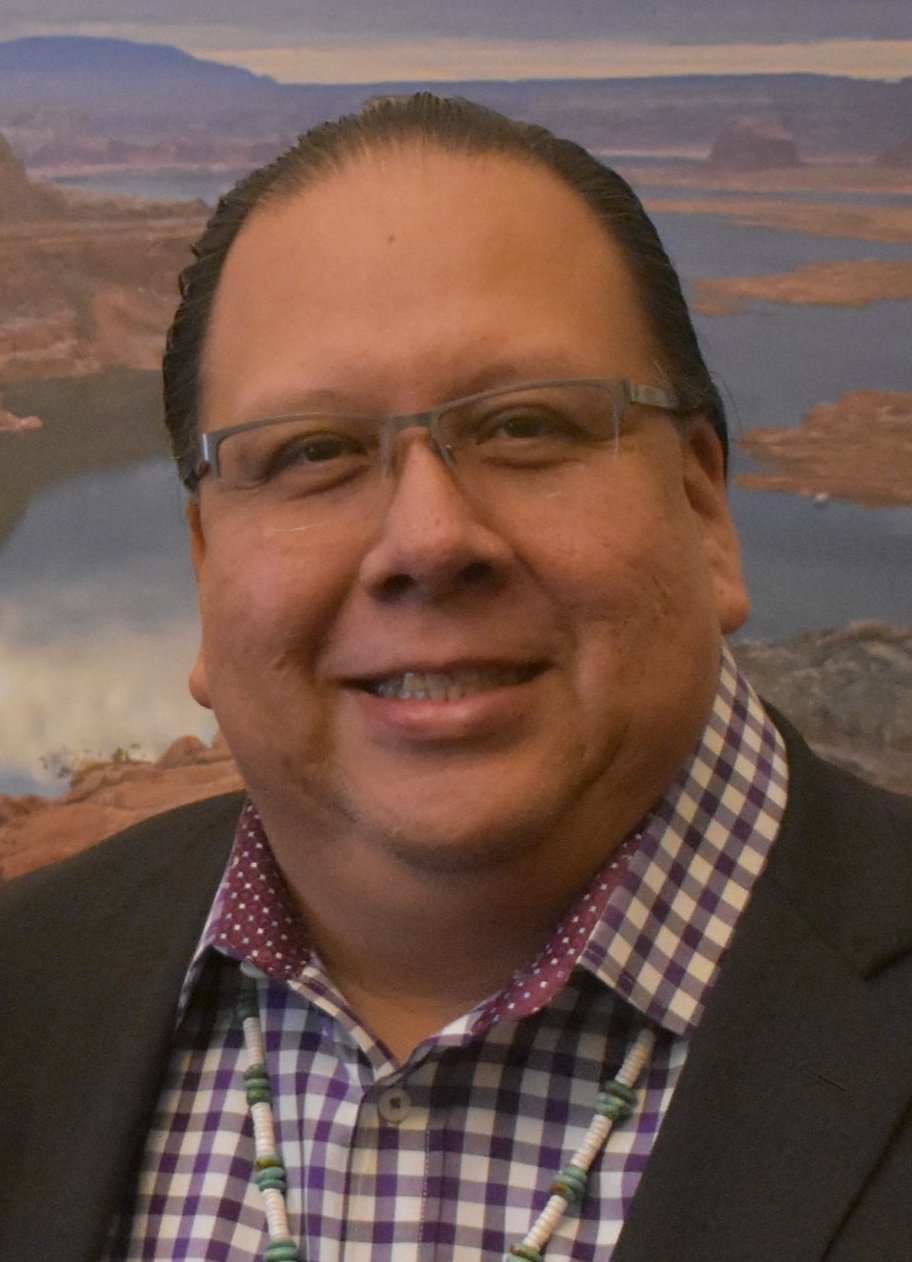
Governor Stephen Roe Lewis in 2019

Under their constitution, tribal citizens elect a governor and lieutenant governor at-large. They also elect 16 council members, from single-member districts or sub-districts with roughly equal populations.

As of 2025, the administration includes:

- Governor: Stephen Roe Lewis
- Lt. Governor: Regina Antone
- Council Member, District 1: Duane Jackson Jr.
- Council Member, District 1: Joey Whitman
- Council Member, District 2: Ann Lucas
- Council Member, District 3: Kristina D. Morago
- Council Member, District 3: Joseph Manuel Jr.
- Council Member, District 4: Nada Celeya
- Council Member, District 4: Leah Williams
- Council Member, District 4: Lalena Jackson
- Council Member, District 4: Jennifer Allison
- Council Member, District 5: Donovan G. Kyyitan
- Council Member, District 5: Franklin Pablo Sr.
- Council Member, District 5: Gordon Santos
- Council Member, District 5: James De La Rosa
- Council Member, District 6: Charles Goldtooth
- Council Member, District 6: Anthony Villareal Sr.
- Council Member, District 6: Terrance B. Evans
- Council Member, District 7: Jeanette Blasingim

== Economic development ==
The community has four casinos on the reservation that provide funding for the community. It provides gaming, entertainment, restaurants, and activities for people to enjoy:

- Vee Quiva Resort and Casino is located on the reservation in District 6, or Komatke, in Laveen, Arizona. It is a combination of both languages that are spoken on the reservation. Vee or Vii is derived from the Maricopa language, meaning rock or the old term for money. And Quiva means west in the O'odham language. Vee Quiva translates to Money/ Mountain to the West or West Mountain. It was the first casino to be built on the reservation in 1994.
- Wild Horse Pass Resort and Casino is located in District 6 on reservation in Chandler, Arizona. It is an AAA Four-Diamond Awarded hotel and has been voted as Number 9 Best Casino outside of Las Vegas.
- Lone Butte Casino is located in District 4 on the reservation in Chandler, Arizona.
- Santan Mountain Casino located in District 4 on the reservation in Chandler, Arizona. It hosts the largest casino sportsbook in the state.

Sheraton WildHorse Pass Resort & Spa is located in District 6 on the reservation in Chandler, Arizona. It is a resort that provides recreational, cultural, and educational experience for travelers.

Rawhide is located in District 6 on the reservation in Chandler, Arizona. It is a Western themed center where people can explore Wild West themed attractions. They host events throughout the year at their various 18 venues, including a multi-use soccer stadium.

Whirlwind Golf Club is located in District 6 on the reservation in Chandler, Arizona. It hosted the Ford Championship in March 2025, with Hyo Joo Kim winning the competition.

Toka Sticks Golf Club is located in Mesa, Arizona, owned by the community. Its name comes from a traditional O'odham women's game toka, in which there is a group of women holding a hockey-like stick made out of mesquite tree branch, and they play with a carved wooden puck called ola to get to the goal. It's akin to how modern hockey is played, but without the padding and cleats. It is believed the game was a gift from Elder Brother, O'odham creator I'itoi, for health and wellness.

Koli Equestrian Center Enterprise is a horseback riding place where people go on trails to explore the reservation's scenery.

Huhugam Heritage Center is the tribal historic museum that displays the communities' history, art, and important cultural artifacts.

Casa Grande Ruins National Monument, located just off the reservation boundary in Coolidge, is a federally protected park. About 100,000 visitors annually to see the ruins built by the Hohokam, O'odham language for 'those that have passed on'.

The Ira H. Hayes Memorial Library is located in District 3 in Sacaton, Arizona, and provides a variety of services to the community.

Sacaton Market opened for the community on October 23, 2025, providing groceries, gas, and a laundromat for use.

== Communities ==
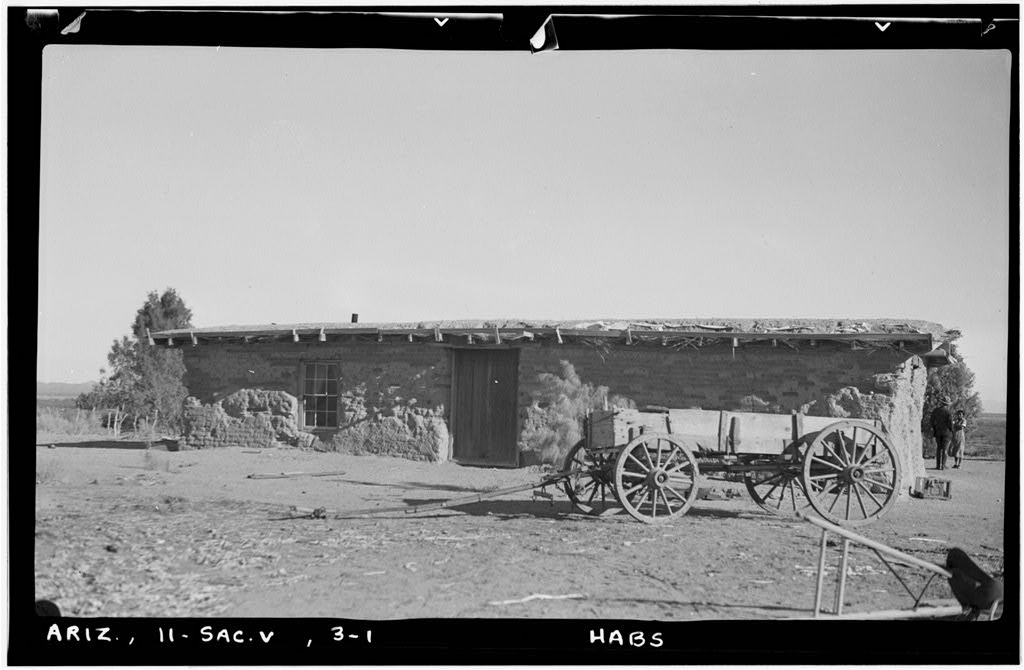
House with Bow Roof, Sacaton vicinity, Pinal County, AZ. Photo from Historic American Buildings Survey, 1938

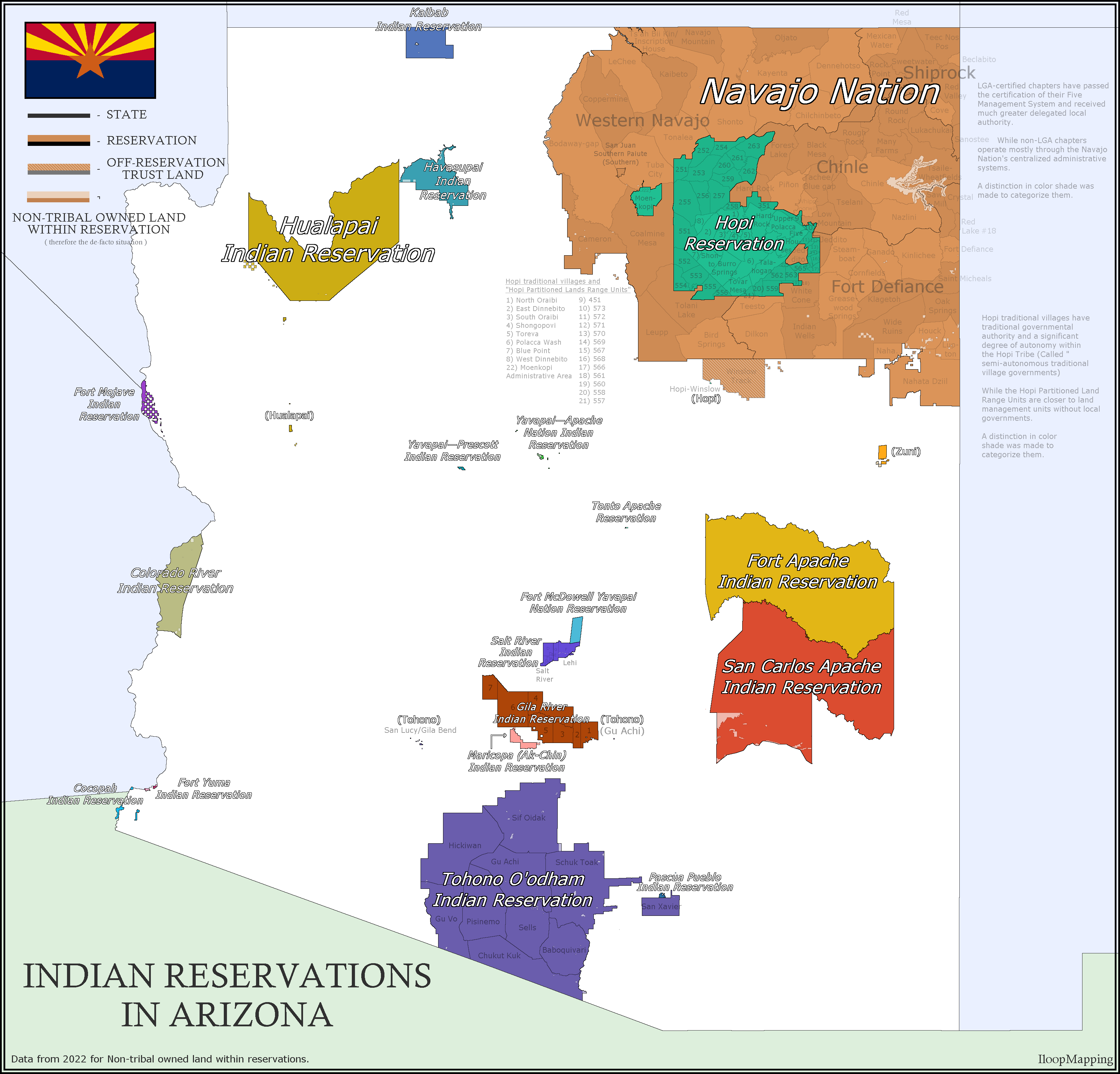
Map of Gila River Indian Community and neighboring tribes

The reservation is composed of seven districts that the community members reside in:

East End

- District 1- Blackwater
- District 2- Hashan Kehk

Central

- District 3- Sacaton (capital)
- District 4- Santan
- District 5- Casa Blanca

West End

- District 6- Komatke
- District 7- Maricopa Colony

These are the following villages within the reservation:

- Bapchule (Pi:pchul)
- Blackwater (Chukma Shuhthagi)
- Casa Blanca
- Co-op Village (Chichino)
- Gila Crossing (Kuiwa)
- Goodyear (Valin Dak)
- Lone Butte Ranch (33°13′57″N 112°02′50″W)
- Komatke (Komaḍk)
- Maricopa Village
- Maricopa Colony
- Sacate Village
- Sacaton (Geʼe Ki:)
- Sacaton Flats (Ha:shañ Ke:k)
- St. John's
- Santa Cruz (Hia-t-ab)
- Santan/Santa Ana (Santan)
- Stotonic (S-totoñigk)
- Sweetwater (S-iʼovĭ Shu:dagĭ)
- Vahki (Va'akih)
- Wet Camp Village

== Transportation ==
The community owns and operates Gila River Memorial Airport, a small, private-use airport, located 4 miles southwest of the central business district of Chandler. It was used for cropdusting and air charter operations, with no scheduled commercial services. The airport is no longer used and is in a state of total abandonment. The community also operates Gila River Transit, a public transit system serving all seven districts.

I-10 was built through the southeast to north-central portion, as well as Loop 202 built on the north-west of Gila River lands, bringing significant highway traffic through the area, and providing easier access to enter the city from the reservation.

== Laws ==
The Constitution and Bylaws of the Gila River Indian Community of Arizona was ratified by the tribe January 22, 1960, and approved by the US Secretary of the Interior on March 17, 1960. It is available online.

The current Gila River legal code was enacted in 2009. Amendments enacted 15 May 2013, are available online.

The Gila River Indian Community Police Department is responsible for law enforcement within the Gila River Indian Community One officer of the Gila River Indian Community Police Department has been killed in the line of duty.

=== Marriage law ===
Gila River does not recognize marriages performed elsewhere in the state of Arizona. On July 15, 2015, in response to the Obergefell v. Hodges Supreme Court ruling legalizing same-sex marriage in the United States, the Community Council passed a motion by a vote of 14 to 2 that the gendered language of the Gila River marriage code meant that same-sex marriage was not recognized:

1) The Community Council exercises its sovereignty and recognizes that the intent of GRIC code, Title 9, Section 9.103 is that a marriage is between and man and a woman; 2) the Community will maintain the status quo – that same sex marriage is not traditionally recognized in the Community – pending full consideration by the Standing Committees, Community Council and Community members and of any legislative changes; 3) the Community Court shall not issue any marriage licenses to couples of the same sex and no appointed or elected official of the Community shall officiate at any same sex marriage which takes place on the Gila River Indian Reservation; 4) the Office of General Counsel is directed to draft and present amendments to the GRIC Code within 30 days which more clearly recognizes and codifies the Community's historical tradition, both Akimel Oʼodham and Pee Posh, of not permitting or recognizing same-sex or common law marriages since time immemorial.

== Community holidays ==
These are the various holidays that are celebrated throughout the community.

=== Mul-Chu-Tha ===
Mul-Chu-Tha is the yearly tribal fair that was established in 1962 to promote unity and a way to honor the ancestors. It started out as a fundraising event for build a community pool to promote positive activities as well as family interactions. The term Mul-Chu-Tha is an Oʼodham word for "foot races", referring when people used to run on foot to travel village-to-village to deliver news or do as a recreational activity. So the community felt it best fit for the name of the fair.

=== Mustering-In Day ===
Mustering-In Day is a yearly event held in September to celebrate Piipaash and Akimel O'odham warriors, who were mustered in as Arizona's "First National Guard" in 1865. It consisted of volunteered men who enrolled to be in service. 94 Piipaash warriors were in Company B, led by Piipaash chief Juan Chivaria. While 88 Akimel O'odham warriors were in Company C, led by Akimel O'odham chief Antonio Azule. Since the United States military was primarily focused on the Civil War, there were few soldiers guarding the Arizona territory from war raids and land disputes. This led to the formation of five companies, including Company B and C, to protect the land and provide stability. Company B and C were officially federally mustered in on September 2, 1865, at Maricopa Wells.

=== Water Rights Day ===
Water Rights Day is celebrated on December 10 every year to honor the Water Rights Settlement Act. On December 10, 2004, the tribe won the settlement to secure 653,500 acres-feet of water annually. This makes it one of the largest tribal water settlements in U.S. history.

== Notable Gila River tribal members ==
- Beulah Archuletta (1909–1969), née Donahue, was an Piipaash (Maricopa) actress.
- Ida Redbird (1892–1971), was a renowned Piipaash (Maricopa) master potter who specialized in the traditional paddle and anvil technique.
- Ira Hayes (1923–1955), Akimel O'odham, one of the six Marines depicted in the Raising the Flag on Iwo Jima photograph.
- Jay Morago (1917–2008), Akimel O'odham, served as the first governor of the Gila River Indian Community from 1954 until 1960 and helped to draft the reservation's 1960 constitution.
- Mary Thomas (1944–2014), the first Akimel O'odham woman elected as Governor of the Gila River Indian Community, serving from 1994 until 2000.
- Natalie Diaz (born 1978), Pulitzer-prize winning Akimel O'odham poet, educator, and activist
- Big Chief Russell Moore (1912–1983), was an renowned Akimel O'odham jazz trombonist.

== See also ==
- Gila River Indian Community Emergency Medical Services
- Salt River Pima-Maricopa Indian Community
