= Gila Crossing, Arizona =

CDP in Maricopa County, Arizona

Gila Crossing, Arizona O'odham: Kuiwa
- Census-designated place
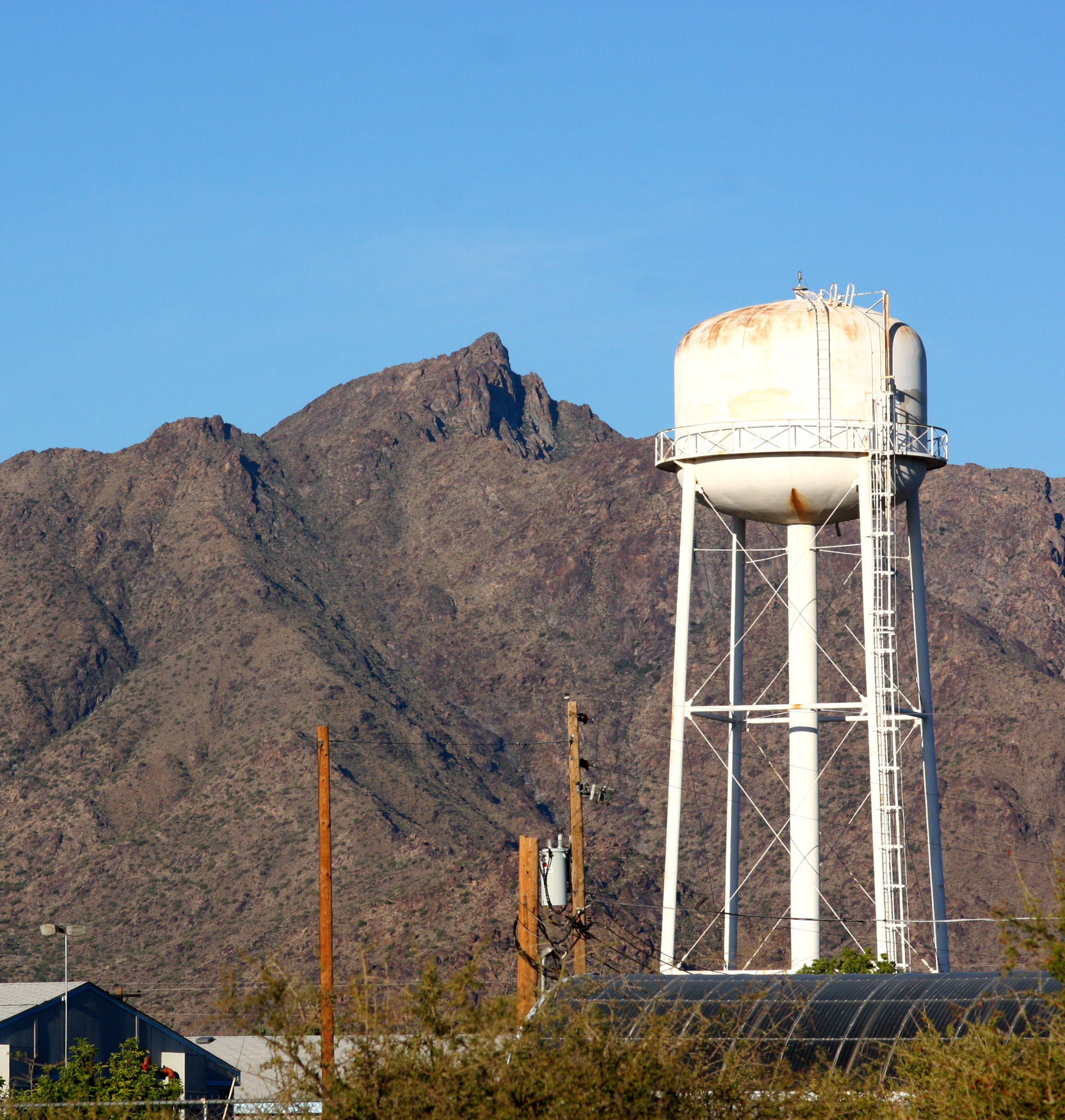

- Location in Maricopa County, Arizona

- Location within Arizona Location within the United States
- Coordinates: 33°16′23″N 112°09′46″W
- Country: United States
- State: Arizona
- County: Maricopa

Area
  - Total: 0.87 sq mi (2.25 km^{2})
  - Land: 0.87 sq mi (2.25 km^{2})
  - Water: 0 sq mi (0.00 km^{2})
- Elevation: 1,040 ft (320 m)

Population (2020)
  - Total: 636
  - Density: 730.8/sq mi (282.16/km^{2})
- Time zone: UTC-7 (MST (no DST))
- ZIP code: 85339
- Area code: 520
- FIPS code: 04-27260
- GNIS feature ID: 2612138

Gila Crossing (O'odham: Kuiwa) is a census-designated place (CDP) in Maricopa County, Arizona, United States, within the Gila River Indian Community south of Komatke. The population was 636 at the 2020 census.

== Geography ==
The community is on the southern side of the Phoenix metropolitan area, in the valley of the Gila River. It is bordered to the north by Komatke and St. Johns, while the community of Santa Cruz is 3 miles (5 km) to the south, across the Gila River in Pinal County. Downtown Phoenix is 16 miles (26 km) to the northeast.

== Demographics ==
Historical population
Census	Pop.	Note	%±
2010	621		—
2020	636		2.4%
U.S. Decennial Census

As of the census of 2010, there were 621 people living in the CDP. The population density was 714.5 people per square mile. The racial makeup of the CDP was 84% Native American, 3% White, 1% Black or African American, 1% from other races, and 11% from two or more races. 15% of the population were Hispanic or Latino of any race.

== Transportation ==
Gila River Transit connects Gila Crossing with Komatke and Maricopa Colony.

== Education ==
It is not in any school district.

The K-8 tribal school Gila Crossing Community School, affiliated with the Bureau of Indian Education, is in neighboring Komatke.
