= Morristown Elementary School District =

School district in Arizona, United States

Address
- 25950 Rockaway Hills Drive Morristown, Arizona, 85342; United States

District information
- Type: Public
- Grades: PreK–8
- NCES District ID: 0405340

Students and staff
- Students: 114
- Teachers: 9.0
- Staff: 10.2
- Student–teacher ratio: 12.67

Other information
- Website: www.morristowneld75.org

Morristown School District 75 is a school district in Maricopa County, Arizona.

It includes Morristown and Circle City. The city limits of Buckeye extend into this district.
