= Maricopa Colony, Arizona =

CDP in Maricopa County, Arizona

- Census-designated place
- Location in Maricopa County, Arizona

- Location within Arizona Location within the United States
- Coordinates: 33°22′35″N 112°14′22″W
- Country: United States
- State: Arizona
- County: Maricopa

Area
  - Total: 5.49 sq mi (14.21 km^{2})
  - Land: 5.49 sq mi (14.21 km^{2})
  - Water: 0 sq mi (0.00 km^{2})
- Elevation: 991 ft (302 m)

Population (2020)
  - Total: 854
  - Density: 155.7/sq mi (60.12/km^{2})
- Time zone: UTC-7 (MST (no DST))
- ZIP code: 85339
- Area code: 520
- FIPS code: 04-44450
- GNIS feature ID: 2612141

Maricopa Colony is a census-designated place (CDP) in Maricopa County, Arizona, United States, located in the federally recognized Gila River Indian Community. The population was 854 at the 2020 census, up from 709 at the 2010 census. It is located on the southern side of the Phoenix metropolitan area, around Baseline Road and 83rd Avenue.

== Demographics ==
Historical population
| Census | Pop. | Note | %± |
|---|---|---|---|
| 2010 | 709 | | — |
| 2020 | 854 | | 20.5% |
U.S. Decennial Census

As of the census of 2010, there were 709 people living in the CDP. The racial makeup of the CDP was 1% White, 92% Native American, 4% from other races, and 3% from two or more races. 14% of the population were Hispanic or Latino of any race.

== Transportation ==
Gila River Transit connects Maricopa Colony with Komatke.

== Education ==
Most of Maricopa Colony is not in any school district. A portion of Maricopa Colony is in the Union Elementary School District and the Tolleson Union High School District.

The K-8 tribal school Gila Crossing Community School, affiliated with the Bureau of Indian Education, is in nearby Komatke.
