= Co-op Village, Arizona =

Populated place in Maricopa County, Arizona

- Populated place
- Location within Arizona Location within the United States
- Coordinates: 33°20′11″N 112°12′29″W
- Country: United States
- State: Arizona
- County: Maricopa
- Elevation: 1,007 ft (307 m)
- Time zone: UTC-7 (Mountain (MST))
  - Summer (DST): UTC-7 (MST)
- Area code: 623
- FIPS code: 04-15570
- GNIS feature ID: 3046

Co-op Village is a populated place situated in Maricopa County, Arizona, United States. It is located in the Gila River Indian Community. It has an estimated elevation of 1,007 feet (307 m) above sea level.
