= Paloma Elementary School District =

School district in Arizona, United States

Paloma School District 94

Location
- 38739 W. Interstate 8 Theba, Arizona(Gila Bend mailing address) 85337 United States

Other information
- Website: www.palomaesd.org

Paloma School District 94 is a public school district based in Maricopa County, Arizona. It serves the community of Theba, Arizona.
