= Eagletail Mountains Wilderness =

Protected wilderness area in Arizona, United States

- IUCN category Ib (wilderness area)
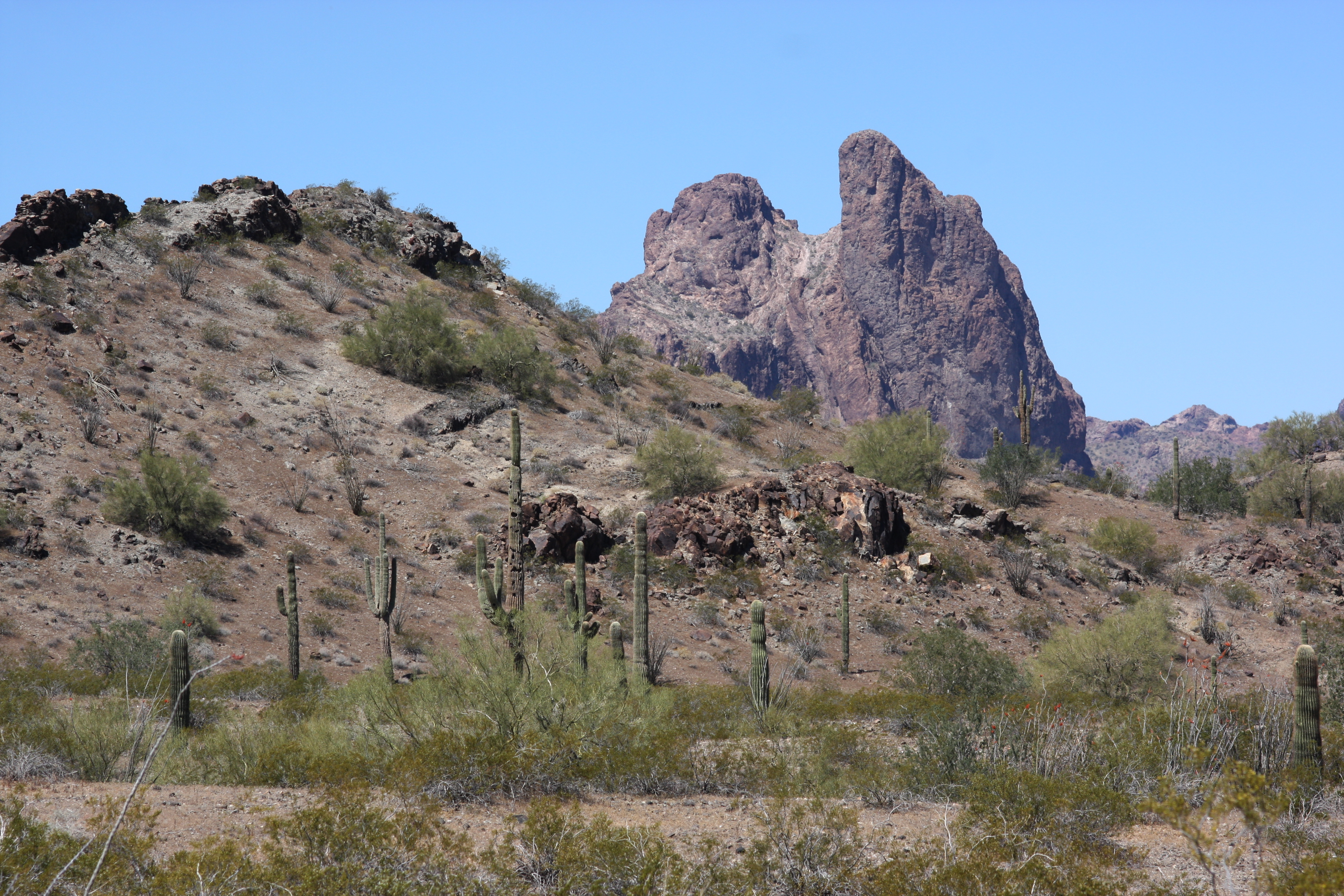

- Location within Arizona
- Location: Centennial, AZ–Tonopah, AZ (Hyder, AZ), (northwest)-Sonoran Desert, Arizona, United States
- Coordinates: 33.44550°N 113.39761°W
- Area: 407 km^{2} (157 sq mi)
- Established: 1990's

The 100,600-acre (407 km^{2}) Eagletail Mountains Wilderness is part of the Eagletail Mountains of central-west Arizona, about 65 mi west of Phoenix. The wilderness is of moderate size, with the Eagletail Mountains forming its northeast perimeter, and the much shorter Cemetery Ridge section, forming its southwest border. The wilderness covers nearly all of the Eagletail Mountains and the plains on its southwest. The wilderness lies at the southeast of the Ranegras Plain, the headwater region of Bouse Wash, and lies adjacent to the northwest border of the extensive Gila Bend Mountains, the mountain range causing the great Gila Bend excursion of the Gila River, in Arizona.

The Eagletail Mountains Wilderness lies in extreme southeast La Paz County, and is also at the intersection of Maricopa County to the east, and Yuma County to the southwest.

== Access ==
The Eagletail Mountains, and the wilderness parallel a slightly southeast-trending stretch of Interstate 10 in Arizona. The region lies to the south; Centennial, Arizona is the closest exit, only 5 mi north. Tonopah is further east on I-10, at about 20 mi. The wilderness can be accessed from the south by unimproved roads from Hyder, about 25 mi away.

== See also ==
- List of U.S. Wilderness Areas
- List of Arizona Wilderness Areas
- Wilderness Act
