= Theba, Arizona =

CDP in Maricopa County, Arizona

- Census-designated place
- Location in Maricopa County, Arizona

- Location within Arizona Location within the United States
- Coordinates: 32°55′10″N 112°52′41″W
- Country: United States
- State: Arizona
- County: Maricopa

Area
  - Total: 0.62 sq mi (1.61 km^{2})
  - Land: 0.62 sq mi (1.61 km^{2})
  - Water: 0 sq mi (0.00 km^{2})
- Elevation: 732 ft (223 m)

Population (2020)
  - Total: 111
  - Density: 178.6/sq mi (68.94/km^{2})
- Time zone: UTC-7 (Mountain (MST))
- ZIP code: 85337 (Gila Bend)
- FIPS code: 04-73490
- GNIS feature ID: 2582876

Theba is an unincorporated community and census-designated place (CDP) in Maricopa County, Arizona, United States. Theba is located along Interstate 8 and is served by Exit 106. As of the 2020 census, it had a population of 111, down from 158 in 2010.

The Rowley Mine, a private copper mine known as a source of the mineral wulfenite, is located near the settlement. The large Paloma Ranch was located near Theba before it was broken up. The area is frequently marked as Paloma on maps.

== History ==
The area, which is in the Sonoran Desert, was a farming area into the 1960s, and once had significant crops of melons, jojoba, and guar in the 1970s, which is used in the oil industry. The Southern Pacific Company once had a railroad station there, served by Wells Fargo. The population was estimated at 200 in 1960.

Theba is the nearest community to the Painted Rocks, a site of ancient petroglyphs that was listed on the National Register of Historic Places in 1977.

== Demographics ==
Historical population
Census	Pop.	Note	%±
2010	158		—
2020	111		−29.7%
U.S. Decennial Census

As of the census of 2010, there were 158 people living in the CDP. The population density was 254.2 people per square mile. The racial makeup of the CDP was 37% White and 63% from other races. 96% of the population were Hispanic or Latino of any race.

== Education ==
The Theba/Paloma area is served by the Paloma Elementary School District.

Theba Elementary School made headlines across the state of Arizona in 1977, when school administrators refused to sign a federal pledge agreeing not to discriminate against women. The school was one of the few in the country which refused to sign the agreement, disqualifying them from receiving federal funding. According to school administrators, the school refused to sign because they had never received federal funding anyway.
