= Nadaburg Unified School District =

School district in Wittmann, Arizona

Address
- 32919 North Center Street Wittman, Arizona, 85361; United States

District information
- Type: Public
- Grades: PreK–12
- NCES District ID: 0405460

Students and staff
- Students: 820
- Teachers: 42.0
- Staff: 86.18
- Student–teacher ratio: 19.52

Other information
- Website: www.nadaburgsd.org

The Nadaburg Unified School District is the K-12 school district in the town of Wittmann, Arizona. It operates two elementary schools: Nadaburg Elementary (the historical school in the town), as well as Desert Oasis Elementary inside Surprise city limits. The district opened its first high school, called Mountainside High School, in 2020. although for the first 4 years, classes were being taught in one of the buildings at Nadaburg School until 2024, when the high school was officially built. Prior to this, Nadaburg students attended Wickenburg High School in that town, roughly twenty miles up US 60.

As a unified school district in Arizona, the Nadaburg district has the authority to operate its own high school. A district must be considered "unified" to serve both K-8 and high school students, as demonstrated by the need for the J.O. Combs Unified School District to actually hold a unification vote before beginning to build its own high school.

On November 5, 2019, Nadaburg residents voted in favor of passing a bond that would go towards construction of a new high school. Ninth grade students will begin taking classes in the fall of 2020 in the existing Nadaburg School building, followed by tenth graders in the fall of 2021. Nadaburg was originally planning to open a high school by 2010, and then 2013.

== History ==
Upon W.H. Griffin filing his homestead petition in September 1920 establishing the town of Nadaburg, now Wittman, he drilled a well and built a small board and batten house which served as the town’s first school house. Griffin’s four oldest sons, along with eight or nine other pupils from other nearby homesteads, attended school. Helen Carpenter was the first teacher in that original school house.

In 1921, a permanent structure was built but was damaged by fire in 1926. The building was rebuilt that same year which still stands today, now serving as the Nadaburg Unified School District Governing Board’s Boardroom, known as the “little red schoolhouse.”

Maricopa County threatened to close the school and the district in 1939 due to low attendance. As a result, Griffin advertised the school and district in newspapers offering five acres or two town lots in order to increase the local population and attendance.

== Boundary ==
The district includes Wittmann and sections of Peoria and Surprise.

== Schools ==
The Nadaburg School District has three schools.

- Nadaburg Elementary School - opened 1921, offers Kindergarten through 8th grade.
- Desert Oasis Elementary School - opened 2008, offers Kindergarten through 8th grade.
- Mountainside High School - opened 2020, offers 9th through 12th grades.

The district also offers online classes through its Virtual Academy.
