= Union Elementary School District =

School district in Arizona, United States

Address
- 3834 South 91st Avenue Tolleson, Arizona, 85353; United States

District information
- Type: Public
- Grades: PreK–8
- NCES District ID: 0408820

Students and staff
- Students: 1,639
- Teachers: 81.75
- Staff: 86.41
- Student–teacher ratio: 20.05

Other information
- Website: www.unionesd.org

Union School District 62 is a school district in Tolleson, Arizona located in Maricopa County, Arizona. Union E.S.D encompasses three schools. Union Elementary School is a Kindergarten to Second grade campus servicing families residing between 83rd Ave and 99th Ave, South of Lower Buckeye Rd. Hurley Ranch Elementary School is a Third grade to Eight grade campus servicing families residing between 83rd Ave and 99th Ave, South of Lower Buckeye Rd. Dos Rios Elementary School is a Kindergarten to Eight grade campus servicing families residing between 83rd Ave and 99th Ave, North of Lower Buckeye Rd and South of Buckeye Rd.
