= Komatke, Arizona =

CDP in Maricopa County, Arizona

Komatke, Arizona O'odham: Komaḍk
- Census-designated place
- Location in Maricopa County, Arizona

- Location within Arizona Location within the United States
- Coordinates: 33°17′32″N 112°09′39″W
- Country: United States
- State: Arizona
- County: Maricopa

Area
  - Total: 2.43 sq mi (6.30 km^{2})
  - Land: 2.43 sq mi (6.30 km^{2})
  - Water: 0 sq mi (0.00 km^{2})
- Elevation: 1,066 ft (325 m)

Population (2020)
  - Total: 1,013
  - Density: 416.3/sq mi (160.74/km^{2})
- Time zone: UTC-7 (Mountain (MST))
- ZIP code: 85339 (Laveen)
- FIPS code: 04-38655
- GNIS feature ID: 2582810

Komatke (O'odham: Komaḍk) is a census-designated place in Maricopa County, Arizona, United States. The area currently comprising the census-designated place had a population of 1,013 at the 2020 census, up from 821 at the 2010 census. It is located within the Gila River Indian Community. Its name refers to the Sierra Estrella mountain range, which rises just to the southwest of Komatke.

== Geography ==
Komatke is located directly south of Laveen, 15 miles southwest of Downtown Phoenix.

According to the United States Census Bureau, the CDP has a total area of 2.4 square miles (6.2 km^{2}), all land.

Saint John the Baptist Parish Laveen, the Saint Johns Mission, is in Komatke. The name is taken from the mission school founded by the Franciscans in 1894. It has an estimated elevation of 1,030 feet (310 m) above sea level.

== Demographics ==
Historical population
Census	Pop.	Note	%±
2000	1,174		—
2010	821		−30.1%
2020	1,013		23.4%
U.S. Decennial Census

=== 2020 census ===
As of the 2020 census, Komatke had a population of 1,013. The median age was 25.3 years. 36.3% of residents were under the age of 18 and 6.3% of residents were 65 years of age or older. For every 100 females there were 101.0 males, and for every 100 females age 18 and over there were 94.3 males age 18 and over.

0.0% of residents lived in urban areas, while 100.0% lived in rural areas.

There were 235 households in Komatke, of which 55.3% had children under the age of 18 living in them. Of all households, 24.3% were married-couple households, 23.8% were households with a male householder and no spouse or partner present, and 39.6% were households with a female householder and no spouse or partner present. About 19.2% of all households were made up of individuals and 7.6% had someone living alone who was 65 years of age or older.

There were 239 housing units, of which 1.7% were vacant. The homeowner vacancy rate was 0.0% and the rental vacancy rate was 0.0%.

Racial composition as of the 2020 census
Race	Number	Percent
White	8	0.8%
Black or African American	4	0.4%
American Indian and Alaska Native	956	94.4%
Asian	0	0.0%
Native Hawaiian and Other Pacific Islander	0	0.0%
Some other race	27	2.7%
Two or more races	18	1.8%
Hispanic or Latino (of any race)	121	11.9%

=== 2000 census ===
As of the 2000 census, there were 1,174 people, 241 households, and 218 families residing in Komatke. The population density was 227.3 inhabitants per square mile (87.8/km^{2}). There were 256 housing units at an average density of 49.6 per square mile (19.2/km^{2}). The racial makeup of Komatke is 1.6% White, 0.1% Black or African American, 93.6% Native American, <0.1% Asian, <0.1% Pacific Islander, and 2.3% from other races, and 2.4% from two or more races. 15.8% of the population were Hispanic of any race.

== Education ==
The K-8 tribal school Gila Crossing Community School, affiliated with the Bureau of Indian Education, is in Komatke.

The CDP is not in any school district.

== Transportation ==
Valley Metro Bus route 51 connects Komatke with Phoenix and Glendale. Gila River Transit connects Komatke with Maricopa Colony.
