= Morristown, Arizona =

CDP in Maricopa County, Arizona

- Census-designated place
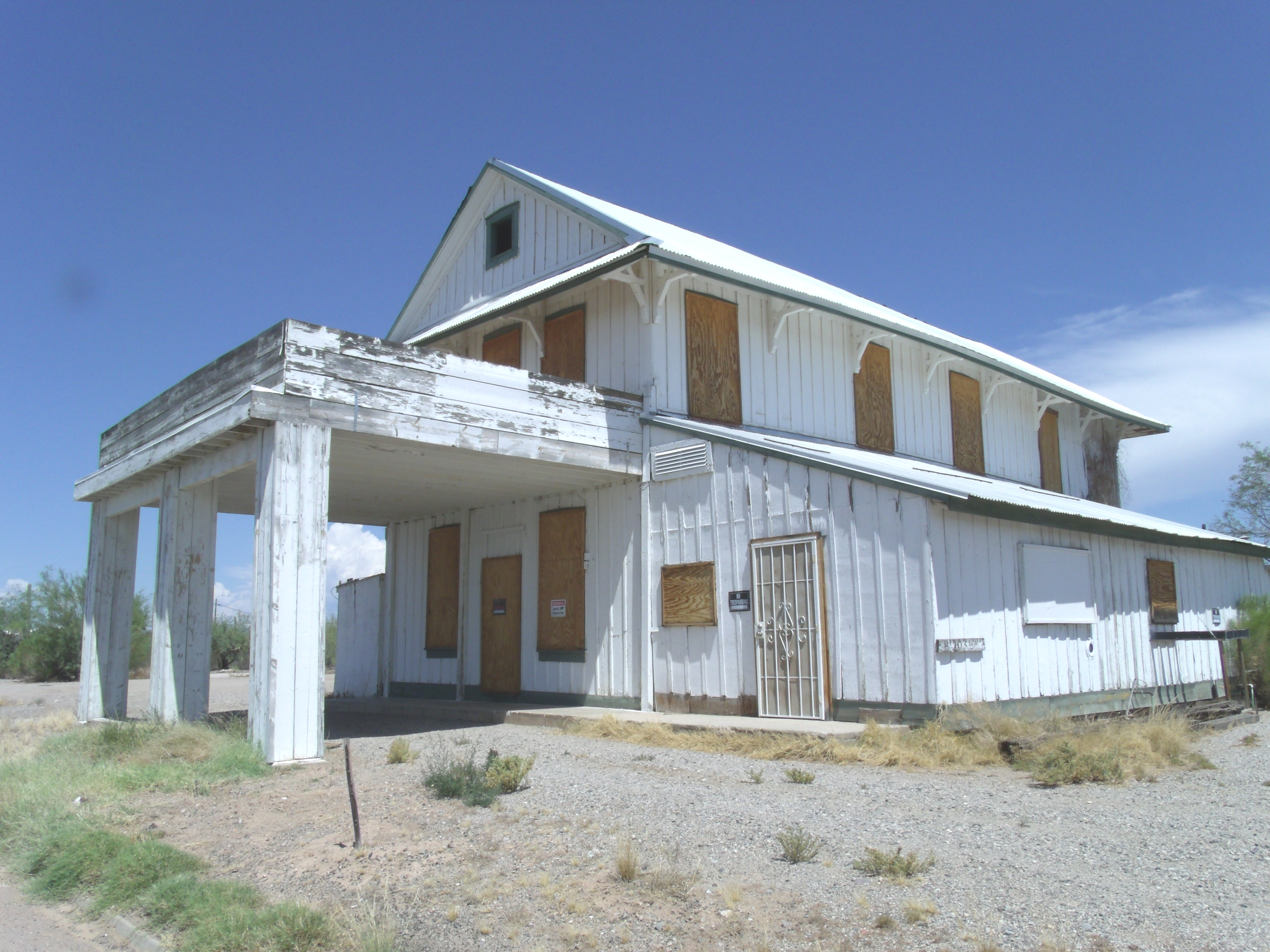
- Historic Morristown Hotel/Store-1899; Listed in the National Register of Historic Places

- Location in Maricopa County, Arizona

- Location within Arizona Location within the United States
- Coordinates: 33°51′24″N 112°37′24″W
- Country: United States
- State: Arizona
- County: Maricopa

Area
  - Total: 0.97 sq mi (2.52 km^{2})
  - Land: 0.97 sq mi (2.52 km^{2})
  - Water: 0 sq mi (0.00 km^{2})
- Elevation: 1,988 ft (606 m)

Population (2020)
  - Total: 186
  - Density: 191.3/sq mi (73.88/km^{2})
- Time zone: UTC-7 (Mountain (MST))
- ZIP code: 85342
- FIPS code: 04-47750
- GNIS feature ID: 8311

Morristown is an unincorporated community and census-designated place (CDP) in Maricopa County, Arizona, United States. It is 43 miles (69 km) northwest of Phoenix, at the junction of State Route 74 and U.S. Route 60. As of the 2020 census, it had a population of 186, down from 227 in 2010.

Morristown is home to the Morristown Elementary School District.

The Morristown Store, formerly the Morristown Hotel, is listed on the National Register of Historic Places.

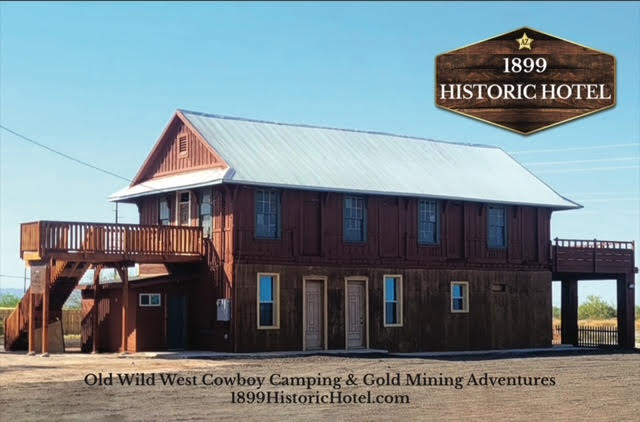
1899 Historic Hotel Landmark & Campground

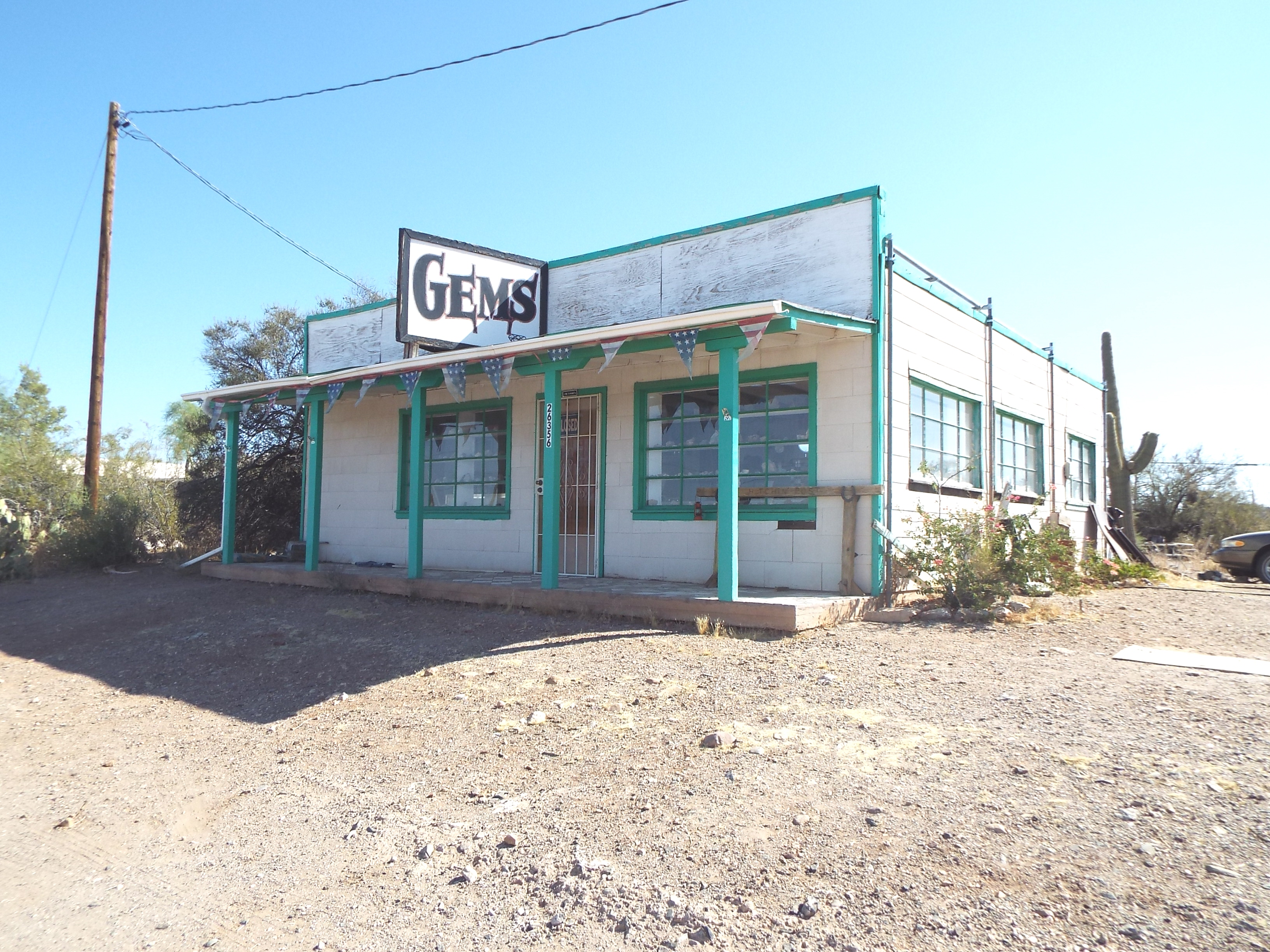
Commercial building built in 1920 located on US 60 in Morristown

Much of Morristown is within the municipal planning area of Surprise, and Surprise intends to eventually annex the area. The portion of Morristown south of US 60, however, exists in a small area between the planning areas of Surprise, Buckeye and Wickenburg, where neither city has yet expressed a planned interest in expanding. The community is named after Morristown, New Jersey.

Morristown is also known for being the birthplace and deathplace of famed Internet celebrity cat, Grumpy Cat.

Maricopa County Parks and Recreation Department has its headquarters Unit Operations Center in Morristown.

== Demographics ==
Historical population
Census	Pop.	Note	%±
2010	227		—
2020	186		−18.1%
U.S. Decennial Census

As of the census of 2010, there were 227 people living in the CDP. The population density was 508.1 people per square mile. The racial makeup of the CDP was 96% White, 3% from other races, and 1% from two or more races. 5% of the population were Hispanic or Latino of any race.

== Education ==
It is in the Morristown Elementary School District.

== See also ==
- Castle Hot Springs (Arizona)
- Hieroglyphic Mountains
