= Santan, Arizona =

CDP in Pinal County, Arizona, United States

Santan
- Unincorporated community
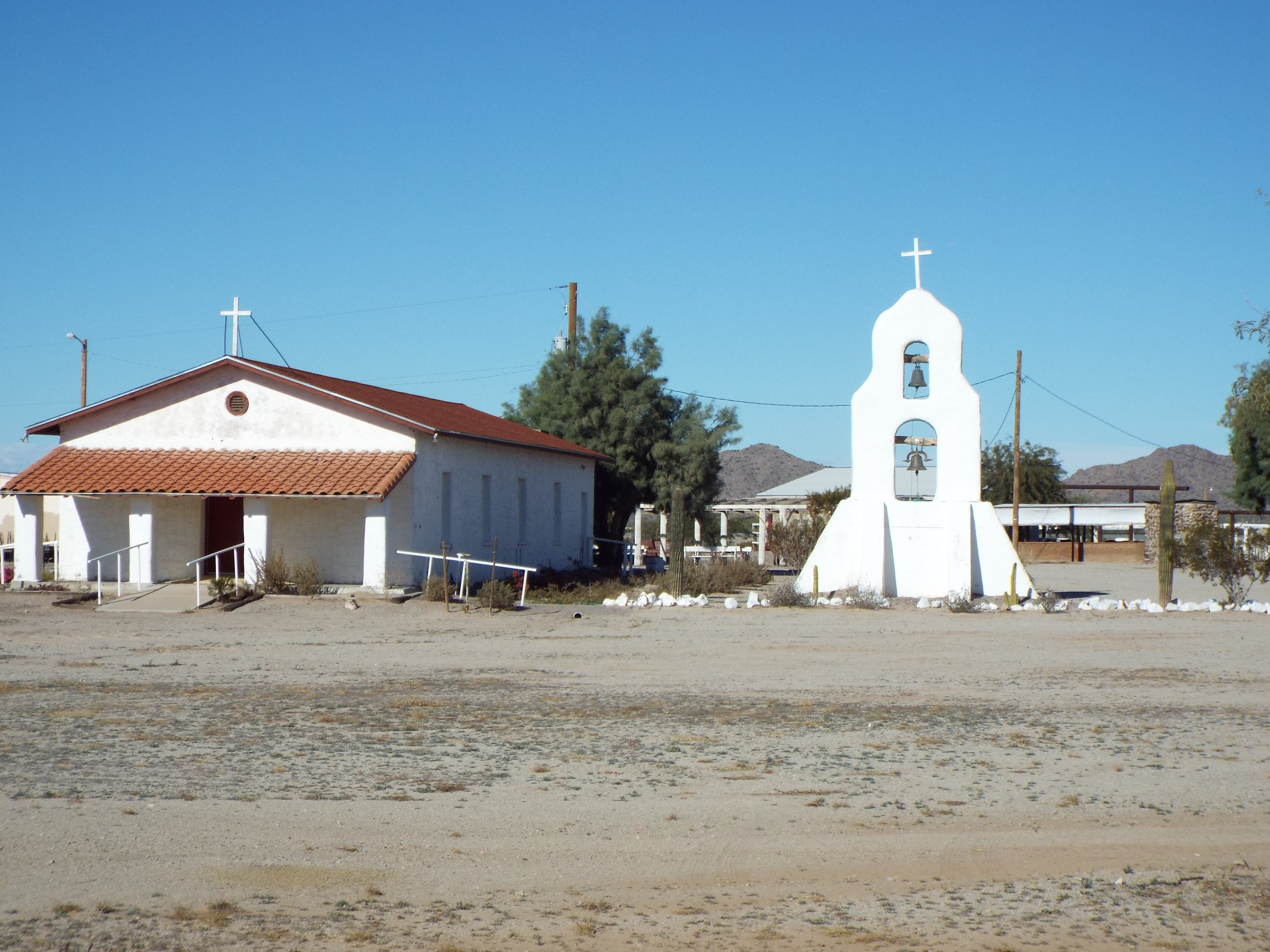
- Saint Anne Catholic Church Mission

- Location of Santan in Pinal County, Arizona

- Location in the United States
- Coordinates: 33°10′33″N 111°47′57″W
- Country: United States
- State: Arizona
- County: Pinal

Area
  - Total: 6.4 sq mi (16.6 km^{2})
  - Land: 6.4 sq mi (16.6 km^{2})
  - Water: 0 sq mi (0.0 km^{2})
- Elevation: 1,234 ft (376 m)

Population (2000)
  - Total: 651
  - Density: 101/sq mi (39.1/km^{2})
- Time zone: UTC-7 (Mountain (MST))
- FIPS code: 04-64100
- GNIS feature ID: 24606

Santan is an unincorporated community, and former census-designated place (CDP), in Pinal County, Arizona, United States. The settlement was named "Santa Ana" by its Akimel O'odham inhabitants in 1857, and pronounced "Santana".

== Geography ==
According to the United States Census Bureau, the former CDP had a total area of 6.4 square miles (17 km^{2}), all land.

== Demographics ==
As of the census of 2000, there were 651 people, 163 households, and 135 families residing in the CDP. The population density was 101.3 inhabitants per square mile (39.1/km^{2}). There were 185 housing units at an average density of 28.8 per square mile (11.1/km^{2}). The racial makeup of the CDP was 2% White, 93% Native American, 3% from other races, and 2% from two or more races. 13% of the population were Hispanic or Latino of any race.

There were 163 households, out of which 51% had children under the age of 18 living with them, 33% were married couples living together, 36% had a female householder with no husband present, and 17% were non-families. 16% of all households were made up of individuals, and 6% had someone living alone who was 65 years of age or older. The average household size was 4.0 and the average family size was 4.3.

In the CDP, the population was spread out, with 42.2% under the age of 18, 9.1% from 18 to 24, 28.4% from 25 to 44, 14.4% from 45 to 64, and 5.8% who were 65 years of age or older. The median age was 24 years. For every 100 females, there were 79.8 males. For every 100 females age 18 and over, there were 84.3 males.

The median income for a household in the CDP was $16,645, and the median income for a family was $15,227. Males had a median income of $37,857 versus $7,386 for females. The per capita income for the CDP was $7,090. About 46% of families and 46% of the population were below the poverty line, including 78% of those under age 18 and none of those age 65 or over.

Although it's a very small town now, it is expected to grow quickly along with the rest of Pinal County.

== Historic Saint Anne Catholic Church Mission ==
Saint Anne Catholic Church Mission (Santan)
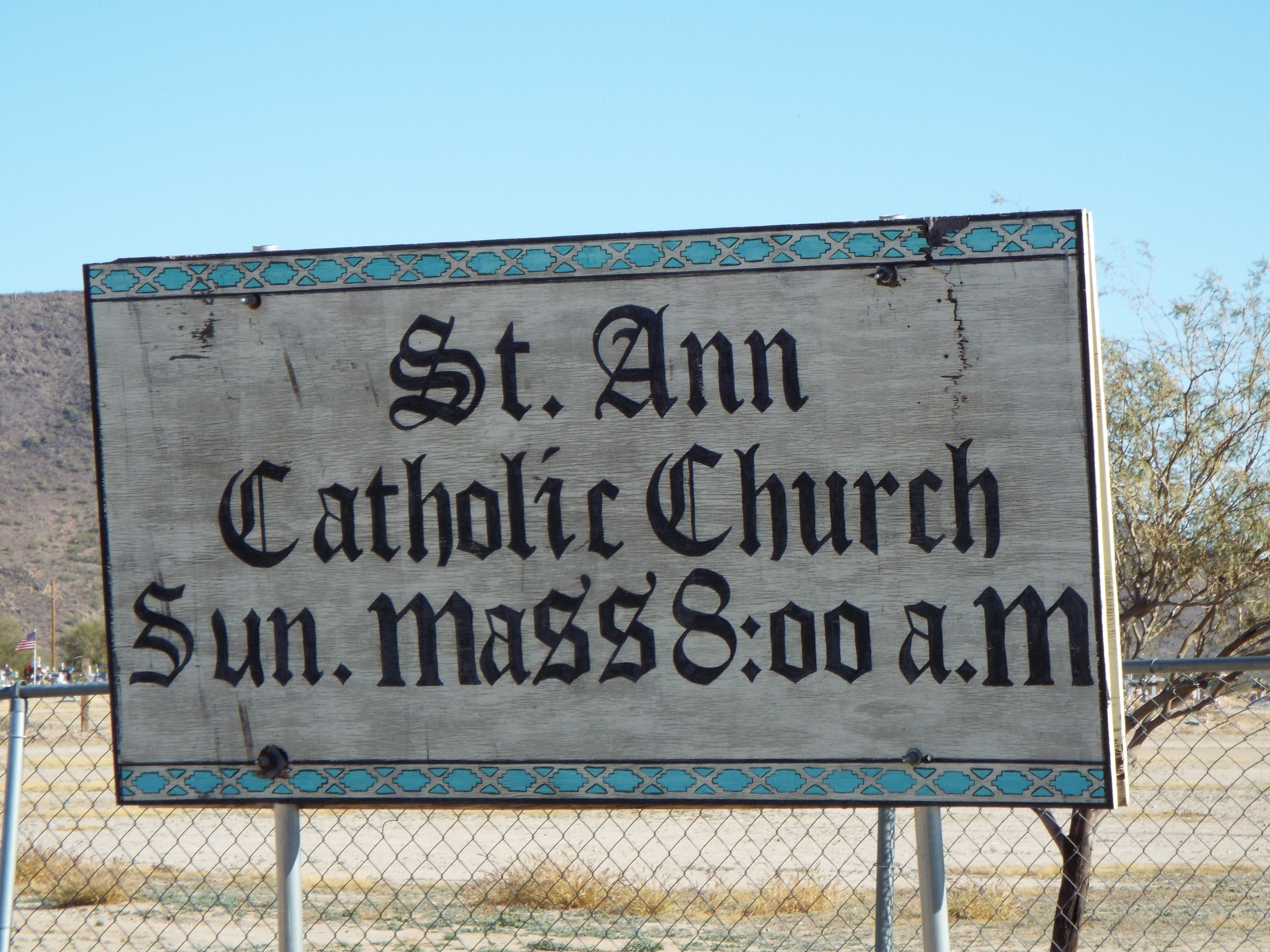
Saint Anne Catholic Church Mission sign

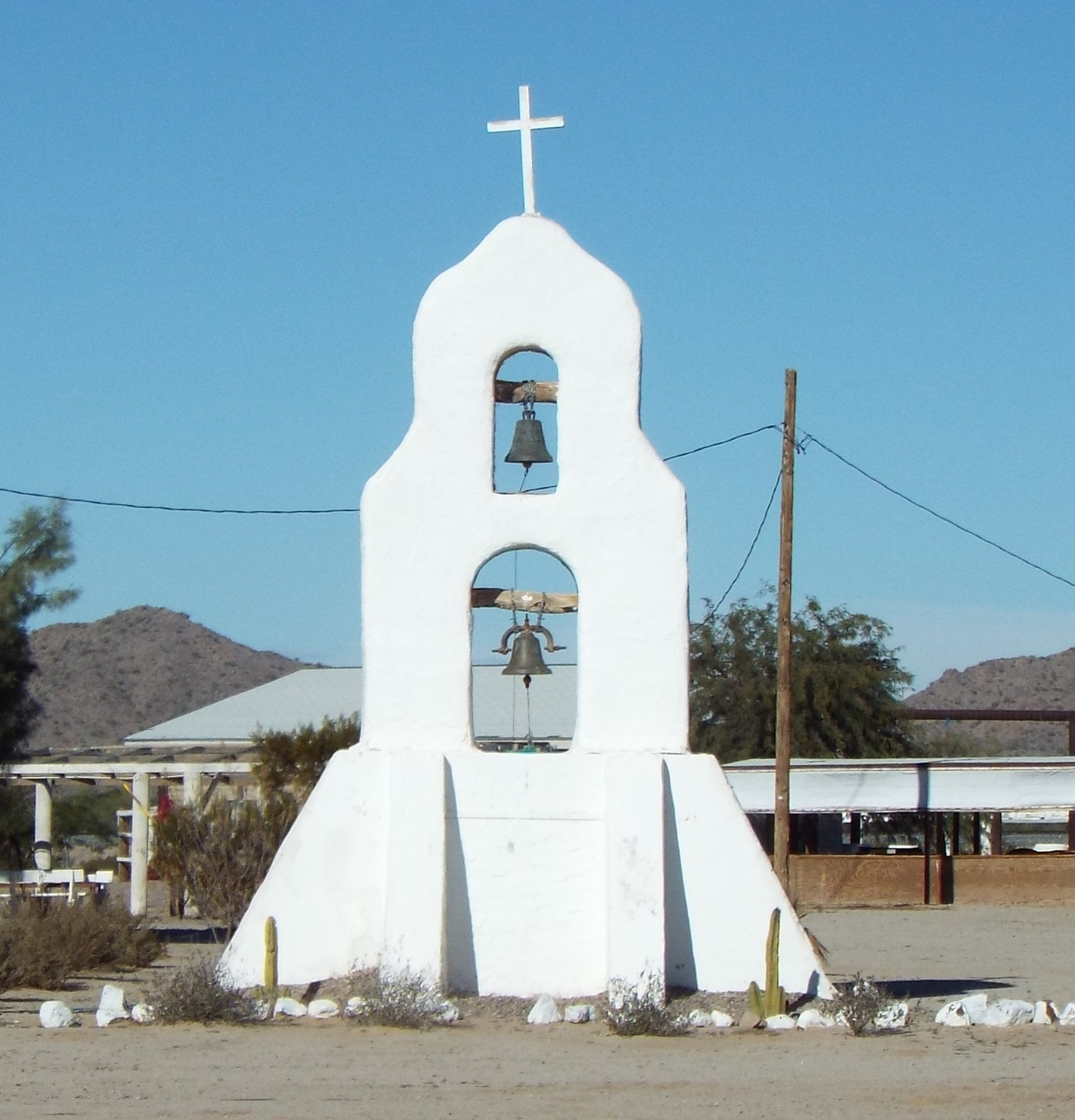
Saint Anne Catholic Church Mission bells

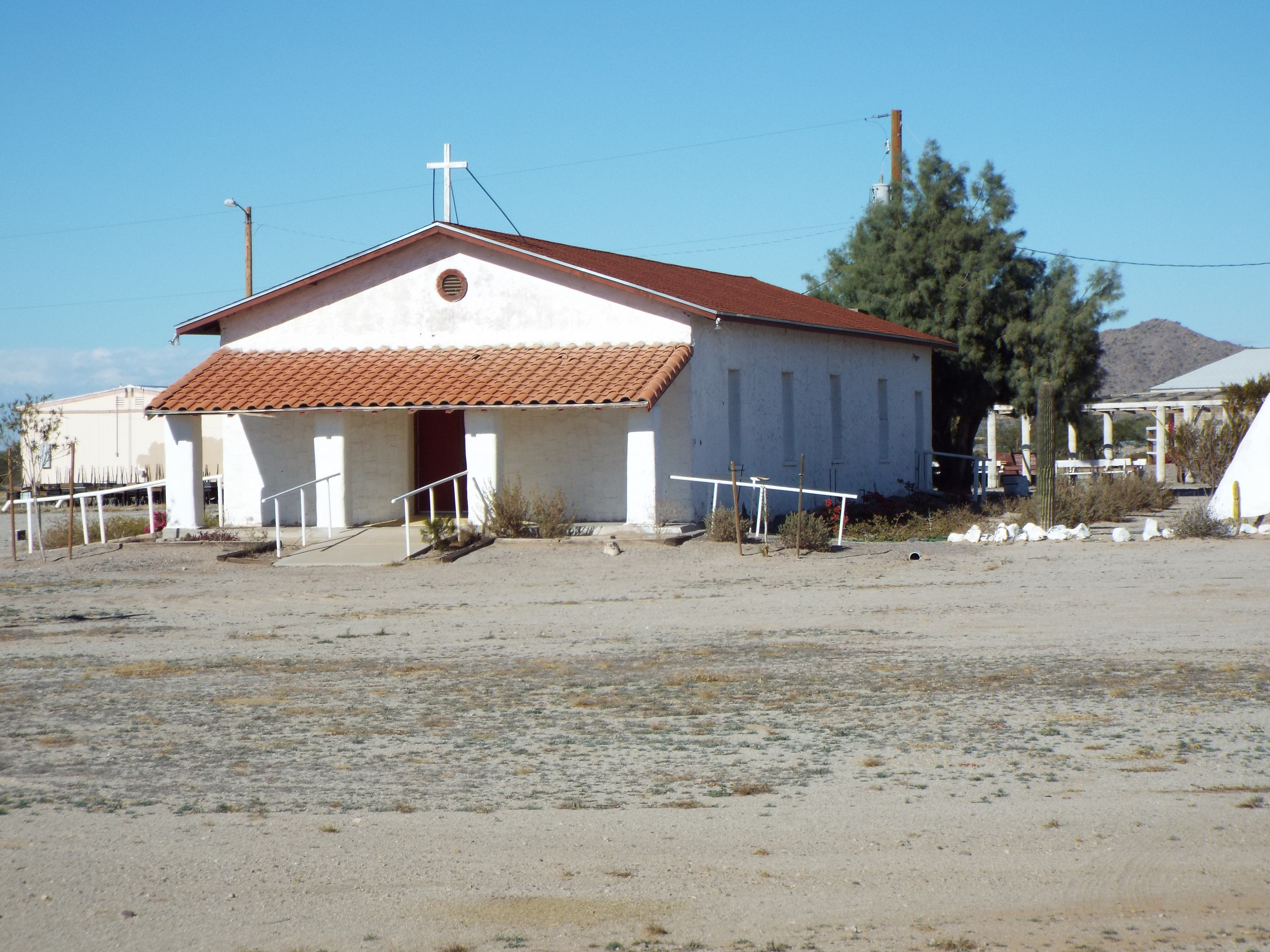
Saint Anne Catholic Church Mission
