= List of places in Arizona (S) =

This is a list of cities, towns, unincorporated communities, counties, and other places in the U.S. state of Arizona, which start with the letter S. This list is derived from the Geographic Names Information System, which has numerous errors, so it also includes many ghost towns and historical places that are not necessarily communities or actual populated places. This list also includes information on the number and names of counties in which the place lies, its lower and upper ZIP code bounds, if applicable, its U.S. Geological Survey (USGS) reference number(s) (called the GNIS), class as designated by the USGS, and incorporated community located in (if applicable).

== S–Sa ==
Name of place	Number of counties	Principal county	GNIS #(s)	Class	Located in	ZIP code	
Name of place	Number of counties	Principal county	GNIS #(s)	Class	Located in	Lower	Upper
Sacate	1	Pinal County	25339	Populated Place		85221	
Sacate Village	1	Pinal County	2612142	CDP			
Sacaton	1	Pinal County	2409225	CDP		85247	
Sacaton Flats	1	Pinal County	24593	Populated Place		85247	
Sacaton Flats Village	1	Pinal County	2612143	CDP		85247	
Saddle Brooke	1	Pinal County	2558098	Populated Place			
Saddlebrooke	1	Pinal County	2582857	CDP			
Safford	1	Graham County	2411753	Civil (city)		85546	
Sahuarita	1	Pima County	2412592	Civil (town)		85629	
Sahuarita Heights	1	Pima County	37508	Populated Place			
Saint David	1	Cochise County	2409227	CDP		85630	
Saint Johns	1	Apache County	2411761	Civil (city)		85936	
Saint Johns CDP	1	Maricopa County	2612144	CDP			
St. Michaels	1	Apache County	2409230	CDP		86511	
Salado	1	Apache County	10730	Populated Place		85936	
Salina	1	Apache County	10734	Populated Place		86503	
Salome	1	La Paz County	2409240	CDP		85348	
Salt River Indian Reservation	1	Maricopa County	37072	Civil (Indian Reservation)		85257	
San Carlos	1	Gila County	2409250	CDP		85550	
San Carlos Apache Indian Reservation	3	Gila County	24000	Civil (Indian Reservation)		85550	
Sanchez	1	Graham County	10866	Populated Place			
Sanders	1	Apache County	2582858	CDP		86512	
Sand Springs	1	Apache County	24601	Populated Place			
San Jose	1	Graham County	2582859	CDP		85546	
San Lucy Village	1	Maricopa County	10841	Populated Place		85337	
San Luis (I)	1	Pima County	10842	Populated Place		85634	
San Luis (II)	1	Pima County	24596	Populated Place			
San Luis	1	Yuma County	2411795	Civil (city)		85349	
San Manuel	1	Pinal County	2409262	CDP		85631	
San Miguel	1	Pima County	2582860	CDP		85634	
San Pedro	1	Pima County	10848	Populated Place			
San Rafael	1	Pima County	24598	Populated Place			
San Simon	1	Cochise County	2582861	CDP		85632	
Santa Claus	1	Mohave County	24602	Populated Place			
Santa Cruz	1	Pima County	24603	Populated Place			
Santa Cruz	1	Pinal County	2612145	CDP		85339	
Santan	1	Pinal County	24606	Populated Place/CDP (Note: The USGS refers to this as an historical CDP and an active populated place, while the Census Bureau refers to it as a current CDP)		85247	
San Tan Valley	1	Maricopa County	2629370	CDP			
Santa Rosa	1	Pima County	2409281	CDP			
San Xavier	1	Pima County	10864	Populated Place		85706	
San Xavier Indian Reservation	1	Pima County	15568	Civil (Indian Reservation)		85634	
Sapano Vaya	1	Pima County	24607	Populated Place			
Sasabe	1	Pima County	10961	Populated Place		85633	
Sawmill	1	Apache County	2409289	CDP		86549	

== Sc–Sh ==
Name of place	Number of counties	Principal county	GNIS #(s)	Class	Located in	ZIP code	
Name of place	Number of counties	Principal county	GNIS #(s)	Class	Located in	Lower	Upper
Scenic	1	Mohave County	2582862	CDP			
Schuchk	1	Pima County	24608	Populated Place		85634	
Schuchuli	1	Pima County	11013	Populated Place		85634	
Scottsdale	1	Maricopa County	2411845	Civil (city)		85253	71
Seba Dalkai	1	Navajo County	2582863	CDP			
Second Mesa	1	Navajo County	2409299	CDP		86043	
Sedona	2	Coconino County	2411858	Civil (city)		86336	
Sehili	1	Gila County	2582864	CDP			
Seligman	1	Yavapai County	2409305	CDP		86337	
Sells	1	Pima County	2409306	CDP		85634	
Seneca	1	Gila County	34260	Populated Place			
Sentinel	1	Maricopa County	11083	Populated Place		85352	
Seven Mile	1	Navajo County	2582865	CDP			
Shaotkam	1	Pima County	25244	Populated Place			
Sheldon	1	Greenlee County	24612	Populated Place			
Shongopovi	1	Navajo County	2408730	CDP		86043	
Shonto	1	Navajo County	2408731	CDP		86054	
Show Low	1	Navajo County	2411895	Civil (City)		85901	
Shumway	1	Navajo County	34397	Populated Place		85901	
Shungopavi	1	Navajo County	42900	Populated Place	Shongopovi		

== Si–So ==
Name of place	Number of counties	Principal county	GNIS #(s)	Class	Located in	ZIP code	
Name of place	Number of counties	Principal county	GNIS #(s)	Class	Located in	Lower	Upper
Sierra Vista	1	Cochise County	2411898	Civil (city)		85635	
Sierra Vista Southeast	1	Cochise County	2408736	CDP			
Sif Vaya	1	Pinal County	24613	Populated Place			
Signal	1	Mohave County	24614	Populated Place			
Sikul Himatk	1	Pima County	11300	Populated Place			
Sil Nakya	1	Pima County	11303	Populated Place		85634	
Silver Bell	1	Pima County	11314	Populated Place		85238	
Silverbell	1	Pima County	24616	Populated Place			
Siovi Shuatak	1	Pima County	24617	Populated Place			
Sipaulovi	1	Navajo County	11227	Populated Place	Second Mesa	86043	
Sivili Chuchg	1	Pima County	24618	Populated Place			
Sixmile Village	1	Mohave County	25311	Populated Place			
Six Shooter Canyon	1	Cochise County	2582866	CDP			
Skoksonak	1	Pima County	24619	Populated Place			
Skull Valley	1	Yavapai County	34495	Populated Place		86338	
Smelter Town	1	Pinal County	40431	Populated Place			
Smoke Signal	1	Navajo County	11477	Populated Place		86503	
Snaketown	1	Pinal County	24621	Populated Place			
Snowflake	1	Navajo County	2413301	Civil (town)		85937	
So-Hi	1	Mohave County	2582867	CDP			
Soldier Camp	1	Pima County	34614	Populated Place			
Solomon	1	Graham County	2582868	CDP		85551	
Sombrero Butte	1	Pinal County	24622	Populated Place			
Somerton	1	Yuma County	2411927	Civil (city)		85350	
Sonoita	1	Santa Cruz County	2408756	CDP		85637	
Sonora	1	Pinal County	11551	Populated Place			
South Bisbee	1	Cochise County	11573	Populated Place		85603	
South Komelik	1	Pima County	2582869	CDP			
South Santan	1	Pinal County	24624	Populated Place			
South Tucson	1	Pima County	2411943	Civil (city)		85713	

== Sp–St ==
Name of place	Number of counties	Principal county	GNIS #(s)	Class	Located in	ZIP code	
Name of place	Number of counties	Principal county	GNIS #(s)	Class	Located in	Lower	Upper
Springerville	1	Apache County	2413323	Civil (town)		85938	
Spring Valley	1	Yavapai County	2408795	CDP		86333	
Stanfield	1	Pinal County	2409993	CDP		85272	
Stan Shuatuk	1	Pima County	24625	Populated Place			
Stanton	1	Yavapai County	24626	Populated Place		85332	
Stanwix	1	Maricopa County	24627	Populated Place			
Stargo	1	Greenlee County	34800	Populated Place		85540	
Star Valley	1	Gila County	2413328	Civil (town)		85541	
Steamboat	1	Apache County	2409999	CDP			
Steamboat Canyon	1	Apache County	11804	Populated Place	Steamboat	86505	
Stoa Pitk	1	Pima County	11846	Populated Place			
Stoneman Lake	1	Coconino County	34873	Populated Place		86024	
Stotonic	1	Pinal County	25340	Populated Place			
Stotonic Village	1	Pinal County	2612146	CDP			
Stotonyak	1	Pima County		Populated Place			
Stoval	1	Yuma County	24631	Populated Place			
Strawberry	1	Gila County	2410012	CDP		85544	
Strayhorse	1	Greenlee County	34896	Populated Place			

== Su–Sz ==
Name of place	Number of counties	Principal county	GNIS #(s)	Class	Located in	ZIP code	
Name of place	Number of counties	Principal county	GNIS #(s)	Class	Located in	Lower	Upper
Summerhaven	1	Pima County	2582870	CDP			
Summit	1	Pima County	2410018	CDP			
Sun City	1	Maricopa County	2410022	CDP		85351	75
Sun City West	1	Maricopa County	2410024	CDP		85375	
Sundad	1	Maricopa County	11956	Populated Place			
Sunflower	1	Maricopa County	34951	Populated Place		85201	
Sunizona	1	Cochise County	2582871	CDP		85625	
Sun Lakes	1	Maricopa County	2410025	CDP		85224	
Sunnyside	1	Cochise County	34962	Populated Place			
Sunnyslope	1	Maricopa County	11974	Populated Place	Phoenix	85020	
Sunset	1	Graham County	24634	Populated Place		85643	
Sun Valley	1	Navajo County	2582872	CDP		86029	
Sunwest	1	La Paz County	2582873	CDP			
Supai	1	Coconino County	2410036	CDP		86435	
Superior	1	Pinal County	2413353	Civil (town)		85273	
Surprise	1	Maricopa County	2412016	Civil (City)		85374	
Swansea	1	La Paz County	24636	Populated Place			
Sweetwater	1	Pima County	12049	Populated Place			
Sweetwater	3	Pinal County	24637	Populated Place			
Sweet Water Village	3	Pinal County	2612147	CDP			
Swift Trail Junction	1	Graham County	2410041	CDP		85546	
