= Canyon Creek =

Canyon Creek may refer to:

== Inhabited places ==
=== Canada ===
- Canyon Creek, Alberta, Canada

=== United States ===
- Canyon Creek, Montana
- Canyon Creek, Austin, Texas, a neighborhood
- Canyon Creek, Hood County, Texas, a census-designated place
- Canyon Creek, Washington, a census-designated place in Snohomish County

== Rivers and streams ==
- Canyon Creek (Arizona)
- Canyon Creek (Salt River tributary), Arizona
- Canyon Creek (California)
- Canyon Creek (Teton River), a creek in Idaho
- Canyon Creek (Montana), a stream in Flathead County, Montana
