= Salt River (Arizona) =

River in Gila and Maricopa counties in Arizona, United States

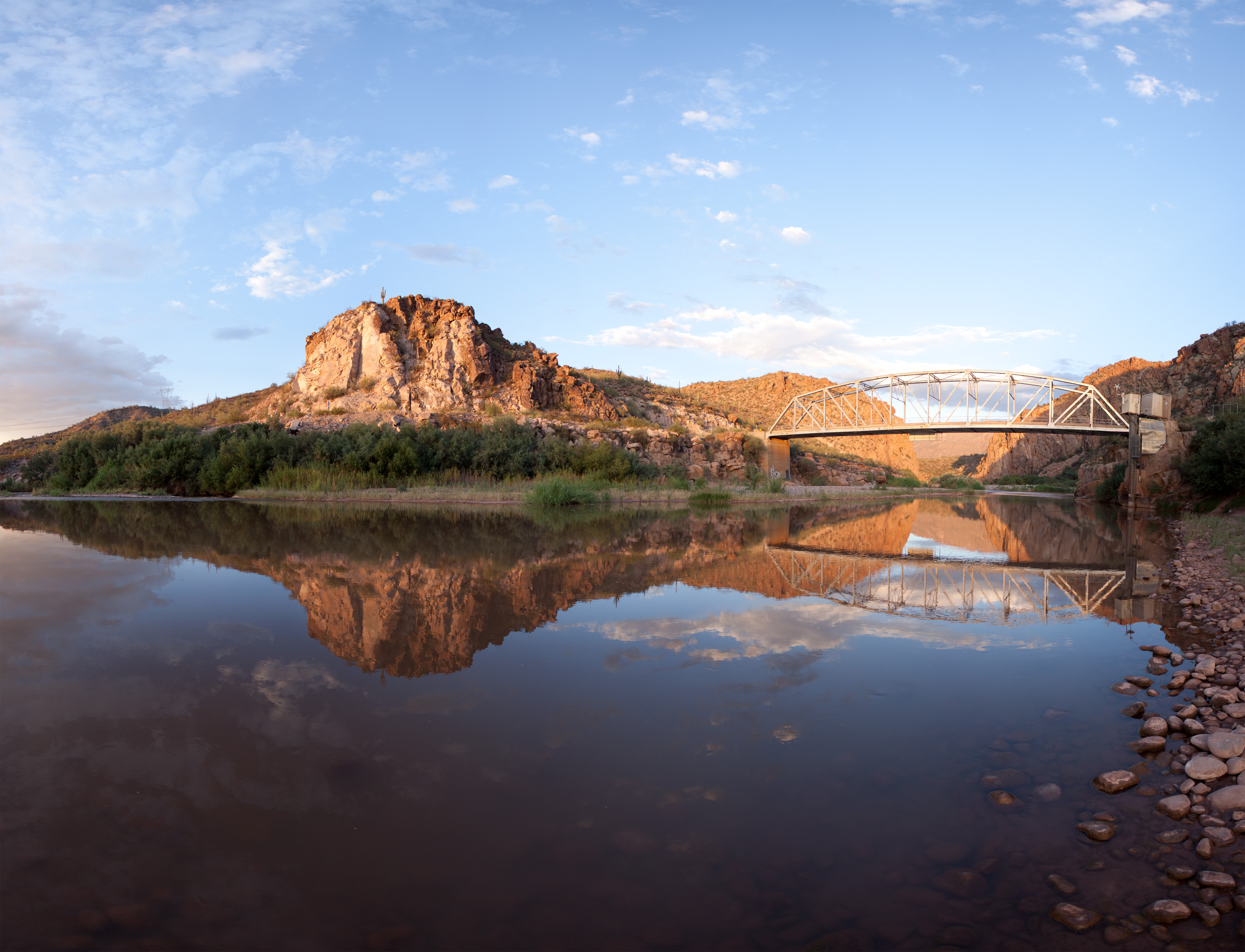
- Lower Salt River, near the Phoenix metropolitan area

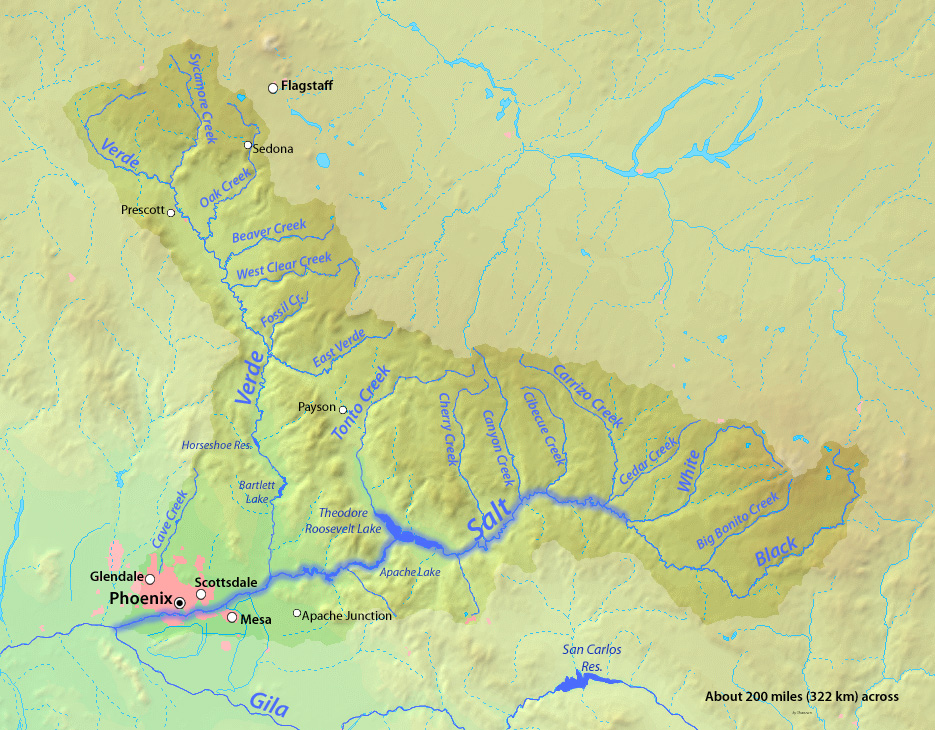
- Map of the Salt River watershed

Location
- Country: United States
- State: Arizona
- Counties: Gila & Maricopa

Physical characteristics
- Source: Confluence of White and Black Rivers
  - location: White Mountains, Arizona
  - coordinates: 33°44′20″N 110°13′32″W
  - elevation: 4,222 ft (1,287 m)
- Mouth: Gila River
  - location: Phoenix
  - coordinates: 33°22′52″N 112°18′47″W
  - elevation: 928 ft (283 m)
- Length: 200 mi (320 km)
- Basin size: 13,700 sq mi (35,000 km^{2})
- Discharge
  - location: USGS gage 09498500, Salt River near Roosevelt, AZ
  - average: 879 cu ft/s (24.9 m^{3}/s)
  - minimum: 59 cu ft/s (1.7 m^{3}/s)
  - maximum: 143,000 cu ft/s (4,000 m^{3}/s)

The Salt River (Spanish: Río Salado, O'odham [Pima]: Onk Akimel, Yavapai: Hakanyacha or Hakathi:, Maricopa language: Va Shly'ay) is a river in Gila and Maricopa counties in Arizona, United States, that is the largest tributary of the Gila River. The river is about 200 miles (320 km) long. Its drainage basin covers about 13,700 square miles (35,000 km^{2}). The longest of the Salt River's many tributaries is the 195-mile (314 km) Verde River. The Salt's headwaters tributaries, the Black River and East Fork, increase the river's total length to about 300 miles (480 km). The name Salt River comes from the river's course over large salt deposits shortly after the merging of the White and Black Rivers.

== Variant names ==
According to the Geographic Names Information System, the Salt River has also been known as:

- Assumption
- Black River
- Blau Fluss
- Blue River
- Rio Asuncion
- Rio Azulrio de Lasrio
- Rio de la Asuncion
- Rio de las Balsas
- River of the Rafts
- Salada
- Salinas
- Rio Salado

== Course ==
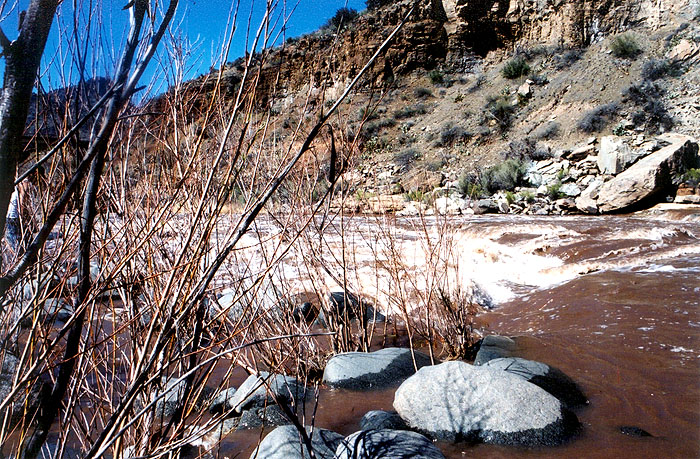
The Salt River as seen in Salt River Canyon, 2004

The Salt River is formed by the confluence of the White River and the Black River in the White Mountains of eastern Gila County. The White and Black rivers, and other tributaries of the upper Salt River, drain the region between the Mogollon Rim in the north and the Natanes Mountains and Natanes Plateau to the east and south. Tributaries of the Salt River also drain the Sierra Ancha and Mazatzal Mountains. The White and Black rivers drain the White Mountains in the Fort Apache Indian Reservation. Together the two rivers drain an area of about 1,900 square miles (4,900 km^{2}). The Salt River, along with the Black River, forms the boundary between the Fort Apache Indian Reservation to the north and the San Carlos Apache Indian Reservation to the south.

The Salt River is fed by numerous perennial streams that start as springs and seeps along the Mogollon Rim and in the White Mountains. The Salt River is perennial from its tributary headwaters to Granite Reef Diversion Dam near Mesa.

From the Black and White confluence, the Salt River flows generally west and southwest. It is joined by Carrizo Creek, a 25-mile (40 km) perennial stream, and then flows through the Salt River Canyon. Cibecue Creek, a 36-mile (58 km) perennial stream, joins the river in the canyon, flowing from the north through the Fort Apache Reservation. Between Carrizo and Cibecue creeks, the Salt River becomes the boundary between the Tonto National Forest on the south and the Fort Apache Reservation on the north. Another perennial stream joins from the north, 46-mile (74 km) long Canyon Creek, followed by Cherry Creek. Just downstream from the Salt's confluence with Medicine Creek, a portion of the Tonto National Forest is designated the Salt River Canyon Wilderness. The Salt River forms the northern and western boundary of the wilderness for several miles, after which the national forest and wilderness occupy both sides of the river.

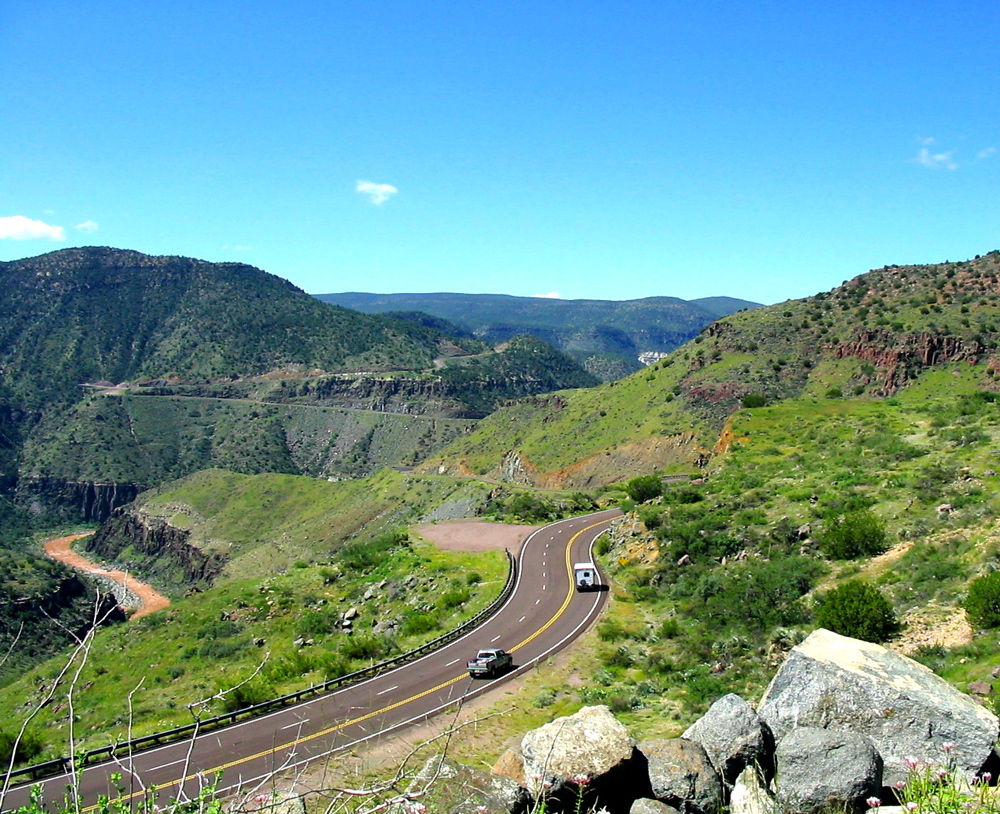
Salt River alongside State Route 77, September 2006

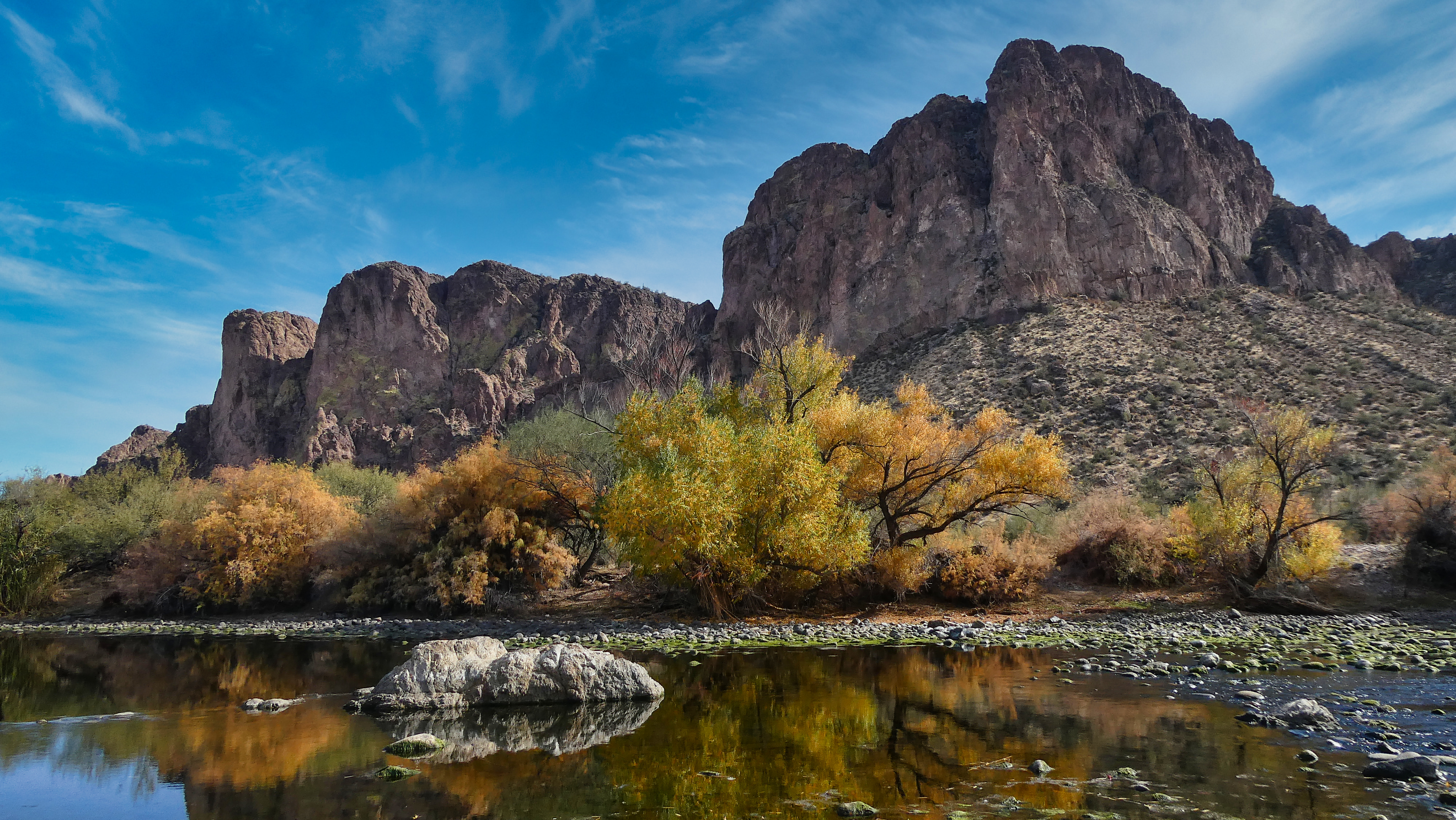
Rio Salado south of Stewart Mountain Dam

Continuing its westward course, the Salt River is joined by Pinal Creek from the south, just before leaving the Salt River Canyon Wilderness. The river continues to flow through the Tonto National Forest until leaving the mountains near Mesa. Below the Pinal Creek confluence, the Salt River enters Theodore Roosevelt Lake, the first of four reservoirs on the river. Tonto Creek joins the Salt River in Theodore Roosevelt Lake. Below Theodore Roosevelt Dam, the Salt River passes through the canyon between the Mazatzal Mountains and the Superstition Mountains and is impounded by Horse Mesa Dam (forming Apache Lake) then Mormon Flat Dam (forming Canyon Lake) then Stewart Mountain Dam (forming Saguaro Lake). These four reservoirs are part of the Salt River Project. The water is used by the Phoenix metropolitan area for municipal, industrial, and agricultural purposes. The storage capacity of the reservoirs is 2,910,200 acre-feet (3.5897×10^{9} m^{3}) for Roosevelt, 245,100 acre-feet (302,300,000 m^{3}) for Apache, 57,900 acre-feet (71,400,000 m^{3}) for Canyon, and 69,800 acre-feet (86,100,000 m^{3}) for Saguaro.

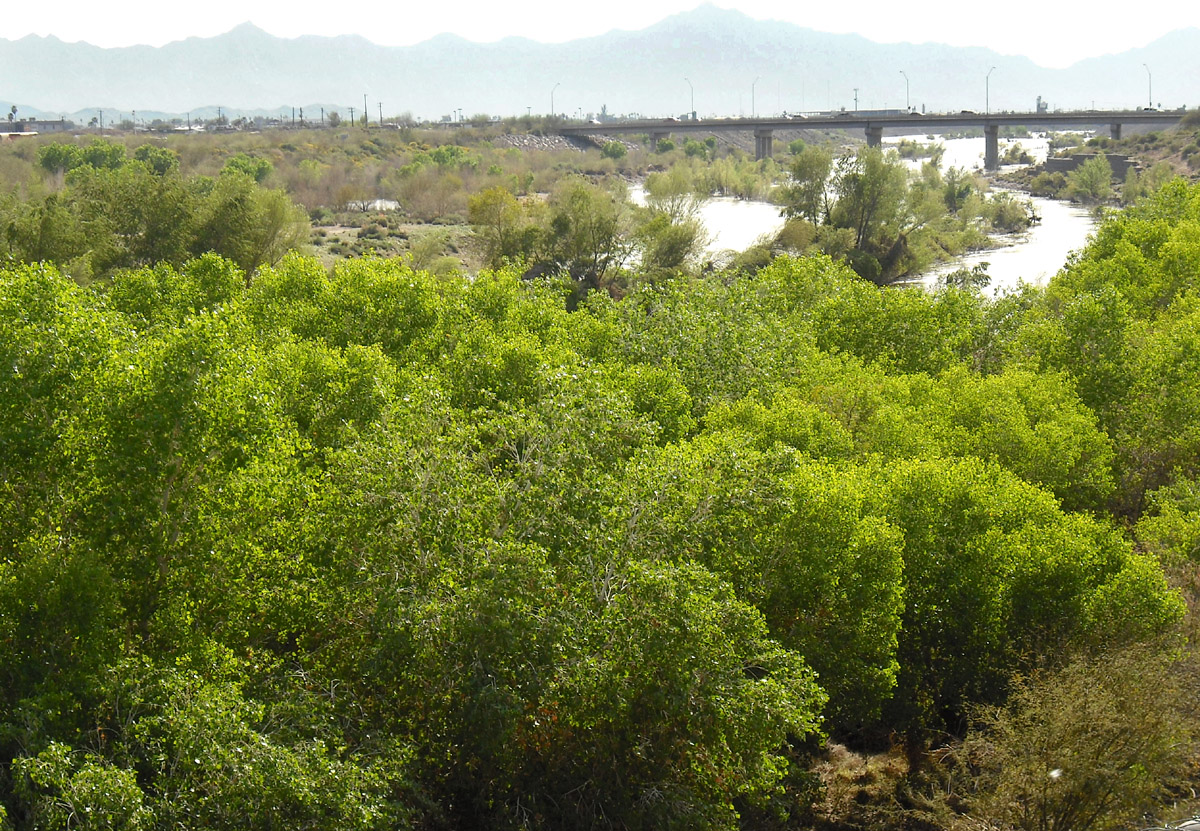
Salt River passing below the Central Avenue Bridge in southern Phoenix after winter rains, March 2010

As the Salt River passes through its reservoirs, it flows by the Four Peaks Wilderness, near the Four Peaks. A few miles downstream of Stewart Mountain Dam, the last of the four Salt River Project dams, the Verde River joins the Salt from the north. Fountain Hills is located a few miles to the northwest. The Salt River Pima-Maricopa Indian Community is located near the Verde–Salt confluence. The Tonto National Forest ends a couple miles below the Verde River confluence, and the Salt River enters the eastern edge of the greater Phoenix metropolitan area. Less than 1/2 mile (0.80 km) from the national forest boundary, the Granite Reef Diversion Dam diverts all remaining water in the Salt River into the Arizona Canal and Southern Canal, which deliver drinking and irrigation water to much of the Phoenix metropolitan area. The dam and canals are part of the Salt River Project.

Below the diversion dam, the bed of the Salt River is dry, except following rain or upstream runoff. The USGS stream gage at 51st Avenue, Phoenix, records no flow at all on many days—in 2009, for example, there was no flow for most of the year, except during parts of February and March when the river's discharge reached an average of 87 cubic feet per second (2.5 m^{3}/s). The diversion capacity at Granite Reef Diversion Dam is 3,600 cubic feet per second (100 m^{3}/s), with 2,000 cubic feet per second (57 m^{3}/s) for the Arizona Canal, and 1,600 cubic feet per second (45 m^{3}/s) for the Southern Canal.

Below Granite Reef Dam, the Salt River leaves the mountains and flows past the cities of Mesa, Tempe, and Scottsdale, then south of downtown Phoenix, where it passes north of South Mountain Park. With the exception of Tempe Town Lake, the riverbed winding through the cities is usually dry, except when heavy rains upstream force Stewart Mountain Dam to release more water than can be diverted at Granite Reef Dam. The Salt River joins the Gila on the southwestern edge of Phoenix, approximately 15 miles (24 km) from the center of the city. Monument Hill overlooks the confluence of the two rivers and is the site of the Initial Survey point for Arizona, the Gila and Salt River Meridian.

On November 2, 2026 2:00 AM local time, USGS river gauge 09498500 on the Salt river near Roosevelt, Arizona registered a maximum crest of 30.98 feet (9.44m) with a peak flow of 143,000 cubic feet per second. Potentially matching or even slightly beating the previous record from 1993.

=== River modifications ===
The Salt River formerly flowed through its entire course year-round. However, the free-flowing river would frequently flood, including a massive flood in 1891. This flood, as well as others, led to the construction of several dams, beginning with the Theodore Roosevelt Dam, have caused the river to become intermittent in many parts.

Despite the dry river bed, or arroyo, dangerous flash floods occasionally occur, especially during monsoon storms in late July and early August. Flood waters can wash out roads. Bridges have been damaged, notably in 1980, 1993, and 2005. The natural flow of the Salt is 2,570 cubic feet per second (73 m^{3}/s) at its mouth. However, except after rainfall, the Salt is dry or a small stream below Granite Reef Dam. The river was formerly navigable throughout its course by small craft. The river is still navigable in the majority of the area where it still carries water.

The river was used for irrigation by the pre-Columbian Hohokam culture, by later Native Americans, and by early Euro-American settlers in the 19th century. It currently provides a major source of irrigation and drinking water for Phoenix and surrounding communities through the Salt River Project. The river's water is distributed over more than 1,000 miles (1,600 km) of irrigation canals, used primarily for the growing of cotton, alfalfa, fruit, and vegetables.

== Ecology ==
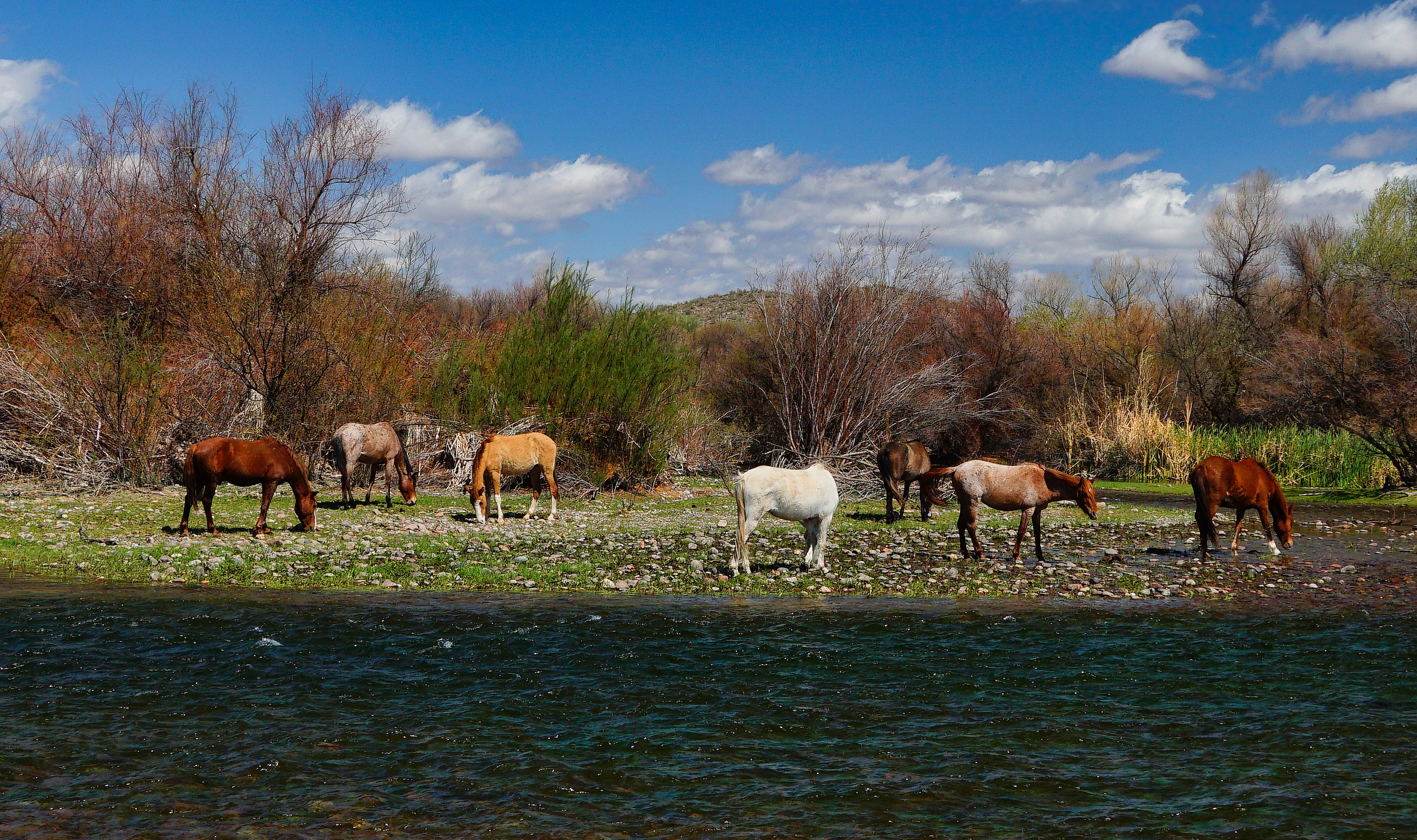
Feral horses grazing on the banks of the Salt River.

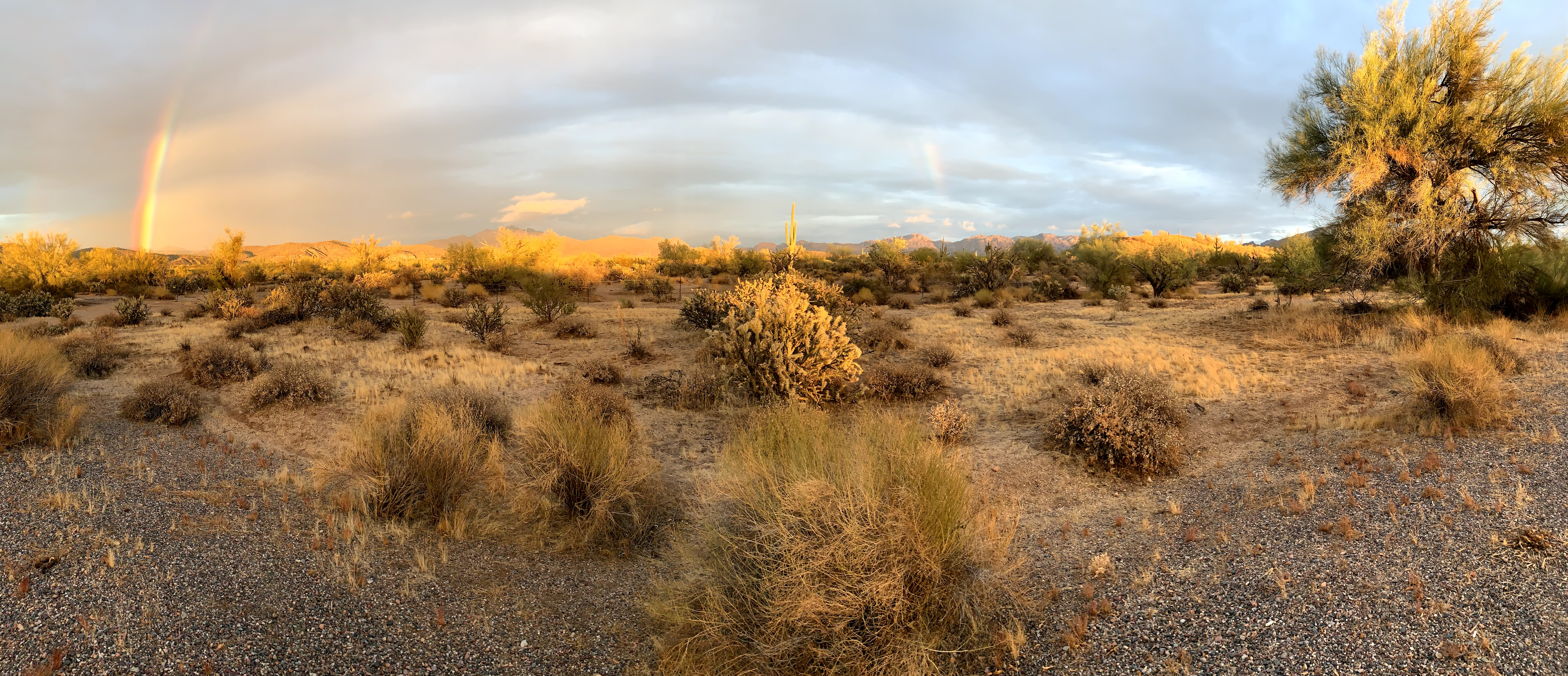
Tonto National Forest's Lower Salt River area site shortly after rain

North American beavers (Castor canadensis) historically flourished on the river. In an historical account, George C. Yount, a fur trapper with the Pattie expedition, wrote on 1 February 1863, "...we began to ascend the Black River [Salt River]... We found it to abound with beavers... We followed up this stream to where it forks in the mountains; that is to say, about 80 miles from its mouth."

In 2022, fish kill was caused in three lakes by golden algae.

The feral horses of the Salt River have caused much damage in the region.

== Water quality ==
There are turbidity problems along many stream reaches in Salt River's watershed; these are related to rangeland management, recreation, mining, sand and gravel operations, and other sources. High levels of fecal coliform bacteria and ammonia have been reported for Carrizo Creek and the White River.

== History ==
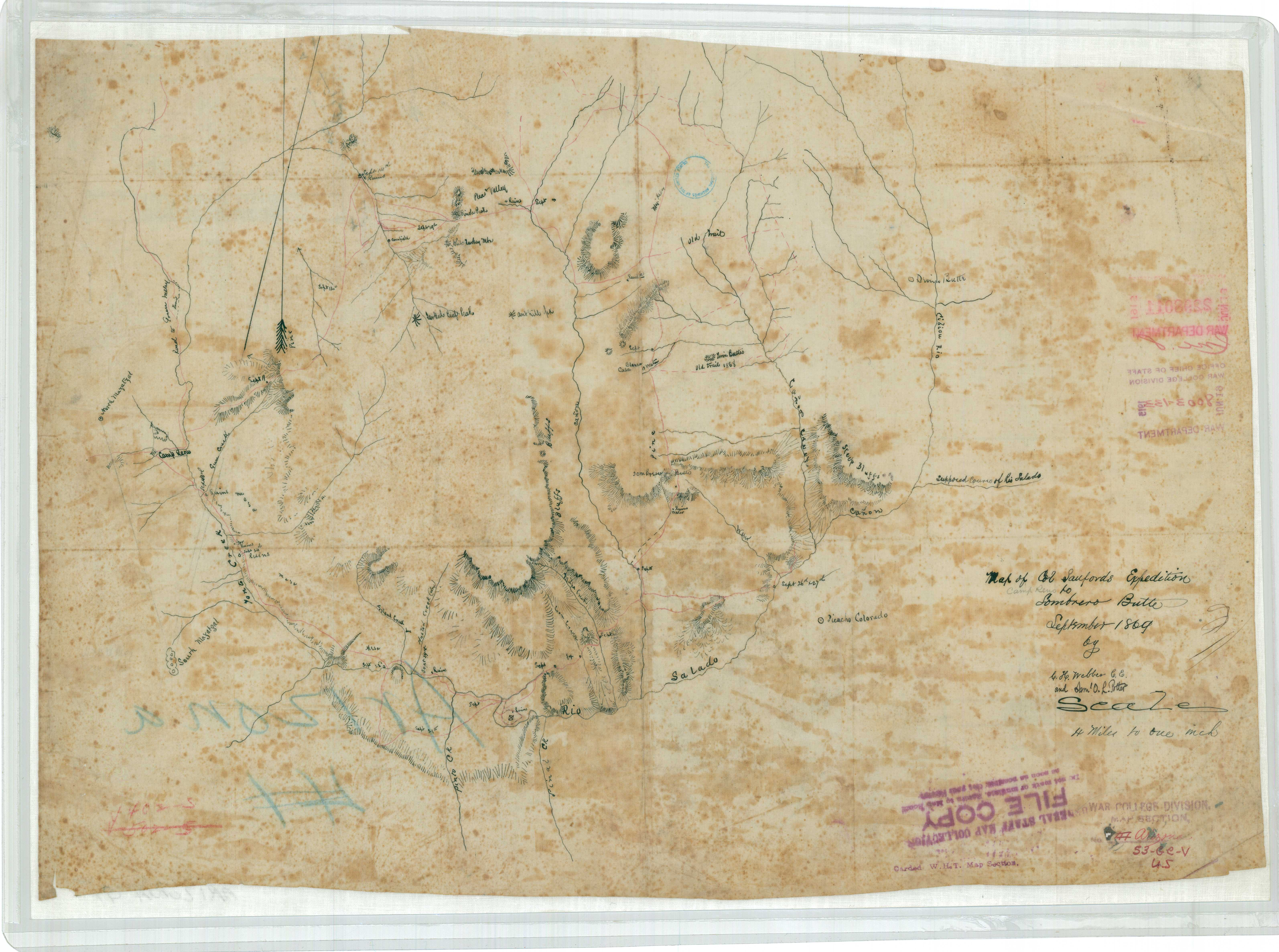
"Map of Colonel Sanford's Expedition to Sombrero Butte" in September 1869 showing Río Saludo (NAID 103396422)

In ancient times, the river was home to the Salado culture and the Hohokam culture. The Akimel O'odham, also known as the Pima people, lived along the Salt River and dug canals, using irrigation to provide water to their villages and farms in the arid environment. The river was known to the authorities of New Spain as the Río Salado. The United States government recognized the territory of the Pima people by way of executive order signed by President Rutherford B. Hayes. A subsequent executive order also signed by President Hayes reduced the size of the Salt River portion of the reserve from approximately 680,000 acres to 46,627 acres. Today the Salt River Pima–Maricopa Indian Community live alongside the bank of the Salt River maintaining their traditions and way of life from before European colonization.

== Recreation ==
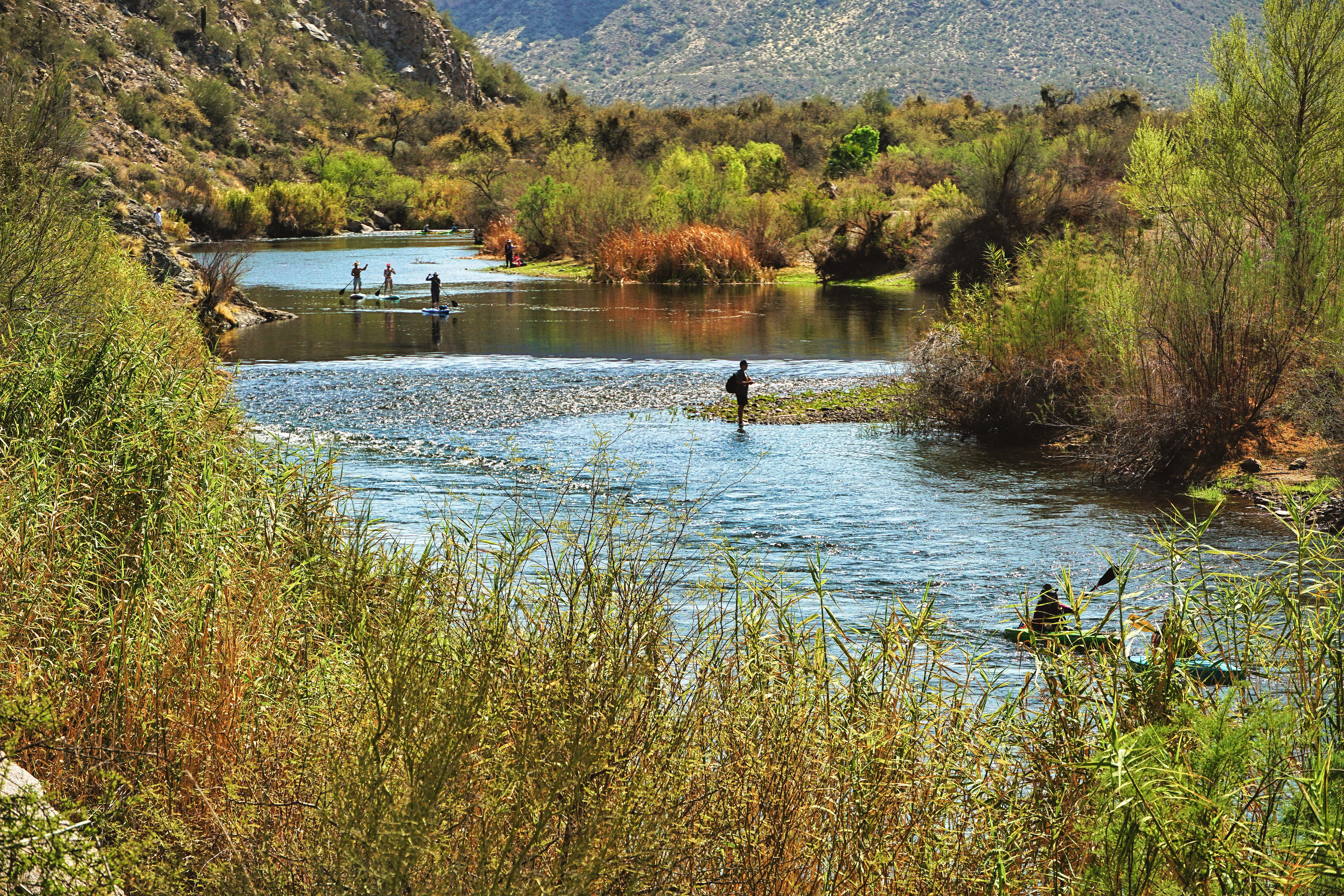
Recreation on the Rio Salado

=== Boating facilities ===
Cherry Creek to Roosevelt Lake: Paved, gravel and trail access, live bait fish (restrictions in effect), no motors allowed, primitive parking area, camping allowed, area mostly inaccessible.

Below Saguaro Lake: Paved and dirt access, live bait fish, swimming, no motors allowed, parking area, tables, restrooms, camping allowed. Several camp and picnic areas, drained in winter.

The above facilities are maintained by the Tonto National Forest.

Tempe Boat Rentals at Tempe Town Lake: Small passenger boats including kayaks, pedal boats, electric powered pontoons and fishing boats. This is an independent contractor and not managed by the City of Tempe.

=== Fish species ===
Cherry Creek to Roosevelt Lake (15 fishable miles)
largemouth bass, smallmouth bass, sunfish, channel catfish, flathead catfish, carp

Below Saguaro Lake (11 fishable miles)
rainbow trout, largemouth bass, smallmouth bass, yellow bass, crappie, sunfish, channel catfish, flathead catfish, blue catfish, yellow perch, walleye, tilapia, black crappie, carp, bullfrogs, desert sucker, sturgeon

== See also ==
- List of rivers of Arizona
- List of tributaries of the Colorado River
- Skeleton Cave (Arizona)
- Salt River Pima–Maricopa Indian Community
