= Phoenix flood of 1891 =

Flood of the Salt River in Arizona

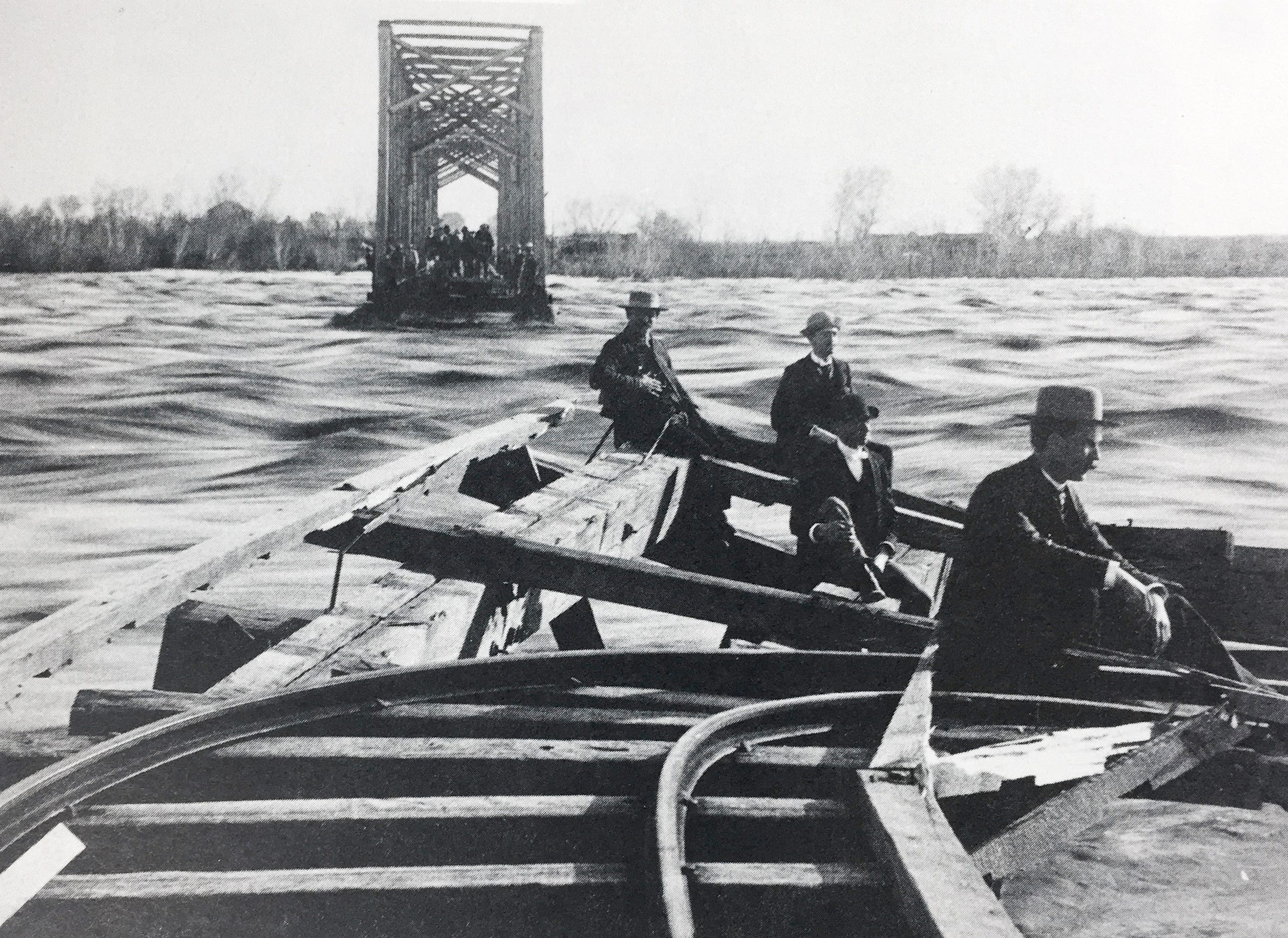
- Damage to a railroad bridge over the Salt River in Tempe, Arizona during the flood
- Date: February 19–26, 1891
- Location: Phoenix, Arizona and the surrounding Salt River Valley
- Deaths: 0
- Property damage: $125,000 (equivalent to $4,479,167 in 2025)

The Phoenix flood of 1891 was the largest recorded flood of the Salt River, occurring from February 19 to February 26. It affected most of the Salt River Valley in Maricopa County, Arizona, and caused damaged to the cities of Phoenix, Tempe, and Mesa. The river swelled to over 3 miles wide and caused significant damage, including the destruction of a railroad bridge. The flood was a major precursor to the formation of the Salt River Project.

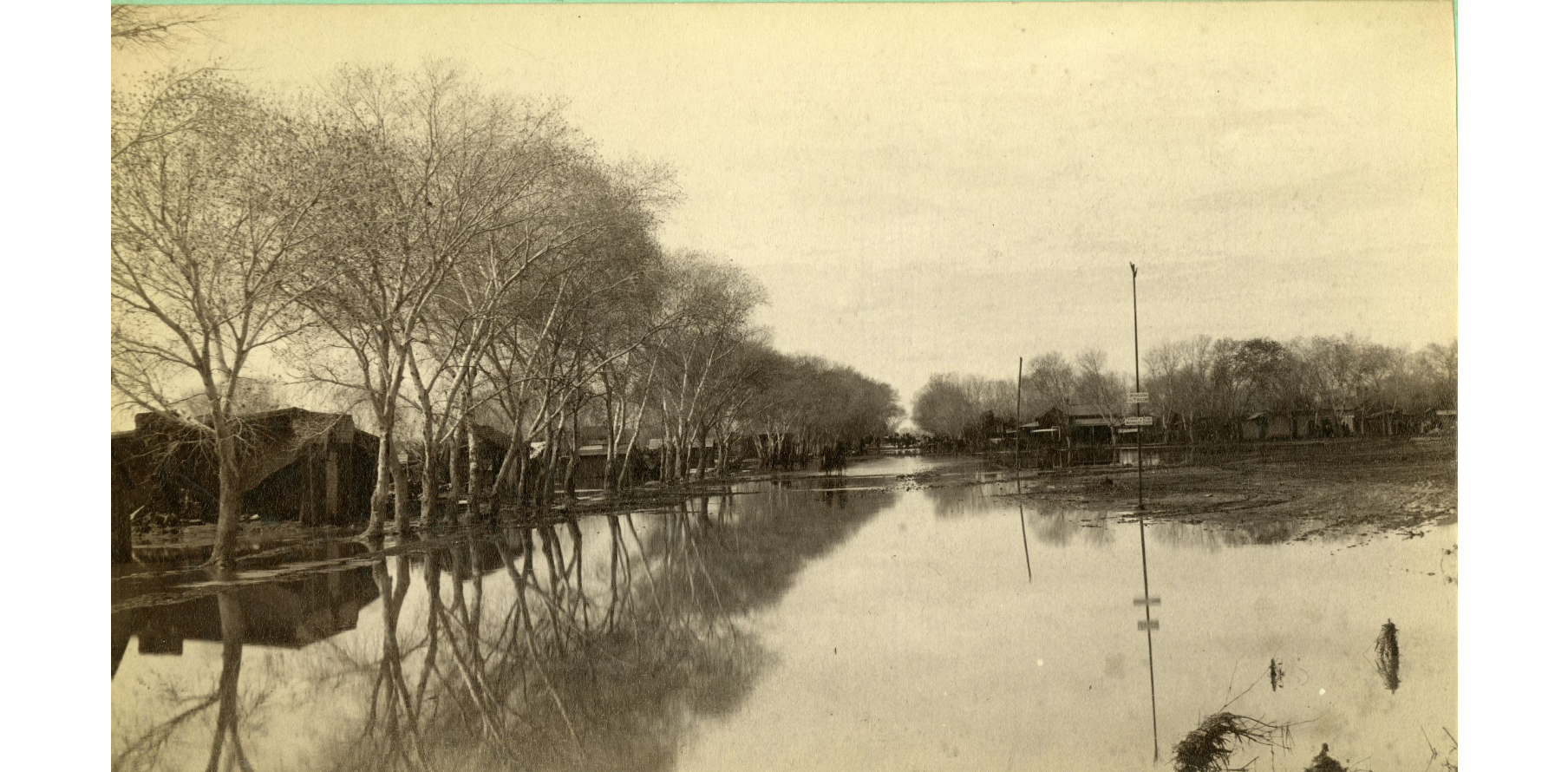
View of a flooded Phoenix neighborhood in February 1891
