= Tropical Depression Nineteen-E (2018) =

Pacific tropical depression in 2018

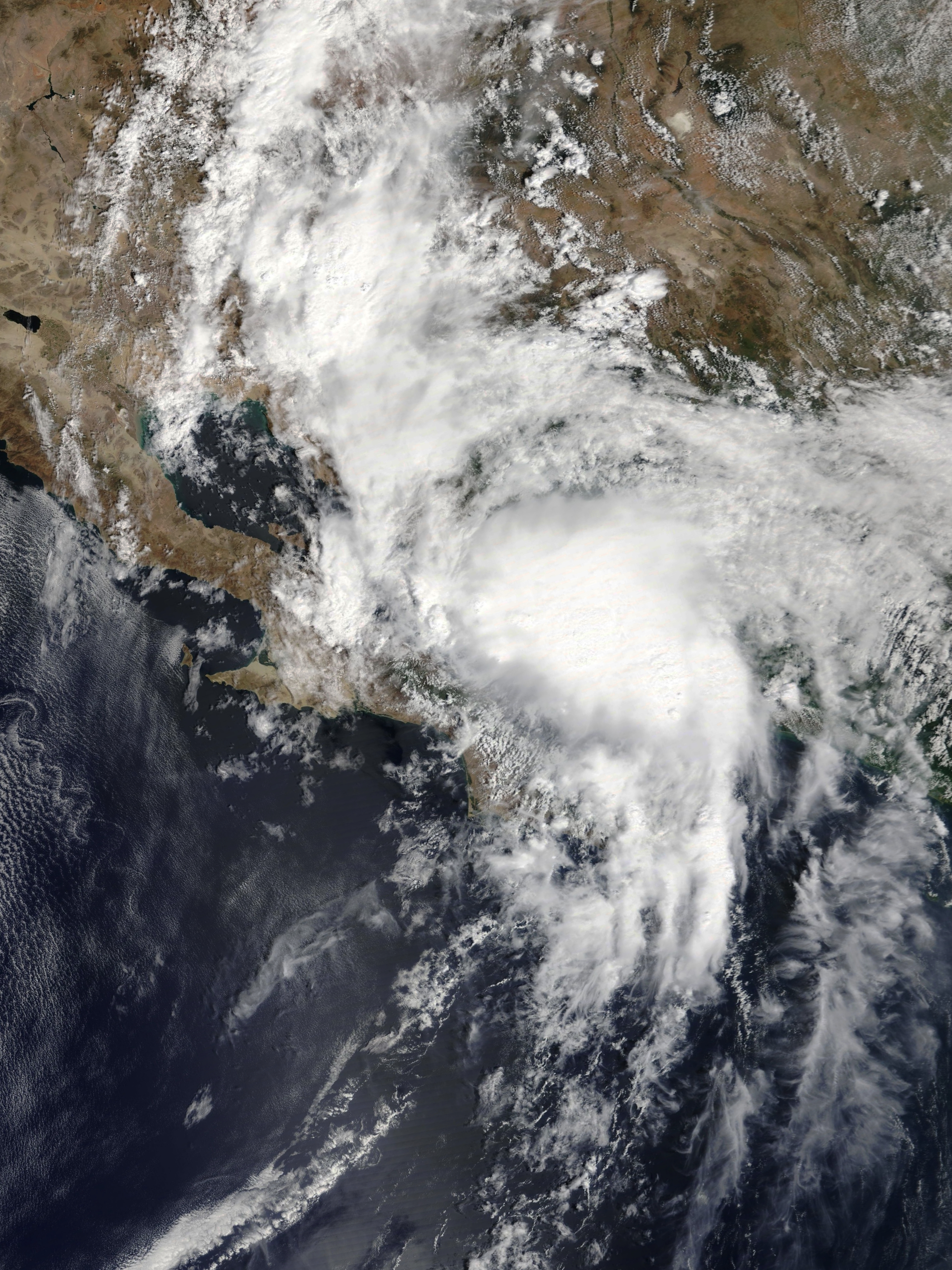
- Nineteen-E making landfall in Baja California Sur on September 19

Meteorological history
- Formed: September 19, 2018
- Dissipated: September 20, 2018

Tropical depression
- 1-minute sustained (SSHWS/NWS)
- Highest winds: 35 mph (55 km/h)
- Lowest pressure: 1002 mbar (hPa); 29.59 inHg

Overall effects
- Fatalities: 16 total
- Damage: $474 million (2018 USD)
- Areas affected: Baja California Sur, Northwestern Mexico, Arizona, New Mexico, Texas, Oklahoma, Arkansas
- IBTrACS /
- Part of the 2018 Pacific hurricane season

Tropical Depression Nineteen-E was a weak yet costly tropical cyclone that caused significant flooding throughout Northwestern Mexico and several states within the United States in September 2018. The storm was also the first known tropical cyclone to form over the Gulf of California. Nineteen-E originated from a tropical wave that left the west coast of Africa on August 29 to 30. It continued westward, crossed over Central America, and entered the northeastern Pacific Ocean by September 7. It then meandered to the southwest of Mexico for the next several days as it interacted with a mid-to-upper level trough. The National Hurricane Center (NHC) continued to track the disturbance for the next several days as it traveled northward. A surface trough developed over the Baja California peninsula on September 18. Despite disorganization and having close proximity to land, the disturbance developed into a tropical depression in the Gulf of California on September 19, after having developed a circulation center and more concentrated convection. The system peaked with maximum sustained winds of 35 mph (55 km/h) and a minimum central pressure of 1002 mbar (29.59 inHg).

One day after forming, the depression quickly deteriorated and dissipated after making landfall in Sonora. Overall, the depression affected eleven Mexican states, with torrential rainfall and flooding ensuing in Baja California Sur, Sinaloa, and Sonora. Thirteen individuals were killed in Chihuahua, Sinaloa, and Sonora, and over $40 million (2018 USD) in agricultural losses were recorded. Excessive rainfall led to the inundation of at least 300,000 structures in Sinaloa. Total damage in Sonora and Sinaloa reached $224 million. Two children died in Sinaloa months after the storm as a result of unrepaired damage. Remnant moisture from Nineteen-E led to severe flooding within the U.S. states of Arizona, Texas, Oklahoma, and Arkansas and the death of one person. Damage estimates totaled about $250 million (USD) in the aforementioned states. Minor damage was also reported in New Mexico.

== Meteorological history ==
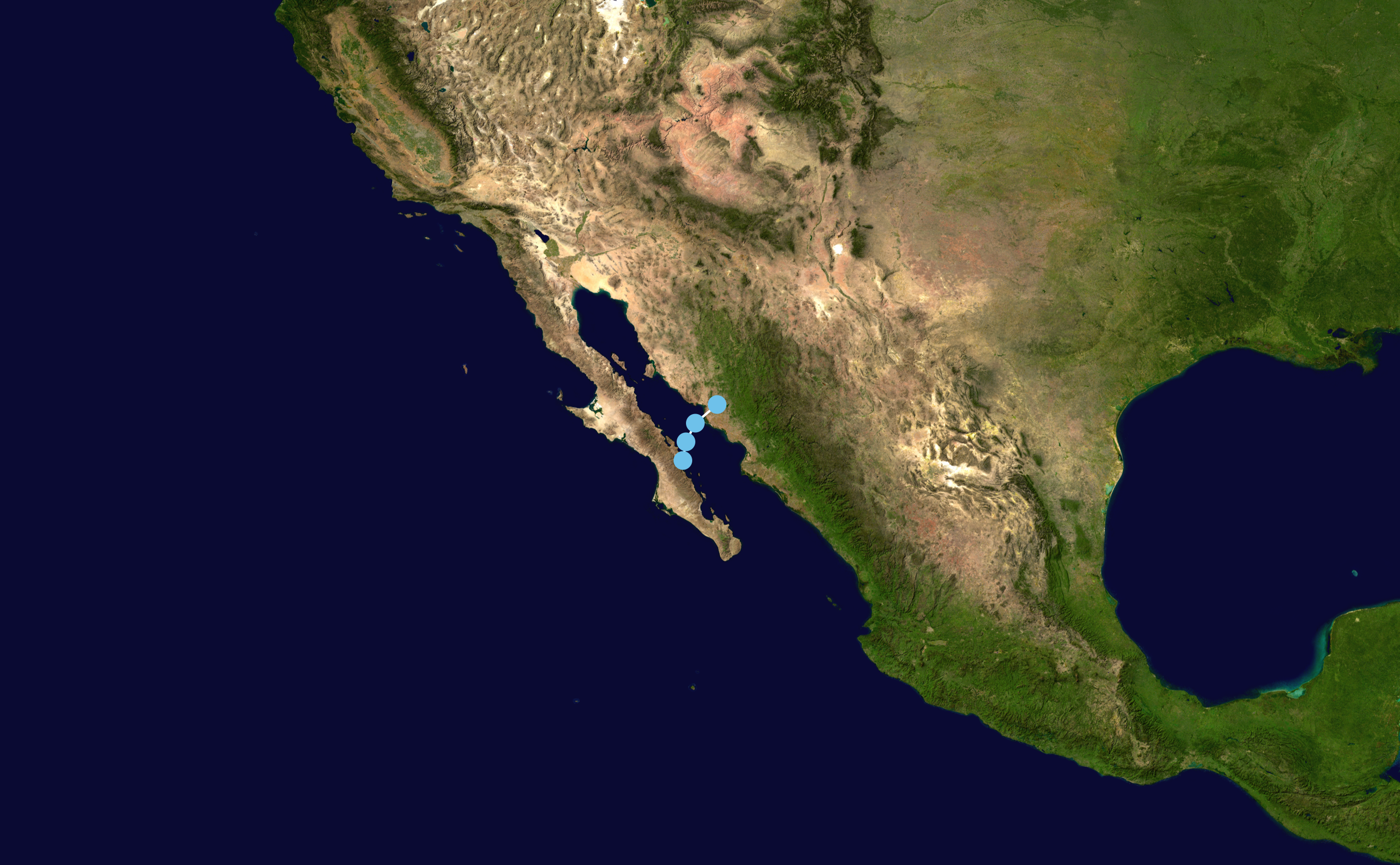
Map plotting the storm's track and intensity, according to the Saffir–Simpson scale Map key Saffir–Simpson scale Tropical depression (≤38 mph, ≤62 km/h) Tropical storm (39–73 mph, 63–118 km/h) Category 1 (74–95 mph, 119–153 km/h) Category 2 (96–110 mph, 154–177 km/h) Category 3 (111–129 mph, 178–208 km/h) Category 4 (130–156 mph, 209–251 km/h) Category 5 (≥157 mph, ≥252 km/h) Unknown Storm type Tropical cyclone Subtropical cyclone Extratropical cyclone, remnant low, tropical disturbance, or monsoon depression

Tropical Depression Nineteen-E's origins can be traced back to a tropical wave that departed from the west coast of Africa between August 29 and 30. On August 31, it generated Tropical Depression Six, which would later become Hurricane Florence. The wave continued to track westward at low latitudes, leaving Florence behind in the far eastern tropical Atlantic Ocean. The wave eventually moved over Central America and crossed into the far northeastern Pacific Ocean by September 7. The wave then slowed down and leisurely moved westward, south of Mexico for the next week or so. Meanwhile, a mid-level shortwave trough dropped southward from the United States, entering Mexico on September 9. The trough continued to track southward for the next few days and a low- to mid-level low developed just south of the southern tip of the Baja California peninsula on September 12. Around that time, the NHC noted the system had the potential for future tropical development. The low moved southwestward for the next several days. The trough and a plume of moisture rushed northward towards the Baja California peninsula just as the tropical wave was arriving. An area of low pressure formed several hundred miles south of the southern coast of Mexico on September 14 at 12:00 UTC. A surface trough with a north-to-south orientation developed over Baja California Sur on September 18 with thunderstorms having developed from the deep tropics to the Gulf of California.

The disturbance moved into the Gulf of California on September 19. A circulation center and more concentrated convection formed along the trough. Despite stronger wind shear and its proximity to land, the disturbance consolidated into a tropical depression around 12:00 UTC. The genesis of Nineteen-E was unexpected, having occurred after the NHC had downgraded the 5-day formation chance to low. The NHC stated that Nineteen-E was the first tropical cyclone to have formed over the Gulf of California based on records dating back to 1949. Six hours later, the depression's maximum sustained winds peaked at 35 mph (55 km/h). Around that time, the NHC noted that banding features had become slightly more defined and an area of strong convection was present in the eastern semicircle. At 00:00 UTC on September 20, the depression's minimum central pressure decreased to 1002 mbar (29.59 inHg). Around 03:00 UTC, Nineteen-E made landfall between the cities of Ciudad Obregón and Guaymas in Sonora. After moving ashore, the rugged terrain of Sonora quickly weakened the depression. Six hours after landfall, the NHC noted that the depression's convection had taken on a more linear look and that it had lost its closed surface circulation. The NHC reported that Nineteen-E dissipated around 12:00 UTC that day. Nineteen-E's remnants continued to travel northward, while causing severe flooding in Mexico. After entering the United States, the remnants tracked eastward and drew in moisture from the Gulf of Mexico, causing flash flooding in several states.

== Impact ==
=== Mexico ===
Highest rainfall totals from Nineteen-E in Mexico and the United States
Country	State	Area	Rainfall
Mexico	Sinaloa	Ahome	15.06 in (382.5 mm)
Mexico	Sinaloa	Goritos	14.15 in (359.4 mm)
Mexico	Sinaloa	El Carrizo	10.67 in (271.0 mm)
Mexico	Sinaloa	Culiacán	10.65 in (270.4 mm)
United States	Oklahoma	Johnston County	15.81 in (401.6 mm)
United States	Oklahoma	Stonewall	15.50 in (393.7 mm)
United States	Oklahoma	Fittstown	15.04 in (382.0 mm)
United States	Oklahoma	Centrahoma	10.82 in (274.8 mm)
United States	Texas	Bonham	8.85 in (225 mm)
United States	Texas	McKinney	8.71 in (221 mm)
References for rainfall values:

Tropical Depression Nineteen-E caused flooding throughout northwestern Mexico. In total, at least eleven Mexican states were affected by the depression, with Baja California Sur, Sonora, and Sinaloa being impacted the hardest. Torrential rainfall affected the Baja California peninsula for a few days before genesis occurred on September 19 through the system's dissipation. The National Meteorological Service of Mexico reported that Baja California Sur received heavy rainfall, with totals of approximately 3–4 in (70–100 mm) and an isolated value of up to 4.88 in (124 mm) being reported in the southern portion of the state. The cyclone's quick formation over the Gulf of California, which was attributed to warmer-than-normal sea surface temperatures, left insufficient time for warnings to be issued for municipalities. On September 19, in anticipation of hazardous effects from Nineteen-E, a green alert was issued off-shore of Mexico.

On September 20, the depression made landfall in Sonora, Mexico. The torrential rains associated with the depression were the most intense to impact the state in the last decade. According to Conagua, the National Water Commission, over 8 in (200 mm) of rain fell in a 10-hour period in some locations. While most of the rainfall in Sonora came from Nineteen-E, sporadic bursts of convection unaffiliated with the depression contributed additional rainfall. At least 13 municipalities in Sinaloa received heavy rainfall, with a total of 5.5 in (140 mm) being recorded at El Cazanate. In the municipality of Nogales, more than 300 tonnes of mud, stones, and garbage were removed from roads in order to make them passable for vehicles. Additionally, two bodies were recovered by Nogales police after having been dragged across the border, into Arizona, by strong currents. Over 100 people were rescued from floods and the total number affected is estimated to be in the hundreds of thousands. Traffic on Federal Highway 15 in southern Sonora was interrupted as strong water currents flowed across the road. Authorities used social media to alert the public to stay off the highway. Additionally, 30 people were rescued from a passenger bus that had gotten stuck between streams. The National Center for Disaster Prevention reported that total damage in Sonora was 1.03 billion pesos (US$54.6 million).

In Sinaloa, record-breaking rainfall of 98 US gal (370 L) per 11 sq ft (1 m^{2}) was reported in Culiacán, exceeding the amount the state had received from Hurricane Manuel in 2013. One person was killed in the community of Goritos where 14.150 in (359.41 mm) of rain fell. In Culiacán, a total of six deaths occurred. One person drowned after heavy rainfall occurred. Additionally, three women were swept away by floodwaters from the El Piojo stream; two bodies were later recovered. Two indirect deaths occurred from electrocution. Classes at all levels of education were cancelled in several municipalities as a result of the flooding. Many roads were damaged, with sinkholes appearing on Federal Highway 15. A bridge collapsed in Ahome, forcing the closure of a road. More than 16,000 people were evacuated and 13 shelters were set up due to severe flooding. Following the deluge of rainfall, the Culiacán River Derivative Dam overflowed. The Eustaquio Buelna dam filled to more than 144 percent of its capacity. A freight train derailed while traveling from Retes Station to Techa in Mocorito. The Cahuinahua canal overflowed in the municipality of El Fuerte, flooding several communities. Damage to agriculture exceeded 800 million pesos (US$41 million) in Sinaloa after 14,000 hectares (35,000 acres) of agricultural fields and hydro-agricultural infrastructure were inundated. In total, over 500,000 birds and 15,000 heads of cattle, goats, and pigs were killed and swept away by the currents of engorged rivers. As a result, approximately 58,000 jobs were impacted. Over 300,000 structures were inundated in Sinaloa, including 160 schools; in the coastal city of Los Mochis, 70,000 buildings were damaged. The National Center for Disaster Prevention reported that total damage in Sinaloa was 3.18 billion pesos (US$169 million). At least 804 million pesos (US$42.7 million) in losses occurred in the economic sector and 755 million pesos (US$40.1 million) in losses occurred in the communications and transportation sector. Around 48.4 percent of the total was damage and losses in education, health, housing, hydraulic systems, and sports and cultural attractions. Over 2.2 million pesos (US$117,000) in damage and losses occurred to public infrastructure.

In the state of Chihuahua, three people were reported dead. A 51-year-old man and a 45-year-old woman drowned in the municipality of Satevó after being dragged by strong currents. In Namiquipa, the body of a 45-year-old man was recovered after he drowned while attempting to cross an engorged stream. Rainfall in the southwestern portion of the state was 2.0–3.9 in (50–99 mm), with a small region reporting up to 7.83 in (199 mm). In Guanajuato, heavy rainfall forced the reopening of floodgates at the Ignacio Allende Dam.

=== United States ===
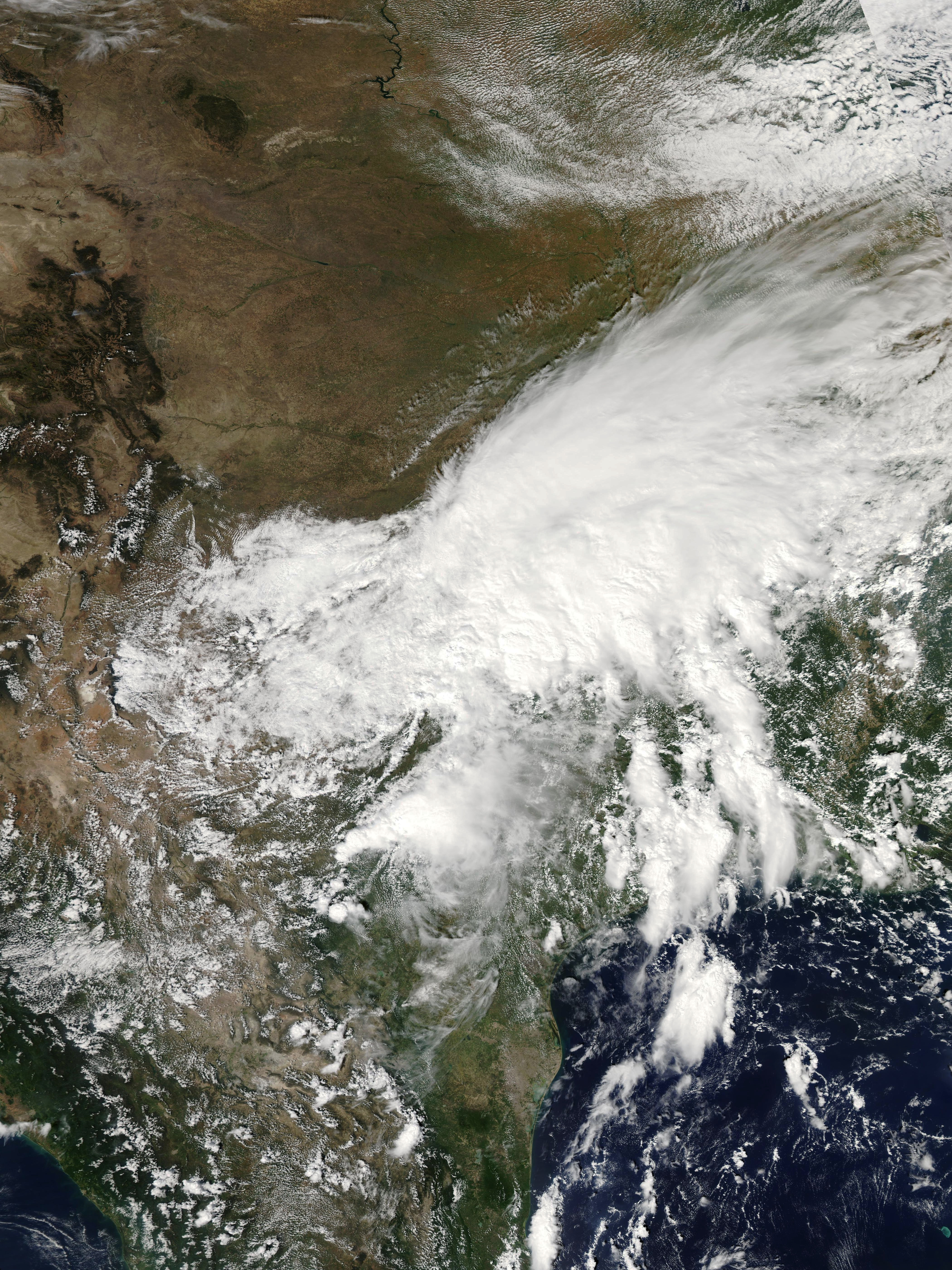
Remnants of Tropical Depression Nineteen-E over the Central United States on September 21

Tropical Depression Nineteen-E's remnant moisture also caused flooding in the U.S. states of Arizona, Texas, Oklahoma, and Arkansas after drawing strength from the Gulf of Mexico. In those states, damage estimates totaled about $250 million (USD). Minimal damage was also reported in the state of New Mexico.

In Arizona, Nineteen-E caused flash flooding at multiple locations on September 19. Approximately 2–3 in (50–80 mm) of rain fell near Sahuarita, causing washes of up to 2 ft (0.6 m) that left several individuals stranded in their vehicles. In Thatcher, 1.5–2.5 in (38–63 mm) of rain fell, causing two homes to flood. Additionally, multiple roads flooded after a drainage canal overflowed. Several dorm rooms at Eastern Arizona College flooded, along with several apartments in the area. Near Silverbell, 3 ft (0.9 m) of water ran over the intersection of two roads. Near Vicksburg, severe rain caused flash flooding, resulting in road closures near Interstate 10. It was also reported that 1.56 in (39.6 mm) of rain fell in Tucson, where a person walking near the Pantano Wash was rescued after being overcome by rising waters. In New Mexico, it was reported that a large cottonwood tree blew down near the Kirtland Air Force Base after winds of 50 knots (58 mph; 93 km/h) occurred. Damage was reported at approximately $1,000 (USD). The National Weather Service stated that no other damage had been reported for New Mexico. In Albuquerque a peak rainfall total of 1.40 in (35.6 mm) was reported.

In Texas, Nineteen-E brought torrential rains that caused significant flooding in many areas. In Everman, a suburb of Fort Worth, water was reportedly up to 6 ft (2 m) deep in places. Over 60 homes were inundated, which forced many people to evacuate. On September 23, the body of a 23-year-old was recovered from a creek in Fort Worth. 14 people had to be rescued from broken-down cars in the Dallas-Fort Worth area. Near Austin, 61 people from a wedding venue had to be rescued by firefighters. Additionally, the Shady River RV Resort off of State Highway 29 and near Interstate 35 was evacuated. In Arlington, a 23-year-old man drowned after being swept off a bridge. At Dallas/Fort Worth International Airport, over 8 in (200 mm) of rain fell. In Dallas, 15 people, including five police officers, were rescued from rising waters. Additionally, in Killeen, 34 patients were evacuated from the Metroplex Hospital after a lightning strike knocked out power to the facility. Several roads in Nolan, Jones, Tom Green, Uvalde, Rockwall, Fannin, Sutton, and Schleicher Counties were closed due to flooding and damage. Near Farmersville, high water along a railway bridge led to a train derailment. While no one was injured, numerous freight train cars went off the rails. In Electra, water up to 1 ft (0.3 m) deep was flowing over multiple city streets. In Knox City, a vehicle stalled after its driver attempted to drive through flood waters. Additionally, Sonora was hit with a 25 ft (7.6 m) wall of water after the spillways to several dams were activated. Water flooded all access points to the town, preventing first responders from entering. Over 250 homes in the village were either damaged or destroyed by the flood waters.

In Oklahoma, Nineteen-E caused widespread flooding after dropping large amounts of rain. The highest recorded rainfall total in far northern Johnston County was approximately 15.81 in (401.6 mm). In Pontotoc County, four water rescues were conducted and a state of emergency was declared as rainfall and flooding associated with Nineteen-E made many roads near the city of Ada impossible to navigate. In Fittstown and Stonewall, some roads were washed out. In a 12-hour period, 12.44 in (316.0 mm) of rain fell in Fittstown; this was the most rainfall recorded in a 12-hour span since the Oklahoma Mesonet was founded in 1990. In total, 10 roads in the county were closed due to being washed out; the cost to repair these roads was estimated at $350,000 (USD). Additionally, roads in several other counties were closed and/or washed out as a result of severe flooding, including U.S. 77.

In Arkansas, Nineteen-E caused flash flooding that resulted in the closure of several roads. The Northeast Arkansas District Fair in Jonesboro was cancelled due to the anticipation of severe flooding. Nearly 7 in (200 mm) of rain fell in Searcy County and White County. The flash flooding that occurred because of this rainfall closed several roadways. First responders helped to free vehicles that were stalled in the water and placed barricades in areas affected by the flooding.

== Aftermath ==
=== Mexico ===
In Mexico, severe flooding in Sonora and Sinaloa prompted the execution of numerous disaster plans and safety measures. In Sinaloa, the extent and severity of the flooding was conveyed by the public through the use of social media platforms. On September 27, the municipalities of Ahome, Culiacán, Angostura, Badiraguato, Choix, Guasave, El Fuerte, Mocorito, Sinaloa, Salvador Alvarado, and Navolato were all declared disaster areas by the Government of Mexico. In Culiacán, the Autonomous University of the West and part of the Autonomous University of Sinaloa were designated as temporary shelters for people affected by the depression. After the extent of the flooding became known, the Marine Plan was activated for Baja California, Baja California Sur, Sonora and Sinaloa to help victims of the floods. Moreover, the Mexican Army initiated the DN-3 plan for natural disasters and deployed some 2,000 soldiers in Sinaloa and Sonora to aid in relief efforts. In Sinaloa, four aircraft were sent to assist in cleanup efforts, three search and rescue teams were deployed, and two helicopters were used to transport supplies to flood victims. Additionally, 17 helicopters were sent to perform reconnaissance in Sonora and transport supplies. The governor of Sinaloa, Quirino Ordaz Coppel, encouraged citizens to contribute food, water, and clothing in order to assist with the relief effort. Several days later, the National Fund for Natural Disasters (Fonden) was activated to assist local and regional governments in responding to the flooding. Additionally, the Macrosimulacro 2018, a nationwide disaster evacuation drill, was suspended as a precautionary measure in Sonora and Baja California Sur. In the latter state, safety devices were implemented to prevent people from crossing swollen streams.

The Sinaloa Ministry of Social Development (Sedesol) faced lawsuits after delivering old, diaper-filled mattresses to victims of the storm. The administrative coordinator for Sedesol, Carlos Castro Olivas, was arrested on October 18, 2018, and charged with the crimes of illegal negotiations to the detriment of public service and society and embezzlement in connection with the distribution of rotten mattresses following Nineteen-E. Carlos Castro Olivas was acquitted on December 17, 2020, as a result of a lack of evidence after two key witnesses for the prosecution failed to appear in court. Diego Maradona, then coach of the Dorados de Sinaloa, hosted a charity dinner on November 5 to provide financial support for individuals affected by Hurricane Willa and Nineteen-E. Fonden announced in 2019 that it would provide $33 million pesos (US$1.5 million) to support reconstruction in Culiacán. Over 1.812 billion pesos (US$92.2 million) in relief had been authorized for areas affected by flooding, however, the location of the money is unknown. During 2019, officials worked to repair damaged bridges on Federal Highway 15.

Two children lost their lives in Culiacán as a result of damage inflicted to a storm sewer by Nineteen-E. The first child, a 9-year-old boy, died after falling into a sinkhole in December 2018 while trying to avoid the damaged sewer. The second child, a 17-year-old girl, was killed after having been swept through a 4.9 ft (1.5 m)-wide hole in the sewer. Municipal officials repaired the damage in September 2019. President Andrés Manuel López Obrador approved a request in February 2019 to improve hydraulic flood-prevention systems in the municipalities of Culiacán and Ahome. The Sinaloa state government launched a 1.3 billion peso (US$67.6 million)-economic recovery package. Nearly a year after the storm, the government provided 500 million pesos (US$26 million) in funds to improve hydraulic flood-prevention systems in Ahome. From 2019 to 2020, the state government built an underground water storage system to drain excess water from the El Piojo stream to prevent future severe flooding. Flood drainage pipes were installed in El Carrizo to prevent future flood events. The National Commission for Aquaculture and Fisheries provided funds for the dredging of a dock and two water channels in the Santa María Bay, Angostura, Sinaloa, to alleviate the effects of Nineteen-E on the environment. The work was expected to remove 7,970,000 cu ft (225,700 m^{3}) of silt and benefit 2,000 fishermen.

=== United States ===
In the United States, severe flooding in Texas resulted in both local and federal efforts being established in order to provide aid to victims. On September 28, Governor Greg Abbott issued a disaster declaration for Ellis, Sutton, Tarrant, Fannin, and Uvalde Counties in response to widespread and severe property damage caused by the floods. On February 25, 2019, President Donald Trump declared a number of counties, including the counties impacted by the remnants of Nineteen-E from September 20–21, a major disaster area after a series of storms impacted the state from September through November. In Sutton County, the Bank & Trust and the San Angelo Area Foundation set up relief funds for Sonora. Additionally, the San Angelo Health Foundation donated a total of $250,000 (USD) to the Sonora Flood Relief Fund for flood damage that occurred on September 21. Combined with over 450 other donations and grants, the relief fund reached a total of approximately $750,000 (USD). Lions Clubs International and other private organizations and charities also donated supplies and money to the relief effort. Various state agencies evaluated damage to infrastructure and provided funding for repairs as well. Moreover, Texas musicians scheduled multiple concerts in order to raise funds for flood relief in Sonora. A few days after the floods, American Red Cross representatives arrived to help aid the recovery efforts. In Tarrant County, it was reported that various relief organizations were attempting to help with cleanup and recovery efforts within the Fort Worth suburb of Everman. The city set up a disaster relief station to provide assistance to displaced residents on September 22.

== See also ==
- Weather of 2018
- Tropical cyclones in 2018
- Tropical Storm Rachel (1990) – a tropical storm that affected the same area, causing severe flooding that killed 18
- Tropical Storm Georgette (2010) – a tropical storm that made landfall in the same area, killing one
