= Cherry Creek (Arizona) =

River in Arizona, US

Coordinates: 33°40′21″N 110°48′01″W

Cherry Creek is a 57-mile (92 km) tributary of the Salt River in central Arizona. The creek flows south from the Mogollon Rim to join the Salt River about 10 miles (16 km) above Theodore Roosevelt Lake.
