= South Bisbee, Arizona =

- Populated place
- Location within the state of Arizona South Bisbee (the United States)
- Coordinates: 31°25′01″N 109°54′13″W
- Country: United States
- State: Arizona
- County: Cochise
- Elevation: 5,207 ft (1,587 m)
- Time zone: UTC-7 (Mountain (MST))
  - Summer (DST): UTC-7 (MST)
- Area code: 520
- FIPS code: 04-68430
- GNIS feature ID: 11573

South Bisbee was a populated place situated in Cochise County, Arizona, United States, just north of the international border with Mexico. The land is owned by the mining company Freeport McMoRan and they evicted the residents in 2013.
