= San Pedro, Arizona =

- Populated place
- Location within the state of Arizona San Pedro (the United States)
- Coordinates: 32°05′00″N 111°29′17″W
- Country: United States
- State: Arizona
- County: Pima
- Elevation: 2,694 ft (821 m)
- Time zone: UTC-7 (Mountain (MST))
  - Summer (DST): UTC-7 (MST)
- Area code: 520
- FIPS code: 04-63640
- GNIS feature ID: 10848

San Pedro, also known as San Pedro Well and Viopoli or Viopuli, is a populated place situated in Pima County, Arizona, United States.

== Geography ==
San Pedro has an estimated elevation of 2,694 feet (821 m) above sea level.

== Location ==
Located on the east side of the San Pedro River, it is thought it might be the site of the original Old Presidio of San Pedro, which can be seen on maps as early as 1879.

== History ==
A post office opened at the location on April 22, 1872.
