= Shaotkam, Arizona =

- Populated place
- Location within the state of Arizona Shaotkam (the United States)
- Coordinates: 31°46′10″N 112°24′37″W
- Country: United States
- State: Arizona
- County: Pima
- Elevation: 1,683 ft (513 m)
- Time zone: UTC-7 (Mountain (MST))
  - Summer (DST): UTC-7 (MST)
- Area code: 520
- FIPS code: 04-65830
- GNIS feature ID: 25244

Shaotkam is a populated place situated in Pima County, Arizona, United States. Throughout its history, it has been known by various names, including Camote, Comate, Comote, Comoti, Los Camotes, Los Comates, Shaatkam, and Shaot Kam. The name Shaotkam was made official as a result of a Board on Geographic Names decision in 1941. It has an estimated elevation of 1,683 feet (513 m) above sea level.
