= Sixmile Village, Arizona =

- Populated place
- Location within Arizona Location within the United States
- Coordinates: 36°57′54″N 112°34′44″W
- Country: United States
- State: Arizona
- County: Mohave
- Elevation: 4,784 ft (1,458 m)
- Time zone: UTC-7 (Mountain (MST))
  - Summer (DST): UTC-7 (MST)
- Area code: 928
- GNIS feature ID: 24097

Sixmile Village is a populated place situated in Mohave County, Arizona, United States, just south of the border with Utah.
