= Skoksonak, Arizona =

- Populated place
- Location within the state of Arizona Skoksonak (the United States)
- Coordinates: 32°17′44″N 111°32′15″W
- Country: United States
- State: Arizona
- County: Pima
- Elevation: 2,205 ft (672 m)
- Time zone: UTC-7 (Mountain (MST))
  - Summer (DST): UTC-7 (MST)
- Area code: 520
- FIPS code: 04-67330
- GNIS feature ID: 24619

Skoksonak is a populated place situated in Pima County, Arizona, United States. It has an estimated elevation of 2,205 feet (672 m) above sea level.
