= Sif Vaya, Arizona =

- Populated place
- Location within the state of Arizona Sif Vaya (the United States)
- Coordinates: 32°37′05″N 112°06′52″W
- Country: United States
- State: Arizona
- County: Pinal
- Elevation: 1,965 ft (599 m)
- Time zone: UTC-7 (Mountain (MST))
  - Summer (DST): UTC-7 (MST)
- Area code: 520
- FIPS code: 04-66860
- GNIS feature ID: 24613

Sif Vaya is a populated place situated in Pinal County, Arizona, United States. Over the years it has also been known as Bitter Well, Bitter Wells, Bitters Well, and Sivvaxia. Sif Vaya, which means bitter well in O'odham, became the official name as a result of a decision by the Board on Geographic Names in 1941. It has an estimated elevation of 1,965 feet (599 m) above sea level.
