= San Luis (II), Pima County, Arizona =

San Luis, Arizona
- Populated place
- Location within the state of Arizona San Luis (the United States)
- Coordinates: 32°04′49″N 111°57′18″W
- Country: United States
- State: Arizona
- County: Pima
- Elevation: 1,795 ft (547 m)
- Time zone: UTC-7 (Mountain (MST))
  - Summer (DST): UTC-7 (MST)
- Area code: 520
- GNIS feature ID: 24596

San Luis is a populated place situated in Pima County, Arizona, United States. It is one of two locations in Pima County with this name. Its historical O'odham name was Ñu:wĭ Ki:, meaning "Buzzard's House", but in 1939 the O'odham chose to adopt the name of the saint instead. (Note: See the decision card located in the USGS reference) It has also been known as Cobabi and Noli. It has an estimated elevation of 1,795 feet (547 m) above sea level.
