= Stotonic, Arizona =

Populated place in Pinal County, Arizona, US

- Populated place
- Location within the state of Arizona Stotonic (the United States)
- Coordinates: 33°09′29″N 111°47′57″W
- Country: United States
- State: Arizona
- County: Pinal
- Elevation: 1,230 ft (375 m)
- Time zone: UTC-7 (Mountain (MST))
  - Summer (DST): UTC-7 (MST)
- Area code: 520
- FIPS code: 04-69865
- GNIS feature ID: 25340

Stotonic is a village on the Gila River Indian Community in Pinal County, Arizona. Historically, it has also been known as Statonic, Stetonic, Stontonyak, Stotonik, and Stotonyak. The location's name was officially designated as Stotonic by a decision of the Board on Geographic Names in 1941. It has an estimated elevation of 1,230 feet (370 m) above sea level. To differentiate from the village of a similar name on the San Xavier Indian Reservation, the Office of Indian Affairs recommended that this village use the Papago, or Tohono O'odham spelling, while the San Xavier reservation village use the Pima, or Akimel O'otham spelling, Stotonic. The recommendation was followed by the Board on Geographic Names in their 1941 decision. (Note: For the details of the name decision, please see the decision card available on the GNIS reference for Stotonyak.)
