= Stan Shuatuk, Arizona =

- Populated place
- Location within the state of Arizona Stan Shuatuk (the United States)
- Coordinates: 31°47′56″N 112°18′01″W
- Country: United States
- State: Arizona
- County: Pima
- Elevation: 1,770 ft (540 m)
- Time zone: UTC-7 (Mountain (MST))
  - Summer (DST): UTC-7 (MST)
- Area code: 520
- FIPS code: 04-69200
- GNIS feature ID: 24625

Stan Shuatuk is a populated place situated in Pima County, Arizona, United States, just north of the international border with Mexico. Historically, it has also been known as Cervantis Well, La Moralita, Molinitos, Molinton, Molonitos, and Serventi Well. In 1941, the name officially became Stan Shuatuk through a decision by the Board on Geographic Names. The name request came through a request by the Bureau of Indian Affairs, who stated that Stan Shuatuk was "used and understood by the residents and Papagos (Tohono O'odham) in general." (Note: For the information on the name request, please see the "decision card", the link of which can be found on the GNIS webpage.) In O'odham, stan shuatuk means "hot water". It has an estimated elevation of 1,772 feet (540 m) above sea level.
