= Sivili Chuchg, Arizona =

- Populated place
- Location within the state of Arizona Sivili Chuchg (the United States)
- Coordinates: 31°44′39″N 112°09′38″W
- Country: United States
- State: Arizona
- County: Pima
- Elevation: 2,014 ft (614 m)
- Time zone: UTC-7 (Mountain (MST))
  - Summer (DST): UTC-7 (MST)
- Area code: 520
- FIPS code: 04-67285
- GNIS feature ID: 24618

Sivili Chuchg is a populated place situated in Pima County, Arizona, United States, very near the international border with Mexico. The name comes from the O'odham sivili chuchg, which itself borrowed siwol from Spanish, meaning "onion". The O'odham phrase means "onions standing". It has an estimated elevation of 2,014 feet (614 m) above sea level.
