= Seneca, Arizona =

Unincorporated community in the state of Arizona, United States

- Populated place
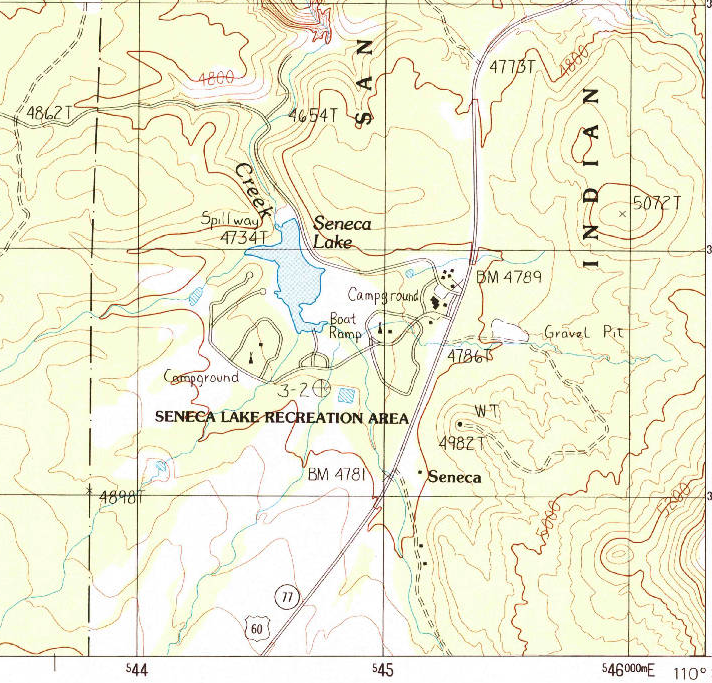
- 1988 USGS map excerpt showing Seneca area

- Location within the state of Arizona Seneca (the United States)
- Coordinates: 33°45′24″N 110°30′46″W
- Country: United States
- State: Arizona
- County: Gila
- Elevation: 4,800 ft (1,463 m)
- Time zone: UTC-7 (Mountain (MST))
  - Summer (DST): UTC-7 (MST)
- Area code: 928
- FIPS code: 04-65625
- GNIS feature ID: 34260

Seneca is a former unincorporated community in Gila County, Arizona, United States. It has an estimated elevation of 4,800 feet (1,500 m) above sea level. It is located between Globe (the county seat of Gila) and Show Low, along U.S. Route 60, and contained within the San Carlos Apache Indian Reservation,

== History ==
In the early 1890s, Major Erasmus Corwin Gilbreath of the United States Army made camp at Seneca.

U.S. 60 was built through the area and completed in 1937. By 1950, Desert Magazine was reporting that Seneca had a service station, restaurant, and cabins, which were for tourists and for miners at nearby asbestos mines. These facilities were called "Apache Rest" in the 1950s.

By early 1963, the former cafe and other buildings had been taken down, and work was underway on an earthen dam, which was built to create Seneca Lake. The San Carlos Apaches hoped the lake would draw fishers and campers, and to support future plans for a resort.

Additional development followed, including a restaurant, trading post, and campground. The "Cienega Park" park recreational facility opened in 1971. There were also plans to add a motel, golf course, riding stables, and more. But the development faced continual hurdles. A 1975 article stated that the complex, including a restaurant, grocery, and fishing supply shop, had shut down the prior year. Because there were no local power lines, diesel generators were being used, which proved to be too costly. Reed and weed growth along the lake shore was also impeding shore fishing. The plan was not to reopen until power lines had been run to the site, which took a few years. The facility was re-opened in 1979, and at that point was reported to have 144 campsites, a day-use picnic area, store, restaurant, and service station, and was run by 20 members of the tribe. But, again by 1986, though the lake was still being stocked, the facilities had been shut down.

The tribe invested over $500,000 in the property, but defaulted on its loan led to repossession of the property improvements.

As reported in a 2016 Arizona Republic article, the site today is only some decaying and vandalized buildings.
