= Canyon Creek, Washington =

- CDP
- Location of Canyon Creek, Washington
- Coordinates: 48°6′44″N 121°57′50″W
- Country: United States
- State: Washington
- County: Snohomish

Area
  - Total: 5.9 sq mi (15.2 km^{2})
  - Land: 5.8 sq mi (14.9 km^{2})
  - Water: 0.15 sq mi (0.4 km^{2})

Population (2020)
  - Total: 3,445
  - Density: 599/sq mi (231/km^{2})
- Time zone: UTC-8 (Pacific (PST))
  - Summer (DST): UTC-7 (PDT)
- FIPS code: 53-34277

Canyon Creek is a census-designated place (CDP) in Snohomish County, Washington, United States. The population was 3,445 at the 2020 census, up from 3,200 at the 2010 census. Prior to the 2010 census, the CDP was known as Jordan Road-Canyon Creek.

== Geography ==
Canyon Creek is located at 48°06′44″N 121°57′50″W (48.112267, -121.963977).

According to the United States Census Bureau, the CDP has a total area of 5.9 square miles (15 km^{2}), of which, 5.7 square miles (15 km^{2}) of it is land and 0.1 square miles (0.26 km^{2}) of it (2.38%) is water.

== Demographics ==
Historical population
Census	Pop.	Note	%±
2000	2,326		—
2010	3,200		37.6%
2020	3,448		7.8%
U.S. Decennial Census; 1970 1980 1990; 2000 2010

The community first appeared as a census designated place under the name Jordan Road-Canyon Creek in the 2000 U.S. census. The name was changed to Canyon Creek for the 2010 U.S. census.

=== Racial and ethnic composition ===
Canyon Creek CDP, Washington – Racial and ethnic composition Note: the US Census treats Hispanic/Latino as an ethnic category. This table excludes Latinos from the racial categories and assigns them to a separate category. Hispanics/Latinos may be of any race.
Race / Ethnicity (NH = Non-Hispanic)	Pop 2000	Pop 2010	Pop 2020	% 2000	% 2010	% 2020
White alone (NH)	2,137	2,888	2,868	91.87%	90.25%	83.25%
Black or African American alone (NH)	5	12	13	0.21%	0.38%	0.38%
Native American or Alaska Native alone (NH)	21	25	38	0.90%	0.78%	1.10%
Asian alone (NH)	11	24	53	0.47%	0.75%	1.54%
Native Hawaiian or Pacific Islander alone (NH)	2	4	19	0.09%	0.13%	0.55%
Other race alone (NH)	7	2	21	0.30%	0.06%	0.61%
Mixed race or Multiracial (NH)	63	99	214	2.71%	3.09%	6.21%
Hispanic or Latino (any race)	80	146	219	3.44%	4.56%	6.36%
Total	2,326	3,200	3,445	100.00%	100.00%	100.00%

=== 2000 census ===
As of the census of 2000, there were 2,326 people, 809 households, and 597 families residing in the CDP. The population density was 405.3 people per square mile (156.5 people/km^{2}). There were 865 housing units at an average density of 150.7 units per square mile (58.2 units/km^{2}). The racial makeup of the CDP was 93.59% White, 0.21% African American, 0.90% Native American, 0.47% Asian, 0.09% Pacific Islander, 1.72% from other races, and 3.01% from two or more races. Hispanic or Latino of any race were 3.44% of the population.

There were 809 households, out of which 45.4% had children under the age of 18 living with them, 59.8% were married couples living together, 8.0% had a female householder with no husband present, and 26.2% were non-families. 18.5% of all households were made up of individuals, and 3.7% had someone living alone who was 65 years of age or older. The average household size was 2.88 and the average family size was 3.28.

In the CDP, the age distribution of the population shows 32.8% under the age of 18, 6.9% from 18 to 24, 37.5% from 25 to 44, 17.5% from 45 to 64, and 5.2% who were 65 years of age or older. The median age was 31 years. For every 100 females, there were 104.6 males. For every 100 females age 18 and over, there were 110.4 males.

The median income for a household in the CDP was $51,370, and the median income for a family was $51,037. Males had a median income of $38,614 versus $26,781 for females. The per capita income for the CDP was $18,613. About 5.8% of families and 8.7% of the population were below the poverty line, including 11.3% of those under age 18 and none of those age 65 or over.
