= Siovi Shuatak, Arizona =

- Populated place
- Location within the state of Arizona Siovi Shuatak (the United States)
- Coordinates: 31°57′03″N 112°35′54″W
- Country: United States
- State: Arizona
- County: Pima
- Elevation: 2,162 ft (659 m)
- Time zone: UTC-7 (Mountain (MST))
  - Summer (DST): UTC-7 (MST)
- Area code: 520
- FIPS code: 04-67220
- GNIS feature ID: 24617

Siovi Shuatak is a populated place situated in Pima County, Arizona, United States. The location has been known by numerous names over the years: Cochiba Well, Cochibo, Cochibo Well, Cochivo, Con Quien, Coons Can Well, Manuels Well, and Sweetwater. Its name officially became Siovi Shuatak, which is O'odham for "sweet water". It has an estimated elevation of 2,162 feet (659 m) above sea level.
