= South Santan, Arizona =

- Populated place
- Location within the state of Arizona South Santan (the United States)
- Coordinates: 33°07′03″N 111°44′46″W
- Country: United States
- State: Arizona
- County: Pinal
- Elevation: 1,263 ft (385 m)
- Time zone: UTC-7 (Mountain (MST))
  - Summer (DST): UTC-7 (MST)
- Area code: 480
- FIPS code: 04-68750
- GNIS feature ID: 24624

South Santan is a populated place situated in Pinal County, Arizona, United States. It has an estimated elevation of 1,263 feet (385 m) above sea level.
