= Sundad, Arizona =

- Populated place
- Location within Arizona Location within the United States
- Coordinates: 33°10′53″N 113°14′10″W
- Country: United States
- State: Arizona
- County: Maricopa
- Elevation: 965 ft (294 m)
- Time zone: UTC-7 (Mountain (MST))
  - Summer (DST): UTC-7 (MST)
- Area code: 928
- FIPS code: 04-70380
- GNIS feature ID: 11956

Sundad is an unincorporated area in the far west of Maricopa County, Arizona, United States, along the border of Yuma County. It has an estimated elevation of 965 feet (294 m) above sea level. It is located north of Agua Caliente and east of Sacation Flats.

The Bureau of Land Management considers Sundad a historic site.

== History ==
Sundad was initially a mining town, and in the 1920s was the proposed site of a sanatorium. By the 1950s, Sundad was referred to in the local press as a ghost town, with several reports noting this in September 1953, when nine U.S. Air Force crewmen were forced to parachute into the location following the collision of their airplanes during a refueling exercise. A 1966 report noted that following the death of resident Lee R. Bailey, his wife Velma "was now left alone in this remote, small ghost town", living in their one-room mining shack with no telephone and no neighbors.

In 1970, R. Agin owned the Sundad Copper Mine, located on Bureau of Land Management land at 33.1819°N 113.23190°W. The mine produced both silver and copper from surface and underground mining activities. A 1991 piece in The Arizona Republic on area hiking noted that "the hilly areas near the old Sundad Mine are particularly lovely, especially where the ocotillos and saguaro cactuses are mixed on the hillsides", but cautioned that "the old mine site is difficult to find", marked by rocks laid out to spell Sundad.

A 500 feet deep wildcat oil well was once drilled near Sundad.
