= Canyon Creek (Salt River tributary) =

Waterbody in Gila County, Arizona

Coordinates: 33°48′33″N 110°39′29″W

Canyon Creek is a 48-mile (77 km) tributary of the Salt River in central Arizona. Originating on the Mogollon Rim, the creek flows generally south to its confluence with the Salt in the Salt River Canyon Wilderness, about 16 miles (26 km) above Theodore Roosevelt Lake.
