= Stotonyak, Arizona =

- Populated place
- Location within the state of Arizona Stotonyak (the United States)
- Coordinates: 32°09′18″N 112°22′07″W
- Country: United States
- State: Arizona
- County: Pima
- Elevation: 1,919 ft (585 m)
- Time zone: UTC-7 (Mountain (MST))
  - Summer (DST): UTC-7 (MST)
- Area code: 520
- FIPS code: 04-69880
- GNIS feature ID: 24630

Stotonyak is a populated place situated on the San Xavier Indian Reservation in Pima County, Arizona, United States. It has an estimated elevation of 1,919 feet (585 m) above sea level. To differentiate from the village of a similar name on the Gila River Indian Community, the Office of Indian Affairs recommended that this village use the Papago, or Tohono O'odham spelling, while the Gila River reservation village use the Pima, or Akimel O'otham spelling, Stotonic. The recommendation was followed by the Board on Geographic Names in their 1941 decision. (Note: For the details of the name decision, please see the decision card available on the GNIS reference.) In the O'odham language, stotonyak means "many ants.
