= Schuchuli, Arizona =

Populated place in Pima County, Arizona, US

- Populated place
- Location within the state of Arizona Schuchuli (the United States)
- Coordinates: 32°13′20″N 112°41′18″W
- Country: United States
- State: Arizona
- County: Pima
- Elevation: 2,000 ft (600 m)
- Time zone: UTC-7 (Mountain (MST))
  - Summer (DST): UTC-7 (MST)
- Area code: 520
- FIPS code: 04-64730
- GNIS feature ID: 11013

Schuchuli, also known as Gunsight, Gunsight Ranch, Gunsight Well, and Sialatuk, is a populated place situated in Pima County, Arizona. It has an estimated elevation of 1,968 feet (600 m) above sea level. Schuchuli became the official name of the location as a result of a decision by the Board on Geographic Names in 1941, and is derived from the Tohono O'odham s-cuculig, which means "many chickens".
