= Silverbell, Arizona =

- Populated place
- Location within the state of Arizona Silverbell (the United States)
- Coordinates: 32°25′50″N 111°32′17″W
- Country: United States
- State: Arizona
- County: Pima
- Elevation: 2,605 ft (794 m)
- Time zone: UTC-7 (Mountain (MST))
  - Summer (DST): UTC-7 (MST)
- Area code: 520
- GNIS feature ID: 24616

Silverbell is a populated place situated in Pima County, Arizona, United States. The location is one of two places in Pima County with similar names, the other being Silver Bell, which is located nearby in the Silver Bell Mountains. This location was also known as Silver Bell, but the name was officially changed in 1961 as a result of a decision by the Board on Geographic Names. It has an estimated elevation of 2,605 feet (794 m) above sea level.
