= Sombrero Butte, Arizona =

- Populated place
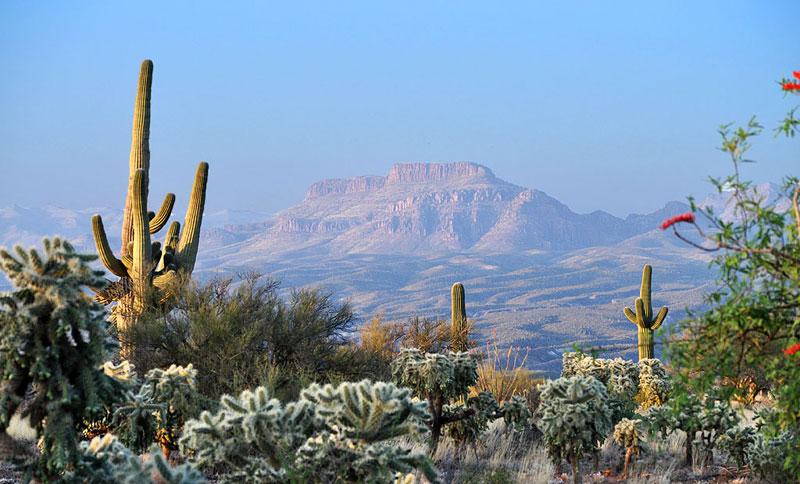
- A view of Sombrero Butte from Redington Rd SE of San Manuel, Arizona.

- Location within the state of Arizona Sombrero Butte (the United States)
- Coordinates: 32°43′34″N 110°28′56″W
- Country: United States
- State: Arizona
- County: Pinal
- Elevation: 4,072 ft (1,241 m)
- Time zone: UTC-7 (Mountain (MST))
  - Summer (DST): UTC-7 (MST)
- Area code: 520
- FIPS code: 04-68045
- GNIS feature ID: 24622

Sombrero Butte is a populated place situated in Pinal County, Arizona, United States. The location takes its name from a nearby butte of the same name, so called because of its resemblance to a huge sombrero. It has an estimated elevation of 4,071 feet (1,241 m) above sea level.
