= List of places in Arizona (T) =

This is a list of cities, towns, unincorporated communities, counties, and other places in the U.S. state of Arizona, which start with the letter T. This list is derived from the Geographic Names Information System, which has numerous errors, so it also includes many ghost towns and historical places that are not necessarily communities or actual populated places. This list also includes information on the number and names of counties in which the place lies, its lower and upper ZIP code bounds, if applicable, its U.S. Geological Survey (USGS) reference number(s) (called the GNIS), class as designated by the USGS, and incorporated community located in (if applicable).

== T ==
Name of place	Number of counties	Principal county	GNIS #(s)	Class	Located in	ZIP code	
Name of place	Number of counties	Principal county	GNIS #(s)	Class	Located in	Lower	Upper
Tacna	1	Yuma County	2410046	CDP		85352	
Tahchee	1	Apache County	25272	Populated Place		86503	
Tanner Springs	1	Apache County	24640	Populated Place			
Tanque Verde	1	Pima County	2410057	CDP		85715	
Tatai Toak	1	Pima County	24647	Populated Place			
Tatk Kam Vo	1	Pima County	24645	Populated Place			
Tatkum Vo	1	Pima County	24646	Populated Place			
Tat Momoli	1	Pinal County	2582874	CDP		85634	
Taylor	1	Navajo County	2413369	Civil (town)		85939	
Teec Nos Pos	1	Apache County	2410063	CDP		86514	
Tees Toh	1	Navajo County	2582875	CDP		86047	
Tempe	1	Maricopa County	2412045	Civil (city)		85281	87
Tempe Camp	1	Coconino County	35192	Populated Place			
Tes Nez Iah	1	Apache County	24651	Populated Place		86033	
Thatcher	1	Graham County	2413382	Civil (town)		85552	
Theba	1	Maricopa County	2582876	CDP		85337	
Three Forks	1	Apache County	35296	Populated Place			
Three Points	1	Pima County	2409315	CDP		85714	
Tiger	1	Pinal County	24654	Populated Place			
Tohono O'odham Indian Reservation	3	Pima County	23763	Civil (Indian reservation)		85634	
Tolani Lake	2	Coconino County	2582877	CDP		86047	
Tolchico	1	Coconino County	24656	Populated Place			
Tolleson	1	Maricopa County	2412078	Civil (city)		85353	
Tombstone	1	Cochise County	2412081	Civil (city)		85638	
Tonalea	1	Coconino County	2409332	CDP		86044	
Tonopah	1	Maricopa County	2582878	CDP		85354	
Tonto Apache Reservation	1	Gila County	32748	Civil (Indian reservation)		53720	
Tonto Basin	1	Gila County	2409334	CDP		85553	
Tonto Village	1	Gila County	2582879	CDP			
Topawa	1	Pima County	2582880	CDP		85639	
Topock	1	Mohave County	2582881	CDP		86436	
Top-of-the-World	2	Pinal County	2409335	CDP			
Tortilla Flat	1	Maricopa County	35406	Populated Place		85290	
Tortolita	1	Pima County	1777314	Populated Place		85737	
Totacon	1	Apache County	24658	Populated Place			
Totopitk	1	Maricopa County	24659	Populated Place		85634	
Toyei	1	Apache County	2582882	CDP		86505	
Trench Camp	1	Santa Cruz County	35457	Populated Place			
Troy	1	Pinal County	25341	Populated Place			
Truxton	1	Mohave County	2582883	CDP		86434	
Tsaile	1	Apache County	2409352	CDP		86556	
Tsegi	1	Navajo County	24662	Populated Place		86044	
Tsintaa Yiti Ii	1	Apache County	12792	Populated Place			
Tubac	1	Santa Cruz County	2409356	CDP		85646	
Tuba City	1	Coconino County	2409355	CDP		86045	
Tucson	1	Pima County	2412104	Civil (city)		85701	51
Tucson Estates	1	Pima County	2409357	CDP			
Tumacacori	1	Santa Cruz County	36879	Populated Place		85640	
Tumacacori-Carmen	1	Santa Cruz County	2409361	CDP			
Turkey Creek	1	Navajo County	2582884	CDP			
Tusayan	1	Coconino County	2663676	Civil (township)		86023	
Tuweep	1	Mohave County	25313	Populated Place			
Twin Buttes	1	Navajo County	25326	Populated Place			
Twin Buttes	1	Pima County	24663	Populated Place		85706	
Two Guns	1	Coconino County	24665	Populated Place			
