= Twin Buttes, Arizona =

Twin Buttes, Arizona may refer to one of two locations within Arizona:

- Twin Buttes, Navajo County, Arizona, a populated place in Navajo County
- Twin Buttes, Pima County, Arizona, a populated place in Pima County
