= Land administration =

Land administration is the way in which the rules of land tenure are applied and made operational. Land administration, whether formal or informal, comprises an extensive range of systems and processes to administer. The processes of land administration include the transfer of rights in land from one party to another through sale, lease, loan, gift and inheritance; the regulating of land and property development; the use and conservation of the land; the gathering of revenues from the land through sales, leasing, and taxation; and the resolving of conflicts concerning the ownership and the use of land. Land administration functions may be divided into four components: Juridical, regulatory, fiscal, and information management. These functions of land administration may be organized in terms of agencies responsible for surveying and mapping, land registration, land valuation and land revenue generation. The purpose and scope of this knowledge domain appear from the following introducing notes:

These Guidelines define land administration as the process whereby land and the information about land may be effectively managed. They are mainly written for senior governmental staff and politicians engaged in land administration issues. The aim is to outline the benefit of having a relevant and reliable land information system in place. The Guidelines identify the factors that should be taken into account in developing the legislation, organization, databases and maps, as well as the funding mechanisms, required to implement and maintain a solid land administration system.

An early example of use of the notion of land administration is a 1973 Seminar on Land Administration in Kuala Lumpur, Malaysia. Land administration arrangements were charted in a 1985 paper by Holstein, McLaughlin, and Nichols, and the Department of Lands and Surveys, Western Australia changed name in 1986 to Department of Land Administration. The UNECE in 1996 published Land Administration Guidelines With Special Reference to Countries in Transition, and the Dale & McLaughlin textbook on Land Information Management from 1988 was in 1999 succeeded by the textbook Land Administration.

== History ==
The practise of land administration is older than the presently used term. In The Cadastral Map in the Service of the State, mention is made of cadastral survey and subsequent tax collection in northern part of the Netherlands, initiated by an order in 1533. Other early, seventeenth century mapping for administrative purposes are found, e.g. in Sweden and in German principalities. In the duchy of Austrian Lombardy, a complete cadastral survey, the Milan cadaster, was finally adopted as a taxation base in 1760, and this provided the model for continental European countries to follow. Largely independent from this cadastral development, local courts recorded deeds of conveyance. In the context of codification of national legislation, most European countries in the nineteenth century established a title system at the local courts. England and Wales departed from this trend, as prolonged debates during the nineteenth century left parties with optional public recording of deeds of conveyance and the locating of properties and their boundaries on large-scale topographic maps, where available, similar to the metes and bounds method. However, most of British India was covered, during the nineteenth century, by the Revenue Survey.

In the colony (now state) of South Australia, Robert Torrens in 1858 introduced a title system. Like the Milan cadastre, this system became a model to be followed, initially within the Commonwealth. In the USA, the Land Ordinance of 1785 established the basis for the Public Land Survey System, which provides locational functions as the cadastral or - in modern terms - land information system described above. For the present adoption of the Torrens system in the USA, see Justin T. Holl, Jr. et al. (2007).

== International organizations ==
The domain of land administration is characterized by the engagement of international organizations as much as by its intrinsic, multi-disciplinary structure. Among intergovernmental organizations,

- The World Bank has supported land and real estate reforms across a wide range of countries. Its Agriculture and Rural Development research program includes the development of the Land Governance Assessment Framework (LGAF) and the issuing of Policy Research Reports like Land Policies for Growth and Poverty Reduction (2003). Moreover, the World Bank Group offer a yearly study of conditions for private sector development, including a rating of the ease of Registering property.
- UN-HABITAT's section on Land, Tenure & Property Administration focus on the implementation of land, housing and property rights, particularly women's secure tenure, affordable land management systems and pro-poor flexible types of tenure. The insufficient attention paid to the development of methods for implementing land policies, led to the development of pro poor land tools that are affordable and accessible for use by a variety of stakeholders. Efforts further include the creation of the Global Land Tool Network (GLTN).
- FAO focuses on land tenure in the rural domain, and has among others issued a Multilingual thesaurus on land tenure.
- The European Commission through its Development and Cooperation - EuropeAid supports agriculture and rural development, including a more secure access to land

International professional associations include

- The International Federation of Surveyors with its 10 commissions, including 7. Cadastre and Land Management, and the repository of pertinent articles, OICRF
- Commonwealth Association of Surveying and Land Economy (CASLE), with its international journal Survey Review
- The International Union of Notaries, which issues the international journal Notarius International

The list of partners in the Global Land Tool Network refers to more international organisations, NGOs, research institutions, etc.

== University departments ==
The Faculty of Geo-Information Science and Earth Observation (ITC) of the University of Twente, the Netherlands, provides international postgraduate education, research and project services in the field of geo-information science and earth observation using remote sensing and GIS. The aim of ITC's activities is the international exchange of knowledge, focusing on capacity building and institutional development in developing countries and emerging economies. ITC cooperates with the United Nations University at developing and carrying out a joint programme on capacity building in disaster management and in land administration

- Land Administration

Geomatics at the University of Melbourne, Australia, is about science and research into spatial information. The Geomatics team is an international leader in spatial data infrastructures and land administration. The research agenda embraces legal, institutional and technical issues of establishing and accessing information about land faced by land managers and administrators, in both developed and developing countries.

- Centre for Spatial Data Infrastructures and Land Administration

A number of universities offer land administration courses in the context of related master's degree programmes:

- Technical University of Munich (TUM), Germany: Land Management and Land Tenure
- KTH Royal Institute of Technology, Stockholm, Sweden: Real Estate Development and Financial Services
- Department of Geomatics Engineering, University of Calgary, Canada: GIS and Land Tenure
- Public Administration College of Zhejiang University: Land Resources Management
- Faculty of Geoinformation & Real Estate, Universiti Teknologi Malaysia (UTM): Land Administration and Development

== See also ==
- Cadastre
- Geomatics engineering
- Land reform
- Land registration
- Land tenure
