= Wolf Crossing =

Wolf Crossing may refer to one of the following places in the United States:

- Wolf Crossing, Michigan
- Wolf Crossing, Arizona
