= Perigua, Arizona =

Perigua, Arizona is an historical which might refer to one of two populated places in Arizona:

- Hickiwan, located in Pima County
- Tatai Toak, located in Pima County
