= Cadastre =

Register of real estate boundaries

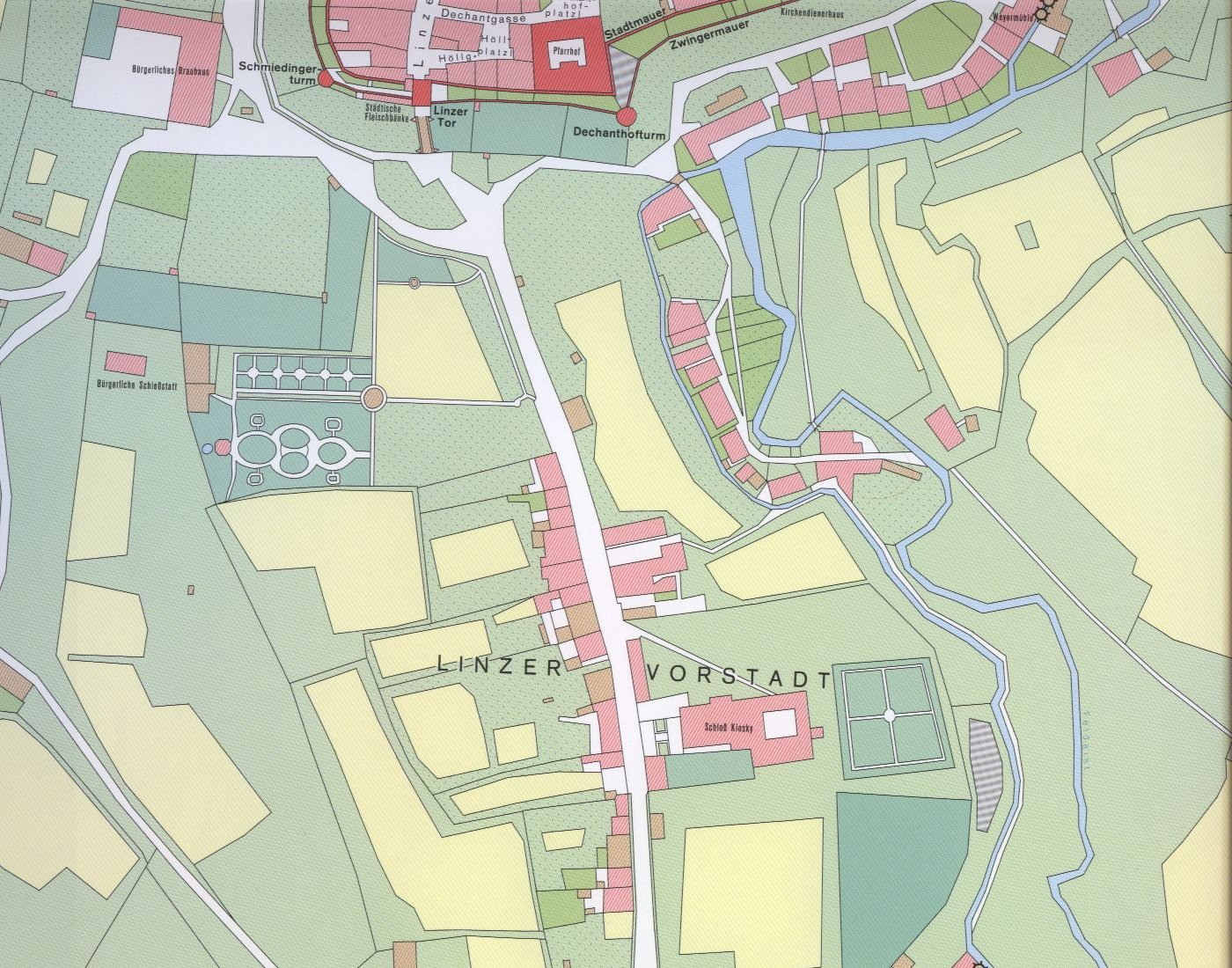
Cadastral map from 1827 in Austria (Franziszeischer cadastre)

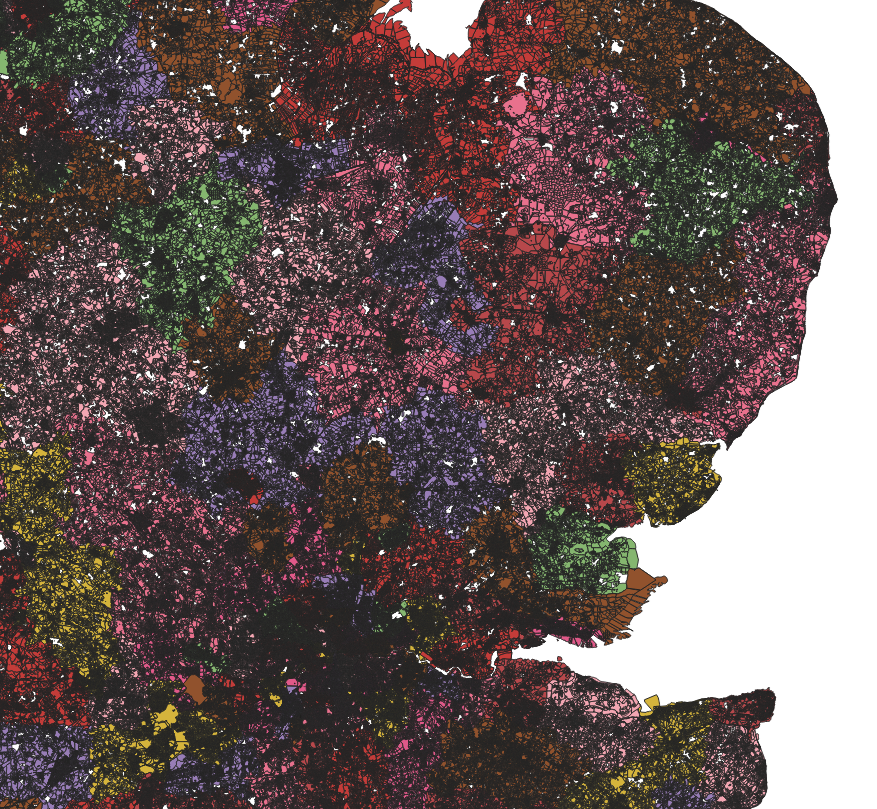
A modern cadastral map for Eastern England

A cadastre or cadaster (/kəˈdæstər/ kə-DAS-tər) is a comprehensive recording of the metes-and-bounds of a country's real estate or real property. Often it is represented graphically in a cadastral map, though historical written accounts, such as the Domesday Book in England in 1086, were early examples of cadastre.

In most countries, legal systems have developed around original administrative systems and use the cadastre to define the dimensions and location of land parcels described in legal documentation. A land parcel or cadastral parcel is defined as "a continuous area, or more appropriately volume, that is identified by a unique set of homogeneous property rights".

Cadastral surveys document the boundaries of land ownership, by the production of documents, diagrams, sketches, plans (plats in the US), charts, and maps. They were originally used to ensure reliable facts for land valuation and taxation. Cadastral survey information is often a base element in Geographic Information Systems (GIS) or Land Information Systems (LIS) used to assess and manage land and built infrastructure. Such systems are also employed on a variety of other tasks, for example, to track long-term changes over time for geological or ecological studies, where land tenure is a significant part of the scenario.

The cadastre is a fundamental source of data in disputes and lawsuits between landowners. Land registration and cadastre are both types of land recording and complement each other. Under his code, Napoleon established a comprehensive cadastral system for France that is regarded as the forerunner of most modern versions.

By allowing for the clear assignment of rights to property, and demarcating and delimiting parcels of land, cadasters have been credited with strengthening the financial independence of land owners, facilitating economic risk taking and in turn growth in output and employment, and improving state fiscal capacity (through, for example, improved tax collection and more properly valued real estate markets).

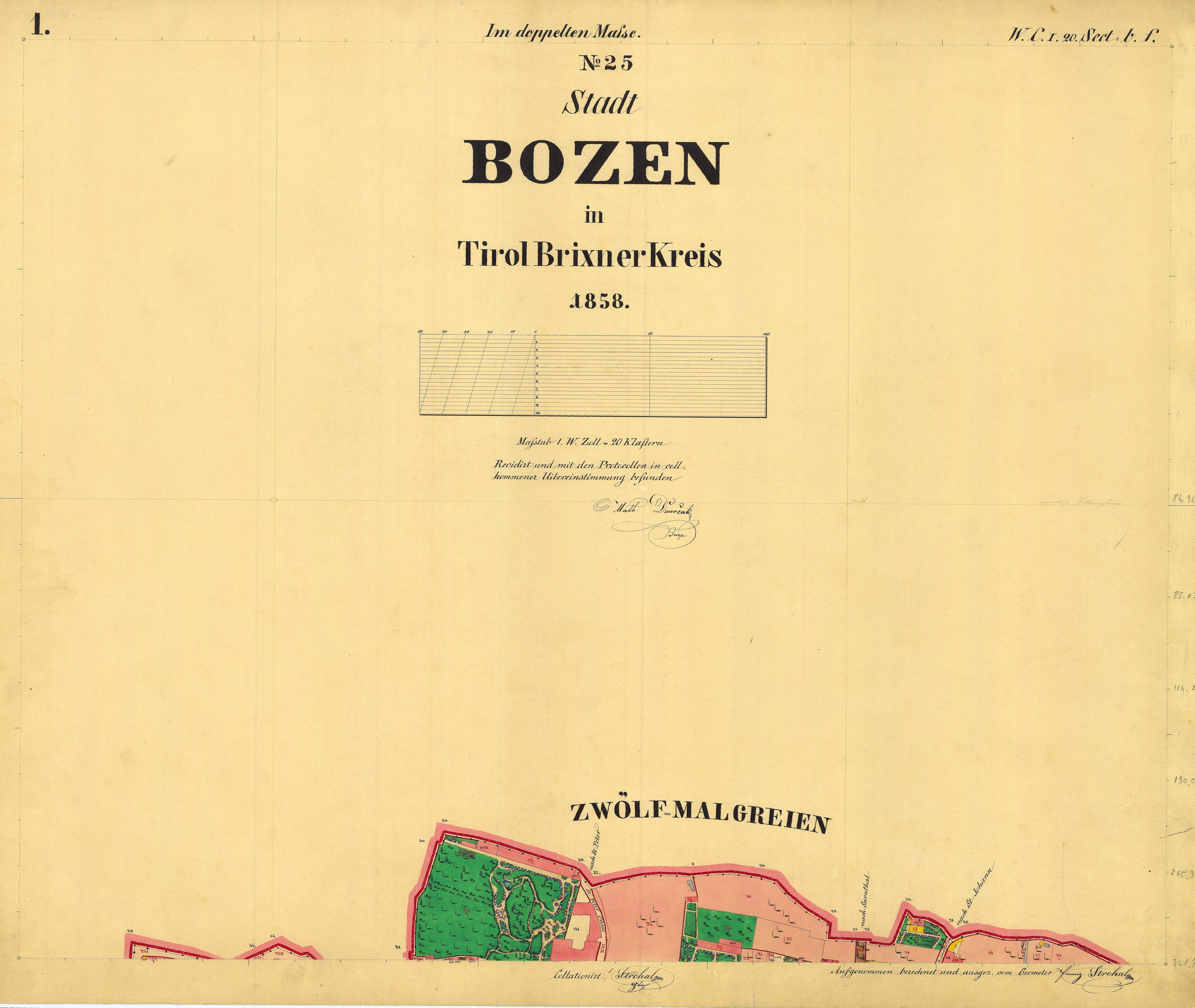
Cadastral map of Bozen, Tirol, Brixner Kreis Nr 1, 1858

== Etymology and definition ==
The word cadastre came into English through French from the Greek katástikhon (κατάστιχον), a list or register, from katà stíkhon (κατὰ στίχον)—literally, "(organised) line by line".

A cadastre commonly includes details of the ownership, the tenure, the precise location, the dimensions (and area), the cultivations if rural, and the value of individual parcels of land. Cadastres are used by many nations around the world, some in conjunction with other records, such as a title register.

The International Federation of Surveyors defines cadastre as follows:

A Cadastre is normally a parcel-based, and up-to-date land information system containing a record of interests in land (e.g. rights, restrictions and responsibilities). It usually includes a geometric description of land parcels linked to other records describing the nature of the interests, the ownership or control of those interests, and often the value of the parcel and its improvements.

== History ==
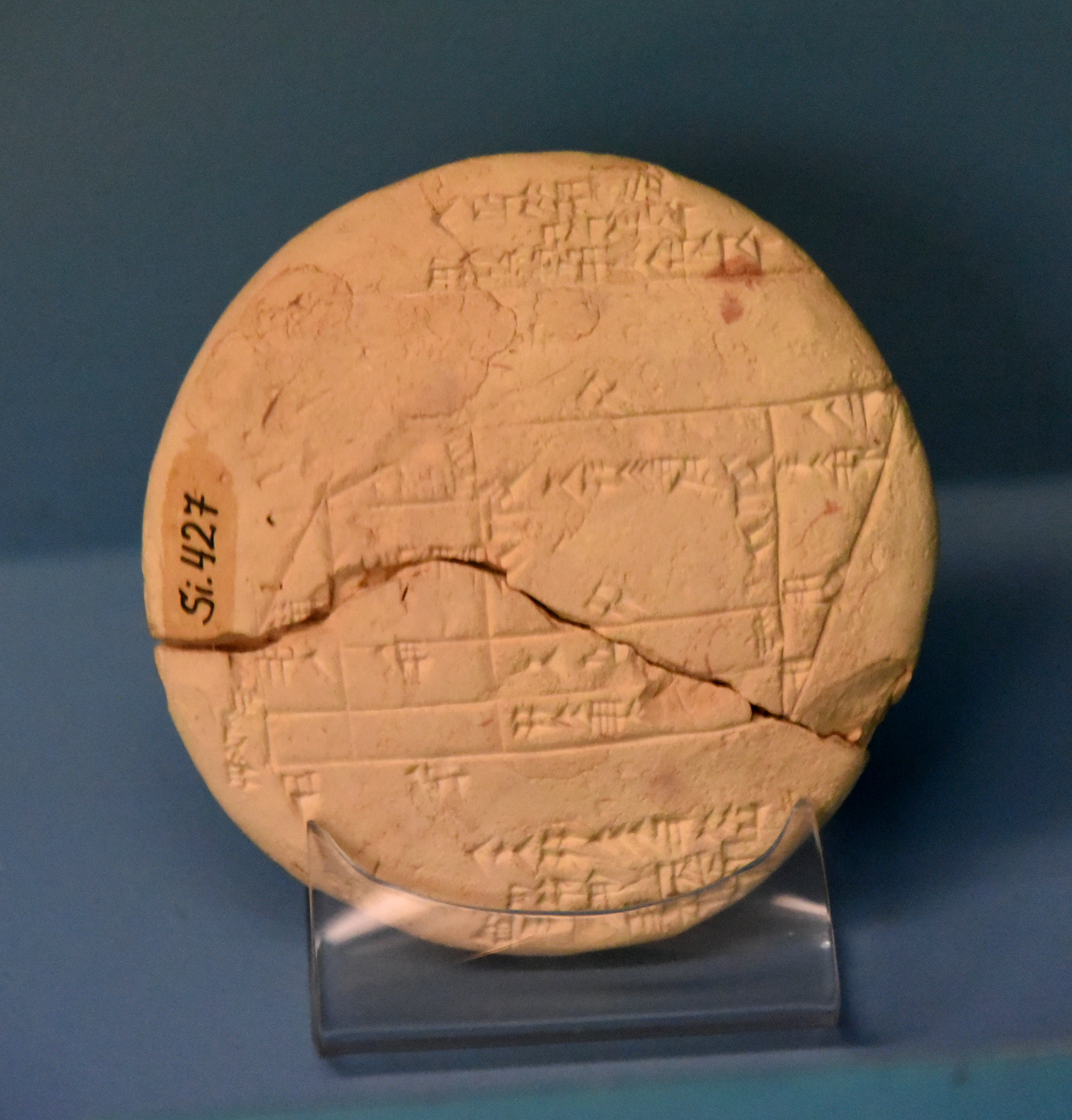
A cadastre text written in Akkadian on a terracotta tablet; from the 18th century BC in Sippar, Iraq, and held by the Ancient Orient Museum, Istanbul

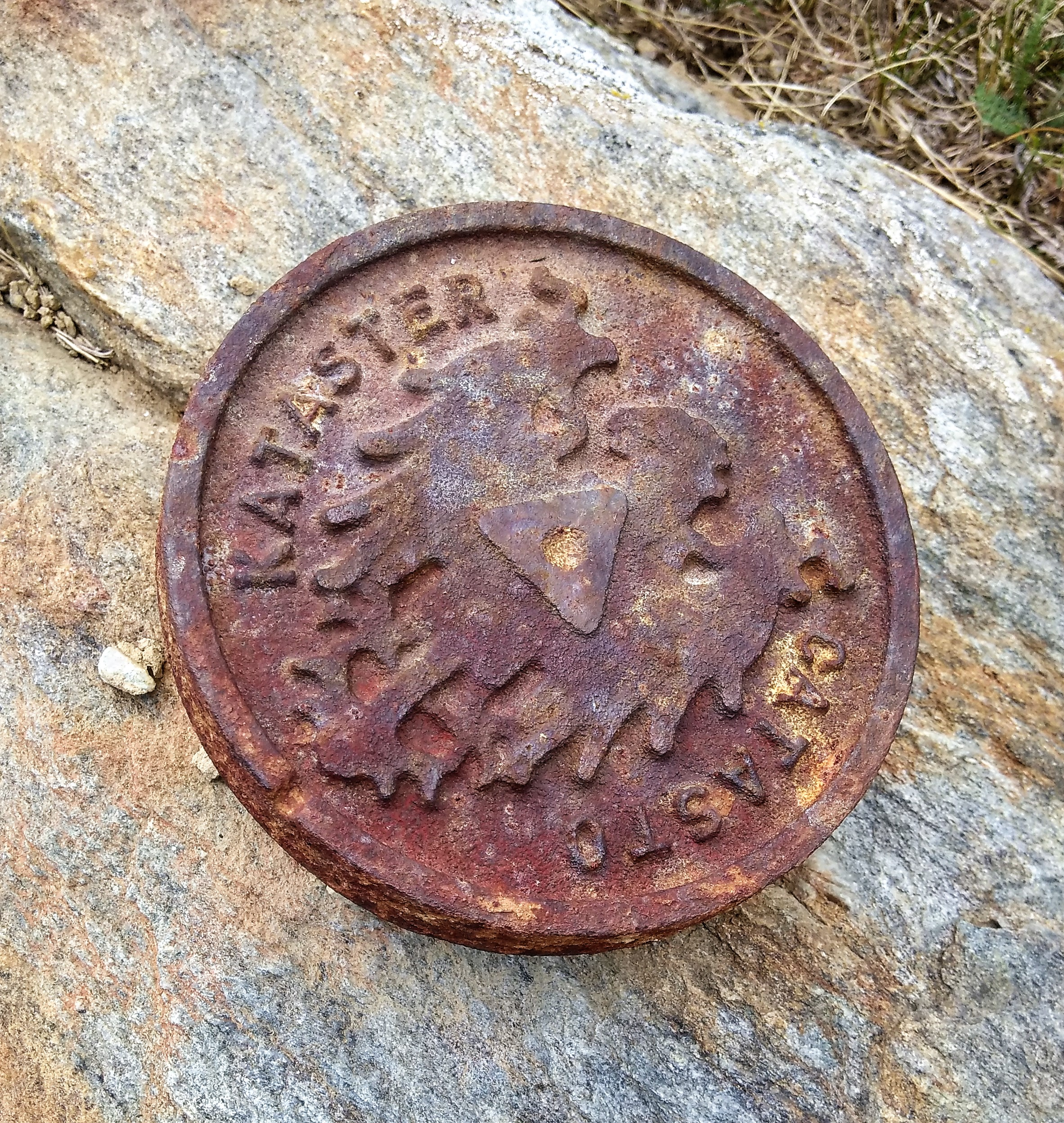
Cadastre survey marker from the South Tyrol mountains, 2018

Some of the earliest cadastres were ordered by Roman Emperors to recover state owned lands that had been appropriated by private individuals, and thereby recover income from such holdings. One such cadastre was done in AD 77 in Campania, a surviving stone marker of the survey reads "The Emperor Vespasian, in the eighth year of his tribunician power, so as to restore the state lands which the Emperor Augustus had given to the soldiers of Legion II Gallica, but which for some years had been occupied by private individuals, ordered a survey map to be set up with a record on each 'century' of the annual rental". In this way Vespasian was able to reimpose taxation formerly uncollected on these lands.

With the fall of Rome, the use of cadastral maps was effectively discontinued. Medieval practice used written descriptions of the extent of land rather than using more precise surveys. Only in the sixteenth and early seventeenth centuries did the use of cadastral maps resume, beginning in the Netherlands. With the emergence of capitalism in Renaissance Europe, the need for cadastral maps reemerged as a tool to determine and express control of land as a means of production. This took place first privately in land disputes and later spread to governmental practice as a means of more precise tax assessment.

== Surveys ==
Cadastral surveying is the sub-field of cadastre and surveying that specialises in the establishment and re-establishment of real property boundaries. It involves the physical delineation of property boundaries and determination of dimensions, areas and certain rights associated with properties. This is regardless of whether they are on land, water or defined by natural or artificial features. It is an important component of the legal creation of properties. A cadastral surveyor must apply both the spatial-measurement principles of general surveying and legal principles such as respect of neighboring titles.

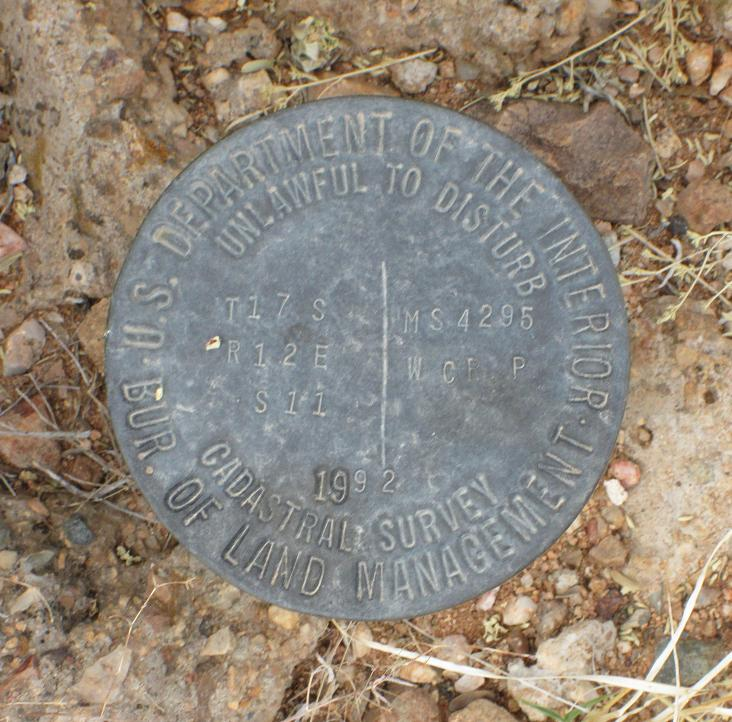
BLM cadastral survey marker from 1992 in San Xavier, Arizona

== Map ==
A cadastral map is a map that shows the boundaries and ownership of land parcels. Some cadastral maps show additional details, such as survey district names, unique identifying numbers for parcels, certificate of title numbers, positions of existing structures, section or lot numbers and their respective areas, adjoining and adjacent street names, selected boundary dimensions and references to prior maps.

James C. Scott, in Seeing Like a State, argues that all maps, but particularly cadastral maps, are designed to make local situations legible to an outsider, and in doing so, enable states to collect data on their subjects. He sees the origins of this in Early Modern Europe, where taxation became more complex. Cadastral maps, he argues, are always a great simplification, but they in themselves help change reality.

== Documentation ==
Cadastral documentation comprises the documentary materials submitted to cadastre or land administration offices for renewal of cadastral recordings. Cadastral documentation is kept in paper and/or electronic form. Jurisdiction statutes and further provisions specify the content and form of the documentation, as well as the person(s) authorized to prepare and sign the documentation, including concerned parties (owner, etc.), licensed surveyors and legal advisors. The office concerned reviews the submitted information; if the documentation does not comply with stated provisions, the office may set a deadline for the applicant to submit complete documentation.

The concept of cadastral documentation emerged late in the English language, as the institution of cadastre developed outside English-speaking countries. In a Danish textbook, one out of fifteen chapters regards the form and content of documents concerning subdivision and other land matters. Early textbooks of international scope focused on recordings in terms of land registration and technical aspects of cadastral survey, yet note that 'cadastral surveying has been carried out within a tight framework of legislation'. With the view of assessing transaction costs, a European project: Modelling real property transactions (2001–2005) charted procedures for the transfer of ownership and other rights in land and buildings. Cadastral documentation is described, e.g. for Finland as follows '8. Surveyor draws up cadastral map and cadastral documents … 10. Surveyor sends cadastral documents to cadastral authority.' In Australia, similar activities are referred to as 'lodgement of plans of subdivision at land titles offices'

== Management ==
Cadastre management has been used by the software industry since at least 2005. It mainly refers to the use of technology for management of cadastre and land information in geographic information systems, spatial data infrastructures and software architecture, rather than to general management issues of cadastral and other land information agencies.

== Cadastres in different jurisdictions ==
=== United Kingdom ===
In Scotland there is a Cadastral Map: Land Registration etc (Scotland) Act 2012. In 1836, Colonel Robert Dawson of the Royal Engineers proposed that a cadastre be implemented in light of his experiences on secondment to the Tithe Commission.

In England, Wales and Northern Ireland there is a system of land registration with similar functions, but the word "cadastre" is not used.

=== North America ===
In the United States, cadastral survey within the Bureau of Land Management (BLM) maintains records of all public lands. Such surveys often require detailed investigation of the history of land use, legal accounts, and other documents.

The Public Lands Survey System is a cadastral survey of the United States originating in legislation from 1785, after international recognition of the United States. The Dominion Land Survey is a similar cadastral survey conducted in Western Canada, begun in 1871 after the formation of Canada in 1867. Both cadastral surveys are made relative to principal meridian and baselines. These cadastral surveys divided the surveyed areas into townships. Some much earlier surveys in Ohio created 25 square mile townships when the design of the system was being explored. Later, the design became square land areas of approximately 36 square miles (six miles by six miles). These townships are divided into sections, each approximately one-mile square. Unlike in Europe, this cadastral survey largely preceded settlement and as a result greatly influenced settlement patterns. Properties are generally rectangular, boundary lines often run on cardinal bearings, and parcel dimensions are often in fractions or multiples of chains. Land descriptions in Western North America are principally based on these land surveys.

== Extensions ==
Extensions of the conventional cadastre concept include the 3D cadastre, considering the vertical domain; and the multipurpose cadastre, considering non-parcel data.

According to the UN Economic Commission for Europe, a "Marine Cadastre describes the location and spatial extent of rights, restrictions and responsibilities in the marine environment". Marine cadastres apply the same governance principles to the water. They help further conservation and sustainability efforts. This is especially a concern in Europe's large aquatic market. In Australia, they are used by many parties to plan around legal, technical, and institutional considerations. A related concept is that of marine spatial data infrastructures.

== See also ==
- Assessor's parcel number
- Boundary (real estate)
- Cadastral community
- Cadastral divisions of Australia
- Defter (Ottoman Empire)
- Estate (house)
- Forest inventory
- Geographic information system (GIS)
- Kadaster (Netherlands)
- Land administration
- Land (economics)
- Land grant
- Land registry of Bertier de Sauvigny
- Land tenure and registration
- Real property
- Recorder of deeds
- Surveying
- Web mapping
