= Cadastral community =

Central European type of municipality

A cadastral community (also referred to as a cadastral municipality, commune, or unit) is a cadastral subdivision of municipalities in several Central European nations, including Austria, Bosnia and Herzegovina, Croatia, the Czech Republic, Serbia, Slovakia, Slovenia, the Netherlands, and parts of Italy. (Note: South Tyrol, Trentino, Gorizia, and Trieste) The community records property ownership in a cadastre, which is a public register that legally defines real estate boundaries and ownership for tax and legal purposes.

The concept and its common etymology originate from the German term Katastralgemeinde (KG; literally "cadastral municipality" or "cadastral community") used in the successor states of the former Habsburg monarchy. The historical name in Czech and Slovak, katastrální obec, was formally changed to katastrální území ("cadastral area" or "cadastral territory") in 1928, although the former term still shares the same common root as the Croatian (katastarska općina) and Slovene (katastralna občina) names. The concept existed in the past in Hungary (kataszteri község).

== History ==
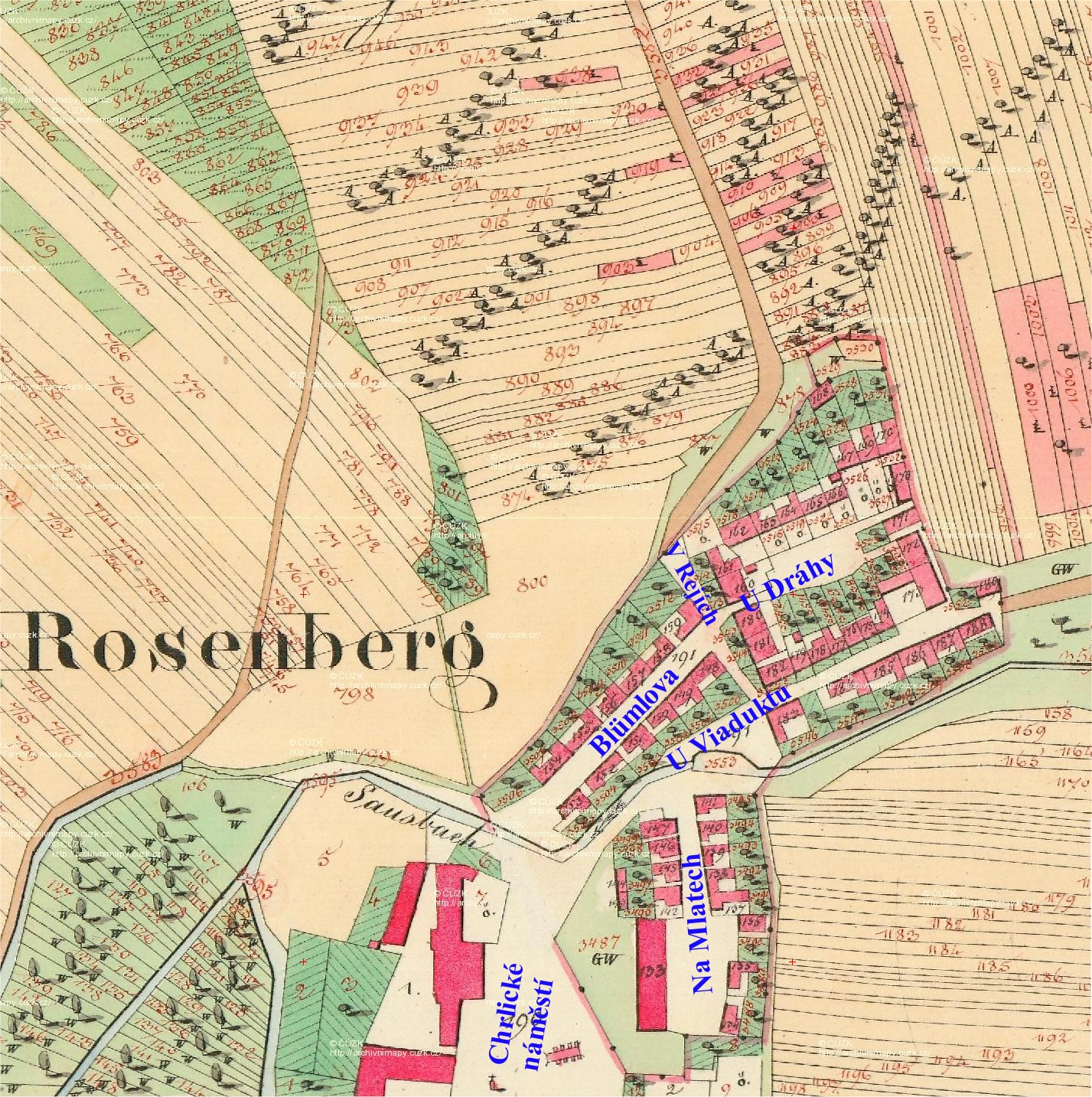
Cadastral map of Roznberk in present-day Brno-Chrlice

In 1764, at the behest of Empress Maria Theresa, a complete survey of the Habsburg lands was begun, initiated by the general staff of the Imperial and Royal Army under Field Marshal Count Leopold Joseph von Daun, who had become aware of the lack of reliable maps in the Seven Years' War. Maria Theresa's son Emperor Joseph II ordered the implication of a complete urbarium for property tax purposes in 1785. The present-day cadastre was completed after the Napoleonic Wars from 1817 onwards under Emperor Francis I of Austria (Franziszeischer Kataster). Since then, the Austrian (i.e. Cisleithanian) crown lands were subdivided in Katastralgemeinden; surveying in the Hungarian (Transleithanian) lands started in 1850. Municipalities as administrative subdivisions with certain rights of self-governance were not established until after the 1848 revolutions.

Most of the nowadays Katastralgemeinden once had been independent communes and were incorporated on the occasion of a municipal territory reforms. They can be further divided into smaller villages and localities (Ortschaften). There were 7,847 Katastralgemeinden in Austria in 2014. For land registration, the unit identifier used in a Katastralgemeinde is "KG-Nr" (KG-Nummer, or number).

The Dutch system of kadastrale gemeenten was set up around 1830. When municipalities are merged, often the cadastral communes remain as they were, so one civil municipality can consist of more than one cadastral commune; but again, a cadastral commune can never be part of more than one civil municipality.

== See also ==
- Districts of Vienna
- Municipalities of South Tyrol
- Municipalities of Slovenia
- Municipalities of Croatia
- Municipality (Austria)
