= Franziszeischer cadastre =

Austrian real estate cadastre

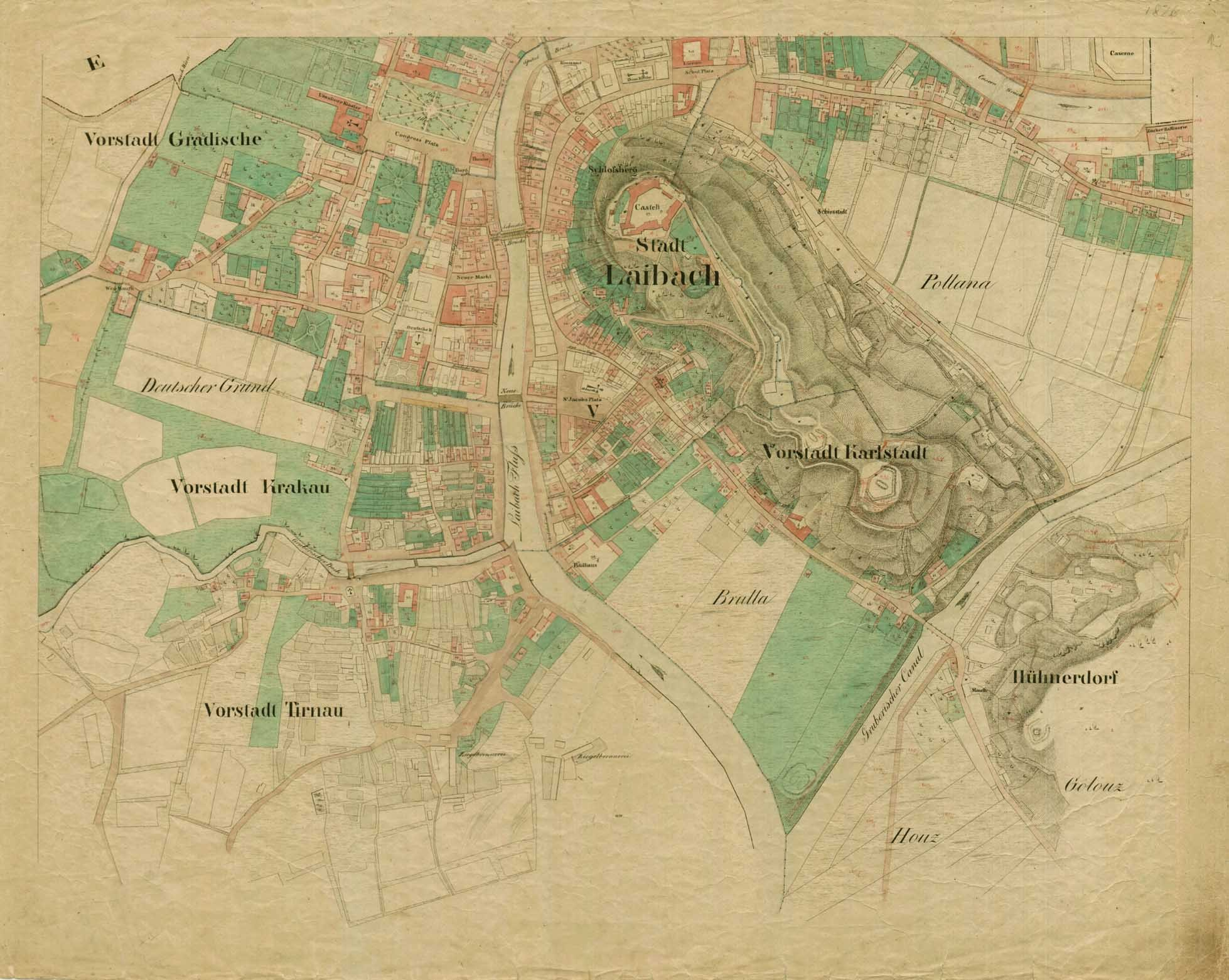
Ljubljana 1826, partially uncolored and without property numbers

The Franziszeische Kataster, also known as the Franciszäischer Kataster, is the first complete Austrian real estate cadastre, recording land parcels of the Austrian Empire. Often called the Grundkataster, Steuerkataster, or Grundsteuerkataster, it was created between the 1810s and 1870s and named after Emperor Franz I.

The Franziszeische Kataster differs from the Franziszeische (2.) Landesaufnahme (Franziska land survey), conducted concurrently. The cadastre aimed to establish a uniform basis for property tax assessment, while the land survey served primarily military purposes (military geography).

The cadastre has underpinned land registers in Austria for over 200 years, forming the foundation for the property database, digital cadastral map, and other surveying aids in successor states of the Habsburg Monarchy. In states partially within the monarchy, such as Romania (covering only Transylvania and Bukovina), detailed land registers were absent elsewhere until the late 20th century. In Italy, distinct land registry systems persist: the Austrian cadastral system is used in Bolzano, Trento, Gorizia, Trieste, and parts of Udine north of Strassoldo near Cervignano del Friuli.

== Fundamentals ==
The cadastre, created between 1817 and 1861, is named after Emperor Franz I, who initiated the survey through the Land Tax Patent of December 23, 1817. It initially covered the Austrian lands (Cisleithania), mapping 300,082 km² on hand-drawn, colored sheets measuring 20 × 25 inches (≈ 53 × 66 cm). Each sheet covers 500 yokes, with approximately 50 million properties in 30,000 cadastral municipalities recorded on 164,357 map sheets. Austria's current territory is covered on 53,212 sheets.

Cadastral maps use a scale of one Austrian inch to 40 fathoms (1:2880), (Note: A ratio of 26.340053333 millimeters to (40 × 1.896483840 m =) 75.8593536 meters, thus 1:2880. Rounding differences are not relevant given the line thicknesses, paper irregularities, and margin of error in manual measurement.) based on the contemporary military scale of 1 inch to 1000 steps (1:28,800). (Note: An old Austrian mile of 7.585935360 km had 10,000 steps, 4,000 fathoms, and thus 288,000 inches. 1 fathom = 6 feet. 1 foot = 12 inches, therefore: 1 inch on a map in “military measure” = 1000 steps = 400 fathoms = 400 × 6 feet = 400 × 6 × 12 inches = 28,800 inches and thus a tenth of a mile in nature.) Local areas were mapped at 1:1440 or, rarely, 1:720, and mountainous areas at 1:5760. Lengths are in inches and fathoms, areas in square fathoms or yards, with one square inch equaling one yard in reality. (Note: 1 inch on the map = 40 fathoms in nature. 40 × 40 = 1600. One yoke = 1600 square fathoms.) Post-1870, metric scales were added to older maps. The cadastral register lists properties, owners, houses, real estate, land ownership, cultivated land, reed beds, and name directories.

The Hungarian lands (Transleithania: Hungary, Transylvania, Croatia, etc.) were surveyed from 1850 without colored sheets, covering 670,000 km².

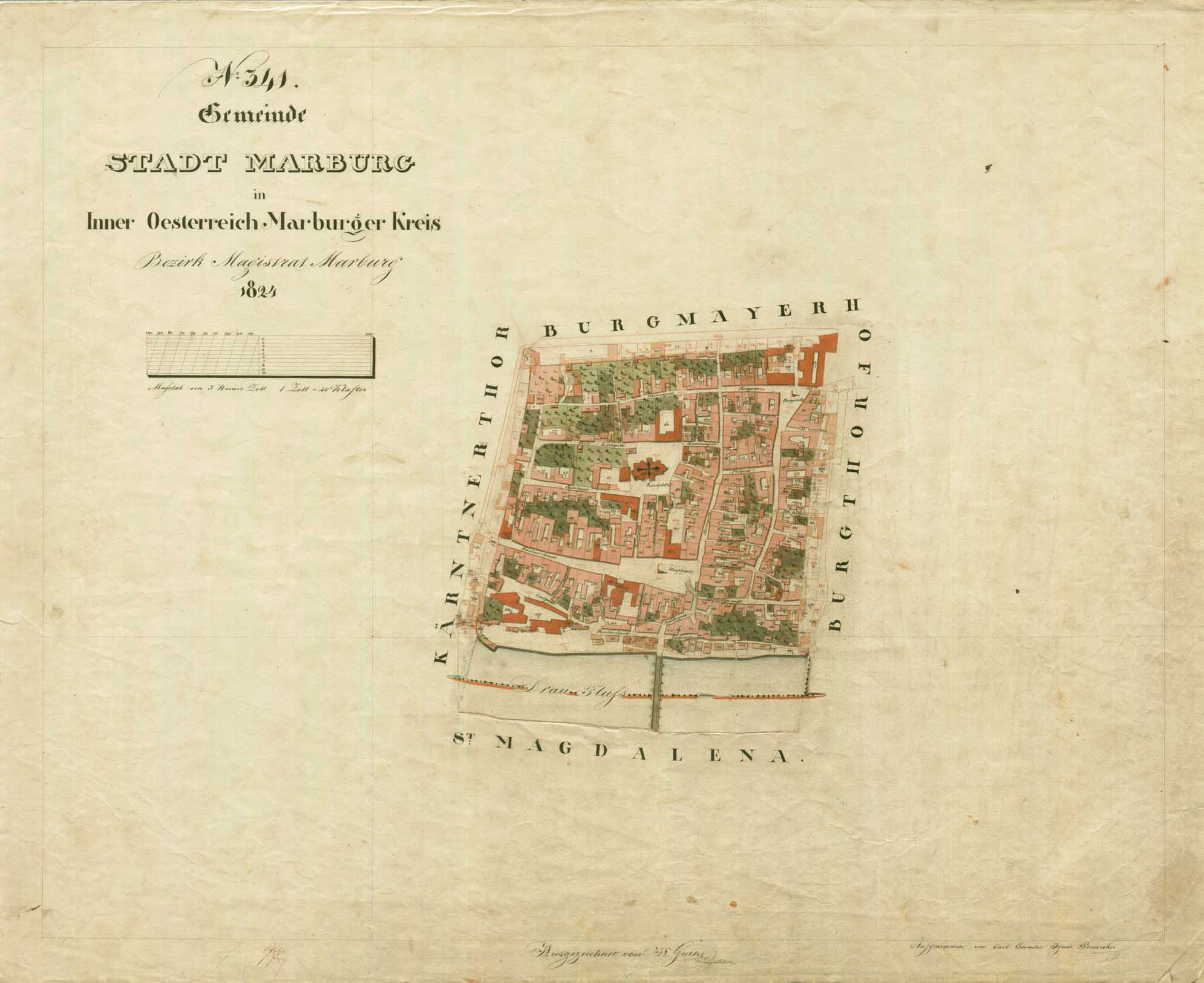
Marburg an der Drau in 1824

Predecessors include tax assessments (Note: Also known as Fassionen, Steuerrectifikationen, Theresianische Fassion, Theresianischer Kataster, or Theresianisches Gültbuch) under Maria Theresa and the Josephinisches Lagebuch of Joseph II (1785–1789), (Note: Josephinian land register, Josephinian fashion, or Josephinian cadastre) based on his tax and urbarial patent. Abolished in 1790, it served as a provisional land tax until the Franziszeische Kataster. Preparatory work began in 1806, formalized by the Grundsteuerpatent of December 23, 1817, which taxed land based on yield, not ownership or effort, ensuring a stable tax burden independent of weather or diligence. It recorded parcels, cadastral communities, provinces, and the entire empire.

== Survey procedure ==
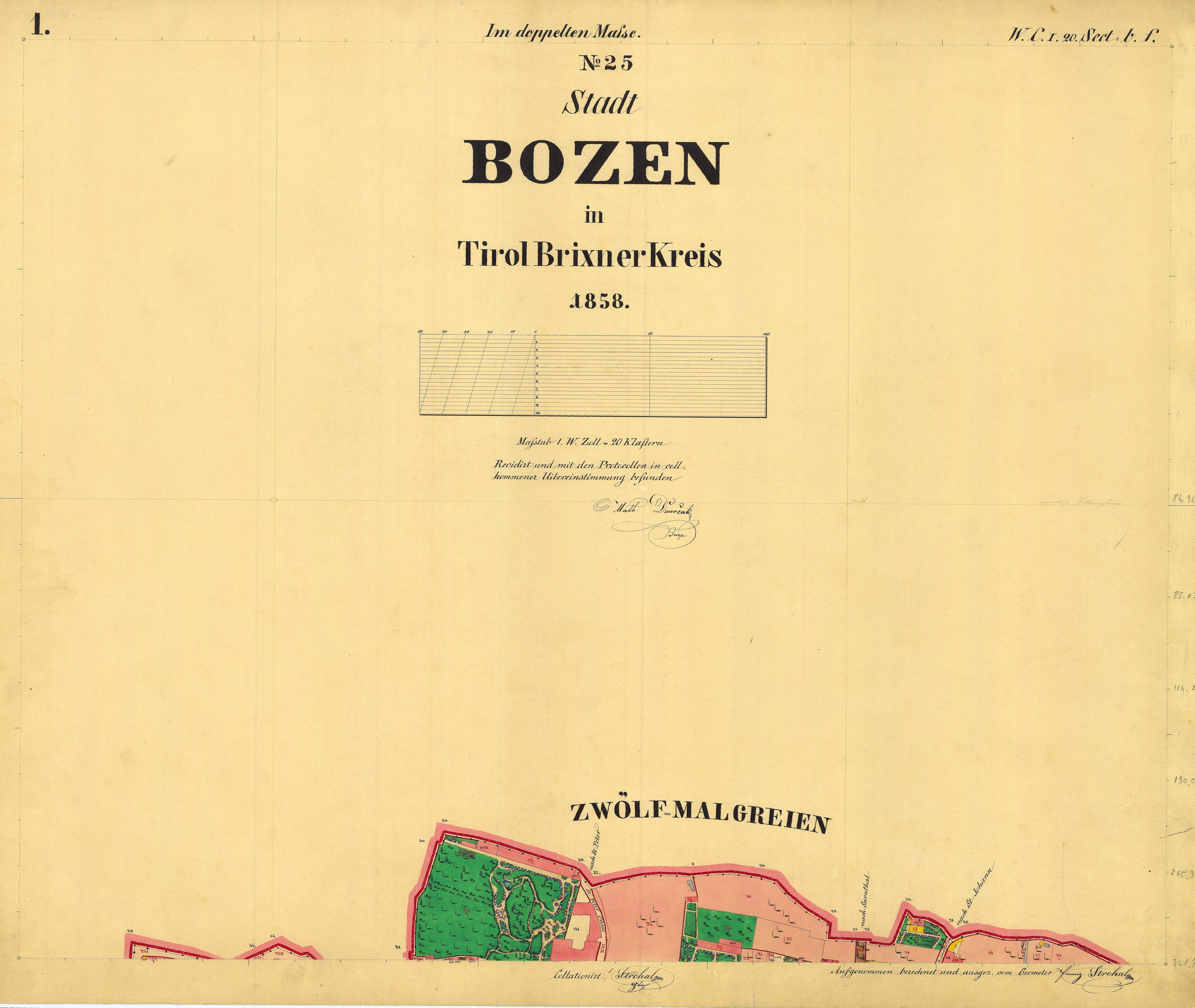
Sheet 1 of the cadastral survey of Bolzano, 1858

Land parcels in each cadastral municipality were recorded using trial table surveys by the military, adopting advanced methods as work progressed. Survey periods for modern Austria include:

- Vienna and Lower Austria: 1817–1824
- Upper Austria and Salzburg: 1823–1830
- Styria: 1820–1825
- Carinthia: 1822–1828
- Burgenland (then German West Hungary): 1853–1858
- Tyrol and Vorarlberg: 1855–1861

Without initial triangulation, local coordinate systems were established with origins at:

- South tower of St. Stephen's Cathedral for Vienna, Lower Austria, Moravia, and Austrian Silesia
- Gusterberg near Kremsmünster for Upper Austria, Salzburg, and Bohemia
- Schöckl near Graz for Styria
- Krimberg near Ljubljana for Carinthia, Carniola, and the Coastal Region
- South tower of the parish church in Innsbruck for Tyrol and Vorarlberg
- East tower of the Budapest observatory for Hungary, including Burgenland

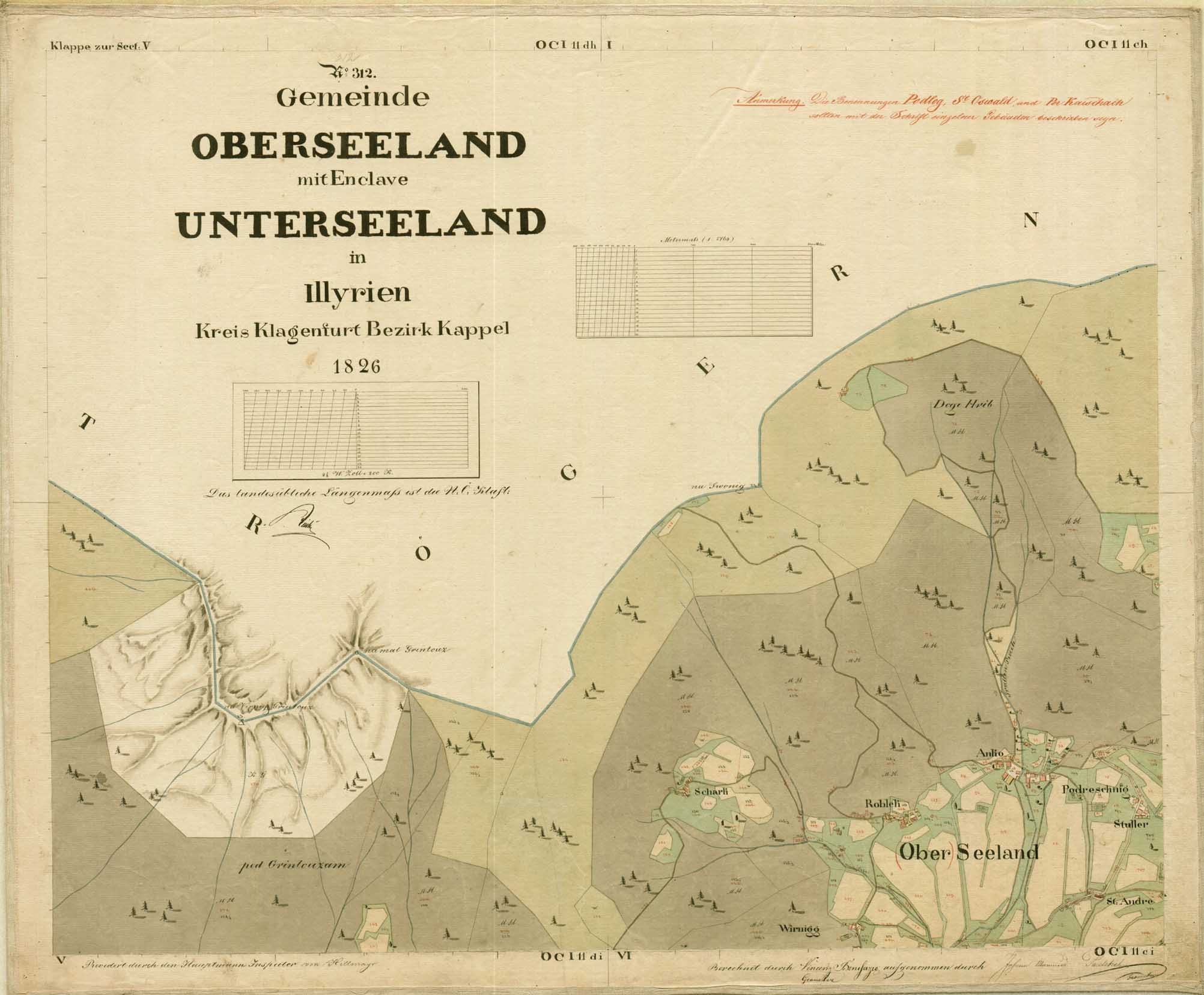
Seeland, south of Trögern in Eisenkappel-Vellach, 1826, then in the Kingdom of Illyria, now Slovenia (Koroška)

Municipal boundaries were defined in a boundary sketch. Landowners marked property boundaries with stones, pegs, cairns, or pits and distinguished land use types (meadows, fields, vineyards, etc.). Surveyors recorded these boundaries, simplifying crop boundaries within properties while preserving shape and area. Less emphasis was placed on tax-free or low-taxed areas, and minor buildings were sometimes omitted.

Data, including ownership, were recorded in a "field sketch," detailed in an "indication sketch," and finalized in winter. Plot numbers were assigned after commission re-surveying. The 1824 Cadastral Survey Instruction (KVI) guided the process, with surveyors financing equipment and liable for errors. The 1883 Cadastral Evidence Act mandated triennial reviews.

Initially, building plots used black numbers, others red. From 1865, uniform black numbering was adopted, with building plots prefixed by a dot (e.g., ".21" vs. "21"), a convention persisting in modern land registers, potentially causing confusion.

== Original folder ==
The cadastre's core, the "original folder," contains hand-colored drawings in a cardboard cover, with surveyors' names and a title page detailing location, administrative affiliation, and scales. Smaller municipalities may share folders.

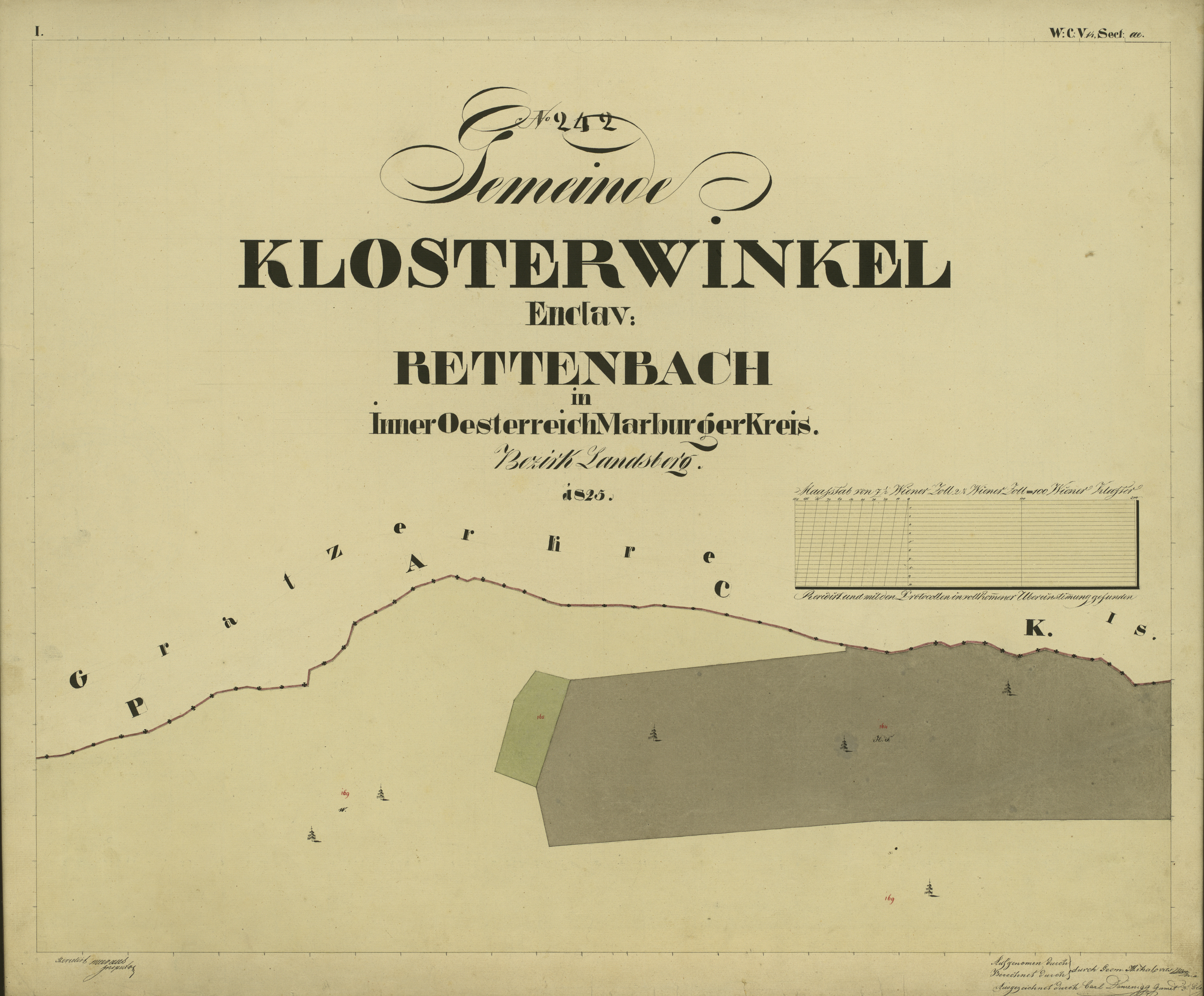
Folder for two cadastral municipalities: Municipality of Kloster, cadastral municipalities of Rettenbach and Klosterwinkel

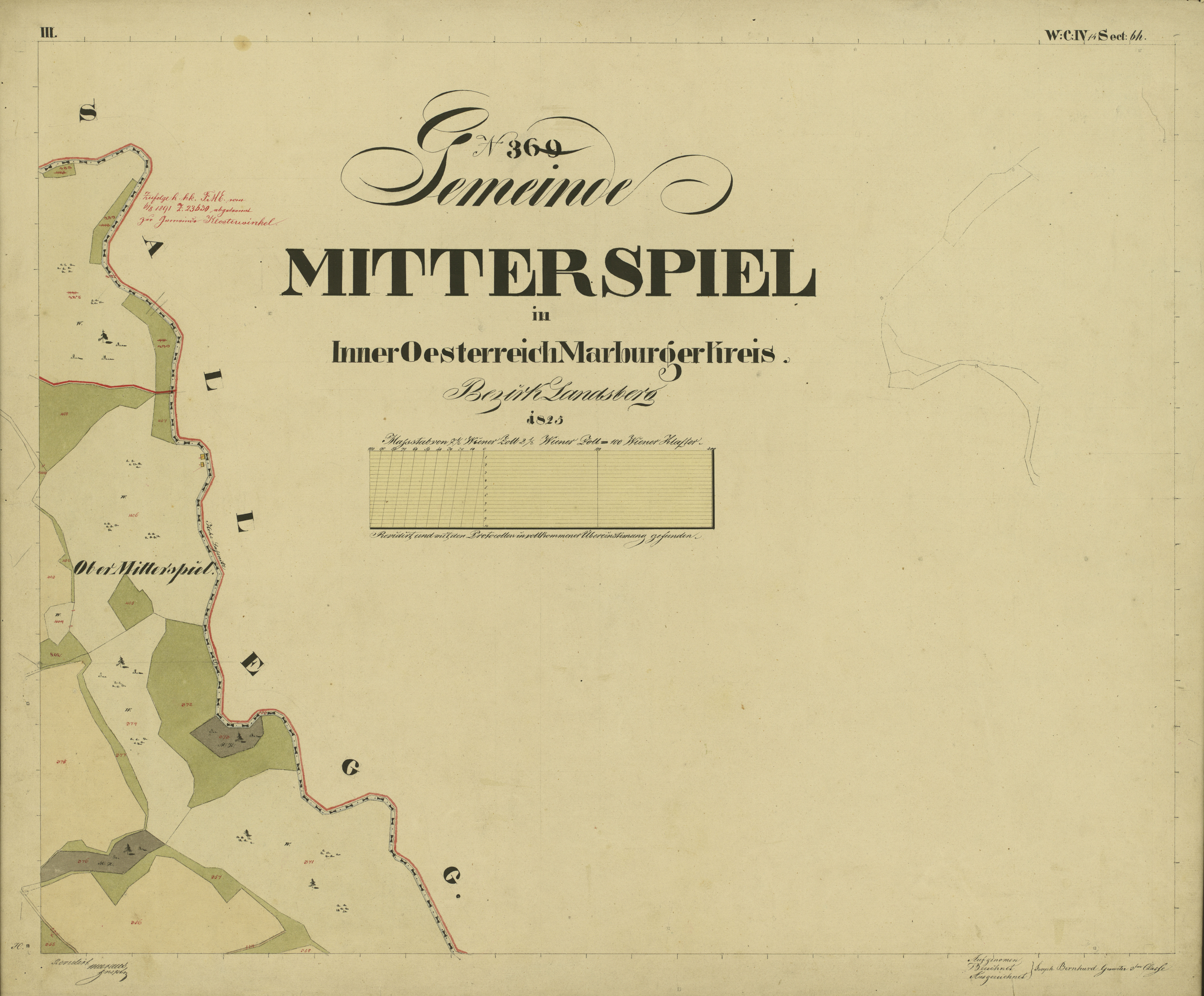
Municipality of Freiland, cadastral municipality of Mitterspiel, with handwritten addendum regarding a territorial change

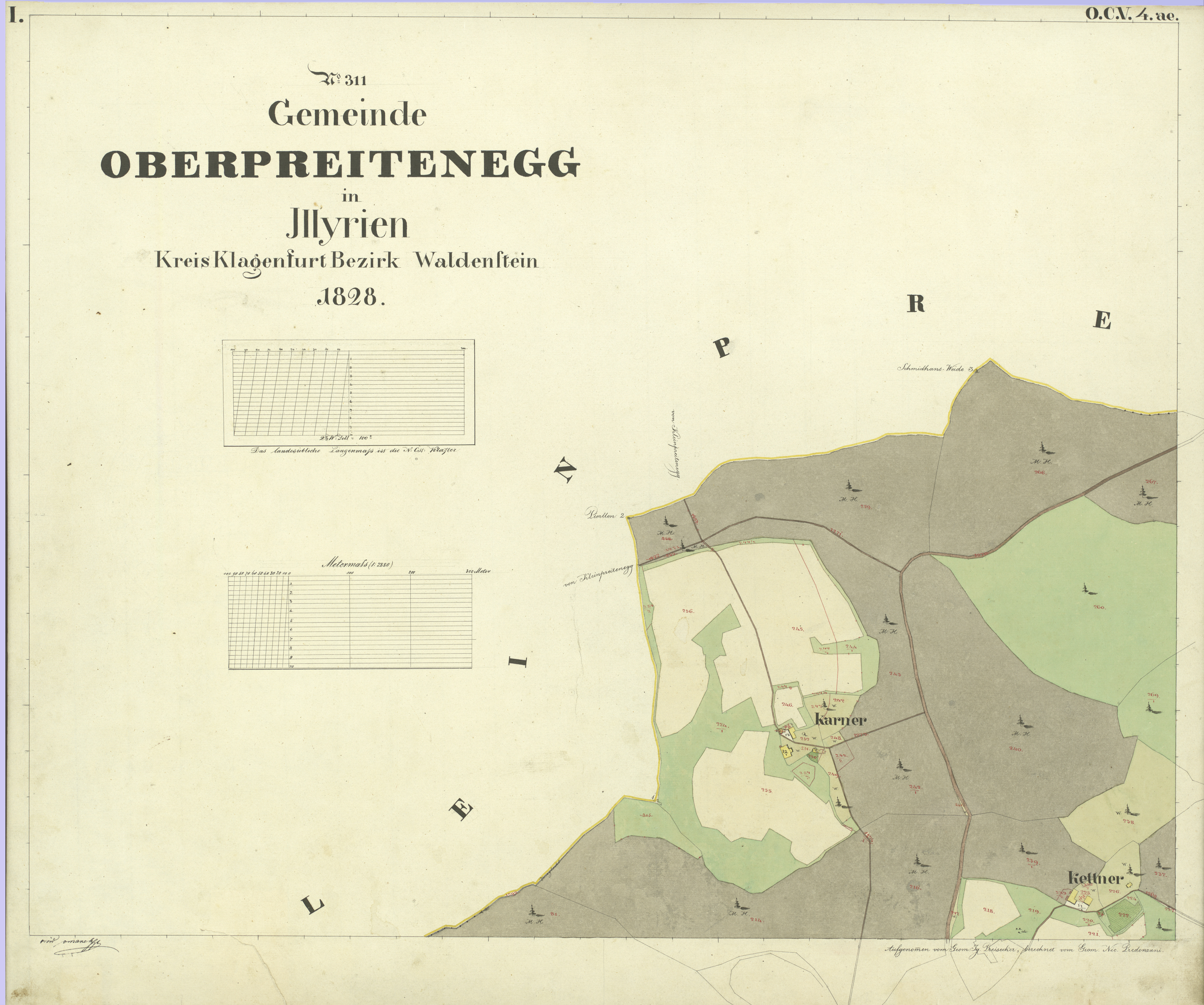
Municipality of Oberpreitenegg with its administrative structure in 1828: District of Waldenstein, Kingdom of Illyria

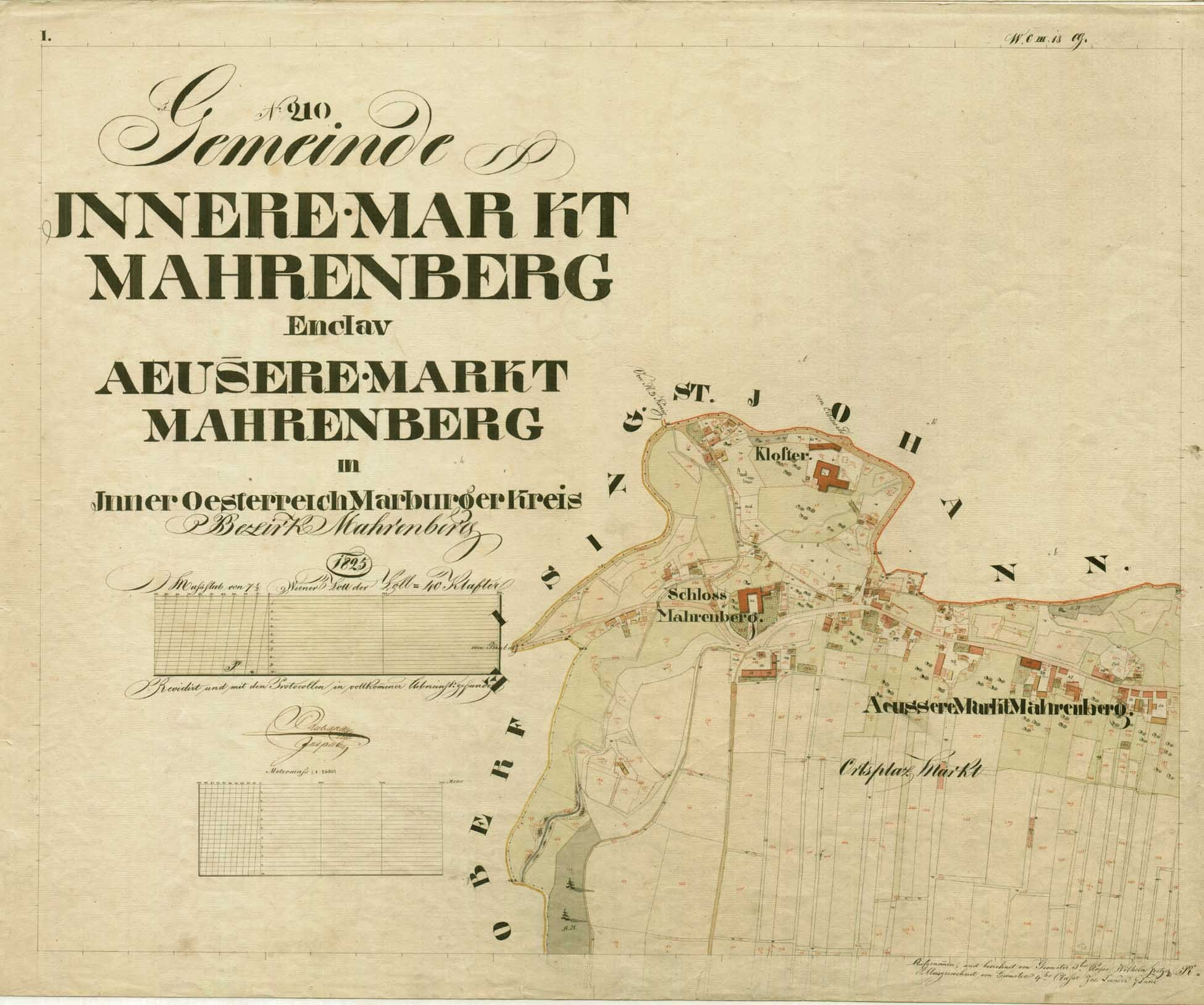
Municipality of Mahrenberg in the Drau Valley, Lower Styria, scale added later in metric units

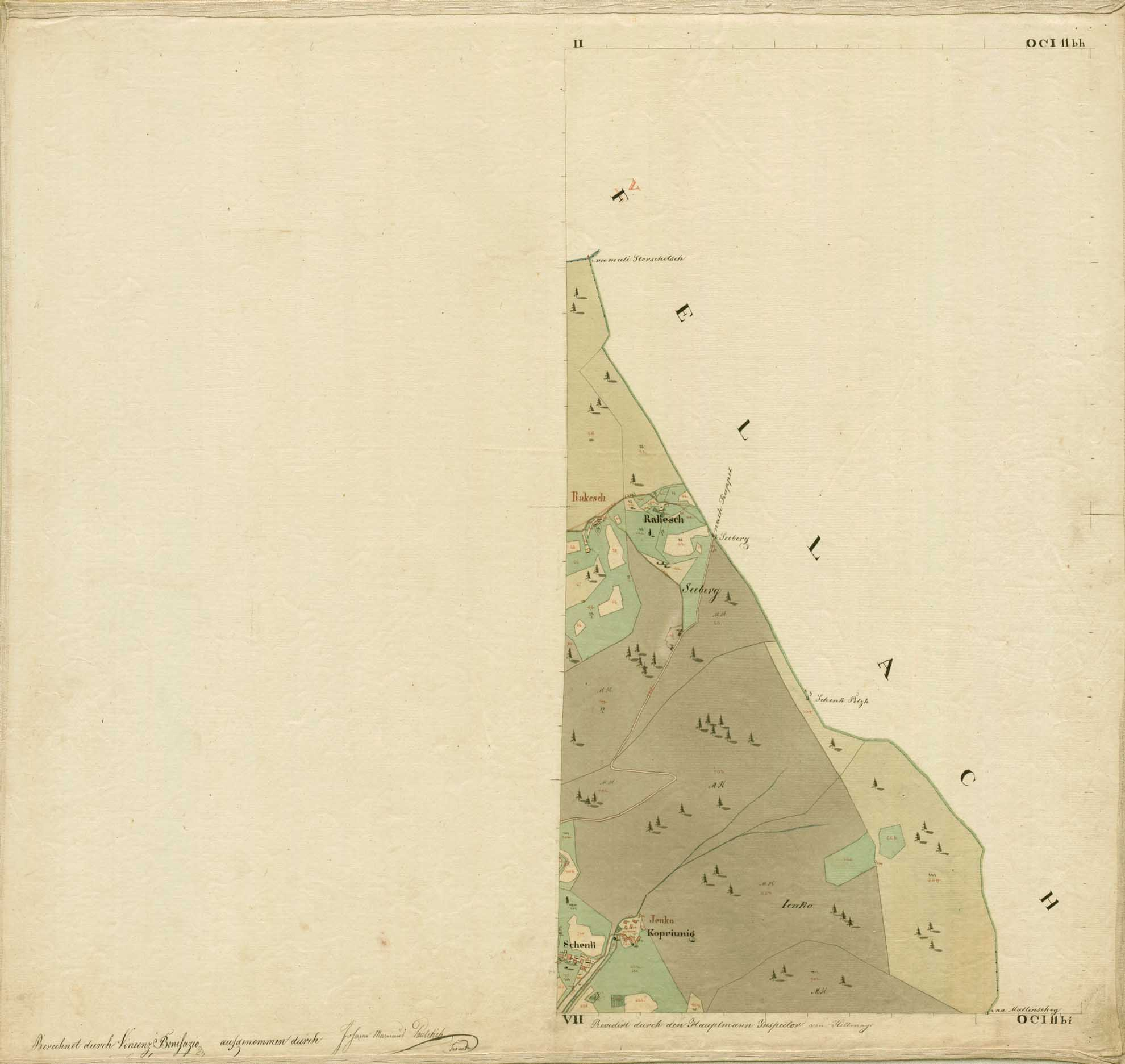
Southern slope at Seebergsattel, 1826, Seeland

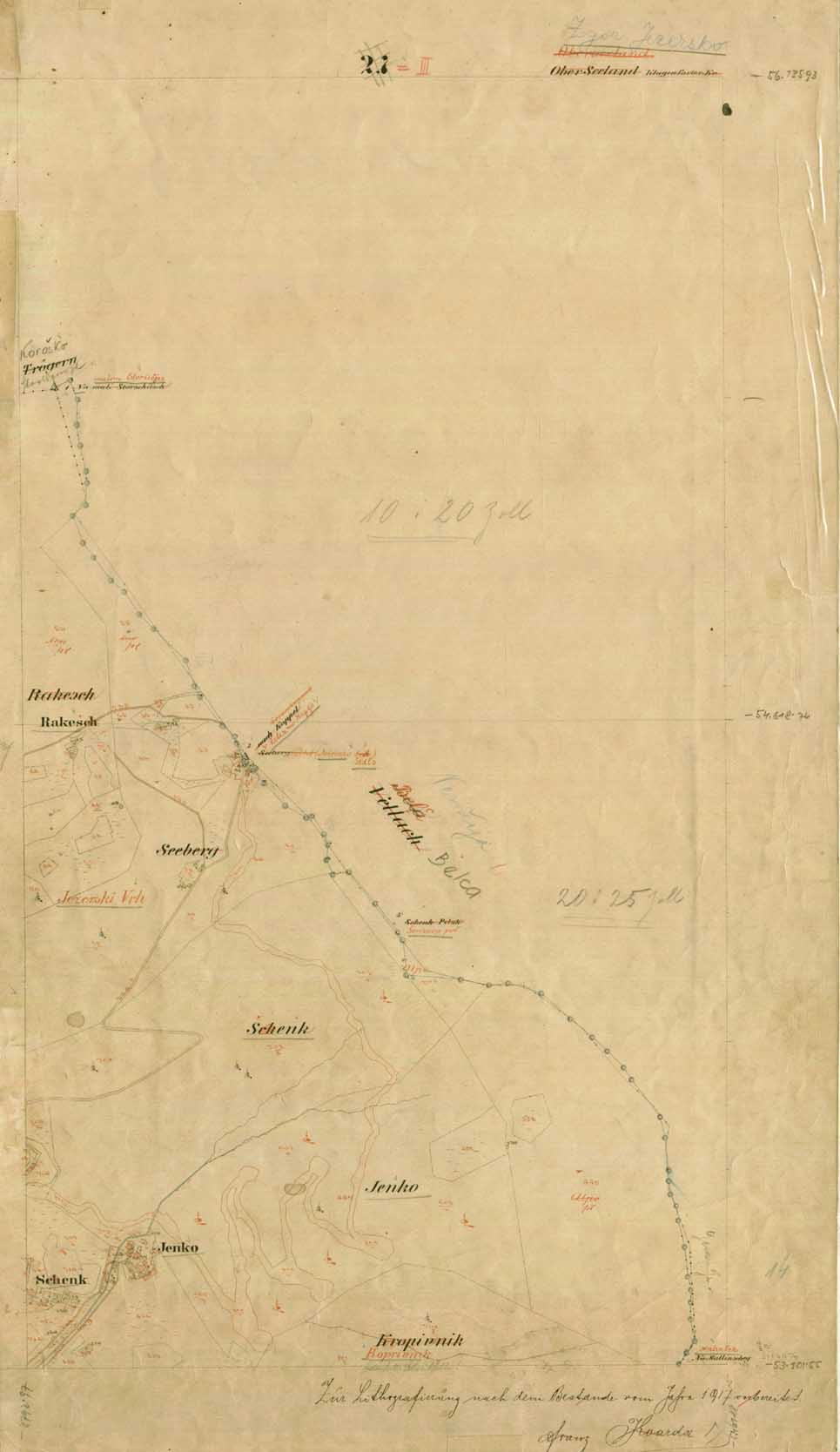
Working copy for Seebergsattel southern slope for the 1917 print edition

After the monarchy's dissolution, cadastral records were transferred to successor states (Italy, Slovenia, Hungary, Slovakia, Czechia, Poland, Croatia, Romania, Ukraine). Austria's original map is held at the Federal Office of Metrology and Surveying in Vienna, protected under the Hague Convention, viewable only with supervision and gloves. Yellow stains on map backs are from egg white glue, not dirt.

Duplicates in state archives vary in sheet numbering and layout, often omitting "flaps" (appendices). Rectification versions and city compilations reflect later updates, some uncolored. Lithographic prints may lack full details.

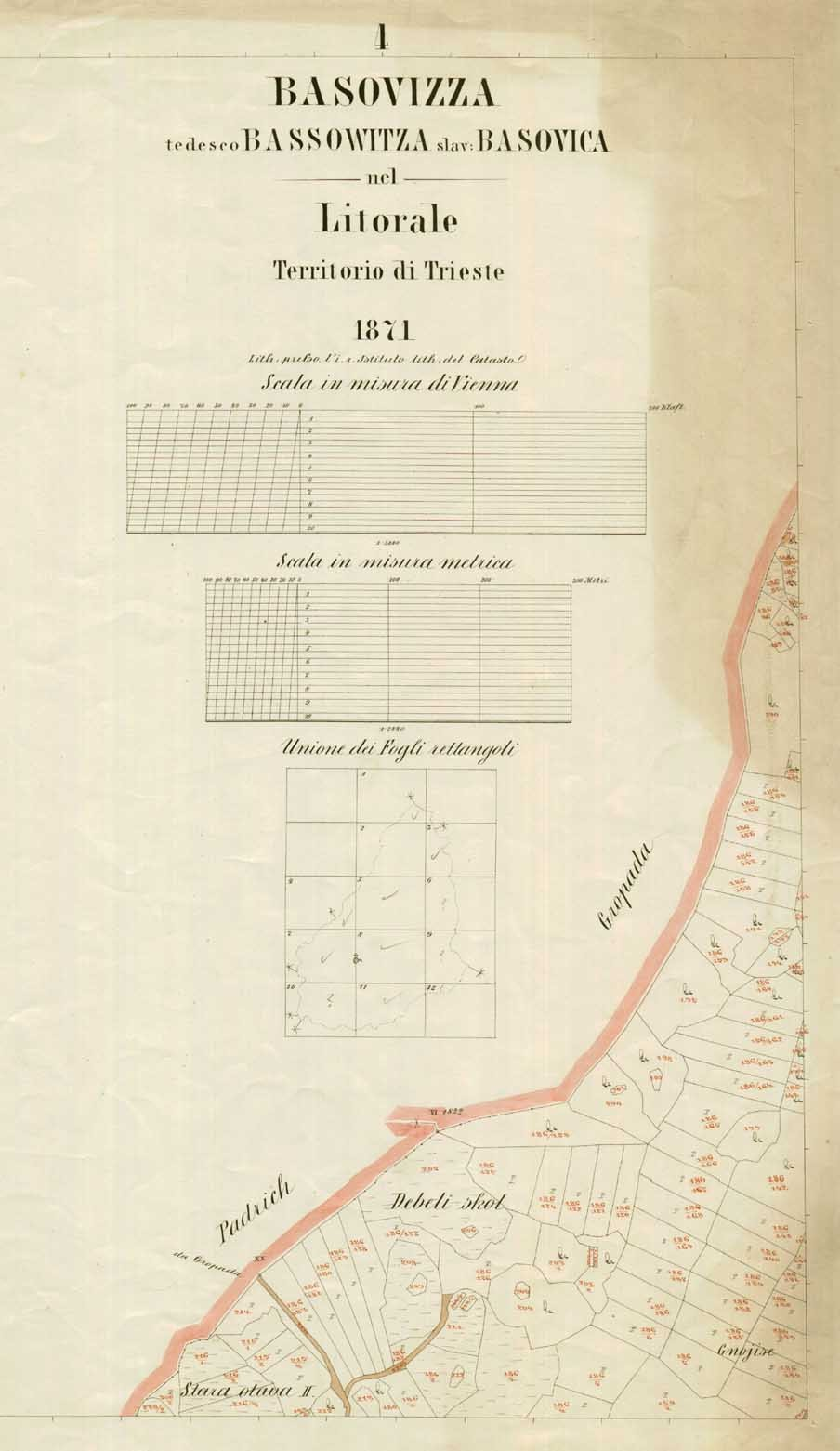
Later cadastral maps are simpler: title page of Basovizza near Trieste, 1871

The Austrian Urmappe is largely digitized. By 2008, the Federal Office of Metrology and Surveying planned to digitize all sheets, each 20–30 megabytes at 300 dpi. Linked image files are edited, often reduced in quality.

== Accuracy and reliability ==
The cadastre focuses on the valuation of real estate: all plots of land are recorded, even if they were unproductive (barren), as well as information about the type of construction of houses: wooden houses are coloured yellow, stone houses pink, and public buildings (churches, offices, etc.) red. Pasture land is divided into communal pasture (GW) and pasture (W) and coloured pale green. Meadows are coloured a stronger shade of green. Fields are light brown and vineyards are coloured pink. In addition to the colour, the crops are indicated by small symbols (vines, chestnut trees, etc.).

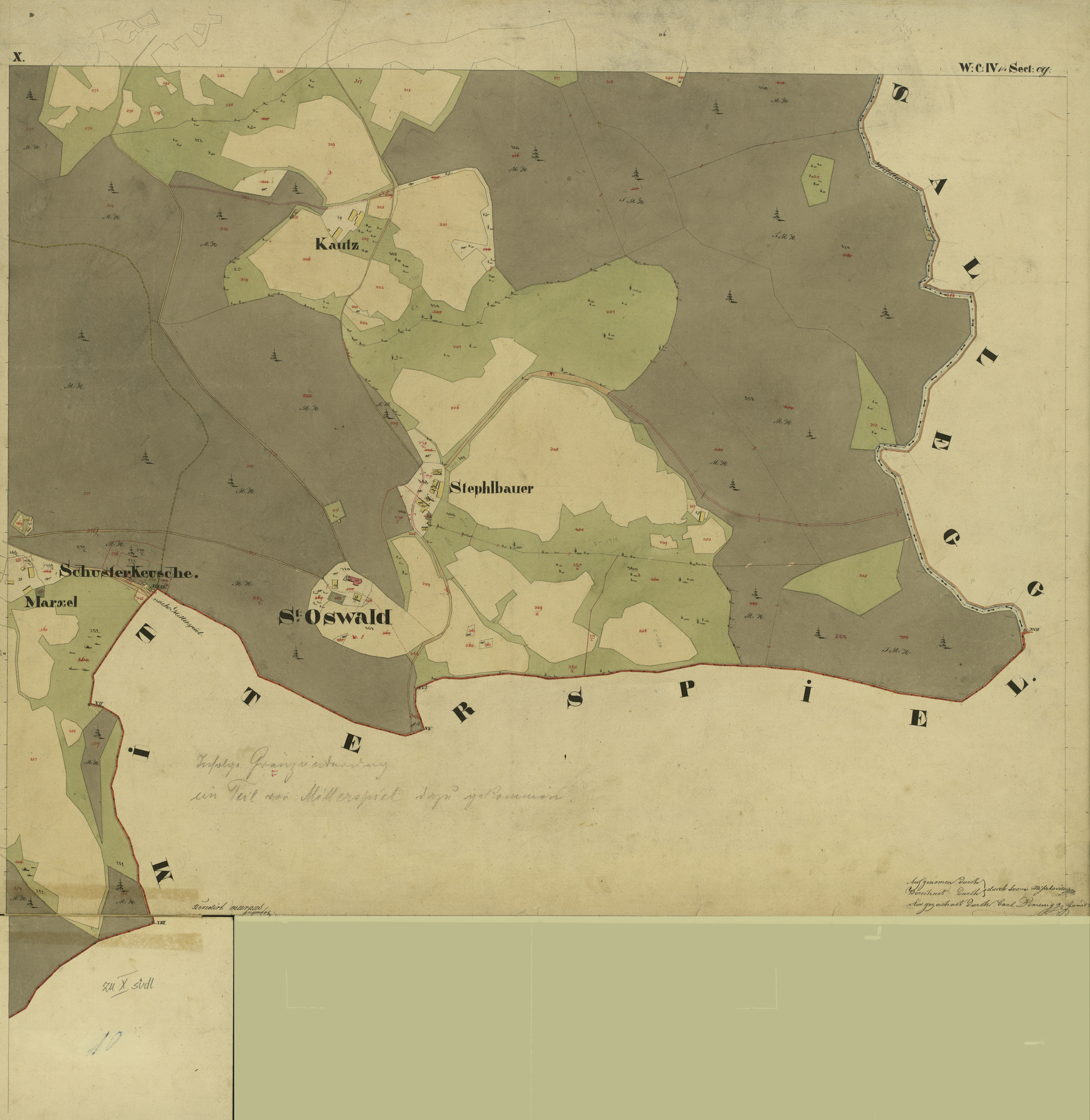
Original map with subsequent route entries and handwritten note about the change to the municipal boundary, municipality of Kloster

Updating the cadastre already encountered major difficulties in the 19th century: there was no guarantee that changes in the property portfolio would actually be passed on to the cadastral authorities, and apart from that, constant updating of the sheets was almost impossible due to low staffing levels. In addition, when land areas were separated and subsequently measured more accurately according to later rules, previous errors had a greater impact on the remaining land (remaining area problem): If 500 m² are precisely measured and separated from a plot of land measuring 1000 m² (according to the cadastre), which in reality only measures 980 m² (2% error), 480 m² remain as 'residual area' (4%, thus double the error). If the completeness of this residual area is decisive for the existence of a right (e.g. private hunting rights, 200 yokes = 115 ha), this can lead to the loss of this right. Courts have repeatedly rejected liability on the part of cadastral authorities for such errors, pointing out that the aim of the cadastre is not to provide a binding representation of areas.

The cadastral maps are not a substitute for land maps: transport links and streams are usually only marked if the road or stream bed forms its own plot of land (parcel). In the original map, this is only the case for state roads (chausseen) and other important connecting routes. In later editions of the cadastral map, more emphasis was placed on showing these connections (see, for example, the changes marked in red in the image on the right around St. Oswald's Church and around the Stephlbauer farm). Changes to municipal boundaries are noted by hand in the original map.

The cadastral register does not contain any information on elevation, such as fixed points, contour lines, hatching or shading, nor does it contain any information on the slope of land areas.

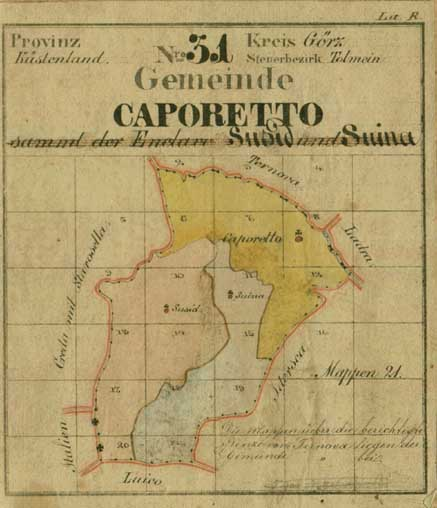
Sketch on the original map of the Franciscan cadastre. Municipality of Caporetto (Kobarid, Karfreit) in the Isonzo Valley

Investigations in open terrain suggested an average error of 80 cm, and even more in unfavourable terrain. The average line thickness of 0.15 mm alone results in a maximum accuracy of around 40 cm at the usual scale of 1:2880. Despite careful storage, changes (shrinkage, warping) in the (handmade) paper of the cadastral sheets are to be expected. The representation in the cadastre may therefore show deviations in the range of metres for length specifications and up to 20 per cent for area specifications. (Note: Resolution 76/E XXIII. GP: Reference to the non-binding nature of area specifications in electronic land register extracts, adopted at the meeting of the Austrian National Council on June 5, 2008, in the XXIII. legislative period on the basis of motion 362/UEA XXIII. GP.)

To obtain reliable information about the cadastre's status at a specific point in time, it may be necessary to consult the original map, any subsequent (rectified) versions, the working records of the surveying officials, and the copies held in the relevant provincial archives. If the boundaries and areas of a property have not been re-measured using modern methods since its registration in the Franziszeischer Kataster, information from the early 19th century may still be found in the land registers and land register extracts of the 21st century. In today's Austria, half of all properties have reportedly never been re-measured since their registration in the cadastre.

== See also ==
- List of maps
- Franzisco-Josephinian survey
- Franziszeische Landesaufnahme
- Valid
- Josephinian survey
- Legal cadastre

== Original sources and access to the Franziszeischen Cadastre ==
The original map for the territories of Austria is kept in the cadastral map archive at the Federal Office of Metrology and Surveying. The other sheets were handed over to the successor states. The originals of the Franziszeische Landesaufnahme, 2,628 map sheets and derived maps, are available at the Austrian State Archives/War Archives.

Digitised versions online:

- Cadastral surveying instructions
- Cadastral Records Act 1883

Regional:

- Cadastral maps from the duplicate folder for the province of Upper Austria (map layer at DORIS intermap)
- Cadastral maps from the original folder for the province of Vorarlberg, as of 1857 (map layer at VOGIS)
- Cadastral maps for Bohemia, Moravia and Austrian Silesia from the Central Archive for Land Surveying and Cadastre (ZALK)
