= San Xavier, Arizona =

- Populated place
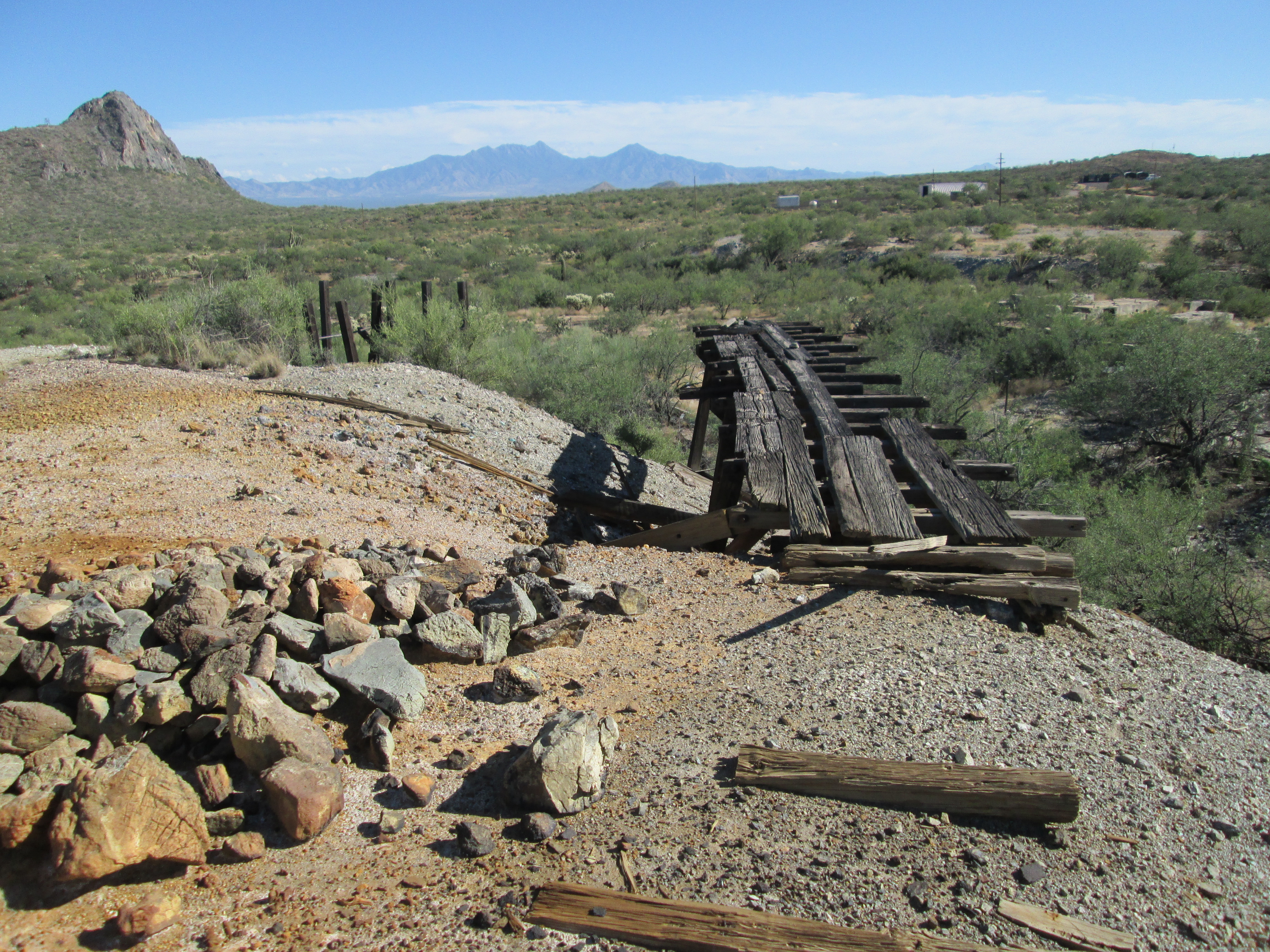
- Mine dump and ruins of rail haulage at San Xavier. Helmet Peak is at the left and the Santa Rita Mountains are in the background.

- Location within Arizona
- Coordinates: 31°58′19.05″N 111°05′40.00″W
- Country: United States
- State: Arizona
- County: Pima
- Elevation: 3,540 ft (1,080 m)
- Time zone: Mountain (MST)
- Area code: 520
- Post Office opened: March 4, 1887
- Post Office closed: May 23, 1892

San Xavier is a populated place in Pima County, Arizona, United States, situated seventeen miles southwest of Tucson, and six miles northwest of Sahuarita. Originally a small silver mining camp from the 1880s, today San Xavier is little more than a collection of rural homes and partially abandoned mines. The ghost towns of Azurite and Mineral Hill were located about one mile north of San Xavier. Twin Buttes was five miles southeast.

== History ==
The San Xavier Mining & Smelting Company was established in 1880 by Colonel C. P. Skyes, who named his company after the San Xavier Mission, ten miles northeast. Soon after, the town of San Xavier was formed in between Helmet Peak and White Hill. Several mines and associated camps were located in the immediate area, including Azurite, Mineral Hill, Wedge, and the Michigan Maid, though there were no smelters, and ore had to be shipped elsewhere. Miners were paid with checks.

In the early 1880s, the Olivette Mine was established just southwest of San Xavier. As a result, the town was renamed Olive, in honor of Mrs. Olive Stephenson Brown, who was the wife of one of the mine's owners, James Kilroy Brown. The Brown family also owned the nearby Sahuarita Ranch, which eventually became the town Sahuarita. James E. Sherman, in his book Ghost Towns of Arizona, says that Mrs. Brown treated the local miners to a free chicken dinner every Sunday until the late 1880s, when the Olivette Mine was sold and the Brown family moved to Tucson.

After the Brown family moved away, silver prices fell and mining in the Pima District switched to copper, leading to the decline of the town. The Olive Post Office was briefly open from March 4, 1887, to May 23, 1892, although operations at the nearby San Xavier Mine continued until 1918. Since then, the area has been known as San Xavier. In 1943, the Eagle-Picher Mining Company purchased the San Xavier Mine and placed it back into production. However, operations were curtailed in 1952 due to low metal prices.

A few residents remain in San Xavier, and since 1958 the University of Arizona has maintained an underground mining laboratory inside one of the old mine shafts. The large, modern Pima-Mission Mine is located immediately east of San Xavier. The ruins are not open to the general public because of the dangerous mine shafts throughout the area.

== Gallery ==
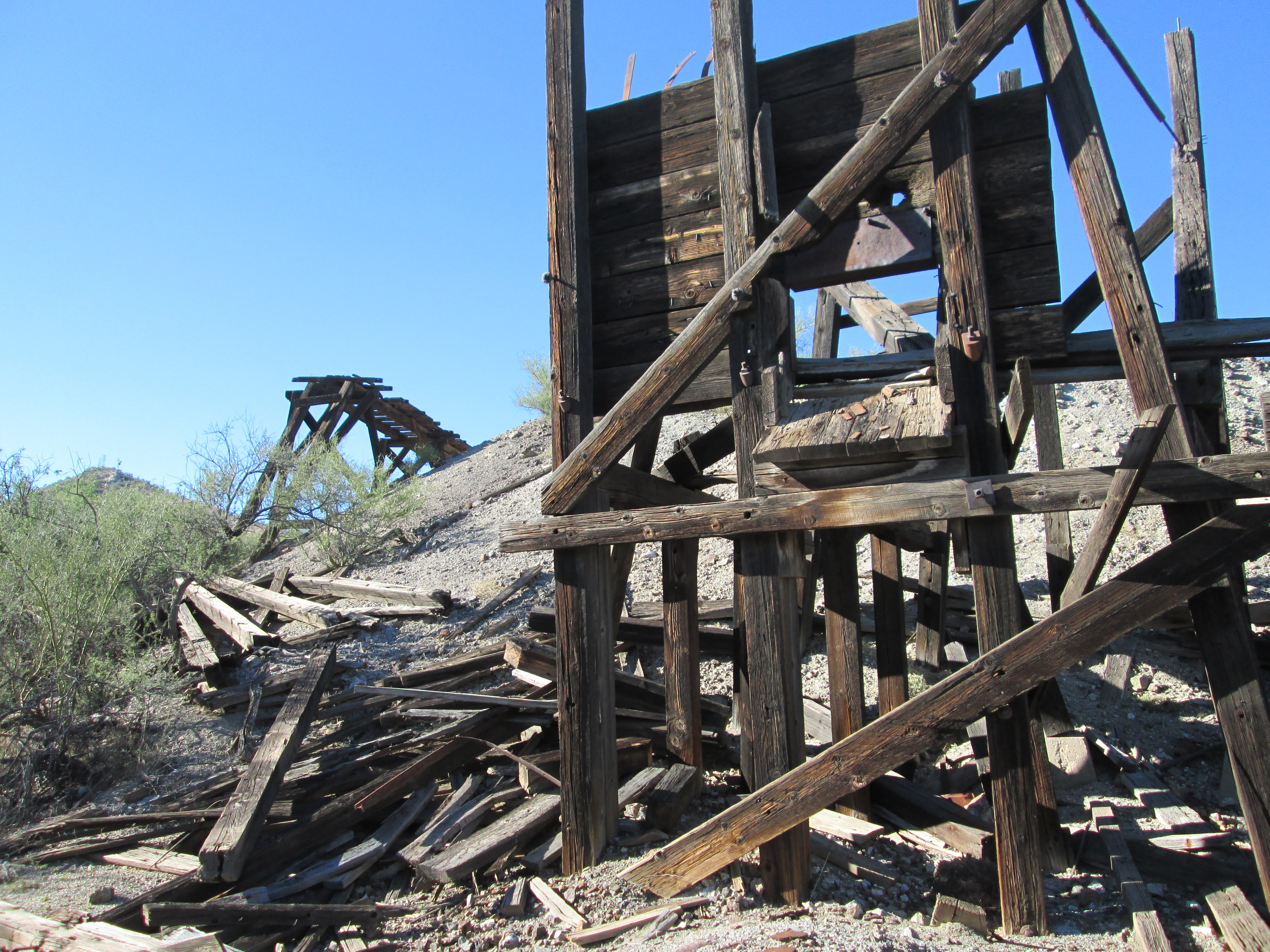
Ruins of timber structures

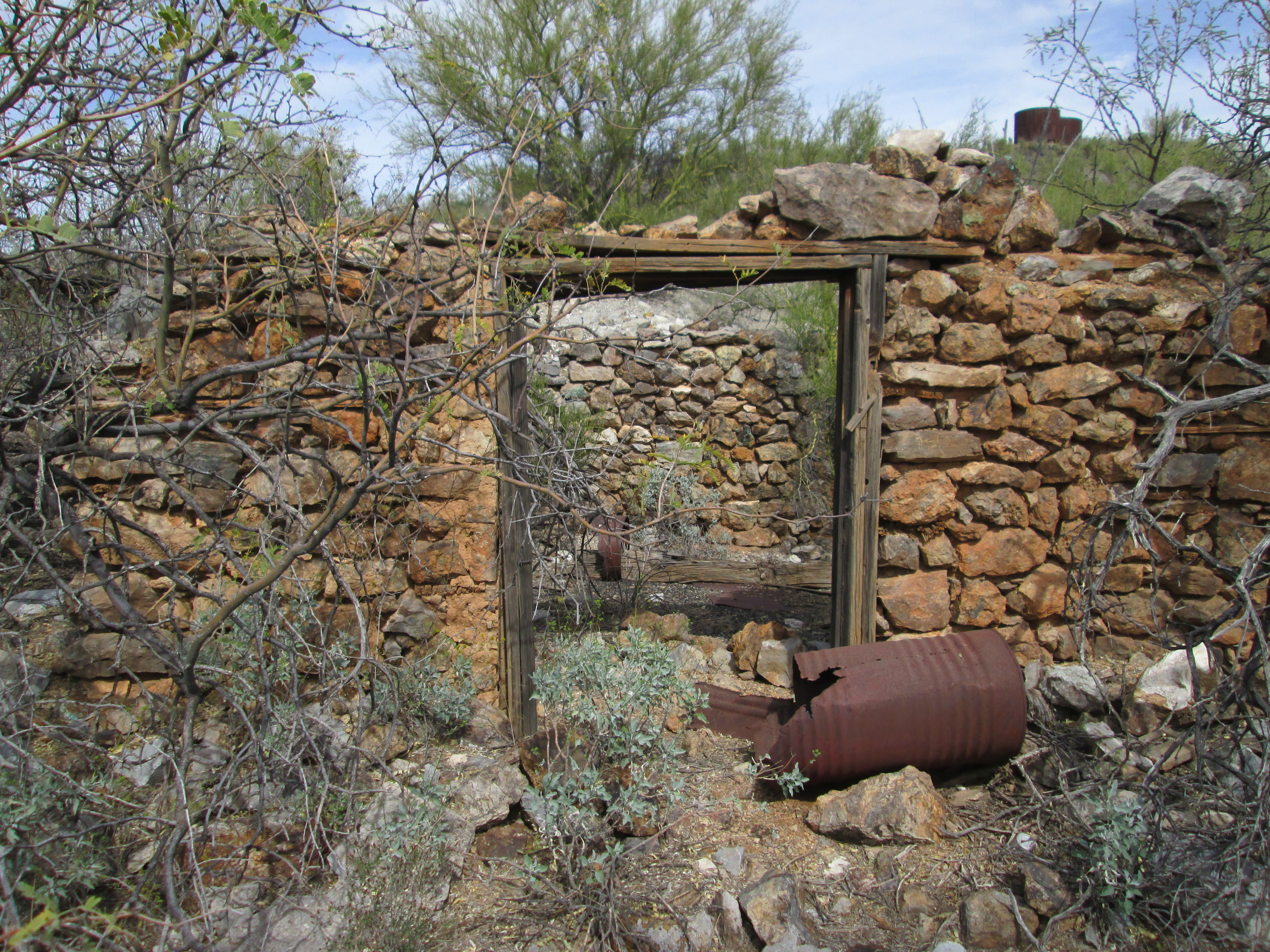
The ruins of a stone building in San Xavier.

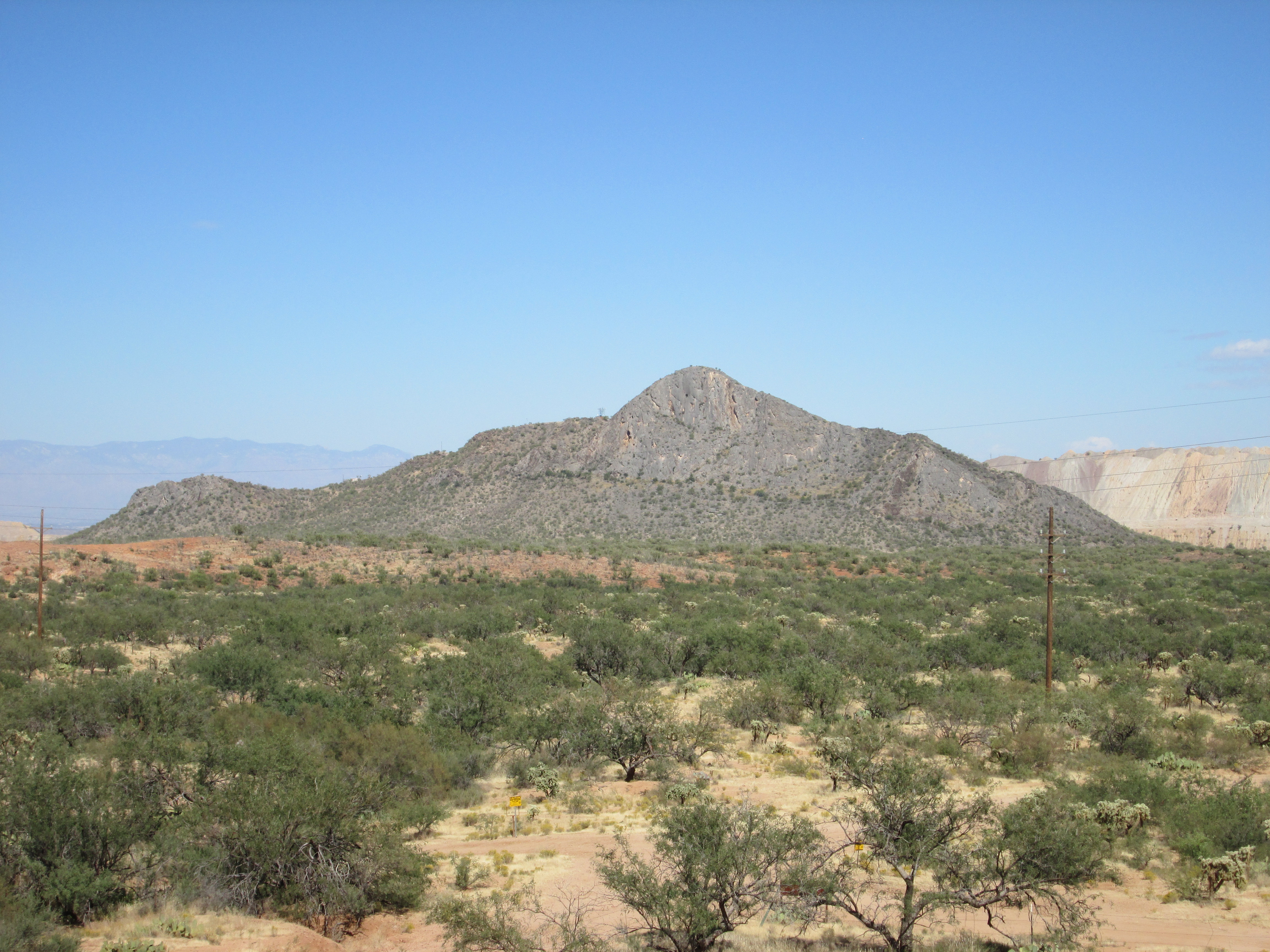
Helmet Peak

== See also ==
- List of ghost towns in Arizona
- Copper mining in Arizona
- San Xavier Indian Reservation
