= Totacon, Arizona =

- Populated place
- Location within the state of Arizona Totacon (the United States)
- Coordinates: 36°51′00″N 109°25′32″W
- Country: United States
- State: Arizona
- County: Apache
- Elevation: 5,350 ft (1,630 m)
- Time zone: UTC-7 (Mountain (MST))
  - Summer (DST): UTC-7 (MST)
- Area code: 928
- FIPS code: 04-74995
- GNIS feature ID: 24658

Totacon, also known as Sweetwater, Tolacon, and Totlacon, is a populated place situated in northern Apache County, Arizona, United States. It has an estimated elevation of 5,348 feet (1,630 m) above sea level.
