= Land information system =

A Land Information System (LIS) is a geographic information system for cadastral and land-use mapping, typically used by local governments.

A LIS consists of an accurate, current and reliable land record cadastre and its associated attribute and spatial data that represent the legal boundaries of land tenure and provides a vital base layer capable of integration into other geographic systems or as a standalone solution that allows data stewards to retrieve, create, update, store, view, analyze and publish land information.

== Importance ==
1. Land parcel is the basic unit for access and control of land, land use decisions.
2. Current, reliable land information necessary for many public programs: land planning, infrastructure development and maintenance, environmental protection and resource management, emergency services, social service programs and so forth.
3. LIS provides a base for land markets, development, and other economic activity.
4. LIS helps in updating of the maps.
5. Improves data accuracy and eliminates redundant data entry
6. Streamlines and simplifies the land and lease management process
