= Tatk Kam Vo, Arizona =

- Populated place
- Location within the state of Arizona Tatk Kam Vo (the United States)
- Coordinates: 31°59′24″N 112°20′37″W
- Country: United States
- State: Arizona
- County: Pima
- Elevation: 3,600 ft (1,100 m)
- Time zone: UTC-7 (Mountain (MST))
  - Summer (DST): UTC-7 (MST)
- Area code: 520
- FIPS code: 04-72195
- GNIS feature ID: 24645

Tatk Kam Vo is a populated place situated in Pima County, Arizona, United States. It is a small village situated approximately 3.5 miles southwest of Pisinemo, located on the San Xavier Indian Reservation. Historically, it has also been known as Iramit and Nestors. The name is derived from the O'odham phrase meaning "root place charco". Tatk Kam Vo was designated as the official name as a result of a decision by the Board on Geographic Names in 1941. In their recommendation to the BGN in 1939, the Office of Indian Affairs recommended the name be kept as three words, since combining them gave a different meaning. It has an estimated elevation of 1,795 feet (547 m) above sea level.
