= Tsintaa Yiti Ii, Arizona =

- Populated place
- Location within the state of Arizona Tsintaa Yiti Ii (the United States)
- Coordinates: 35°49′32″N 109°48′44″W
- Country: United States
- State: Arizona
- County: Apache
- Elevation: 6,348 ft (1,935 m)
- Time zone: UTC-7 (Mountain (MST))
  - Summer (DST): UTC-7 (MST)
- Area code: 928
- FIPS code: 04-75905
- GNIS feature ID: 12792

Tsintaa Yiti Ii is a populated place situated in Apache County, Arizona, United States. It has an estimated elevation of 6,348 feet (1,935 m) above sea level.
