= Totopitk, Arizona =

- Populated place
- Location within the state of Arizona Totopitk (the United States)
- Coordinates: 32°33′48″N 112°12′47″W
- Country: United States
- State: Arizona
- County: Maricopa
- Elevation: 2,064 ft (629 m)
- Time zone: UTC-7 (Mountain (MST))
  - Summer (DST): UTC-7 (MST)
- Area code: 520
- FIPS code: 04-75030
- GNIS feature ID: 24659

Totopitk is a populated place situated in Maricopa County, Arizona, United States. Totopitk is an O'odham word meaning "crooked" or "lopsided". Historically, it has been known by a plethora of names, including Tauabit, Tautabit, Toapit, Totabit, Toto-Bitk, Totobit, Totobit Tanks, and Totobitk. The name Totopitk became official as a result of a decision of the Board on Geographic Names in 1941. It has an estimated elevation of 2,064 feet (629 m) above sea level.
