= Tahchee, Arizona =

- Populated place
- Location within the state of Arizona Tahchee (the United States)
- Coordinates: 36°13′43″N 109°53′40″W
- Country: United States
- State: Arizona
- County: Apache
- Elevation: 6,654 ft (2,028 m)
- Time zone: UTC-7 (Mountain (MST))
  - Summer (DST): UTC-7 (MST)
- Area code: 928
- FIPS code: 04-71860
- GNIS feature ID: 25272

Tahchee is a populated place situated in Apache County, Arizona, United States. It has an estimated elevation of 6,653 feet (2,028 m) above sea level.
