= Trench Camp, Arizona =

Populated place in Santa Cruz County, Arizona

- Populated place
- Location within the state of Arizona Trench Camp (the United States)
- Coordinates: 31°27′52″N 110°43′45″W
- Country: United States
- State: Arizona
- County: Santa Cruz
- Elevation: 5,223 ft (1,592 m)
- Time zone: UTC-7 (Mountain (MST))
  - Summer (DST): UTC-7 (MST)
- Area code: 520
- FIPS code: 04-75475
- GNIS feature ID: 35457

Trench Camp is a populated place situated in Santa Cruz County, Arizona, United States. It has an estimated elevation of 5,223 feet (1,592 m) above sea level.
