= Twin Buttes, Navajo County, Arizona =

Twin Buttes, Arizona
- Populated place
- Location within the state of Arizona Twin Buttes (the United States)
- Coordinates: 35°26′07″N 109°54′14″W
- Country: United States
- State: Arizona
- County: Navajo
- Elevation: 5,794 ft (1,766 m)
- Time zone: UTC-7 (Mountain (MST))
  - Summer (DST): UTC-7 (MST)
- Area code: 928
- FIPS code: 04-77735
- GNIS feature ID: 25326

Twin Buttes is a populated place situated in Navajo County, Arizona, United States. It is one of two populated locations in Arizona with this name, the other being in Pima County.
