= Tatkum Vo, Arizona =

- Populated place
- Location within the state of Arizona Tatkum Vo (the United States)
- Coordinates: 31°40′05″N 112°07′25″W
- Country: United States
- State: Arizona
- County: Pima
- Elevation: 2,287 ft (697 m)
- Time zone: UTC-7 (Mountain (MST))
  - Summer (DST): UTC-7 (MST)
- Area code: 520
- FIPS code: 04-72240
- GNIS feature ID: 24646

Tatkum Vo is a populated place situated in Pima County, Arizona, United States, adjacent to the international border with Mexico. It is a small village located on the San Xavier Indian Reservation. The name is an O'odham term meaning "snorer's chaco". Historically, it was also erroneously called Serape. The name was made official by a decision of the Board on Geographic Names on April 29, 1941. It has an estimated elevation of 2,287 feet (697 m) above sea level.
