= Tanner Springs, Arizona =

Populated place in Apache County, Arizona

- Populated place
- Location within the state of Arizona Tanner Springs (the United States)
- Coordinates: 35°17′18″N 109°41′08″W
- Country: United States
- State: Arizona
- County: Apache
- Elevation: 5,787 ft (1,764 m)
- Time zone: UTC-7 (Mountain (MST))
  - Summer (DST): UTC-7 (MST)
- Area code: 928
- FIPS code: 04-71910
- GNIS feature ID: 24640

Tanner Springs, historically also known as La Xara Springs and Ojo La Xara, is a populated place situated in Apache County, Arizona, United States. It has an estimated elevation of 5,787 feet (1,764 m) above sea level.
