= Tolchico, Arizona =

- Populated place
- Location within the state of Arizona Tolchico (the United States)
- Coordinates: 35°23′36″N 111°06′29″W
- Country: United States
- State: Arizona
- County: Coconino
- Elevation: 4,669 ft (1,423 m)
- Time zone: UTC-7 (Mountain (MST))
  - Summer (DST): UTC-7 (MST)
- Area code: 928
- FIPS code: 04-74155
- GNIS feature ID: 24656

Tolchico, also known as Tolchaco or Tolchiko, is a populated place situated in Coconino County, Arizona, United States. Tolchico is derived from tolchiko, which is the Navajo term for the Colorado River. It has an estimated elevation of 4,669 feet (1,423 m) above sea level.

In the 1880s Hermann Woolf kept a trading post here, termed Tolchico, Navajo for "river ford". Consequently, the ford here is referred to as Wolf Crossing.
