= Tatai Toak, Arizona =

- Populated place
- Location within the state of Arizona Tatai Toak (the United States)
- Coordinates: 32°23′47″N 112°29′48″W
- Country: United States
- State: Arizona
- County: Pima
- Elevation: 2,241 ft (683 m)
- Time zone: UTC-7 (Mountain (MST))
  - Summer (DST): UTC-7 (MST)
- Area code: 520
- FIPS code: 04-72155
- GNIS feature ID: 24647

Tatai Toak is a populated place situated in Pima County, Arizona, United States. The small village is located on the San Xavier Indian Reservation, and its name is derived from the O'odham for "roadrunner mountain". Historically, it has also been known as Road Runner Village, Perigua, and Tatria Toak. The name officially became Tatia Toak by a decision of the Board on Geographic Names in 1964. It has an estimated elevation of 2,241 feet (683 m) above sea level.
