= Twin Buttes, Pima County, Arizona =

Town

Twin Buttes
- Populated place
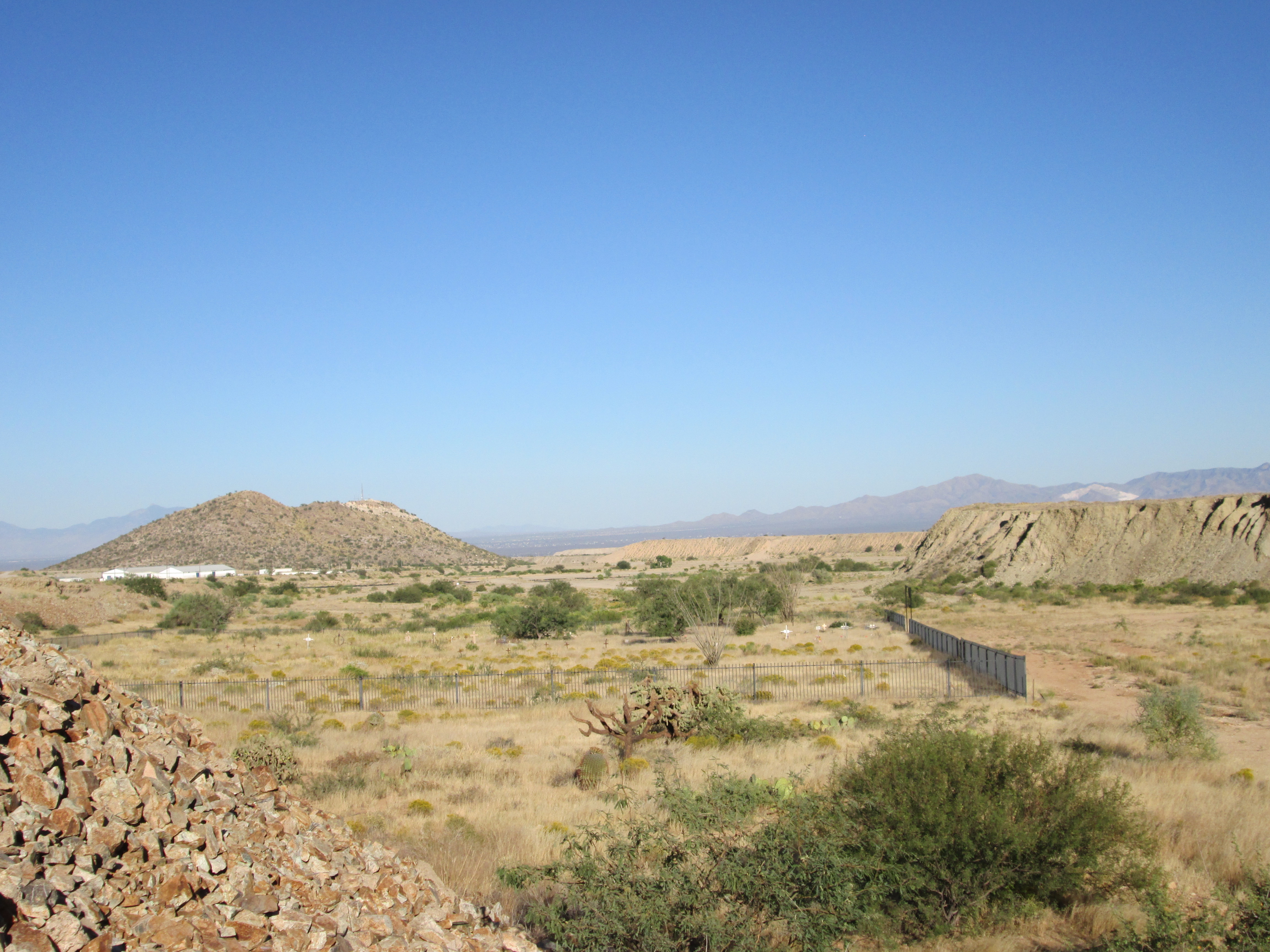
- The Twin Buttes Cemetery and surrounding area. The Twin Buttes formation is at the left.
- Interactive map of Twin Buttes
- Coordinates: 31°54′09″N 111°03′38″W
- Country: United States
- State: Arizona
- County: Pima

Population
  - Total: ~300
- Time zone: MST (no DST)
- Post Office opened: December 29, 1906
- Post Office closed: August 15, 1930

Twin Buttes is a populated place on the east flank of the Sierrita Mountains approximately twenty miles south of Tucson, in Pima County, Arizona, United States. Named after a prominent hill located next to the town, Twin Buttes was founded as a small mining town circa 1903 and abandoned around 1930. Much of the actual town site is now buried underneath mine tailings, and all that remains is the Twin Buttes Cemetery.

== History ==
The discovery of copper in the Twin Buttes area is credited to three prospectors known as "The Three Nations" – John G. Baxter, who was from Wisconsin, an Irishman named Michael Irish, and John Ellis of Scotland. After struggling for years to develop a few small prospects, they convinced Mayor David Stuart Rose of Wisconsin and a number of other investors to take over the property, resulting in the establishment of the Twin Buttes Mining & Smelting Company in 1903.

The Twin Buttes Mining & Smelting Company operated several mines in the immediate area, including the Senator Morgan Mine, the Copper Glance Mine, and the Copper Queen and Copper King Mines. The company shipped their ore to the smelter at Sasco and elsewhere until 1914. The town of Twin Buttes had a population of about 300 at its height, and consisted of a bunkhouse, an assay office, a company store, a butcher shop, a boarding house, and a school (run by School District No. 21, Pima County), in addition to houses and tents.

1906 was an important year for the people of Twin Buttes. That year work was completed on the Twin Buttes Railroad, which connected the town with the Southern Pacific's Tucson–Nogales line at nearby Sahuarita. The Twin Buttes Railroad Station was officially opened on July 4, 1906, and the Twin Buttes Post Office was opened on December 29.

According to James E. Sherman, author of Ghost Towns of Arizona, Twin Buttes became a ghost town after "a series of ups and downs." The railroad operated from 1906 until the late 1920s, when mining in the Pima District declined. The post office was closed on August 15, 1930.

Although the town died, operations at the Twin Buttes Mine continued for the next several decades until 1994, when the mine was closed. In 2009 Freeport McMoRan acquired the property and has since recommenced mining operations.

== Gallery ==
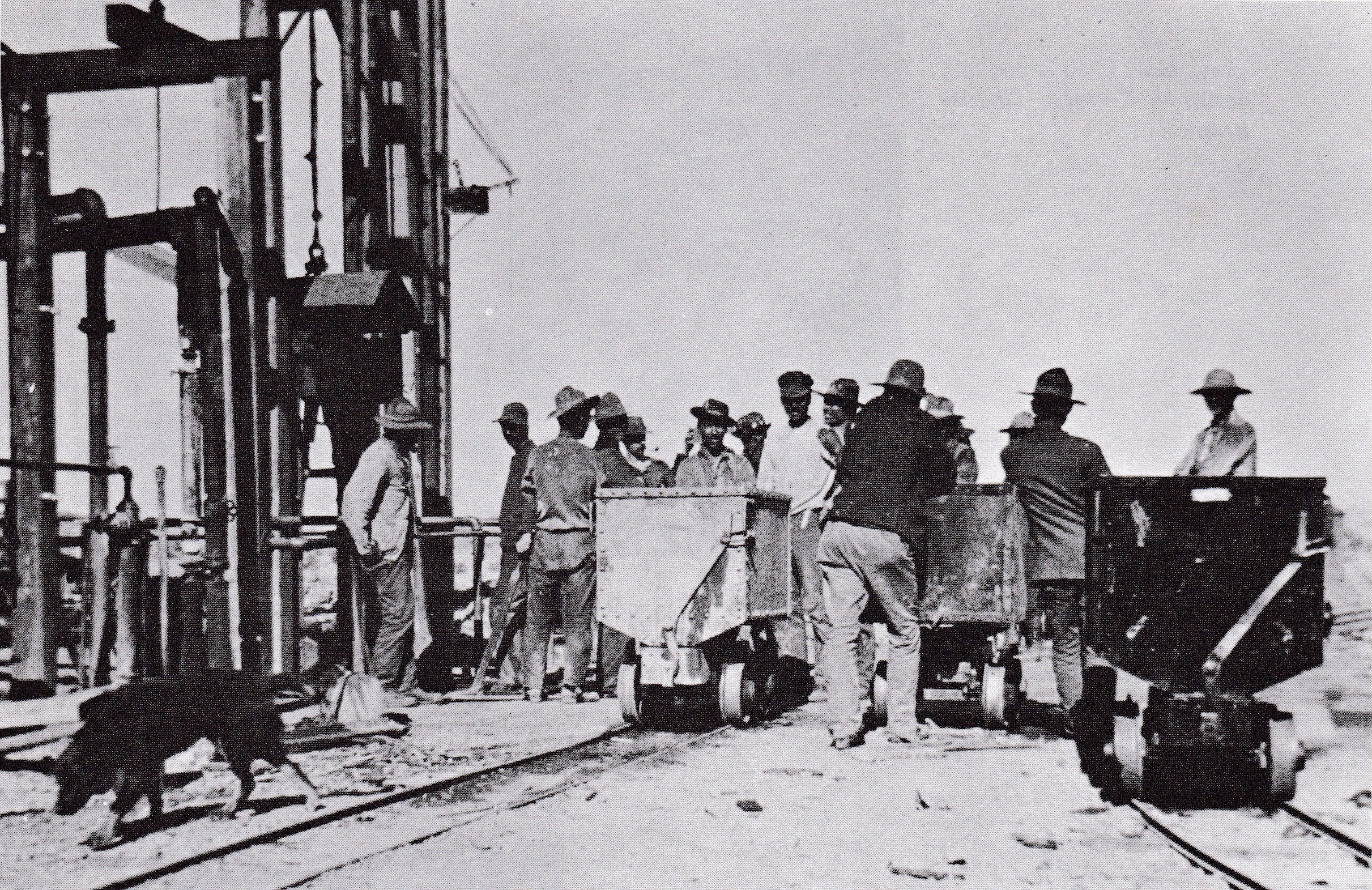
Miners at the Twin Buttes Mine waiting to be transferred underground, c.1905.

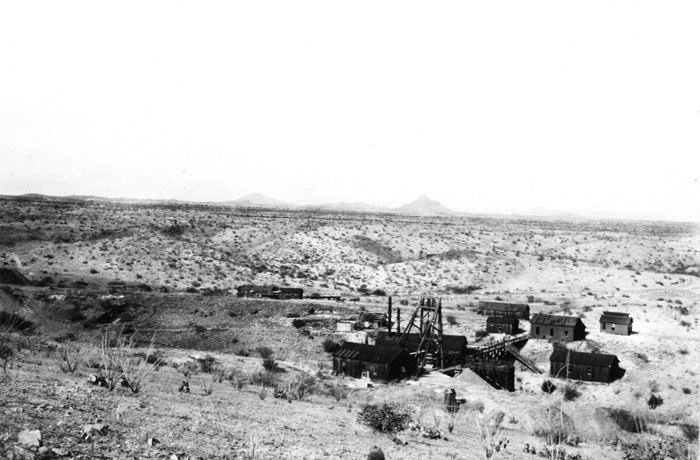
The Senator Morgan Mine in 1920. White Hill and Helmet Peak can be seen in the background.

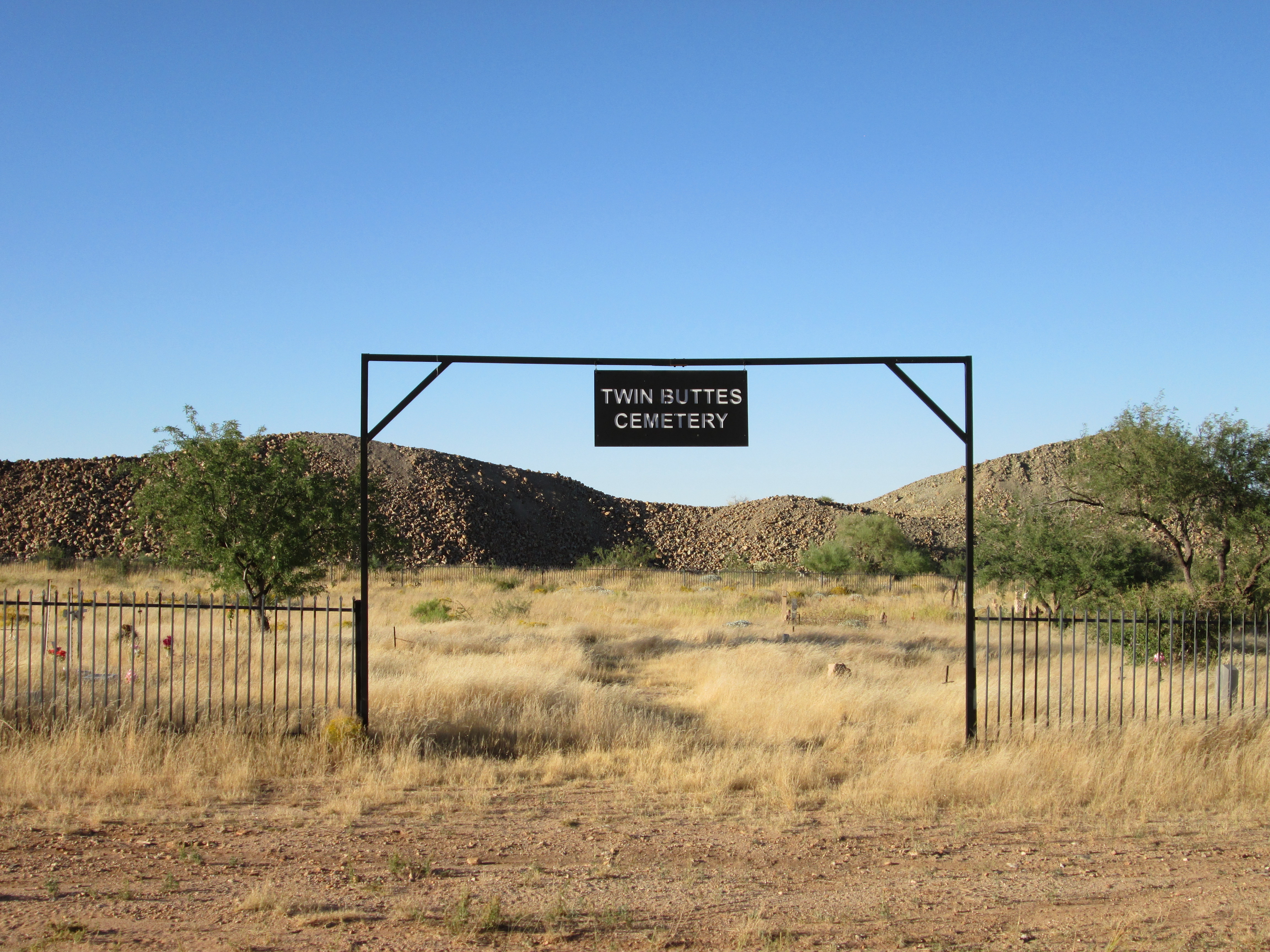
The entrance to the Twin Buttes Cemetery.

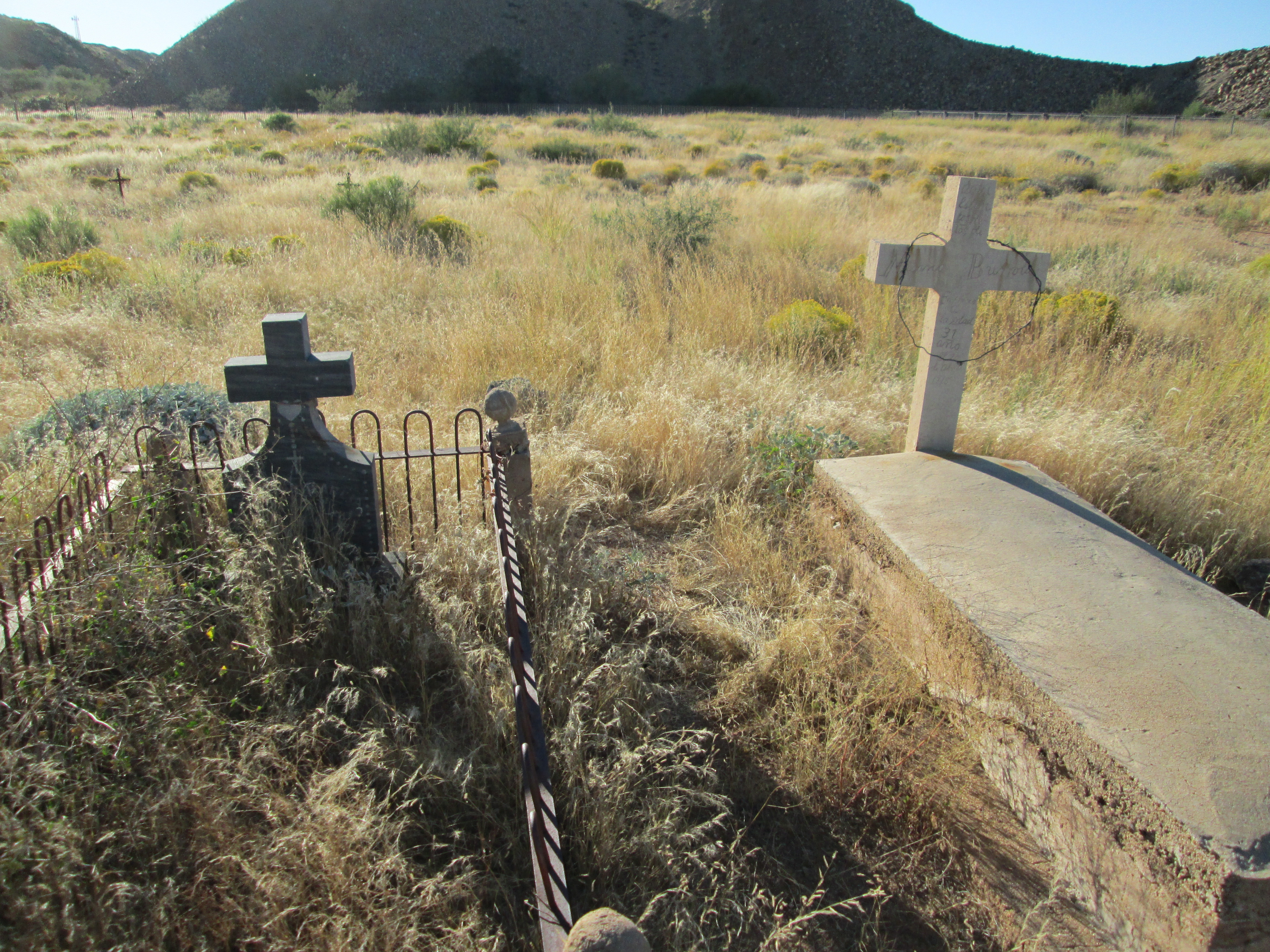
Old graves at the Twin Buttes Cemetery.

== See also ==
- San Xavier, Arizona
- List of ghost towns in Arizona
- Copper mining in Arizona
