= Arizona =

U.S. state

- State
- Flag Seal
- Nicknames: The Grand Canyon State; The Copper State; The Valentine State
- Motto: Ditat Deus ('God enriches')
- Anthem: "The Arizona March Song"
- Location of Arizona within the United States
- Country: United States
- Before statehood: Arizona Territory
- Admitted to the Union: February 14, 1912; 114 years ago (48th)
- Capital (and largest city): Phoenix
- Largest county or equivalent: Maricopa
- Largest metro and urban areas: Phoenix

Government
  - Governor: Katie Hobbs (D)
  - Secretary of State: Adrian Fontes (D) (Note: If the governor dies, resigns or is (via impeachment conviction) removed from office, the secretary of state is first in line to become governor.)
- Legislature: Arizona State Legislature
  - Upper house: Senate
  - Lower house: House of Representatives
- Judiciary: Arizona Supreme Court
- U.S. senators: Mark Kelly (D); Ruben Gallego (D)
- U.S. House delegation: 6 Republicans; 3 Democrats (list)

Area
  - Total: 113,998 sq mi (295,254 km^{2})
  - Rank: 6th

Dimensions
  - Length: 401 mi (645 km)
  - Width: 310 mi (500 km)
- Elevation: 4,100 ft (1,250 m)
- Highest elevation (Humphreys Peak (Note: Elevation adjusted to North American Vertical Datum of 1988)): 12,638 ft (3,852 m)
- Lowest elevation (Colorado River at the Mexico border): 72 ft (22 m)

Population (2025)
  - Total: ▲7,623,818
  - Rank: 14th
  - Density: 62/sq mi (24/km^{2})
  - Rank: 32nd
  - Median household income: ▼$77,300 (2023)
  - Income rank: 20th
- Demonym: Arizonan

Language
  - Official language: English
  - Spoken language: As of 2010: English 74.1%; Spanish 19.5%; Navajo 1.9%; Other 4.5%

Time zones
- Most of the state: UTC−07:00 (MST)
- Navajo Nation: UTC−07:00 (MST)
  - Summer (DST): UTC−06:00 (MDT)
- USPS abbreviation: AZ
- ISO 3166 code: US-AZ
- Traditional abbreviation: Ariz.
- Latitude: 31°20′ N to 37° N
- Longitude: 109°03′ W to 114°49′ W
- Website: az.gov

Arizona (Note: /ˌærɪˈzoʊnə/ ARR-iz-OH-nə; Navajo: Hoozdo Hahoodzo [hoː˥z̥to˩ ha˩hoː˩tso˩]; O'odham: Alĭ ṣonak [ˈaɭi̥ ˈʂɔnak]) is a landlocked state in the Southwestern United States, sharing the Four Corners region with Colorado, New Mexico, and Utah. It also borders Nevada to the northwest and California to the west, and shares an international border with the Mexican states of Sonora and Baja California to the south and southwest. Its capital and largest city is Phoenix, which is the most populous state capital and fifth-most populous city in the United States. Arizona is divided into 15 counties.

Arizona is the sixth-largest state by area and the 14th-most-populous of the 50 states. It is the 48th state and last of the contiguous states to be admitted to the Union, achieving statehood on February 14, 1912. Historically part of the territory of Alta California and Nuevo México in New Spain (Spanish Empire), it became part of independent Mexico in 1821. After being defeated in the Mexican–American War, Mexico ceded much of this territory to the United States in 1848, where the area became part of the New Mexico Territory. The southernmost portion of the state was acquired in 1853 through the Gadsden Purchase.

Southern Arizona is known for its desert climate, with extremely hot summers and mild winters. Northern Arizona features forests of pine, Douglas fir, and spruce trees; the Colorado Plateau; mountain ranges (such as the San Francisco Mountains); as well as large, deep canyons, with much more moderate summer temperatures and significant winter snowfalls. There are ski resorts in the areas of Flagstaff, Sunrise, and Tucson. In addition to the internationally known Grand Canyon National Park, which is one of the world's seven natural wonders, there are several national forests, national parks, and national monuments.

Arizona is home to a diverse population. About one-quarter of the state is made up of Indian reservations that serve as the home of 27 federally recognized Native American tribes, including the Navajo Nation, the largest in the state and the country, with more than 300,000 citizens. Since the 1980s, the proportion of Hispanics has grown significantly owing to migration from Mexico and Central America. A substantial portion of the population are followers of the Roman Catholic Church and the Church of Jesus Christ of Latter-day Saints. Arizona's population and economy have grown dramatically since the 1950s because of inward migration, and the state is now a major hub of the Sun Belt. Many large companies, such as PetSmart and Circle K, have headquarters in the state, and Arizona is home to major universities, including the University of Arizona, Arizona State University, and Northern Arizona University.

== Etymology ==
The state's name appears to originate from an earlier Spanish name, Arizonac, derived from the O'odham name alĭ ṣonak, meaning 'small spring'. Initially this term was applied by Spanish colonists only to an area near the silver mining camp of Planchas de Plata, Sonora. To the European settlers, the O'odham pronunciation sounded like Arissona. The area is still known as alĭ ṣonak in the O'odham language.

Another possible origin is the Basque phrase haritz ona 'the good oak', as there were numerous Basque shepherds in the area. A native-born Mexican of Basque ancestry established the ranchería (small rural settlement) of Arizona between 1734 and 1736 in the current Mexican state of Sonora. It became notable after a significant discovery of silver there around 1737.

== History ==
For thousands of years before the modern era, Arizona was home to many ancient Native American civilizations. Hohokam, Mogollon, and Ancestral Puebloan cultures were among those that flourished throughout the state. Many of their pueblos, cliffside dwellings, rock paintings and other prehistoric treasures have survived and attract thousands of tourists each year.

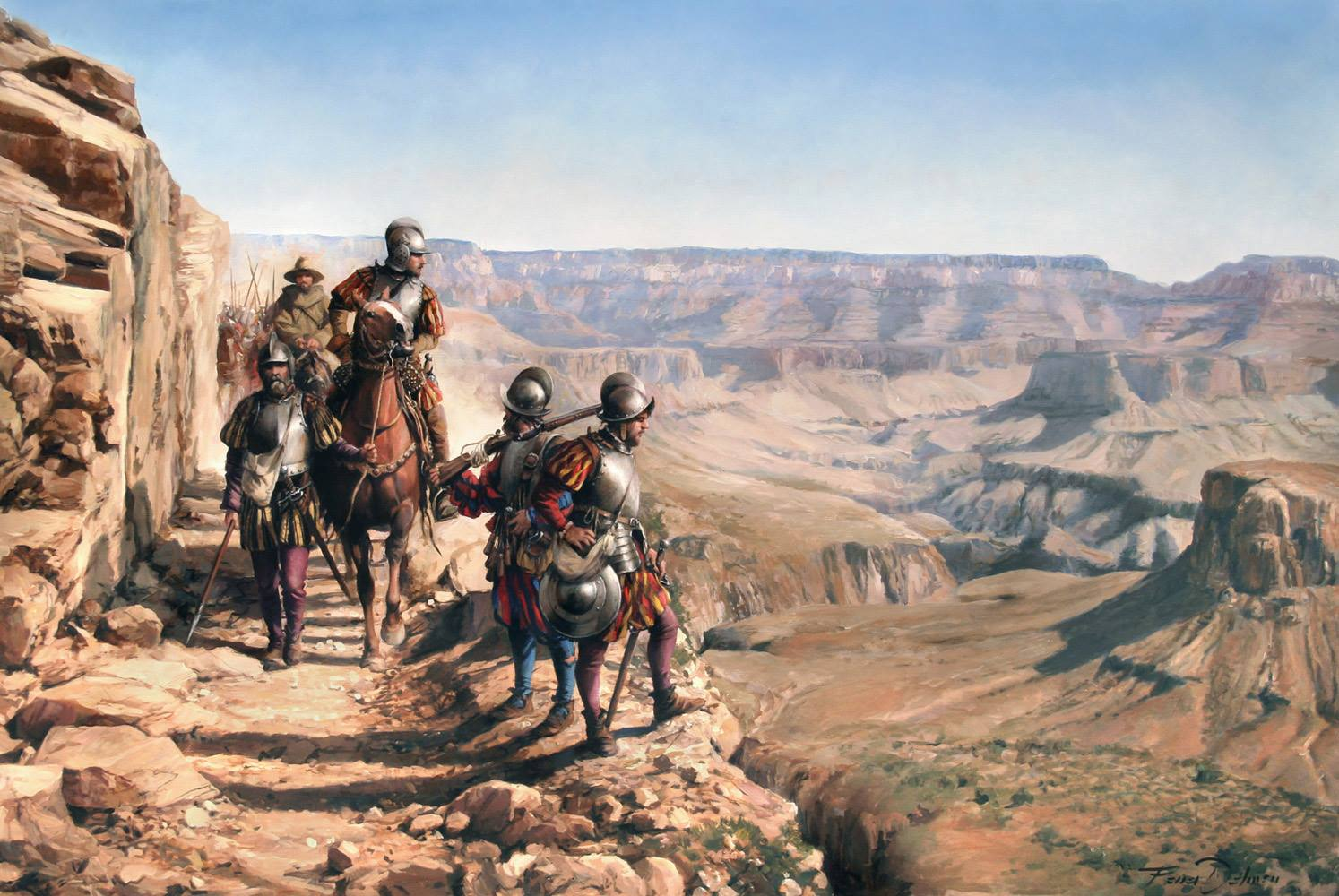
La conquista del Colorado, by Augusto Ferrer-Dalmau, depicts Francisco Vázquez de Coronado's 1540–1542 expedition. García López de Cárdenas can be seen overlooking the Grand Canyon.

In 1539, Marcos de Niza, a Spanish Franciscan, became the first European to contact Native Americans. He explored parts of the present state and made contact with native inhabitants, probably the Sobaipuri. The expedition of Spanish explorer Coronado entered the area in 1540–1542 during its search for Cíbola. One of the first settlers in Arizona was José Romo de Vivar.

Father Kino was the next European in the region under Spanish rule. A member of the Society of Jesus ("Jesuits"), he led the development of a chain of missions in the region. He converted many of the Indians to Christianity in the Pimería Alta (now southern Arizona and northern Sonora) in the 1690s and early 18th century. Spain founded presidios ("fortified towns") at Tubac in 1752 and Tucson in 1775.

When Mexico achieved its independence from the Kingdom of Spain and its Spanish Empire in 1821, what is now Arizona became part of its Territory of Nueva California, ("New California"), also known as Alta California ("Upper California"). Descendants of ethnic Spanish and mestizo settlers from the colonial years still lived in the area at the time of the arrival of later European-American migrants from the United States.

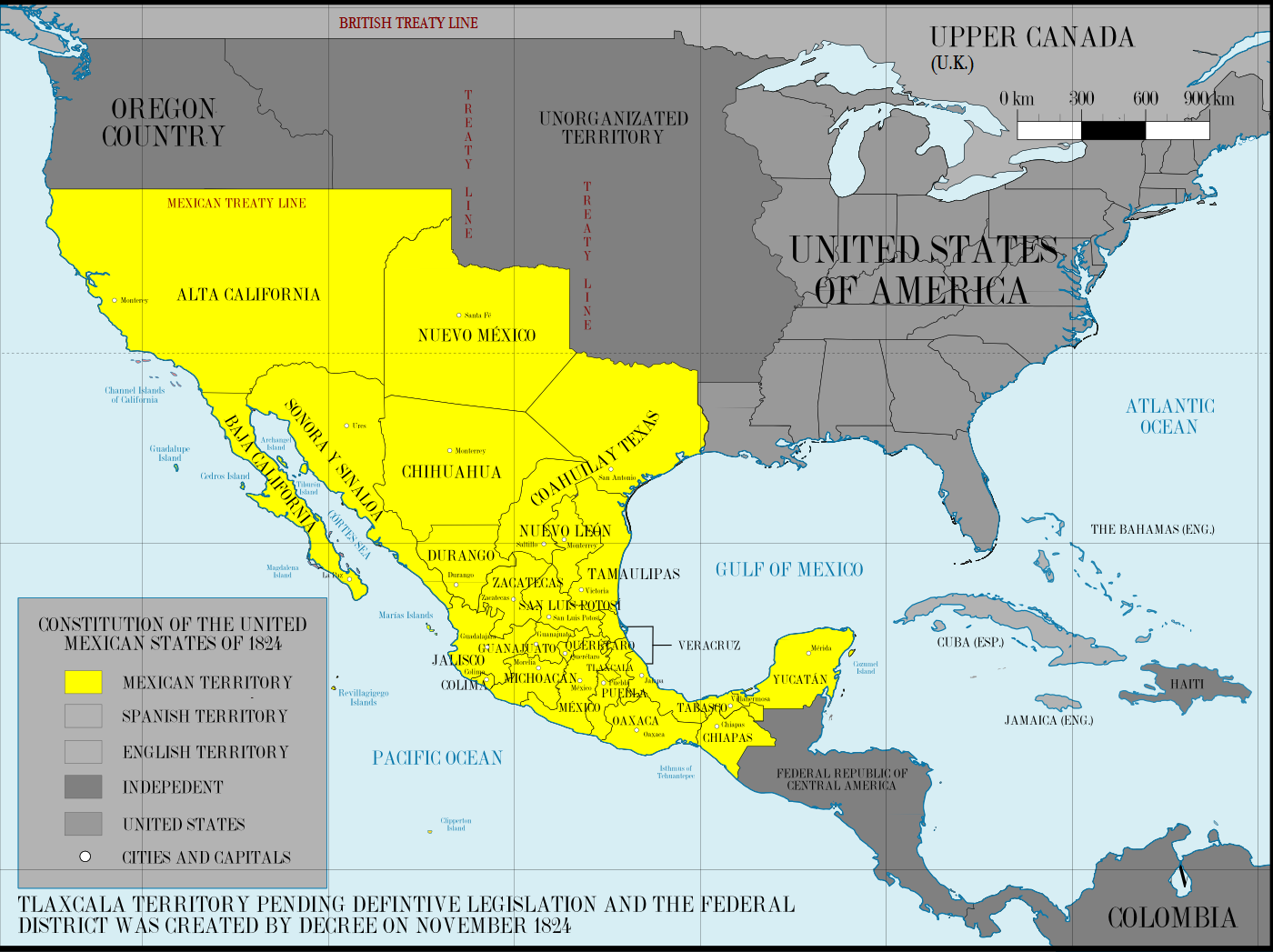
Mexico in 1824. Alta California is the northwesternmost state.

During the Mexican–American War (1847–1848), the U.S. Army occupied the national capital of Mexico City and pursued its claim to much of northern Mexico, including what later became Arizona Territory in 1863 and later the State of Arizona in 1912. The Treaty of Guadalupe Hidalgo (1848) specified that, in addition to language and cultural rights of the existing inhabitants of former Mexican citizens being considered as inviolable, the sum of $15 million in compensation (equivalent to $558,173,076.92 in 2025) be paid to the Republic of Mexico. In 1853, the U.S. acquired the land south below the Gila River from Mexico in the Gadsden Purchase along the southern border area as encompassing the best future southern route for a transcontinental railway.

What is now the state of Arizona was administered by the United States government as part of the Territory of New Mexico from 1850 until the southern part of that region seceded from the Union to form the Territory of Arizona. This newly established territory was formally organized by the federal government of the Confederate States on Saturday, January 18, 1862, when President Jefferson Davis approved and signed An Act to Organize the Territory of Arizona, marking the first official use of the name "Territory of Arizona". The Southern territory supplied the Confederate government with men, horses, and equipment. Formed in 1862, Arizona scout companies served with the Confederate States Army during the American Civil War. Arizona has the westernmost military engagement on record during the Civil War with the Battle of Picacho Pass (1862).

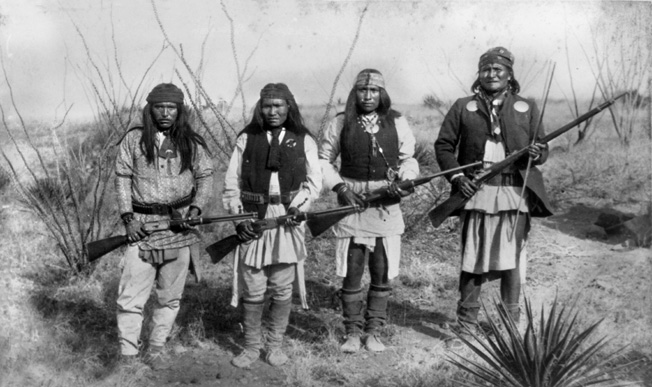
Geronimo (far right) and his Apache warriors fought against both Mexican and American settlers.

The Federal government declared a new U.S. Arizona Territory, consisting of the western half of earlier New Mexico Territory, in Washington, D.C., on February 24, 1863. These new boundaries would later form the basis of the state. The first territorial capital, Prescott, was founded in 1864 following a gold rush to central Arizona. The capital was later moved to Tucson, back to Prescott, and then to its final location in Phoenix in a series of controversial moves as different regions of the territory gained and lost political influence with the growth and development of the territory.

Although names including "Gadsonia", "Pimeria", "Montezuma" and "Arizuma" had been considered for the territory, when 16th President Abraham Lincoln signed the final bill, it read "Arizona", and that name was adopted. (Montezuma was not derived from the Aztec emperor, but was the sacred name of a divine hero to the Akimel O'odham of the Gila River Valley. It was probably considered – and rejected – for its sentimental value before Congress settled on the name "Arizona".)

Brigham Young, leader of the Church of Jesus Christ of Latter-day Saints in Salt Lake City, Utah, sent Mormons to Arizona in the mid- to late 19th century. They founded Mesa, Snowflake, Heber, Safford, and other towns. They also settled in the Phoenix Valley (or "Valley of the Sun"), Tempe, Prescott, and other areas. The Mormons settled what became northern Arizona and northern New Mexico. At the time these areas were in a part of the former New Mexico Territory.

During the nineteenth century, a series of gold and silver rushes occurred in the territory, the best known being the 1870s stampede to the silver bonanzas of Tombstone, Arizona, in southeast Arizona, also known for its legendary outlaws and lawmen. By the late 1880s, copper production eclipsed the precious metals with the rise of copper camps such as Bisbee, Arizona, and Jerome, Arizona. The boom and bust economy of mining also left hundreds of ghost towns across the territory, but copper mining continued to prosper with the territory producing more copper than any other state by 1907, which earned Arizona the nickname "the Copper State" at the time of statehood. During the first years of statehood the industry experienced growing pains and labor disputes with the Bisbee Deportation of 1917, which was the result of a copper miners' strike.

Children of Depression-era migrant workers, Pinal County, 1937

=== 20th century to present ===
During the Mexican Revolution from 1910 to 1920, several battles were fought in the Mexican towns just across the border from Arizona settlements. Throughout the revolution, many Arizonans enlisted in one of the several armies fighting in Mexico. Only two significant engagements took place on U.S. soil between U.S. and Mexican forces: Pancho Villa's 1916 Columbus Raid in New Mexico and the Battle of Ambos Nogales in 1918 in Arizona.

After Mexican federal troops fired on U.S. soldiers, the American garrison launched an assault into Nogales, Mexico. The Mexicans eventually surrendered after both sides sustained heavy casualties. A few months earlier, just west of Nogales, an Indian War battle had occurred, considered the last engagement in the American Indian Wars, which lasted from 1775 to 1918. U.S. soldiers stationed on the border confronted Yaqui Indians who were using Arizona as a base to raid the nearby Mexican settlements, as part of their wars against Mexico.

Arizona became a U.S. state on February 14, 1912, coinciding with Valentine's Day. Arizona was the 48th state admitted to the U.S. and the last of the contiguous states to be admitted.

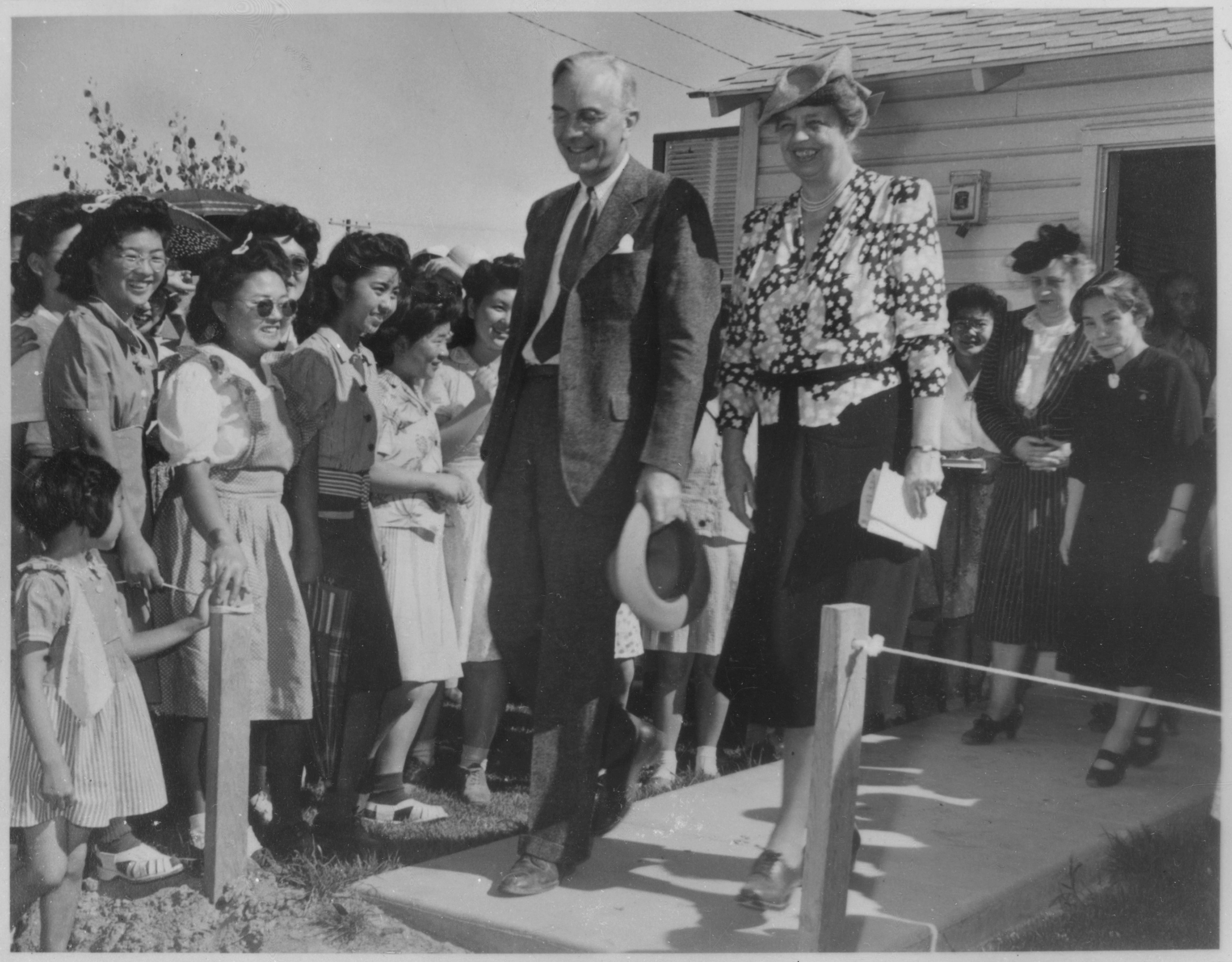
Eleanor Roosevelt at the Gila River relocation center, April 23, 1943

Cotton farming and copper mining, two of Arizona's most important statewide industries, suffered heavily during the Great Depression. During the 1920s and 1930s, tourism began to expand into a major economic pillar, developing into the prominent industry that characterizes the state today. Dude ranches, such as the K L Bar and Remuda in Wickenburg, along with the Flying V and Tanque Verde in Tucson, gave tourists the chance to take part in the flavor and activities of the "Old West". Several upscale hotels and resorts opened during this period, some of which are still top tourist draws. They include the Arizona Biltmore Hotel in central Phoenix (opened 1929) and the Wigwam Resort on the west side of the Phoenix area (opened 1936).

Arizona was the site of German prisoner of war camps during World War II and Japanese American internment camps. Because of wartime fears of a Japanese invasion of the U.S. West Coast (which in fact materialized in the Aleutian Islands Campaign in June 1942), from 1942 to 1945, persons of Japanese descent were forced to reside in internment camps built in the interior of the country. Many lost their homes and businesses. The camps were abolished after World War II.

The Phoenix-area POW camp site for Germans was purchased after the war by the Maytag family (of major home appliance fame). It was developed as the site of the Phoenix Zoo. A Japanese-American internment camp was on Mount Lemmon, just outside the state's southeastern city of Tucson. Another POW camp was near the Gila River in eastern Yuma County. Arizona was also home to the Phoenix Indian School, one of several federal Indian boarding schools designed to assimilate Native American children into mainstream European-American culture. Children were often enrolled in these schools against the wishes of their parents and families. Attempts to suppress native identities included forcing the children to cut their hair, to take and use English names, to speak only English, and to practice Christianity rather than their native religions.

Numerous Native Americans from Arizona fought for the United States during World War II. Their experiences resulted in a rising activism in the postwar years to achieve better treatment and civil rights after their return to the state. After Maricopa County did not allow them to register to vote, in 1948 veteran Frank Harrison and Harry Austin, of the Mojave-Apache Tribe at Fort McDowell Indian Reservation, brought a legal suit, Harrison and Austin v. Laveen, to challenge this exclusion. The Arizona Supreme Court ruled in their favor.

Arizona's population grew tremendously with residential and business development after World War II, aided by the widespread use of air conditioning, which made the intensely hot summers more comfortable. According to the Arizona Blue Book (published by the Arizona Secretary of State's office each year), the state population in 1910 was 294,353. By 1970, it was 1,752,122. The percentage growth each decade averaged about 20% in the earlier decades, and about 60% each decade thereafter.

In the 1960s, retirement communities were developed. These age-restricted subdivisions catered exclusively to the needs of senior citizens and attracted many retirees who wanted to escape the harsh winters of the Midwest and the Northeast. Sun City, established by developer Del Webb and opened in 1960, was one of the first such communities. Green Valley, south of Tucson, was another such community, designed as a retirement subdivision for Arizona's teachers. Many senior citizens from across the United States and Canada come to Arizona each winter and stay only during the winter months; they are referred to as snowbirds.

In March 2000, Arizona was the site of the first legally binding election ever held over the internet to nominate a candidate for public office. In the 2000 Arizona Democratic Primary, under worldwide attention, Al Gore defeated Bill Bradley. Voter turnout in this state primary increased more than 500% over the 1996 primary.

In the 21st century, Arizona has frequently garnered national attention for its efforts to quell illegal immigration into the state. In 2004, voters passed Proposition 200, requiring proof of citizenship to register to vote. The Supreme Court of the United States struck this restriction down in 2013. In 2010, Arizona enacted SB 1070 which required all immigrants to carry immigration papers at all times, but the Supreme Court also invalidated parts of this law in Arizona v. United States in 2012.

On January 8, 2011, a gunman shot congresswoman Gabby Giffords and 18 others at a gathering in Tucson. Giffords was critically wounded. The incident sparked national attention regarding incendiary political rhetoric.

Three ships named USS Arizona have been christened in honor of the state.

== Geography ==
Köppen climate types of Arizona

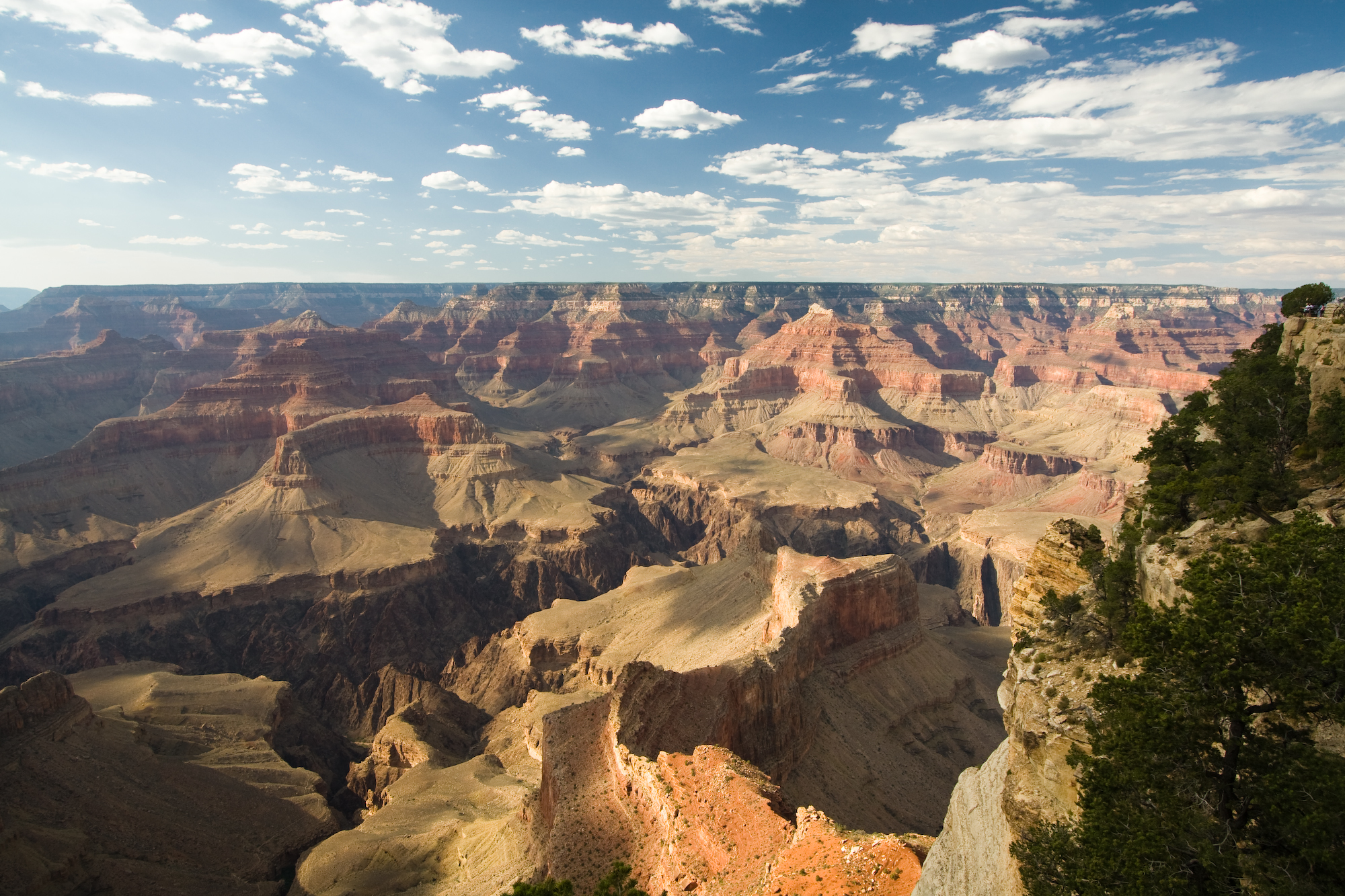
The Grand Canyon

Arizona municipalities

Arizona is in the Southwestern United States as one of the Four Corners states. Arizona is the sixth largest state by area, ranked after New Mexico and before Nevada. Of the state's 113,998 square miles (295,000 km^{2}), approximately 15% is privately owned. The remaining area is public forest and parkland, state trust land and Native American reservations. There are 24 National Park Service maintained sites in Arizona, including the four national parks of Grand Canyon National Park, Saguaro National Park, Petrified Forest National Park, and Chiricahua National Park.

Arizona is well known for its desert Basin and Range region in the state's southern portions, which is rich in a landscape of xerophyte plants such as the cactus. This region's topography was shaped by prehistoric volcanism, followed by the cooling-off and related subsidence. Its climate has exceptionally hot summers and mild winters. The state is less well known for its pine-covered north-central portion of the high country of the Colorado Plateau (see Arizona Mountains forests).

Like other states of the Southwest United States, Arizona is marked by high mountains, the Colorado plateau, and mesas. Despite the state's aridity, 27% of Arizona is forest, a percentage comparable to modern-day Romania or Greece. The world's largest stand of ponderosa pine trees is in Arizona.

The Mogollon Rim (/moʊɡəˈjoʊn/), a 1,998-foot (609 m) escarpment, cuts across the state's central section and marks the southwestern edge of the Colorado Plateau. In 2002, this was an area of the Rodeo–Chediski Fire, the worst fire in state history until 2011.

Located in northern Arizona, the Grand Canyon is a colorful, deep, steep-sided gorge, carved by the Colorado River. The canyon is one of the Seven Natural Wonders of the World and is largely contained in the Grand Canyon National Park – one of the first national parks in the United States. President Theodore Roosevelt was a major proponent of designating the Grand Canyon area as a National Park, often visiting to hunt mountain lion and enjoy the scenery. The canyon was created by the Colorado River cutting a channel over millions of years, and is about 277 miles (446 km) long, ranges in width from 4 to 18 miles (6 to 29 km) and attains a depth of more than 1 mile (1.6 km). Nearly two billion years of the Earth's history have been exposed as the Colorado River and its tributaries cut through layer after layer of sediment as the Colorado Plateau uplifted.

Arizona is home to one of the most well-preserved meteorite impact sites in the world. Created around 50,000 years ago, the Barringer Meteorite Crater (better known simply as "Meteor Crater") is a gigantic hole in the middle of the high plains of the Colorado Plateau, about 25 miles (40 km) west of Winslow. A rim of smashed and jumbled boulders, some of them the size of small houses, rises 150 feet (46 m) above the level of the surrounding plain. The crater itself is nearly a mile (1.6 kilometers) wide and 570 feet (170 m) deep.

Arizona is one of two U.S. states, along with Hawaii, that does not observe Daylight Saving Time, though the large Navajo Nation in the state's northeastern region does.

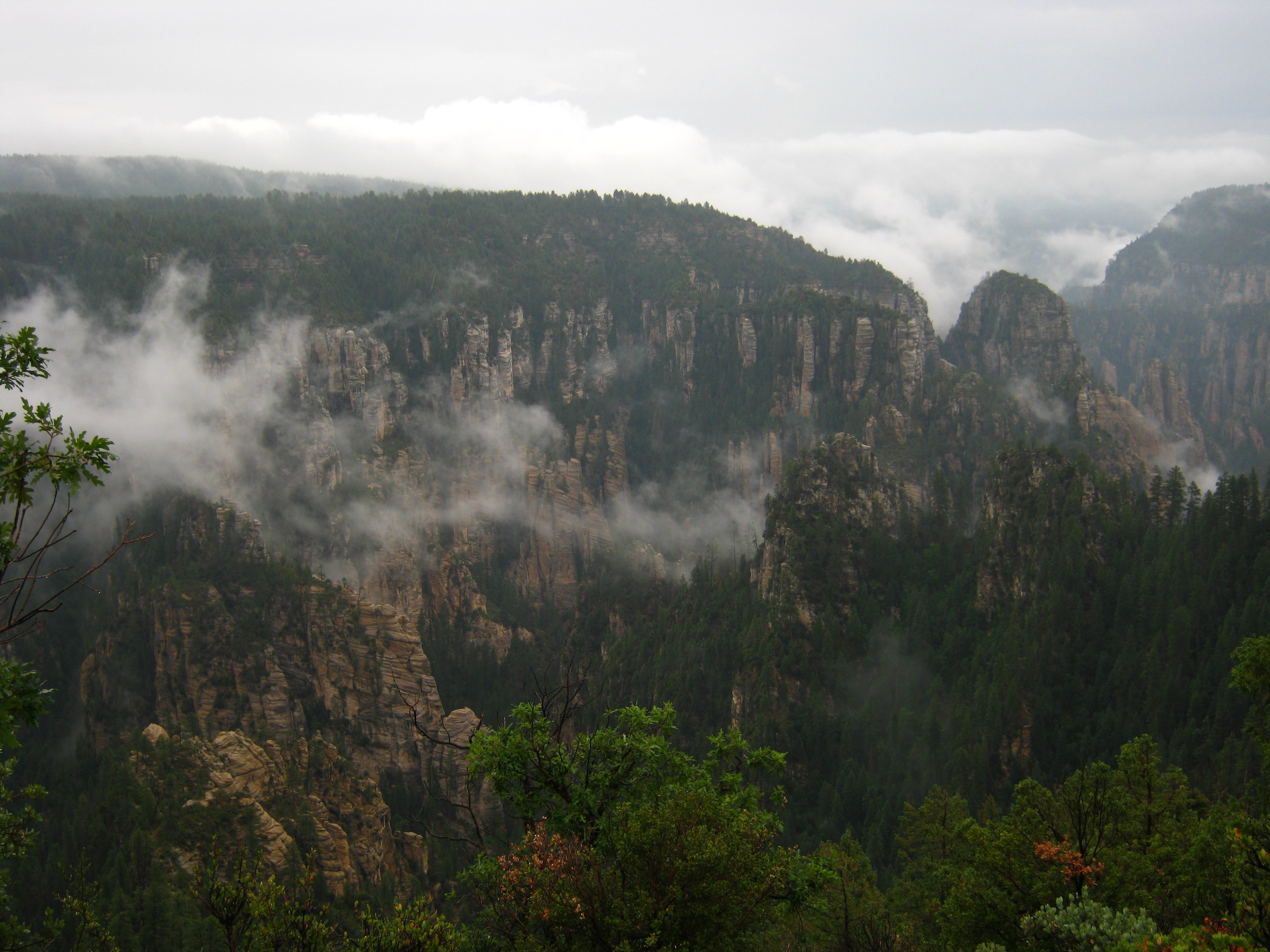
Sycamore Canyon

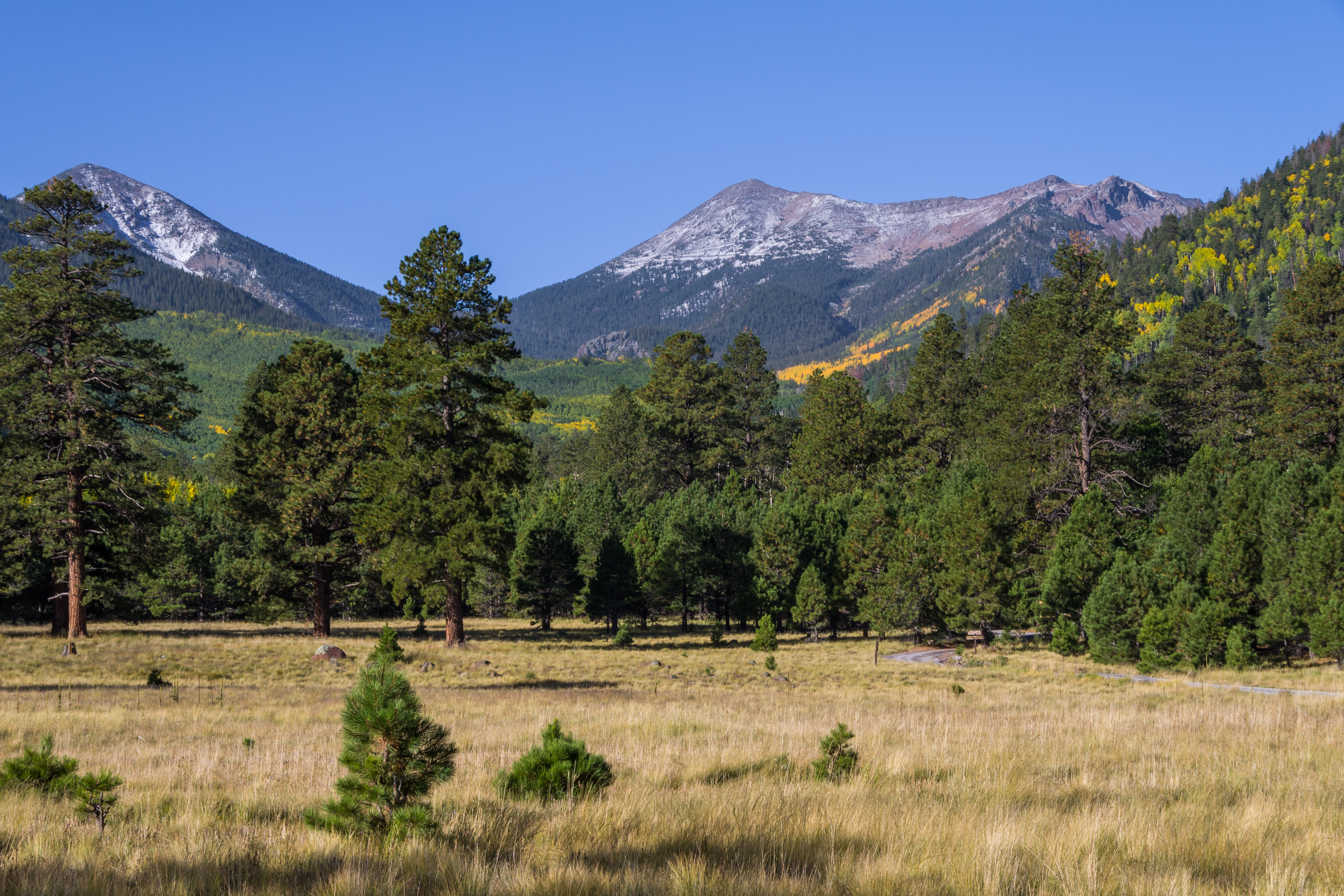
San Francisco Peaks

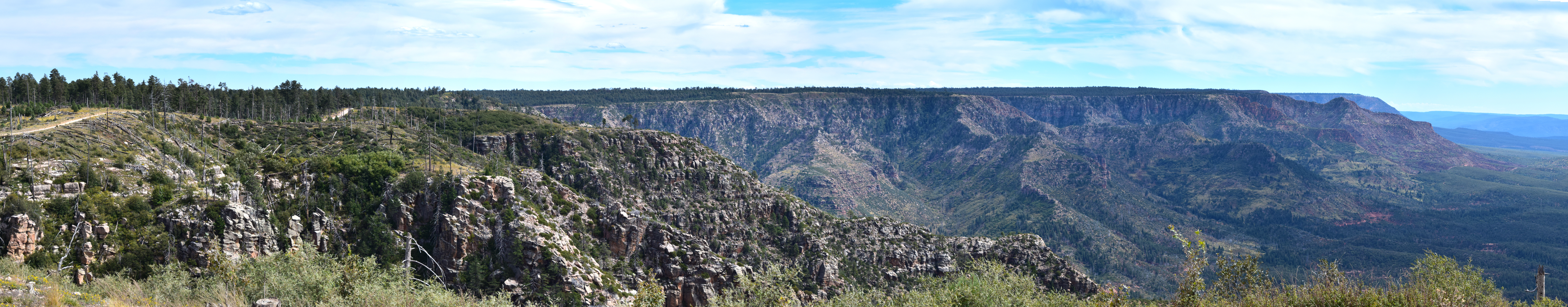
Mogollon Rim

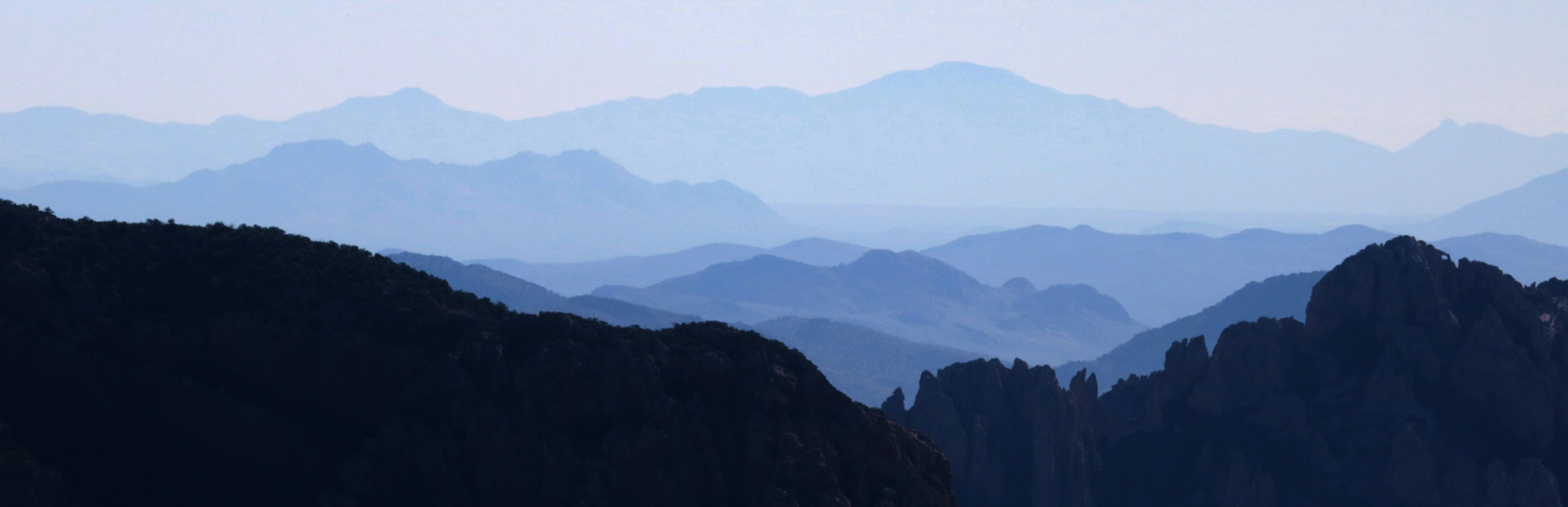
Chiricahua Mountains

Sonoran Desert

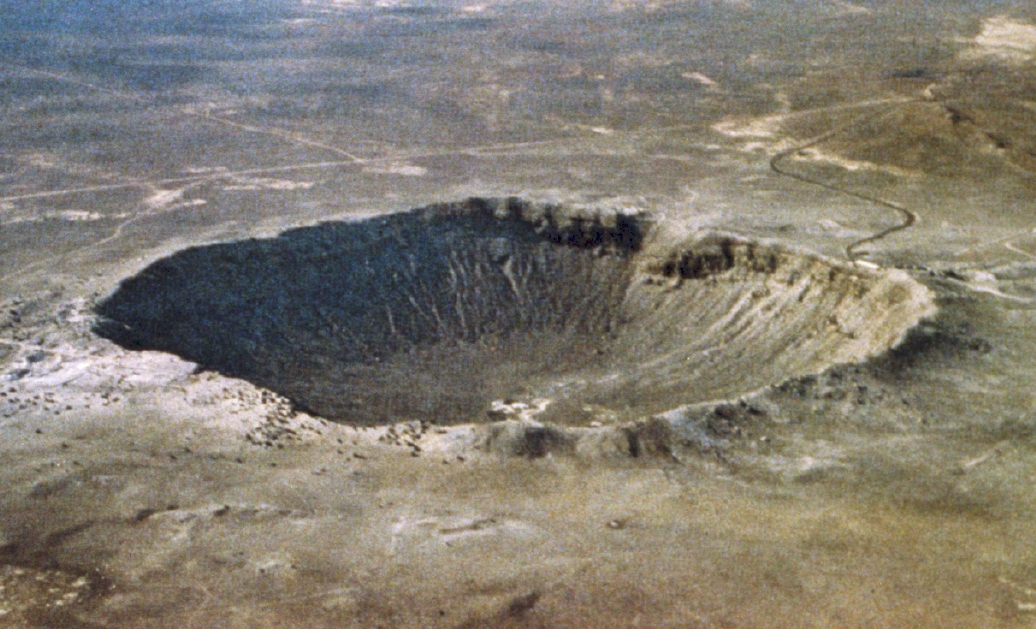
Meteor Crater

=== Adjacent states ===
- Utah (north)
- Colorado (northeast)
- Nevada (northwest)
- Sonora, Mexico (south)
- Baja California, Mexico (southwest)
- New Mexico (east)
- California (west)

=== Cities and towns ===
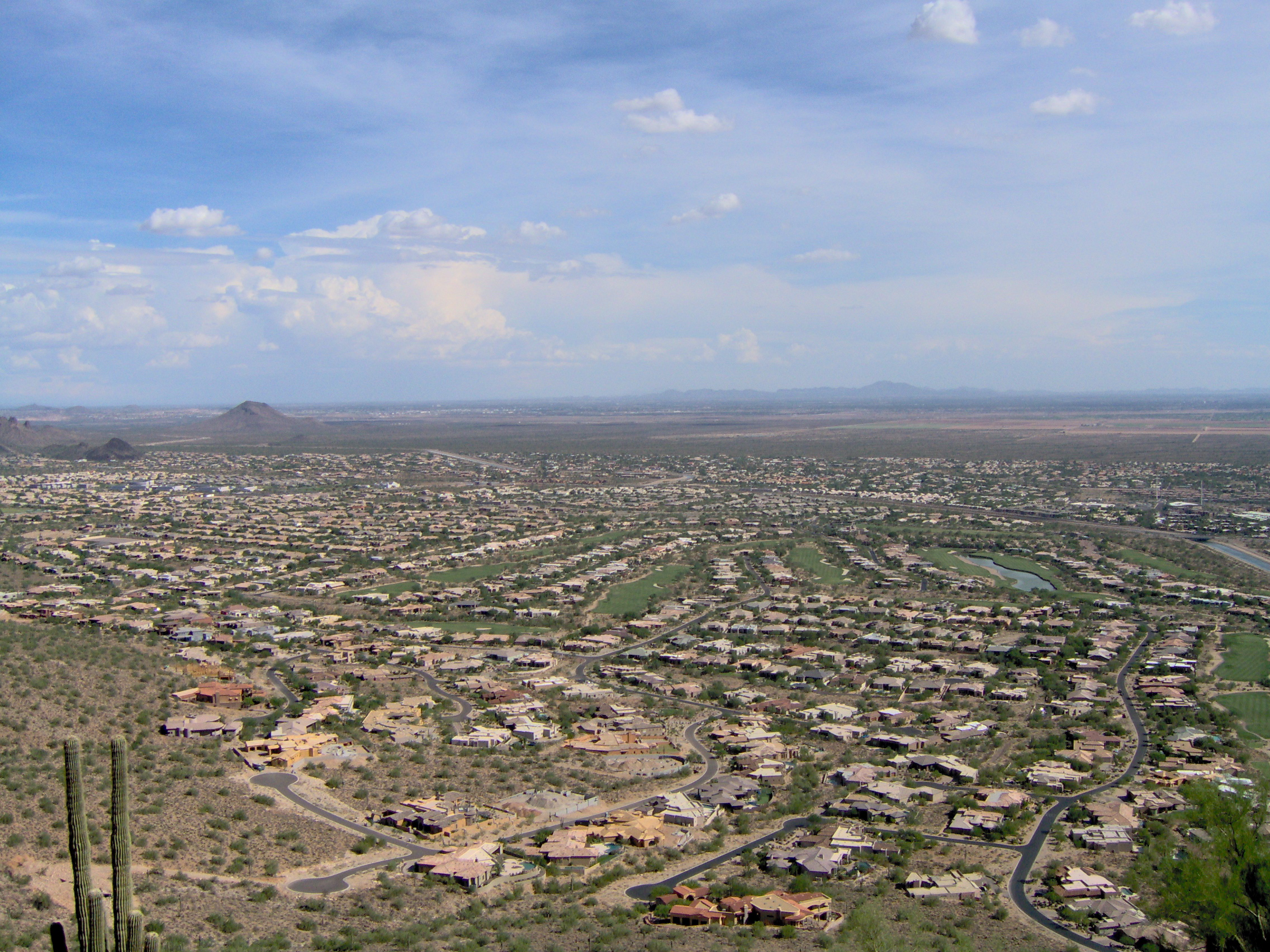
View of suburban development in Scottsdale, 2006

Phoenix, in Maricopa County, is Arizona's capital and largest city. Other prominent cities in the Phoenix metro area include Mesa (Arizona's third largest city), Chandler (Arizona's fourth largest city), Glendale, Peoria, Buckeye, Sun City, Sun City West, Fountain Hills, Surprise, Gilbert, El Mirage, Avondale, Tempe, Tolleson and Scottsdale, with a total metropolitan population of just over 4.7 million. The average high temperature in July, 106 °F (41 °C), is one of the highest of any metropolitan area in the United States, offset by an average January high temperature of 67 °F (19 °C), the basis of its winter appeal.

Tucson, with a metro population of just over one million, is the state's second-largest city. Located in Pima County, approximately 110 miles (180 km) southeast of Phoenix, it was incorporated in 1877, making it the oldest incorporated city in Arizona. It is home to the University of Arizona. Major incorporated suburbs of Tucson include Oro Valley and Marana northwest of the city, Sahuarita south of the city, and South Tucson in an enclave south of downtown. It has an average July temperature of 100 °F (38 °C) and winter temperatures averaging 65 °F (18 °C). Saguaro National Park, just west of the city in the Tucson Mountains, is the site of the world's largest collection of Saguaro cacti.

The Prescott metropolitan area includes the cities of Prescott, Cottonwood, Camp Verde and many other towns in the 8,123 square miles (21,000 km^{2}) of Yavapai County area. With 212,635 residents, this cluster of towns is the state's third largest metropolitan area. The city of Prescott (population 41,528) lies approximately 100 miles (160 km) northwest of the Phoenix metropolitan area. Situated in pine tree forests at an elevation of about 5,500 feet (1,700 m), Prescott enjoys a much cooler climate than Phoenix, with average summer highs around 88 °F (31 °C) and winter temperatures averaging 50 °F (10 °C).

Yuma is the center of the fourth-largest metropolitan area in Arizona. Located in Yuma County, it is near the borders of California and Mexico. It is one of the hottest cities in the United States, with an average July high of 107 °F (42 °C). For comparison, the same month's average in Death Valley is 115 °F (46 °C). The city features sunny days about 90% of the year. The Yuma Metropolitan Statistical Area has a population of 160,000. Yuma attracts many winter visitors from all over the United States.

Flagstaff, in Coconino County, is the largest city in northern Arizona, and is at an elevation of nearly 7,000 feet (2,100 m). With its large Ponderosa pine forests, snowy winter weather and picturesque mountains, it is a stark contrast to the desert regions typically associated with Arizona. It is sited at the base of the San Francisco Peaks, the highest mountain range in the state of Arizona, which contains Humphreys Peak, the highest point in Arizona at 12,633 feet (3,851 m). Flagstaff has a strong tourism sector, due to its proximity to numerous tourist attractions including: Grand Canyon National Park, Sedona, and Oak Creek Canyon. Historic U.S. Route 66 is the main east–west street in the town. The Flagstaff metropolitan area is home to 134,421 residents and the main campus of Northern Arizona University.

Lake Havasu City, in Mohave County, known as "Arizona's playground", was developed on the Colorado River and is named after Lake Havasu. Lake Havasu City has a population of about 57,000 people. It is famous for huge spring break parties, sunsets and the London Bridge, relocated from London, England. Lake Havasu City was founded by real estate developer Robert P. McCulloch in 1963. It has two colleges, Mohave Community College and ASU Colleges in Lake Havasu City.

Largest cities or towns in Arizona Source:
Rank	Name	County	Pop.	Rank	Name	County	Pop.
1	Phoenix	Maricopa	1,624,569	11	Goodyear	Maricopa	101,733
2	Tucson	Pima	543,242	12	Buckeye	Maricopa	101,315
3	Mesa	Maricopa	509,475	13	Yuma	Yuma	97,093
4	Chandler	Maricopa	279,458	14	Avondale	Maricopa	90,564
5	Gilbert	Maricopa	273,136	15	Flagstaff	Coconino	76,989
6	Glendale	Maricopa	249,630	16	Queen Creek	Maricopa / Pinal	66,346
7	Scottsdale	Maricopa	242,753	17	Maricopa	Pinal	62,720
8	Peoria	Maricopa	194,917	18	Lake Havasu City	Mohave	58,284
9	Tempe	Maricopa	184,118	19	Casa Grande	Pinal	57,699
10	Surprise	Maricopa	149,191	20	Marana	Pima	54,895

== Climate ==
Köppen climate map of Arizona.

Due to its large area and variations in elevation, the state has a wide variety of localized climate conditions. In the lower elevations the climate is primarily desert, with mild winters and extremely hot summers. Typically, from late fall to early spring, the weather is mild, averaging a minimum of 60 °F (16 °C). November through February are the coldest months, with temperatures typically ranging from 40 to 75 °F (4 to 24 °C), with occasional frosts.

About midway through February, the temperatures start to rise, with warm days, and cool, breezy nights. The summer months of June through September bring a dry heat from 90 to 120 °F (32 to 49 °C), with occasional high temperatures exceeding 125 °F (52 °C) having been observed in the desert area. Arizona's all-time record high is 128 °F (53 °C) recorded at Lake Havasu City on June 29, 1994, and July 5, 2007; the all-time record low of −40 °F (−40 °C) was recorded at Hawley Lake on January 7, 1971.

Due to the primarily dry climate, large diurnal temperature variations occur in less-developed areas of the desert above 2,500 ft (760 m). The swings can be as large as 83 °F (46 °C) in the summer months. In the state's urban centers, the effects of local warming result in much higher measured night-time lows than in the recent past.

Arizona has an average annual rainfall of 12.7 in (323 mm), which comes during two rainy seasons, with cold fronts coming from the Pacific Ocean during the winter and a monsoon in the summer. The monsoon season occurs toward the end of summer. In July or August, the dewpoint rises dramatically for a brief period. During this time, the air contains large amounts of water vapor. Dewpoints as high as 81 °F (27 °C) have been recorded during the Phoenix monsoon season. This hot moisture brings lightning, thunderstorms, wind, and torrential, if usually brief, downpours. These downpours often cause flash floods, which can turn deadly. In an attempt to deter drivers from crossing flooding streams, the Arizona Legislature enacted the Stupid Motorist Law. It is rare for tornadoes or hurricanes to occur in Arizona.

Arizona's northern third is a plateau at significantly higher altitudes than the lower desert, and has an appreciably cooler climate, with cold winters and mild summers, though the climate remains semiarid to arid. Extremely low temperatures are not unknown; cold air systems from the northern states and Canada occasionally push into the state, bringing temperatures below 0 °F (−18 °C) to the state's northern parts.

Indicative of the variation in climate, Arizona is the state which has both the metropolitan area with the most days over 100 °F (38 °C) (Phoenix), and the metropolitan area in the lower 48 states with the most days with a low temperature below freezing (Flagstaff).

Average daily maximum and minimum temperatures for selected cities in Arizona
Location	July (°F)		July (°C)		December (°F)		December (°C)	
Location	Max	Min	Max	Min	Max	Min	Max	Min
Phoenix	106	83	41	28	66	45	19	7
Tucson	100	74	38	23	65	39	18	4
Yuma	107	82	42	28	68	46	20	8
Flagstaff	81	51	27	11	42	17	6	−8
Prescott	89	60	32	16	51	23	11	−5
Kingman	98	66	37	19	56	32	13	0

Arizona is considered as relatively vulnerable to climate change, which can make six of Arizona's 15 counties uninhabitable for humans by the years 2040–2060. This was the cautionary warning made by a December 2020 study released by ProPublica and Rhodium Group.

== Demographics ==
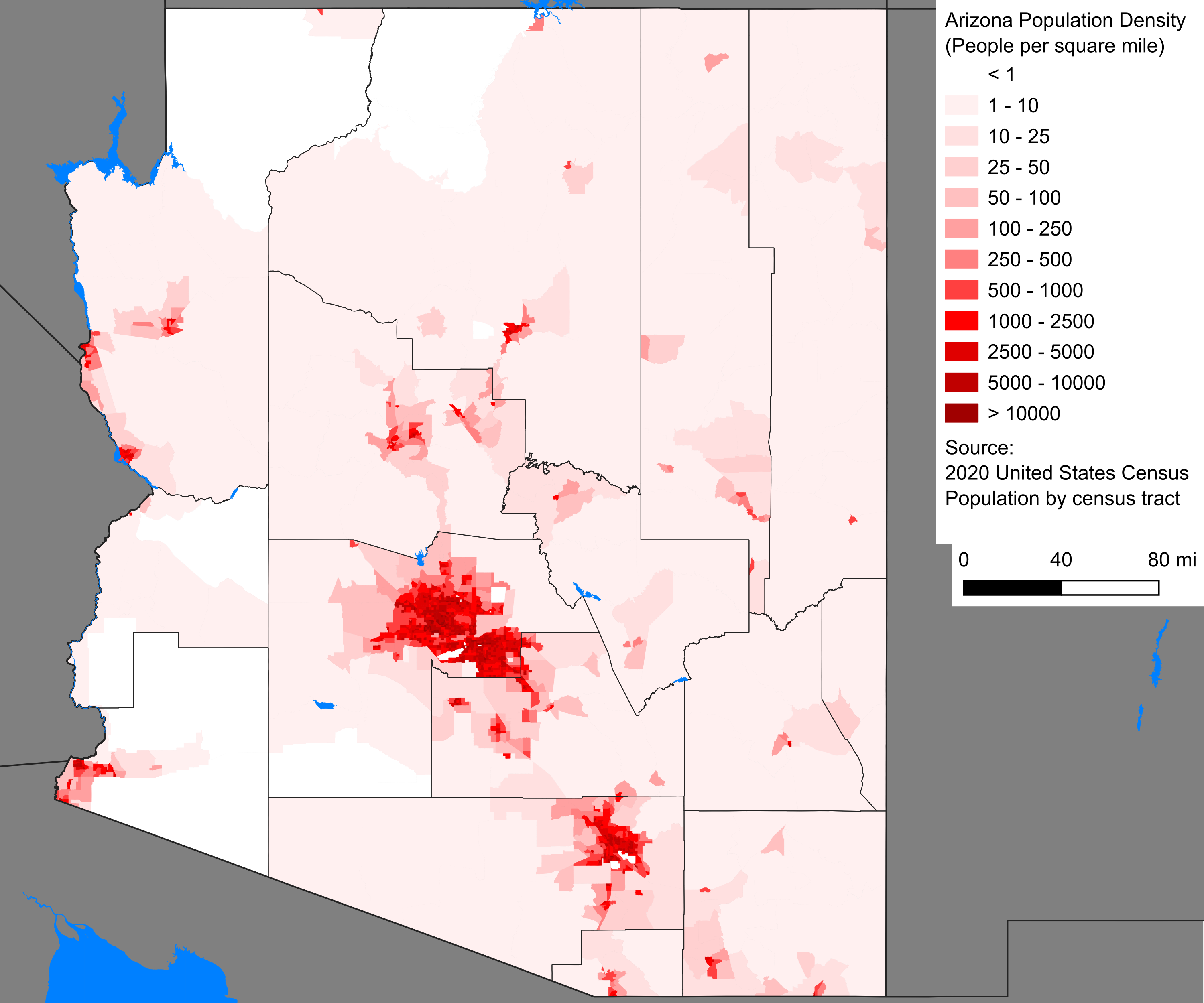
Population density map of Arizona, 2020

Map of counties in Arizona by racial plurality, per the 2020 U.S. census
Legend
- Non-Hispanic White
  40–50%
  50–60%
  60–70%
  70–80%
  Native American
  40–50%
  70–80%
  Hispanic or Latino
  60–70%
  80–90%

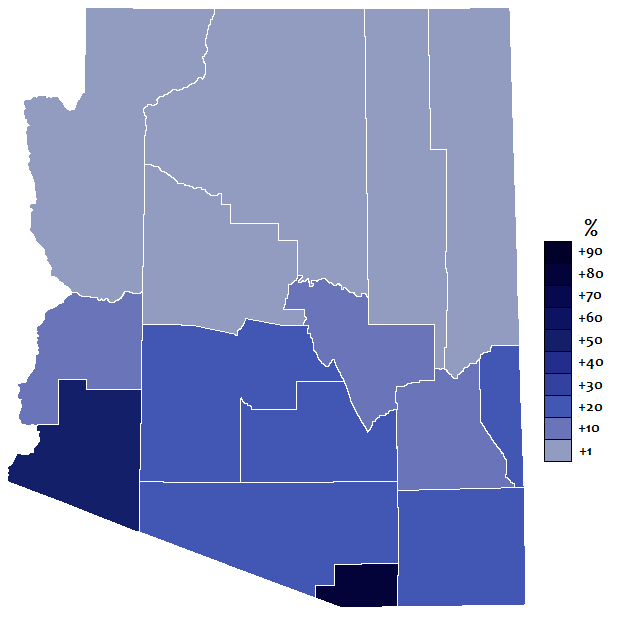
Spanish language use in Arizona

Historical population
Census	Pop.	Note	%±
1860	6,482		—
1870	9,658		49.0%
1880	40,440		318.7%
1890	88,243		118.2%
1900	122,931		39.3%
1910	204,354		66.2%
1920	334,162		63.5%
1930	435,573		30.3%
1940	499,261		14.6%
1950	749,587		50.1%
1960	1,302,161		73.7%
1970	1,770,900		36.0%
1980	2,718,215		53.5%
1990	3,665,228		34.8%
2000	5,130,632		40.0%
2010	6,392,017		24.6%
2020	7,151,502		11.9%
2025 (est.)	7,623,818		6.6%
Sources: 1910–2020; Note that early censuses may not include Native Americans in Arizona; 2024

The United States Census Bureau records Arizona's population as 7,151,502 in the 2020 census, a 12% increase since the 2010 United States census.

Arizona remained sparsely settled for most of the 19th century. The 1860 census reported the population of "Arizona County" to be 6,482, of whom 4,040 were listed as "Indians", 21 as "free colored", and 2,421 as "white". Arizona's continued population growth has put an enormous stress on the state's water supply. As of 2011, 61% of Arizona's children under age one belonged to racial groups of color.

The population of metropolitan Phoenix increased by 45% from 1991 through 2001, helping to make Arizona the second fastest-growing state in the U.S. in the 1990s (the fastest was Nevada).

According to the 2010 United States census, Arizona had a population of 6,392,017. In 2010, illegal immigrants constituted an estimated 8% of the population. This was the second highest percentage of any state in the U.S. (Note: Second to Nevada with 9% in 2010)

Metropolitan Phoenix (4.7 million) and Tucson (1.0 million) are home to about five-sixths of Arizona's people (as of the 2010 census). Metro Phoenix alone accounts for two-thirds of the state's population.

According to HUD's 2022 Annual Homeless Assessment Report, there were an estimated 13,553 homeless people living in Arizona.

As of 2018, the top countries of origin for Arizona's immigrant population were Mexico, Canada, India, the Philippines and China.

=== Race and ethnicity ===
Ethnic composition as of the 2020 census
Race and ethnicity	Alone	Total
White (non-Hispanic)	53.4%	56.8%
Hispanic or Latino (Note: Persons of Hispanic or Latino origin are not distinguished between total and partial ancestry.)	—	30.7%
African American (non-Hispanic)	4.4%	5.5%
Native American (non-Hispanic)	3.7%	4.9%
Asian	3.5%	4.5%
Pacific Islander	0.2%	0.4%
Other	0.4%	1.2%

Historical racial demographics
Racial composition	1970	1980	1990	2000	2010	2020
White (non-Hispanic)	73.3%	74.5%	71.7%	63.8%	57.8%	53.4%
Native (NH)	5.4%	5.4%	5.2%	4.6%	4%	3.7%
Black (NH)	3%	2.7%	2.9%	2.9%	4.1%	4.4%
Asian (NH)	0.5%	0.8%	1.4%	1.7%	2.8%	3.6%
Native Hawaiian and other Pacific Islander	–	–	–	0.1%	0.2%	0.2%
Other race (NH)	0.5%	0.1%	0.1%	0.1%	0.1%	0.4%
Two or more races (NH)	–	–	–	1.5%	3.4%	3.7%
Hispanic or Latino	17.3%	16.2%	18.8%	25.3%	29.6%	30.7%

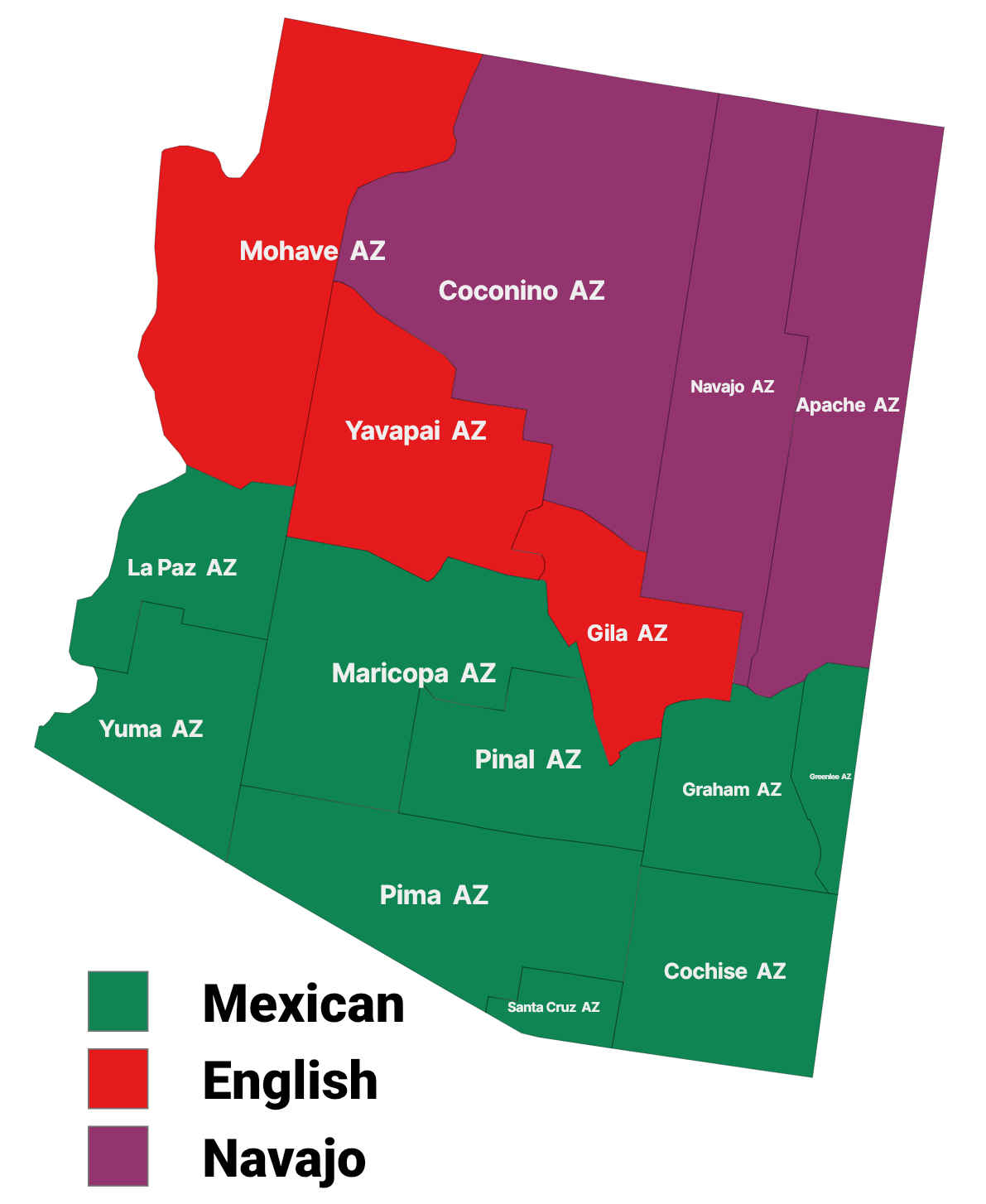
Largest alone or in any combination ethnic origin by county in Arizona, per the 2020 census

Arizona's largest ancestry groups, as of 2022, were:

1. Mexican (27.7%)
2. German (12%)
3. English (9.8%)
4. Irish (8.5%)
5. African (6.4%)
6. Navajo (2.2%)

=== Languages ===
Top 10 non-English languages spoken in Arizona
Language	Percentage of population (as of 2010)
Spanish	21%
Navajo	2%
German	<1%
Chinese (including Mandarin)	<1%
Tagalog	<1%
Vietnamese	<1%
Other North American indigenous languages (especially indigenous languages of Arizona)	<1%
French	<1%
Arabic	<1%
Apache	<1%
Korean	<1%

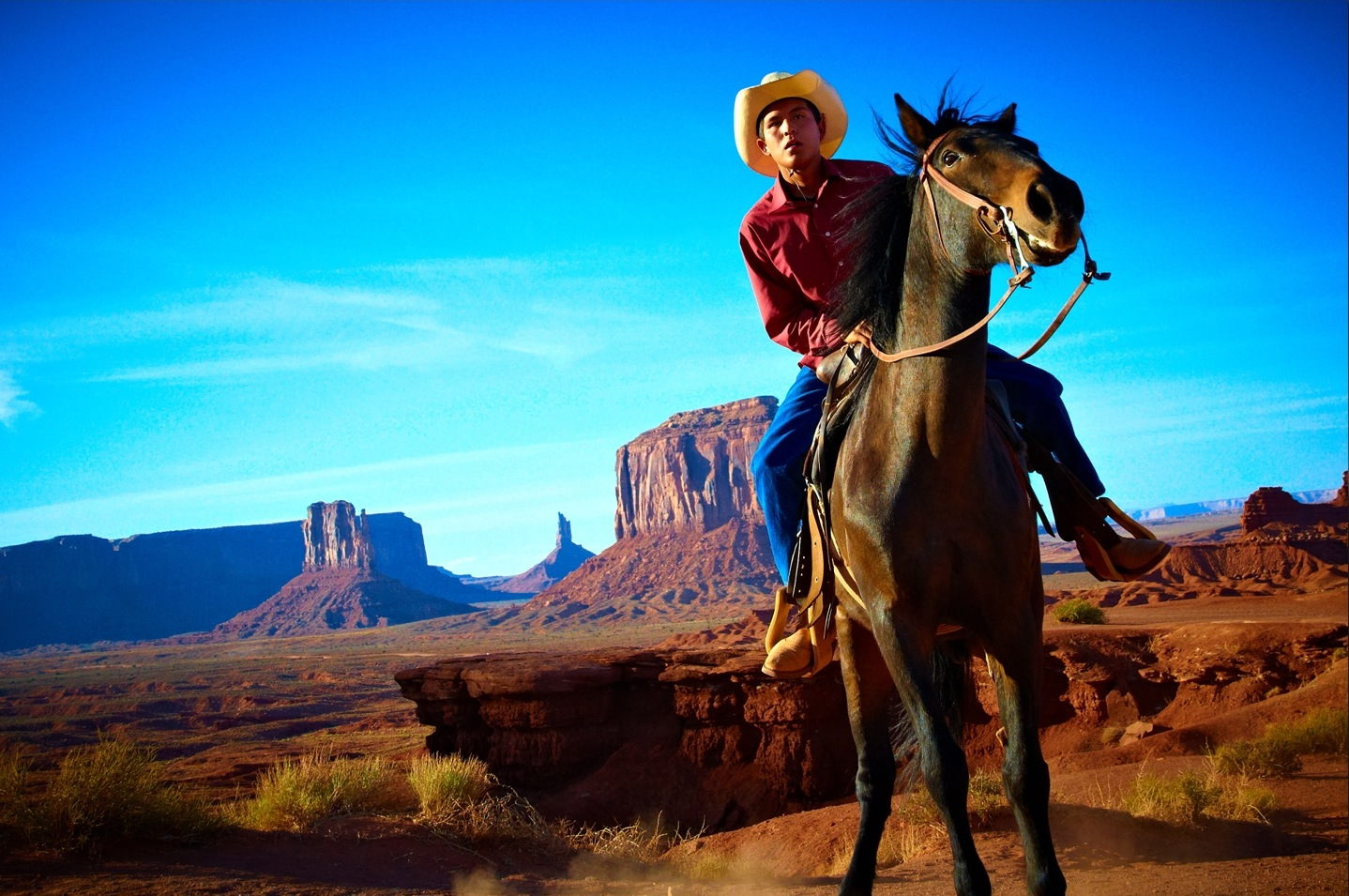
A Navajo man on horseback in Monument Valley

As of 2010, 73% (4,215,749) of Arizona residents age five and older spoke only English at home, while 21% (1,202,638) spoke Spanish, 2% (85,602) Navajo, <1% (22,592) German, <1% (22,426) Chinese (which includes Mandarin), <1% (19,015) Tagalog, <1% (17,603) Vietnamese, <1% (15,707) Other North American Indigenous Languages (especially indigenous languages of Arizona), and French was spoken as a main language by <1% (15,062) of the population over the age of five. In total, 27% (1,567,548) of Arizona's population age five and older spoke a mother language other than English.

Arizona is home to the largest number of speakers of Native American languages in the 48 contiguous states, as more than 85,000 individuals reported speaking Navajo, and 10,403 people reported Apache, as a language spoken at home in 2005. Arizona's Apache County has the highest concentration of speakers of Native American Indian languages in the United States.

=== Religion ===
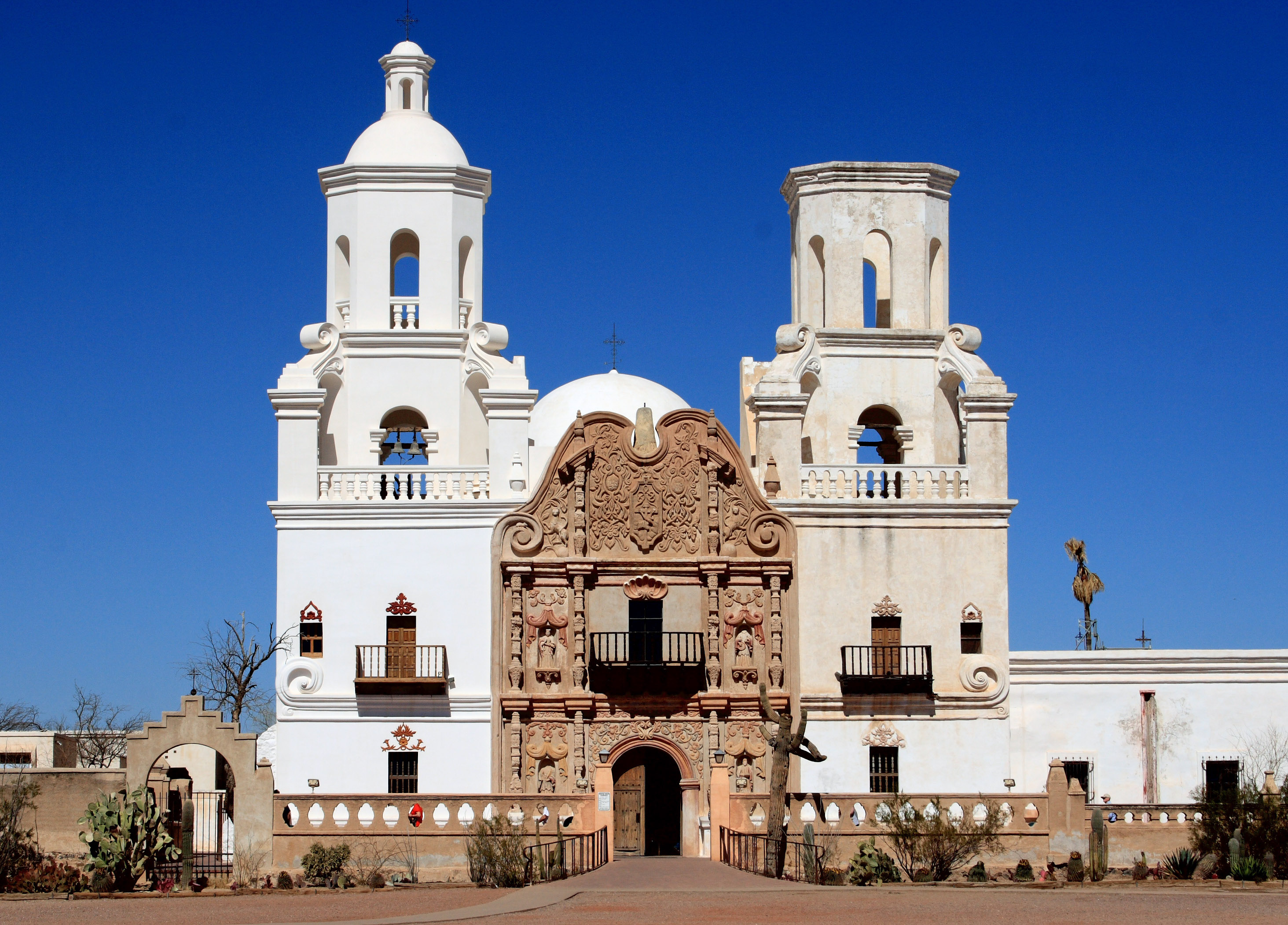
The Spanish mission of San Xavier del Bac, founded in 1700

Religious self-identification, per Public Religion Research Institute's 2022 American Values Survey
1. Protestantism (32.0%)
2. Catholicism (24.0%)
3. Mormonism (6.00%)
4. Jehovah's Witness (1.00%)
5. Unaffiliated (31.0%)
6. Judaism (2.00%)
7. New Age (1.00%)
8. Other (3.00%)

The 2010 U.S. Religion Census: Religious Congregations & Membership Study by ARDA reported that the three largest denominational groups in Arizona were the Catholic Church, the Church of Jesus Christ of Latter-Day Saints and non-denominational Evangelical Protestants. The Catholic Church had the highest number of adherents in Arizona (at 930,001), followed by the Church of Jesus Christ of Latter-day Saints with 392,918 members reported and then non-denominational Evangelical Protestant churches, reporting 281,105 adherents. The religious body with the largest number of congregations is The Church of Jesus Christ of Latter-day Saints (with 811 congregations) followed by the Southern Baptist Convention (with 323 congregations). This census accounted for about 2.4 million of Arizona's 6.4 million residents in 2010.

According to the study, the fifteen largest denominations by number of adherents in 2010 and 2000 were:

U.S. Religion Census: Religious Congregations & Membership Studies
Religion	2010 population	2000 population
Unclaimed	4,012,089	
Catholic Church	930,001	974,884
The Church of Jesus Christ of Latter-day Saints	392,918	251,974
Non-denominational Christianity	281,105	63,885 (Note: In 2000, this designation was broken into two groups: Independent, Non-Charismatic Churches (34,130 adherents) and Independent, Charismatic Churches (29,755 adherents).)
Southern Baptist Convention	126,830	138,516
Assemblies of God	123,713	82,802
United Methodist Church	54,977	53,232
Christian Churches and Churches of Christ	48,386	33,162
Evangelical Lutheran Church in America	42,944	69,393
Lutheran Church–Missouri Synod	26,322	24,977
Presbyterian Church (U.S.A.)	26,078	33,554
Episcopal Church (United States)	24,853	31,104
Seventh-day Adventist Church	20,924	11,513
Church of the Nazarene	16,991	18,143
Lutheran Congregations in Mission for Christ	14,350	0
Churches of Christ	14,151	14,471

Hinduism became the largest non-Christian religion (when combining all denominations) in 2010 with more than 32,000 adherents, followed by Judaism with more than 20,000 and Buddhism with more than 19,000.

By the publication of the Public Religion Research Institute's 2020 study, 68% of the population identified as Christian. At the Pew Research Center's 2014 study, 67% of Arizona was Christian. The irreligious or agnostic (or unaffiliated with any particular type of religion) population of 2014 to 2022 across three surveys ranged from 24% to 31% of Arizonans, in each survey forming a larger proportion than in most other U.S. states.

A third study by the Association of Religion Data Archives in 2020 also determined Christianity as the most prevalent religion in the state, with Catholics numbering 1,522,410 adherents and non-denominational Christians increasing to 402,842 Arizonan Christians.

=== Native American tribes ===
At the onset of European colonization what is now Arizona was inhabited by many Native American tribes, they included mainly the Navajo, the Apache, the Akimel O'odham, the Cocopah, the Halchidhoma, the Havasupai, Yavapai, and Hualapai, the Hopi, the Jocome and Jano, the Maricopa, the Mohave, the southern Paiute, the Tohono O'odham, the Yaqui, the Yuma and the Zuni Pueblo. Some of them still live in the state today.

The largest Native American tribes in Arizona according to the 2010 census are listed in the table below:

Tribal groupings with over 500 members in Arizona in 2010 census
Tribal grouping	American Indian and Alaska Native alone	AIAN in combination with one or more other races	Total AIAN alone or in any combination
Total AIAN population	296529	56857	353386
Navajo	133669	6594	140263
Apache	25761	2388	28149
Akimel O'odham	20233	1886	22119
Tohono Oʼodham	17314	1687	19001
Yaqui	14602	2760	17362
Hopi	10789	823	11612
Cherokee	3345	7833	11178
Mexican American Indian	4115	1681	5796
Quechan	4867	623	5490
Choctaw	1669	1847	3516
Sioux	2162	1316	3478
Pueblo	1818	452	2270
Ojibwe	1043	887	1930
Colorado River Indian Tribes	1763	156	1919
Blackfeet	420	1116	1536
Iroquois	650	625	1275
Yavapai Apache Nation	1024	179	1203
Muscogee	489	533	1022
Chickasaw	409	439	848
Ak-Chin Indian Community	650	194	844
Fort McDowell Yavapai Nation	721	59	780
Paiute	549	118	667
Potawatomi	345	229	574
Tribe not specified	44673	19341	64014

== Economy ==
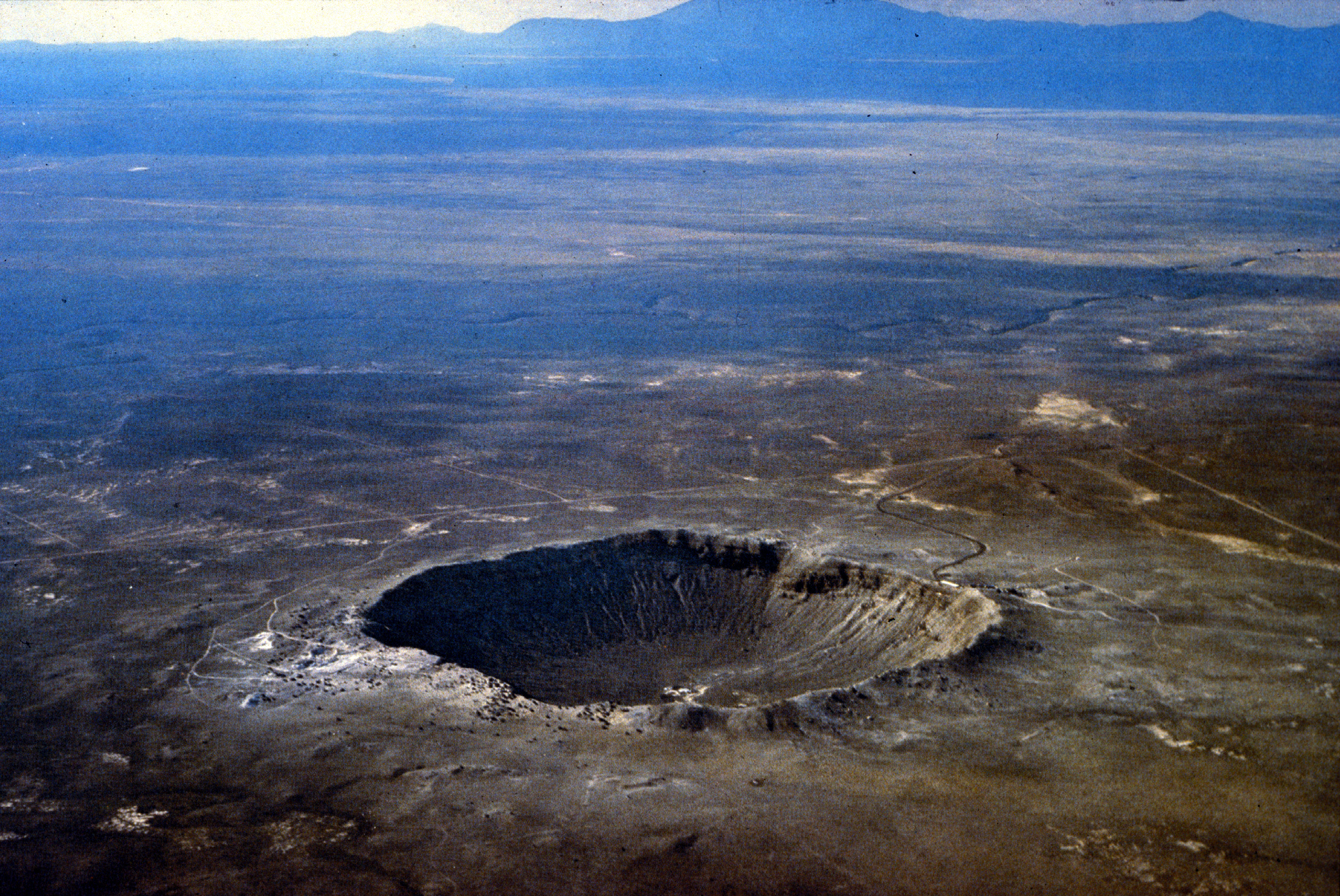
Arizona's Meteor Crater is a tourist attraction.

The economy of Arizona had a total gross state product in 2025 of $598.1 billion. The composition of the state's economy is moderately diverse, although health care, transportation and the government remain the largest sectors. Early in its history, Arizona's economy relied on the "five C's": copper, cotton, cattle, citrus, and climate. Copper is still extensively mined from many expansive open-pit and underground mines, accounting for two-thirds of the nation's output.

As of 2025, Arizona's largest trading partners include Mexico, Taiwan, Canada, and China.

Arizona's per capita personal income was $68,283 in 2025, ranking 36th in the U.S. The state's 2023 median household income was $74,568, ranking 19th in the country and just below the U.S. national mean.

=== Agriculture ===
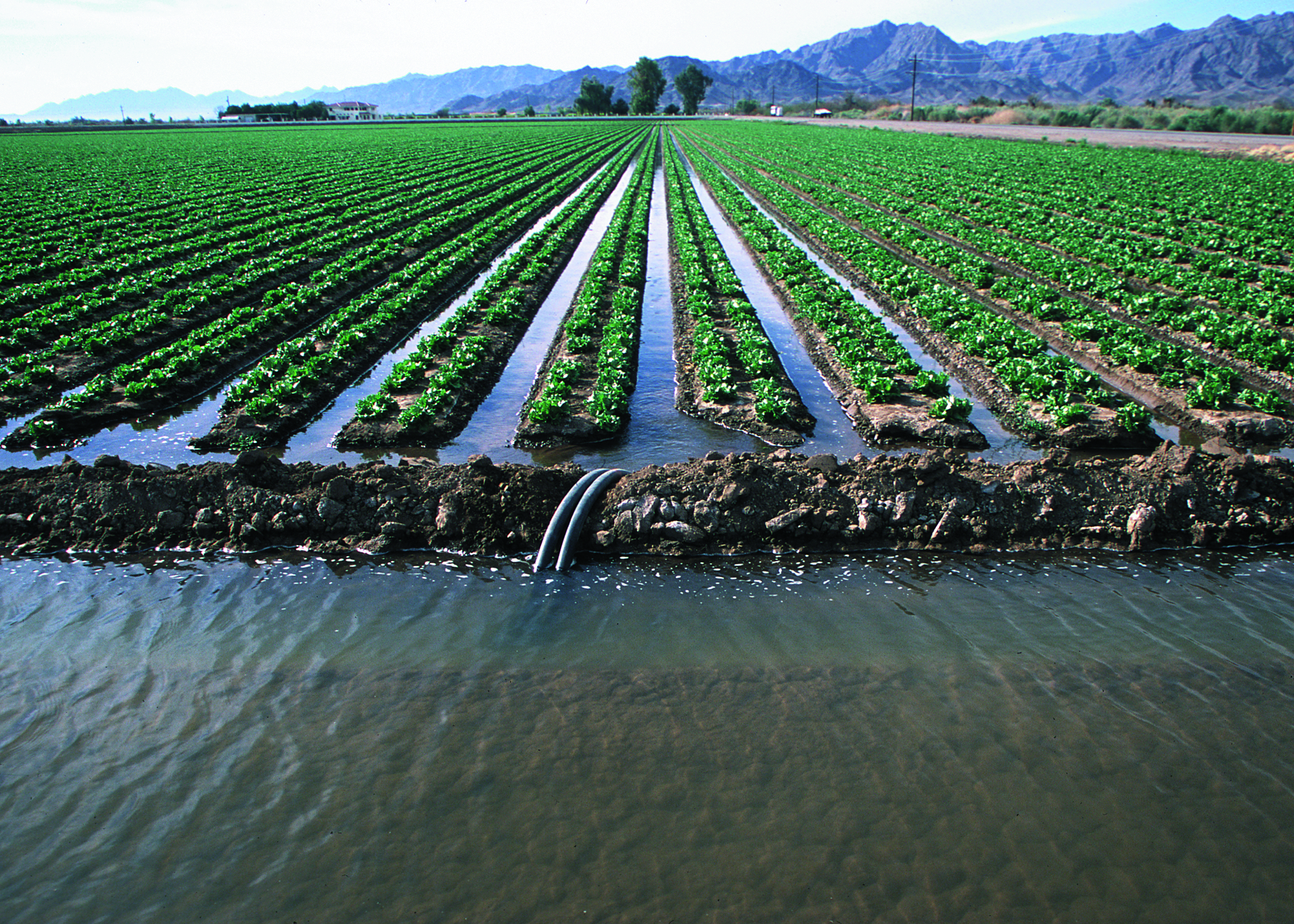
Romaine farms in Yuma

Multiple crops are grown in Arizona, including durum wheat, lettuce, spinach, cantaloupe, broccoli, cauliflower, cabbage, and watermelon.

Federal crop insurance is available for grape (Vitis vinifera and other Vitis spp.) here. Together with California's crop it falls under special provisions of the relevant crop insurance statutes. Insect pests and diseases are covered, excluding Phylloxera (Daktulosphaira vitifoliae) or failure to correctly apply insect control or apply disease control.

The whitefly Bemisia tabaci B was introduced through the poinsettia trade in the 1980s, displacing the previous A biotype. In 2004 the Q biotype (from the Mediterranean) was first found here, also on poinsettia.

The Colorado potato beetle (Leptinotarsa decemlineata) is either native or an early introduction here. Unusually, the population here commonly feeds on Silverleaf nightshade (Solanum elaeagnifolium), which is usually a less attractive host for this beetle. The CPB is an occasional pest of tomato.

== Transportation ==
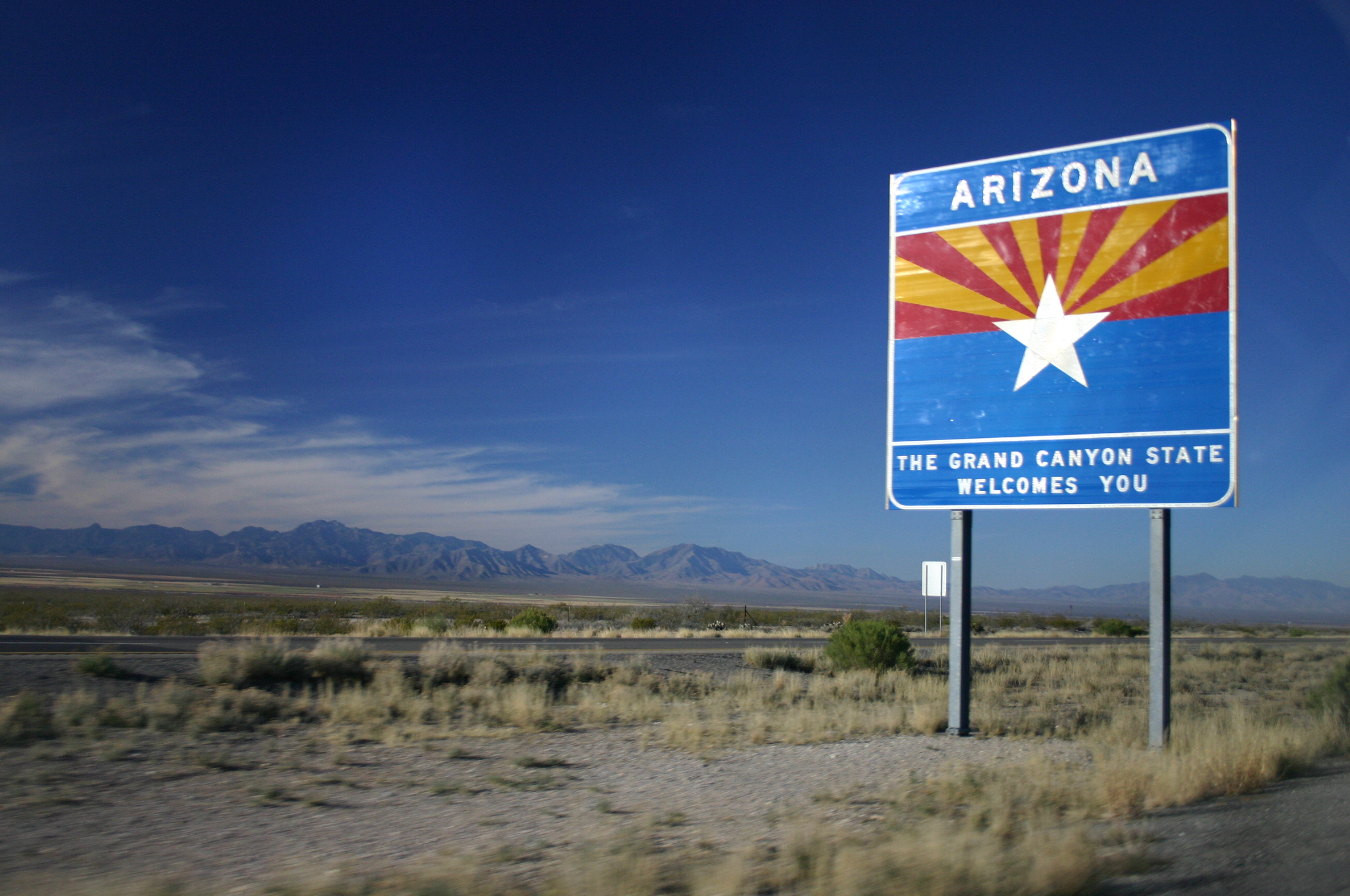
Entering Arizona on I-10 from New Mexico

=== Highways ===
==== Interstate highways ====
- I-8
- I-10
- I-15
- I-17
- I-19
- I-40

==== U.S. routes ====
- US 60
- US 64
- US 70
- US 89
- US 89A
- US 93
- US 95
- US 160
- US 163
- US 180
- US 191

Main Interstate routes include I-17, and I-19 traveling north–south, I-8, I-10, and I-40, traveling east–west, and a short stretch of I-15 traveling northeast–southwest through the extreme northwestern corner of the state. In addition, the various urban areas are served by complex networks of state routes and highways, such as the Loop 101, which is part of Phoenix's vast freeway system.

=== Public transportation, Amtrak, and intercity bus ===
The Phoenix and Tucson metropolitan areas are served by public bus transit systems. Yuma and Flagstaff also have public bus systems. Greyhound Lines serves Phoenix, Tucson, Flagstaff, Yuma, and several smaller communities statewide.

A light rail system, called Valley Metro Rail, was completed in December 2008; it connects Central Phoenix with the nearby cities of Mesa and Tempe.

In Tucson, the Sun Link streetcar system travels through the downtown area, connecting the main University of Arizona campus with Mercado San Agustin on the western edge of downtown Tucson. Sun Link, loosely based on the Portland Streetcar, launched in July 2014.

Amtrak Southwest Chief route serves the northern part of the state, stopping at Winslow, Flagstaff, Williams and Kingman. The Texas Eagle and Sunset Limited routes serve South-Central Arizona, stopping at Tucson, Maricopa, Yuma and Benson. Phoenix lost Amtrak service in 1996 with the rerouting of the Sunset Limited, and now an Amtrak bus runs between Phoenix and the station in Maricopa. As of 2021, Amtrak has proposed to restore rail service between Phoenix and Tucson.

== Law and government ==
=== Capitol complex ===
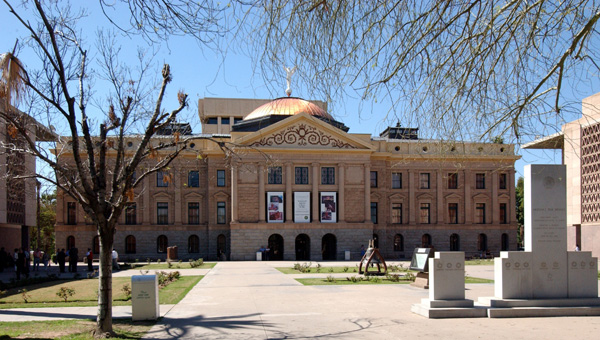
The original Arizona State Capitol in Phoenix

The capital of Arizona is Phoenix. The original Capitol building, with its distinctive copper dome, was dedicated in 1901 (construction was completed for $136,000 in 1900) when the area was a territory. Phoenix became the official state capital with Arizona's admission to the union in 1912.

The House of Representatives and Senate buildings were dedicated in 1960, and an Executive Office Building was dedicated in 1974 (the ninth floor of this building is where the Office of the Governor is located). The original Capitol building was converted into a museum.

The Capitol complex is fronted and highlighted by the richly landscaped Wesley Bolin Memorial Plaza, named after Wesley Bolin, a governor who died in office in the 1970s. The site also includes many monuments and memorials, including the anchor and signal mast from the USS Arizona (one of the U.S. Navy ships sunk in Pearl Harbor) and a granite version of the Ten Commandments.

=== State legislative branch ===
The Arizona Legislature is bicameral and consists of a thirty-member Senate and a 60-member House of Representatives. Each of the thirty legislative districts has one senator and two representatives. Legislators are elected for two-year terms.

Each Legislature covers a two-year period. The first session following the general election is known as the first regular session, and the session convening in the second year is known as the second regular session. Each regular session begins on the second Monday in January and adjourns sine die (terminates for the year) no later than Saturday of the week in which the 100th day from the beginning of the regular session falls. The President of the Senate and Speaker of the House, by rule, may extend the session up to seven additional days. Thereafter, the session can be extended only by a majority vote of members present of each house.

The majority party is the Republican Party, which has held power in both houses since 1993. The Democratic Party picked up several legislative seats in recent elections, bringing both chambers one seat away from being equally divided as of 2021.

Arizona state senators and representatives are elected for two-year terms and are limited to four consecutive terms in a chamber, though there is no limit on the total number of terms. When a lawmaker is term-limited from office, it is common for him or her to run for election in the other chamber.

=== State executive branch ===
State of Arizona elected officials
Governor	Katie Hobbs (D)
Secretary of State	Adrian Fontes (D)
Attorney General	Kris Mayes (D)
State Treasurer	Kimberly Yee (R)
Superintendent of Public Instruction	Tom Horne (R)
State Mine Inspector	Paul Marsh (R)
Corporation Commissioner	Nick Myers (R); Rachel Walden (R); Lea Márquez Peterson (R); René Lopez (R); Kevin Thompson (R)
Speaker of the House	Steve Montenegro (R)
President of the Senate	Warren Petersen (R)

Arizona's executive branch is headed by a governor, who is elected to a four-year term. The governor may serve any number of terms, though no more than two in a row. Arizona is one of the few states that has no governor's mansion. During their term, the governors reside within their private residence, with executive offices housed in the executive tower at the state capitol. The governor of Arizona is Katie Hobbs (D).

Governor Jan Brewer assumed office in 2009 after Janet Napolitano had her nomination by Barack Obama for Secretary of Homeland Security confirmed by the Senate. Arizona has had four female governors and a fifth currently serving, more than any other state.

Other elected executive officials include the Secretary of State, State Treasurer, State Attorney General, Superintendent of Public Instruction, State Mine Inspector, and a five-member Corporation Commission. All elected officials hold a term of four years, and are limited to two consecutive terms (except the office of the State Mine Inspector, which is limited to four terms).

Arizona has the distinction of having the most female governors of any state with five having served, the first and only state to have three consecutive female governors, and in 1998 elected women to all five top, statewide elected offices with the election of Jane Dee Hull as Governor, Betsey Bayless as Secretary of State, Janet Napolitano as Attorney General, Carol Springer as Treasurer, and Lisa Graham Keegan as Superintendent of Public Instruction.

Arizona is one of five states that do not have a lieutenant governor. The elected secretary of state is first in line to succeed the governor in the event of death, disability, resignation, or removal from office. If appointed, the Secretary of State is not eligible and the next governor is selected from the next eligible official in the line of succession, including the attorney general, state treasurer, and superintendent of public instruction. Since 1977, four secretaries of state and one attorney general have succeeded to the state's governorship.

On November 8, 2022, Arizona voters approved a state constitutional amendment (Proposition 131) that created the position and office of the lieutenant governor beginning with the 2026 elections. The position will be elected on a joint ticket with the governor. The lieutenant governor ascends to the governorship if the incumbent governor dies, resigns, or is removed (via impeachment conviction) from office. The proposition, through a law pre-passed by the state legislature, also tasks the governor with assigning a job to her or his running mate, such as chief of staff, the director of the state Department of Administration, or "any position" to which the governor can appoint someone by law.

=== State judicial branch ===
The Arizona Supreme Court is the highest court in Arizona, consisting of a chief justice, a vice chief justice, and five associate justices. Justices are appointed by the governor from a list recommended by a bipartisan commission and must be sustained in office by election after the first two years following their appointment. Subsequent sustaining elections occur every six years. The supreme court has appellate jurisdiction in death penalty cases, but nearly all other appellate cases go through the Arizona Court of Appeals first. The court has original jurisdiction in a few other circumstances, as outlined in the state constitution. The court meets in the Arizona Supreme Court Building at the capitol complex (at the southern end of Wesley Bolin Plaza).

The Arizona Court of Appeals, subdivided into two divisions, is the intermediate court in the state. Division One is based in Phoenix, consists of nineteen judges, and has jurisdiction in the Western and Northern regions of the state, along with the greater Phoenix area. Division Two is based in Tucson, consists of nine judges, and has jurisdiction over the Southern regions of the state, including the Tucson area. Judges are selected in a method similar to the one used for state supreme court justices.

Each county of Arizona has a superior court, the size and organization of which are varied and generally depend on the size of the particular county.

=== Counties ===
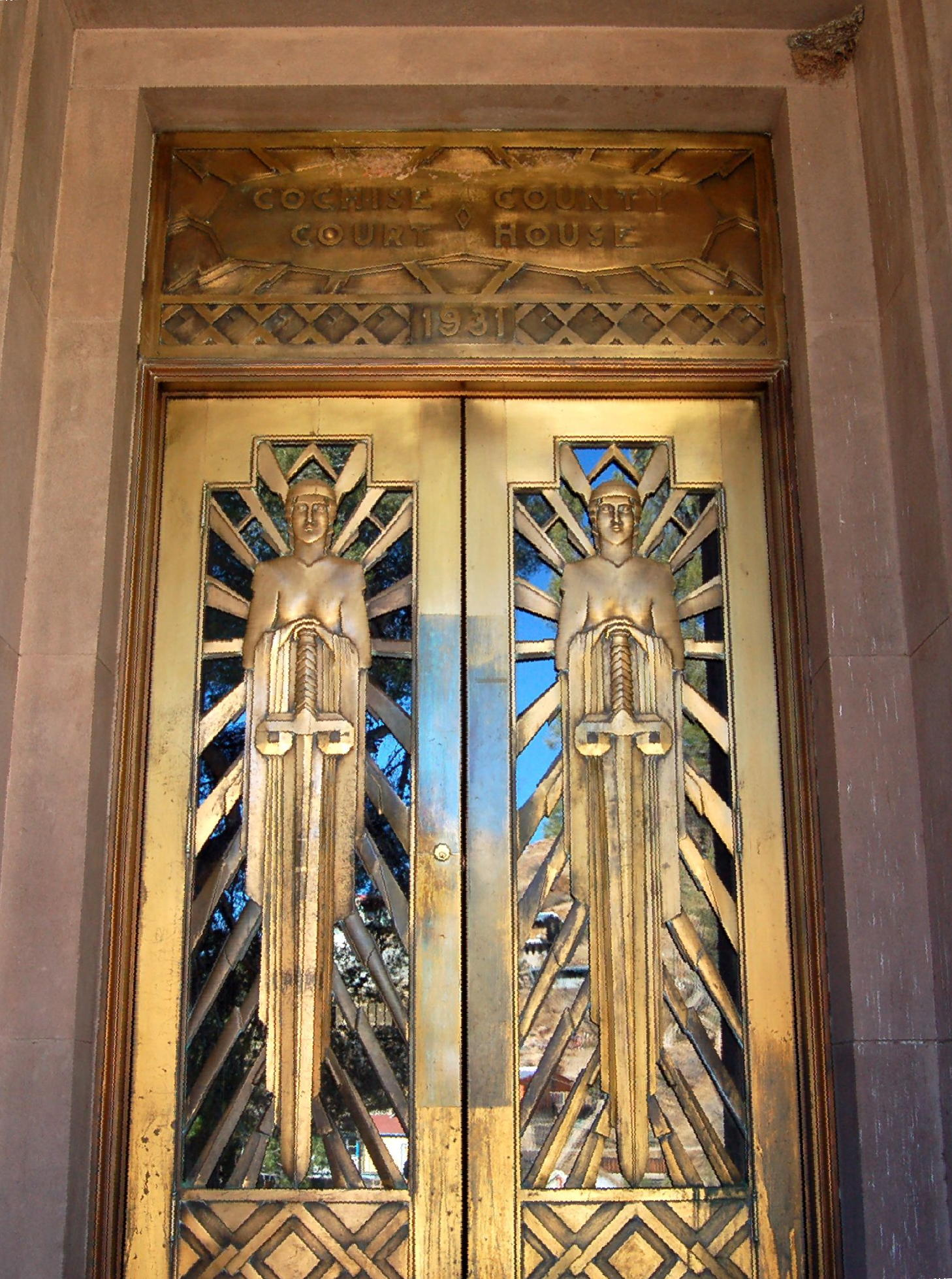
Art Deco doors of the Cochise County Courthouse in Bisbee

Arizona is divided into 15 counties, ranging in size from 1,238 square miles (3,210 km^{2}) to 18,661 square miles (48,330 km^{2}).

Arizona counties
County name	County seat	Founded	2020 population	Percent of total	Area (sq mi)	Percent of total
Apache	St. Johns	February 24, 1879	66,021	0.9%	11,218	9.8%
Cochise	Bisbee	February 1, 1881	125,447	1.8%	6,219	5.5%
Coconino	Flagstaff	February 18, 1891	145,101	2.0%	18,661	16.4%
Gila	Globe	February 8, 1881	53,272	0.7%	4,796	4.2%
Graham	Safford	March 10, 1881	38,533	0.5%	4,641	4.1%
Greenlee	Clifton	March 10, 1909	9,563	0.1%	1,848	1.6%
La Paz	Parker	January 1, 1983	16,557	0.2%	4,513	4.0%
Maricopa	Phoenix	February 14, 1871	4,420,568	61.8%	9,224	8.1%
Mohave	Kingman	November 9, 1864	213,267	3.0%	13,470	11.8%
Navajo	Holbrook	March 21, 1895	106,717	1.5%	9,959	8.7%
Pima	Tucson	November 9, 1864	1,043,433	14.6%	9,189	8.1%
Pinal	Florence	February 1, 1875	425,264	6.0%	5,374	4.7%
Santa Cruz	Nogales	March 15, 1899	47,669	0.7%	1,238	1.1%
Yavapai	Prescott	November 9, 1864	236,209	3.3%	8,128	7.1%
Yuma	Yuma	November 9, 1864	203,881	2.9%	5,519	4.8%
Totals: 15			7,151,502		113,997	

=== Federal representation ===
Arizona's two United States senators are and Mark Kelly (D) and Ruben Gallego (D).

Arizona's United States representatives are David Schweikert (R-1), Eli Crane (R-2), Yassamin Ansari (D-3), Greg Stanton (D-4), Andy Biggs (R-5), Juan Ciscomani (R-6), Adelita Grijalva (D-7), Abraham Hamadeh (R-8), and Paul Gosar (R-9). Arizona gained a ninth seat in the House of Representatives due to redistricting based on the 2010 United States census.

=== Political culture ===
Voter registration as of July 2026
Party	Number of voters	Percentage
Republican	1,523,886	35.39%
Other	1,490,185	34.60%
Democratic	1,210,510	28.11%
No Labels	46,246	1.07%
Libertarian	30,415	0.71%
Minor parties	5,312	0.12%
Total	4,306,554	100.00%

Party registration by Arizona county (January 2023) Democrat ≥ 30% Democrat ≥ 40% Democrat ≥ 50% Republican ≥ 30% Republican ≥ 40% Republican ≥ 50% Unaffiliated ≥ 30%

From statehood through the late 1940s, Arizona was primarily dominated by the Democratic Party. During this time, the Democratic candidate for the presidency carried the state each election, the only exceptions being the elections of 1920, 1924 and 1928 – all three were national Republican landslides.

In 1924, Congress had passed a law granting citizenship and suffrage to all Native Americans, some of whom had previously been excluded as members of tribes on reservations. Legal interpretations of Arizona's constitution prohibited Native Americans living on reservations from voting, classifying them as being under "guardianship". This interpretation was overturned as being incorrect and unconstitutional in 1948 by the Arizona Supreme Court, following a lawsuit by World War II Indian veterans Frank Harrison and Harry Austin, both of the Fort McDowell Yavapai Nation. The landmark case is Harrison and Austin v. Laveen. After the men were refused the opportunity to register in Maricopa County, they filed lawsuit against the registrar. The National Congress of American Indians, the Department of Justice, the Department of the Interior, and the American Civil Liberties Union all filed amicus curiae (friends of the court) briefs in the case. The State Supreme Court established the rights of Native Americans to vote in the state; at the time, they comprised about 11% of the population. That year, a similar provision was overturned in New Mexico when challenged by another Indian veteran in court. These were the only two states that had continued to prohibit Native Americans from voting.

Arizona voted Republican in every presidential election from 1952 to 1992, with Richard Nixon and Ronald Reagan winning the state by particularly large margins. During this forty-year span, it was the only state not to be carried by a Democrat at least once.

Democrat Lyndon Johnson, in 1964, lost the state by fewer than 5,000 votes to Arizona Senator and native Barry Goldwater. (This was the most closely contested state in an otherwise a landslide victory for Johnson that year.) Democrat Bill Clinton ended this streak in 1996, when he won Arizona by a little over two percentage points (Clinton had previously come within less than two percent of winning Arizona's electoral votes in 1992). From 2000 until 2016, the majority of the state continued to support Republican presidential candidates by solid margins. In the 2020 United States presidential election, Joe Biden again broke the streak by becoming the first Democratic presidential candidate to win Arizona since 1996 by 0.3% of the vote. Republican Donald Trump won the state in 2024.

Since the mid 20th century, the Republican Party has also dominated Arizona politics in general. The fast-growing Phoenix and Tucson suburbs became reliably Republican areas from the 1950s onward. During this time, many "Pinto Democrats", or conservative Democrats from rural areas, became increasingly willing to support Republicans at the state and national level. While the state normally supports Republicans at the federal level, Democrats are often competitive in statewide elections. Two of the last six governors have been Democrats.

On March 4, 2008, Senator John McCain effectively clinched the Republican nomination for 2008, becoming the first major party presidential nominee from the state since Barry Goldwater in 1964. McCain won Arizona by eight percentage points in the 2008 General Election.

Arizona politics is dominated by a longstanding rivalry between its two largest counties, Maricopa and Pima – home to Phoenix and Tucson, respectively. The two counties have almost 75 percent of the state's population and cast almost 80 percent of the state's vote. They also elect a substantial majority of the state legislature.

Maricopa County is home to almost 60 percent of the state's population, and most of the state's elected officials live there. Before Joe Biden won Maricopa County in 2020, it had voted Republican in every presidential election since 1952. This includes the 1964 run of native son Barry Goldwater; he would not have carried his home state without his 20,000-vote margin in Maricopa County.

In the 2024 General Election, former president Donald Trump won Maricopa County by 71,515 votes and won the state of Arizona by 187,382 votes, making the 5.5 percent statewide victory the largest percentage win of any of the seven 2024 swing states.

Pima County, home to Tucson, and most of southern Arizona have historically voted more Democratic. While Tucson's suburbs lean Republican, they hold to a somewhat more moderate brand of Republicanism than is common in the Phoenix area.

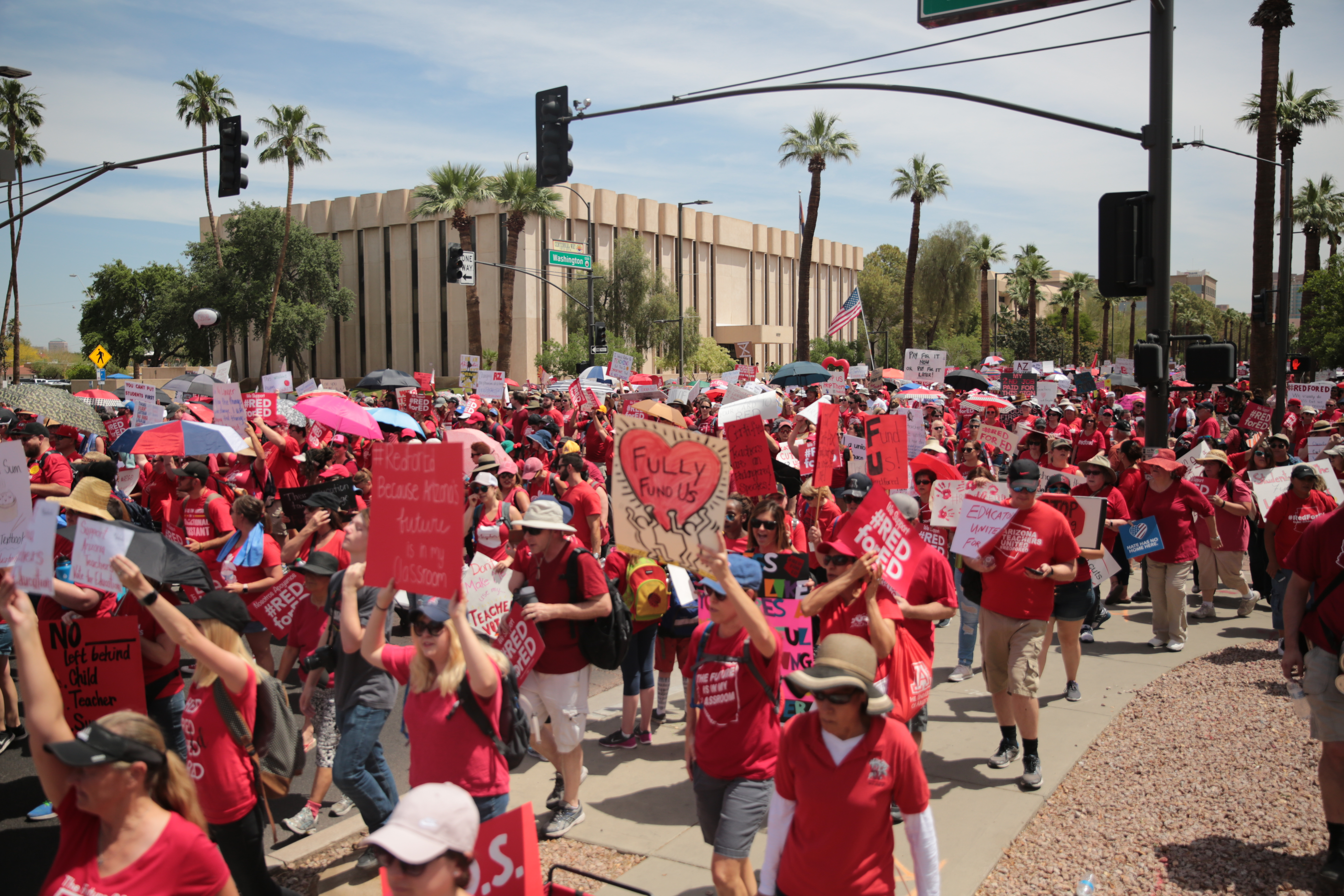
Arizona teacher's strike and rally on April 26, 2018

In 2010, Arizona adopted SB 1070, called the "toughest immigration law" in the United States. A fierce debate erupted between supporters and detractors of SB 1070. The United States Supreme Court struck down portions of the Arizona law, which required all immigrants to carry immigration papers at all times, in Arizona v. United States.

The West Virginia teachers' strike in 2018 inspired teachers in other states, including Arizona, to take similar action.

Arizona retains the death penalty. Authorized methods of execution include the gas chamber.

In 2024, Arizona voters passed a constitutional amendment recognising abortion access within the Arizona state constitution, becoming the southernmost continental state to codify abortion rights.

=== Same-sex marriage and civil unions ===
Arizona was initially the first U.S. state to reject a same-sex marriage ban in 2006 (proposition failed, 48%–52%) but passed a constitutional amendment prohibiting same-sex marriage two years later (56%–44%) with proponents enjoying a 10-to-1 advertising advantage and benefitting from a broadcast message from Roman Catholic Church Bishop Thomas Olmsted of Phoenix, calling the issue "non-negotiable" for Catholics and played at every mass in its jurisdiction. Several cities created civil unions in the years following the marriage ban. Following a federal district court ruling in October 2014, Arizona's Attorney General stopped objecting to same-sex marriage, making Arizona the 31st state to legalize it. Public opinion has shifted significantly, with 2023 polling showing overwhelming support for same-sex marriage among Arizonans.

== Education ==
=== Elementary and secondary education ===
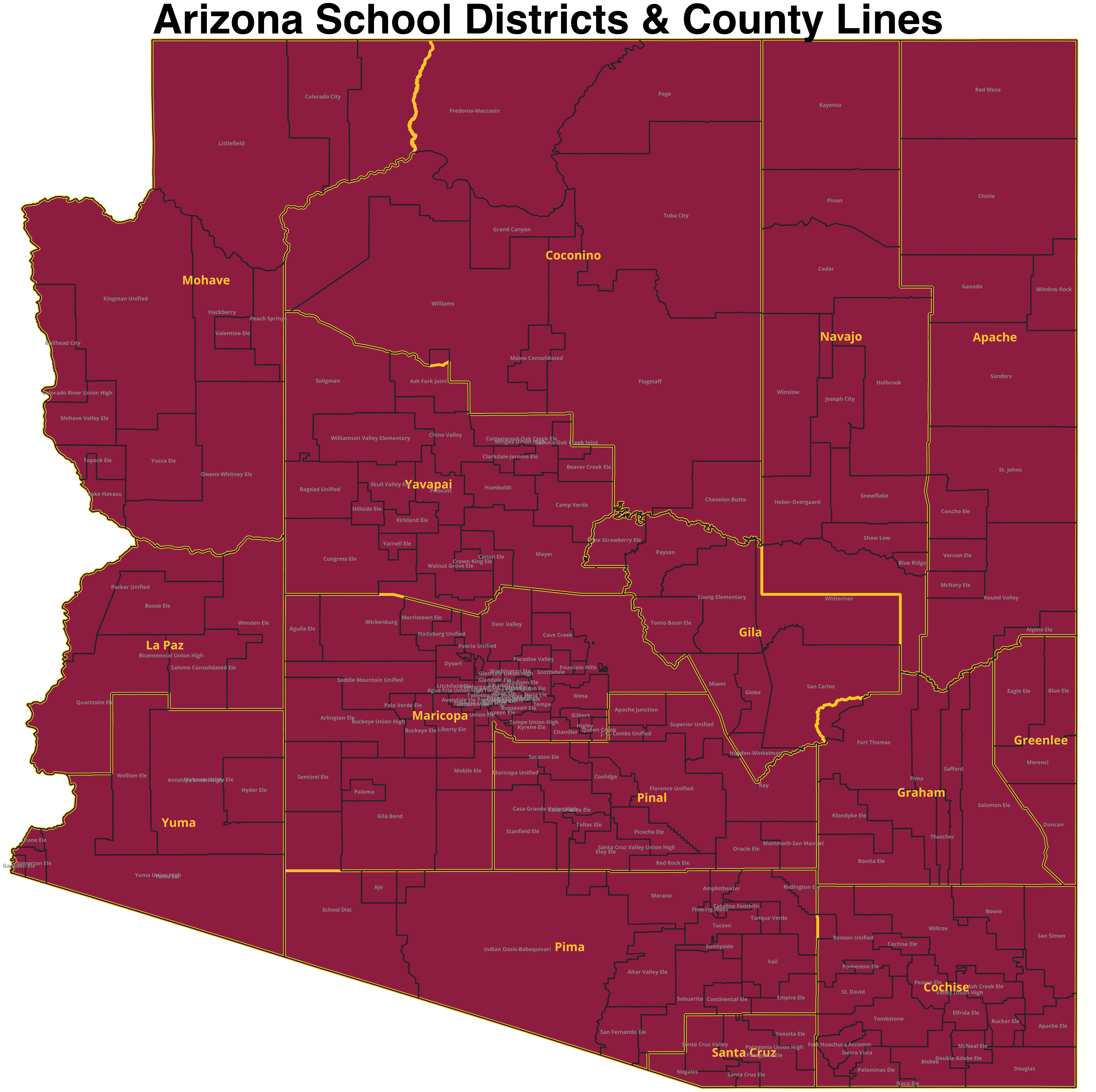
Arizona School Districts

Public schools in Arizona are separated into about 220 local school districts which operate independently, but are governed in most cases by elected county school superintendents; these are in turn overseen by the Arizona State Board of Education and the Arizona Department of Education. A state Superintendent of Public Instruction (elected in partisan elections every even-numbered year when there is not a presidential election, for a four-year term). In 2005, a School District Redistricting Commission was established with the goal of combining and consolidating many of these districts.

=== Higher education ===
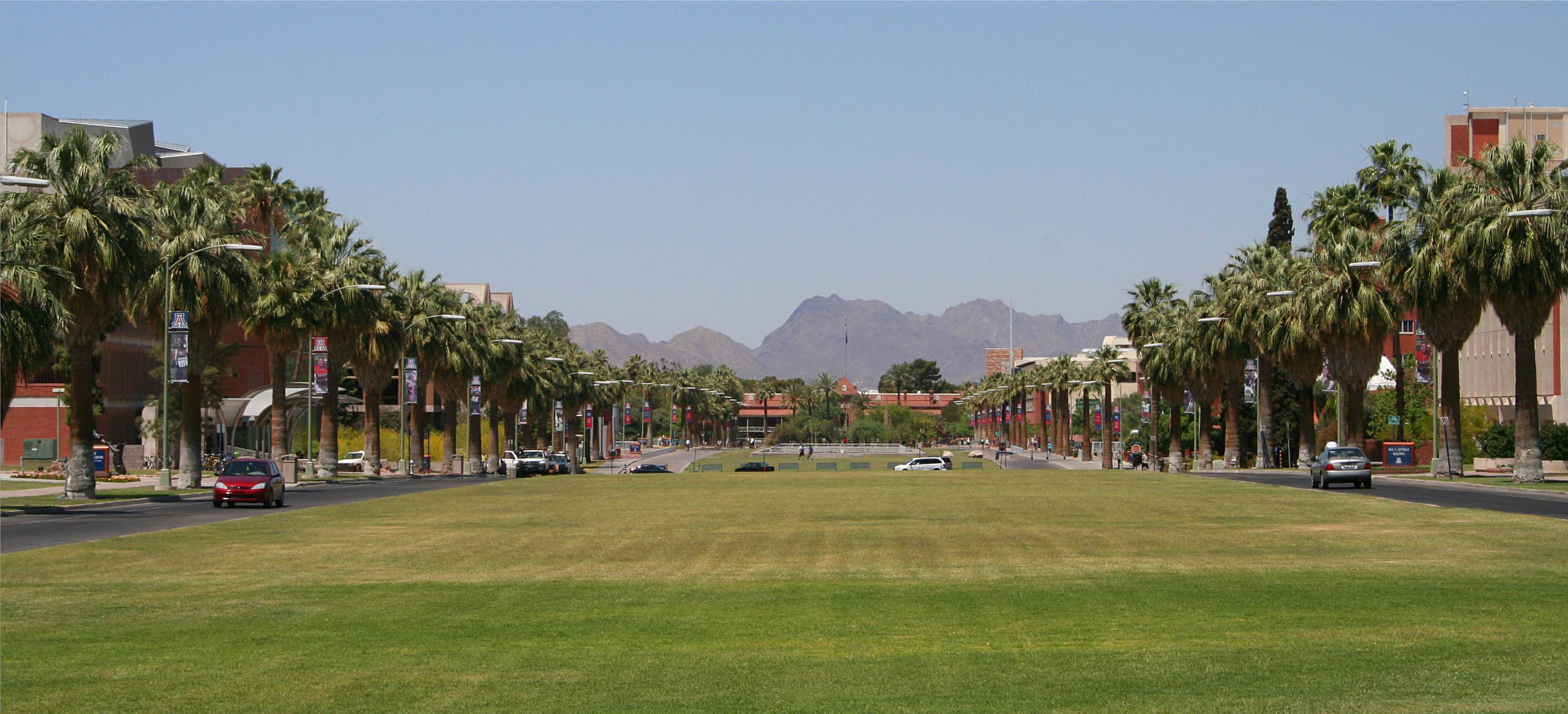
The University of Arizona (the Mall) in Tucson

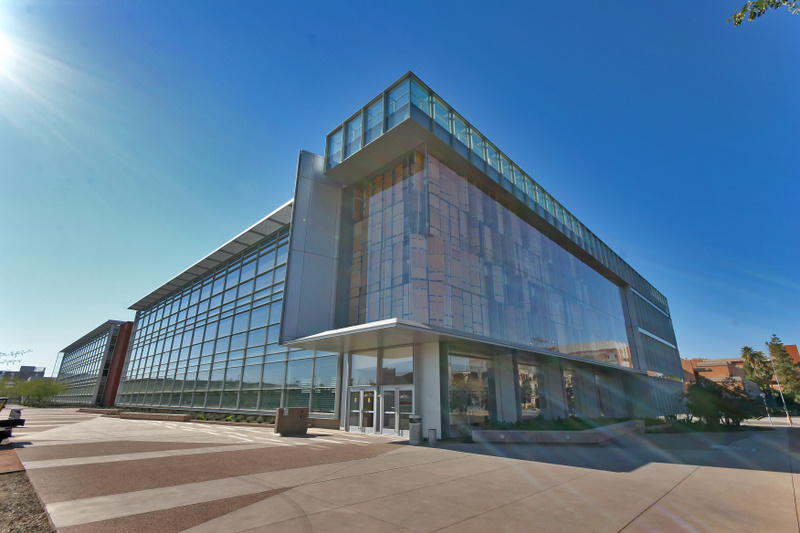
Arizona State University (a biodesign building) in Tempe

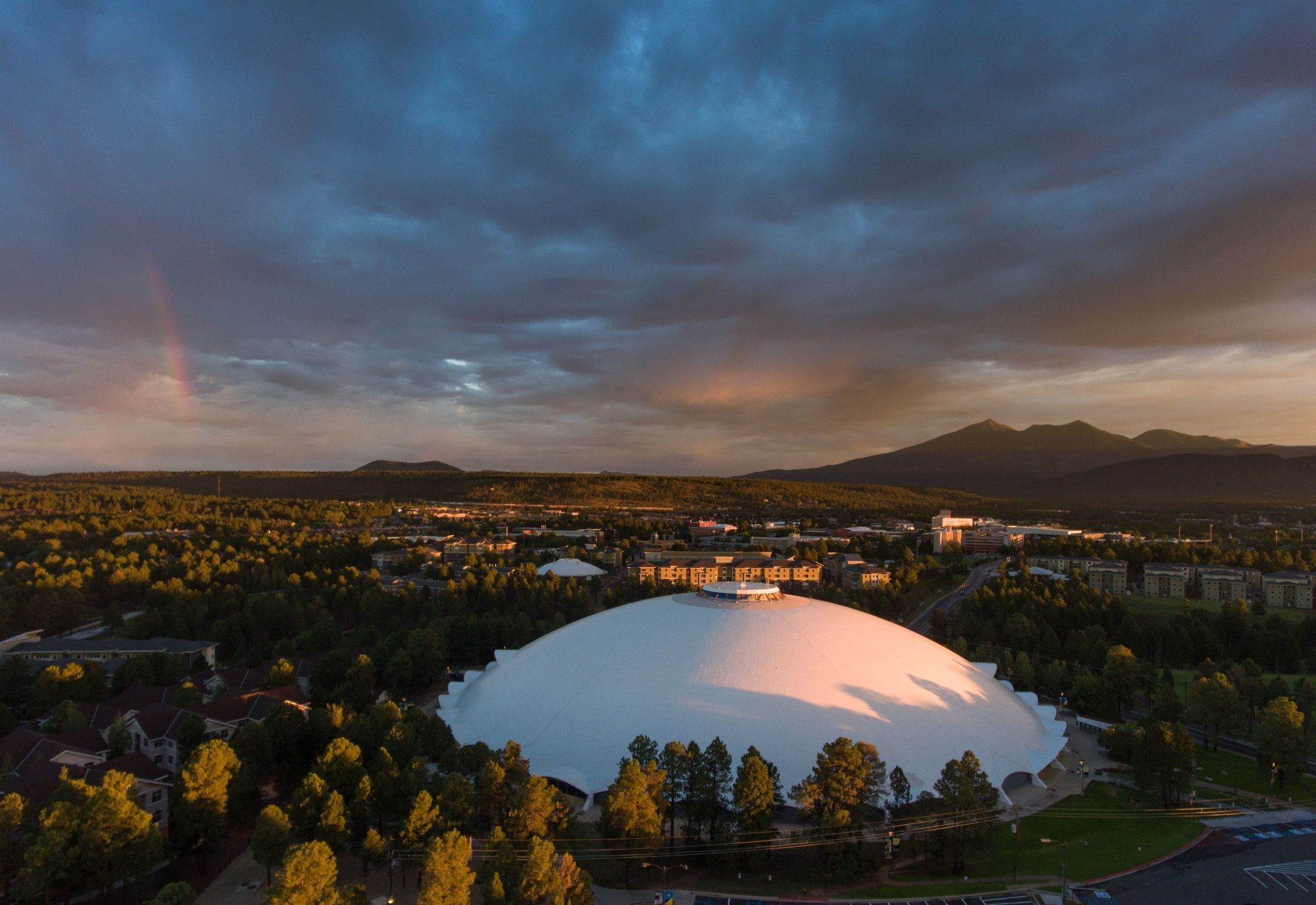
Northern Arizona University (The Skydome) in Flagstaff

Arizona is served by three public universities: The University of Arizona, Arizona State University, and Northern Arizona University. These schools are governed by the Arizona Board of Regents.

Private higher education in Arizona is dominated by a large number of for-profit and "chain" (multi-site) universities.

Embry–Riddle Aeronautical University, Prescott and Prescott College are Arizona's only non-profit four-year private colleges.

Arizona has a wide network of two-year vocational schools and community colleges. These colleges were governed historically by a separate statewide board of directors but, in 2002, the state legislature transferred almost all oversight authority to individual community college districts. The Maricopa County Community College District includes 11 community colleges throughout Maricopa County and is one of the largest in the nation.

==== Public universities in Arizona ====
- Arizona State University, (Sun Devils) Tempe/Phoenix/Mesa/Glendale/Lake Havasu
- Northern Arizona University, (Lumberjacks) Flagstaff/Yuma/Prescott
- University of Arizona, (Wildcats) Tucson/Sierra Vista, MD college in downtown Phoenix and UA Agricultural Center in Yuma/Maricopa

==== Private colleges and universities in Arizona ====
- American Indian College
- Carrington College
- Arizona Christian University
- Art Center College of Design
- Art Institute of Tucson
- Art Institute of Phoenix
- A.T. Still University
- Brookline College
- Brown Mackie College
- Embry-Riddle Aeronautical University
- Grand Canyon University
- Midwestern University
- Northcentral University
- Ottawa University
- Park University
- University of Phoenix
- Penn Foster College
- Prescott College
- Thunderbird School of Global Management
- University of Advancing Technology
- Western International University
- Conservatory of Recording Arts and Sciences

==== Community colleges ====
- Arizona Western College
- Central Arizona College
- Cochise College
- Coconino Community College
- Diné College
- Eastern Arizona College
- Maricopa Community College District:
  - Chandler-Gilbert Community College
  - Estrella Mountain Community College
  - GateWay Community College
  - Glendale Community College
  - Mesa Community College
  - Paradise Valley Community College
  - Phoenix College
  - Rio Salado College
  - Scottsdale Community College
  - South Mountain Community College
- Mohave Community College
- Northland Pioneer College
- Pima Community College
- Yavapai College

== Culture ==
=== Visual arts and museums ===
Phoenix Art Museum, on the historic Central Avenue Corridor in Phoenix, is the Southwest's largest collection of visual art from across the world. The museum displays international exhibitions alongside the museum's collection of more than 18,000 works of American, Asian, European, Latin American, Western American, modern and contemporary art, and fashion design. With a community education mandate since 1951, Phoenix Art Museum holds a year-round program of festivals, live performances, independent art films and educational programs. The museum also has PhxArtKids, an interactive space for children; photography exhibitions through the museum's partnership with the Center for Creative Photography; the landscaped Sculpture Garden and dining at Arcadia Farms.

Arizona is a recognized center of Native American art, with a number of galleries showcasing historical and contemporary works. The Heard Museum, also in Phoenix, is a major repository of Native American art. Some of the signature exhibits include a full Navajo hogan, the Mareen Allen Nichols Collection containing 260 pieces of contemporary jewelry, the Barry Goldwater Collection of 437 historic Hopi kachina dolls, and an exhibit on the 19th-century boarding school experiences of Native Americans. The Heard Museum has about 250,000 visitors a year.

Sedona, Jerome, and Tubac are known as budding artist colonies, and small arts scenes exist in the larger cities and near the state universities.

=== Film ===
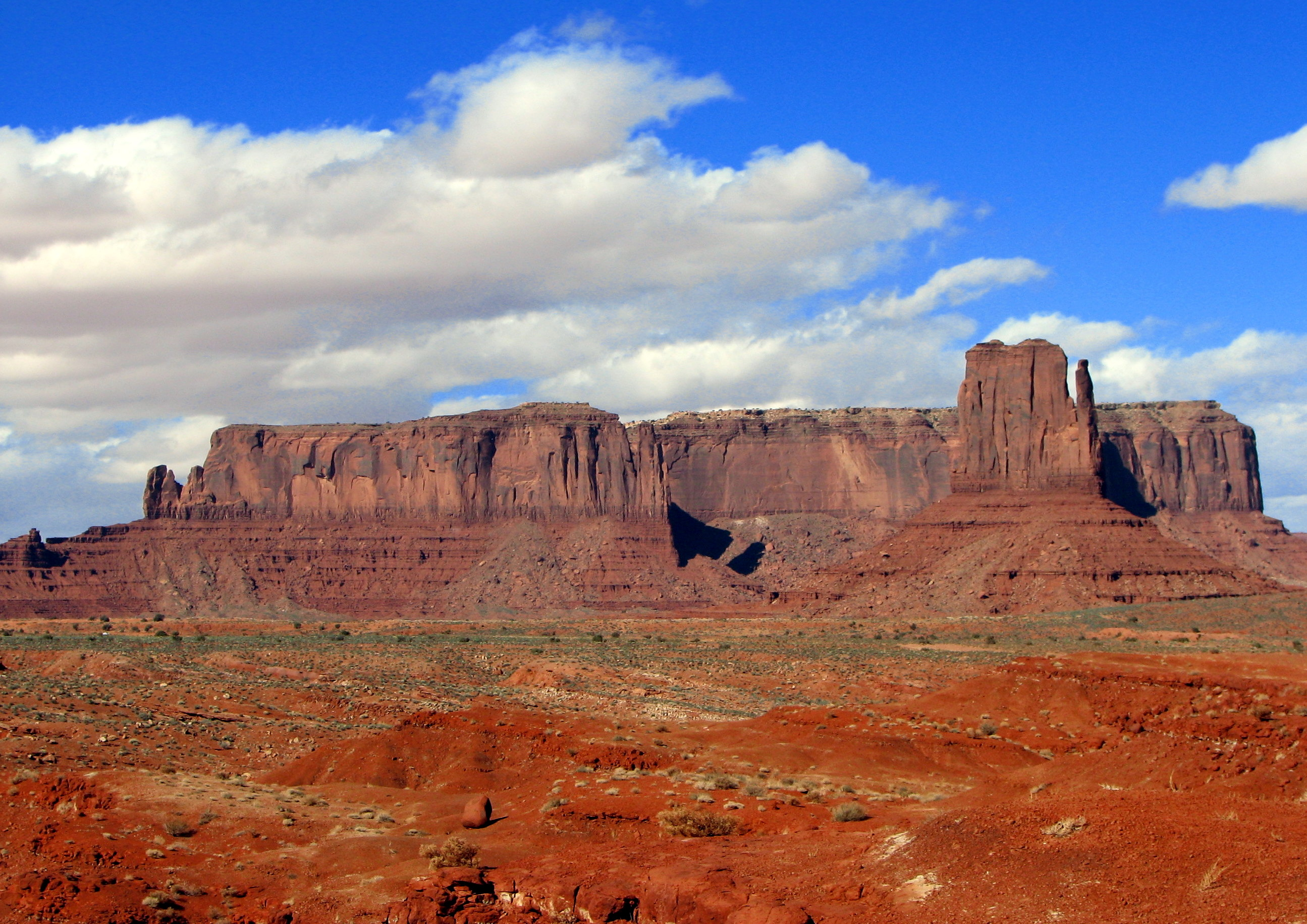
View of Monument Valley from John Ford's Point

Several major Hollywood films, such as Billy Jack, U Turn, Waiting to Exhale, Just One of the Guys, Can't Buy Me Love, Bill & Ted's Excellent Adventure, The Scorpion King, The Banger Sisters, Used Cars, and Raising Arizona have been made there (as have many Westerns). The 1993 science fiction movie Fire in the Sky, based on a reported alien abduction in the town of Snowflake, was set in Snowflake. It was filmed in the Oregon towns of Oakland, Roseburg, and Sutherlin.

The 1974 film Alice Doesn't Live Here Anymore, for which Ellen Burstyn won the Academy Award for Best Actress, and also starring Kris Kristofferson, was set in Tucson. The climax of the 1977 Clint Eastwood film The Gauntlet takes place in downtown Phoenix. The final segments of the 1984 film Starman take place at Meteor Crater outside Winslow. The Jeff Foxworthy comedy documentary movie Blue Collar Comedy Tour was filmed almost entirely at the Dodge Theatre. Some of Alfred Hitchcock's classic film Psycho was shot in Phoenix, the ostensible home town of the main character, Marion Crane.

Some of the television shows filmed or set in Arizona include The New Dick Van Dyke Show, Medium, Alice, The First 48, Insomniac with Dave Attell, Cops, and America's Most Wanted. The TV sitcom Alice, which was based on the movie was set in Phoenix. Twilight had passages set in Phoenix at the beginning and the end of the film.

=== Music ===
Arizona is prominently featured in the lyrics of many Country and Western songs, such as Jamie O'Neal's hit ballad "There Is No Arizona". George Strait's "Oceanfront Property" uses "ocean front property in Arizona" as a metaphor for a sucker proposition. The line "see you down in Arizona Bay" is used in a Tool song in reference to the possibility (expressed as a hope by comedian Bill Hicks) that Southern California will one day fall into the ocean. Glen Campbell, a notable resident, popularized the song "By The Time I Get To Phoenix".

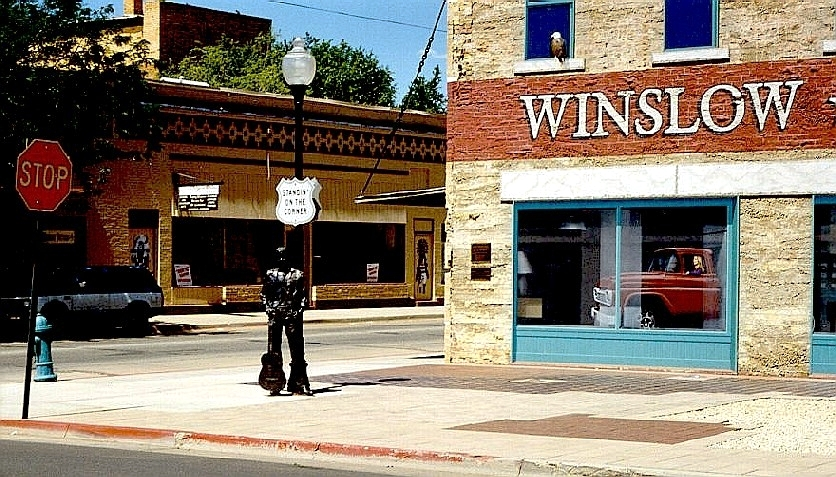
Standin' on the Corner Park and mural in Winslow, Arizona

"Arizona" was the title of a popular song recorded by Mark Lindsay. Arizona is mentioned by the hit song "Take It Easy", written by Jackson Browne and Glenn Frey and performed by the Eagles. Arizona is also mentioned in the Beatles' song "Get Back", credited to John Lennon and Paul McCartney; McCartney sings: "JoJo left his home in Tucson, Arizona, for some California grass." "Carefree Highway", released in 1974 by Gordon Lightfoot, takes its name from Arizona State Route 74 north of Phoenix.

Arizona's music scene is helped by emerging bands, as well as some well-known artists. The Gin Blossoms, Chronic Future, Roger Clyne and the Peacemakers, Jimmy Eat World, Caroline's Spine, and others began their careers in Arizona. Also, a number of punk and rock bands got their start in Arizona, including JFA, The Feederz, Sun City Girls, The Meat Puppets, The Maine, The Summer Set, and more recently Authority Zero and Digital Summer.

Arizona also has many singers and other musicians. Singer, songwriter and guitarist Michelle Branch is from Sedona. Chester Bennington, the former lead vocalist of Linkin Park, and mash-up artist DJ Z-Trip are both from Phoenix. One of Arizona's better known musicians is shock rocker Alice Cooper, who helped define the genre. Maynard James Keenan, the lead singer of the bands Tool, A Perfect Circle, and Puscifer, calls the town of Cornville home.

Other notable singers include country singers Dierks Bentley and Marty Robbins, folk singer Katie Lee, Fleetwood Mac's Stevie Nicks, CeCe Peniston, Rex Allen, 2007 American Idol winner Jordin Sparks, and Linda Ronstadt.

Arizona is also known for its heavy metal scene, which is centered in and around Phoenix. In the early to mid-1990s, it included bands such as Job for a Cowboy, Knights of the Abyss, Greeley Estates, Eyes Set To Kill, blessthefall, The Word Alive, The Dead Rabbitts, and Abigail Williams. The bands Soulfly and Gatecreeper calls Phoenix home, and Megadeth lived in Phoenix for about a decade. Around 2009, Phoenix began to host a burgeoning desert rock and sludge metal underground, (ala' Kyuss in 1990s California) led by bands like Wolves of Winter, Asimov, and Dead Canyon.

American composer Elliott Carter composed his first String Quartet (1950–51) while on sabbatical (from New York) in Arizona. The quartet won a Pulitzer Prize and other awards and is now a staple of the string quartet repertoire.

== Sports ==
Club	Sport	League	Championships
Arizona Cardinals	American football	National Football League	2 (1925, 1947)
Arizona Diamondbacks	Baseball	Major League Baseball	1 (2001)
Tucson Saguaros	Baseball	Pecos League	3 (2016, 2020, 2021)
Phoenix Suns	Basketball	National Basketball Association	0
Phoenix Mercury	Basketball	Women's National Basketball Association	3 (2007, 2009, 2014)
Phoenix Rising FC	Soccer	USL Championship	1 (2023)
FC Tucson	Soccer	USL League Two	0
Tucson Roadrunners	Ice hockey	American Hockey League	0
Arizona Rattlers	Indoor football	Indoor Football League	7 (1994, 1997, 2012, 2013, 2014)

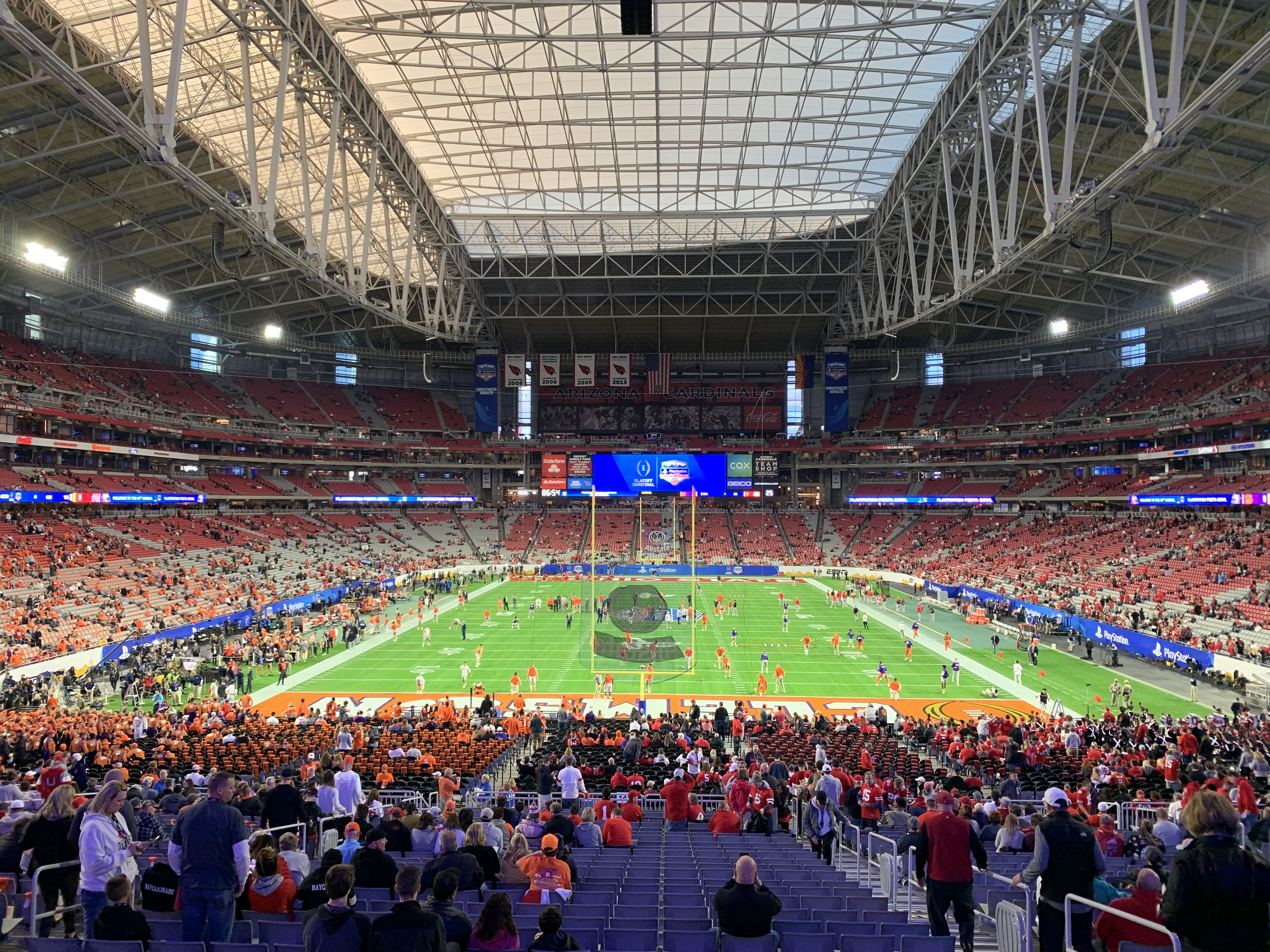
State Farm Stadium in Glendale

Four Super Bowls have been held in Arizona, including Super Bowl LVII which was held at State Farm Stadium on February 12, 2023.

Due to its numerous golf courses, Arizona is home to several stops on the PGA Tour, most notably the Phoenix Open, held at the TPC of Scottsdale, and the WGC-Accenture Match Play Championship at the Ritz-Carlton Golf Club in Marana.

Auto racing is another sport known in the state. Phoenix Raceway in Avondale is home to NASCAR race weekends twice a year. Firebird International Raceway near Chandler is home to drag racing and other motorsport events.

=== College sports ===
College sports are also prevalent in Arizona. The Arizona State Sun Devils and the Arizona Wildcats belong to the Big-12 Conference while the Northern Arizona Lumberjacks compete in the Big Sky Conference and the Grand Canyon Antelopes compete in the Mountain West Conference. The rivalry between Arizona State Sun Devils and the Arizona Wildcats predates Arizona's statehood, and is the oldest rivalry in the NCAA. The Territorial Cup, first awarded in 1889 and certified as the oldest trophy in college football, is awarded to the winner of the annual football game between the two schools.

Arizona also hosts several college football bowl games. The Fiesta Bowl, originally held at Sun Devil Stadium, is now held at State Farm Stadium in Glendale. The Fiesta Bowl is part of the new College Football Playoff (CFP). University of Phoenix Stadium was also home to the 2007 and 2011 BCS National Championship Games.

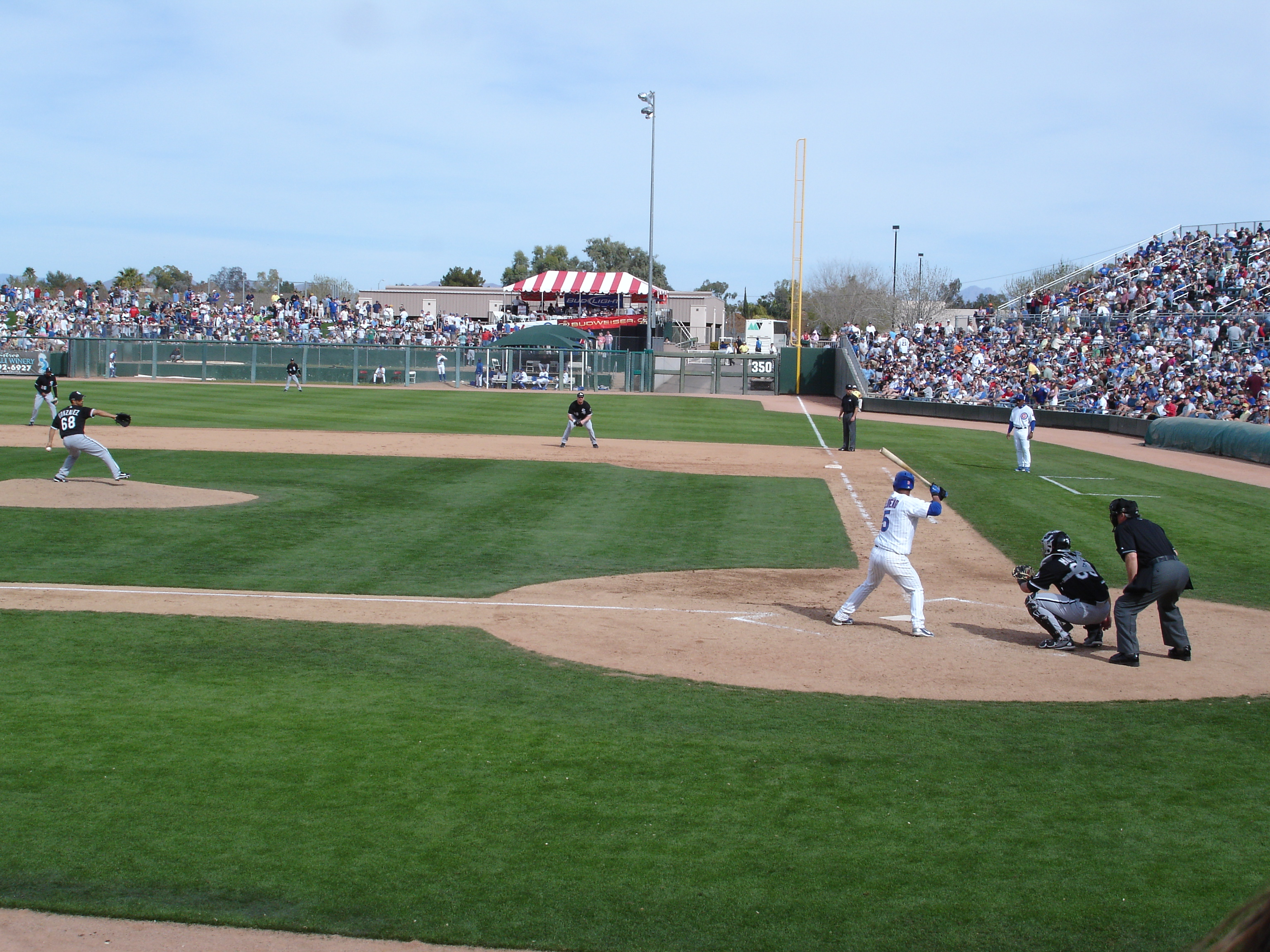
A spring training game between the Cubs and White Sox at HoHoKam Park

State Farm Stadium hosted the Final Four of the NCAA Division I men's basketball tournament in 2017 and is scheduled to host it again in 2024.

=== Baseball ===
Arizona is a popular location for Major League Baseball spring training, as it is home to the Cactus League. Spring training was first started in Arizona in 1947, when Brewers owner Veeck sold them in 1945 but went on to purchase the Cleveland Indians in 1946. He decided to train the Cleveland Indians in Tucson and convinced the New York Giants to give Phoenix a try. Thus, the Cactus League was born.

On March 9, 1995, Arizona was awarded a franchise to begin to play for the 1998 season. A $130 million franchise fee was paid to Major League Baseball and on January 16, 1997, the Diamondbacks were officially voted into the National League.

Since their debut, the Diamondbacks have won five National League West titles, two National League Championship pennants, and most recently the 2001 World Series.

== See also ==
- Outline of Arizona
- Index of Arizona-related articles
- USS Arizona, 4 ships

== Notes ==
Preceded by New Mexico	List of U.S. states by date of admission to the Union; Admitted on February 14, 1912 (48th)	Succeeded by Alaska
