= List of deaths through alcohol =

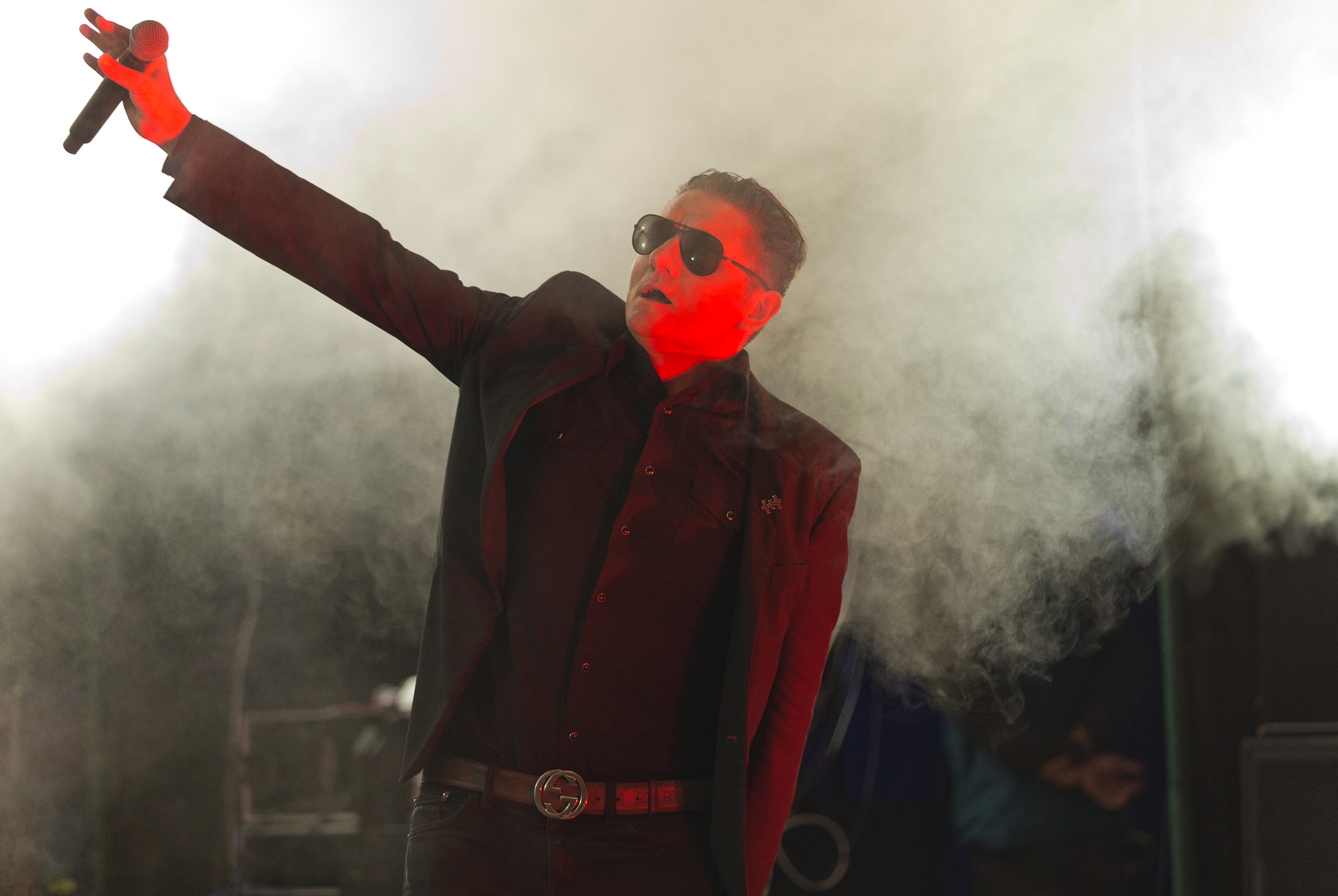
The latest entry on the list below marks the death of Douglas McCarthy

This article lists notable people in alcohol-related deaths who died of short- or long-term effects of alcohol consumption. Deaths caused indirectly by alcohol, or driving under the influence, are not listed here.

The Journal of the American Medical Association defines alcoholism, or alcohol use disorder, as "a primary, chronic disease characterized by impaired control over drinking, preoccupation with the drug alcohol, use of alcohol despite adverse consequences, and distortions in thinking, most notably denial." The majority of people in this list died from causes related to alcoholism.

== Deaths ==
| Name | Death date & age | Location | Cause | Occupation |
|---|---|---|---|---|
| Douglas McCarthy | 11 June 2025 (aged 58) | London, England, United Kingdom | Alochol-related cirrhosis | Singer |
| Tyler Christopher | 31 October 2023 (aged 50) | San Diego, California, United States | Acute alcohol intoxication | Actor |
| Steve Harwell | 4 September 2023 (aged 56) | Boise, Idaho, United States | Liver failure | Musician, singer |
| Adam Zimmer | 31 October 2022 (aged 38) | Mendota Heights, Minnesota, United States | Complications of chronic ethanol use disorder | Professional football coach |
| Allister Adel | 30 April 2022 (aged 45) | Phoenix, Arizona, United States | Alcohol-related issues | County Attorney for Maricopa County, 2019 to 2022 |
| Vincent Jackson | 15 February 2021 (aged 38) | Brandon, Florida, United States | Chronic alcohol use | National Football League player |
| Alexi Laiho | 29 December 2020 (aged 41) | Helsinki, Finland | Alcohol-related cirrhosis and pancreatitis | Professional Musician, heavy metal vocalist |
| Bonnie Pointer | 8 June 2020 (aged 69) | Los Angeles, California | Cardiac arrest due to alcoholic liver disease and cirrhosis | Musician |
| Cady Groves | 2 May 2020 (aged 30) | Nashville, Tennessee, United States | Chronic alcohol abuse | Professional singer-songwriter |
| Patricia Minaldi | 1 December 2018 (aged 60) | Lake Charles, Louisiana, United States | Alcohol-related issues | United States district judge |
| Verne Troyer | 21 April 2018 (aged 49) | Los Angeles, United States | Suicide by alcohol intoxication | Actor and comedian |
| Dolores O'Riordan | 15 January 2018 (aged 46) | London, England | Drowning due to alcohol intoxication | Singer |
| David Cassidy | 21 November 2017 (aged 67) | Fort Lauderdale, Florida, United States | Kidney and liver failure due to alcohol abuse. Was in a medically induced coma awaiting liver transplant | Singer, musician and actor |
| Charles Kennedy | 1 June 2015 (aged 55) | Fort William, Scotland | Major haemorrhage linked to alcoholism | Liberal Democrat politician |
| Jack Bruce | 25 October 2014 (aged 71) | Sudbury, England | Liver disease | Musician |
| Elizabeth Peña | 14 October 2014 (aged 55) | Los Angeles, California, U.S. | Cirrhosis of the liver due to alcohol. This caused acute gastrointestinal bleeding, cardiogenic shock and cardiac arrest. | Actress |
| Jason Molina | 16 May 2013 (aged 39) | Indianapolis, United States | Organ failure related to alcohol abuse | Musician |
| Jeff Hanneman | 2 May 2013 (aged 49) | Inland Empire, California, United States | Alcohol-related liver cirrhosis | Musician |
| Jani Lane | 11 August 2011 (aged 47) | Los Angeles, California, United States | Acute alcohol poisoning | Musician |
| Amy Winehouse | 23 July 2011 (aged 27) | London, England | Alcohol intoxication | Singer/songwriter |
| Gary Moore | 6 February 2011 (aged 58) | Estepona, Spain | Heart attack | Musician |
| Gerry Rafferty | 4 January 2011 (aged 63) | Stroud, Gloucestershire, England | Liver failure | Musician |
| George Best | 25 November 2005 (aged 59) | London, England | Alcoholism and complications following a liver transplant | Football player |
| Michael Elphick | 7 September 2002 (aged 55) | London, England | Alcoholism | Actor |
| John Nathan-Turner | 1 May 2002 (aged 54) | Brighton, United Kingdom | Liver failure | Television producer |
| Phil Katz | 14 April 2000 (aged 37) | Milwaukee, United States | Acute pancreatic bleeding caused by chronic alcoholism | Computer programmer |
| Oliver Reed | 2 May 1999 (aged 61) | Malta | Heart attack | Actor |
| Derek Newark | 11 August 1998 (aged 65) | London, England | Heart attack, brought on by liver failure after years of alcoholism | Actor |
| Kevin Lloyd | 2 May 1998 (aged 49) | Staffordshire, England | Alcohol-related incident | Actor |
| Arkady Shevchenko | 28 February 1998 (aged 67) | Washington, District of Columbia | Cirrhosis | Diplomat |
| Brian Connolly | 10 February 1997 (aged 51) | Slough, United Kingdom | Renal failure | Singer |
| Townes Van Zandt | 1 January 1997 (aged 52) | Smyrna, Tennessee, United States | Heart attack | Musician |
| John Panozzo | 16 July 1996 (aged 47) | Chicago, Illinois | Gastrointestinal hemorrhaging and cirrhosis | Musician |
| Mickey Mantle | 13 August 1995 (aged 63) | Dallas, Texas | Liver cancer | New York Yankees center fielder |
| Nicholas Fairbairn | 19 February 1995 (aged 61) | Dunfermline, Scotland | Liver disease | Politician and advocate |
| Gerald Durrell | 30 January 1995 (aged 70) | Saint Helier, Jersey | Complications following a liver transplant | Naturalist, writer, television presenter |
| Peter Cook | 9 January 1995 (aged 57) | London, England | Gastrointestinal haemorrhage | Comedian |
| George Spenton-Foster | 26 December 1993 (aged 67) | London, England | Alcoholism | Television director |
| Michael Clarke | 19 December 1993 (aged 47) | San Francisco, California | Alcohol-related liver failure | Musician |
| André the Giant | 28 January 1993 (aged 46) | Paris, France | Heart Attack | Wrestler |
| Kenny Howard | 19 September 1992 (aged 63) | Ventura, California | Alcohol-related complications | Artist, automobile customizer, mechanic |
| Keith Whitley | 9 May 1989 (aged 34) | Goodlettsville, Tennessee | Alcoholism | Country music singer |
| John Cassavetes | 3 February 1989 (aged 59) | Los Angeles, United States | Alcohol-related cirrhosis | Film director |
| Chögyam Trungpa | 4 April 1987 (aged 48) | Halifax, Nova Scotia | Alcoholism, alcohol-related liver cirrhosis, cardiac arrest | Buddhist meditation master |
| George Brown | 2 June 1985 (aged 70) | Truro, Cornwall, England | Cirrhosis, stroke | Politician |
| Ian Hendry | 24 December 1984 (aged 53) | London, England | Stomach haemorrhage | Actor |
| Truman Capote | 25 August 1984 (aged 59) | Los Angeles, United States | Liver disease | Writer |
| Richard Burton | 5 August 1984 (aged 58) | Geneva, Switzerland | Cerebral haemorrhage | Actor |
| John Dearth | 17 March 1984 (aged 63) | London, England | Alcoholism | Actor |
| José Carlos Ary dos Santos | 18 January 1984 (aged 47) | Lisbon, Portugal | Alcohol-related liver cirrhosis | Poet |
| Garrincha | 20 January 1983 (aged 49) | Rio de Janeiro, Brazil | Alcoholism | Footballer |
| Fred Trump Jr. | 26 September 1981 (aged 42) | Queens, New York | Heart Attack | Pilot, brother of U.S. President Donald Trump |
| John Bonham | 25 September 1980 (aged 32) | Windsor, United Kingdom | Asphyxiation | Drummer for Led Zeppelin, musician |
| Yootha Joyce | 24 August 1980 (aged 53) | London, England | Alcoholism | Actress |
| Vladimir Vysotsky | 25 July 1980 (aged 42) | Moscow, Soviet Union | Heart attack | Singer, songwriter, poet, and actor |
| Bon Scott | 19 February 1980 (aged 33) | London, England | Acute alcohol intoxication | Lead singer and songwriter for hard rock band AC/DC |
| John A. Powers | 31 December 1979 (aged 57) | Phoenix, Arizona | Gastrointestinal hemorrhage due to chronic alcoholism | NASA Public Affairs Officer |
| Reginald Maudling | 14 February 1979 (aged 61) | Royal Free Hospital, Hampstead, London, England | Alcohol-related liver cirrhosis, Kidney failure | United Kingdom Chancellor of the Exchequer |
| Ed Wood | 10 December 1978 (aged 54) | Los Angeles, United States | Cardiac arrest | Film director |
| Kenneth O'Donnell | 9 September 1977 (aged 53) | Boston, Massachusetts | Gastrointestinal ailment due to alcoholism | White House Appointments Secretary, political consultant |
| Madan Mohan | 14 July 1975 (aged 51) | Mumbai, India | Alcohol-related liver cirrhosis | Composer |
| Dave Alexander | 10 February 1975 (aged 27) | Ann Arbor, Michigan | Alcohol-related pancreatitis and pulmonary edema | Musician |
| Veronica Lake | 7 July 1973 (aged 50) | Burlington, Vermont, United States | Acute hepatitis | Actress |
| Ron "Pigpen" McKernan | 8 March 1973 (aged 27) | Corte Madera, California, United States | Gastrointestinal haemorrhage | Musician |
| Geeta Dutt | 20 July 1972 (aged 41) | Mumbai, India | Alcohol-related liver cirrhosis | Singer |
| Clyde McPhatter | 13 June 1972 (aged 39) | The Bronx, New York, United States | Heart attack | R&B singer |
| Meena Kumari | 31 March 1972 (aged 38) | Mumbai, India | Alcohol-related liver cirrhosis | Actress, poet, singer, costume designer |
| Jaikishan Dayabhai Panchal | 12 September 1971 (aged 41) | Mumbai, India | Alcohol-related liver cirrhosis | Composer |
| A. A. Allen | 11 June 1970 (aged 59) | San Francisco, United States | Binge drinking | Evangelist |
| Jack Kerouac | 21 October 1969 (aged 47) | St. Petersburg, Florida, United States | Alcoholism | Writer |
| Barbara Payton | 8 May 1967 (aged 39) | San Diego, United States | Liver failure | Actress |
| Shailendra | 14 December 1966 (aged 43) | Mumbai, India | Alcohol-related liver cirrhosis | Lyricist |
| Brendan Behan | 20 March 1964 (aged 41) | Dublin, Ireland | Jaundice and diabetes | Poet |
| Perry Miller | 9 December 1963 (aged 58) | Cambridge, Massachusetts | Alcohol-related pancreatitis | Historian |
| Gail Russell | 26 August 1961 (aged 36) | Los Angeles, California | Liver damage, aspiration of vomit | Actress |
| Errol Flynn | 14 October 1959 (aged 50) | Vancouver, Canada | Heart attack | Actor |
| Billie Holiday | 17 July 1959 (aged 44) | New York City, United States | Cirrhosis | Singer |
| Raymond Chandler | 26 March 1959 (aged 70) | San Diego, United States | Pneumonia | Writer |
| Lester Young | 15 March 1959 (aged 49) | New York City, United States | Heart failure | Musician |
| Joseph McCarthy | 2 May 1957 (aged 48) | Bethesda, Maryland, United States | Acute hepatitis | Republican U.S. Senator |
| Ira Hayes | 24 January 1955 (aged 32) | Bapchule, Arizona, United States | Alcohol intoxication, hypothermia | War hero |
| Dylan Thomas | 9 November 1953 (aged 39) | New York City, United States | Alcoholism | Writer |
| Hank Williams | 1 January 1953 (aged 29) | Oak Hill, West Virginia, United States | Acute ventricular dilation | Musician |
| Sinclair Lewis | 10 January 1951 (aged 65) | Rome, Italy | alcoholism | Novelist, playwright, short story writer |
| Hack Wilson | 23 November 1948 (aged 48) | Baltimore, Maryland | Complications from a fall in his home | Major League Baseball player |
| W. C. Fields | 25 December 1946 (aged 66) | Pasadena, California, United States | Alcoholism | Actor |
| Lorenz Hart | 22 November 1943 (aged 48) | New York City, United States | Alcoholism | Lyricist |
| John Barrymore | 29 May 1942 (aged 60) | Los Angeles, California, United States | Alcohol-related liver cirrhosis | Actor |
| Helen Morgan | 9 October 1941 (aged 41) | Chicago, Illinois, United States | Alcohol-related liver cirrhosis | Singer, actress |
| F. Scott Fitzgerald | 21 December 1940 (aged 44) | Hollywood, California, United States | Heart attack | Writer |
| Horace Trumbauer | 18 September 1938 (aged 69) | Philadelphia, Pennsylvania, United States | Cirrhosis | Architect |
| Marie Prevost | 21 January 1937 (aged 40) | Los Angeles, California, United States | Acute alcoholism, malnutrition as a result of anorexia nervosa | Actress |
| Fernando Pessoa | 30 November 1935 (aged 47) | Lisbon, Portugal | Alcohol-related liver cirrhosis or alcohol-related pancreatitis | Poet, writer, literary critic, translator, publisher and philosopher |
| Bix Beiderbecke | 6 August 1931 (aged 28) | Queens, New York, United States | Pneumonia | Musician |
| O. Henry | 5 June 1910 (aged 47) | New York City, United States | Alcohol-related liver cirrhosis | Writer |
| Henri de Toulouse-Lautrec | 9 September 1901 (aged 36) | Saint-André-du-Bois, France | Alcoholism | Painter, printmaker, draughtsman, caricaturist, and illustrator |
| Pōmare V | 12 June 1891 (aged 51) | Royal Palace, Papeʻete, Tahiti | Alcoholism | The last monarch of Tahiti |
| Modest Mussorgsky | 28 March 1881 (aged 42) | Saint Petersburg, Russia | Alcoholism, delirium tremens, epileptic seizure | Composer |
| Franklin Pierce | 8 October 1869 (aged 64) | Concord, New Hampshire, United States | Edema or alcohol-related liver cirrhosis (death certification) | U.S. President |
| Ardashir Mirza | 1866 (aged 58–59) | Tehran, Iran | Alcohol-related issues | Prince, and governor |
| Daniel Webster | 24 October 1852 (aged 70) | Marshfield, Massachusetts, U.S. | Alcohol-related liver cirrhosis | United States Secretary of State |
| Ranjit Singh | 27 June 1839 (aged 58) | Lahore, Sikh Empire (present-day Punjab, Pakistan) | Alcoholism, liver failure, stroke | 1st Maharaja of the Sikh Empire |
| Pōmare II | 7 December 1821 (aged 38–39) | Motu Uta, Papeete, Tahiti | Alcohol-related issues | The second king of Tahiti between 1782 and 1821 |
| Murad IV | 8 February 1640 (aged 27) | Ottoman Empire | Cirrhosis due to Alcoholism | Sultan of Ottoman Empire between 1623 and 1640 |
| Ögedei Khan | 11 December 1241 (aged 54–55) | Mongolia | Alcoholism | The second Great Khan of Mongol Empire between 1227 and 1241 |
| Béla II of Hungary | 13 February 1141 (aged 31–32) | Hungary | Alcohol-related issues | King of Hungary and Croatia from 1131 |
| Gao Yang | 25 November 559 (aged 32–33) | Northern Qi, China | Long-term effects of alcohol | 1st emperor of the Northern Qi |

== See also ==
- Gilbert Paul Jordan (aka The Boozing Barber)
- List of deaths from drug overdose and intoxication
- List of hazing deaths in the United States
- Lists of people by cause of death
