= Michael Strank =

United States Marine Corps sergeant (1919–1945)

- Михал Стренк
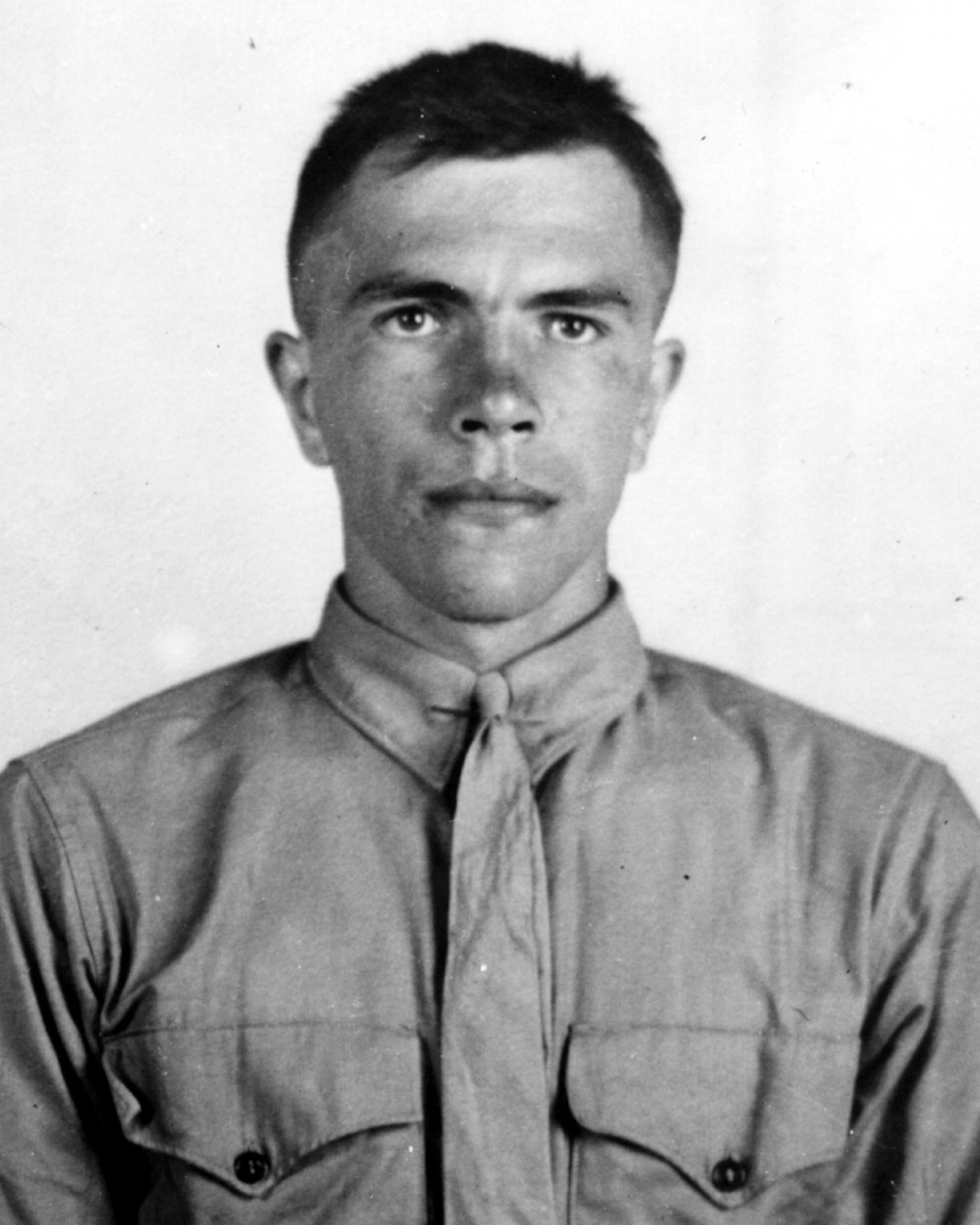
- Michael Strank, U.S. Marine Corps in 1939
- Born: Mykhal Strenk; November 10, 1919; Jarabina, Czechoslovakia (present-day Slovakia)
- Died: March 1, 1945 (aged 25); Iwo Jima, Bonin Islands, Japanese Empire †
- Burial place: Arlington National Cemetery
- Military career
- Allegiance: United States
- Branch: United States Marine Corps
- Service years: 1939–1945
- Rank: Sergeant
- Units: 2nd Battalion, 28th Marines, 5th Marine Division
- Conflicts: World War II; Pavuvu; Battle of Bougainville; Solomon Islands campaign; Battle of Iwo Jima †
- Awards: Bronze Star (1+1"V"); Purple Heart; Combat Action Ribbon

Michael Strank (born Mykhal Strenk; (Note: Rusyn: Михал Стренк, romanized: Mykhal Strenk, anglicized: Michael Strank) November 10, 1919 – March 1, 1945) was a United States Marine Corps sergeant who was killed in action during the Battle of Iwo Jima in World War II. He was one of the Marines who raised the second U.S. flag on Mount Suribachi on February 23, 1945, as shown in the iconic photograph Raising the Flag on Iwo Jima by photographer Joe Rosenthal. Of the six Marines depicted in the photo, Strank and Ira Hayes were the only ones to be correctly identified from the beginning; the others were either assigned the wrong locations (Franklin Sousley), or were given the names of Marines who were not in the photo.

The first flag raised over Mount Suribachi at the south end of Iwo Jima was deemed too small. Later that day, Strank, a rifle company squad leader in the 5th Marine Division, was ordered up the mountain with three Marines to raise a larger flag. The photograph of the second flag-raising became famous and was widely reproduced. The second flag raising was also filmed in color. Before Iwo Jima, Strank served with the Marine Raiders in the Battle of Bougainville.

The Marine Corps War Memorial in Arlington, Virginia, was modeled after Rosenthal's photograph of six Marines raising the second flag on Iwo Jima.

== Early life ==
Michael Strank was born in a Rusyn family in the Prešov village of Orjabyna in Czechoslovakia (present-day Jarabina in the Stará Ľubovňa district), Prešov Region of northeastern Czechoslovakia (now in Slovakia). His two brothers, Petro and John, and his sister Mary were born in the United States to Vasil Strenk (later, in the U.S., known as Charles Strank) and Marta Grófiková, Rusyn immigrants. In his application for American citizenship, Vasil Strenk's father indicated the nationality of his family as Ruthenian. Vasil Strank moved to Franklin Borough (near Johnstown, Pennsylvania, United States), found work in the coal mines for the Bethlehem Steel Corporation, and brought his family to Pennsylvania three years later, when he could pay for their voyage. Strank attended the public schools of Franklin Borough and graduated from Franklin Borough High School in 1937. He joined the Civilian Conservation Corps, served for 18 months, and afterwards became a Pennsylvania state highway laborer.

== U.S. Marine Corps ==
Strank enlisted in the Marine Corps at Pittsburgh for four years service on October 6, 1939. He was assigned to the Marine Corps Recruit Depot Parris Island in South Carolina. He completed recruit training in December and was transferred to Headquarters Company, Post Troop and then to Provisional Company W at Parris Island, on January 17, 1941. Private First Class Strank sailed for Guantánamo Bay, Cuba, arriving on January 23, 1941. He was reassigned to Headquarters Company, 3rd Battalion, 7th Marine Regiment, 1st Marine Brigade (on February 1, the 1st Marine Brigade was redesignated the 1st Marine Division). On April 8, now assigned to Company K, 3rd Battalion, 7th Marines, he returned to the United States and was sent back to Marine Corps Recruit Depot Parris Island. He was promoted to corporal on April 23, 1941. In September, Cpl. Strank moved with the 1st Marine Division to New River (North Carolina) (Camp Lejeune), which is where he was stationed when the attack on Pearl Harbor occurred.

=== World War II ===
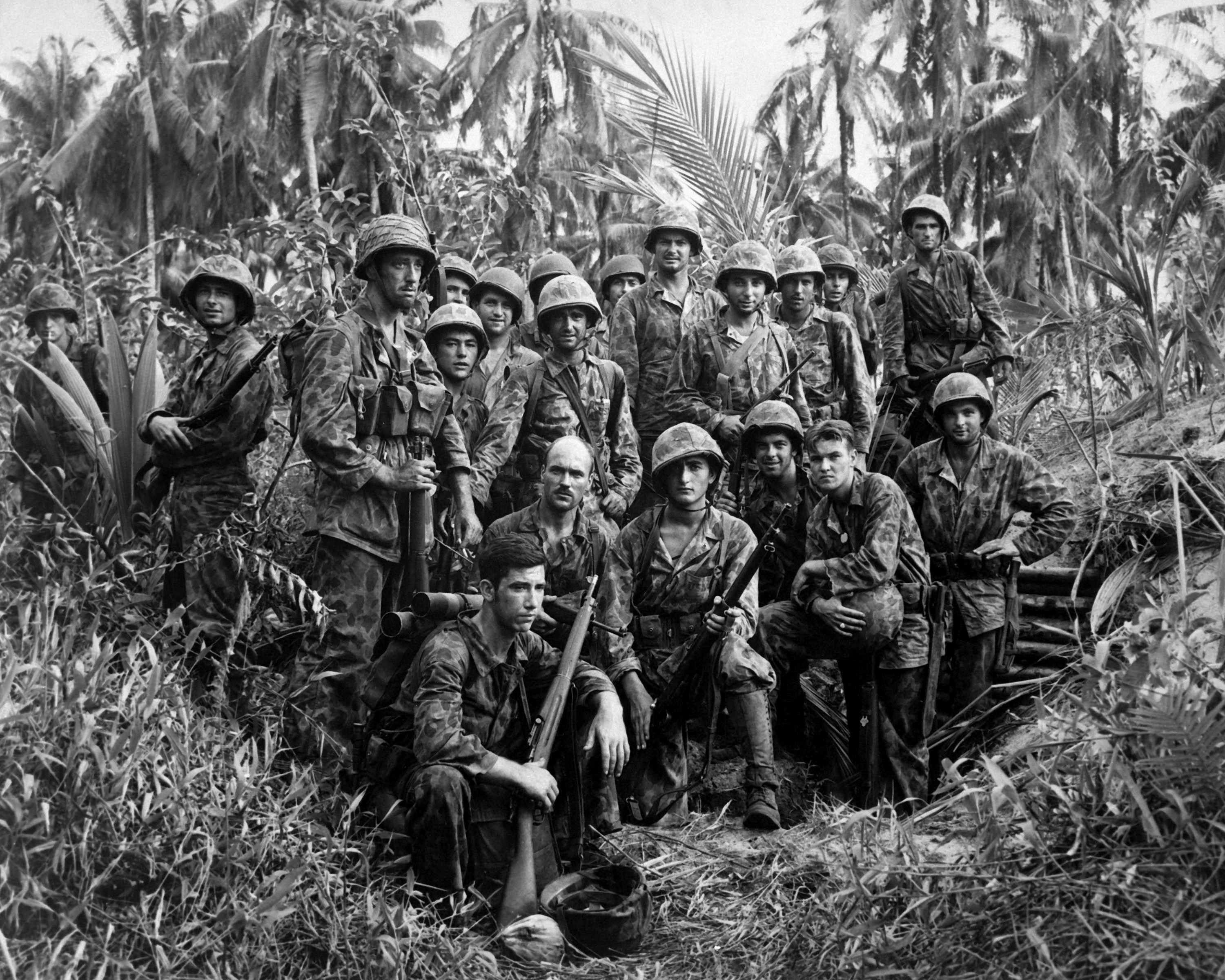
Members of the 3rd Marine Raiders in front of a captured Japanese dugout on Cape Torokina at Bougainville.

On January 26, 1942, Cpl. Strank was promoted to sergeant. On March 21, the 3rd Battalion, 7th Marines was detached from the 1st Marine Division and attached to the newly created 3rd Marine Brigade. In early April, he was sent with the battalion to San Diego, California and deployed on April 12 (sailed April 13) to Samoa arriving in American Samoa on April 28; the 7th Marines were ordered to Samoa. On May 31, his battalion was transferred to Wallis (Urea) Island. In August, the 3rd Battalion, 7th Marines was detached from the 3rd Marine Brigade and reassigned to the 1st Marine Division; also during August, the 22nd Marine Regiment relieved the 7th Marines which were ordered to reinforce Marine units fighting on Guadalcanal; a battalion of the 22nd Marines relieved the 3rd Battalion, 7th Marines on Urea. In September, after a short time with the 22nd Marines, Sgt. Strank was transferred to the newly organized 3rd Marine Raider Battalion under the command of Lieutenant Colonel Harry B. Liversedge; D Company, 3rd Raider Battalion was organized on Urea and joined the rest of the 3rd Raider Battalion at Pago Pago, American Samoa on December 21. In January and February 1943, the 3rd Raiders were sent to Espiritu Santo (Camp Rennie), New Hebrides, Islands and Guadalcanal, British Solomon Islands.

As a member of the 3rd Raiders using 10-man rubber boats in their first offensive action, Sgt. Strank (D Company) participated in the unopposed landing operations and occupation of Pavuvu (Operation Cleanslate) in the Russell Islands from February 21 to March 18, 1943. On March 19, the battalion left the island and returned to Guadalcanal and Espiritu Santo (Camp Rennie) on March 20. On May 1, D Company was designated as M Company, 3rd Raider Battalion, 1st Marine Raider Regiment, 1st Marine Amphibious Corps.

On November 1, 1943, the 2nd and 3rd Raider Battalions spearheaded the initial invasion of Bougainville by the 3rd Marine Division. Sgt. Strank, M Company, 3rd Raiders, landed on Green Beach #2 at Cape Torokina and participated in the seizure and occupation of Empress Augusta Bay (Operation Cherryblossom). On January 12, the 3rd Raiders were removed from the combat zone and returned to Guadalcanal, arriving on January 14. On February 1, the 1st Marine Raider Regiment was redesignated the 4th Marine Regiment. The 3rd Raider Battalion was disbanded and designated the 3rd Battalion, 4th Marine Regiment. On February 14, Sgt. Strank was sent to San Diego and allowed a leave to visit his family.

==== Battle of Iwo Jima ====
Sgt. Strank returned to duty in San Diego and was assigned to Second Platoon, Company E, 2nd Battalion, 28th Marine Regiment, 5th Marine Division at Marine Corps Base Camp Pendleton, as a squad leader. He was sent to Hawaii with his unit after extensive training, and began more training and preparation for the invasion of Iwo Jima.

==== First flag-raising ====
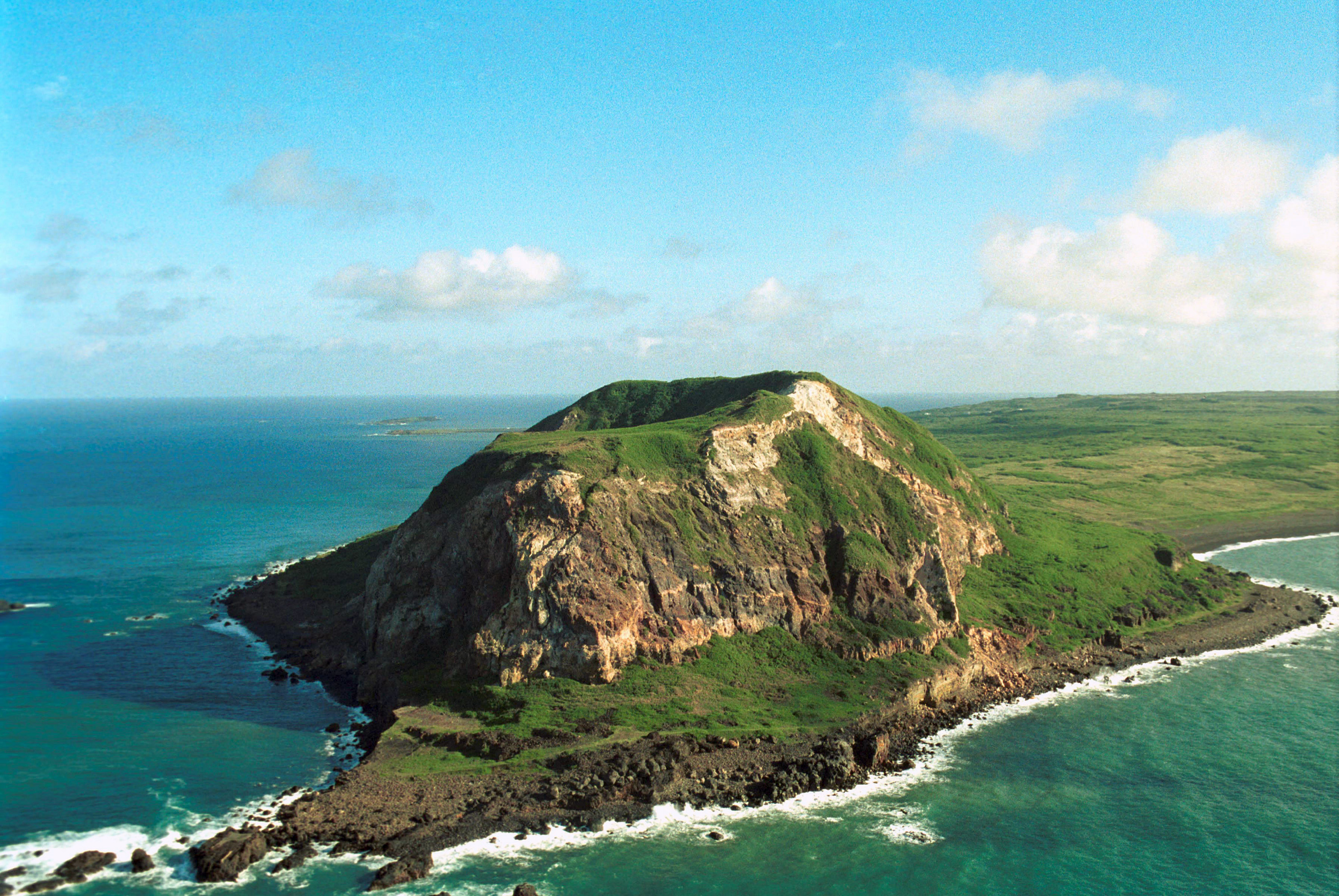
Mount Suribachi on Iwo Jima

Sgt. Strank took part in the Second Battalion, 28th Marines, amphibious assault landing on Green Beach at the southern part of Iwo Jima near Mount Suribachi on February 19, 1945. The mission of the 28th Marines that day was to isolate Mount Suribachi, which it accomplished. The next day, the regiment secured the southern end of the island. Their mission afterwards, was to capture Mount Suribachi. After heavy opposition, the 28th Marines surrounded the mountain by the evening of February 22. On the morning of February 23, Lieutenant Colonel Chandler W. Johnson, commander of the Second Battalion, 28th Marines, ordered E Company's executive officer, First Lieutenant Harold Schrier, to take a platoon-sized patrol up 556-foot high Mount Suribachi to seize and occupy the crest, and if possible, raise the battalion's American flag to signal the summit was secure. E Company's commander, Captain Dave Severance, assembled a 40-man patrol for the mission from the remainder of his Third Platoon and other members from the battalion.

The patrol left the base of Mount Suribachi at about 8:30 a.m. Once Lt. Schrier was on top with his men after some occasional sniper fire and a brief firefight at the rim of the crater, he and his men secured the top. After a Japanese steel pipe was found, Lt. Schrier and two other Marines attached the flag to it. The flagstaff was then taken to the highest position on top and raised by Lt. Schrier, Platoon Sgt. Ernest Thomas, Sergeant Henry Hansen, and Corporal Charles Lindberg at about 10:30 a.m. Seeing the raising of the national colors immediately caused loud cheers from the Marines, sailors, and Coast Guardsmen on the beaches at the southern end of Iwo Jima and from the men on the ships near the beaches. The men at, around, and holding the flagstaff were photographed several times by Marine Staff Sergeant Louis R. Lowery, a photographer with Leatherneck magazine who accompanied the patrol up the mountain. Platoon Sgt. Thomas was killed in action on Iwo Jima on March 3 and Sgt. Hansen was killed on March 1.

==== Second flag-raising ====
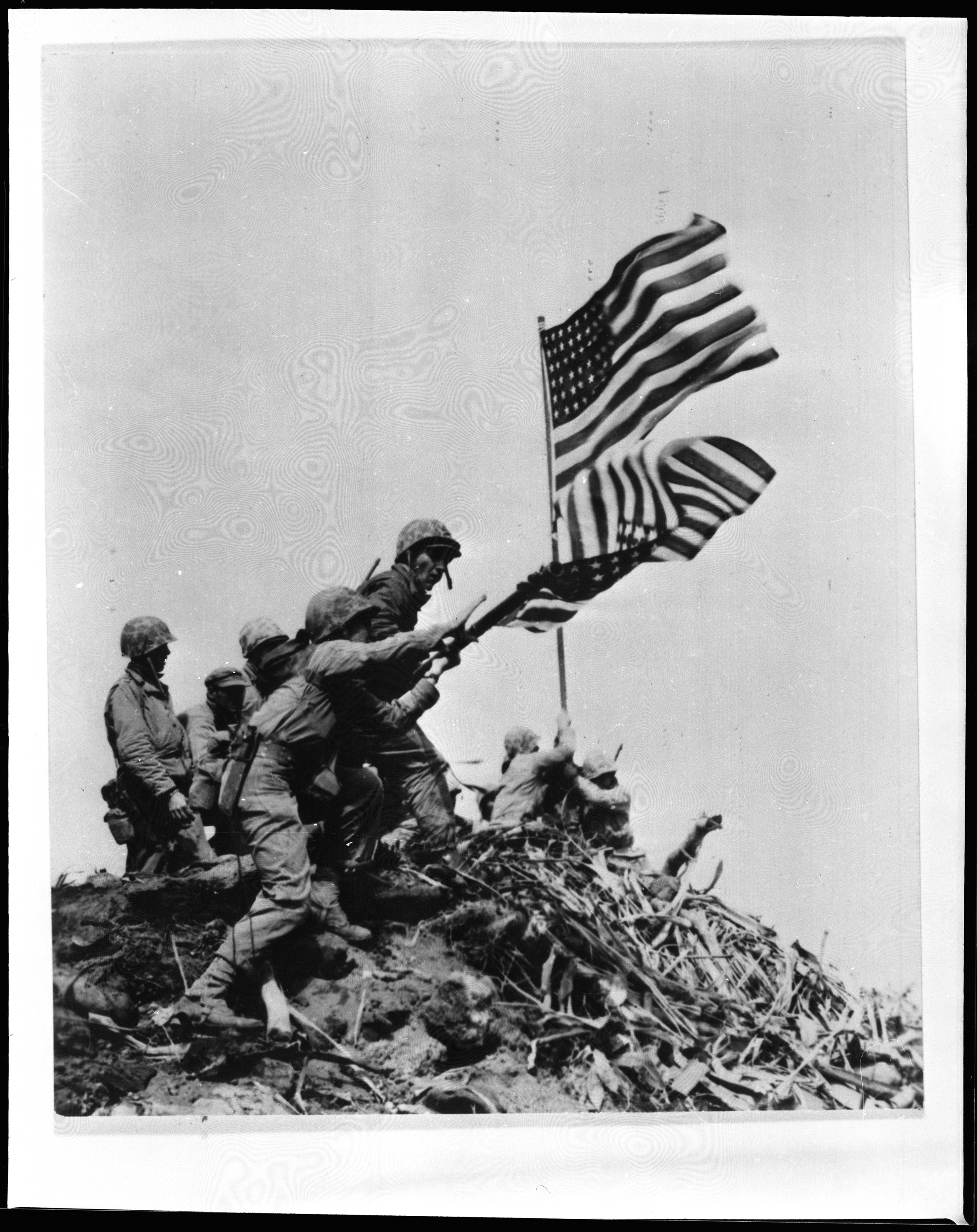
Marine Corps photo of the two flags on Mount Suribachi

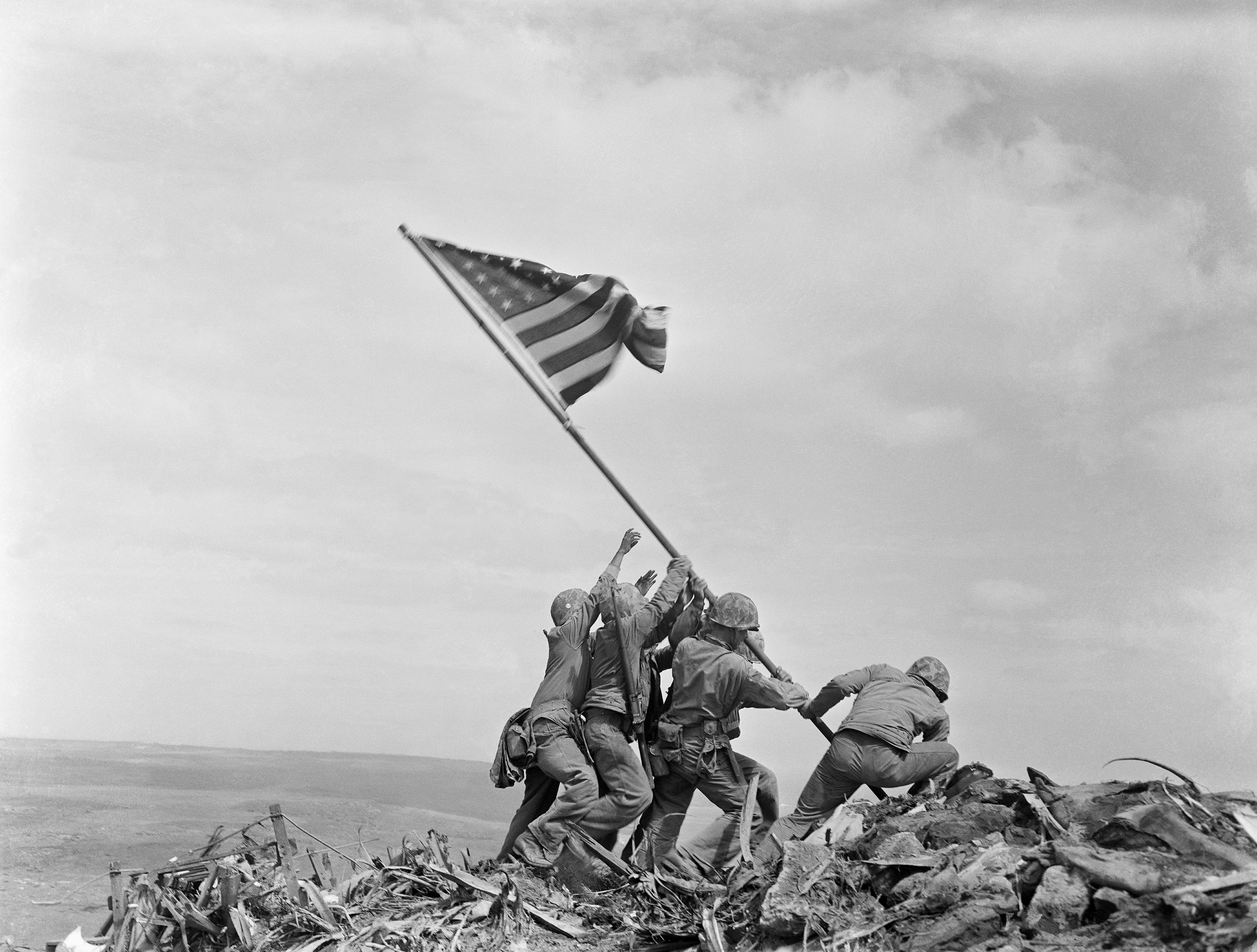
Second flag-raising photograph

Marine Sergeant Bill Genaust's color film of the second flag raising

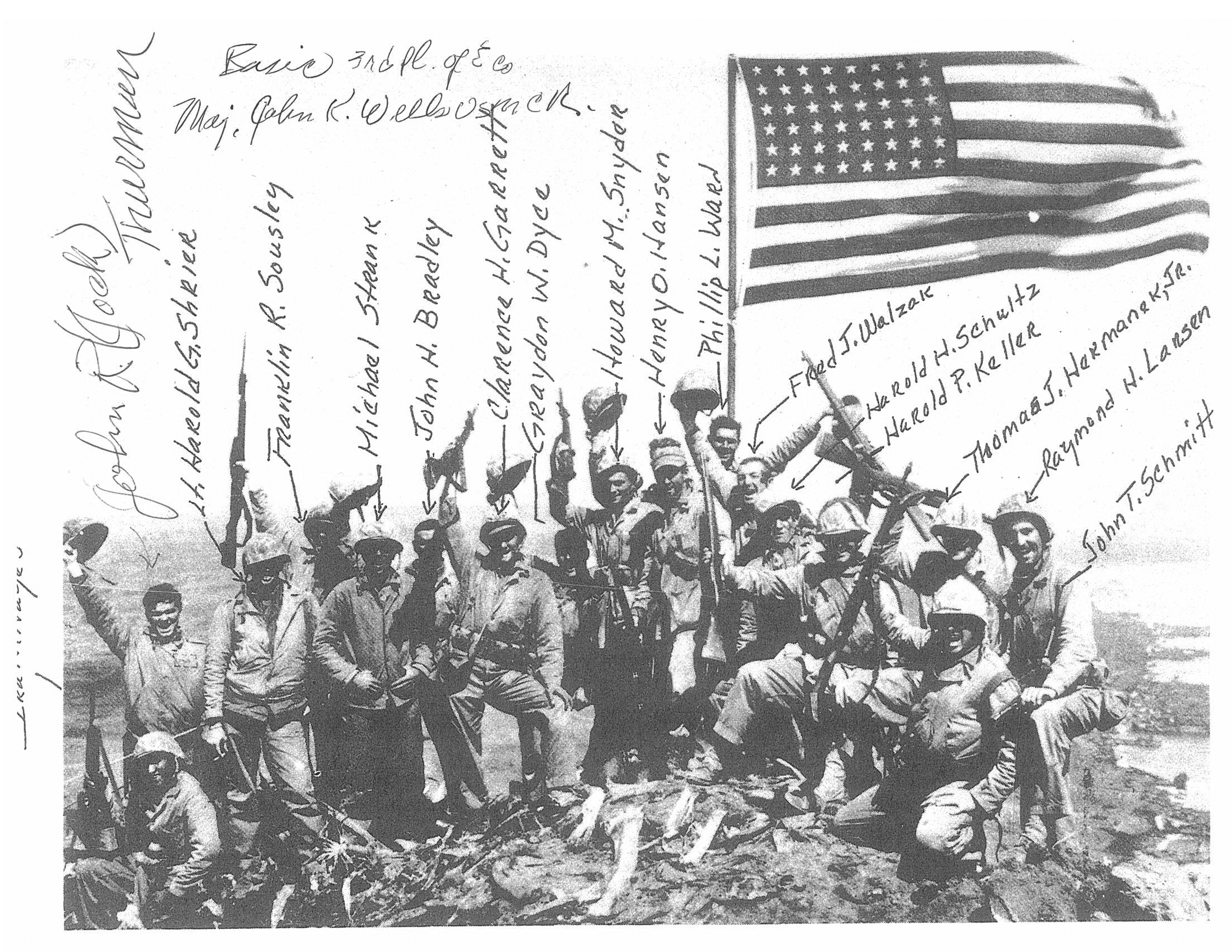
Strank is fifth from left in Joe Rosenthal's "Gung Ho" photo.

In order for the American flag to be seen more by the thousands of Marines fighting on the other side of Mount Suribachi where most of the Japanese soldiers were located, it was decided that a larger flag should replace the battalion's flag on Mount Suribachi. Captain Severance ordered Sgt. Strank to ascend Mount Suribachi with three Marines from his rifle squad in Second Platoon and raise the replacement flag. Sgt. Strank then ordered Corporal Harlon Block, Private First Class Ira Hayes, and Private First Class Franklin Sousley to go with him up Mount Suribachi with communication wire (or supplies). Private First Class Rene Gagnon, the Second Battalion's runner (messenger) for E Company, was ordered to take the replacement flag up the mountain and return with the first flag.

Once Sgt. Strank's team was on top, Pfc. Hayes and Pfc. Sousley found a Japanese steel pipe to attach the flag to. After the two Marines took the pipe to Sgt. Strank and Cpl. Block near the first flag, the flag was attached to the pipe. As the four Marines got into position to raise the flagstaff, Sgt. Strank and Cpl. Block called out to two nearby Marines to help them raise the heavy flagstaff. Then, under Lt. Schrier's orders, the second flag was raised at approximately 1 p.m. by Sgt. Strank, Cpl. Block, Pfc. Hayes, Pfc. Sousley, Pfc. Harold Schultz, and Pfc. Harold Keller, as the original flag came down. Pfc. Schultz and Pfc. Keller were members of Lt. Schrier's patrol. In order to keep the second flagstaff in a vertical position in the high winds on the summit, rocks were immediately added to the base of the flagstaff by Pfc. Schultz and Pfc. Keller, and another Marine. Three guy-ropes were then tied to the flagstaff to stabilize it. The six Marine flag-raisers were photographed in action by Associated Press photographer Joe Rosenthal and by Marine motion picture cameraman Sergeant William (Bill) Genaust (later killed in action) in color. After the second flag-raising, Rosenthal photographed sixteen Marines including Sgt. Strank and two Navy corpsmen around the base of the flagstaff. Rosenthal's black-and-white flag-raising picture, which appeared in newspapers on February 25, 1945, was later titled Raising the Flag on Iwo Jima. It became the most copied photograph in Marine Corps history.

On March 14, another American flag was officially raised up a flagpole by two Marines under the orders of Lt. Gen. Holland Smith during a ceremony at the V Amphibious Corps command post on the other side of Mount Suribachi where the 3rd Marine Division troops were located. The flag flying on the summit of Mount Suribachi since February 23 was taken down. On March 26, 1945, the island was considered secure and the battle of Iwo Jima was officially ended. The 28th Marines left Iwo Jima on March 27 and returned to Hawaii to the 5th Marine Division training camp. Lt. Col. Johnson was killed in action on March 2, Sgt. Genaust was killed on March 4, Sgt. Strank and Cpl. Block were killed on March 1, and Pfc. Sousley was killed on March 21.

On March 20, President Franklin D. Roosevelt ordered all the men in Rosenthal's photograph be sent to Washington, D.C. after the battle was over. Pfc. Gagnon arrived alone on April 7 and was questioned at Marine Headquarters by a public information officer about the identities of the six flag raisers. Pfc. Gagnon identified Navy corpsman John Bradley and Pfc. Ira Hayes as flag raisers in the photograph and they were sent for and arrived on April 19 and, they were separately questioned that day (Sgt. Strank, Cpl. Block, and Pfc. Sousley were killed on Iwo Jima). All three said they were in the photograph and raised the flag; on April 8, they had been named publicly by the Marine Corps as the surviving flag raisers. Over time it was discovered that all of the second flag-raisers were Marines and that three of the six Marines in Rosenthal's photograph were not correctly identified: Cpl. Block was not recognized until January 1947, Pfc. Schultz was not recognized until June 2016, and Pfc. Keller was not recognized until October 2019. Cpl. Block was incorrectly identified in the photograph as Henry Hansen. Pfc. Schultz was identified as Pfc. Sousley in the photograph. In turn, Pfc. Sousley was identified as PhM2c. Bradley in the photograph. Pfc. Keller was incorrectly identified as Pfc. Gagnon in the photograph. Rosenthal did not take the names of any of the flag raisers in his photograph. Pfc. Schultz and Pfc. Keller did not ever claim publicly to be in Rosenthal's photograph or that they were flag-raisers.

==== Death and burial ====
On February 28, Sgt. Strank and E Company moved northward. Fighting was heavy, and both the Japanese and the American forces were taking heavy casualties. On March 1, Sgt. Strank's rifle squad came under heavy fire and took cover. While forming a plan of attack, he was killed by friendly artillery fire. The shell that killed him was almost certainly fired from offshore by an American ship. Cpl. Harlon Block, Sgt. Strank's assistant squad leader, took command of the squad. Cpl. Block was killed later on the same day by a Japanese mortar shell. However, former Marine Ralph Griffiths of Second Platoon, Easy Company, said that Sgt. Strank and Cpl. Block were on both sides of him on March 1 and were killed by the same shell which wounded him. Sgt. Strank and the other Marines killed in action of the 28th Regiment were buried in the 5th Marine Division Cemetery on the island with the last rites of the Roman Catholic Church. Sgt. Strank (and possibly Cpl. Block) was the first person in Rosenthal's flag raising photograph to be killed. On January 13, 1949, his remains were reinterred in Grave 7179, Section 12, Arlington National Cemetery.

Sgt. Strank's brother, Peter Strank, was serving aboard the aircraft carrier USS Franklin in the South Pacific when Sgt. Strank was killed.

== Marine Corps War Memorial ==
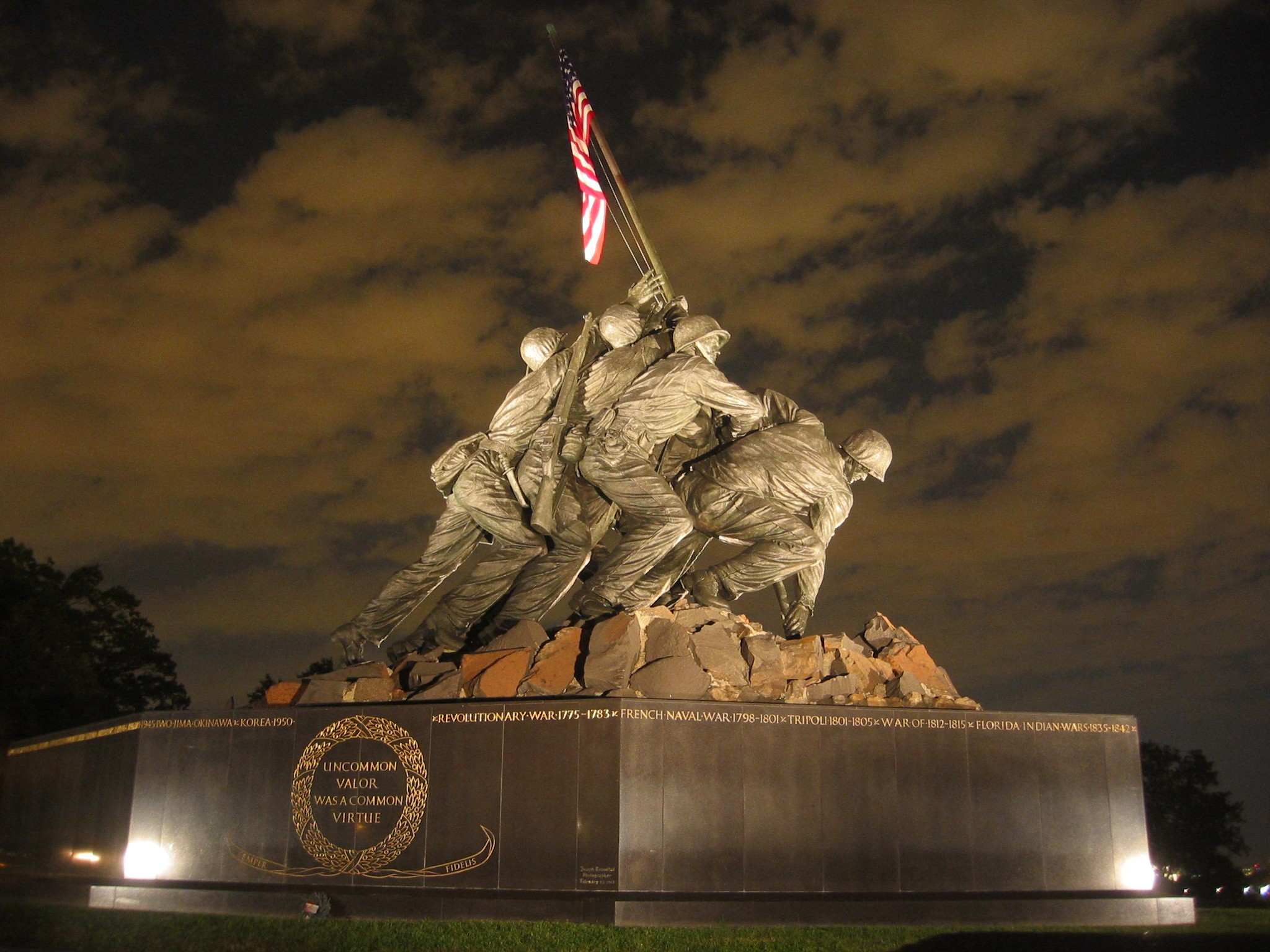
The U.S. Marine Corps War Memorial in Arlington, Virginia

The Marine Corps War Memorial in Arlington, Virginia, was dedicated on November 10, 1954. Sculptor Felix de Weldon was inspired to make the memorial after seeing Rosenthal's photograph of the second flag raising. De Weldon duplicated the flag raisers images and positions on the memorial from the photograph. Strank is depicted as the fourth bronze figure from the base of the flagstaff on the memorial with the 32-foot (9.8 M) bronze figures of the other five flag raisers depicted on the memorial. The Marine Corps announced on June 23, 2016, that Harold Schultz is now in back of Strank instead of Franklin Sousley, who is now in front of Strank instead of John Bradley, who is no longer in the photograph. The Memorial was turned over to the National Park Service in 1955.

During the dedication, President Dwight D. Eisenhower sat upfront with Vice President Richard Nixon, Secretary of Defense Charles E. Wilson, Deputy Secretary of Defense Robert Anderson, Assistant Secretary of the Interior Orme Lewis, and General Lemuel C. Shepherd, the 20th Commandant of the Marine Corps. Ira Hayes, one of the three surviving flag-raisers depicted on the monument, was seated together with John Bradley, Rene Gagnon, Mrs. Martha Strank, Ada Belle Block, and Mrs. Goldie Price (mother of Franklin Sousley). Those giving remarks at the dedication included Robert Anderson, Chairman of Day; Colonel J.W. Moreau, U.S. Marine Corps (Retired), President, Marine Corps War Memorial Foundation; General Shepherd, who presented the memorial to the American people; Felix de Weldon, sculptor; and Richard Nixon, who gave the dedication address. Inscribed on the memorial are the following words:

In Honor And Memory Of The Men of The United States Marine Corps Who Have Given Their Lives To Their Country Since 10 November 1775

== Military awards ==
Strank's military decorations and awards include:

Bronze Star Medal with Combat "V"	Purple Heart Medal	Navy Combat Action Ribbon
Navy Presidential Unit Citation	Marine Corps Good Conduct Medal	American Defense Service Medal
American Campaign Medal	Asiatic-Pacific Campaign Medal w/ four 3/16" bronze stars	World War II Victory Medal

== Legacy ==
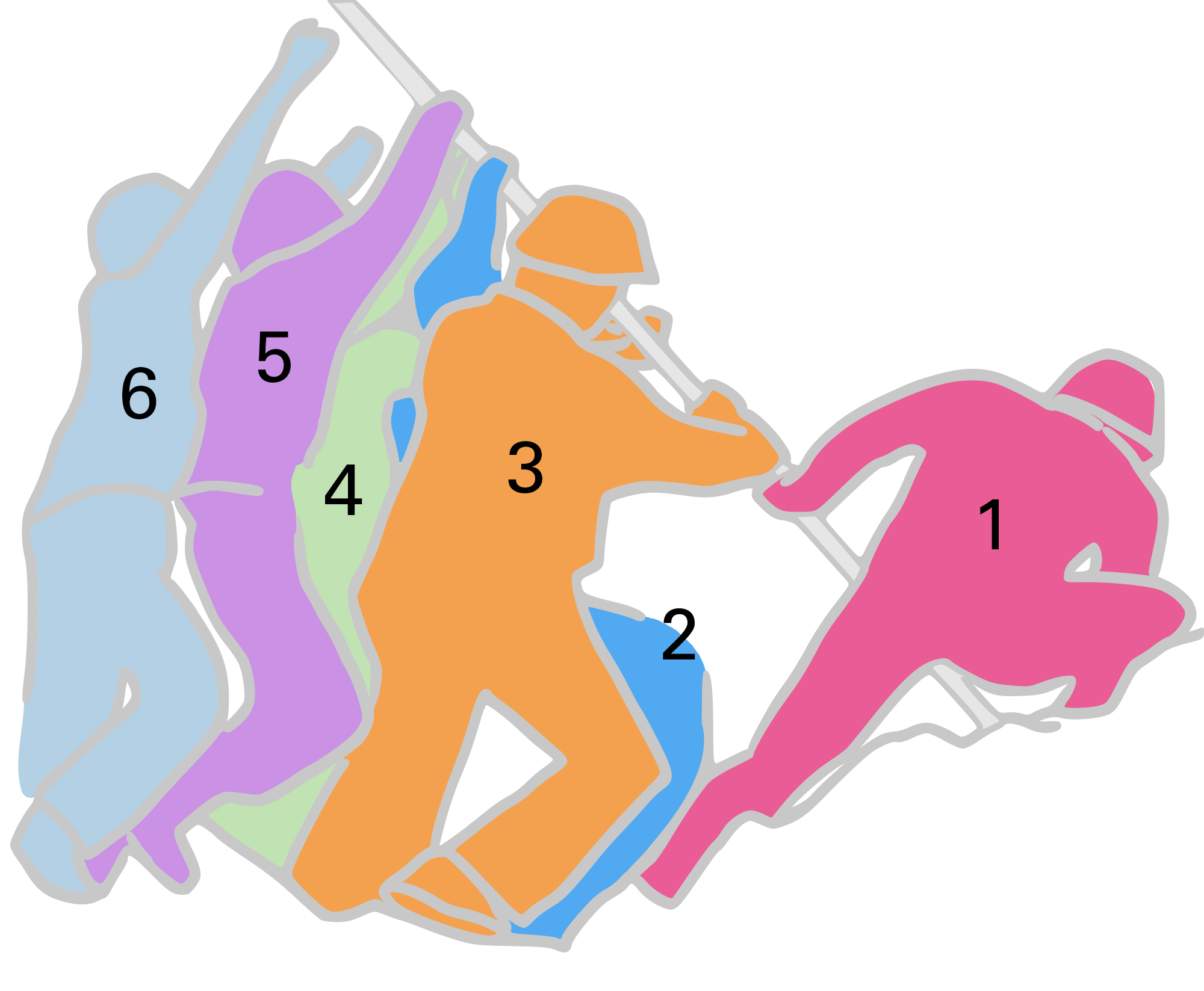
The six second flag-raisers: #1, Cpl. Harlon Block (KIA) #2, Pfc. Harold Keller #3, Pfc. Franklin Sousley (KIA) #4, Sgt. Michael Strank (KIA) #5, Pfc. Harold Schultz #6, Pfc. Ira Hayes

Strank was born on November 10, the Marine Corps birthday. The members of Strank's rifle squad idolized him (Cpl. Harlon Block for one followed his every instruction without question), and many men since who served with and alongside him have stated he had a way of setting them at ease, making them feel that he could help them survive the war. Of the men photographed raising the second flag on Mount Suribachi, Strank at age 25, was the oldest, and he and Harold Keller were the most experienced in combat.

In interviews of former Marines conducted years later, many documented in the book Flags of Our Fathers written by James Bradley (son of corpsman John Bradley), he is described by men who served with him as "a Marine's Marine", a true warrior and leader, who led his men by example. Strank often told his men, "Follow me, and I'll try to bring you all safely home to your mothers." One former Marine who served with Strank stated, "He was the kind of Marine you read about, the kind they make movies about." Former Paramarine Lowell B. Holly, who served in Strank's squad on Iwo Jima and who was with Strank when he died, stated, "He was the best Marine I ever knew."

== U.S. citizenship ==
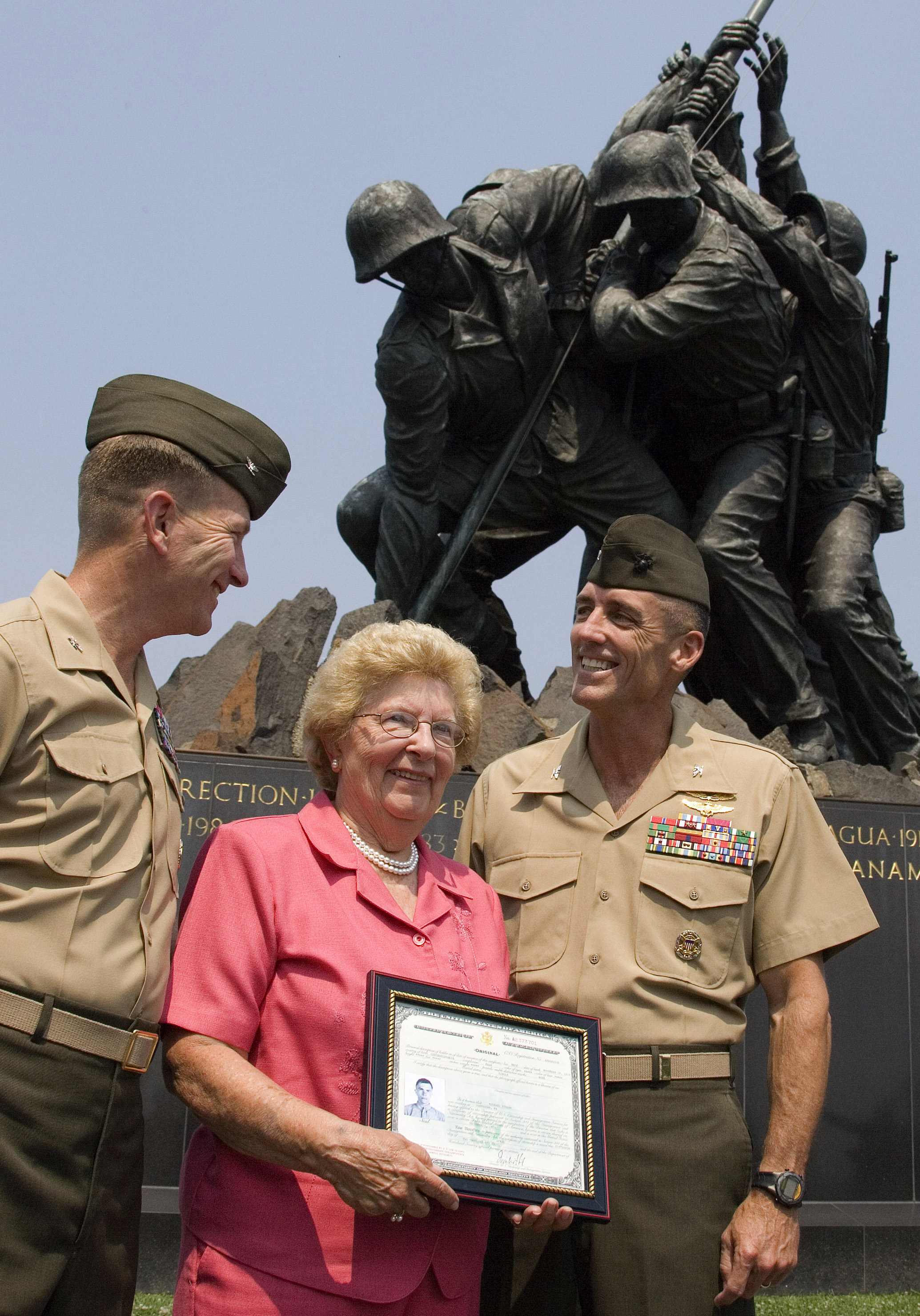
Mary Pero, 75, was presented with her late brother's certificate of citizenship on July 29, 2008, at the Marine Corps War Memorial.

In 2008, Gunnery Sergeant Matt Blais, who was a Marine security guard in the American Embassy in Slovakia, discovered that Strank was not a natural-born U.S. citizen. Strank had become a U.S. citizen after his father's naturalization in 1935, but had never received official documentation. GySgt. Blais petitioned the United States Citizenship and Immigration Services on Strank's behalf and on July 29, 2008, Strank's youngest sister, Mary Pero, was presented with his certificate of citizenship in a ceremony at the Marine Corps War Memorial.

== Monuments and memorials ==
Strank's public recognitions include:

- Sgt. Michael Strank statue: Marine Corps War Memorial, Arlington, Virginia
- Sgt. Michael Strank - Pennsylvania Historical Marker: Franklin Borough, Cambria County, Pennsylvania.
- Sgt. Michael Strank Marine Corps Reserve Center (NMCRC), Ebensburg, Pennsylvania. This building was opened in 1987 and later decommissioned in 2019.
- Sergeant Michael Strank Memorial Bridge: crosses Little Conemaugh River on PA 271 in East Conemaugh
- Michael Strank mini-sculpture (English spelling name and surname): located near school #4 in Uzhhorod, Ukraine (installed on February 16, 2015, the 70th anniversary of liberation of the city at the end of World War II).
- Stará Ľubovňa, Slovakia

== Portrayal in film ==
Strank is prominently featured in the 2006 movie Flags of Our Fathers. In the movie, Sgt. Strank is played by Canadian actor Barry Pepper. The movie is based on the 2000 book of the same title.

In 2016, Radio and Television of Slovakia filmed a documentary about Sgt. Strank called "Chlapec, ktorý chcel byť prezidentom" ("The boy who wanted to be a president"). It was aired for the first time on May 2, 2017.

In 2019, an English version of the documentary "Chlapec, ktorý chcel byť prezidentom" had premiered in the United States under the title, "The Oath".

== See also ==
- Meliton Kantaria – Soviet flag raiser over the Reichstag in Berlin, 1945
- Mikhail Yegorov – Soviet flag raiser over the Reichstag in Berlin, 1945
