= Jarabina =

Village and municipality in Slovakia

- Municipality
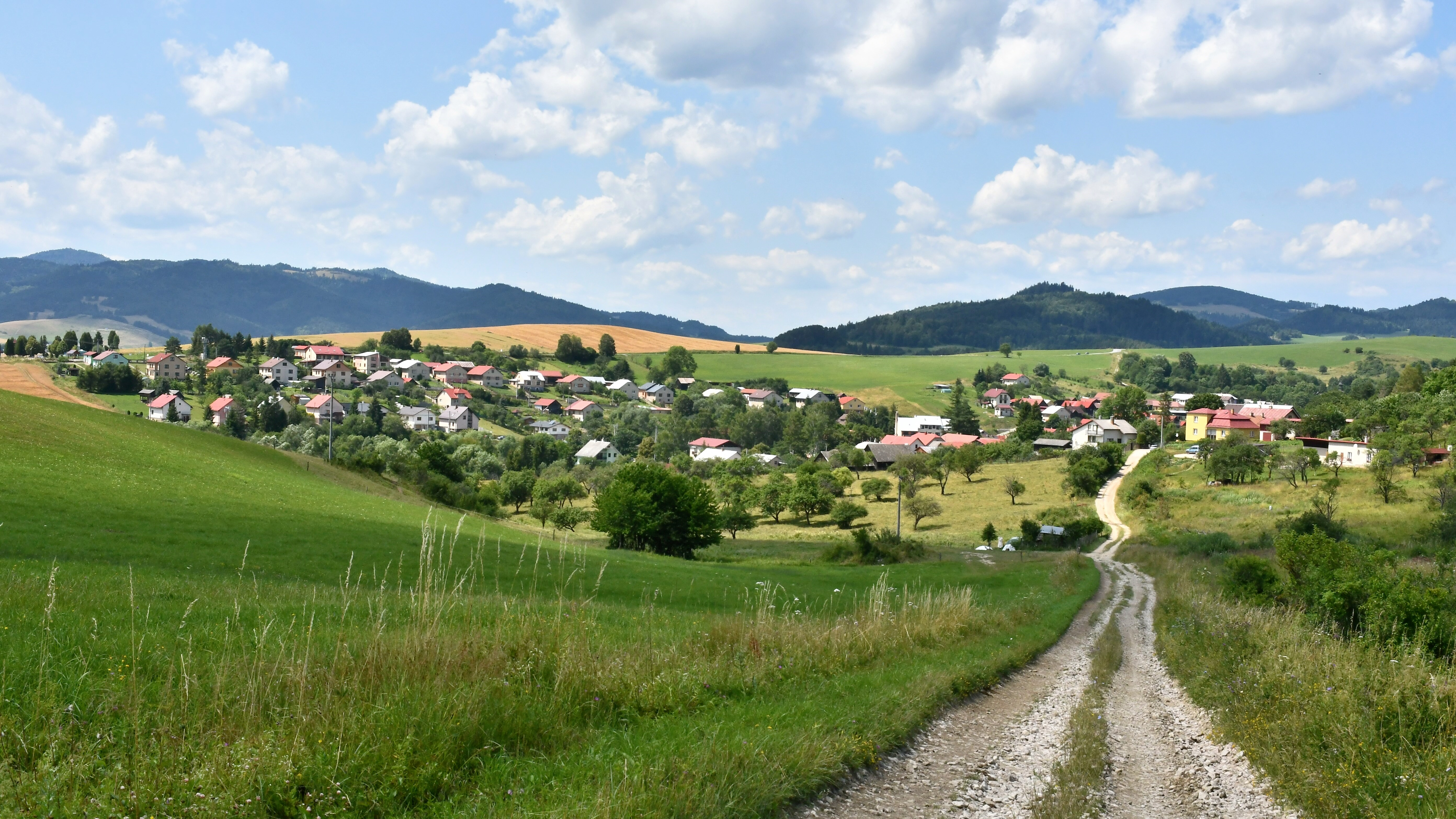

- Flag

- Location of Jarabina in the Prešov Region Location of Jarabina in Slovakia
- Coordinates: 49.33°N 20.67°E
- Country: Slovakia
- Region: Prešov Region
- District: Stará Ľubovňa District
- First mentioned: 1329

Area
  - Total: 22.88 km^{2} (8.83 sq mi)
- Elevation: 586 m (1,923 ft)

Population (2025)
  - Total: 930
- Time zone: UTC+1 (CET)
  - Summer (DST): UTC+2 (CEST)
- Postal code: 653 1
- Area code: +421 52
- Vehicle registration plate (until 2022): SL
- Website: www.obecjarabina.sk

Jarabina, also known as Orjabyna (Rusyn: Орябина; Hungarian: Berkenyéd; German: Girm; Polish: Jarzębina) is a village and municipality in Stará Ľubovňa District in the Prešov Region of northern Slovakia.

U.S. Marine Michael Strank, Flag Raiser at Iwo Jima, was born here.

== History ==
In historical records the village was first mentioned in 1329. Before the establishment of independent Czechoslovakia in 1918, Jarabina was part of Szepes County within the Kingdom of Hungary. From 1939 to 1945, it was part of the Slovak Republic. On 24 January 1945, the Red Army dislodged the Wehrmacht from Jarabina and it was once again part of Czechoslovakia.

== Geography ==
The municipality lies at an altitude of 586 metres (1,923 ft) and covers an area of 22.88 km^{2} (8.83 sq mi) (2025).

== Population ==
Population statistic (10 years)
Year	1995	2005	2015	2025
Count	826	847	902	930
Difference		+2.54%	+6.49%	+3.10%

Population statistic
Year	2024	2025
Count	925	930
Difference		+0.54%

It has a population of 930 people (31 December 2025).

=== Ethnicity ===
Census 2021 (1+ %)
Ethnicity	Number	Fraction
Slovak	507	55.16%
Rusyn	438	47.66%
Ukrainian	78	8.48%
Romani	71	7.72%
Not found out	43	4.67%
Total	919	

In year 2021 was 919 people by ethnicity 507 as Slovak, 438 as Rusyn, 78 as Ukrainian, 71 as Romani, 43 as Not found out, 8 as Polish, 8 as Other, 3 as Czech and 3 as Russian.

Note on population: The difference values of population numbers in the table "Population statistic" and in the sections "Ethnicity" & "Religion" is caused by the use of various statistical methods.

=== Religion ===
Census 2021 (1+ %)
Religion	Number	Fraction
Eastern Orthodox Church	420	45.7%
Greek Catholic Church	243	26.44%
Roman Catholic Church	156	16.97%
None	58	6.31%
Not found out	37	4.03%
Total	919	

In year 2021 was 919 people by religion 420 from Eastern Orthodox Church, 243 from Greek Catholic Church, 156 from Roman Catholic Church, 58 from None, 37 from Not found out, 4 from Christian Congregations in Slovakia and 1 from Old Catholic Church.

== Genealogical resources ==
The records for genealogical research are available at the state archive "Statny Archiv in Levoca, Slovakia"

- Roman Catholic church records (births/marriages/deaths): 1852-1927 (parish B)
- Greek Catholic church records (births/marriages/deaths): 1789-1929 (parish A)

== See also ==
- List of municipalities and towns in Slovakia
