= Ira Hayes =

US Marine Corps corporal (1923–1955)

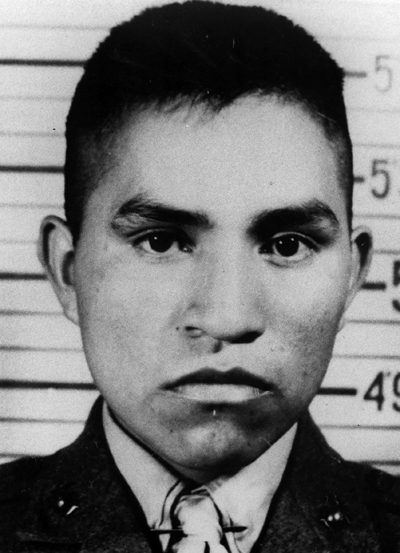
- Marine Corps recruit photo of Hayes in 1942
- Born: Ira Hamilton Hayes; January 12, 1923; Sacaton, Arizona, U.S.
- Died: January 24, 1955 (aged 32); Bapchule, Arizona, U.S.
- Burial place: Section 34, Arlington National Cemetery
- Military career
- Allegiance: United States
- Branch: United States Marine Corps
- Service years: 1942–1945
- Rank: Corporal
- Nicknames: "Chief Falling Cloud", "Chief"
- Units: 3rd Parachute Battalion; 2nd Battalion, 28th Marines; 1st Headquarters Battalion, HQMC
- Conflicts: World War II; Vella Lavella; Bougainville Campaign; Solomon Islands campaign; Battle of Iwo Jima
- Awards: Navy and Marine Corps Commendation Medal with Combat "V"; Combat Action Ribbon

Ira Hamilton Hayes (January 12, 1923 – January 24, 1955) was a United States Marine during World War II. Hayes was an enrolled member of the Gila River Indian Community, located in Pinal and Maricopa counties in Arizona. He enlisted in the United States Marine Corps Reserve on August 26, 1942, and, after recruit training, volunteered to become a Paramarine. He fought in the Bougainville and Iwo Jima campaigns in the Pacific War.

Hayes was one of the six men who appeared in the iconic photograph Raising the Flag on Iwo Jima by photographer Joe Rosenthal. The first flag raised over Mount Suribachi on February 23, 1945 at the south end of Iwo Jima, was deemed too small and was replaced the same day by a larger flag. A photo of the second flag-raising, which included Hayes in it, became famous and was widely reproduced. After the battle, Hayes and two other men were identified as surviving second flag-raisers and were reassigned to help raise funds for the Seventh War Loan drive. In 1946, after his service in the Marine Corps, he was instrumental in revealing the correct identity of one of the Marines in the photograph.

After the war, Hayes suffered from post-traumatic stress disorder and descended into alcoholism. On November 10, 1954, he attended the dedication of the Marine Corps War Memorial in Arlington County, Virginia, which was modeled after the photograph of Hayes and five other Marines raising the second flag on Iwo Jima. After a night of heavy drinking on January 23–24, 1955, he died of exposure due to the cold and alcohol poisoning. He was buried with full military honors at Arlington National Cemetery on February 2, 1955.

Hayes was commemorated in art and film, before and after his death. In 1949, he portrayed himself raising the flag in the movie Sands of Iwo Jima, starring John Wayne. He was the subject of an article by journalist William Bradford Huie, which was adapted for the feature film The Outsider (1961), starring Tony Curtis as Hayes. The movie inspired songwriter Peter La Farge to write "The Ballad of Ira Hayes", which became popular nationwide in 1964 after being recorded by Johnny Cash. In 2006, Hayes was portrayed by Adam Beach in the World War II movie Flags of Our Fathers, directed by Clint Eastwood.

== Early life ==
Ira Hayes was born in Sacaton, Arizona, a town in the Gila River Indian Community in Pinal County. He was the eldest of six children born to Nancy Whitaker (1901–1972) and Joseph Hayes (1901–1986). The Hayes children were: Ira (1923–1955), Harold (1924–1925), Leonard (1925–1962), Kenneth (1931–2019), Arlene (1933–1938) and Vernon (1937–1957). Joseph Hayes was a World War I veteran who supported his family by subsistence farming and its cotton harvesting. Nancy Hayes was a devout Presbyterian and a Sunday school teacher at the Assemblies of God church in Sacaton.

Hayes was remembered by his family and friends as being a shy and sensitive child. Sara Bernal, his niece, said, "Ira Hayes was a very quiet man; he would go days without saying anything unless you spoke to him first. The other Hayes children would play and tease me, but not Ira. He was quiet, and somewhat distant. Ira didn't speak unless spoken to. He was just like his father." His boyhood friend Dana Norris said, "Even though I'm from the same culture, I could never get under his skin. Ira had the characteristic of not wanting to talk. But we Pimas are not prone to tooting our own horns. Ira was a quiet guy, such a quiet guy." Despite this, Hayes was a precocious child who displayed an impressive grasp of the English language, a language that many Pima never learned to speak. He learned to read and write by the age of four and was a voracious reader.

In 1932, the family settled in Bapchule, Arizona, approximately 12 miles northwest of Sacaton. The Hayes children attended grade school in Sacaton and high school at the Phoenix Indian School in Phoenix, Arizona.

Ira Hayes was working as a carpenter during the Japanese attack on Pearl Harbor in December 1941. Hayes confided to his classmate Eleanor Pasquale after the Japanese attack that he was determined to serve in the United States Marine Corps. Pasquale said, "Every morning in school, [the students] would get a report on World War II. We would sing the anthems of the Army, Marines, and the Navy." Hayes completed two years at the Phoenix Indian School and served in the Civilian Conservation Corps in May and June 1942. He worked as a carpenter before enlisting in the military.

== US Marine Corps ==
=== World War II ===
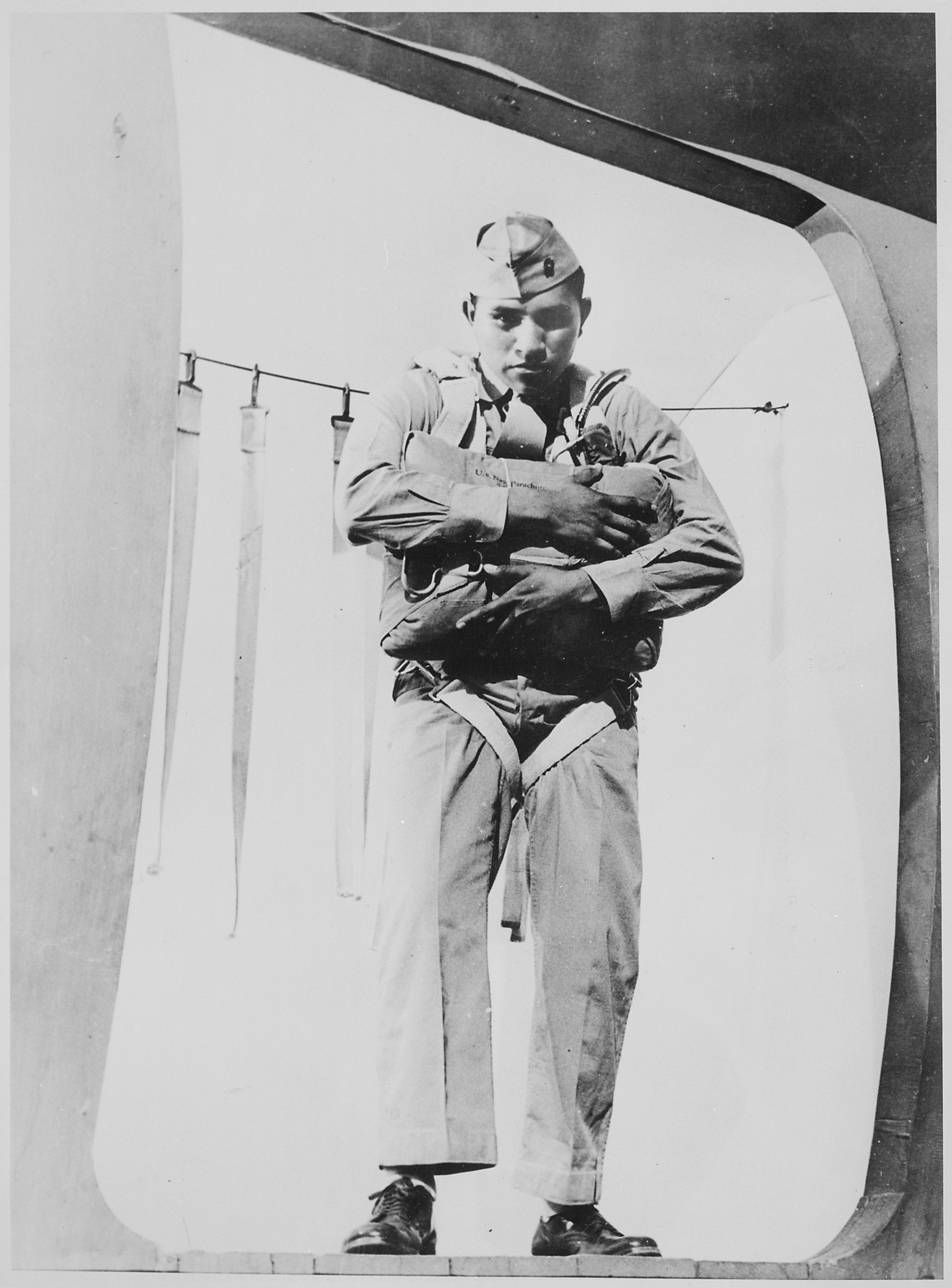
Hayes at Camp Gillespie, Marine Corps Parachute School in 1942

Hayes enlisted in the Marine Corps Reserve on August 26, 1942. He completed recruit training in Platoon 701 at Marine Corps Base, San Diego (renamed in 1948 to Marine Corps Recruit Depot, San Diego) and in October volunteered for Marine paratrooper (Paramarine) training at the Marine Parachute School at Camp Gillespie located east of San Diego. Ira Hayes became the first Pima in history to receive his paratrooper wings, to which he received the codename of Chief Falling Cloud. On November 30, he graduated from the Parachute Training School and received his silver "jump wings". On December 1, he was promoted to private first class.

On December 2, 1942, he joined Company B, 3rd Parachute Battalion, Divisional Special Troops, 3rd Marine Division, at Camp Elliott, California. On March 14, 1943, Hayes sailed for New Caledonia with the 3rd Parachute Battalion, which was assigned to Camp Kiser there on March 25 until September 26; the unit was redesignated in April as Company K, 3rd Parachute Battalion, 1st Marine Parachute Regiment of the I Marine Amphibious Corps. The 3rd Parachute Battalion was shipped to Guadalcanal and remained there until it was sent to Vella Lavella, arriving on October 14 for occupational duty. On December 4, Hayes landed with the 3rd Parachute Battalion on Bougainville and fought against the Japanese as a platoon automatic rifleman (BAR man) with Company K during the Bougainville Campaign. The 3rd Parachute Battalion was shipped back to Guadalcanal, and he stayed there until sometime in February, when the Paramarines were sent back to California. The 1st Parachute Regiment was officially disbanded at Camp Pendleton, California, in February 1944.

Hayes was transferred to Company E, 2nd Battalion, 28th Marine Regiment of the newly activated 5th Marine Division at Camp Pendleton. Hayes sailed to Hawaii with his company in September for continued training with the 5th division at Camp Tarawa as it trained for the invasion and capture of Iwo Jima.

==== Battle of Iwo Jima ====
The 5th Marine Division landed on Iwo Jima on February 19, 1945. Easy Company, Second Battalion, 28th Marines, landed on the southern beach near Mount Suribachi off of USS Talladega after transferring from USS Missoula. The island was defended by over 20,000 Japanese soldiers who were entrenched in fortifications and willing to fight to the death. At the end, only 216 Japanese soldiers would survive the battle.

==== First flag-raising ====
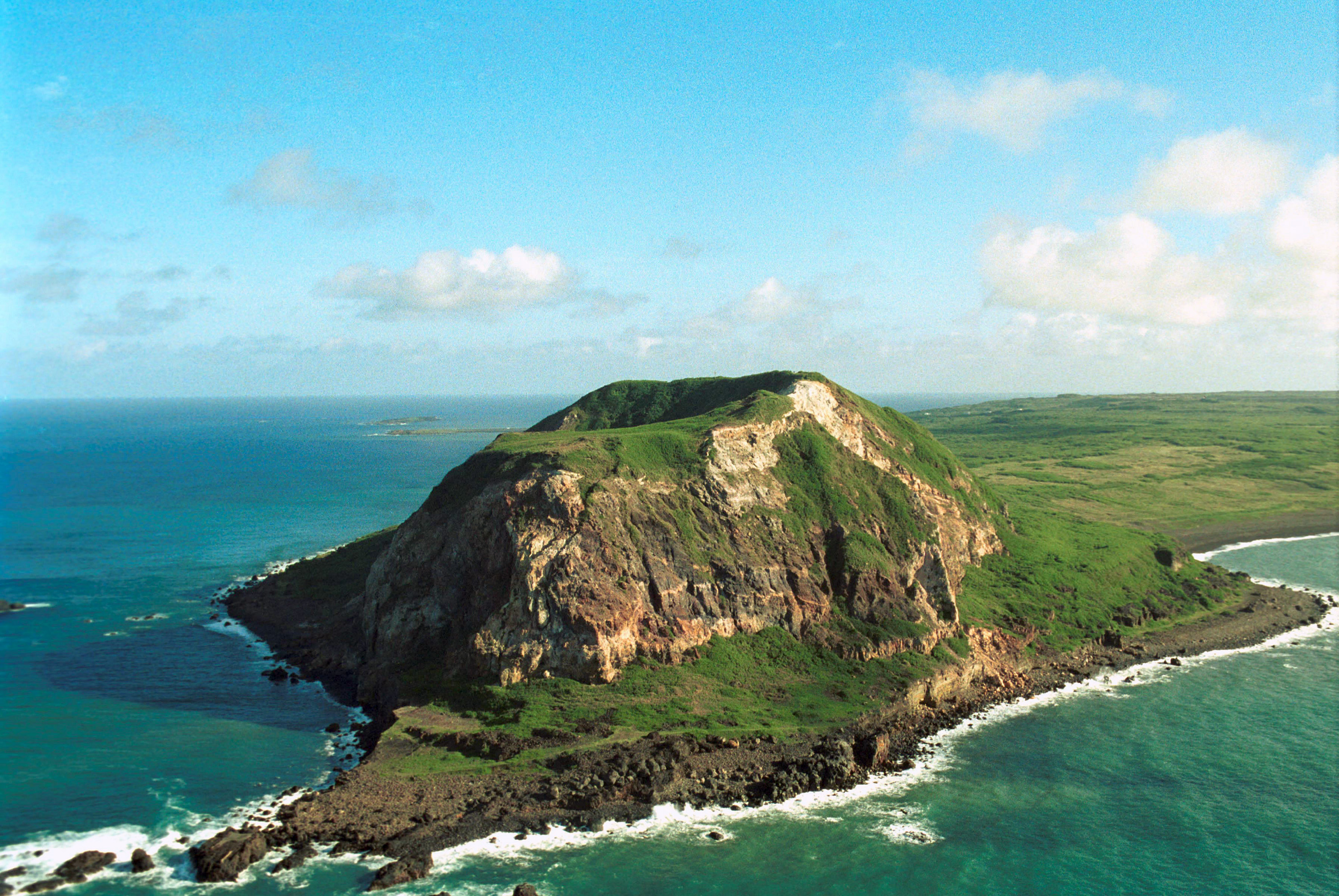
Mount Suribachi on Iwo Jima

After four days of fighting, the Marines finally made their way onto the slopes of the mountain. On February 23, Lieutenant Colonel Chandler W. Johnson, the Second Battalion commander, ordered a combat patrol to climb, seize, and occupy the top of Mount Suribachi (an inactive volcano) and raise the battalion's flag if possible to signal it was secure. Captain Dave Severance, commander of E Company, organized a 40-man patrol taken from the remainder of his Third Platoon and the battalion. First Lieutenant Harold Schrier, the company's executive officer, was chosen by Lt. Col. Johnson to be in command of the patrol. At 8:30 am, the patrol started to climb the east slope of Suribachi. The patrol included two Navy corpsmen and stretcher bearers. Less than an hour later, after receiving occasional Japanese sniper fire, the patrol reached the rim of the volcano. After a brief firefight there, Lt. Schrier and his men captured the summit. After finding a Japanese steel pipe and attaching the flag to it, the flagstaff was taken to the highest place on the crater. At about 10:30 a.m., Lt. Schrier, Platoon Sergeant Ernest Thomas, Sergeant Henry Hansen, and Corporal Charles Lindberg raised the flag. Seeing the raising of the national colors immediately caused loud cheering from the Marines, sailors, and Coast Guardsmen on the beach below and from the men on the ships docked at the beach. Due to the high winds on Mount Suribachi, Sgt. Hansen, Pvt. Phil Ward, and Navy corpsman John Bradley pitched in to help make the flagstaff stay in a vertical position. The men at, around, and holding the flagstaff were photographed several times by Marine Staff Sergeant Louis R. Lowery, a photographer with Leatherneck magazine who accompanied the patrol up the mountain. Platoon Sgt. Thomas was killed on Iwo Jima on March 3 and Sgt. Hansen was killed on March 1.

==== Second flag-raising ====
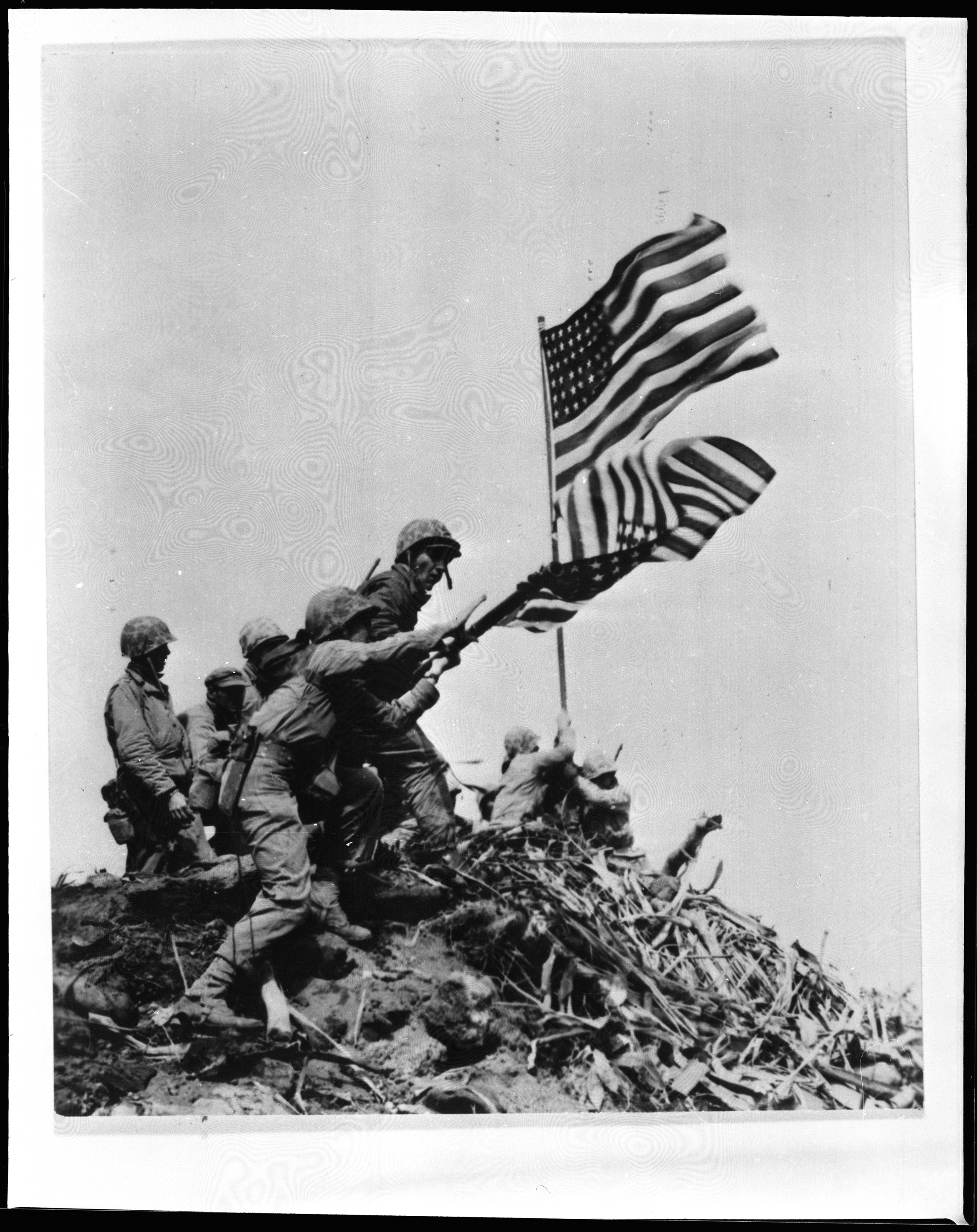
Marine Corps photo of the two flags on Mount Suribachi

Marine Sergeant Genaust's film of the second flag raising

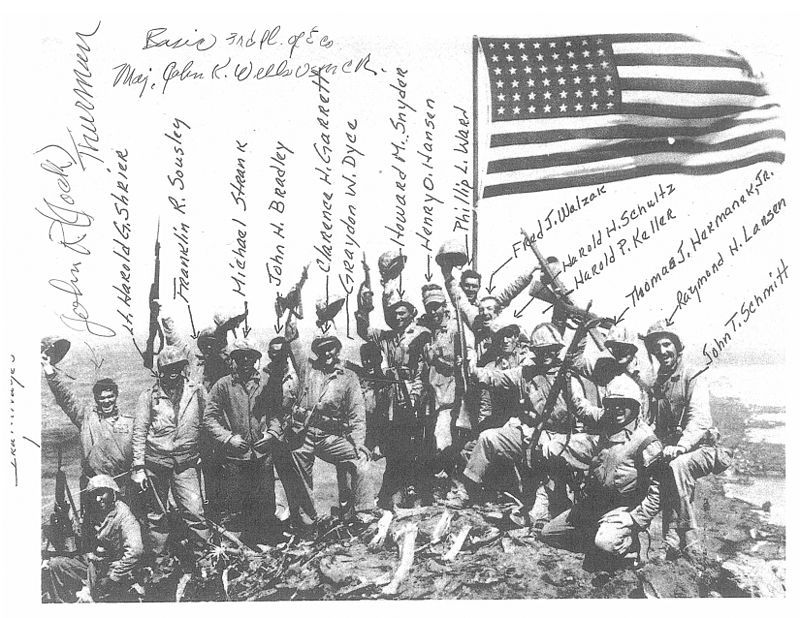
Joe Rosenthal's "Gung Ho" photograph taken after the second flag raising (Hayes is far left-bottom)

The first flag flying over Mount Suribachi at the south end of Iwo Jima was regarded to be too small to be seen by the thousands of Marines fighting on the other side of Iwo Jima. The Marines in command and Lt. Col. Johnson decided that a larger flag should be taken on top and flown on the mountain. In the early afternoon, Capt. Severance ordered Sgt. Michael Strank, a rifle squad leader from Second Platoon, E Company, to ascend Mount Suribachi with three Marines from his squad and raise the larger flag. Sgt. Strank then ordered Cpl. Harlon Block, PFC Hayes, and PFC Franklin Sousley to go with him up Suribachi with supplies (or communication wire). PFC Rene Gagnon the Second Battalion's runner (messenger) for E Company was ordered to take "walkie-talkie" batteries and the replacement flag up the mountain, and return the first flag to the battalion adjutant down below.

When all five Marines were on top, a Japanese steel pipe was found by PFC Hayes and PFC Sousley, who carried the pipe to Sgt. Strank and Cpl. Block near the first flag. The second flag was attached to the pipe and, as Sgt. Strank and his three Marines were about to raise the flagstaff, he yelled out to two nearby Marines from Schrier's patrol to help them raise it. At approximately 1 p.m., Lt. Schrier ordered the raising of the second flag and the lowering of the original flag. The second flag was raised by Sgt. Strank, Cpl. Block, PFC Hayes, PFC Sousley, PFC Harold Schultz, and PFC Harold Keller. After the flag was raised, rocks were added at the bottom of the flagstaff by PFC Schultz and PFC Keller, which was then stabilized by three guy-ropes because of the high winds on top.

The raising of the second American flag on Mount Suribachi on February 23, 1945, was immortalized by Associated Press combat photographer Joe Rosenthal and became an icon of the world war.

On March 14, another American flag was officially raised up a flagpole by two Marines under the orders of Lieutenant General Holland Smith during a ceremony at the V Amphibious Corps command post on the other side of Mount Suribachi where the 3rd Marine Division troops were located to signal the Marines occupied Iwo Jima. The flag flying on top of Mount Suribachi that Hayes helped raise was taken down.

Hayes fought on the island until it was secure on March 26. The same day, he attended the service for the American troops buried at the 5th Marine Division Cemetery. Hayes boarded the USS Winged Arrow and left Iwo Jima with his unit for Hawaii on March 27. Easy Company had many casualties, and Hayes was one of five marines remaining from his original platoon of 45 men, including their corpsmen. Sgt. Strank and Cpl. Block were killed on Iwo Jima on March 1, and PFC Sousley was killed on March 21.

==== 7th war bond selling tour ====
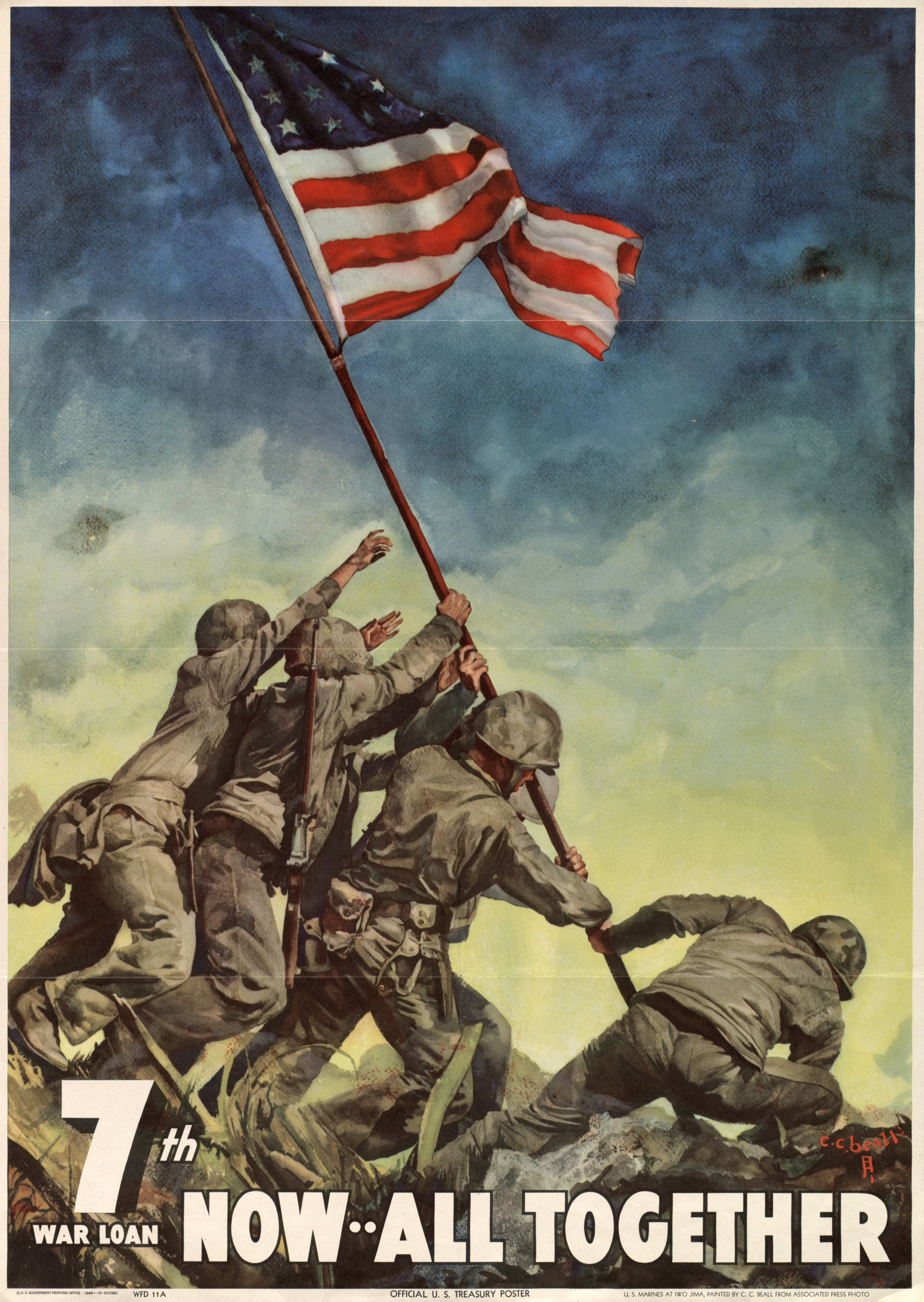
Seventh War Loan Drive Poster (May 11–July 4, 1945)

Once he arrived in Hawaii, Hayes continued to train with E Company at Camp Tarawa. During the battle President Franklin D. Roosevelt had ordered that the flag raisers in Joe Rosenthal's photograph be sent immediately after the battle to Washington, D.C., to appear as a public morale factor. PFC Gagnon had returned with E Company to Camp Tarawa when he was ordered on April 3 to report to Marine Corps headquarters at Washington, D.C. He arrived on April 7, and was questioned by a lieutenant colonel at Marine Corps public information office concerning the identities of the flag raisers in the Rosenthal photo. Gagnon named Marines Michael Strank (KIA), Henry Hansen (KIA), Franklin Sousley (KIA), Ira Hayes, Navy corpsman John Bradley, and himself. On April 8, the Marine Corps gave a press release of the names of the six flag raisers in the Rosenthal photograph which had been given by Gagnon including Hayes'. Hayes and Bradley were ordered to report to Marine Corps headquarters; After the war, the Marine Corps determined that Hansen (1947), Bradley (2016), and Gagnon (2019) were not second flag-raisers.

President Roosevelt died on April 12, and Vice President Harry S. Truman was sworn in as President the same day. After Bradley was evacuated from Iwo Jima in March, he was recovering from his wounds at Oakland Naval Hospital in Oakland, California when he was ordered to Washington. He was transferred to Bethesda Naval Hospital in Bethesda, Maryland, where he was shown Rosenthal's flag-raising photograph and was told he was in it. Bradley arrived in Washington, D.C., on crutches on or about April 19. Hayes left Hawaii on April 15 and arrived in Washington on April 19 and was assigned to C Company, 1st Headquarters Battalion, Marine Corps Headquarters. Both men were questioned separately by the same Marine officer that Gagnon met with concerning the identities of the six flag-raisers in the Rosenthal photograph. Bradley agreed with all six names of the flag raisers in the photo given by Gagnon including his own. Hayes agreed with all the names including his own except he said that the man identified as Sgt. Hansen at the base of the flagstaff in the photo was really Cpl. Harlon Block. The Marine interviewer then told Hayes that a list of the names of the six flag-raisers in the photo were already released publicly; and besides Block and Hansen were both killed in action (during the Marine Corps investigation in 1946, the lieutenant colonel denied Hayes ever mentioned Block's name to him).

After the interview was over, it was requested that PFC Gagnon, PFC Hayes, and Navy corpsman Bradley participate in the Seventh War Loan drive to help defray the massive war debt by selling war bonds. On April 20, Gagnon, Hayes, and Bradley met President Truman at the White House and each showed him their positions in the second flag raising poster that was on display there for the upcoming bond tour that they would participate in. A press conference was also held that day and Gagnon, Hayes, and Bradley were questioned about the flag raising.

On May 9, a flag-raising by PFC Hayes, PFC Gagnon, and PhM2c. Bradley during a ceremony at the nation's capital kicked off the bond-selling tour; the flag was the same one that had been raised on Mount Suribachi. The tour began on May 11 in New York City. On May 24, Pfc. Hayes was ordered to report to the 28th Marines in Hawaii. PFC Hayes left Washington on May 25 and arrived at Hilo, Hawaii on May 29 by plane and rejoined E Company at Camp Tarawa. PFC Gagnon and PhM2c. Bradley finished the tour in Washington, D.C., on July 4. The bond tour was held in 33 American cities that raised over $26 billion to help pay for and win the war.

On June 19, PFC Hayes was promoted to corporal. He served on occupation duty in Japan with E Company, 2nd Battalion, 28th Marines from September 22 to October 26, 1945. He was honorably discharged from the Marine Corps at Camp Pendleton, California, on December 1, 1945. On February 21, 1946, Hayes was awarded a Navy Commendation from the Marine Corps for meritorious service in combat during World War II.

== Post World War II ==
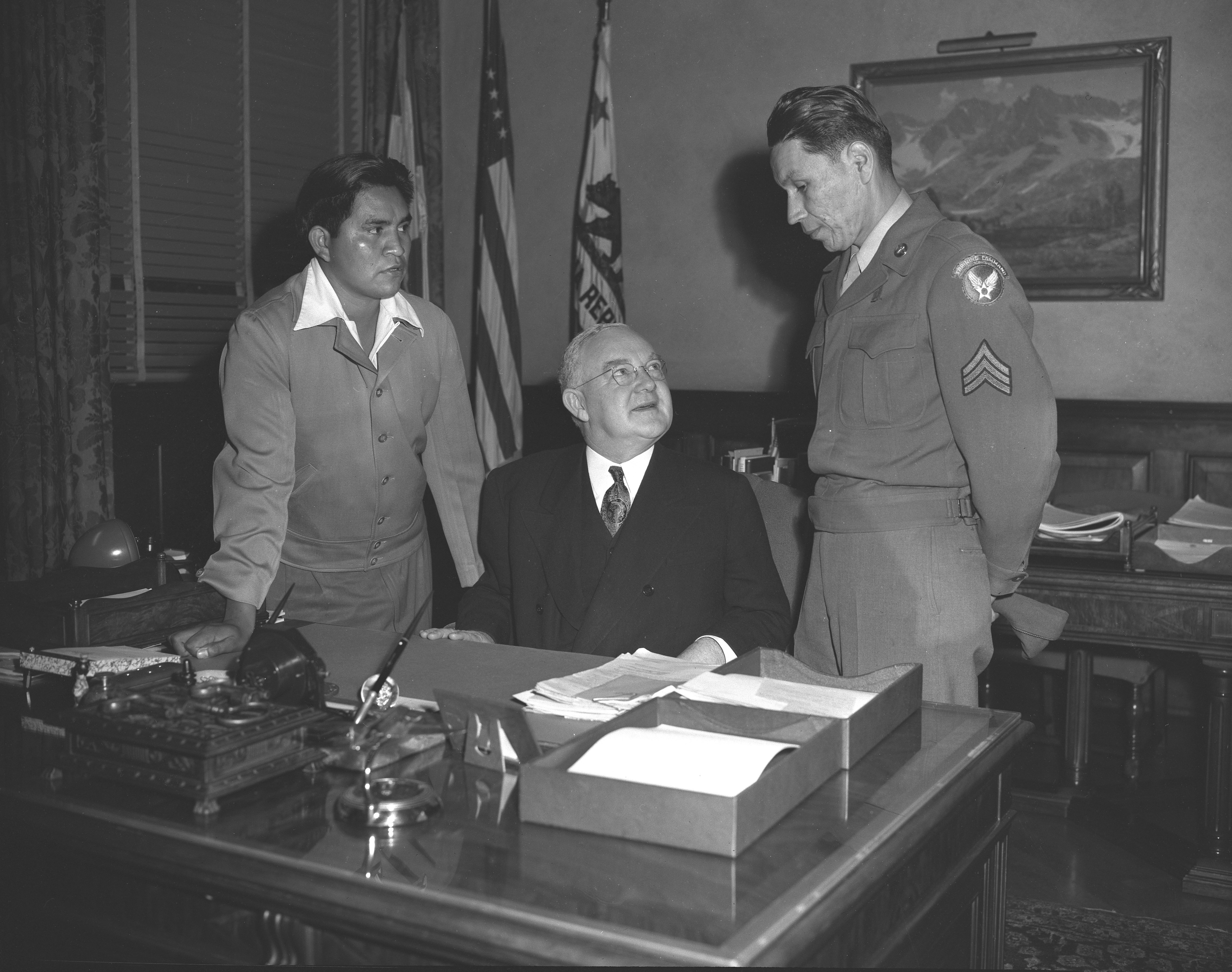
Hayes (left) with Los Angeles mayor Fletcher Bowron in 1947

Hayes attempted to lead a normal civilian life after the war. "I kept getting hundreds of letters. And people would drive through the reservation, walk up to me and ask, 'Are you the Indian who raised the flag on Iwo Jima?'" Although Hayes rarely spoke about the flag raising, he talked more generally about his service in the Marine Corps with great pride.

Hayes seemed to be disturbed that Harlon Block was still being misrepresented publicly as "Hank" Hansen. In May 1946, Hayes walked and hitchhiked 1,300 miles from the Gila River Indian Community in Arizona to the farm of Edward Frederick Block, Sr., in Weslaco, Texas, to reveal the truth to Block's parents about their son Harlon being in Rosenthal's flag raising photograph. He was instrumental in having the mistaken second flag-raiser controversy resolved by the Marine Corps in January 1947. Block's family, especially his mother, was grateful to Hayes. She said that she had known from the time she first saw the famous picture in the newspaper that it was her son in the photo. Mrs. Block wrote Hayes about her son and he wrote her back in July 1946. She then contacted Texas Congressman Milton West about Hayes' letter which started a Marine Corps investigation in December.

John "Jack" Thurman, who appears at the far left of Rosenthal's "Gung Ho" photograph (below, right) recounted a story of his friendship with Ira who was at the far left of the photo next to Jack. Jack recounted at a breakfast meeting that, sometime after the war, Ira hitchhiked across the country to visit him at his home farm in Mitchell, South Dakota. Ira arrived while Jack was away from the farm and Jack's mother would not allow Ira to wait at the house and made him wait at the end of the driveway by the road. Jack noted his mother "did not like Indians". Once all was explained when Jack got home, Ira was welcomed into the house. Jack remained friends with Ira until his death.

In 1949, Hayes appeared briefly as himself in the film Sands of Iwo Jima, starring John Wayne. In the movie, Wayne hands the American flag to Gagnon, Hayes, and Bradley, who at the time were considered the three surviving second flag-raisers (the second flag that was raised on Mount Suribachi is used in the film and is handed directly to Gagnon).

After this Hayes was unable to hold onto a steady job for a long period, as he had become an alcoholic. He was arrested 52 times for alcohol intoxication in public at various places in the country, including Chicago in October 1953. Hayes held a variety of jobs, including being a chauffeur to Elizabeth Martin, former wife of Dean Martin, where he lived in her Beverly Hills home for several months but couldn't stop drinking. Referring to his alcoholism, he once said: "I was sick. I guess I was about to crack up thinking about all my good buddies. They were better men than me and they're not coming back. Much less back to the White House, like me." Hayes was sober while attending the Marine Corps War Memorial dedication on November 10, 1954. Hayes met President Dwight D. Eisenhower who lauded him as a hero. A reporter there approached Hayes and asked him, "How do you like the pomp and circumstance?" Hayes hung his head and said, "I don't."

His disquiet about his unwanted fame and his subsequent post-war problems were first recounted in detail by the author William Bradford Huie in "The Outsider", published in 1959 as part of his collection Wolf Whistle and Other Stories. The Outsider, filmed in 1961, was directed by World War II veteran turned film director Delbert Mann and starred Tony Curtis as Hayes. The 2006 film Flags of Our Fathers, directed by Clint Eastwood, suggests that Hayes suffered from post-traumatic stress disorder (PTSD).

== Death ==
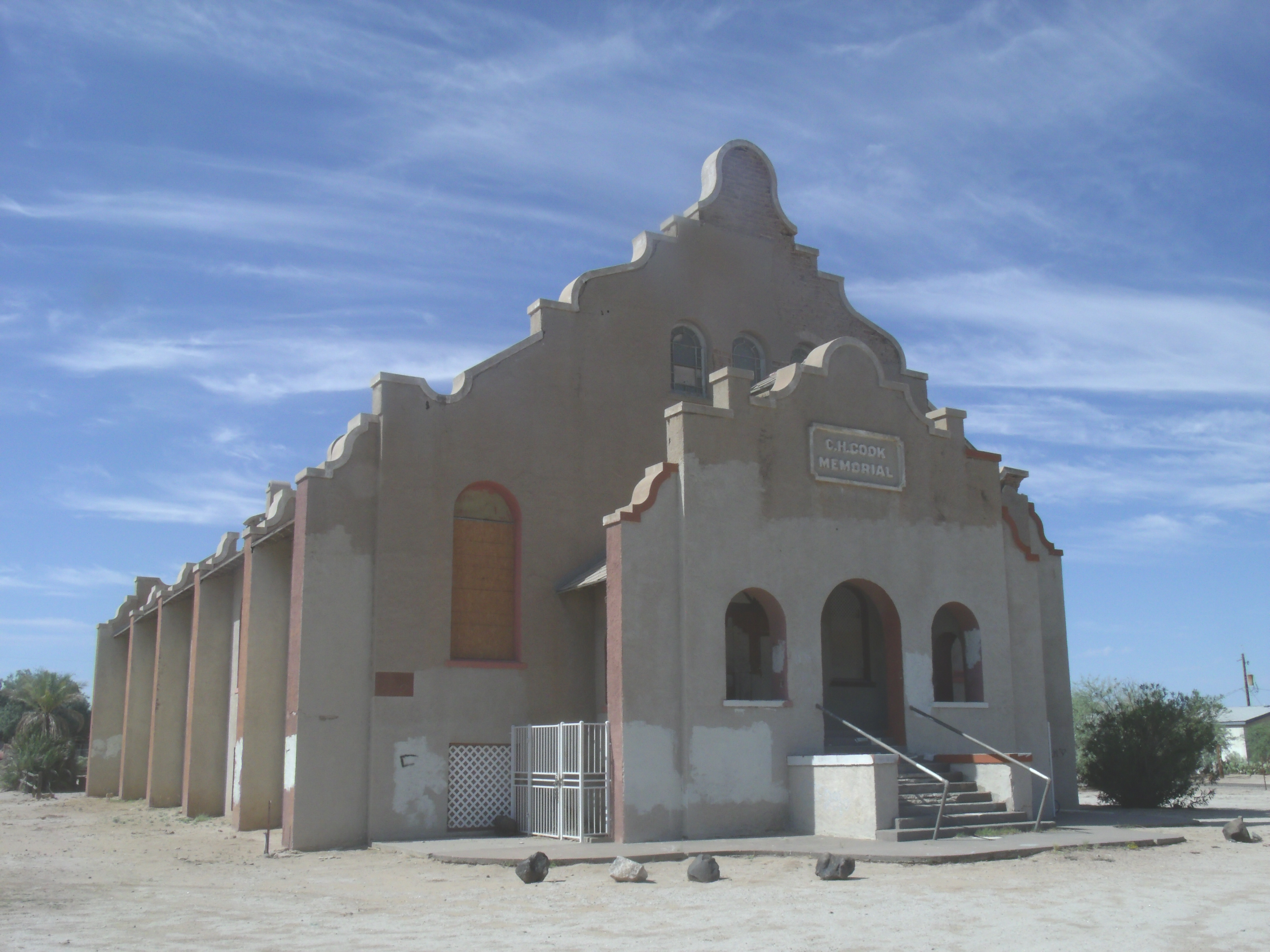
Hayes' funeral was held in the C.H. Cook Memorial Church in Sacaton, Arizona.

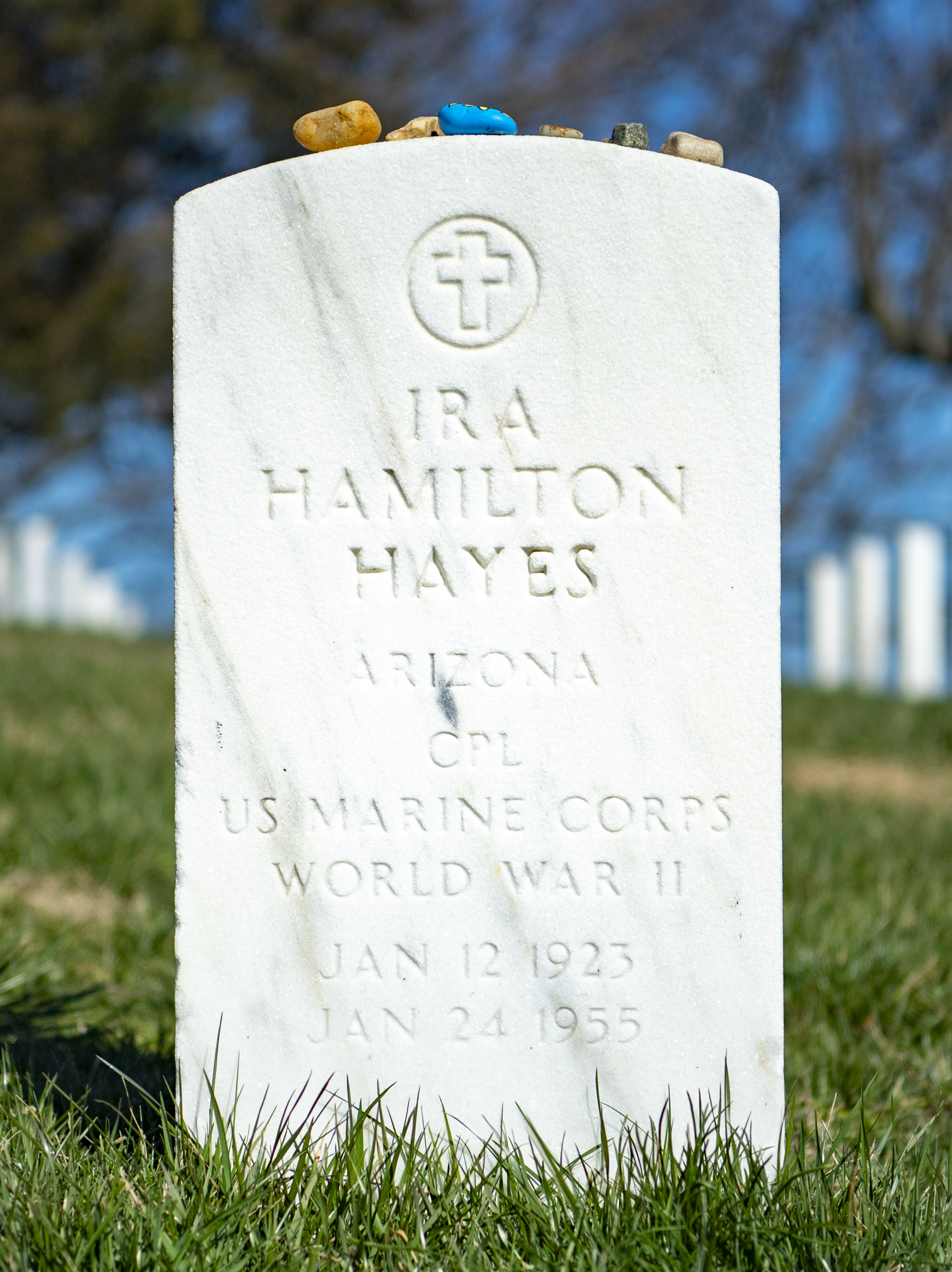
Grave at Arlington National Cemetery

On the morning of January 24, 1955, Hayes was found dead lying near an abandoned adobe hut near where he lived in Sacaton, Arizona. He had been drinking and playing cards on the reservation with his friends and brothers Vernon and Kenneth. An altercation ensued between Hayes and a Pima Indian named Henry Setoyant, and all left except Hayes and Setoyant. The Pinal County coroner concluded that Hayes's death was caused by exposure and alcohol poisoning. However, his brother Kenneth, a Korean War veteran, believed that the death resulted from the altercation with Setoyant. The reservation police did not conduct an investigation into Hayes's death, and Setoyant denied any allegations of fighting with Hayes. There was no autopsy.

In the film The Outsider, his death is dramatized for the screen. He is shown drunk and freezing on a mountain top and unable to climb down. He falls asleep and is shown frozen to death with his arm and hand reaching upwards, like the time he raised the flag on Mount Suribachi. In the song "The Ballad of Ira Hayes", he was described as being drunk and drowning in two inches of water in a ditch, not noting the cold.

On February 2, 1955, Hayes was buried in Section 34, Grave 479A at Arlington National Cemetery. At the funeral, Rene Gagnon (incorrectly thought to be a flag raiser until 2019, when it was correctly identified as Harold Keller) said of him: "Let's say he had a little dream in his heart that someday the Indian would be like the white man — be able to walk all over the United States."

== Marine Corps War Memorial ==
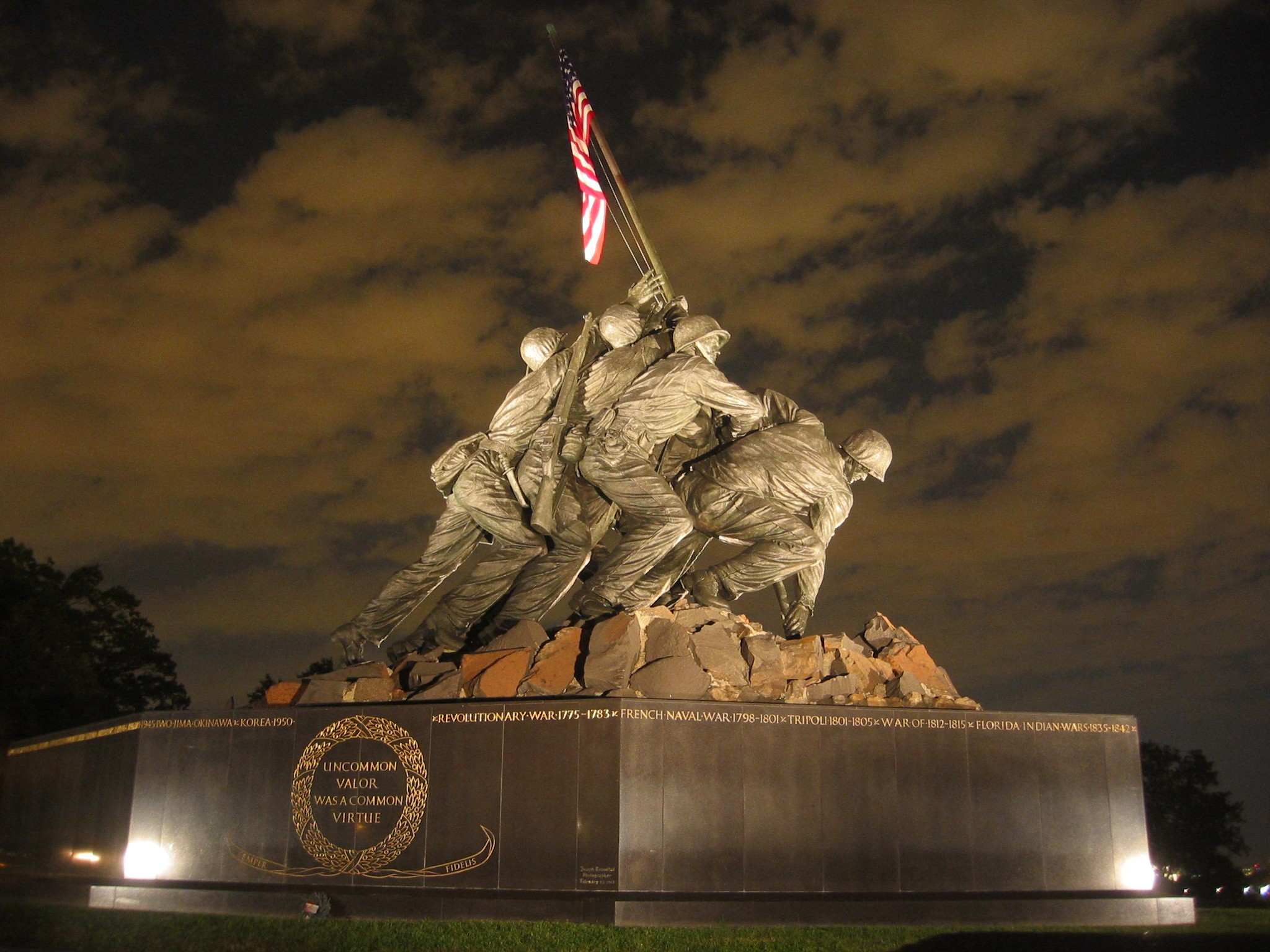
The U.S. Marine Corps War Memorial in Arlington County, Virginia

The Marine Corps War Memorial (Iwo Jima Memorial) in Arlington County, Virginia, was dedicated on November 10, 1954. The monument was sculpted by Felix de Weldon from the image of the second flag raising on Mount Suribachi. Ira Hayes is depicted as the sixth bronze figure from the base of the flagstaff on the memorial with the 32 foot (9.8 M) bronze figures of the other five flag-raisers depicted on the memorial.

President Dwight D. Eisenhower sat upfront during the dedication ceremony with Vice President Richard Nixon, Secretary of Defense Charles E. Wilson, Deputy Secretary of Defense Robert Anderson, and General Lemuel C. Shepherd, the 20th Commandant of the Marine Corps. Hayes, one of the three surviving flag raisers depicted on the monument, was also seated upfront with John Bradley (incorrectly identified as a flag raiser until June 23, 2016), Rene Gagnon (incorrectly identified as a flag raiser until October 16, 2019), Mrs. Martha Strank, Mrs. Ada Belle Block, and Mrs. Goldie Price (mother of Franklin Sousley). Those giving remarks at the dedication included Robert Anderson, Chairman of Day, Colonel J.W. Moreau, U.S. Marine Corps (Retired), President, Marine Corps War Memorial Foundation, General Shepherd who presented the memorial to the American people, Felix de Weldon, and Richard Nixon who gave the dedication address. Inscribed on the memorial are the following words:

In Honor And Memory Of The Men of The United States Marine Corps Who Have Given Their Lives To Their Country Since 10 November 1775

=== 1993 Marine Corps commemoration ===
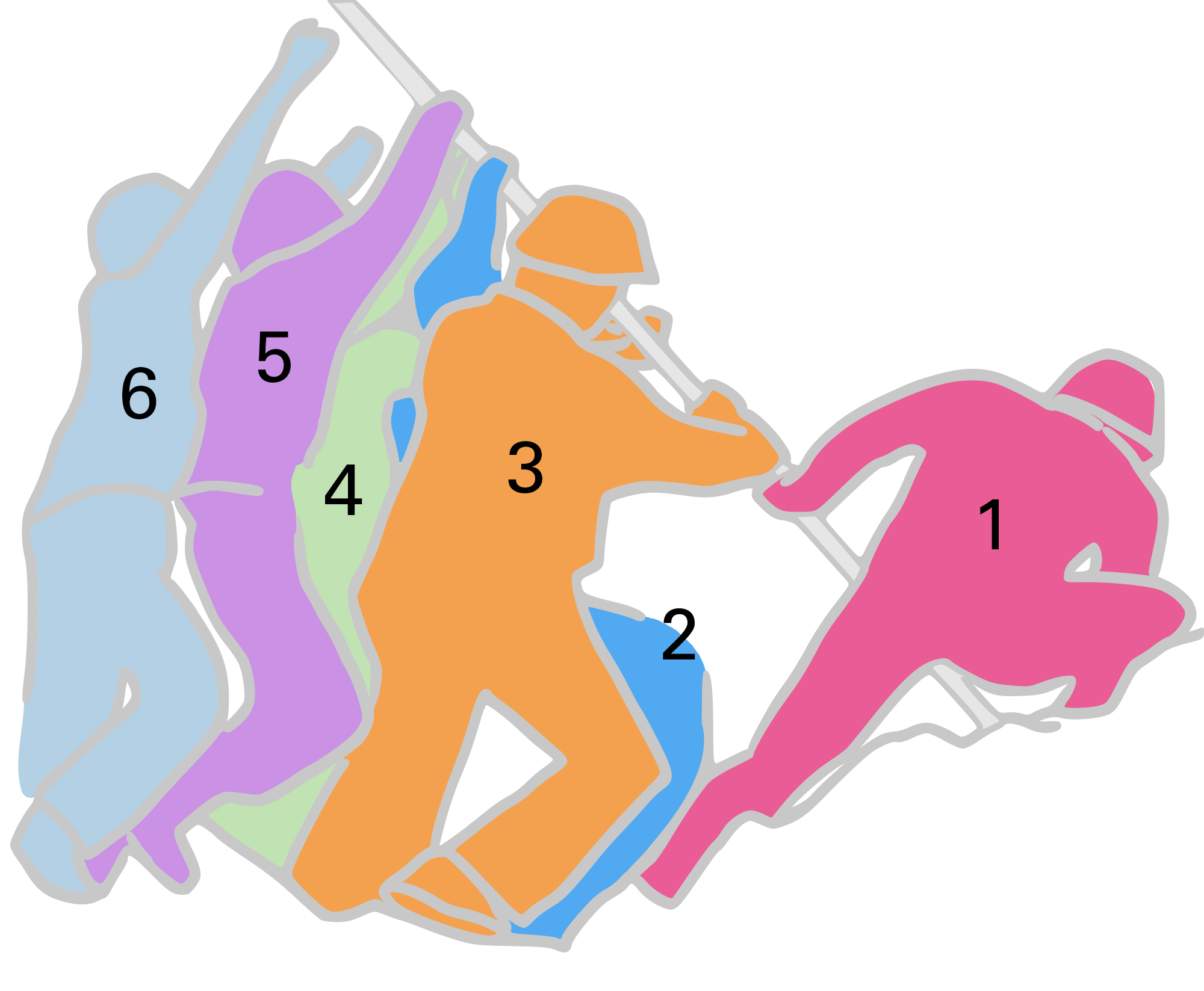
The six second flag-raisers: #1, Cpl. Harlon Block (KIA) #2, Pfc. Harold Keller #3, Pfc. Franklin Sousley (KIA) #4, Sgt. Michael Strank (KIA) #5, Pfc. Harold Schultz #6, Pfc. Ira Hayes

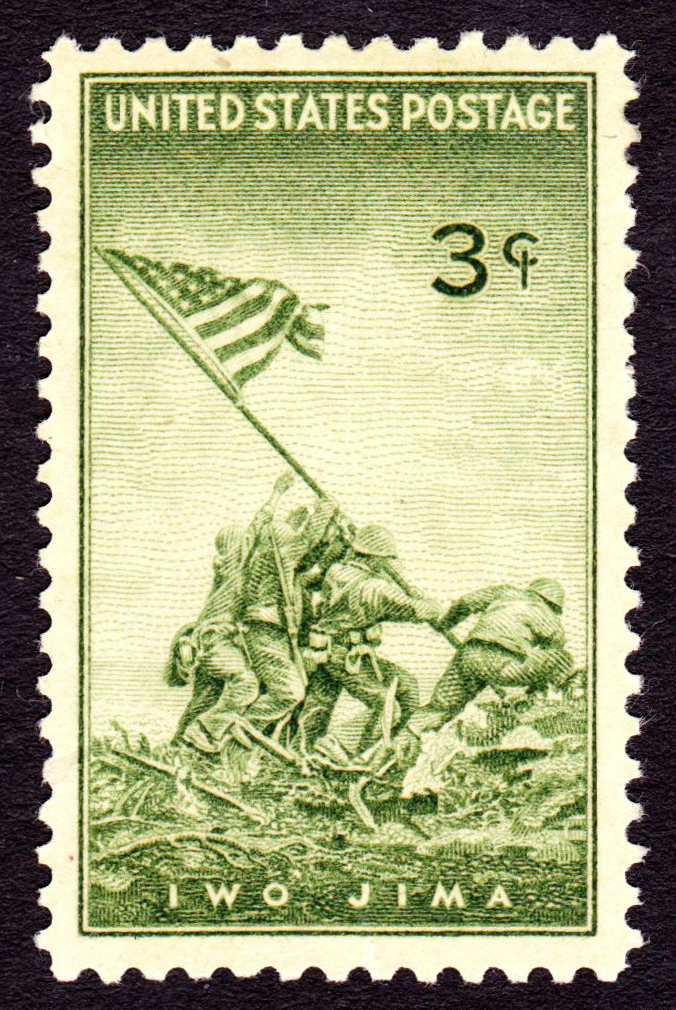
The U.S Post Office issued a commemorative stamp on July 11, 1945 celebrating the men atop Iwo Jima

On November 10, 1993, the United States Marine Corps held a ceremony at the Marine Corps War Memorial in Arlington County., Virginia, commemorating the 218th anniversary of the Marine Corps. Of Ira Hayes, USMC Commandant General Carl Mundy said:

One of the pairs of hands that you see outstretched to raise our National flag on the battle-scarred crest of Mount Suribachi so many years ago, are those of a Native American ... Ira Hayes ... a Marine not of the ethnic majority of our population.

Were Ira Hayes here today ... I would tell him that although my words on another occasion have given the impression that I believe some Marines ... because of their color ... are not as capable as other Marines ... that those were not the thoughts of my mind ... and that they are not the thoughts of my heart.

I would tell Ira Hayes that our Corps is what we are because we are of the people of America ... the people of the broad, strong, ethnic fabric that is our nation. And last, I would tell him that in the future, that fabric will broaden and strengthen in every category to make our Corps even stronger ... even of greater utility to our nation. That's a commitment of this commandant ... And that's a personal commitment of this Marine.

== Military awards ==
Hayes' Navy Commendation Ribbon was updated to the Navy and Marine Corps Commendation Medal with Combat "V" for meritorious service. He rates the Navy Combat Action Ribbon for combat participation in World War II. The 5/16" silver star on his Navy Presidential Unit Citation ribbon was a Marine Corps, World War II, campaign participation star (discontinued) for Iwo Jima, not a second Presidential Unit Citation award (3/16" bronze star). Hayes did not meet the Marine Corps four-year (48 months) service requirement in World War II for the Marine Corps Good Conduct Medal.

Hayes' military decorations and awards:

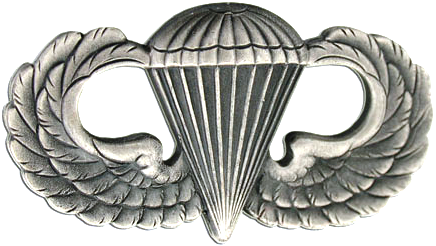
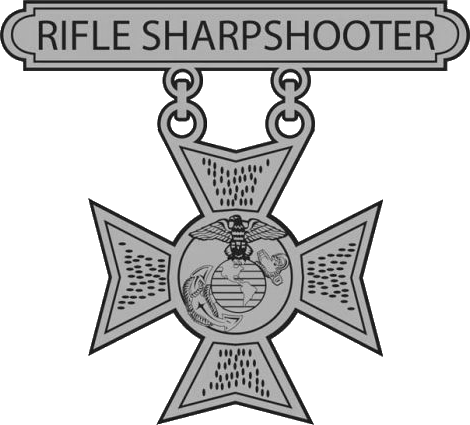

Badge	Parachutist Badge		
1st row	Navy and Marine Corps Commendation Medal with Combat "V"		
2nd row	Navy Combat Action Ribbon	Navy Presidential Unit Citation with 1 5/16" silver star	American Campaign Medal
3rd row	Asiatic-Pacific Campaign Medal with 4 bronze campaign stars	World War II Victory Medal	Navy Occupation Service Medal
Badge	Rifle Sharpshooter Badge		

=== U.S. Marine Corps Commendation ===
HEADQUARTERS

FLEET MARINE FORCE, PACIFIC
The Commanding General, Fleet Marine Force, Pacific, takes pleasure in COMMENDING, CORPORAL IRA H. HAYES, UNITED STATES MARINE CORPS, for service as set forth in the following

CITATION:

For meritorious and efficient performance of duty while serving with a Marine infantry battalion during operations against the enemy on VELLA LAVELLA AND BOUGAINVILLE, BRITISH SOLOMON ISLANDS, from 15 August to 15 December 1943, and on IWO JIMA, VOLCANO ISLANDS, from 19 February to 27 March 1945. Although often under heavy enemy fire, Corporal HAYES carried out his duties during all these campaigns in a highly commendable manner. Regardless of danger of personal fatigue he worked tirelessly, and his efforts greatly aided his unit in accomplishing its assigned missions. His courage, initiative, and loyal devotion to duty continually set an example for all who served with him, and his conduct throughout was in keeping with the highest traditions of the United States Naval Service.

/S/ Roy S. Geiger,
Lt. General, U.S. Marine Corps

Commendation Ribbon Authorized

== Portrayal in music, film and literature ==
Hayes's story was immortalized in the song "The Ballad of Ira Hayes" by Peter LaFarge, which was subsequently covered by numerous artists including Johnny Cash, Kris Kristofferson, Pete Seeger, Townes Van Zandt, and Bob Dylan. In 1964, Cash took the song to number 3 on the Billboard country music chart.

Ira Hayes is the subject of the song, "Blinding Flashes" written by The Rumjacks.

Ira Hayes appeared as himself in the 1949 John Wayne film, Sands of Iwo Jima. In the 1960 telefilm The American, he was played by World War II Marine veteran Lee Marvin. Tony Curtis played Hayes in the 1961 film The Outsider. Hayes was portrayed by Adam Beach in the 2006 movie Flags of Our Fathers, directed by Clint Eastwood. The movie was based on the 2000 bestselling book of the same name by James Bradley and Ron Powers.

The poet Ai dedicates her poem "I Can't Get Started" to Hayes. He is mentioned in the poem "Petroglyphs of Serena" by Adrian C. Louis. Hayes was also mentioned briefly in the book Code Talker by Joseph Bruchac and was mentioned multiple times in the book Indian Killer by Sherman Alexie.

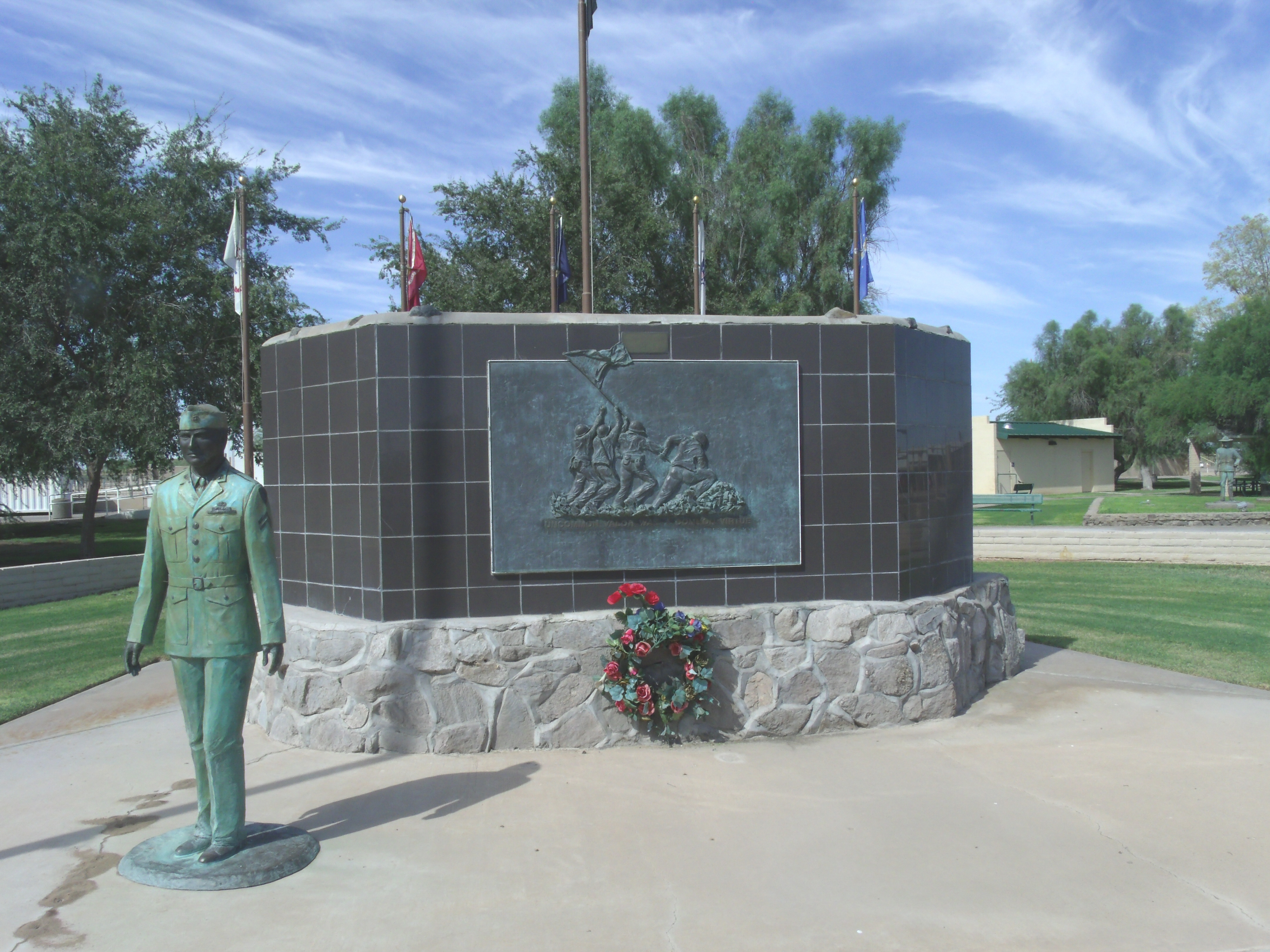
The Ira H. Hayes Monument located in the Mathew B. Juan–Ira H. Hayes Veterans Memorial Park in Sacaton, Arizona

== Monuments, memorials, and namings ==
Ira Hayes' personal honors include:

- Marine Corps War Memorial (Marine flag raising figure), Arlington County, Virginia.
- Hayes Peak, the northernmost and highest mountain in the Sierra Estrella, Phoenix, Arizona.
- Ira H. Hayes High School, Bapchule, Arizona
- Ira Hayes Park (statue), Sacaton, Arizona.
- Marine Corps League, Ira Hayes Detachment 2, Phoenix, Arizona.
- American Legion, Ira Hayes Post 84, Sacaton, Arizona.

In March 2025, The Department of Defense took down a web page about Hayes "amid the Trump administration’s wide-ranging crackdown on what it says are 'diversity, equity and inclusion' efforts in the federal government."

== See also ==
- List of deaths through alcohol
- Native Americans and World War II
- PTSD
- Raising the Flag on Iwo Jima
- Shadow of Suribachi: Raising The Flags on Iwo Jima
- Survivor guilt
- Anti-DEI deletions by the U.S. Department of Defense
