= Bapchule, Arizona =

Community in Pinal County, Arizona

- Unincorporated Community
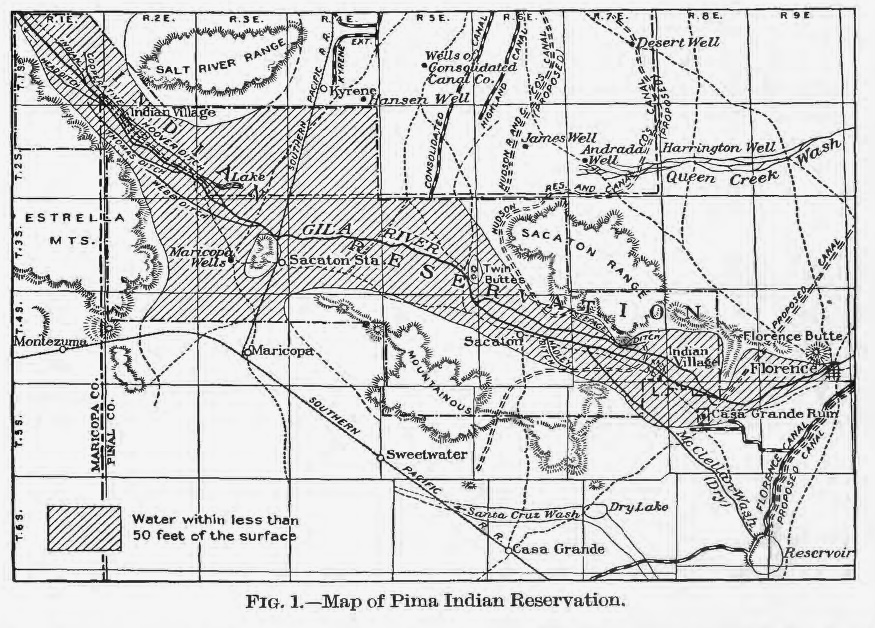
- 1904 map of what is now Gila River Indian Community

- U.S. State of Arizona Bapchule, Arizona (the United States)
- Coordinates: 33.13644°N 111.87319°W
- Country: United States
- State: Arizona
- County: Pinal County
- Elevation: 365 m (1,198 ft)
- Time zone: UTC-7 (MST)
- ZIP code: 85121
- GNIS feature ID: 1006

Bapchule (O'odham language: Pi:pchul) is an unincorporated community in Pinal and Maricopa counties, Arizona, United States. Although Bapchule is unincorporated, it has a post office (P.O. Boxes only) with the ZIP code of 85121.

It lies in the Gila River Indian Community, south of the Phoenix Metropolitan Area. Most of Bapchule is located in Pinal County, while a portion of it in the north is in Maricopa County. The Bapchule locality is geographically situated at a southern coordinate to the Gila River Valley.

== History ==
The Juan Bautista de Anza National Historic Trail encompasses the Maricopa and Pinal counties within the central southern geography of Arizona.

Bapchule is the location of the 1955 death of Ira Hayes, renowned for his heroism at the Battle of Iwo Jima during World War II. He was one of the Marines in the famous picture Raising the American Flag on Mount Suribachi.

Bapchule's population was estimated as 100 in the 1960 United States census.

== Climate ==
This area has a large amount of sunshine year round due to its stable descending air and high pressure. According to the Köppen Climate Classification system, Bapchule has a desert climate, abbreviated "BWh" on climate maps.
