= Indigenous languages of Arizona =

Arizona, a state in the southwestern region of the United States of America, is known for its high population of Native Americans. Arizona has the third highest number (and the sixth highest percentage) of Native Americans of any state in the Union (See Demographics of Arizona). Out of the entire US population of 2.9 million Native Americans, roughly 286,680 live in Arizona, representing 10% of the country's total Native American population. Only California and Oklahoma have more Native Americans than Arizona by number. Arizona also has the highest proportion of land allocated to Native American reservations, at 28%. Arizona has five of the twelve largest Indian reservations in the United States, including the largest, the Navajo Nation, and the third-largest, the Tohono O'odham Nation. Also, Arizona has the largest number of Native American language speakers in the United States.

== Distribution ==
There are twelve Native American languages spoken in Arizona, in addition to three other languages that are primarily spoken outside the state and one language with a disputed existence.

Population estimates are based on figures from Ethnologue and U.S. Census data, as given in sub-pages below. The twelve languages are shown in the table below:

Language	Classification	Number of speakers	Total ethnic population	Tribe(s) included	Location(s) in Arizona	Significant external populations
Navajo	Na-Dene: Southern Athabaskan	170,000	300,000	Navajo	Navajo Nation	New Mexico
Western Apache	Na-Dene: Southern Athabaskan	13,000	20,000	White Mountain Apache, San Carlos Apache, Tonto Apache	Fort Apache Indian Reservation, San Carlos Apache Indian Reservation, Yavapai-Apache Nation, Fort McDowell Yavapai Nation, Tonto Apache Tribecall/Tonto Apache Indian Reservation	
Yavapai	Yuman: Pai	163	1,420	Yavapai	Fort McDowell Yavapai Nation, Yavapai-Apache Nation, Yavapai-Prescott Tribe	
Havasupai-Hualapai	Yuman: Pai	1,530	2,437	Havasupai, Hualapai	Havasupai Indian Reservation, Hualapai Indian Reservation	
Quechan/Yuma	Yuman: River	250	1,200	Quechan	Fort Yuma Indian Reservation	California
Mojave	Yuman: River	100	750	Mohave	Fort Mojave Indian Reservation, Colorado River Indian Reservation	California
Maricopa	Yuman: River	160	400	Maricopa	Salt River Pima-Maricopa Indian Community, Gila River Indian Reservation (Maricopa Colony)	
Cocopah	Yuman: Delta	400	1,000	Cocopah	Cocopah Indian Reservation	Mexico (Baja California, Sonora)
Hopi	Uto-Aztecan: Northern: Hopi	5,000	18,000	Hopi	Hopi Indian Reservation	
Colorado River Numic	Uto-Aztecan: Northern: Numic	2,000	5,000	Chemehuevi, Southern Paiute, Ute	San Juan Southern Paiute Tribe of Arizona, Kaibab Indian Reservation, Colorado River Indian Reservation	Nevada, Utah, Colorado, California
O'odham	Uto-Aztecan: Southern: Piman	10,000	20,000	Akimel O'odham/Pima, Tohono O'odham/Papago	Tohono O'odham Nation, Ak-Chin Indian Community, Gila River Indian Community, Salt River Pima-Maricopa Indian Community	Sonora
Yaqui	Uto-Aztecan: Southern: Taracahitic	15,000	25,000	Yaqui people	Pascua Yaqui Indian Reservation, Guadalupe	Sonora (Yaqui River Valley)
Halchidhoma	Yuman	?		Halchidhoma		

== Other minority Native American languages ==
In addition to the languages listed in the table above, there are three other Native American languages spoken in Arizona that are primarily found in New Mexico, located immediately to the east:

- Zuni is a language isolate spoken primarily in the Zuni Pueblo, which is located in northern New Mexico. Out of the approximately 10,000 people that form the Zuni tribe, only 538 live in Arizona, located on trust lands in Apache County. Unlike many other Native American languages, a vast majority of Zuni are able to speak their language, and Zuni is at a comparatively lower risk of extinction.
- Tewa is a Tanoan language spoken by the Tewa people of New Mexico. The Arizona Tewa are a group of Tewa that currently reside on the Hopi reservation of northeastern Arizona, primarily in two villages around First Mesa: Hano and Polacca. The Tewa language is considered endangered.
- Mescalero-Chiricahua is a Southern Athabaskan language spoken by the Chiricahua people and Mescalero people, two Apachean tribes that currently reside on the Fort Sill Apache Tribe lands in Oklahoma and the Mescalero Indian Reservation in southwestern New Mexico. A few Chiricahua also live on the San Carlos Apache Indian Reservation in southeastern Arizona, but this language is a minority language on the reservation.

== See also ==
- Native Americans in the United States
- Indigenous peoples of Arizona
- Indigenous languages of the Americas
- Uto-Aztecan languages
- Yuman languages
- Southern Athabaskan languages
