= Maricopa =

Maricopa can refer to:

== Places ==
- Maricopa, Arizona, United States, a city in Pinal County, Arizona
  - Maricopa Freeway, a section of I-10 in Metropolitan Phoenix
  - Maricopa station, an Amtrak station in Maricopa, Arizona
- Maricopa County, Arizona, United States
- Maricopa, California, United States, a rural city in Kern County, California

== Other uses ==
- Maricopa people, a Native American ethnic group
- Maricopa language, a language spoken by the Maricopa people
- Maricopa (moth), a genus of insects
- Maricopa Community Colleges, a system of 10 community colleges
