= Demographics of Arizona =

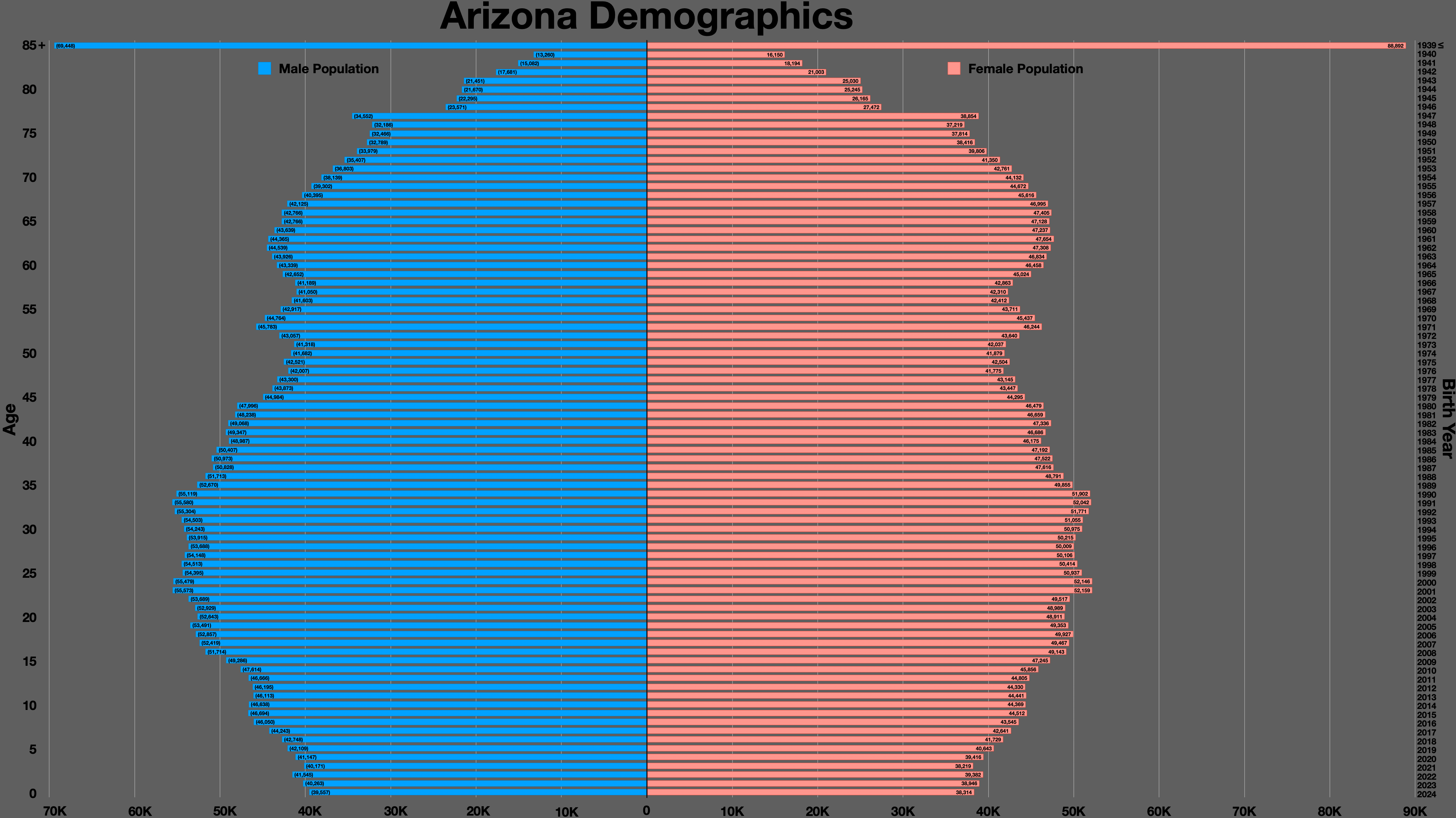
Arizona population pyramid

Historical population
Census	Pop.	Note	%±
1860	6,482		—
1870	9,658		49.0%
1880	40,440		318.7%
1890	88,243		118.2%
1900	122,931		39.3%
1910	204,354		66.2%
1920	334,162		63.5%
1930	435,573		30.3%
1940	499,261		14.6%
1950	749,587		50.1%
1960	1,302,161		73.7%
1970	1,745,900		34.1%
1980	2,718,215		55.7%
1990	3,665,228		34.8%
2000	5,130,632		40.0%
2010	6,392,017		24.6%
2020	7,151,502		11.9%
2025 (est.)	7,623,818		6.6%
Sources: 1910–2020, 2025; Note that early censuses may not include Native Americans in Arizona

As of the July 1, 2026, United States census estimate, Arizona has a population of 7,623,818.

A past census found that the population had seen a natural increase since the last census of 297,928 people (that is 564,062 births minus 266,134 deaths) and an increase due to net migration of 745,944 people into the state. Immigration from outside the United States resulted in a net increase of 204,661 people, and migration within the country produced a net increase of 541,283 people. New population figures for the year ending July 1, 2006, indicate that Arizona is the fastest growing state in the United States, with 3.6% population growth since 2005, exceeding the growth of the previous leader, Nevada.

The population density of the state, as of 2020, was 62.9 people per square mile (24.3 people per kilometer^{2}), while using 2026 data, it is 66.9 people per square mile (25.83 people per kilometer^{2}). As of 2020, the population of illegal immigrants was estimated to be between 250,000 and over 280,000 according to some sources These constituted an estimated 3.5% of the population.

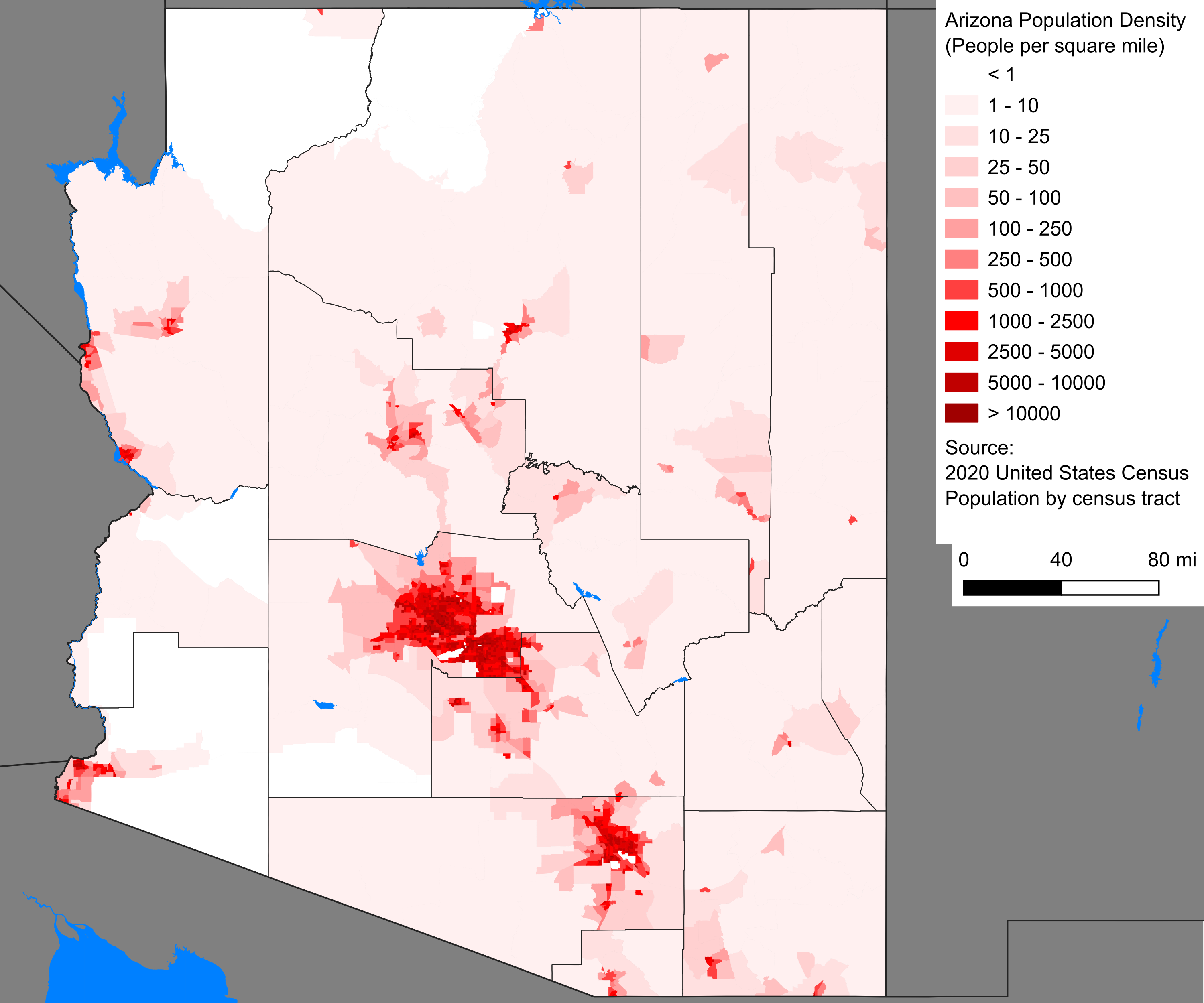
Arizona's population density.

The center of population of Arizona is located in Maricopa County, which contains over 61% of Arizona's population.

== Ancestry ==
=== 2020 census ===
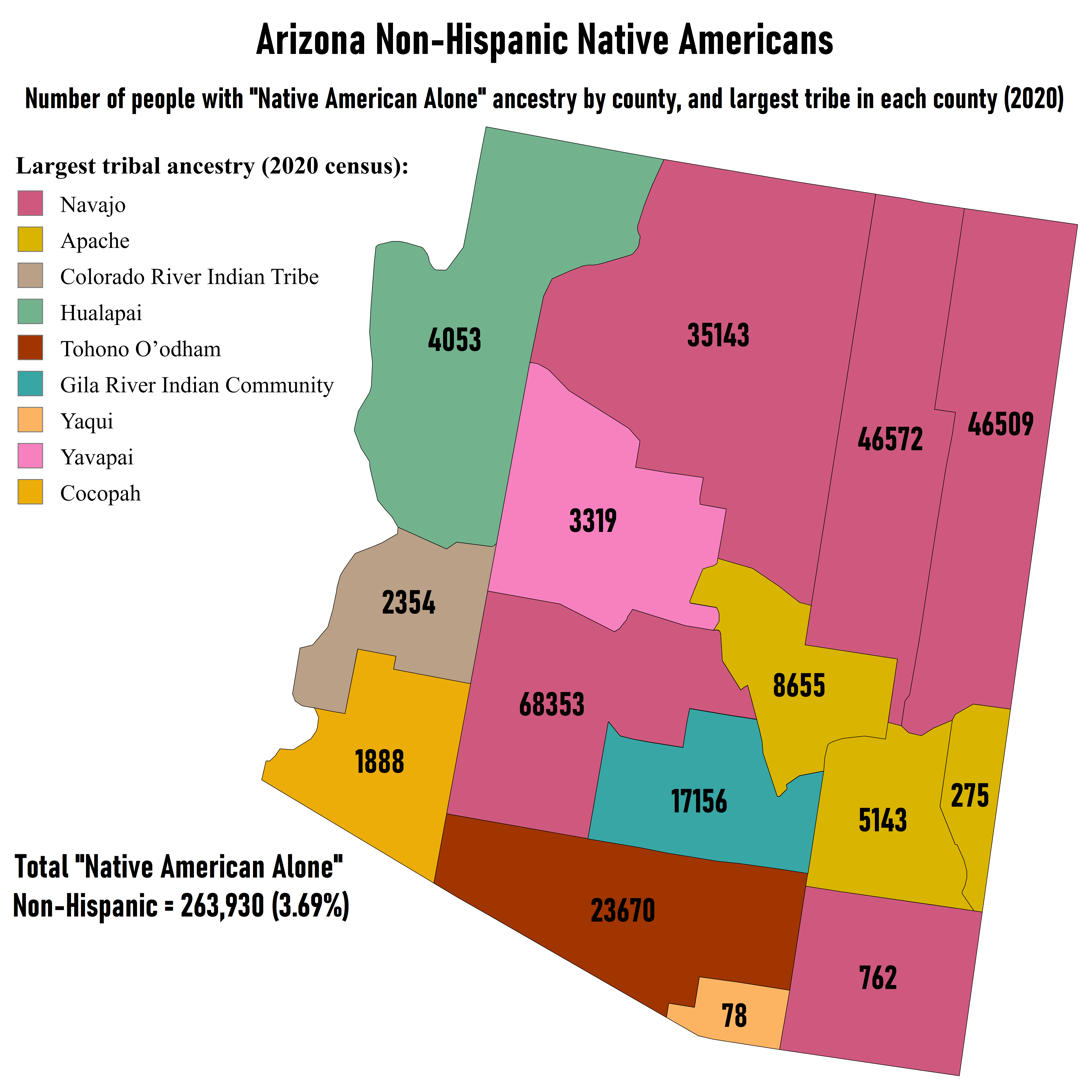
Largest Non-Hispanic Native American ancestry by county and numbers of people reporting "Native American Alone"

According to the 2020 census, the racial make up of Arizona was 53.4% Non-Hispanic White, 4.7% African American, 4.5% Native American, 3.6% Asian, .2% Pacific Islander. The State was 30.7% Hispanic or Latino.

=== Racial and ethnic composition ===
Arizona – Racial and ethnic composition Note: the US Census treats Hispanic/Latino as an ethnic category. This table excludes Latinos from the racial categories and assigns them to a separate category. Hispanics/Latinos may be of any race.
Race / Ethnicity (NH = Non-Hispanic)	1980	1990	Pop 2000	Pop 2010	Pop 2020	% 1980	% 1990	% 2000	% 2010	% 2020
White alone (NH)	2,026,262	2,626,185	3,274,258	3,695,647	3,816,547	74.54%	71.65%	63.82%	57.82%	53.37%
Black or African American alone (NH)	73,245	104,809	149,941	239,101	317,161	2.69%	2.86%	2.92%	3.74%	4.43%
Native American or Alaska Native alone (NH)	152,342	190,091	233,370	257,426	263,930	5.60%	5.19%	4.55%	4.03%	3.69%
Asian alone (NH)	21,886	51,530	89,315	170,509	248,837	0.81%	1.41%	1.74%	2.67%	3.48%
Native Hawaiian or Pacific Islander alone (NH)	x	x	5,639	10,959	14,323	x	x	0.11%	0.17%	0.20%
Other race alone (NH)	3,779	4,275	6,120	8,595	31,611	0.14%	0.12%	0.12%	0.13%	0.44%
Mixed race or Multiracial (NH)	x	x	76,372	114,631	266,840	x	x	1.49%	1.79%	3.73%
Hispanic or Latino (any race)	440,701	688,338	1,295,617	1,895,149	2,192,253	16.21%	18.78%	25.25%	29.65%	30.65%
Total	2,718,215	3,665,228	5,130,632	6,392,017	7,151,502	100.00%	100.00%	100.00%	100.00%	100.00%

==== 2025 American Community Survey one-year estimates ====
Racial Makeup of Arizona (2025): 1. White alone (58.1%); 2. Black alone (4.90%); 3. Native American alone (4.20%); 4. Asian Alone (4.11%); 5. Pacific Islander Alone (0.22%); 6. Other race alone (9.58%); 7. Two or more races (18.9%)	Racial/Ethnic Makeup of Arizona excluding Hispanics from racial categories (2025); NH=Non-Hispanic: 1. White NH (50.1%); 2. Black NH (4.54%); 3. Native American NH (3.37%); 4. Asian NH (4.01%); 5. Pacific Islander NH (0.19%); 6. Other race NH (0.48%); 7. Two or more races NH (4.74%); 8. Hispanic Any Race (32.5%)	Racial Makeup of Hispanics in Arizona (2025): 1. White alone (24.3%); 2. Black alone (1.11%); 3. Native American alone (2.57%); 4. Asian Alone (0.32%); 5. Pacific Islander Alone (0.09%); 6. Other race alone (28.0%); 7. Two or more races (43.7%)

Demographics of Arizona (csv)
By race	White	Black	AIAN*	Asian	NHPI*
2000 (total population)	89.29%	3.74%	5.81%	2.36%	0.28%
2000 (Hispanic only)	24.13%	0.41%	0.73%	0.19%	0.07%
2005 (total population)	88.74%	4.20%	5.63%	2.75%	0.31%
2005 (Hispanic only)	27.20%	0.58%	0.72%	0.23%	0.08%
Growth 2000–05 (total population)	15.05%	30.11%	12.25%	35.27%	25.02%
Growth 2000–05 (non-Hispanic only)	9.32%	25.75%	11.85%	34.75%	22.33%
Growth 2000–05 (Hispanic only)	30.51%	65.92%	15.01%	41.10%	32.89%
* AIAN is American Indian or Alaskan Native; NHPI is Native Hawaiian or Pacific Islander

According to the 2005–2007 American Community Survey conducted by the U.S. Census Bureau, White Americans made up 76.4% of Arizona's population; of which 59.6% were Non-Hispanic Whites. Black people or African Americans made up 3.4% of Arizona's population; of which 3.3% were non-Hispanic black people. American Indians made up 4.5% of the state's population; of which 4.1% were non-Hispanic. Asian Americans made up 2.3% of the state's population. Pacific Islander Americans made up 0.1% of the state's population. Individuals from some other race made up 10.8% of the state's population; of which 0.2% were non-Hispanic. Individuals from two or more races made up 2.4% of the state's population; of which 1.4% were non-Hispanic. In addition, Hispanics and Latinos made up 29.0% of Arizona's population.

The state has the third-highest number (and the sixth-highest percentage) of Native Americans of any state in the Union. 286,680 were estimated to live in Arizona, representing more than 10% of the country's total Native American population of 2,752,158. Only California and Oklahoma have more Native Americans. The perimeters of Phoenix, Tucson, Prescott, Scottsdale, Flagstaff and Yuma border on Native American reservations.

The largest ancestry groups in Arizona are Mexican (25.8%), German (16.5%), English (10.3%), Irish (10.9%), and Native American (4.5%). The southern and central parts of the state are predominantly Mexican American, especially in Santa Cruz County and Yuma County near the Mexican border. The north-central and northwestern counties are largely inhabited by non-Hispanic White Americans. The northeastern part of Arizona has many American Indians. Asian Americans also made major contributions to the development of Arizona, such as the many Chinese who arrived in the state's mines and railroads, and the fact that over 20,000 Japanese Americans, mostly residing in the Grand Avenue section of Phoenix and farming areas of southern Arizona and the Colorado River valley, were interned during World War II. As of the 2010 US Census, Arizonans who claim Filipino ancestry exceed 53,000. Filipino Americans are also the largest Asian American subgroup in the state.

As of 2025, the U.S. Census Bureau reports that Arizona is composed mostly of individuals marking White alone, not including Hispanic or Latino, at 51.2%, with Hispanic or Latino individuals making up 32.5%, and White individuals, including Hispanic and non-Hispanic, at 78.5%.

== Vital statistics ==
Source: Centers for Disease Control and Prevention (CDC)

Year	Population	Live births	Deaths	Natural change	Crude birth rate (per 1,000)	Crude death rate (per 1,000)	Natural change (per 1,000)	Crude migration change (per 1,000)
1999	4,778,332	81,145	40,050	41,095	16.98	8.38	8.60	–6.22
2000	5,160,586	85,273	40,500	44,773	16.52	7.85	8.67	–0.67
2001	5,273,477	85,597	41,058	44,539	16.23	7.79	8.44	–6.25
2002	5,396,255	87,837	42,816	45,021	16.28	7.93	8.35	–6.02
2003	5,510,364	90,967	43,392	47,575	16.51	7.87	8.64	–6.53
2004	5,652,404	93,663	43,198	50,465	16.57	7.64	8.93	–6.35
2005	5,839,077	96,199	45,827	50,372	16.48	7.85	8.63	–5.33
2006	6,029,141	102,429	46,365	56,064	16.99	7.70	9.29	–6.03
2007	6,167,681	102,981	45,554	57,427	16.70	7.39	9.31	–7.01
2008	6,280,362	99,442	45,823	53,619	15.83	7.30	8.54	–6.71
2009	6,343,154	92,798	45,816	46,982	14.64	7.22	7.41	–6.41
2010	6,407,342	87,477	46,762	40,715	13.65	7.30	6.35	–5.34
2011	6,473,416	85,543	48,381	37,162	13.21	7.48	5.74	–4.71
2012	6,556,344	86,441	49,549	36,892	13.19	7.56	5.63	–4.35
2013	6,634,690	85,600	50,534	35,066	12.91	7.62	5.28	–4.09
2014	6,732,873	86,887	51,538	35,349	12.91	7.66	5.25	–3.77
2015	6,832,810	85,351	54,299	31,052	12.49	7.95	4.54	–3.06
2016	6,944,767	84,520	56,645	27,875	12.17	8.16	4.01	–2.37
2017	7,048,088	81,872	57,758	24,114	11.62	8.20	3.42	–1.93
2018	7,164,228	80,723	59,282	21,441	11.27	8.28	2.99	–1.34
2019	7,291,843	79,375	60,236	19,139	10.89	8.26	2.63	–0.85
2020	7,187,135	76,947	75,747	1,200	10.71	10.54	0.17	–1.61
2021	7,274,078	77,916	81,442	–3,526	10.71	11.20	–0.49	1.70
2022	7,377,566	78,547	74,082	4,465	10.64			
2023	7,473,027	78,096	69,335	8,761	10.45			
2024		78,711	70,469	8,242				
2025	7,623,818	78,637	70,887	7,750				

== Births data ==
Note: Births in the table don't add up, because Hispanics are counted both by their ethnicity and by their race, giving a higher overall number.

Live Births by Single Race/Ethnicity of Mother
Race	2014	2015	2016	2017	2018	2019	2020	2021	2022	2023	2024
White	38,608 (44.4%)	36,976 (43.3%)	35,244 (41.7%)	33,694 (41.2%)	32,805 (40.6%)	31,940 (40.2%)	30,854 (40.1%)	31,488 (40.4%)	30,499 (38.8%)	29,694 (38.0%)	29,340 (37.3%)
Black	5,208 (6.0%)	5,095 (6.0%)	4,075 (4.8%)	4,241 (5.2%)	4,305 (5.3%)	4,542 (5.7%)	4,389 (5.7%)	4,403 (5.6%)	4,425 (5.6%)	4,334 (5.5%)	4,427 (5.6%)
American Indian	5,473 (6.3%)	5,316 (6.2%)	4,516 (5.3%)	4,256 (5.2%)	4,155 (5.1%)	3,911 (4.9%)	3,551 (4.6%)	3,362 (4.3%)	3,436 (4.4%)	3,346 (4.3%)	3,199 (4.1%)
Asian	3,519 (4.1%)	3,518 (4.1%)	2,954 (3.5%)	2,987 (3.6%)	2,908 (3.6%)	2,827 (3.6%)	2,624 (3.4%)	2,592 (3.3%)	2,748 (3.5%)	2,855 (3.6%)	2,805 (3.5%)
Pacific Islander	...	...	215 (0.2%)	217 (0.3%)	248 (0.3%)	222 (0.3%)	203 (0.3%)	231 (0.3%)	205 (0.3%)	234 (0.3%)	230 (0.3%)
Hispanic (any race)	35,034 (40.3%)	35,247 (41.3%)	34,950 (41.3%)	34,377 (42.0%)	34,084 (42.2%)	33,639 (42.4%)	32,999 (42.9%)	33,475 (43.0%)	34,839 (44.4%)	35,183 (45.0%)	36,108 (45.8%)
Total	86,887 (100%)	85,351 (100%)	84,520 (100%)	81,872 (100%)	80,723 (100%)	79,375 (100%)	76,947 (100%)	77,916 (100%)	78,547 (100%)	78,096 (100%)	78,711 (100%)

- Since 2016, data for births of White Hispanic origin are not collected, but included in one Hispanic group; persons of Hispanic origin may be of any race.

== Income ==
See list of Arizona locations by per capita income.

== Languages ==
Top 10 non-English languages spoken in Arizona
Language	Percentage of population (as of 2010)
Spanish	20.8%
Navajo	1.5%
German	0.4%
Chinese (including Mandarin)	0.4%
Tagalog	0.3%
Vietnamese	0.3%
Other North American indigenous languages (especially indigenous languages of Arizona)	0.3%
French	0.3%
Arabic	0.2%
Apache	0.2%
Korean	0.2%

As of 2010, 72.9% (4,215,749) of Arizona residents age 5 and older spoke English at home as a primary language, while 20.8% (1,202,638) spoke Spanish, 1.5% (85,602) Navajo, 0.4% (22,592) German, 0.4% (22,426) Chinese (which includes Mandarin), 0.3% (19,015) Tagalog, 0.3% (17,603) Vietnamese, 0.3% (15,707) other North American indigenous languages (especially indigenous languages of Arizona), and French was spoken as a main language by 0.3% (15,062) of the population over the age of five. In total, 27.1% (1,567,548) of Arizona's population age 5 and older spoke a mother language other than English.

Arizona is home to the largest number of speakers of Native American languages in the 48 contiguous states. Arizona's Apache County has the highest concentration of speakers of Native American Indian languages in the United States.

See also the list of native peoples. See also the list of Indigenous languages of Arizona.

== Religion ==
Religion in Arizona (2014)
1. Protestantism (39.0%)
2. Roman Catholicism (21.0%)
3. Mormonism (5.00%)
4. Eastern Orthodoxy (0.50%)
5. Jehovah's Witnesses (1.00%)
6. Other Christian (0.50%)
7. No religion (27.0%)
8. Judaism (2.00%)
9. Islam (1.00%)
10. Buddhism (1.00%)
11. Hinduism (1.00%)
12. Other religion (1.00%)

According to the Association of Religion Data Archives, the fifteen largest denominations by number of adherents in 2010 and 2000 were:

Religion	2000 Population	2010 Population
Catholic Church	974,884	930,001
The Church of Jesus Christ of Latter-day Saints	251,974	392,918
Southern Baptist Convention	138,516	126,830
Assemblies of God	82,802	123,713
United Methodist Church	53,232	54,977
Christian Churches and Churches of Christ	33,162	48,386
Evangelical Lutheran Church in America	69,393	42,944
Lutheran Church–Missouri Synod	24,977	26,322
Presbyterian Church (U.S.A.)	33,554	26,078
Episcopal Church (United States)	24,853	31,104
Seventh-day Adventist Church	11,513	20,924
Church of the Nazarene	18,143	16,991
Lutheran Congregations in Mission for Christ	0	14,350
Churches of Christ	14,471	14,151
Non-denominational Christian	281,105	63,885 (Note: In 2000, this designation was broken into two groups: Independent, Non-Charismatic Churches (34,130 adherents) and Independent, Charismatic Churches (29,755 adherents))

Regarding non-Christian denominations, Hinduism became the largest non-Christian religion (when combining all denominations) in 2010, with over 32,000 adherents in several denominations, followed by Judaism with over 20,000 in three denominations, and Buddhism with over 19,000 adherents in several denominations.

== See also ==
- Constitution of Arizona
