= Ida Redbird =

Maricopa potter (1892–1971)

- Redbird in 1940, Sayles image, using a paddle to thin the wall of a pot she is creating
- Born: March 15, 1892; Laveen, Gila River Indian Reservation, Arizona
- Died: August 10, 1971 (aged 79); Gila River Indian Reservation
- Citizenship: Gila River Indian Community and American
- Occupation: ceramic artist
- Years active: 1930–1970
- Known for: 1940s Maricopa pottery revival

Ida Redbird (Maricopa, 1892–1971) was a Native American potter from the Gila River Indian Community of the Gila River Indian Reservation in Arizona. She was the first president of the Maricopa Pottery Maker's Association and was widely credited with the revival of ancient Maricopa pottery techniques and forms. Her polished black-on-redware pottery was highly prized with collectors. Texas photographer Ted Sayles shot a series documenting Redbird sculpting her pottery. The series toured museums throughout the Western United States.

== Early life ==
Ida Redbird was born March 15, 1892, in Laveen on the Gila River Indian Reservation in Arizona to Hoot Somegustava. Hoot, Ida's mother, is sometimes described as Tohono O'odham and at other times as Maricopa/Halchidhoma. Ida was the granddaughter of Kutox (also known as Kutŏ'x̣ or Uwȧ'nyȧ), who was Halchidhoma and wife of Charlie Redbird (also known as Matȧkwĭsnunyĕ'), who was Maricopa-Halchidhoma. Ida attended Phoenix Indian School, where her former teacher remembered her a being a shy, serious student, who learned pottery at a young age.

== Career ==
In the 1920s, Redbird acted as an interpreter for Leslie Spier's work Yuman Tribes of the Gila River. By the 1930s, her work became known and was selling to dealers from Los Angeles, though for mere pennies. Even though the Great Depression had reduced all wages, the price was still a pittance — a situation Redbird sought to change. Organizing other potters, and backed by Elizabeth Hart, a Home Extension Agent for the U.S. Indian Service, Redbird strove to improve their products so potters could increase their prices. Her efforts earned her the respect of fellow potters, who elected her first president of the Maricopa Pottery Maker's Association.

Redbird's pottery was typically highly polished redware painted with designs in black slip. She built her pots with the paddle-and-anvil technique rather than a coil method. Her method was developed by ancient Hohokam artisans and used local clay from the Gila Riverbed. Once the vessel had dried for several days, a red clay from the Superstition Mountains was liquefied in and applied. When that slip dried, it was burnished with a stone and then fired outside. When the firing had been completed and while the piece was still hot, geometric shapes were painted on it with a boiled mesquite-bark dye.

In 1940, E. B. "Ted" Sayles took images of Redbird and her pottery making techniques. Sales, who was curator of the Arizona State Museum in Tucson, took the photographs to Abilene, Texas, for a show at the Abilene Fine Arts Museum. They were also featured in Arizona Highways Magazine in January 1948. From 1941 until her death, Redbird taught summer classes and exhibited her works at the Heard Museum of Phoenix, Arizona. She and Mary Juan (Maricopa, 1892–1977) also held pottery classes at Casa Grande.

In 1949, Redbird served as an interpreter for Lenora S. M. Curtin in her study of the Pima people, By the Prophet of the Earth. Curtin described Redbird as one of the two best potters of the Maricopa and noted that she was also a skilled herbalist. Guy Acuff regarded Redbird and Lena Mesquerre as two of the best Maricopa potters. Paul Huldermann, founder of the Scottsdale National Indian Arts Exhibition; Tom Cain, curator of the Heard Museum; Dr. Carl Guthe, a one-time president of the American Museum Association; and Kermit Lee, an Arizona Indian art collector all described her as one of the very best Southwestern Native American potters, but Redbird herself thought that Mary Juan was better than she. She exhibited at fairs, museums, and gatherings such as the All-Indian Fair in Lake George, New York and the 1968 Tohono O'odham Powwow held at Casa Grande.

== Death and legacy ==
After completing work on some pots, Redbird sat them out to dry and laid down to take a nap on August 10, 1971. The tree under which she was sleeping on the reservation fell on her and killed her.

A special display of Redbird's works was held shortly after her death at the Heard Museum. Redbird was inducted into the Arizona Women's Hall of Fame in 1985. In 2015, Redbird's work was shown along with other Arizona Native American potters' work in an exhibition at the Amerind Museum and Art Gallery.

Ida Redbird Elementary School is a K-6 public school in the Mesa Public School District of Mesa, Arizona. The school is named after Redbird.
