= Halchidhoma language =

Extinct Yuman language

Halchidhoma
- Halchidhom, Jalchedom, Halehadhoma
- Native to: United States
- Region: California, Arizona
- Ethnicity: Halchidhoma
- Extinct: 1800s?
- Language family: Yuman: Core Yuman; River Yuman; Halchidhoma

Language codes
- ISO 639-3: None (mis)
- Linguist List: mrc-hal
- Glottolog: None

Halchidhoma (Halehadhoma) is a River Yuman language closely related to Maricopa, possibly a dialect of it, formerly spoken by the Halchidhoma people.

== History ==
Historical records indicate that there once was a separate Halchidhoma language within the Yuman family, in the River Yuman subdivision. Due to war and conflict with European settlers, the Halchidhoma settled in with the Maricopa people, in their current location around Greater Phoenix. The Halchidhoma currently identify themselves with the Maricopa tribe, and many live in Lehi, which is a small community within the Salt River Pima-Maricopa Indian Community on the south banks of the Salt River. They continue to speak what they refer to as the Halchidhoma language.

== Bibliography ==
- Kroeber, A. L. (1920). "Yuman Tribes of the Lower Colorado" (PDF). University of California Publications in American Archaeology and Ethnology: 478–482.
- Spier, Leslie (1933). Yuman Tribes of the Gila River. Illinois: University of Chicago Press. hdl:2027/uc1.c086246459. ISBN 978-0486236117. (1978)
- Kelly, Marsha C. (Summer 1972). "The Society That Did Not Die". Ethnohistory. 19 (3): 261–265. doi:10.2307/480977. JSTOR 480977.
