= Maricopa coquimbella =

Scientific classification
- Kingdom: Animalia
- Phylum: Arthropoda
- Class: Insecta
- Order: Lepidoptera
- Family: Pyralidae
- Genus: Maricopa
- Species: M. coquimbella

Binomial name
- Maricopa coquimbella Ragonot, 1888

Synonyms
- Valdivia coquimbella Ragonot, 1888

Species of moth

Maricopa coquimbella is a species of snout moth in the genus Maricopa. It was described by Ragonot in 1888. It is found in Chile.
