= Halchidhoma traditional narratives =

Halchidhoma traditional narratives include myths, legends, tales, and oral histories preserved by the Halchidhoma people who formerly lived along the lower Colorado River in southeastern California and western Arizona.

The record of Halchidhoma oral literature is largely limited to the 11 narratives collected in 1929-1930 by anthropologist Leslie Spier from Kutox, a Halchidhoma man living among the Maricopa. Included are such characteristic southern California materials as that region's version of the creation myth and the Flute Lure story.

== See also ==
- Traditional narratives (Native California)
