= Battle of Pima Butte =

Part of the American Indian Wars

- Part of the American Indian Wars
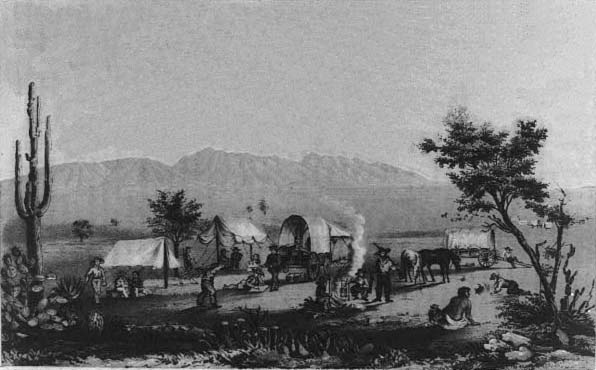
- An American wagon train and Maricopas at Maricopa Wells in 1857.
Date	September 1, 1857
Location	near Maricopa Wells, Pima Butte, Sierra Estrella, Arizona
Result	Maricopa/Pima victory

Belligerents
Yuma; Mohave; Yavapai; Apache	Maricopa; Pima

Commanders and leaders
Francisco †	unknown

Strength
~300	unknown

Casualties and losses
~200 killed or wounded	unknown

The Battle of Pima Butte, or the Battle of Maricopa Wells, was fought on September 1, 1857 at Pima Butte, Arizona near Maricopa Wells in the Sierra Estrella. Yuma, Mohave, Apache and Yavapai warriors attacked a Maricopa village named Secate in one of the largest battles in Arizona's history. It was also the last major battle fought by the Yumas and the last major battle fought solely between Native Americans in North America.

== Battle ==
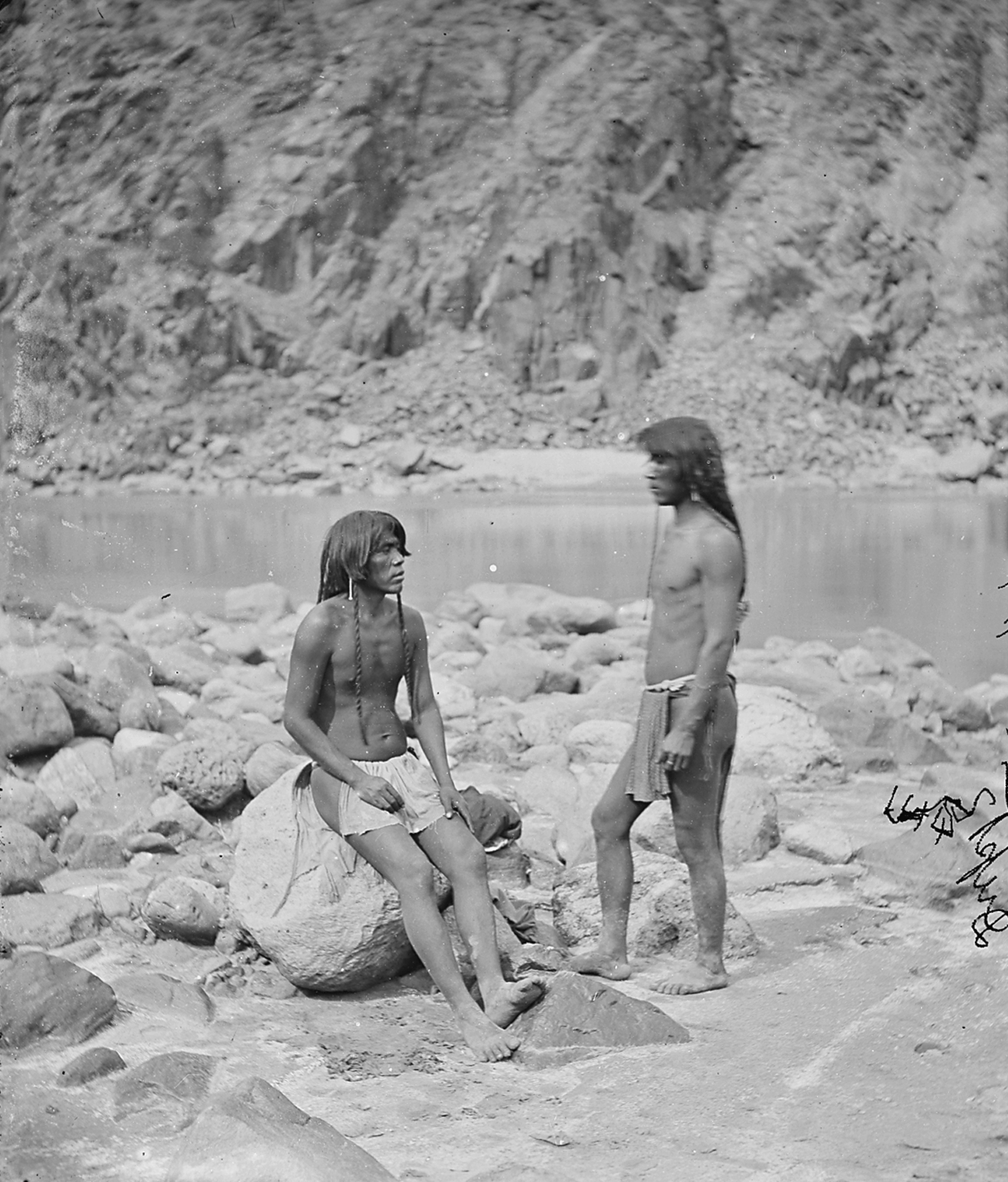
Two Mohave warriors in 1871, by Timothy H. O'Sullivan

For hundreds of years prior to 1857, the Yumas and the Maricopas were enemies. On many occasions the two tribes would gather their warriors together at the peak of Berdache Mountain. There the two sides would shout insults at each other before fighting a battle. Chief Francisco of the Yuma led the combined army which numbered at least 300 men and they arrived near Secate on August 31, 1857. Francisco began his attack the following morning and captured the Maricopa village and began burning the structures. The Yumas and their allies had just walked 160 miles over the course of eight days so Francisco's men were tired and hungry. As a result, the Yumas and their allies made the deadly mistake of remaining in the burning village to rest and eat the captured Maricopa food.

When Francisco's army attacked, the surviving women and children fled for protection to Pima Butte, which was just to the south of the village. The warriors gathered as well and sent a distress call to the nearby Pima villages. The Pima sent all of their warriors in the area and a counterattack was then launched. But before the Maricopa and Pima arrived, all of the Apaches, Yavapais and most of the Mohaves fled, leaving the remaining Yumas and Mohaves outnumbered. The Maricopa and Pima forces, some mounted on horses, surrounded the attackers before annihilating them. Most of the Yumas and Mohaves were killed, including Chief Francisco. On or about September 11, traveler John B. Hilton visited the battlefield and later wrote that he observed ninety bodies in one spot, lying on the ground in every kind of position.

The San Diego Herald mistakenly reported on September 12 that the battle was a three-sided engagement between the Pima, Yuma and the Maricopa all against each other. At the same time the Daily Alta California reported that the battle was

....seldom equaled in Indian warfare. It is reported that 150 to 160 allied Indians, being nearly of quite the entire party, were left dead in the field.

The allies referred to the Yuma who after the Yuma War became good neighbors with the Americans on the California side of the Colorado River. In a later article, the San Diego Herald stated the following;

....from all accounts it would appear that this battle, in which the Maricopas and their allies the Pima so bravely defended their homes, destroying nearly the whole force which came into battle against them, is the largest Indian fight in this region for years.
