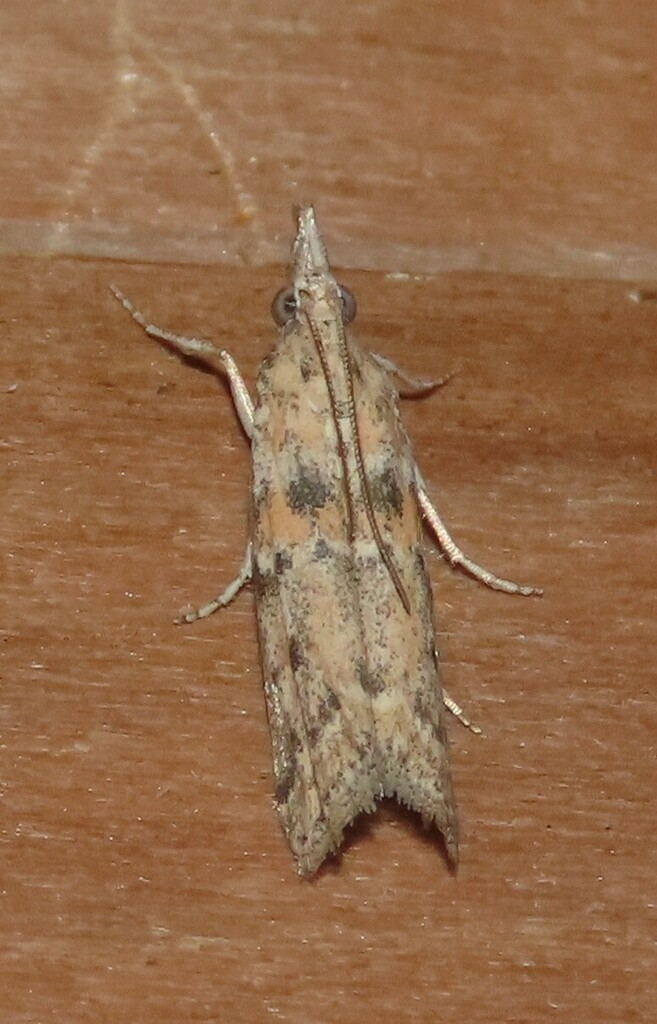

Scientific classification
- Kingdom: Animalia
- Phylum: Arthropoda
- Clade: Pancrustacea
- Class: Insecta
- Order: Lepidoptera
- Family: Pyralidae
- Genus: Maricopa
- Species: M. lativittella

Binomial name
- Maricopa lativittella (Ragonot, 1887)

Synonyms
- Ciris lativittella Ragonot, 1887; Zophodia aureomaculella Dyar, 1903

= Maricopa lativittella =

Species of moth

Maricopa lativittella is a species of snout moth. It was first described by Ragonot in 1887. It is found in North America, including Texas.
