= Recessional agriculture =

Form of agricultural cultivation that takes place on a floodplain

Recessional agriculture, also known as flood-retreat agriculture, is a form of agricultural cultivation that takes place on a floodplain. Farmers practice recessional agriculture by successively planting in the formerly flooded areas after the waters recede. Seeds are scattered on the fertile silt deposited by the receding flood. Similarly to how fire deployed in slash-and-burn agriculture creates a field, the receding flood drowns all competing vegetation and deposits a layer of soft, easily worked silt as it recedes.

Thus recessional agriculture serves as a rudimentary form of irrigation. This may have been the earliest form of cultivation in the Tigris-Euphrates floodplain, as well as in the Nile Valley. Soil type is an important consideration in recessional agriculture. One type of crop grown by this method is sorghum. Clay soils are especially suitable for recessional agriculture.
