= Maricopa language =

Native American language of Arizona, US

Maricopa
- Piipaash chuukwer / Xalychidoma chuukwer
- Native to: United States
- Region: Maricopa County, Arizona
- Ethnicity: 800 Maricopa and Halchidhoma (2007)
- Native speakers: 35 (2015 census)
- Language family: Yuman: Core Yuman; River Yuman; Maricopa

Language codes
- ISO 639-3: mrc
- Glottolog: mari1440
- ELP: Maricopa
- Maricopa is classified as Severely Endangered by the UNESCO Atlas of the World's Languages in Danger.

Maricopa or Piipaash is spoken by the Native American Maricopa people on two reservations in Arizona: the Salt River Pima-Maricopa Indian Community and the Gila River Indian Community. Most speakers live in Maricopa Colony. The language is considered severely endangered by UNESCO.

Although the Maricopa now live among the Pima, their language is completely unrelated. It is a Yuman language, related to other languages such as Mohave, Cocopah, Havasupai, Yavapai and Kumeyaay, while the Pima speak a Uto-Aztecan language.

According to the Ethnologue, language shift is occurring at Maricopa Colony: "The child-bearing generation can use the language among themselves, but it is not being transmitted to children." At Salt River, it is nearly extinct: "The only remaining users of the language are members of the grandparent generation or older who have little opportunity to use the language.

There are about 100 speakers out of an ethnic population of 800. Salt River's cultural resources department estimates that there are around 15 fluent native speakers remaining in the Salt River community. There are many more with varying degrees of fluency, including many who can understand but not speak Maricopa.

The modern Maricopa people are actually an amalgamation of five separate but related groups, with different dialects. There are now two dialects of Maricopa: Piipaash and Xalychidom. Most Piipaash reside at Maricopa Colony on the Gila River Indian Community, and most Xalychidom reside at Salt River. However, all remaining dialect differences are fairly minor. Xalychidom is the dialect spoken by the formerly distinct Xalychidom people.

There is a language revitalization program at Salt River, the O'odham Piipaash Language Program, offering immersion classes, language-based cultural arts classes, community language-based social activities, and assistance with translation, cultural information and language learning.

== Phonology ==
All claims and examples in this section come from Gordon (1986) unless otherwise noted.

=== Consonants ===
		Labial	Alveolar		Retroflex	Palatal	Velar			Uvular		Glottal
		Labial	plain	pal.	Retroflex	Palatal	plain	lab.	pal.	plain	lab.	Glottal
Stop		p	t		ʈ		k	kʷ	kʲ	q	qʷ	ʔ
Affricate						t͡ʃ						
Fricative	voiceless	(f)	s		ʂ		x	xʷ				
Fricative	voiced	v	ð									
Nasal		m	n			ɲ	(ŋ)					
Approximant			l	lʲ		j		w				
Trill			r									

Phonemes /f/ and /ŋ/ occur only in loanwords like kafe /kafe/ 'coffee' and narangk /naraŋk/ 'orange', both from Spanish. [ŋ] also occurs as an allophone of /ɲ/.

=== Vowels ===
Maricopa has 10 phonemic vowels made up of 5 pairs of corresponding long and short vowels with the cross-linguistically common five-way quality contrast:

	Front	Central	Back
High	i iː		u uː
Mid	e eː		o oː
Low		a aː	

There are falling diphthongs that glide from one vowel sound into another. Diphthongs can also be long or short: /ej/ and /eːj/ are both found.

Diphthongs are

/aj aːj ej eːj oj oːj uj uːj aw aːw ew eːw/,

as in kwidui /kwiduj/ and mahai /maxaj/.

=== Stress and intonation ===
Stress within a word falls on the final root vowel (they are capitalized):

/XOT-k/ → [ˈxotɪk]
/m-XOT-k/ → [məˈxotɪk]
/XʷET-xot-m/ → [ˈxʷetxotɪm]

Declarative sentences have a falling intonation toward the end of the sentence.

Interrogative sentences have a rising intonation toward the end of the sentence.

=== Epenthesis ===
Epenthesis of vowels to relieve consonant clusters is a major and complicated issue in Maricopa. It is not completely understood, but some general statement can be made.

Epenthetic vowels can have the quality of any other vowel as well as some reduced vowel qualities. However, the form is basically predictable from the local context:

- [ɪ]/[i] occur after palatal or alveolar consonants
- XX before /ʔ/ the epenthetic
- [ɪ]/[ə] occur elsewhere

Sequences of three non-syllabic consonants never surface without epenthesis. Sequences of two consonants sometimes cause epenthesis, depending on the consonants in question.

Nasals and liquids are least likely to accompany epenthesis, as they often syllabify instead, particularly in the following circumstances:

- An initial nasal before a homorganic stop optionally becomes syllabic.
- An initial liquid before a clitic boundary optionally becomes syllabic.
- In /nn/ sequences, the first n syllabifies. (However, in /mm/ sequences, epenthesis occurs instead, yielding [məm].)

In most other initial two-consonant cluster, epenthesis occurs:

/mxan-k/ → [məxanɪk]
/ʔ-mxan-k/ → [ʔəmxanɪk]

Some final clusters are allowed, but others are broken up. The distinction seems to rest partially on the number of syllables in the word as well as the particular sequence of consonants:

/wiʂ-k/ → [wiʂk]
/uːwiʂ-k/ → [uːwiʂɪk]

=== Assimilation and other phonological changes ===
Non-initial sequences of identical oral consonants, other than /ʂ/, geminate:

/mðiːlʲ-lʲa/ → [mðiːlʲːa]
/nak-k/ → [nakː]

The sequence /ʂʂ/ can surface as [tʂ]. Thus, /ʔiːpaʂ-ʂ/ may surface as [ʔiːpatʂ] or [ʔiːpaʂɪʂ].

When /t͡ʃ/ follows any segment except /ʂ/ and precedes any unstressed segment, it deaffricates to /ʂ/: /t͡ʃmɲaː-k/ surfaces as [t͡ʃɪmɪɲaːk], but /m-t͡ʃmɲaː-k/ surfaces as [mɪʂɪmɪɲaːk].

For less conservative speakers, /t͡ʃ/ can surface as /ʂ/ before any unstressed segment other than /s/.

Unstressed high vowels can lower to the corresponding mid vowel.

[u] is inserted between a rounded consonant and a round or labial consonant. A rounded consonant can delabialize before any other consonant.

/ɲ/ assimilates to [ŋ] before a velar or post-velar consonant. After a morpheme boundary, [ŋ] is preceded by [ɪ].

Between a back vowel and any following vowel, [w] is inserted:

/juː-uːm/ → [juːwuːm]
/maː-uːm/ → [maːwuːm]

Between a front vowel and a background vowel, /j/ is inserted:

/siː-uːm/ → [siːjuːm]
/mɲe-uːm/ → [mɪɲejuːm]

== Morphology ==
=== Case marking ===
Maricopa has a subject marker -sh but no marker for the direct object.

mat-v-sh 'or'or-m
earth-DEMONSTRATIVE-SUBJECT round-REAL
"The world (near) is round."

'iipaa-ny-sh qwaaq kyaa-m
man-DEMONSTRATIVE-SUBJECT deer shoot-REAL
"The man shot the deer."

There are four other cases: comitative ("with, about"), adessive/allative ("at, towards"), inessive/illative ("in, on, into"), and general locative or directional ("to, from").

-m: comitative ("with"), instrumental ("with, by means of").

Grace-sh Bonnie-m uudav-k
Grace-SUBJECT Bonnie-COMITATIVE be=with-REAL
"Grace is with Bonnie."

-ii: locative with adessive ("at") and allative ("to, toward") meanings.

h'a-sh ha-s-ii v'aw-m
tree-SUBJECT water-DEMONSTRATIVE-LOCATIVE stand-REAL
"The tree is by the water (distant, out of sight)."

-ly: locative with inessive ("in, on") and illative ("into, to") meanings.

iipaa-ny-sh Flagstaff-ly yem-k
man-DEMONSTRATIVE-SUBJECT Flagstaff-LOCATIVE go-REAL
"The man went to Flagstaff."

-k: general locative and directional ("to, from").

Lynn-sh Yuma-k dii-k
Lynn-SUBJECT Yuma-LOCATIVE come-REAL
"Lynn came from Yuma."

Case markers can be clitics in verbs as if they were applicative markers.

tdish mat ily-k-shvaw-k
corn earth LOCATIVE-IMPERATIVE-put-REAL
"Plant the corn in the ground."

'ii hat ny-m-'-aham-m
wood dog DEMONSTRATIVE-INSTRUMENTAL-FIRSTPERSON-hit-REAL
"I hit the dog with the stick."

=== Negative ===
Verbs are negated by adding the circumfix (w)aly-...-ma.

chii-sh ha=han-ly aly-dik-ma-k
fish-SUBJECT river-LOCATIVE NEGATIVE-lie-NEGATIVE-REAL
"(There) aren't (any) fish in the river."

waly-'-tpuy-ma-k
NEGATIVE-FIRSTPERSON-kill-NEGATIVE-REAL
"I didn't kill him."

Heather-sh va aly-k-di-ma-k
Heather-SUBJECT house NEGATIVE-LOCATIVE-come-NEGATIVE-REAL
"Heather didn't come from the house."

In copulative sentences (those with the verb "to be"), the negative element is placed on the predicate noun.

'iipaa-sh waly-'-do-ma-k
man-SUBJECT NEGATIVE-FIRSTPERSON-be-NEGATIVE-REAL
"I am not a man."

aly-'iipaa-ma-sh (duu-m)
NEGATIVE-man-NEGATIVE-SUBJECT be-REAL
"She is not a man."

The first element of the negative circumfix is sometimes omitted, such as a sentence with nominalization.

nyip '-ny-kwr'ak pakyer-ma-sh
me FIRSTPERSON-POSSESSIVE-old.man cowboy-NEGATIVE-SUBJECT
"My husband is not a cowboy."

harav uusish-ma-sh hot-k
liquour drink+NOMINATIVE-NEGATIVE-SUBJECT good-REAL
"Not drinking liquor is good."

There are constructions with a variable placement of the negative morpheme. In reflexives, the reflexive morpheme mat- can precede or follow the first part of the negative circumfix.

waly-mat-'-shoot-ma-ksh
NEGATIVE-REFLEXIVE-FIRSTPERSON-hurt-NEGATIVE-1PPERFECT
"I didn't hurt myself."

mat-aly-'-shoot-ma-ksh
REFLEXIVE-NEGATIVE-FIRSTPERSON-hurt-NEGATIVE-1PPERFECT
"I didn't hurt myself."

Maricopa has no unique word for "never." The language uses the verb aly-'aa-ma-k 'NEGATIVE-hear-NEGATIVE-REAL' and the event that did not occur as a subordinate clause.

man-sh m-shmaa-m aly-m-'aa-ma-k
you-SUBJECT SECONDPERSON-sleep-m NEGATIVE-SECONDPERSON-hear-NEGATIVE-REAL
"You never sleep."

Bonnie '-yuu-k waly-'aa-ma-k
Bonnie FIRSTPERSON-see-SAMESUBJECT NEGATIVE-hear-NEGATIVE-REAL
"I never see Bonnie."

There is a special verb kuvar, meaning "to be none," to express the meaning of "there isn't."

mash-sh kuvar-k
food-SUBJECT none-REAL
"There is no food."

man-sh shyaal m-kuvar-k
you-SUBJECT money SECONDPERSON-none-REAL
"You have no money."

Negative adverbs vary in scope depending on their position relative to the negative circumfix. For example, the adverb -haay 'still, yet' is outside of the scope of the negation if the order of the morphemes is ma-haay. On the other hand, 'still' is inside of the scope of the negation if the order of the morphemes is haay-ma.

'iikway dany aly-shveesh-ma-haay-k
cow DEMONSTRATIVE NEGATIVE-milk+DUAL.SUBJECT-NEGATIVE-yet-REAL
"They haven't milked the cow yet."

'ayuu waly-m-evsh-haay-ma-k
something NEGATIVE-ASC-work+DUAL.SUBJECT-yet-NEGATIVE-REAL
"They are not still working."

=== Interrogative words ===
The following is a summary of interrogative words:

	mki 'who'	mki 'where'	mkip 'which'	kawish 'what'
Subject	mkish		mkipsh	kawitsh
Object	mkiny		mkip	kawish
Commitative and instrumental (with) -m	mkinym		mkipm	kawishm
Adessive and allative (at, to, towards) -ii		mkii	mkipii	
Inessive and illative (in, into) -ly		mkily	mkiply	
General locative (to) -k	mkinyk	mkik	mkipk	

Mki-sh m-ashham-m?
who-SUBJECT 3RDSUBJECT+2NDOBJECT-hit+DISTANCE+QUESTION
"Who hit you?"

Mkip-sh v'aw-m duu?
which-SUBJECT stand-REAL be
"Who is standing there?"

Mki-ny m-ashham-k?
who-OBJECT 2NDSUBJECT+3RDOBJECT-hit+DISTANCE-QUESTION
"Who did you hit?"

Kawit-sh ka-do-t-uum?
what-SUBJECT QUESTION-be-EMPHATIC-INC
"What would happen?"

== Syntax ==
=== Gender ===
Maricopa does not make a grammatical gender distinction.

=== No word for "and" ===
David Gil reports that the Maricopa managed quite well despite having no equivalent for "and". The various relevant relations are solved by using different linguistic structures. However, whether the absence of a lexeme constitutes a lexical gap depends on not a theory but the shared verbal habits of the people using the relevant conceptualization.

Accordingly, it is not valid to say that speakers of Maricopa lack the lexeme "and". Rather, it is speakers of, for example, English who would experience the lack.

=== Word order ===
The basic word order for transitive sentences is subject–object–verb. Intransitive sentences are subject-verb. Ditransitive sentences are subject-dative-object-verb.

mhay-ny-sh qwaaq tpuy-m
boy-DEMONSTRATIVE-SUBJECT deer kill-REAL
"The boy killed a deer."

sny'ak-sh ashvar-k
woman-SUBJECT sing-REAL
"The/A woman sang."

Heather-sh Pam kwnho aay-m
Heather-SUBJECT Pam basket give-REAL
"Heather gave a basket to Pam."

Possessive words precede nouns. There are inalienable nouns such as clothing items, which must bear possessive markers.

Bonnie s'aw ime
Bonnie offspring leg
"Bonnie's baby's leg."

m-kpur
2NDPERSON-hat
"Your hat."

Bonnie avhay
Bonnie dress
"Bonnie's dress."

Determiners are expressed as suffixes or independent words following the noun.

posh-v-sh ii'ily-k
cat-DEMONSTRATIVE-SUBJECT be=infested-REAL
"This cat (near, at hand) has fleas."

chyer vany-a shviily-sh hmaaly-m
bird DEMONSTRATIVE-EPENTHETICVOWEL feather-SUBJECT white-REAL
"That bird's feathers are white."

=== No independent adjective category ===
The language has no independent adjective category: "Intransitive verbs in their unmarked forms (with no nominalizing morphemes) can be used as attributive adjectives with an NP." Furthermore, it appears that there is no difference between the attributive and the predicative form of adjectival forms.

'iipaa hmii sper-sh ny-wik-k
man tall strong-SUBJECT THIRD/FIRSTPERSON-help-REAL
"A tall, strong man helped me."

'iipaa-ny-sh hmii-k
man-DEMONSTRATIVE-SUBJECT tall-REAL
"The man is tall."

=== Yes/no questions ===
Questions are marked by "rising intonation and by the structure of the verb" For most verbs, the question suffix is -m or a zero morpheme.

M-mii?
2NDPERSON-cry
"Did you cry?"

M-mii-m?
2NDPERSON-cry-QUESTION
"Did you cry?"

'Ayuu-'-maa-(m)?
something-1STPERSON-eat-QUESTION
"Did I eat something?"

Pam-sh 'ayuu-maa-(m)?
Pam-SUBJECT something-eat-QUESTION
"Did Pam eat something?"

If a zero morpheme is used to mark the question and the root of the verb is consonant-final, an epenthetic -ii is added.

M-nmak-ii?
2NDPERSON-leave-EPENTHETICVOWEL
"Did you leave it?"

M-nmak-m?
2NDPERSON-leave-QUESTION
"Did you leave it?"

To form a question in the second person ("you"), some verbs can have a -k or -m for questions.

M-yoq-k?
2NDPERSON-vomit-QUESTION
"Did you vomit?"

M-yoq-m?
2NDPERSON-vomit-QUESTION
"Did you vomit?"

== See also ==
- Halchidhoma language
