= Maricopa (moth) =

Scientific classification
- Domain: Eukaryota
- Kingdom: Animalia
- Phylum: Arthropoda
- Class: Insecta
- Order: Lepidoptera
- Family: Pyralidae
- Subfamily: Phycitinae
- Genus: Maricopa; Hulst, 1890

Synonyms
- Valdivia Ragonot, 1888

Genus of moths

Maricopa is a genus of snout moths described by George Duryea Hulst in 1890.

== Species ==
- Maricopa coquimbella Ragonot, 1888
- Maricopa lativittella Ragonot, 1887
