= List of Arizona locations by per capita income =

Ranked Arizona's Per Capita Income Distribution by County latest official survey

Total Arizona per capita income (wikidata:Q816) = 32,340 US$ (2020 survey methodology)
(WD = Wikidata page)

[Hide/show County Per Capita Income]
	Arizona	per. US$
1	Maricopa County, Arizona	35,090^{WD}
2	Yavapai County, Arizona	31,779^{WD}
3	Pima County, Arizona	30,747^{WD}
4	Cochise County, Arizona	28,021^{WD}
5	Mohave County, Arizona	27,968^{WD}
6	Coconino County, Arizona	27,631^{WD}
7	Greenlee County, Arizona	27,618^{WD}
8	Pinal County, Arizona	27,354^{WD}
9	Gila County, Arizona	26,265^{WD}
10	La Paz County, Arizona	24,039^{WD}
11	Yuma County, Arizona	23,507^{WD}
12	Santa Cruz County, Arizona	21,686^{WD}
13	Graham County, Arizona	19,878^{WD}
14	Navajo County, Arizona	19,623^{WD}
15	Apache County, Arizona	15,781^{WD}

Arizona had the twenty-ninth highest per capita income in the United States of America, at $20,275 in 2000. Its personal per capita income was $26,838 in 2003. In 2020 the state's per capita income was $32,340 which remained under the United States medium.

== Per capita income and household income ==
Arizona economic demographics by county as of 31 December 2020
State	County	Per capita income	Median house– hold income	Total income	Population	Number of house– holds
United States		$35,384	$98,357	$120,344,871 million	340,110,988	122,354,219
Arizona		$32,340	$87,492	$2,312,795 million	7,151,502	2,643,430
	Apache County	$15,781	$48,448	$10,418 million	66,021	21,505
	Cochise County	$28,021	$69,036	$35,151 million	125,447	50,917
	Coconino County	$27,631	$81,795	$40,092 million	145,101	49,016
	Gila County	$26,265	$62,122	$13,991 million	53,272	22,523
	Graham County	$19,878	$67,497	$7,659 million	38,533	11,348
	Greenlee County	$27,618	$80,155	$2,641 million	9,563	3,295
	La Paz County	$24,039	$40,090	$3,980 million	16,557	9,928
	Maricopa County	$35,090	$85,566	$1,551,177 million	4,420,568	1,812,827
	Mohave County	$27,968	$65,971	$59,646 million	213,267	90,413
	Navajo County	$19,623	$57,520	$20,941 million	106,717	36,406
	Pima County	$30,747	$78,070	$320,824 million	1,043,433	410,942
	Pinal County	$27,354	$78,368	$116,326 million	425,264	148,435
	Santa Cruz County	$21,686	$64,412	$10,337 million	47,669	16,049
	Yavapai County	$31,779	$74,141	$75,064 million	236,209	101,245
	Yuma County	$23,507	$64,223	$47,926 million	203,881	74,624

Note: Data is automatically updated to be the latest on Wikidata. At the time of page automation this was the 2020 United States Census and the 2016–2020 American Community Survey.
