= Halchidhoma =

Native American tribe in Arizona and New Mexico

Halchidhoma Xalychidom Piipaa
- Tribe
- Location: Salt River reservation
- Population: 1000
- Language: Maricopa language, formerly Halchidhoma language

The Halchidhoma (Note: Or Alchedoma, Achedoma.) (Maricopa: Xalychidom Piipaa or Xalychidom Piipaash – 'people who live toward the water') are a Native American tribe now living mostly on the Salt River reservation, but formerly native to the area along the lower Colorado River in California and Arizona when first contacted by Europeans. In the early nineteenth century, under pressure from their hostile Mohave and Quechan neighbors, they moved to the middle Gila River, where some merged with the Maricopa, and others went on to Salt River and maintained an independent identity.

The Halchidhoma currently speak the Maricopa language.

== History ==
The Halchidhoma entered written history in 1604–1605, when a Spanish expedition coming overland from New Mexico under Juan de Oñate encountered the "Alebdoma" on the lower Colorado River, below its junction with the Gila River. When the Jesuit missionary-explorer Eusebio Francisco Kino returned to the river in 1700, the Halchidhoma had moved to a portion of the river 100 miles farther north.

A system of military alliances and traditional hostilities seems to have prevailed among the relatively warlike tribes of the lower Colorado and Gila rivers. This may account for the Halchidhoma's move during the seventeenth century. The Halchidhoma were part of an alliance that also included the Maricopa and Cocopa, among others, and was opposed by the Quechan and Mohave. In the 1820s, the Halchidhoma were finally driven from the Colorado River. They took refuge with the Maricopa on the middle Gila River. In the following decades, some continued on to Lehi on the Salt River and maintained a separate identity, while others stayed and became assimilated to the Maricopa. The territory on the Colorado River vacated by the Halchidhoma was subsequently occupied by the Chemehuevi.

== Population ==
Estimates for the pre-contact populations of most native groups in California have varied substantially. (See Population of Native California.) The Franciscan missionary-explorer Francisco Garcés estimated the Halchidhoma population in 1776 as 2,500. Alfred L. Kroeber (1925:883) put the 1770 population of the Halchidhoma at 1,000.

== Modern relationship with Maricopa ==
Halchidhoma people in the Salt River Pima-Maricopa Indian Community nearly universally identify themselves in English as Maricopa, although both groups testify that they are separate, maintaining separate languages and identities (Kelly 1972:264).

== See also ==
- Halchidhoma traditional narratives
