= Cocopah Indian Reservation =

Indian reservation in Arizona, United States

Coordinates: 32°37′03″N 114°46′58″W

Cocopah Tribe of Arizona Xawiłł Kwñchawaay (Cocopah)
- Indian reservation
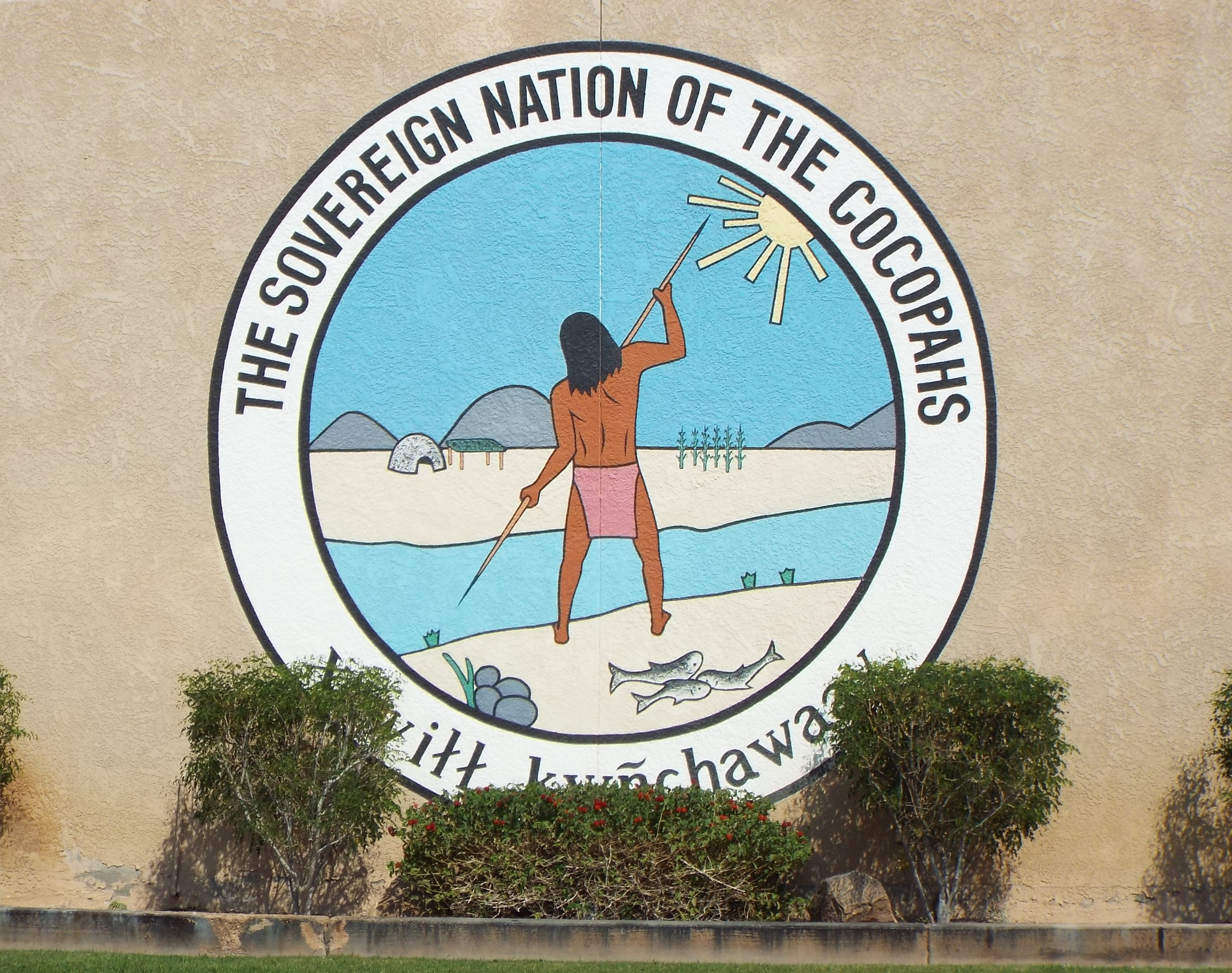
- Seal

- Yuma County with Cocopah Reservation highlighted
- Federally recognized: 1917
- Seat: Somerton, Arizona

Government
  - Chairwoman: Sherry Cordova

Area
  - Total: 6,600 acres (2,700 ha)
- Demonym: Cocopah
- Time zone: UTC−7 (MST)
- Area code(s): 928
- Website: cocopah.com

The Cocopah Tribe of Arizona is a federally recognized tribe of Cocopah people which governs the Cocopah Indian Reservation, a reservation in Arizona. Their autonym is Xawiłł Kwñchawaay, and they speak the Cocopah language, a Yuman–Cochimí language.

As of the 2000 census, 1,025 people lived on the 25.948 km^{2} (10.019 sq mi) Cocopah Indian Reservation, which is composed of three non-contiguous sections in Yuma County, Arizona, lying northwest, southwest and south of the city of Yuma, Arizona. The larger section, bordering the Colorado River, lies west of the Yuma suburb of Somerton, while the other section lies just east of Somerton.

== Government ==
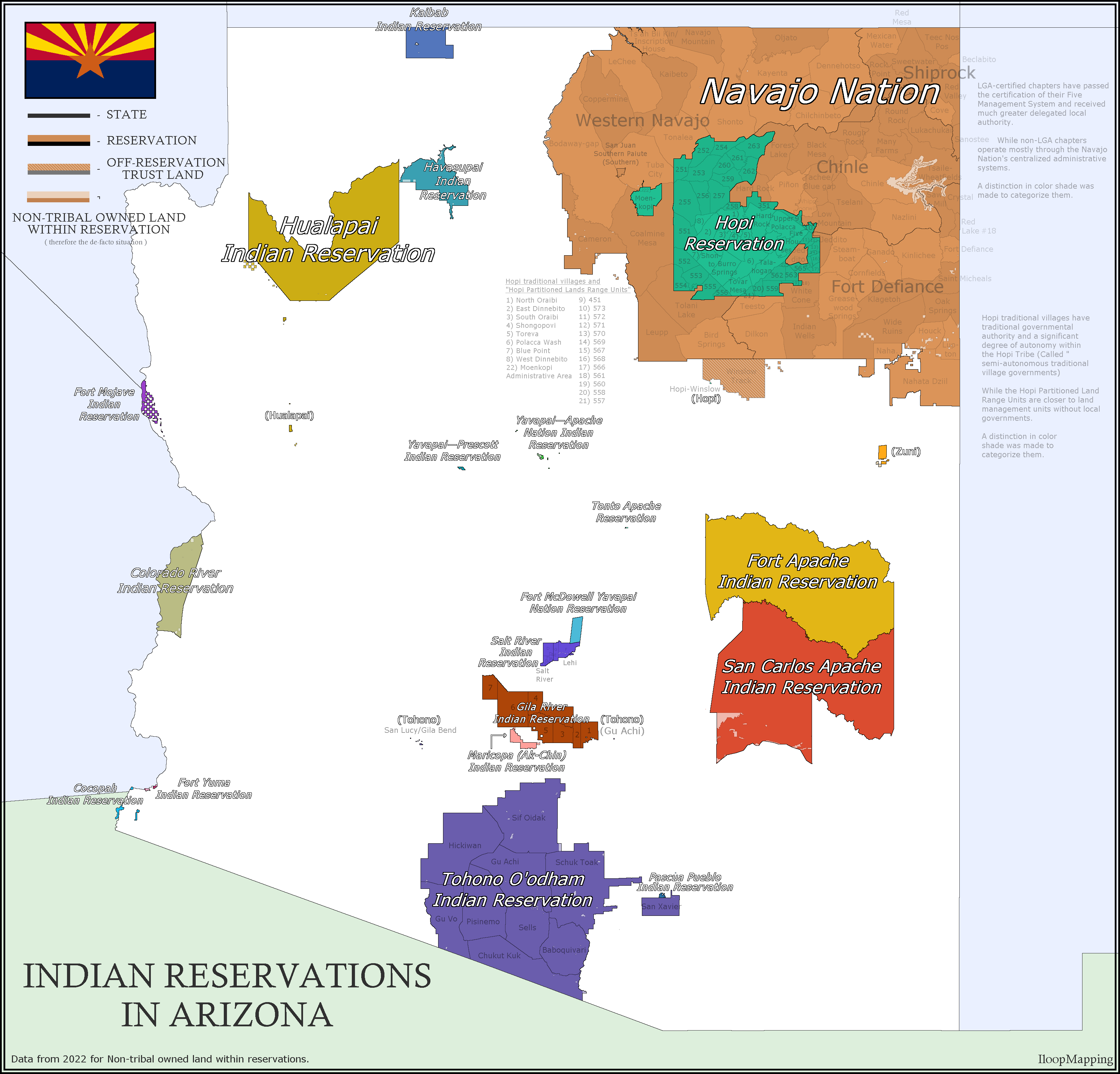
Map of the Cocopah Tribe and neighboring tribes.

The tribe is governed by a democratically elected council. As of 2025, the administration is:

- Chairwoman: Sherry Cordova
- Vice Chairman: Neil White
- Council Member: Wynnie Ortega
- Council Member: Florence M. Fitch
- Council Member: Jennifer Townsend

== Economic development ==
There is a casino and bingo hall on the reservation. The Cocopah Casino Resort is in Somerton, Arizona, and includes the Artisan Restaurant, Rivers Edge Bar, Sunset Lounge, and food court. The tribal also owns the Cocopah Casino Hotel and Resort in Yuma, Arizona, and the Cocopah Resort and Conference Center, which includes the Wild River Family Entertainment Center, in Somerton.

== Culture ==
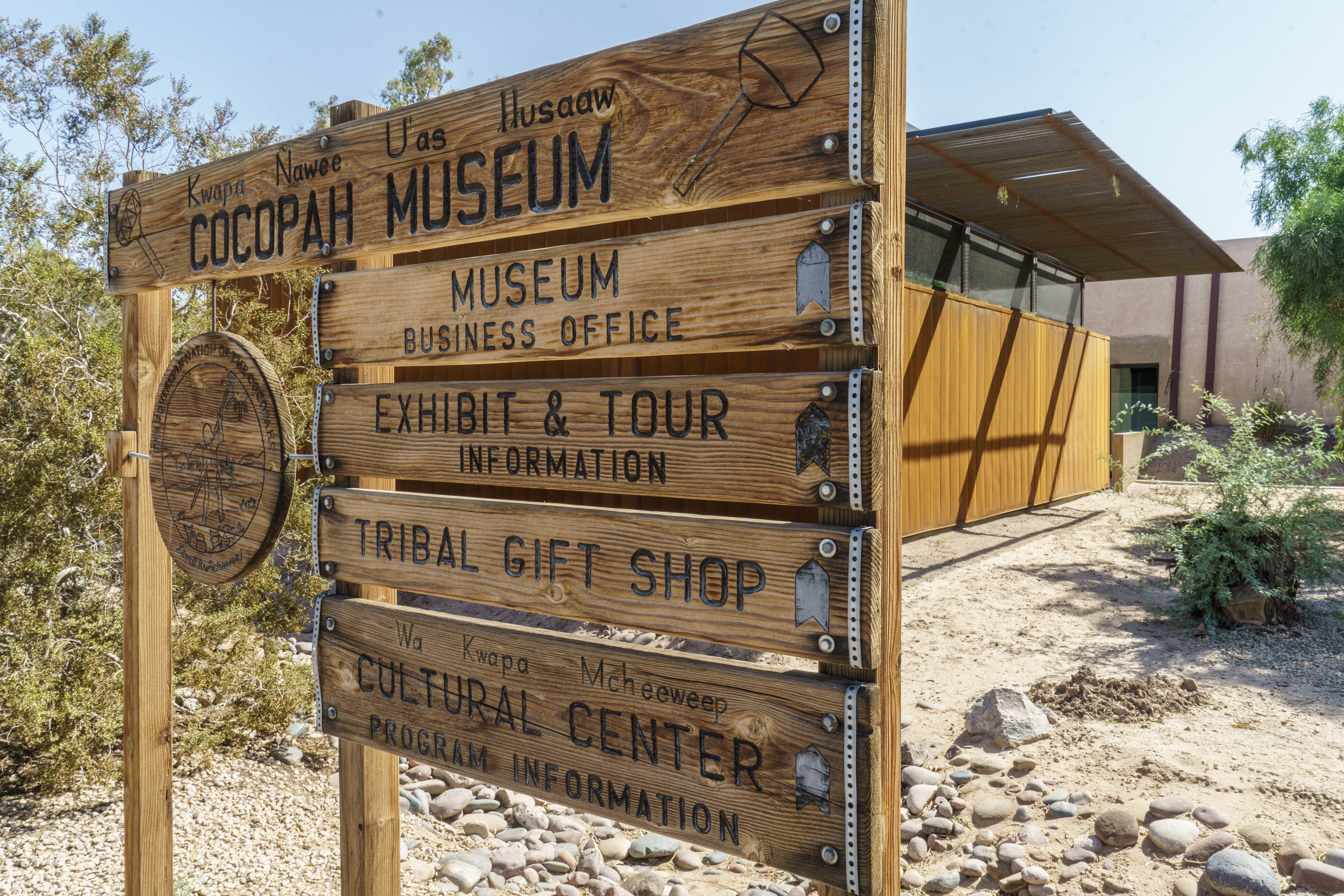
Cocopah Museum and Cultural Center sign

The tribe opened the Cocopah Museum and Cultural Center in 1996. Located in Somerton, Arizona, the museum houses exhibitions and a gift shop and hosts dances, hand games, and other gatherings.

The Cocopah Indian Tribe maintains a dance ground. The tribe's cultural resources department protects tangible and intangible resources and provides programming and access to cultural sites and knowledge for Cocopah people. Cocopah Parks Community Center in Somerton hosts artistic, athletic, musical, and other programming for tribal citizens.

== History ==
=== 20th century ===
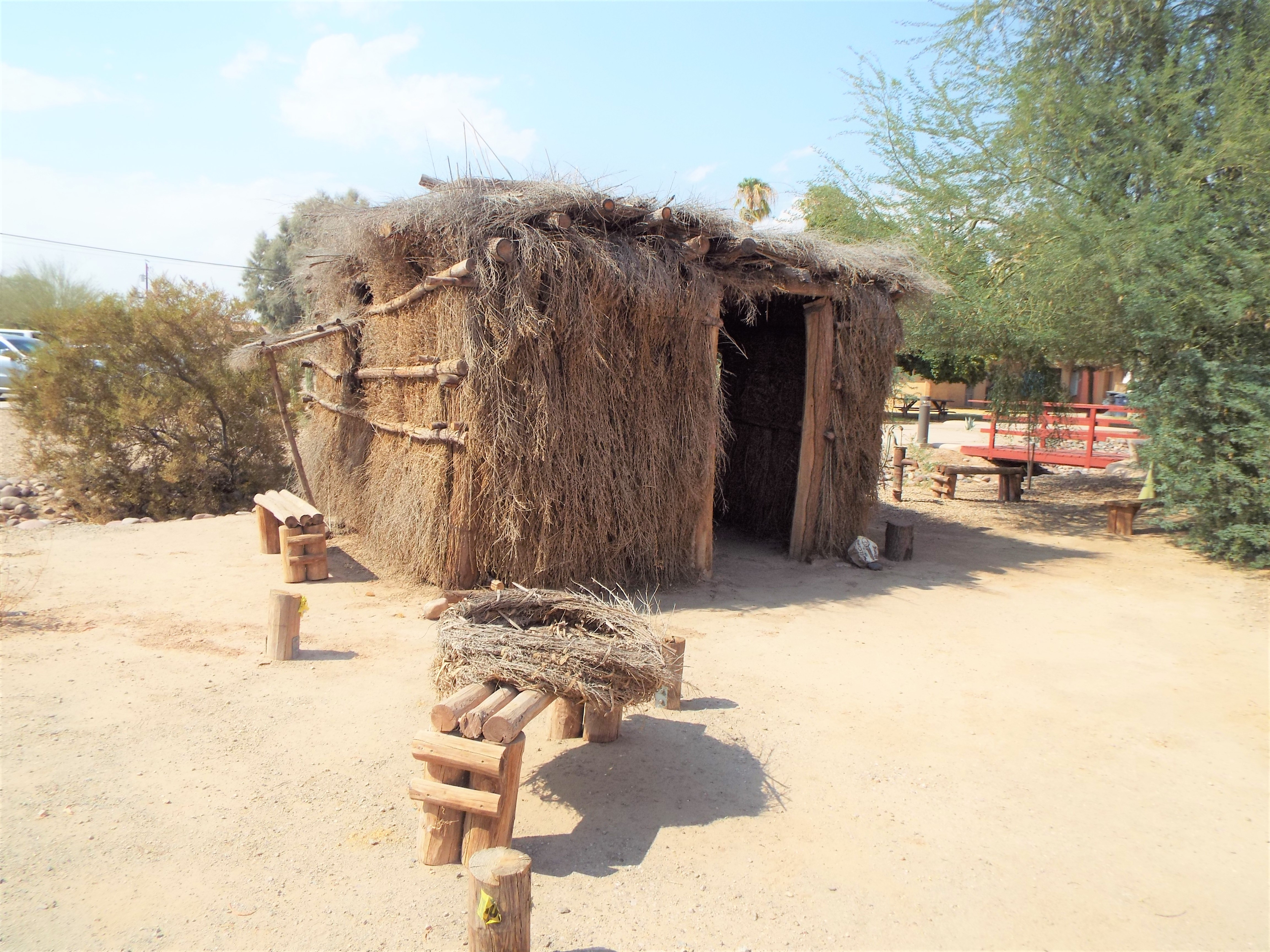
Early-style Cocopah dwelling

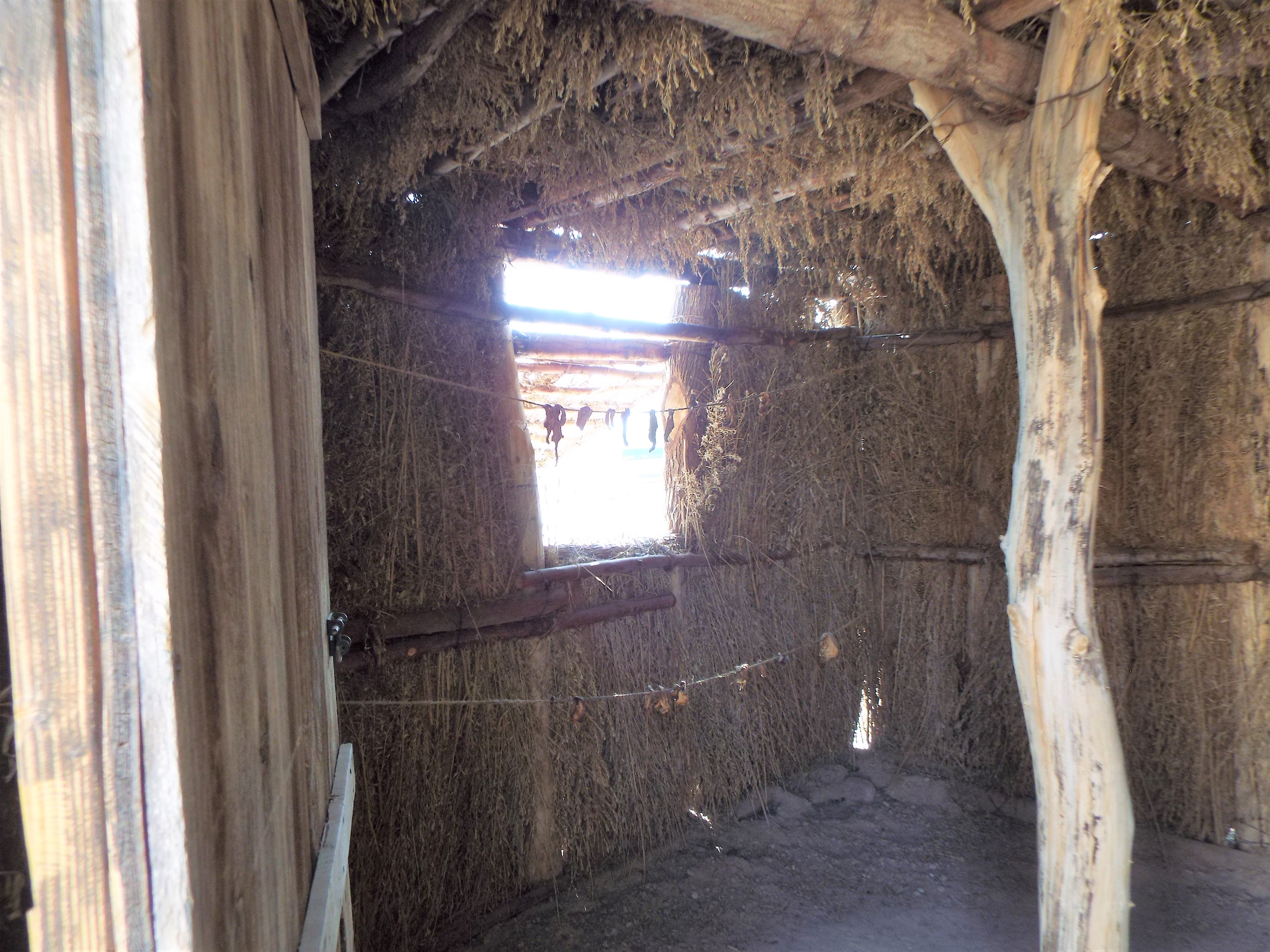
Interior the Cocopah dwelling

The Cocopah Indian Reservation was created in 1917 by executive order of US President Woodrow Wilson. Another Yuman group, the Quechan, lives in the adjacent Fort Yuma Indian Reservation.

In 1964, the tribe ratified its first constitution and established a tribal council. In 1985, the tribe received an additional 4,200 acres, including the northern portion of the reservation, through the Cocopah Land Acquisition Bill signed by President Ronald Reagan.

== 21st century ==
In 2022, containers were erected along the border with Mexico. They were erected by Arizona in response to the Mexico–United States border crisis. The tribe has protested the presence of the containers on their land. Disputes over construction of the Mexico–United States border wall in tribal land have been ongoing since 2020.
