= Cocopah =

Native Americans living in Baja California and Sonora, Mexico, and Arizona in the USA

Cocopah Xawiƚƚ kwñchawaay
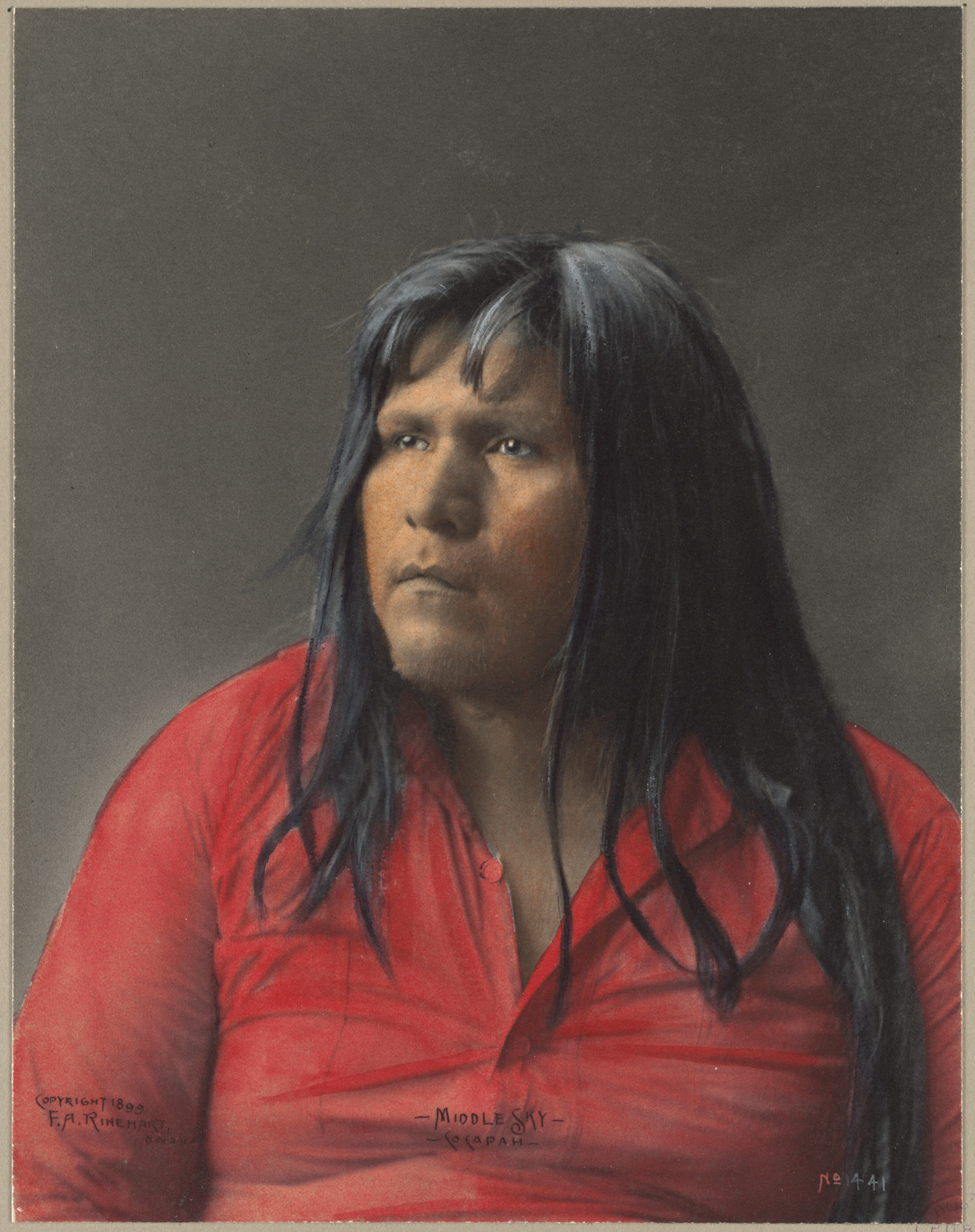
- Middle Sky, Cocapah, photo by Frank A. Rinehart, 1899 (hand-colored)

Total population
- 1,009 in the United States (2010)

Regions with significant populations
- Mexico (Baja California and Sonora); United States (Arizona)

Languages
- Cocopah, English, Spanish

Religion
- Traditional tribal religion

Related ethnic groups
- other Yuman peoples

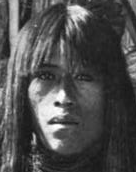
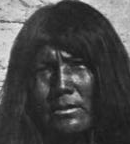
A Cocopah man and a Cocopah woman by Cyrus Thomas

The Cocopah (Cocopah: Xawiƚƚ Kwñchawaay) are Native Americans who live in Baja California, Mexico, and Arizona, United States.

In the United States, Cocopah people belong to the federally recognized Cocopah Tribe of Arizona.

== Name ==
The Cocopah are also called the Cucapá (in Cocopa: Kwapa or Kwii Capáy).

== Language ==
The Cocopah language belongs to the Delta–California branch of the Yuman family. Their self-designation is Xawiƚƚ kwñchawaay, translating to “Those Who Live on the Cloudy River” (from Xawíƚƚy - "river", kwii - "cloud", (ny)way - "to live", llyay/nyaam - "many"). According to the U.S. Census, there were 1,009 Cocopah in 2010.

Alternate spellings of Cocopah in Spanish documents include: Cócopa, Cócapa, Cócope, Cósopa, Cúcapa.

== History ==
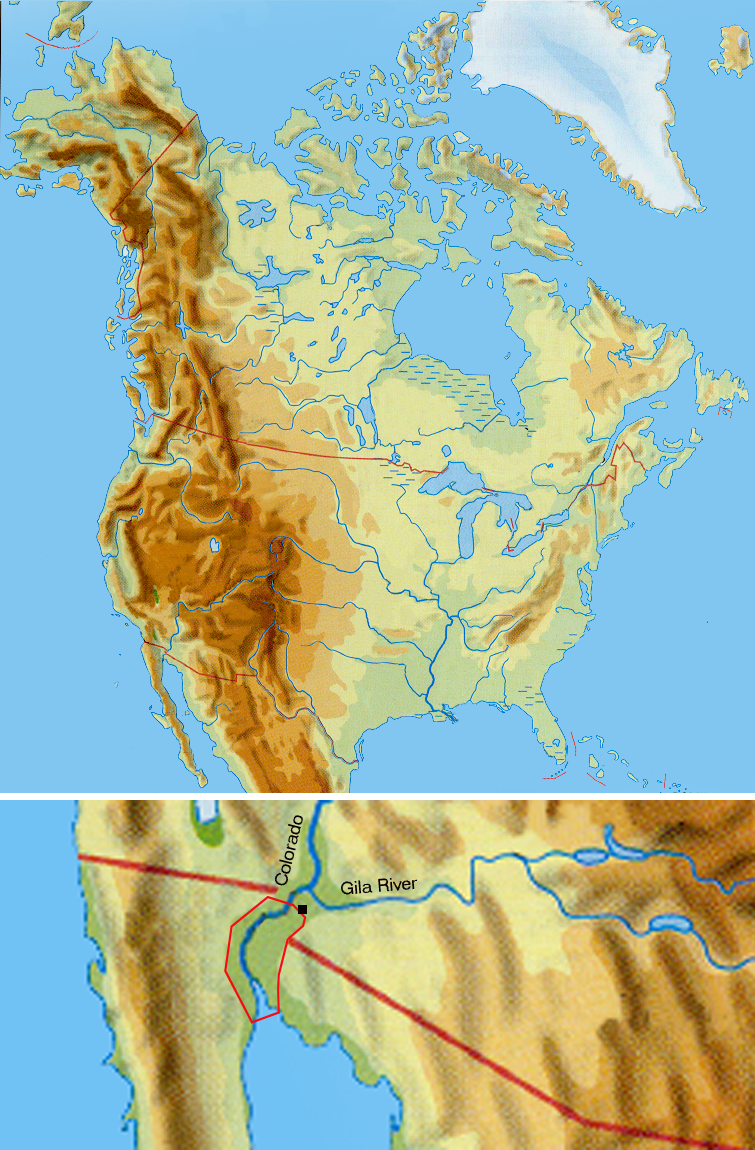
Cocopah traditional territory on the Colorado River and the Gulf of California

=== Precontact ===
Ancestors of the Cocopah inhabited parts of present-day Arizona, California, and Baja California and are known by western academics as belonging to the Patayan culture. Patayan is a term used by archaeologists to describe prehistoric Native American cultures who inhabited parts of modern-day Arizona, west to Lake Cahuilla in California, and in Baja California, between 700 and 1550 A.D. This included areas along the Gila River, Colorado River and in the Lower Colorado River Valley, the nearby uplands, and north to the vicinity of the Grand Canyon. They are mostly likely ancestors of the Cocopah and other Yuman-speaking tribes in the region. The Patayan peoples practiced floodplain agriculture where possible and relied heavily on hunting and gathering.

=== Post-contact ===
The first significant contact of the Cocopah with Europeans and Africans probably occurred in 1540, when the Spanish explorer Hernando de Alarcón sailed into the Colorado River delta. The Cocopah were specifically mentioned by name by the expedition of Juan de Oñate in 1605.

==== Post-Mexican cession ====
After the Mexican-American War, Cocopah lands were split between the U.S. and Mexico through the Mexican Cession resulting from the Treaty of Guadalupe Hidalgo.

Westward expansion in the 1840s and the discovery of gold in California in 1849 brought many migrants through the area near the mouth of the Colorado River and the Grand Canyon region. The strategic importance of the river crossing was recognized by the U.S. government, and the United States Army established Camp Independence in 1850 to protect the entry route through the tribe's territories. Many tribes along the Colorado River entered the ferry business given its profitability, creating many jobs for the Cocopah.

The Cocopah agreed to join Garra's Tax Revolt of 1851, led by the Cupeño, to fight against the U.S. government alongside the Quechan and nearby Kumeyaay bands. Together, the Cocopah sieged Camp Independence but the siege fell apart after disputes with the Quechan over the distribution of sheep confiscated from white sheepherders earlier.

The Cocopah also entered the Yuma War following the tax revolt initially on the side of the Quechan against the U.S. After making peace with the U.S., the Cocopah allied with the Paipai and Halyikwamai and turned against the Quechan, after accumulating tension between the two tribes. War broke out in May 1853, when the Cocopah besieged three Quechan villages holding them hostage. In retaliation, the Quechan-allied Mohave backed the Quechan and raided the Cocopah. The Yuma War came to an end when the U.S. threatened the Mojave that they would intervene on the side of the Cocopah.

==== Cocopah in the Mexican Revolution ====
During the Mexican Revolution, the Magonistas gained the support of the Cocopah, under the influence of Camilo Jiménez, who was the tribal leader of the Cocopah in the Mexicali Valley. The Cocopah were sympathetic of the Magonist struggle against imperialism from both Mexico and the U.S., and the privatized ownership of their land. The Cocopah were joined by the Paipai, Kiliwa, and Kumeyaay, and prepared to fight alongside the Magonistas, as Jiménez smuggled US arms to Mexico with the support of the Industrial Workers of the World (IWW).

On January 29, the Magonistas and the Cocopah captured Mexicali and provided further logistical support throughout their lands. Jiménez carried out a campaign with the Cocopah, Paipai, and Kiliwa armies from El Rosario to Ensenada, raiding small towns and looting Chinese-Mexican businesses.

The Cocopah were eventually defeated by the Mexican forces in the following months and were forced off of their land by the Colorado River Land Company.

==== Modern era ====
In 1964, the Cocopah Tribe of Arizona, on the U.S. side of the border, ratified its first constitution and formed a five-person Tribal Council in the Cocopah Indian Reservation. In the late 1970s and 1980s, the tribe acquired additional land, constructed homes, installed utilities, developed infrastructure, and initiated economic development.

Water resources developments along the Colorado River leading to a lowering of the Delta by 90% of its original size, the Cocopah Tribe of Baja California faced a depletion fishery resources upon which it heavily relied.

== Cocopah Tribe of Arizona ==
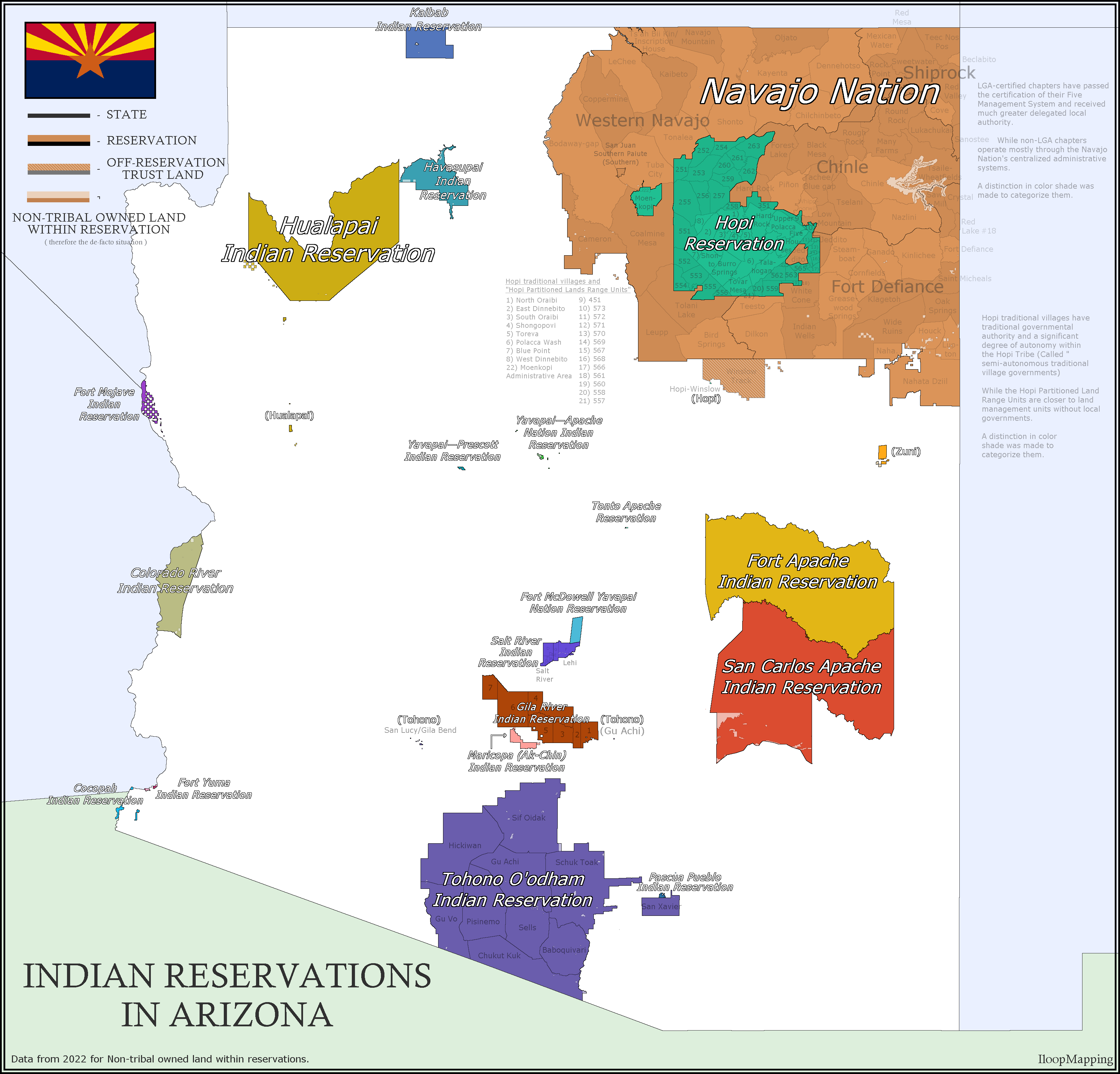
Map of the Cocopah Tribe and neighboring tribes.

Cocopah peoples in the United States are enrolled in the Cocopah Tribe of Arizona. As of the 2000 United States Census, the Cocopah Tribe of Arizona numbered 891 people. There is a casino, speedway, resort, family entertainment center and bingo hall on the reservation as well as a Museum and Cultural Center. Another Yuman group, the Quechan, lives in the adjacent Fort Yuma Indian Reservation. On important occasions, Cocopah people wear their customary ribbon shirts and ribbon dresses.

== Settlements ==
Cocopah people live in Mexicali Municipality, Baja California (settlements of Campo Camerina (Colonia Terrenos Indios), Campo del Prado (Colonia el Mayor), Campo Flores, Campo Sonora (Colonia Terrenos Indios), Colonia la Puerta, Comunidad Indígena Cucapá el Mayor [Ejido el Mayor], Ejido Cucapá Mestizo, Ejido Doctor Alberto Mota (El Indiviso), Ejido Durango, Ejido México, Familia Regalado (Ejido Sonora 2 Campos Nuevos), La Casa de las Curvas (Colonia el Mayor), Mexicali, Sainz Domínguez (Colonia el Mayor), and San Felipe) and San Luis Río Colorado Municipality, Sonora (settlements of Pozas de Arvizu (La Reserva), and San Luis Río Colorado), Mexico, and in Somerton, Arizona in the United States.
