= Salt River Pima–Maricopa Indian Community =

Native American tribe in Arizona

Coordinates: 33°31′13″N 111°47′36″W

Onk Akimel O'odham (O'odham) Xalychidom Piipaash (Maricopa)
- SRPMIC Seal

Total population
- 9,357

Regions with significant populations
- United States (Arizona)

Languages
- Akimel O’odham, Xalchidom Piipaash, and English

Religion
- Traditional beliefs, Christianity

Related ethnic groups
- other Akimel O’odham and Maricopa tribes, Tohono O'odham

Location of Salt River Pima – Maricopa Indian Community in Maricopa County, Arizona.

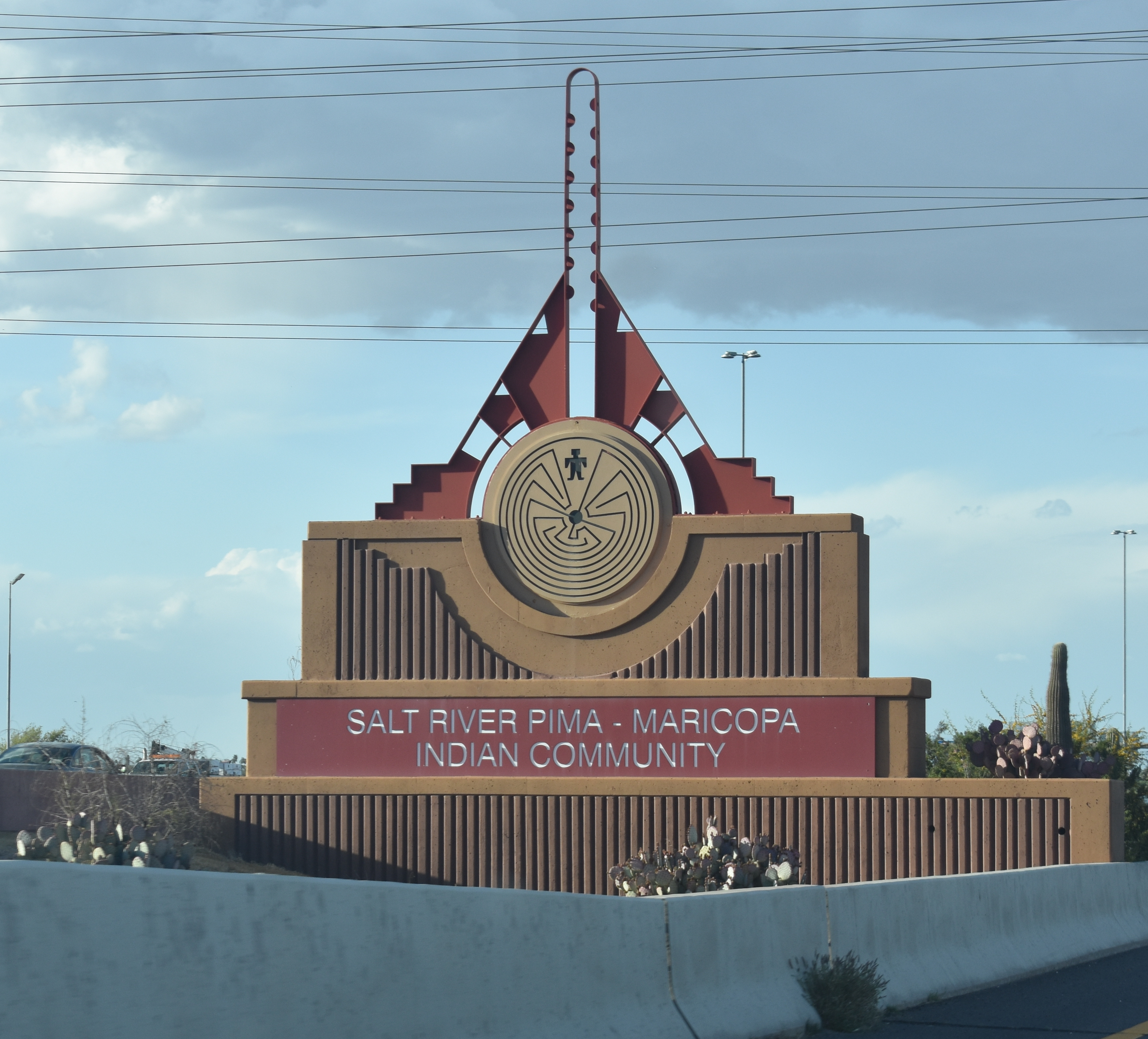
Sign viewed when entering the community through Loop 101.

Maricopa women gathering saguaro fruits, circa 1905

The Salt River Pima–Maricopa Indian Community (SRPMIC) comprises two distinct Native American tribes—the Pima (O'odham language: Onk Akimel O'odham, meaning "Salt River People") and the Maricopa (Maricopa language: Xalychidom Piipaash, meaning "people who live toward the water")—many of whom were originally part of the Halchidhoma (Xalchidom) tribe. The community was permanently created by an Executive Order of US President Rutherford B. Hayes on June 14, 1879. The community area includes 53,600 acres (217 km^{2}), of which 19,000 remain a natural preserve. As of 2022, the total population is 7,386. The community is a federally recognized tribe located in Arizona.

The community borders the Arizona cities of Scottsdale, Mesa, Tempe, and Fountain Hills.

The Great Seal of the Salt River Pima–Maricopa Indian Community is a representation of I'itoi, commonly referred to as the Man in the Maze.

== History ==
The O'odham (Pima) and Pipaash (Maricopa) peoples lived in villages along the Gila River when settlers began to arrive. Due to the settlers removing so much water from the upstream of the River, many O'odham migrated to the Salt River Valley where there was relatively more water. Conflicts over resources and hostility between the settlers and O'odham resulted in the government establishing the reservation "as a temporary measure to protect Indian rights."

== Business enterprises ==
Since the late 20th century, the community has owned and operated two casinos on its land (Talking Stick Resort), both operating under the Casino Arizona brand name. The facilities attract gamblers from the local Phoenix area as well as out-of-state tourists.

In February 2011, the community opened the first Major League Baseball spring training facility on Indian land, Salt River Fields at Talking Stick. This 140-acre (57 ha) baseball complex is the spring training home of the Arizona Diamondbacks and Colorado Rockies. It is also the home field of several Minor League Baseball teams affiliated with the Diamondbacks and Rockies, including the rookie-level ACL Diamondbacks and ACL Rockies of the Arizona Complex League, and the Salt River Rafters of the Arizona Fall League.

The community owns and operates the Phoenix Cement Company, which supplies northern Arizona and Phoenix with cement and related products. The company's plant, one of only two large cement manufacturers in Arizona, is in Clarkdale.

The eastern leg of the Loop 101 freeway (Pima freeway) passes through the western edge of the community in a north/south alignment. Both sides of the freeway and all four corners of each interchange within the community are in the domain of the community for development purposes. The alignment of the freeway across community land was a contentious issue within the community and between the community and local and state transportation officials throughout the 1980s.

The streets and roads in the community generally follow the same street grid of the surrounding cities in the Phoenix metropolitan area, such as Phoenix, Scottsdale, and Mesa. Most are two-lane rural roads and are widened somewhat in certain spots to serve vehicular traffic for the casinos and other business enterprises.

== Government ==
The Salt River community is governed by an elected President, Vice President, and Tribal Council after the tribe adopted its own 1940 constitution under the federal Indian Reorganization Act (IRA) of June 18, 1934. Current President and Vice President are Martin Harvier and Ricardo Leonard, respectively. Current council members include David Antone; Cheryl Doka; Jacob Butler, Sr.; Mikah Carlos; Deanna Scabby; Michael Dallas, Sr.; and Su:k Fulwilder.

== Man in the Maze ==
Central to the beliefs of the Salt River Pima–Maricopa Indian Community is the story of the Man in the Maze, or I'itoi ki:k, which is the symbol seen on the great seal. This ancient pattern (visible at the right) is representative of the journey a person makes through life, including obstacles and problems. The figure is called Elder Brother and he is about to make his way through the maze. At the center, he will find the Sun God, who is there to greet him and bless him into the next world. The symbol belongs to the Akimel O’odham (Pima), Pee-Posh (Maricopa), and Tohono O'odham tribes and is traditionally represented in ancient petroglyphs and traditional basket designs.

== Education ==
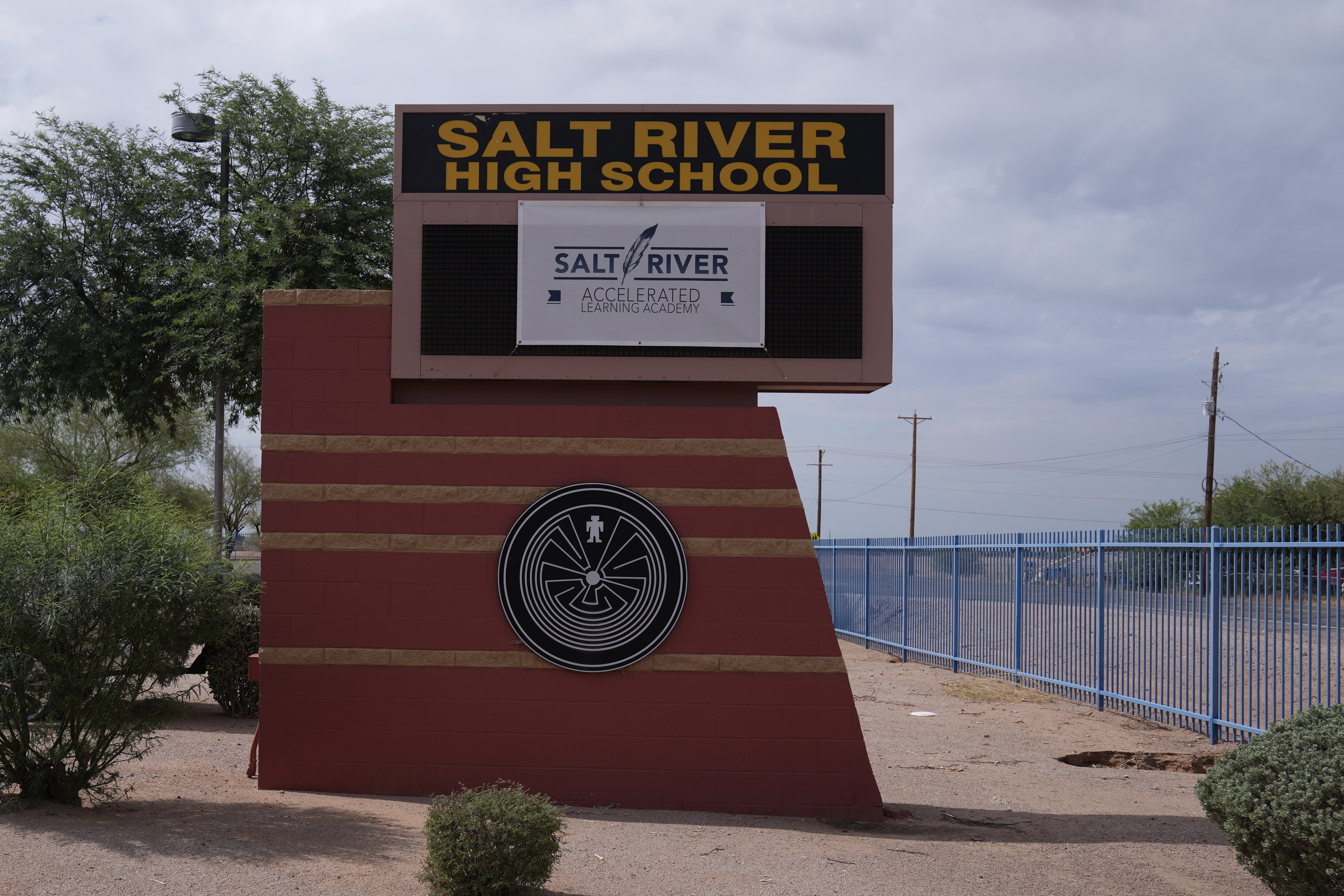
Salt River Accelerated Learning Academy, formerly Salt River High School

There is a tribal elementary school, Salt River Elementary School, affiliated with the Bureau of Indian Education (BIE). Public school districts incorporating parts of the reservation include Mesa Public Schools, with Westwood High School being the zoned high school.

Prior to 1974 the Scottsdale Unified School District accepted students from the reservation. In 1965 400 students attended the Mesa school district facilities. In 1974 the Scottsdale district began rejecting residents of the reservation. In 2000, a total of 1,120 students from the reservation attended Mesa schools.

Some time prior to 2000, the Bureau of Indian Affairs (BIA) operated the Salt River tribal school, but it later became tribally controlled.

A charter school with secondary students, Desert Eagle School, opened in 1995. Desert Eagle was converted into Salt River High School, which opened in 2004.

The tribal elementary school and Salt River Accelerated Learning Academy, a charter high school, which functions as an alternative school for students deemed "at-risk", are, along with the former Salt River High School, part of the Salt River Pima-Maricopa Community Schools system, or Salt River Schools. All of the schools have coursework related to the Maricopa (Piipaash) and O'odham peoples. In particular, in 2020, students in the seventh grade took mandatory O'odham language classes.

== Church of Jesus Christ of Latter-day Saints ==
The Salt River Pima-Maricopa Indian community is home to the oldest continuous Native American congregation of the Church of Jesus Christ of Latter-day Saints (the Papago ward). In 1997, the church building was rededicated with a ceremony. The newly renovated LDS Mesa Temple Visitors' Center includes a display of the history of the origins of the Salt River community.
