= Maricopa people =

Native American tribe

Maricopa
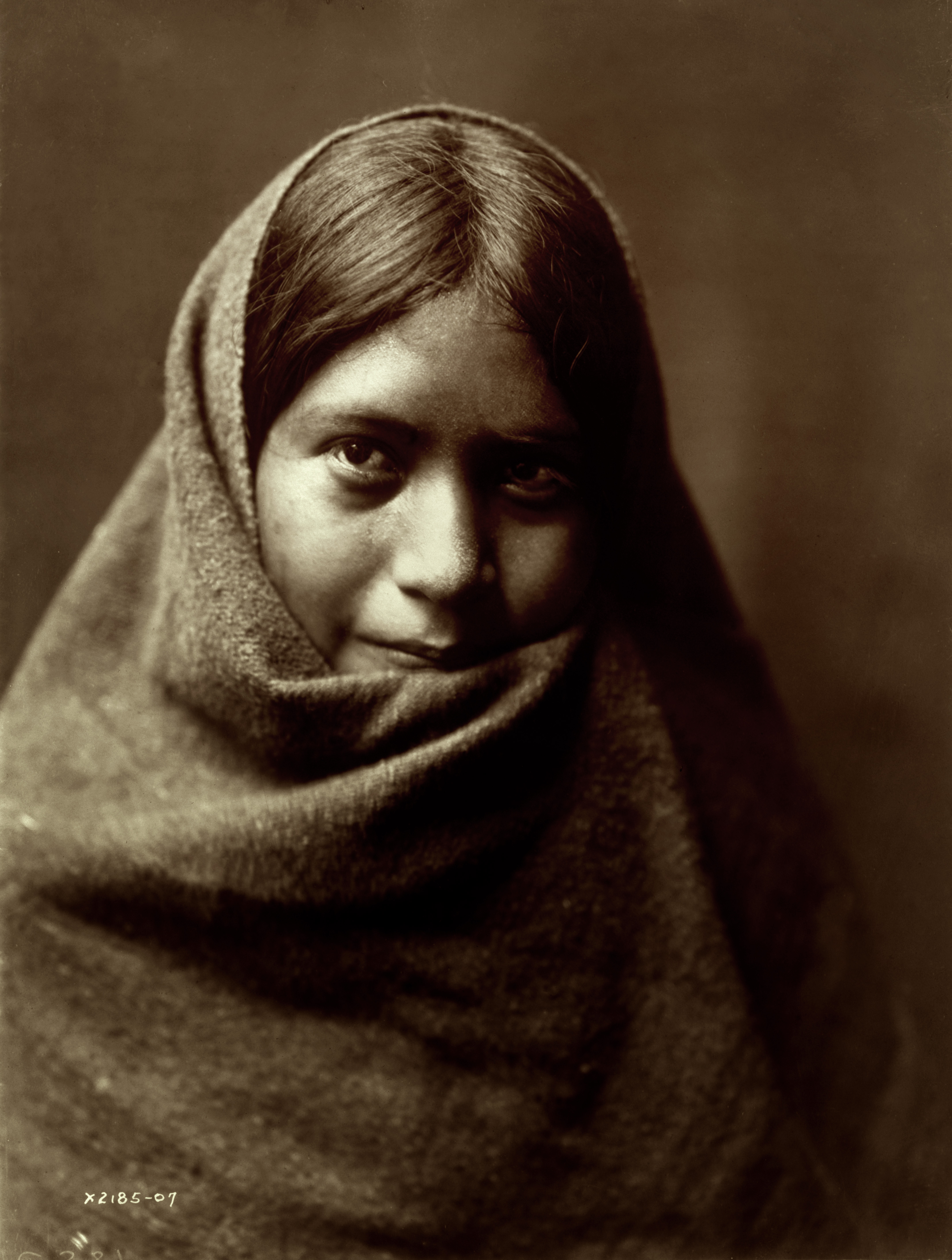
- Pakit, a young Maricopa woman, 1907

Total population
- 805 (2015 census)

Regions with significant populations
- United States (Arizona)

Languages
- Maricopa, English

Religion
- Traditional tribal religion, Christianity

Related ethnic groups
- Yuman peoples

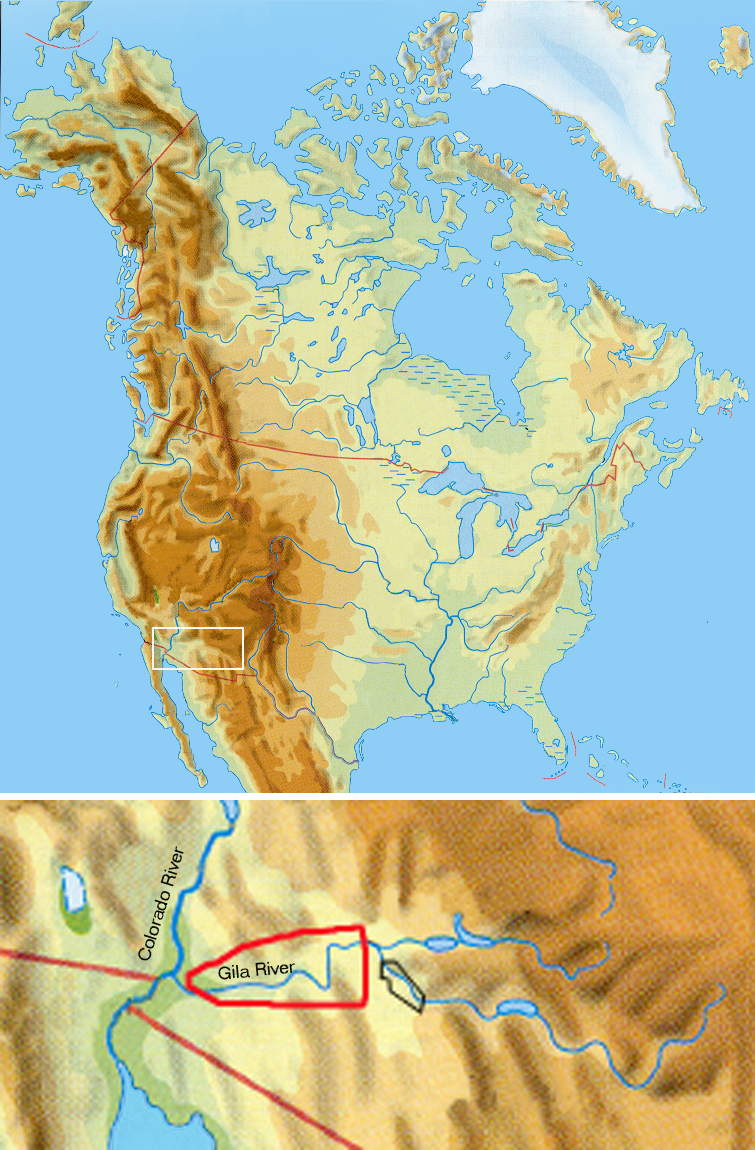
Maricopa

The Maricopa (/ˌmɛrɪˈkoʊpə/) or Piipaash (Maricopa pronunciation: [pˈiːpˈɑːʃ]) are a Native American tribe, who live in the Salt River Pima-Maricopa Indian Community and Gila River Indian Community (both in Arizona) along with the Akimel O'odham (Pima), a tribe with whom the Maricopa have long held a positive relationship. The Maricopa at the Salt River Pima-Maricopa Indian Community consist mostly of Xalychidom Piipaash members and are concentrated in Lehi. The Maricopa at the Gila River Indian Community are concentrated in Maricopa Colony. The Maricopa are a River Yuman group, formerly living along the banks of the Colorado River.

== Names ==
The neighboring Akimel O'odham (Pima) and future allies, called these people the Kokmalik'op ('enemies in the big mountains'),. The Spanish transliterated this to Maricopa. They call themselves Piipaa, Piipaash or Pee-Posh (″people″).

The "Maricopa" (Note: Alternate spellings in Spanish accounts include: Cocomaricopa, Opa, Cocomaripopa, Cocomarizopa, Comariapa, Comaricopa.) of the American explorers of the 19th century at this time consisted of descendants of five (possibly six) originally independent River Yuma tribes (see Spier, 1933: 1-41): the "Maricopa/Piipaash"-speaking original Piipaash together with the Halchidhoma, Kavelchadom and Opa/Piipaa Nyaa as well as the "Delta Yuma/Cocopa"-speaking Halyikwamai and Kohuana/Kahwan.

Since in the 19th century the two originally "Delta Yuma/Cocopa"-speaking "Halyikwamai" and "Kohuana/Kahwan" lived together with four "Maricopa/Piipaash"-speaking "Piipaash", "Halchidhoma", "Kavelchadom" and "Opa/Piipaa Nyaa" along the Gila and Salt Rivers in several villages for mutual protection, these river Yuma groups and their languages/dialects used to be mistakenly referred to by Spaniards and Mexicans as "Cocomaricopa" and "Opa" respectively.

Only the descendants of the "Piipaash" and "Halchidhoma" (Xalychidom Piipaa / Xalychidom Piipaash - ″people who live toward the water″) were able to preserve their own tribal identity and refer to themselves in English as "Maricopa" or "Maricopa of Lehi", the descendants of the other three (possibly four) River Yuma tribes, which found shelter on the Gila River and Salt River under the "Piipaash" in the 19th century - the "Kavelchadom" (Kavelchadom Piipaash / Kavelchidom Piipaash - "downstream person/people", "river people in the west"), "Opa/Piipaa Nyaa" (Piipaa Nyaa / Thxpaa Nyaa - "eastern people"), "Halyikwamai" (Xalykawaam) and "Kohuana/Kahwan" (Kaxwaan - "river people") – however, have not been able to preserve their own language as well as their separate identity and now generally identify themselves as "Maricopa".

== History ==
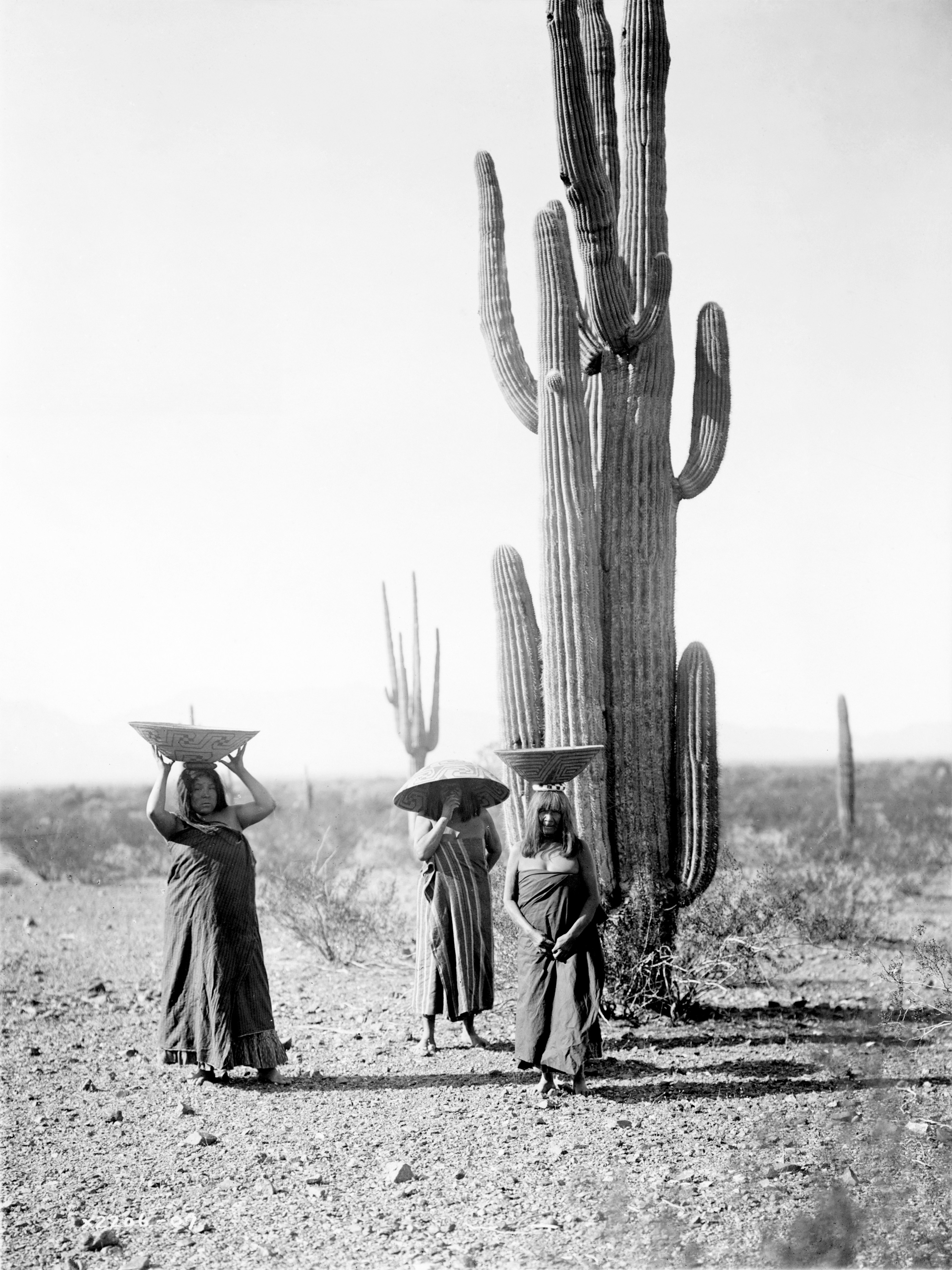
Saguaro gatherers, Maricopa, Arizona, 1907

They formerly consisted of small groups of people who lived for generations along the banks of the Colorado River. In the 16th century, they migrated to the area around the Gila River, to avoid attacks by the Quechan and Mojave peoples.

During the 1840s, epidemics of new infectious diseases took a toll on the tribe.

In 1825 a party of American trappers, James Ohio Pattie among them, massacred a group of 200 Maricopa in revenge for an earlier attack.

In the 19th century, the Maricopa formed a confederation with the Akimel O'odham, and in 1857 they successfully defeated the Quechan and Mojave at the Battle of Pima Butte near Maricopa Wells. They became successful farmers, and in 1870, they produced three million pounds of wheat. Drought and water diversion by non-Indians brought widespread crop failures.

In the 19th and the 20th centuries, the Bureau of Indian Affairs implemented policies to try to assimilate the Maricopa into mainstream European-American society, and they brought Presbyterian missionaries into the communities. In 1914, the US federal government broke up communal tribal landholdings for distribution as individual allotments in order to encourage subsistence farming according to the European-American model. It was not appropriate for the geography and climate here. The Pima Advisory Council was formed by the BIA in 1926 to speak on behalf of the Akimel O'odham and Maricopa communities. Following congressional passage of the Indian Reorganization Act of 1934, in 1936 the Akimel O'odham and Maricopa agreed on a constitution to restore some measure of self-governance.

Through the 1930s, surface flow on the Gila River was reduced to nothing, and the tribe suffered greatly due to the loss of their river. But the BIA ignored water issues. The tribe resorted to using brackish well water, but it would not support growing edible crops. They began to cultivate cotton as a commodity crop.

== Language ==
Their heritage language are/were dialects of the Maricopa and Cocopah language, which belong to the Yuman language family.

== Arts ==
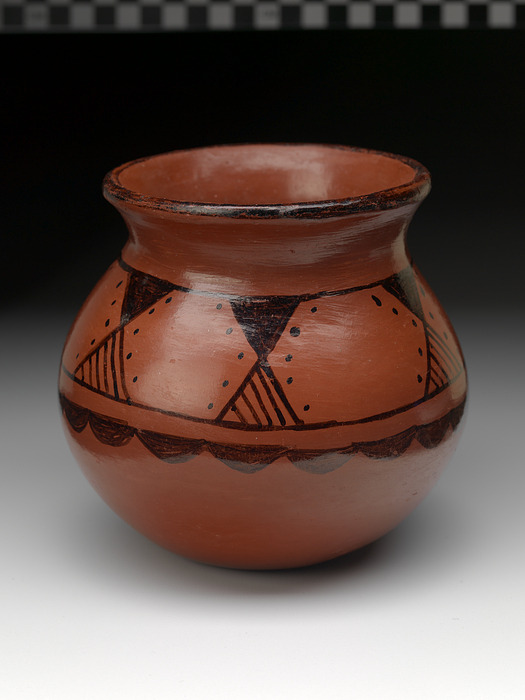
Redware pot by Piipaash (Maricopa) artist Barbara Johnson

The Maricopa are known for their basket weaving and textiles, and in particular for their highly burnished red-on-redware pottery. Their traditional pottery practices enjoyed a revival from 1937 to 1940. Elizabeth Hart, a US Home Extension Agent, worked with a leading Maricopa potter, Ida Redbird, to form the Maricopa Pottery Cooperative. Redbird served as president of the cooperative, which had 17 to 19 master potters. Hart encouraged members to sign their work. Swastikas were a common traditional motif that was abandoned in the 1940s, due to the Nazi usurpation of the symbol. The paddle and anvil method of construction is used, and, while utilitarian cookware is tempered, decorative Maricopa pottery has no temper.

== Notable Maricopa ==
- Ida Redbird (1892–1971) – Master potter of the Maricopa; instrumental in the 1937–1940 Maricopa pottery revival; first president of Maricopa Pottery Makers Association; translator and informant for Leslie Spier's Yuma Tribes of the Gila River, thus helping to preserve her American Indian heritage.
- Robert Tree Cody (1951–2023) – Flutist. He was also an enrolled member of the Hunkpapa tribe.
- Beulah Archuletta (1909–1969), née Donahue, was an actress.
- Juan Chivaria (also spelled as: Chavarria, Cheveria, Chaverria), the last Maricopa chief who got mustered in Company C along with the last O'odham leader, Chief Antonio Azul, who led Company B. They both protected Arizona Territory in 1860s as well as their traditional homelands.

== See also ==
- Halchidhoma, a band that joined the Maricopa
