= Cocopah language =

Delta language spoken in Mexico and US

Cocopah
- Kwikapa
- Native to: Mexico, United States
- Region: Baja California, Arizona, Sonora
- Ethnicity: Cocopah
- Native speakers: US: 370 (2015); Mexico: 180 (2020)
- Language family: Yuman–Cochimí: Core Yuman; Delta–Californian; Cocopah

Language codes
- ISO 639-3: coc
- Glottolog: coco1261
- ELP: Cocopah
- Cocopa is classified as Definitely Endangered by the UNESCO Atlas of the World's Languages in Danger.

Cocopah is a Delta language of the Yuman language family spoken by the Cocopah. Cocopah is believed to have derived from the Hokan language, and it is related to the other Native American languages of Mojave and Kumeyaay. Cocopah is considered an endangered language, with fewer than 400 speakers at the turn of the 21st century. However, in an effort to keep the language alive, Yuma County's Cocopah Museum began offering classes teaching Cocopah to children in 1998.

== History ==
Much of the Cocopah language was passed down through speaking, rather than through writing. This, in large part, is because the language did not have an alphabet for the majority of its existence. It was not until the 1970s that a written language was developed, when a scholar decided to approach this task for a dissertation. Although the creation of an alphabet was useful, the original proved to be less than ideal, and so a new one was developed by the tribe in the early 2000s. As the revival of the language progressed, it became apparent that the language did not have words to fit the advances made in modern society. In turn, the tribe developed new words to attribute to modern objects that did not exist in the ancient language. The elders of the tribe were given the responsibility of developing these new words and/or phrases.

While the Cocopah tribe inhabits parts of Arizona and parts of Mexico, the written language differs based on the location of the tribe. For instance, Cocopah in Mexico use a different orthography than Cocopah in Arizona. The Mexican-based Cocopah use an orthography that was designed by the INALI, an organization that examines and protects the rights of endangered languages.

== Phonology ==
=== Consonants ===
Cocopah has 21 consonants:

	Bilabial	Alveolar		Retroflex	Palatal		Velar		Glottal
	Bilabial	plain	lateral	Retroflex	plain	lateral	plain	labial	Glottal
Nasal	m	n			ɲ				
Stop	p	t		ʈ	tʃ		k	kʷ	ʔ
Fricative		s		ʂ	ʃ	ɬʲ	x	xʷ	
Approximant			l		j	lʲ		w	
Trill		r							

- /r/ is usually a trill [r] but sometimes is a flap [ɾ].
- /tʃ, ɲ, ʃ/ are postalveolar (palato-alveolar). /lʲ, ɬʲ/ are palatalized alveolar consonants.
- /ɬʲ/ is usually palatalized, but unlike /lʲ/ it does not contrast with a non-palatalized [ɬ].

=== Vowels ===
Cocopah has 4 vowels.

	Front	Back
Close	i / iː	u / uː
Mid	e / eː	
Open	a / aː	

Cocopah has both short and long vowels.

=== Syllable and phonotactics ===
The Cocopah syllable:

(C)(C)(C)V(ː)(C)(C)

- Word-initial two-consonant clusters usually consist of a fricative plus another consonant, e.g. /sp, ʂm, ʃp, xt͡ʃ/. Rarer two-consonant clusters start with a lateral or a stop consonant, e.g. /lt͡ʃ, ɬʲt͡ʃ, ps, t͡ʃp/.
- Three-consonant clusters are rare, recorded examples include /pxk, pxkʷ, spx/.

== See also ==
- Cocopah Tribe of Arizona

== Bibliography ==
- Crawford, James M. (1970). "Cocopa Baby Talk". International Journal of American Linguistics. 36: 9–13. doi:10.1086/465083. S2CID 144118246.
- Crawford, James M. (1978). "More on Cocopa Baby Talk". International Journal of American Linguistics. 44: 17–23. doi:10.1086/465514. S2CID 145412999.
- Crawford, James M. (1983). Cocopa Texts. University of California Publications in Linguistics. Vol. 100. Berkeley: University of California Press. ISBN 0-520-09652-5.
- Crawford, James M. (1989). Cocopa Dictionary. University of California Publications in Linguistics. Vol. 114. Berkeley: University of California Press. ISBN 0-520-09749-1.
- Crawford, James M. (1998). "Classificatory Verbs in Cocopa". In Hinton, L.; Munro, P. (eds.). American Indian Languages: Description and Theory. Berkeley: University of California. pp. 5–9.
- Mithun, Marianne (1999). The Languages of Native North America. Cambridge: Cambridge University Press. ISBN 0-521-23228-7.
- Wares, Alan C. (1968). "The Phonemes of Cocopa". A Comparative Study of Yuman Consonantism. Janua Linguarum, Series Practica. Vol. 57. The Hauge: Mouton. pp. 37–38. doi:10.1515/9783111659077.37. ISBN 978-3-11-127469-0.

== Sources ==
- Lenguas indígenas y hablantes de 3 años y más, 2020 INEGI. Censo de Población y Vivienda 2020.
