= Sacate, Arizona =

Pima village, railroad siding, Catholic mission

- Populated place
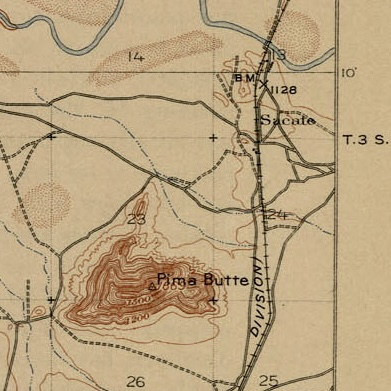
- Sacate, Arizona c. 1913 (USGS Maricopa quadrangle, map held at Perry-Castañeda Library)

- Location within the state of Arizona Sacate (the United States)
- Coordinates: 33.177222°N 112.080833°W
- Country: United States
- State: Arizona
- County: Pinal
- Elevation: 1,093 ft (333 m)
- Time zone: UTC-7 (Mountain (MST))
  - Summer (DST): UTC-7 (MST)
- ZIP codes: 86326
- Area code: 520
- FIPS code: 04-61710
- GNIS feature ID: 25339

Sacate is a populated place in the Middle Gila River Valley area, within Pinal County, Arizona, United States. Located 8 mi (13 km) north of Maricopa on the south side of the Gila River near Pima Butte, Sacate was a Pima village, a railroad station of the Southern Pacific Railroad, and a Catholic mission. It had originally been called Sacaton Station but the name was shortened to its current version in 1904.

This town and neighboring communities and landmarks with similar names were all likely derived from Spanish, specifically the records of Spaniard Francisco Garcés who visited the area in 1775–76, and described the grasslands of the area using the word sácate or sácaton: "Zácate, more frequently sácate, from the Nahuatl çacatl, is the usual name for grass such as horses and cattle eat, also called indifferently by Garcés pastos and pasturas, pasturage, forage, herbage. Such 'grass' is distinguished from sácaton, the tall rank herbage, such as reeds, rushes, and the like, unfit for forage." A place called Sacate was the site of the Battle of Pima Butte between Yuma and Maricopa Indians in 1857–58.

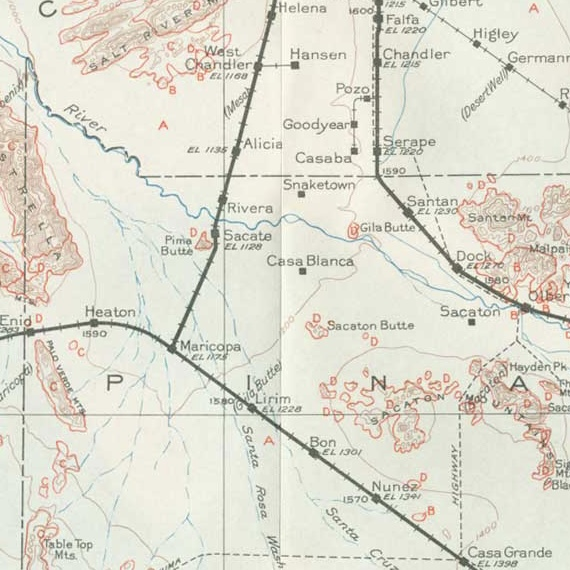
Sacate along the railroad between Maricopa and Phoenix circa 1933

As a 1920 Department of Agriculture report noted, "Cities and towns in the Middle Gila Valley are few and small..." Sacate was originally a station along the Maricopa and Phoenix Railroad, laid out in 1887. According to the U.S. Geological Survey, "The lines west of El Paso were built in separate portions by local Southern Pacific organizations, since 1902 combined in the one general company. The [first Southern Pacific] tracks were laid from Yuma to El Paso in 1879-81." Southern Pacific applied to abandon the line in 1934.

In the late 1800s, colonial settlement of Arizona Territory changed the hydrology of the Gila River valley, disrupting traditional agricultural and irrigation systems. The people of what is now Gila River Indian Community turned to harvesting firewood for sale: "A local newspaper reported in 1901 that more than 30,000 cords of mesquite were stacked at Sacaton Station...Over a span of a dozen years we cut nearly 100,000 acres of mesquite trees so we could feed our families; many of these trees never came back due to the lack of water." Circa 1904 a U.S. Geological Survey report stated that there were about 2,800 Pima living east of the railroad and that they had been suffering from a severe water shortage/drought since 1890.

A 1901 guidebook for travelers to Arizona Territory described the scenery along the rail route:

The traveler on the Southern Pacific leaves his train at Maricopa. It is only a matter of thirty-five miles to get to Phoenix from the main line of the Sunset Route. The Gila River and a curious Indian settlement are soon passed. A half-hour more and an irrigation canal is crossed. Above the ditch is the unbroken plain, greasewood and cactus and sage its sparse vegetation. But this is passed, and now for miles the train speeds through avenues of cottonwood trees, by alfalfa fields of deepest emerald that stretch away to the very horizon east and west, past orchards and vineyards, through Tempe, a prosperous town, and across a great bridge that spans the Salt river's channel.

At some point between 1906 and 1915, Sacate was the site of a gunfight in which Maricopa Slim killed two or more Mexicans.

By 1915–16 it was known as Sacate Siding, along what had become Arizona Eastern Railway. Sacate Siding had no post office. The only business listing was Phoenix Wood & Coal Co. In 1917 Phoenix Wood & Coal was entertaining the idea of buying mesquite beans from Sacaton Reservation vendors in case of wartime food shortages, but there was an open question of locating a mill for mass production of mesquite flour.

Other Pima villages in the vicinity of Sacate circa 1921 were Vah-Ki, Bapchule, Casa Blanca, and Sweetwater, all on the south side of the river before heading east before reaching the site of the Pima "Indian agency" at Sacaton.

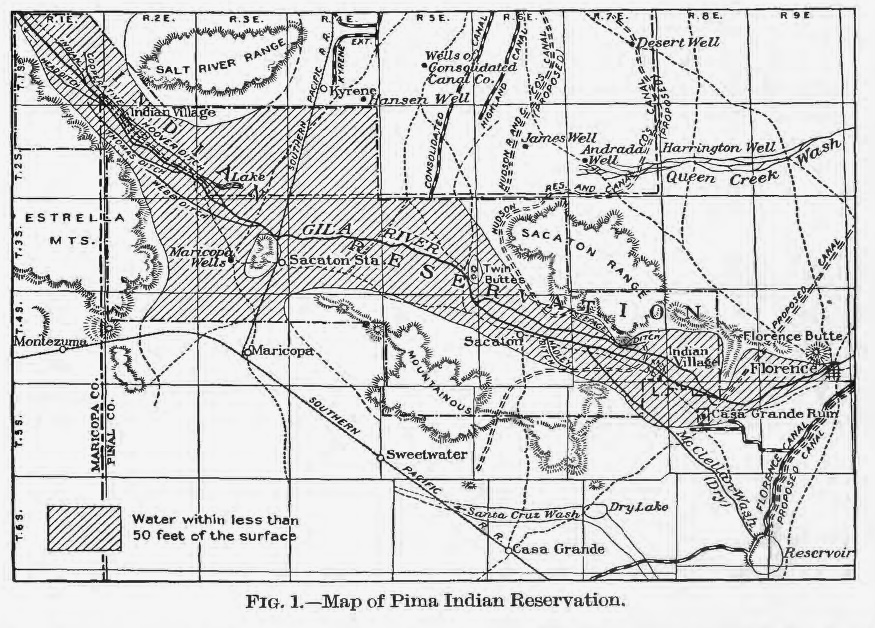
1904 map of Pima Indian Reservation showing locations of Sacaton station versus Sacaton

In 1936 the population was 12 people, mail would be delivered to Maricopa, and the nearest parish church with a resident pastor was 13 mi (21 km) to the northwest in Komatke. A Franciscan friar named Father Antoine ran the St. Francis in the Desert mission at Sacate in 1941. James Stevens, sometimes called Jimmy, an Apache artist who married a Pima, painted murals inside the church at Father Antoine's mission as well as several other mission churches in the area. Sacate Catholic Day School, serving the Pima-Papago people of the area, operated at the mission from 1930 until 1969. The priest in 1965 was Rev. Celestine Chinn. Stevens' murals were destroyed when the church building burned down in 1993. There is a cemetery in Sacate.

Sacate is listed as part of the medically underserved settlement of the Gila River Indian Community, along with Bapchule, Blackwater, Burns, Camp Rivers, Casa Blanca, Co-Op Village, Cottonwood, Dock, Firebird Lake, Gila Crossing, Gila River Indian Reservation, Komatke, Lone Butte Ranch, Maricopa Village, Morgans Ferry, Olberg, Poston, and Sacaton. Sacate has an estimated elevation of 1,093 feet (333 m) above sea level.

== See also ==
- Sacaton (village) and Pima Villages
- Sacate Village, Arizona
- Socatoon Station, a stagecoach stop possibly located near Sacate
- Maricopa Wells, Arizona, described as eight miles north of Maricopa near Pima Butte
- Southern Pacific Railroad Depot (Casa Grande, Arizona)
- Deer Valley Petroglyph Preserve
- Painted Rock Petroglyph Site
