= Sacate Village, Arizona =

CDP in Pinal County, Arizona

- CDP
- Location of Sacate Village in Pinal County, Arizona.

- Location in the United States Sacate Village, Arizona (the United States)
- Coordinates: 33°8′30″N 111°58′52″W
- Country: United States
- State: Arizona
- County: Pinal

Area
  - Total: 2.97 sq mi (7.68 km^{2})
  - Land: 2.97 sq mi (7.68 km^{2})
  - Water: 0 sq mi (0.00 km^{2})

Population (2020)
  - Total: 260
  - Density: 87.7/sq mi (33.85/km^{2})
- Time zone: UTC-7 (MST (no DST))
- FIPS code: 04-61715

Sacate Village is a census-designated place in Pinal County, in the U.S. state of Arizona. The population was 169 at the 2010 census.

== Demographics ==
Historical population
Census	Pop.	Note	%±
2010	169		—
2020	260		53.8%
U.S. Decennial Census

== See also ==
- Sacaton (village) and Pima Villages
- Sacate, Arizona
- Sacaton, Arizona, capital of the Gila River Indian Community
- Socatoon Station, a stagecoach stop possibly located near Sacate
- Maricopa Wells, Arizona, described as eight miles north of Maricopa near Pima Butte
- Southern Pacific Railroad Depot (Casa Grande, Arizona)
- Deer Valley Petroglyph Preserve
- Painted Rock Petroglyph Site
