= Hormiguero =

Hormiguero is the Spanish word for anthill. It may refer to:

- Hormiguero, Arizona, one of the 19th century Gila River Pima Villages.
- El Hormiguero, a popular Spanish television program that airs on Antena 3.
- Hormigueros, Puerto Rico, a municipality located in the western region of the island.
- An area of Cienfuegos, Cuba.
- Hormiguero, Mexico an Archeological site associated with the Maya civilization of pre-Columbian Mesoamerica.
- Hormiguero, Nicaragua (also referred to as El Hormiguero), a small village in northeastern Nicaragua.
