= Aranca (disambiguation) =

Aranca may refer to:

- Aranca, a river in the Banat region of Romania and Serbia
- Two 19th century Pima Villages:
  - Arenal, Arizona (Aranca No. 1)
  - Aranca No. 2
