= Socatoon Station =

Butterfield Overland Mail stagecoach stop in Arizona

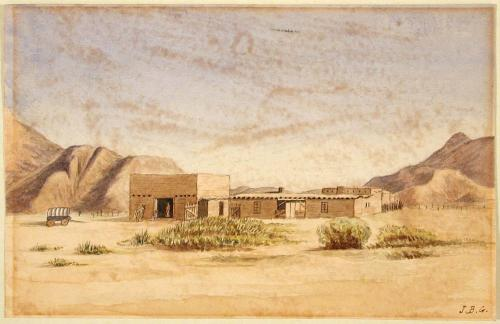
"Sacaton Stage Station near the Pima Villages, Arizona", 1876 watercolor by Joseph Basil Girard (Huntington Museum collection)

Socatoon Station was a stagecoach station of the Butterfield Overland Mail between 1858 and 1861. It was located four miles (6.4 km) east of Sacaton at a Maricopa village from which it took its name. This station was located 22 miles (35 km) east of Maricopa Wells Station, 11 miles (18 km) east of Casa Blanca Station and 13 miles (21 km) north of Oneida Station.

The location of the station was on the route of the Southern Emigrant Trail at the first camp on the Gila River after crossing the desert from Tucson. It was a stopping place for the San Antonio-San Diego Mail Line in 1857–58 before becoming the site of a Butterfield station. After the Civil War, it was again used as a stage station by other stage lines.

== See also ==
- Pima villages
- Sacate, Arizona
