= Fort Barrett =

Temporary Civil War fort in Arizona

- Bapchule, Arizona

Site information
- Type: Army fortification
- Controlled by: Arizona

Location
- Coordinates: 33°07′13″N 111°53′17″W

Site history
- Built: 1862
- Built by: United States
- In use: 1862
- Battles/wars: American Civil War

Garrison information
- Past commanders: (United States) James H. Carleton
- Occupants: United States Army

Fort Barrett was a temporary earthwork built by the United States Army's California Column in 1862 during the American Civil War. It was located in the Pima Villages two miles from the Gila River nearby Casa Blanca, New Mexico Territory and was built around the mill of settler Ammi M. White to protect it and provide a safe location to gather food and forage from the Pima people for the advance on Tucson. The fort was named after Lieutenant James Barrett who was killed in the Battle of Picacho Peak. Following the capture of Tucson in May the construction of the post ceased, and was abandoned, except as a post for vedettes and express riders.
