= Agua Raiz =

19th century Pima Village in Pinal County, Arizona

Agua Raiz, Spanish for "Water root" as named in the 1860 Census, it was one of the 19th century Pima Villages, located along the Gila River, near the modern site of Sacate Village, Arizona in what is now the Gila River Indian Community in Pinal County, Arizona.

== Demographics ==
Historical population
Census	Pop.	Note	%±
1860	523		—
U.S. Decennial Census

Agua Raiz appeared once on the 1860 U.S. Census in what was then Arizona County, New Mexico Territory. It was identified as "Aqua Rais" with a population of 523, all Pima Indians. It was the 3rd largest community recorded (2nd largest native village behind Arenal) in Arizona County (Tucson being the largest).

== History ==
Agua Raiz was first referred to as La Agua in a Mexican army report in 1825, and it had a population of 600 Pima people. It was named Arizo del Aqua in the Indian Agency census of 1858 and 1859, possibly a mistake of Rizo del Agua, "Ripple of the Water", it had a population of 770 (1858) and 518 (1859). It had a population of 523 in the official 1860 Census.
