= Hueso =

Hueso may refer to:

- Ben Hueso (born 1969), American politician
- Cayo Hueso, Spanish name for Key West, Florida, US
- Cayo Hueso, Havana, consejo popular (ward) in Havana, Cuba
- Hueso Parado, village in Arizona, US
- Manuel Vázquez Hueso (born 1981), Spanish road racing cyclist
- Palo y hueso, 1968 Argentine film
