= Gila River Indian Reservation =

Indian reservation in Arizona

Coordinates: 33°09′16″N 111°55′36″W

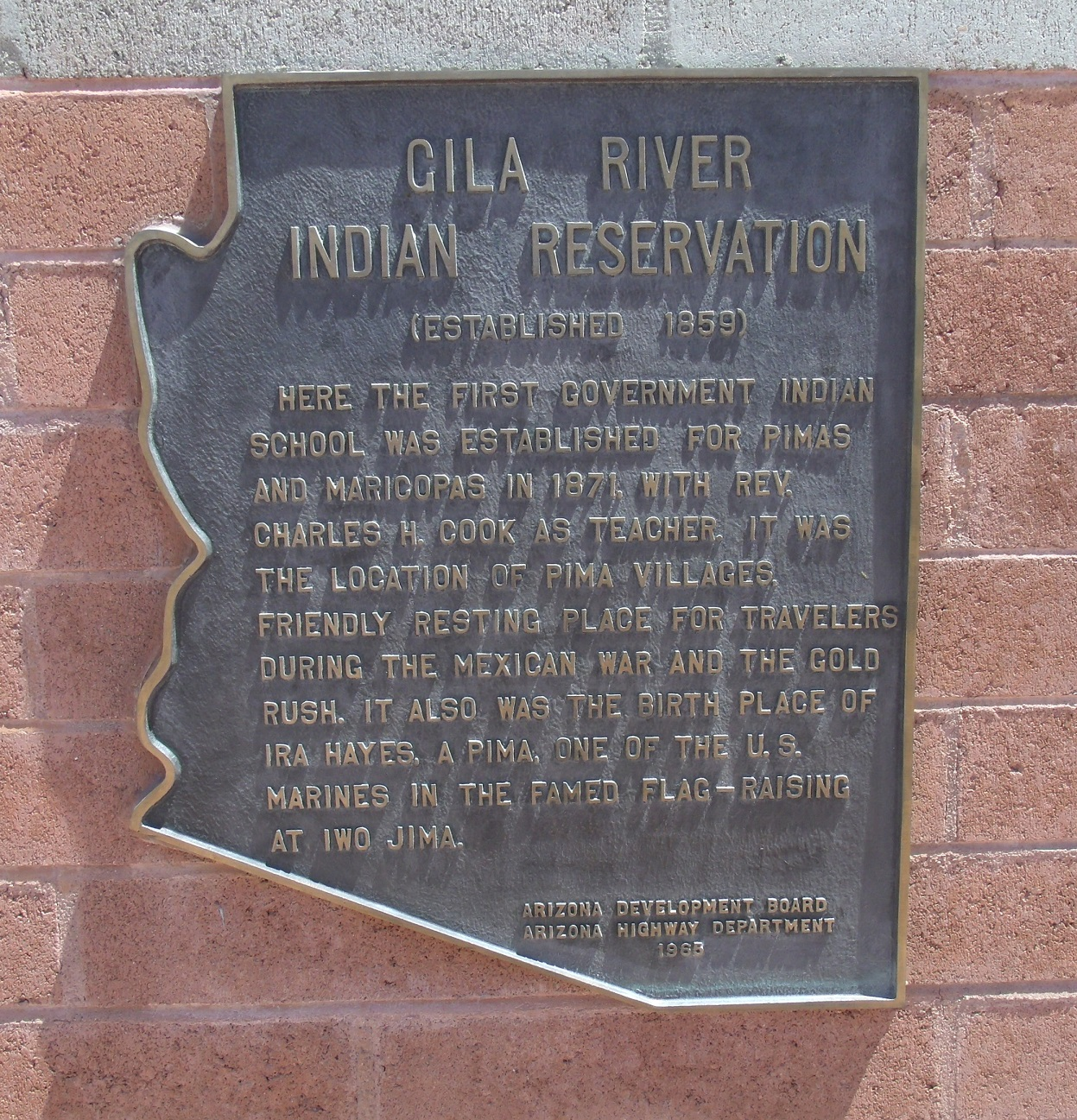
Historic Marker which reads: Gila River Indian Reservation (established 1859) Here the first Indian school was established by the government for the Pimas and Maricopas in 1871, with Rev. Charles H. Cook as teacher. It was the location of Pima villages, friendly resting places for travelers during the Mexican War and the Gold Rush. It was also the birthplace of Ira Hayes, a Pima, one of the U.S. Marines in the famed flag raising at Iwo Jima.

Gila River Indian Reservation was a reservation established in 1859 by the United States government in New Mexico Territory, to set aside the lands of the Akimel O’odham (Pima) and the Piipaash (Maricopa) people along the Gila River, in what is now Pinal County, Arizona. The self-government of the reservation as the Gila River Indian Community was established by Congress in 1939.

== History ==
The Pima Villages and some of their lands were included in the Gila River Indian Reservation in 1859. An Indian Agency was established at Casa Blanca with Silas St. John, (station agent of the Butterfield Overland Mail at Casa Blanca Station), appointed on February 18, 1859, as Special Agent for the Pima and Maricopa Indians. Agent St. John also conducted a census of the villages later that year.
