= El Llano, Arizona =

19th century Pima Village, on the Gila River, Pinal County, Arizona, US

El Llano, Spanish for "the plain or open space" or Buen Llano, "good plain", one of the 19th century Pima Villages, was located along the south side of the Gila River, between Sweetwater and Sacaton, in what is now the Gila River Indian Community in Pinal County, Arizona.
