= Hueso Parado =

Former village in Pinal County, Arizona

Hueso Parado (Spanish for "Standing Bone") or El Juez Tarado ("The Judge Tarado") (1858 census), was the largest village of the Maricopa people in the 19th century, in what is now the Gila River Indian Community in Pinal County, Arizona.

El Hueso Parado de Pimas y Cocomaricopas, was first mentioned in an 1823 Mexican Army report, as being located 7 leagues (17.5 miles) down the Gila River from the Pima Villages. As its name implies it was home to both Pima and Maricopa. Hueso Parado village lay on the west and downstream of the other Pima villages and upstream of the other Maricopa villages. It lay north of Maricopa Wells, above the confluence of the Santa Cruz River with the Gila, on a neck of land between the two rivers. The 1859 survey of the village showed extensive irrigation canals on both the south bank of the Gila and the north bank of the Santa Cruz Rivers, with the village in between them.

The 1858 census showed Hueso Parado had a population 314 Maricopa and 263 Pima people also.

By 1870, water diverted for irrigation above the Pima Reservation by Mexican and American farmers had made the water too alkaline to drink or use for irrigation at Hueso Parado. The Maricopa abandoned it, moving to the Salt River Valley to take up farming there.
