= Cachanillo, Arizona =

19th-century Pima Village in Arizona, US

Cachanillo was one of the 19th century Pima Villages, located along the Gila River, in what is now the Gila River Indian Community in Pinal County, Arizona.

== Demographics ==
Historical population
| Census | Pop. | Note | %± |
|---|---|---|---|
| 1860 | 504 | | — |
U.S. Decennial Census

Cachanillo appeared once on the 1860 United States census in what was then Arizona County, New Mexico Territory. It reported a population of 504, all Pima people. It was the 4th largest native community recorded in Arizona County, and 5th overall in size. Because census takers in 1860 and the specials prior to that failed to denote the precise location of the specific Pima villages on maps, it is unclear their exact locations today.
