= Battle of Picacho Pass =

1862 Battle of the American Civil War

Coordinates: 32°37′52″N 111°24′56″W

- Part of the Trans-Mississippi Theater of the American Civil War
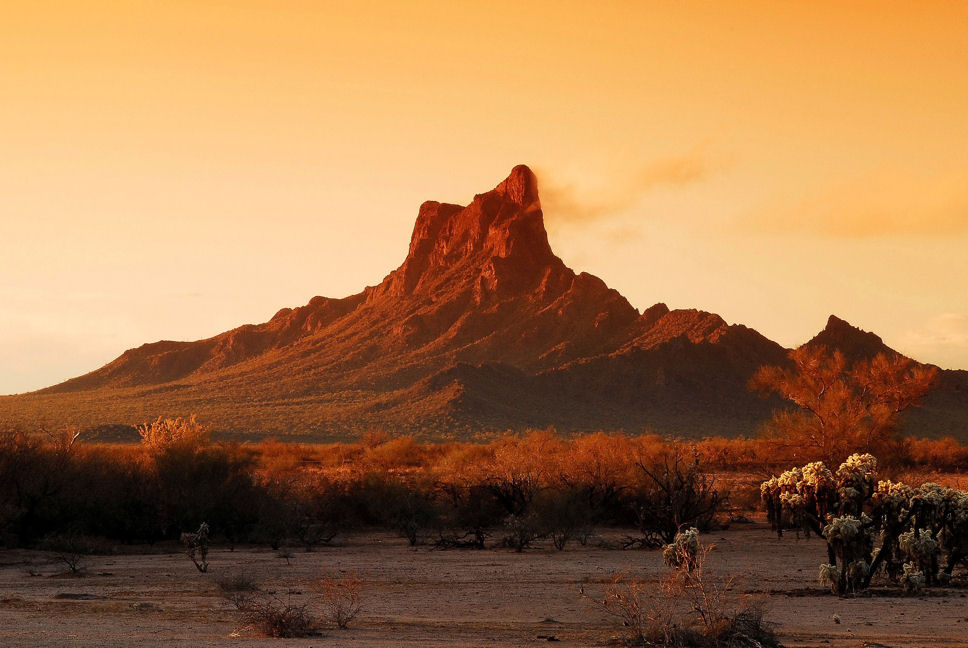
- Picacho Peak
Date	April 15, 1862
Location	Picacho Peak, New Mexico Territory (USA), Arizona Territory (CSA); Modern Day: Picacho Peak, Pinal County, Arizona
Result	Confederate victory; Union cavalry retreat; Confederates driven back into Texas by May

Belligerents
United States	(Confederate States of America) Confederate States

Commanders and leaders
(United States) James H. Carleton (United States) James Barrett †	(Confederate States of America) Henry Holmes (POW)

Strength
13 cavalry	10 cavalry

Casualties and losses
3 killed, 3 wounded	1 killed, 4 wounded, 3 captured

The Battle at Picacho, also known as the Battle of Picacho Peak, was an engagement of the American Civil War on April 15, 1862. The action occurred around Picacho Peak, 50 miles (80 km) northwest of Tucson, Arizona. It was fought between a Union cavalry patrol from California and a party of Confederate pickets from Tucson, and marks the westernmost battle of the American Civil War involving fatalities (though a skirmish known as the Battle of Stanwix Station was 40 miles further west and 80 miles from the California border in the direction of Fort Yuma).

== Background ==
After a Confederate force of about 120 cavalrymen arrived at Tucson from Texas on February 28, 1862, they proclaimed Tucson the capital of the western district of the Confederate Arizona Territory, which comprised what is now southern Arizona and southern New Mexico. Mesilla, near Las Cruces, was declared the territorial capital and seat of the eastern district of the territory. The property of Tucson Unionists was confiscated, and they were jailed or driven out of town. Confederates hoped a flood of sympathizers in southern California would join them and give the Confederacy an outlet on the Pacific Ocean, but this never happened. California Unionists were eager to prevent this, and 2,000 Union volunteers from California, known as the California Column and led by Colonel James Henry Carleton, moved east to Fort Yuma, California, and by May 1862 had driven the small Confederate force back into Texas.

Like most of the Civil War era engagements in Arizona (Dragoon Springs, Stanwix Station and Apache Pass) Picacho Pass occurred near relay stations along the former Butterfield Overland Stagecoach route, which opened in 1859 and ceased operations when the war began. This skirmish occurred about a mile northwest of Picacho Pass Station.

== Battle ==
Twelve Union cavalry troopers and one scout (reported to be mountain man Pauline Weaver but in reality Arizona City (Now Yuma, AZ) resident John W. Jones), commanded by Lieutenant James Barrett of the 1st California Cavalry, were conducting a sweep of the Picacho Peak area, looking for Confederates reported to be nearby. The Arizona Confederates were commanded by Sergeant Henry Holmes. Barrett was under orders not to engage them, but to wait for the main column to come up. However, "Lt. Barrett acting alone rather than in concert, surprised the Rebels and should have captured them without firing a shot, if the thing had been conducted properly." Instead, in the midafternoon the lieutenant "led his men into the thicket single file without dismounting them. The first fire from the enemy emptied four saddles, when the enemy retired farther into the dense thicket and had time to reload. ... Barrett followed them, calling on his men to follow him." Three of the Confederates surrendered. Barrett secured one of the prisoners and had just remounted his horse when a bullet struck him in the neck, killing him. Fierce and confused fighting continued among the mesquite and arroyos for 90 minutes, with two more Union fatalities and three troopers wounded. Exhausted and leaderless, the Californians broke off the fight and the Arizona Rangers, minus three who surrendered, mounted and carried warning of the approaching Union army to Tucson. Barrett's disobedience of orders had cost him his life and lost any chance of a Union surprise attack on Tucson.

The Union troops retreated to the Pima Indian Villages and hastily built a fort named in Barrett's honor at White's Mill, waiting to gather resources to continue the advance. However, with no Confederate reinforcements available, Captain Sherod Hunter and his men withdrew as soon as the column again advanced. The Union troops entered Tucson without any opposition.

The bodies of the two Union enlisted men killed at Picacho (George Johnson and William S Leonard) were later removed to the National Cemetery at the Presidio of San Francisco in San Francisco, California. However, Lieutenant Barrett's grave, reportedly buried near the present railroad tracks, remains undisturbed and unmarked as the site was lost. Union reports claimed that two Confederates were wounded in the fight, but Captain Hunter in his official report listed no Confederate casualties other than the three men captured. One of the rebels named John Hill was recognized by a Private Frank Clark, as they were both from Napa.

== Aftermath ==
Before this engagement a Confederate cavalry patrol had advanced as far west as Stanwix Station, where it was burning the hay stored there when it was attacked by a patrol from the California Column. The Confederates had been burning hay stored at the stage stations in order to delay the Union advance from California. About the same time as the skirmish at Picacho Peak, a larger force of Confederates was thwarted in its attempt to advance northward from Santa Fe, New Mexico, in the Battle of Glorieta Pass. By July the Confederates had retreated to Texas, though pro-Confederate militia units operated in some areas until mid-1863. The following year, the Union organized its own territory of Arizona, dividing New Mexico along the state's current north–south border, extending control southward from the provisional capital of Prescott. Although the encounter at Picacho Pass was a minor engagement in the Civil War, it could be considered the high-water mark of the Confederate West.

== Re-enactment ==
Every March, Picacho Peak State Park hosts a re-enactment of the Civil War battles of Arizona and New Mexico, including the battle of Picacho Pass. The re-enactments now have grown so large that many more participants tend to be involved than took part in the actual engagements and include infantry units and artillery as well as cavalry. The 2015 re-enactment, which was held March 22 and 23, also included re-enactments of the Battle of Valverde and the Battle of Glorieta Pass, both of which took place in relatively nearby New Mexico. The skirmish site and the remains of the Butterfield station are listed on the National Register of Historic Places.

== Gallery ==
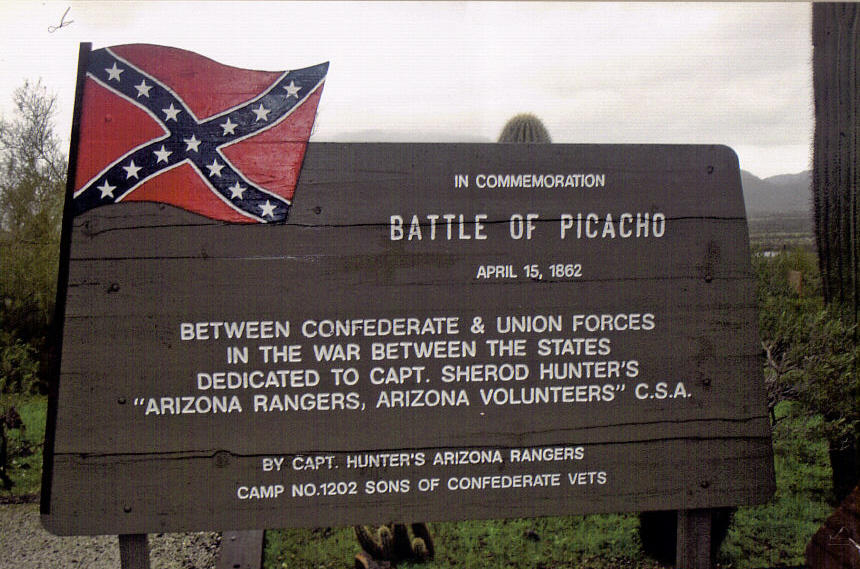
Battle of Picacho Marker.

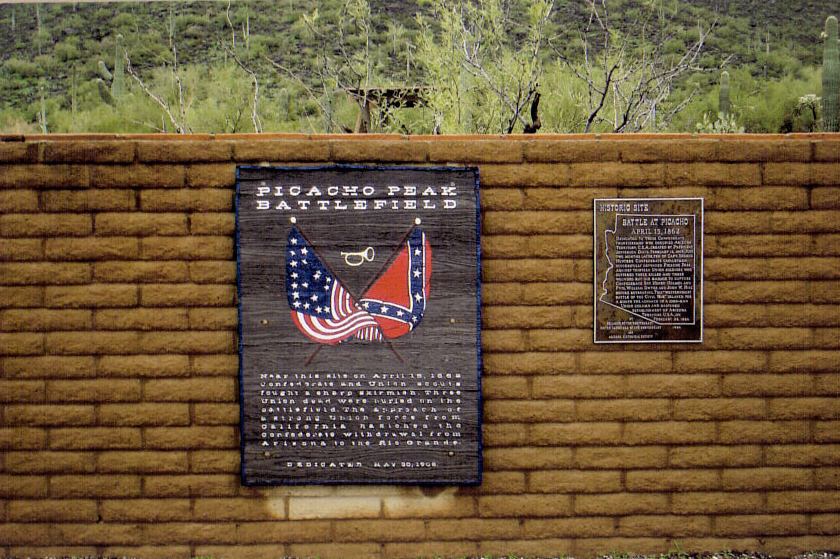
Picacho Battlefield Marker.

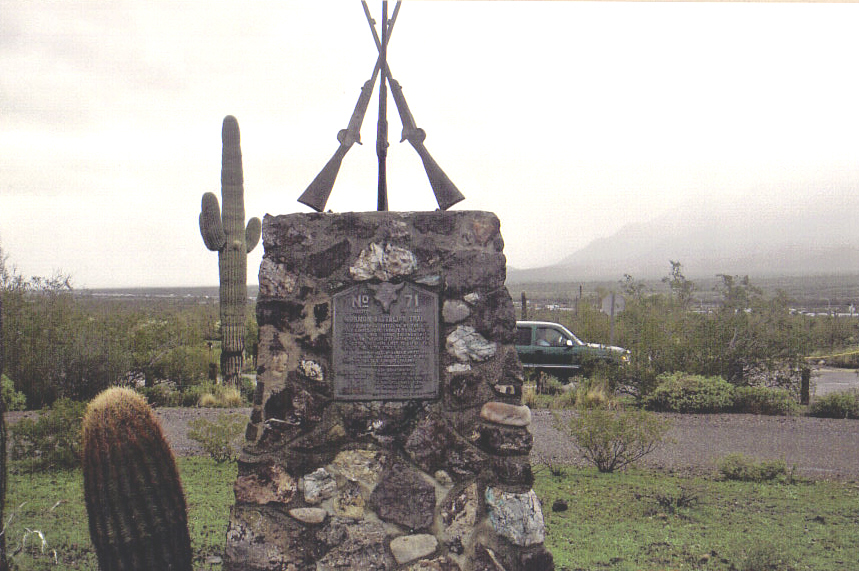
Battle of Picacho Monument.

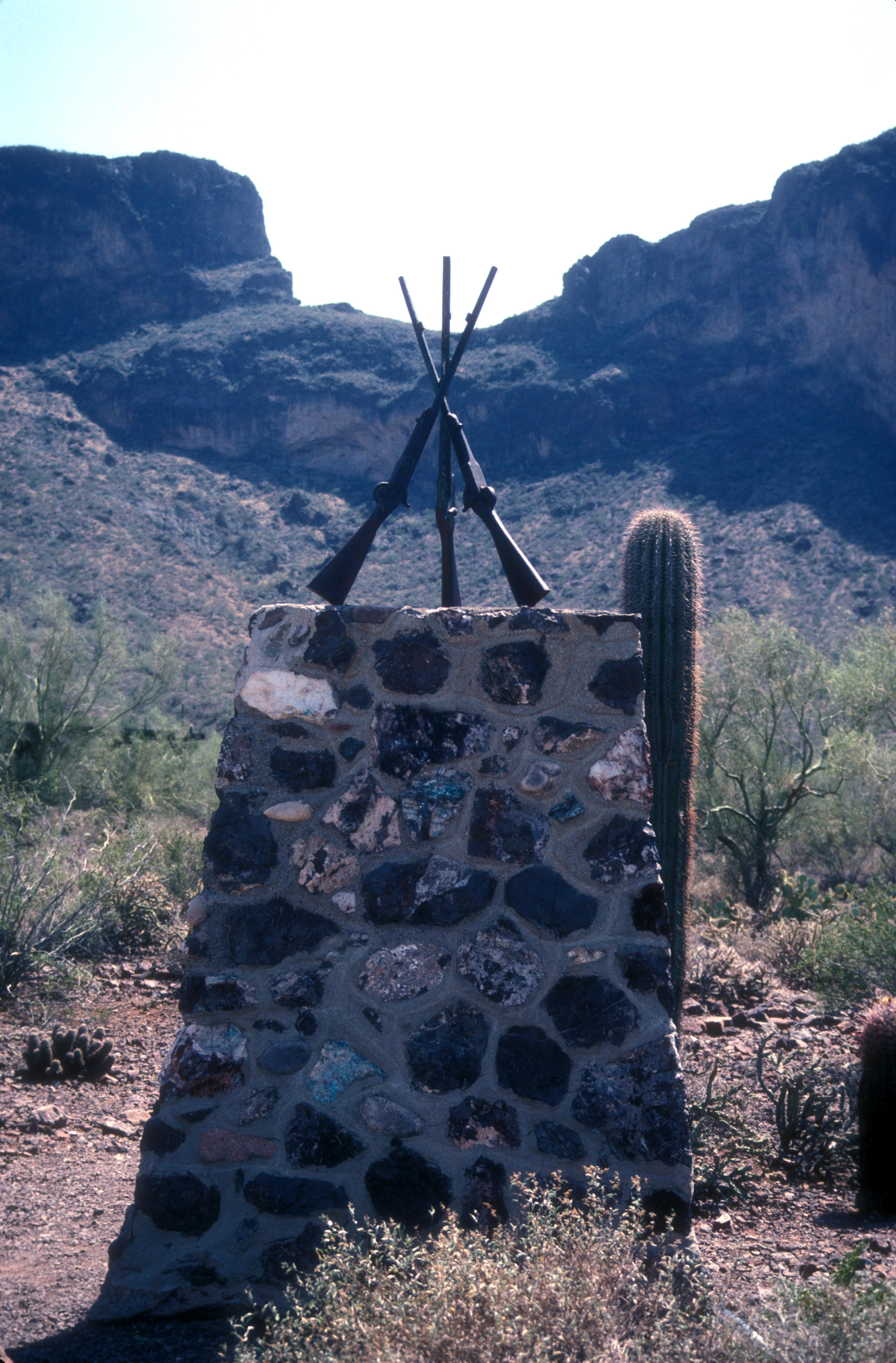
Side view of the monument.

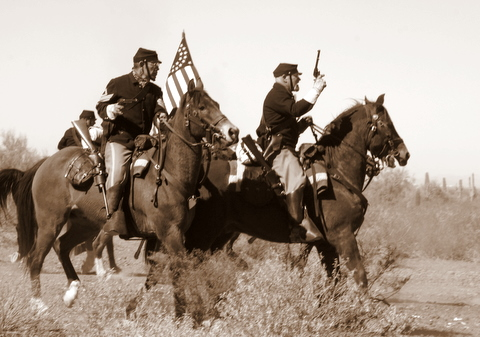
2007 re-enactment of the Picacho Pass battle.

== See also ==
- Apache Wars
- New Mexico Campaign
- St. Albans Raid
