= Hormiguerito, Arizona =

19th century Pima Village on the Gila River in Pinal County, Arizona

Hormiguerito, or Ormejera No. 2 in an 1858 census, (probably a garbled American version of Hormiguero), one of the smaller 19th century Pima Villages, located along the Gila River, in what is now the Gila River Indian Community in Pinal County, Arizona. Hormiguero, Spanish for "ant hill", with the diminutive "-ito", meant Little Anthill. It was among the smallest of the Pima settlements along the Gila.
