= Maricopa Slim =

American gunslinger

Maricopa Slim (October 13, 1883 – November 5, 1914) was a gunslinger and railroad bull of the American Old West. His real name was John Powers and he worked in the Gila River Valley of Arizona, United States in the early 20th century, originally as a Southern Pacific railroad detective and later as a deputy sheriff.

== Biography ==
Maricopa Slim was born John C. Powers in Texas on October 3, 1883. Maricopa Slim seems to have spent much or most of his time rousting hobos who were trying to ride the rails cross-country for free. Captured vagrants were kept in a jail made of railroad ties until they could be transported to the county jail in Florence, Arizona. Maricopa Slim was based out of the Maricopa Junction station; he sometimes worked with deputy sheriff Perry, known as the Gila Monster of Gila Bend station.

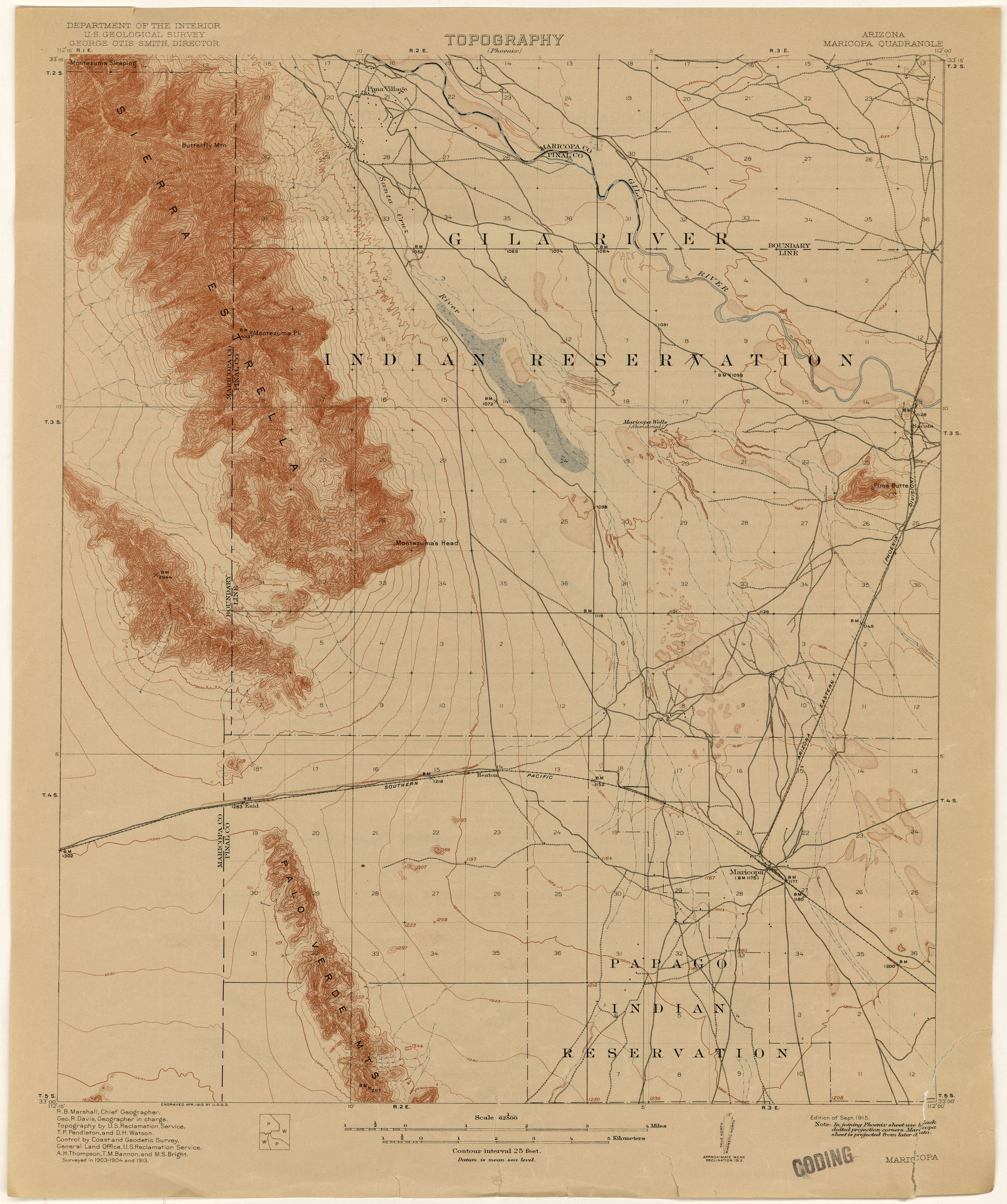
Maricopa railway junction and environs, surveyed 1913

Maricopa Slim was involved in several shootouts:

- Killed "the famous Jack Miller"
- Killed one Mexican and wounded two in a gunfight at Sacate, Arizona; the Mexicans were wanted for beating up the shopkeeper of Sacaton Siding and robbing his store. The Mexicans were also wanted for the killing of another deputy sheriff; the manhunt left seven dead.
- January 1913: Two escaped prisoners, J. C. Miller (shot and killed) and J. C. Wilson (recaptured)
- November 1914: Maricopa Slim versus an employee of either the Barnum or the Al G. Barnes Circus; the employee was named Sideshow Black or Mike Meehan or Frank Sawyer; "Maricopa Slim" Powers was killed immediately, the other man later died of his wounds. The exact circumstances of Maricopa Slim's death have been obscure since 1914.

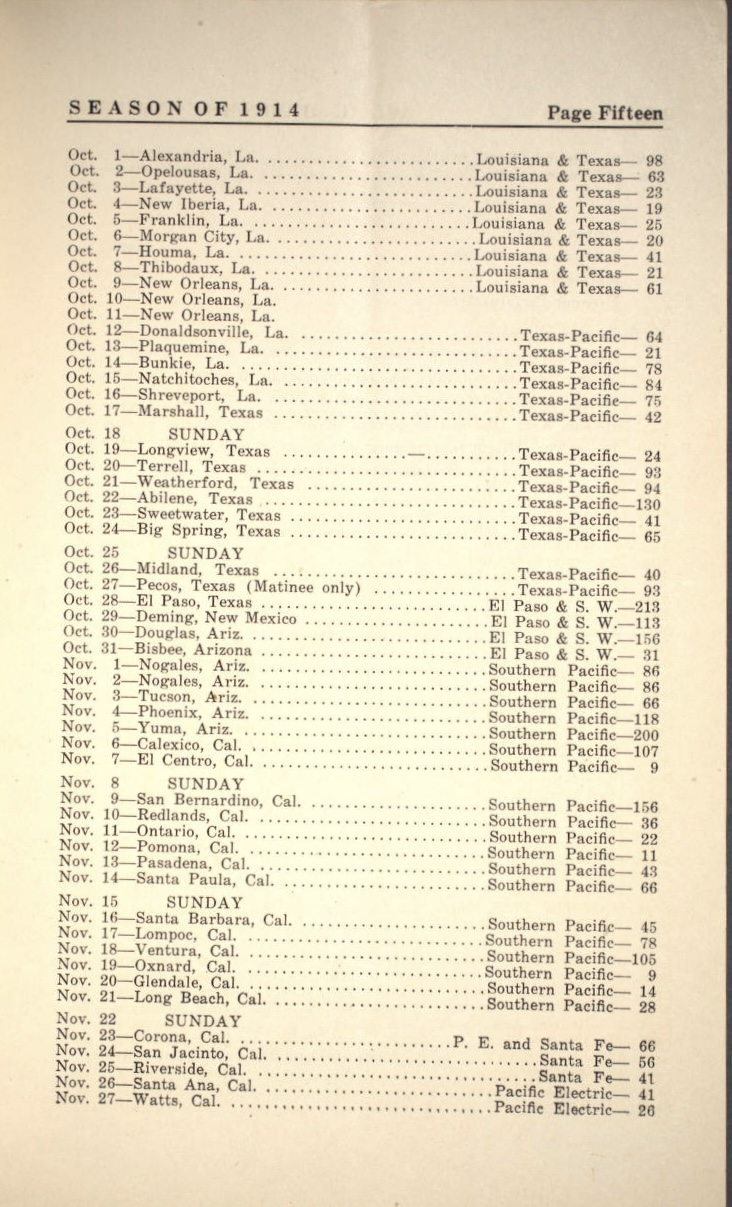
Al G. Barnes Circus was at the Yuma station on November 5 (1914 route book, Milner Library, ISU)

When Tom and John Powers and another man Tom J. Sisson were accused in 1918 of "killing three Arizona peace officers in the Aravaipa canyon north of Tucson," initial reports had it that the Powers brothers were half-brothers of Maricopa Slim, but this was false.

In 1961 a retired Southern Pacific railroad bull told an Idaho columnist that Maricopa Slim was "the most abusive, just unnecessarily darn mean man you could think of" and he was killed by someone he had bullied.

Maricopa Slim, the Gila Monster and Yermo Red are mentioned in a 2018 Beau L'Amour novel.

== See also ==
- Gila monster (Heloderma suspectum)
