= California Column =

Force of Union volunteers in the American Civil War

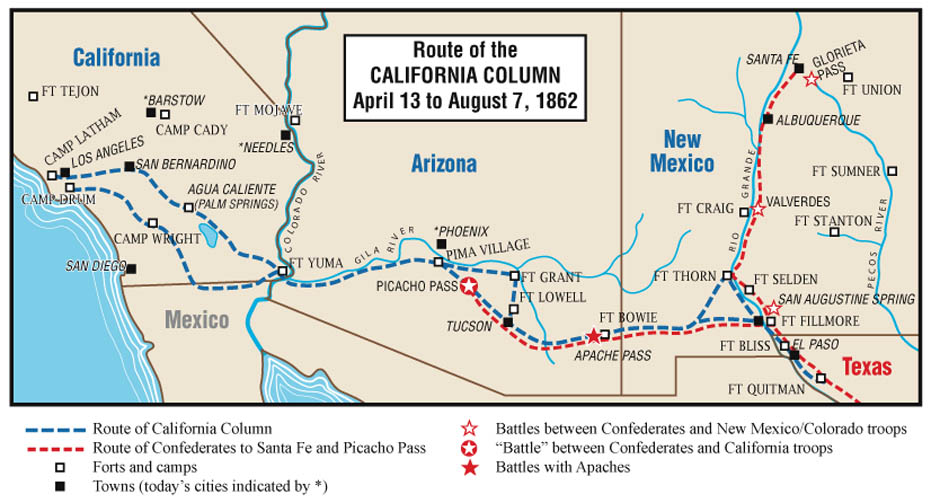
Route of the Column

The California Column was a force of Union volunteers sent to Arizona and New Mexico during the American Civil War. The command marched over 900 miles (1,400 km) from California through Arizona and New Mexico Territory to the Rio Grande and as far east as El Paso, Texas, between April and August 1862.

== Formation ==
"The 'California Column' originally consisted of ten companies of the 1st California Infantry, all five companies of the 1st Regiment California Volunteer Cavalry, Company B, 2nd Regiment California Volunteer Cavalry and Light Battery A of the Third U.S. Artillery. The command contained 1500 well-drilled and disciplined men. Later on, Lieutenant Colonel George W. Bowie's 5th California Infantry was added, which brought the total strength of the column to 2350 men."

== Expedition ==
The objective of California Column commander Colonel James Henry Carleton (promoted to brigadier general while the column was en route) was to drive Confederate troops out of the Federal New Mexico Territory. In 1861, a relatively small Confederate Army force from Texas pushed out small Union forces from several forts in the Territory. The Confederates also enlisted citizens of their Confederate Territory of Arizona in small units.

The soldiers of the California Column, both infantry and cavalry, often traveled by foot wearing woolen uniforms in the desert heat. They started out from Fort Yuma along the Colorado River. Much like the Confederate Army of New Mexico (also known as the Sibley Brigade), which had entered New Mexico from Texas in December 1861, they traveled in small groups at intervals of a few days so men and horses would not exhaust the springs and wells along the way. They followed the established route of the Butterfield Overland Mail, which had ceased operation the year before. The mail posts were filled with food and grain which Union forces had stockpiled there before the hostilities.

== Arizona battles ==
Arizona Confederate volunteers, of the Company A, Arizona Rangers, under Captain Sherod Hunter, arrested the Union Army agent, Ammi White, destroyed White's flour mill at Casa Blanca and supplies of food and fodder being gathered there and at other stage stations along the Column's route between Fort Yuma and Tucson, which slowed Carleton's progress. Most of Carleton's attempts to send messages to General E. R. S. Canby, the Union's departmental commander of New Mexico, were intercepted, and one patrol sent to meet White was captured by Confederates at White's Mill at the Pima Indian villages.

During their advance the California Column engaged the Confederates in two small skirmishes. The first was a skirmish with Confederates attempting to burn forage gathered at Stanwix Station near the end of March 1862. The second clash came in mid-April when the column marched on Tucson from Casa Blanca, at the Picacho Pass. Their subsequent rapid approach to Tucson nearly trapped the Confederate rearguard.

It was not until late June that a scout named John W. Jones was able to outrun pursuing Apaches and get a message to Canby: "The Column from California is really coming." On the march to the Rio Grande, 140 men of Company E, 1st California Infantry, and Company B, 2nd California Cavalry, fought the famous Apache leaders Cochise and Mangas Coloradas at Apache Pass in July.

== California Column in New Mexico Territory ==
When elements of the California Column reached the Rio Grande, their crossing was delayed a week by the huge spring flood that year, part of the Great Flood of 1862. Upon crossing it, they found the Confederates had already retreated into Texas. Carlton followed them into West Texas, capturing the town of Franklin (modern-day El Paso) and advancing as far as Fort Quitman.

Part of their service after occupying West Texas would be as garrisons to prevent the return of the Confederates into the Union reorganized Territories of New Mexico and Arizona. Their main activity was as garrisons of the settlements and forts in New Mexico Territory, and in fighting against the Apaches and Navajo until they were relieved by the U. S. Army in 1866.
