= Sierra Estrella =

Landform in Maricopa County, Arizona

Estrella Mountains
- Sierra Estrella
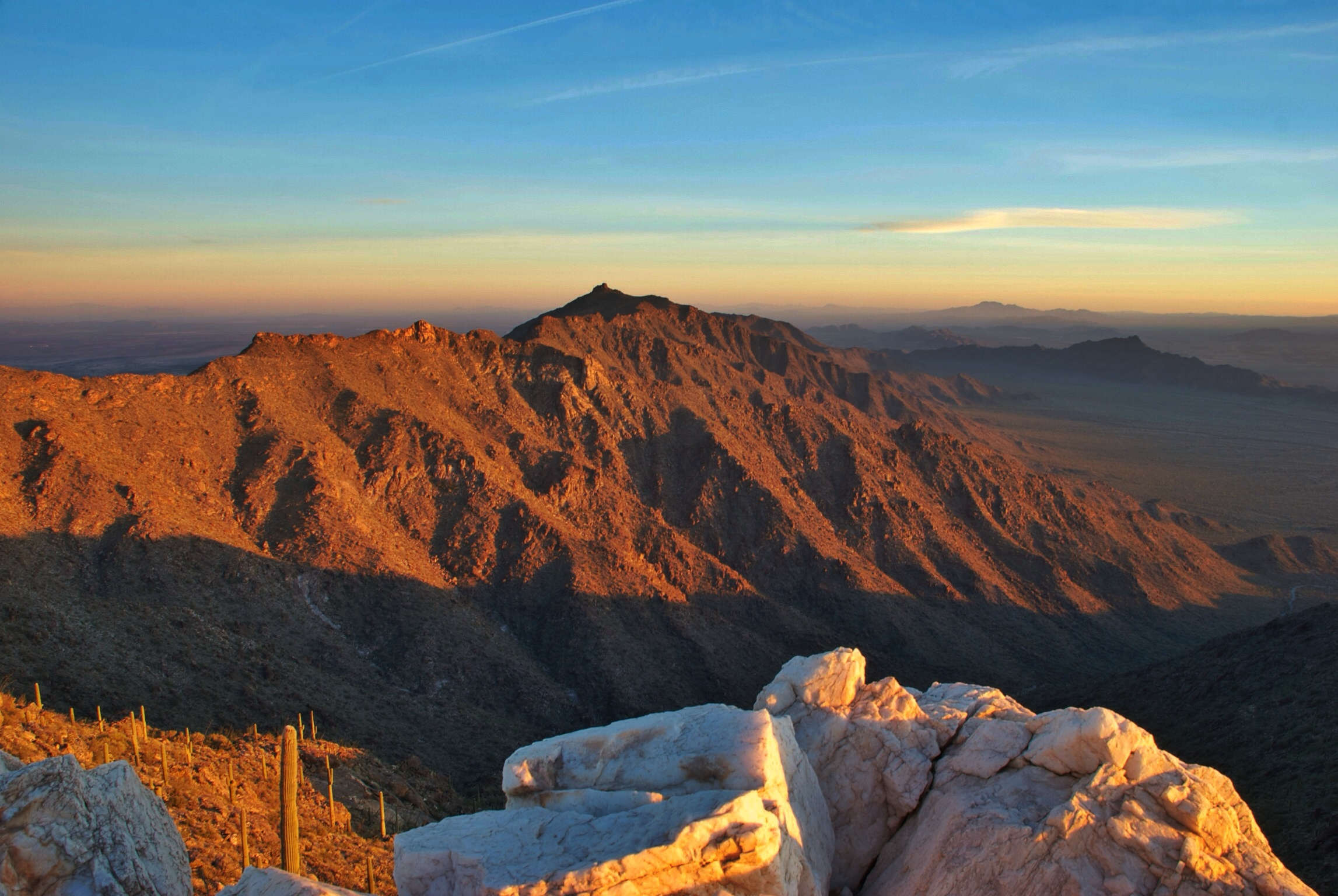
- Quartz Peak in 2014

Highest point
- Peak: Hayes Peak
- Elevation: 4,512 ft (1,375 m)
- Listing: Mountain ranges of Arizona
- Coordinates: 33°16′25″N 112°16′51″W

Dimensions
- Length: 20 mi (32 km) NW-SE
- Width: 5 mi (8.0 km)

Naming
- Etymology: Estrella Mountains, Spanish for Montañas Estrella
- Native name: Komaḍk (O'odham)

Geography
- Location within Arizona
- Country: United States
- State: Arizona
- Regions: (northern)-Sonoran Desert; (Gila River Valley)
- County: Maricopa
- Settlements: Komatke; Laveen

The Estrella Mountains or The Sierra Estrella (O'odham: Komaḍk, Maricopa: Vii Lyxa, Yavapai: Wi:kchasa) is a mountain range located southwest of Phoenix, Arizona. Much of the range falls within the Gila River Indian Reservation, but 14,400 acres (5,800 ha) of BLM land is protected as the Sierra Estrella Wilderness, and is also located near Goodyear, Arizona to the northwest.

== Description ==
On the highest peaks, temperatures are usually 8–12 °F (4.4–6.7 °C) cooler than in the valley. Snow can be seen at least once or twice a year on the highest points of the mountain range (typically above 4,000 ft). Sometimes, the snow level can drop near 2,000 ft (610 m), but depends if the precipitation reaches the mountain range. A good example is during the month of March 2006, when a heavy storm system reached the state and lowered snow levels near 4,000 ft (1,200 m). Once the skies cleared next morning, snow covered the Estrella's mountain tops.

Estrella Mountain Regional park occupies 19,840 acres (8,030 ha) in the northern portion of the range. The park offers multi-use trails including a competitive loop for running and mountain biking. Equestrian use is permitted. The park has parking and a riding arena.

== History ==
The Sierra Estrellas were inhabited by the Akimel O'odham people and also some Yavapai bands at the north end of the range at the time of Spanish colonization, and today the mountains tower over several of the Akimel O'odham and Maricopa villages of the Gila River Indian Community. There are petroglyphs throughout the Southern portion of the range. In the colonial era, they were part of the land claimed as New Spain. Occasionally Spanish explorers or priests, most notably Father Kino, would venture near the range to document the area and contact the Akimel O'odham. On his return from the Colorado River in March 1699, Kino climbed a pass through the Sierra Estrellas and saw the Río Salado and Río Verde that he drew on his maps.

In 1810, Mexico declared independence from Spain, and the Sierra Estrellas went on to become part of Mexico. In 1827, a French fur trapping expedition led by Michel Robidoux was attacked by Indians and survivors escaped into the Sierra Estrella mountains. In 1853, the United States acquired the Estrellas from Mexico as part of the Gadsden purchase. It soon became part of a trade route for settlers in California known as the Butterfield Overland stage. People and equipment could be moved across the area much quicker. The route was massively successful in its time, moving millions of dollars in supplies. However, it was short-lived. Steam locomotives soon replaced stage coaches across the United States, and the Butterfield Stage Route was no longer utilized.

In 1857, the Battle of Pima Butte was fought in the area of the mountains. The allied Yuma, Mohave, Yavapai and Apache peoples attacked the Maricopa village of Secate. The Maricopa and their allies, the Akimel O'odham, defeated the attackers, leaving approximately 200 of them dead or wounded. It is notable for being the last major battle fought solely between indigenous Americans in North America.

== Access ==
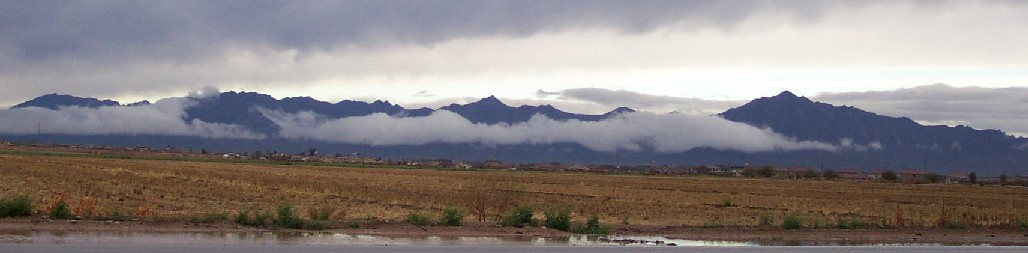
Estrella Mountains from Laveen, January 2004. Hayes Peak is on the right.

Four-wheel-drive vehicles are required to approach the wilderness boundary. Only the western boundary of the wilderness is accessible to the public; elsewhere the wilderness is bounded by the Gila River Indian Reservation.

== Peaks ==
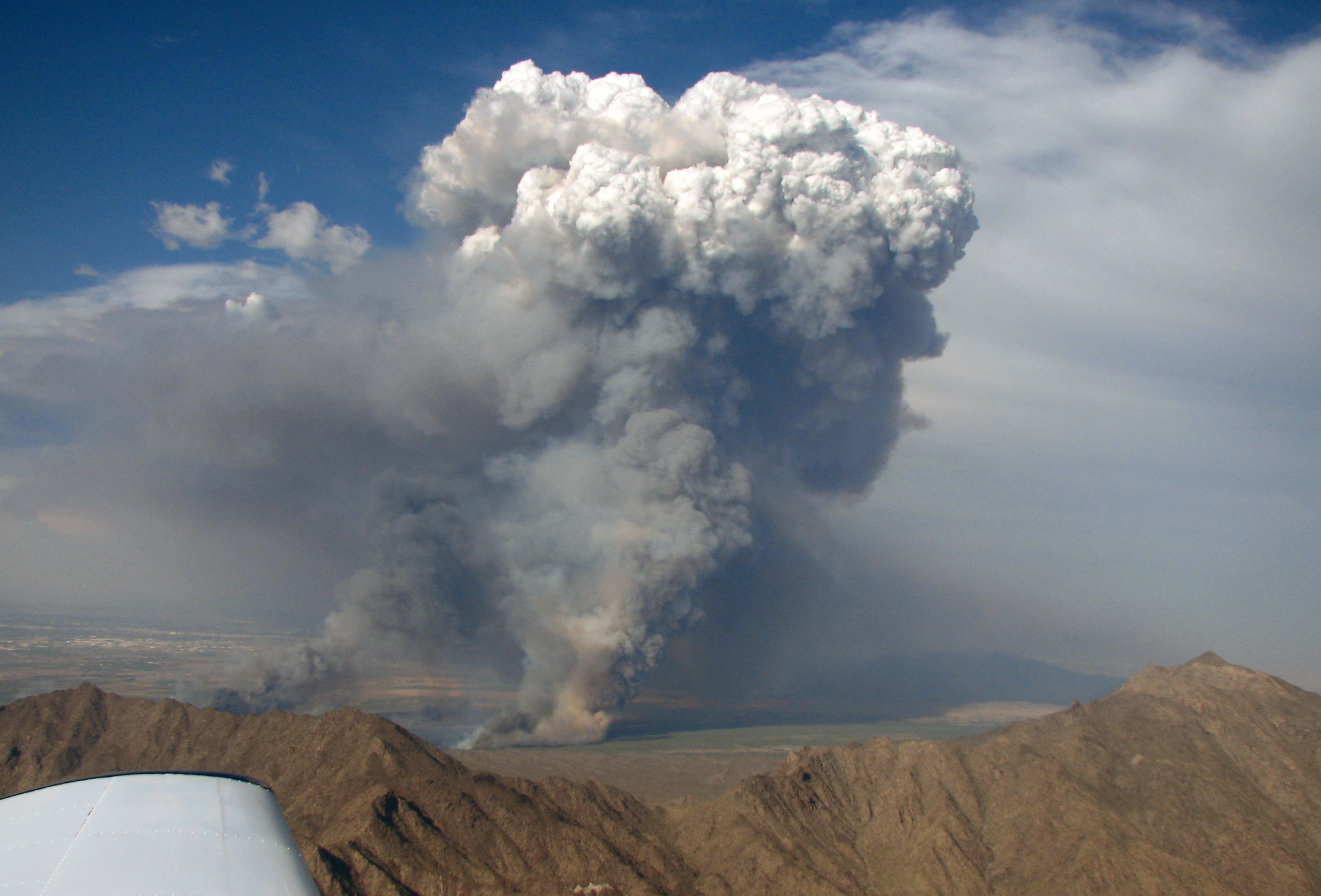
Fire in the Gila River Valley, southwest of Phoenix, (Rainbow Valley over peaks of Sierra Estrella)

The major peaks of the Sierra Estrella are (NW to SE):

- Hayes Peak, 4,512 feet (1,375 m), named in honor of Ira Hayes, US Marine hero of the Pima Nation
- Montezuma Sleeping
- Butterfly Mountain, 4,119 feet (1,255 m)
- Quartz Peak, 4,052 feet (1,235 m) (usually obscured by Butterfly Mountain when viewed from the east)
- Montezuma Peak, 4,337 feet (1,322 m)
- Montezuma Head

The names of the peaks can vary by map. For example, Google Maps lists Hayes Peak as Sierra Estrella High Point and does not name any other peak.

== See also ==
- List of Arizona Wilderness Areas
