= Hormiguero, Arizona =

19th century Pima Village, on the Gila River, Pinal County, Arizona

Hormiguero, Spanish for "anthill", (also called Ormejera No. 1 in an 1858 census, probably a garbled American version of Hormiguero), one of the 19th century Pima Villages, was located along the Gila River, in what is now the Gila River Indian Community in Pinal County, Arizona.

== History ==
This village was first called El Hormiguero, in an 1825 Mexican Army report which locates it 37 leagues from Tucson, 1 league downstream from Buen Llano, and 3/4 league upstream from La Tierra Amontonada, with a population of 1,200 Pima people. It appears in the first American Indian Agency census made of the Pima Villages in 1858, as Ormejera No. 1, with a population of 643. It was called Hormiguero in the 1859 census, population of 566 and the official 1860 Census, population 510.
