= Sweetwater, Pinal County, Arizona =

Populated place in Pinal County, Arizona, US

Coordinates: 33°07′55″N 111°50′26″W

Sweetwater, is a populated place located along the south side of the Gila River, between Sacaton and Casa Blanca, in what is now the Gila River Indian Community in Pinal County, Arizona, United States at an elevation of 1,211 feet (369 m). Not to be confused with a populated place of the same name on the Navajo Nation within Apache County, Arizona.

== History ==
Sweetwater, was the location of a stage station and the Pima Agency for Arizona Territory in 1879.
