= Sacaton (village) =

Former Maricopa Indian village in Arizona

Sacaton, Arizona
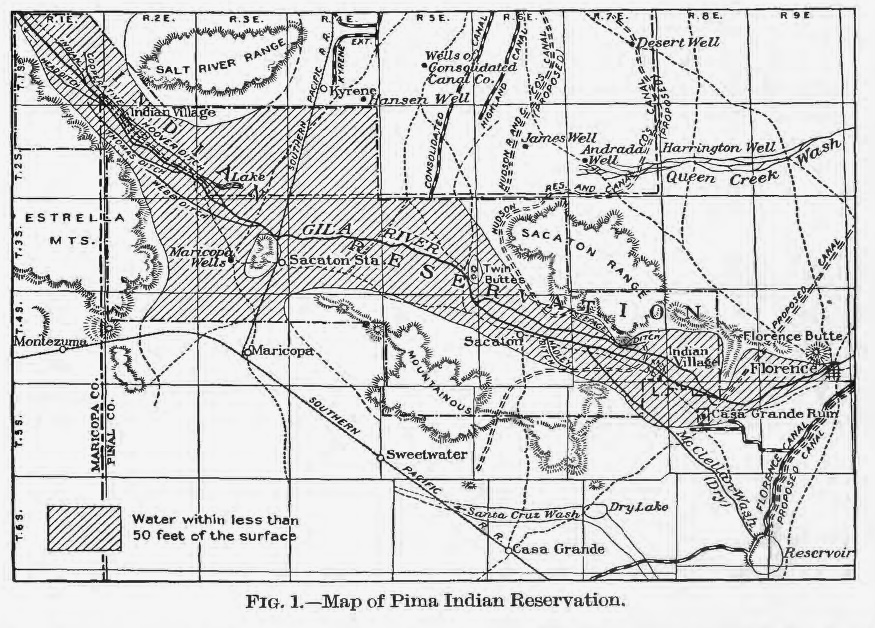
- 1904 map of Pima Indian Reservation showing groundwater and geographic landmarks

- Location in Arizona Location in United States Location in North America
- Coordinates: 33°4′N 111°44′W

Sacaton or Socatoon was a village of the Maricopa people, established above the Pima Villages, (now the Gila River Indian Community) after the June 1, 1857, in the Battle of Pima Butte where it appears a few months later in the 1857 Chapman Census. Sacaton village lay on the Gila River, 3.75 miles west of modern Sacaton.

The 1858–1861 Socatoon Station of the Butterfield Overland Mail located four miles east of the village took its name from this village.

== See also ==
- Sacate, Arizona, current name of location
- Pima villages
