= Arenal, Arizona =

19th century Pima Village, on the Gila River, in Pinal County, Arizona

Arenal, "sandy place" in Spanish, also known as Aranca No.1 in the 1857 census, was one of the 19th century Pima Villages, located along the Gila River, in what is now the Gila River Indian Community in Pinal County, Arizona.

== Demographics ==
Historical population
Census	Pop.	Note	%±
1860	577		—
U.S. Decennial Census

Arenal appeared once on the 1860 U.S. Census in what was then Arizona County, New Mexico Territory. It reported a population of 577, all Pima Indians. It was the largest native community recorded in Arizona County, behind only Tucson. Because census takers in 1860 and the specials prior to that failed to denote the precise location of the specific Pima villages on maps, it is unclear their exact locations today. It was, however, noted that it was apparently between the villages of Cerrito & Cachanillo. Arenal was never returned again on the census after 1860.
