= Maricopa Wells, Arizona =

- Locale
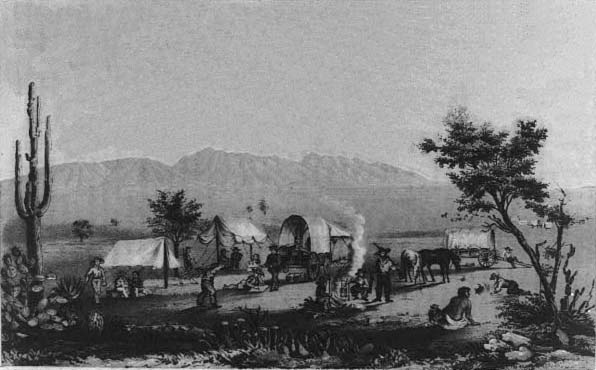
- An American wagon train at Maricopa Wells, 1857 drawing

- Location within the state of Arizona Maricopa Wells (the United States)
- Coordinates: 33°09′43″N 112°05′03″W
- Country: United States
- State: Arizona
- County: Pinal
- Elevation: 1,093 ft (333 m)
- Time zone: UTC-7 (Mountain (MST))
  - Summer (DST): UTC-7 (MST)
- Area code: 520
- FIPS code: 04-44585
- GNIS feature ID: 42802

Maricopa Wells is a former place (locale) situated in Pinal County, Arizona. It has an estimated elevation of 1,093 feet (333 m) above sea level. Historically, it was an oasis around a series of watering holes in the Sierra Estrella, eight miles north of present-day Maricopa, Arizona, and about a mile west of Pima Butte. It developed as a trading center and stopping place for travelers in the mid to late 19th century.

== History ==
Maricopa Wells was a watering place named by travelers on the Southern Emigrant Trail who used it as a stopping place on the trail. They could rest and feed and water their animals. They traded with the nearby Maricopa and Pima natives for crops produced in their fields, which they irrigated by the Gila River. A settlement developed here when it was the base for the large stage station for the San Antonio-San Diego Mail Line and Butterfield Overland Mail, and later stage companies. At one time this was the primary military telegraph post for all of Arizona Territory. Following the American Civil War a traveller's guide to the American West published in 1866 reported that it was 411 miles from San Diego Barracks to Oatman Flat via the roads of the day.

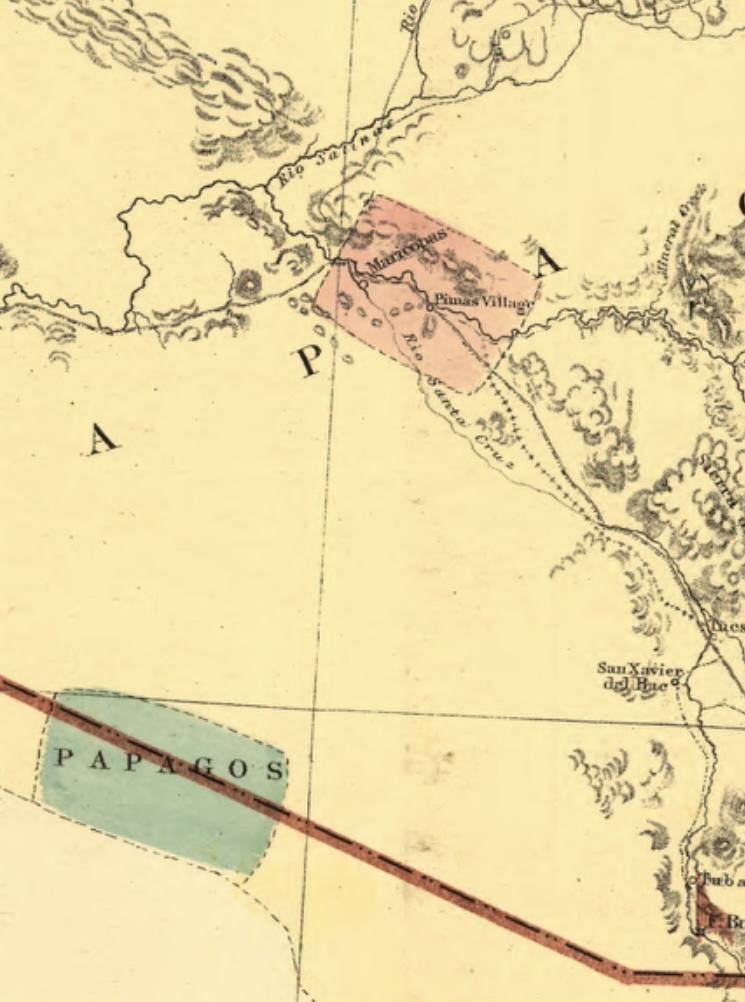
Maricopa and Pimas Villages, Military District of New Mexico, mapped 1858

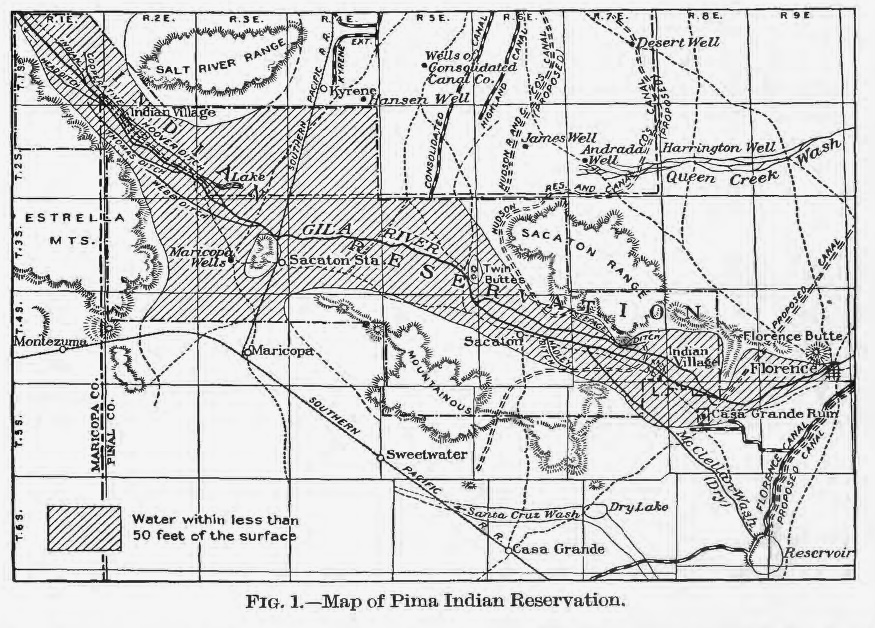
1904 map of Pima Indian Reservation showing location of Maricopa Wells versus (new) Maricopa

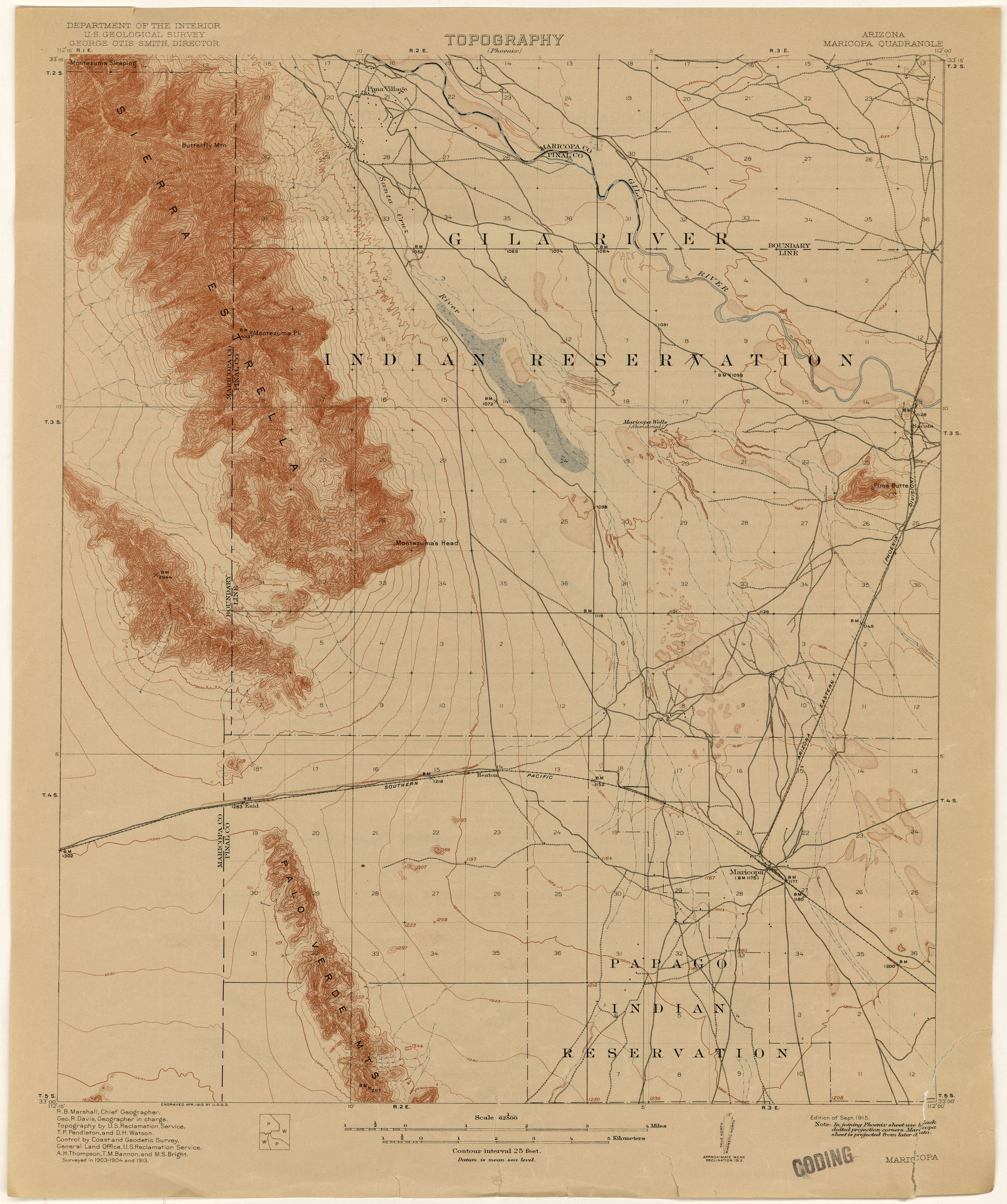
Maricopa Wells is in the center of the map, noted as "abandoned" in this 1913 topographic map produced by the U.S. Geological Survey

Maricopa Wells was abandoned after the Maricopa and Phoenix Railroad constructed a route north through Tempe to Phoenix. Maricopaville was planned as a terminus before Tempe won a spot on the line that was constructed. The settlement moved east to what developed as Maricopa Junction, known as Maricopa.

== See also ==
- Battle of Pima Butte
- Sacate, Arizona
