= Casa Grande station =

Former historic building in Pinal County, Arizona

- Southern Pacific Railroad Depot
- Formerly listed on the U.S. National Register of Historic Places
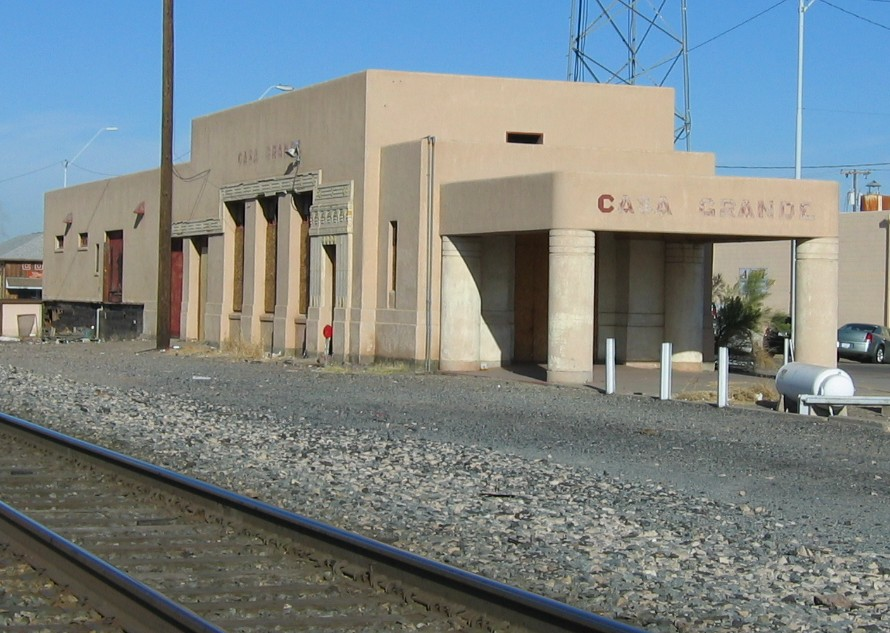

- Location within Arizona Location within the United States
- Location: Church St., Sacaton, Arizona
- Coordinates: 32.876111°N 111.755278°W
- NRHP reference No.: 02000734

Significant dates
- Added to NRHP: November 20, 2002
- Removed from NRHP: January 31, 2019

The Southern Pacific Railroad Depot is located at 201 W. Main Street in Casa Grande, Arizona. It was designated on the National Register of Historic Places, but removed from the listing on January 31, 2019, after being destroyed by a fire on June 5, 2009

== See also ==
- National Register of Historic Places listings in Pinal County, Arizona

Preceding station	Southern Pacific Railroad	Following station
Maricopa toward Los Angeles	Sunset Route	Picacho toward New Orleans
