= Pima Butte =

Landform in Pinal County, Arizona

Coordinates: 33°08′48″N 112°01′22″W

Pima Butte (Maricopa: Vii Vav) is a mountain summit in Pinal County, Arizona eight miles north of present-day Maricopa, Arizona. Pima Butte rises to 1,660 feet (510 meters) above sea level. As a significant landmark in the Gila Valley it was near the site of the 1857 Battle of Pima Butte, to which it gave its name.
