= Akimel Oʼodham =

Indigenous people in the US and Mexico

Akimel Oʼodham Pima
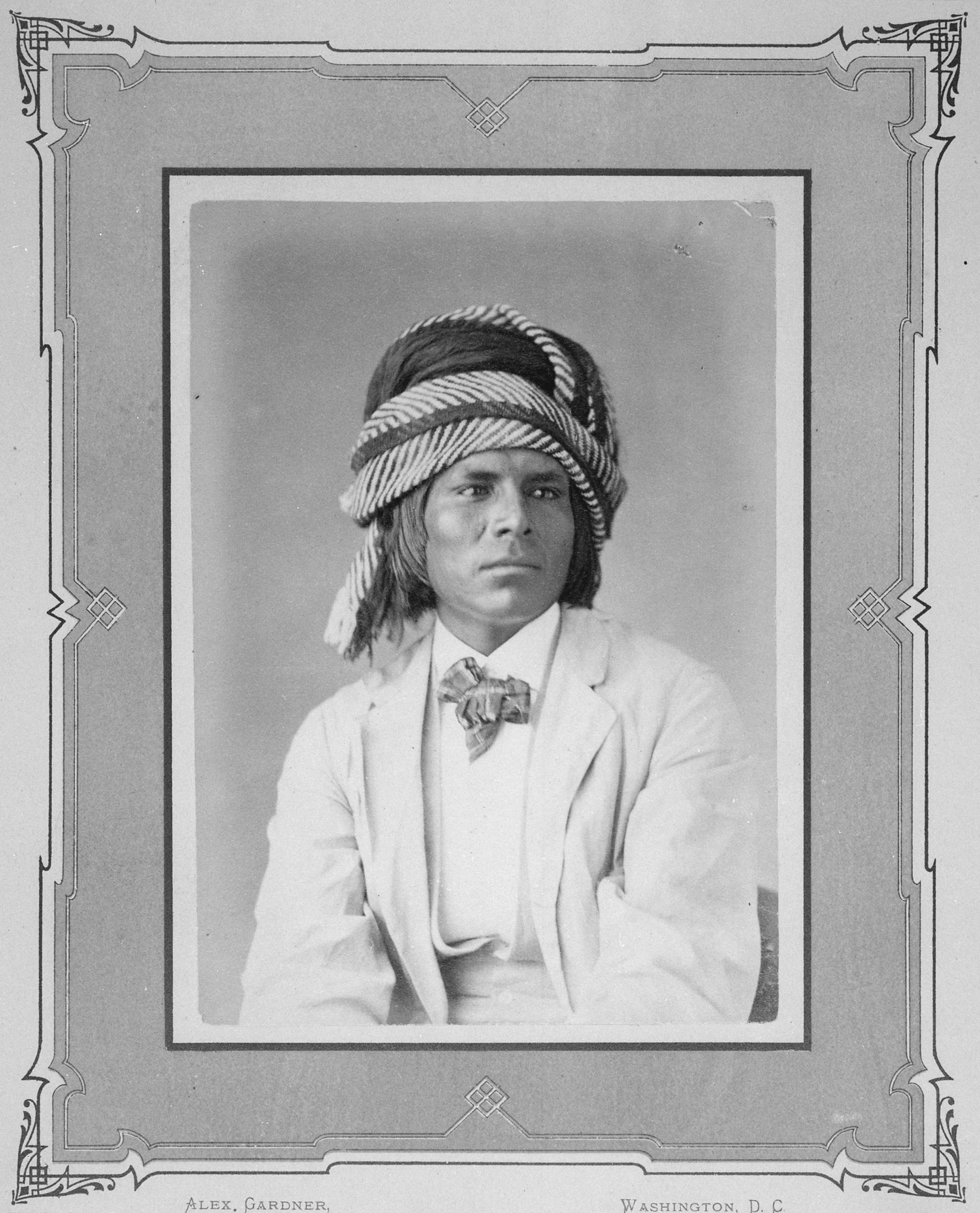
- Louis Morago (Akimel Oʼodham), 1872

Total population
- 19,921 ± 4,574 (2010)

Regions with significant populations
- United States (Arizona), Mexico (Sonora and Chihuahua)

Languages
- Oʼodham, English, Spanish

Religion
- Roman Catholicism, traditional tribal religion

Related ethnic groups
- Ak-Chin Oʼodham; Hia C-ed Oʼodham; Tohono Oʼodham

The Akimel Oʼodham or Akimel Oʼotham are an Indigenous people of the Americas living in the United States in central and southern Arizona and Northwestern Mexico in the states of Sonora and Chihuahua. The majority population of the two current bands of the Akimel Oʼodham in the United States is based in two reservations: the Keli Akimel Oʼotham on the Gila River Indian Community (GRIC) and the Onʼk Akimel Oʼodham on the Salt River Pima-Maricopa Indian Community (SRPMIC).

The Akimel Oʼodham are closely related to the Ak-Chin Oʼodham, now forming the Ak-Chin Indian Community. They are also related to the Sobaipuri, whose descendants reside on the San Xavier Indian Reservation or Wa꞉k (together with the Tohono Oʼodham), and in the Salt River Indian Community. Together with the related Tohono Oʼodham ("Desert People") and the Hia C-ed Oʼodham ("Sand Dune People"), the Akimel Oʼodham form the Upper Oʼodham.

== Name ==
Akimel Oʼotham and Akimel Oʼodham are the Oʼodham terms for "river people". Akimel O'otham is most closely aligned with the Gila River Indian Community whereas Akimel O'odham is most closely aligned with the Salt River Pima–Maricopa Indian Community.

They were formerly known as Pima, which may have come from the phrase pi ʼañi mac or pi mac, meaning "I don't know," which they used repeatedly in their initial meetings with Spanish colonists. The Spanish referred to them as the Pima. English-speaking traders, explorers, and settlers adopted this term.

The Akimel Oʼodham called themselves Othama (Note: Also Aatam or Aàtam-akimûlt.) until the first account of interaction with non-Native Americans was recorded.

== History prior to 1688 ==
Spanish missionaries recorded Pima villages known as Kina, Equituni, and Uturituc. Anglo Americans later corrupted the miscommunication into Pimos, which was adapted to Pima river people. The Akimel Oʼodham people today call their villages:

- District #1: Uʼs kehk (Blackwater)
- District #2: Hashan Kehk (Saguaro Stand)
- District #3: Gu꞉U Ki (Sacaton)
- District #4: Santan
- District #5: Vah Ki (Casa Blanca)
- District #6: Komatke (Sierra Estrella Mountains)
- District #7: Maricopa Colony

The territory of the Upper Oʼodham, also called Upper Pima or Pima Alto, was called Pimería Alta by the Spanish.

The Akimel Oʼodham had lived along the Gila, Salt, Yaqui, and Sonora rivers in ranchería-style villages. The villages were set up as a loose group of houses with familial groups sharing a central ramada and kitchen area. Brush "Olas Ki:ki" (round houses) were built around this central area. The Oʼodham were historically a patrilineal society. Familial groups tended to consist of extended families. The Akimel Oʼodham also lived seasonally in temporary field houses in order to tend their crops.

The Oʼodham language, variously called Oʼodham ñeʼokĭ, Oʼodham ñiʼokĭ or Oʼotham ñiok, is spoken by all Oʼodham groups. There are certain dialectal differences, but they are mutually intelligible and all Oʼodham groups can understand one another. Lexicographical differences have arisen among the different groups, especially in reference to newer technologies and innovations.

The ancient economy of the Akimel Oʼodham was primarily subsistence, based on farming, hunting and gathering. They also conducted extensive trading. The prehistoric peoples built an extensive irrigation system to compensate for arid conditions. It remains in use today. Over time the communities built and altered canal systems according to their changing needs.

The Akimel Oʼodham were experts in the area of textiles and produced intricate baskets as well as woven cloth. Prior to the arrival of Europeans, their primary military rivals were the Apache and Yavapai, who raided their villages at times due to competition for resources. The latter tribes were more nomadic, depending primarily on hunting and gathering, and would raid the more settled groups who cultivated foods. They established some friendly relations with the Apache.

== History after 1694 ==
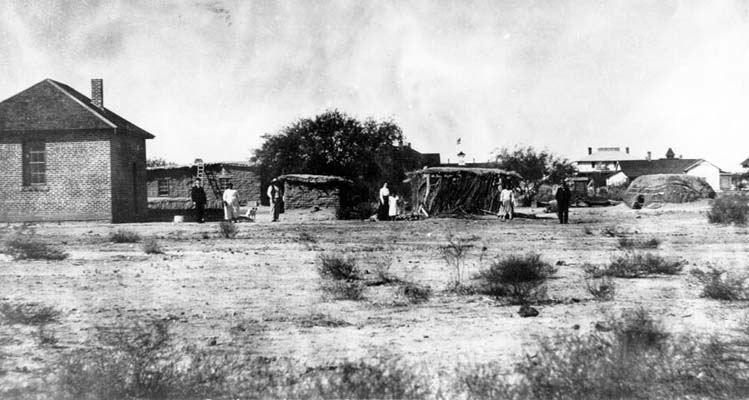
Akimel Oʼodham dwellings of traditional and brick construction in 1900

Kaviu, an O'odham elder, photographed around 1907 by Edward S. Curtis

Initially, the Akimel Oʼodham experienced little intensive colonial contact. Early encounters were limited to parties traveling through the territory or community members visiting settlements to the south. The Hispanic era (AD 1694–1853) of the Historic period began with the first visit by Father Kino to their villages in 1694. The Pima Revolt, also known as the Oʼodham Uprising or the Pima Outbreak, was a revolt of Akimel Oʼodham people in 1751 against colonial forces in Spanish Arizona and one of the major northern frontier conflicts in early New Spain.

Contact was infrequent with the Mexicans during their rule of southern Arizona between 1821 and 1853. The Akimel Oʼodham were affected by introduced European elements, such as infectious diseases to which they had no immunity, new crops (such as wheat), livestock, and use of metal tools and trade goods.

Euroamerican contacts with the Akimel Oʼodham in the middle Gila Valley increased after 1846 as a result of the Mexican–American War. The Akimel Oʼodham traded and gave aid to the expeditions of Stephen Watts Kearny and Philip St. George Cooke on their way to California. After Mexico's defeat, it ceded the territory of what is now Arizona to the United States, with the exception of the land south of the Gila River. Soon thereafter the California Gold Rush began, drawing Americans to travel to California through the Mexican territory between Mesilla and the Colorado River crossings near Yuma, on what became known as the Southern Emigrant Trail. Travelers used the villages of the Akimel Oʼodham as oases to recover from the crossing of unfamiliar deserts. They also bought new supplies and livestock to support the journey across the remaining deserts to the west.

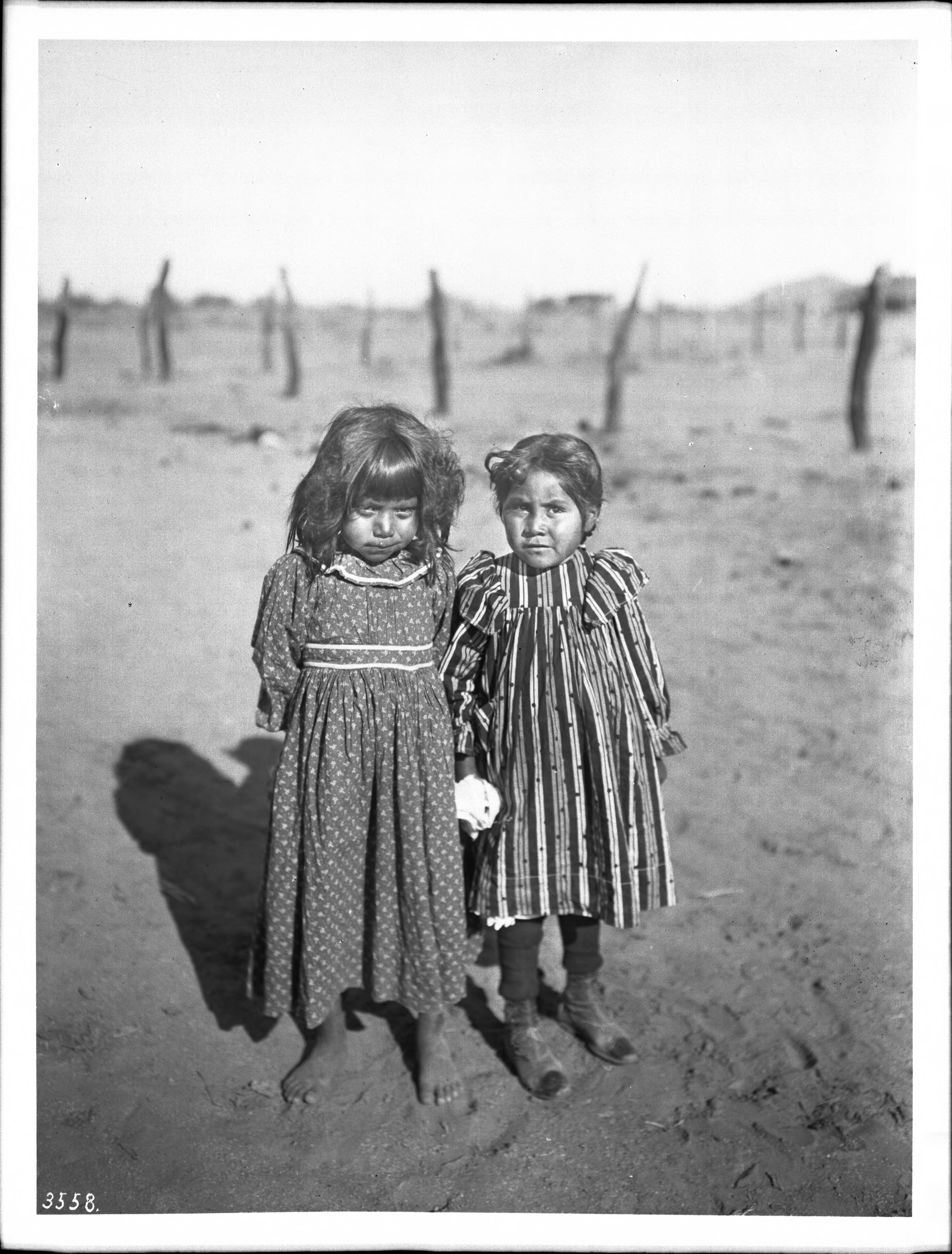
Two young Akimel Oʼodham Indian school girls, c. 1900

The American era (A.D. 1853–1950), began in 1853 with the Gadsden Purchase, when the US acquired southern Arizona. New markets were developed, initially to supply immigrants heading for California. Grain was needed for horses of the Butterfield Overland Mail and for the military during the American Civil War. As a result, the Akimel Oʼodham experienced a period of prosperity. The Gila River Indian Community (GRIC) was established in 1859. The 1860 census records the Akimel Oʼodham villages as Agua Raiz, Arenal, Casa Blanca, Cachanillo, Cerrito, Cerro Chiquito, El Llano, and Hormiguero.

After the American Civil War, numerous Euroamerican migrants came to settle upstream locations along the Gila, as well as along the lower Salt River. Due to their encroachment and competition for scarce resources, interaction between Native American groups and the Euro-American settlers became increasingly tense. The U.S. government adopted a policy of pacification and confinement of Native Americans to reservations. Uncertainty and variable crop yields led to major settlement reorganizations. The establishment of agency headquarters, churches and schools, and trading posts at Vahki (Casa Blanca) and Gu U ki (Sacaton) during the 1870s and 1880s led to the growth of these towns as administrative and commercial centers, at the expense of others.

By 1898 agriculture had nearly ceased within the GRIC. Although some Akimel Oʼodham drew rations, their principal means of livelihood was woodcutting. The first allotments of land within Gila River were established in 1914, in an attempt to break up communal land. Each individual was assigned a 10-acre (40,000 m^{2}) parcel of irrigable land located within districts irrigated by the Santan, Agency, Blackwater, and Casa Blanca projects on the eastern half of the reservation. In 1917, the allotment size was doubled to include a primary lot of irrigable land and a secondary, usually non-contiguous 10-acre (40,000 m^{2}) tract of grazing land.

The most ambitious effort to rectify the economic plight of the Akimel Oʼodham was the San Carlos Project Act of 1924, which authorized the construction of a water storage dam on the Gila River. It provided for the irrigation of 50,000 acres (200 km^{2}) of Indian and 50,000 acres (200 km^{2}) of non-Indian land. For a variety of reasons, the San Carlos Project failed to revitalize the Oʼodham farming economy. In effect the project halted the Gila river waters, and the Akimel Oʼodham no longer had a source of water for farming. This began the famine years. Many Oʼodham have believed these wrong and misguided government policies were an attempt of mass genocide.

Over the decades, the U.S. government promoted assimilation, forcing changes on to the Akimel Oʼodham in nearly every aspect of their lives. Since World War II, however, the Akimel Oʼodham have experienced a resurgence of interest in tribal sovereignty and economic development. The community has regained its self-government and are recognized as a tribe. In addition, they have developed several profitable enterprises in fields such as agriculture and telecommunications, and built several gaming casinos to generate revenues. They have begun to construct a water delivery system across the reservation in order to revive their farming economy.

== Akimel Oʼodham and the Salt River ==
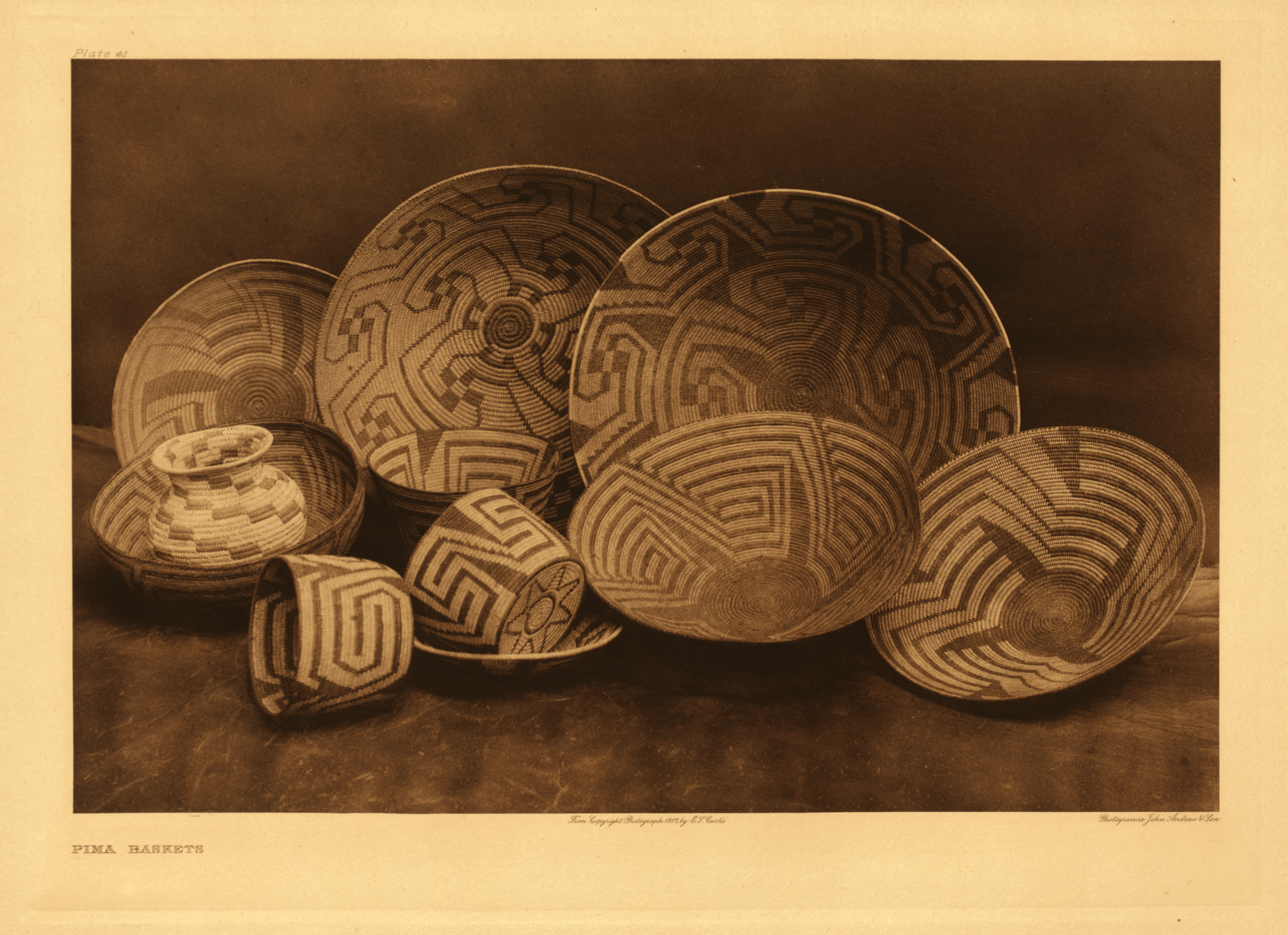
Akimel Oʼodham coiled baskets, c. 1907, photography by Edward S. Curtis

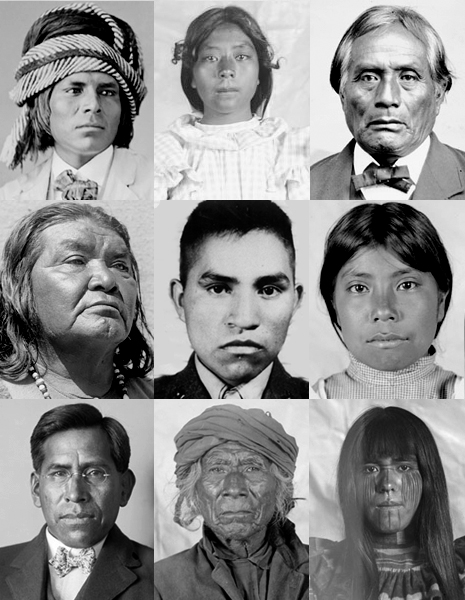
Historical portraits of Akimel Oʼodham people

The Akimel Oʼodham ("River People") have lived on the banks of the Gila and Salt Rivers since long before European contact.

Their way of life (himdagĭ, sometimes rendered in English as Him-dag) was and is centered on the river, which is holy. The term Him-dag should be clarified, as it does not have a direct translation into the English language, and is not limited to reverence of the river. It encompasses a great deal because Oʼodham him-dag intertwines religion, morals, values, philosophy, and general world view which are all interconnected. Their worldview and religious beliefs focus on the natural world.

The Gila and Salt Rivers are currently dry, due to the (San Carlos Irrigation project) upstream dams that block the flow and the diversion of water by non-native farmers. This has been a cause of great upset among all of the Oʼodham. The upstream diversion in combination with periods of drought, led to lengthy periods of famine that were a devastating change from the documented prosperity the people had experienced until non-native settlers engaged in more aggressive farming in areas that were traditionally used by the Akimel Oʼodham and Apache in Eastern Arizona. This abuse of water rights was the impetus for a nearly century long legal battle between the Gila River Indian Community and the United States government, which was settled in favor of the Akimel Oʼodham and signed into law by George W. Bush in December 2005. As a side note, at times during the monsoon season the Salt River runs, albeit at low levels. In the weeks after December 29, 2004, when an unexpected winter rainstorm flooded areas much further upstream (in Northern Arizona), water was released through dams on the river at rates higher than at any time since the filling of Tempe Town Lake in 1998, and was a cause for minor celebration in the Salt River Pima-Maricopa Indian Community. The diversion of the water and the introduction of non-native diet is said to have been the leading contributing factor in the high rate of diabetes among the Akimel Oʼodham tribe. The Pima Indians Diabetes Database was conducted on 768 women from the tribe and has been used to train machine learning algorithms on accuracy in predicting diabetes in individuals.

== Modern life ==
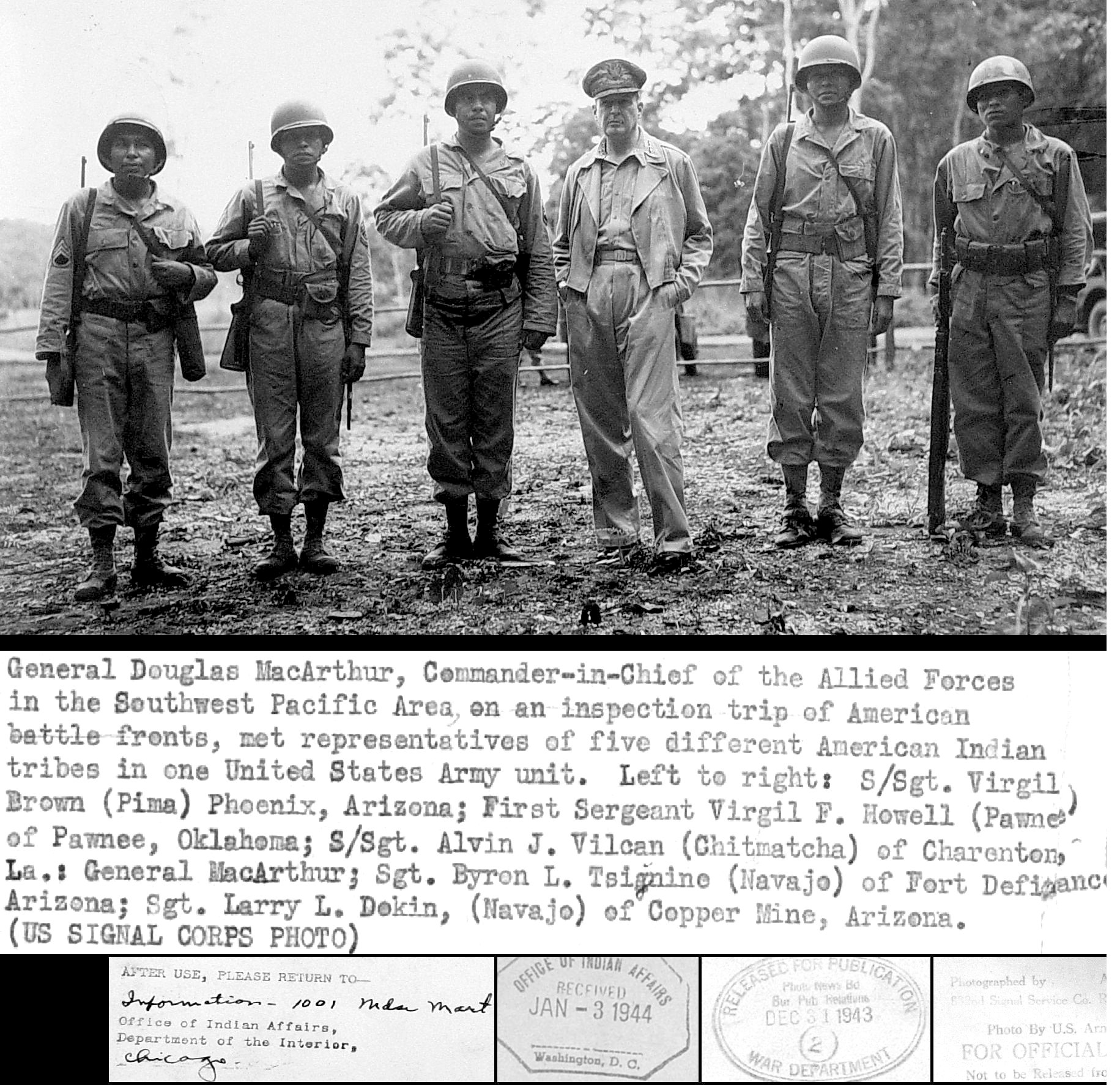
General Douglas MacArthur meeting Navajo, Akimel Oʼodham, Pawnee, and other Native American troops

As of 2014, the majority of the population lives in the federally recognized Gila River Indian Community (GRIC). In historic times a large number of Akimel Oʼodham migrated north to occupy the banks of the Salt River, where they formed the Salt River Pima-Maricopa Indian Community (SRPMIC). Both tribes are confederations of two distinct ethnicities, which include the Maricopa.

Within the Oʼodham people, four federally recognized tribes in the Southwest speak the same language: they are called the Gila River Indian Community (Keli Akimel Oʼodham – "Gila River People"); the Salt River Pima-Maricopa Indian Community (Onk Akimel Oʼodham – "Salt River People"); the Ak-Chin Indian Community (Ak-Chin Oʼodham); and the Tohono Oʼodham Nation (Tohono Oʼodham – "Desert People"). The remaining band, the Hia C-ed Oʼodham ("Sand Dune People"), are not federally recognized, but reside throughout southwestern Arizona.

Today the GRIC is a sovereign tribe residing on more than 550,000 acres (2,200 km^{2}) of land in central Arizona. The community is divided into seven districts (similar to states) with a council representing individual subgovernments. It is self-governed by an elected Governor (currently Gregory Mendoza), Lieutenant Governor (currently Stephen Roe-Lewis) and 18-member Tribal Council. The council is elected by district with the number of electees determined by district population. There are more than 19,000 enrolled citizens overall.

The Gila River Indian Community is involved in various economic development enterprises that provide entertainment and recreation: three gaming casinos, associated golf courses, a luxury resort, and a western-themed amusement park. In addition, they manage various industrial parks, landfills, and construction supply. The GRIC is also involved in agriculture and runs its own farms and other agricultural projects. The Gila River Indian Reservation is home of Maricopa (Piipaa, Piipaash or Pee-Posh – "People") and Keli Akimel Oʼodham (also Keli Akimel Au-Authm – "Gila River People", a division of the Akimel Oʼodham – "River People").

The Salt River Pima-Maricopa Indian Community is smaller in size. It also has a government of an elected President and tribal council. They operate tribal gaming, industrial projects, landfills and construction supply. The Salt River Pima-Maricopa Indian Community (SRPMIC) is home of the Onk Akimel Oʼodham (also Onʼk Akimel Au-Authm – "Salt River People", a division of the Akimel Oʼodham – "River People"), the Maricopa of Lehi (call themselves Xalychidom Piipaa or Xalychidom Piipaash – "People who live toward the water", descendants of the refugee Halchidhoma), the Tohono Oʼodham ("Desert People") and some Keli Akimel Oʼodham (also Keli Akimel Au-Authm – "Gila River People", another division of the Akimel Oʼodham – "River People").

The Ak-Chin Indian Community is located in the Santa Cruz Valley in Arizona. The community is composed mainly of Ak-Chin Oʼodham (Ak-Chin Au-Authm, also called Pima, another division of the Akimel Oʼodham – "River People") and Tohono Oʼodham, as well as some Yoeme. As of 2000, the population living in the community was 742. Ak-Chin is an Oʼodham word that means the "mouth of the arroyo" or "place where the wash loses itself in the sand or ground."

The Keli Akimel Oʼodham and the Onk Akimel Oʼodham have various environmentally based health issues related to the decline of their traditional economy and farming. They have the highest prevalence of type 2 diabetes in the world, much more than is observed in other U.S. populations. While they do not have a greater risk than other tribes, the Akimel Oʼodham people have been the subject of intensive study of diabetes, in part because they form a homogeneous group.

The general increased diabetes prevalence among Native Americans has been hypothesized as the result of the interaction of genetic predisposition (the thrifty phenotype or thrifty genotype), as suggested by anthropologist Robert Ferrell in 1984 and a sudden shift in diet during the last century from traditional agricultural crops to processed foods, together with a decline in physical activity. For comparison, genetically similar Oʼodham in Mexico have only a slighter higher prevalence of type 2 diabetes than non-Oʼodham Mexicans.

== Customs ==
Pima swastika symbol of the four winds.

Personal names are particularly important in Akimel Oʼodham society. From age ten until the time of marriage, neither boys nor girls were allowed to speak their own names out loud. Doing so can invoke bad luck to the children and their future. Similarly, people in the tribe do not say aloud the names of deceased people, in order to allow them to move on and to call their spirits back among the living.

The people give their children careful verbal instruction in moral, religious, and other matters. Akimel Oʼodham ceremonies often include set speeches, in which the speaker will recite portions of their cosmic myth. Prior to American rule, such a recounting was especially important in the preparation for war. These speeches are adapted for each occasion but the general context is the same.

Traditionally, the Akimel Oʼodham lived in a thatched wattle-and-daub houses, as seen by the early European-American settlers who ventured into their country:

Their homes are jacales which are huts made of mats of reed-grass cut in half and built in the form of a vault on arched sticks. The top is covered with these mats, thick enough to resist the weather, Inside, they have only a petate on which to sleep, and gourds in which to carry and store water.

Anthropologist Frank Hamilton Cushing noted that among the Akimel Oʼodham the symbol of the four winds is made from a cross with the four curved arms (similar to a broken sun cross) and concludes "the right-angle swastika is primarily a representation of the circle of the four wind gods standing at the head of their trails, or directions."

== See also ==
- Pima Indian Revolt
- Oʼodham language
- Man in the Maze
- List of dwellings of Pueblo peoples
