= Casa Blanca, Arizona =

CDP in Pinal County, Arizona

- CDP
- Location of Casa Blanca in Pinal County, Arizona.

- Location in the United States
- Coordinates: 33°07′13″N 111°53′17″W
- Country: United States
- State: Arizona
- County: Pinal

Area
  - Total: 15.80 sq mi (40.91 km^{2})
  - Land: 15.80 sq mi (40.91 km^{2})
  - Water: 0 sq mi (0.00 km^{2})

Population (2020)
  - Total: 1,727
  - Density: 109.3/sq mi (42.22/km^{2})
- Time zone: UTC-7 (MST (no DST))
- ZIP code: 85121
- Area code: 520
- FIPS code: 04-10460

Casa Blanca is a census-designated place (CDP) in Pinal County, Arizona, United States, located in the Gila River Indian Community. The population was 1,388 at the 2010 census.

== History ==
=== Antebellum Years ===
Casa Blanca, formerly known to the Mexicans as La Tierra Amontonada (Piled Up Land, Piled Up Dirt), named for the Hohokam ruin mound nearby, was one of the Pima Villages on the Gila River in what was then part of the state of Sonora, Mexico. It was encountered by the American expedition of Stephen W. Kearny in 1846 and later by Americans on their way to California on the Southern Emigrant Trail during the California Gold Rush. Following the Gadsden Purchase the Pima Villages became part of New Mexico Territory. In 1857, the San Antonio-San Diego Mail Line passed through the village on the way between Maricopa Wells and Tucson.

In 1858 when Lieutenant A. B. Chapman, of the 1st Dragoons, took the first census of the Pimas and Maricopas, he found a Pima population of 535; 110 warriors, 425 women and children led by a Captain named Chelan at this village now named Casa Blanca. The next year another official census was taken by the special Indian Agent that showed Casa Blanca had 491 Pimas, broken down as 50 Aged, 146 Men, 103 Women, 105 Boys, 87 Girls, led by Captain Candela. Also enumerated were 30 cattle and 46 horses. The 1860 Census showed a total Pima population of 323 composed of 71 Male heads of household, 66 Female heads, 82 Male Children 87 female children and 17 Other males and females. It also show they had 164 horses and 102 cattle and 59 farmers tilled 587 acres of improved land.

Casa Blanca became the site of the Casa Blanca Station of the Butterfield Overland Mail in 1858. It was located about 4,200 feet west-northwest of the Casa Blanca ruin mound.

The station agent of Casa Blanca Station, Silas St. John, also became Special Agent for the Pima and Maricopa Indians on February 18, 1859, and later that year built the Indian Agency buildings for the Pima Villages in the village in 1859. These consisted of two buildings with a picket fence or corral between them. located about 3,500 feet (1,100 m) northwest of the ruin mound at Casa Blanca and some 800 feet (240 m) from the stage station. One, an adobe, was a blacksmith shop, the other of jacal construction, was a carpenter shop and agency office.

In 1860, the census showed fifteen European Americans at Casa Blanca who were part of Ammi M. White's enterprise there. White, with his half-brother, Cyrus Lennan, and partner E.S. Noyes, established a trading post at Casa Blanca. White & Co. had taken over the buildings of St.John's Indian agency, (after his resignation from that post in late 1859), which included a blacksmith shop, run by Noyes.

=== White's Mill and the Civil War ===
White's Mill was established at Casa Blanca in 1861 to turn the Pima's grain into flour. At the beginning of the American Civil War, Ammi White began stockpiling flour and other food for the California Column at the mill, which became the target of a raid by the Arizona Rangers a Confederate Army detachment sent to occupy southern Arizona. Led by Captain Sherod Hunter, the raid destroyed the mill machinery, captured Ammi White and returned the flour and other food to the Pima. When Captain Hunter impersonated White and his men posed as locals, they also captured Union Army Captain William McCleave and his detachment who came to visit the mill.

Once the California Column arrived they found they had to wait to gather up flour and food to continue their march to Tucson and so they built Fort Barrett around the mill to protect their depot there. After the capture of Tucson the post was abandoned except as a post for vedettes and express riders. Ammi White was later exchanged, as the Confederate Army retreated from New Mexico Territory, returning to rebuild his mill which, with the increased production of the Pima farmers, helped to feed the Union Army and the local population of the territory during the rest of the war. After White sold the mill and moved away in 1867, it was destroyed in a flood in September 1868. Subsequently, the machinery was salvaged and moved to Adamsville.

== Demographics ==
Historical population
Census	Pop.	Note	%±
2010	1,388		—
2020	1,727		24.4%
U.S. Decennial Census

=== 2020 census ===
As of the 2020 census, Casa Blanca had a population of 1,727. The median age was 29.6 years. 33.8% of residents were under the age of 18 and 8.1% of residents were 65 years of age or older. For every 100 females there were 89.6 males, and for every 100 females age 18 and over there were 86.2 males age 18 and over.

0.0% of residents lived in urban areas, while 100.0% lived in rural areas.

There were 443 households in Casa Blanca, of which 48.1% had children under the age of 18 living in them. Of all households, 18.5% were married-couple households, 19.2% were households with a male householder and no spouse or partner present, and 47.0% were households with a female householder and no spouse or partner present. About 19.6% of all households were made up of individuals and 5.5% had someone living alone who was 65 years of age or older.

There were 445 housing units, of which 0.4% were vacant. The homeowner vacancy rate was 0.0% and the rental vacancy rate was 0.0%.

Racial composition as of the 2020 census
Race	Number	Percent
White	9	0.5%
Black or African American	1	0.1%
American Indian and Alaska Native	1,658	96.0%
Asian	2	0.1%
Native Hawaiian and Other Pacific Islander	0	0.0%
Some other race	33	1.9%
Two or more races	24	1.4%
Hispanic or Latino (of any race)	156	9.0%

=== 2010 census ===
As of the 2010 census, there were 1,388 people residing in the CDP. The population density was 87.9 people per square mile. The racial makeup of the CDP was 1.0% White, 0.3% Black or African American, 96.0% Native American, 0.1% Asian, 0.9% from other races, and 1.6% from two or more races. 13.04% of the population were Hispanic or Latino of any race.
