= Pima villages =

Historical villages of the Pima people of Arizona, US

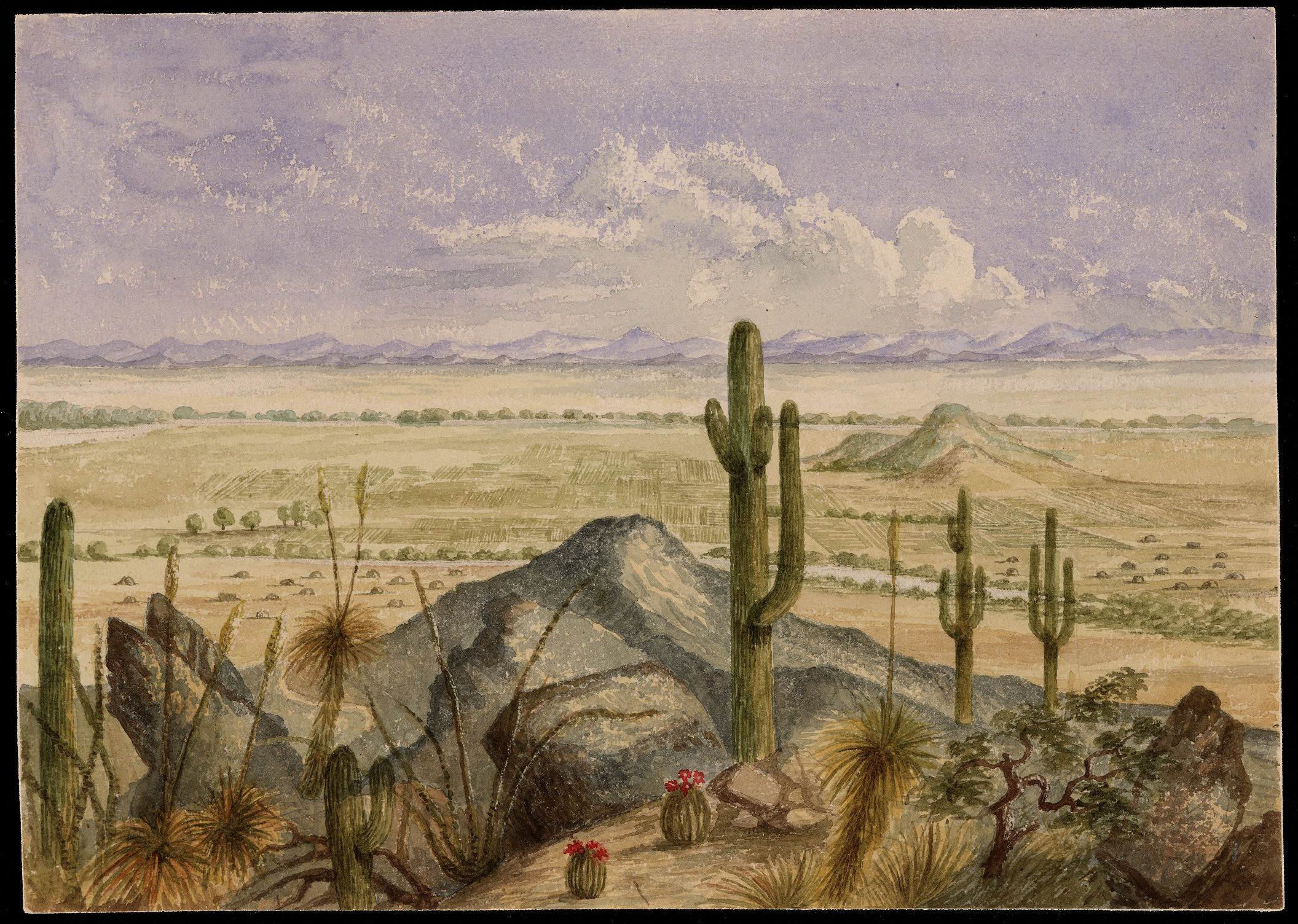
"View overlooking the Pimo villages with the Gila River in the distance; Pima Butte is in the center of the view with mountains in the background," watercolor by John Russell Bartlett, 1852

Pima Villages, sometimes mistakenly called the Pimos Villages in the 19th century, were the Akimel O’odham (Pima) and Pee-Posh (Maricopa) villages in what is now the Gila River Indian Community in Pinal County, Arizona. First, recorded by Spanish explorers in the late 17th century as living on the south side of the Gila River, they were included in the Viceroyalty of New Spain, then in Provincias of Sonora, Ostimuri y Sinaloa or New Navarre to 1823. Then from 1824 to 1830, they were part of the Estado de Occidente of Mexico and from September 1830 they were part of the state of Sonora. These were the Pima villages encountered by American fur trappers, traders, soldiers and travelers along the middle Gila River from 1830s into the later 19th century. The Mexican Cession following the Mexican American War left them part of Mexico. The 1853 Gadsden Purchase made their lands part of the United States, Territory of New Mexico. During the American Civil War, they became part of the Territory of Arizona.

== History ==
=== Spanish period, 1694 to 1821 ===
==== Late 17th century ====
Father Eusebio Kino had been tasked with establishing Spanish missions in the Sonoran Desert. In 1691–1692, he established three missions in the Pimería Alta among the Tohono O'odham (Papago) and Sobaipuri. These were the Mission San Cayetano del Tumacácori, Los Santos Ángeles de Guevavi, San Xavier del Bac, all south of the Pima Villages.

The villages of the Akimel O’odham were located along the Gila River before the Spanish explorers Father Kino and Captain Manje, the leader of Kino's military escort, first encountered them in 1694. A census taken by Manje in 1697 and 1699 found 1118 people in 5 villages along the Gila, within the boundary of the modern Gila River Indian Community. From east to west there was Tucsan or Tuesan (130 people) one league (2.5 miles) west of the Casa Grande Ruins, then Tusonimo (200 people), four leagues downstream from Tucsan, then Coatoydag (400 people, the largest), three leagues downstream from Tusonimo, then Soación or Sudaisón four leagues downstream from Coatoydag and Comacson at the foot of the Sierra Estrella six leagues downstream from Soación and three leagues (7.5 miles) upstream on the Gila from its conjunction with the Salt River. A further 132 Akimel O’odham were in the village of Oyadaibuc to the west near what is now Gila Bend. A later map by Kino showed three villages of "mixed Pimas and Opas," lay above Oyadaibuc on the Gila and two more villages of Pimas above them before Comacson was reached. The Spanish counted 530 Pimas living in the villages from Oyadaibuc to Soación on the Gila in 1699.

Captain Manje wrote that 960 Cocomaricopa or Opa lived in villages to the west along the lower Gila River between Oyadaibuc and their westernmost village Tutumaoyda or Tumagoidad, (which Kino named San Matias del Tulum). Tutumaoyda lay on the south side of the Gila River a few miles from modern Agua Caliente. A twenty-seven league (about 67.5 mile) unpopulated no man's land along the lower Gila river lay to the west between the Cocomaricopa and the Quechan or Yuma, their hostile neighbors, whose villages were on the lower Colorado River near the mouth of the Gila River. To the east of the Pima Villages lay the villages of the Sobaipuri running southward on the San Pedro River, from the junction of the San Pedro River with the Gila.

==== 18th century to 1821 ====
Pima territory in 1700 CE

===== Jacobo Sedelmayr, 1744 =====
The visiting Padre Jacobo Sedelmayr in 1744, found the Akimel O'odham of the Middle Gila River living in three rancherías, one league west of Casa Grande was one called Tuquisan (Kino's Tuesan); four leagues downstream lay Tussonimo (Kino's Tusonimo), and 10 leagues further down the Gila River, that ran entirely underground in the dry season and emerged where the largest ranchería of Sudacsón (Sudac-sson) was located. All of these rancherias had many, very fertile, irrigated fields on either bank of the river and on the islands in it. The former rancherias Coatoydag, (Kino's San Andres, near modern Blackwater) and Comacson had disappeared and the small village Kino named Soación or Sudaisón between them had grown into the large Sudac-sson. Sedelmayr observed that the agriculture of the Pima Villages had improved noting the introduction of ditch irrigation and new crops of cotton and wheat grown with irrigation at Sudac-sson. The introduction of cotton and weaving cloth from it may have been by Sobopuri refugees who had grown it before being driven out of the lower San Pedro River valley by the Apache in the 1730s.

===== Revolt =====
Some of the warriors of the Pima Villages led by Jabanimó ("Raven’s head"), an old chief, participated in the Pima Revolt in 1751. They burned the padre's house and temporary chapel at the Mission San Xavier. Later in 1756, Jabanimó attacked the mission again but was driven off with loss by the Spanish garrison of Tubac. He was then pursued to the confluence of the Salt and Gila Rivers. Peace negotiations failing, Jabanimó and his men were driven from a hilltop and fled into the local wetlands for safety. Otherwise the villages remained friendly with the Spanish but independent.

===== Apache raids and militia development =====
Under attack by the Apache, the Spanish evacuated the Sobaipuri from the valley of the upper San Pedro River to the valley of the Santa Cruz River in the early 1760s, where a new settlement developed. In 1768, where Father Kino had established the visita of Mission San Xavier del Bac. At San Cosmé del Tucson in 1692, the visita was expanded, fortified and renamed San Cosme y Damián de Tucsón. On August 20, 1775, Presidio San Augustin del Tucson was established to protect the missions and the region of the Santa Cruz River valley generally from the Apache who now began raiding there.

The attacks of the Apache on the Pima Villages also now began. Too distant to rely on the help of the garrison at Tucson, the Pima Villages developed their own unique militia organization capable of offense and defense. It had its antecedents in the Pima auxiliaries used by the Spanish garrisons from 1694. Later there was an eighty-man strong, Pima Company with Spanish officers organized in 1782. In 1787, it occupied the old presidio at Tubac serving there for more than half a century. Originally recruited from Akimel O'odham on the upper Santa Cruz, its rolls included other native people, perhaps some warriors from the Pima Villages may have enlisted.

Unlike the Sobaipuri, the Pima of the Gila villages over the next few decades developed their own military organization against the Apache. It required universal military service by able bodied males, its warriors trained with fighting skills, organization and efficiency equal to a presidial garrison. It had a system of sentinels, active patrols on the frontiers of their lands, and rapid communication between its villages. It was headed by a single leader, with both civil and military authority over all others, each village having its own Captain.

Their mode of warfare rose above the level of economic raiding or retaliation, with little of the individual search for plunder or recognition and became more of a professional operation. This system was not achieved all at once. Persistent Apache raids over decades led this military organization to reach its peak efficiency in the mid 19th century. It also led to the relocation of their villages away from the Gila River. This according to Padre Pedro Font's journal in 1775, quoted in Russell's, The Pima Indians, wherein Font says that the Pima Indians of Sutaquison (Sedelmayr's Sudac-sson) were asked the reason for moving their village away from the Gila River bank to open land away from the river. "They replied that they had changed its site because on account of the groves and woods on its banks they could defend themselves but ill against the Apaches, but that by living apart from the river they were able to have a clear field for pursuing and killing the Apaches when they came against their town."

=== Mexican period, 1821 to 1853 ===
Soon after Mexico achieved its independence, interest in reopening land communications with Alta California was revived with the arrival of a Dominican missionary, Father Félix Caballero, in Tucson in 1823. He and three companions walked from Misión Santa Catarina Virgen y Mártir in Baja California, crossing the Colorado River among the Cocopah. A military expedition under Brevet Captain José Romero, commander of the Tucson presidio, was organized to return the priest to his mission and pioneer a route to the Californias.

==== 1820s ====
The expedition record of Captain Romero says they traveled up to the Gila River and passed through the Pima Villages and then through the Maricopa villages on their way to the Colorado River. The first Maricopa village they encountered was now Hueso Parado only 7 leagues below the Pima Villages near the Gila's confluence with the Santa Cruz River, and the next Maricopa village they encountered was 25 leagues down the river near Gila Bend. From there they found the Maricopa lands extended down river to 4 leagues below Agua Caliente as they had in the 18th century.

In 1825, Colonel Mariano de Urrea, the civil and military governor of Sonora, wrote a report listing the names and locations of the Pima Villages on the road from Tucson to the Gila River and downstream along the south bank. The first village upstream on the Gila River, 36 leagues from Tucson, Buen Llano, population 400; second, 1 league downstream from Buen Llano, El Hormiguero, population 1,200; third, 0.75 leagues downstream from El Hormiguero, La Tierra Amontonada, population 1,200; fourth, 1 league downstream from La Tierra Amontonada, El Apache Parado, population 600; fifth, 1.5 leagues downstream from El Apache Parado, La Agua, population 600; sixth, 7 leagues downstream from La Agua, El Hueso Parado de Pimas y Cocomaricopas, population 900 of mixed Maricopa and Pima people.

==== California Gold Rush ====
After the 1820s, the Maricopa, under relentless pressure from the Yuma and other tribes, and population loss from epidemics, had been compelled to leave the Gila below Gila Bend and join the Pima in the Middle Gila region. By the time of the California Gold Rush the Maricopa villages, were all located east of the Sierra Estrella, on the Gila River, below the Pima Villages.

In December 1849, Benjamin Ignatius Hayes who was traveling to California through the Pima Villages, wrote in the diary of is trip to California:

"There are eight villages of Pimos, and more than 10,000 souls, so the interpreter (who is a Maricopa) informs us; the villages are all on this side of the river, and of course in Mexican territory... The Maricopas, the interpreter says, number a thousand, in three villages."

With the forty-niners came cholera, transmitted from Europe to places like New York and New Orleans, then to Missouri or Texas where it claimed many lives, then by trails through the Southwest and Northern Mexico to California. In the next years 200,000 victims died of cholera in Mexico, including many in the villages of the Pima and Maricopa along the Southern Emigrant Trail.

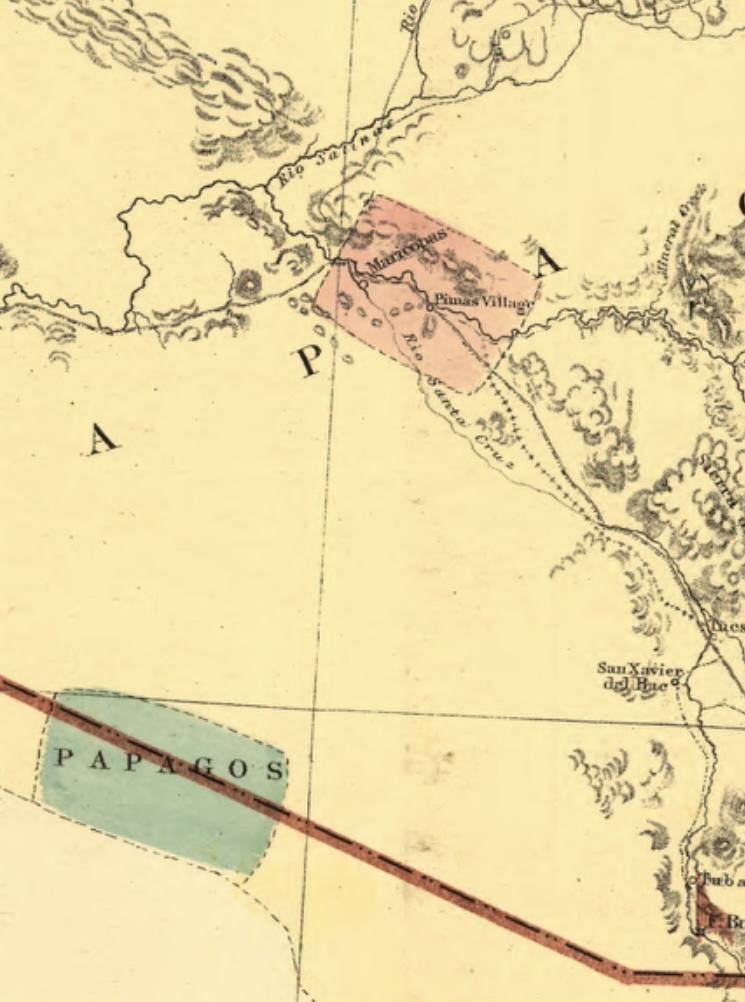
Maricopa and Pimas Villages, Military District of New Mexico, mapped 1858

=== American period, from 1853 ===
Even after they had moved to the vicinity of the Pima Villages, the Maricopa were attacked by the Yuma and their allies, but for the last time, when the coalition of their enemies were defeated on June 1, 1857, in the Battle of Pima Butte by the allied army of Pima–Maricopa warriors. Fugitive Maricopa people from villages destroyed in the war, settled above the Pima Villages at Socatoon, which appeared in the first American census soon after its founding.

==== 1857 Chapman census ====
A few months after the Battle of Pima Butte, Lieutenant A. B. Chapman, First Dragoons, U. S. Army, made the first U. S. census of the Maricopas, Pimas and Papagos which was submitted to and appeared in the report of G. Bailey, Special Agent Indian Department. That census listed their captains, warriors, women and children, and total population. It found 8 Pima villages, and 2 Maricopa villages, (El Juez Tarado being a village for both tribes), on a 15-mile stretch of the Gila River. The Pima Villages listed were:

| Village name | Captains | Warriors | Women and children | Total |
|---|---|---|---|---|
| | Antonio Soule, Head Chief | | | |
| Buen Llano | Ojo de Burro, Yaiela del Arispa | 132 | 259 | 391 |
| Ormejera No. 1 | Miguel, Xavier | 140 | 503 | 643 |
| Ormejera No. 2 | Cabeza del Aquila | 37 | 175 | 212 |
| Casa Blanca | Chelan | 110 | 425 | 535 |
| Chemisez | Tabacaro | 102 | 210 | 312 |
| El Juez Tarado | Cadrillo del Mundo, Ariba Aqua Bolando | 105 | 158 | 263 |
| Arizo del Aqua | Francisco | 235 | 535 | 770 |
| Aranca No. 1 | La Mano del Mundo | 291 | 700 | 991 |
| Aranca No. 2 | Boca Dulce | – | – | – |
| Total | | 1,152 | 2,965 | 4,117 |

The Maricopa Villages listed were:

| Village name | Captains | Warriors | Women and children | Total |
|---|---|---|---|---|
| El Juez Tarado | Juan Chevereah, Head Chief | 116 | 198 | 314 |
| Socatoon | Juan Jose | 76 | 128 | 204 |
| Total | | 192 | 326 | 518 |

==== St. John census ====
The Pima Villages and some of their lands were included in the Gila River Indian Reservation in 1859. An Indian Agency was established at Casa Blanca with Silas St. John, (station agent of the Butterfield Overland Mail at Casa Blanca Station), appointed on February 18, 1859, as Special Agent for the Pima and Maricopa Indians. Agent St. John also conducted a census of the villages later that year, when presents were being distributed among the villages by the Indian Agency, showing 3,770 Pimas and the 472 Maricopas. This population census is thought to be inaccurate, probably due to this distribution of presents, showing almost 400 fewer persons than the 1858 count, too few children and overstating the adult population. The census records the Pima Villages as: Buen Llano, Hormiguero, Hormiguerito, Casa Blanca, Cochinilla, Arenal No. 1, El Cerro No. 1, El Cerro No. 2, Arizo del Agua, Arenal No. 2. The Maricopa Villages were: Sacaton and Huesoparada. El Cerro No. 1 and No. 2. made ten villages for the Pima. Beside Hormiguerito they were the smallest villages, apparently new villages, indicating the expansion of farms for the trade with the Mail company and the military in the late 1850s.

That year the reservation was also first surveyed for the Indian Agency, by A. B. Gray, at that time a surveyor of mining properties in Arizona, and who was formerly with the Mexican Boundary Commission.

==== 1860 census ====
The 1860 U. S. census records the Pima Villages and their populations as: Agua Raiz, population 523, Arenal, population 577, Casa Blanca, population 323, Cachanillo, population 504, Cerrito, population 257, Cerro Chiquito, population 232, El Llano, population 394, and Hormiguero, population 510. The remaining Maricopa also occupied two other villages in the same locale: Hueso Parado, population 250 and Sacaton, population 144.

==== After 1860 ====
Following the American Civil War a traveller's guide to the American West published in 1866 reported that it was 423 miles from San Diego Barracks to Pimo Villages via the roads of the day.
