= Rincon Peak =

Mountain in Arizona, United States

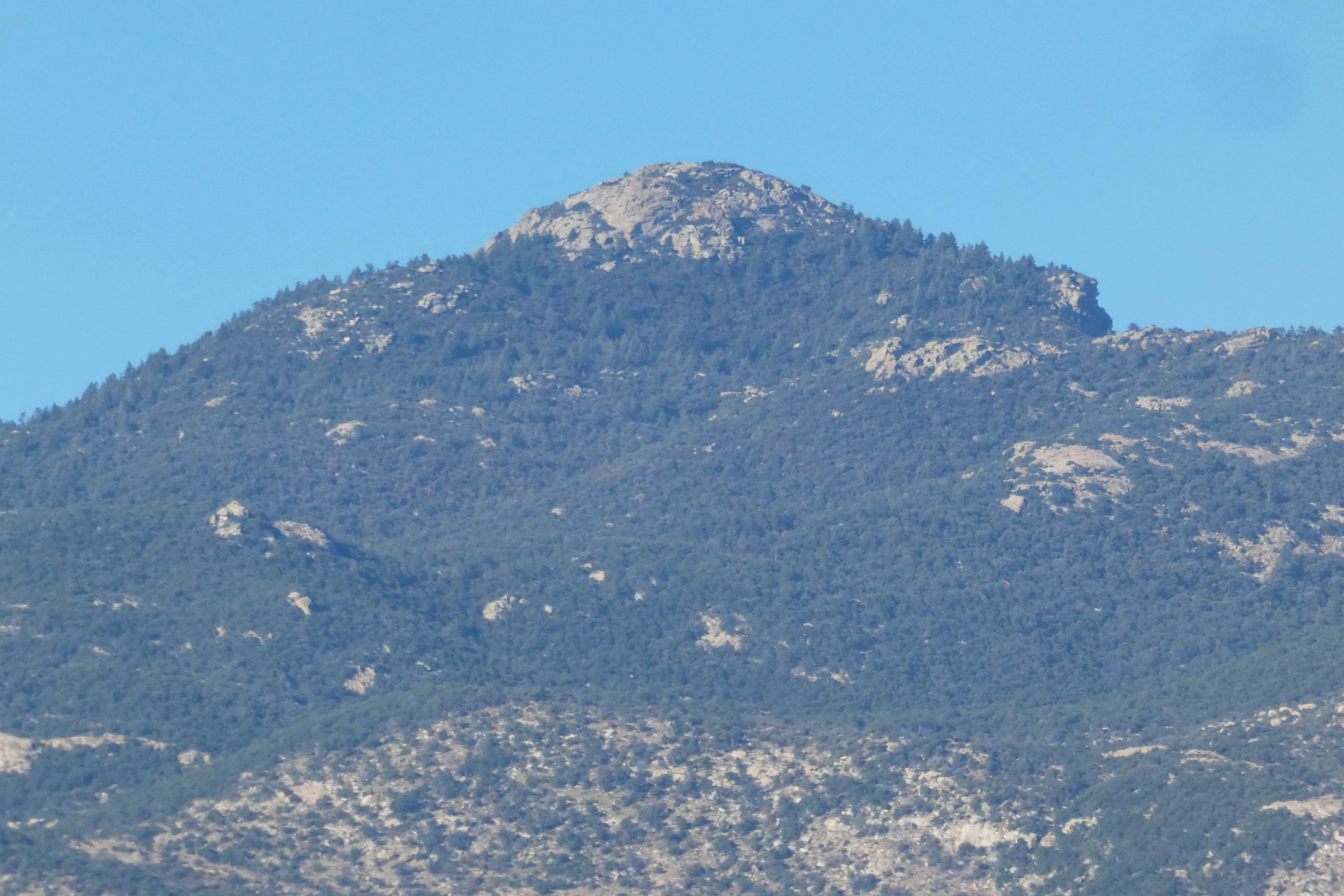
- Southwest aspect

Highest point
- Elevation: 8,482 ft (2,585 m)
- Prominence: 2,302 ft (702 m)
- Parent peak: Mica Mountain (8,668 ft)
- Isolation: 7.02 mi (11.30 km)
- Coordinates: 32°07′11″N 110°31′23″W

Geography
- Location within Arizona Location within the United States
- Country: United States
- State: Arizona
- County: Pima
- Protected area: Saguaro National Park
- Parent range: Rincon Mountains
- Topo map: USGS Rincon Peak

Geology
- Mountain type: Fault block
- Rock type(s): Metamorphic rock, Granite

Climbing
- Easiest route: Trail (class 1)

Rincon Peak is an 8,482-foot-elevation (2,585-meter) mountain summit in Pima County, Arizona, United States.

== Description ==
Rincon Peak is located in the Rincon Mountains, 25 miles (40 km) east-southeast of Tucson in Saguaro National Park. It ranks as the second-highest peak within the park, second-highest in the range, and fourth-highest in the county. The nearest higher neighbor is Mica Mountain 6.84 miles (11 km) to the north. Precipitation runoff from this mountain drains into the Gila River watershed. Topographic relief is significant as the summit rises 3,000 feet (914 meters) above Paige Creek in one mile (1.6 km) and 3,400 feet (1,036 meters) above Rincon Valley in three miles (4.8 km). Because of the higher elevation on Rincon Peak, animals such as the black bear, Mexican spotted owl, Arizona mountain king snake, and white-tailed deer make this mountain their habitat. An ascent of the peak involves an 8.1-mile hike (one-way) with 4,288-feet of elevation gain via the Rincon Peak Trail in combination with the Miller Creek Trail. The mountain's toponym has been officially adopted by the United States Board on Geographic Names. Rincón is Spanish for "corner", referring to the topographic outline of the mountain range.

== Climate ==
According to the Köppen climate classification system, Rincon Peak is located in a Hot-summer Mediterranean climate zone which is surrounded by the Sonoran Desert. This climate supports a pine and conifer forest on the peak's slopes. Climbers can expect afternoon rain and lightning from the seasonal monsoon in late July and August.

== See also ==
- List of mountain peaks of Arizona

== Gallery ==
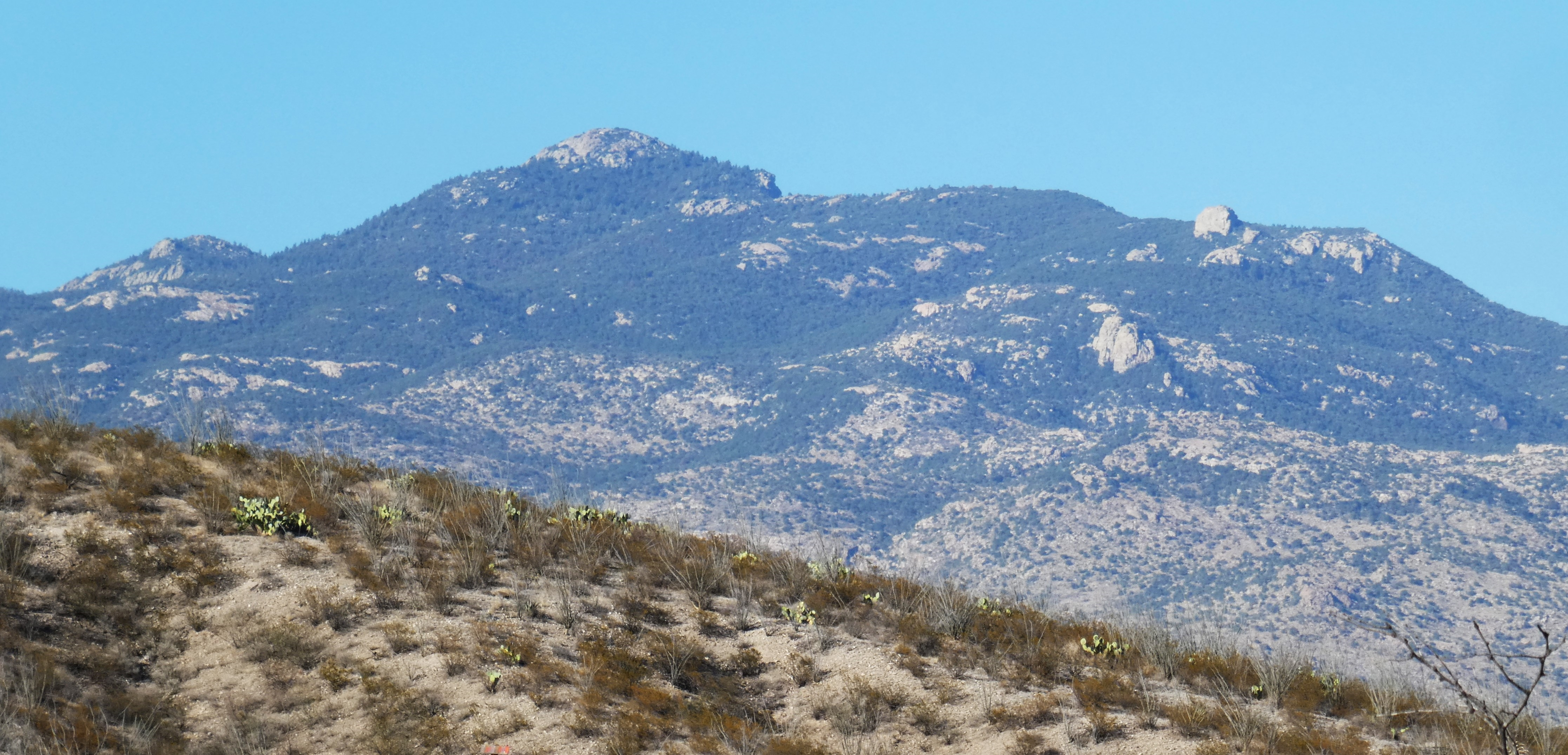
Southwest aspect

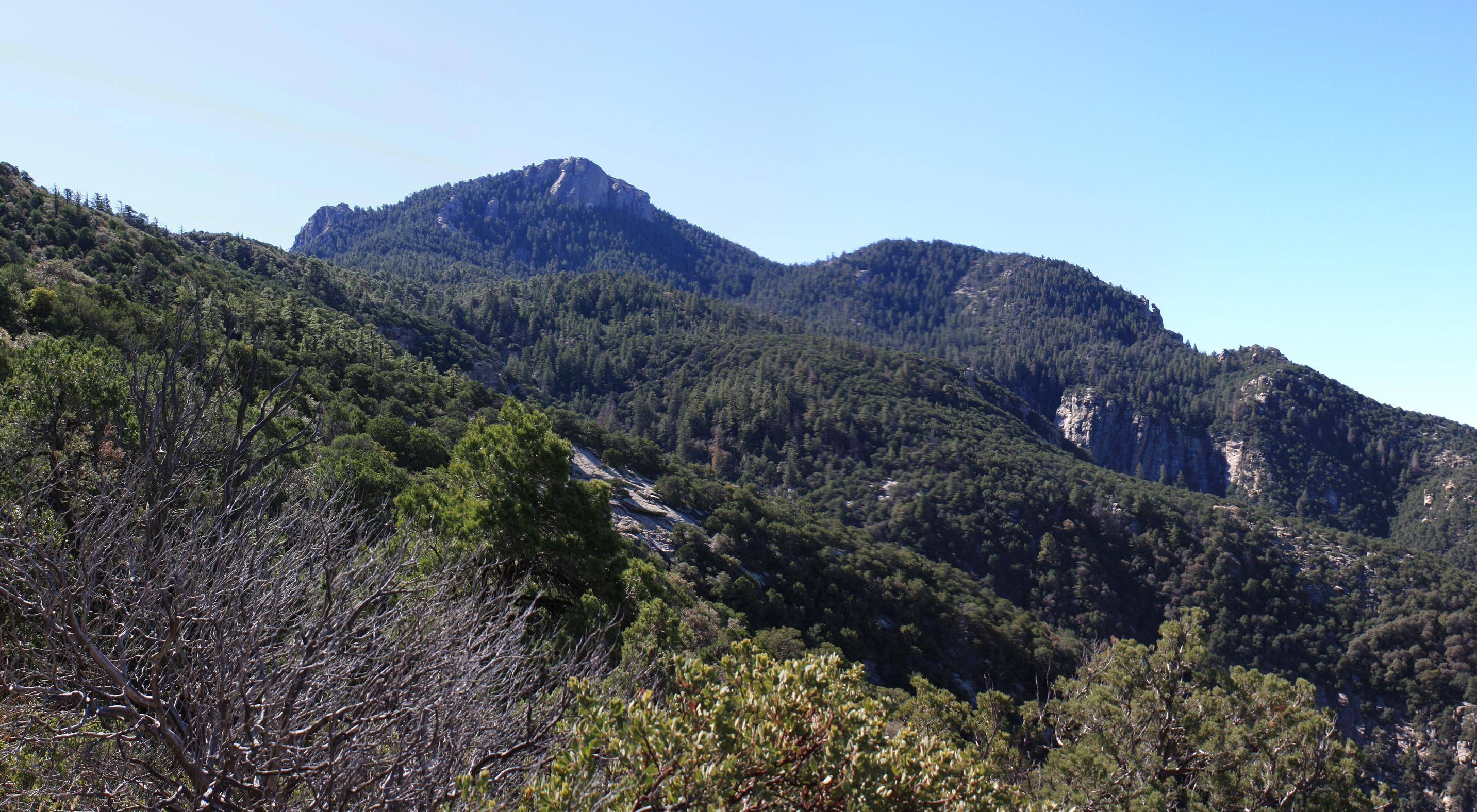
North aspect
