= List of mountain peaks of Arizona =

Mountain summits in Arizona, United States

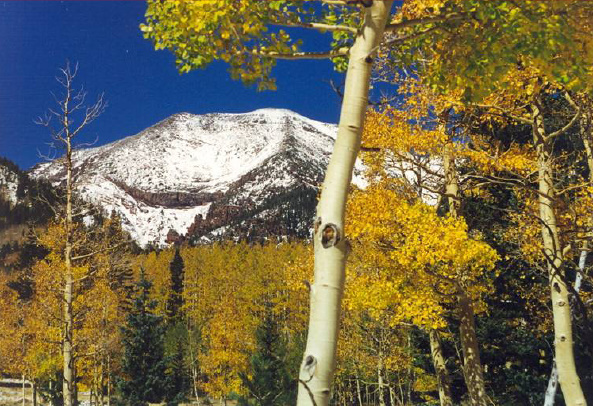
Humphreys Peak is the highest summit of the U.S. State of Arizona.

This article comprises three sortable tables of major mountain peaks of the U.S. State of Arizona.

The summit of a mountain or hill may be measured in three principal ways:

1. The topographic elevation of a summit measures the height of the summit above a geodetic sea level. The first table below ranks the 20 highest major summits of Arizona by elevation.
2. The topographic prominence of a summit is a measure of how high the summit rises above its surroundings. The second table below ranks the 20 most prominent summits of Arizona.
3. The topographic isolation (or radius of dominance) of a summit measures how far the summit lies from its nearest point of equal elevation. The third table below ranks the 20 most isolated major summits of Arizona.

== Highest major summits ==
Of the highest major summits of Arizona, Humphreys Peak exceeds 3500 meters (11,483 feet) of elevation, five peaks exceed 3000 meters (9843 feet), and 14 peaks exceed 2500 meters (8202 feet) of elevation.

The 20 highest summits of Arizona with at least 500 meters of topographic prominence
Rank	Mountain peak	Mountain range	Elevation	Prominence	Isolation	Location
1	Humphreys Peak (Note: The summit of Humphreys Peak is the highest point of the San Francisco Peaks and the U.S. State of Arizona.) (Note: The elevation of Humphreys Peak includes an adjustment of +1.345 m (4.41 ft) from NGVD 29 to NAVD 88.)	San Francisco Peaks	12,637 ft 3852 m	6,039 ft 1841 m	246 mi 396 km	35.3464°N 111.6780°W
2	Baldy Peak (Note: The summit of Baldy Peak is the highest point of the White Mountains.)	White Mountains	11,409 ft 3477.4 m	4,728 ft 1441 m	154 mi 248 km	33.9059°N 109.5626°W
3	Escudilla Mountain	White Mountains	10,886 ft 3318 m	2,382 ft 726 m	24.6 mi 39.6 km	33.9473°N 109.1217°W
4	Mount Graham (Note: The summit of Mount Graham is the highest point of the Pinaleño Mountains.)	Pinaleño Mountains	10,724 ft 3268.6 m	6,340 ft 1932 m	82.4 mi 132.6 km	32.7017°N 109.8714°W
5	Kendrick Peak	Colorado Plateau	10,425 ft 3177.4 m	2,488 ft 758 m	10.66 mi 17.15 km	35.4081°N 111.8510°W
6	Roof Butte (Note: The summit of Roof Butte is the highest point of the Chuska Mountains.)	Chuska Mountains	9,787 ft 2983.1 m	3,170 ft 966 m	59.3 mi 95.5 km	36.4602°N 109.0931°W
7	Chiricahua Peak (Note: The summit of Chiricahua Peak is the highest point of the Chiricahua Mountains.) (Note: The elevation of Chiricahua Peak includes an adjustment of +1.173 m (3.85 ft) from NGVD 29 to NAVD 88.)	Chiricahua Mountains	9,763 ft 2976 m	5,149 ft 1569 m	64.2 mi 103.3 km	31.8456°N 109.2910°W
8	Miller Peak (Note: The summit of Miller Peak is the highest point of the Huachuca Mountains.) (Note: The elevation of Miller Peak includes an adjustment of +1.067 m (3.5 ft) from NGVD 29 to NAVD 88.)	Huachuca Mountains	9,470 ft 2886 m	5,011 ft 1527 m	66.5 mi 107 km	31.3928°N 110.2930°W
9	Mount Wrightson (Note: The summit of Mount Wrightson is the highest point of the Santa Rita Mountains.) (Note: The elevation of Mount Wrightson includes an adjustment of +1.073 m (3.52 ft) from NGVD 29 to NAVD 88.)	Santa Rita Mountains	9,457 ft 2882 m	4,591 ft 1399 m	38.8 mi 62.5 km	31.6959°N 110.8482°W
10	Kaibab Plateau high point (Note: The elevation of Kaibab Plateau high point includes an adjustment of +1.301 m (4.27 ft) from NGVD 29 to NAVD 88.)	Kaibab Plateau	9,224 ft 2812 m	3,610 ft 1100 m	69.1 mi 111.2 km	36.3958°N 112.1509°W
11	Mount Lemmon (Note: The summit of Mount Lemmon is the highest point of the Santa Catalina Mountains.) (Note: The elevation of Mount Lemmon includes an adjustment of +1.004 m (3.29 ft) from NGVD 29 to NAVD 88.)	Santa Catalina Mountains	9,160 ft 2792 m	5,177 ft 1578 m	51.5 mi 82.9 km	32.4430°N 110.7885°W
12	Mica Mountain (Note: The summit of Mica Mountain is the highest point of the Rincon Mountains.) (Note: The elevation of Mica Mountain includes an adjustment of +0.96 m (3.15 ft) from NGVD 29 to NAVD 88.)	Rincon Mountains	8,667 ft 2642 m	4,608 ft 1405 m	20.6 mi 33.2 km	32.2199°N 110.5435°W
13	Hualapai Peak (Note: The summit of Hualapai Peak is the highest point of the Hualapai Mountains.)	Hualapai Mountains	8,426 ft 2568.2 m	4,439 ft 1353 m	95.2 mi 153.2 km	35.0751°N 113.8979°W
14	Mount Turnbull (Note: The summit of Mount Turnbull is the highest point of the Santa Teresa Mountains.) (Note: The elevation of Mount Turnbull includes an adjustment of +0.747 m (2.45 ft) from NGVD 29 to NAVD 88.)	Santa Teresa Mountains	8,284 ft 2525 m	3,582 ft 1092 m	25.7 mi 41.4 km	33.0741°N 110.2610°W
15	Black Mesa high point (Note: The elevation of Black Mesa high point includes an adjustment of +0.999 m (3.28 ft) from NGVD 29 to NAVD 88.)	Black Mesa	8,171 ft 2491 m	1,818 ft 554 m	41 mi 66 km	36.6514°N 110.2630°W
16	Mount Trumbull (Note: The summit of Mount Trumbull is the highest point of the Unikaret Plateau.)	Unikaret Plateau	8,038 ft 2449.9 m	2,974 ft 906 m	45.9 mi 73.8 km	36.4101°N 113.1385°W
17	Mount Union (Note: The summit of Mount Union is the highest point of the Bradshaw Mountains.)	Bradshaw Mountains	7,986 ft 2434.2 m	2,949 ft 899 m	54.4 mi 87.5 km	34.4150°N 112.4045°W
18	Mazatzal Peak (Note: The summit of Mazatzal Peak is the highest point of the Mazatzal Mountains.)	Mazatzal Mountains	7,908 ft 2410.4 m	3,963 ft 1208 m	27.2 mi 43.7 km	34.0626°N 111.4615°W
19	Pinal Peak (Note: The summit of Pinal Peak is the highest point of the Pinal Mountains.) (Note: The elevation of Pinal Peak includes an adjustment of +0.759 m (2.49 ft) from NGVD 29 to NAVD 88.)	Pinal Mountains	7,853 ft 2393 m	4,110 ft 1253 m	35.1 mi 56.4 km	33.2824°N 110.8213°W
20	Aztec Peak (Note: The summit of Aztec Peak is the highest point of the Sierra Ancha.) (Note: The elevation of Aztec Peak includes an adjustment of +0.805 m (2.64 ft) from NGVD 29 to NAVD 88.)	Sierra Ancha	7,751 ft 2362 m	2,488 ft 758 m	35.9 mi 57.8 km	33.8122°N 110.9079°W

== Most prominent summits ==
Of the most prominent summits of Arizona, five peaks are ultra-prominent summits with more than 1500 meters (4921 feet) of topographic prominence and 18 peaks exceed 1000 meters (3281 feet) of topographic prominence.

The 20 most topographically prominent summits of Arizona
Rank	Mountain peak	Mountain range	Elevation	Prominence	Isolation	Location
1	Mount Graham	Pinaleño Mountains	10,724 ft 3268.6 m	6,340 ft 1932 m	82.4 mi 132.6 km	32.7017°N 109.8714°W
2	Humphreys Peak	San Francisco Peaks	12,637 ft 3852 m	6,039 ft 1841 m	246 mi 396 km	35.3464°N 111.6780°W
3	Mount Lemmon	Santa Catalina Mountains	9,160 ft 2792 m	5,177 ft 1578 m	51.5 mi 82.9 km	32.4430°N 110.7885°W
4	Chiricahua Peak	Chiricahua Mountains	9,763 ft 2976 m	5,149 ft 1569 m	64.2 mi 103.3 km	31.8456°N 109.2910°W
5	Miller Peak	Huachuca Mountains	9,470 ft 2886 m	5,011 ft 1527 m	66.5 mi 107 km	31.3928°N 110.2930°W
6	Baldy Peak	White Mountains	11,409 ft 3477.4 m	4,728 ft 1441 m	154 mi 248 km	33.9059°N 109.5626°W
7	Mica Mountain	Rincon Mountains	8,667 ft 2642 m	4,608 ft 1405 m	20.6 mi 33.2 km	32.2199°N 110.5435°W
8	Mount Wrightson	Santa Rita Mountains	9,457 ft 2882 m	4,591 ft 1399 m	38.8 mi 62.5 km	31.6959°N 110.8482°W
9	Hualapai Peak	Hualapai Mountains	8,426 ft 2568.2 m	4,439 ft 1353 m	95.2 mi 153.2 km	35.0751°N 113.8979°W
10	Baboquivari Peak (Note: The summit of Baboquivari Peak is the highest point of the Baboquivari Mountains.) (Note: The elevation of Baboquivari Peak includes an adjustment of +0.864 m (2.83 ft) from NGVD 29 to NAVD 88.)	Baboquivari Mountains	7,737 ft 2358 m	4,204 ft 1281 m	42 mi 67.5 km	31.7710°N 111.5958°W
11	Pinal Peak	Pinal Mountains	7,853 ft 2393 m	4,110 ft 1253 m	35.1 mi 56.4 km	33.2824°N 110.8213°W
12	Mazatzal Peak	Mazatzal Mountains	7,908 ft 2410.4 m	3,963 ft 1208 m	27.2 mi 43.7 km	34.0626°N 111.4615°W
13	Mount Tipton (Note: The summit of Mount Tipton is the highest point of the Cerbat Mountains.)	Cerbat Mountains	7,153 ft 2180.2 m	3,638 ft 1109 m	33.8 mi 54.5 km	35.5389°N 114.1927°W
14	Kaibab Plateau high point	Kaibab Plateau	9,224 ft 2812 m	3,610 ft 1100 m	69.1 mi 111.2 km	36.3958°N 112.1509°W
15	Mount Turnbull	Santa Teresa Mountains	8,284 ft 2525 m	3,582 ft 1092 m	25.7 mi 41.4 km	33.0741°N 110.2610°W
16	Signal Peak (Note: The summit of Signal Peak is the highest point of the Kofa Mountains.)	Kofa Mountains	4,882 ft 1487.9 m	3,487 ft 1063 m	51.8 mi 83.3 km	33.3592°N 114.0829°W
17	Harquahala Mountain (Note: The summit of Harquahala Mountain is the highest point of the Harquahala Mountains.) (Note: The elevation of Harquahala Mountain includes an adjustment of +0.768 m (2.52 ft) from NGVD 29 to NAVD 88.)	Harquahala Mountains	5,684 ft 1732 m	3,471 ft 1058 m	42.9 mi 69 km	33.8118°N 113.3469°W
18	Browns Peak	Mazatzal Mountains	7,659 ft 2334.5 m	3,317 ft 1011 m	25.6 mi 41.1 km	33.6844°N 111.3257°W
19	Sierra Estrella high point (Note: The elevation of Sierra Estrella high point includes an adjustment of +0.657 m (2.16 ft) from NGVD 29 to NAVD 88.)	Sierra Estrella	4,514 ft 1376 m	3,217 ft 981 m	47.4 mi 76.3 km	33.2735°N 112.2807°W
20	Roof Butte	Chuska Mountains	9,787 ft 2983.1 m	3,170 ft 966 m	59.3 mi 95.5 km	36.4602°N 109.0931°W

== Most isolated major summits ==
Of the most isolated major summits of Arizona, Humphreys Peak and Baldy Peak exceed 200 kilometers (124.3 miles) of topographic isolation and seven peaks exceed 100 kilometers (62.14 miles) of topographic isolation.

The 20 most topographically isolated summits of Arizona with at least 500 meters of topographic prominence
Rank	Mountain peak	Mountain range	Elevation	Prominence	Isolation	Location
1	Humphreys Peak	San Francisco Peaks	12,637 ft 3852 m	6,039 ft 1841 m	246 mi 396 km	35.3464°N 111.6780°W
2	Baldy Peak	White Mountains	11,409 ft 3477.4 m	4,728 ft 1441 m	154 mi 248 km	33.9059°N 109.5626°W
3	Hualapai Peak	Hualapai Mountains	8,426 ft 2568.2 m	4,439 ft 1353 m	95.2 mi 153.2 km	35.0751°N 113.8979°W
4	Mount Graham	Pinaleño Mountains	10,724 ft 3268.6 m	6,340 ft 1932 m	82.4 mi 132.6 km	32.7017°N 109.8714°W
5	Kaibab Plateau high point	Kaibab Plateau	9,224 ft 2812 m	3,610 ft 1100 m	69.1 mi 111.2 km	36.3958°N 112.1509°W
6	Miller Peak	Huachuca Mountains	9,470 ft 2886 m	5,011 ft 1527 m	66.5 mi 107 km	31.3928°N 110.2930°W
7	Chiricahua Peak	Chiricahua Mountains	9,763 ft 2976 m	5,149 ft 1569 m	64.2 mi 103.3 km	31.8456°N 109.2910°W
8	Mount Ajo (Note: The elevation of Mount Ajo includes an adjustment of +0.793 m (2.6 ft) from NGVD 29 to NAVD 88.)	Ajo Range	4,811 ft 1466 m	2,703 ft 824 m	61.2 mi 98.5 km	32.0268°N 112.6906°W
9	Roof Butte	Chuska Mountains	9,787 ft 2983.1 m	3,170 ft 966 m	59.3 mi 95.5 km	36.4602°N 109.0931°W
10	Mount Union	Bradshaw Mountains	7,986 ft 2434.2 m	2,949 ft 899 m	54.4 mi 87.5 km	34.4150°N 112.4045°W
11	Signal Peak	Kofa Mountains	4,882 ft 1487.9 m	3,487 ft 1063 m	51.8 mi 83.3 km	33.3592°N 114.0829°W
12	Mount Lemmon	Santa Catalina Mountains	9,160 ft 2792 m	5,177 ft 1578 m	51.5 mi 82.9 km	32.4430°N 110.7885°W
13	Sierra Estrella high point	Sierra Estrella	4,514 ft 1376 m	3,217 ft 981 m	47.4 mi 76.3 km	33.2735°N 112.2807°W
14	Mount Trumbull	Unikaret Plateau	8,038 ft 2449.9 m	2,974 ft 906 m	45.9 mi 73.8 km	36.4101°N 113.1385°W
15	Harquahala Mountain	Harquahala Mountains	5,684 ft 1732 m	3,471 ft 1058 m	42.9 mi 69 km	33.8118°N 113.3469°W
16	Baboquivari Peak	Baboquivari Mountains	7,737 ft 2358 m	4,204 ft 1281 m	42 mi 67.5 km	31.7710°N 111.5958°W
17	Black Mesa high point	Black Mesa	8,171 ft 2491 m	1,818 ft 554 m	41 mi 66 km	36.6514°N 110.2630°W
18	Mount Wrightson	Santa Rita Mountains	9,457 ft 2882 m	4,591 ft 1399 m	38.8 mi 62.5 km	31.6959°N 110.8482°W
19	Aztec Peak	Sierra Ancha	7,751 ft 2362 m	2,488 ft 758 m	35.9 mi 57.8 km	33.8122°N 110.9079°W
20	Pinal Peak	Pinal Mountains	7,853 ft 2393 m	4,110 ft 1253 m	35.1 mi 56.4 km	33.2824°N 110.8213°W

== Gallery ==
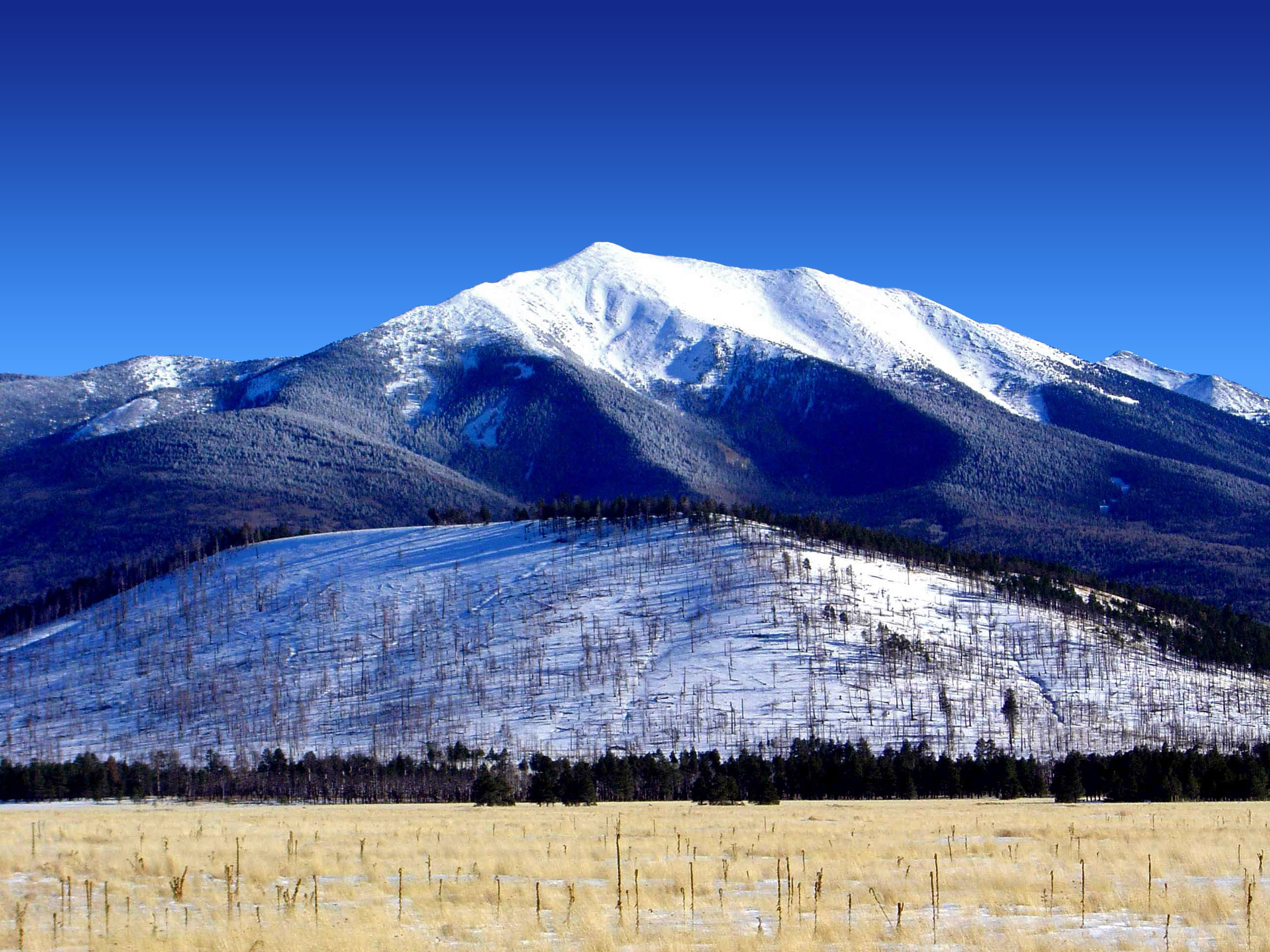
Humphreys Peak

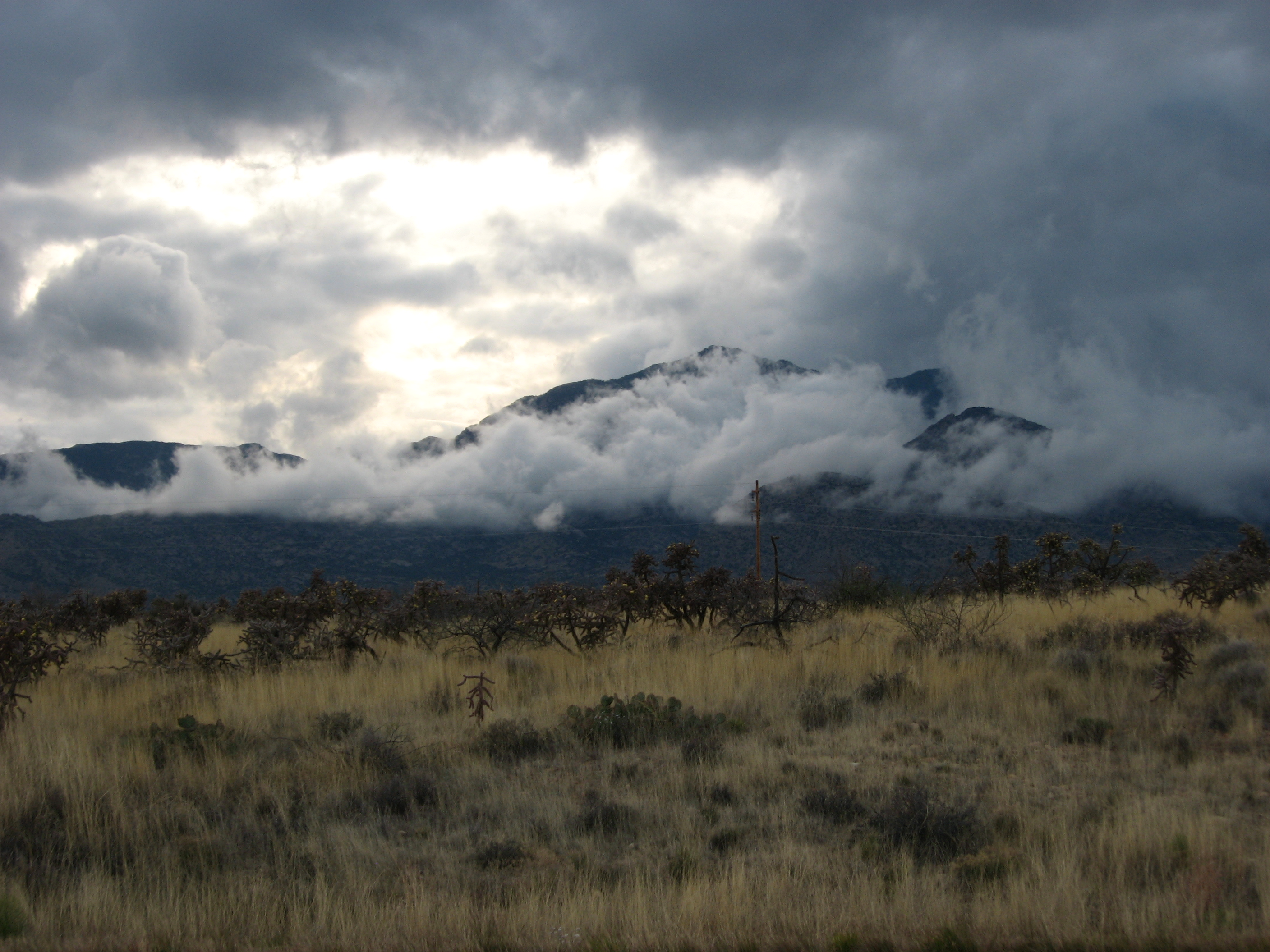
Mount Graham

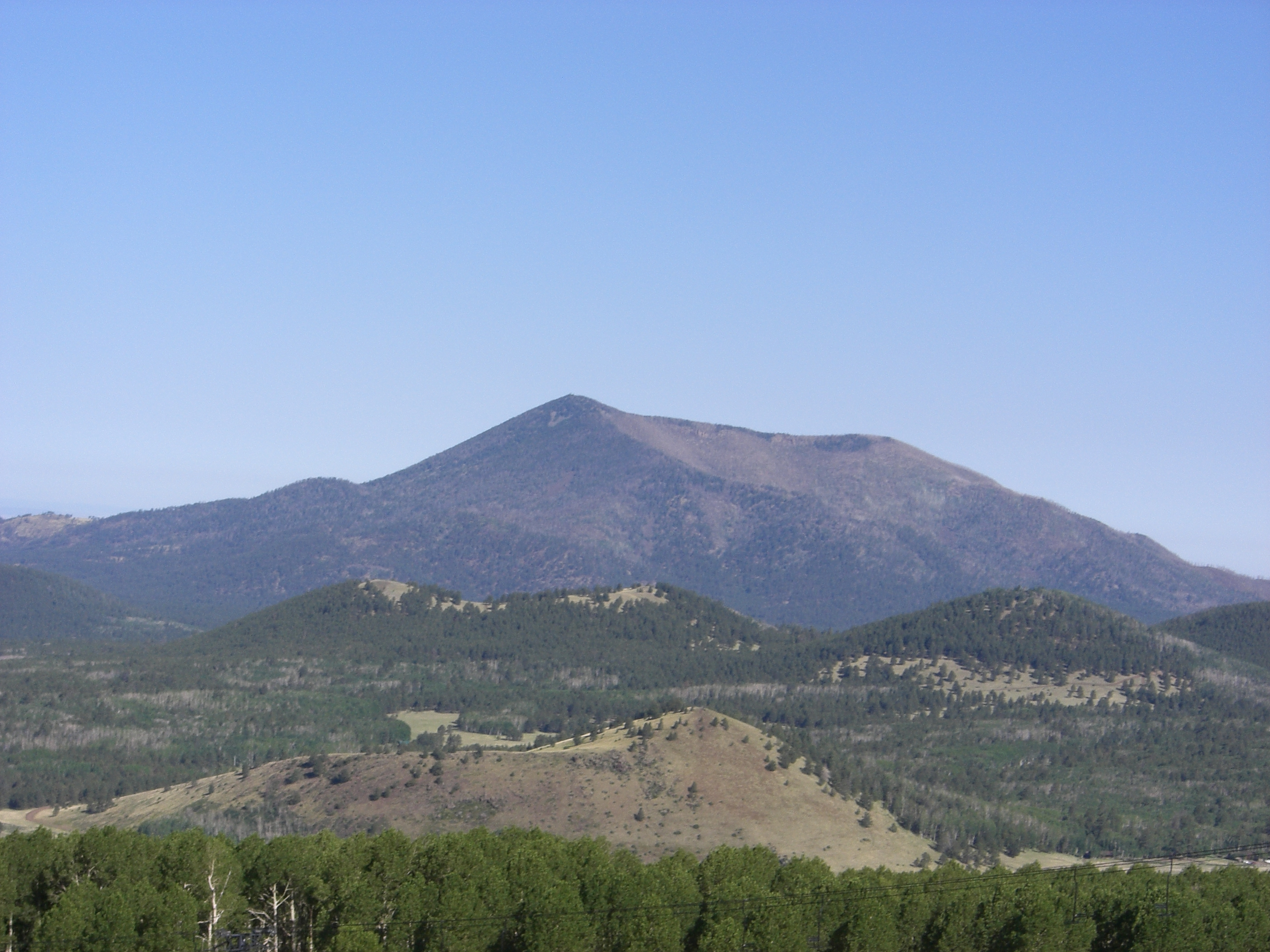
Kendrick Peak

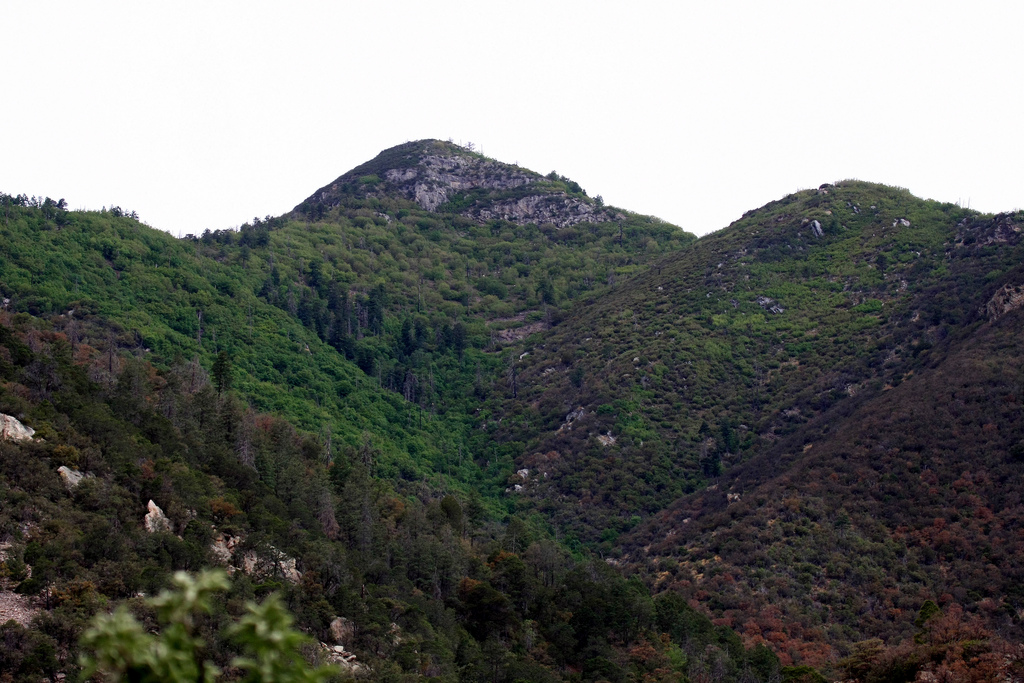
Miller Peak

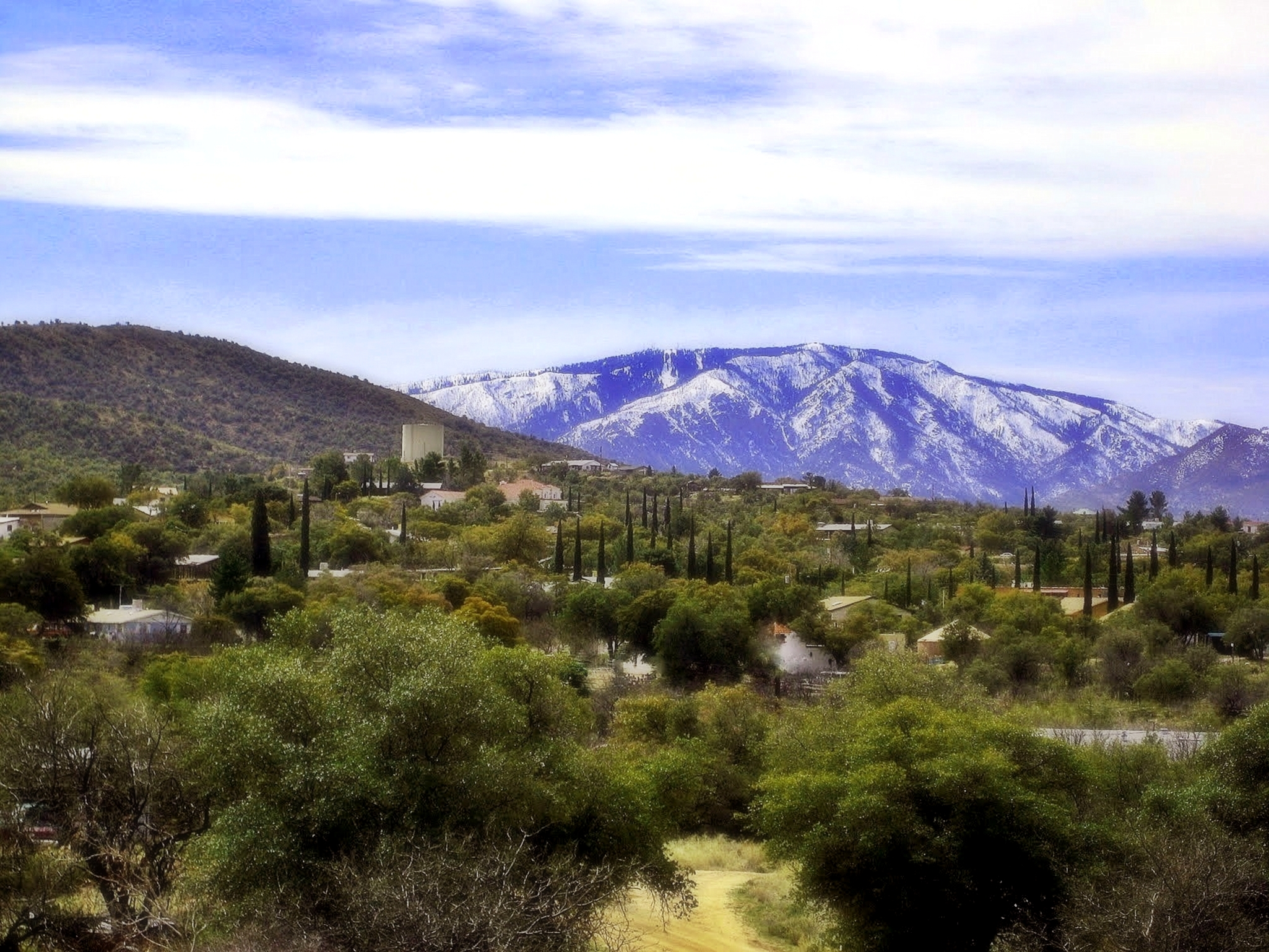
Mount Lemmon

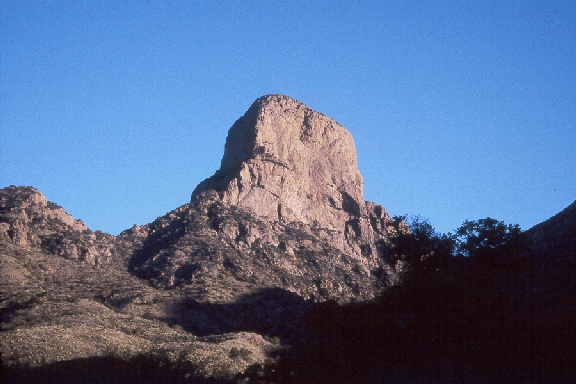
Baboquivari Peak

== See also ==
- List of mountain peaks of North America
  - List of mountain peaks of Greenland
  - List of mountain peaks of Canada
  - List of mountain peaks of the Rocky Mountains
  - List of mountain peaks of the United States
    - List of mountain peaks of Alaska
    - List of mountain peaks of Arizona
      - List of mountains of Arizona
        - List of mountains and hills of Arizona by height
      - List of mountain ranges of Arizona
    - List of mountain peaks of California
    - List of mountain peaks of Colorado
    - List of mountain peaks of Hawaiʻi
    - List of mountain peaks of Idaho
    - List of mountain peaks of Montana
    - List of mountain peaks of Nevada
    - List of mountain peaks of New Mexico
    - List of mountain peaks of Oregon
    - List of mountain peaks of Utah
    - List of mountain peaks of Washington (state)
    - List of mountain peaks of Wyoming
  - List of mountain peaks of México
  - List of mountain peaks of Central America
  - List of mountain peaks of the Caribbean
- Arizona
  - Geography of Arizona
    - Category:Mountains of Arizona
      - commons:Category:Mountains of Arizona
- Physical geography
  - Topography
    - Topographic elevation
    - Topographic prominence
    - Topographic isolation
