= Rincon Valley =

Rincon Valley may refer to:

- Rincon Valley, Arizona, a census-designated place
- Rincon Valley (Arizona) a valley in Pima County, Arizona
- Rincon Valley (California) a basin in Sonoma County, California
- Rincon Valley (New Mexico), a valley, in Sierra County and Doña Ana County, New Mexico
