= Little Rincon Mountains =

Landform in southern Arizona

- Location within Arizona

Highest point
- Peak: Forest Hill (peak)
- Elevation: 6,114 ft (1,864 m)
- Coordinates: 32°07′39″N 110°25′54″W

Dimensions
- Length: 15 mi (24 km) SW x NE
- Width: 8 mi (13 km)

Geography
- Country: United States
- State: Arizona
- Regions: San Pedro Valley, Madrean Sky Islands and Sonoran Desert
- Counties: Cochise and Pima
- Cities: Cascabel, AZ and Redington, AZ (Benson, AZ)
- Range coordinates: 32°07′39″N 110°25′54″W
- Borders on: Rincon Mountains and San Pedro River

The Little Rincon Mountains are a small range of mountains, lying to the east of the Rincon Mountains, at Tucson, of eastern Pima County, Arizona. The range is located in northwest Cochise County and is part of the western border of the San Pedro River and Valley, the major valley and river of western Cochise County. The river is northward flowing to meet the Gila River; its headwaters are south of the US-Mexico border in northern Sonora. A small part of the Little Rincon range's southwest lies in Pima County.

== Description ==
The Little Rincon Mountains are a 15 mi long range, that trends southwest to northeast. It is a linear range, about 8 mi wide and is created by a canyon that separates it from the eastern flank of the mostly north–south, central block of the Rincon Mountains. The canyon is named Paige Canyon, and the major peaks of the range lie near its headwaters in the southwest. The peaks from south to north are: San Juan Hill, at 5,269 feet (1,606 m), North Star Peak at 6,041 feet (1,841 m), Forest Hill, at 6,114 feet (1,864 m), Bald Mountain, at 5,324 feet (1,623 m), and Wildhorse Mountain.

The highest point of the range is Forest Hill (peak) at 6,114 feet (1,864 m). located at 32.1276°N 110.4317°W

=== San Pedro Valley ===
In the San Pedro Valley, the Little Rincon's lie directly on the course of the San Pedro River, and force an excursion of the river around the mountain range's southeast, east, and northeast flank. To the north the valley narrows between mountain ranges; to the south, the San Pedro River flows mostly due north from the Mexican border, though trends northwesterly. The San Pedro Valley also widens extensively in some locales associated with perimeter mountain ranges, or low hill regions. Various tributary washes enter this wider valley region. The largest tributary enters from the southwest, the Babocomari River, from north of the Huachuca Mountains and south of the Whetstone's. The Babocomari drains from the Canelo Hills between the northwest Huachuca's and the eastern, high-elevation Santa Rita Mountains.
