= Desert Palms =

Desert Palms may refer to:

- Desert Palms, California
- Desert Palms Park
- Desert Palms Elementary
