= Hualapai Peak =

Mountain in Mohave County, Arizona, U.S.

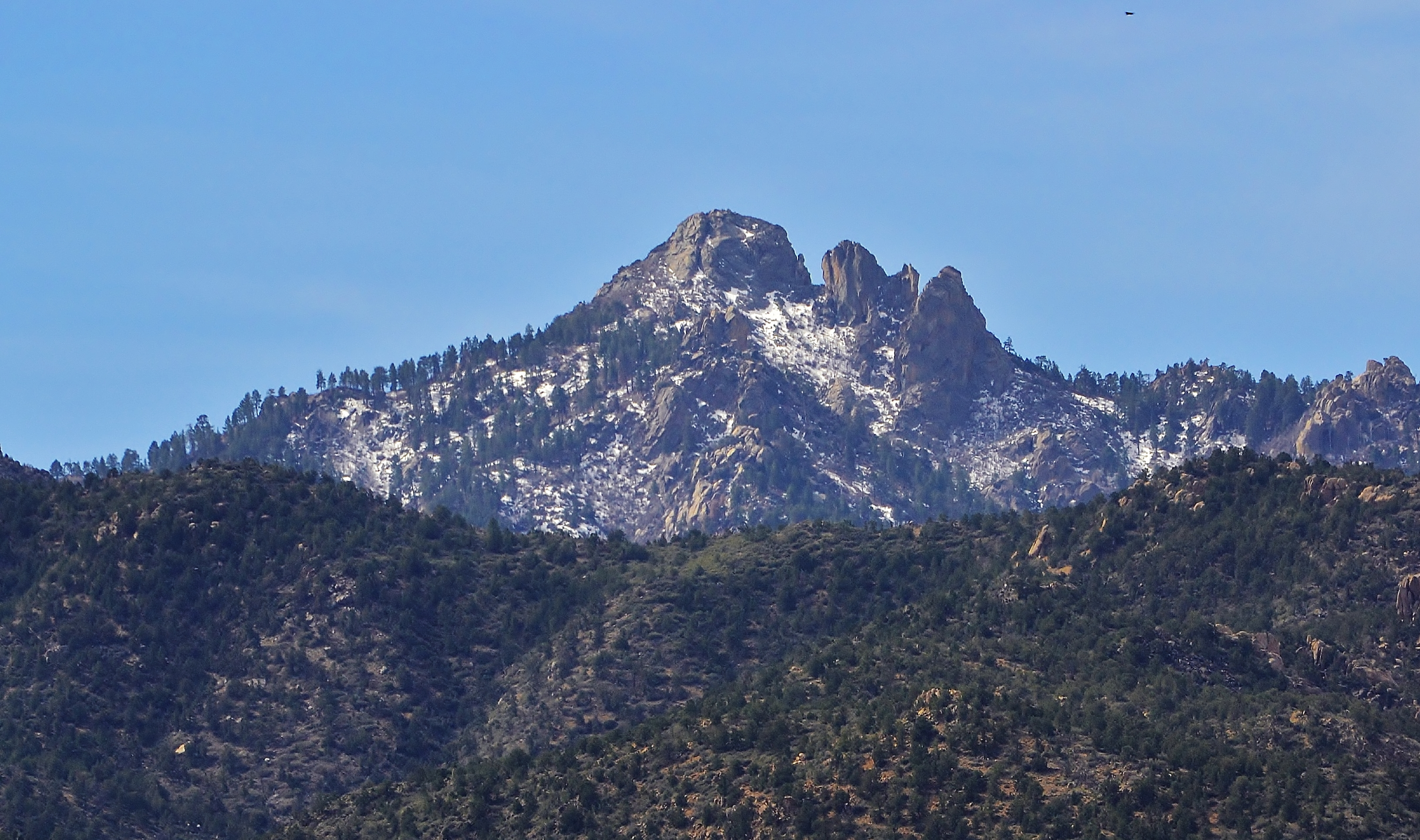

Highest point
- Elevation: 8,417 ft (2,566 m)
- Prominence: 4,439 ft (1,353 m)
- Isolation: 95.22 mi (153.24 km)
- Coordinates: 35°04′30″N 113°54′03″W

Geography
- Location within Arizona
- Location: Mohave County, Arizona, US
- Parent range: Hualapai Mountains

Hualapai Peak is a 8,417-foot (2,566 m) mountain summit in Mohave County, Arizona, and is the highest point of the Hualapai Mountains. It is located about 15 miles (24 km) southeast of Kingman in Hualapai Mountain County Park.

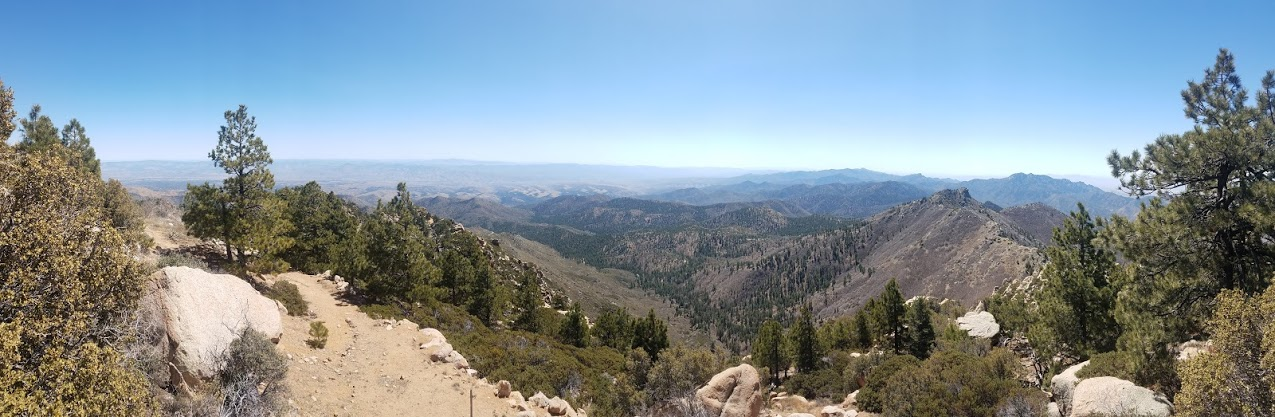
Picture taken of the surrounding landscape from near the summit of Hualapai Peak in Arizona.

The mountain is characterized by huge granite outcroppings and pillars, a result of its volcanic origin. Although trails lead to its base, a moderate scramble and climb is required to reach the summit.

There are also climbing routes along the trail to the peak.

It is named after the Hualapai Native American tribe. Hualapai means "people of the tall pines".

== See also ==
- List of mountain peaks of Arizona
