= Mount Ajo =

Landform in Pima County, Arizona

- Location within Arizona Location within the United States

Highest point
- Elevation: 4,811 ft (1,466 m)
- Prominence: 2,703 ft (824 m)
- Coordinates: 32°1′36″N 112°41′27″W

Geography
- Location: Pima County, Arizona
- Parent range: Ajo Range

Mount Ajo is a mountain located in Pima County, Arizona.

== See also ==
- List of mountain peaks of Arizona
