= Desert Palms Park =

Neighborhood in Tucson, Arizona

Coordinates: 32.2375135°N 110.800158°W

Desert Palms Park (DPP) is a neighborhood in Tucson, Arizona. It is located in the east side of the city, between 8900-9100 east and 1300-1800 north. It is bordered by Speedway Boulevard to the South and Wrightstown Road to the North. The Catalina Mountains can be seen to the north and the Rincon Mountains to the east.

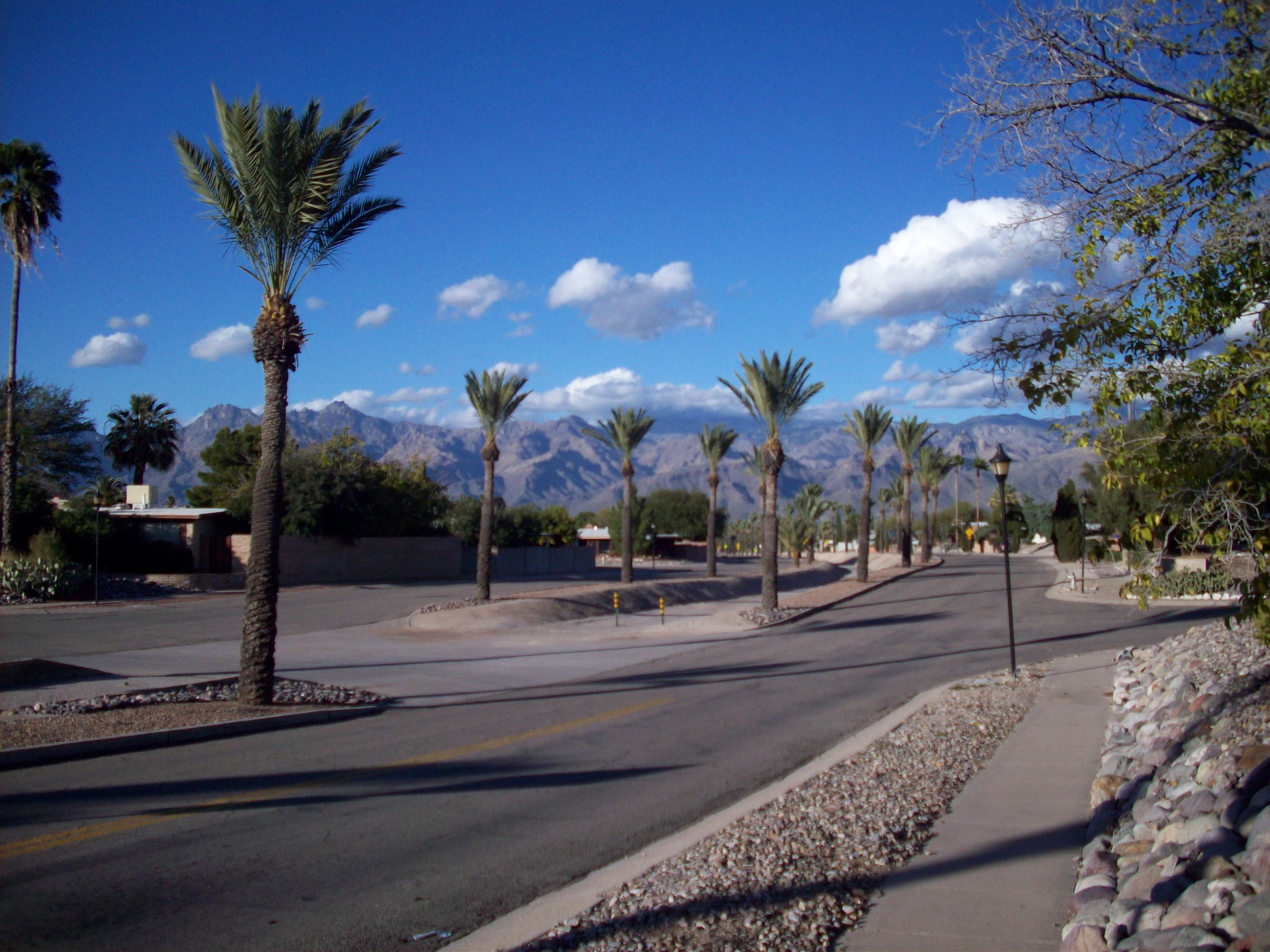
Avenida Ricardo Small crosses Desert Palms Park neighborhood from south to north.

== History ==
A civil engineer named Otto Small, born in Poland in 1910, designed Desert Palms Park in 1959. His purpose was to build quality housing in an enjoyable environment. The first home was completed in 1961. He named several of the streets after many of the places in Colombia, South America where he lived for many years before coming to Tucson. In 1962 and in 1963, Tucson's builders selected Desert Palms Park for the annual Parade of Homes. Sadly, Otto Small died in a car accident in 1964. Gaylen Klein assumed the responsibility of completing the huge project in 1968.

== Features ==
DPP has a symmetrical plan. It is crossed in the center from north to south by a concrete-lined wash or arroyo. Medians on each side are lined with nearly 80 date palms. Along each side of the medians are two-way streets both called Avenida Ricardo Small for Otto's son. Cul-de-sacs and loops are entered from this avenue. Many of these use the Spanish term "calle" instead of "street". There is also a cul-de-sac from Wrightstown Road that is included in the neighborhood. All utilities are underground along city easements behind the homes. All but one home are single level as was common in this SW desert area. There are 183 homes with approximately 750 residents. Back alleys allow for easy access to the utilities, all buried, including power-lines.

All the houses in DPP have a similar price but differently from most planned neighborhood. Each of them has a distinctive design. This variety invites people to walk around its streets to discover all the different features. DPP sits on a gradual downward slope to the Tanque Verde wash. This provides most residents with a view of the Catalina Mountains. The nearest elementary school is within the neighborhood boundaries allowing children to walk to school without crossing a busy street.

The streets of Desert Palms Park were featured in David Leighton's popular series "Streets Smarts" in the Arizona Daily Star on Feb. 5, 2013.

== Desert Palms Parks Association ==
DPPA was founded in 1961 and has eleven volunteer board members elected each year at an annual meeting. This one is the oldest continuously active neighborhood associations in Tucson.

== See also ==
- Neighborhoods
- Tucson, Arizona
