= Mica Mountain =

Landform in Pima County, Arizona

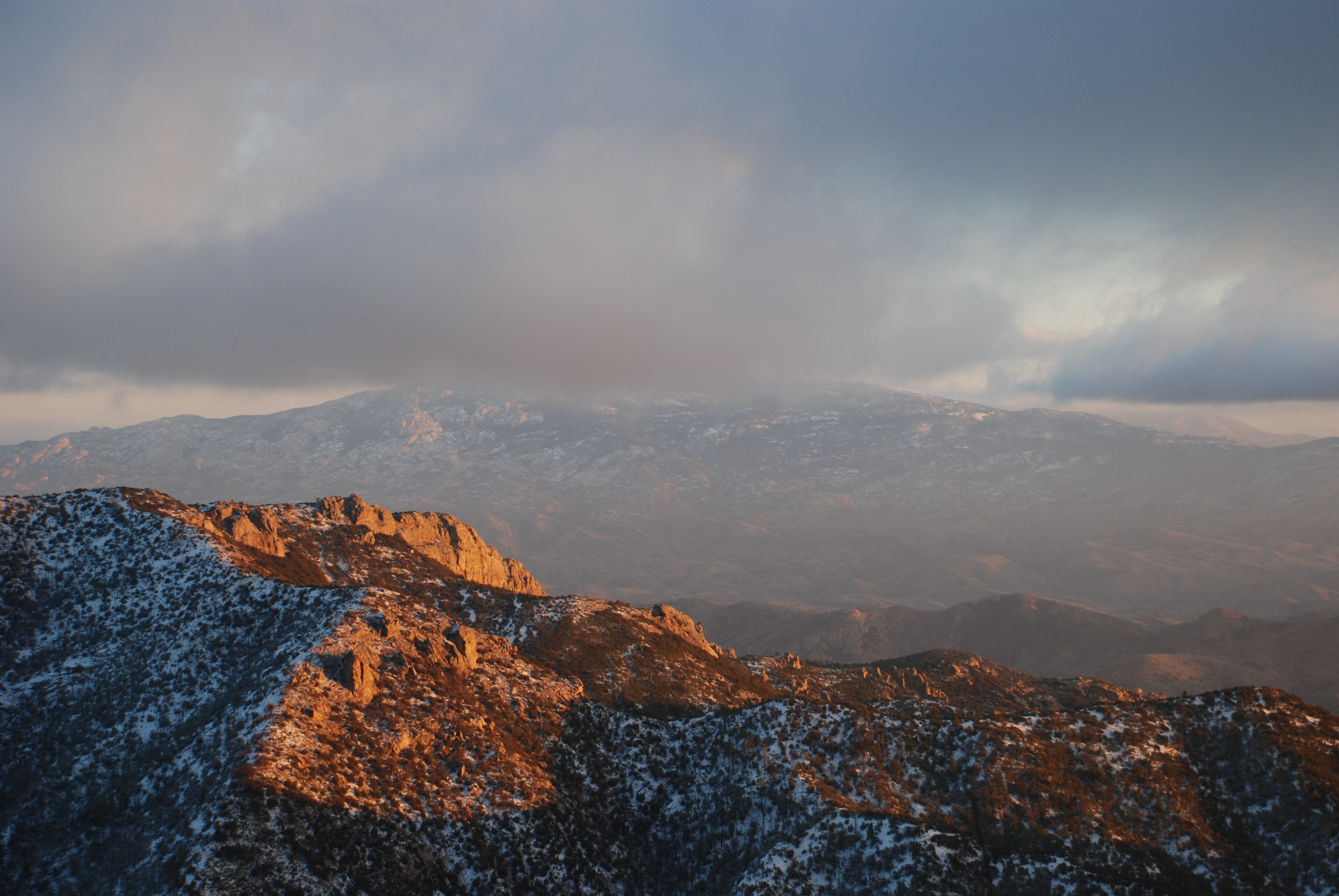
- Mica Mountain view from Windy Point

Highest point
- Elevation: 8,668 ft (2,642 m)
- Prominence: 4,608 ft (1,405 m)
- Isolation: 20.42 mi (32.86 km)
- Coordinates: 32°13′12″N 110°32′36″W

Geography
- Location within Arizona
- Location: Pima County, Arizona, United States
- Parent range: Rincon Mountains

Mica Mountain is an 8,668-foot (2,642 m) peak in the Rincon Mountain District of Saguaro National Park in Pima County, Arizona, about 20 miles (32 km) east of Tucson. It is the highest point of the park and the highest point in the Rincon Mountains.

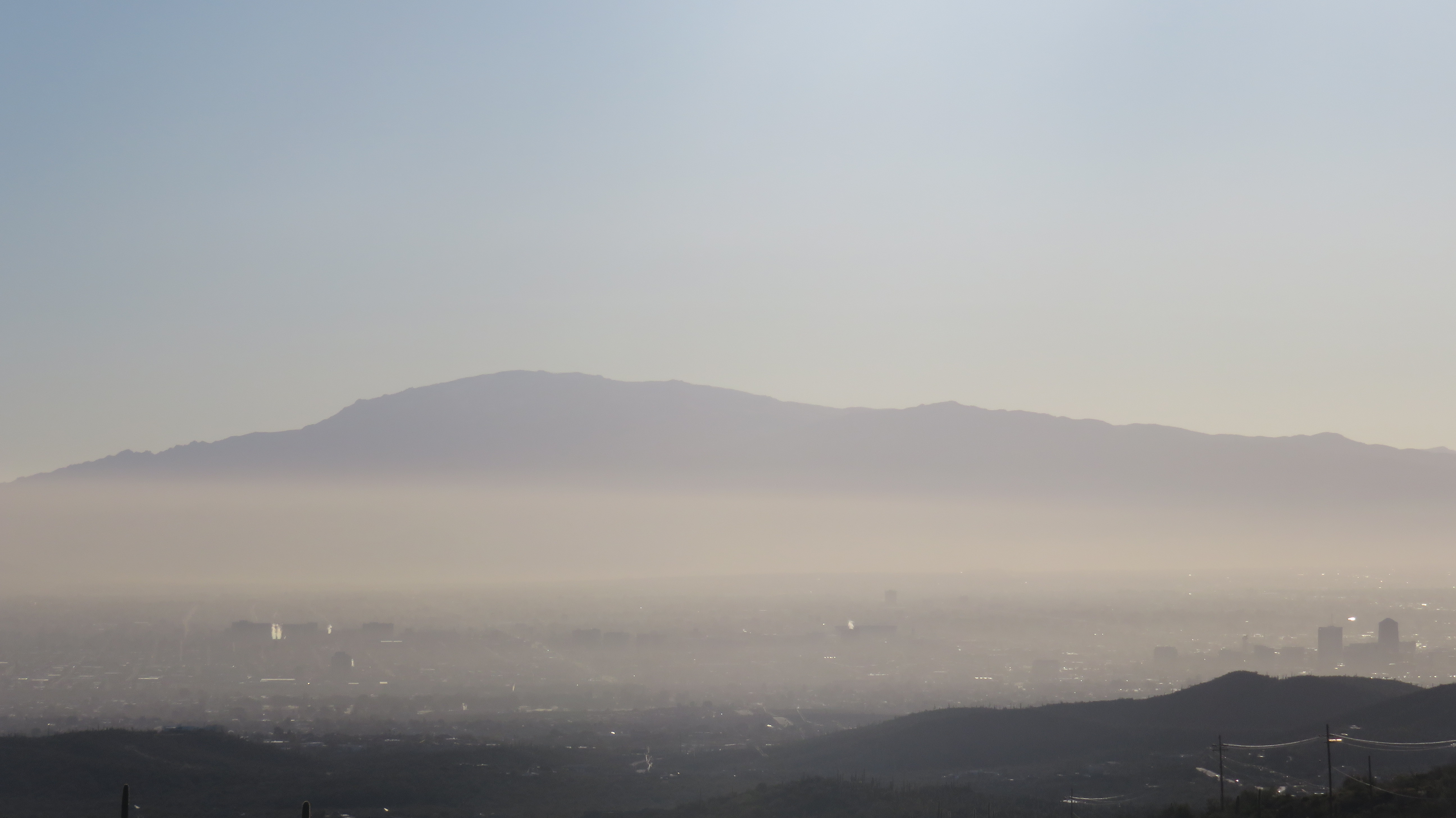
Mica Mountain view from the west, from 36 miles away in the Tucson Mountains. The small sub-peak on the right side of the mountain is Tanque Verde Peak, and Downtown Tucson can be seen in the foreground.

== See also ==
- List of mountain peaks of Arizona
