= San Pedro Valley =

Landform in Cochise County, Arizona

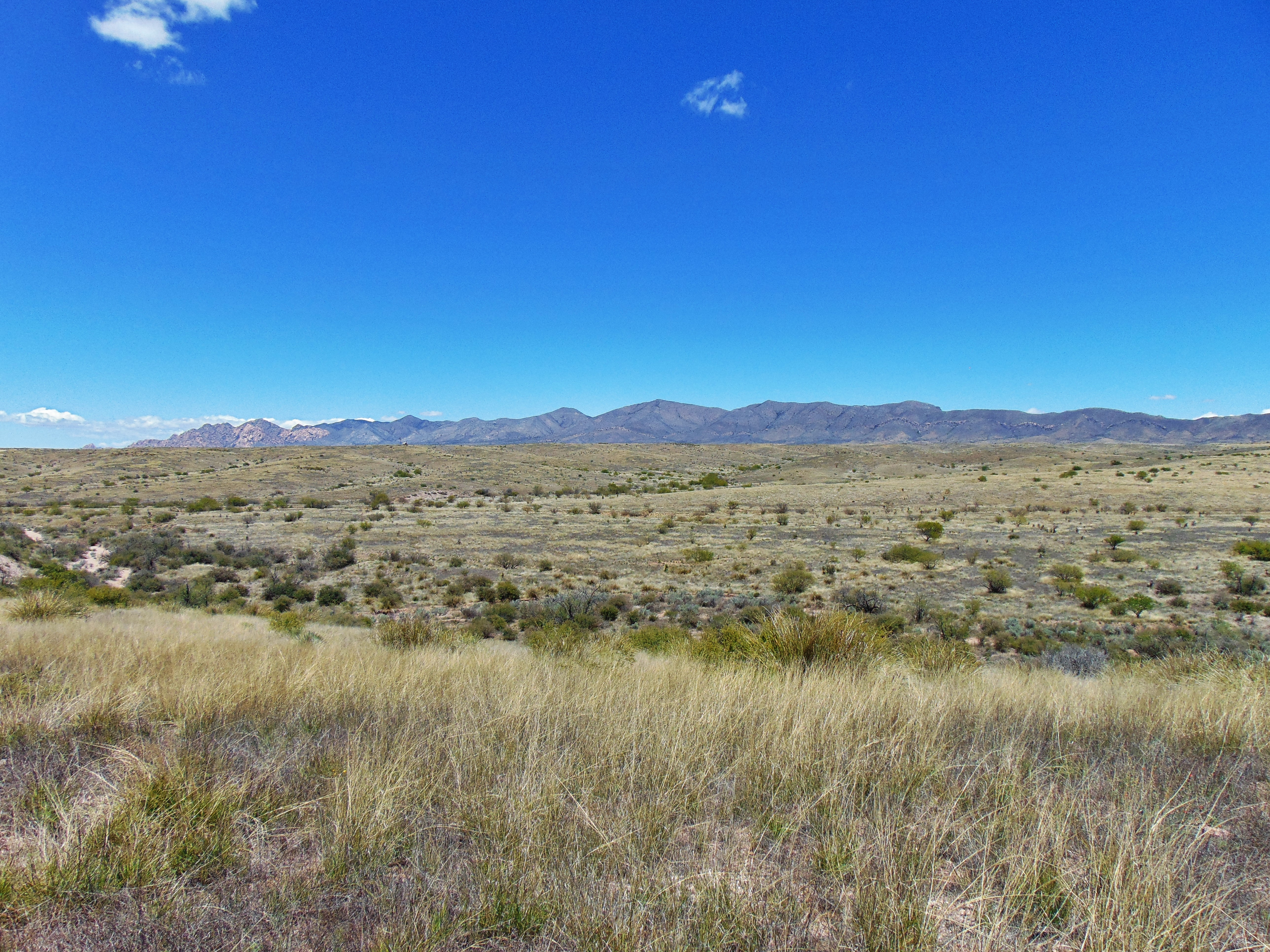
- Prairie in the San Pedro Valley near Tombstone, Arizona. The Dragoon Mountains are in the background.

- Location within Arizona
- Length: 50 mi (80 km)

Geography
- Country: United States, Mexico
- State: Arizona, Sonora
- Communities: Benson; Tombstone; Sierra Vista Southeast, Arizona; Naco, Sonora
- Borders on: List: Rincon; Whetstone; Huachuca Mtns; Little Dragoon; Dragoon; Mule Mtns
- Coordinates: 31°38′9″N 110°10′21″W
- River: San Pedro River
- Interactive map of San Pedro Valley

The San Pedro Valley starts 10 miles (16 km) south of the United States–Mexico border and extends 140 miles (230 km) north through Arizona. The San Pedro River flows from the state of Sonora, Mexico, through Cochise, Pima, Graham, and Pinal Counties to Winkelman, Arizona.

== In popular culture ==
The 2024 movie Horizon: An American Saga – Chapter 1 takes place in the San Pedro Valley.

== See also ==
- San Pedro River (Arizona) Valley
- San Pedro Valley Railroad
- Tres Alamos, Arizona
