= Mount Turnbull (Arizona) =

Landform in Graham County, Arizona

Mount. Turnbull
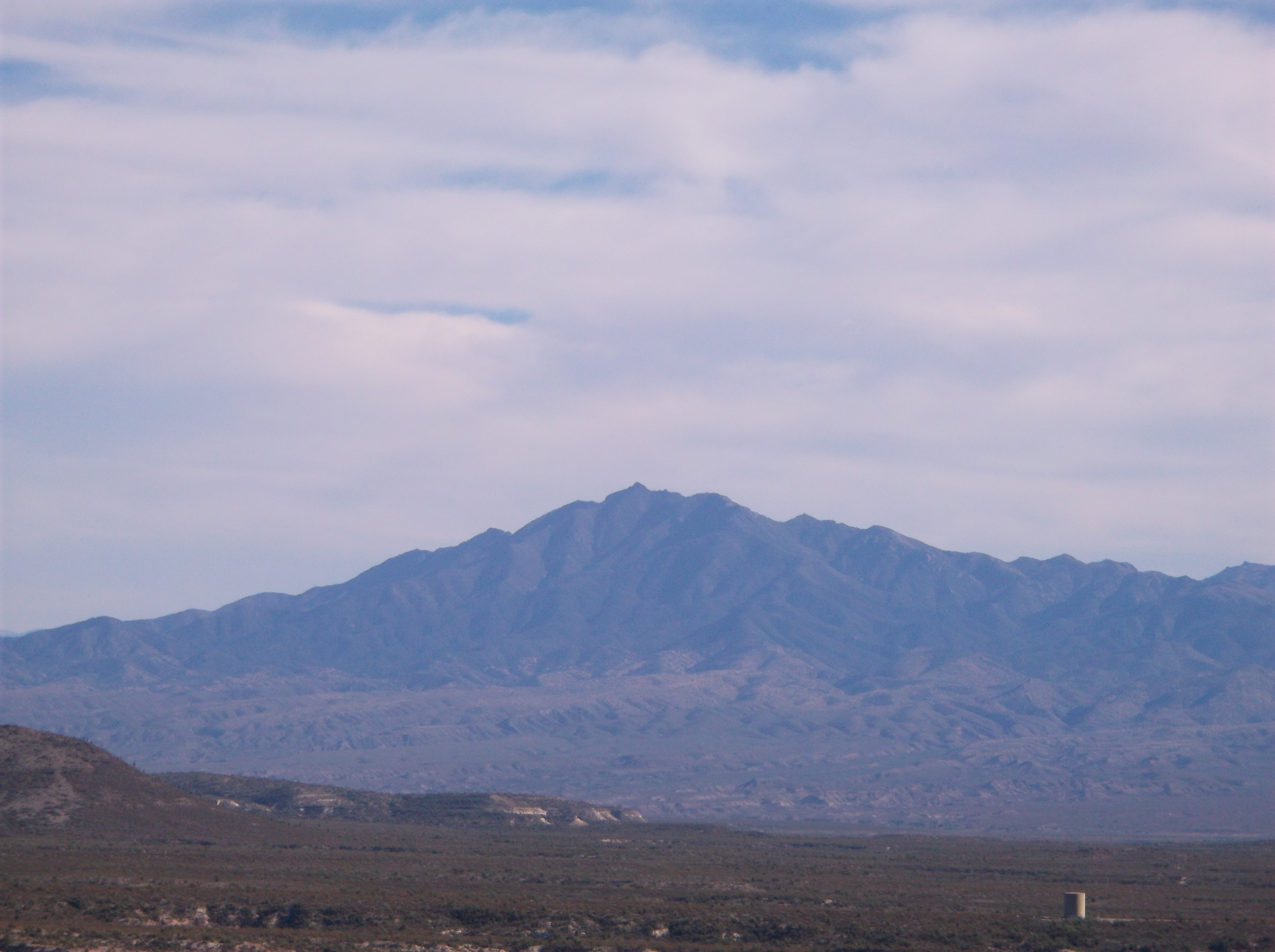

Highest point
- Elevation: 8,284 ft (2,525 m) NAVD 88
- Prominence: 3,562 ft (1,086 m)
- Coordinates: 33°04′26″N 110°15′39″W

Geography
- Location within Arizona
- Location: San Carlos Apache Indian Reservation; Graham County, Arizona, U.S.
- Parent range: Santa Teresa Mountains
- Topo map: USGS Mount Turnbull

Mount Turnbull (Western Apache: Dził Dlaazhe) is the highest point in the Santa Teresa Mountains in western Graham County, Arizona. The summit has an elevation of 8,284 feet (2,525 m) and a prominence of 3,562 feet (1,086 m). It is the highest point in the Santa Teresa Mountains and the San Carlos Apache Indian Reservation. A recreational permit is required for access to reservation land.
