= Roof Butte =

Landform in Apache County, Arizona

- Location within Arizona Location within the United States

Highest point
- Elevation: 9,787 ft (2,983 m) NAVD 88
- Prominence: 3,140 ft (960 m)
- Coordinates: 36°27′41″N 109°05′47″W

Geography
- Location: Navajo Nation, Apache County, Arizona, U.S.
- Parent range: Chuska Mountains
- Topo map: USGS Roof Butte

Climbing
- Easiest route: Indian Route 68

Roof Butte (Navajo: Adáá dikʼá "Roof shaped mountain on the run") is a peak in the Chuska Mountains in Arizona, United States. Roof Butte is the highest peak of the Chuska Mountains which run in a north-northwest direction across the Arizona-New Mexico border. Roof Butte is a visible butte for miles around. The butte has an elevation of 9,787 feet (2,983 m). A staffed-lookout tower is located on Roof Butte. Two funnel shaped explosion volcanic pipes formed the flattish summit of Roof Butte, and a low lava dome caps one nearby peak.
