= Rincon Valley (Arizona) =

Landform in Pima County

Rincon Valley (Arizona) is a valley in Pima County, Arizona that is surrounded on the north, east and south by the Rincon Mountains. Its mouth lies at an elevation of 2,887 feet (880 m), at, near the confluence of Pantano Wash and Rincon Creek. Its head is at an elevation of 3,760 feet (1,150 m), at where Rincon Creek ascends into the Rincon Mountains.
