= Rincon Mountains =

Mountain range in Arizona, United States

- View to north toward Rincon Peak from Mescal Road. Mica Mountain to rear at right.

Highest point
- Peak: Mica Mountain
- Elevation: 8,664 ft (2,641 m)
- Coordinates: 32°13′11″N 110°32′36″W

Dimensions
- Length: 33 mi (53 km) SW x NE
- Width: 28 mi (45 km)

Geography
- Location within Arizona
- Country: United States
- State: Arizona
- Regions: San Pedro Valley; Madrean Sky Islands; Sonoran Desert
- Counties: Cochise; Pima
- Settlement: Tucson
- Range coordinates: 32°10′26″N 110°30′40″W
- Borders on: San Pedro River

The Rincon Mountains (O'odham: Cew Doʼag) are a significant mountain range east of Tucson, Pima County, Arizona, in the United States. The Rincon Mountains are one of five mountain ranges surrounding the Tucson valley. The other ranges include the most prominent, the Santa Catalina Mountains to the north, the Santa Rita Mountains to the south, the Tucson Mountains to the west, and the Tortolita Mountains to the northwest. Redington Pass separates the Rincon Mountains from the Santa Catalina Mountains. The Rincon Mountains are generally less rugged than the Santa Catalina Mountains and Santa Rita Mountains. The Rincon Mountains are also included in the Madrean sky island mountain ranges of southeast Arizona, extreme southwest New Mexico, and northern Sonora Mexico.

Rincón is Spanish for corner, denoting the primary shape of the mountain range. Mica Mountain (8,664 feet), the high-point of the Rincons forms the apex, with Rincon Peak (8,482 feet) forming the southern point, and Tanque Verde Peak (7,049 feet) forming the western point of the corner. The interior of the corner is Rincon Valley (south and west of Mica Mountain), primarily former ranchland currently being converted to tract housing. Colossal Cave county park, a limestone cave and popular destination, is located on the east end of the Rincon Valley, north of the community of Vail.

East of the Rincons are the Little Rincon Mountains. Between these two ranges is Happy Valley, a popular destination for locals for camping, hunting, and off-roading. Farther east is the San Pedro River of the San Pedro Valley, a holocene paleontology region.

South of the Rincon Mountains, beyond Rincon Valley is the Cienega Creek and Interstate 10.

Most of the Rincon Mountains are within Saguaro National Park, or in the Rincon Mountain Wilderness, 32°14′50″N 110°28′02″W, of the Coronado National Forest.

== Trails ==
The majority of the range is off-limits to motorized & bicycle travel. The mountains can be accessed on foot or horseback by the following routes:

- East Side
  - Turkey Creek Trail
  - Miller Creek Trail
- North Side
  - Italian Ranch (Italian Springs) Trail
  - Espiritu Creek Trail (inaccessible - dense overgrowth)
- West Side
  - Douglas Springs Trail
  - Tanque Verde Ridge Trail
- South Side
  - Madrona/Manning Camp Trail (inaccessible - trailhead located on private land)

The Arizona Trail passes through the Rincons, entering from the north by the Italian Spring trail, and southwest by the Quilter Trail

== See also ==
- List of mountain ranges of Pima County, Arizona
- List of mountain ranges of Arizona
- List of Arizona Wilderness Areas
