= Arrowhead Mountain =

Arrowhead Mountain may refer to:

- Arrowhead Mountain (British Columbia) in Canada
- Arrowhead Mountain (Nunavut) in Canada
- Arrowhead Mountain (Arizona) in the United States
- Arrowhead Mountain (California) in the United States
- Arrowhead Mountain (Colorado) in the United States
- Arrowhead Mountain (Beaverhead County, Montana) in the United States
- Arrowhead Mountain (Flathead County, Montana) in the United States
- Arrowhead Mountain (Vermont) in the United States
- Arrowhead Mountain (Washington) in the United States
