= List of mountains and hills of Arizona by height =

The following is a list of the mountains and hills of Arizona, ordered by height.

Entries in bold indicate the peak is the highest point in its respective county.

Entries with a † indicate the peak has a low topographic prominence and may be considered a subpeak to a higher nearby summit.

== Mountains over 12000 feet ==
Mountain	County	Height
**Humphreys Peak**	Coconino	12,633 ft (3850 m)
Agassiz Peak	Coconino	12,356 ft (3766 m)

== Mountains over 11000 feet ==
Mountain	County	Height
Fremont Peak	Coconino	11,969 ft (3648 m)
Aubineau Peak	Coconino	11,838 ft (3608 m)
Rees Peak	Coconino	11,474 ft (3497 m)
Doyle Peak	Coconino	11,460 ft (3493 m)
**Mount Baldy**	Apache	11,420 ft (3481 m)

== Mountains over 10000 feet ==
Mountain	County	Height
Escudilla Mountain	Apache	10,912 ft (3325 m)
**Mount Graham**	Graham	10,720 ft (3267 m)
Hawk Peak	Graham	10,627 ft (3239 m)
Kendrick Peak	Coconino	10,418 ft (3175 m)
Plain View Peak	Graham	10,370 ft (3160 m)
Heliograph Peak	Graham	10,022 ft (3055 m)

== Mountains over 9000 feet ==
Mountain	County	Height
Roof Butte	Apache	9800 ft (2987 m)
**Chiricahua Peak**	Cochise	9796 ft (2985 m)
Miller Peak	Cochise	9466 ft (2885 m)
**Mount Wrightson**	Santa Cruz	9453 ft (2881 m)
**(Liam Peak)**	Greenlee	9441 ft (2878 m)
Pastora Peak	Apache	9407 ft (2867 m)
Sitgreaves Mountain	Coconino	9388 ft (2861 m)
Merrill Peak	Graham	9288 ft (2831 m)
Bill Williams Mountain	Coconino	9264 ft (2824 m)
Kaibab Plateau High Point	Coconino	9176 ft (2797 m)
**Mount Lemmon**	Pima	9157 ft (2791 m)

== Mountains over 8000 feet ==
Mountain	County	Height
O'Leary Peak	Coconino	8919 ft (2719 m)
Pat Scott Peak†	Cochise	8800 ft (2683 m)
Rose Peak	Greenlee	8786 ft (2678 m)
Ladybug Peak	Graham	8780 ft (2676 m)
Ramsey Peak†	Cochise	8730 ft (2662 m)
Mica Mountain	Pima	8664 ft (2641 m)
Mount Hopkins†	Santa Cruz	8585 ft (2616 m)
Rincon Peak	Pima	8482 ft (2585 m)
Hualapai Peak	Mohave	8417 ft (2566 m)
Mount Turnbull	Graham	8282 ft (2524 m)
Maness Peak	Greenlee	8262 ft (2518 m)
**Black Mesa**	Navajo	8168 ft (2490 m)
Sunset Crater	Coconino	8042 ft (2451 m)
Mount Trumbull	Mohave	8038 ft (2450 m)
Mount Bangs	Mohave	8016 ft (2443 m)

== Mountains over 7000 feet ==
Mountain	County	Height
Mount Union	Yavapai	7,979 ft (2,432 m)
Promontory Butte	Gila	7,940 ft (2,420 m)
Mazatzal Peak	Gila	7,903 ft (2,409 m)
Mount Davis	Yavapai	7,897 ft (2,407 m)
Mount Logan	Mohave	7,886 ft (2,404 m)
Woodchute Mountain	Yavapai	7,860 ft (2,396 m)
Pinal Peak	Gila	7,848 ft (2,392 m)
Willow Mountain	Greenlee	7,817 ft (2,383 m)
Mingus Mountain	Yavapai	7,815 ft (2,382 m)
Mount Tritle	Yavapai	7,793 ft (2,375 m)
Aztec Peak	Gila	7,748 ft (2,362 m)
Baboquivari Peak	Pima	7,730 ft (2,356 m)
Apache Peak	Cochise	7,711 ft (2,350 m)
Bassett Peak	Graham	7,663 ft (2,336 m)
Browns Peak	Maricopa	7,657 ft (2,334 m)
Reiley Peak	Cochise	7,631 ft (2,326 m)
Granite Mountain	Yavapai	7,626 ft (2,324 m)
Mount Glenn	Cochise	7,512 ft (2,290 m)
Mohon Peak	Yavapai	7,502 ft (2,287 m)
Mount Ballard	Cochise	7,500 ft (2,286 m)
Granite Peak	Cochise	7,420 ft (2,262 m)
Fissure Peak	Cochise	7,360 ft (2,243 m)
Red Butte	Coconino	7,324 ft (2,232 m)
Bryce Mountain	Graham	7,302 ft (2,226 m)
Rice Peak	Pinal	7,280 ft (2,219 m)
Hyde Creek Mountain†	Yavapai	7,270 ft (2,216 m)
Mount Kimball	Pima	7,254 ft (2,211 m)
Mount Washington	Santa Cruz	7,221 ft (2,201 m)
Swisshelm Mountain	Cochise	7,185 ft (2,190 m)
Mount Tipton	Mohave	7,148 ft (2,179 m)
Mount Ord	Maricopa/Gila	7,128 ft (2,173 m)
Wilson Mountain	Coconino	7,122 ft (2,171 m)
Zihi-Dush-Jhini Peak (Big Mountain)	Navajo	7,107 ft (2,166 m)
Mount Dellenbaugh	Mohave	7,072 ft (2,156 m)
Williams Peak	Yavapai	7,058 ft (2,151 m)
Tanque Verde Peak	Pima	7,049 ft (2,149 m)

== Mountains over 6000 feet ==
Mountain	County	Height
Mt Elliot	Yavapai	6980 ft (2128 m)
Kitt Peak	Pima	6886 ft (2099 m)
Grand Wash Cliffs	Mohave	6769 ft (2063 m)
Mae West Peaks	Cochise	6732 ft (2052 m)
Weaver Peak	Yavapai	6574 ft (2004 m)
Guthrie Peak	Greenlee	6573 ft (2003 m)
EL Capitan Mountain	Gila	6568 ft (2002 m)
Coyote Mountain Benchmark	Pima	6529 ft (1990 m)
Atascosa Peak	Santa Cruz	6422 ft (1957 m)
College Peaks	Cochise	6388 ft (1947 m)
Peacock Peak	Mohave	6293 ft (1918 m)
Mound Mountain	Maricopa	6266 ft (1910 m)
Keystone Peak	Pima	6188 ft (1886 m)
Forest Hill	Cochise	6114 ft (1864 m)
San Cayetano Peak	Santa Cruz	6007 ft (1831 m)

== Mountains over 5000 feet ==
Mountain	County	Height
Mistake Peak	Gila	5,928 ft (1,807 m)
Harquahala Mountain	La Paz	5,681 ft (1,732 m)
Empire Mountains	Pima	5,588 ft (1,703 m)
Mount Perkins (Arizona)	Mohave	5,459 ft (1,664 m)
Pusch Peak†	Pima	5,361 ft (1,634 m)
Colorado Benchmark	Pima	5,319 ft (1,621 m)
Smith Peak	Yavapai	5,242 ft (1,598 m)
Mount Nutt	Mohave	5,216 ft (1,590 m)
Crossman Peak	Mohave	5,103 ft (1,555 m)
Scott Mountain	Pinal	5,096 ft (1,553 m)
Superstition Mountain	Pinal	5,059 ft (1,542 m)

== Mountains over 4000 feet ==
Mountain	County	Height
**Signal Peak**	Yuma	4882 ft (1488 m)
The Flatiron	Pinal	4861 ft (1481 m)
Salt River Peak	Gila	4856 ft (1480 m)
Mount Ajo	Pima	4811 ft (1466 m)
Arrastra Mountain	Mohave	4805 ft (1465 m)
Mount Devine	Pima	4783 ft (1458 m)
Black Cross Butte	Pinal	4774 ft (1455 m)
Wasson Peak	Pima	4686 ft (1428 m)
Harcuvar Peak	La Paz	4618 ft (1408 m)
Skull Mesa	Maricopa	4595 ft (1401 m)
Gu Achi Peak	Pima	4556 ft (1389 m)
Weavers Needle†	Pinal	4553 ft (1388 m)
Antelope Peak	Pinal	4547 ft (1386 m)
Sierra Estrella High Point	Maricopa	4512 ft (1375 m)
Newman Peak	Pinal	4508 ft (1374 m)
Picketpost Mountain	Pinal	4375 ft (1336 m)
Tres Alamos	Yavapai	4296 ft (1309 m)
Golden Gate Mountain†	Pima	4288 ft (1307 m)
Silver Bell Peak	Pima	4261 ft (1299 m)
Malapais Mountain	Pinal	4206 ft (1281 m)
Fremont Peak	Pinal	4180 ft (1274 m)
Bluff Spring Mountain	Pinal	4152 ft (1265 m)
East End	Maricopa	4057 ft (1236 m)
Maricopa Peak	Maricopa	4048 ft (1234 m)
Martina Mountain	Pima	4042 ft (1232 m)
McDowell Peak	Maricopa	4034 ft (1229 m)

== Mountains over 3000 feet ==
Mountain	County	Height
Cyclone Hill	Graham	3993 ft (1217 m)
Huerfano Butte	Pima	3992 ft (1217 m)
Salome Peak	La Paz	3991 ft (1216 m)
Brens (Tucson)	Pima	3990 ft (1216 m)
Thompson Peak†	Maricopa	3982 ft (1213 m)
Salt Spring Mountain	Mohave	3973 ft (1210 m)
Lime Mountain	Maricopa	3973 ft (1210 m)
Black Mountain (Gila County)	Gila	3963 ft (1208 m)
Coyote Peak	Pinal	3963 ft (1208 m)
Peak 3959	Pinal	3959 ft (1206 m)
Perry Mesa	Yavapai	3944 ft (1202 m)
Chuar Lava Hill	Coconino	3930 ft (1197 m)
Elephant Mountain (Maricopa)	Maricopa	3926 ft (1196 m)
Tom's Thumb	Maricopa	3925 ft (1196 m)
Cramm Mountain	Maricopa	3921 ft (1195 m)
Drinkwater Peak	Maricopa	3914 ft (1192 m)
Fish Creek Peak	Maricopa	3910 ft (1191 m)
Ragged Top	Pima	3907 ft (1190 m)
Sand Tank Peak	Maricopa	3881 ft (1183 m)
Canyon Ridge	Mohave	3871 ft (1179 m)
Chains Mountain	Coconino	3868 ft (1178 m)
Cerro Pelon (Arizona)	Pima	3865 ft (1178 m)
Sugarloaf Mountain	Maricopa	3862 ft (1177 m)
Cat Mountain†	Pima	3852 ft (1174 m)
Peak 3845	Pinal	3845 ft (1171 m)
Javelina Mountain	Maricopa	3842 ft (1171 m)
Waterman Peak	Pima	3830 ft (1167 m)
Peak 3826	Pinal	3826 ft (1166 m)
Spaghetti Peak	Yuma	3820 ft (1164 m)
Peak 3805	Pinal	3805 ft (1159 m)
Barnhardt Mesa	Gila	3802 ft (1158 m)
Castle Dome	Yuma	3788 ft (1154 m)
Glass Dome	Maricopa	3780 ft (1152 m)
Bland Hill	Yavapai	3773 ft (1150 m)
Arrowhead Mountain (Arizona)	Maricopa	3767 ft (1146 m)
Arch Mountain Highpoint	Mohave	3763 ft (1143 m)
Sears Kay	Maricopa	3763 ft (1143 m)
Peters Mesa	Pinal	3750 ft (1143 m)
Gardener's Dome	Maricopa	3740 ft (1139 m)
Waterman Peak (Arizona)	Pima	3737 ft (1136 m)
Fortification Hill	Mohave	3719 ft (1134 m)
Indian Butte	Maricopa	3717 ft (1132 m)
Black Mountain	Pima	3700 ft (1128 m)
CP Butte	Yavapai	3681 ft (1121 m)
Scylla Butte	Coconino	3668 ft (1118 m)
Vulture Peak	Maricopa	3663 ft (1116 m)
Goat Mountain (Maricopa)	Maricopa	3658 ft (1111 m)
SB Mountain	Maricopa	3648 ft (1111 m)
Miners Needle	Pinal	3648 ft (1111 m)
Buzzard Roost	Pinal	3645 ft (1110 m)
Black Mountain	Maricopa	3642 ft (1110 m)
Polaris Mountain	Yuma	3624 ft (1104 m)
Black Mesa (Plomosa Mountains)	La Paz	3612 ft (1101 m)
Sharp Peak (Arizona)	Pima	3607 ft (1099 m)
Golden Mine Peak	Mohave	3580 ft (1091 m)
Brownell Peak	Pima	3576 ft (1090 m)
Black Benchmark	Mohave	3563 ft (1086 m)
Safford Peak	Pima	3563 ft (1086 m)
Battle Axe Butte	Pinal	3531 ft (1076 m)
Byous Butte	Maricopa	3530 ft (1075 m)
Squaw Creek Mesa	Yavapai	3527 ft (1075 m)
Granite Mountain (McDowell Sonoran Preserve)	Maricopa	3526 ft (1075 m)
Peak 3521	Maricopa	3521 ft (1073 m)
Brushy Mountain	Maricopa	3517 ft (1071 m)
Miners Summit	Pinal	3516 ft (1071 m)
Diamond Peak (Arizona)	Mohave	3512 ft (1070 m)
Tangle Peak	Yavapai	3510 ft (1069 m)
Peak 3509	Maricopa	3509 ft (1069 m)
Big Horn Peak	Maricopa	3480 ft (1061 m)
Geronimo Head	Pinal	3479 ft (1060 m)
Troon Mountain	Maricopa	3478 ft (1060 m)
Peak 3465 (Walkin' Jim Peak)	Maricopa	3465 ft (1056 m)
Vineyard Mountain	Gila	3458 ft (1053 m)
Pecks Lake Ridge	Yavapai	3440 ft (1048 m)
Panther Peak†	Pima	3435 ft (1047 m)
Boundary Cone	Mohave	3430 ft (1045 m)
Cholla Mountain	Maricopa	3406 ft (1038 m)
Black Mountain (Maricopa County, Arizona)	Maricopa	3398 ft (1036 m)
Dome Mountain (Maricopa)†	Maricopa	3381 ft (1031 m)
Bobcat Ridge	Pima	3380 ft (1030 m)
Arch Mountain	Mohave	3376 ft (1029 m)
Tillotson Peak	Pima	3374 ft (1028 m)
Diablo Mountains High Point	Pima	3372 ft (1027 m)
Picacho Peak	Pinal	3370 ft (1027 m)
Black Top Mesa	Pinal	3354 ft (1022 m)
Lone Mountain (Cave Creek)	Maricopa	3353 ft (1022 m)
Black Cross Butte	Maricopa	3351 ft (1021 m)
Indian Fortress	Maricopa	3342 ft (1018 m)
Little Cat Mountain	Pima	3330 ft (1015 m)
Panorama Peak	Maricopa	3325 ft (1013 m)
Cunningham Mountain	La Paz	3316 ft (1011 m)
Pass Mountain North (Usery Park)	Maricopa	3312 ft (1009 m)
Prieta Peak	Pinal	3309 ft (1009 m)
Madril Peak	Mohave	3308 ft (1008 m)
Black Mountain	Pinal	3306 ft (1008 m)
Thumb Peak	Yuma/La Paz	3304 ft (1007 m)
Eagletail Peak (North Feather)	Maricopa	3300 ft (1006 m)
Clifty Benchmark	Yuma/La Paz	3273 ft (997 m)
Sven Tower III	Maricopa	3273 ft (997 m)
Governors Peak	Maricopa	3260 ft (993 m)
Slant Mountain (aka Brown's Mountain)	Maricopa	3253 ft (992 m)
Twin Hills (Tucson)	Pima	3248 ft (990 m)
Kofa Butte	Yuma/La Paz	3247 ft (989 m)
Saint Clair Mountain	Maricopa	3219 ft (981 m)
Apache Peak	Maricopa	3219 ft (981 m)
Sven Tower II	Maricopa	3217 ft (980 m)
Sven Tower I	Maricopa	3212 ft (979 m)
Pass Mountain Middle Peak (Usery Park)	Maricopa	3205 ft (976 m)
Sugarloaf Mountain (Mohave)	Mohave	3205 ft (976 m)
Kino Peak	Pima	3197 ft (974 m)
Temptation Peak	Maricopa	3195 ft (973 m)
Sophie's Flat Peak	Yavapai	3191 ft (972 m)
Red Top (Yavapai)	Yavapai	3190 ft (972 m)
Coronado Mesa	Maricopa	3190 ft (972 m)
Peak 3179	Pinal	3179 ft (968 m)
Pikes Peak (Maricopa)	Maricopa	3177 ft (968 m)
Daisy Mountain	Maricopa	3176 ft (968 m)
Woolsey Peak	Maricopa	3171 ft (967 m)
Pinnacle Peak (Arizona)	Maricopa	3171 ft (967 m)
Razorback Ridge	Pinal	3161 ft (963 m)
Sheep Mountain	Yuma	3156 ft (962 m)
Pinkley Peak	Pima	3146 ft (959 m)
Hardy Mountain	Mohave	3143 ft (957 m)
Pass Mountain South (Usery Park)	Maricopa	3127 ft (953 m)
Antelope Peak (Pinal County)	Pinal	3119 ft (951 m)
Grapevine Mesa	Mohave	3110 ft (947 m)
Tumamoc Hill	Pima	3108 ft (947 m)
The Hand	Pinal	3100 ft (944 m)
Brown Mountain	Pima	3100 ft (944 m)
Black Mesa	Pinal	3097 ft (944 m)
Red Hills	Pima	3091 ft (942 m)
Apache Peak	Pima	3076 ft (938 m)
Little Table Top	Pinal	3074 ft (936 m)
Sunrise Peak (Maricopa)	Maricopa	3063 ft (933 m)
Cone Mountain	Maricopa	3061 ft (933 m)
Yellow Peak	Pinal	3061 ft (933 m)
The Pickle	Pinal	3060 ft (932 m)
Saddle Mountain (Maricopa)	Maricopa	3037 ft (926 m)
Owl Head Buttes	Pima	3015 ft (919 m)
Black Mountain†	Pima	3012 ft (918 m)

== Mountains over 2000 feet ==
Mountain	County	Height
Usery Mountain (Usery Benchmark)	Maricopa	2,972 ft (905 m)
Stewart Mountain	Maricopa	2,968 ft (904 m)
Aubrey Peak	Mohave	2,953 ft (900 m)
Fools Peak	Mohave	2,939 ft (896 m)
Usery Mountain East	Maricopa	2,933 ft (893 m)
Artillery Peak	Mohave	2,917 ft (889 m)
Palomino Mountain	Pinal	2907 ft (886 m)
Sentinel Peak†	Pima	2897 ft (883 m)
Turk's Head	Pinal	2,822 ft (860 m)
Mount McDowell	Maricopa	2822 ft (860 m)
Battleship Mountain	Pinal	2,797 ft (852 m)
Hackberry Mesa	Pinal	2,793 ft (851 m)
Miller Peak	Mohave	2,793 ft (851 m)
Lone Mountain (Usery Park)	Maricopa	2,787 ft (849 m)
Usery Mountain South	Maricopa	2,786 ft (849 m)
Old Turk's Head	Pinal	2,777 ft (846 m)
Mohawk Peak	Yuma	2765 ft (843 m)
Sacaton Peak	Pinal	2755 ft (840 m)
Camelback Mountain	Maricopa	2704 ft (824 m)
South Mountains (Mount Suppoa)	Maricopa	2690 ft (820 m)
Ibex Peak (Arizona)	La Paz	2687 ft (819 m)
Piestewa Peak	Maricopa	2610 ft (795 m)
Maricopa Peak	Maricopa	2557 ft (779 m)
Goat Hill	Maricopa	2528 ft (770 m)
Dixie Peak	Maricopa	2429 ft (740 m)
Union Peak	Maricopa	2383 ft (726 m)
Dinosaur Mountain	Pinal	2370 ft (722 m)
Casa Grande Mountain	Pinal	2350 ft (716 m)
Dobbins Lookout	Maricopa	2330 ft (710 m)
Dixie Mountain	Maricopa	2277 ft (694 m)
Pyramid Peak	Maricopa	2269 ft (691 m)
Mummy Mountain	Maricopa	2260 ft (689 m)
Two Peaks	Maricopa	2207 ft (672 m)
Ludden Mountain	Maricopa	2195 ft (669 m)
Ridgeback Overlook	Maricopa	2164 ft (659 m)
Shaw Butte	Maricopa	2149 ft (655 m)
North Cat Peak	Maricopa	2144 ft (653 m)
Silly Mountain	Pinal	2139 ft (651 m)
North Mountain	Maricopa	2104 ft (641 m)
Deem Hills	Maricopa	2098 ft (639 m)
Merkle Hills (Usery Park)	Maricopa	2078 ft (633 m)
Lookout Mountain	Maricopa	2054 ft (626 m)
Western Vista	Maricopa	2026 ft (617 m)
Apache Vista	Maricopa	2000 ft (609 m)

== Mountains over 1000 feet ==
Mountain	County	Height
South Cat Peak	Maricopa	1985 ft (605 m)
Stoney Mountain	Maricopa	1973 ft (601 m)
Shaw Butte Radio Tower	Maricopa	1960 ft (597 m)
Peak 1955	Maricopa	1955 ft (595 m)
Brown Mountain (Mesa)	Maricopa	1943 ft (592 m)
Shadow Mountain	Maricopa	1928 ft (587 m)
Veterans Mountain	Maricopa	1903 ft (580 m)
Thunderbird Peak	Maricopa	1862 ft (568 m)
Mount Ochoa	Maricopa	1844 ft (562 m)
North Thunderbird Peak	Maricopa	1831 ft (558 m)
Buffalo Ridge	Maricopa	1826 ft (557 m)
Middle Mountain (Maricopa)	Maricopa	1789 ft (545 m)
Poston Butte	Pinal	1749 ft (533 m)
Barnes Butte	Maricopa	1745 ft (532 m)
West Thunderbird Peak	Maricopa	1682 ft (513 m)
Tempe Butte	Maricopa	1496 ft (456 m)
Bell Butte	Maricopa	1370 ft (418 m)

== Notable hills – under 1000 feet ==
Feature	County	Height
Antelope Hill	Yuma	804 ft (245 m)
Fraesfield Mountain	Maricopa	600 ft (183 m)

== See also ==
- List of mountains of the United States
- List of mountain peaks of the United States
- List of mountain ranges of the United States
- List of mountain peaks of Arizona
- List of mountain ranges of Arizona
