= Black Mountain (Pima County, Arizona) =

Landform in Pima County, Arizona

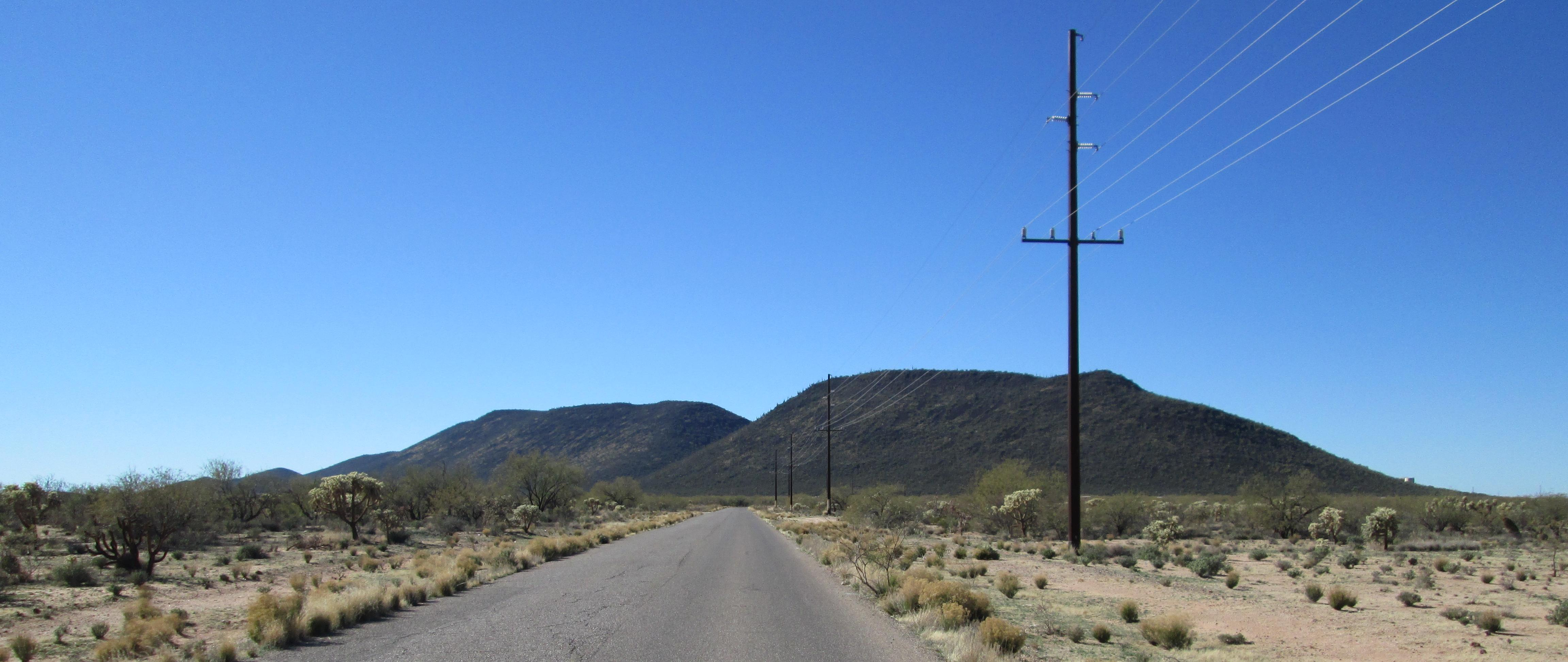
- Black Mountain from the east

Highest point
- Elevation: 3,700 ft (1,128 m) NAVD 88
- Prominence: 889 ft (271 m)
- Coordinates: 32°05′12″N 111°03′33″W

Geography
- Location within Arizona Location within the United States
- Location: Pima County, Arizona, U.S.
- Topo map: USGS San Xavier Mission

Black Mountain is a lava capped mesa in Pima County, Arizona, that rises 1,000 feet above its base to an altitude of 3,700 feet (1,128 m). It is a northeast trending ridge, 5,600 feet in length, located along Mission Road nine miles southwest of Tucson. It is on the San Xavier Indian Reservation, 3.18 miles southwest of the Mission San Xavier del Bac. The Sierrita Mountains rise to the southwest and the Santa Cruz River is about four miles to the east.

On top of Black Mountain are the ruins of an ancient Hohokam fortification. Long stone walls, circular stone rings, petroglyphs, man-made trails, and pottery sherds can still be seen today. However, the site is on reservation land, and is therefore not open to the general public.

== See also ==
- List of mountains in Arizona
- Tumamoc Hill
