= Black Mountain (Maricopa County, Arizona) =

Landform

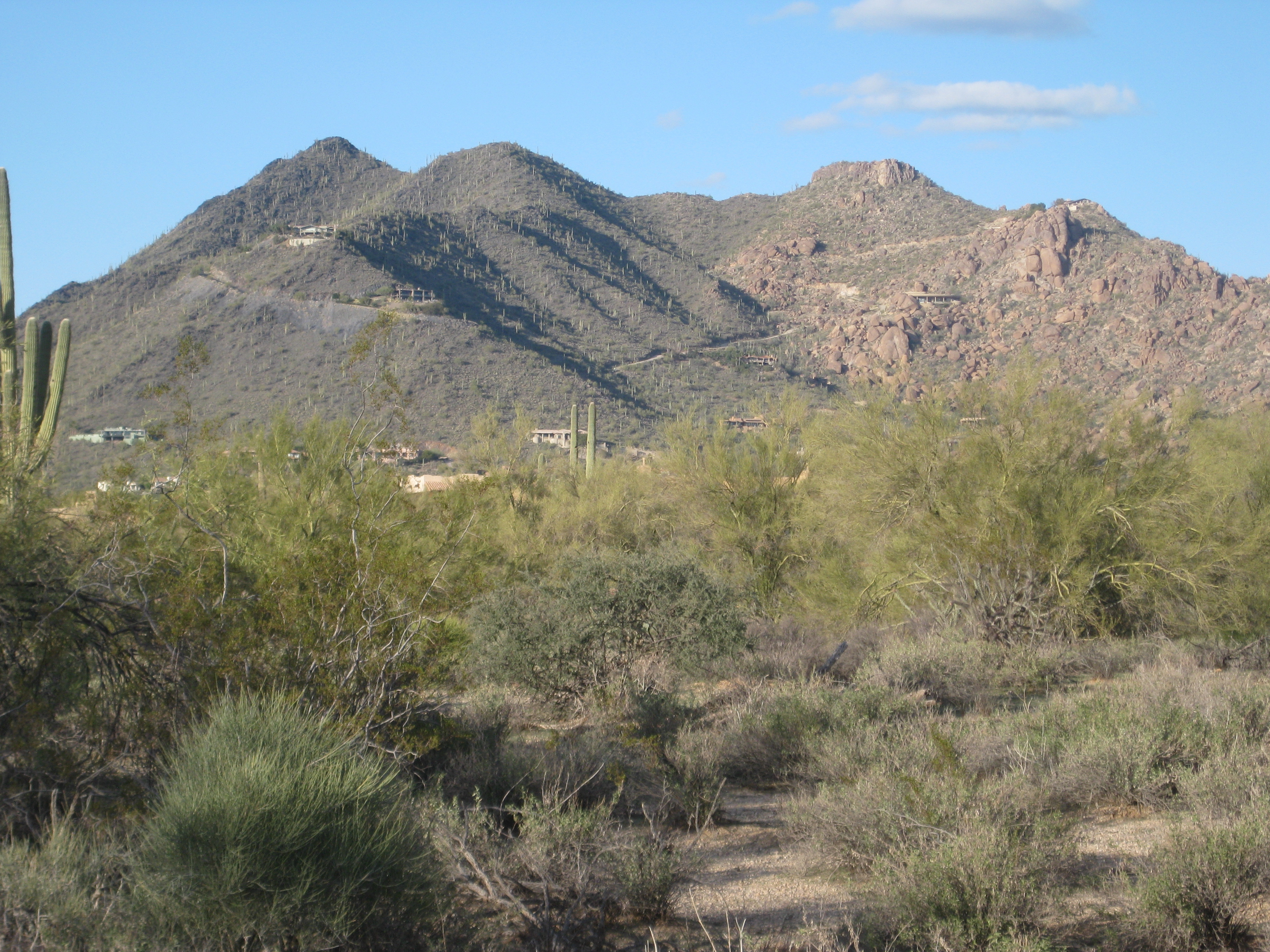
- Black Mountain as viewed from the south

Highest point
- Elevation: 3,403 ft (1,037 m) NAVD 88
- Prominence: 1,018 ft (310 m)
- Coordinates: 33°48′55″N 111°56′29″W

Geography
- Location within Arizona
- Location: Maricopa County, Arizona, U.S.
- Topo map(s): USGS Cave Creek, AZ

Black Mountain is located in north-central Maricopa County, Arizona, between the towns of Carefree and Cave Creek. The mountain has a popular and challenging hiking trail with 360 degree views of the Valley at the peak.

== Geology ==
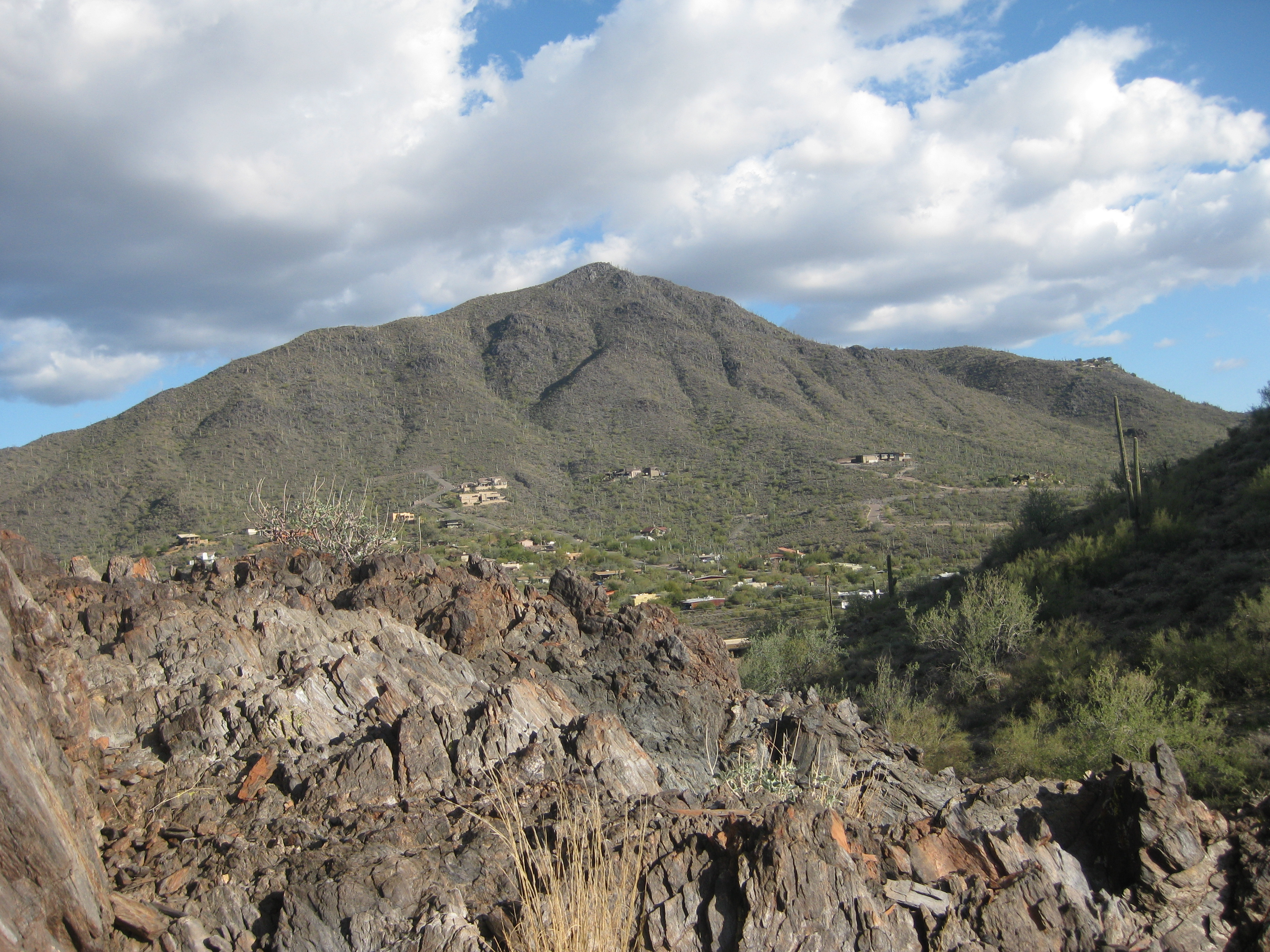
The western face of Black Mountain. The rock formation in the foreground is the same phyllite formation found on Black Mountain.

The mountain is composed of two main rock types that are roughly divided between western and eastern halves of the mountain. The west side of the mountain is composed of a ~250 m. bed of meta-sedimentary rock distinguishable as phyllite and argillite. From a distance, the meta-sedimentary rock is easily mistaken for basalt, which is common in the area, however basalt is not found on Black Mountain. The phyllite has a slaty cleavage and is foliated in all directions, a result of shortening due to pressure-solution volume-diffusion of as much as 50%. As a result of shortening, streambeds of nearby washes are filled with black alluvium.

The western face meta-sedimentary beds strike ~120, 45. When fully illuminated by afternoon sun, the dipping, angular rocks resemble overlapping flatirons. The meta-sedimentary beds rise nearly 1300 feet above the local topography. Black Mountain rises 3398 feet above sea level.

The eastern side of the mountain is composed of a granitic intrusion into the meta-sedimentary rock. The granite is part of a batholith dated 14 m.y.a locally known as Camelback Granite. It extends southward from Black Mountain and is expressed in outcrops in the McDowell Mountains, the Union Hills, and Camelback Mountain. Texturally, the granite varies from a large crystal with phenocrysts of up to 2.5 cm., to a finer grained crystal texture. Larger grained Camelback granite shows large joints fractured both vertically and horizontally. It is weathered into spheroidal boulder columns and balanced rock formations. Jointing in the finer grained granite is smaller and proportional to grain size.

The granitic half of Black Mountain tapers to a flat-topped peak that rises to a height just below that of the pointed, black phyllite peak of the western side. The two units meet as a saddle between the twin peaks of meta-argillite/phyllite and granite.

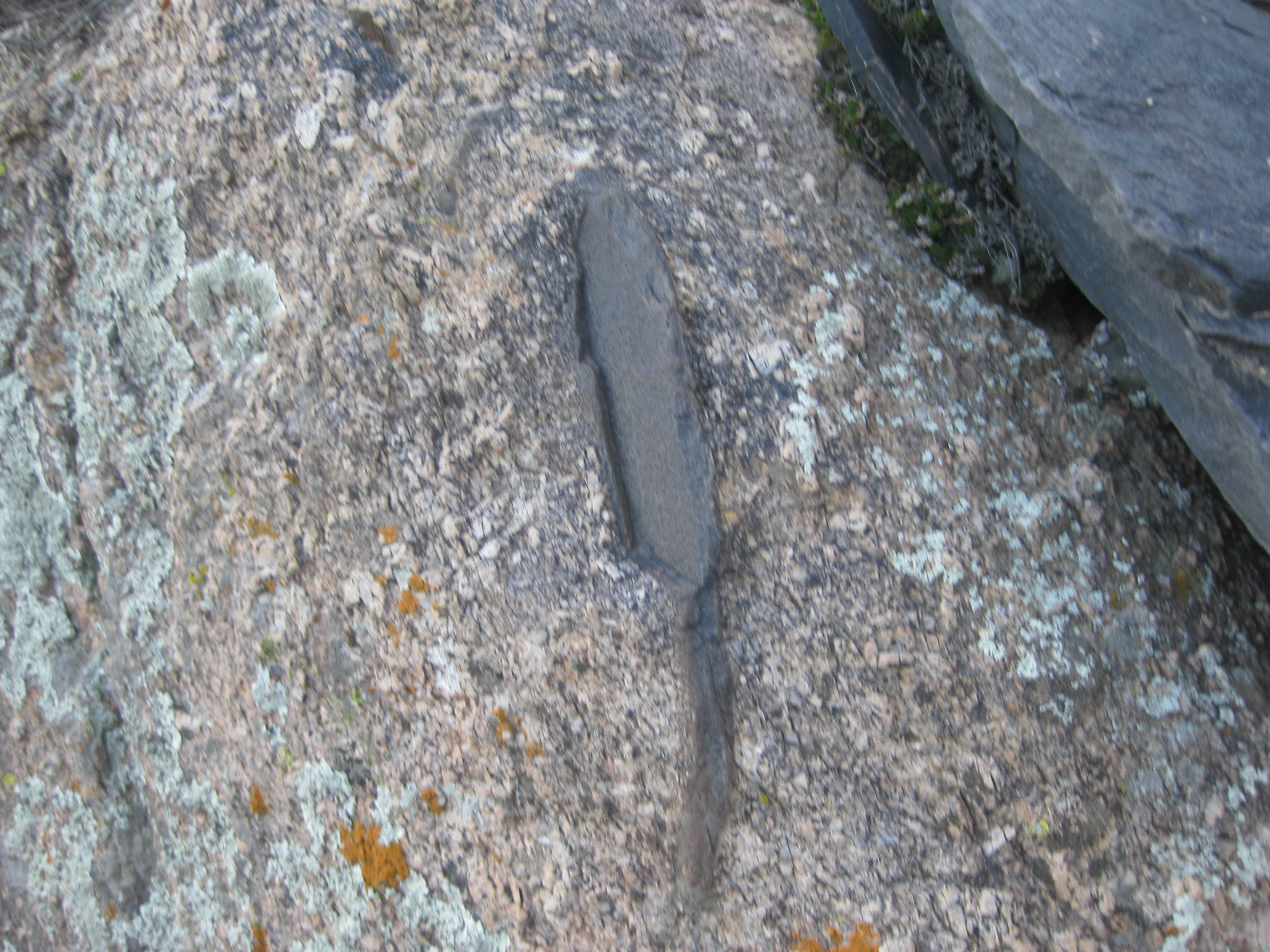
Phyllite embayed in granite along contact. The phyllite piece is ~20 cm.

Along the contact on the eastern side of the mountain, clasts of pelitic schist can be found embayed in the large-grained granite. The granite at the contact is gray in color, having been discolored by the sedimentary rock during emplacement. Clasts of smaller grained granite are also found in the large-grained granite. The meta-sedimentary rock along with the granite batholith that forms Black Mountain are remnants of what laid hidden beneath a sea and underground, that are now exposed by headward erosion that continues northward today into Arizona's Transition Zone. The highly shortened and foliated phyllite began as a mudstone which was metamorphosed to shale. The shale was then subjected to pressure-solution volume-diffusion; the rock was metamorphosed while deeply buried then subjected to heating during the emplacement of the batholith. The phyllite at the granite contact formed a weak horizon, which assisted the decollement process after the batholith was emplaced. These chloritic rocks acted as a lubricated sheet, effectively sliding off the batholith and tilting to the northwest during the Tertiary extension event. To the south, grabens that formed by normal faulting during crustal extension, are filled by the alluvium from the subsequent erosion.

== People and Culture of the Black Mountain/Desert Foothills Area ==
While Carefree and Cave Creek are today a home for upper-income retirees and an enclave for artists and entrepreneurs, the first inhabitants of the area surrounding Black Mountain were Native Americans known as the Hohokam, who appeared about 750 A.D. They were an agrarian society of hunters and gatherers who also used irrigation to maintain crops. Their "waffle gardens" can still be seen in the Spur Cross Ranch reserve area North of Cave Creek. The remains of dwellings of the Hohokam are called "pit houses". The best example of a pit house is located at the Sears-Kay ruin located northeast of Black Mountain near Seven Springs, although pit houses have been uncovered during construction of homes in Cave Creek. Pit houses were constructed with a rock-wall base and covered with roof supports of long branches covered with thatch.

The Sears-Kay ruins mark a time in Hohokam history when they had moved to high ground with views into the Valley, presumably to see their enemies, raiding tribes of Yavapai and Tonto Apache, approaching from a long distance. Evidence of the Hohokam living in the Black Mountain area disappears around 1450 A.D., when some anthropologists believe they moved into the Valley using their skill at irrigation and possibly becoming the Pima. Before disappearing entirely, the Hohokam stopped cremating their dead and began burying remains. Some believe the Hohokam ran out of wood for fires. Scarcity of wood was likely due to a long drought. Others believe there was a large fire which led to the sudden disappearance of the Hohokam.

From about 1450 to the 1870s the area was considered Apache territory. Bands of marauding Tonto Apache largely controlled the area. Although they lived farther north, the Apache were raiders that patrolled the area and when efforts were made to establish "rancharitas" in the Desert Foothills, bands of Apache would attack, and often kill, the trespassers. Efforts to settle the territory were intensified in the 1870s with the discovery of gold in the area. This was when Gen. George Stoneman and his troops built Military Road, a main artery in modern-day Cave Creek, to protect the miners and anyone else crossing through the Desert Foothills. A remount station where riders could rest and pick up a fresh horse before continuing on their journey was located at near what is now Spur Cross Road in Cave Creek.

After the U.S. Military had eliminated the threat of attack from the Apache, mining claims began to spring up in the Cave Creek area. The first discovery of gold was made by William Rowe on what became known (optimistically) as Gold Hill near the Tonto Hills northeast of Cave Creek. The area around Black Mountain was referred to as the Cave Creek Mining District, but the district was never formally established. In 1878 the first stamp mill opened at the Golden Star Mine on Continental Mountain. The most productive mine in the area was the Phoenix Mine was located at what is today the entrance to the Spur Cross Conservancy area. Tailings from the mining operation are all that remain today. The mine was closed by 1905, and most other mining efforts in the area had stopped by 1910.

In the late 1880s cattle and sheep ranches were being established wherever streams provided adequate water to support a herd, but recurring drought and overpopulation of herd animals soon led to water shortages, and the cattle ranchers were forced to look for new ways to support themselves. The answer for some ranchers was to transform cattle ranches into dude ranches where Easterners would come for a taste of the wild west experience. Spur Cross Ranch was one of the most successful dude ranches in the Black Mountain area, and remained in business until the 1970s when its owner died in a plane crash while attempting to land on a runway located on the ranch.

== Hiking Trail ==
Black Mountain has a popular out and back hiking trail. The trailhead is on School House Road in Cave Creek, AZ. The terrain is challenging with loose rocks and a steep elevation gain. The final section includes a vertical rock scramble, then a small flat area at the summit. At the top there are 360 degree views of the Phoenix Valley area.

== See also ==
- List of mountains in Arizona
