= McDowell Sonoran Conservancy =

Nonprofit organization in Arizona, USA

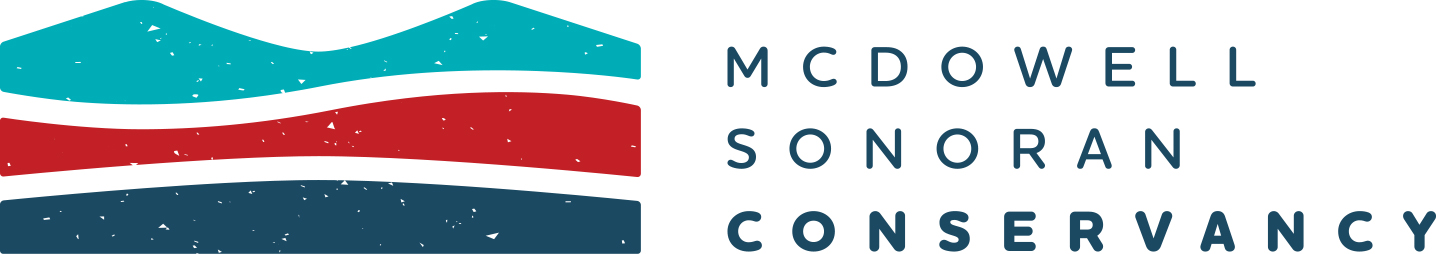
- Formation: 1991; 35 years ago
- Type: Conservation organization
- Tax ID no.: 86-0674350
- Legal status: 501(c)(3)
- Headquarters: 25941 N 77th St, Ste 2, Scottsdale, Arizona
- Location: United States
- Region served: McDowell Sonoran Preserve
- Board Chair: Mike Roberts
- Chief Executive Officer: Angy Shearer
- Board of directors: Karen Churchard; Mike Savastio; Benjamin L. Tate; Melinda Xanthos; Mike D'Andrea; Bill Hahn; Pete Hathaway; Mike Roberts; Amrita Sahasrabudhe; Scott Weiss; Susan Kanvik; Gunnar Sinnett
- Volunteers: 650
- Website: https://www.mcdowellsonoran.org/

The McDowell Sonoran Conservancy (The Conservancy) is an independent non-profit 501(c)(3) conservation organization. Its published mission is to “lead conservation in the McDowell Sonoran Preserve and enhance community well-being through stewardship, science, and education.” The McDowell Sonoran Preserve is the largest urban preserve in the U.S. (List of urban parks by size), located within the city limits of Scottsdale, Arizona. It encompasses more than 30,580-acre (12,380 ha) of upper Sonoran Desert, including large portions of the McDowell Mountains.

The McDowell Sonoran Conservancy, in partnership with the City of Scottsdale, provides for stewardship of the land within the McDowell Sonoran Preserve. A small paid staff works with volunteers, known as stewards, from the McDowell Sonoran Conservancy to assist the city staff. These services and activities include a volunteer stewardship program (see below), scientific and historical research, advocacy, and other activities that promote the use, protection, and enhancement of the Preserve.

== History ==
In 1990, with the combined population of the nearby communities of Scottsdale, Fountain Hills, Rio Verde and Carefree approaching 150,000, housing and commercial developments were beginning to encroach upon the McDowell Mountains. Local citizens who for years enjoyed unobstructed mountain views and unfettered recreation within the mountain range increasingly came to the realization that the mountains were unprotected.

On November 17, 1990, thirteen concerned preservationists and outdoor enthusiasts met at Scottsdale's Mustang Library to discuss preservation of the McDowell Mountains and adjacent Sonoran Desert lands. On January 21, 1991, the group incorporated as the McDowell Sonoran Land Conservancy, a non-profit organization dedicated to the preservation of the McDowell Mountain area. Signers of the incorporation documents were Jane Rau and Karen Bertiger. The McDowell Sonoran Land Conservancy initially did business using the name McDowell Sonoran Land Trust (MSLT). In August 2005, it adopted a new dba name: McDowell Sonoran Conservancy.

The MSLT board quickly realized that a reliance on private donations would not provide effective funding for the purchase and preservation of sufficiently large parcels of land. The board decided to turn to the citizens of Scottsdale for support. In 1992, they approached the Scottsdale city council with a request to develop a preservation plan for the McDowell Mountains and surrounding Sonoran Desert lands. The council created a task force to study preservation the following year. During this same period, MSLT directors began leading informal educational hikes into the future Preserve and writing numerous articles for local periodicals in order to build support among influential citizens.

The initiatives of 1992 and 1993 bore fruit in 1994, when the city council, acting on task force recommendations, created a permanent McDowell Sonoran Preserve Commission (Preserve Commission), and endorsed a plan to acquire 25 square miles of land. Public support came the following year when 64% of Scottsdale's voters approved a 0.2% sales tax to fund land acquisition. Land desired for the McDowell Sonoran Preserve was selected based on:

- Access potential
- Unique geological, historical and archeological features
- Ecosystem and wildlife habitat
- Scenic quality
- The potential for appropriate passive public use (i.e. hiking, biking, rock climbing, equestrian); and
- Corridors connecting natural open space areas

In 1998, the city's Preserve Commission recommended expanding the target size of the Preserve to 57 square miles. Mindful of public concern regarding maintenance expenses associated with a large preserve, the McDowell Sonoran Conservancy developed the concept of Preserve Stewardship, created a formal steward educational program, and graduated the first steward class. The stewardship concept as a partnership with city staff was purpose-built for the Scottsdale environment and remains a unique model among land trusts in the United States. Its value was particularly demonstrated in 2002 and 2005, when the Preserve was closed for weeks at a time due to fire danger, with stewards patrolling the Preserve perimeter and educating the public.

As Scottsdale continued to acquire private and state land for preservation, it became obvious that additional funds would be needed to complete the McDowell Sonoran Preserve. To that end, a city initiative was proposed and passed in 2004 to increase the sales tax by 0.15%, providing a total Preserve-dedicated tax of 0.35%. The passage of the increased tax was unusual at the time as the general attitude in the state favored tax reductions. Two bond issues supporting the creation of the Preserve were also passed, in 1996 and 1999, each with a voter approval exceeding 70%.

Acquisition of land for the proposed boundaries of the McDowell Sonoran Preserve is within 4,000 acres of completion. Currently, over 500 specially-trained stewards support Preserve operations.

== The McDowell Sonoran Preserve ==
Scottsdale's McDowell Sonoran Preserve is a permanently protected 30,000-acre sustainable Sonoran Desert habitat open for non-motorized trail use. The Preserve provides critical refuge for native plants and animals living near urban environments. The Preserve connects in the north with the three-million-acre Tonto National Forest and in the southeast with the 21,000 acre McDowell Mountain Regional Park, providing an uninterrupted wildlife corridor. Geologically, the Preserve is diverse. The southern portion, consisting mainly of the McDowell Mountain range, is largely composed of erosion-resistant metamorphic rocks formed about 1.7 billion years ago. By contrast, the northeastern and southeastern corners of the McDowell Mountains are composed of granite. An unusual feature of the northern Preserve is the appearance of geologically young (15 to 25 million years old) volcanic deposits from the nearby Superstition Mountains. Humans have inhabited and used the lands within the Preserve for about 7,000 years. The Archaic people (5,000 BCE – 500 CE) and the Hohokam (100 CE – 1450 CE) established many seasonal and temporary sites. The McDowell Sonoran Preserve currently offers approximately 120 miles of non-motorized, multi-use trails (hike/bike/horse) accessed from multiple trailheads. The Preserve's temperature ranges from 17 °F to 118 °F, with an average annual rainfall of 8.7 inches. Elevation ranges from 1,690 feet to 4,059 feet. The Preserve is open every day between sunrise and sunset. Dogs on leashes are welcome. Smoking, alcohol and fires are prohibited within the Preserve.

== Public/private partnership ==
The Preserve is maintained by a public-private partnership between Scottsdale and the Conservancy. Historically, Scottsdale took the lead on acquiring land for the Preserve and works with the Conservancy on stewardship and maintenance of the land.

The McDowell Sonoran Conservancy provides a number of services to Scottsdale for the benefit of the Preserve, particularly staff and volunteers to support Scottsdale in the work of protecting, promoting and managing the Preserve. Between 1998 and 2013, Conservancy-trained volunteers contributed more than 270,000 hours of services.

The relationship between Scottsdale and the Conservancy was formalized in December 2011 in an Agreement (Contract No. 2011-101-COS) regarding the McDowell Sonoran Preserve. In the Agreement, the Conservancy, as authorized by Scottsdale, agreed to provide staff and trained volunteers to assist Scottsdale in operations, maintenance, and outreach-related services and activities in or directly related to the Preserve. These services and activities include a comprehensive volunteer stewardship program (including patrol, maintenance, trailhead hosting, and education); facilitating scientific research; website and printing resources; and advertising, promotion, special events, and membership activities for the sole purpose of promoting the use, protection, and enhancement of the Preserve. In turn, Scottsdale agreed to provide on-site supervision, tools and materials, training or training design, authorization, fee reservations, direction and materials, reporting forms and permit formats, and use of the city's facilities.

On no less than an annual basis, Scottsdale and the McDowell Sonoran Conservancy meet to discuss existing Conservancy Preserve-related services and activities, and to jointly plan for the coming year. Conservancy staff prepares and presents a report to Scottsdale annually, setting forth its activities in the preceding year and its plan for the coming year.

== Advocacy ==
The McDowell Sonoran Conservancy obtains funding for its activities from individual gifts, foundation grants, donations from corporate partners, legacy gifts provided through wills and trusts, and gifts of land and stock. Conservancy members and supporters logged almost 72,000 hours of volunteer labor in fiscal year 2025.

== McDowell Sonoran Conservancy volunteer functions ==
Within the Conservancy there are eight volunteer programs in which stewards can participate:

1. Citizen Science: Protecting the Preserve is an interdisciplinary challenge, balancing the threats with the opportunities that coexist at the boundaries separating the urban from the desert environments. Citizen-scientist stewards support monitoring and assessment of the natural and historic resources in the Preserve, and share this information through educational talks and programs.

2. Community Engagement: Through pictures and words, volunteers deepen the personal connection between people and the Preserve. Those who connect to the land are more inclined to support community efforts to protect land resources. Community Relations volunteers convey the story of the Preserve to the public through a variety of programs, including a quarterly newsmagazine (Mountain Lines), community articles, photography, speaker's bureau and outreach at community events.

3. Construction and Maintenance: Volunteers maintain existing trails, help build new trails, conduct land restoration, maintain trailheads, remove non-native plants, and perform any other work that helps to maintain a healthy Preserve ecology and safe access for visitors to the Preserve.

4. Education: Steward education programs provide volunteers with continuing education opportunities, both in a classroom setting and online. Volunteers develop and teach courses on natural history, which include flora, fauna, geology, human history, and ethnobotany. Public education programs are also periodically offered.

5. Guided Hikes, Walks and Bike Rides: Public-guided hikes by trained stewards ensure that Preserve visitors have a knowledgeable hike leader to take them to beautiful and interesting areas of the Preserve. The hike leaders often discuss information about the best hiking techniques, map reading, GPS technology, flora and fauna, safe desert hiking skills, and stewardship.

6. Youth Education: Volunteers provide opportunities for the community's youth to learn about the value, significance and wonder of the McDowell Sonoran Preserve, through interactive tours and trailside learning. These stewards foster a sense of ownership and stewardship in the community, as well as an appreciation of the natural and cultural resources of the Preserve.

7. Trailhead Ambassadors: Volunteer ambassadors serve as hosts at the various trailheads within the Preserve. They welcome visitors with information about the Preserve, including trail maps, ecology and conservation value. Pathfinders help each visitor have a safe and enjoyable experience.

8. Patrol: Patrol stewards monitor hundreds of miles of trails on foot, horseback or mountain bike. They assess trail conditions for both safety and sustainability and provide reports that help Scottsdale and Conservancy staff to properly manage the Preserve.

== McDowell Sonoran Conservancy Parsons Field Institute ==
McDowell Sonoran Conservancy Parsons Field Institute is the research center of the McDowell Sonoran Conservancy. Its mission is to study the environment of the Preserve as well as the human history and human impacts. It does this via a full time team of scientists (known as Principal Investigators or PIs) and actively involving volunteers in research as citizen scientists. Research results are used for long-term resource management, education, and to contribute to the broader scientific knowledge of natural areas.

Research in the McDowell Sonoran Preserve using this model started in 2008 when a group of volunteers recruited Brian Gootee of the Arizona Geological Survey (AZGS) to assist them with an informal investigation of the geology in a small area of the Preserve. This work culminated in the publication of two papers through AZGS in 2010, one of which was the first paper submitted with non-geologists as the principal authors.

An anonymous-donor contribution in 2009 and a three-year grant from the Nina Mason Pulliam Charitable Trust in 2010 were used to formally establish MSFI and hire a staff leader. In 2013, the Citizen-Science program was initiated as a volunteer program of the McDowell Sonoran Conservancy, led and managed by volunteers under staff supervision. The Citizen-Science program offers specialized training for volunteers interested in participating in MSFI research projects with the Principal Investigators. Citizen-Science program volunteers do field work, data entry, basic analysis, mapping, and other tasks under staff or scientific supervision.

MSFI has published reports summarizing its work-to-date developing baseline surveys of Preserve flora, fauna, and geology. Current projects focus on various aspects of human impact, including the effect of trail traffic on physical trail characteristics and nearby vegetation, the impact of development along the wildland–urban interface, and monitoring restoration sites to assess alternative approaches. All the baseline and human impact research data will be incorporated into an Ecological Resource Plan for the Preserve to assist Scottsdale in making resource management decisions.

== Bibliography ==
- Chasar, Pete. (2009). "Desert Spring, Learning to Love and Preserve Wild Arizona". Privately.
- "Phillips, Steven J. and Comus, Patricia W, Editors. A Natural History of the Sonoran Desert". Arizona-Sonoran Desert Museum and University of California Press. 2000.
- "Jensen, Marianne S. Wildflowers and more". 2010.
- "Southwest Environmental Information Network (SEINet). Arizona flora/McDowell Sonoran Preserve".
