= San Xavier Indian Reservation =

Indian reservation

Coordinates: 32.054°N 111.070°W

Map shows the location of the Tohono Oʼodham Nation in Pima County, highlighting the large Tohono Oʼodham Reservation as well as the smaller San Xavier Reservation in red.

The San Xavier Indian Reservation (O’odham: Wa:k) is an Indian reservation of the Tohono O’odham Nation located near Tucson, Arizona, in the Sonoran Desert. The San Xavier Reservation lies in the southwestern part of the Tucson metropolitan area and consists of 111.543 sq mi (288.90 km^{2}) of land area, about 2.5 percent of the Tohono O’odham Nation. It had a 2000 census resident population of 2,053 persons, or 19 percent of the Tohono O’odham population.

== Mission ==
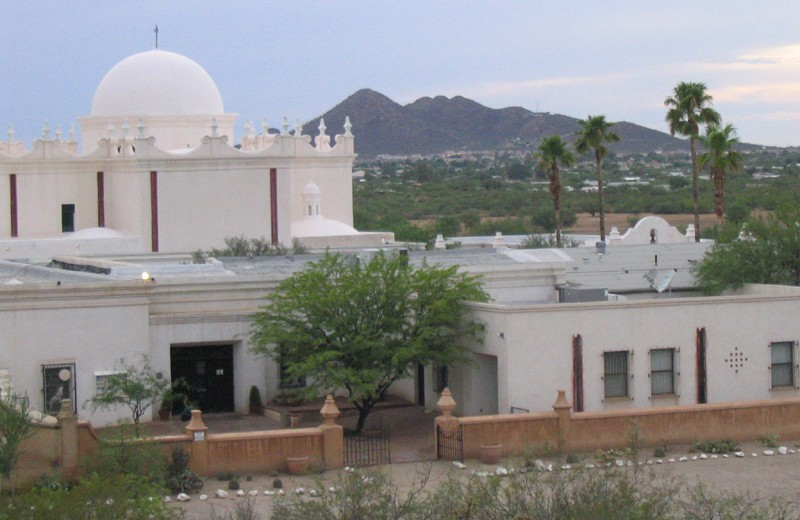
The Mission at the San Xavier Indian Reservation. August 2005.

The reservation is home to a Spanish mission, Mission San Xavier del Bac, which was built in between 1783 and 1797. It is a National Historic Landmark, and has been in continuous use for over 200 years. It was built by Tohono O’odham laborers.

== Gaming ==
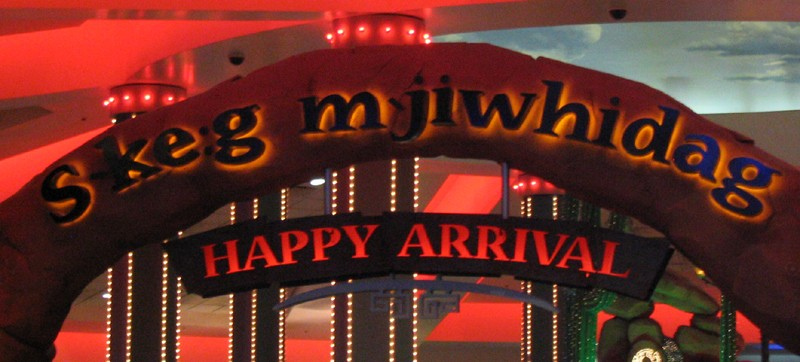
Inside the casino at the San Xavier Indian Reservation. August 2005.

The tribe also operates three casinos, two of which are on the San Xavier section of the reservation. The casino facilities, known as the Desert Diamond and Golden Ha:ṣañ, feature slot machines, table games, video blackjack and other forms of gambling. There is also a buffet. The facility also features a theater for live entertainment.

=== San Xavier casinos ===
==== Desert Diamond Casinos and Entertainment Tucson ====
Tohono O'odham Nation 7350 S. Nogales Highway, Tucson 1 mile south of Valencia Rd on Nogales Highway.

==== Desert Diamond Casinos and Entertainment Sahuarita ====
1100 W. Pima Mine Rd, Sahuarita South of Tucson at I-19 and Exit 80 (Pima Mine Rd).

=== Main Reservation (Papago Reservation) Casino ===
==== Desert Diamond Casinos and Entertainment Why ====
Highway 86, Why 1 1/2 miles east of Why, AZ on Highway 86.

This casino is located at the extreme western end of the main reservation (formerly known as the Papago Indian Reservation).

=== San Lucy District (Glendale, AZ) ===
==== West Valley Resort ====
Northern Ave and Loop 101 Glendale, AZ. Future site of the West Valley Resort at Northern Avenue.

== See also ==
- Tohono O'odham
- Indian reservation
- Black Mountain (Pima County, Arizona)
