= Silly Mountain =

Mountain in Arizona, USA

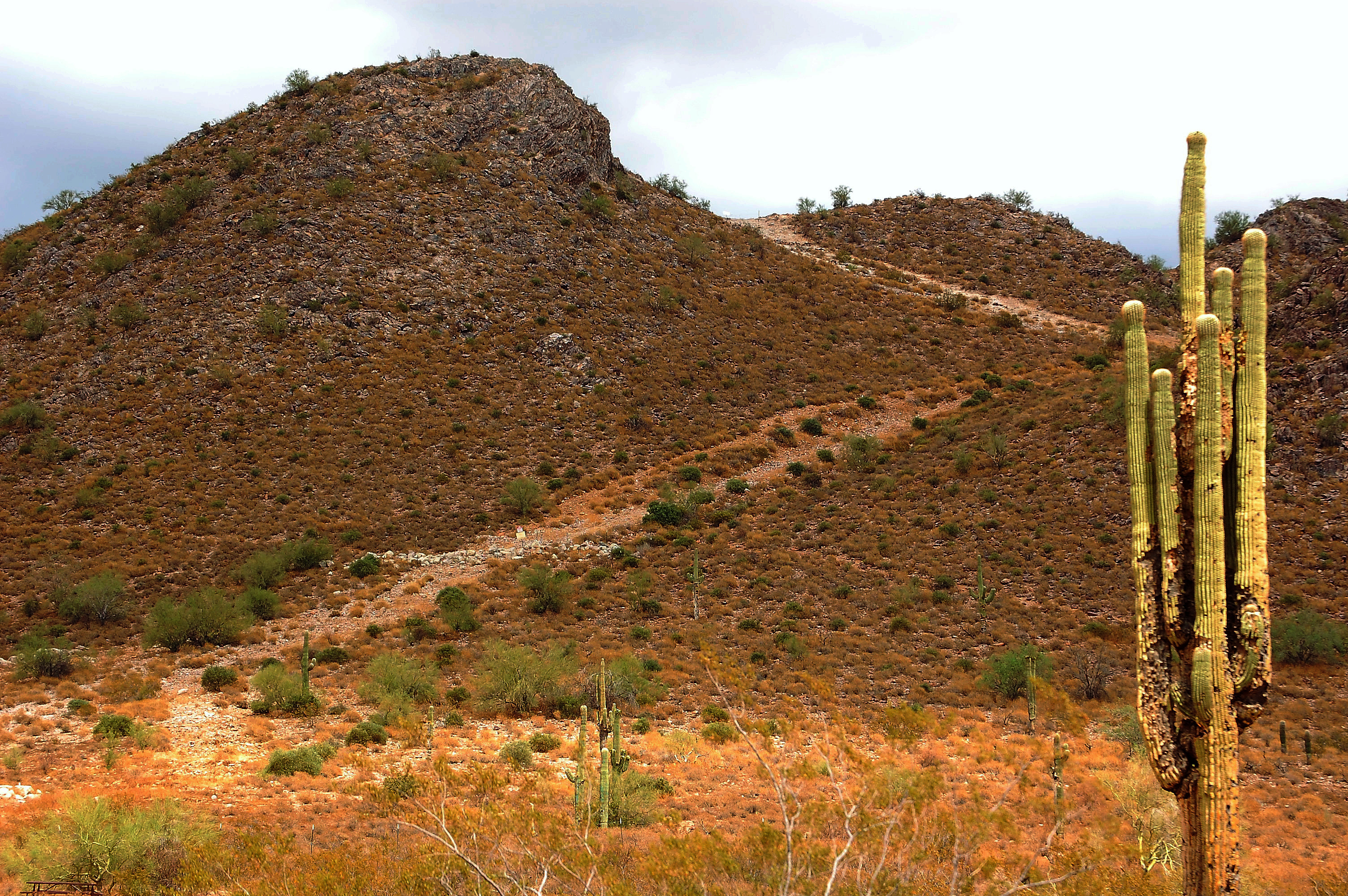

Highest point
- Elevation: 2,139 ft (652 m)
- Prominence: 359 ft (109 m)
- Isolation: 2.34 mi (3.77 km)
- Coordinates: 33.380551°N 111.483335°W

Dimensions
- Length: 3.5 mi (5.6 km)

Geography
- Location within Arizona Location within the United States
- Interactive map of Silly Mountain
- Country: United States
- State: Arizona
- Region: Pinal
- Settlement: Apache Junction

Silly Mountain, also known as "Roadside Benchmark", is a mountain in Arizona, United States, located near the city of Apache Junction. It is part of the Superstition Mountain range. The elevation of the mountain is 2,139 feet (652 m), and the prominence is 358 feet (109 m).

== Location ==
Silly Mountain is located inside Silly Mountain Park, on the edge of Apache Junction and Gold Canyon. The area is managed by the Bureau of Land Management and is open to limited public use. A communication site (location T.1N.R.8E.) was built for residential and industrial development.

AZ, 37 miles east of Phoenix and eight miles south of Lost Dutchman State Park.

It is possible to reach Silly Mountain by car since it has a large parking lot.

== Origin of the name ==
The mountain was originally named "King's Mountain" for local businessman William N. King, who owned a small ranch at the foot of the mountain in the early 20th century. In the 1970s, a Pinal County public works employee asked to name a newly paved road leading to the mountain; they named it "Silly Mountain Road". The reason for the name is unclear, but remains in use.

== Flora ==
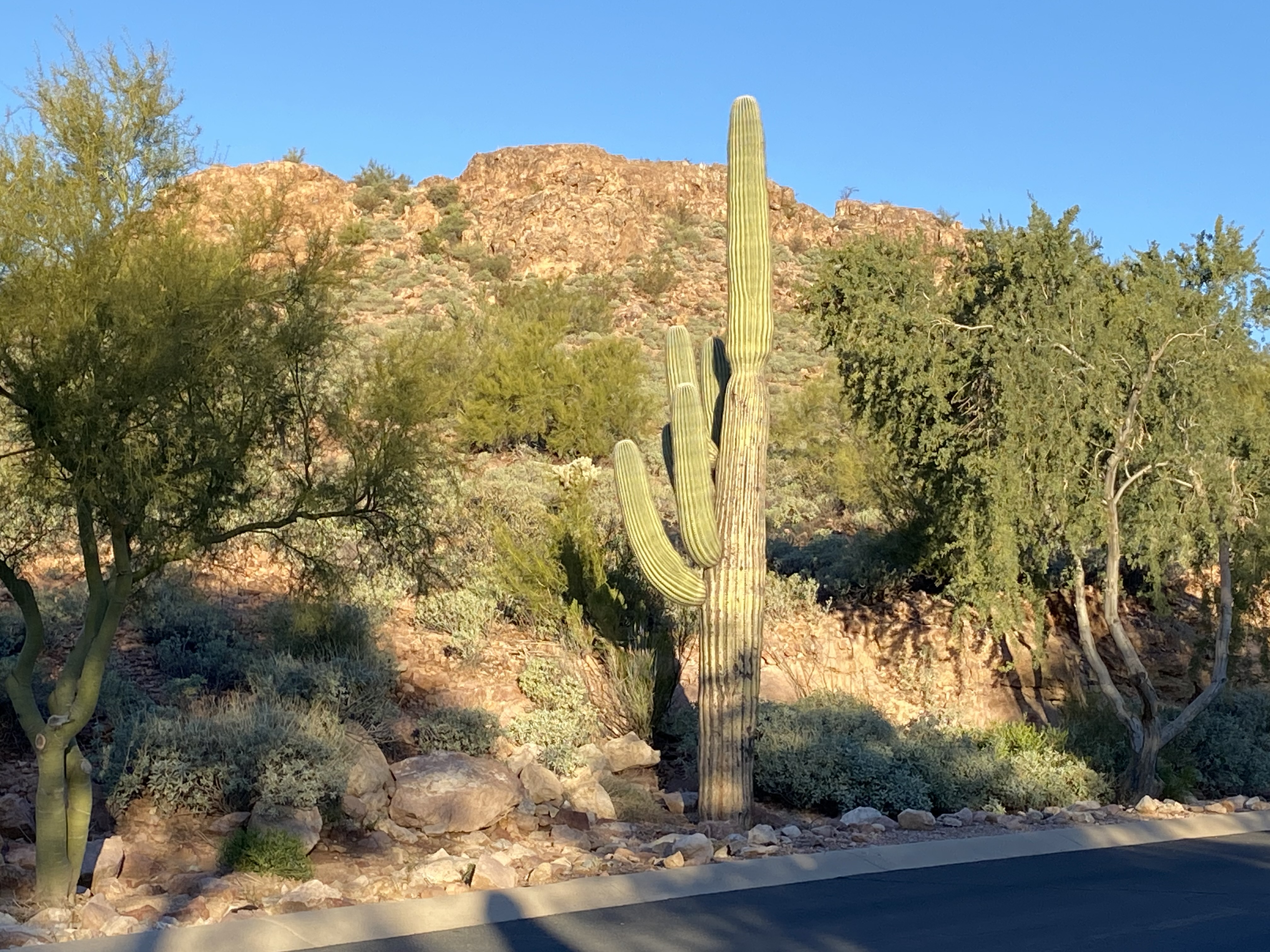
Carnegiea gigantea cactus on Silly Mountain, Arizona.

Silly Mountain is the habitat of the Echinocereus cactus, specifically a variant of Echinocereus engelmannii and E. acicularis. In the same locality are the Tree Cholla (Cylindropuntia imbricata) and the tree-like Saguaro cactus (Carnegiea gigantea). The mountain and its surrounding area present more than 280 different plant species characteristic of the Sonoran Desert. Prior to residential development in the area, visitors drove Jeeps and all-terrain vehicles up and down the hill during hunting season, killing most of the vegetation. Many Saguaro cactuses now show the effects of being targeted with firearms.

== Fauna ==
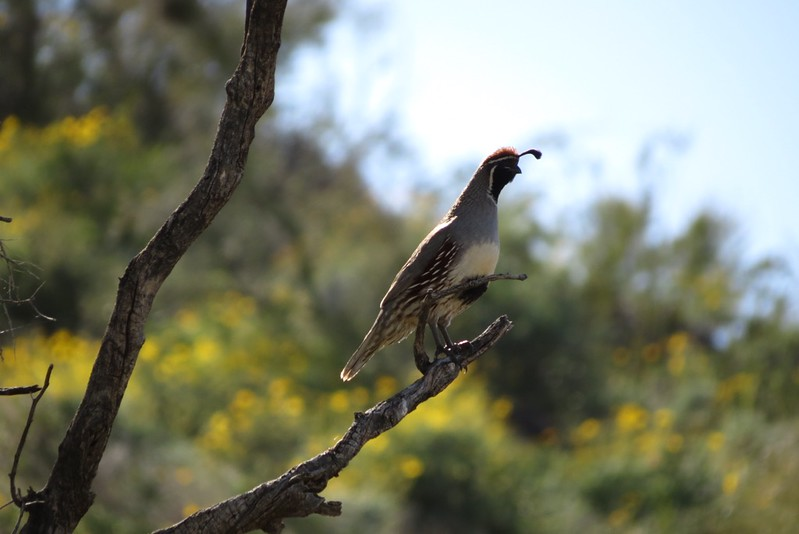
Gambel's Quail (Callipepla gambelii) on Silly Mountain, Arizona

The fauna of Silly Mountain is characteristic of the Sonoran Desert. Some of the most common animal species that can be found in the surrounding area include coyotes, desert mule deer, desert cottontails, greater roadrunners, bobcats, and gila monsters.

=== Birds ===
Silly Mountain is also populated by different bird species, characteristics of the Arizona environment. For this reason birdwatching is a popular activity at Silly Mountain. Among the 64 species that visitors reported the most seen are:

- Gambel's quail
- Curve-billed thrasher
- White-winged dove
- Black-throated sparrow
- White-throated swift

== Geology ==
The steep and rounded form of Silly Mountain is characteristic of the volcanic rock Rhyolite. The flow-banding of this mineral is parallel to that of Dacite, another type of volcanic rock, rich in crystals, and contains approximately 20–25% of phenocrysts. Silly Mountain is rich in silicon dioxide (SiO2) and such minerals as biotite and amphibole, present in both fresh and oxidized states. There is a concentration of approximately 28 percent of plagioclase grains, and subrounded grains of quartz and zircon are also present. The major rocks are:

- Bedded tuff
- Dacite
- Intrusive rhyolite
- Rhyolite
- Quaternary surficial deposits

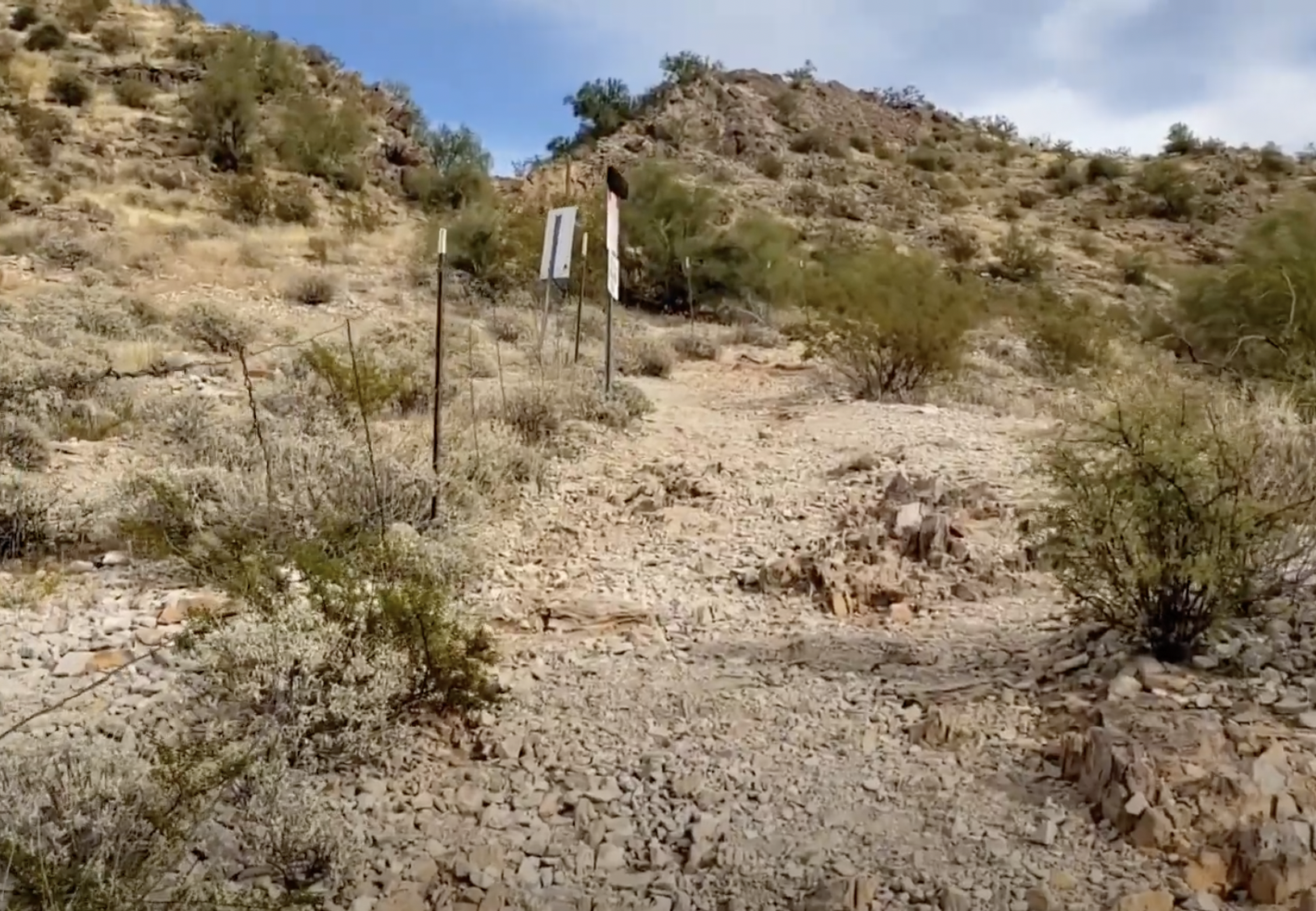
Old Mine Trail path leading up to the Silly Mountain Mine

=== Mining ===
Silly Mountain Mine is on the side of the mountain. Given the successful gold mines in the surrounding area, it is assumed that Silly Mountain Mine was opened with the expectation of locating ore. The mine has not been fruitful due to the lack of valuable metals. By filling the shaft to a depth of about 1.5 meters (4.9 feet), any potential hazards have been removed. The mine can be reached by taking the Old Mine Trail path.

== Recreation ==
=== Mountain biking ===
Silly Mountain biking trails are of varying levels of difficulty. Palo Verde trail and the Brittle Brush trail are easy trails that do not require a high level of expertise and include just a few switchbacks and a hike-a-bike part at the end of the Palo Verde trail. Superstition View trail, from which Superstition Mountains are visible, is considered an easy trail until the connection with the Jackrabbit trail, where there are some rugged and difficult spots. The Crest trail and the Old Mine trail are difficult trails that require some skills with switchbacks and steep and technical climbs.

=== Hiking ===
There is a total of 10 hiking trails in Silly Mountain Park, ranging in length from 45 meters (148 feet) to 1.77 kilometers (1.10 miles). The combined length of all hiking trails equals to 5.63 kilometers (3.50 miles) of 10 trails that are no longer available to off-road vehicles and it takes an average of one hour, nine minutes to complete them. Historically, it has evolved from having only one steep trail to incorporating numerous trail branches with different levels of difficulty.

=== Botanical walk ===
The Botanical Walk was completed in October 2010, through the collaboration between the Superstition Area Land Trust (SALT) and Apache Junction Parks and Recreation departments. The idea first came from Don Wells, SALT vice-president, then the walk was realized through the funding for $35,000 from Nina Mason Pulliam Charitable Trust. The water lines and drip system were installed by the Apache Junction Parks and Recreation staff; the construction of the pathway has been accomplished by the SALT Trail Builders Crew.

The trail is 0.3 miles (480 m) long, accessible to people of all ages, and is also wheelchair accessible. The trail is surrounded by more than 280 native plants of 35 different species, paired with signs describing plant characteristics. The plants were mainly donated by local businesses and companies.

== Silly Mountain Park ==
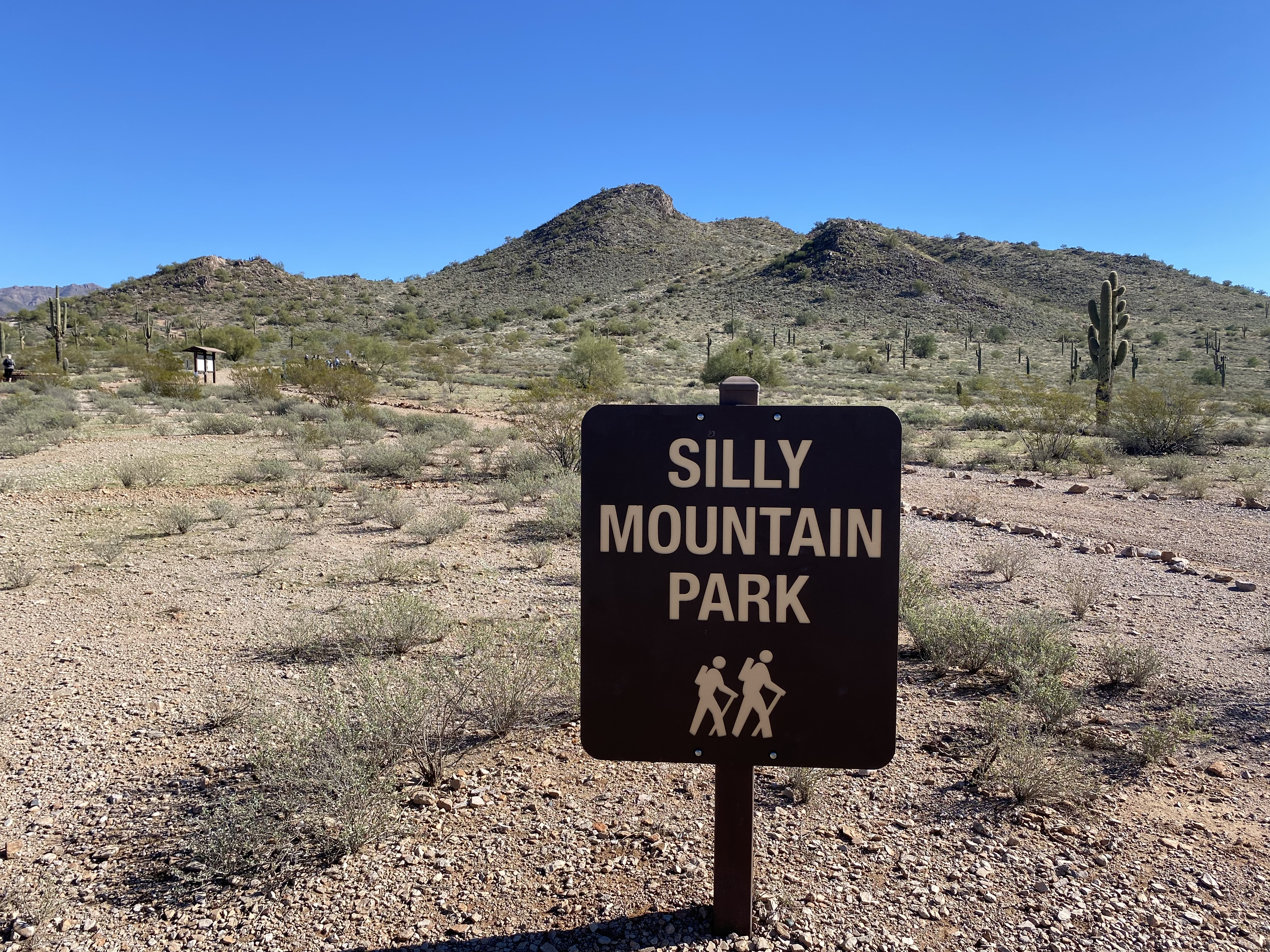
A sign in Silly Mountain Park, Arizona.

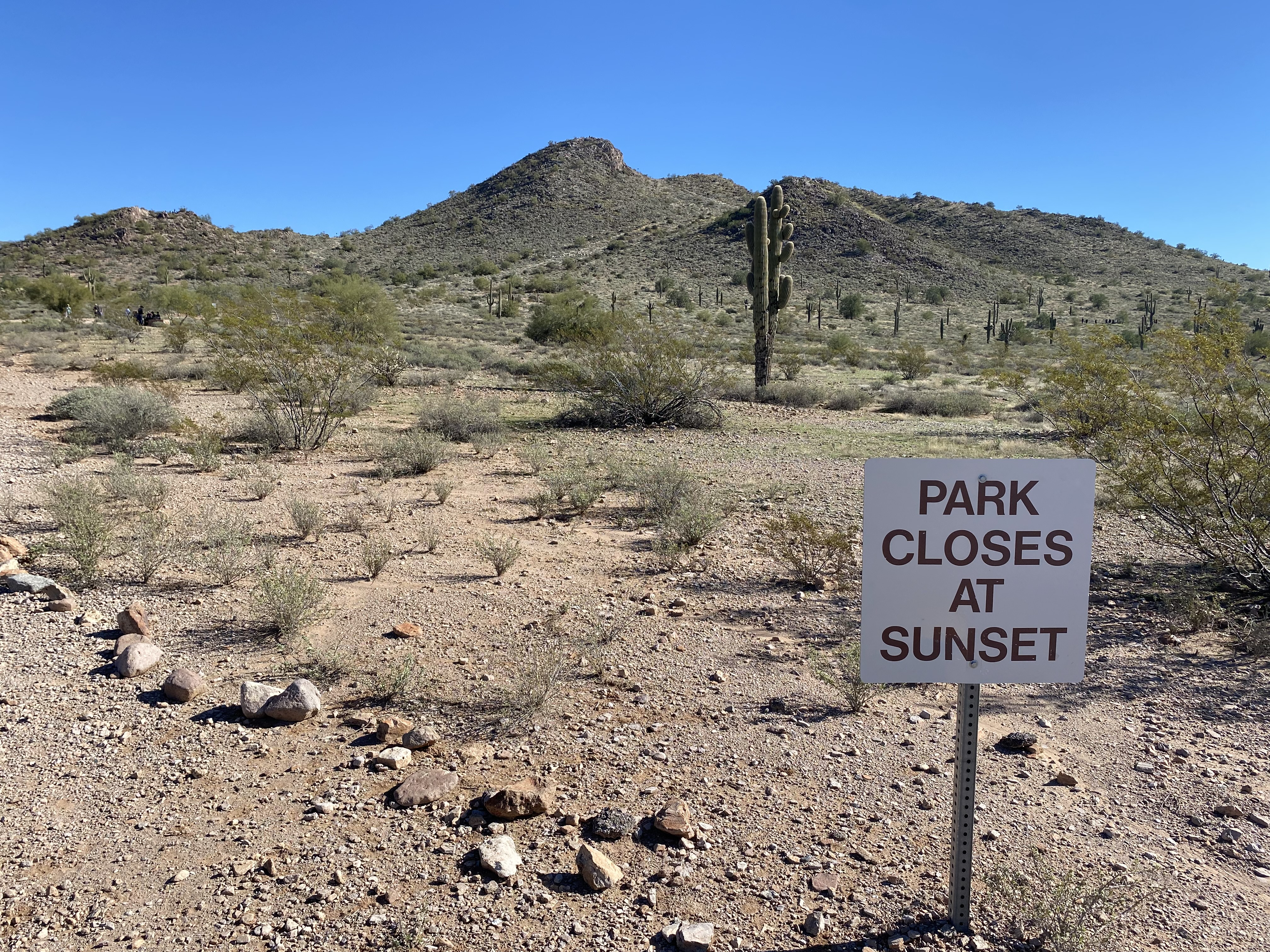
"Park closes at sunset" sign in Silly Mountain Park, Arizona.

Silly Mountain Park is managed by the city of Apache Junction.

Superstition Area Land Trust (S.A.L.T) and the town of Apache Junction collaborated in 2007 to restore Silly Mountain, creating Silly Mountain Park, a maintained recreational area with preserved desert vegetation. Superstition Area Land and Trust area was seriously damaged by fires and off-road vehicles that caused significant erosion of the surface of the mountain.

A large eroded wall characterized by scree was created, which can also be seen from US Route 60, approximately a half-mile to the west. In 2008, a non-profit educational corporation called Superstition Area Land Trust worked to recover Silly Mountain and the surrounding area. Through the collaboration with Apache Junction Park and Recreation, the Superstition Area Land Trust fixed and restored the entire area, also new hiking trails and new regional grasses were traced. Through donations, support of volunteers, community organizations and local businesses the area of Silly Mountain was restructured and it became the Silly Mountain Park.

== Gallery ==
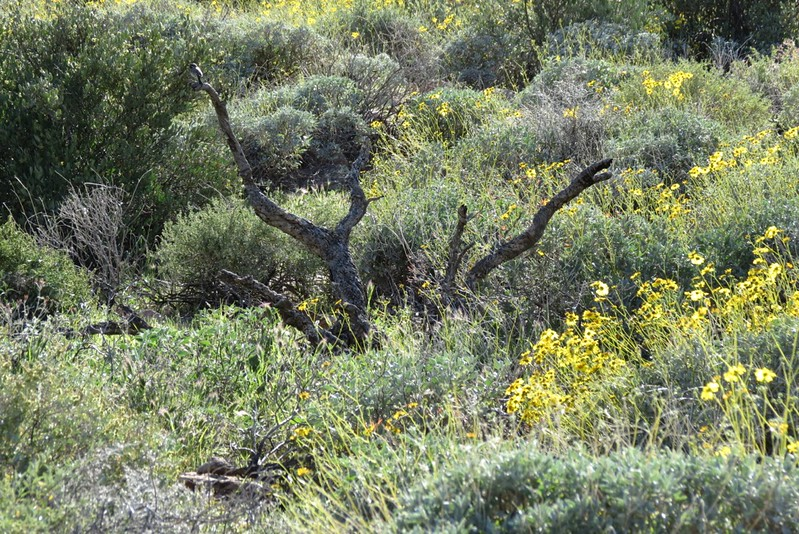
Flora of Silly Mountain, Arizona.

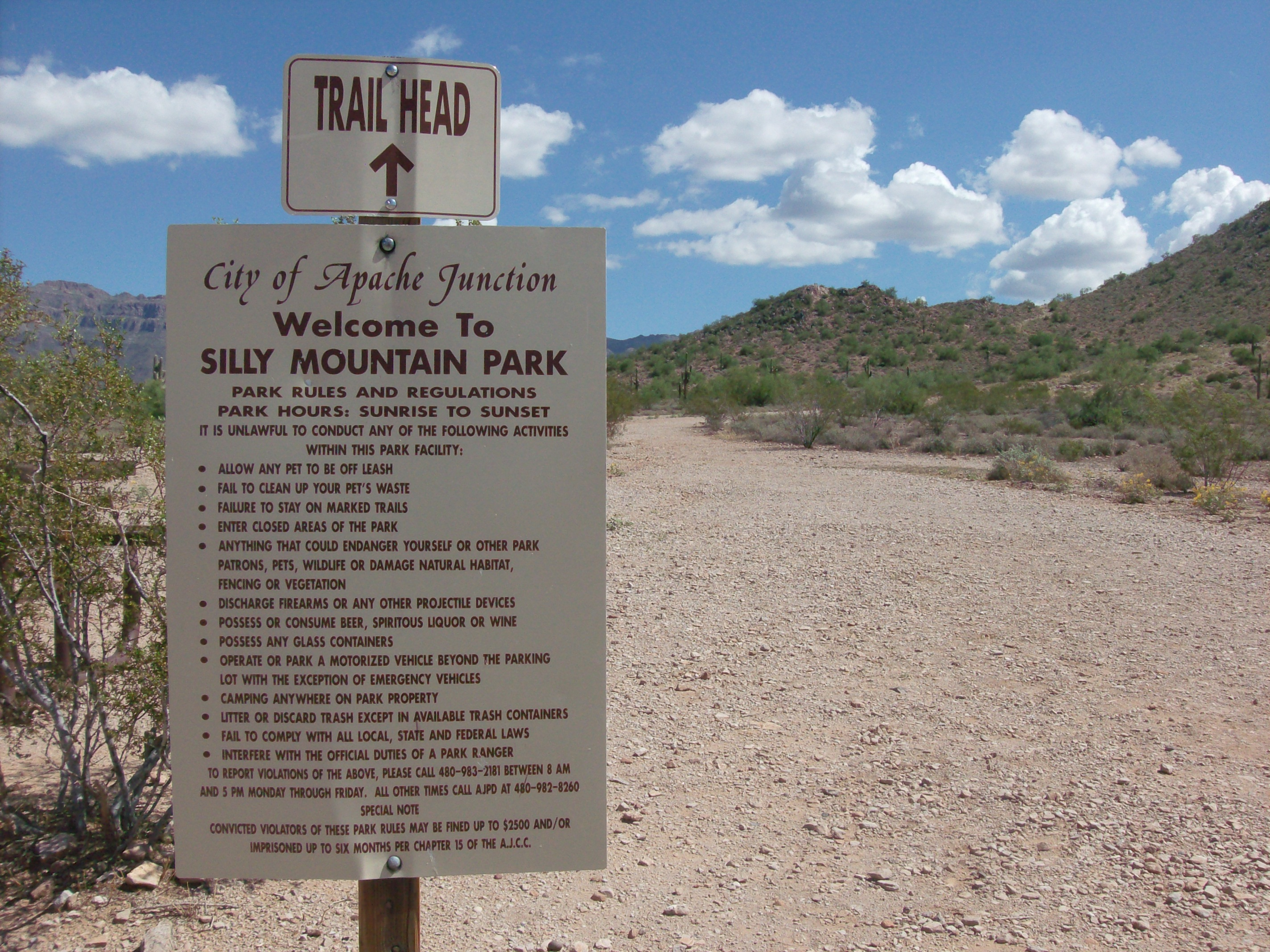
Silly Mountain Park Entrance Sign, Silly Mountain, Arizona.

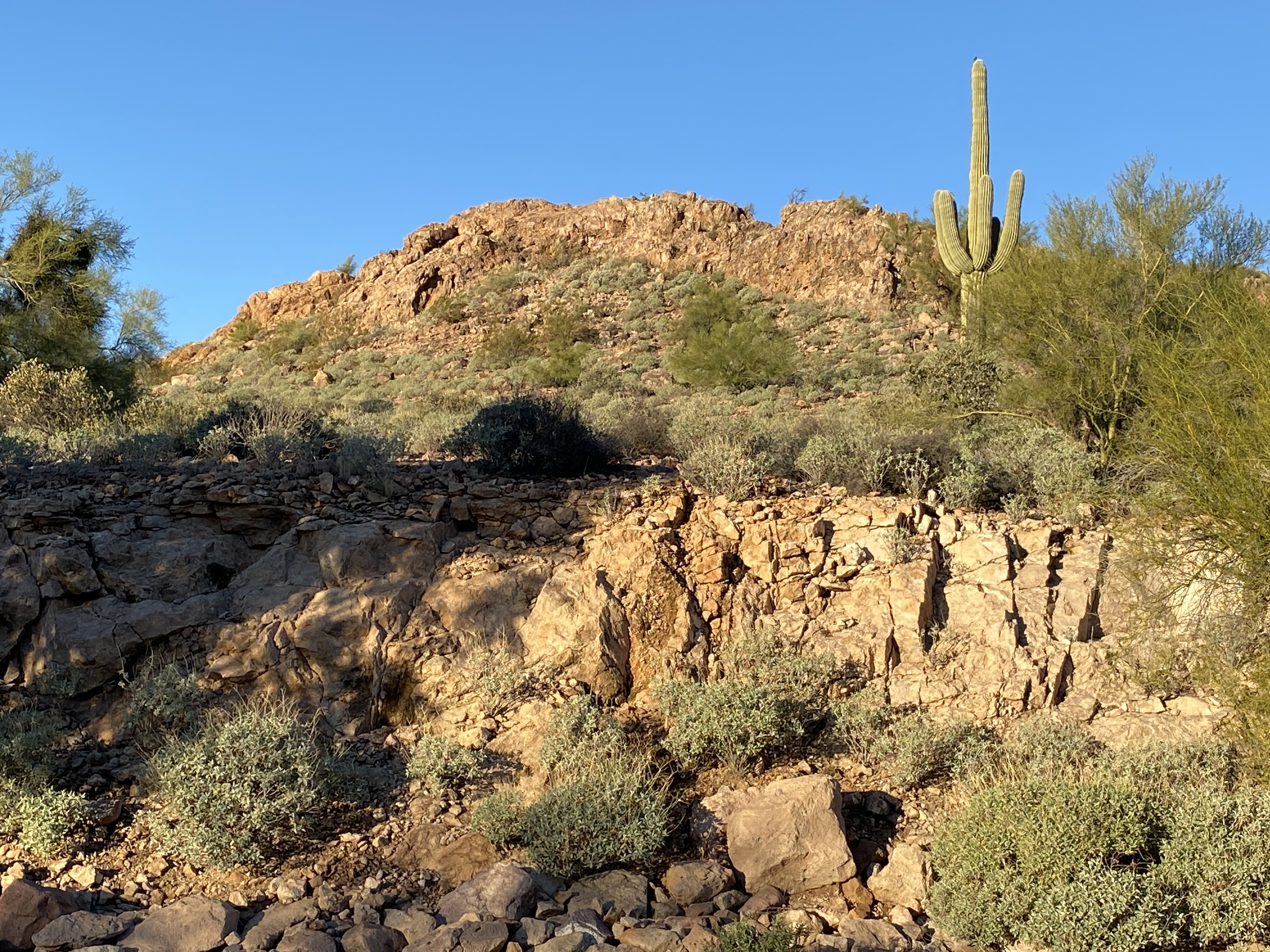
Flora in Silly Mountain, Arizona.

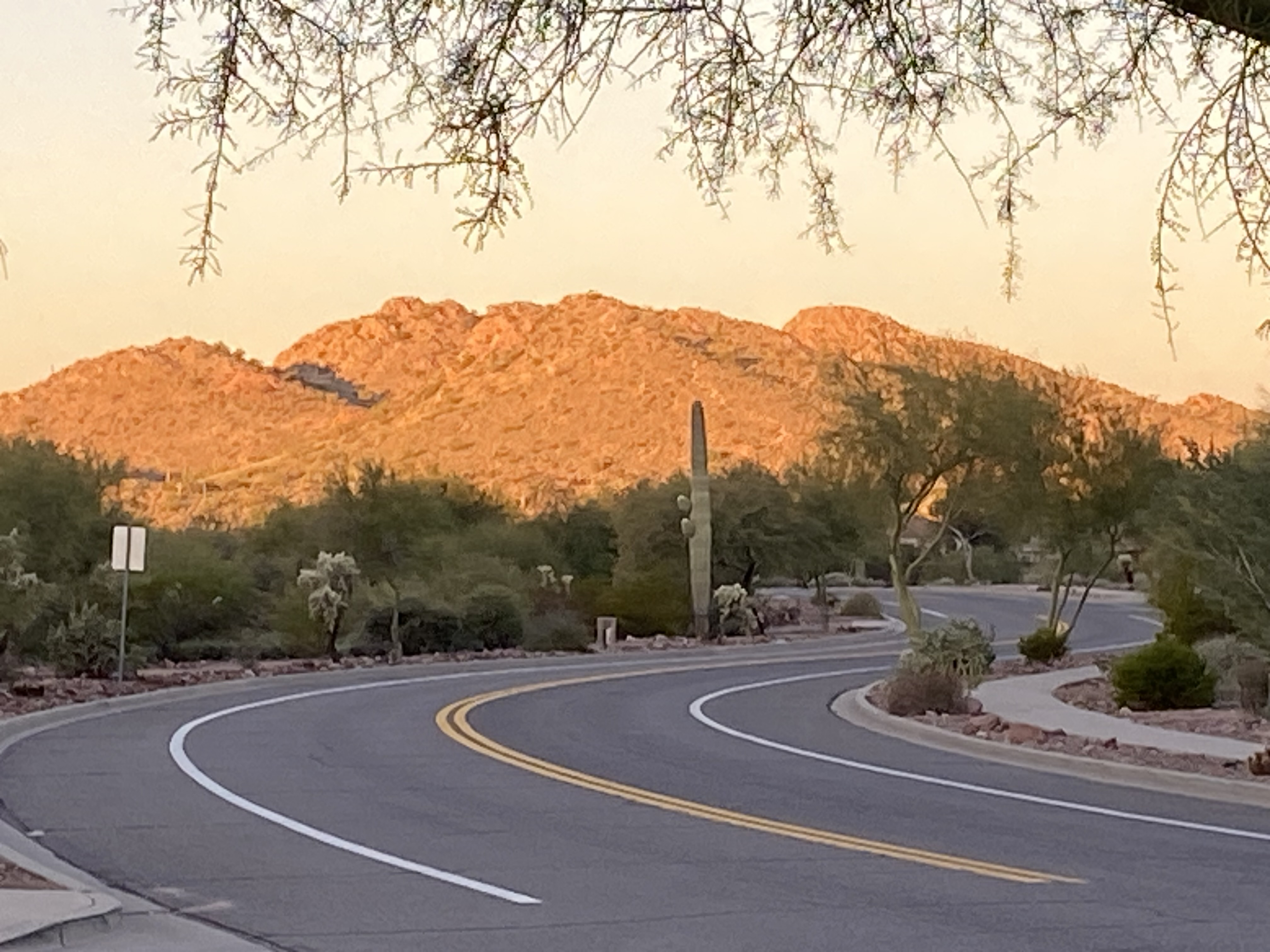
View from the Gold Canyon, showing the eastern side of Silly Mountain, Arizona.

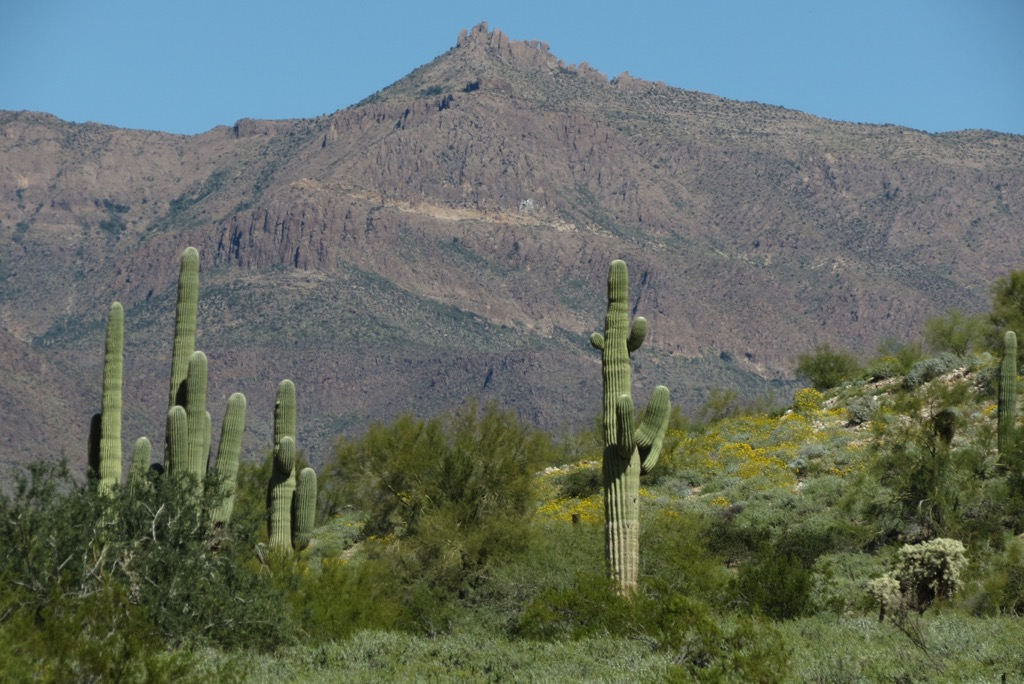
Carnegiea gigantea cacti on Silly Mountain, Arizona.

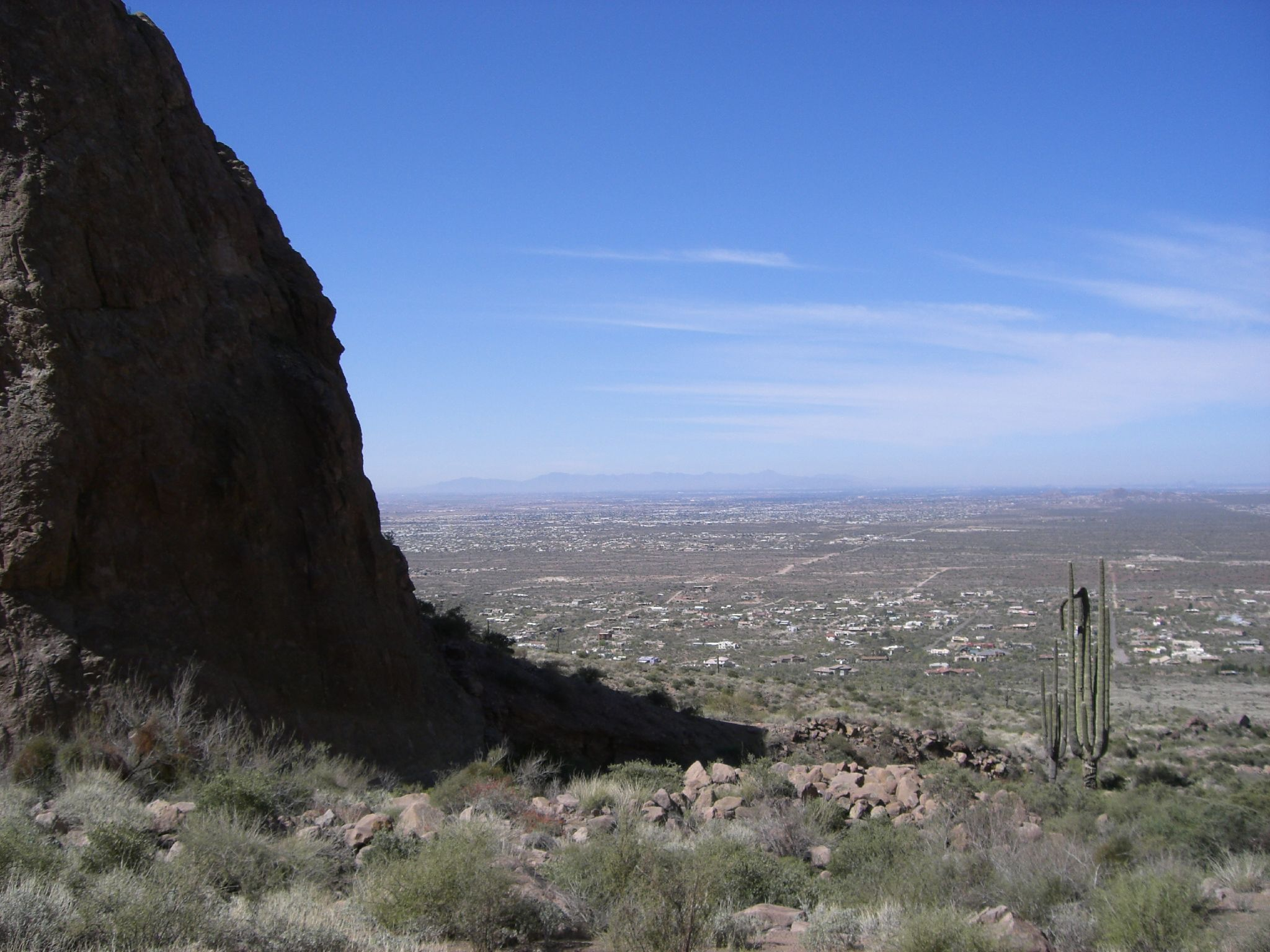
View from Silly Mountain, Arizona.

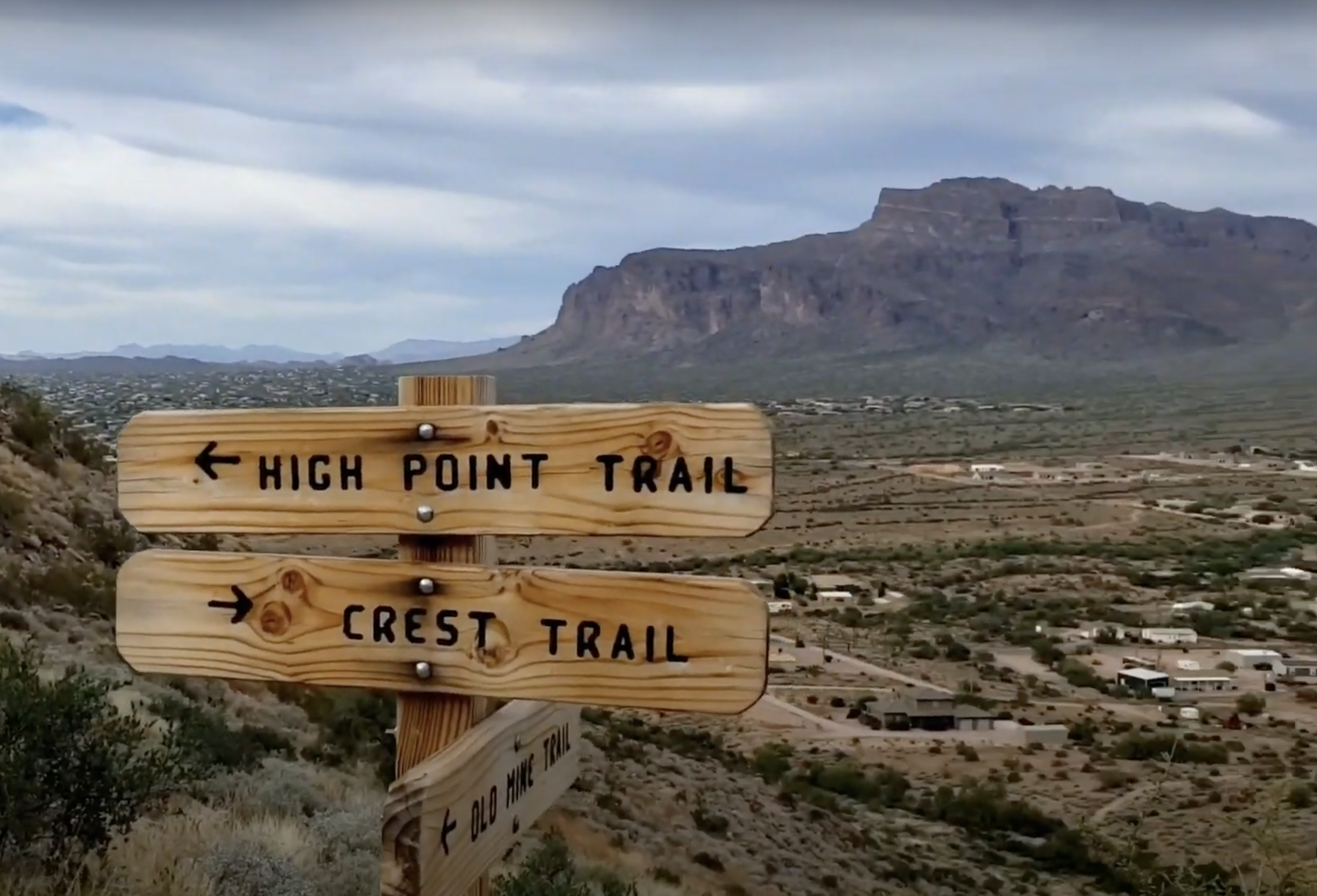
Signs of "High Point Trail" and "Crest Trail" on Silly Mountain, Arizona

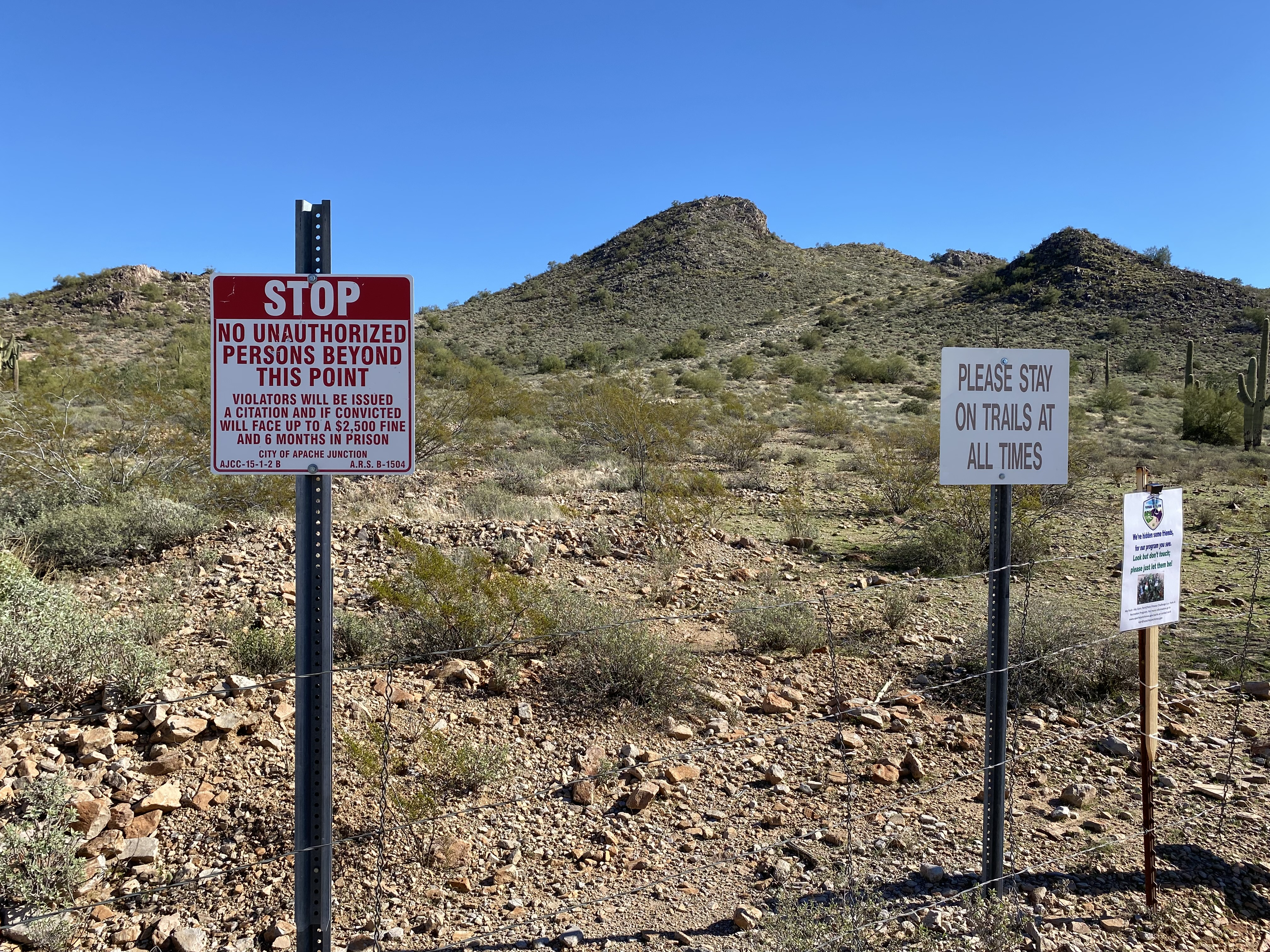
More signs at Silly Mountain Park, Arizona.

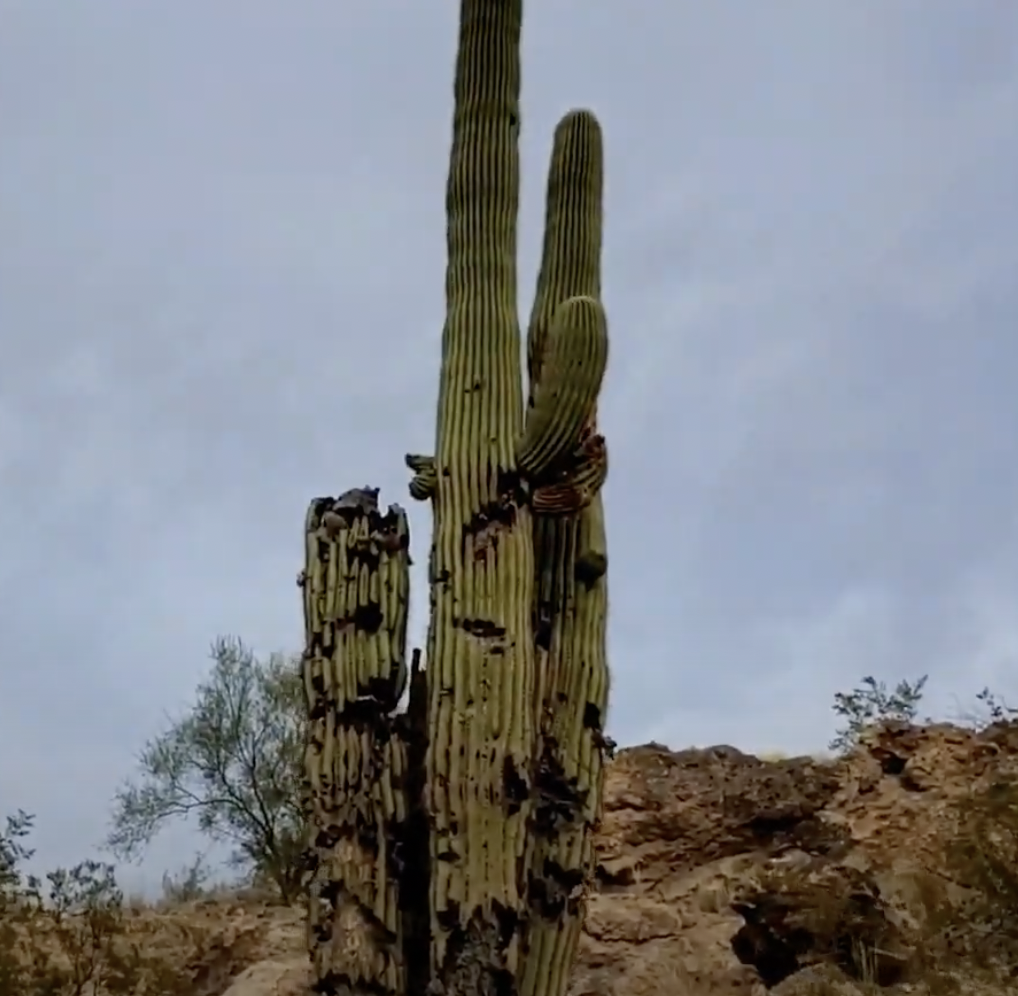
Damaged Carnegiea gigantea cactus on Silly Mountain, Arizona.

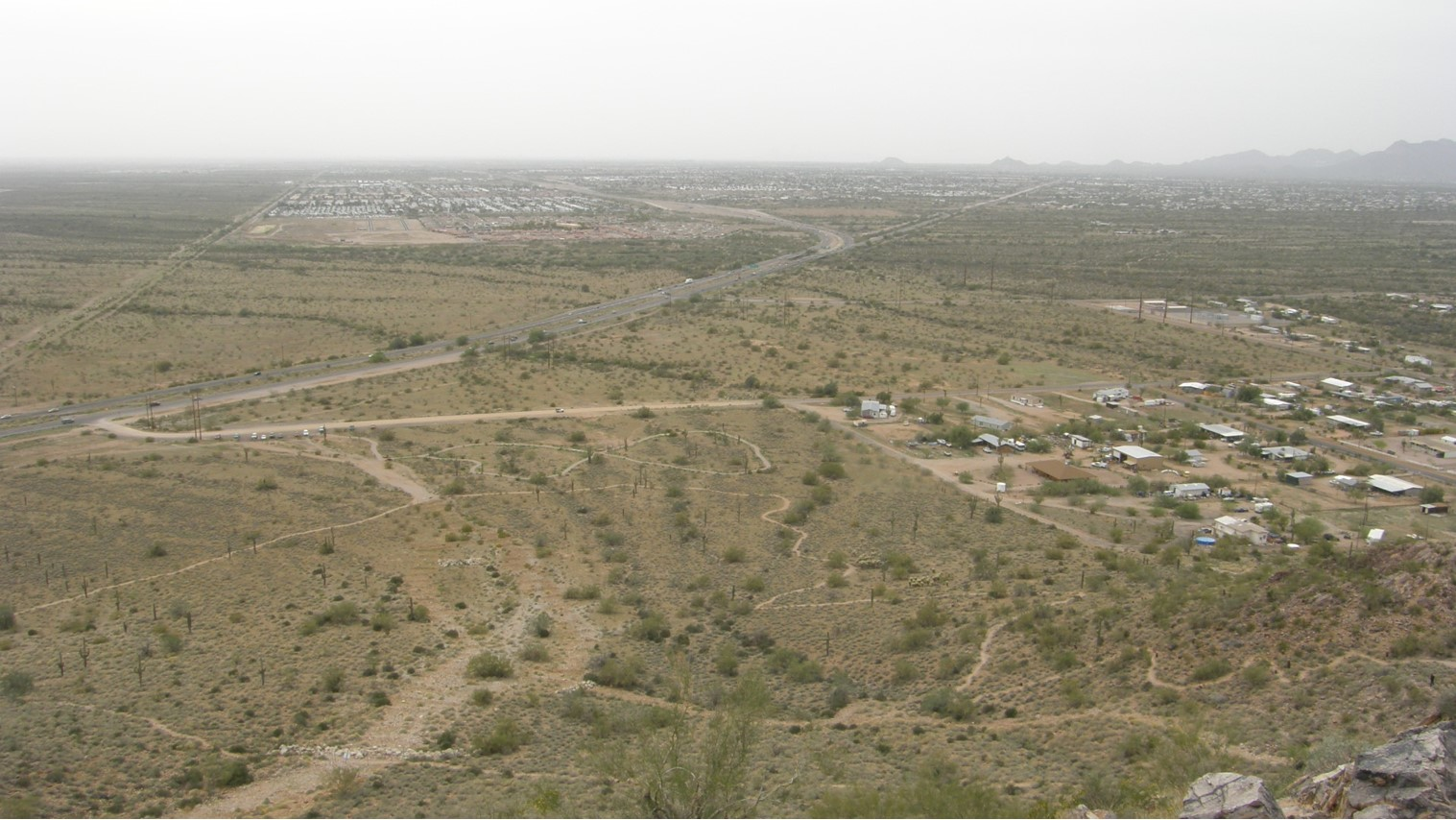
View westward from summit of Silly Mountain, Arizona.

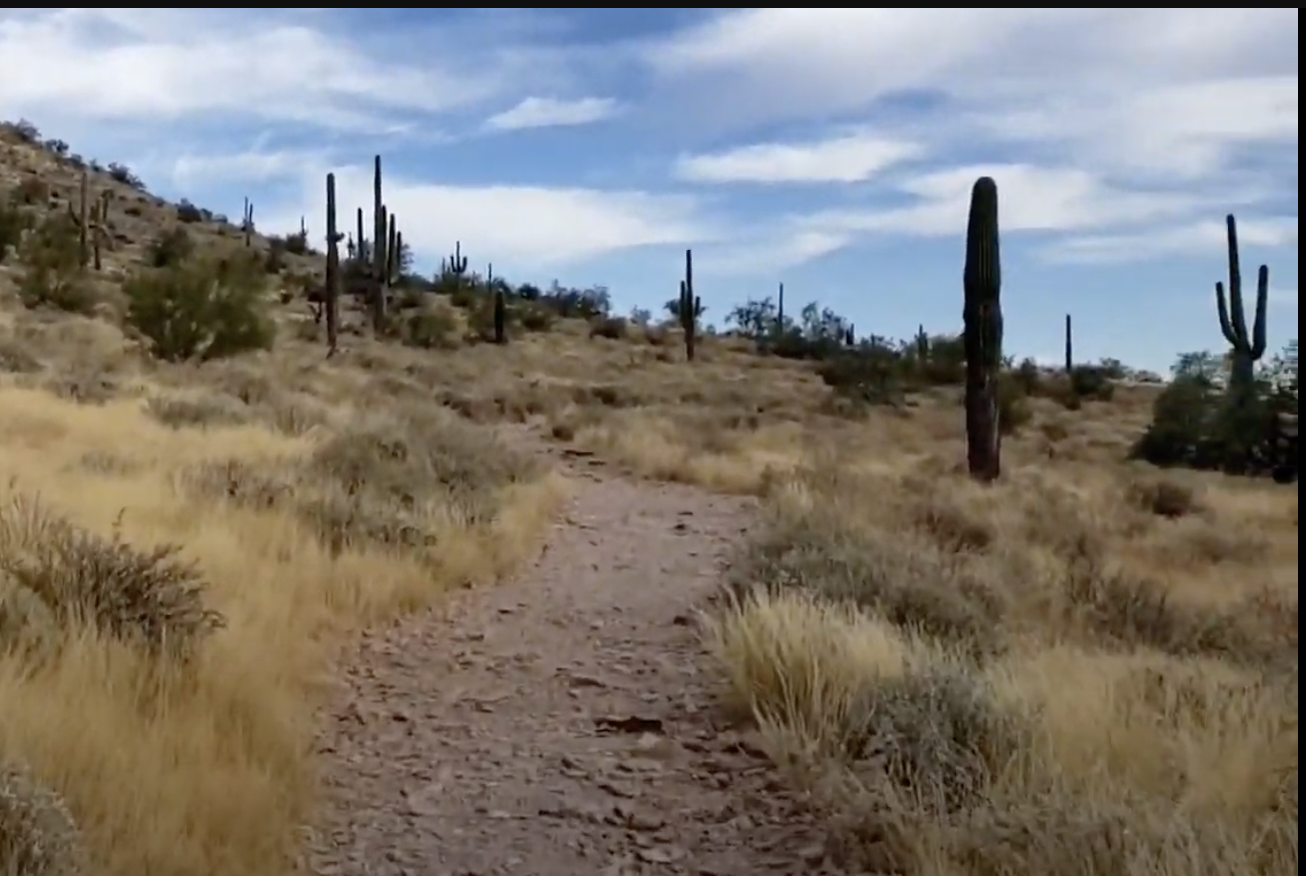
Old Mine Trail on Silly Mountain, Arizona.

== See also ==
- List of mountains and hills of Arizona by height
- List of mountain ranges of Arizona
- List of mountain peaks of Arizona
- Portal:Mountains
