= Arrowhead Mountain (Beaverhead County, Montana) =

Mountain in Beaverhead County, Montana, United States

Coordinates: 44°34′42″N 111°39′36″W

Arrowhead Mountain is a 6,936-foot (2,114 m) mountain in Beaverhead County, Montana, United States.
