= Arrowhead Mountain (British Columbia) =

Mountain in British Columbia, Canada

- Location within British Columbia
- Interactive map of Arrowhead Mountain

Highest point
- Elevation: 2,185 m (7,169 ft)
- Prominence: 126 m (413 ft)
- Parent peak: Long Peak (2301 m)
- Listing: Mountains of British Columbia
- Coordinates: 50°07′50″N 122°20′07″W

Geography
- Country: Canada
- Province: British Columbia
- District: Lillooet Land District
- Parent range: Lillooet Ranges
- Topo map: NTS 92J1 Stein Lake

Arrowhead Mountain is a 2,185-metre (7,169 ft) mountain located east of Lizzie Lake in the Lillooet Ranges of British Columbia, Canada.
