= McDowell Sonoran Preserve =

Protected area in Maricopa County, Arizona

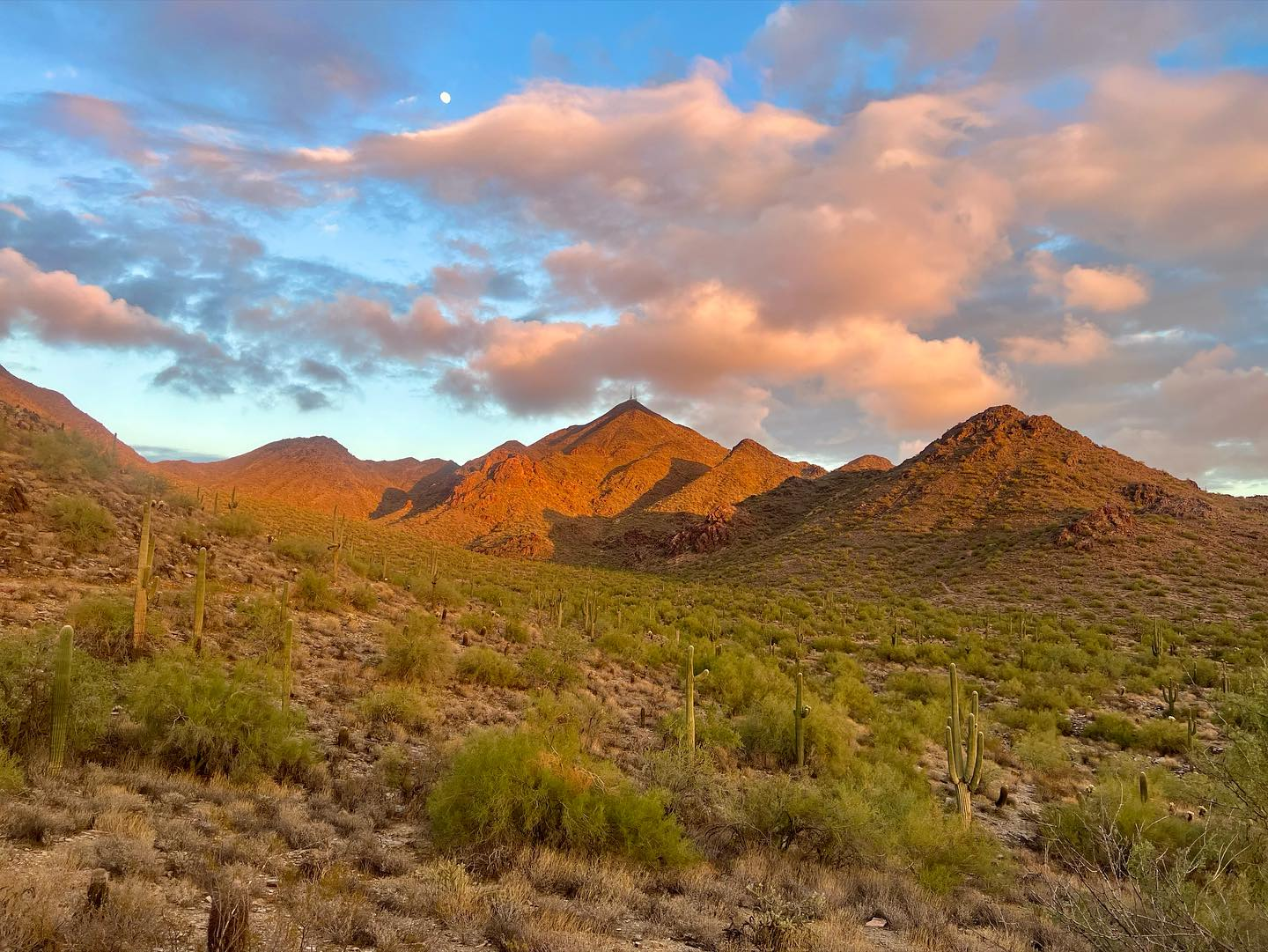
- Thompson Peak from the Bell Pass Trail
- Interactive map of McDowell Sonoran Preserve
- Location: Scottsdale, Arizona
- Coordinates: 33°38′51″N 111°51′41″W
- Area: 30,580 ares (1.181 sq mi)
- Established: October 3, 1994
- Governing body: McDowell Sonoran Conservancy
- Website: https://www.mcdowellsonoran.org/visit-preserve

The Scottsdale McDowell Sonoran Preserve is a large, permanently protected, sustainable desert habitat in Scottsdale, Arizona.

The preserve encompasses some 30,500 acres (12,343 ha) contiguously, and is the largest city park (technically "nature reserve") in the United States. The preserve lands were purchased via a sales tax increment approved by Scottsdale voters, and the preserve is supported in-part by the McDowell Sonoran Conservancy.

== Recreation ==
The preserve has over 180 miles (290 km) of trails. The trailhead gates are open from sunrise to sunset and there is no charge for access or parking.

Popular activities include hiking (guided & self-guided), mountain biking, rock climbing, running, & horseback riding.
