= Arrowhead Mountain (Colorado) =

Mountain in Colorado, United States

Coordinates: 39°30′46.93″N 105°41′28.98″W

Arrowhead Mountain is a 11,218-foot (3,419 m) mountain in Park County, Colorado, United States.
