= Arrowhead Mountain (Vermont) =

Mountain in Vermont, United States

Coordinates: 44°40′13″N 73°07′13″W

Arrowhead Mountain is a 932-foot (284 m) mountain in Chittenden County, Vermont, United States.
