= Arrowhead Mountain (Flathead County, Montana) =

Mountain in Montana, United States

Coordinates: 48°06′27″N 113°11′05″W

Arrowhead Mountain is a 6,897-foot (2,102 m) mountain in Flathead County, Montana, United States.
