= Arrowhead Mountain (California) =

Mountain in California, United States

Arrowhead Mountain is a 978-foot (298 m) mountain between Sonoma and Napa Counties in California, United States. It is part of the Mayacamas Mountains, a subrange of the California Coast Ranges.

== Geography ==
- Elevation: 978.84 ft (298 m)
- Prominence: 365 ft (111 m)
- Isolation: 1.84 mi (2.96 km)
- Coordinates: 38°16′27″N 122°24′00″W
- Topo Map: USGS Sonoma (1:24,000)
- Location Datum: NAVD88, based on LIDAR data

The mountain lies near the boundary of the Moon Mountain District Sonoma County AVA, a federally recognized wine-growing region, and plays a minor role in the AVA’s boundary description.

== Legend ==
According to local legend native american tribes believed that the Arrowhead symbol was placed there by the Great Spirit to guide them to their destined homeland - similar in purpose to the Israiltes' Pillar of Fire. The arrow was said to mark sacred ground near the hot springs below, known for their healing properties. Over time, forest fires have contributed to erosion of the formation.
