= Mistake Peak (Arizona) =

Mountain in Gila County, Arizona

- Location within Arizona

Highest point
- Elevation: 5,930 ft (1,807 m) NGVD 29
- Prominence: 39 metres (128 ft)
- Coordinates: 33°55′03″N 111°09′59″W

Geography
- Location: Gila County, Arizona, U.S.
- Parent range: Sierra Ancha
- Topo map: USGS Picture Mountain

Mistake Peak is a summit in Gila County, in the U.S. state of Arizona. It has an elevation of 5,930 feet (1,807 m) and a prominence of 150 feet (46 m). Mistake Peak was likely so named because it was mistaken by surveyors for another summit. Mistake Peak has been noted for its unusual place name.
