= Pinnacle Peak (Arizona) =

Landform in Maricopa County, Arizona

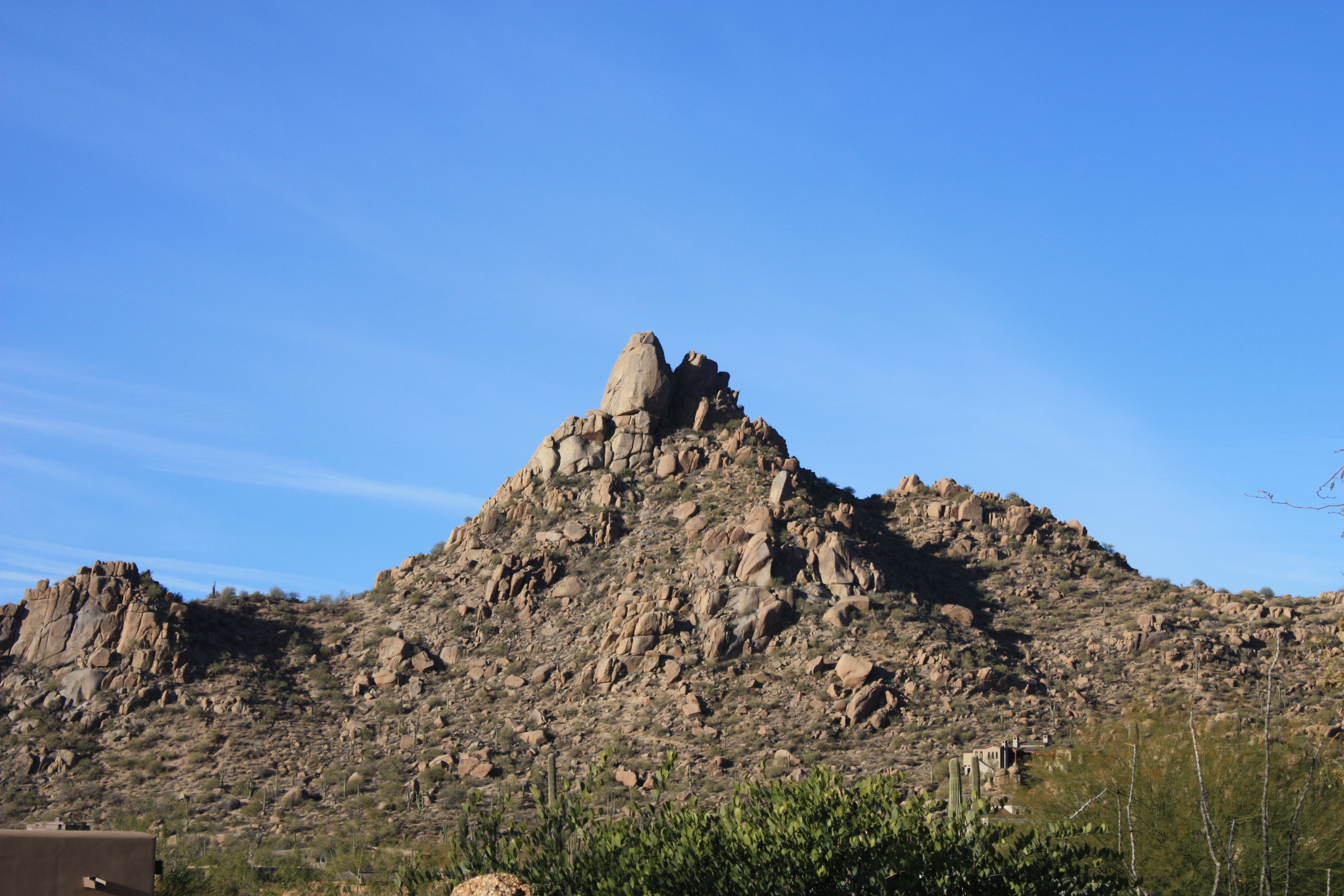

Highest point
- Elevation: 3,169 ft (966 m) NAVD 88
- Prominence: 567 ft (173 m)
- Coordinates: 33°43′32″N 111°52′13″W

Geography
- Location within Arizona Location within the United States
- Location: Scottsdale, Arizona, U.S.
- Topo map(s): USGS, Chico Shunie

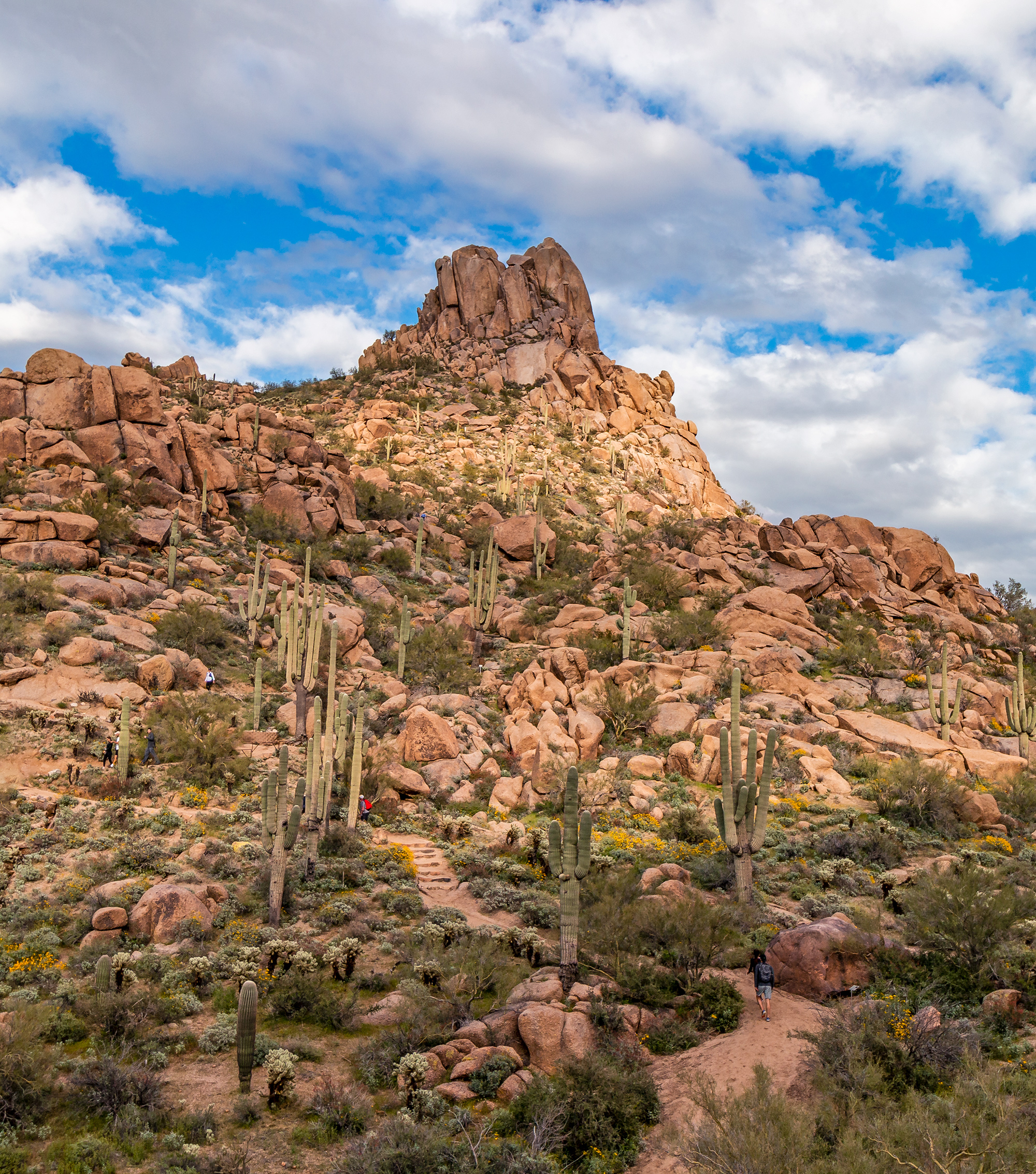
Backside Of Pinnacle Peak In Scottsdale, AZ

Pinnacle Peak is a granite summit located in Scottsdale, Arizona. The peak rises to an elevation of 3,169 feet (966 m). It is located within the 150-acre (61 ha) Pinnacle Peak Park, operated by the City of Scottsdale Park District. Part of the Sonoran Desert, the park is home to a variety of native desert flora and fauna. Hikers utilize a 1.75 mile trail to explore the area, though rock climbing skills are needed to reach the summit.

== History ==
The area around Pinnacle Peak was used by the Hohokam for hunting and food gathering. Later, settlers began to use the area for ranching and mining, with homes gradually being built within sight of Pinnacle Peak.

Pinnacle Peak and its surrounding area became a part of the Arizona State Trust Land. In the 1980s, the area was annexed into Scottsdale and was established as a 185-acre (75 ha) park. In 1994, 35 acres (14 ha) were sold to a housing developer in exchange for the funding and construction of the park's main trail. After being closed for six years due to the development, the park reopened on April 20, 2002.

== Trail ==
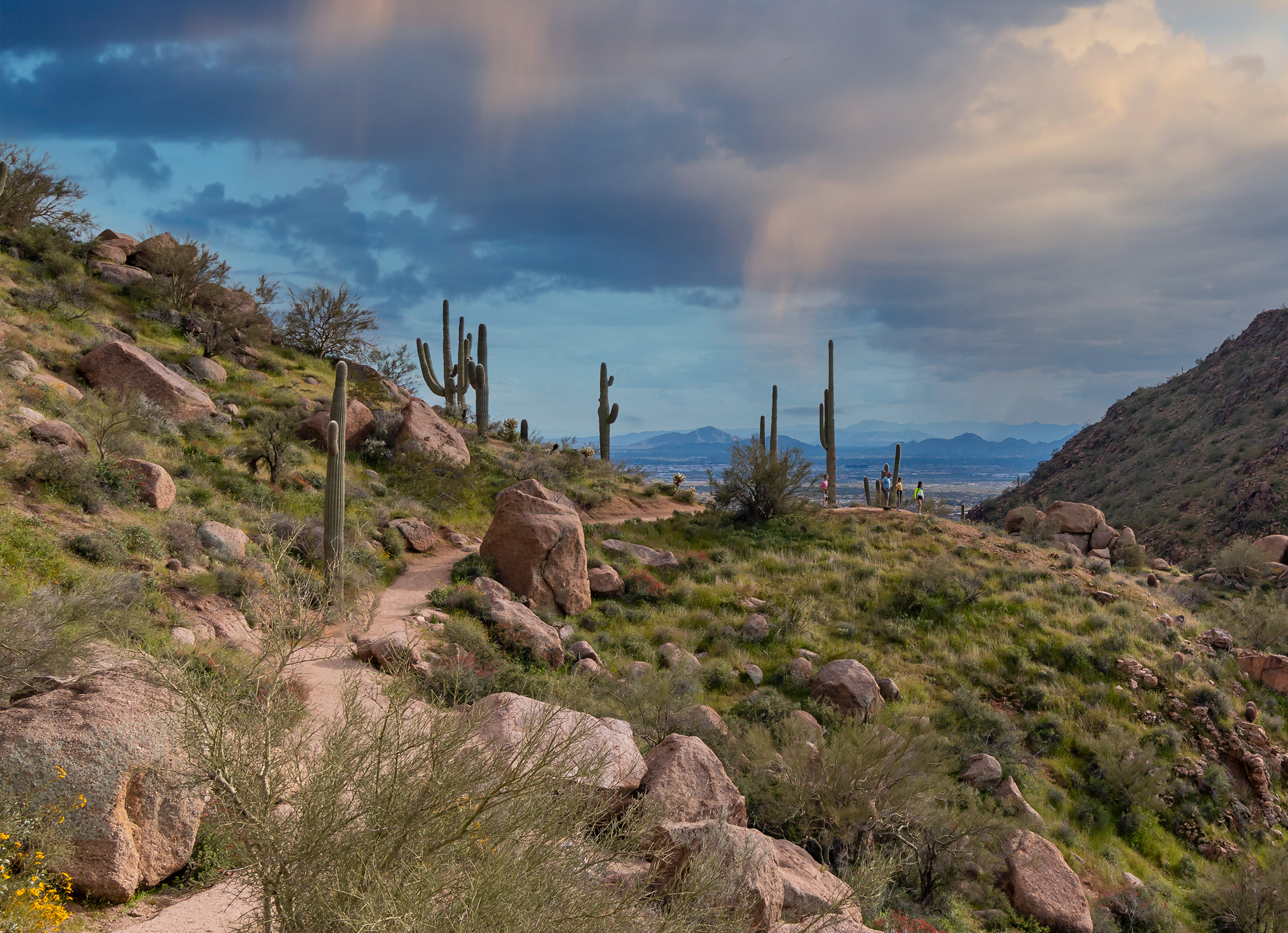
Hikers On Pinnacle Peak Hiking Trail

A 1.75 mile trail leads visitors around the peak. As it is not a loop trail, hikers need to return the way they came, making for a 3.5 mile round trip hike. The park has provided benches along the trail along with mileage and informational signs. The trail utilizes many switchbacks; the elevation at the trailhead is 2,570 feet (783 m), with the lowest point at 2,366 feet (721 m), and the highest point measuring 2,889 feet (881 m). Half a mile from the trail head, the trail opens up to a scenic look-out called "Grandview."

== Summit climb ==
Pinnacle Peak summit is approached from the east side, from a spur of the main trail labeled "rock climbing access". The most popular summit route itself is called the "South Crack". South Crack route is three pitches of trad climbing. All pitches have belay anchors at the top. The summit is flat and has large belay anchors and rap rings. The second and third pitch can be combined into one pitch as the third pitch is very short, and the belay station is somewhat cramped (located between two boulders that form the entrance of a tunnel that extends through to the north side of the peak). When descending, rappel to the right (east) of the second pitch, down a large, flat face to the top of the first pitch. Rappel down the first pitch or downclimb the route.

== Wildlife ==
Pinnacle Peak is home to a diverse variety of wildlife. According to the Scottsdale Park District, the 150-acre (61 ha) park "is an ideal habitat for a variety of native plants such as saguaros, cholla cactus, creosote plants, and for creatures such as bobcats, gila monsters and western diamondback rattlesnakes."

Mammals spotted on Pinnacle Peak include woodrats, mountain lions, coyotes, grey foxes, mule deer, rock squirrels, javelina, and desert cottontail. Reptiles recorded on the peak include gila monsters, desert tortoise, chuckwalla, desert spiny lizards, and a variety of snakes, including western diamondback rattlesnakes, black-tailed rattlesnakes, gopher snakes, common kingsnakes, coral snakes, and coachwhips.

== See also ==
- Scottsdale, Arizona
