= Arrowhead Mountain (Arizona) =

Mountain in Arizona, United States

- Location within Arizona

Highest point
- Elevation: 3,767 ft (1,148 m)
- Coordinates: 33°52′56″N 111°27′54″W

Geography
- Location: Maricopa County, Arizona, U.S.

Arrowhead Mountain is a 3,767-foot (1,148 m) mountain in Arizona, United States.
