= Pinal =

Pinal may refer to:

== People ==
- Silvia Pinal (1931–2024), Mexican actress
- Pinal Shah (born 1987), Indian World Cup wicket-keeper
- Pinal or Pinaleño, a band of the Native American Apache tribe

== Places ==
=== United States ===
- Pinal County, Arizona
  - Pinal City, Arizona, a ghost town in Pinal County
  - Pinal Airpark, a aircraft boneyard
- Pinal, Arizona, a census-designated place in Gila County
- Pinal Mountains, a mountain range in Gila County
  - Pinal Peak, highest point in the range

=== Elsewhere ===
- El Piñal, a former Spanish port in Guangdong, China
- El Piñal, Táchira, Venezuela, a community

== Other uses ==
- Arizona State Route 505, also known as the Pinal North–South Freeway, a planned freeway

== See also ==
- Gerardo de la Riva Pinal (born 1954), Mexican politician
- Pinal de Amoles Municipality, Querétaro, Mexico
  - Pinal de Amoles, a town in the municipality
- Battle of the Pinal Mountains, a 1788 minor battle between Apaches and Spanish colonists
