= List of counties in Arizona =

Counties of Arizona
- Category: Federal Unit
- Location: State of Arizona
- Number: 15
- Populations: 9,312 (Greenlee) – 4,689,558 (Maricopa)
- Areas: 1,238 square miles (3,210 km^{2}) (Santa Cruz) – 18,661 square miles (48,330 km^{2}) (Coconino)
- Government: County government
- Subdivisions: Cities, towns, unincorporated communities, census-designated places

There are 15 counties in the U.S. state of Arizona. Four counties (Mohave, Pima, Yavapai and Yuma) were created in 1864 following the organization of the Arizona Territory in 1862. The later defunct Pah-Ute County was split from Mohave County in 1865, but merged back in 1871. All but La Paz County were created by the time Arizona was granted statehood in 1912. La Paz County was established in 1983 after many years of pushing for independence from Yuma County.

Eight of Arizona's fifteen counties are named after Native American groups that are resident in parts of Arizona, with another (Cochise County) being named after a native leader. Four other counties, Gila County, Santa Cruz County, Pinal County, and Graham County, are named for features of Arizona's landscape: the Gila River, the Santa Cruz River, Pinal Peak, and Mount Graham, respectively. Another county, La Paz County, is named after a former settlement, while the final county, Greenlee County, is named after one of the state's early pioneers.

Under Arizona laws, a county shall not be formed or divided by county initiative unless each proposed county would have all of these characteristics: (1) at least three-fourths of one percent of the total state assessed valuation and at least the statewide per capita assessed valuation; (2) a population of at least three-fourths of one percent of the total state population according to the most recent United States decennial census; (3) at least one hundred square miles of privately owned land; (4) common boundaries with either (a) at least three other existing or proposed counties; or (b) at least two other existing or proposed counties and the state boundary. A county commission must be formed to evaluate the feasibility of the proposed county. A proposal to divide a county must be approved by a majority of the votes cast in each proposed new county.

Under the Arizona Constitution, counties are politically and legally creatures of the state, and do not have their own charters. Counties are governed by boards of supervisors which act with executive authority for the county within the statutes and powers prescribed by Arizona state law. With few exceptions, these powers are narrowly construed. The state legislature devotes considerable time to local matters, with limited discretion granted to the Board of Supervisors on minor ordinance, zoning, and revenue collection issues.

Arizona's postal abbreviation is AZ and its FIPS code is 04.

== Alphabetical listing ==
County	FIPS code	County seat	Est.	Formed from	Etymology	Population	Area	Map
Apache County	001	St. Johns	February 14, 1879	Yavapai County	The Apache (Ndee) people. Apache is an exonym from Zuni ʔapaču "Navajos" or Yavapai ʔpačə "enemy".	64,445	11,218 sq mi (29,054 km^{2})	State map highlighting Apache County
Cochise County	003	Bisbee	February 1, 1881	Pima County	Cochise (1805-1874), a Chiricahua Apache chief and leader of an 1861 uprising. Cochise is an anglicisation of K'uu-ch'ish "oak".	126,332	6,219 sq mi (16,107 km^{2})	State map highlighting Cochise County
Coconino County	005	Flagstaff	February 19, 1891	Yavapai County	Coconino is a former designation for the Havasupai, Hualapai, and/or Yavapai, derived from the Hopi exonym Kohonino.	144,368	18,661 sq mi (48,332 km^{2})	State map highlighting Coconino County
Gila County	007	Globe	February 8, 1881	Maricopa and Pinal Counties	The Gila River, a tributary of the Colorado. Possibly from Apache dzil "mountain," via Spanish Xila.	53,801	4,796 sq mi (12,422 km^{2})	State map highlighting Gila County
Graham County	009	Safford	March 10, 1881	Apache and Pima Counties	Mount Graham, in the Pinaleños. Mt. Graham itself is named for topographical engineer James Duncan Graham (1799-1865).	40,157	4,641 sq mi (12,020 km^{2})	State map highlighting Graham County
Greenlee County	011	Clifton	March 10, 1909	Graham County	Mason Greenlee (1835-1903), early prospector. Named by an amendment initially intended to delay the bill creating "Lincoln County".	9,312	1,848 sq mi (4,786 km^{2})	State map highlighting Greenlee County
La Paz County	012	Parker	April 27, 1983	Yuma County	La Paz, Arizona, a historic boomtown on the Colorado River. A common placename, La Paz means "The Peace" in Spanish.	16,711	4,513 sq mi (11,689 km^{2})	State map highlighting La Paz County
Maricopa County	013	Phoenix	February 14, 1871	Pima and Yavapai Counties	The Maricopa (Piipaash) people. First attested in Spanish as Cocomaricopa, no origin or meaning is definitively known.	4,689,558	9,224 sq mi (23,890 km^{2})	State map highlighting Maricopa County
Mohave County	015	Kingman	November 10, 1864	—	The Mohave (Aha Makhav) people. The Mohave endonym means "along the water," referring to the Colorado.	228,102	13,470 sq mi (34,887 km^{2})	State map highlighting Mohave County
Navajo County	017	Holbrook	March 21, 1895	Apache County	The Navajo (Diné) people. Navajo is an exonym from Tewa Navahu "big field," referring to the San Juan River Valley	109,946	9,959 sq mi (25,794 km^{2})	State map highlighting Navajo County
Pima County	019	Tucson	November 10, 1864	—	The Pima (Akimel O'odham) people. Pima is a Spanish exonym from the O'odham phrase pi mac "(I) don't know," presumably heard during initial encounters.	1,074,685	9,189 sq mi (23,799 km^{2})	State map highlighting Pima County
Pinal County	021	Florence	February 1, 1875	Maricopa and Pima counties	Pinal Peak, possibly from Spanish pinal "place of pines". Pinal Peak is within the borders of Gila County.	539,380	5,374 sq mi (13,919 km^{2})	State map highlighting Pinal County
Santa Cruz County	023	Nogales	March 15, 1899	Cochise and Pima counties	Santa Cruz River, a tributary of the Gila. A common placename, Santa Cruz means "Holy Cross" in Spanish.	50,020	1,238 sq mi (3,206 km^{2})	State map highlighting Santa Cruz County
Yavapai County	025	Prescott	November 10, 1864	—	The Yavapai people. The Yavapé are one of four major Yavapai bands.	252,552	8,128 sq mi (21,051 km^{2})	State map highlighting Yavapai County
Yuma County	027	Yuma	November 10, 1864	—	Yuma is a former name of the Quechan people, derived from the O'odham exonym Yumĭ.	224,449	5,519 sq mi (14,294 km^{2})	State map highlighting Yuma County

== Racial / Ethnic Profile of counties in Arizona (2020 Census) ==
Racial / Ethnic Profile of counties in Arizona (2020 Census)
Following is a table of counties in Arizona by race/ethnicity. The majority racial/ethnic group is coded per the key below.

Majority minority with no dominant group
Majority White
Majority Black
Majority Hispanic
Majority Asian
Majority Native American

Racial and ethnic composition of counties in Arizona (2020 Census) (NH = Non-Hispanic) Note: the US Census treats Hispanic/Latino as an ethnic category. This table excludes Latinos from the racial categories and assigns them to a separate category. Hispanics/Latinos may be of any race.
County	Location of County	Total Population	White alone (NH)	%	Black or African American alone (NH)	%	Native American or Alaska Native alone (NH)	%	Asian alone (NH)	%	Pacific Islander alone (NH)	%	Other race alone (NH)	%	Mixed race or Multiracial (NH)	%	Hispanic or Latino (any race)	%
Apache		66,021	13,791	20.89%	184	0.28%	46,509	70.45%	307	0.47%	18	0.03%	115	0.17%	1,236	1.87%	3,861	5.85%
Cochise		125,447	68,256	54.41%	4,371	3.48%	762	0.61%	2,587	2.06%	421	0.34%	725	0.58%	5,710	4.55%	42,615	33.97%
Coconino		145,101	76,904	53.00%	1,777	1.22%	35,143	24.22%	2,582	1.78%	254	0.18%	616	0.42%	6,106	4.21%	21,719	14.97%
Gila		53,272	32,757	61.49%	239	0.45%	8,655	16.25%	427	0.80%	45	0.08%	203	0.38%	1,663	3.12%	9,283	17.43%
Graham		38,533	20,398	52.94%	453	1.18%	5,143	13.35%	169	0.44%	16	0.04%	102	0.26%	824	2.14%	11,428	29.66%
Greenlee		9,563	4,446	46.49%	80	0.84%	275	2.88%	68	0.71%	1	0.01%	34	0.36%	283	2.96%	4,376	45.76%
La Paz		16,557	9,061	54.73%	102	0.62%	2,354	14.22%	111	0.67%	41	0.25%	43	0.26%	648	3.91%	4,197	25.35%
Maricopa		4,420,568	2,357,571	53.33%	245,239	5.55%	68,353	1.55%	197,910	4.48%	9,579	0.22%	20,693	0.47%	169,808	3.84%	1,351,415	30.57%
Mohave		213,267	160,165	75.10%	2,063	0.97%	4,053	1.90%	2,600	1.22%	365	0.17%	690	0.32%	9,205	4.32%	34,126	16.00%
Navajo		106,717	44,786	41.97%	674	0.63%	46,572	43.64%	548	0.51%	68	0.06%	232	0.22%	2,950	2.76%	10,887	10.20%
Pima		1,043,433	536,868	51.45%	36,254	3.47%	23,670	2.27%	29,844	2.86%	1,937	0.19%	4,657	0.45%	37,415	3.59%	372,788	35.73%
Pinal		425,264	240,006	56.44%	20,712	4.87%	17,156	4.03%	6,290	1.48%	1,081	0.25%	1,658	0.39%	16,828	3.96%	121,533	28.58%
Santa Cruz		47,669	7,119	14.93%	114	0.24%	78	0.16%	271	0.57%	13	0.03%	150	0.31%	292	0.61%	39,632	83.14%
Yavapai		236,209	183,296	77.60%	1,415	0.60%	3,319	1.41%	2,802	1.19%	269	0.11%	1,071	0.45%	9,647	4.08%	34,390	14.56%
Yuma		203,881	61,123	29.98%	3,484	1.71%	1,888	0.93%	2,321	1.14%	215	0.11%	622	0.31%	4,225	2.07%	130,003	63.76%

== Former counties ==
- Pah-Ute County, Arizona Territory (1865–1871), now part of Clark County, Nevada and Mohave County, Arizona

== New Mexico counties that once covered Arizona ==
Counties of the Territory of New Mexico, 1852.

- Doña Ana County, New Mexico Territory
- Rio Arriba County, New Mexico Territory
- Santa Ana County, New Mexico Territory
- Socorro County, New Mexico Territory
- Taos County, New Mexico Territory
- Valencia County, New Mexico Territory

== Proposed counties ==
- Butte County: In 1897, James C. Goodwin, with the support of Charles T. Hayden and others, introduced a bill at the Territorial Legislature to split Maricopa County into two, with Tempe being the county seat. There have also been proposals, introduced in 1900 and 1913, to divide Maricopa County, with Mesa as the new county's seat.
- Sierra Bonita County: proposed at the 13th Arizona Territorial Legislature in 1885, with Willcox proposed as the county seat. The proposal died by one vote.
- Hohokam County, Mogollon County, and O'dham County proposed in 2022 as split offs from Maricopa County.

== Fictional counties ==
- Bannon County: The fictional Bannon County, Arizona, is mentioned in the 1980 science fiction action film Hangar 18 as the place where an alien spacecraft had landed.
- Mariposa County: Served as the stand-in for Maricopa County in television series Medium.
- Carburetor County: A fictional county in the movie Cars along Route 66

== See also ==
- Arizona Association of Counties
