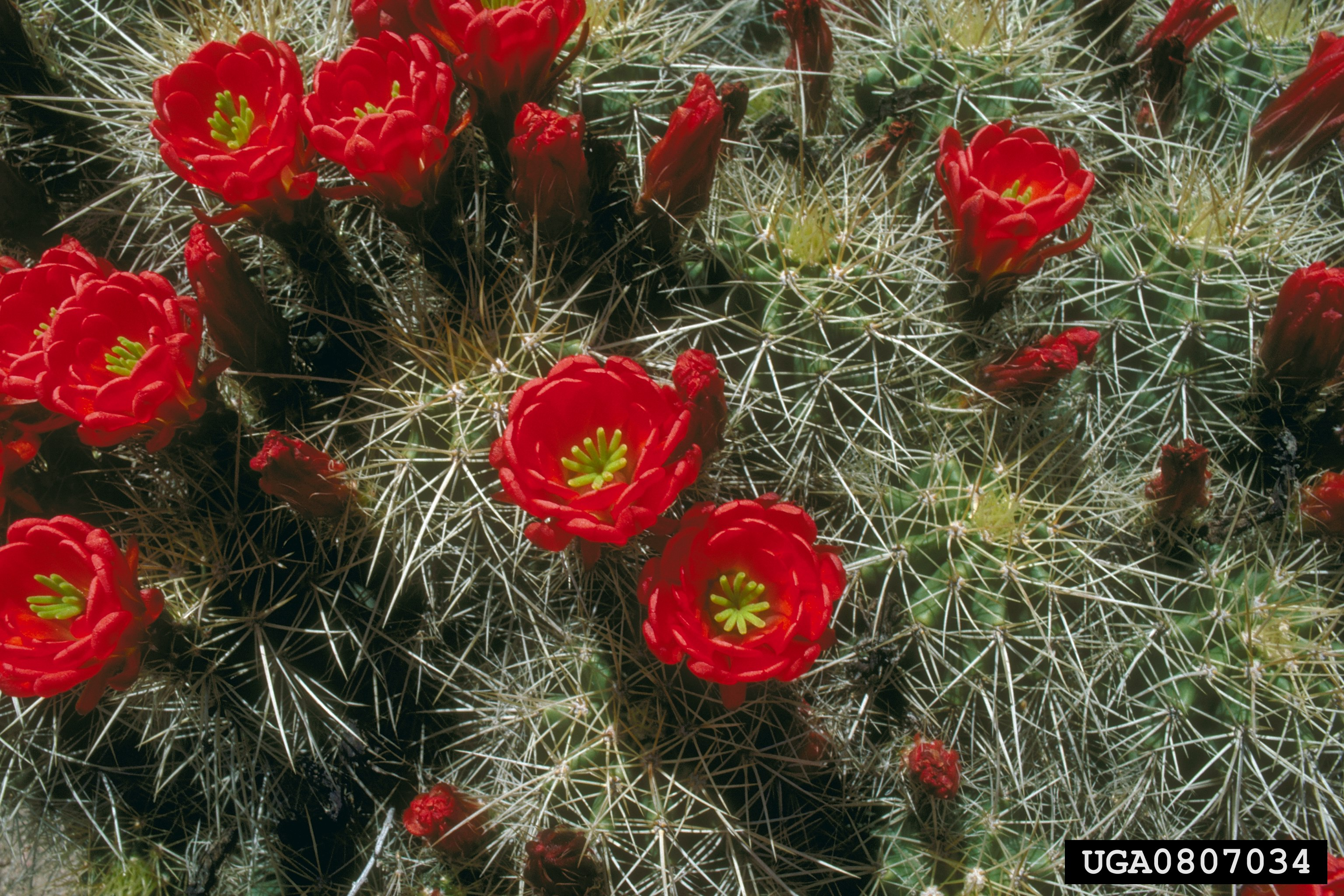

Conservation status
- Secure (NatureServe)

- Least Concern (IUCN 3.1)

Scientific classification
- Kingdom: Plantae
- Clade: Tracheophytes
- Clade: Angiosperms
- Clade: Eudicots
- Order: Caryophyllales
- Family: Cactaceae
- Subfamily: Cactoideae
- Genus: Echinocereus
- Species: E. triglochidiatus

Binomial name
- Echinocereus triglochidiatus Engelm.

Synonyms
- List: Cereus triglochidiatus (Engelm.) Engelm. 1849; Echinocereus paucispinus var. triglochidiatus (Engelm.) K.Schum. 1898; subsp mojavensis; Echinocereus mojavensis (Engelm. & J.M.Bigelow) Engelm. ex Rümpler 1886; Echinocereus triglochidiatus var. mojavensis (Engelm. & J.M.Bigelow) L.D.Benson 1944; Cereus bigelovii Engelm. 1857; Cereus mohavensis S.Watson 1878; Cereus mojavensis var. zuniensis Engelm. 1856; Echinocereus mojavensis var. zuniensis (Engelm.) Rümpler 1886; Echinocereus sandersi Orcutt 1926; subsp. triglochidiatus; Cereus gonacanthus Engelm. & J.M.Bigelow 1857 publ. 1856; Cereus hexaedrus Engelm. & J.M.Bigelow 1857 publ. 1856; Cereus octacanthus (Muehlenpf.) J.M.Coult. 1896; Cereus roemeri Engelm. 1849; Echinocereus coccineus var. octacanthus (Muehlenpf.) Boissev. 1940; Echinocereus gonacanthus (Engelm. & J.M.Bigelow) Lem. 1868; Echinocereus octacanthus (Muehlenpf.) Britton & Rose 1922; Echinocereus paucispinus var. gonacanthus (Engelm. & J.M.Bigelow) K.Schum. 1898; Echinocereus paucispinus var. hexaedrus (Engelm. & J.M.Bigelow) K.Schum. 1898; Echinocereus triglochidiatus var. gonacanthus (Engelm. & J.M.Bigelow) Boissev. 1940; Echinocereus triglochidiatus var. hexaedrus (Engelm. & J.M.Bigelow) Boissev. 1940; Echinopsis octacantha Muehlenpf. 1848

= Echinocereus triglochidiatus =

Species of cactus

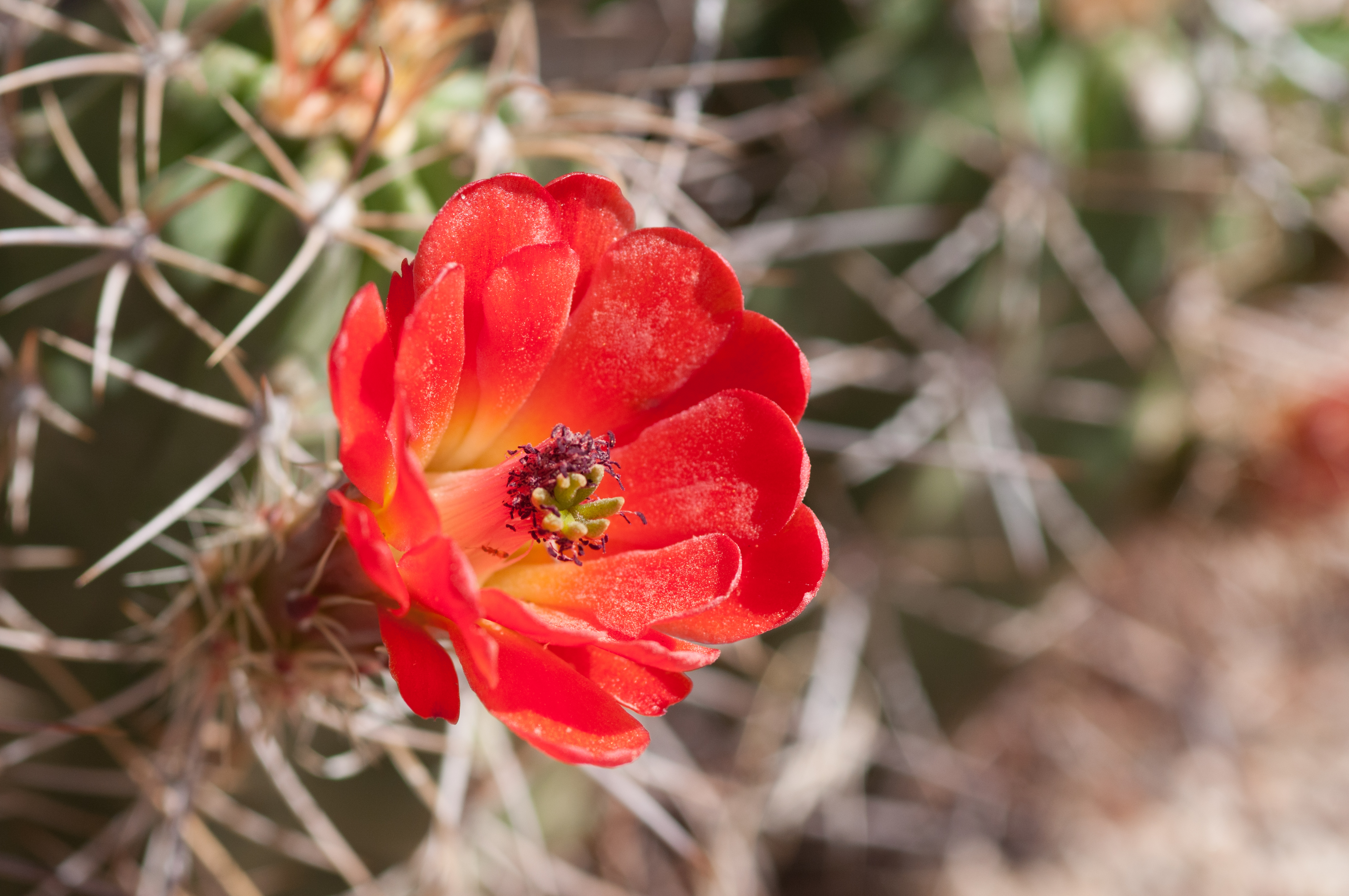
Close-up of Echinocereus triglochidiatus flower; Joshua Tree National Park, California

Echinocereus triglochidiatus is a species of hedgehog cactus known by several common names, including kingcup cactus, claret cup cactus, red-flowered hedgehog cactus and Mojave mound cactus. This cactus is native to the southwestern United States and northern Mexico, where it is a resident of varied habitats from low desert to rocky slopes, scrub, and mountain woodland. E. triglochidiatus is the official state cactus of Colorado.

== Description ==
A number of varieties of this highly variable cactus species are known, but not all are universally recognized. In general, it is a mounding cactus, forming bulbous piles of spherical to light to bluish green cylindrical stems, forming cushions over 1 meter in diameter with up to 500 shoots. Stems range from 5 to 40 cm long and 5 to 15 cm in diameter with five to twelve ribs that are either straight-edged or tuberculated. It is densely spiny and somewhat woolly. The one to four central spines are similar to the peripheral spines, with up to 22 round or flattened, yellow to dark marginal spines that can be 1 to 7 cm long, though some may be absent. The showy flower is a funnel-shaped bloom up to 8–9 cm (3.1–3.5 inches) wide and bright scarlet red to orange-red tepals. A thick nectar chamber and many thready pink stamens are at the center of the corolla. The fruits are spherical to obovate, slightly pink or reddish, and lose their thorns over time. The chromosome count is 2n = 22.

=== Subspecies ===
There are two recognized subspecies:

Image	Scientific name	Distribution
	Echinocereus triglochidiatus subsp. mojavensis (Engelm. & J.M.Bigelow) W.Blum & Mich.Lange	Arizona, California, Colorado, Nevada, Utah, Mexico (Baja California)
	Echinocereus triglochidiatus subsp. triglochidiatus	Arizona, Colorado, New Mexico

== Taxonomy ==
The kingcup cactus's taxonomy is a topic of contention. Varieties of the E. triglochidiatus often vary dramatically in their stems and spines, with closely related combinations producing radically different looking plants. Many varieties have little or no documented natural occurrences, but were observed in cultivation.

Plants in the western portion of the range of E. triglochidiatus were formerly considered E. triglochidiatus var. mojavensis. This taxon included both the California curly-spined plants and the straight-spined plants that reside in Arizona, Utah, and western Colorado. The straight-spined varieties were called E. triglochidiatus var. melanacanthus. Those in the eastern portion of the distribution were called E. triglochidiatus var. triglochidiatus. They have fewer and larger spines. These varieties became their own distinct subspecies, and only the E. triglochidiatus var. triglochidiatus is a recognized variant.

One variety, E. t. arizonicus or the Arizona Hedgehog cactus, is federally listed as an endangered species in the United States. It is limited to the intersection of Arizona and New Mexico in the United States with Mexico. This variety is sometimes included within Echinocereus coccineus. Conversely, the Integrated Taxonomic Information System lists the variety as its own species, Echinocereus arizonicus.

== Distribution ==
All the varieties of the E. triglochidiatus can be found in the Southwestern United States. It lives in various upland, mountain, and desert climates throughout Arizona, New Mexico, Colorado, California, Texas and Northern Mexico at elevations between 150 and 3500 meters.

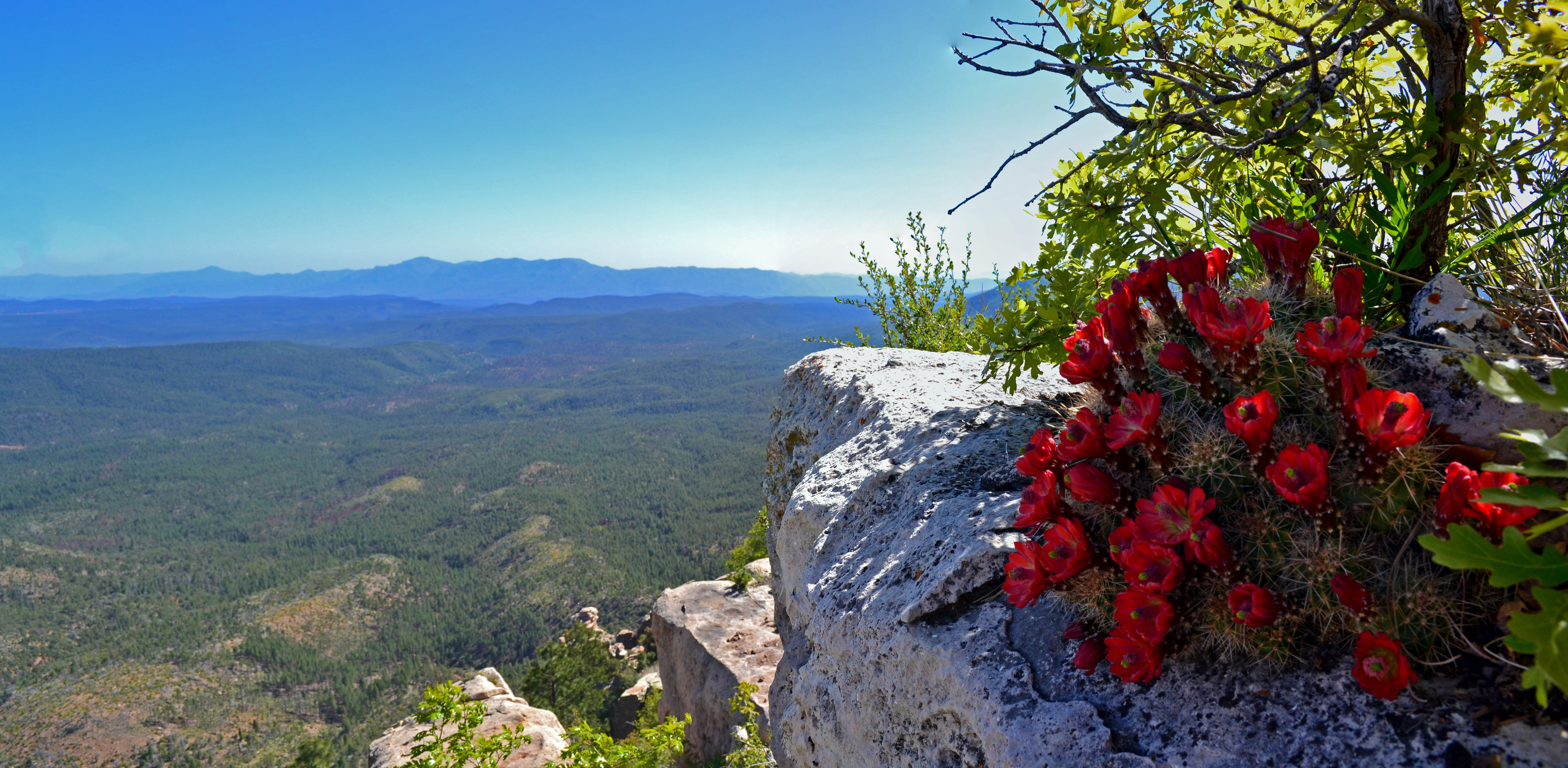
Plant growing in Mogollon Rim, Arizona

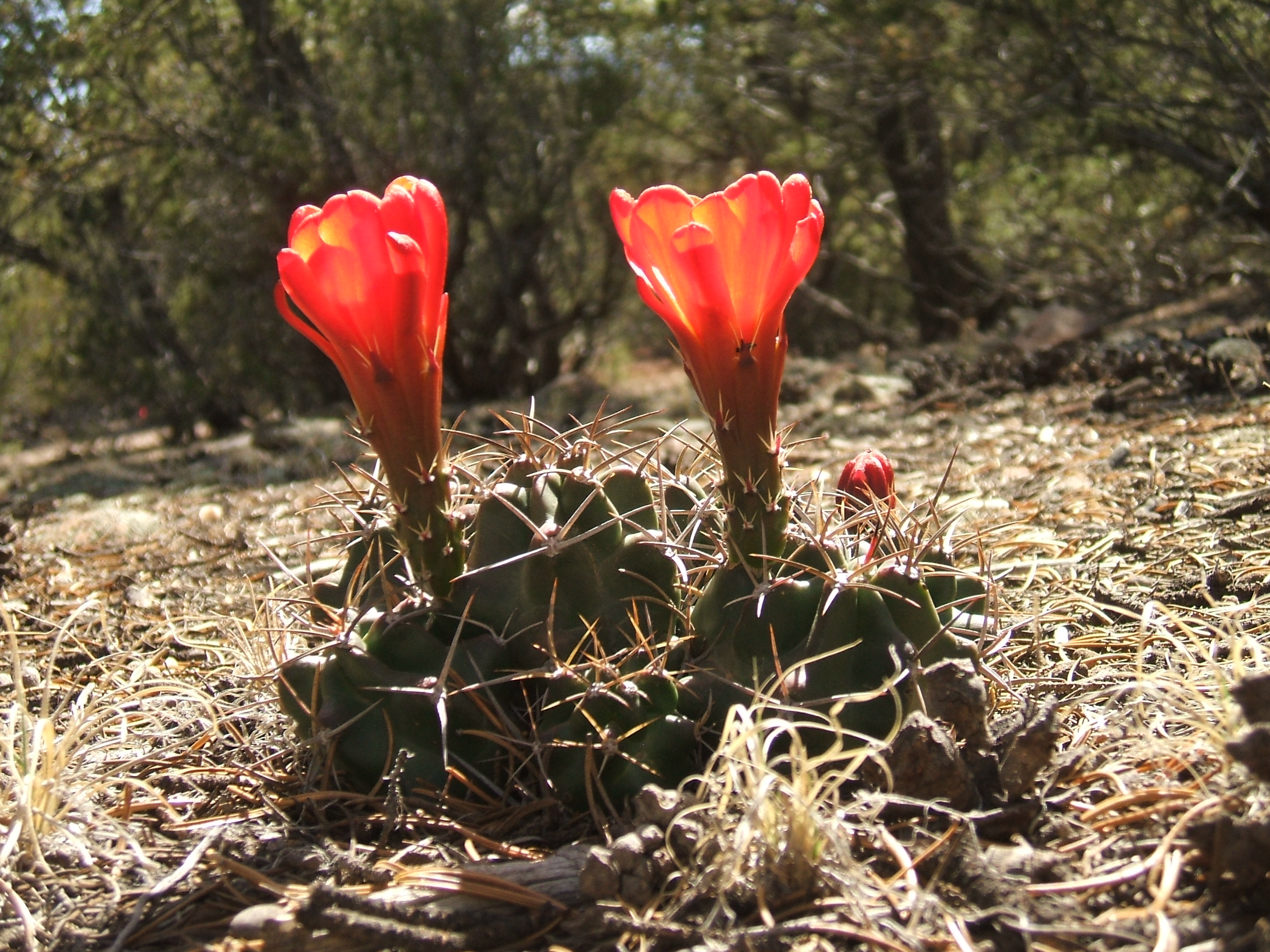
Plant growing in San Miguel County, New Mexico

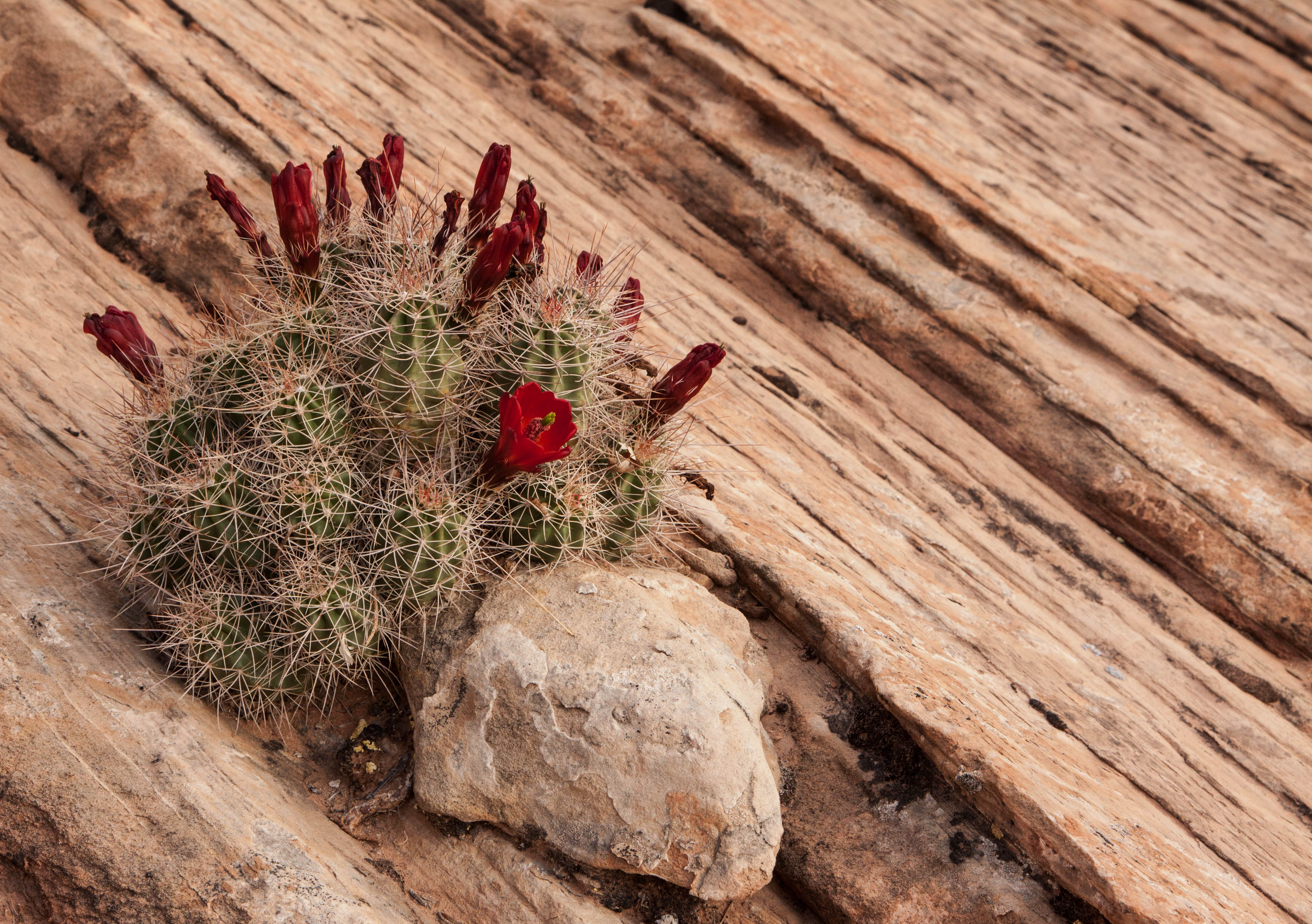
Plant habitat in Grand Junction, Colorado

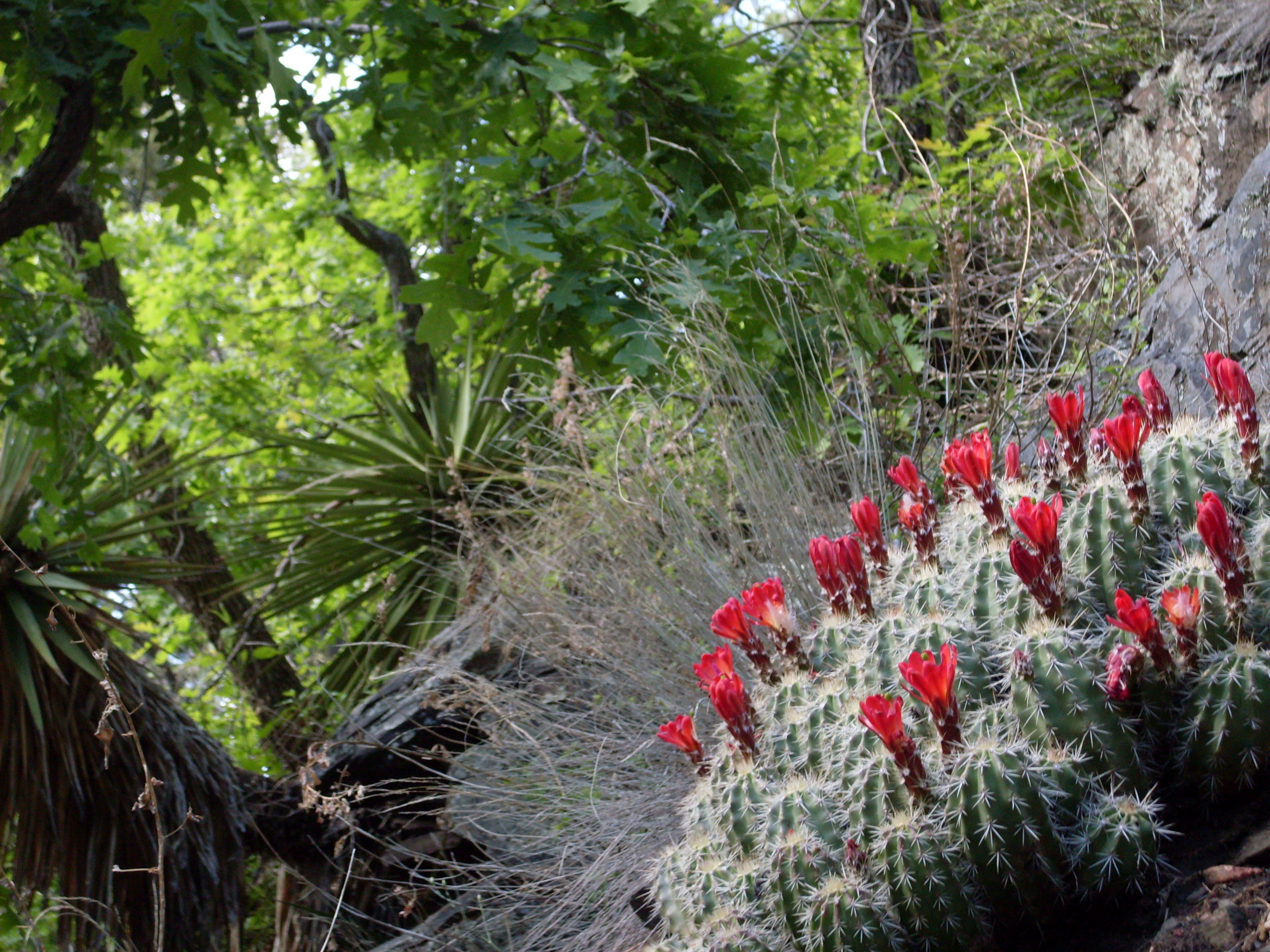
Plant habitat in Butterfly trail, Santa Catalina Mountains, Arizona.

== Etymology ==
The name comes from the Greek tri- and glochidium, meaning "three glochids."

== Ecology ==
Although it is favored by hummingbirds for pollination, its flowers are not specialized for hummingbird pollination, and it is pollinated by bees as well.

Seeds are dispersed from the fruits of mature plants. While ants occasionally take fruit to their mounds, leaving seeds above to sprout - feeding by rodents and lagomorphs are the most common means of dispersal. New sprouts of the cactus thrive under the shade of the fourwing saltbush, which provides protection from animals and desiccation. New growth of E. triglochidiatus is clustered around very old specimens, atop the remains of the saltbushes that served as a nursery. Rodents occasionally kill the plants by digging nests underneath, destroying roots.
