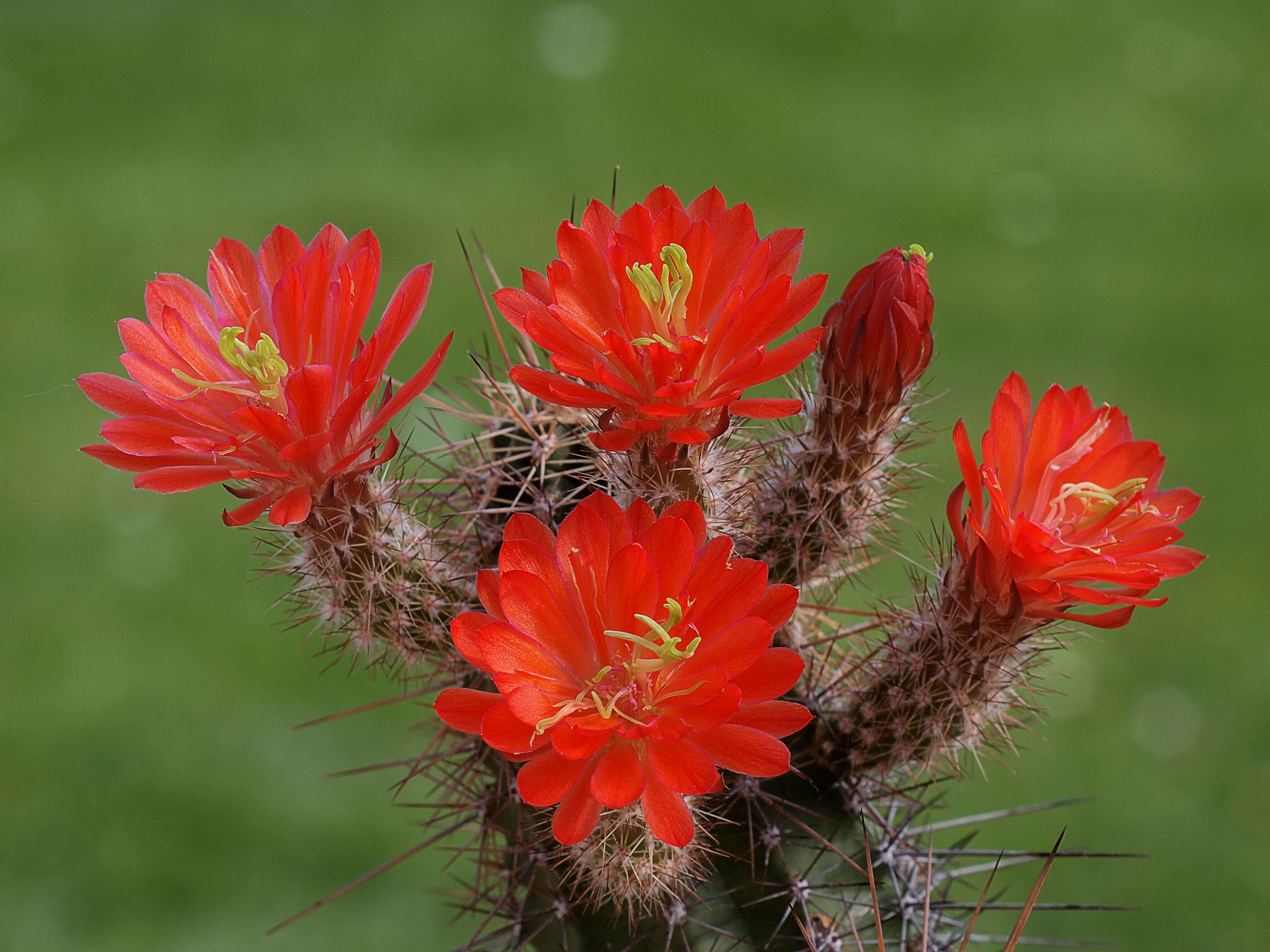

Conservation status
- Least Concern (IUCN 3.1)

- Secure (NatureServe)

Scientific classification
- Kingdom: Plantae
- Clade: Embryophytes
- Clade: Tracheophytes
- Clade: Spermatophytes
- Clade: Angiosperms
- Clade: Eudicots
- Order: Caryophyllales
- Family: Cactaceae
- Subfamily: Cactoideae
- Genus: Echinocereus
- Species: E. coccineus

Binomial name
- Echinocereus coccineus Engelm.

Synonyms
- Cereus aggregatus J.M.Coult.; Cereus coccineus (Engelm.) Engelm.; Cereus phoeniceus Engelm.; Echinocereus aggregatus Rydb.; Echinocereus coccineus subsp. aggregatus W.Blum, Mich.Lange & Rutow; Echinocereus phoeniceus (Engelm.) Lem.; Echinocereus triglochidiatus subsp. coccineus (Engelm.) U.Guzmán; Echinocereus triglochidiatus var. coccineus (Engelm.) W.T.Marshall & T.M.Bock

= Echinocereus coccineus =

Species of plant

Echinocereus coccineus (scarlet hedgehog cactus) is a species of hedgehog cactus. It is native to Northern and Central America. It grows on full sun, in sandy or rocky well-drained soil. It can survive in hardiness zones 5-9.

== Description ==
The usually branched plant forms small mounds that consist of around 30 stem clumps and can reach a diameter of up to one meter. The light green plant body is egg-shaped to cylindrical and reaches heights of up to 40 centimeters with a diameter of 2.5 to 5 centimeters. The 11 to 14 ribs often form warts. The spines are yellow to blackish red. The 4 to 7 central spines, which can also be missing, have an angular cross section and are up to 7 centimeters long. The middle one is often flattened. The 5 to 20 radial spines are round at the base 1-4 cm long. It blooms in late spring to early summer. The flowers are usually red, yellow, pink, purple or white. The broad, funnel-shaped, orange-red flowers appear below the shoot tip and are sometimes dioecious. They are 3 to 10 centimeters long and have a diameter of 2.5 to 8 centimeters. After blooms, it has edible spherical fruits turn red and have falling thorns. Chromosome count is 4n=22.

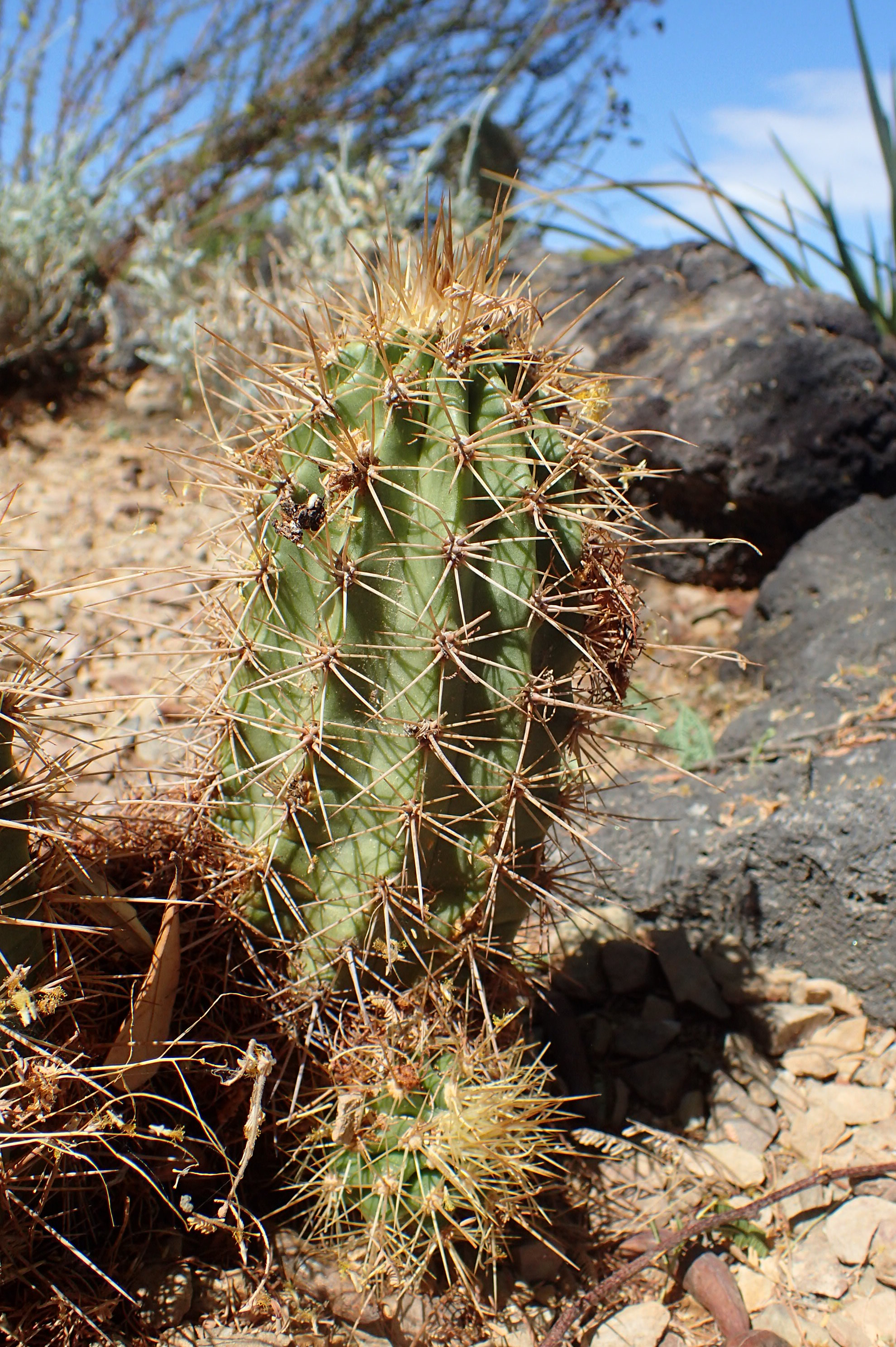
Plant

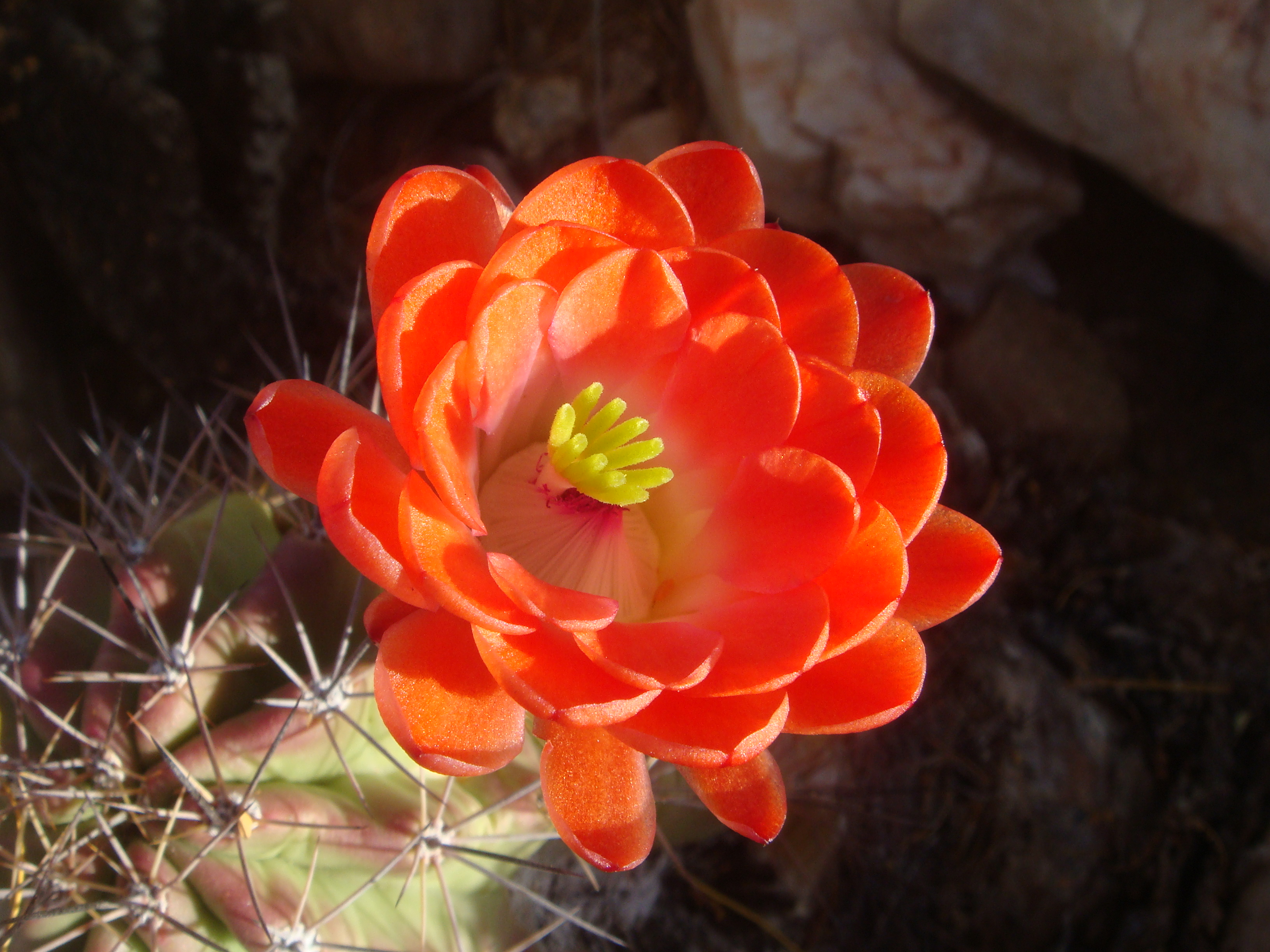
Flower

=== Subspecies ===
Accepted subspecies:

Image	Name	Distribution
	Echinocereus coccineus subsp. coccineus	Colorado to New Mexico.
	Echinocereus coccineus subsp. paucispinus (Engelm.) W.Blum, Mich.Lange & Rutow	W. Texas to Mexico (N. Coahuila)
	Echinocereus coccineus subsp. roemeri (Muehlenpf.) W.Blum, Mich.Lange & Rutow	Texas.
	Echinocereus coccineus subsp. rosei (Wooton & Standl.) W.Blum & Rutow	S. Central U.S.A. to NE. Mexico
	Echinocereus coccineus subsp. transpecosensis W.Blum, Oldach & J.Oldach	S. Central U.S.A. to NE. Mexico.

== Distribution ==
Echinocereus coccineus is distributed in the southern US states of Colorado, Arizona, New Mexico, and western Texas, as well as south through the Sonoran Desert to the Mexican states of Coahuila and Chihuahua at elevations of 685 to 1775 meters.

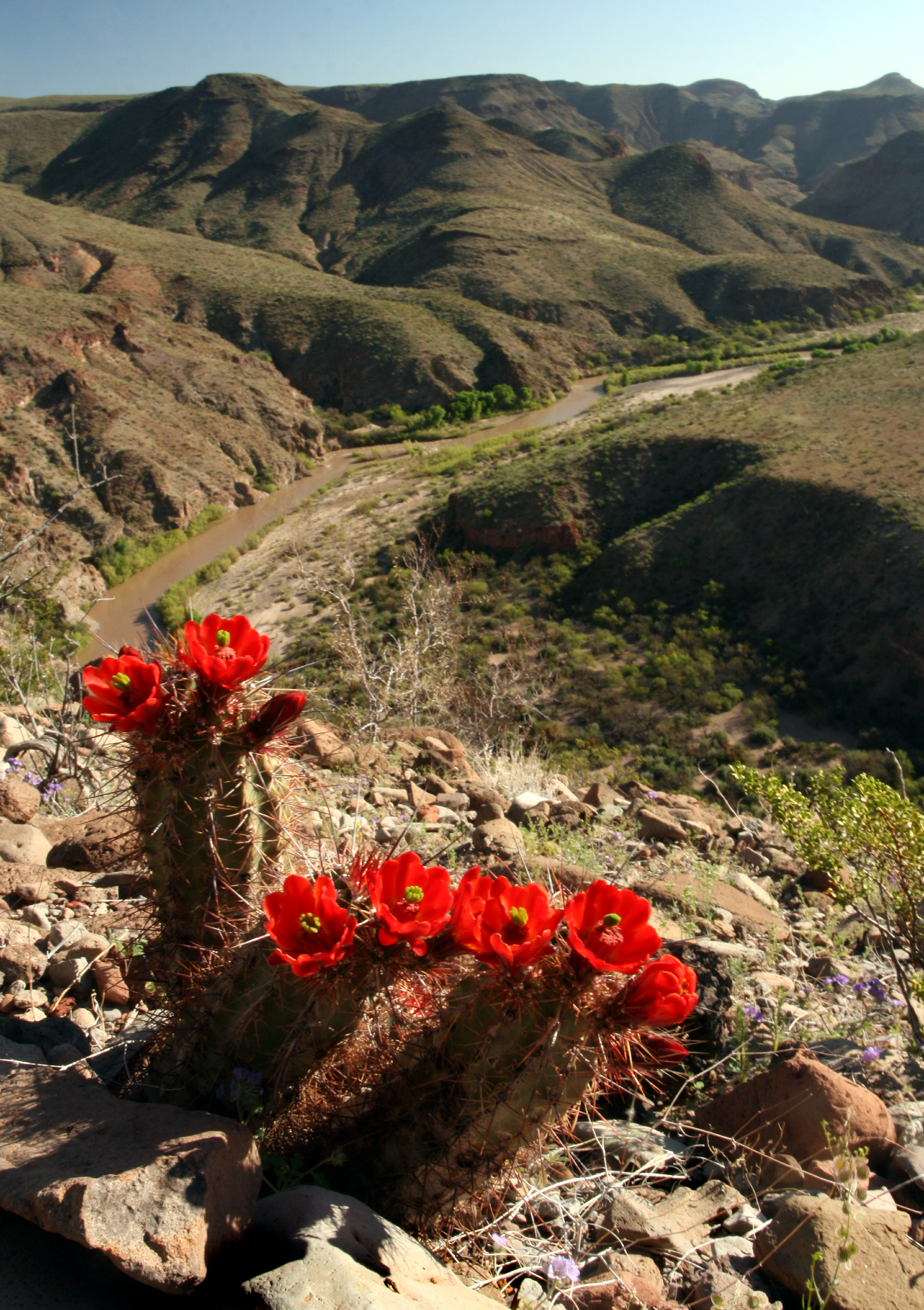
Plant growing in Gila Box Riparian National Conservation Area

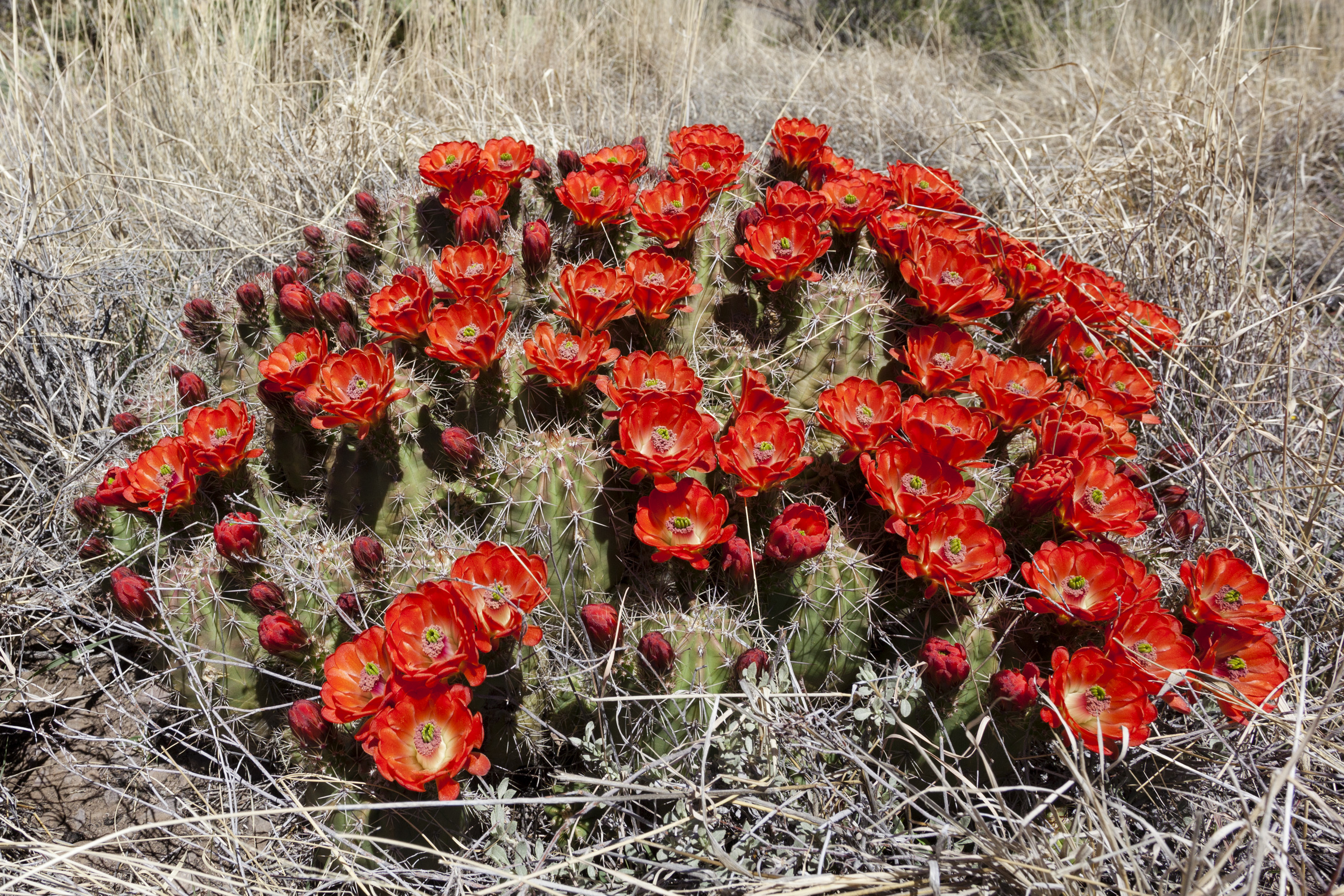
Plant growing in Doña Ana County, New Mexico

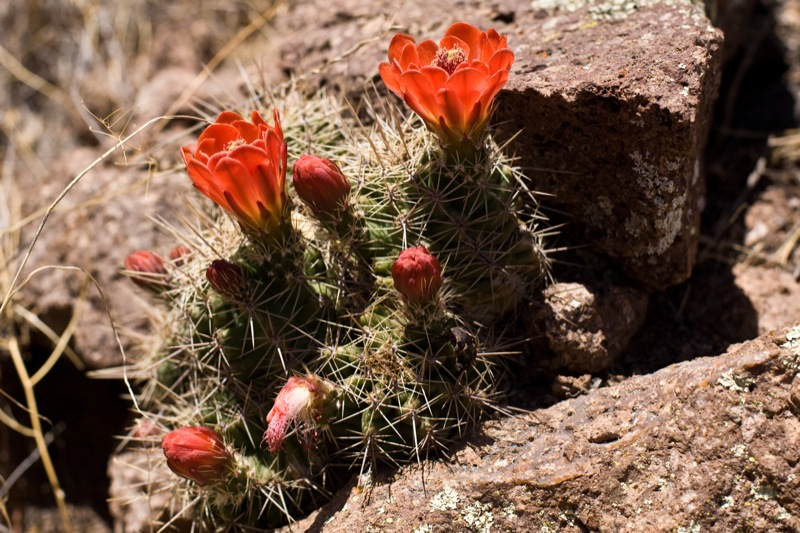
Plant growing in Davis Mountains, Texas

== Taxonomy ==
The first description by George Engelmann was published in 1848. The specific epithet coccineus comes from Latin, means 'dark red' and refers to the color of the flowers of the species. Echinocereus coccineus is closely related to Echinocereus triglochidiatus. Many hybrids between species are known.

Nomenclature synonyms are Cereus coccineus (Engelm.) Engelm. (1848, nom. illegal ICBN article 53.1), Echinocereus triglochidiatus var. coccineus (Engelm.) W.T.Marshall (1941) and Echinocereus triglochidiatus subsp. coccineus (Engelm.) U.Guzmán (2003).
