= Pinal Mountains =

Landform in Gila County, Arizona

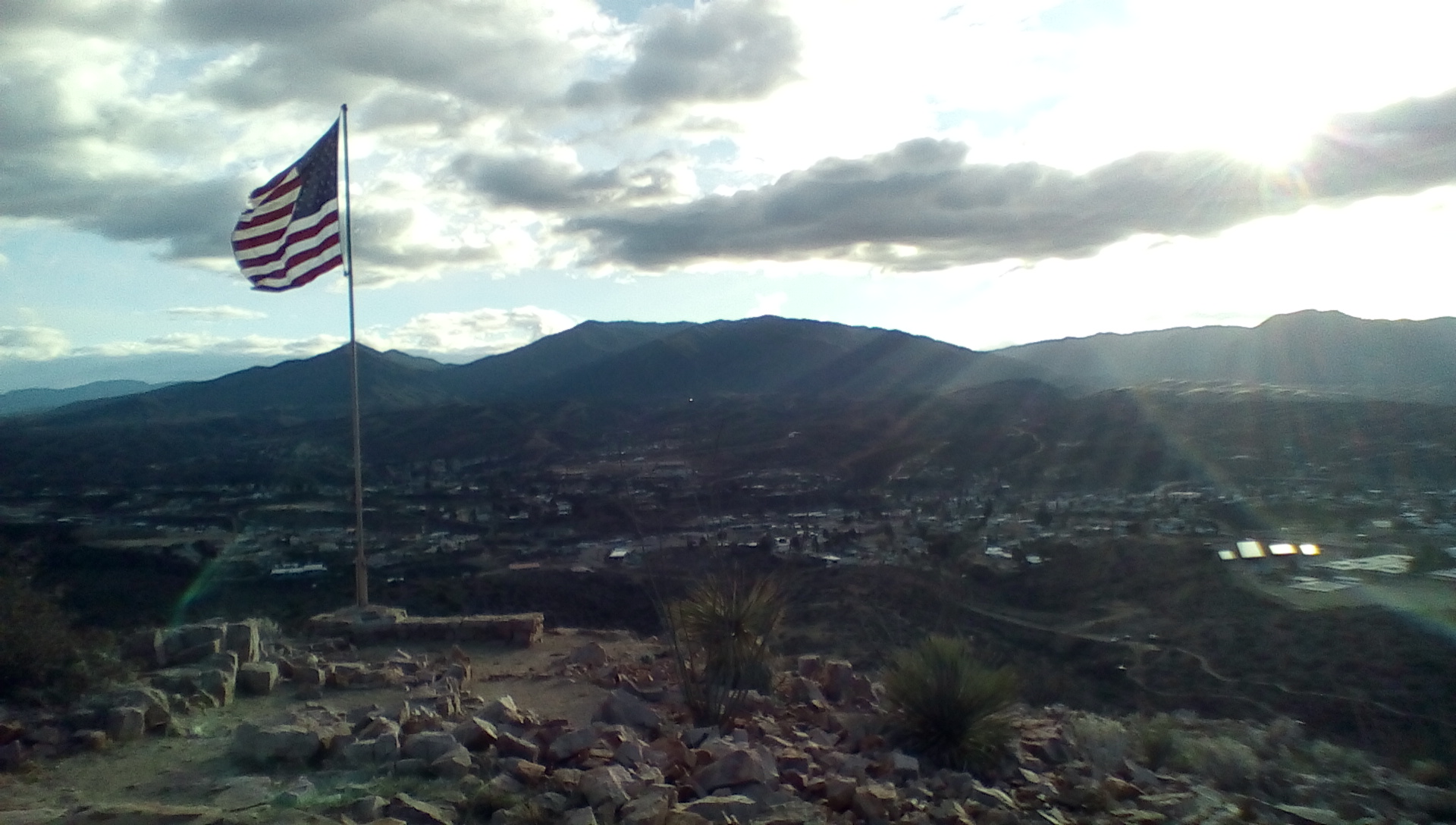
- View of the Pinal Mountains from atop Round Mountain north of Globe, Arizona (facing south)

Highest point
- Peak: Pinal Peak
- Elevation: 7,848 ft (2,392 m)
- Prominence: 4,086 ft (1,245 m)
- Coordinates: 33°16′56″N 110°49′16″W

Geography
- Location: Gila County, Arizona
- Region: Arizona transition zone Tonto National Forest

The Pinal Mountains (Yavapai: Walkame – "pine mountains", Western Apache: Dził Nnilchí' Diyiléé – "pine-burdened mountain") are a mountain range located in Gila County, Arizona. They have a maximum elevation of 7,848 ft (2,392 m) at Pinal Peak and a prominence of over 4,000 ft (1,200 m). The closest city is the Globe, Arizona/Miami, Arizona area, which is just a few miles north of the mountain range. The mountains are located within the Tonto National Forest, and their recreational facilities are maintained by the USDA's United States Forest Service. The San Carlos Indian Reservation is very close to the mountain range, with its boundaries being just a few miles east/northeast of the range. The mountains are covered with Ponderosa Pine and white fir and experience cooler weather than the Globe/Miami area, so that they are a popular recreation area in the summer. The maintained facilities include a maintained dirt road that goes all the way to the summit of Pinal Peak, a campsite and recreational area, many hiking trails, as well as some radio towers near both Pinal and Signal peaks (the two highest peaks of the range). The mountain range covers an area of 45,760 acres (18,520 ha).

== Location ==
Location of Pinal Peak within Arizona

The entire range is located in southern Gila County, Arizona and is a few miles south of Globe, Arizona and Miami, Arizona.

== History ==
The area around the Pinal Mountains was inhabited by Pueblo-culture Native Americans around the 11th and 12th centuries. This early culture has been called the Salado culture, and it thrived for centuries in the area. The Besh-Ba-Gowah ruins near the city of Globe are known to have been occupied by people of the Salado Culture from the 13th to 15th centuries. However, around the middle 15th century the Salado inhabitants abandoned the area and moved south, possibly merging with the Pima people in the process. Around this same time the Western Apache and Kwevkepaya-Yavapai people started to settle around the area. The Apache call the Pinal Mountains Dził Nnilchí' Diyiléé, meaning "pine-burdened mountain", while the Yavapai call the mountains Walkame, or "pine mountains". Later on, in the 17th century, the Spanish began to explore the region and met with the native peoples; they translated the natives' term for the mountain into Pinal, or "stand of pine trees" in Spanish. On at least one occasion the Pinal Mountains were a battle location between Spanish forces and the native Apache warriors; this brief conflict was called the Battle of the Pinal Mountains.

== Geology ==
The Pinal Mountains have an abundance and variety of minerals, both precious and non-precious. Numerous mining claims existed in the Pinal Mountains from 1875 to the early 1900s. With precious minerals such as Copper, Silver, and trace amounts of Gold being mined in varying quantities from the mountains during that period. Other less precious minerals found in more abundance in the mountains include Iron, Quartz, Calcite, Malachite, Azurite, Feldspar, Diorite, and the Lead ores of Galena and Anglesite. The most successful mine was the Gibson mine, located on the far western section of the range and was most successful from 1906-1918. It accounted for 99% of the total Copper and Silver production from the mountains, which totaled 12.5 million pounds (over 6,250 tons) of Copper and 3,500 ounces of Silver (as a by-product of the Copper mining). Many of the mines located higher up in the mountains helped develop some of the modern day hiking trails, one notable example being Sixshooter Canyon trail in the eastern section of the mountains. Which was a mining trail leading to a mine claim in the mid to late 1870s, the miners each wore Six shooters which led to the naming of the Canyon and the trail, in what was then the American frontier in Arizona. Today, however, there are no active mines on the mountains and most of the previous mines have long been mined out.

== Flora and fauna ==
The Pinal Mountains has a variety of plant and animal life; several species are exclusive to the area. Examples include Arizona prominent moth and a variable species of the Arizona hedgehog cactus. Other species of flora include ponderosa pine, white fir, juniper, Gambel oak, and Senecio neomexicanus toumeyi (also known as Toumey groundsel). Other fauna found in the mountains include javelina, white-tailed deer, mule deer, cottontail rabbit, tree squirrel, quail, little brown bat; American black bear, and mountain lion.

== Peaks ==
The Pinal Mountain range has 4 peaks, as listed by the official USGS topographic survey map of the area. All elevations are official as listed by the USGS survey map.

=== Central section ===
1. Pinal Peak - 7,848 ft (2,392 m).
2. Signal Peak - 7,812 ft (2,381 m).

=== Eastern section ===
3. East Mountain (HP) - 6,892 ft (2,101 m).

=== Northwestern section ===
4. Madera Peak - 6,647 ft (2,026 m).

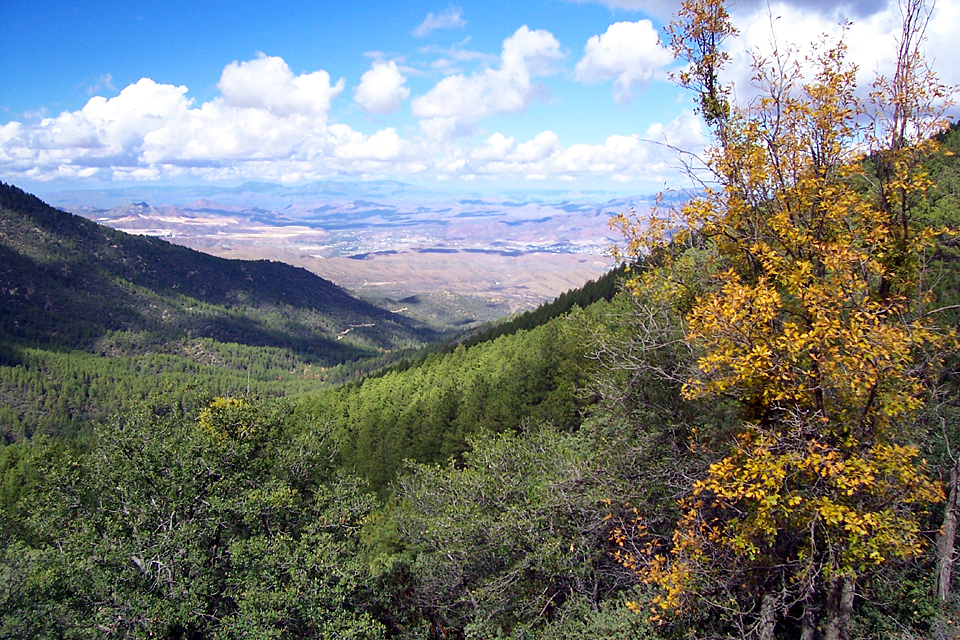
Pinal Mountains

== Recreation ==
The mountains are often a place of recreation in the summer months, due to their cooler climate and scenic beauty. There are many trails and a campsite to support recreation.

=== Trails ===
Recreation areas on Pinal Mountain include at least 8 public hiking trails, two of which are Sixshooter Canyon Trail #197 and Icehouse Canyon Trail #198, both located on the northeastern side of the mountain and accessible via maintained roads.

=== Campsite ===
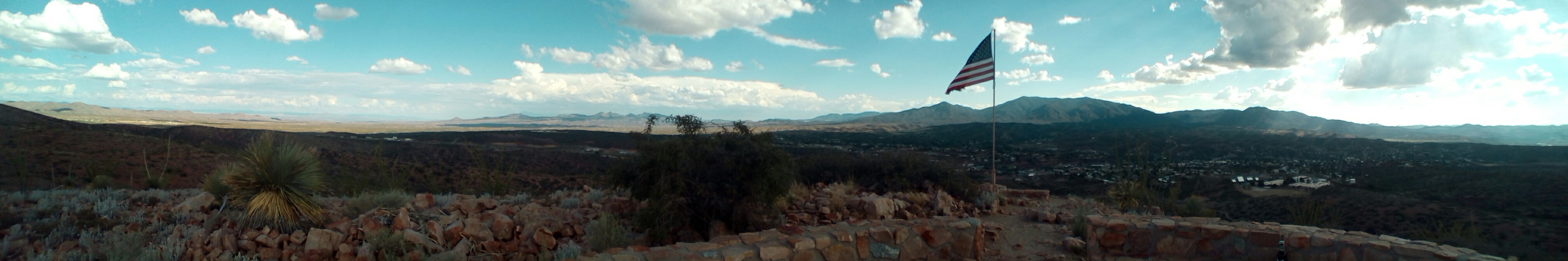
Panorama of the Pinal Mountains and the surrounding area. The mountains are the prominent range on the right.

The Pinal Mountain recreation area also includes a public campsite, with 16 units with picnic tables, fire-pit grills, and 4 vault bathrooms. The open season for this campsite is May–November according to the USDA Forest Service. The campsite is reachable via a maintained dirt road that stretches to the top of the mountain.

== Gallery ==
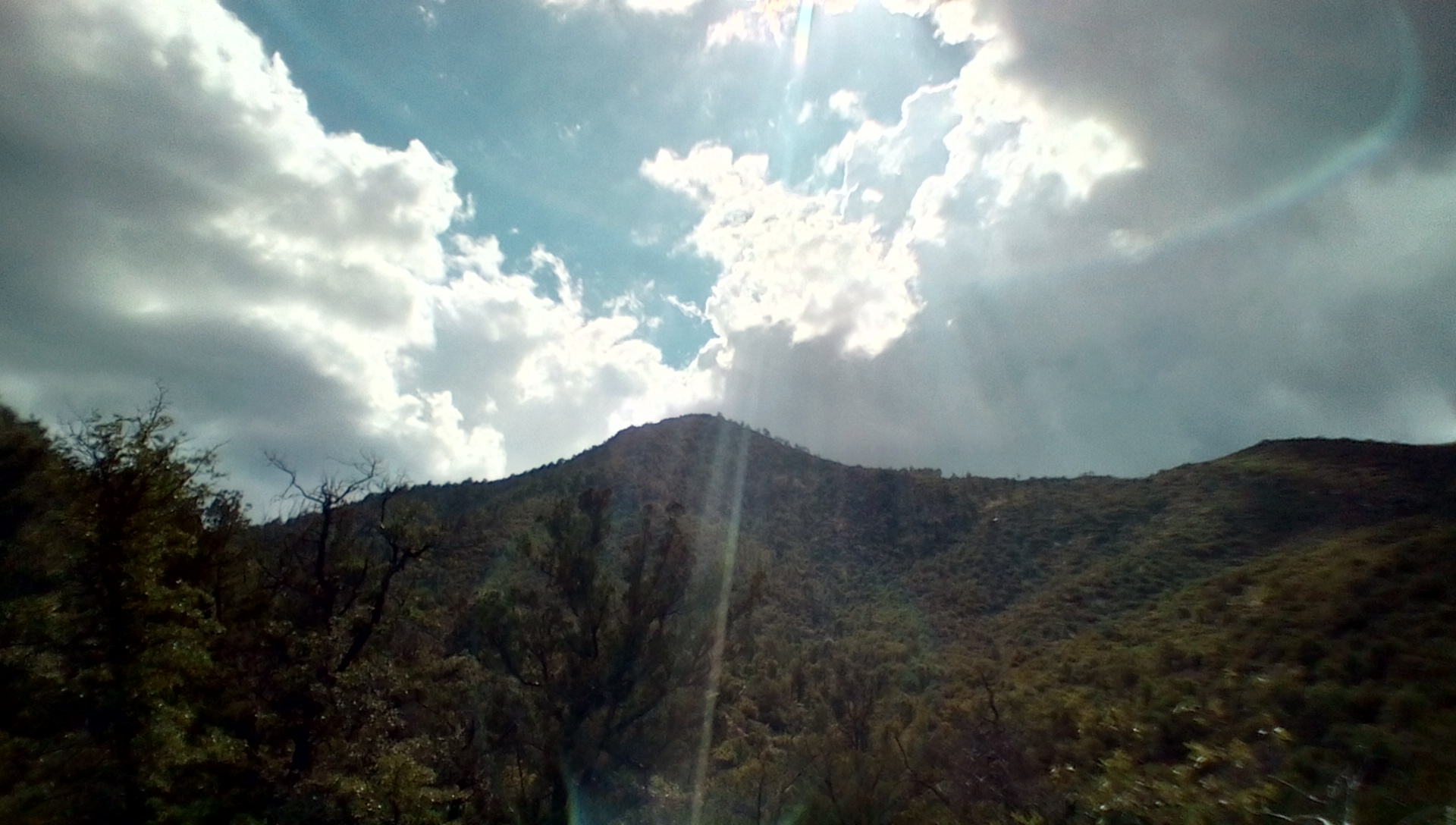

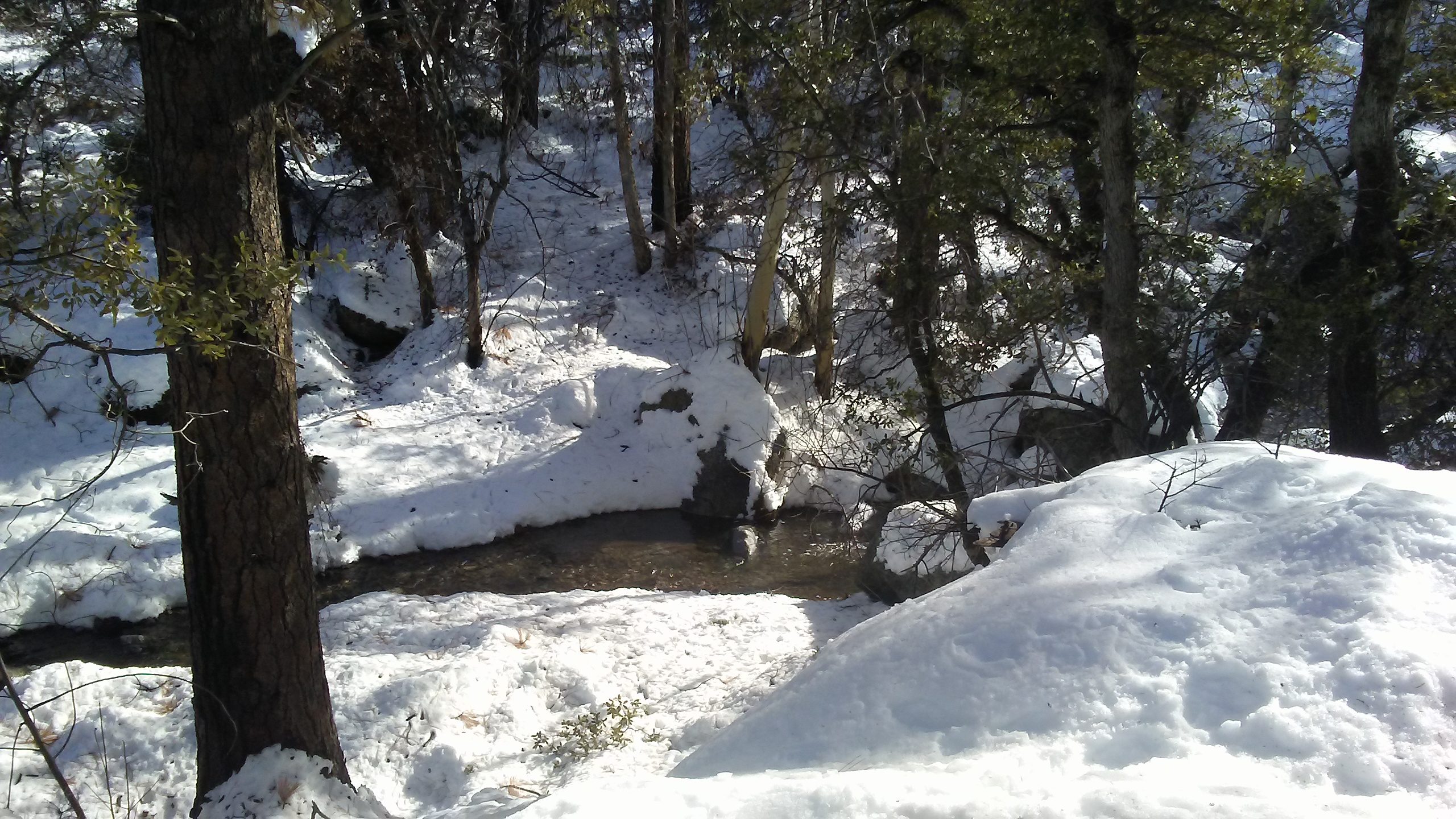

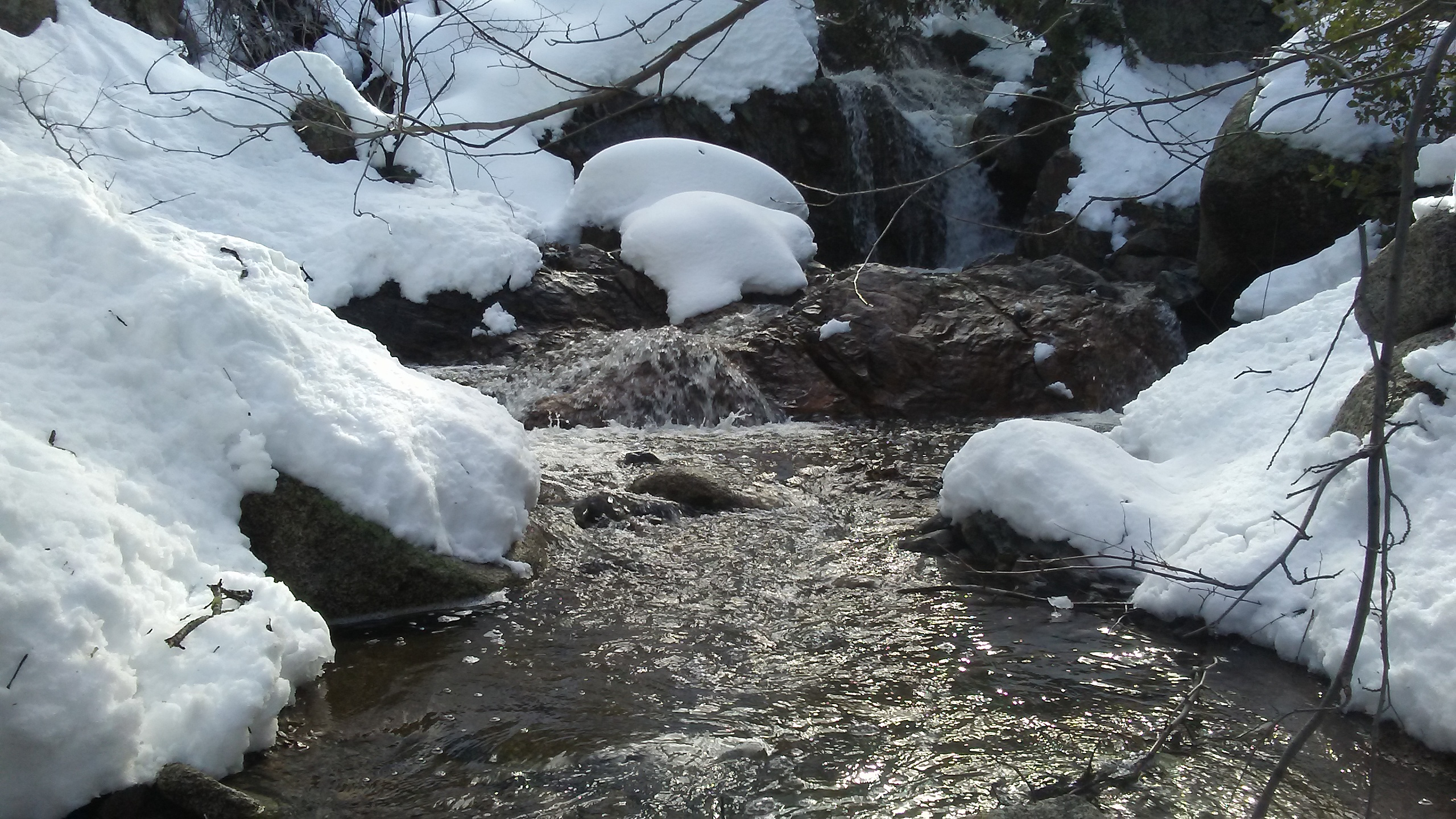

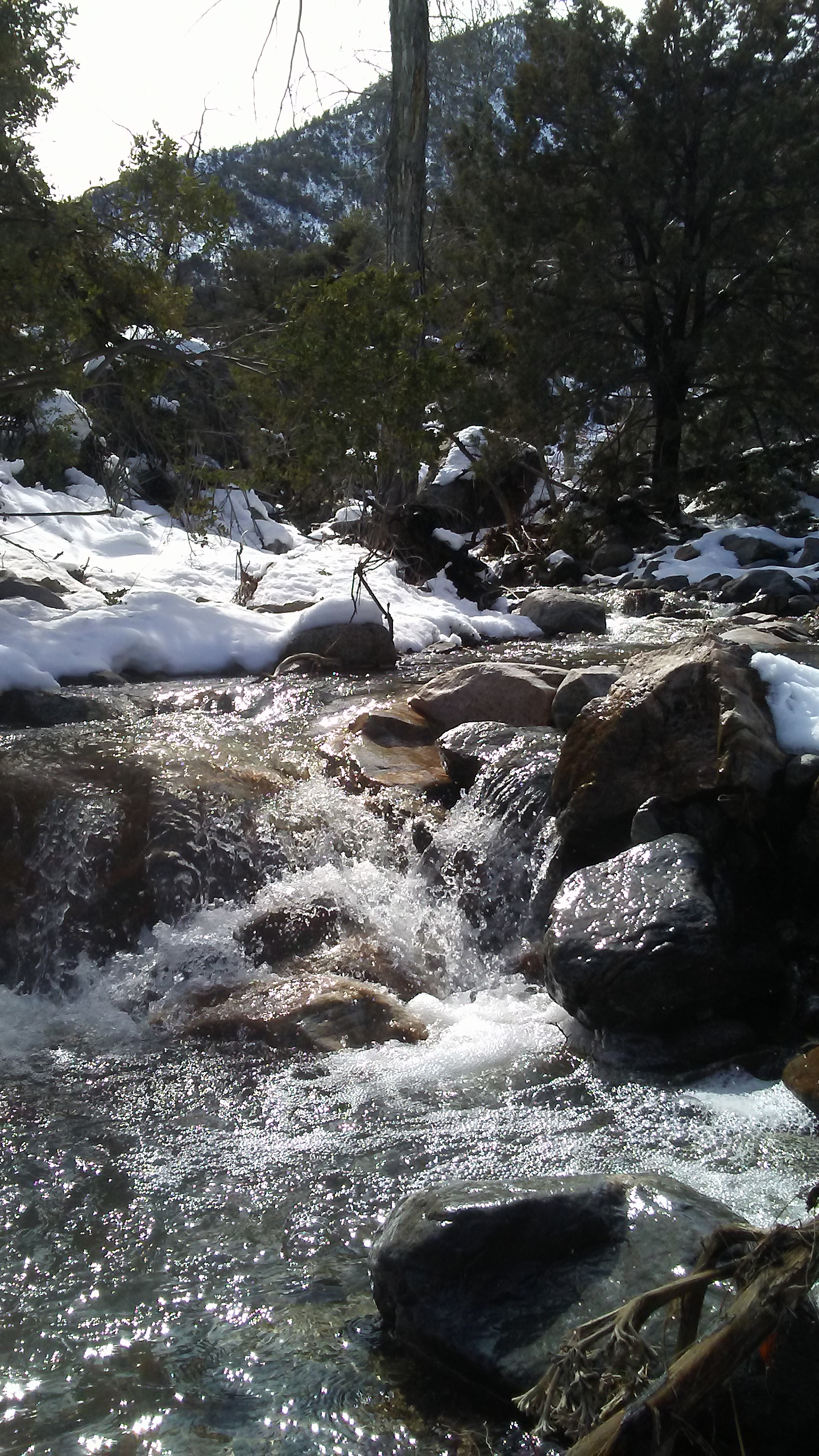

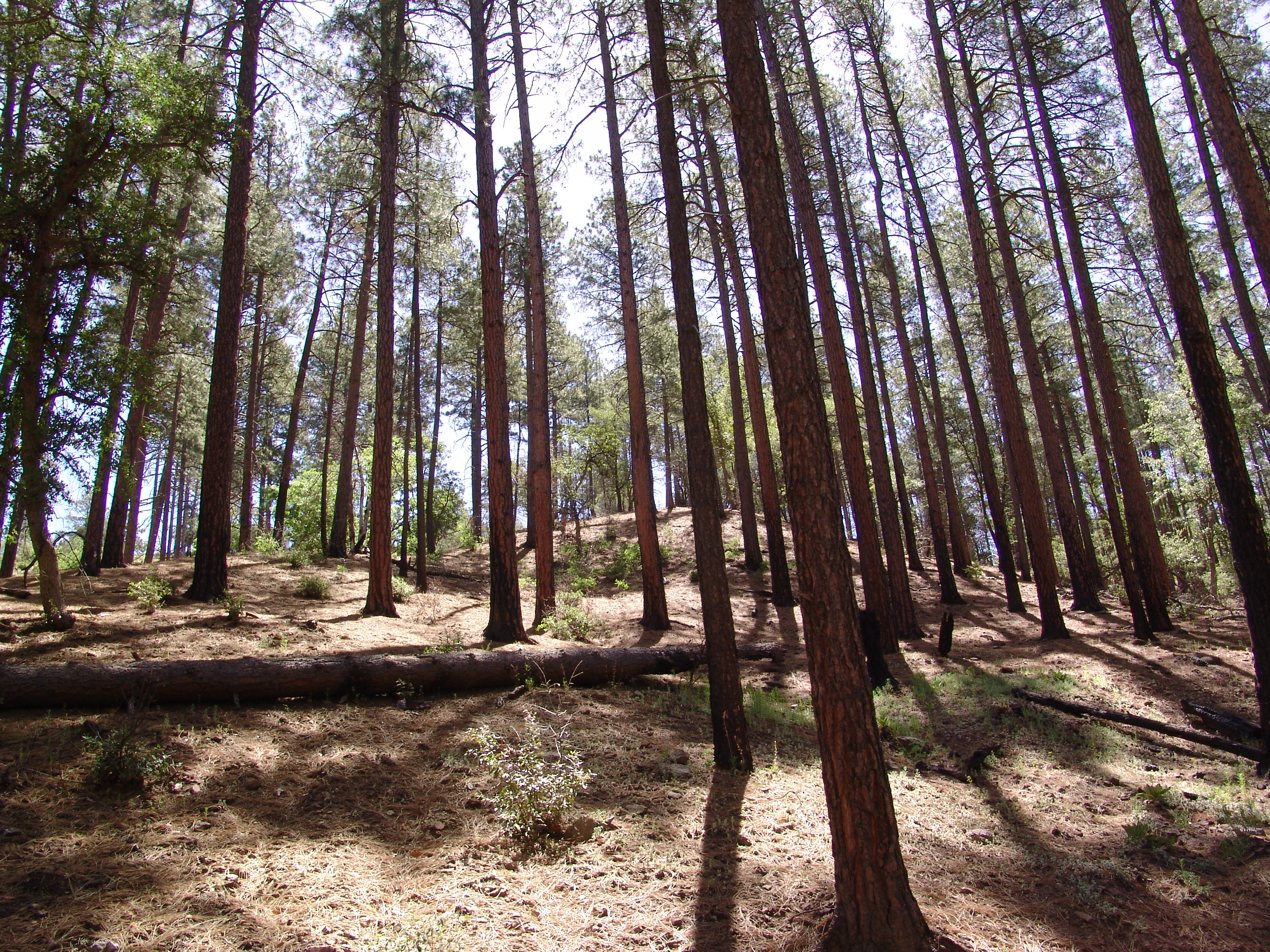

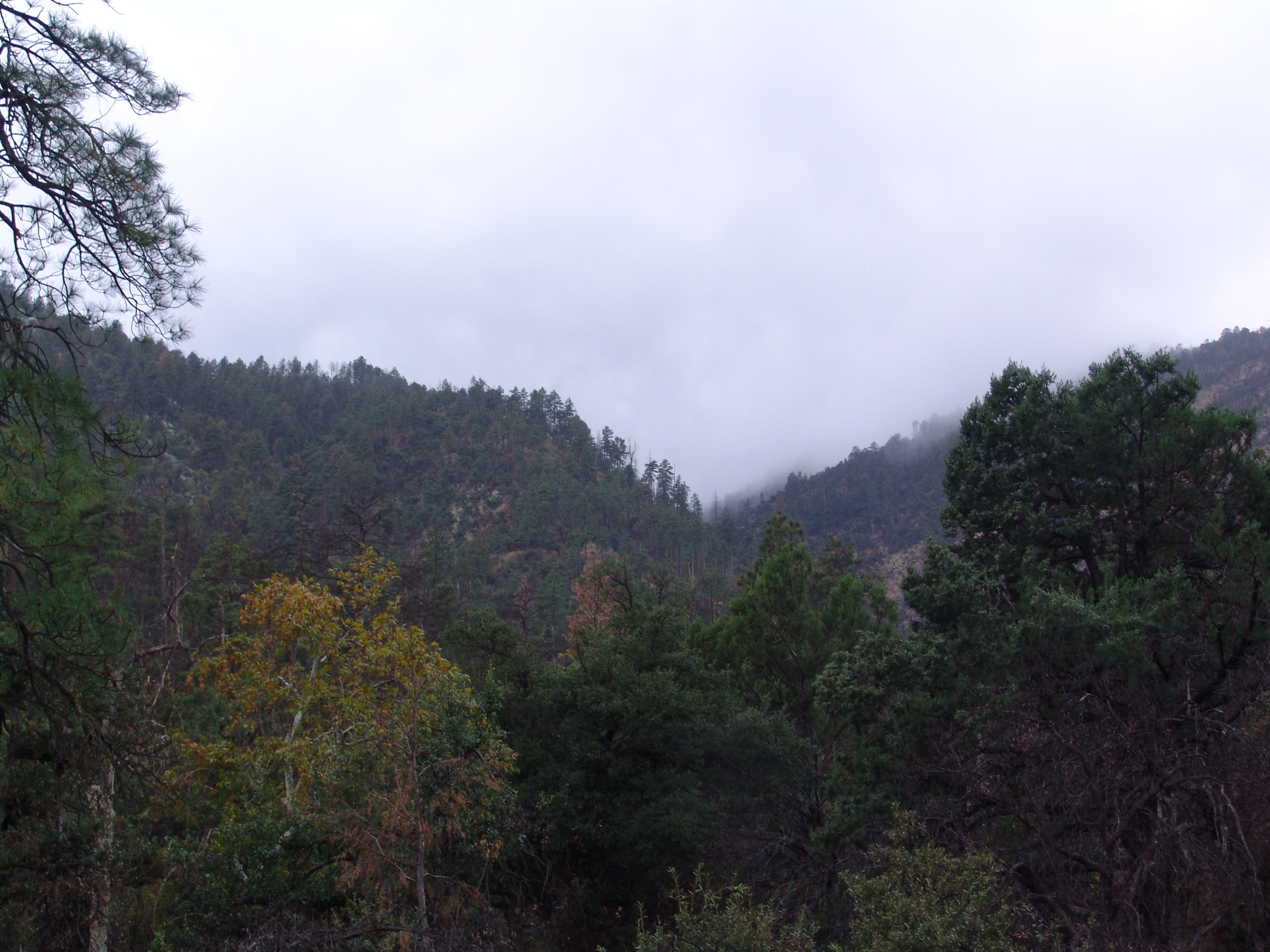

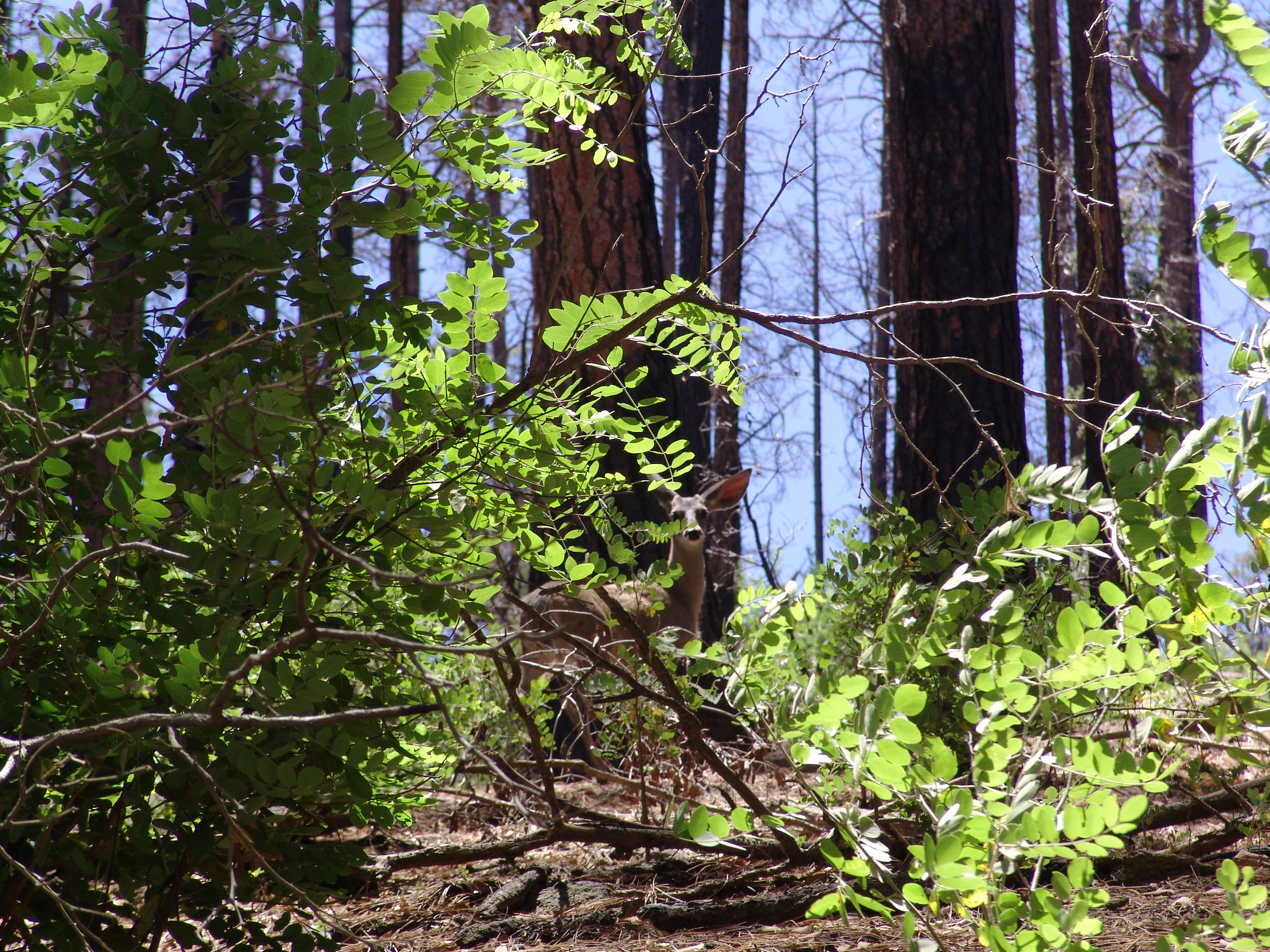

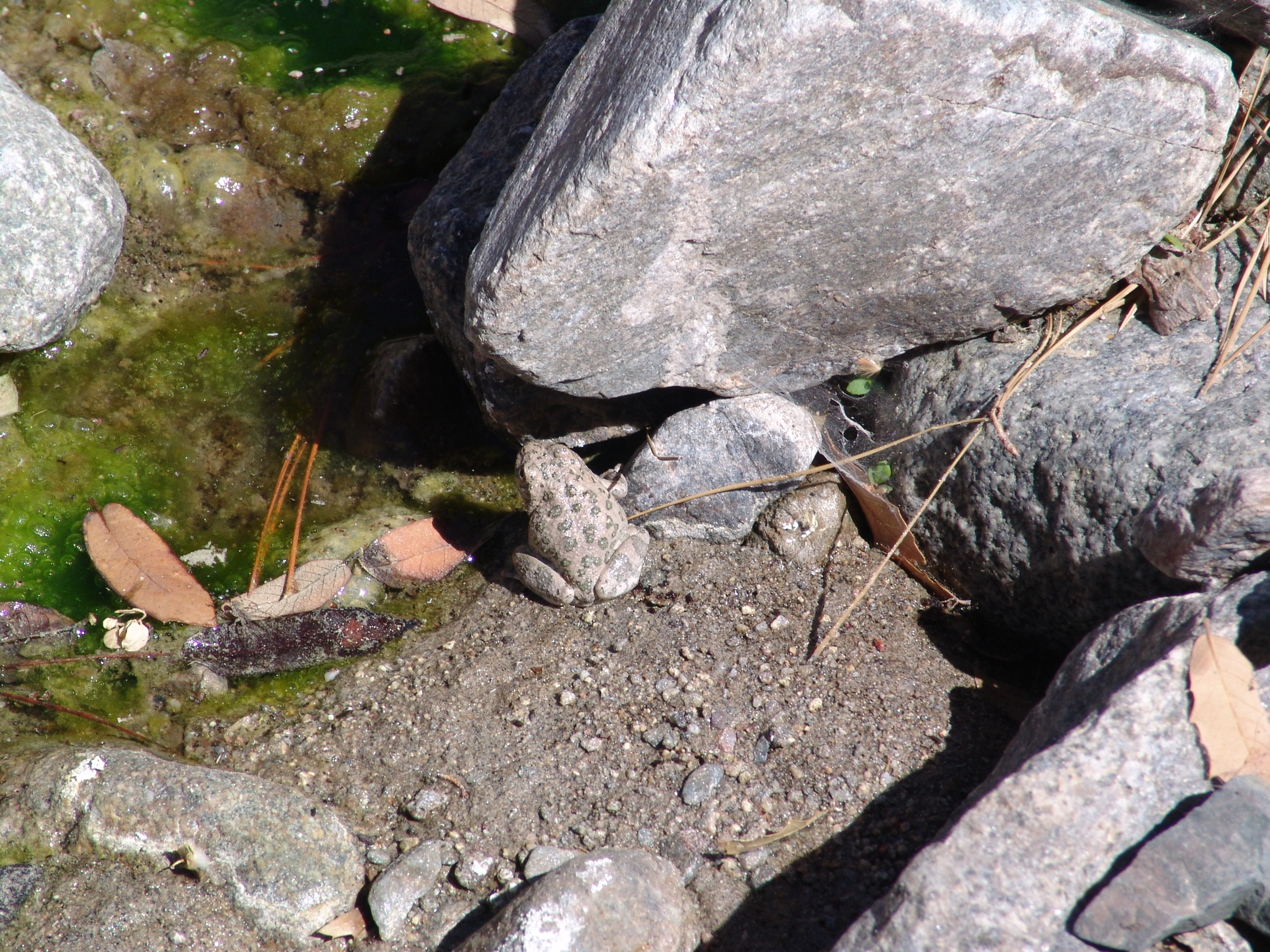

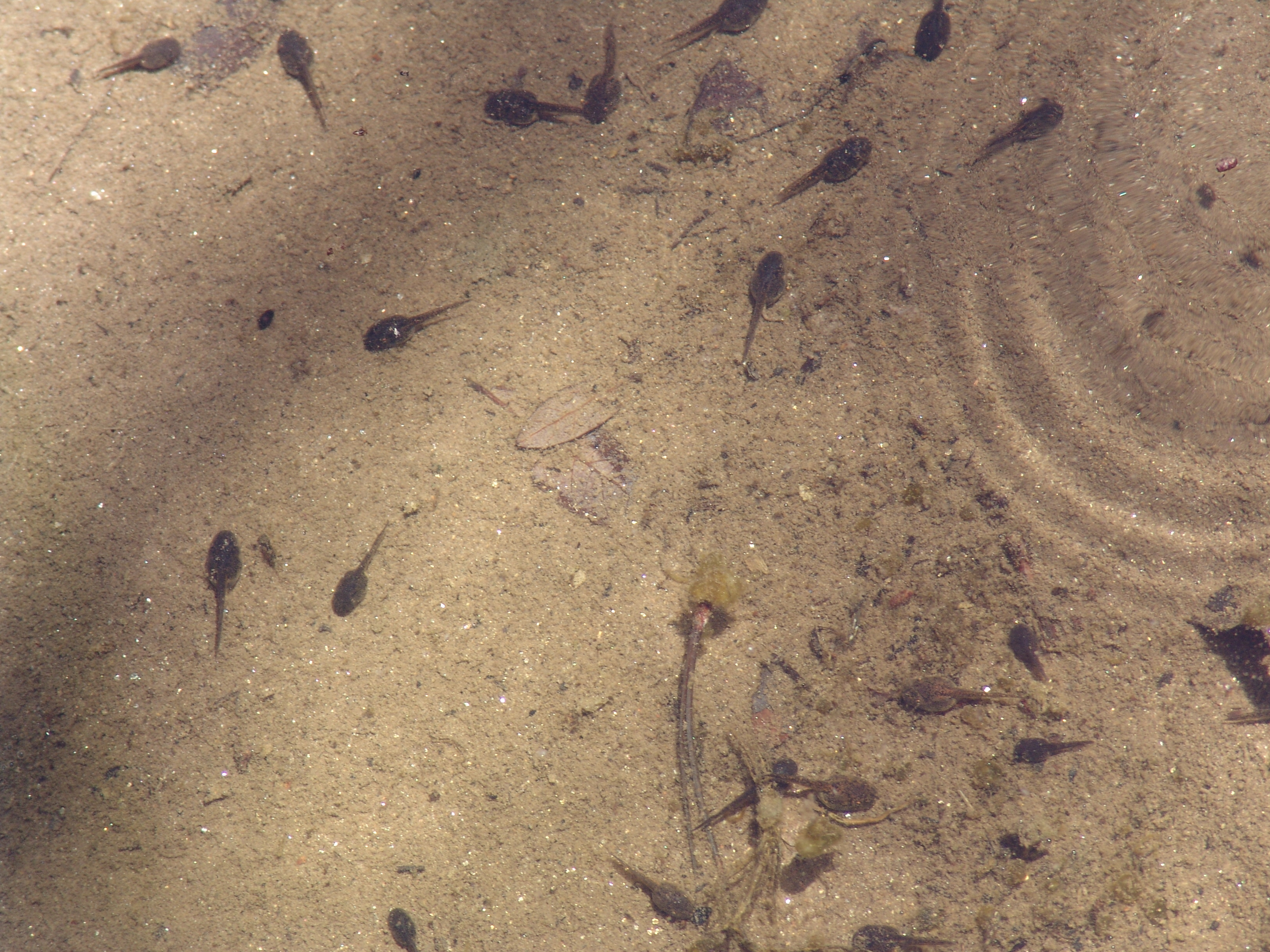

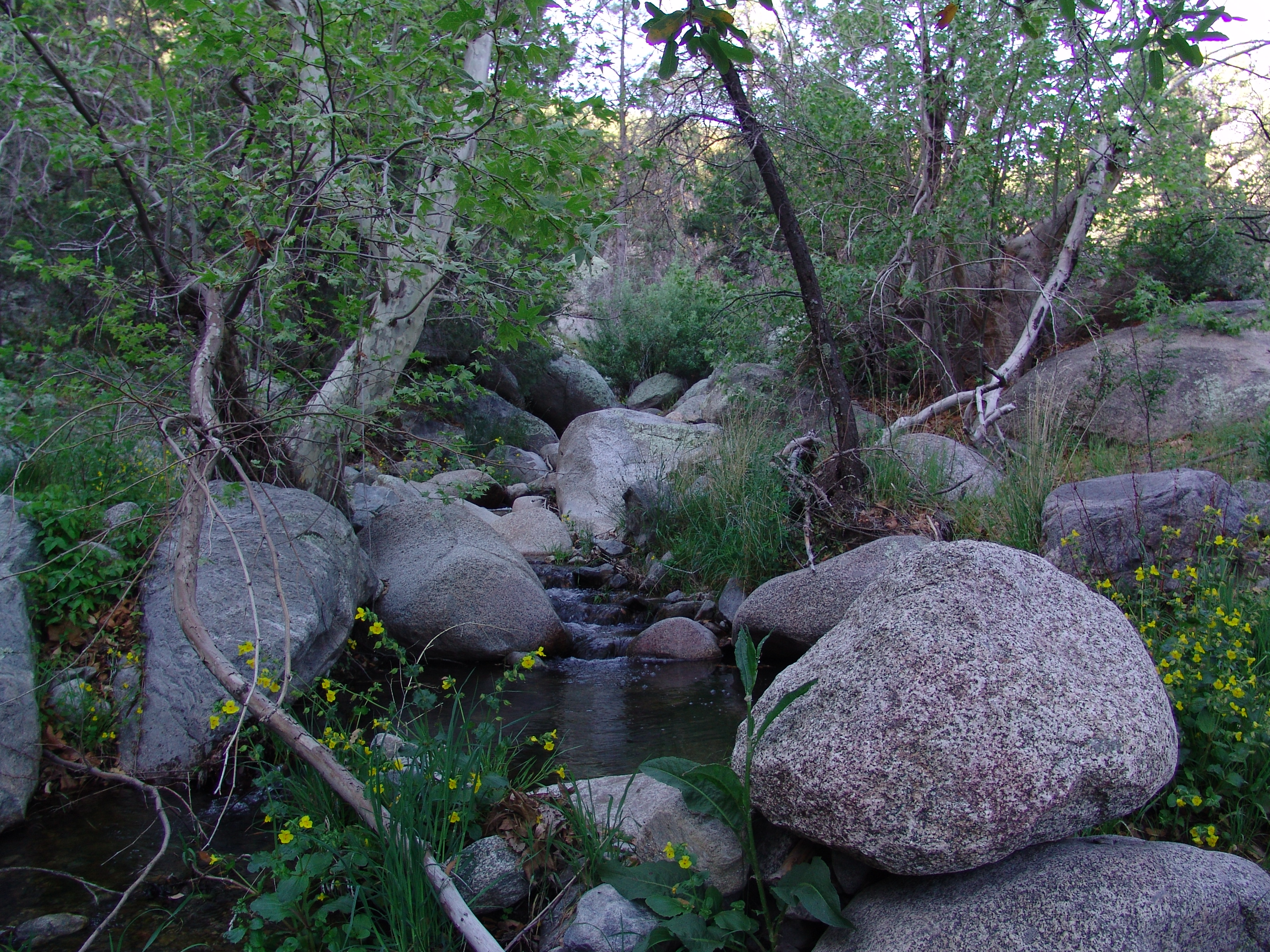
