= Battle of the Pinal Mountains =

1788 battle during the Mexican Apache Wars

- Part of the Mexican Apache Wars
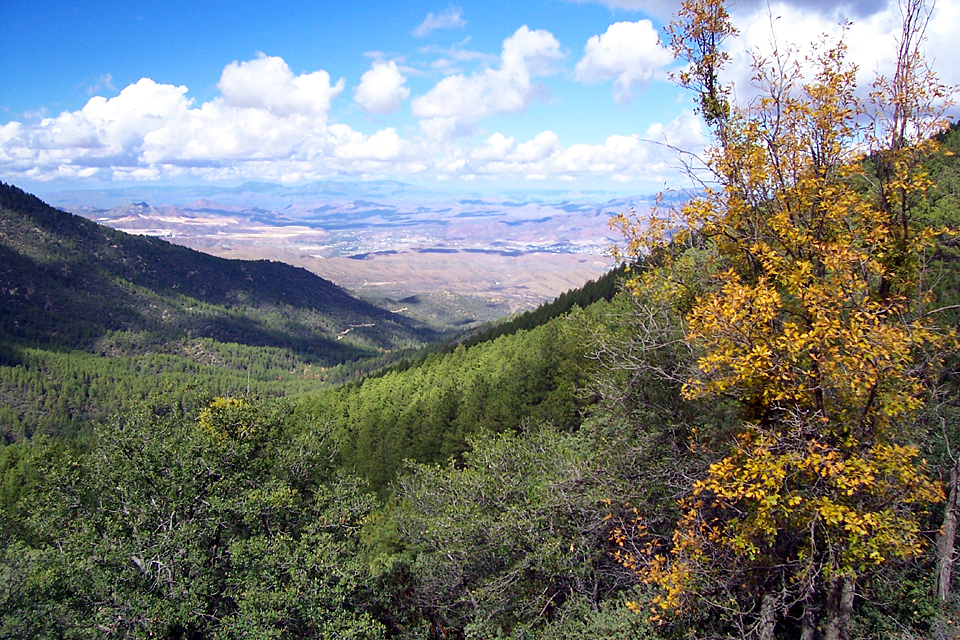
- A view from within the Pinal Mountains.
| Date | One day in mid June 1788. |
| Location | Pinal Mountains, Arizona 33°16′56″N 110°49′16″W |
| Result | Spanish victory |

Belligerents
| Spain | Apache |

Commanders and leaders
| (Spain) Pablo Romero (Spain) José Moraga | Quilcho |

Strength
| 208 | ~100 |

Casualties and losses
| 1 killed | 6 killed 23 captured |

The Battle of the Pinal Mountains was one of many small battles to occur between Apache warriors and Spanish colonists. The exact date of the battle is unknown but happened on one day in mid-June 1788 in the Pinal Mountains of east-central Arizona.

== Battle ==
Beginning on May 31, 1788, to June 24, Captain Pablo Romero of the Spanish Army led a 208-man force of Sonoran troops that killed eleven Apache warriors and four women and children. Thirty-four Apache men, women and children were captured. The Apaches slain included a chieftain named Quilcho.

Romero's expedition recovered two captive Pimas from Tucson and eleven animals, with a loss of two men dead. The so-called highlight of this offensive was a battle in the Pinal Mountains. Ensign José Moraga with about ten men from their pack-train escort decided to scout ahead of the wagon train.

After scouting for a little while in the extreme front on horseback, the force spotted and attacked a ranchería, protected by "no more than 100 enemies". After Moraga killed one Apache himself in hand-to-hand combat, Captain Romero, commanding the main force, heard the firing and raced to the scene, arriving just before the battle ended where his men were skirmishing a bit. The Spaniards lost one man, but killed six Apache warriors.

== Aftermath ==
Captain Romero evidently left straightaway after the expedition ended to report to the commandant of arms in Arizpe how well he had succeeded in his sweep across Apacheria, so the King of Spain granted him a commission. However, shortly thereafter, on June 30, a band of Apaches caught and killed him on the hill of San Borja between Sonora and Bacoachi. Thus, Romero did not live to see the king's commission granting him 2,400 pesos salary. Romero left a widow, Doña Luisa Bojórquez, and at least two sons.

== See also ==
- Capture of Tucson (1846)
- Capture of Tucson (1862)
- Siege of Tubac
- American Indian Wars
- Apache Wars
- Navajo Wars
