= El Piñal, Táchira, Venezuela =

Community in Venezuela

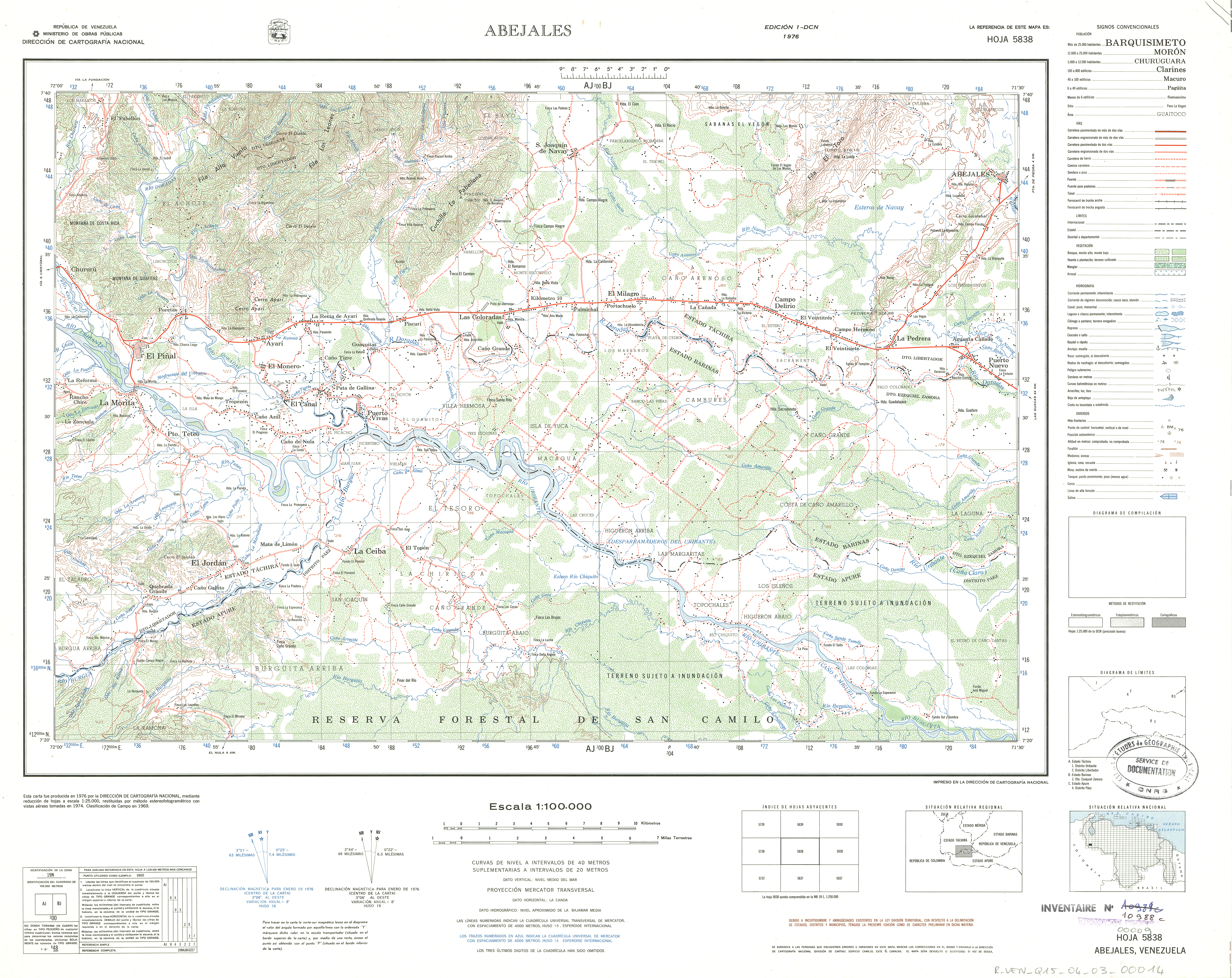
A 1976 official government map of the area including El Piñal

El Piñal is a community in Venezuela. A planned development including a health center and agricultural industries, it is in the Andes region in the state of Táchira.

== History ==
A 1956 report described it as a new community with planned housing and a health center. It stated the name means pineapple field and the community's full name was initially San Rafael de El Piñal.

A 2012 report notes a few cocoa growers in the area. There is a local hospital. A report of unclear date reported 16,000 inhabitants. El Piñal is 35 kilometers from the state capital of San Cristobal. Two rivers meet in the area. Investments in a yuca processing plant and cattle for food and milk have been undertaken in El Piñal.
