= Pinal Peak =

Landform in Pinal County, Arizona

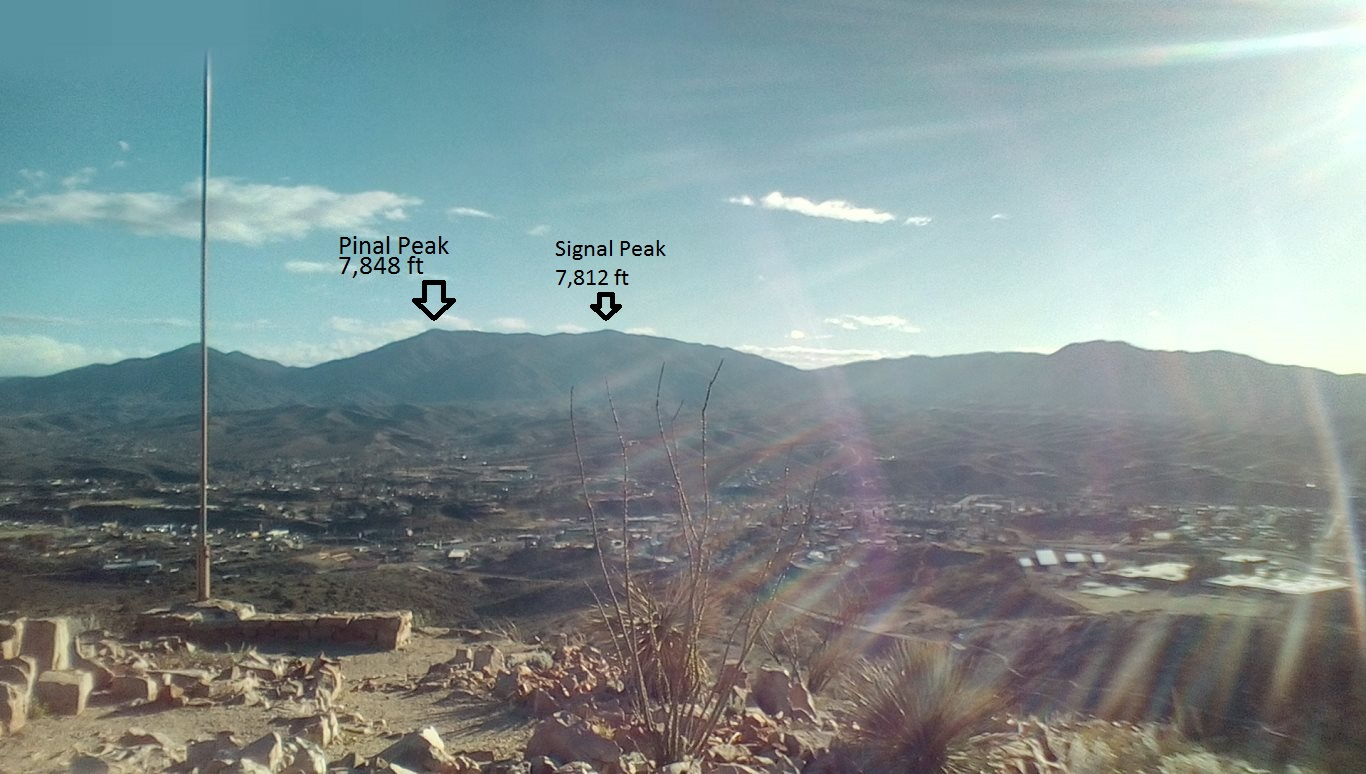
- Locations and elevations of Pinal and Signal Peaks, the two highest peaks of the Pinal Mountains

Highest point
- Elevation: 7,848 ft (2,392 m)
- Prominence: 4,086 ft (1,245 m)
- Coordinates: 33°16′56″N 110°49′16″W

Geography
- Location within Arizona
- Parent range: Pinal Mountains
- Topo map: USGS Pinal Peak

Pinal Peak, located in southern Gila County, Arizona, is the highest point in the Pinal Mountains, with an elevation of 7,848 feet (2,392 m). It is the highest point of land located in between the Salt and Gila rivers in Arizona before they merge, making it visible from miles away on a clear day. The peak ranks as the 11th most prominent in Arizona and has a topographic isolation of 35 miles (56 km), with the nearest point of land of equal or greater elevation being to the southeast in the Santa Teresa Mountains. Pinal Peak is slightly east of the approximate center of the Pinal Mountains. Despite being the most prominent peak in Gila County, it is not the highest point in the county. That title goes to Myrtle Point with an elevation between 7,963 and 8,003 feet (2,427–2,439 m), which lies atop the edge of the Mogollon Rim which forms the county line with Coconino County. The nearest population is in the Globe/Miami, Arizona area, just a few miles north of the range and peak.

== History ==
The areas around the Pinal Mountains have been populated by Native Americans since the 12th century, and were an important resource for them. The Besh-Ba-Gowah ruins are located in the foothills of the Pinal Mountains. In the late 17th century the mountains were scouted by Spanish explorers who gave it its modern name. They translated the native Apache and Yavapai terms for the mountains as "Pinal" or Pine Mountains. Later still, in the mid-19th century, the U.S. Army scouted the mountains, and used Signal Peak as a heliograph station, which is how that peak got its name. Today there are radio masts and towers on both Pinal and Signal Peaks.

== Recreation ==
Several maintained dirt roads lead to the peak, and at least two of eight hiking trails in the mountains connect to the summit. The Upper Pinal Campground, located on the shallow saddle between Pinal and Signal Peaks, is open from May to November. The United States Forest Service maintains the recreational facilities in the mountains, which are inside the Tonto National Forest.
