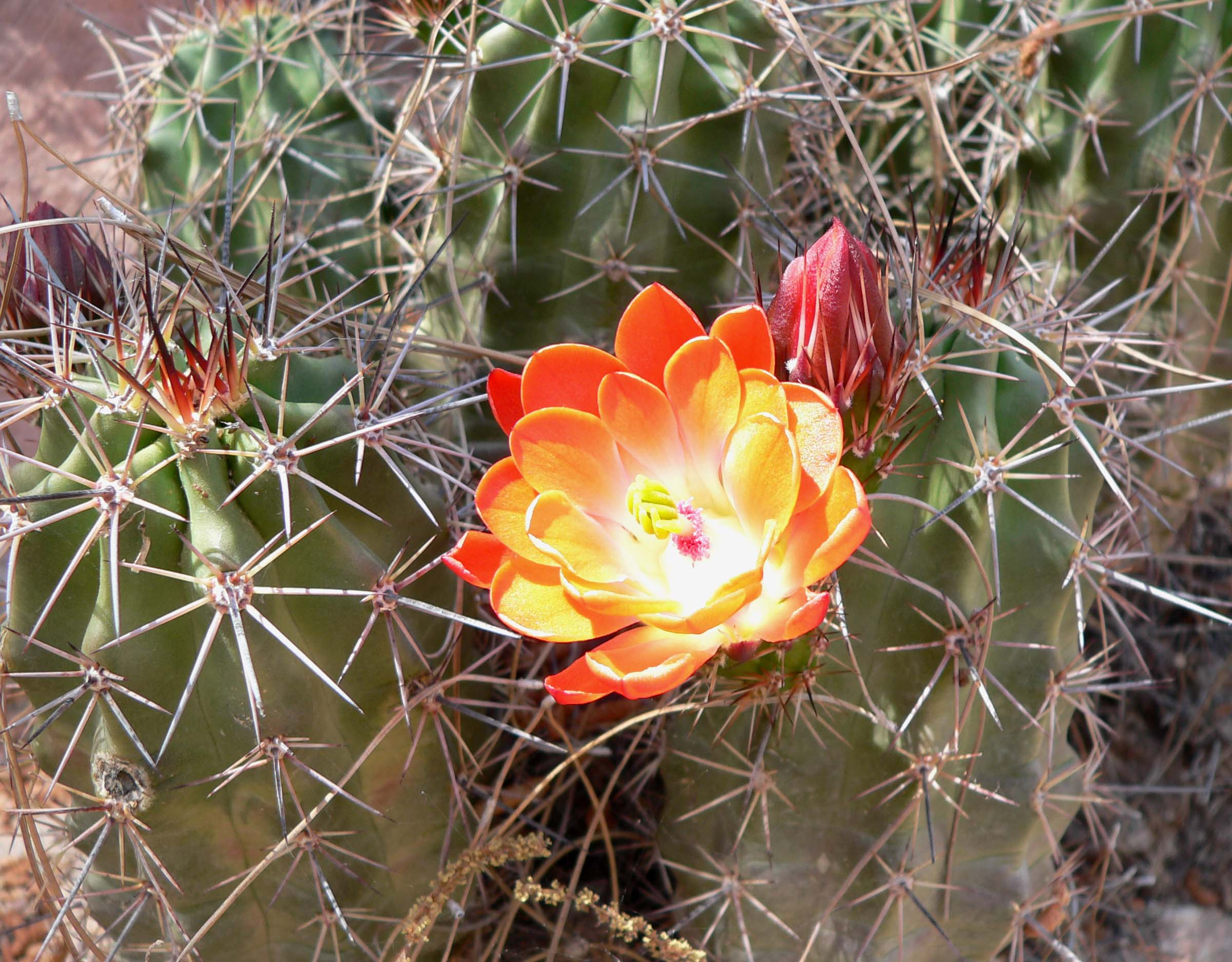

Conservation status
- Least Concern (IUCN 3.1)

Scientific classification
- Kingdom: Plantae
- Clade: Tracheophytes
- Clade: Angiosperms
- Clade: Eudicots
- Order: Caryophyllales
- Family: Cactaceae
- Subfamily: Cactoideae
- Genus: Echinocereus
- Species: E. arizonicus

Binomial name
- Echinocereus arizonicus Rose ex Orcutt

Synonyms
- Echinocereus coccineus var. arizonicus (Rose ex Orcutt) D.J.Ferguson 1989; Echinocereus triglochidiatus var. arizonicus (Rose ex Orcutt) L.D.Benson 1969; Echinocereus arizonicus subsp. matudae (Bravo) Rutow 1994; Echinocereus arizonicus subsp. nigrihorridispinus W.Blum & Rutow 1998; Echinocereus arizonicus subsp. oldachiorum W.Blum & P.B.Breslin 2018; Echinocereus matudae Bravo 1961

= Echinocereus arizonicus =

Species of cactus

Echinocereus arizonicus is a species of cactus native to the Chihuahuan Desert region of Chihuahua, southwestern New Mexico and southeastern Arizona, as well as in the Superstition and Mescal Mountains of Central Arizona at elevations between 1400 and 1900 meters.

== Description ==
Plants grow in small clumps. Stems are cylindric with 8–13 ribs, measuring 10 cm–40 cm × 5 cm–10 cm (3.9 in–15.7 in × 2.0 in–3.9 in). Areoles are spaced 10–15 mm (0.39–0.59 in) apart. Spines vary, being straight or contorted. Each areole has 1–8 central spines, 15–50 mm (0.59–1.97 in) long, and 7–14 radial spines, 5–25 mm (0.20–0.98 in) long, initially yellowish to brownish but turning gray. Echinocereus arizonicus has deep red to bright orange-red flowers, sometimes with a lighter yellowish-green center, 5.5 cm–7 cm × 3.5 cm–5 cm (2.2 in–2.8 in × 1.4 in–2.0 in), with a flower tube of 25–35 mm (0.98–1.38 in) that has short spines and 2 mm (0.079 in) hairs. Fruits are green with a brownish tinge, 20–30 mm (0.79–1.18 in), and have white pulp. The chromosome count is 2n = 22.

== Subspecies ==
Accepted subspecies:

Image	Subspecies	Distribution
	Echinocereus arizonicus subsp. arizonicus	Central Arizona
	Echinocereus arizonicus subsp. matudae (Bravo) Rutow	Mexico (Chihuahua)
	Echinocereus arizonicus subsp. nigrihorridispinus W.Blum & Rutow	Arizona to New Mexico
	Echinocereus arizonicus subsp. oldachiorum W.Blum & P.B.Breslin	Arizona to New Mexico

== Distribution ==
Plants are found growing in desert scrub and grasslands of the Chihuahuan Desert in Arizona, New Mexico in the United States and Chihuahua, Mexico at elevations between 1400 and 1900 meters. Plants are found growing along with Quercus turbinella, Quercus emoryi, Arctostaphylos pungens, Cercocarpus montanus, Nolina microcarpa, Dasylirion wheeleri, Agave chrysantha, Muhlenbergia emersleyi, Pinus monophylla, Juniperus pinchotii and Rhus trilobata.

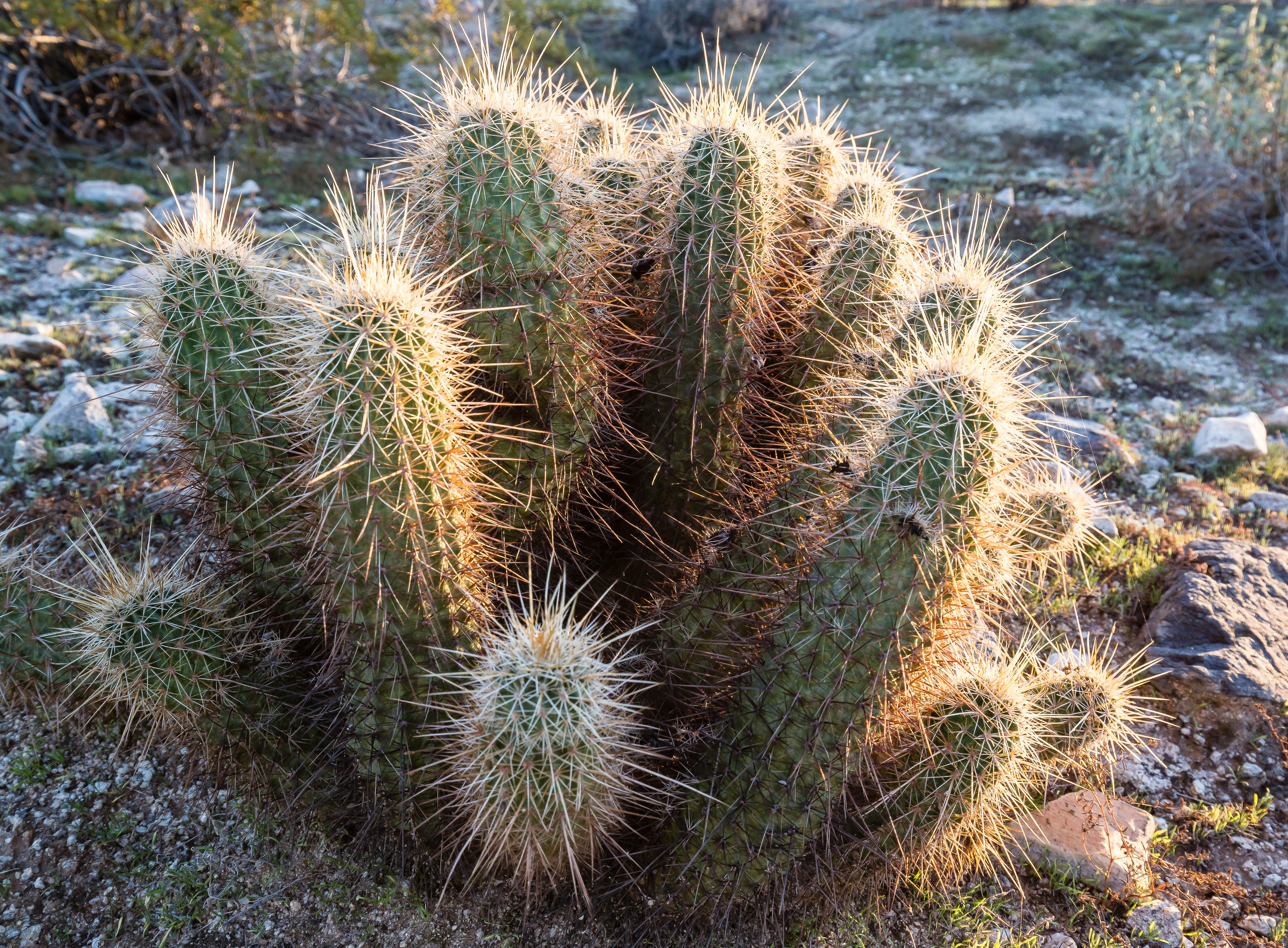
Plant growing in South Mountain Park in Phoenix, Arizona

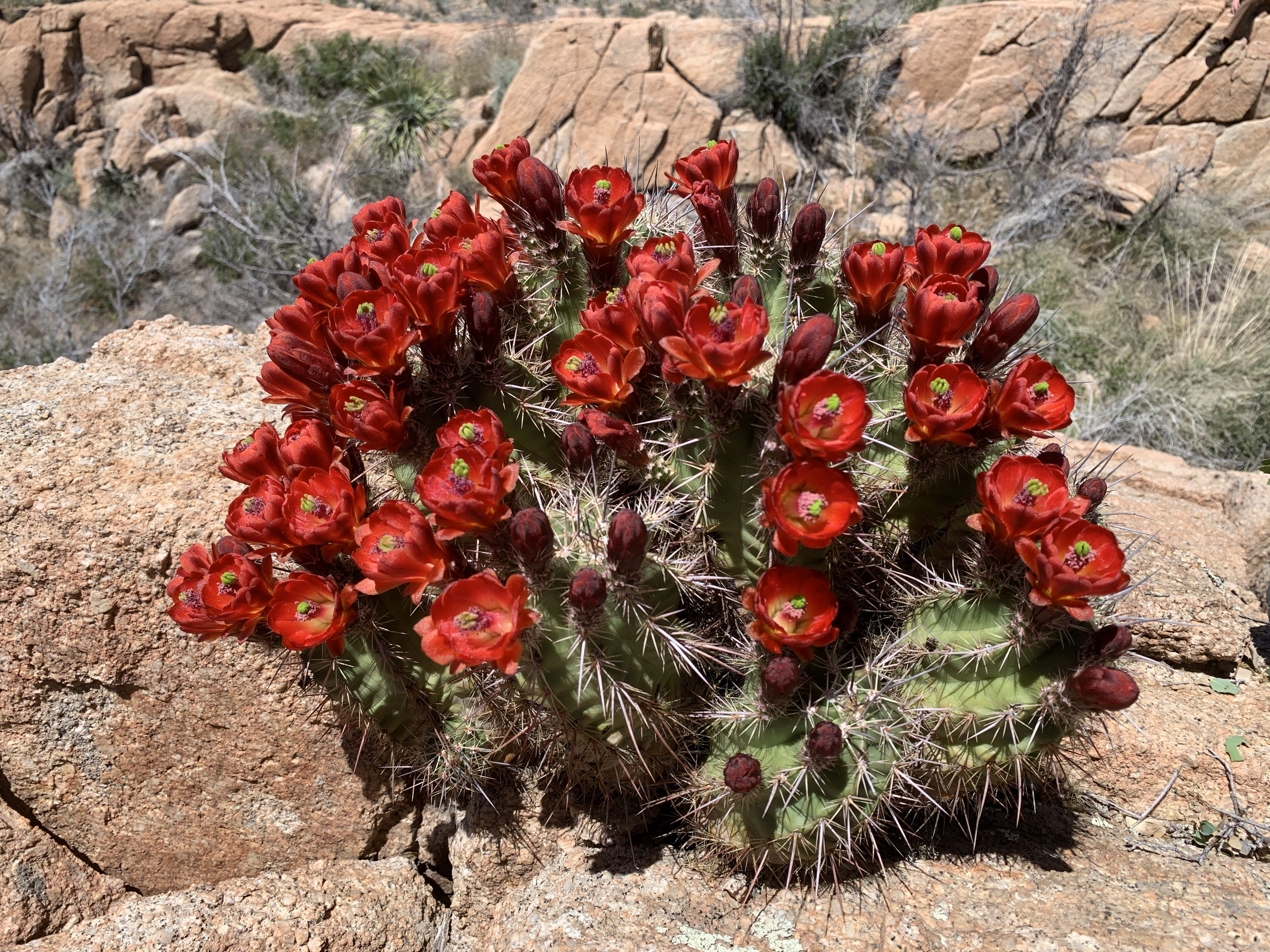
Blooming Plant in Tonto National Forest

== Taxonomy ==
Common names include "Arizona claret-cup cactus" and "Arizona hedgehog cactus."
