= Cezanne (disambiguation) =

Paul Cézanne was a French artist.

Cezanne may also refer to:

- Cezanne (crater)
- Cezanne (horse)
- Cézanne (typeface), a typeface based on Paul Cézanne's handwriting
- Saef al Nazi or Cezanne, bassist of Artcell
- AMD Cezanne, an Accelerated Processing Unit (APU) series by AMD
- MS SeaFrance Cézanne, a ferry

== People with the name ==
- Cezanne Khan, Indian actor
- Imani Cezanne, American activist and spoken word poet.
- Jörg Cezanne (born 1958), German politician
- Cézanne, Miss Continental 1994

== See also ==
- Césanne, a municipality in Piedmont
- Sézanne, a commune in the French department of Marne
