= Taliesin West =

Studio and home in Scottsdale, Arizona

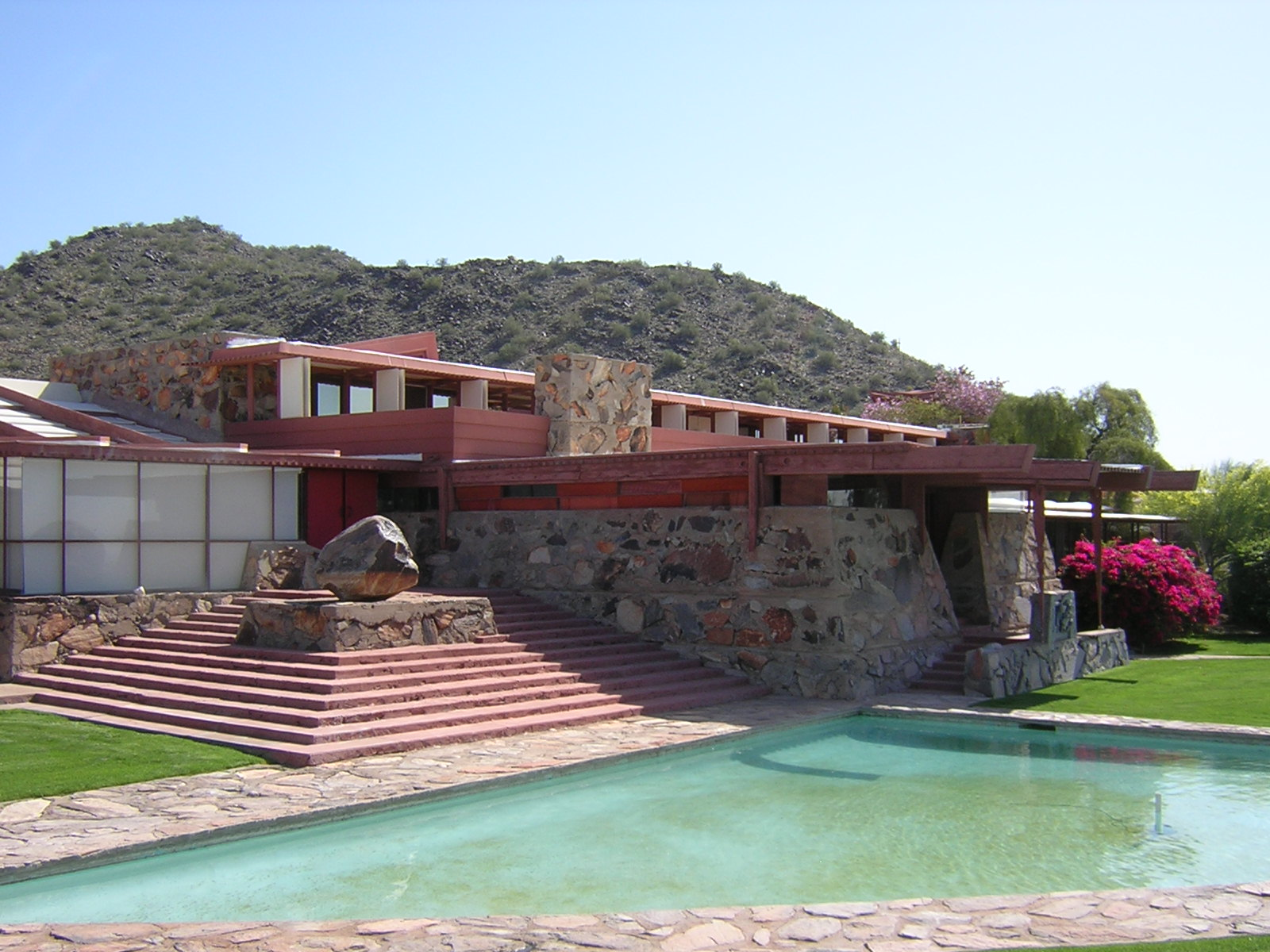
- Pool and terrace outside the main building, facing east toward Taliesin West's vault and drafting room (2004)

- Location within Arizona Location within the United States
- 33°36′23″N 111°50′43″W
- Location: Scottsdale, Arizona, U.S.

History
- Built: 1937

Site notes
- Area: 491 acres (199 ha)
- Architect: Frank Lloyd Wright
- Architectural style: Organic architecture

UNESCO World Heritage Site
- Criteria: Cultural: (ii)
- Designated: 2019 (43rd session)
- Part of: The 20th-Century Architecture of Frank Lloyd Wright
- Reference no.: 1496-007
- Region: North America

U.S. National Register of Historic Places
- Designated: February 12, 1974
- Reference no.: 74000457

U.S. National Historic Landmark
- Designated: May 20, 1982

Taliesin West (/ˌtæliːˈɛsɪn/ tal-ee-ESS-in) is a studio and home developed by the American architect Frank Lloyd Wright in Scottsdale, Arizona, United States. Named after Wright's Taliesin studio in Spring Green, Wisconsin, Taliesin West was Wright's winter home and studio from 1937 until his death in 1959. The complex is the headquarters of the Frank Lloyd Wright Foundation, a nonprofit organization, which hosts tours and events there. Taliesin West is designated as a National Historic Landmark and a World Heritage Site.

Wright and his Taliesin Fellowship (later the School of Architecture) began making wintertime pilgrimages from Wisconsin to Arizona in 1935, and he bought a site in the McDowell Mountains two years later. His apprentices set up a temporary camp there, erecting the initial structures between 1938 and 1941. During Wright's lifetime, he oversaw several expansions, and some of the original construction materials were replaced. After Wright's death, the fellowship continued to modify the structures, and Taliesin West gradually gained popularity as a tourist attraction. The Frank Lloyd Wright Foundation began planning major renovations and a visitor center in the late 20th century. Parts of Taliesin West were gradually renovated and upgraded during the early 21st century.

Taliesin West consists of multiple structures, which are arranged on a 45-degree grid and connected by courtyards and walkways. The walls are made of desert masonry, a mixture of local rocks and concrete, which were originally topped by wood-and-canvas roofs. Triangles, hexagons, and natural motifs are used throughout the interiors. The main building includes a drafting room, kitchen, dining room, garden court, and the Wright family residence. The complex also includes spaces such as a kiva room, two performance venues, and a cottage. Over the years, commentators have praised the architecture, particularly the materials and the complex's relation to nature.

== Site ==
Taliesin West is located at 12621 North Frank Lloyd Wright Boulevard within Maricopa County in Scottsdale, Arizona, United States; the main entrance is at 12345 North Taliesin Drive. The modern estate covers 491 acres (199 ha) and has flowers planted along its border. Originally, Taliesin West was reached by an access road measuring about 1.75 miles (2.82 km) long. There was a masonry gate and a stanchion partway along the road. The end of the road, just outside the main buildings, has a landscaped median. An array of 4,000 solar panels is installed on the estate, near the base of a hill. The estate sits about 1,600 feet (490 m) above sea level, in a gully at the base of the McDowell Mountains. Nearby are the McDowell Mountains' two highest peaks: Thompson Peak and McDowell Peak. The surrounding desert contains volcanic rock that ranges in color from red and umber to blue-gray and purple. The estate overlooks the cities of Tempe and Chandler to the south, the Phoenix Mountains to the southwest. The Central Arizona Project canal passes by the estate as well.

Before the American architect Frank Lloyd Wright acquired the site, the land had never been developed, although several Native American peoples inhabited the surrounding area until the 19th century. Some of the boulders throughout the complex contain Native American petroglyphs, which were created by the Hohokam people. Native American millstones, pits with corn, and potsherds were still in situ when Wright obtained the land. One of the petroglyphs, representing "handshake, friendship, and fellowship", later inspired Taliesin West's official logo. According to a 2020 survey, Taliesin West contains 64 documented petroglyphs, some of which were integrated into the architecture of Taliesin West. During Wright's occupancy, nine petroglyph-bearing boulders were relocated onto the Taliesin West campus, while an additional nine remain in the original location near Taliesin Peak.

== History ==
After years of practicing architecture in the U.S. state of Illinois, Frank Lloyd Wright built an architectural studio, Taliesin, in 1911 near Spring Green, Wisconsin. Its living quarters were rebuilt twice following fires in 1914 and 1925. Wright formed the Taliesin Fellowship in 1932, inviting young architects to apprentice under him.

=== Development ===
Wright had first visited the state of Arizona in 1927 while working as a consultant for the Arizona Biltmore Hotel. He returned with several draftsmen in 1929 to establish the Ocotillo Desert Camp, a temporary camp in Phoenix, Arizona, while designing a resort for the developer Alexander J. Chandler. The Ocotillo Camp was built around a plateau, on a grid of 30- and 60-degree angles. Though rising heat prompted Wright's team to leave the camp after only a few months, it was a precursor to the design of Taliesin West. Wright later wrote that he had found the camp's canvas tents to be "enjoyable and sympathetic to the desert", in contrast to the "much too heavy midwestern house", which he found oppressive. Furthermore, Wright was elderly and in declining health, and the original studio was costly to maintain during the winter.

==== Site acquisition ====
Wright announced in late 1934 that he would bring his apprentices to the hot Arizona deserts during early 1935. Wright contacted Alexander Chandler, who invited the Taliesin fellows to stay at one of his properties, La Hacienda. The fellows worked at La Hacienda from January to April 1935. Wright also attempted to buy land in Arizona during that trip, visiting a 640-acre (260 ha) site southeast of Chandler, which was owned by a farmer named Dewey Keith. Following the fellowship's 1935 trip to Arizona, Wright resolved to develop his own studio in the desert. Wright's wife Olgivanna preferred Arizona to the original Taliesin studio, whose landscape she disliked. After catching pneumonia in 1936, Wright went to see a doctor, who advised him to stay in the Arizona desert during the winter. Taliesin fellows returned to Arizona in 1936, staying at La Hacienda. During that trip, Wright attempted to buy some federal land near the San Tan Mountains, but he needed another parcel from Keith to obtain a site of sufficient size. Ultimately, Wright could not acquire the land from Keith, and the apprentices and Olgivanna opposed that site as too remote.

In December 1937, Frank and Olgivanna Wright found a site near McDowell Peak, 26 miles (42 km) from Phoenix. Wright obtained about 320 acres (130 ha) in Paradise Valley, leasing half the land and buying the rest outright. (Note: Sources describe Wright as having bought 600 acres (240 ha) or 800 acres (320 ha) of land. However, according to Neil Levine, the estate did not grow to 800 acres until later.) He later recalled, "On the mesa just below McDowell Peak we stopped, turned, and looked around. The top of the world", saying the landscape was unparalleled in "sheer beauty of space and pattern". Wright had paid $3.50 per acre ($8.6/ha) with a $3,100 check from Herbert Fisk Johnson Jr., for whom Wright was designing the Johnson Wax Headquarters in Racine, Wisconsin. The site was particularly cheap because it was not known to contain any groundwater. Although a local had warned him that it was a "waste of money" to look for groundwater on the site, Wright paid a digger to excavate a well; the digger ultimately discovered water 484–486 ft (147.5–148.1 m) underground. Wright ended up spending $10,000 on the well, more than what he had paid for the land itself. The well was not completed for three years; it was supplied by a subterranean river and remains in use in the 21st century.

==== Temporary camp and planning ====
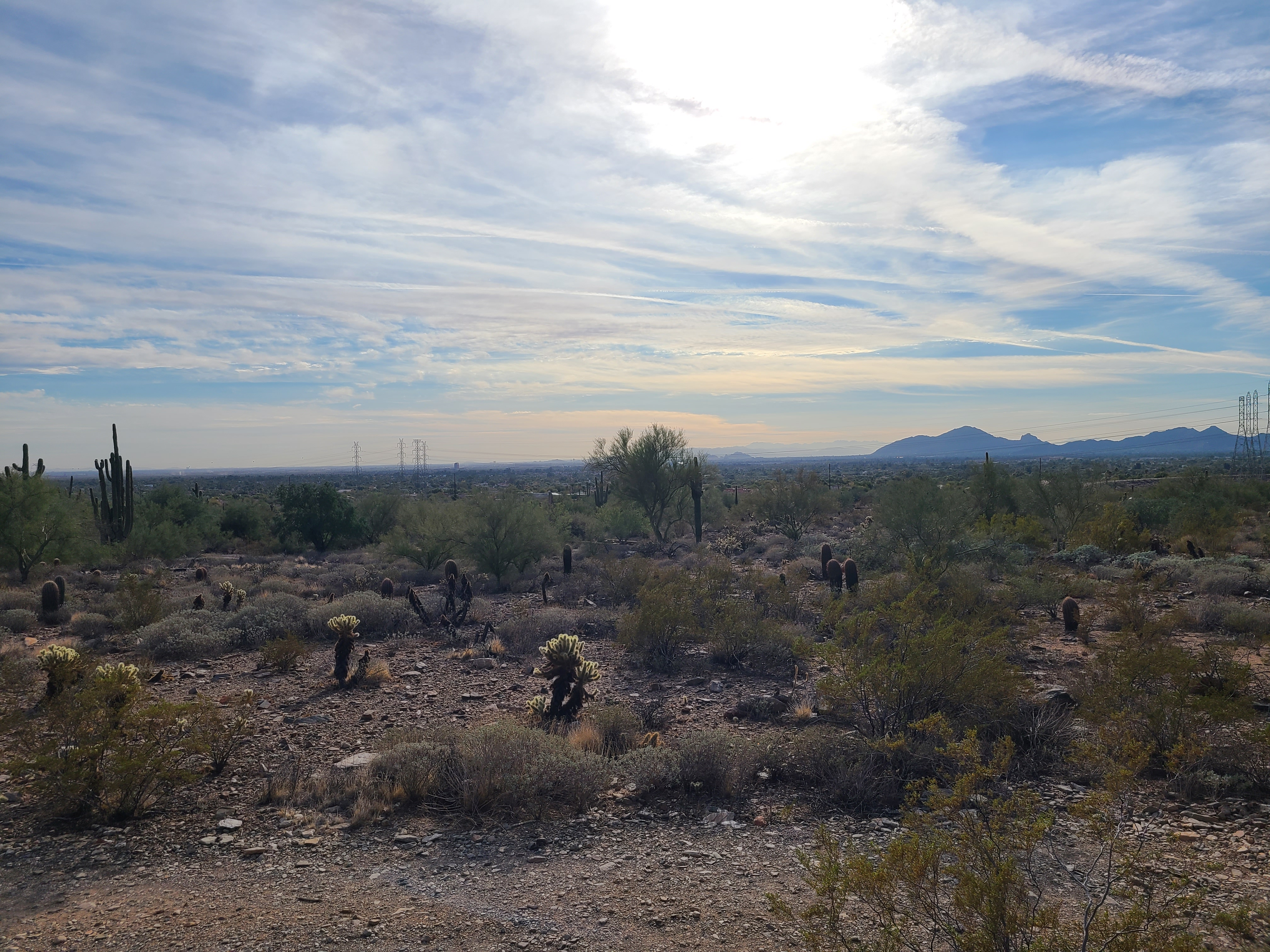
The site was completely undeveloped when Wright and his apprentices arrived in 1938.

At the end of December 1937, Wright asked his secretary Gene Masselink in Wisconsin to bring housekeeping supplies, construction supplies, drafting boards, and musical instruments for entertainment. When the apprentices arrived at McDowell Peak in early 1938, they found a site that was completely undeveloped; as apprentice Kay Schneider said, there was "no water, no building, nothing". Apprentices had to carry water from several miles away. Schneider recalled that, before the well was finished, the apprentices obtained water from a local farmer once a week, receiving one U.S. gallon (3.8 L) to wash themselves for the entire week. The fellowship had little money on hand, so they were forced to ration meat and subsist on cottage cheese and grapefruit from a local farm. Another apprentice, Edgar Tafel, reflected that there was no phone service, a rudimentary septic system, and a portable power generator. Yet another apprentice, Larry Lemmon, built an earthen closet in which to store food.

Wright decided to construct the camp on a mesa near McDowell Peak's base, at the southwestern corner of the parcel that he owned. The first apprentices built their own tents using lumber and canvas. They set up sleeping bags, which surrounded the mesa to the south and west. The Wrights initially stayed at a nearby inn. The apprentices designed a temporary accommodation for the Wrights, known as Sun Trap, which was made of wood and canvas. The design of Sun Trap was derived from that of the Ocotillo camp, as well as Wright's unexecuted design for a house in the Mojave Desert in 1921. It consisted of a courtyard with bedrooms on three sides and a fireplace on the fourth side, surrounded by pieces of wooden siding. There was a bathroom in one corner and a music room in another corner; the other two corners were exposed to the elements. The bedrooms had sleeping boxes placed atop concrete pedestals, which Olgivanna loved despite their rudimentary nature.

Wright began drawing up plans for permanent structures soon after erecting the temporary accommodations. To reduce glare, he sketched the initial plans on butcher paper, since all the planning was initially done outdoors. In designing the complex, Wright wanted to blur the distinction between the buildings and the ground, giving the impression that the structures grew from the desert floor. He did not create standard blueprints; as one apprentice said, "I think that sometimes what was drawn one day was built the next." The early plans called for a collection of buildings surrounding a courtyard, accessed from the west and rotated 30 degrees clockwise from due south. At the front of the site was the drafting room, the Wrights' residence, and a pergola to the courtyard; there were two additional wings behind the courtyard. Wright subsequently revised the plans further, placing the buildings on a 45-degree grid. The final plans called for five spaces—a drafting room, a courtyard, an office, the Wrights' residence, and workshops—arranged around a pergola.

==== Construction ====
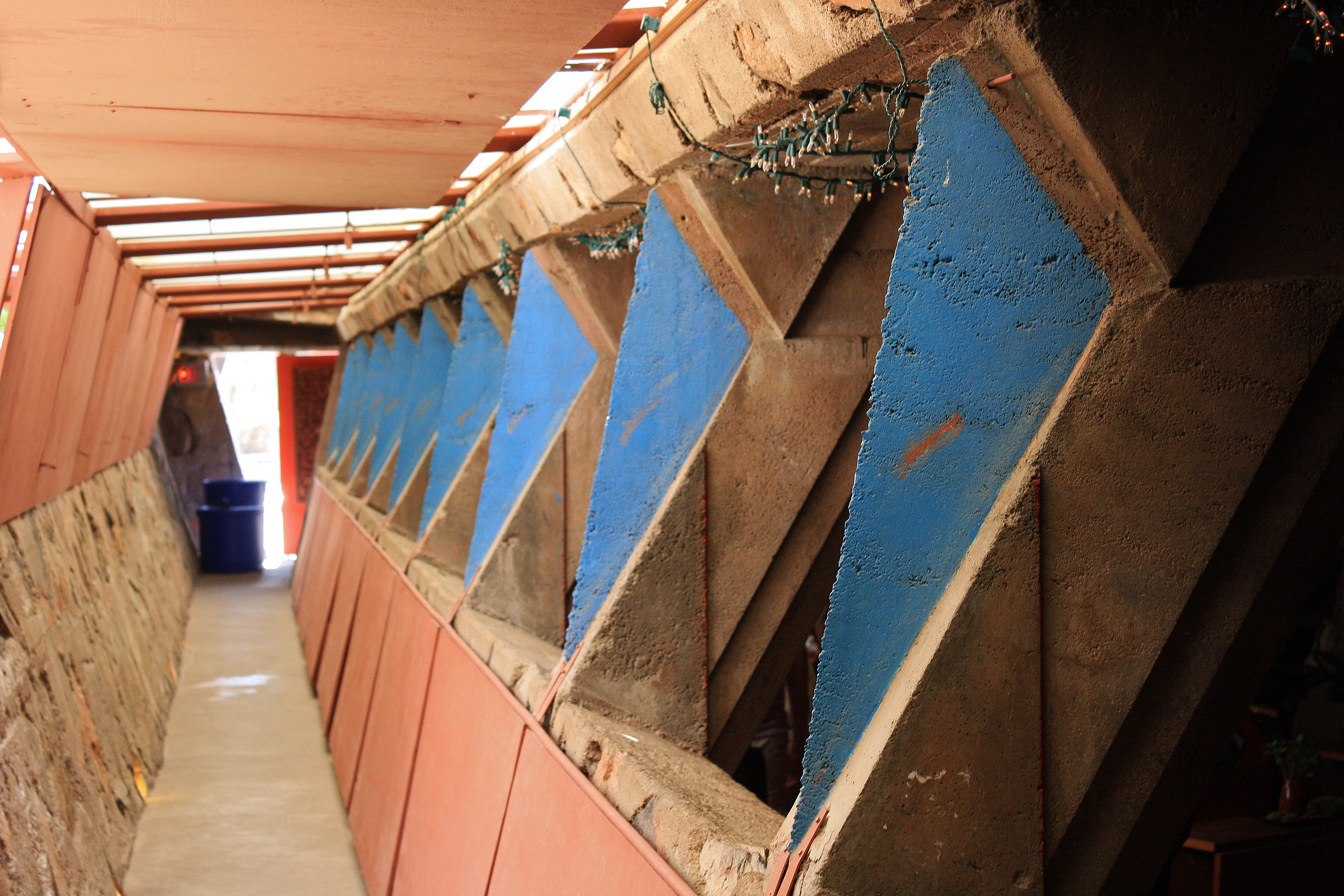
A hallway at Taliesin West

Wright's apprentices spent initially seven months of the year at Taliesin in Wisconsin and the other five months at Taliesin West. Frank and Olgivanna Wright led "caravans" between the two studios, taking a different route every year. Because the land was so arid, the apprentices had difficulties excavating the foundations. During their first year at Taliesin West, the Taliesin fellows spent much of their time constructing these structures, rather than learning. Tafel recalled that rattlesnakes became more common as the days got warmer, while heavy rain sometimes cascaded down the arroyos on the site. In a contemporary article for The Arizona Republic, an unidentified fellow said that much of the heavy-duty construction work was performed by "the boys of the fellowship", while the female fellows made the furnishings.

During 1938, the apprentices graded many of the paths and created the foundations for the buildings. The fellowship returned to Taliesin West in January 1939. Almost all building materials, except for cement, were extracted from the surrounding area. Wright decided to construct the buildings from a mixture of rock and cement, which was poured into wooden formwork or framing. The roofs were to be constructed of canvas sheets stretched between redwood frames. The interior was to be decorated with pieces of local quartzite, which came in a variety of colors and sometimes weighed several hundred pounds. Because the quartzite was not easy to chisel away, the apprentices had to look for pieces that already had flat surfaces. Wright decided to reposition the petroglyphs so that "when the Indians come back 2,000 years from now to claim their land, they will note we had respect for their orientation".

The vault was the first structure to be built. The apprentices built the masonry walls for the vault and kitchen, at either end of the main structure. In late 1938, workers began constructing the drafting room. Apprentices were also constructing the dining room, kitchen, kiva, sleeping quarters, and Wright's office by early 1939. Some of the apprentices stayed behind in mid-1939 to construct the rest of the structure. Many of these initial rooms were finished by 1940. During that year, a canvas covering was placed on the drafting room's roof. The original compound was substantially complete in early 1941, though The Arizona Republic wrote that "it may be years before it is considered finished". Additional rooms including the garden room, guest desk, apprentices' court, and the Wrights' residence were completed at that time.

=== Wright usage ===
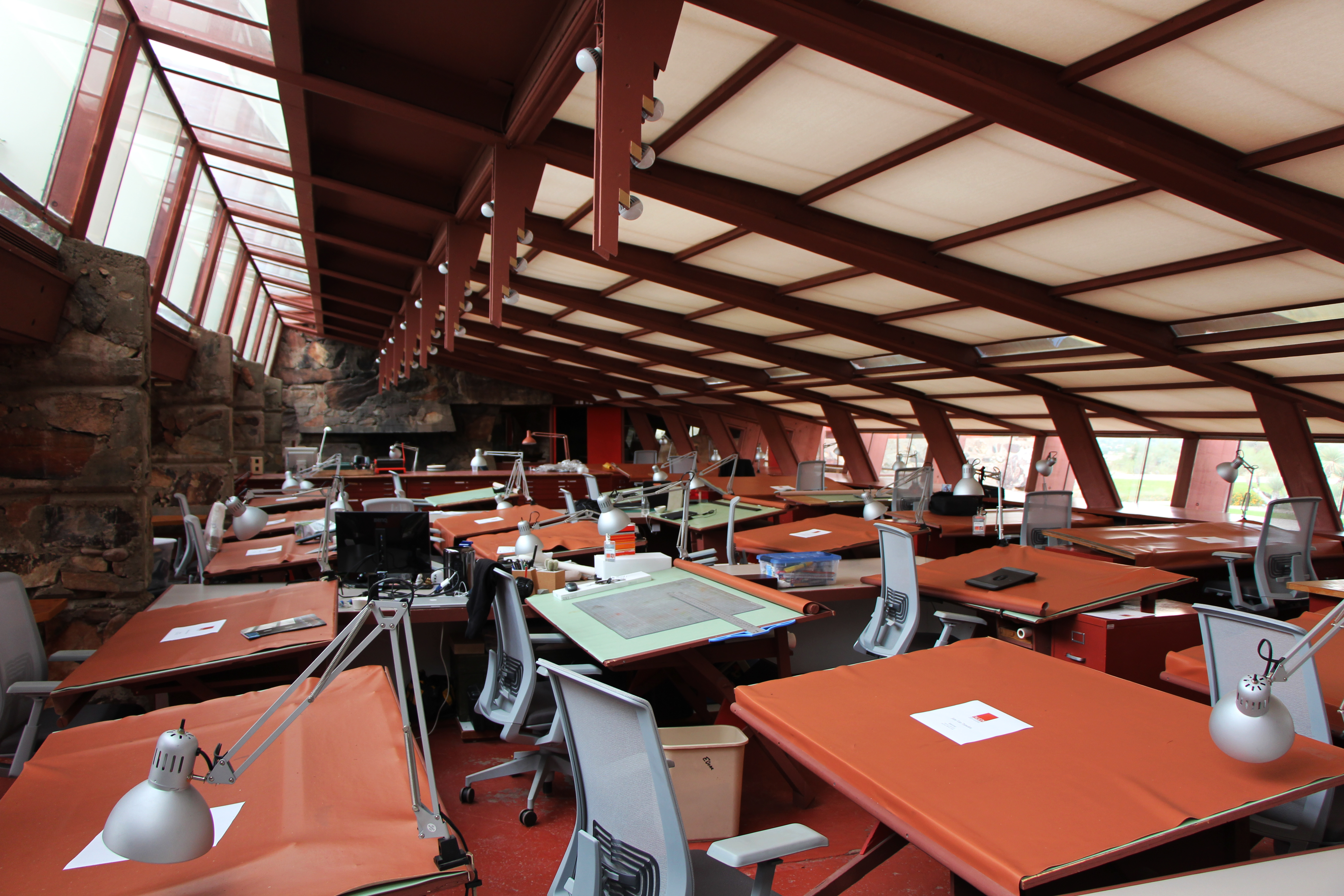
The drafting room

The Arizona complex became known as "Taliesin West", contrasting with the original compound in Wisconsin, which became "Taliesin East". The original structure, in turn, had been named for the Welsh bard Taliesin, whose name means "shining brow" or "radiant brow". In contrast to Wright's other projects, Taliesin West had not gained its name until after most of the initial structures were completed. The apprentices had thought of several names for the complex, such as "Aladdin" and "Rockledge". Other alternate names, like "Taliesin in the Desert" and "Desert Camp", also failed to gain popularity. The writer Neil Levine states that Taliesin West "assumed the role of defining Wright's architecture and persona to the outside world", supplanting the original studio in some respects, while The New York Times characterized the structures as a "countercultural colony".

Wright designed many of his later structures while at Taliesin West, such as the Price Tower, Monona Terrace, Gammage Memorial Auditorium, and Solomon R. Guggenheim Museum. Up to 100 Taliesin Fellowship apprentices worked there during the winters, and they performed many tasks there, per Wright's belief that they should learn through experience. For instance, they erected temporary shelters in the desert nearby, which Wright then critiqued. The apprentices adhered to a detailed schedule, starting with a 6:30 a.m. breakfast, though their clocks were deliberately set one hour ahead. The apprentices took turns maintaining the estate and doing tasks such as cooking and gardening. A bell tower in the main building marked when it was time to eat. Apprentices cooked meals in the kitchen, which they then ate in the communal dining room. Wright was reportedly a difficult teacher to work with, though his onetime apprentice Rudolph Schindler said: "Yet I believe that a year in his studio would be worth any sacrifice." On weekends, the estate was open to tourists for $5 each.

==== 1940s ====
Wright continually made modifications to Taliesin West, directing his students to carry out these changes. Just before World War II, Wright planted native cacti on the grounds. Taliesin West's completion coincided with the onset of World War II, and as such, few changes were made to the buildings during the war, other than basic maintenance. Following the United States' entry into World War II in 1941, some of Wright's fellows were drafted into the U.S. military, while others were imprisoned after refusing to be conscripted. The remaining apprentices left Taliesin West largely unused until 1945, instead staying in Wisconsin. One apprentice, Kenn Lockhart, offered to repair the complex and protect it from vandalism. Wright also rented out Taliesin West to the U.S. military, and cattle sometimes roamed onto the land.

Following World War II, Wright began experimenting with alternate materials, adding glass and replacing some of the canvas and wood in the buildings. Olgivanna asked her husband to install glass in the structures. Pfeiffer states that Olgivanna had made the request after dreaming about seeing a storm from inside the complex. In any case, he added some glass to the garden room and drafting studios. Wright also expanded the dining room into an adjacent loggia, and he drew up plans to replace a footbridge between the family residence and the kiva. He replaced the original wood frames and fabric roofs because they decayed more quickly during the hot summers, when temperatures reached 110–115 °F (43–46 °C). The Sun Trap was demolished in 1949 and replaced with the Sun Cottage, a residence for the Wrights' daughter Iovanna. Air-conditioning units were installed, and the rooms were enclosed so the buildings could be occupied during the summer.

Also in the 1940s, Wright fought the installation of overhead power lines in the area, as he considered them ugly. He contacted U.S. president Harry S. Truman to complain about the power lines, unsuccessfully requesting that they be buried. After briefly considering relocating, Wright instead relocated the compound's main entrance and the living room. Wright wrote for Arizona Highways magazine in 1949 that "we've all learned a helluva lot by practice" while erecting Taliesin West.

==== 1950s ====
In the early 1950s, the compound's original theater (the kiva) became a library, while the Cabaret Theatre was built behind Wright's office. A report from 2015 notes that the Cabaret Theatre may have been ready for use as early as December 1950, though other sources state that the theater was not finished until 1951 or 1952. After the Cabaret Theatre was finished, the fellows often relaxed in the theater during the weekends, watching movies or live performances there. In addition, Taliesin West was linked to Scottsdale's electrical grid by early 1952. Starting in the early 1950s, Olgivanna hosted gatherings with other followers of the philosopher George Gurdjieff at Taliesin West during winter weekends. Wright stored his architectural medals in a tower on the estate.

Wright decided to relocate his firm's headquarters from the original Wisconsin studio to Taliesin West in 1954, as he did not want to pay taxes on the Wisconsin estate, even though he also paid taxes on the Arizona compound. The same year, work began on a larger theater on the grounds, which was intended to host musical performances. By then, Arizona Highways magazine claimed the estate earned hundreds of thousands of dollars per year for the state economy. The music pavilion next to the Cabaret Theatre (originally called the movements pavilion) was completed in 1957. Fellows listened to musical performances after dinner in the music pavilion, and the structure also hosted the Festival of Music and Dance. Olgivanna composed music for the theater, while Iovanna choreographed and directed the dance shows. In 1959, Wright drew up plans for an orchard, and Taliesin West's access road was reconfigured. When Wright died in Arizona that April, his associates hosted a memorial service for him at Taliesin West.

=== After Wright's death ===
After Wright's death, his son-in-law William Wesley Peters formed Taliesin Associated Architects, which was headquartered at Taliesin West and operated as part of the Frank Lloyd Wright Foundation. Wright's architectural school continued to operate from the complex as well, enrolling no more than 35 students at a time. Olgivanna Wright took over Taliesin West's operations and management, approving every major change to Taliesin West, including the designs of students' tents. Iovanna still lived in the Sun Cottage and choreographed performances at the music pavilion, inviting apprentices to participate. The nearby Cabaret Theatre hosted formal dinners and film screenings on Saturdays. Apprentices had to attend lectures on Sundays and construction courses during the mornings. They spent the rest of their time maintaining the buildings, working on designs, or constructing structures. Taliesin West's communal lifestyle did not suit everyone: for instance, Peters's second wife Svetlana Alliluyeva left him in part because she disapproved of the lifestyle.

Tourism to Taliesin West increased after Wright's death, even though the fellowship never promoted the structures. Tours were initially hosted on weekdays and Sundays, and they included a slideshow and photographs of Wright. Visitors included major figures such as the publisher Henry Luce and his wife Clare Boothe Luce; the politicians Allen Dulles, Adlai Stevenson II, John Kenneth Galbraith, and William Benton; the art collector Peggy Guggenheim; and the actor Charles Laughton.

Archival records of Taliesin Associated Architects, including materials related to major Arizona projects such as ASU's Gammage Memorial Auditorium, are held in university collections such as the Arizona State University Library's Special Collections. These collections hold drawings, photos, project files, and more from the firm established after Frank Lloyd Wright's death.

==== 1960s and 1970s ====
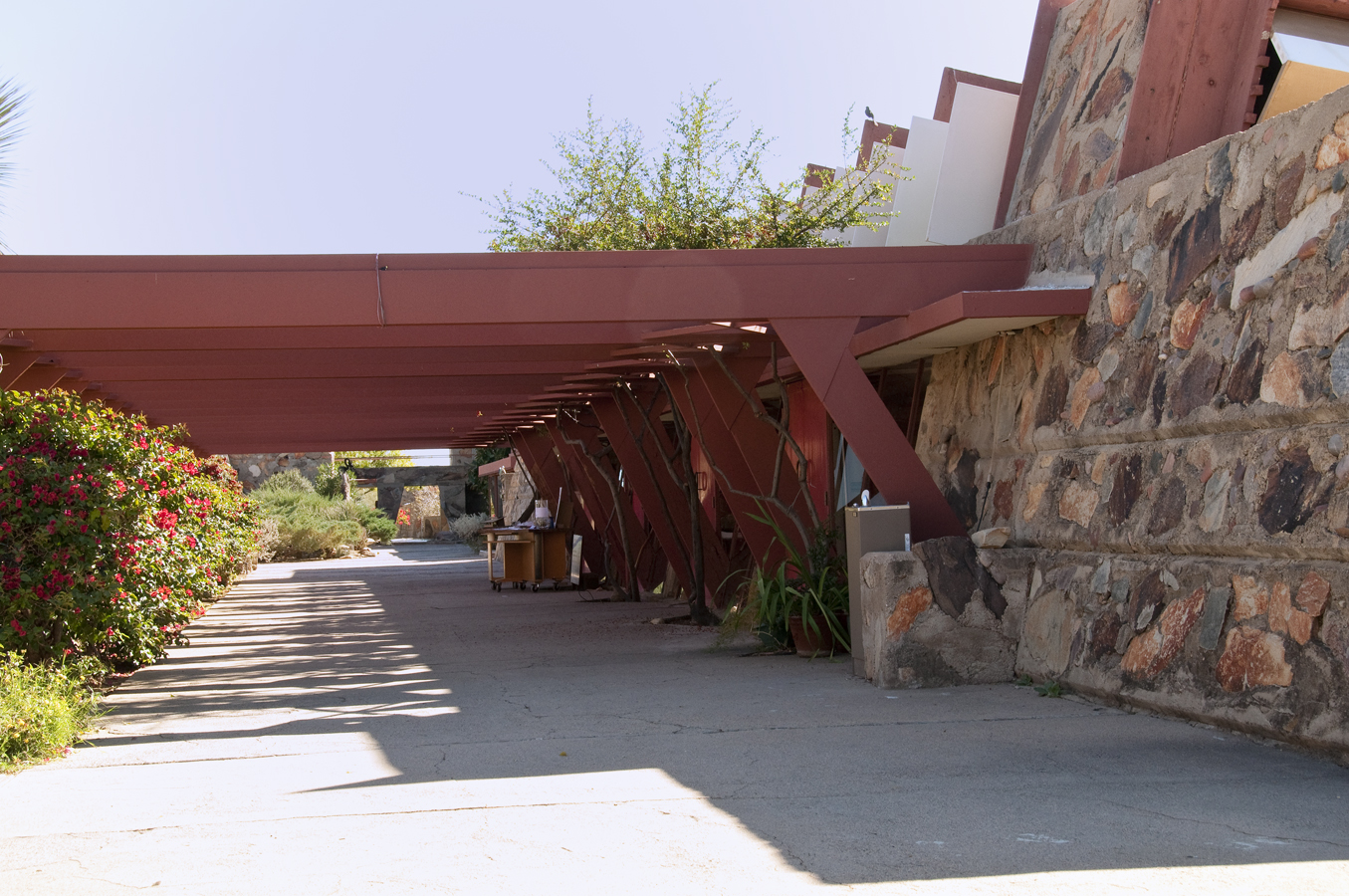
The pergola

Wright's apprentices continued to modify Taliesin West after his death, adding steel and glass to the structures. Although Olgivanna wanted to build an eastern wing, several of Wright's apprentices refused to help; one apprentice complained that Olgivanna had transformed her husband's "rugged, masculine, barbaric kind of a creation" into a feminine design. After plans to install power transmission lines next to the complex were announced in the 1960s, Olgivanna Wright wrote letters opposing the project, but the power lines were installed anyway. The original music pavilion was gutted and destroyed during a fire in September 1963. The blaze caused an estimated $150,000 in damage, destroying curtains, sets, and 300 costumes. Taliesin fellows quickly began repairing the pavilion following the fire, rebuilding the structure to one of Wright's old designs. After the fire, smoking was banned at Taliesin West as a precautionary measure. The music pavilion reopened in April 1965 with a performance choreographed by Iovanna Wright.

The complex had 1,500 monthly visitors by the mid-1960s. In July 1966, a fire destroyed several dormitories within the eastern section of the apprentices' court. The dormitories were rebuilt with a steel frame, and fiberglass roofs were also added above the garden room, Wright's office, and the drafting room during the 1960s. Many temporary materials, used in the construction of the original structures, were removed as a result. One newspaper writer said in 1967 that "virtually every part of the main building" had been replaced over the preceding five years. During the same decade, apprentices dug another well. By the end of the decade, there were plans to construct a storage vault for Wright's writings.

The guest terrace was reconstructed with a steel frame in 1970 after it began to sag. By then, the Scottsdale government was planning to annex the site of Taliesin West, which at the time was located in an unincorporated part of Maricopa County. The complex ultimately became part of Scottsdale in 1972. In addition, Taliesin West employed only people from within Taliesin Associated Architects or the fellowship until the early 1970s, when a small clerical staff was hired. New bedrooms, a clinic and doctor's residence, and the tower room were constructed east of Olgivanna's bedroom during this decade. The Fellowship Pool was built north of the apprentices' court as well, while large palm trees were replaced with smaller shrubs. The Arizona government also allocated some funding for the complex's maintenance.

==== 1980s ====
By the early 1980s, the complex had about 40,000 to 50,000 annual visitors. Olgivanna continued to host social events at Taliesin West, including afternoon teas, dinners, and performing-arts events. Apprentices built a ticket booth, a bookstore, a reading room, and a dormitory, and they also renovated several of the rooms. When Olgivanna died in 1985, she had been attempting to relocate Frank's remains to Taliesin West. Although Wright was originally interred in Wisconsin, Olgivanna had wanted herself, Wright, and her daughter from her first marriage to all be cremated and buried together at Taliesin West. Against the wishes of other family members and the Wisconsin Legislature, Frank's remains were relocated to Scottsdale in 1985, where they were later reinterred.

In the mid-1980s, the Frank Lloyd Wright Foundation started digitizing Wright's archives, and it drew up plans for a study center and an archive building. In addition, the foundation received permission to construct a housing development, Taliesin Gates, on an 74-acre (30 ha) plot adjoining the complex. The development was dedicated in 1986, and the sale of houses there was intended to raise money for the Wright Foundation. Taliesin Gates also provided a buffer between Taliesin West and the expanding Scottsdale suburbs, whose rapid growth had caused Taliesin West to be added to a list of endangered historical sites in 1984. Richard Carney, who led the Frank Lloyd Wright Foundation, began raising $10–20 million for repairs to both Taliesins. The foundation planned to raise $5 million for an archive building at Taliesin West by selling off some of Wright's original drawings, though these sales were controversial. In 1989, Carney converted Olgivanna's bedroom into an office.

==== 1990s and 2000s ====
View of the main building, looking northeast from the pool

During the early 1990s, the garden room was renovated, and Wright's archives were relocated to a climate-controlled warehouse on the estate. In the early 1990s, the consulting firm Coopers and Lybrand conducted a feasibility study, which predicted that Taliesin West could increase its annual visitation to 250,000 if the Frank Lloyd Wright Foundation built a visitor center and a model of a Usonian house. At the time, the complex had 60,000 annual visitors. Subsequently, Scottsdale officials approved a $699,000 complex to help fund the construction of the visitor center, which was planned to cost $3.9 million. However, the construction of the visitor center was delayed. According to Taliesin West's vice president Arnold Roy, the initial design, based on an unexecuted plan for a house in California, "was too institutional". An increase in visitors prompted the Wright Foundation to increase tours of the house in 1996. Annual visitation had increased to 72,000. The foundation established an endowment fund for Taliesin West in the 1990s, but the endowment was insufficient to finance any long-term projects.

In 1998, the roofs of the garden room, office, and drafting room were rebuilt, and the old roof panels were replaced with acrylic panels. The structures east of the Wrights' residence were also converted into offices for the Frank Lloyd Wright Foundation. The same year, Ken Burns released a documentary on Wright's work, which increased visitation even more, with up to 12,000 monthly visitors during peak times. In addition, the Frank Lloyd Wright Foundation began giving tours of apprentices' shelters. By the early 2000s, the foundation was planning to construct a visitor center with $1.4 million from the Scottsdale city government. The complex accommodated 120,000 annual visitors, the vast majority of whom came from outside the surrounding area. The foundation estimated that a visitor center would help increase annual visitation to 200,000. Part of the visitor center's cost was to be financed through Wright Foundation fundraisers. Foundation officials requested a further $430,000 from the Scottsdale government in 2002, which would pay for the visitor center's construction, a restoration of the Wrights' living space, and rent for a museum space in downtown Scottsdale. (Note: The museum opened in downtown Scottsdale in November 2003.)

In 2003, the Wright Foundation received a $75,000 grant for restoration through the Save America's Treasures program, and the Ottosen family donated another $200,700 for the renovation. The Wright Foundation hired the architect John Eifler, to study the property, which needed $30–60 million in renovations. Eifler and architect Arnold Roy designed a restoration of Wright's bedroom, which began in January 2004 and was completed that November. The bedroom's renovation was funded with more than $500,000 from Scottsdale's government. The Frank Lloyd Wright Foundation sought to rezone part of its campus in 2006 as part of a longer-range preservation plan for the complex. Though the Scottsdale government approved the rezoning, the preservation plan was delayed for several months. The Scottsdale government approved the complex's preservation plan in 2008. Attendance declined following the late 2000s recession but recovered in the 2010s.

==== 2010s to present ====
The Wright Foundation began renovating the living room in the early 2010s. The foundation also began installing solar panels across the complex in 2012 to reduce energy costs. Several local firms installed the panels, which were completed that May. In February 2014, the Frank Lloyd Wright Foundation hired the restoration architect Gunny Harboe to create a master plan for Taliesin West; Harboe's firm had previously helped restore the Robie House and other structures designed by Wright. At the time, the estate had 100,000 annual visitors. It cost the foundation millions of dollars to maintain Taliesin West, which needed a new roof, new mechanical systems, and repairs to water-damaged portions of the buildings. After conducting an 18-month study of the estate, Harboe announced a master plan in October 2015, which called for restoring the original buildings and repairing damaged infrastructure. The foundation had raised $2.1 million for emergency repairs and planned to obtain another $4.1 million. The master plan also entailed reserving part of the complex as an educational campus. The Wright Foundation planned to keep Taliesin West open to the public during renovations. The 2015 Taliesin West Preservation Master Plan documented systematic testing of desert-masonry repair methods, mortar stabilization strategies, and stone-selection protocols that continue to guide conservation work at the site.

To attract local visitors, in the late 2010s, the Wright Foundation expanded its education programs and began hosting performances. The National Endowment for the Humanities (NEH) announced in 2018 that it would give Taliesin West a $176,706 grant, provided the Wright Foundation raise $500,000. The Virginia G. Piper Charitable Trust and American Express also provided funds for new technology and programs at Taliesin West. The next year, NEH gave Taliesin West a $50,000 grant for upgrades to storage space.

Subsequently, the Frank Lloyd Wright Foundation began renovating parts of Taliesin West. Due to the COVID-19 pandemic, the complex was closed to the public for much of 2020, reopening that October with strict capacity restrictions. During the closure, multiple spaces were restored, including the dining cove and Sunset Terrace. The School of Architecture also moved out of Taliesin West the same year. Group tours resumed in March 2021, and the garden room was restored to its original appearance the same year. The foundation also began replacing the roof panels, and it also began making accessibility upgrades and replacing outdated sewers and water pipes. The accessibility renovations included upgraded paths and restrooms. In 2024, the Frank Lloyd Wright Foundation hired Sasaki Associates to design a new master plan for renovating Taliesin West. New lighting was installed the next year. A tourist was killed in 2026 when strong winds blew off part of a roof, prompting the Frank Lloyd Wright Foundation to add sensors and increase building inspections.

== Architecture ==
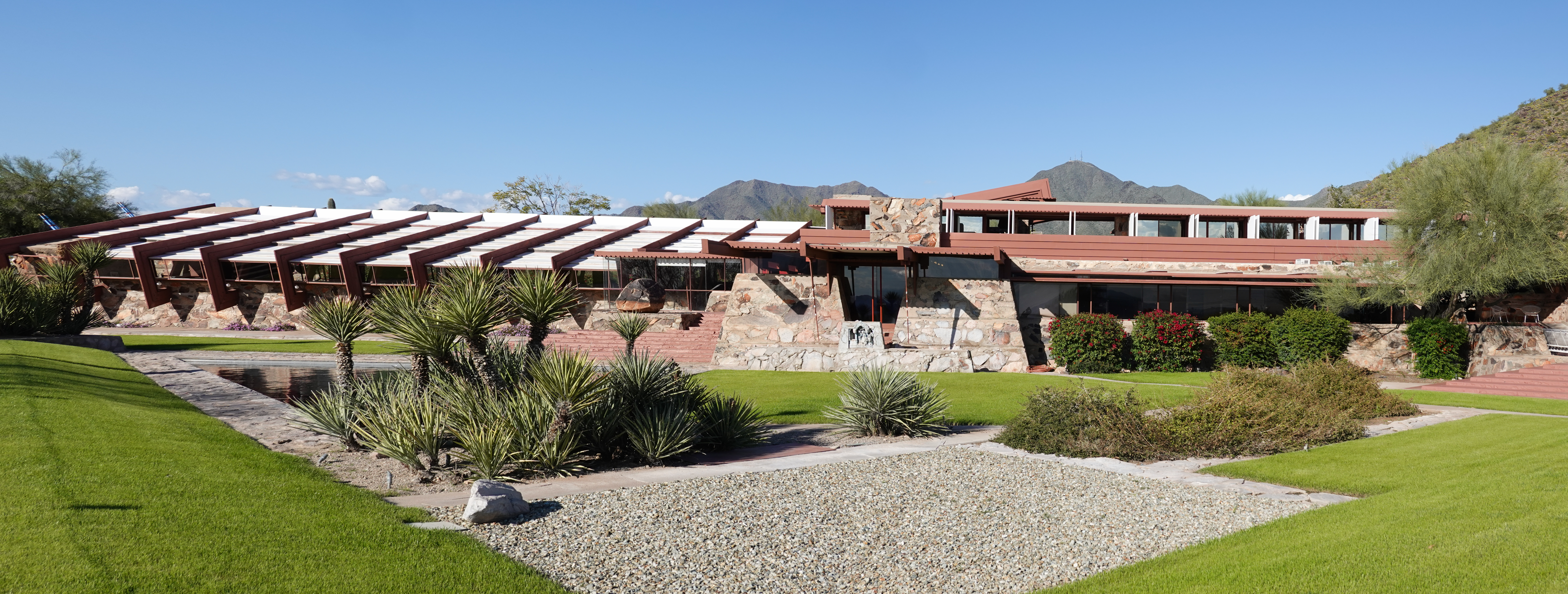
The main building's drafting room (left) and garden court (right) as seen from the southwest

Taliesin West consists of multiple structures connected by courtyards and walkways, many of which are aligned with landscape features such as Paradise Valley. The complex includes Wright's office, a drafting studio, living space, classrooms, and communal areas. The writer Neil Levine classifies the structures into two types: "pavilions", with masonry columns and wood-and-canvas roofs, and "caverns", which are comparatively more tightly enclosed.

The buildings were heavily inspired by the natural forms of the desert, and Wright wanted the structures on the site to be "sharp, clean and savage", similarly to the surroundings. Taliesin West's appearance contrasted with that of the original studio, which had smoother features because it was built into a rolling hill. Wright favored using locally sourced construction materials, rather than those that had to be transported to the site. In addition to local rocks, Wright used wood from trees in northern Arizona, and he made the fabric out of cotton grown in the state. In Wright's words, "There were simple characteristic silhouettes to go by, tremendous drifts and heaps of sunburned desert rocks were nearby to be used. We got it all together with the landscape..." The design included few vertical lines or right angles, as Wright opted to construct sloped walls and slanted pillars. The complex also has ribbed walls and gently sloped terraces, reflecting the appearance of the nearby mountains. Wright said of Taliesin West's design:

"Arizona needs its own architecture... Arizona's long, low, sweeping lines, uptilting planes. Surface patterned after such abstraction in line and color as find 'realism' in the patterns of the rattlesnake, the Gila monster, and the saguaro, cholla or staghorn—or is it the other way around—are inspiration enough."

Wright also decorated Taliesin West with art and furnishings, particularly Native American and Asian art. Olgivanna picked out Taliesin West's color palette, which included 57 hues of pink, in addition to shades of yellow and green. Inside, the rooms are painted in shades of red, including Wright's favorite color, a terracotta-tinted Cherokee red.

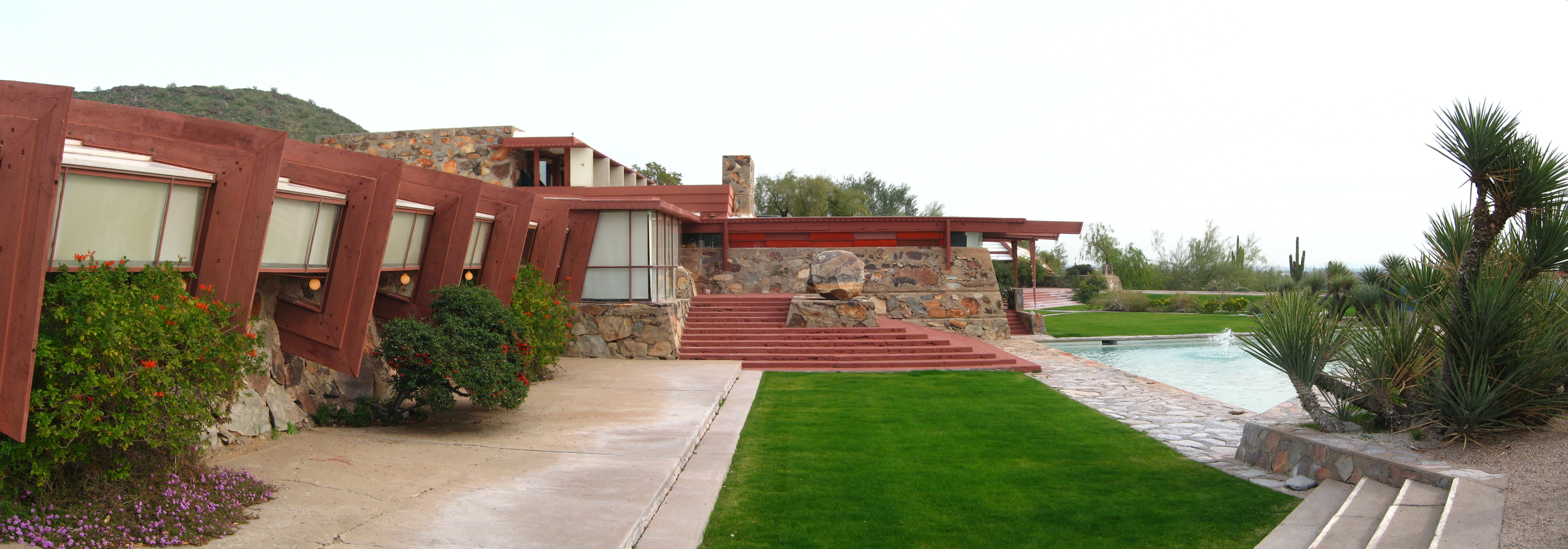
Taliesin West's main building, looking southwest from next to the drafting room

=== Primary structures ===
Taliesin West consists of three primary structures: the workshop, Wright's office, and the main building. Each structure is arranged around a grid of square 16-by-16-foot (4.9 by 4.9 m) modules, and the structures themselves contain wings that intersect at 45-degree angles. The workshop is the westernmost building in the complex; also known as the Shops, it connects with a locker room and a student lounge to its north. Southeast of the workshop is the main building. There is an office and studio to the north of the main building, along the same orientation as the workshop building. The Cabaret Theatre, the music pavilion, the planning library, storage room, and further workshops are all adjacent to the office and studio.

==== Exterior ====
The structures' walls are made of local desert rocks stacked within wooden formwork and filled with concrete. The apprentices labeled the rocks based on the manpower required to lift them, e.g. "two-man rocks". The material was referred to by several names, (Note: It was variously called "desert concrete", "desert rubble stone", or "desert masonry".) of which the term "desert masonry" was the most popular. The rocks were placed into the formwork, with the flat faces positioned outward, and concrete and smaller rocks were poured between the larger rocks; the excess masonry was then chopped off. To withstand the extreme temperatures, which ranged from −20 to 110 °F (−29 to 43 °C), the foundations are made of cement. The exteriors also include ramparts that blend into the landscape.

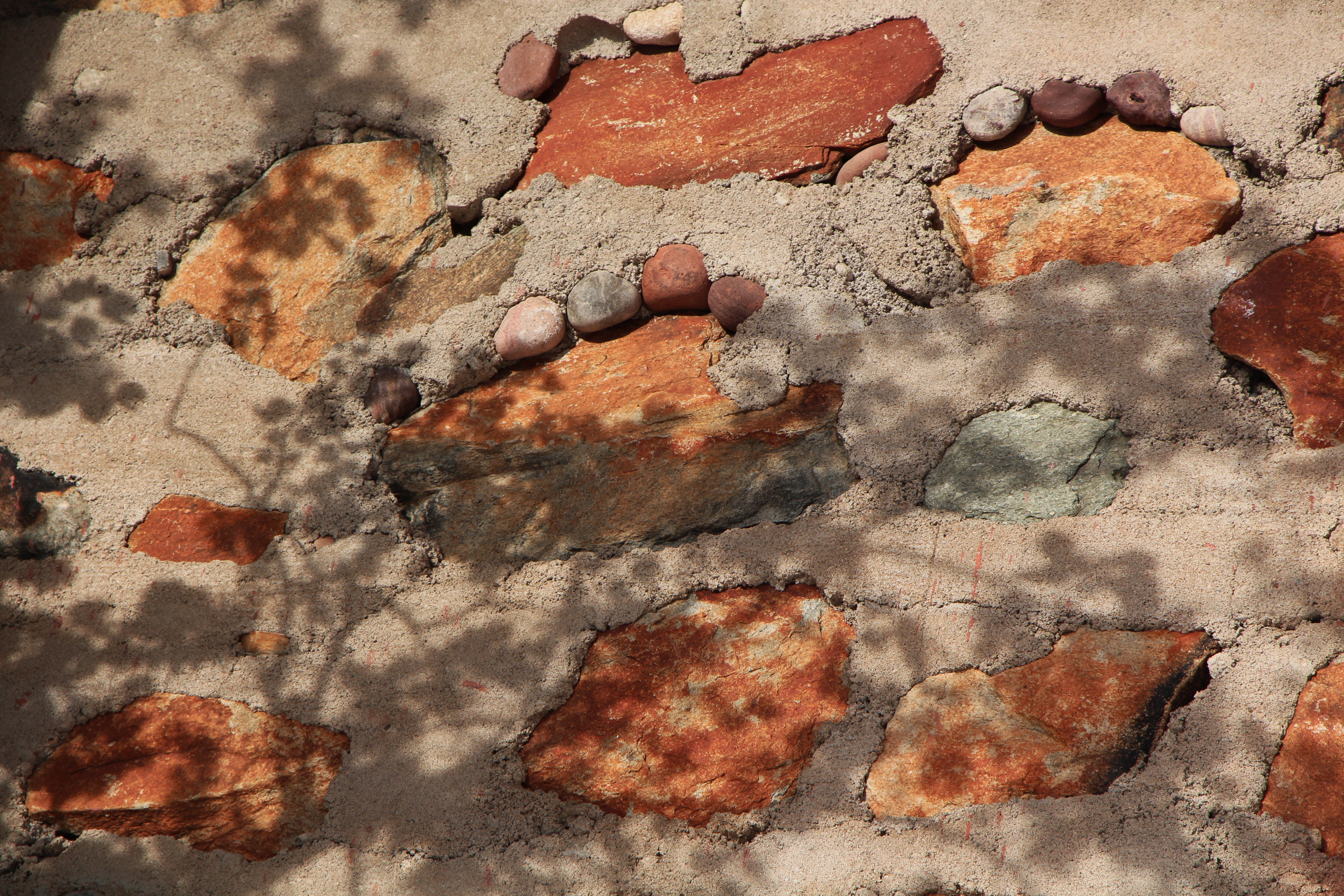
Desert masonry

The stone walls are mostly slanted inward at 15-degree angles. They are generally 2 to 10 feet (0.61 to 3.05 m) tall, and the upper portions of some walls are slanted outward or are vertically oriented. The angled walls, as designed, resembled the shapes of the nearby mountains and cast shadows throughout the day. Though the buildings' frames were originally constructed out of redwood, these were later supplemented with Cherokee-red steel. The walls also include decorations, such as Chinese ceramic panels salvaged from the second Imperial Hotel in Tokyo, as well as redwood cubes embedded into the fascia boards. There are also triangular indentations in some of the rocks, which were inspired by the grooves that Wright had seen in the walls of nearby canyons.

Wright wanted Taliesin West to function as a camp, and he regarded the buildings as "glorified tents". As such, the roofs were originally made of canvas panels. The roofs are pitched at a 15-degree angle so they would intersect perpendicularly with the redwood columns. The canvas sheets overlapped each other and could be moved to permit natural light to enter the rooms. Air passed under the canvas sheets whenever there was a breeze. The sheets ended up leaking after the building was completed, and the canvas sheets degraded rapidly in the summertime, prompting Wright to put the panels in storage during the summer. Wright, and later the Taliesin Fellowship, continued to modify the panels through the 20th century. Wright first tested out fiberglass or plastic panels, which were replaced with acrylic panels in 1998. There are trusses between the roof panes, which have a reddish-pink hue. Under the trusses are internal gutters, which collect rain from the roof.

==== Interior ====
Taliesin West includes about 50,000 square feet (4,600 m^{2}) of space. The rooms were oriented to maximize natural light and to prevent them from being permanently hot or cold based on which direction they faced. Triangular and hexagonal shapes are used throughout the rooms, as are natural motifs. The spaces have simple, organically designed furniture. which the Wrights frequently rearranged during their lifetimes.

On the main building's northeastern side is a pathway with an open pergola, which connects all the rooms. The pergola is sunken about 5 feet (1.5 m) and is partially covered by trellises. Fireplaces are scattered throughout, and the interiors are illuminated by natural light. The drafting room, kitchen, and dining room comprise the core rooms of the complex. The drafting room is at the northwest corner of the triangle, directly southwest of the pergola. The kitchen and dining room are near the center of the triangle, southeast of the drafting room. At the southeast corner of the triangle are the Wrights' apartments, an infirmary, and a garden room; these connect only to the pergola. Originally, each of the main building's rooms was exposed to the elements on at least one side, allowing air to flow in and out.

===== Workrooms =====
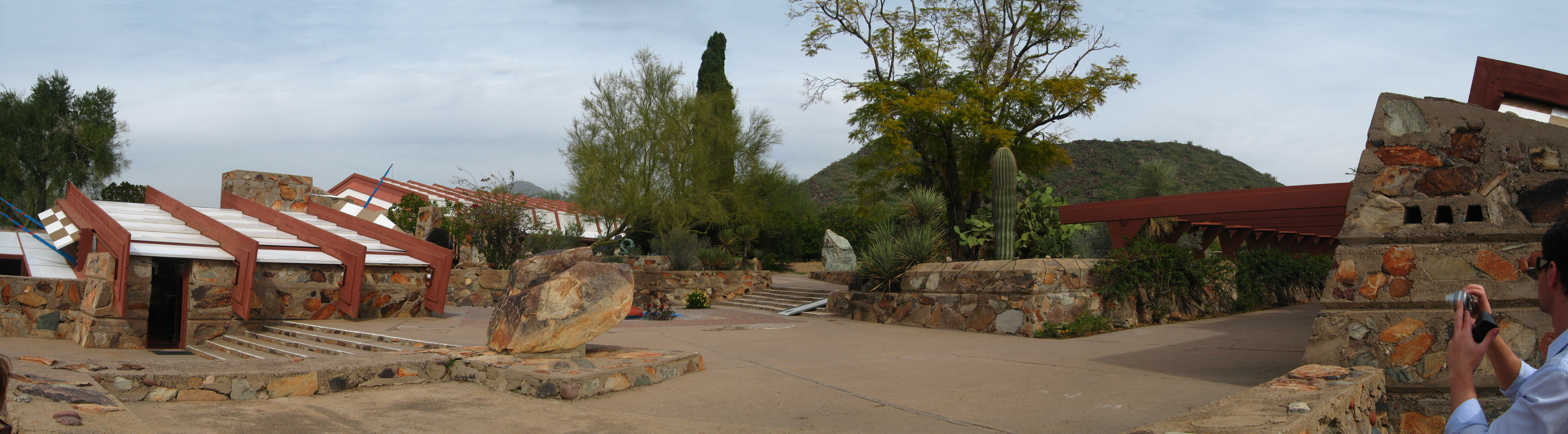
View of Taliesin West from the entrance court, with Wright's office to the left and the main building to the right

Wright's office is just past the entrance court. The office has a translucent ceiling, which is designed to resemble the canvas roofs that were originally used. It also had sloping walls and a large drafting table. After Wright's death, the office was turned into a reception room.

South of the office is the drafting studio, which was constructed from 1938 to 1941 and is rectangular in shape, with space for 60 worktables. It is slightly more than 100 feet (30 m) long, spanning about 6.5 modules. The drafting room is an open work space illuminated by natural light, and the tent-like structure allows air to pass through. The drafting studio's ceiling slopes upward from 6 to 13 feet (1.8 to 4.0 m). The northwestern end of the drafting studio abuts the vault, where Wright's architectural drawings were stored. The vault has since been converted into a computer lab. The southeastern wall abuts the kitchen wall and a fireplace, while the southwestern side opens onto Indian Rock Terrace.

===== Living areas =====
A northeast–southwest loggia separates the living quarters and the drafting studio, connecting the pergola with Sunset Terrace. The loggia was originally used as the entrance to the fellowship dining room and the Wrights' residence, although part of the loggia was later converted to dining space. The dining room itself (now the board room) measures 40 by 28 feet (12.2 by 8.5 m) and has a large stone fireplace. Three of the dining room's walls reach only partway to the ceiling, allowing sunlight to illuminate the space, A sculpture of a fire-breathing dragon stands outside the dining room. Immediately above the loggia, kitchen, and dining room is a guest terrace, which has several bedrooms, each with a small closet and bed. There is a bell tower between the dining room/loggia and the drafting studio. Additional bedrooms—for Gene Masselink, William Wesley Peters, and Peters's first wife Svetlana—are located east of the fellowship dining room.

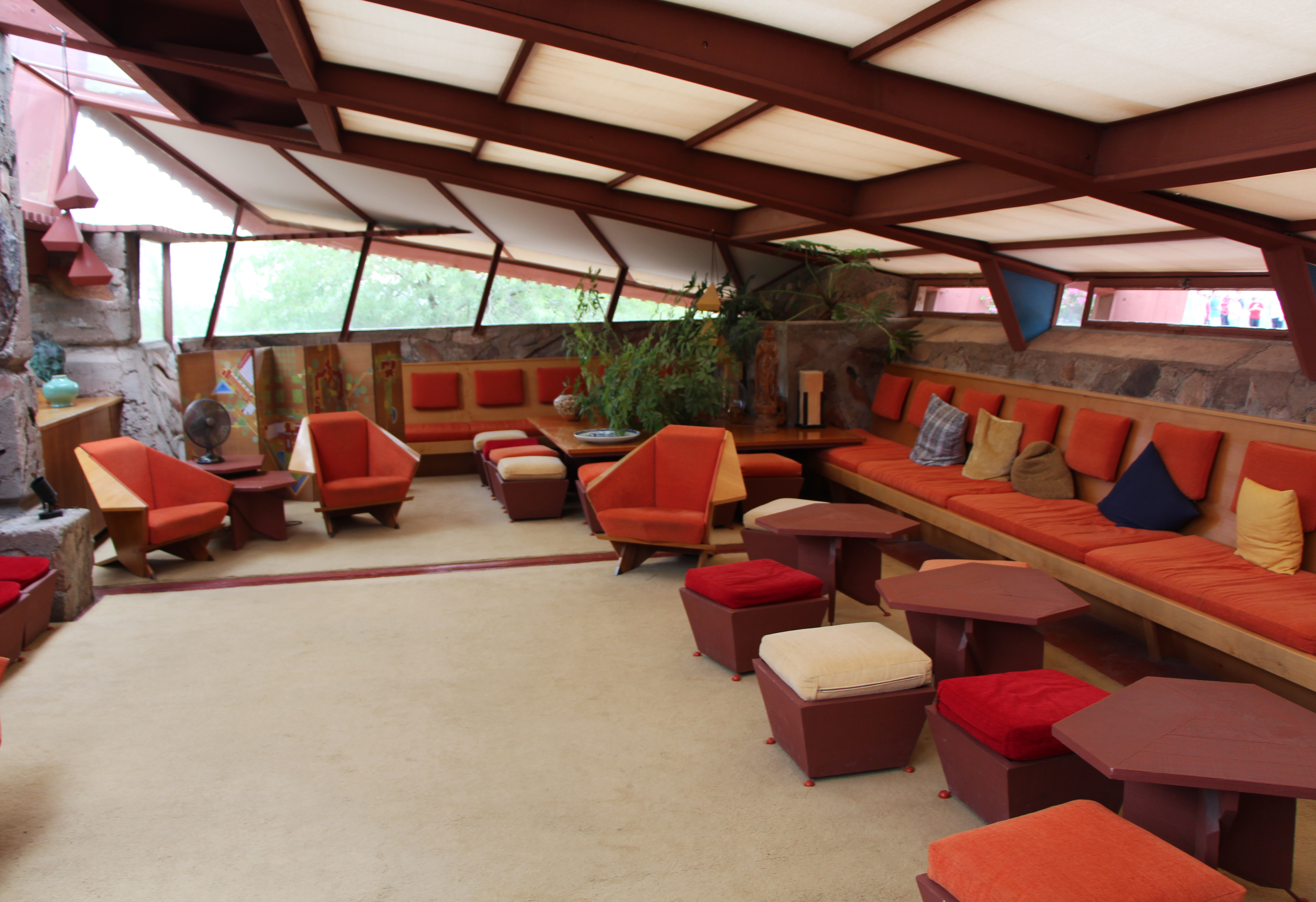
The garden room

The Wrights' former living quarters include a bathroom, a kitchen, three bedrooms, a garden room, and a small dining niche. The living quarters form an L shape; the bedrooms all face east, while the garden room faces south. The garden room, which served as the family's living room, is 56 by 34 feet (17 by 10 m) long and spans 3.5 modules. The garden room has a sloped roof with a low ceiling at its rear. A fireplace and an alcove occupy separate walls, and the rear wall has movable flaps. Within the garden room are a statue of the Chinese goddess Guanyin, a Pueblo pot, and a bust of Wright.

The family's personal rooms, occupying a wing measuring 114 by 20 feet (34.7 m × 6.1 m), are comparatively small. For instance, there is a sitting room called the Swan Cove, which measures 12 by 6 feet (3.7 by 1.8 m), while Frank Lloyd Wright's bedroom is 11 by 11 feet (3.4 by 3.4 m). The rooms include items such as Japanese art and replicas of Wright's books. The family's private dining niche has a sculpture of Maitreya, the future Buddha, as well as a pot from a New Mexican pueblo.

=== Other structures ===
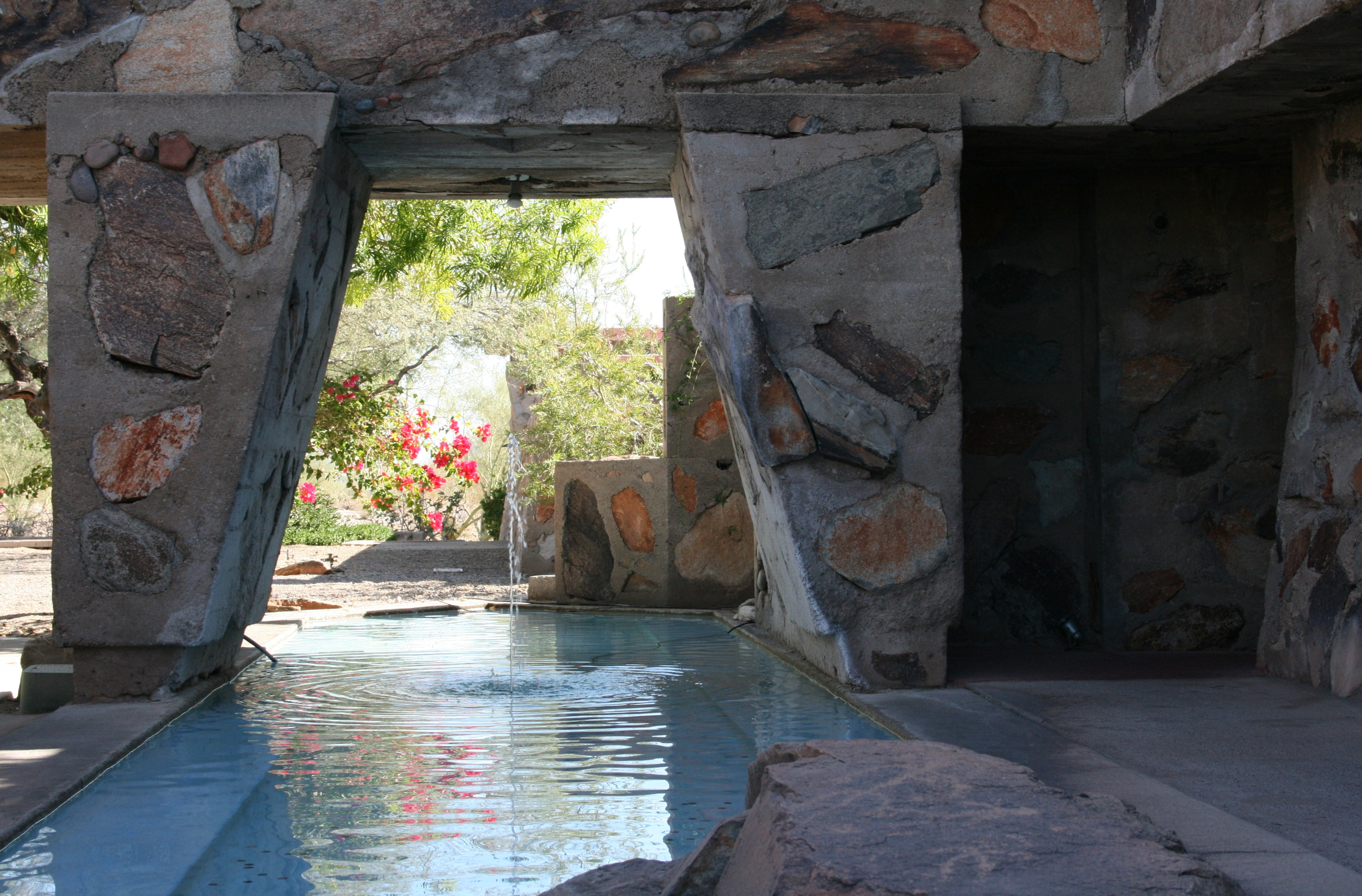
Taliesin West's reflecting pool, which is spanned by a bridge between the main building and the kiva

Next to the apprentices' court is a standalone masonry room called the kiva, which was named after a Pueblo Native American kiva and is partially underground. The kiva was initially connected to the Wrights' living quarters by a wooden bridge spanning a hexagonal reflecting pool, which was replaced in the 1940s. The newer bridge is a stone span supported by slanted piers, and there is a water tower next to the bridge. There are clerestory windows near the top of the kiva, which are slightly above ground level. The kiva has a concrete roof, which was supposed to be topped by an observatory. The kiva has been used for other purposes throughout its history, including as a library, and as a classroom and conference space.

Next to Wright's office is a performance space called the Cabaret Theatre, which dates from the early 1950s and was originally called the Stone Gallery. It is a rectangular space recessed into the ground and accessed by a narrow hallway. The Cabaret Theatre has about 100 seats, which are arranged in a tiered-seating layout with counters next to each seat. On the side walls are long benches with cabaret tables, while at the rear is a stone fireplace and a round table for 16 guests. The side benches, ceiling, and walls are made of desert masonry and reinforced concrete. There is also a projection booth, a fireplace, and removable wooden slats leading to a garden. The theater has a bust of the Buddha and a wooden carving from southeast Asia.

East of the Cabaret Theatre is a music pavilion, which has 135 seats. Unlike the complex's other structures, the music pavilion has a steel frame with plastic panels, which date to a 1964 reconstruction project.

The Sun Cottage is just east of the primary structures. The Sun Cottage has an atrium and an eastern wing and is connected to the rest of the complex by a bridge. The Sun Cottage, which replaced the Wrights' original Sun Trap, was built with slanted desert-masonry walls topped by glass clerestory windows, as well as an exposed steel-beam roof. Inside was a living room, kitchenette, bathroom, and bedroom for Iovanna Wright, in addition to a sitting room, bathroom, and two bedrooms for a guest.

There are several other outlying buildings. The Pfeiffer House, as well as a hexagonal women's dormitory, are located on the estate. First-year students of the School of Architecture lived nearby in tents measuring 8 by 8 feet (2.4 m × 2.4 m), though female students could choose to live in a dormitory instead. In the late 20th century, there were between 70 and 80 such tents at Taliesin West, and a facility manager had to approve the design of each tent. Faculty and upperclassmen could upgrade their shelters or stay in more permanent accommodations. Apprentices had to demolish their tents after they had graduated.

Taliesin West also houses the William Wesley Peters Library (established 1983), which contains one of the largest architecture-related collections in Arizona, with approximately 38,500 catalogued volumes. It is not open to the public but is used as a research library for Frank Lloyd Wright Foundation staff.

=== Courts and terraces ===
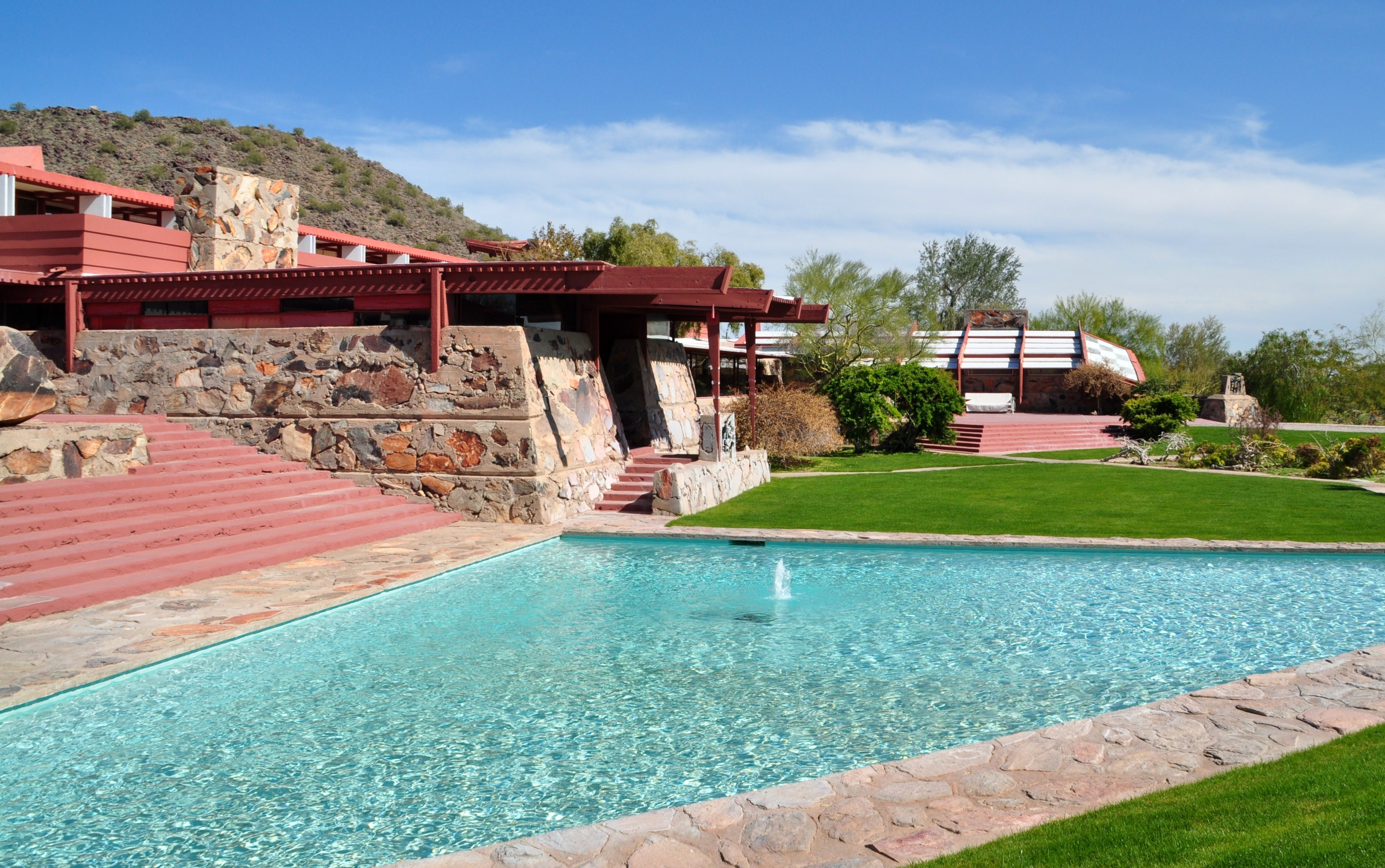
Eastward view of Sunset Terrace, looking over the pool toward the drafting room

The estate includes various plantings, pools, and several sunken gardens. Rocks with petroglyphs were incorporated into the buildings or placed throughout the complex as standalone objects. A parking lot is located southwest of the workshop building and Wright's office. An open courtyard leads southeast from the workshop to the main building. Along the edges of the court is a stone tablet with the name "Taliesin West" and a light tower tilted at a 15-degree angle. A boulder with a petroglyph is placed between the tablet and the light tower.

Directly south of the open courtyard, on the western and southern sides of the main building, is a prow-shaped terrace, which is known as Sunset Point or Sunset Terrace. At the terrace's northern tip, the main building's dining and drafting rooms wrap around Indian Rock Terrace. Within Indian Rock Terrace is a stepped pyramid, which is topped by a boulder with petroglyphs. A triangular pool stands in front of Indian Rock Terrace, while the rest of Sunset Terrace consists of a lawn. The pool was intended as a reservoir in case the buildings caught fire, and it is supplied by groundwater from Taliesin West's original well.

The apprentices' court is at the southeast corner of the main building and is surrounded by the apprentices' bedrooms. A square protrudes from the eastern corner of the apprentices' court, rotated 45 degrees from the rest of the court. To the northeast of the main building is a garden court with a citrus grove. The apprentices' court consists of a courtyard surrounded by bedrooms. There were 11 men's bedrooms, 3 women's bedrooms, and bathrooms and showers for apprentices of both genders. These bedrooms housed apprentices prior to World War II and have fireplaces and canvas flaps. There is also a sculpture garden with artwork by Heloise Crista, a onetime apprentice to Wright. A citrus grove stands to the northeast of the main building.

Bronze sculptures by Heloise Crista
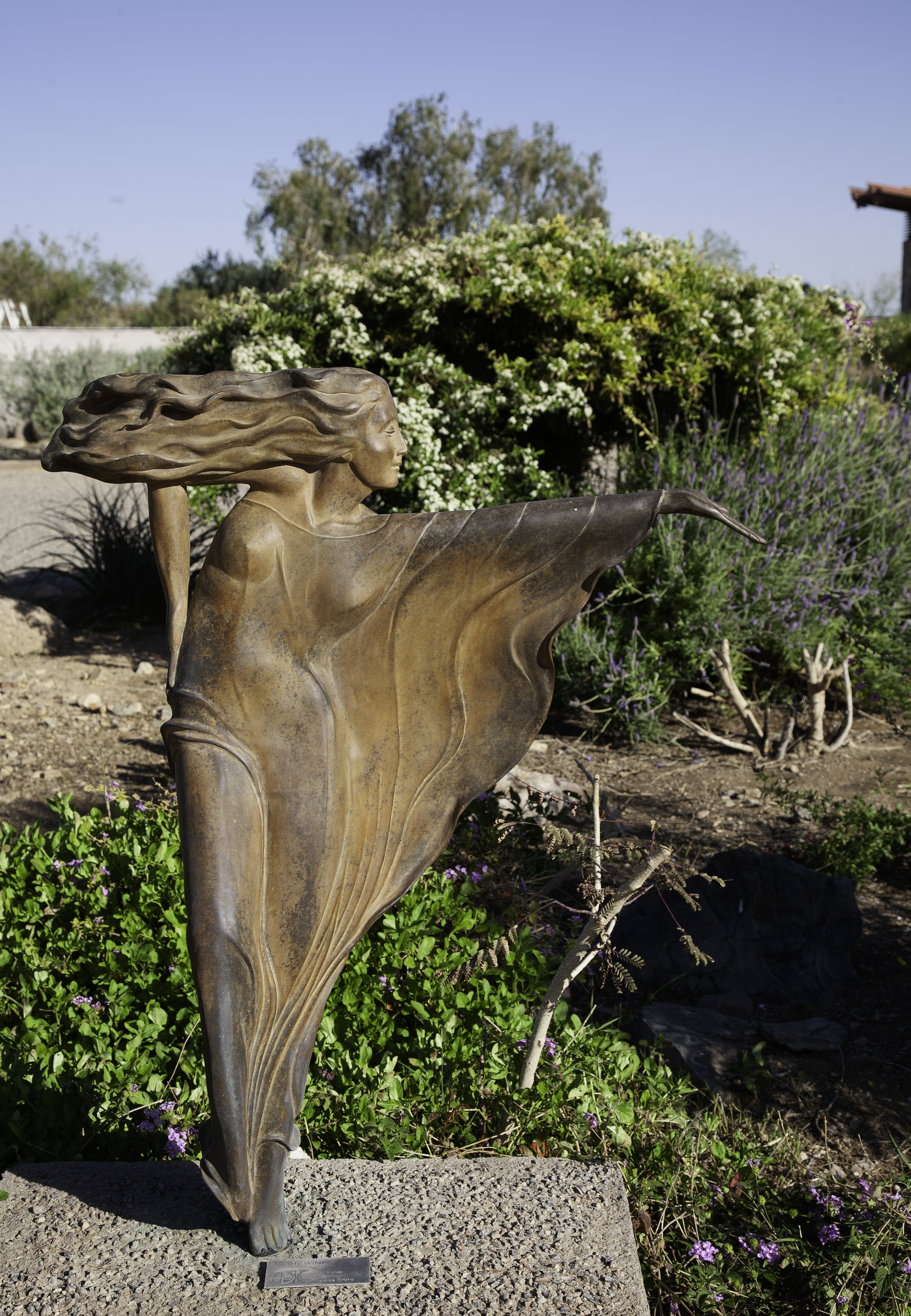
Night Wind

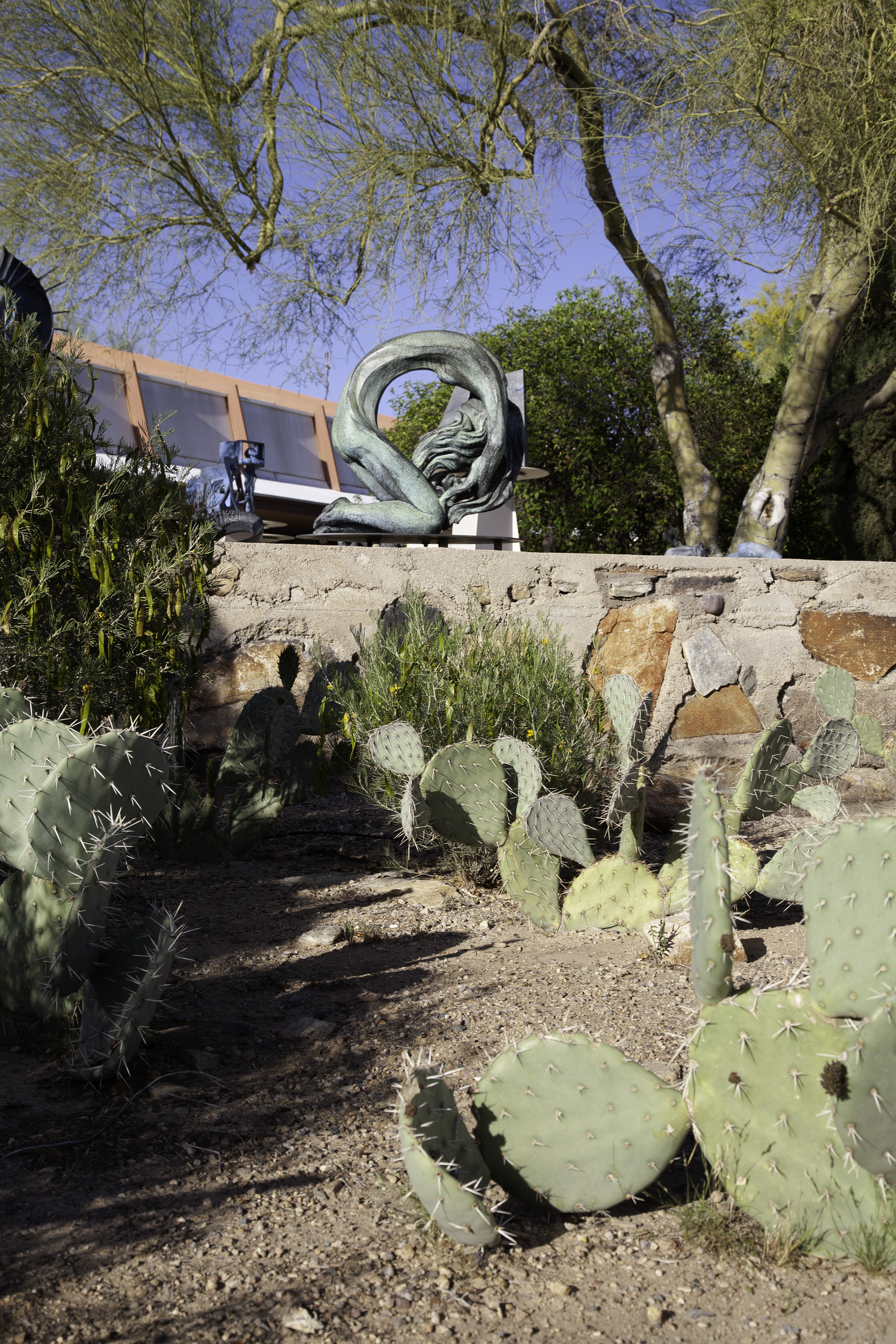
Anima

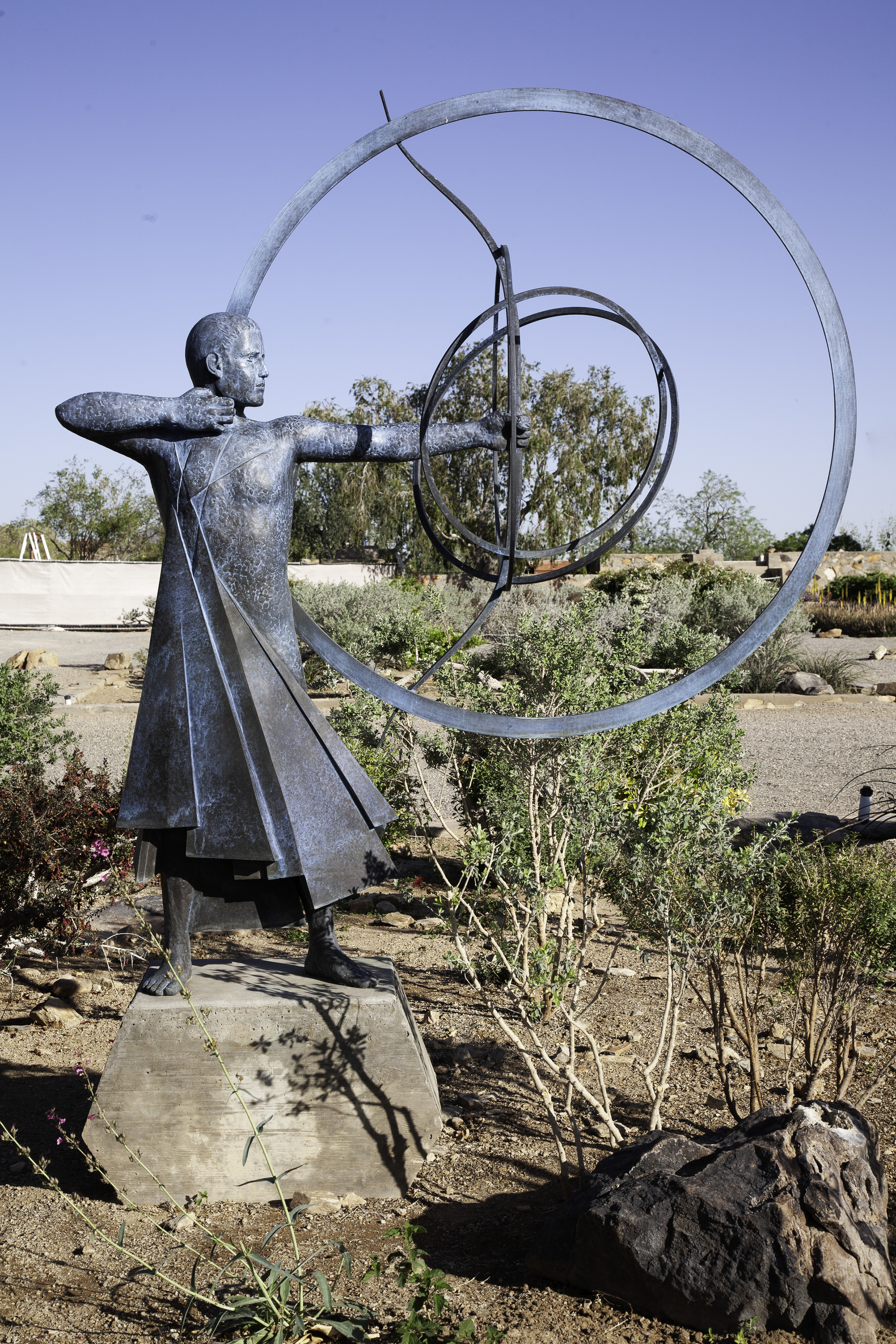
Aiming for the Mark

== Management ==
The complex is managed by the Frank Lloyd Wright Foundation, which was established in 1940 to preserve Wright's legacy. The foundation has been designated as a 501(c)(3) nonprofit organization since 1983. Taliesin Associated Architects was part of the Frank Lloyd Wright Foundation until 1985, while the Frank Lloyd Wright School of Architecture was spun off from the foundation in 2017. The foundation holds a trademark on the Taliesin West name.

The foundation provides tours of Taliesin West, which vary in duration and scope. There are "insights tours" that traverse the key rooms, in addition to more elaborate tours that provide more details about the buildings. In contrast to typical attractions, visitors are allowed to touch the objects inside. There have also been tours of the apprentices' desert shelters, hosted by architectural students. The foundation provides a virtual tour as well. In addition, Taliesin West has been used for public events such as day camps, movie nights, and happy hours, and events such as workshops and lectures are hosted there. An artist-in-residence program was established at the complex in 2025; artists are selected to design site-specific work for the program.

Taliesin West formerly hosted the Frank Lloyd Wright Foundation's archives, which were inaccessible to the general public and were very difficult for researchers to access. In 1985, the Wright Foundation and the J. Paul Getty Trust began duplicating about 21,000 documents to make them available to scholars in Los Angeles. The archive was primarily kept in a closet, and the Wright Foundation hired an archive expert in 2010 to determine how to open the rest of the collection to the public. The archives were moved to the Museum of Modern Art and Columbia University in New York City in 2012. At the time, the archive included 23,000 drawings, 44,000 photographs, and 300,000 pieces of mail and other correspondence. Columbia's Avery Architectural and Fine Arts Library took over management of the photos and drawings, while the Museum of Modern Art began managing the 3D architectural models; the Wright Foundation retains the archive's intellectual property rights.

The Wright School of Architecture also operated at the complex until 2020, when the school moved to the nearby Cosanti studio. From October to May of each year, students at the School of Architecture stayed at Taliesin West, while for the rest of the year, they worked out of the original Taliesin in Wisconsin. The school also operated other programs at Taliesin West, such as day camps for children. Since 2022, the foundation has operated the Taliesin Institute, which hosts classes at Taliesin West and the original Taliesin.

== Impact ==
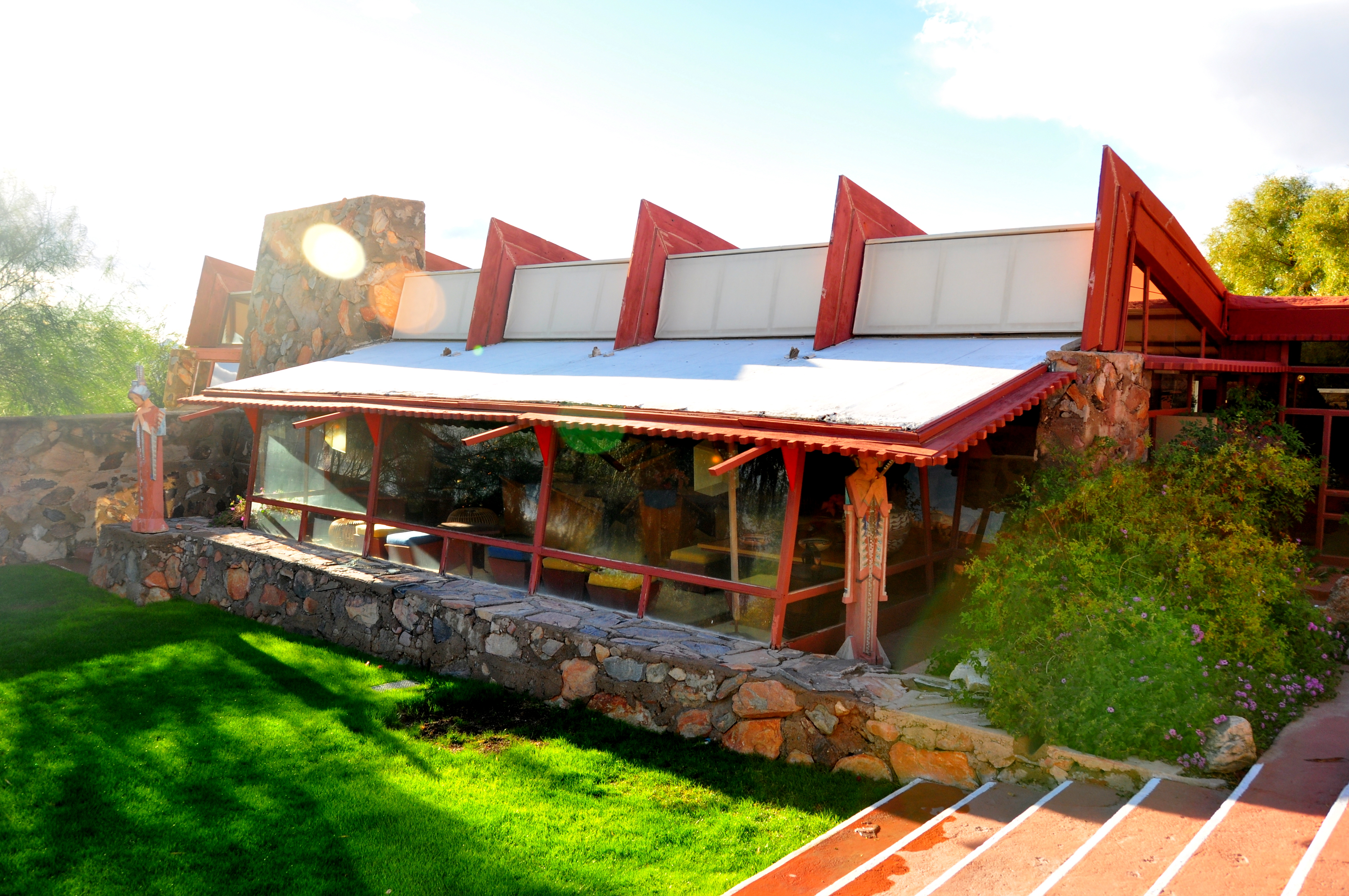
Garden room exterior

=== Critical reception ===
When the first structure was being constructed, the Chicago Tribune described the building as a mixture of Mayan, Egyptian, and Japanese architectural influences. The Arizona Republic wrote that the complex "cannot be compared accurately to any other building in the United States", while other newspapers noted that it blended in with the landscape. In Fortune magazine's August 1946 issue, George Nelson wrote that the compound was "barbaric and like a crustacean" because of its organic construction. A Chicago Tribune writer said in 1949 that the materials, including glass walls and canvas roofs, "bring the outdoors in...with startling and exciting results".

In 1964, a writer for The Capital Times wrote that all structures at Taliesin West were "a unit in the entire design—a great tent", and that the structures' designs were "in completeness with nature". Another writer for The Kansas City Star said that the complex "operates as if [Wright] still were guiding it", while The Minneapolis Star said the combination of materials "make an eye-appealing setting". A Boston Globe writer stated that the building "is impossible to photograph satisfactorily" because its sharp-edged appearance meant that there were no front or side facades. A writer for The Arizona Republic, in 1981, characterized the structures as "innovative variations on parallelograms and trapezoids", and the Associated Press wrote of the Wrights' living area: "There is an opulence in the long expanse of dining-living room combination." A writer for The Oregonian said that the structures "offer a fascinating contrast between modern forms [...] and crude construction techniques", while an Arizona Daily Star writer said the buildings had "both strength and subtlety".

In 1993, a writer for the Pittsburgh Post-Gazette said that the buildings showed respect to Wright's style without necessarily serving as a memorial to him. By contrast, Paul Goldberger of The New York Times wrote that Taliesin West "has always had an oddly worshipful, almost cultlike quality to it", citing the fact that apprentices spoke of Wright in a reverent manner and that a massive picture of Wright was hung in the drafting room. A writer for the San Francisco Examiner said in 1998 that Taliesin West was "one of the purest expressions of Frank Lloyd Wright's vision", as it had been built on an undeveloped site, and Wright had not been beholden to any client demands while designing the structures. A Los Angeles Times reporter called the complex "one part desert camp, one part cave and one part fleet of ships". A writer for The Burlington Free Press wrote in 2000 that the structures looked like an Asian temple at night.

In 2001, an Associated Press writer described the complex as imitating the desert environment, while the Los Angeles Daily News wrote that Taliesin West was a monument to Wright and to organic architecture. As a Calgary Herald reporter described it, the desert "simply flows into the walls, in the rocks and the sand" of the house. The writer Neil Levine described Taliesin West as being "angular [and] rough" with crude-looking materials, in contrast to the smooth concrete design of Fallingwater, which Wright had designed around the same time. The architect Philip Johnson described Taliesin West as "the essence of architecture" but also said that, to people unfamiliar with Wright's work, the structures appeared as "a meaningless group of buildings". Sunset magazine wrote that scholars called Taliesin West "one of Wright's masterpieces". Several critics wrote that the buildings' organic, transient nature had become diluted due to modifications such as air conditioning, glass ceilings, and steel beams. Taliesin West ranked 123rd on the AIA's 2007 List of America's Favorite Architecture, which listed the top 150 buildings in the United States.

=== Media and exhibits ===
Taliesin West was depicted in a 1955 film about modernist U.S. buildings, and the complex was featured in a 1957 special for the TV show Wide, Wide World and a 1972 television special titled "Taliesin West". The complex has been the subject of several books, including Kathryn Smith's 1997 book Frank Lloyd Wright's Taliesin and Taliesin West. In addition, the complex was depicted in a 1997 children's book and on packs of baseball cards depicting historic sites. A model of the complex was displayed at New York's Museum of Modern Art in 1940, and pictures of the structures were shown at the same museum in 1947.

=== Landmark designations ===
Taliesin West received the American Institute of Architects' Twenty-five Year Award in 1973 and was added to the National Register of Historic Places in 1974. The complex was further designated as a National Historic Landmark (NHL) in 1982; the National Park Service cited the complex as "one of the first major works during the last quarter-century of [Wright's] life". Taliesin West was the 25th National Historic Landmark in Arizona and the first in the state to be designated specifically because of its architecture. A plaque denoting the NHL status was installed in 1986. The Scottsdale Historic Preservation Commission voted in January 2006 to rezone 10.6 acres (4.3 ha) of Taliesin West as a historic preservation site. The city government approved a municipal-landmark designation for the tract that April, and the designation went into effect in 2008 after the city approved the complex's preservation plan.

In the 1980s, Taliesin and Taliesin West were jointly nominated as a World Heritage Site, a UNESCO designation for properties with special worldwide significance. The federal government endorsed the nomination, but UNESCO rejected it because the organization wanted to see a larger nomination with more Wright properties. In 2008, the National Park Service submitted ten Frank Lloyd Wright properties, including Taliesin West, to a tentative World Heritage list. Ultimately, Taliesin West and seven other properties were added to the World Heritage List under the title "The 20th-Century Architecture of Frank Lloyd Wright" in July 2019.

== See also ==
- List of Frank Lloyd Wright works
- List of National Historic Landmarks in Arizona
- List of World Heritage Sites in the United States
- National Register of Historic Places listings in Maricopa County, Arizona
