= Mount McDowell =

Landform in Maricopa County, Arizona

- Red Mountain, FireRock
- Red Mountain from Fountain Hills, Arizona

Highest point
- Elevation: 2,832 ft (863 m) NAVD 88
- Prominence: 1,260 ft (384 m)
- Coordinates: 33°32′26″N 111°41′36″W

Geography
- Location within Arizona
- Location: Salt River Pima-Maricopa Indian Reservation; Maricopa County, Arizona, U.S.
- Parent range: McDowell Mountains, Arizona
- Topo map: USGS Granite Reef Dam

Geology
- Rock age: Tertiary

Mount McDowell (O'odham: S-wegĭ Doʼag, Yavapai: Wi:kawatha), more commonly referred to as Red Mountain, is located on the Salt River Pima-Maricopa Indian Reservation, just north of Mesa, Arizona. It is named after General Irvin McDowell, a Union officer in the Civil War. Its elevation is 2,832 feet (863 m). It is not the same landmark as the McDowell Peak, which is 11 miles (18 km) away to the northwest.

Mount McDowell is often called "Red Mountain" or "FireRock", due to its composition of sandstone conglomerate which gives it a distinctive red color that glows during sunset. The deep cleft on its western side (visible in the image at right) is known as "Gunsight" because of its resemblance to the narrow slot in a fort used for firing at attackers.

The mountain is located on the Salt River Pima-Maricopa Indian Reservation, and has been declared off-limits to hikers, climbers and photographers since the early 1980s, due to vandalism.
