= Cézanne (typeface) =

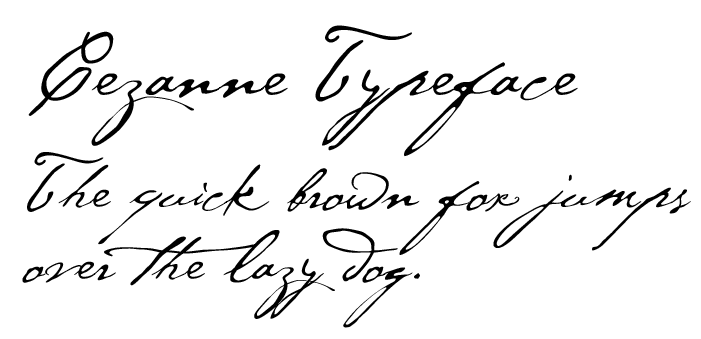
- Category: Script
- Designers: Michael Want; Richard Kegler
- Commissioned by: Philadelphia Museum of Art
- Date created: 1996
- Re-issuing foundries: P22 type foundry

Cézanne is a script typeface based on Paul Cézanne's handwriting. The typeface includes alternate characters and swashes. It was created for the Philadelphia Museum of Art by designers Michael Want and Richard Kegler and published by P22 type foundry in 1996.

This typeface is considered as such because it can be used in design in a way just a sample of handwriting cannot. Typography can be described as being purposely designed and altered, sometimes from lettering or writing. In the creation of this typeface, the writing of Cézanne is taken, first considered as lettering, then altered slightly to be used in design. The expressive swoops and curls are indicative of speed and beauty to cultivate a feeling that embodies the meaning of whichever work the typeface would be used in. Taking the expressiveness of this typeface into commercial design can help designers highlight certain aspects of a product or service.

== In use ==
This typeface is used in media such as an alternate movie poster for Abraham Lincoln: Vampire Hunter because it draws a contrast between the perceived human nature of a vampire hunter versus his prey, the undead vampires. The Cézanne typeface, as with other script fonts, contains a handmade quality indicative of the human touch, which is often used to draw consumers towards a particular product. In this case, the nature of the movie is revealed through its poster typography and with each typeface used.

== See also ==
- List of typefaces
