= Giampa =

Giampa or Giampà is a surname. Notable people with the surname include:

- Domenico Giampà (born 1977), Italian footballer and coach
- Gerald Giampa (1950–2009), Canadian printer, typographer, and author
