= East End (Arizona) =

Landform near Scottsdale, Arizona

- Location within Arizona Location within the United States

Highest point
- Elevation: 4,069 ft (1,240 m) NAVD 88
- Prominence: 1,347 ft (411 m)
- Coordinates: 33°40′47″N 111°48′02″W

Geography
- Location: Maricopa County, Arizona, U.S.
- Parent range: McDowell Mountains
- Topo map: USGS McDowell Peak

East End is a mountain located at the northeastern end of the McDowell Mountains and about 24 miles (39 km) north northeast of Scottsdale, Arizona. Its summit is the highest point in the range, at 4,069 feet (1,240 m). The mountain is mostly covered in rocky boulders, and is the site of the ancient Marcus Landslide.
