= P22 (type foundry) =

Digital type foundry and letterpress printing studio, Rochester, NY, USA (created 1994)

P22 Type Foundry
- Industry: Graphic design
- Genre: Typeface design
- Founded: 1994
- Founder: Richard Kegler, Carima El-Behairy
- Headquarters: Rochester, New York, United States
- Number of locations: 1
- Products: Fonts, Books, Letterpress Printing Supplies
- Website: http://www.p22.com

P22 Type Foundry is a digital type foundry and letterpress printing studio based in Rochester, New York. The company was created in 1994 in Buffalo, New York by co-founders Richard Kegler and Carima El-Behairy. The company is best known for its type designs, which have appeared in films (e.g. Harry Potter, Suburbicon) and on commercial products (e.g. Trader Joe's, Founders Brewing Co.). The P22 Type Foundry retail font collection specializes in historical letterforms inspired by art, history, and science that otherwise have never been available previously in digital form. P22 works with museums and foundations to ensure the development of accurate historical typefaces, and with private clients to create custom bespoke fonts.

== History ==
The name P22 has no specific significance and was used by founder Richard Kegler prior to the type foundry as a label for various art projects including an ambitious mail art correspondence. Once P22 started developing fonts, they began to sell them packaged on floppy disks. These were very popular in museum stores because of their art history focus. P22 began to work with museums and artist foundations (Frank Lloyd Wright Foundation, Guggenheim Museum, Burchfield-Penney Art Center, Philadelphia Museum of Art, Albright-Knox Art Gallery, et al.) to develop these art history based font sets. The floppy disks soon gave way in the late 1990s to CD-ROMs packaged in boxes with key charts. During this decade P22 moved locations three times within Buffalo to accommodate growth and manufacturing concerns. Later, with the adaptation of the internet as a means to deliver fonts, P22 reduced its staff and moved to its last Buffalo location. P22 went virtual for a few years when founder Richard Kegler became the Director of the Book Arts at Wells College in Aurora, NY. When Kegler ended his tenure at Wells in 2019, P22 once again coalesced into a studio location in Rochester, NY.

== P22 Type Collections ==
P22 as independent type foundry consists of a few partners and outside contractors, who create the core P22 collection fonts. However P22 licenses new exclusive type designs from independent designers and makes them available via the International House of Fonts (IHOF) collection, since 2001.

In 2003, P22 acquired the collection of Ted Staunton (briefly known as the Sherwood Type Collection), which consists of expertly designed alphabets that have historical basis, but tend toward the fanciful and mythic. Staunton continues to design and publish new fonts to this collection.

In 2004, P22 acquired the Lanston Type Co. from Gerald Giampa, and continues to update and publish fonts from this renowned collection of type. Known as the Lanston Type Collection (LTC), it contains classic type designs from the likes of Fredric Goudy, Sol Hess, Bruce Rogers, among many others.

In 2005, Richard Kegler initiated the Rimmer Type Foundry with Jim Rimmer, to make his proprietary type designs available to a larger audience. Because Jim Rimmer is a Canadian national artistic treasure, the digital holdings of this division were repatriated to Patrick Griffin of Canada Type in 2012.

In 2012, P22 partnered with the Hamilton Wood Type & Printing Museum to publish a collection of wood type revivals. A portion of every sale of the Hamilton Wood Type Collection (HWT) fonts goes to help fund the museum's mission.

== Notable P22 Typefaces ==
- P22 Underground Pro, originally published 1997 when the London Transport Museum licensed the original Edward Johnston font made for the London Underground to the P22 Type Foundry.
- P22 Cezanne Pro originally designed by Michael Want 1996, and expanded in 2005. This script font is nearly ubiquitous and used on all kinds of commercial graphic design and packaging.
- P22 Operina Pro designed by James Grieshaber, was licensed by Apple Computer and made available within the MacOS as Trattatello.
- P22 Marcel is more than just a script typeface, it is the product of a journey undertaken by designer Carolyn Porter to learn the fate of Marcel Heuzé, a Frenchman conscripted into labor during World War II, whose handwritten letters provided source material for the font.

== P22 Publications ==
P22 self publishes from time to time. They published the Indie Fonts books (a collection of 3 volumes) in the early 2000s, to illuminate the work of small independent type designers. P22 produced a documentary film in 2011 called Making Faces, to document the process of book artist Jim Rimmer as he developed a traditional metal font, from concept drawing through to casting in lead. P22 has also published Savage Impressions, a comprehensive book on the work of artist and letterpress-printer Bruce Licher and his Independent Project Records & Press.

== P22 / Atom Smash Records ==
P22/Atom Smash Records is P22's music publishing branch. Originally started to promote and publish local Buffalo, NY bands, they have gone on to produce nineteen releases, including reissues of Rod McKuen records, a techno band called The William Caslon Experience, and the latest release is a vinyl LP of Bruce Licher's demos called Tape Excavation to accompany the Savage Impressions book.
