= Gerald Giampa =

American typographer (1950–2009)

Gerald Giampa (March 4, 1950 – June 24, 2009) was a printer, typographer and author.

== Biography ==
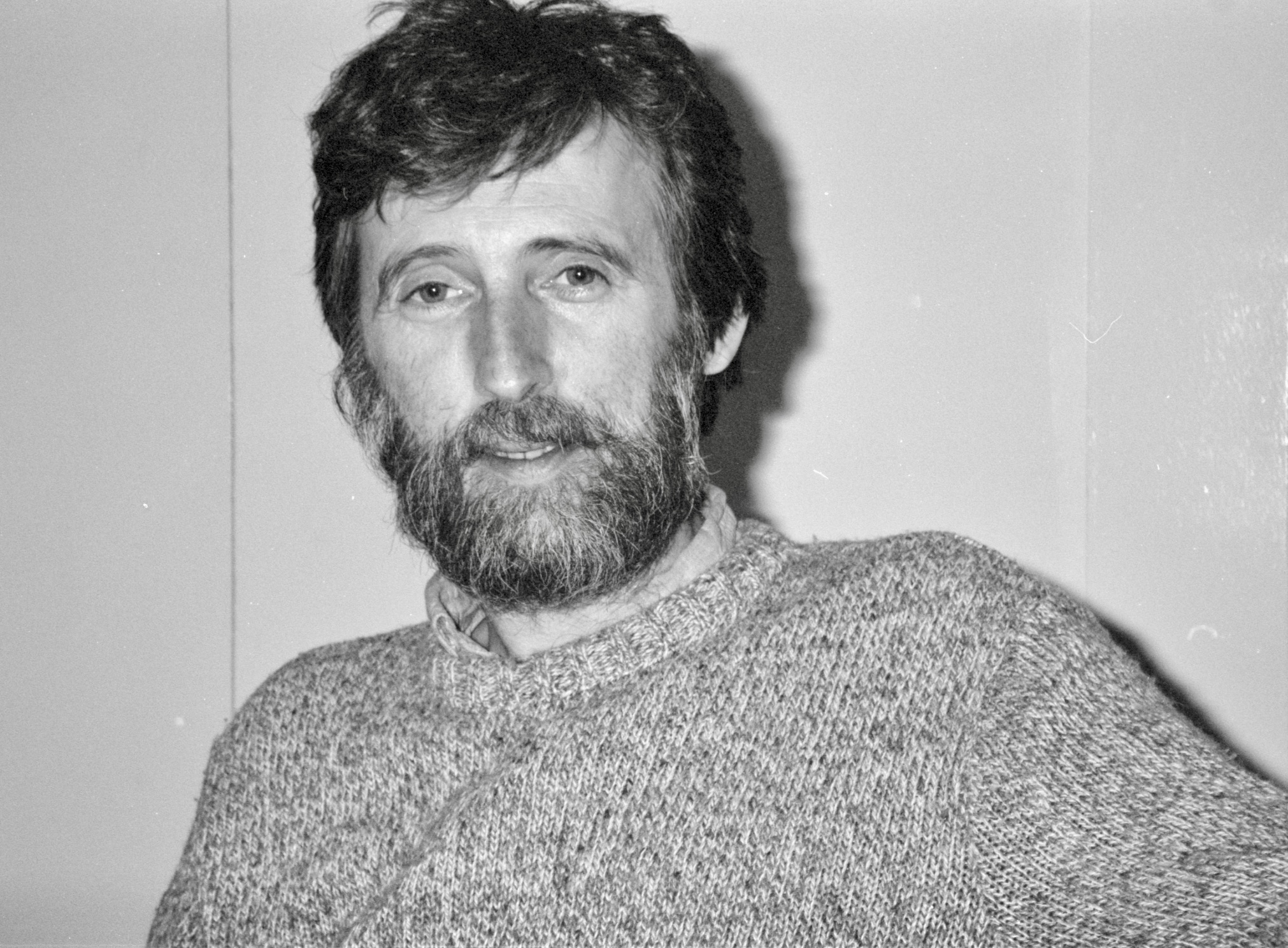
Gerald Giampa photo by Brian Nation

When Gerald Giampa was born on 4 March 1950, his parents lived in a tent in Duncan, British Columbia. His interest in printing books came from his grandfather, who liked to read. Giampa studied letterpress printing and typography under Wil Hudson and Nick Schwabe in Vancouver.

From 1975 to 1981 Giampa's Cobblestone Press in Vancouver published not only jobbing printing but also works by Ezra Pound, Robin Blaser and George Bowering among others. During this time he chiefly used Caslon type.

Later Giampa expanded his company, renaming it the Northland Letterpress Company, and in 1983 he bought the US Lanston Monotype Machine Company of Philadelphia from M & H typefounders in San Francisco. With the Lanston Monotype Company's stock he acquired much of Frederic Goudy's materials. He and Jim Rimmer adapted these for digital form; and from 1988 to 2004 ran the digital foundry, Lanston Type Company.

In 1994 Giampa moved to Prince Edward Island, but a few years later his stock was destroyed in a storm. The name of his firm, together with its fonts, were bought in 2004 by the digital foundry P22, of Buffalo, NY.

Giampa designed the Bodoni 26 font, which was named in the top 100 Types in a survey conducted by the Type Directors Club.

He died on 20 June 2009 in Vancouver.
