= Jim Rimmer =

Canadian graphic designer and letterpress printer (1934-2010)

Jim Rimmer (April 1, 1934 – January 9, 2010) was a Canadian graphic designer, letterpress printer, proprietor of the Pie Tree Press and is especially notable as a designer of typefaces.

== Biography ==
Jim Rimmer was born on 1 April 1934 and was raised in Vancouver, British Columbia, Canada. He attended Vancouver Technical School, "which gave an introduction to metal type and presses through the school's large printing trade shop."

After an apprenticeship he began a long period of working with type and design for newspaper publication and printing, all in British Columbia. Rimmer attended evening classes to study graphic design at Vancouver School of Art. "During his freelance years he worked on projects for the major agencies and design studios in Vancouver, for corporations, airlines, mining and forestry companies. A large part of his work entailed letter design and lettering projects." Along with his long career as a designer, Rimmer taught at several colleges including Capilano College, ECIAD, Langara College, Kwantlen College, Richmond and UCFV, Abbotsford. For a brief time in the 1970s, Rimmer was type director of the Lanston Monotype Corporation in Vancouver.

Rimmer was noted as the proprietor of the Pie Tree Press, located in New Westminster, a printing office for which he designed many typefaces in metal, including Albertan, Kaatskill and Stern.

The P22 Type Foundry marketed Rimmer's typefaces as the Rimmer Type Foundry until July 1, 2012, when it was announced that the rights to Rimmer's work were acquired by Canada Type. Over 200 digital faces, distributed among 18 families, have been made from Rimmer's designs.

In 2007, Rimmer received the honor of becoming a fellow of the Society of Graphic Designers of Canada. In 2010, Rimmer was awarded the Robert R. Reid Award for lifetime achievement or extraordinary contributions to the book arts in Canada from the Alcuin Society.

Rimmer died of cancer on January 8, 2010.

== Books ==
- Rimmer, Jim, Leaves from the Pie Tree Press, Pie Tree Press, 2006.
