= Cézanne (crater) =

Crater on Mercury

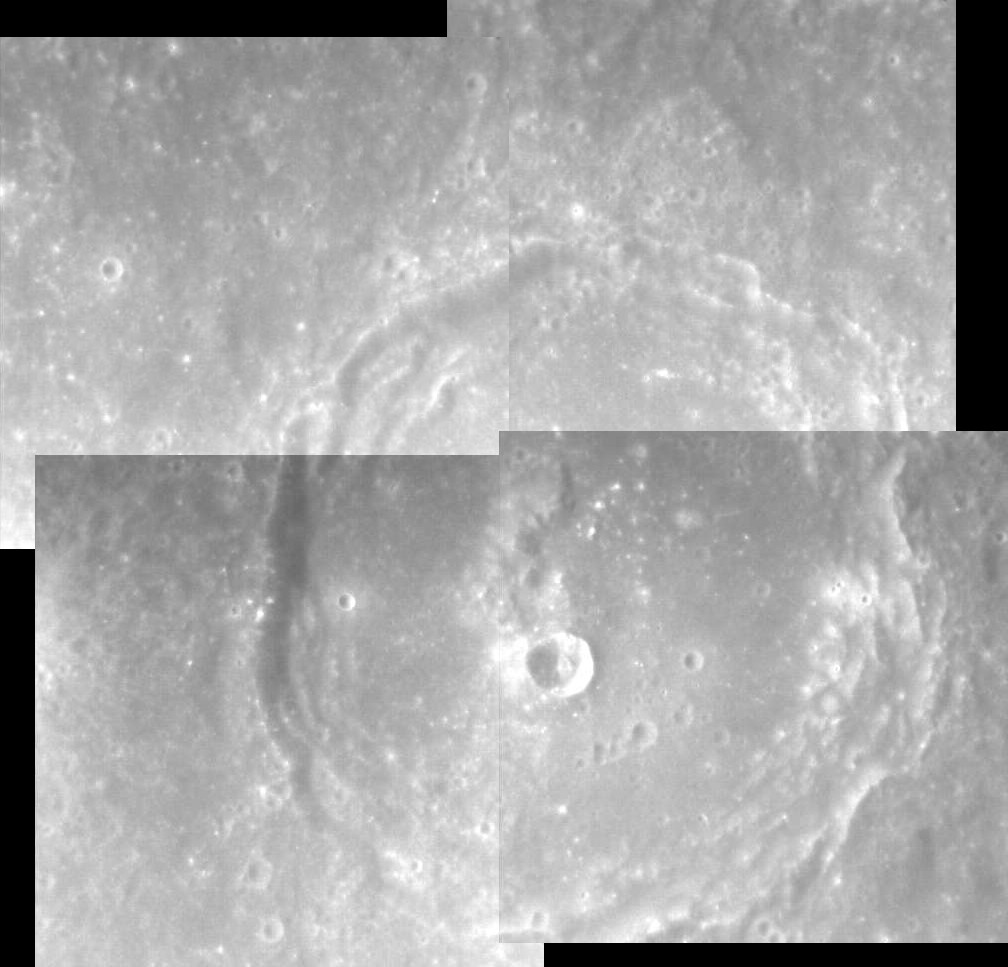
- MESSENGER NAC mosaic centered on Cézanne
- Feature type: Impact crater
- Location: Beethoven quadrangle, Mercury
- Coordinates: 8.47°S 123.69°W
- Diameter: 67 km
- Eponym: Paul Cézanne

Cézanne is a crater on Mercury. It has a diameter of 67 kilometers. Its name was adopted by the International Astronomical Union (IAU) in 1985. Cézanne is named for the French artist Paul Cézanne, who lived from 1839 to 1906.
