= McDowell Peak =

Landform in Maricopa County, Arizona

- Location within Arizona Location within the United States

Highest point
- Elevation: 4,036 ft (1,230 m) NAVD 88
- Prominence: 1,004 ft (306 m)
- Coordinates: 33°39′36″N 111°49′06″W

Geography
- Location: Maricopa County, Arizona, U.S.
- Topo map: USGS McDowell Peak

McDowell Peak is located in the McDowell Mountains, to the northeast of Phoenix, Arizona. Its height is 4,036 feet (1,230 m). McDowell Peak is located approximately half a mile north of the easily recognizable Thompson Peak, and shares a ridge with Drinkwater Peak. It is bordered on the south by Bell Pass, and on the north by Windgate Pass.

The peak is in Scottsdale's McDowell Sonoran Preserve, owned and operated by the city of Scottsdale. By local ordinances "all preserve users must remain on designated and posted trails..." As of August 2016, there were no trails to the summit of McDowell Peak meaning that access was restricted.
