= Richard Kegler =

Richard Kegler is an American typographer and founding partner of P22 type foundry, which originated in 1994 as an outgrowth of his Master's thesis project on Marcel Duchamp.

Kegler's background in typography and book arts includes ventures in bookbinding and letterpress printing. However, the historical context and background of type continues to be his greatest interest and shapes the evolution of P22.

Kegler is also the founder of the Western New York Book Arts Collaborative.

Richard Kegler has designed the typefaces Daddy-O, Dwiggins, Dyrynk, Platten and Preissig Lino.
