= McDowell Mountains =

Mountain range in Arizona, United States

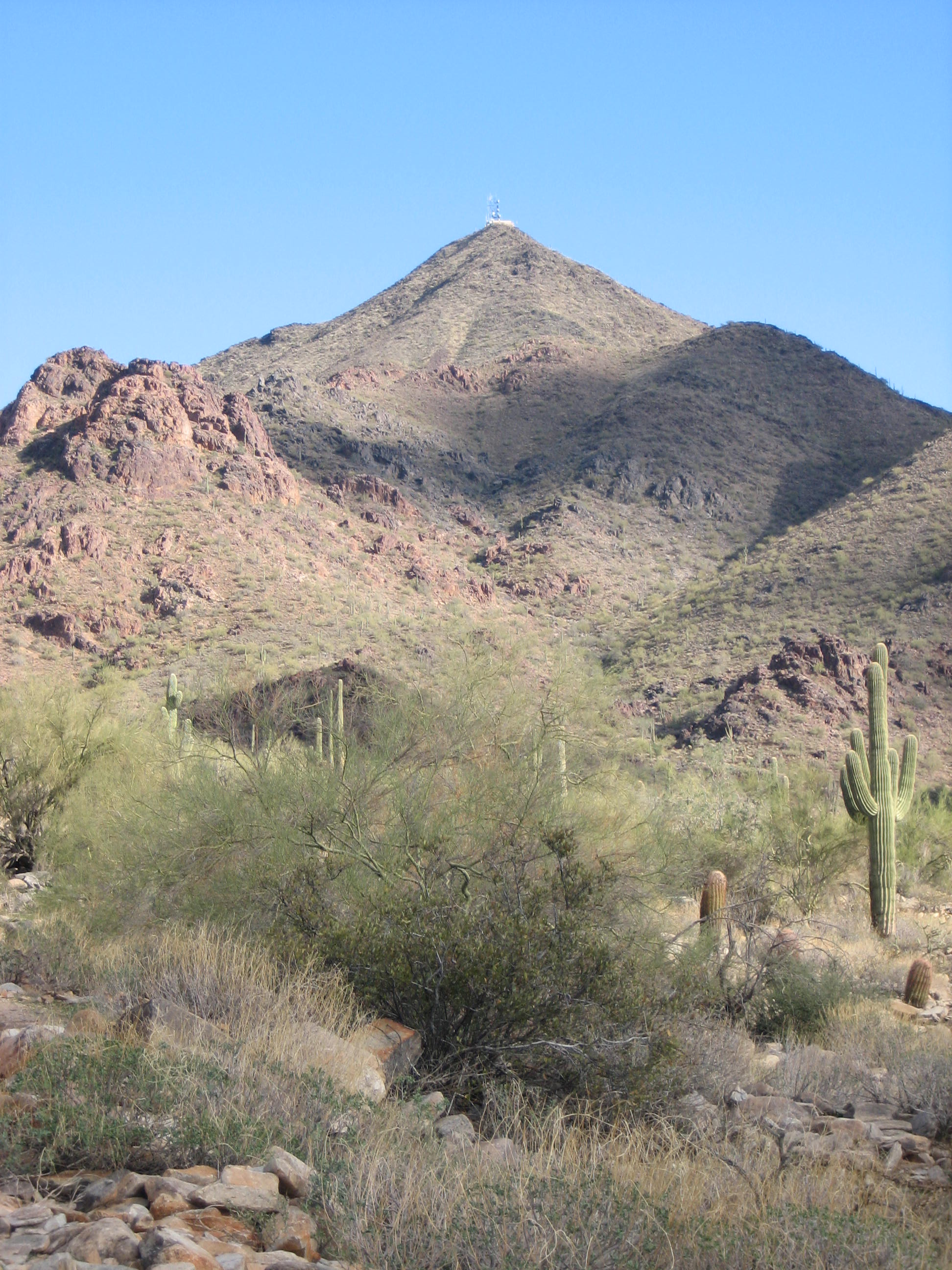
- Thompson Peak and foothills – a wash with Palo Verde trees and Saguaros

Highest point
- Peak: East End
- Elevation: 4,057 ft (1,237 m)
- Coordinates: 33°40′47″N 111°48′01″W

Dimensions
- Length: 25 mi (40 km) (NNW x SSE)-curves to southeast

Geography
- Location within Arizona
- Country: United States
- State: Arizona
- Regions: South: Arizona transition; Northeast: Sonoran Desert
- County: Maricopa
- Range coordinates: 33°39′N 111°49′W
- Borders on: New River Mountains—NNW; Mazatzal Mountains—NNE & E; Verde River—E; Salt River (Arizona)—SE & S; Phoenix metro region—W, SW & S

The McDowell Mountain Range (Yavapai: Wi:kajasa) is located about twenty miles northeast of downtown Phoenix, Arizona, and may be seen from most places throughout the city. The range is composed of Miocene deposits left nearly five million years ago. The McDowells share borders with the cities of Fountain Hills, Scottsdale, and Maricopa County. The city of Scottsdale has made its share of the McDowells a preserve, and has set up a wide trail network in partnership with the McDowell Sonoran Conservancy. The McDowell Sonoran Conservancy was established in 1991. The highest peak in the McDowells is East End, at 4,069 feet (1,240 m). This mountain range also serves as a sacred marker to the Yavapai people. The boundaries of the range are generally defined by Saddleback Mountain in the South and Granite Mountain as the Northern boundary. Landmarks include Pinnacle Peak and Tom's Thumb. Although technically a stand-alone, Mt. McDowell (referred to as Red Mountain by Phoenix residents), not to be confused with McDowell Peak, is sometimes listed on maps as a part of the McDowell Mountains.

== Summits ==
- East End (Arizona)
- Thompson Peak (Arizona)
- McDowell Peak
- Sunrise Peak
- Rock Knob
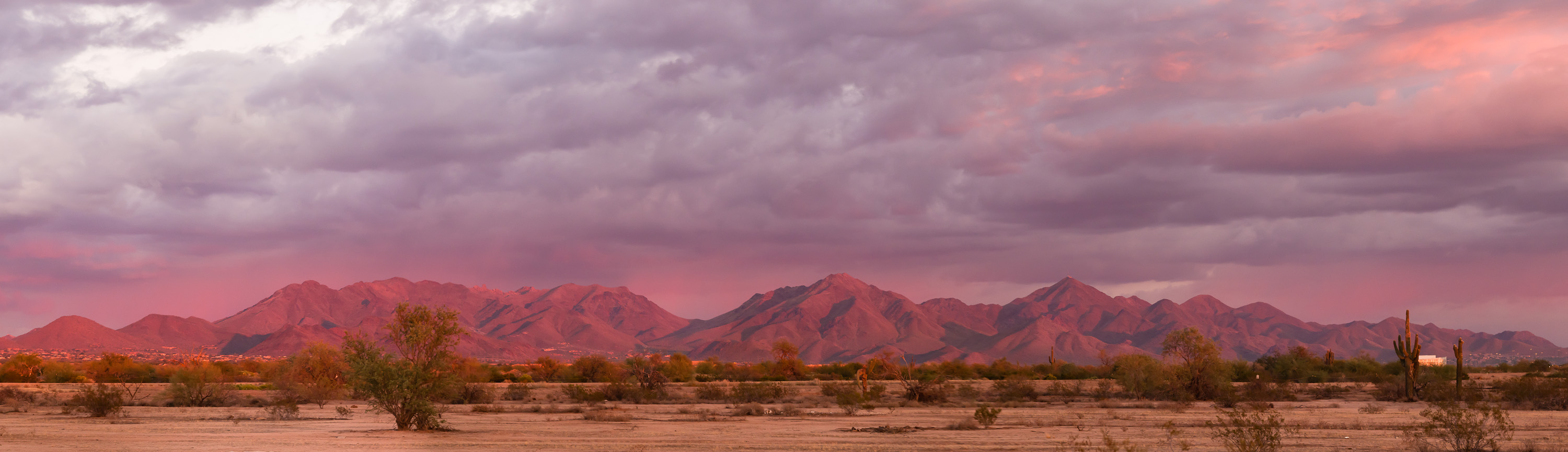
The McDowell Mountain Range at sunset

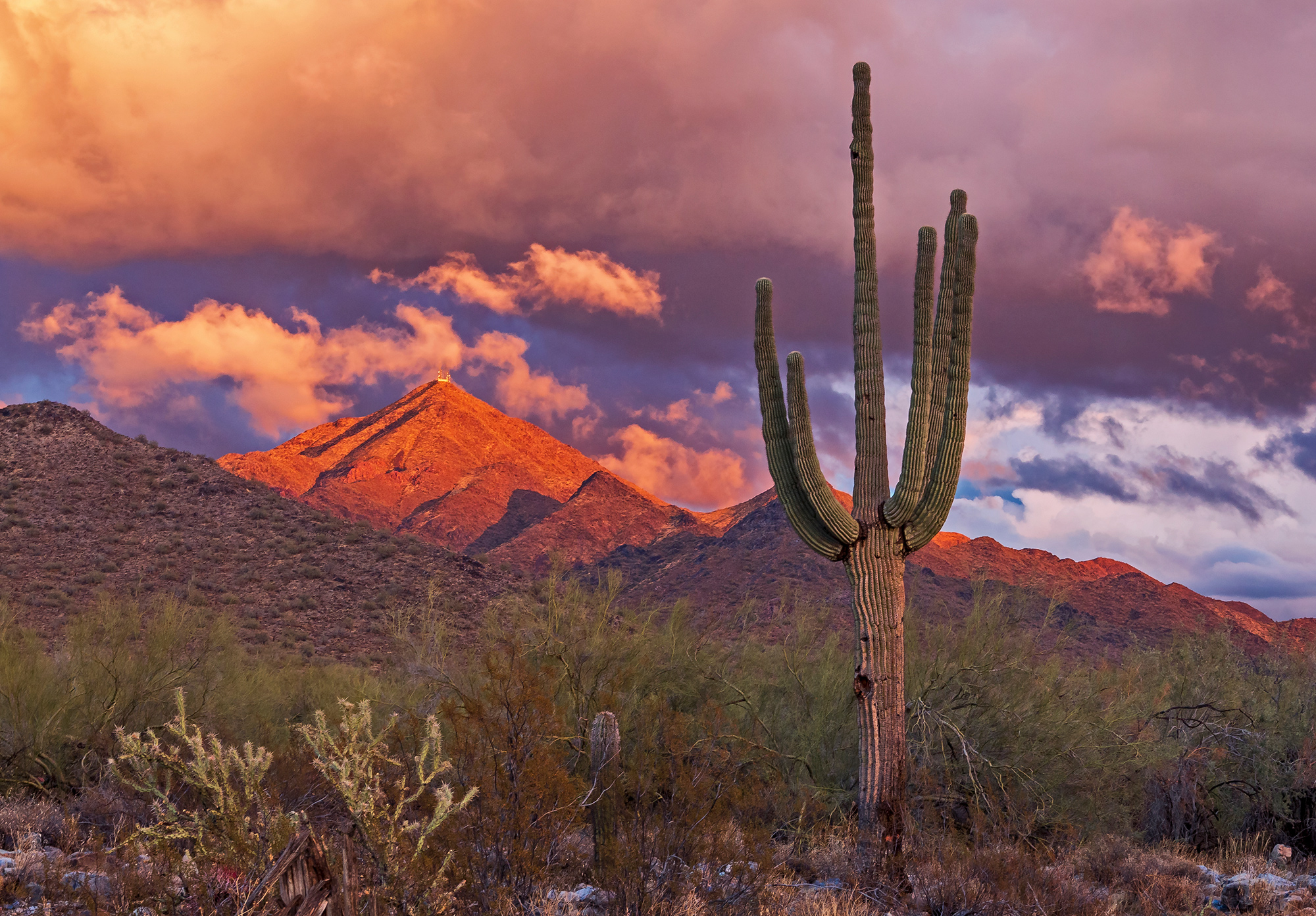
McDowell Mountains at dusk
