= Thompson Peak (Arizona) =

Mountain in Maricopa County, Arizona

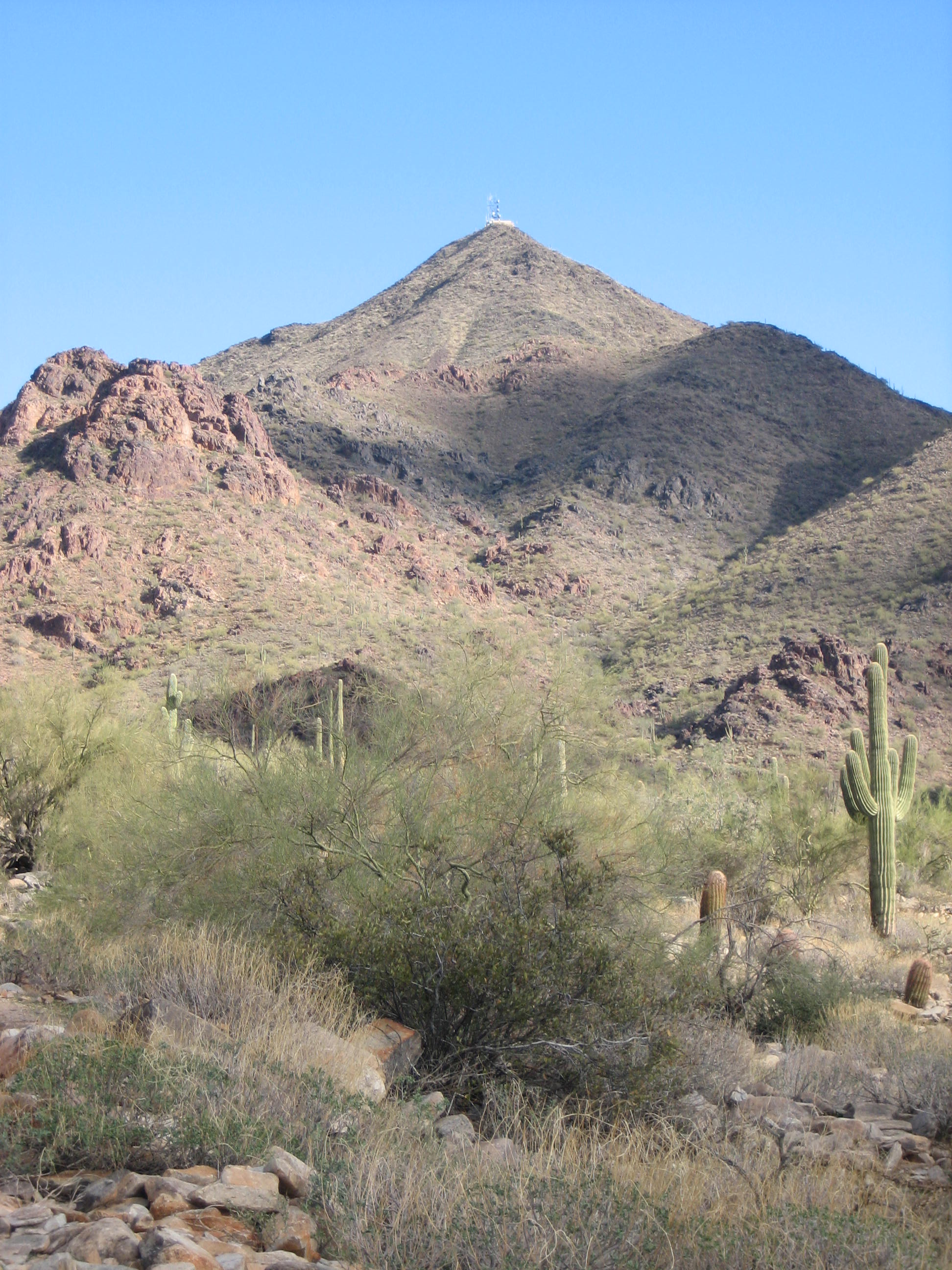
- Thompson Peak, McDowell Mountains

Highest point
- Elevation: 3,984 ft (1,214 m) NAVD 88
- Prominence: 762 ft (232 m)
- Coordinates: 33°38′39″N 111°48′44″W

Geography
- Location within Arizona
- Location: Maricopa County, Arizona, U.S.
- Parent range: McDowell Mountains
- Topo map: USGS McDowell Peak

Thompson Peak is a 3,984 ft (1,214 m) summit in the McDowell Mountains 20 miles (32 km) northeast of Phoenix, Arizona. Its peak has amateur and Maricopa County government radio towers, accessible via a service road from Fountain Hills.
