= Yavapai (disambiguation) =

The Yavapai are a Native American people of central and western Arizona.

Yavapai may also refer to:

- Yavapai-Apache Nation, a federally recognized tribe living near Camp Verde, Arizona
- Yavapai-Prescott Tribe, a federally recognized tribe at Prescott, Arizona
- Fort McDowell Yavapai Nation, a federally recognized tribe living near Scottsdale and Phoenix, Arizona
- Yavapai language, a Yuman language spoken by the Yavapai people
- Yavapai College, a community college in Prescott, Arizona
- Yavapai County, Arizona, a county in central Arizona
- Yavapai orogeny, a Precambrian mountain-building event
