= Farfán =

Farfán is a Spanish surname. Notable people with the surname include:

- Alirio Farfán, Colombian cinematographer
- Aura Elena Farfán, Guatemalan human rights activist
- Cristina Farfán (1846–1880), Mexican educator and writer
- David Farfan (1936 – before 2009), Trinidad and Tobago sailor
- Domingo Farfán (1957–2016), Peruvian footballer
- Gabriel Farfán (born 1988), American soccer player, twin brother of Michael
- Jefferson Farfán (born 1984), Peruvian footballer, nephew of Rafael
- José Martín Farfán (born 1965), Colombian cyclist
- Juan Pablo Farfán (born 1985), Peruvian footballer
- Marco Farfan (born 1998), American soccer player
- Marcos Farfán de los Godos, Spanish explorer of Mexico and Arizona
- Michael Farfan (born 1988), American soccer player, twin brother of Gabriel
- Rafael Farfán (born 1975), Peruvian footballer, uncle of Jefferson
- Rosa María Farfán, Mexican mathematics education researcher
- Rubén Farfán (born 1991), Chilean footballer
- Salvador Farfán (1932–2023), Mexican footballer

== See also ==
- Farfan, a village in Iran
