= Pakota =

Yavapai leader (19th c,)

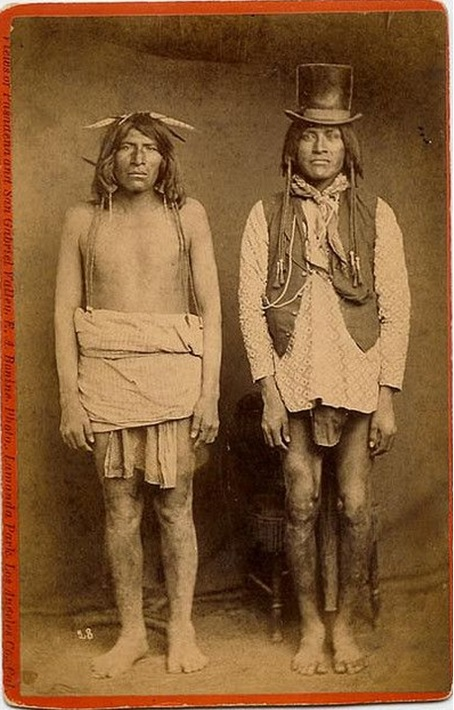
Yuma Apache men, photograph taken by E.A. Butine. 1889 Los Angeles, Ca.

Pakota (Yavapai: "Big Man" or Nya-kwa-la-hwa-la "Long Black Fellow") was a 19th-century Yavapai leader.

== Career ==
Pakota and his nephew Takodawa (Yavapai: "Hanging on a limb,") were Yavapai men. They were picked by General Oliver Otis Howard to attend a peace conference in Washington with President Ulysses S. Grant. Earlier, Grant had called for Indians across the country to attend the conference to bring peace between the tribes and the settlers.

Howard wanted Chief Ohatchecama and Chief Jemaspie to attend but Chief Ohatchecama refused because he believed he would never return, while Chief Jemaspie wanted the President to come to Camp Date Creek. In a compromise, the chiefs picked Pakota and Takodawa to go to the conference in their places.

In June, 1872, General Howard, his aide-de-camp, Captain Wilkinson; Superintendent of Indian Affairs Bendell; Pima missionary and teacher Cook; Joe Gacka, the Yavapais' interpreter; and two Indians from Camp Grant with two Indians from the Pima journeyed to the historic meeting.

At the White House, each delegate received $50, a document that proclaimed him to be a “chief”, and a medal with Grant’s image on it. Pakota (later called José Coffee) and Takodawa (later called Washington Charley) were not leaders or chiefs at the time.

Pakota scouted Los Angeles as a possible location for the tribe to farm.
