= Clinton Pattea =

American politician (1930–2013)

President of the Fort McDowell Yavapai Nation
- In office 2008 – July 5, 2013
- Preceded by: Raphael Bear
- Succeeded by: TBD

President of the Fort McDowell Yavapai Nation
- In office ?–2004
- Preceded by: ?
- Succeeded by: Raphael Bear

Personal details
- Born: November 11, 1930 Fort McDowell Yavapai Nation, Arizona
- Died: July 5, 2013 (aged 82) Fountain Hills, Arizona
- Spouse: Rosiebelle Pattea
- Children: Stephanie; Sandra; Steven
- Education: Northern Arizona University

Clinton M. Pattea (November 11, 1930 – July 5, 2013) was an American activist and politician, who served as the longtime President of the Fort McDowell Yavapai Nation, a predominantly Yavapai Indian reservation in Maricopa County, Arizona, until his death in 2013. Pattea, who also served on the Fort McDowell Yavapai Tribal Council for more than forty years, was an early proponent of the Native American gaming and casino industry on the Fort McDowell Yavapai Nation.

Pattea was an early proponent of gambling, specifically small slot-machine operations, on Native American reservations. The installation of slot machines on the Fort McDowell Yavapai Nation was opposed by the state of Arizona, under then-Governor Fife Symington, who declared the operations illegal. Pattea refused to give up the slot machines. The standoff between Pattea and Symington eventually led to compact negotiations, leading to the legalization of Native American gambling in Arizona. There are now approximately twenty-four Native American casinos throughout Arizona, as of 2013.

Pattea died from an illness on the morning of July 5, 2013, at his home in Fountain Hills, Arizona, at the age of 81. His family had held a celebration of his life in June 2013 as his health had deteriorated. His death was announced by Fort McDowell Yavapai Vice President Bernadine Burnette.
