= Ohatchecama =

19th-century Yavapai leader

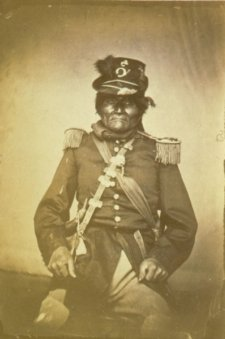
Ohatchecama

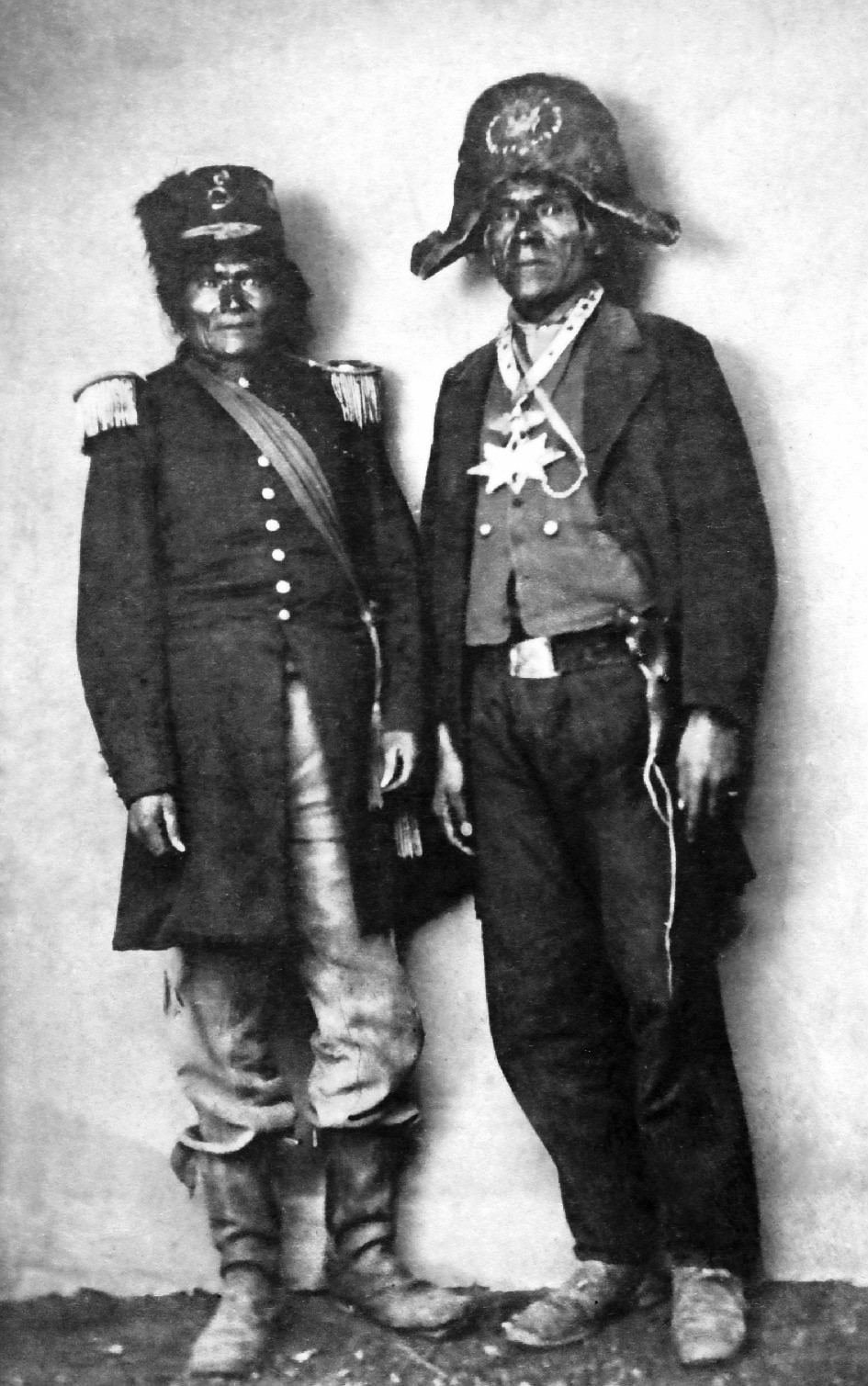
Ohatchecama and Irataba, photographed during the trial following the Wickenburg Massacre

Ohatchecama (Yavapai: "Striking Enemy"; also known as Ocho-cama and Ah-oochy Kah-mah, among other variations) was a Tolkepaya Yavapai leader who was arrested for taking part in the Wickenburg Massacre. Fighting broke out between soldiers as they attempted to arrest the Yavapai leader, and Ohatchecama's brother was killed. The next day, Ohatchecama was seriously wounded while trying to escape and was reported dead, but survived his injuries and later turned up at Fort Date Creek.
