= Yavapai–Apache Nation =

Federally recognized Indian nation in Arizona

Yavapai–Apache Nation Wipuhk’a’bah (Havasupai–Hualapai) Dilzhę́’é (Western Apache)
- Indian reservation
- The Yavapai–Apache reservations are five small areas in eastern Yavapai County, Arizona.
- Constitution: April 13, 1992; 34 years ago
- Capital: Camp Verde, Arizona

Government
  - Chairman: Tanya Lewis

Area
  - Total: 642 acres (260 ha)

Population
  - Total: 1,615
- Demonym: Yavapai–Apache
- Time zone: UTC−07:00 (MST)
- Area code(s): 928
- Website: yavapai-apache.org

The Yavapai–Apache Nation (Havasupai–Hualapai: Wipuhk’a’bah, Western Apache: Dilzhę́’é) is a federally recognized Native American tribe of Yavapai and Apache people in the Verde Valley of Arizona. Tribal members share two culturally distinct backgrounds and speak two Indigenous languages, the Yavapai language and the Western Apache language.

== History ==
The Yavapai–Apache have lived in the American Southwest since 1100 CE. Their traditional ecological knowledge allowed them to flourish as hunter-gatherers. Chief Yuma Frank, Chief Viola Jimulla, and Carlos Montezuma were some of the first leaders of the Yavapai–Apache Nation. Beginning in 1865, the Yavapai were relocated to several reservations: Colorado River, Fort McDowell, Rio Verde, San Carlos, Camp Verde, Middle Verde, Clarkdale, and Prescott.

== Government ==
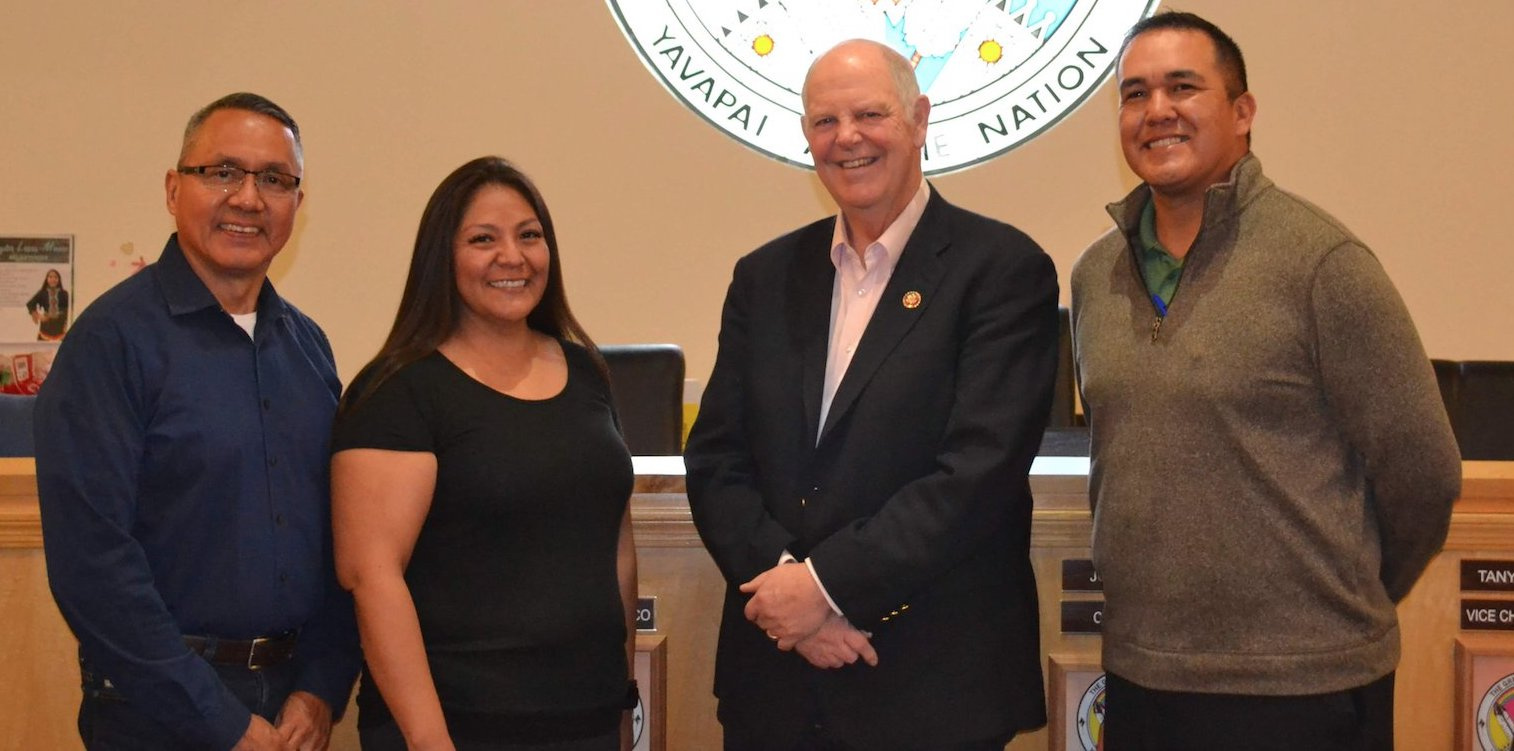
Yavapai–Apache Nation leadership with Congressman Tom O'Halleran in 2020

The Yavapai–Apache government has three branches: Executive, Legislative, and Judiciary. The executive branch consists of the chairperson, Vice Chairperson, Council Secretary, and Council Treasurer, who oversees the administration of tribal business. The legislative branch is the Tribal Council, which has nine members, including the chairperson and the Vice Chairperson. The council's powers include developing laws, codes, and ordinances and representing the Yavapai-Apache people in all matters concerning their health and welfare. The tribal membership elects the council, which consists of the chairperson, vice chairperson, and seven other Tribal Council members. The judicial branch consists of a Tribal Court, a Court of Appeals, and other lower courts considered necessary by the Tribal Council. The judiciary interprets and applies the laws of the Nation and resolves legal matters.

In 2024, Tanya Lewis serves as the chairwoman and Ricardo Pacheco is the vice chairman.

== Reservation ==
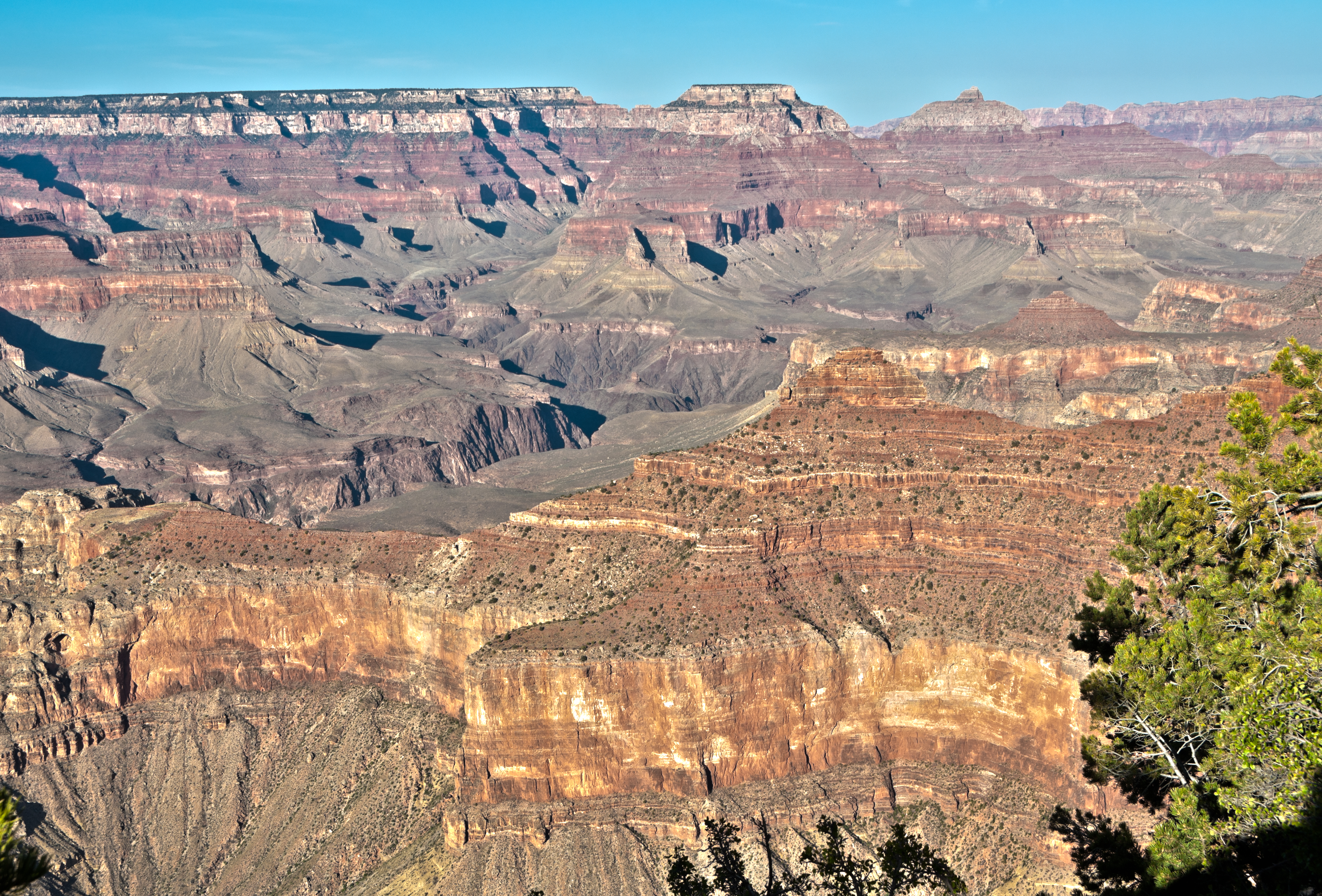
The Rim Trail, just east of Yavapai Point on the South Rim of the Grand Canyon

The Yavapai–Apache Nation Indian Reservation, at 34°37′10″N 111°53′46″W, consists of five non-contiguous parcels of land located in three separate communities in eastern Yavapai County. The two largest sections, 576 acres (233 ha) together – almost 90 percent of the reservation's territory, are in the town of Camp Verde (Yavapai: ʼMatthi:wa; Western Apache: Gambúdih). Smaller sections are located in the town of Clarkdale 60.17 acres (24.35 ha), and the unincorporated community of Lake Montezuma (5.8 acres (2.3 ha)). The reservation's total land area is 642 acres (260 ha). The total resident population of the reservation was 743 persons as of the 2000 census. The 2010 Census reported 1,615 people on the reservation. Of these, 512 lived in Camp Verde, 218 in Clarkdale, and only 13 in Lake Montezuma.

== Communities ==
- Camp Verde (Yavapai: ʼMatthi:wa; Western Apache: Gambúdih)
- Clarkdale (Yavapai: Saupkasuiva)
- Lake Montezuma (Rimrock)

== Attractions ==
The Yavapai–Apache Nation operates the Cliff Castle Casino, a popular gaming, recreation, dining and lodging attraction in the Verde Valley.

== Education ==
The reservation is served by the Camp Verde Unified School District.

== See also ==
- Yavapai people
- Apache people
- Dilzhe'e Apache
