= Yavapai =

Indigenous people from Arizona, U.S.

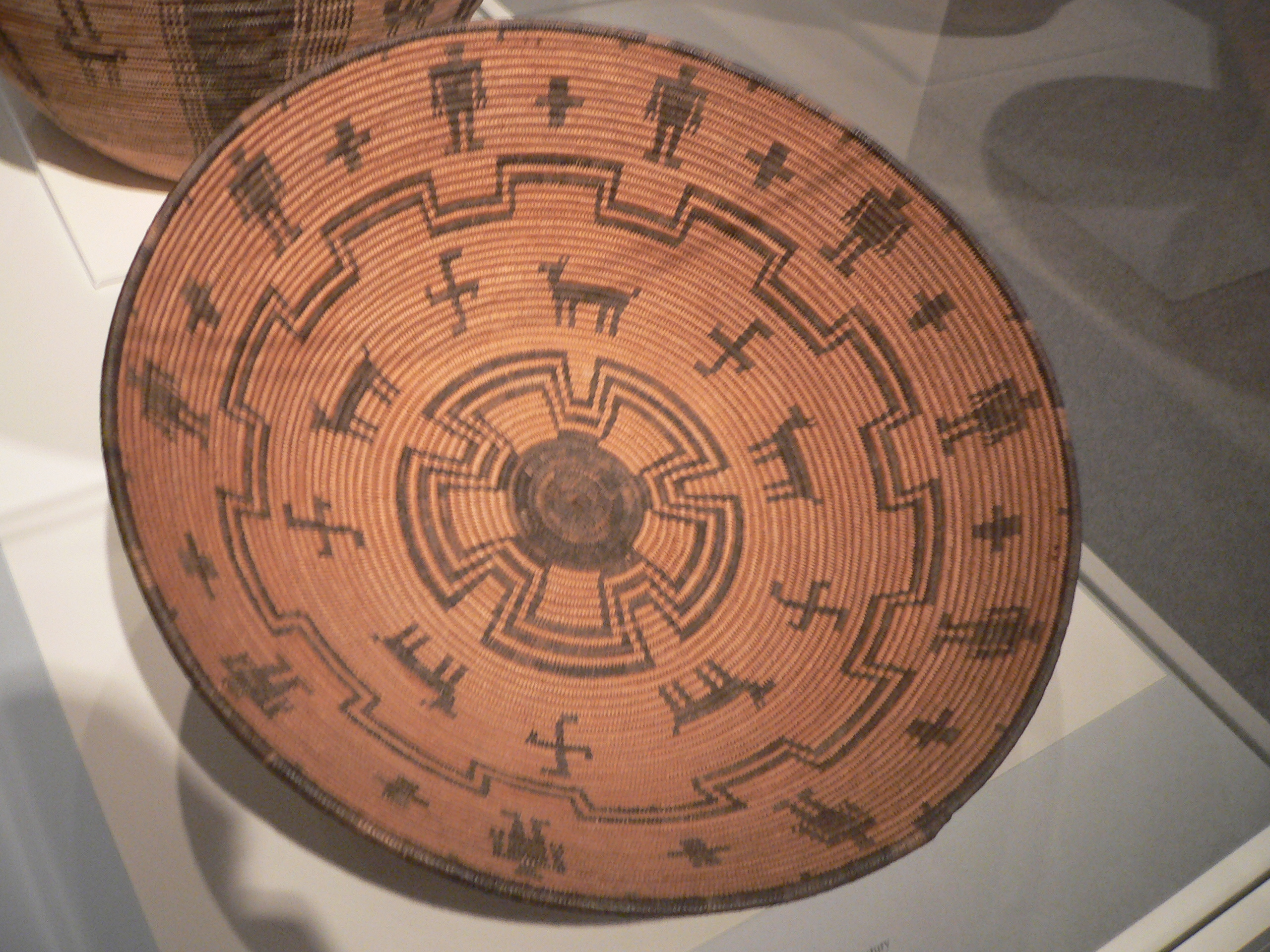
- An early 20th-century Yavapai basket bowl woven of willow and reed

Total population
- 1,550 (1992)

Regions with significant populations
- United States (Arizona)

Languages
- Yavapai (three dialects of Upland Yuman language), English

Religion
- Indigenous religion, Christianity

Related ethnic groups
- Havasupai, Hualapai, Mohave, Western Apache

The Yavapai (/ˈjævəˌpaɪ/ YAV-ə-py) are a Native American tribe in Arizona. Their Yavapai language belongs to the Upland Yuman branch of the proposed Hokan language family.

Today Yavapai people are enrolled in the following federally recognized tribes:

- Fort McDowell Yavapai Nation
- Yavapai-Apache Nation of the Camp Verde Indian Reservation
- Yavapai-Prescott Indian Tribe.

The Yavapai historically controlled about 10 million acres of land in west-central Arizona. Their lands bordered the San Francisco Peaks to the north, the Pinaleno Mountains and Mazatzal Mountains to the southeast, the Colorado River to the west, and almost to the Gila River and the Salt River to the south.

The Yavapai historically were divided into geographically distinct bands or subtribes:

- Kewevkepaya, Gwev G’paaya (southeastern)
- Tolkepaya, Tolkepaye (western)
- Wipukepa, Wiipukpaa (northeastern), also known as the Verde Valley Yavapai
- Yavepé, Yaavpe (northwestern)

== Name ==
The name Yavapai comes from the Mojave language term Enyaéva Pai, translating as "People of the Sun".

American settlers often mistakenly called the Yavapai "Mohave-Apache," "Yuma-Apache," or "Tonto-Apache".

== Language ==
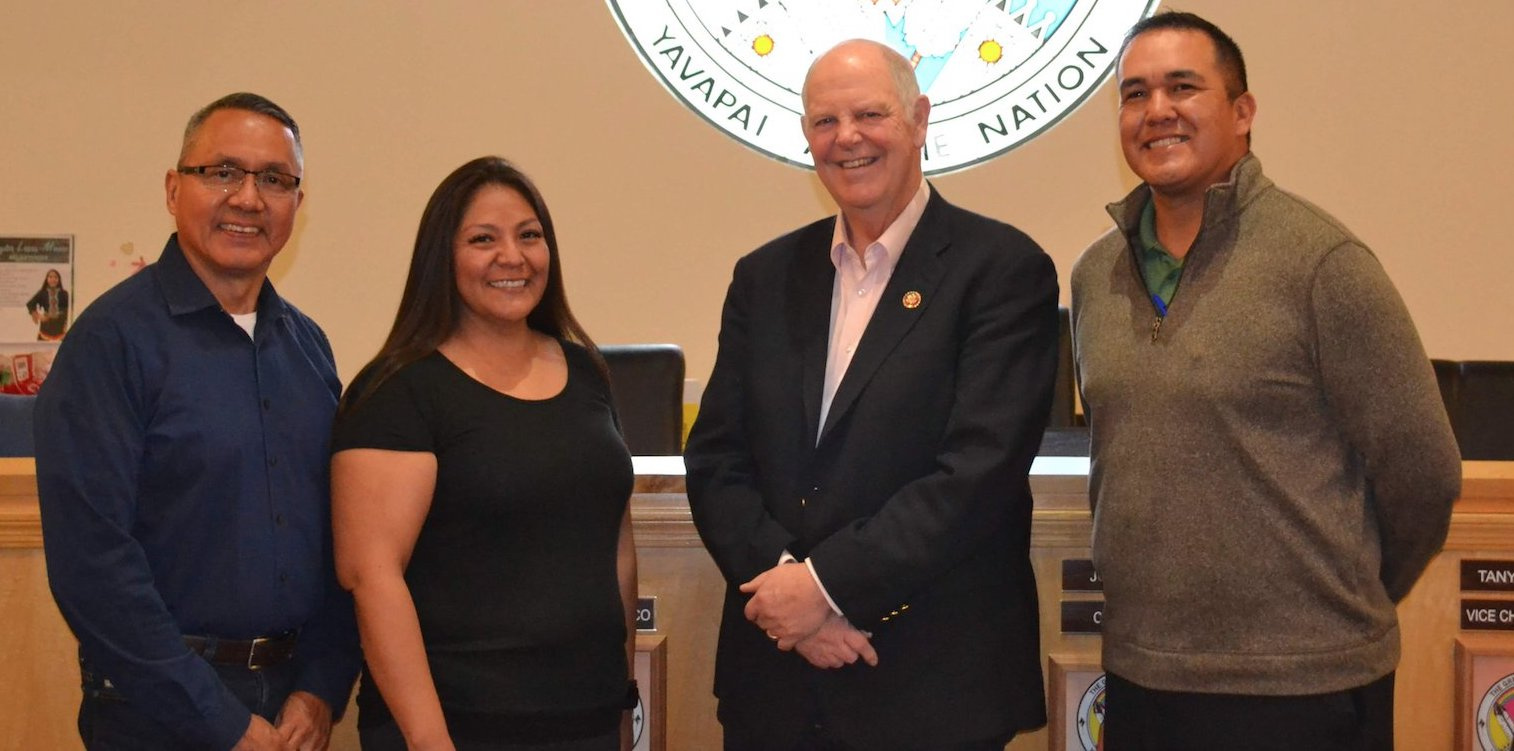
Yavapai-Apache Nation former Chairman Jon Huey and current Chairwoman Tanya Lewis (then Vice Chairwoman) meeting with Rep. Tom O'Halleran (AZ) and colleague, 2020

The Yavapai language is one of three dialects of the Upland Yuman language, itself a member of the Pai branch of the Yuman language family. Their Upland Yuman language may be part of the proposed Hokan language family.

The language includes four dialects, known as Kwevkepaya (Southern), Tolkepaya (Western), Wipukepa (Verde Valley), and Yavepe (Prescott).

== Population ==
The Yavapai population was about 1,550 in 1992. In C.E. 1500, by some estimates there were perhaps 1,500 Yavapai.

== History ==
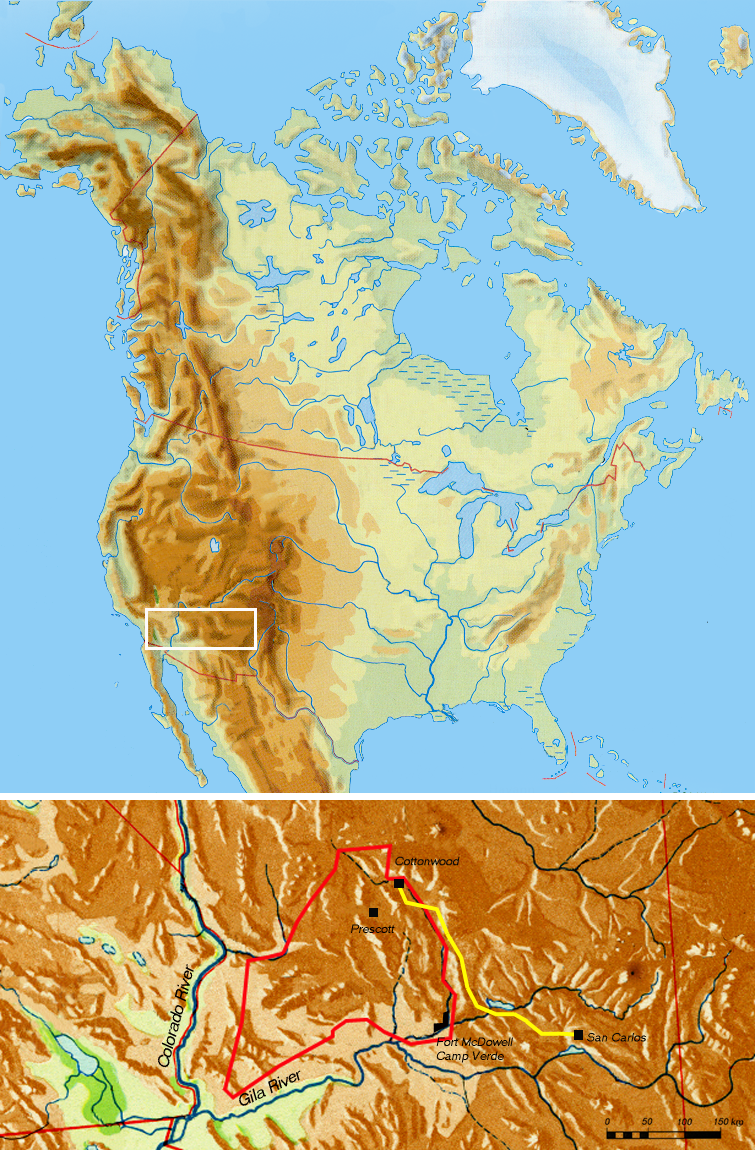
The former territory of the Yavapai. The yellow line shows the forced march to the San Carlos Apache Reservation.

Their creation story explains that Yavapai people originated "in the beginning," or "many years ago," when either a tree or a maize plant sprouted from the ground in what is now Montezuma Well, bringing the Yavapai into the world.

Western archeologists believe the Yavapai derived from Patayan (Hakataya) peoples who migrated east from the Colorado River region to become Upland Yumans. Archeological and linguistic evidence suggests that they split off to develop as the Yavapai somewhere around CE 1300.

=== 16th century ===
The first recorded contact with Yavapai was in 1583, when Hopi guides led Spanish explorer Antonio de Espejo, to Jerome Mountain. De Espejo sought gold and was disappointed to find only copper. In 1598, Hopi brought Marcos Farfán de los Godos and his group to the same mines, to their excitement. Farfán referred to the Yavapai as cruzados because of the crosses painted on their heads.

=== 17th and 18th centuries ===
Juan de Oñate had led a group through Yavapai lands in 1598 and went back again in 1604–1605, looking for a route to the sea which Yavapai had told them about.

Warfare was not uncommon in the Yavapai world, and they made changing alliances for security. Wi:pukba (Wipukepa) and Guwevkabaya (Kwevkepaya) bands formed alliances with Western Apache bands, to attack and defend against raids by the Akimel O'odham and Maricopa bands from the south. Because of the greater strength of the Akimel O'odham/Maricopa, Yavapai/Apache raids generally conducted small-scale quick raids, followed by a retreat to avoid counterattack. The Yavapai defended their lands against Akimel O'odham incursions when the Akimel O'odham would invade to harvest saguaro fruits.

To the north and northwest, Wi:pukba and Yavbe' bands had off-and-on relations with the Pai people throughout most of their history. Though Pai and Yavapai both spoke Upland Yuman dialects, and had a common cultural history, each people had tales of a dispute that separated them from each other. According to Pai oral history, the dispute began with a "mudball fight between children." Scholars believe this split occurred around 1750.

In the intervening time, through contact with other tribes that had more European contact, the Yavapai began to adopt certain European practices. They raised some livestock and planted crops, also adopting some metal tools and weaponry. In a syncretic way, they adopted elements of Christianity. An estimated quarter of the population died as a result of smallpox in the 17th and 18th centuries, smaller losses than for some tribes, but substantial enough to disrupt their societies. With the use of guns and other weapons, they began to change methods of warfare, diplomacy, and trade. They used livestock raiding, either from other tribes such as the Maricopa, or from Spanish settlements to their south, to supplement their economy. They often acquired human captives in raids, whom they traded as slaves to Spaniards in exchange for European goods.

Spanish missionary Francisco Garcés lived among the Yavapai in 1776.

=== 19th century ===
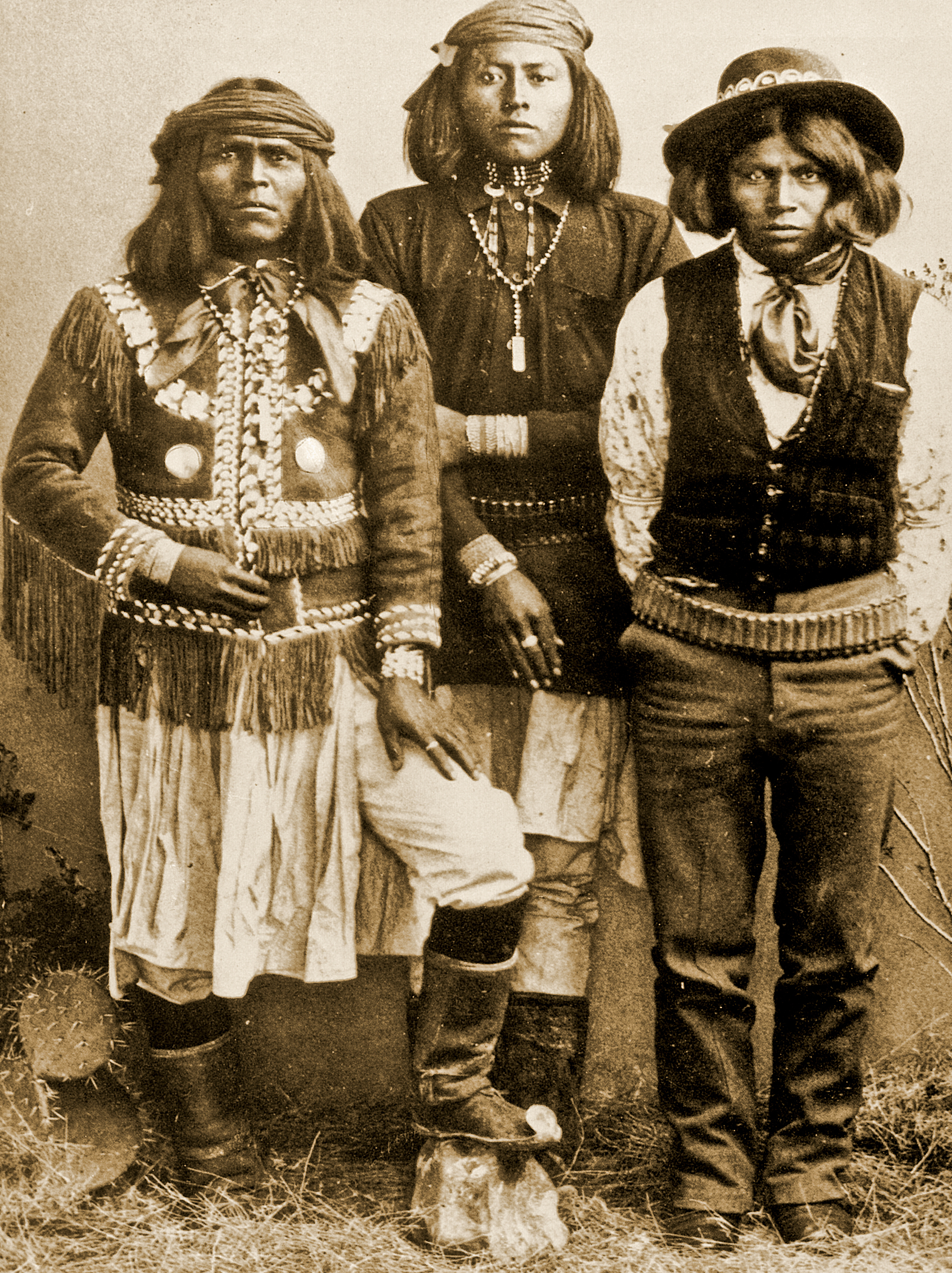
Photograph of three young Yavapai men by A. Miller, National Anthropological Archives

In the 1820s, American beaver trappers, having depleted the beaver population of the Rocky Mountains, began entering Yavapai territory. They trapped beaver along the Salt, Gila, and Bill Williams rivers. When Kit Carson and Ewing Young led a trapping group through the territory in 1829, the group was "nightly harassed..." Traps were stolen and some of their horses and mules killed.

The first fighting between US troops and Yavapai came in early 1837, when the Tolkepaya joined with their Quechan neighbors to defend against Major Samuel Heintzelman over a Quechan ferry crossing on the Colorado River. The Quechan used the ferry to transport settlers over the river, into California. After they killed a group led by John Glanton, who had taken over the crossing, the US government retaliated by burning the fields of the Quechans, and taking control of the crossing.

According to Thomas Sweeney, the Tolkepaya would tell US officers encountered in Quechan territory, that they had a 30-day march to their own territory. They wanted to discourage US encroachment on their land.

Following the declaration of war against Mexico in May 1845 and especially after the claim by the US of southwest lands under the Treaty of Guadalupe-Hidalgo, US military incursions into Yavapai territory greatly increased. After gold was discovered in California in 1849, more Euro-American emigrants passed through Yavapai territory than ever had before. Despite the thousands of emigrants passing through their territory, the Yavapai avoided contact with them.

The last big battle between the Colorado–Gila River alliances took place in August 1857, when about 100 Yavapai, Quechan, and Mohave warriors attacked a settlement of Maricopa near Pima Butte. After overwhelming the Maricopa, the Yavapai left. A group of Akimel O'odham, supplied with guns and horses from US troops, arrived and routed the remaining Mohave and Quechans.

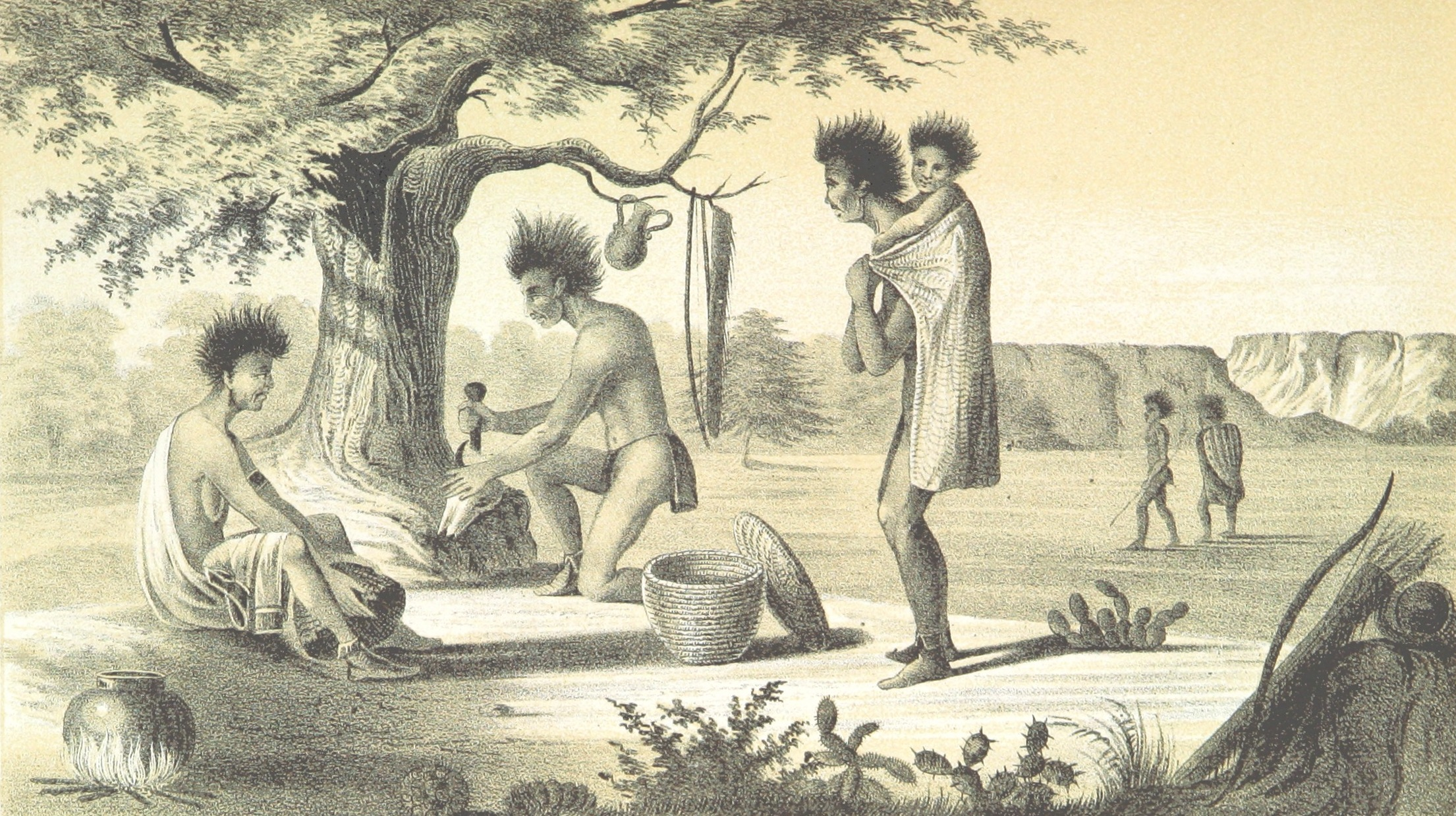
A drawing from 1851 of Yavapai people made by Sitgreaves' first topographical mission across Arizona

In 1851, a group of Yavapai attacked American settlers, the Oatman family. Roys Oatman and his wife were killed, along with four of their seven children. The son, Lorenzo, was left for dead but survived, while sisters Olive Oatman and Mary Ann were later sold to Mojaves as slaves. The story was widely published and increased white settlers' fears of attack in Arizona.

The Yavapai Wars, or the Tonto Wars, were a series of armed conflicts between the Yavapai and Tonto Apache against the United States in Arizona. The period began no later than 1861, with the arrival of American settlers on Yavapai and Tonto land. At the time, the Yavapai were considered a band of the Western Apache people due to their close relationship with tribes such as the Tonto and Pinal. From 366 to 489 Yavapai were killed in massacres, and 375 perished in Indian Removal deportations out of 1,400 remaining Yavapai.

When in early 1863, the Walker Party discovered gold in Lynx Creek (near present-day Prescott, Arizona), it set off a chain of events that would have White settlements along the Hassayampa and Agua Fria Rivers, the nearby valleys, as well as in Prescott, and Fort Whipple would be built, all by the end of the year, and all in traditional Yavapai territory.

The Americans, led by General George Crook, fought against the Yavapai and Tonto Apache in 1872–73. Aided by Pai scouts, the Americans killed many of the Yavapai and forced them onto a reservation at Camp Verde, where a third of the surviving Yavapai died from disease. The Skeleton Cave massacre occurred in 1872. In 1875, they were forcibly relocated to the San Carlos Reservation in the March of Tears. After only 25 years, their population of 1,500 plummeted to only 200 survivors.

=== 20th century ===
By 1900, most Yavapai left the San Carlos Reservation to return to the Verde Valley and neighboring homelands.

== Culture ==
=== Cuisine ===
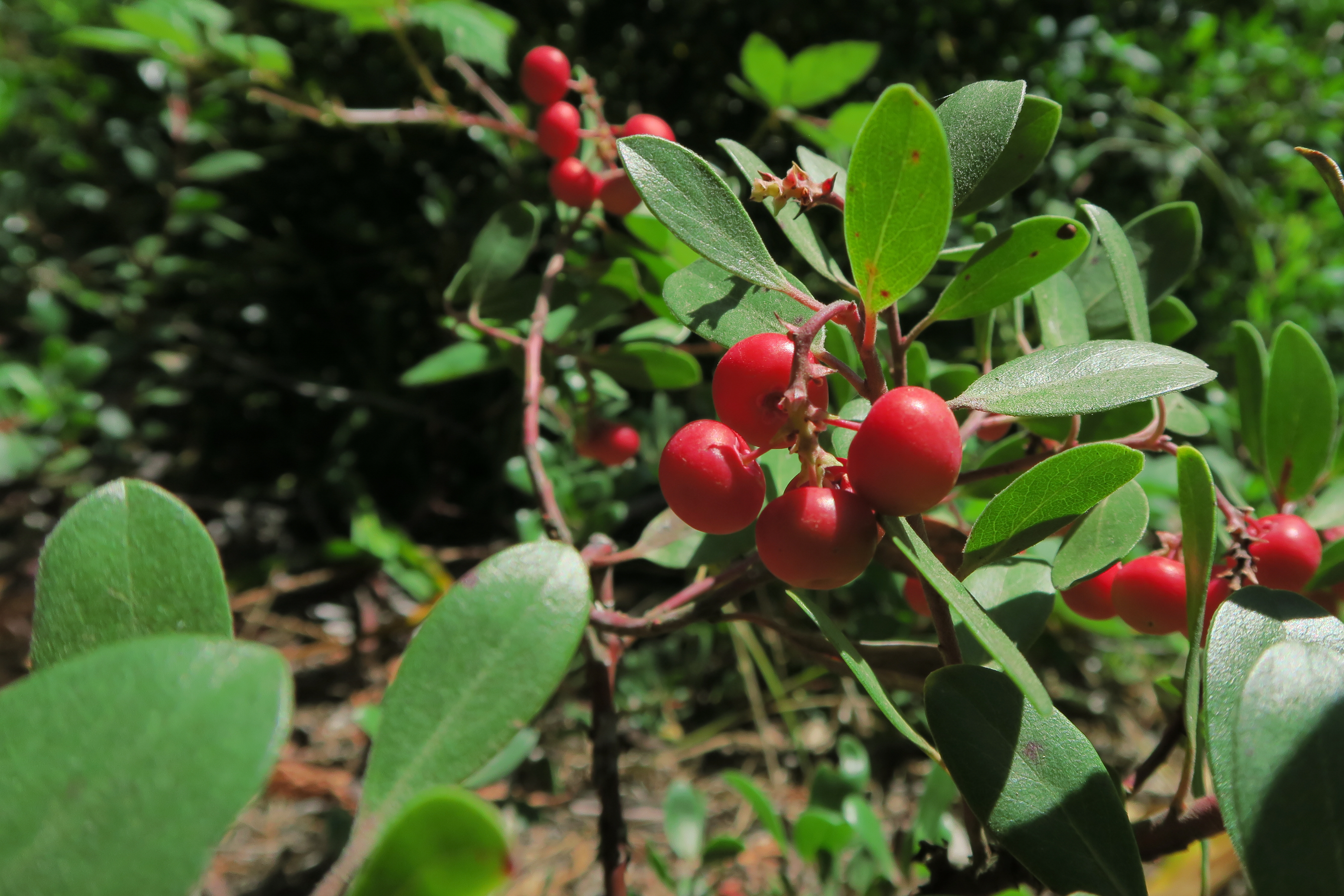
Manzanita berries

Before being confined to reservations, the Yavapai were mainly hunter-gatherers, following an annual migration to different areas to follow the ripening of different edible plants and movement of game animals. Some communities supplemented this diet with small-scale cultivation of the "three sisters" (maize, squash, and beans) in fertile streambeds. In particular, the Tolkepaya, who lived in lands that were less supportive of food gathering, turned to agriculture more than other Yavapai. They had to work to cultivate crops, as their land was also less supportive of agriculture. In turn, Tolkepaya often traded items such as animal skins, baskets, and agave to Quechan groups for food.

The main plant foods gathered were walnuts, saguaro fruits, juniper berries, acorns, sunflower seeds, manzanita berries and apples, hackberries, the bulbs of the Quamash, and the greens of the Lamb's quarters, Scrophularia, and Lupinus plants. Agave was the most crucial harvest, as it was the only plant food available from late fall through early spring. The hearts of the plant were roasted in stone-lined pits, and could be stored for later use. Primary animals hunted were deer, rabbit, jackrabbit, quail, and woodrat. Fish and water-borne birds were eschewed by most Yavapai groups. Some groups of Tolkepaya began eating fish after contact with their Quechan neighbors.

=== Dances ===
The Yavapai practiced traditional dances such as the Mountain Spirit Dance, War Dances, Victory Dances and Social Dances. The Mountain Spirit dance was a masked dance, which was used for guidance or healing of a sick person. The masked dancers represented Mountain Spirits, who dwell in Four Peaks, McDowell Mountains, Red Mountain (near Fort McDowell), Mingus Mountain-(Black Hills) near Camp Verde, and Granite Mountain near present-day Prescott. The Mountain Spirits also dwell in the caves of Montezuma Castle and Montezuma Well in the Verde Valley.

Yavapai also participate in dances and singing shared with neighboring tribes such as the Apache Sunrise Dance and the Bird Singing and Dancing of the Mojave people.

- The Sunrise Dance Ceremony may have come to the Yavapai through the Apache. with Apache and Yavapai often intermarried and adopted elements of each other's cultures; these two tribes reside together on the Camp Verde and Fort McDowell reservations. The Sunrise Dance is a four-day rite-of-transition for young Apache girls, which typically takes place from March through October. The sunrise dance is an ancient practice, unique to the Apache. It is related to the Changing Woman, a powerful figure in Apache culture associated with longevity. The power of Changing Woman is transferred to the pubescent girl through songs sung by the medicine man. A medicine man is joined by other tribal members in singing a series of songs, up to 32 which are believed to have first been sung by Changing Woman.
- Bird Singing and Dancing: Originally part of the culture of the Mojave people of the Colorado River region, bird singing and dancing has been adopted by modern Yavapai culture. Bird singing and dancing does not belong to the Yavapai people as a whole but this practice has been picked up by different tribes of the Yuman family. According to Mohave elders, the bird songs tell a story. An entire night is needed to sing the whole cycle, from sun down to sun up. This story tells the creation of the Yuman people and how they came to be. Bird songs are sung accompanied by a gourd, usually painted with various designs and made with a handle made of cottonwood. Modern bird singing and dancing is used for various purposes such as mourning, celebration and social purposes.

=== Historical housing ===
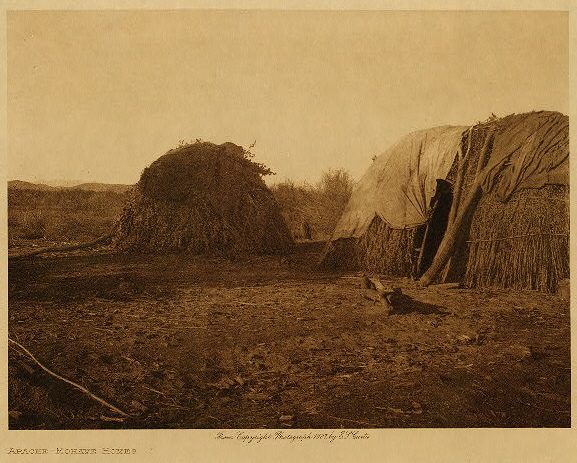
Yavapai homes

The Yavapai built brush shelter dwellings called Wa'm bu nya:va (Wom-boo-nya-va). In summer, they built simple lean-tos without walls. During winter months, closed huts (called uwas) would be built of ocotillo branches or other wood and covered with animal skins, grasses, bark, and/or dirt. In the Colorado River area, Tolkepaya built Uwađ a'mađva, a rectangular hut, that had dirt piled up against its sides for insulation, and a flat roof. They also sought shelter in caves or abandoned pueblos to escape the cold.

=== Precolonial sociopolitical organization ===
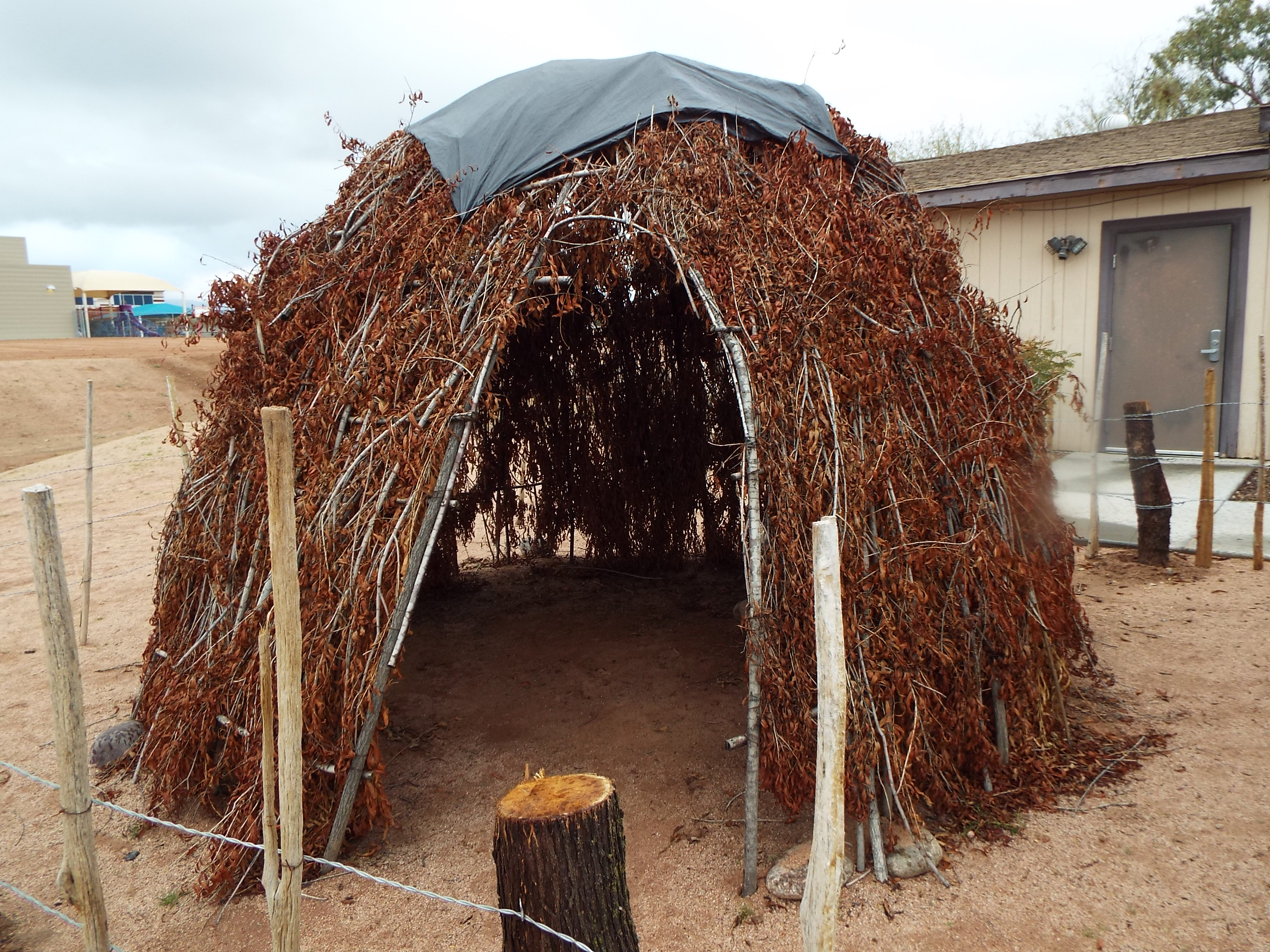
A replica of a historical Yavapai brush shelter

The Yavapai main sociopolitical organization were local groups of extended families, which were identified with certain geographic regions in which they resided. These local groups would form bands in times of war, raiding or defense. For most of Yavapai history, the family was the focal group, be it the nuclear family, or extended. This is partly because most food-providing sites were not large enough to support larger populations. However, exceptions are known.

Near Fish Creek, Arizona, was Ananyiké (Quail's Roost), a Guwevkabaya summer camp that supported upwards of 100 people at a time. It supported a prickly pear fruit harvest, and hunting of rabbits and woodrats. In winter, camps were formed of larger groups, consisting of several families. They separated into smaller groups at the end of winter, in time for the spring harvest.

Government among the Yavapai tended to be informal. There were no tribal and hand chiefs. Certain men became recognized leaders based on others choosing to follow them, heed their advice, and support their decisions. Men who were noted for their skills as warriors were called mastava ("not afraid") or bamulva ("person who goes forward"). Other warriors were willing to follow such men into combat. Some Yavapai men were noted for their wisdom and speaking ability. Called bakwauu ("person who talks"), they would settle disputes within the camp and advise others on the selection of campsites, work ethics, and food production.

=== Yavapai bands ===
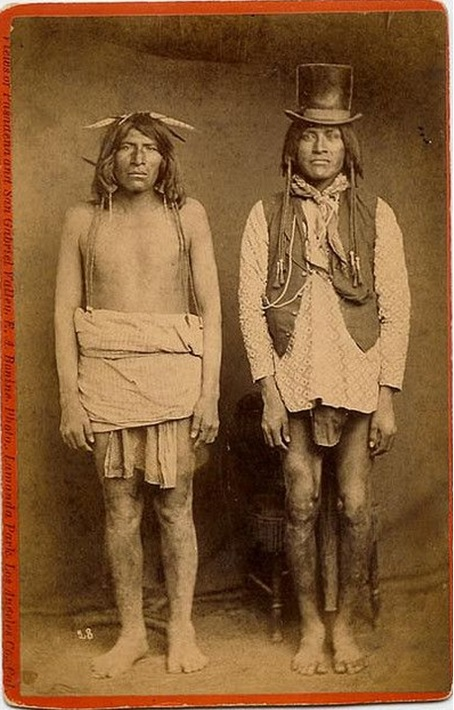
Two Yavapai men, 1889

The Yavapai have never been unified by a single central government. Historically they were four separate autonomous bands, connected through kinship and shared cultures and language, which were in turn composed of clans. The bands or subtribes allied with and traded with external tribes independently of each other. These four subtribes are the Kewevkepaya (southeastern), Tolkepaya (western), Wipukepa (northeastern), Yavepé (northwestern)

The Kewevkepaya lived in the southeast, along the Verde River south of the Mazatzal Mountains and the Salt River to the Superstition Mountains and the western Sierra Estrella Mountains, including the southern and western slopes of the Pinal Mountains, the McDowell Mountains, Dripping Springs, the Four Peaks and Mazatzal Mountains in south-western Arizona. They intermarried with the Tonto Apache and San Carlos Apache and spoke their language in addition to their own. They were also called the Guwevkabaya, Kwevkepaya, Kwevikopaya, or Southern Yavapai.

The Tolkepaya lived in the western Yavapai territory along the Hassayampa River in southwestern Arizona. They maintained close ties to the Quechan and Mojave. They were also called Ɖo:lkabaya, Tulkepaia, or Western Yavapai.

The Wipukepa lived in the northeast, in Oak Creek Canyon and along Fossil Creek and Rio Verde, Arizona, in north-central Arizona. They often intermarried with the Tonto Apache and spoke their language as well as Yavapai. They were also called the Wipukpaya or Wi:pukba, which translates as "Foot of the Mountain (Red Buttes) People" or "People from the Foot of the Red Rock".

The Yavapé lived in the northwestern Yavapai territory from Williamson (Williamson Valley) south of the Bradshaw Mountains to the Agua Fria River. They were also called Northwestern Yavapai, Yavbe, Central Yavapai, or the "real Yavapai", because they were little culturally influenced by neighboring peoples.

A fifth Yavapai band, no longer in existence, was the Mađqwarrpaa or "Desert People." Members of this band intermarried with the Mojave and Quechan peoples. The Yavapai have much in common with their linguistic relatives to the north, the Havasupai and the Hualapai.

=== Interaction with neighboring Apache ===
The Wi:pukba ("People from the Foot of the Red Rock") and Guwevkabaya lived alongside the Tonto Apache of central and western Arizona. The Tonto Apache lived usually east of the Verde River and most of the Yavapai bands lived west of it. The Wi:pukba tribal areas in the San Francisco Peaks, along the Upper Verde River, Oak Creek Canyon and Fossil Creek, overlapped with those of the Northern Tonto Apache.

Likewise the Guwevkabaya shared hunting and gathering grounds east of the Verde River, along Fossil Creek, East Verde River, Salt River, and in the Superstition Mountains, Sierra Ancha and Pinaleno Mountains with Southern Tonto Apache and bands of the San Carlos Apache. Therefore, they formed bilingual mixed-tribal bands. Outsiders, such as the Spanish, Mexicans and Americans distinguished the peoples primarily by language, but often referred to them as one name. The Apache spoke the Tonto dialect of the Western Apache language (Ndee biyati' / Nnee biyati'), and the Yavapai spoke the Yavapai language, a branch of Upland Yuman. Living together in common rancherias, families identified as Apache or Yavapai based on their “Mother tongue.” Both groups had matrilineal kinship systems, with children considered born into the mother's family and clan, with inheritance and property figured through the maternal line.

Most of the people in these mixed groups spoke both languages. The headman of each band usually had two names, one from each culture. Therefore, the enemy Navajo to the north called both, the Tonto Apache and their allies, the Yavapai, Dilzhʼíʼ dinéʼiʼ – "People with high-pitched voices." The ethnic Europeans referred to the Yavapai and Apache together as Tonto Apache. The peoples raided and warred together against enemy tribes such as the Tohono O'odham and the Akimel O'odham.

Scholars cannot tell from records whether the writers of the time, when using the term Tonto Apache, were referring to Yavapai or Apache, or those mixed bands. In addition, the Europeans often referred to the Wi:pukba and Guwevkabaya incorrectly as the Yavapai Apache or Yuma Apache. The Europeans referred to the Tolkepaya, the western group of Yavapai, and the Hualapai (who belonged to the Upland Yuma Peoples), as Yuma Apache or Mohave Apache.

Ethnological writings describe some major physical differences between Yavapai and Tonto Apache peoples. The Yavapai were described as taller, of more muscular build, well-proportioned and thickly featured, while the Tonto Apache were slight and less muscular, smaller of stature and finely featured. The Yavapai women were described as stouter and having "handsomer" faces than the Yuma, in a historic Smithsonian Institution report. The Yavapai often acquired tattoos, but the Apache seldom used tattoos. They created different painted designs on faces. They also had different funeral practices. In clothing, Yavapai moccasins were rounded, whereas those of the Apaches were shaped with pointed toes. Both groups were hunter-gatherers. They left campsites so similar that scholars are seldom able to distinguish between them.

== Yavapai tribes and reservations ==
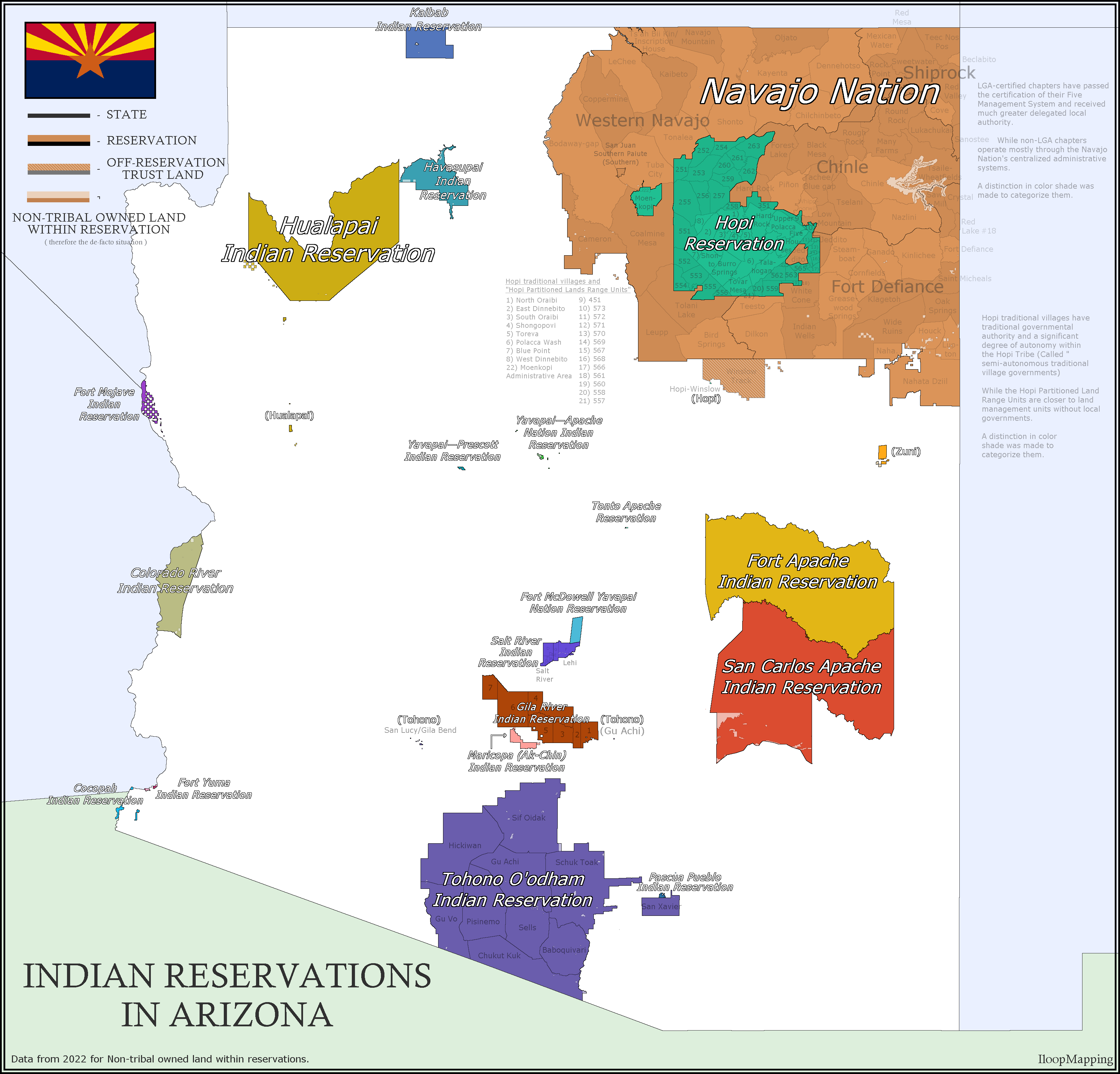
Map of the Yavapai Tribes and neighboring tribes.

=== Yavapai–Apache Nation ===
After being relocated to the Camp Verde Reservation, on the Verde River near Camp Verde, the Yavapai there began to construct irrigation systems (including a five-mile (8 km) long ditch) that functioned well enough to reap sufficient harvests, making the tribe relatively self-sufficient. But contractors that worked with the government to supply the reservations were disappointed, and petitioned to have the reservation revoked. The government complied, and in March 1875, the government closed the reservation, and marched the residents 180 miles (290 km) to the San Carlos reservation. More than 100 Yavapai died during the winter trek.

By the early 20th century, Yavapai were moving away from the San Carlos Reservation, and were requesting permission to live on the grounds of the original Camp Verde Reservation. In 1910, 40 acres (161,874 m^{2}) was set aside as the Camp Verde Indian Reservation, and in the following decade added 248 acres (1,003,620 m^{2}) in two parcels, which became the Middle Verde Indian Reservation. These two reservations were combined in 1937, to form the Camp Verde Yavapai–Apache tribe. Today, the reservation spans 665 acres (2.7 km^{2}), in four separate locales. Tourism contributes greatly to the economy of the tribe, due largely to the presence of many preserved sites, including the Montezuma Castle National Monument. The Yavapai–Apache Nation is the amalgamation of two historically distinct Tribes both of whom occupied the Upper Verde prior to European arrival. The Tonto Apache, calling themselves Dilzhe'e, utilized the lands to the north, east and south; while the Wi:pukba or Northeastern Yavapai were using country to the north, the west and the south. It was the Upper Verde where they overlapped.

=== Yavapai Prescott Indian Reservation ===
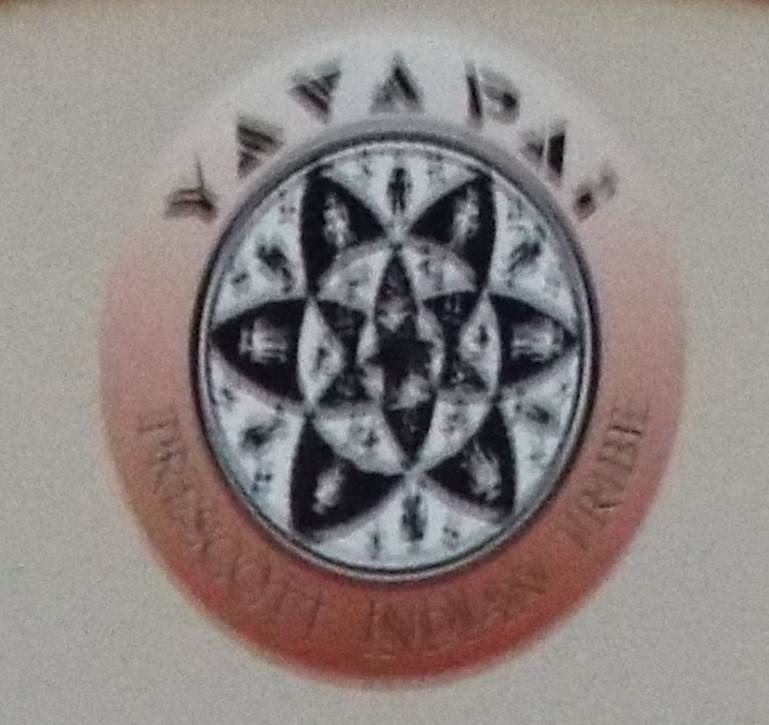
Yavapai-Prescott Tribe

The Yavapai reservation in Prescott was established in 1935, originally consisting of just 75 acres (300,000 m^{2}) of land formerly occupied by the Fort Whipple Military Reserve. In 1956, an additional 1,320 acres (5 km^{2}) were added. Succeeding the tribe's first chief, Sam Jimulla, his wife Viola became the first female chieftess of a North American tribe. Today, the tribe consists of 159 official members. The population consists mainly of the Yavbe'/Yavapé Group of Yavapais.

=== Fort McDowell Reservation ===
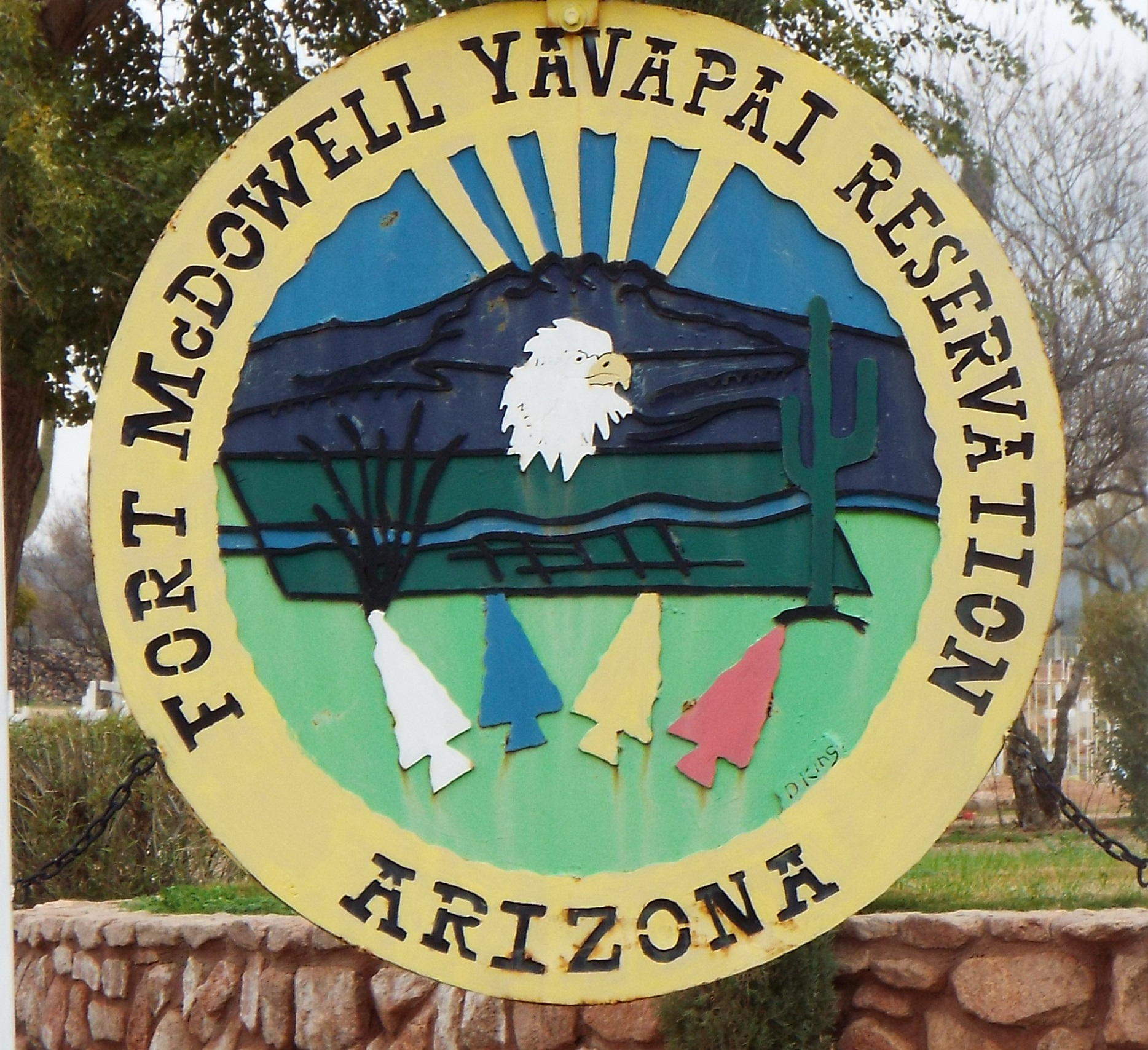
Sign of the Fort McDowell Yavapai Nation

The Fort McDowell Yavapai Nation is located within Maricopa County approximately 20 miles northeast of Phoenix. The reservation came into existence when Theodore Roosevelt had Fort McDowell declared a 40 square miles (100 km^{2}) reservation in 1903, but by 1910, the Office of Indian Affairs was attempting to relocate the residents, to open up the area, and water rights to other interests. A delegation of Yavapai testified to a Congressional Committee against this, and won. Today, the tribal community consists of 900 members, 600 of whom live on the reservation and the remaining 300 who live off the reservation. The Guwevkabaya or Southeastern Yavapai on Fort McDowell Reservation call themselves A'ba:ja - "The People" therefore some anthropologists and linguists believe, that the name Apache for the various Southern Athabascan peoples derives from the self-designation of the Yavapai. The population of Fort McDowell consists of the Guwevkabaya Yavapai.

==== Orme Dam conflict ====
Responding to growth in the Phoenix area, in the early 1970s Arizonan officials proposed to build a dam at the point where the Verde and Salt rivers meet. The dam would have flooded two-thirds of the 24,000-acre (97 km^{2}) reservation. In return, the members of the tribe (at the time consisting of 425 members) were offered homes and cash settlements. But in 1976, the tribe rejected the offer by a vote of 61%, claiming that the tribe would be effectively disbanded by the move. In 1981, after much petitioning of the US government, and a three-day march by approximately 100 Yavapai, the plan to build the dam was withdrawn.

== Notable Yavapai ==
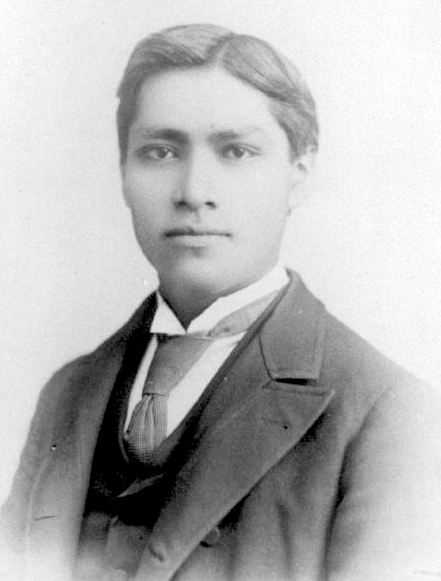
Carlos Montezuma, Wassaja (Yavapai/Apache), doctor, activist

- Viola Jimulla (Prescott Yavapai, 1878–1966), chief of the Yavapai-Prescott Tribe from 1940 to 1966
- Patricia Ann McGee (Yavapai/Hulapai, 1926–1994), chief of the Yavapai-Prescott Tribe
- Carlos Montezuma, Wassaja (Yavapai/Apache, c. 1866–1923), doctor, Indigenous rights activist, co-founder of the Society of American Indians
- Ohatchecama, 19th-century leader in the Wickenburg Massacre
- Pakota, traveled with his nephew Takodawa as spokesman in 1872 to Washington, DC, and met with President Ulysses S. Grant
- Clinton Pattea (Yavapai, 1930–2013), president of the Fort McDowell Yavapai Nation, advocate for Indian gaming
- Y. B. Rowdy (Yavapai, c. 1862–1893), U.S. Army scout, medal of honor recipient

== See also ==
- Indigenous peoples in Arizona
- History of Arizona

== Sources ==
- Braatz, Timothy (2003). Surviving Conquest. University of Nebraska Press. ISBN 978-0-8032-2242-7.
- Campbell, Julie A. (1998). Studies in Arizona History. Tucson, Arizona: Arizona Historical Society. ISBN 0910037388
- Coffer, William E. (1982). Sipapu, the Story of the Indians of Arizona and New Mexico, Van Nostrand Reinhold, ISBN 0-442-21590-8.
- Fenn, Al, "The Story of Mickey Burns", Sun Valley Spur Shopper, September 30, 1971
- Fish, Paul R. and Fish, Suzanne K. (1977). Verde Valley Archaeology: Review & Prospective, Flagstaff: Museum of Northern Arizona, Anthropology research report #8
- Gifford, Edward (1936). Northeastern and Western Yavapai. Berkeley, California: University of California Press.
- Hoxie, Frederick E. (1996). Encyclopedia of North American Indians, Houghton Mifflin Books, ISBN 0-395-66921-9.
- Jones, Terry L. and Klar, Kathryn A. (2007). California Prehistory: Colonization, Culture, and Complexity, Rowman Altamira, ISBN 0-7591-0872-2.
- Kendall, Martha B. (1976). Selected Problems in Yavapai Syntax. New York: Garland Publishing, Inc., ISBN 0-8240-1969-5.
- Nelson Espeland, Wendy (1998). The Struggle for Water: Politics, Rationality, and Identity in the American Southwest, University of Chicago Press. ISBN 0-226-21793-0
- Pritzker, Barry (2000). A Native American Encyclopedia: History, Culture, and Peoples. Oxford: Oxford University Press. pp. 103–05. ISBN 978-0-1951-38771.
- Ruland Thorne, Kate; Rodda, Jeanette; Smith, Nancy R. (2005). Experience Jerome: The Moguls, Miners, and Mistresses of Cleopatra Hill, Primer Publishers, ISBN 0-935810-77-3.
- Salzmann, Zdenek and Salzmann, Joy M. (1997). Native Americans of the Southwest: The Serious Traveler's Introduction to Peoples and Places. Boulder, Colorado: Westview Press. ISBN 0-8133-2279-0
- Swanton, John Reed (1952). The Indian Tribes of North America, US Government Printing Office.
- University of California, Berkeley (1943). University of California Publications in Linguistics, University of California Press.
- Utley, Robert Marshall (1981). Frontiersmen in Blue: The United States Army and the Indian, 1848–1865, University of Nebraska Press, ISBN 0-8032-9550-2.
- Big Dry Wash Battlfield, Arizona at NPS
- Fort McDowell Yavapai Nation, history and culture
- Yavapai-Apache Nation, official site
- Yavapai Prescott Indian Tribe, official site
