= Cliff Castle Casino Hotel =

Casino hotel in Arizona

Cliff Castle Casino

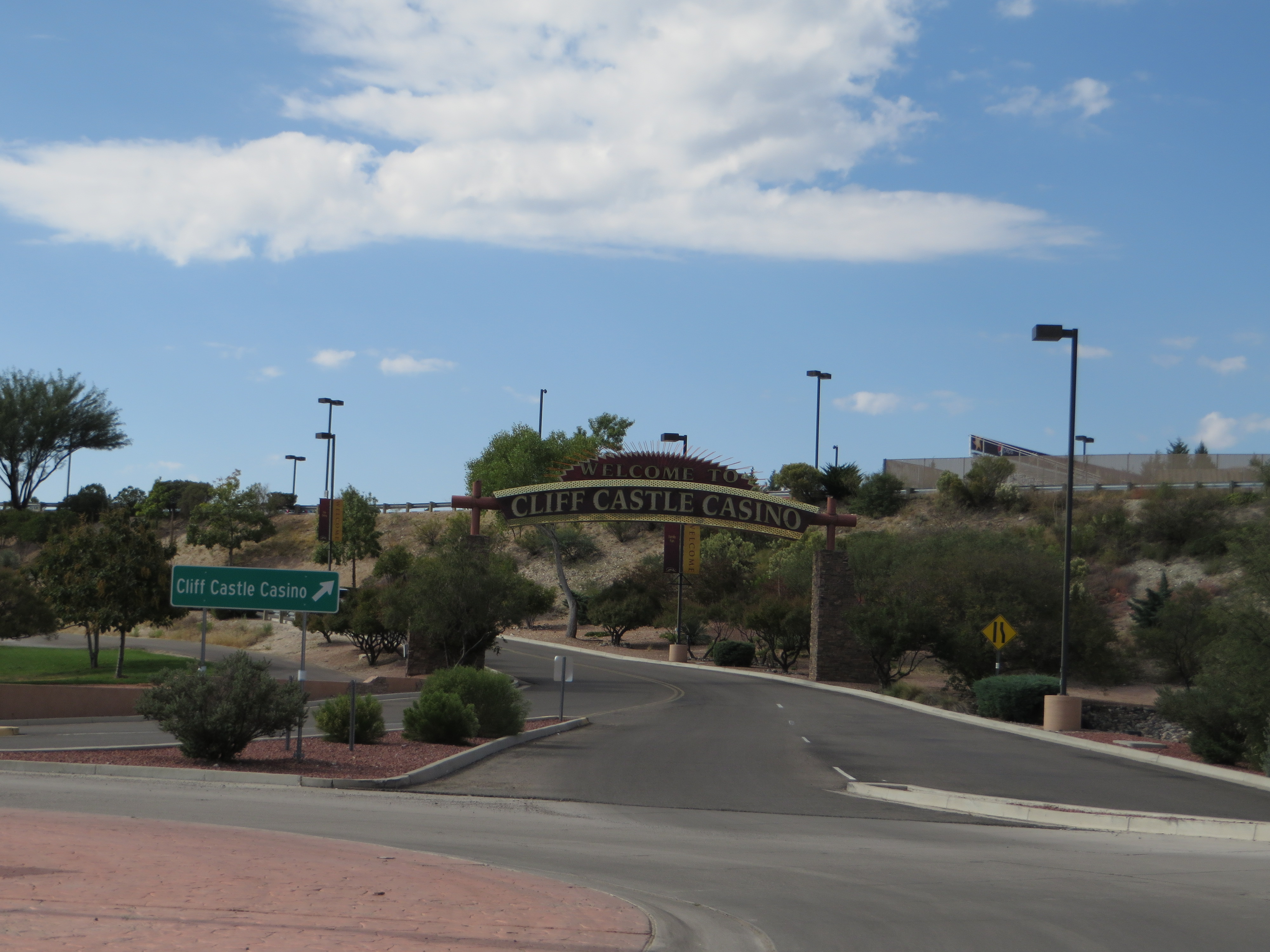
- The entrance to the old casino in 2014

- Interactive map of Cliff Castle Casino
- Address: 555 W Middle Verde Rd, Camp Verde, AZ 86322
- Opening date: 1995 (lodge); February 23, 2018 (hotel)
- No. of rooms: 122
- Owner: Yavapai–Apache Nation
- Coordinates: 34.6065°N 111.8623°W
- Website: www.cliffcastlecasinohotel.com

Cliff Castle Casino Hotel is a casino hotel in Camp Verde, Arizona. It is owned and operated by the Yavapai–Apache Nation. The 122-room building it is in is the first six-story hotel in the Verde Valley.

The casino is one of the largest employers in Verde Valley, employing 430 people. It also receives over 1.4 million guests annually, as of 2015.

== History ==
The Yavapai–Apache Nation opened the casino after Proposition 201, which allowed natives to run gambling operations in Arizona, was passed in 1995. The hotel opened an arcade in 2015. A new, six-story hotel was opened in February 2018, with the older one being renamed to the Cliff Castle Casino Lodge. It had been in development since January 2016. It temporarily closed in March 2020 during the COVID-19 pandemic but reopened in June with restrictions.

== Features ==
The casino offers over 650 slot machines and blackjack. The hotel contains an indoor pool and fitness center. There is also a 20-lane bowling center, a nightclub, an arcade, and four restaurants. There is 114,000 sq ft (10,600 m^{2}) of activity area.
