= Rosa María Farfán =

Mexican education researcher

Rosa María Farfán Márquez is a Mexican researcher in social epistemology and mathematics education, affiliated with CINVESTAV in the Instituto Politécnico Nacional.

== Education and career ==
Farfán has been a researcher for CINVESTAV since 1985. She completed a doctorate through CINVESTAV in 1993, with the dissertation Construcción de la noción de convergencia en ámbitos fenomenológicos vinculados a la ingeniería: Estudio de caso, jointly supervised by Carlos Ímaz Janhke and Fernando Hitt. She was a postdoctoral researcher at Paris Diderot University before returning to CINVESTAV.

She became the founding editor in chief of the journal Revista Latinoamericana de Investigación en Matemática Educativa (Relime) in 1997, remaining editor until 2007.

== Recognition ==
Farfán was elected to the Mexican Academy of Sciences in 2001.
