= Marcos Farfán de los Godos =

16th-century Spanish explorer

Captain Marcos Farfán de los Godos was a Spanish explorer who explored what is now Mexico and Arizona.

== Early life ==
Farfán de los Godos was born in Seville, Spain.

== Career ==
Farfán de los Godos was sent to regions north of present-day Mexico by Juan de Oñate to explore territory and look for mines. In 1598, he went to modern-day Arizona, where he was met by the Hopi people.

Farfán staked out claims on mines near present-day Jerome, Arizona.

Poet Gaspar Pérez de Villagrá mentioned Farfán in one of his poems.
