= Fort McDowell Yavapai Nation =

Coordinates: 33°38′28″N 111°39′52″W

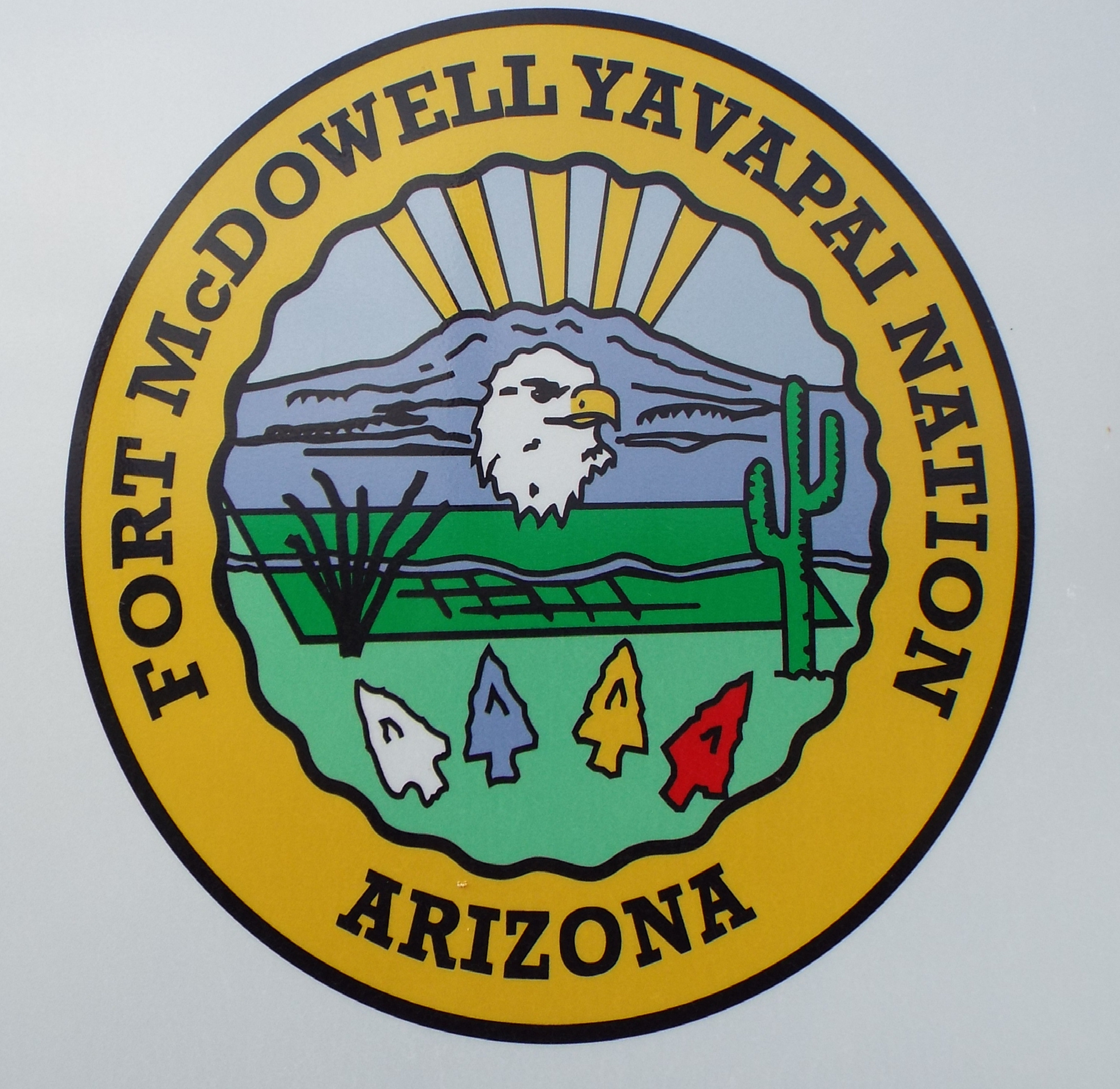
- Location of Fort McDowell Yavapai Nation in Maricopa County, Arizona.

Total population
- 900

Regions with significant populations
- United States (Arizona)

Languages
- Yavapai (three dialects of Upland Yuman language), English

Religion
- traditional tribal religion, Christianity

Related ethnic groups
- other Yavapai people, Havasupai, Hualapai, Mohave, Western Apache

The Fort McDowell Yavapai Nation, formerly the Fort McDowell Mohave-Apache Community of the Fort McDowell Indian Reservation), is a federally recognized tribe and Indian reservation in Maricopa County, Arizona about 23 miles (37 km) northeast of Phoenix.

The reservation was officially created on September 15, 1903 by executive order, on a small parcel carved from the ancestral lands of the Yavapai people, encompassing 24,680 acres (100 km^{2}). The acreage had been part of the Fort McDowell Military Reserve, which had been an important outpost during the Apache Wars. The original inhabitants of the reservation were members of the kwevikopaya, or Southeastern Yavapai, who lived in the nearby Mazatzal-Four Peak and Superstition Mountains area. In the 1970s, there was a proposal to build a dam at the confluence of the Verde and Salt Rivers. Due to the negative effects such a dam would have had on the reservation, the community voted not to sell the land for the dam to the federal government. What would have been called the "Orme Dam" was never built. The reservation celebrates this victory with a rodeo and pow wow each November.

After the passage of the 1988 Indian Gaming Regulatory Act, a casino was built on the reservation. In 1992, agents of the Federal Bureau of Investigation attempted to seize the gaming devices of the casino. This raid took place in conjunction with raids at four other Indian reservations throughout the country. While the raids at the other four reservations went unopposed, members of the Yavapai tribe organized a protest. Using cars, trucks, and large mobile earth moving equipment, they blocked the egress from the property, preventing the trucks from carting off the machines. An agreement was reached between the tribe and Governor Fife Symington allowing the casino to remain in operation.

The outside communities of Fountain Hills and Rio Verde lie adjacent to the reservation. In addition to Rio Verde and Fountain Hills, the reservation's economy is also closely tied to the nearby cities of Mesa, Scottsdale and Phoenix. Also in the area is the Salt River Indian Reservation of the Pima and Maricopa peoples. The tribe operates its own gas station, a large sand and gravel operation, a farm, and the Fort McDowell Casino. Other operations on the reservation include the Wekopa Resort and Conference Center, the Poco Diablo hotel, the Wekopa Golf Course, and Fort McDowell Adventures.

The area now occupied by the reservation was the birthplace of the Native American activist, Carlos Montezuma, who founded the Society of American Indians.

== Ba Dah Mod Jo Cemetery ==
The Ba Dah Mod Jo Cemetery is also referred to as the Fort McDowell Yavapai Nation Cemetery. It was where the soldiers who were stationed in Fort McDowell and who perished were buried. The remains of the "Anglos" who were buried there were later transferred to El Presidio Cemetery in San Francisco after the land was ceded to the Yavapai Nation.

Ba Dah Mod Jo Cemetery

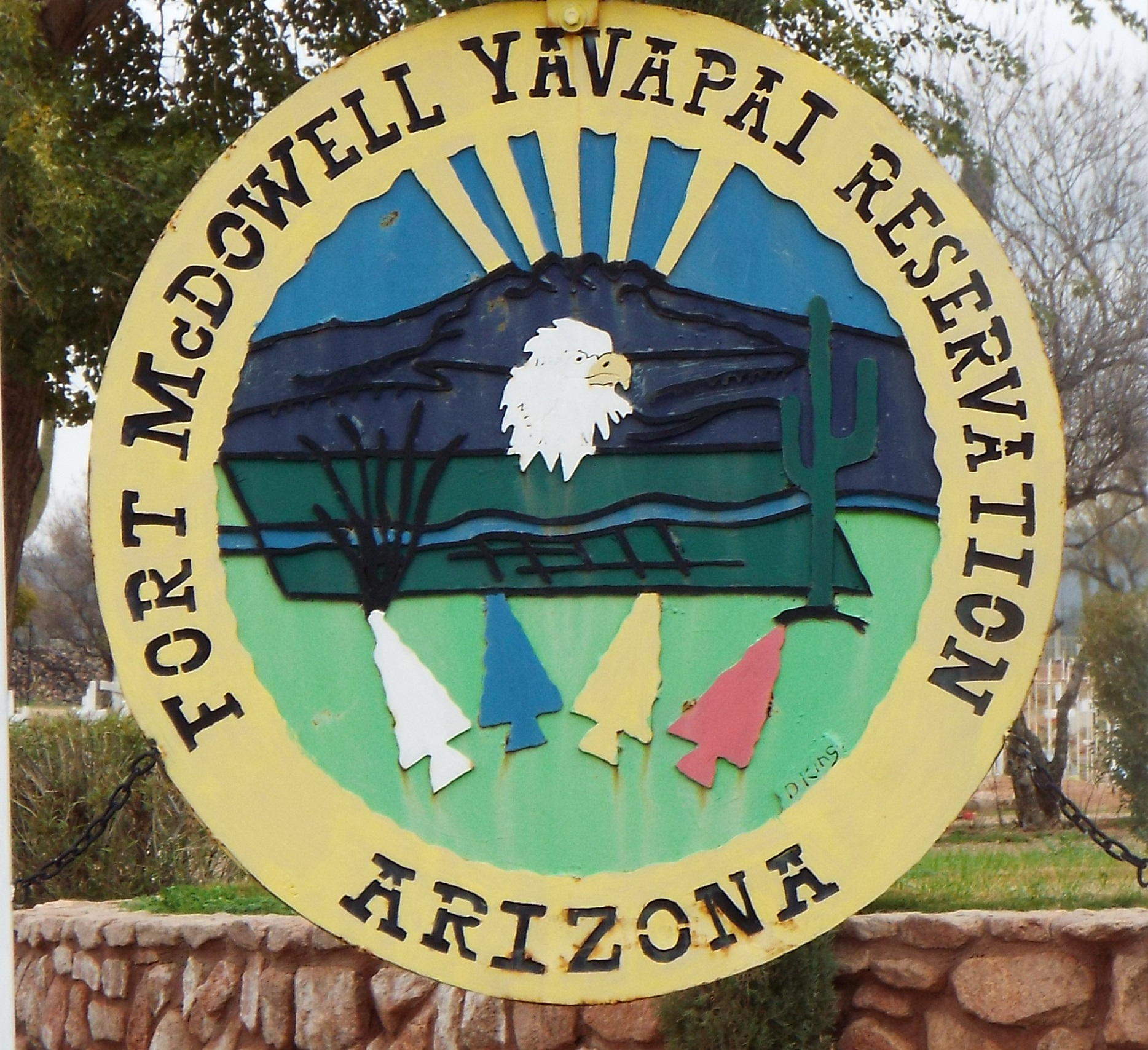
Fort McDowell Yavapai Reservation sign in the cemetery

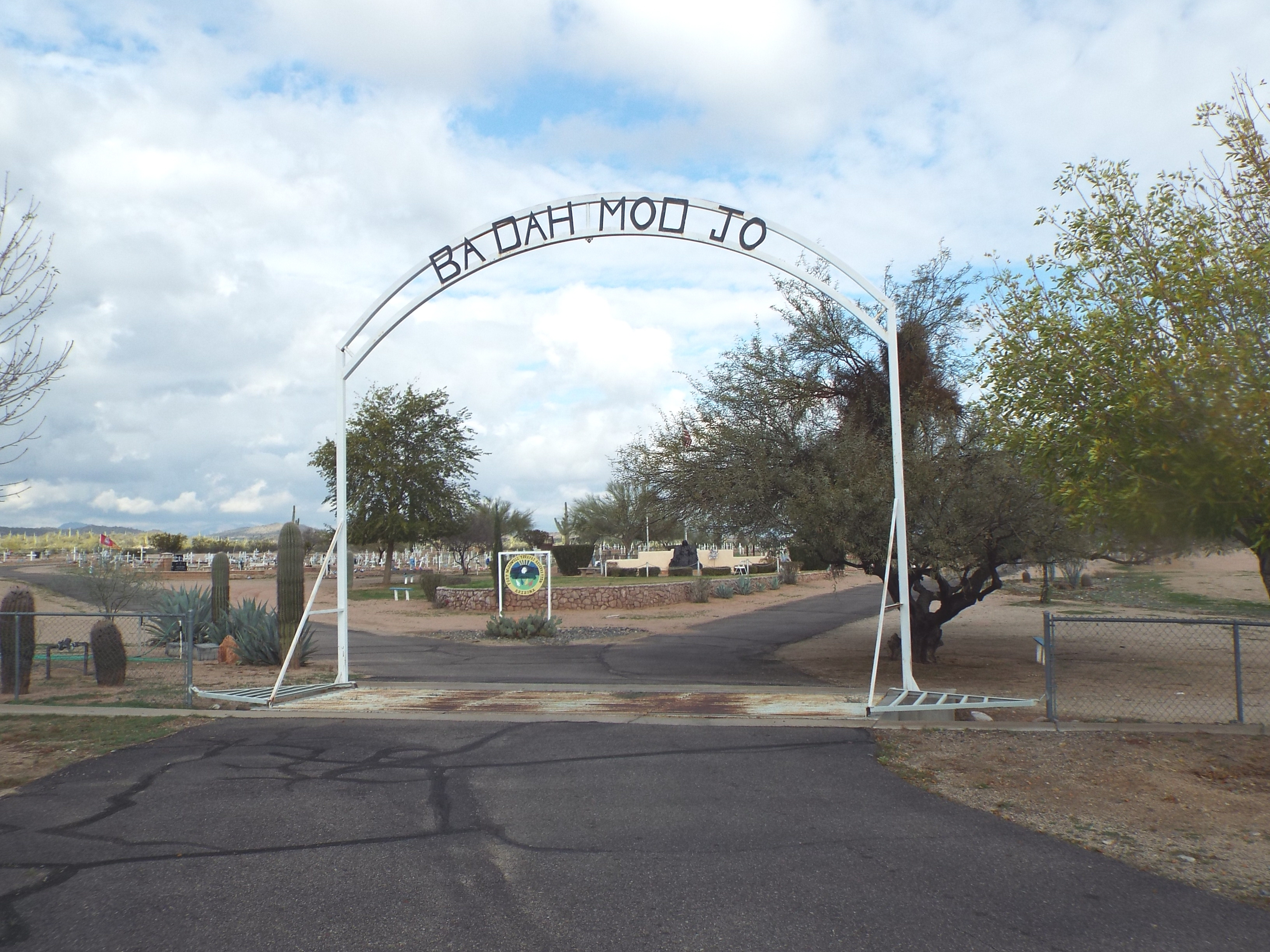
Entrance of the as "Ba Dah Mod Jo" Cemetery also known as the Fort McDowell Yavapai Nation Cemetery.

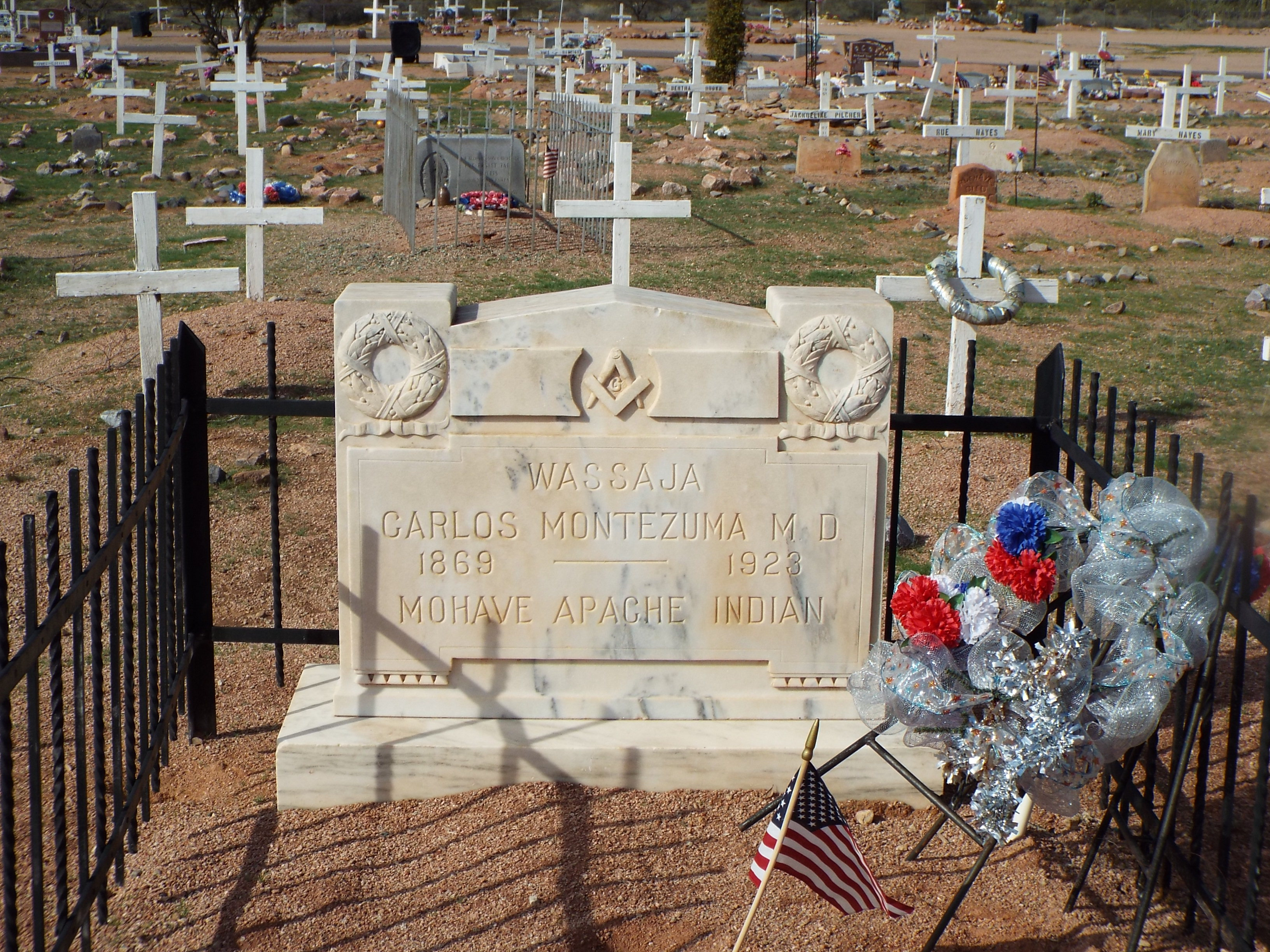
The grave of Carlos Montezuma or Wassaja in "Ba Dah Mod Jo" Cemetery.

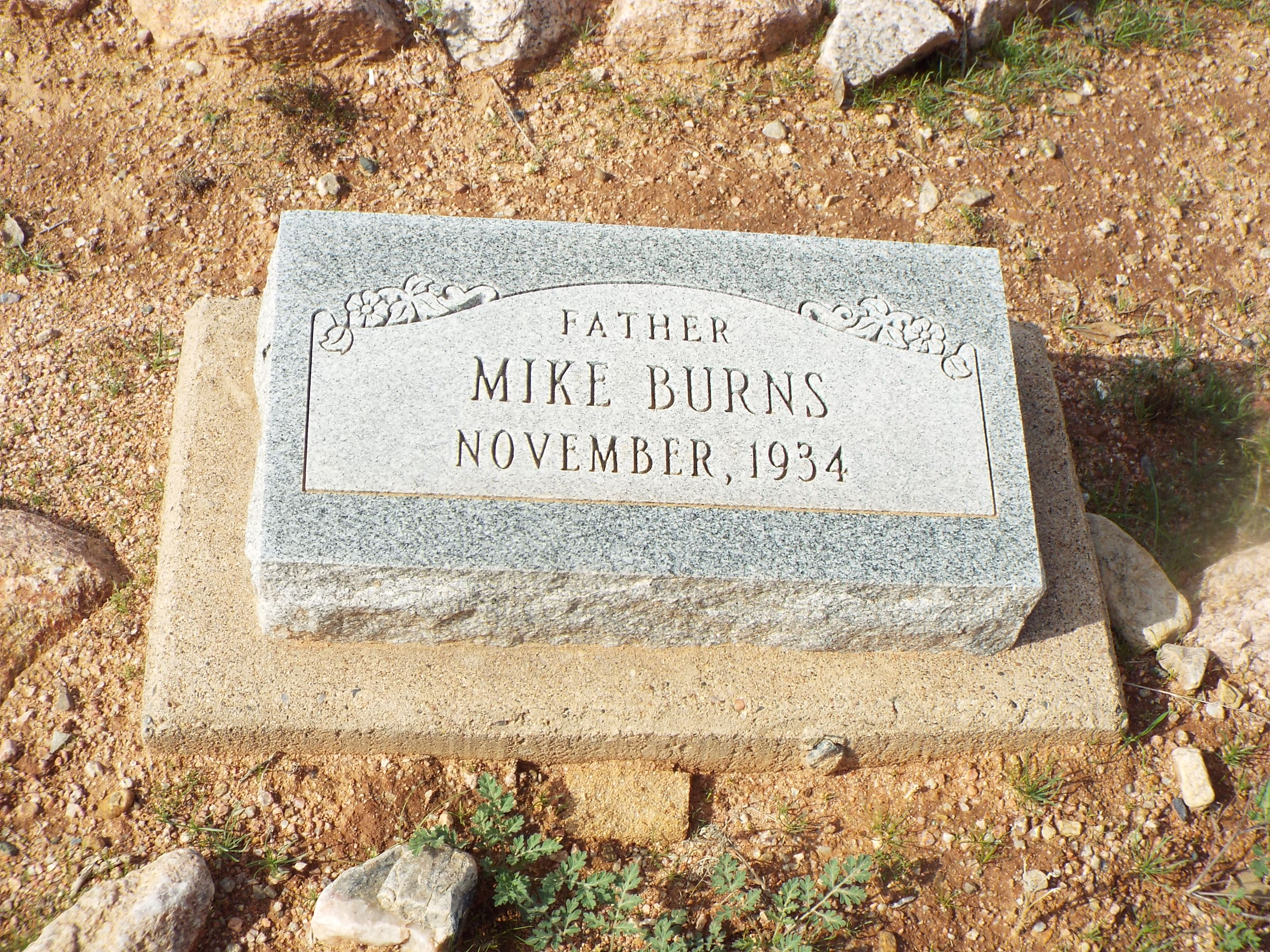
The grave of Mike Burns, whose real name was Hoo-moo-thy-ah. He was the cousin of Carlos Montezuma. When he was a child he led the US Cavalry to Skeleton Cave where he witnessed the massacre of his people.

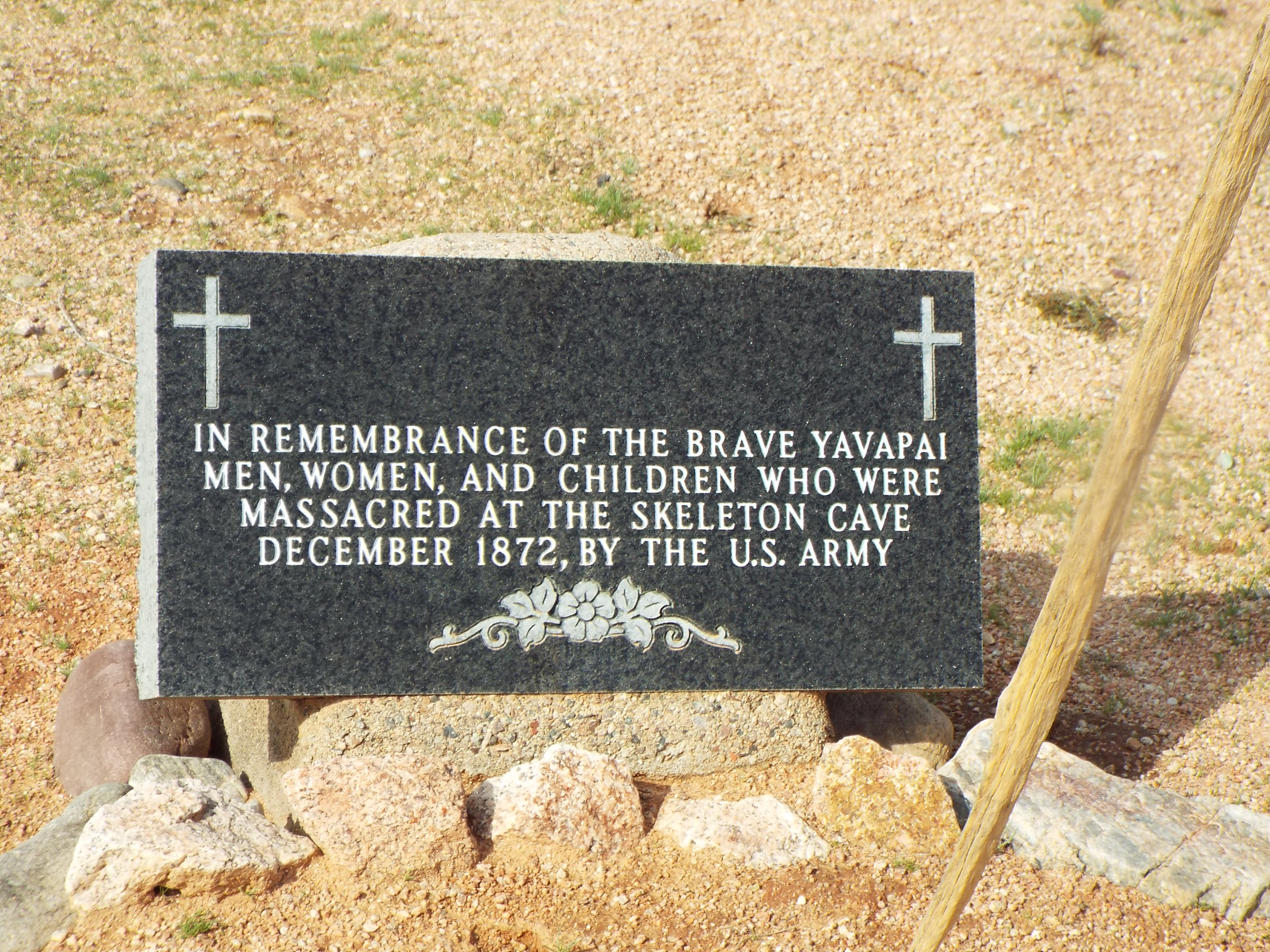
Grave dedicated to the men, women and children who were massacred by the soldiers of the US Army in Skeleton Cave.

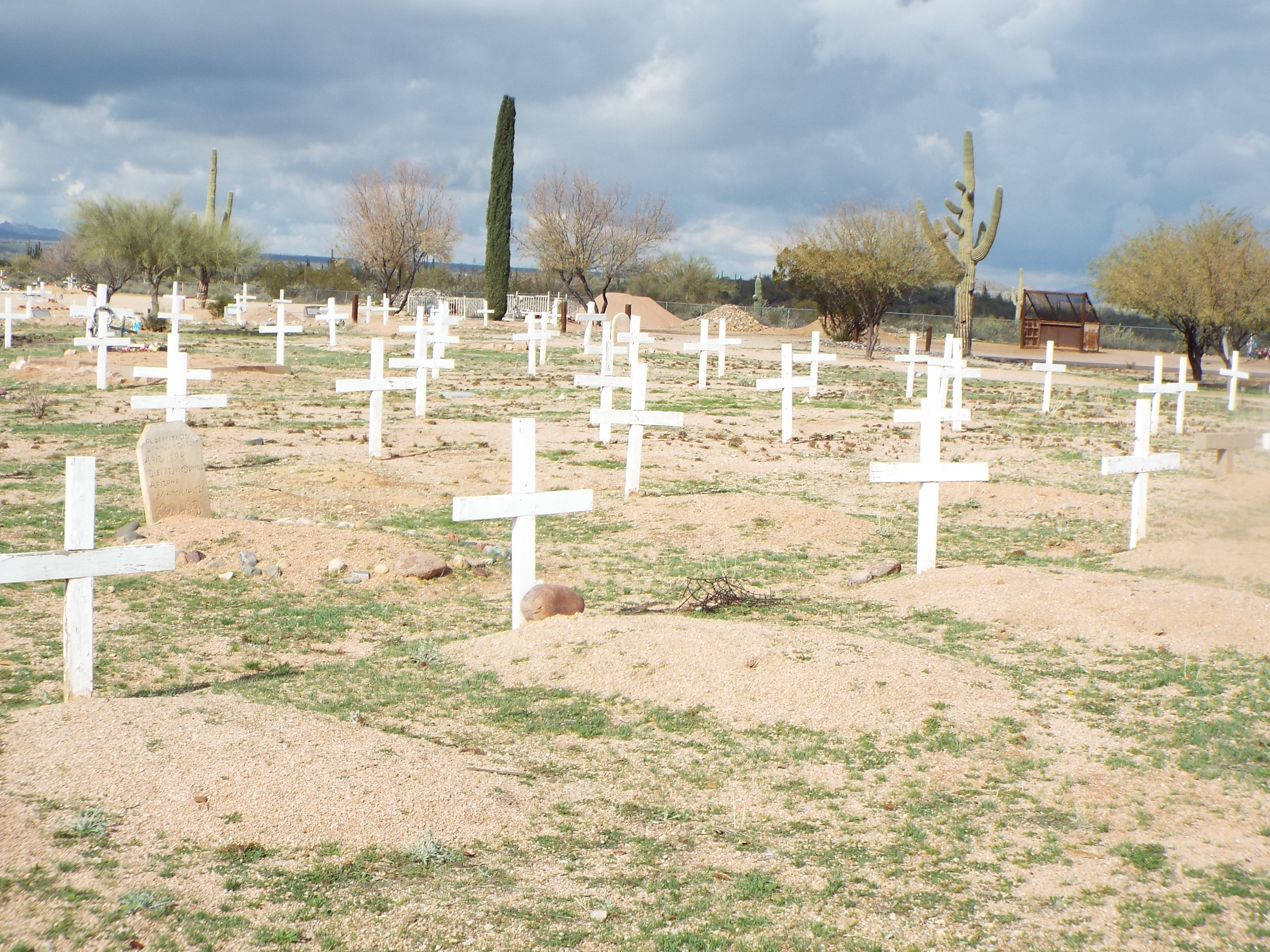
Unidentified graves of the Yavapai who perished during the “Indian Wars”.
