= Yavapai language =

Yuman language spoken in Arizona, US

Yavapai
- Native to: United States
- Region: Arizona
- Ethnicity: 1,420 Yavapai people (2004)
- Native speakers: 245 (2015 census)
- Language family: Yuman: Core Yuman; Pai; Yavapai
- Dialects: Kwevkepaya; Tolkepaya; Wipukepa; Yavepe

Language codes
- ISO 639-3: yuf Havasupai‑Walapai‑Yavapai
- Glottolog: hava1248 Havasupai‑Walapai‑Yavapai yava1252 Yavapai

Yavapai is an Upland Yuman language, spoken by Yavapai people in central and western Arizona. There are four dialects: Kwevkepaya, Wipukpaya, Tolkepaya, and Yavepe. Linguistic studies of the Kwevkepaya (Southern), Tolkepaya (Western), Wipukepa (Verde Valley), and Yavepe (Prescott) dialects have been published.

== Geographic distribution ==
Yavapai was once spoken across much of north-central and western Arizona, but is now mostly spoken on the Yavapai reservations at Fort McDowell, the Verde Valley and Prescott.

The rate of mutual comprehension between Yavapai and Havasupai–Hualapai is similar to that between Mohave and Maricopa.

Warren Gazzam, a Tolkapaya speaker, reported that "you know they (Hualapais) speak the same language as we do, some words or accents are a little different".

Due to extensive cultural interchange, many Yavapai were once bilingual in Apache, and some Apache were bilingual in Yavapai.

== Phonology ==
Yavapai consonant phonemes are shown below.

Consonants in Yavapai
		Bilabial	Dental	Alveolar	Palato- alveolar	Palatal	Velar		Uvular		Glottal	
		Bilabial	Dental	Alveolar	Palato- alveolar	Palatal	nor.	lab.	nor.	lab.	nor.	lab.
Plosive/ Affricate	plain	p	t		tʃ	kʲ	k	kʷ	q	qʷ	ʔ	
Plosive/ Affricate	aspirated	pʰ	tʰ		tʃʰ		kʰ	kʰʷ				
Fricative		β	θ	s	(ʃ)						h	hʷ
Nasal		m	n			ɲ						
Trill				r								
Lateral			l			(ʎ)						
Semivowel						j		w				

Vowels occur short, mid and long in stressed syllables. The contrast is reduced to two lengths in unstressed syllables.

	Front	Central	Back
Close	i iˑ iː		u uˑ uː
Mid	e eˑ eː		o oˑ oː
Open	(æ)	a aˑ aː	

There are two tones on stressed syllables, high level and falling, which are neutralized to mid on unstressed syllables.

Unlike in Havasupai and Hualapai, postaspirated stops cannot appear in word-initial position.

== Syntax ==
Yavapai is a subject-verb-object language.

== Examples ==
Some sample words given in Yavapai translation:

English	Yavapai	
English	Transliteration	IPA transcription
Hello	Mham jik'gah	
Home	Wah yoh woh	
Land	Mat	
Rivers	Aha gah hel’lah	
Fire	Oo	/oʔo/
Grand Canyon	Mahđ K'illa or Wika'ilaha	
Thank you	Honnii guhm	

== Preservation efforts ==
There have been recordings of Yavapai (as well as other Yuman languages) done in 1974, relating to phonology, syntax, and grammar. This was meant to understand the three topics better and to hear them.

There is an effort to revitalize the language. There is a Yavapai language program for adults to learn the language and pass on to future generations.

There have been attempts to save the language in the Yavapai community.

Poetry and stories have been published in Yavapai on several occasions. Yavapai poems are featured in Gigyayk Vo'jka, the anthology of poetry in Yuman languages edited by Hualapai linguist Lucille Watahomigie. Yavapai stories also appear in Spirit Mountain: An Anthology of Yuman Story and Song. Both works are accompanied by English translations, and the poems in Gigyayk Vo'jka also feature a morphological analysis.

Alan Shaterian has published a dictionary of Northeastern Yavapai. Pamela Munro is working on a dictionary and grammar for Tolkepaya.
