= Yavapai Wars =

Part of the Apache Wars

- Part of the Apache Wars
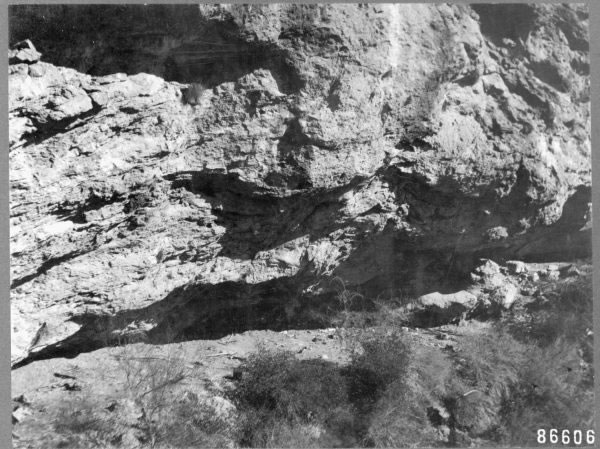
- Skeleton Cave
Date	1861–1875
Location	Arizona Territory
Result	United States victory

Belligerents
United States	Yavapai: (Note: Yavapai sub groups: Tolkapaya; Yavapé; Kwevkapaya; Wipukpa); Yavapai Allies: (Note: Yavapai allies; Apache; Yuma; Mohave)

Commanders and leaders
Pauline Weaver; George Crook; Charles King	Delshay; Nanni-chaddi †

Casualties and losses
	741 to 1,075 killed directly, Yavapai population declined by 4,000 to over 5,500 overall from various causes (Note: 366 to 489; possibly over 700 Yavapai where killed in massacres or battles, and 375 perished in Indian Removal deportations out of 1,400 remaining Yavapai. The Yavapai population was reduced from 6,000 to less than 2,000 possibly less than 500)

The Yavapai Wars, or the Tonto Wars, were a series of armed conflicts between the Yavapai and Tonto tribes against the United States in the Arizona Territory. The period began no later than 1861, with the arrival of American settlers on Yavapai and Tonto land. At the time, the Yavapai were considered a band of the Western Apache people due to their close relationship with tribes such as the Tonto and Pinal. The war culminated with the Yavapai's removal from the Camp Verde Reservation to San Carlos on February 27, 1875, an event now known as Exodus Day.

== Settler–Yavapai conflict ==
With the Mohave people's power greatly diminished, Tolkepaya saw that they needed to make new alliances to protect their safety. In April 1863, Quashackama, a well-known Tolkepaya, met with Arizona Territory superintendent of Indian affairs Charles Poston, along with representatives of the Pimas, Mohaves, Maricopas and Chemehuevis, at Fort Yuma, to sign an agreement intended "to promote the commerce in safety between the before mentioned tribes and the Americans." However, the agreement was not an official treaty, so therefore not legally binding in any way.

Despite this, the growing numbers of settlers (very quickly outnumbering Yavapai) began to call for the government to do something about the people occupying the land that they wanted to occupy and exploit themselves. The editor of a local newspaper, the Arizona Miner, said "Extermination is our only hope, and the sooner it is accomplished the better."

Early in January 1864, the Yavapai raided a number of ranches that supplied cattle to the miners in the Prescott and Agua Fria area. As a result of this and a series of recent killings, a preemptive attack was organized to discourage future depredations. Therefore, a group of well-armed volunteers were quickly outfitted with King S. Woolsey as their leader. Their mission was to track the raiding party back to their rancheria. What followed was an infamous footnote in Arizona history known today as the Bloody Tanks incident.

According to Braatz, "In December 1864, soldiers from Fort Whipple attacked two nearby Yavapé camps, killing 14 and wounding seven." The following month, Fort Whipple soldiers attacked another group of Yavapé, this time killing twenty-eight people, including their headman, Hoseckrua. Included in the group were employees of Prescott's US Indian agent John Dunn.

== Reservation wars ==
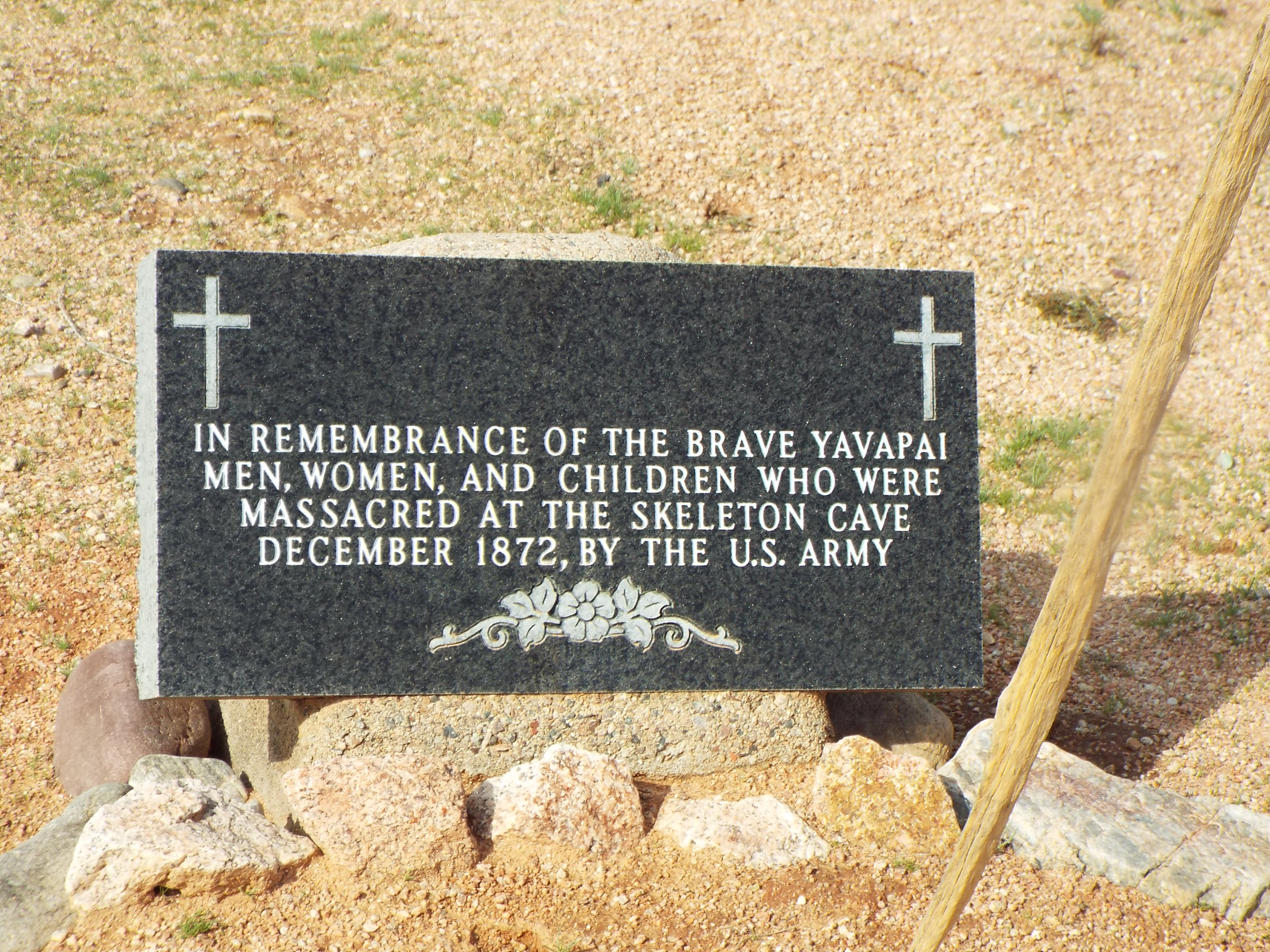
Grave in the Ba Dah Mod Jo Cemetery, also referred to as the Fort McDowell Yavapai Nation Cemetery

In 1864, Arizona Territory Governor John Goodwin advised the territorial legislature that all tribes be subdued and sent to reservations. The same year, a dispatch from the US Army stated "All Apache [Yavapai were routinely lumped in with their neighboring Apache] Indians in that territory are hostile, and all Apache men large enough to bear arms who may be encountered in Arizona will be slain whenever met, unless they give themselves up as prisoners."

Not long after, in retaliation for the murder of a Pai headman by Americans, a group of Pai attacked some wagon trains, and closed the road between Prescott and Fort Mohave to all traffic. In response, the US Army declared all Indians in lands beyond 75 miles (121 km) east of the Colorado River (the great majority of traditional Yavapai territory) to be "hostile" and "subject to extermination".

On November 5, 1871, the ambush of the Wickenburg stage – the Wickenburg massacre in which a driver and five of seven passengers killed – led to the relocation of the Yavapai from Prescott to San Carlos Reservation in February 1875.

=== Yavapai War ===
Yavapai War
- Part of the Yavapai Wars, Apache Wars
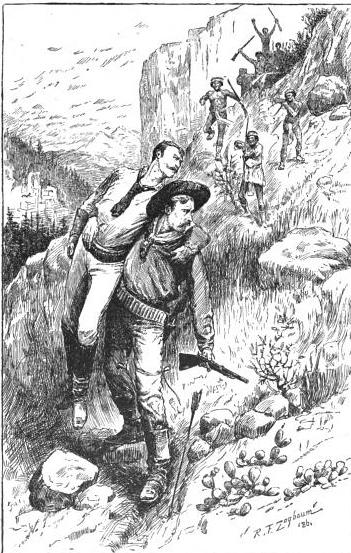
- The rescue of Lieutenant Charles King by Sergeant Bernard Taylor during the battle at Sunset Pass in 1874.
Date	1871–1875
Location	Arizona
Result	United States victory

Belligerents
United States	Yavapai; Apache

Commanders and leaders
George Crook; Charles King	Delshay; Nanni-chaddi †

The Yavapai War, was an armed conflict in the United States from 1871 to 1875 against Yavapai and Western Apache bands of Arizona. It began in the aftermath of the Camp Grant Massacre, on April 28, 1871, in which nearly 150 Pinal and Aravaipa Apaches were massacred by O'odham warriors, Mexican settlers, and American settlers. Some of the survivors fled north into the Tonto Basin to seek protection by their Yavapai and Tonto allies. From there followed a series of United States Army campaigns, under the direction of General George Crook, to return the natives to the reservation system. The conflict should not be confused with the Chiricahua War, which was fought primarily between the Americans and the Chiricahua warriors of Cochise between 1860 and 1873.

In December 1872, Colonel George Crook used Apache scouts to find the cave near the Salt River Canyon that was being used by Guwevkabaya as a hideout from which to mount attacks on White settlers. On December 28, accompanied by 100 Pima scouts, Captain William Brown led 120 of Crook's men to a siege of the cave. 110 Kwevkepaya were trapped in the cave, when Brown ordered the soldiers to fire at the roof of the cave, causing rock fragments and lead shrapnel to rain down on the Guwevkabaya. Having nowhere else to go, the besieged gathered around the mouth of the cave, where soldiers (accompanied by Crook) pushed boulders onto them from above, killing 76 of the group. The survivors were taken to Camp Grant as prisoners. The Yavapai were so demoralized by this and other actions by Crook that they surrendered at Camp Verde (renamed Fort McDowell), on April 6, 1873. This was the start of the Tonto Basin Campaign.

In 1925, a group of Yavapai from the Fort McDowell Reservation, along with a Maricopa County Sheriff, collected the bones from the cave, by then named Skeleton Cave, and interred them at the Fort McDowell cemetery.

== Exodus Day ==
In 1886, many Yavapai joined in campaigns by the US Army, as scouts, against Geronimo and other Chiricahua Apache. The wars ended with the Yavapai's and the Tonto's removal from the Camp Verde Reservation to San Carlos on February 27, 1875, now known as Exodus Day. 1,400 were relocated in these travels and over the course the relocation the Yavapai received no wagons or rest stops. Yavapai were beaten with whips through rivers of melted snow in which many drowned, any Yavapai who lagged behind was left behind or shot. The march lead to 375 deaths.

== See also ==
- Apache Wars
- Battle of Pima Butte

== Sources ==
- Braatz, Timothy (2003). Surviving Conquest. University of Nebraska Press. ISBN 978-0-8032-2242-7.
- Campbell, Julie A. (1998). Studies in Arizona History. Tucson, Arizona: Arizona Historical Society. ISBN 0910037388
- Coffer, William E. (1982). Sipapu, the Story of the Indians of Arizona and New Mexico, Van Nostrand Reinhold, ISBN 0-442-21590-8.
- Fenn, Al, "The Story of Mickey Burns", Sun Valley Spur Shopper, September 30, 1971
- Fish, Paul R. and Fish, Suzanne K. (1977). Verde Valley Archaeology: Review & Prospective, Flagstaff: Museum of Northern Arizona, Anthropology research report #8
- Gifford, Edward (1936). Northeastern and Western Yavapai. Berkeley, California: University of California Press.
- Hoxie, Frederick E. (1996). Encyclopedia of North American Indians, Houghton Mifflin Books, ISBN 0-395-66921-9.
- Jones, Terry L. and Klar, Kathryn A. (2007). California Prehistory: Colonization, Culture, and Complexity, Rowman Altamira, ISBN 0-7591-0872-2.
- Kendall, Martha B. (1976). Selected Problems in Yavapai Syntax. New York: Garland Publishing, Inc., ISBN 0-8240-1969-5.
- Nelson Espeland, Wendy (1998). The Struggle for Water: Politics, Rationality, and Identity in the American Southwest, University of Chicago Press. ISBN 0-226-21793-0
- Pritzker, Harry (2000). A Native American Encyclopedia: History, Culture, and Peoples, Oxford University Press, ISBN 0-19-513877-5.
- Ruland Thorne, Kate; Rodda, Jeanette; Smith, Nancy R. (2005). Experience Jerome: The Moguls, Miners, and Mistresses of Cleopatra Hill, Primer Publishers, ISBN 0-935810-77-3.
- Salzmann, Zdenek and Salzmann, Joy M. (1997). Native Americans of the Southwest: The Serious Traveler's Introduction to Peoples and Places. Boulder, Colorado: Westview Press. ISBN 0-8133-2279-0
- Swanton, John Reed (1952). The Indian Tribes of North America, US Government Printing Office.
- University of California, Berkeley (1943). University of California Publications in Linguistics, University of California Press.
- Utley, Robert Marshall (1981). Frontiersmen in Blue: The United States Army and the Indian, 1848–1865, University of Nebraska Press, ISBN 0-8032-9550-2.
- Big Dry Wash Battlfield, Arizona at NPS
- Fort McDowell Yavapai Nation, history and culture
- Yavapai–Apache Nation, official site
- Yavapai Prescott Indian Tribe, official site
