= Bernard Taylor =

Bernard Taylor may refer to:

- Bernard Taylor (author) (1934–2025), British horror and suspense author
- Bernard Taylor, Baron Taylor of Mansfield (1895–1991), British coalminer and politician
- Bernard Taylor (boxer) (born 1957), American boxer
- Bernard Taylor (soldier) (1844–1875), American soldier
- Bernard J. Taylor, South African writer and composer of stage musicals
