= Battle of Sunset Pass =

Part of the Yavapai War (1874)

Coordinates: 34°51′10″N 110°55′28″W

- Part of the Yavapai War, Apache Wars
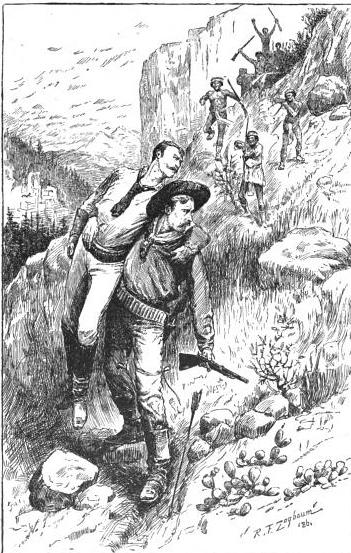
- The rescue of Charles King by Sergeant Bernard Taylor at Sunset Pass.
Date	November 1, 1874
Location	Sunset Pass, Coconino County, Arizona
Result	Apache victory

Belligerents
United States	Apache

Commanders and leaders
(United States) Charles King	Unknown

Strength
≈40	Unknown

The Battle of Sunset Pass was fought in November 1874 during the Yavapai War. Following the theft of livestock by a band of Tonto Apaches, a troop of United States Army soldiers was dispatched to track the natives and recover the stolen property. The Americans found the raiders at Sunset Pass, in Coconino County, Arizona, where a small skirmish ensued.

== Battle ==
In October 1874 a Tonto band stole some livestock from a settler in the Tonto Basin so on the morning of November 1, 1874 about forty men of the 5th Cavalry, including some Apache scouts, left Camp Verde to pursue the hostiles. The patrol reached Sunset Pass, near the Little Colorado River, that same day so the commander, First Lieutenant Charles King, decided that the spot would be a good place to make camp for the night. However, shortly after the Americans stopped, King took a few men with him on a hike up a nearby mesa in order to have a better view of the surrounding terrain. Unbeknown to King, the Tontos he was looking for were waiting to ambush the party while they climbed up the mesa. King and his men were about a half a mile away from camp when suddenly a volley or arrows and bullets was fired from the Tontos hiding behind rocks and boulders. King was badly wounded within the first few minutes of the fight, having been hit in the head twice by arrows and one by a bullet to his right arm.

Under a heavy enemy fire, Sergeant Bernard Taylor raced forward and rescued King who was almost unconscious. Sergeant Taylor then carried the wounded King all the way back to camp. By which time the remainder of the patrol moved in to engage. Second Lieutenant George O. Eaton assumed command at that point and he fought the Apaches for some time before disengaging. In the end, King's probe was regarded as a failure though Sergeant Taylor, George Deary, and Rudolph von Medem later received the Medal of Honor for their conduct in this battle and other engagements.

== Aftermath ==
Because the pursuit of the Tonto Apaches failed, the garrison of Camp Verde launched another expedition on November 17 of 1874. In it, Second Lieutenant Eaton led a detachment of the 5th Cavalry which was accompanied by the famous frontiersman Al Sieber and his Apache scouts. The expedition first headed east from Camp Verde along West Clear Creek before heading roughly northeast above the Mogollon Rim. Several days later, on November 24, Eaton and his command encountered a patrol under Captain Robert H. Montgomery who had been patrolling farther to the east. Though Eaton had no orders to proceed further east, he continued on and found the Apache's trail which Captain Montgomery had missed. The expedition followed the trail and two hours before sunset they found the hostiles. Another skirmish ensued and it resulted in the deaths of two warriors and the capture of six women and children, the Americans suffered no casualties. As for First Lieutenant King, he later became a captain only to retire from the regular army shortly afterwards, due to his wounds sustained at Sunset Pass. King then became a well known novelist before volunteering to fight in the War of 1898 and the Philippine–American War as a general. One of King's works was the book Sunset Pass, published in 1890.
