= Skeleton Cave (Arizona) =

Cave in Arizona

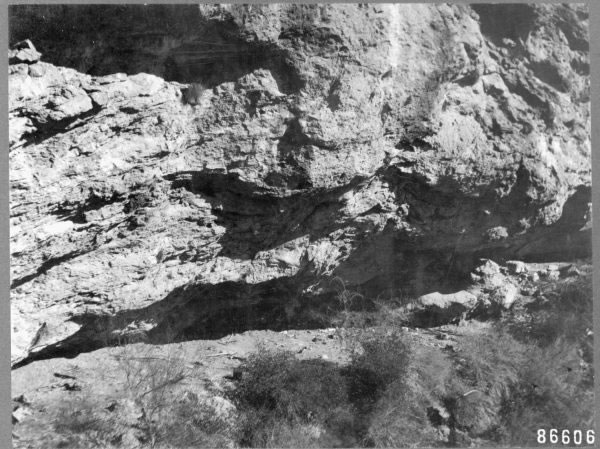
- Skeleton Cave located in Salt River Canyon
- Interactive map of Skeleton Cave
- Location: Salt River Canyon Wilderness
- Coordinates: 33°34′53″N 111°22′07″W
- Entrances: 1
- Skeleton Cave Massacre Site
- U.S. National Register of Historic Places
- Location within Arizona Location within the United States
- Nearest city: Apache Junction, Arizona
- Area: 2 acres (0.81 ha)
- Built: 1872
- Architectural style: Natural Cave
- NRHP reference No.: 91000100
- Added to NRHP: February 21, 1991

Skeleton Cave is a cave in Maricopa County, Arizona, United States. The cave is within the Salt River Canyon Wilderness and is located on the northern wall of the Salt River Canyon near the Horse Mesa Dam. It was the site of the 1872 massacre of the Yavapai people in the Skeleton Cave massacre.

It was listed on the National Register of Historic Places in 1991.

== Background ==
A short distance from Canyon Lake, Skeleton Cave, also known as Apache Cave and Skull Cave, is a rock shelter formed by the overhang in the cliff wall. The cave is no deeper than 40 feet (12 m), and is approximately 118 feet (36 m) wide. It sits 1,200 feet (370 m) above the river, at the base of a 170 feet (52 m) cliff.

The cave was used by the Yavapais as a hideout from George Crook and the 5th Cavalry. On December 28, 1872, Crook and his soldiers massacred the Yavapais. This was the first principal engagement during the 1872 Tonto Basin Campaign and part of the 1871 to 1875 Yavapai War. The 5th Cavalry left the more than seventy bodies of the victims in the cave. From the time of the 1872 massacre until about 1905, the cave remained forgotten.

In January 1908, local rancher Jack Adams visited the cave with a group of friends. The remains of the slain Yavapais were still in the cave along with remnants of their belongings, and this is how the cave acquired its name. After 1908, with the construction of local dams, the cave was rediscovered and subsequently looted. In 1933, the remains of the massacre victims were relocated to Fort McDowell. The survivors became the Fort McDowell Yavapai Nation.

The wilderness area around the cave is managed by the United States Forest Service. Accessing the cave requires a difficult hike.
