= Fort McDowell, Arizona =

Unincorporated community in the state of Arizona, United States

- Unincorporated community
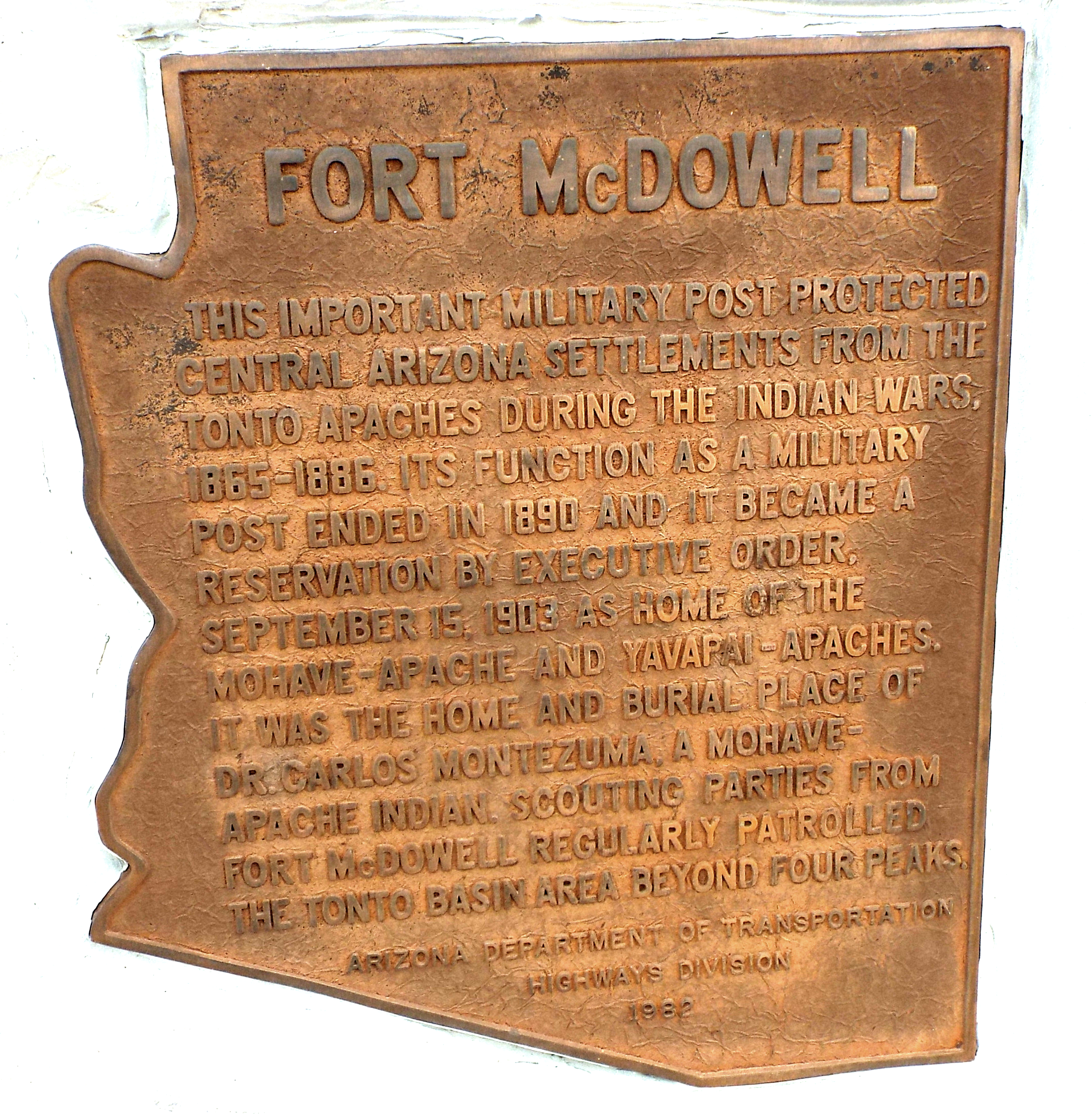
- Location where Fort McDowell once stood

- Location within Arizona Location within the United States
- Coordinates: 33°38′12″N 111°40′28″W
- Country: United States
- State: Arizona
- County: Maricopa
- Elevation: 1,440 ft (439 m)

Population
  - Total: 600
- Time zone: UTC-7 (Mountain (MST))
  - Summer (DST): UTC-7 (MST)
- ZIP code: 85264
- Area code: 480
- FIPS code: 04-24810
- GNIS feature ID: 29117

Fort McDowell is an unincorporated community in Maricopa County, Arizona, United States. Fort McDowell is 23 miles northeast of Phoenix. Fort McDowell has a post office with ZIP code 85264. It is part of the Fort McDowell Yavapai Reservation.

== History ==
The location was named Camp McDowell, and later renamed Fort McDowell in 1867 when established by the California Volunteers on the Verde River in 1865. It was named for Major General Irvin McDowell. The fort was located within Indian country and built to be near the area's travel routes in an effort to protect them from the Apache who lived in the Gila River and Salt River valleys. The post office opened as McDowell in 1869 and changed to Fort McDowell in 1923. Some Native Americans of the region chose to seek refuge in the surrounding mountains rather than conform to the constraints of reservation life. These displaced Indians often traveled in small groups to avoid detection. Their presence, however, caused fear and unrest for nervous settlers, and thus a military outpost (Camp Verde) was deemed necessary to protect trade routes within the region. In addition to the Salt and Verde rivers, Fort McDowell was in close proximity to a number of trails important to the Apache of central Arizona, and the installation conducted numerous military exercises against the Tonto Apache and others. Originally named Camp Verde, the fort was thought to be able to withstand an onslaught from these so-called 'renegades', but in fact, the structures failed to survive the heavy summer monsoon rains, washing away not long after being built. The Stoneman Military Trail served as a supply trail and connected Fort McDowell to Fort Whipple in Prescott, Arizona, during the years 1870–1890.

== Climate ==
According to the Köppen Climate Classification system, Fort McDowell has a semi-arid climate, abbreviated "BSk" on climate maps.

== Historic Fort McDowell ==
Fort McDowell Ruins
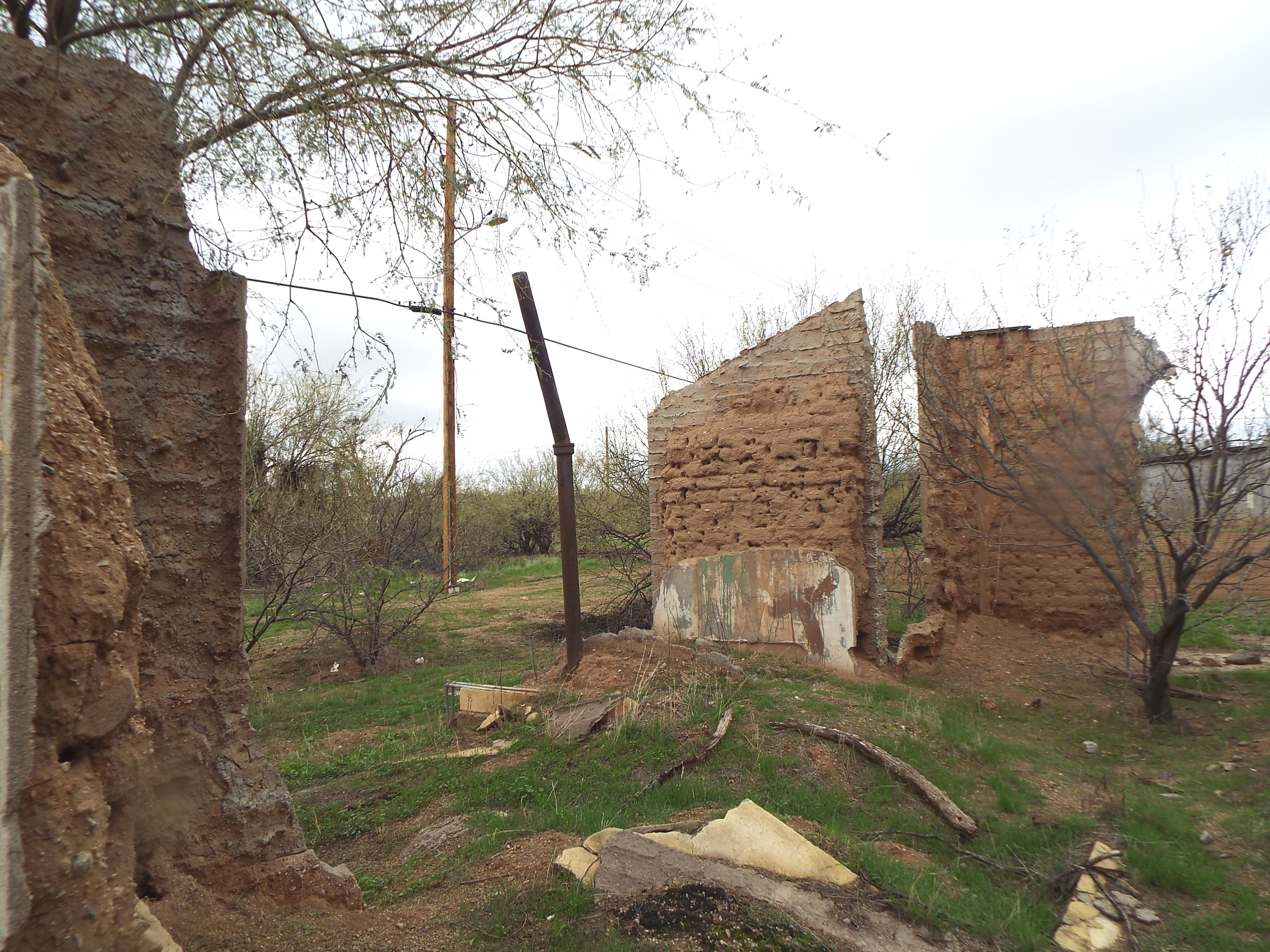
The remaining ruins of the Fort McDowell officers quarters located in Ba Hon Nah Road.

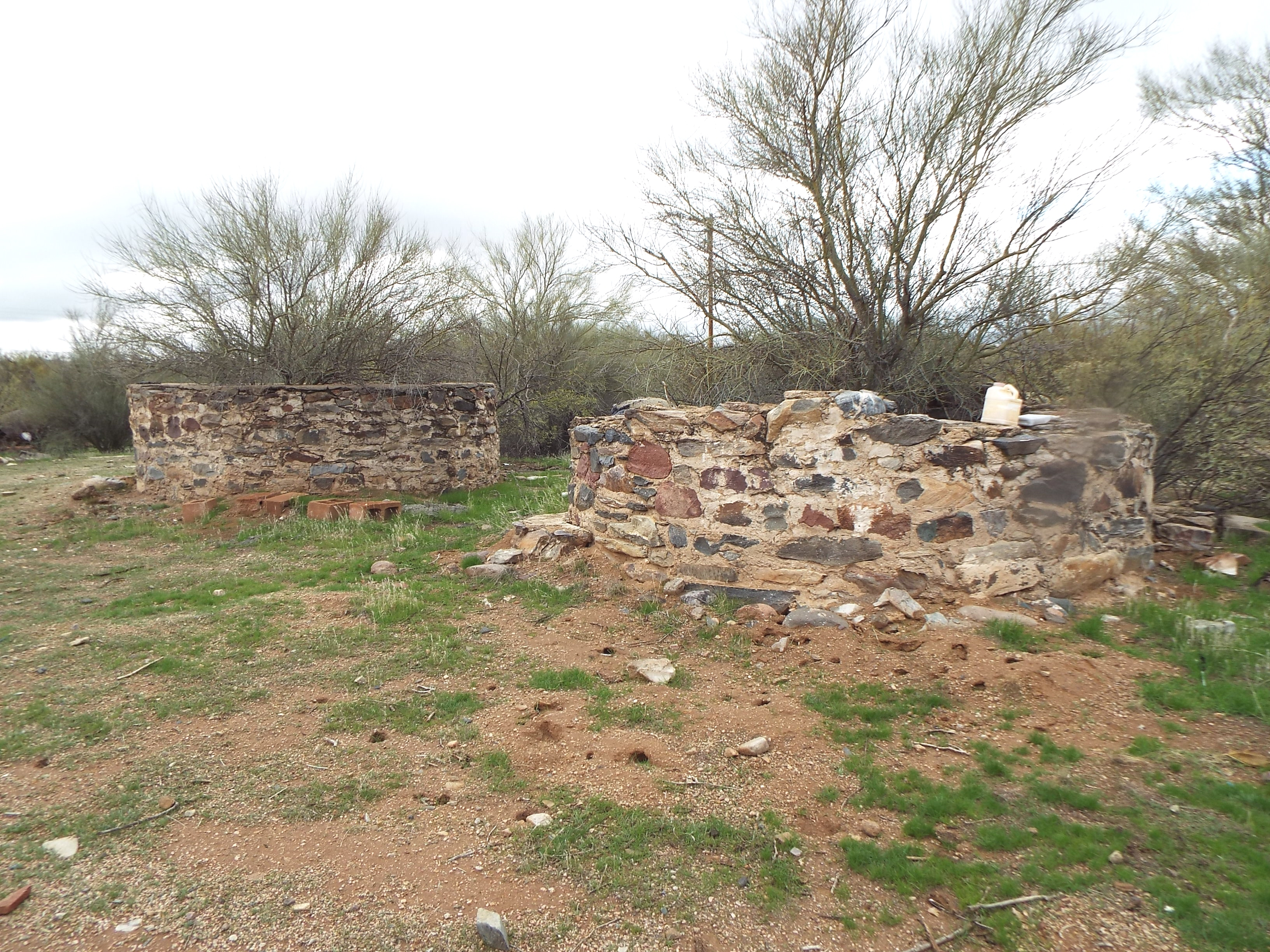
Fort McDowell ruins located in Fort Loop Road.

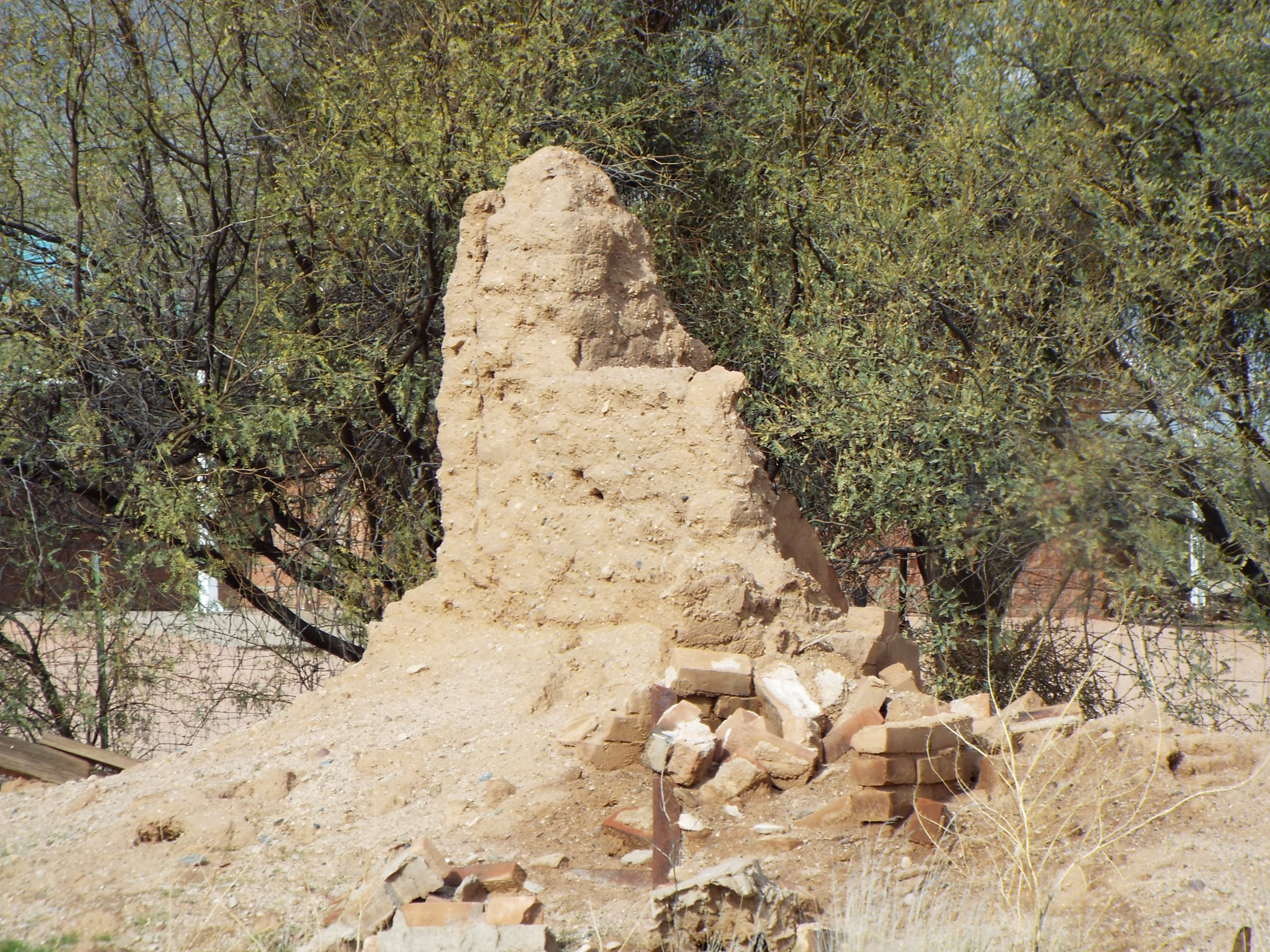
The ruins of one of the buildings which belonged to the original Fort McDowell.

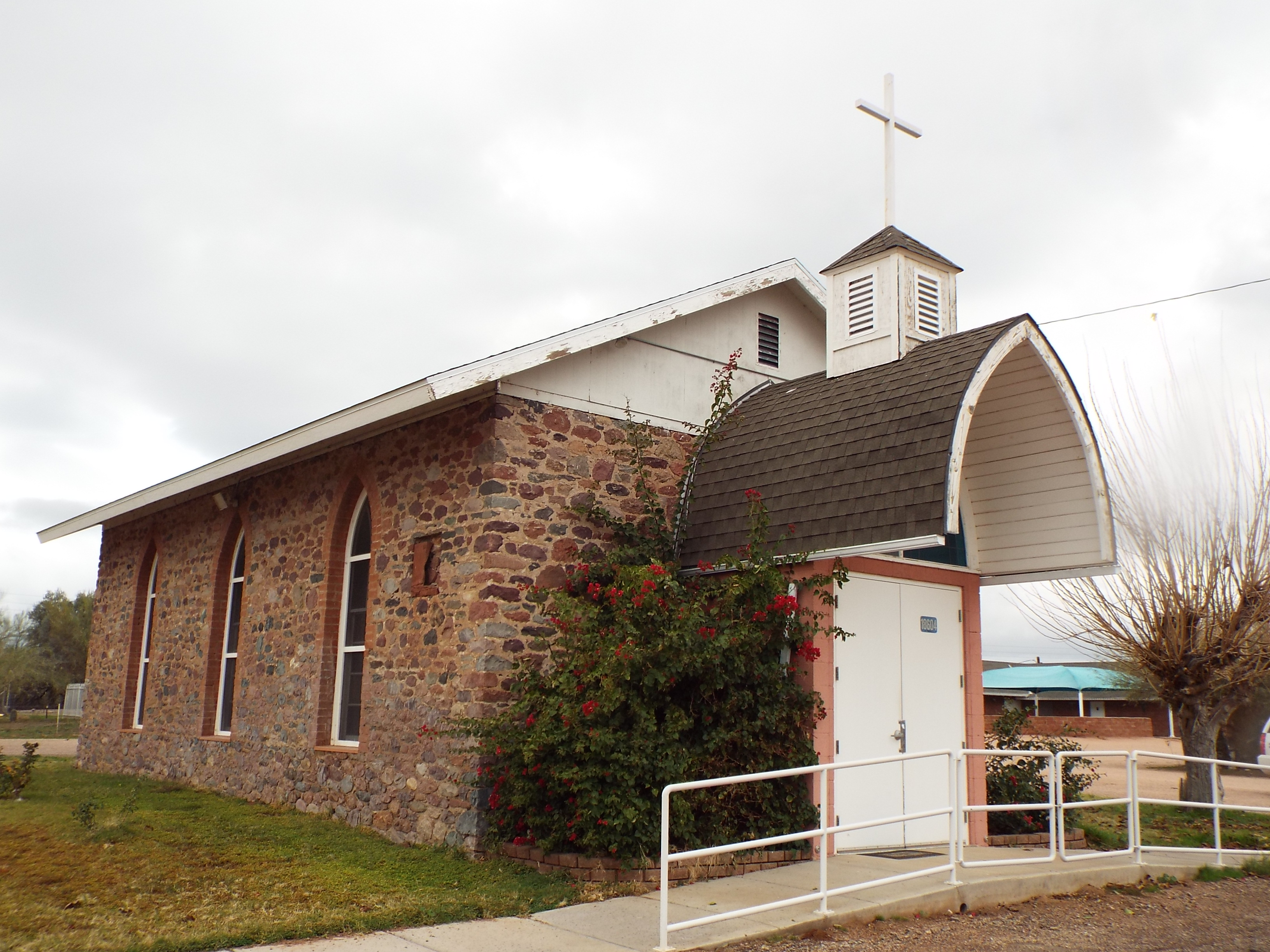
Fort McDowell Church located in Fort Loop Road.

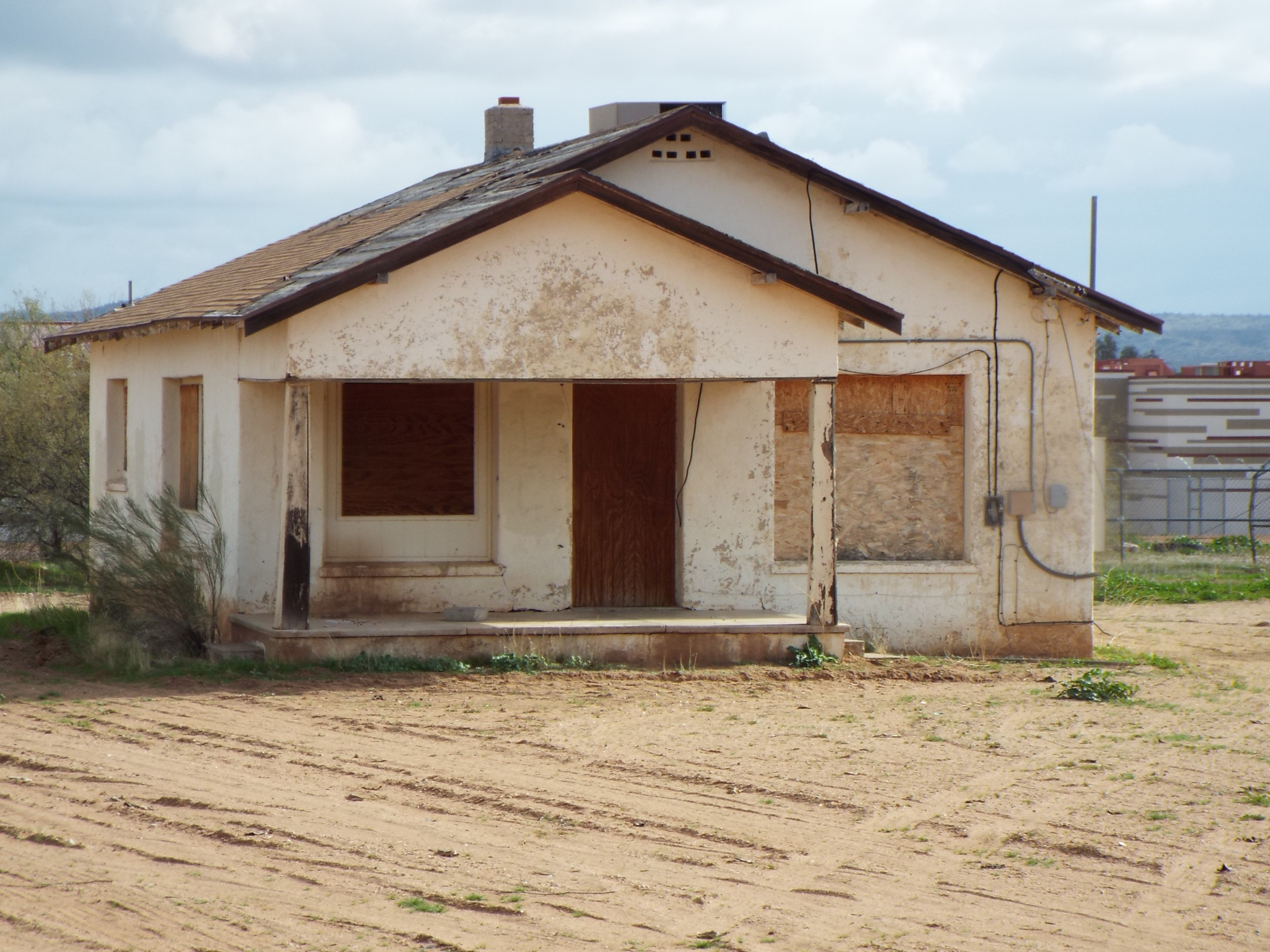
Abandoned house in the land of the Fort McDowell Yavapai Nation.

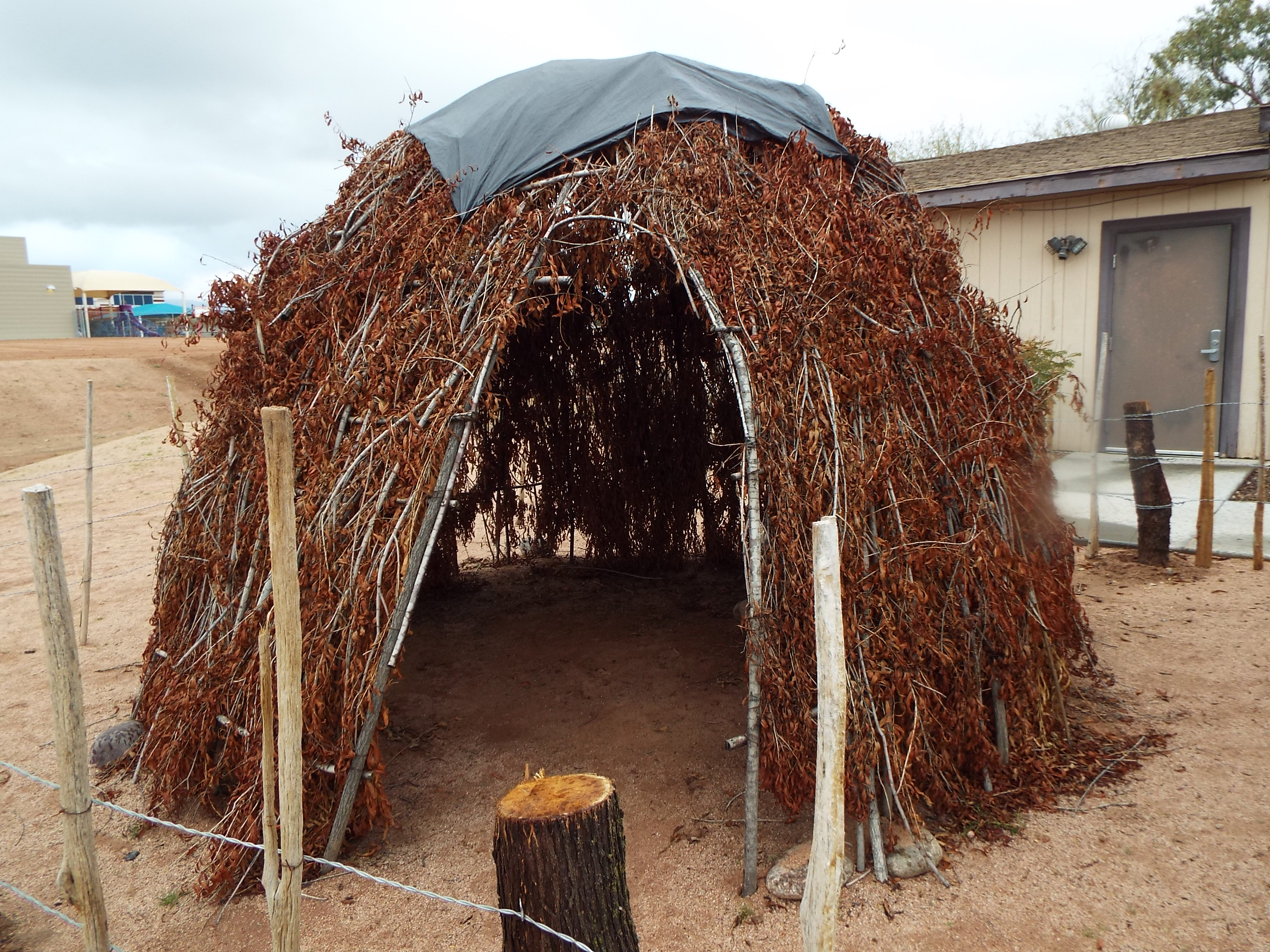
An early Wickiup or hut which served as a home of a Yavapai family.

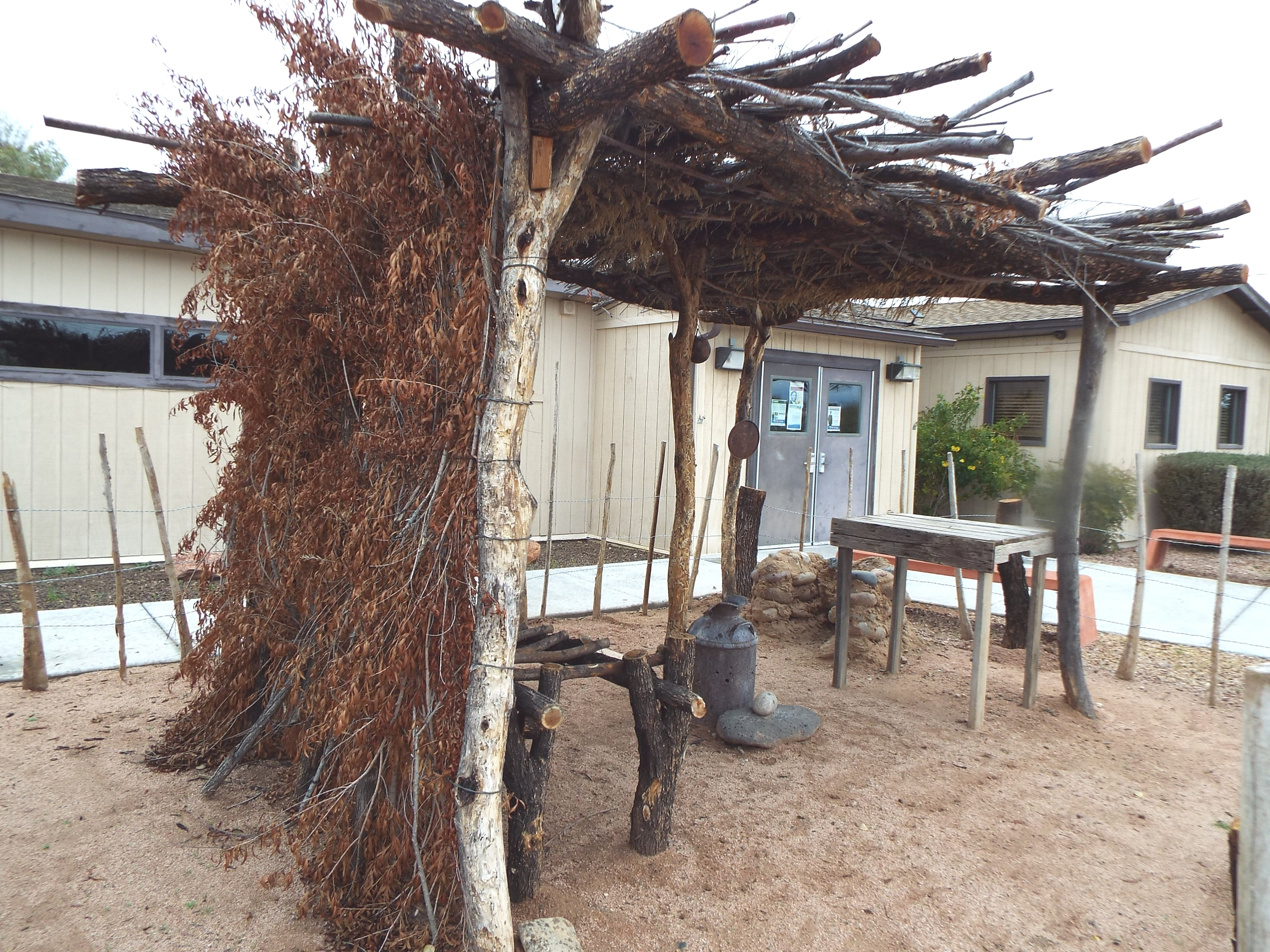
Yavapai resting area.

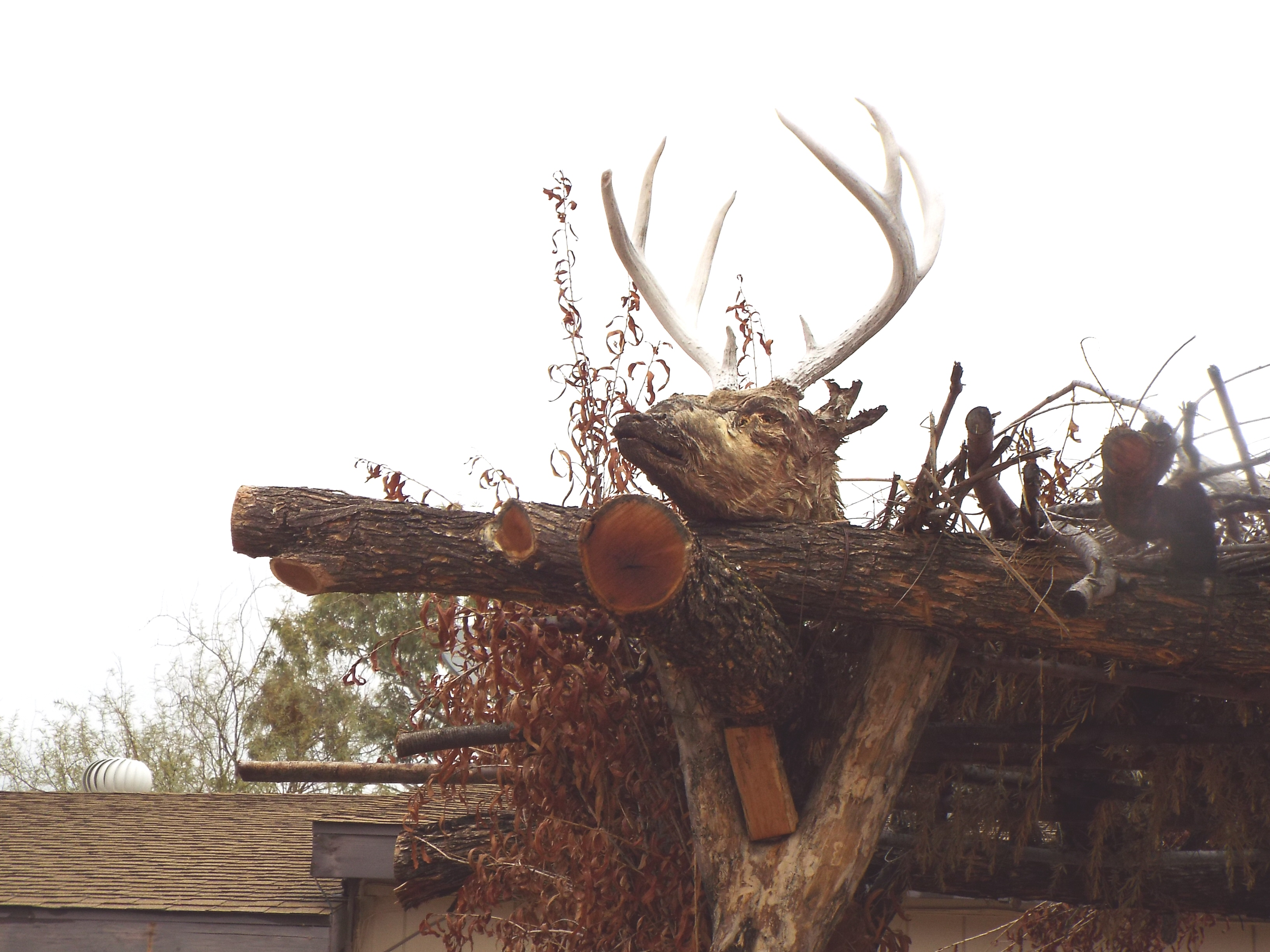
Deer Head on top of the Yavapai resting area.

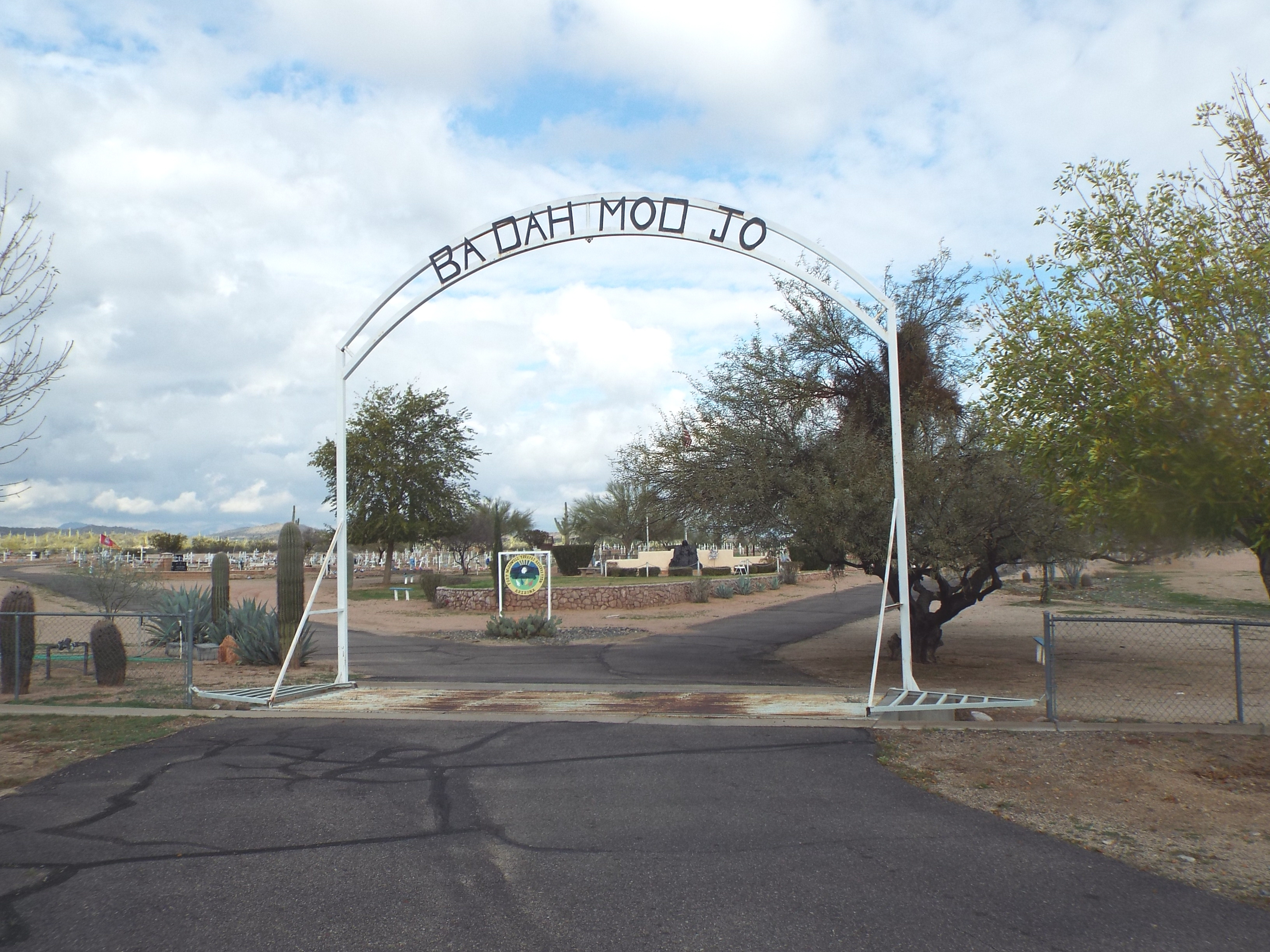
Entrance of the as "Ba Dah Mod Jo" Cemetery also known as the Fort McDowell Yavapai Nation Cemetery.

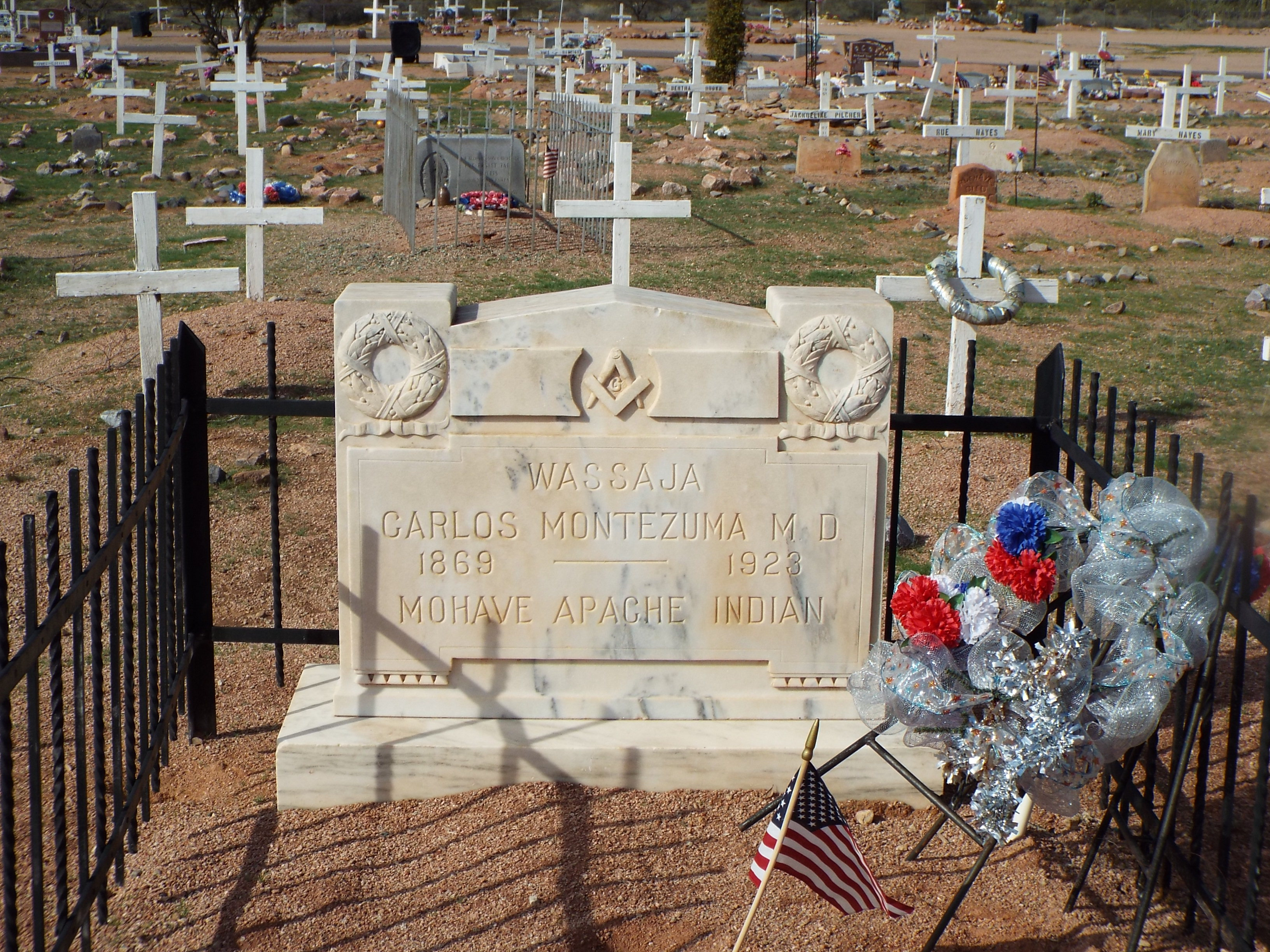
The grave of Carlos Montezuma or Wassaja in "Ba Dah Mod Jo" Cemetery. Montezuma was a Yavapai-Apache Native American, activist and a founding member of the Society of American Indians. His birth name Wassaja, means "Signaling" or "Beckoning" in his native tongue. He was the first Native American male to receive a medical degree.

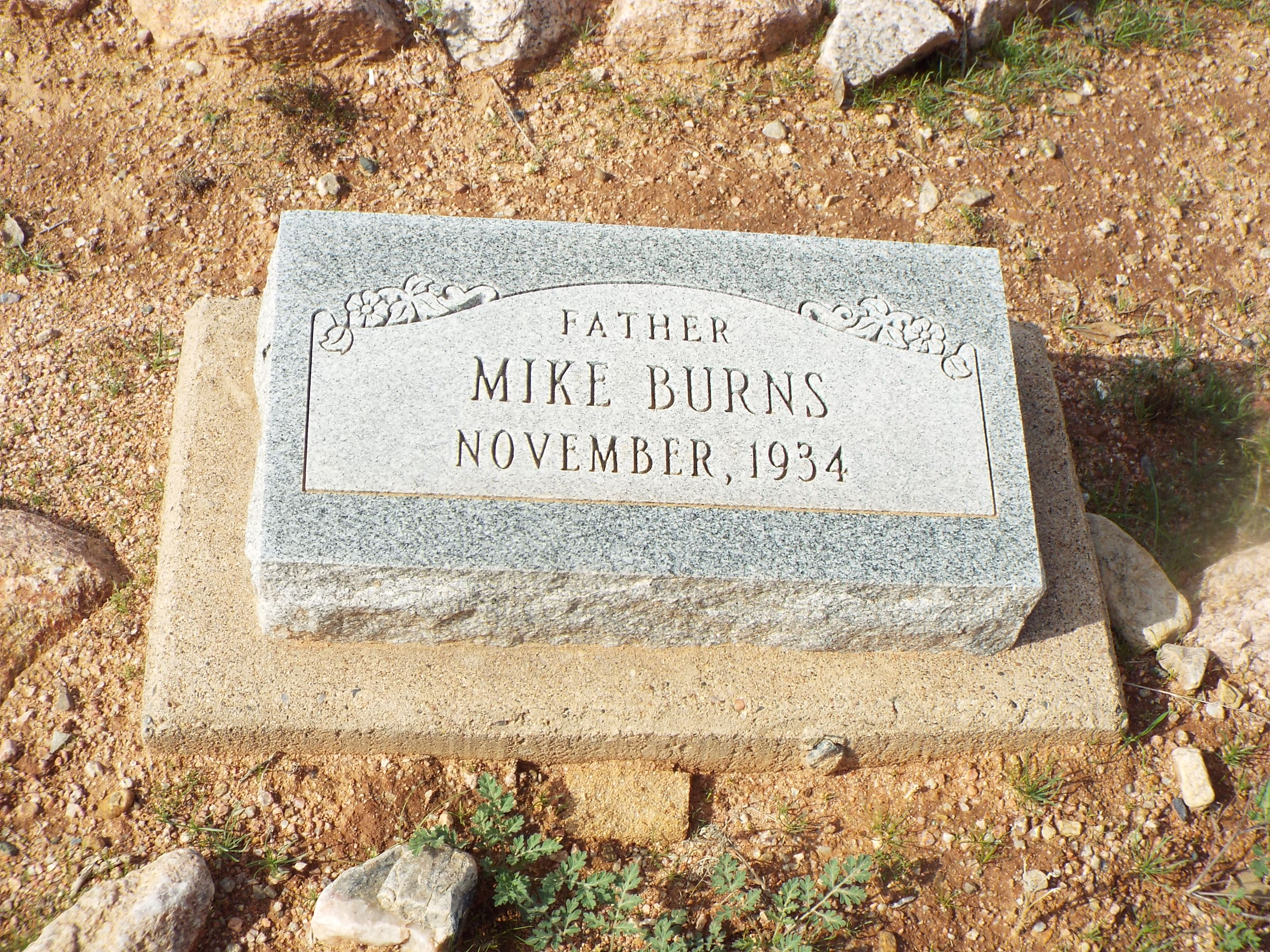
The grave of Mike Burns, whose real name was Hoo-moo-thy-ah. He was the cousin of Carlos Montezuma. When he was a child he led the US Cavalry to Skeleton Cave where he witnessed the massacre of his people.

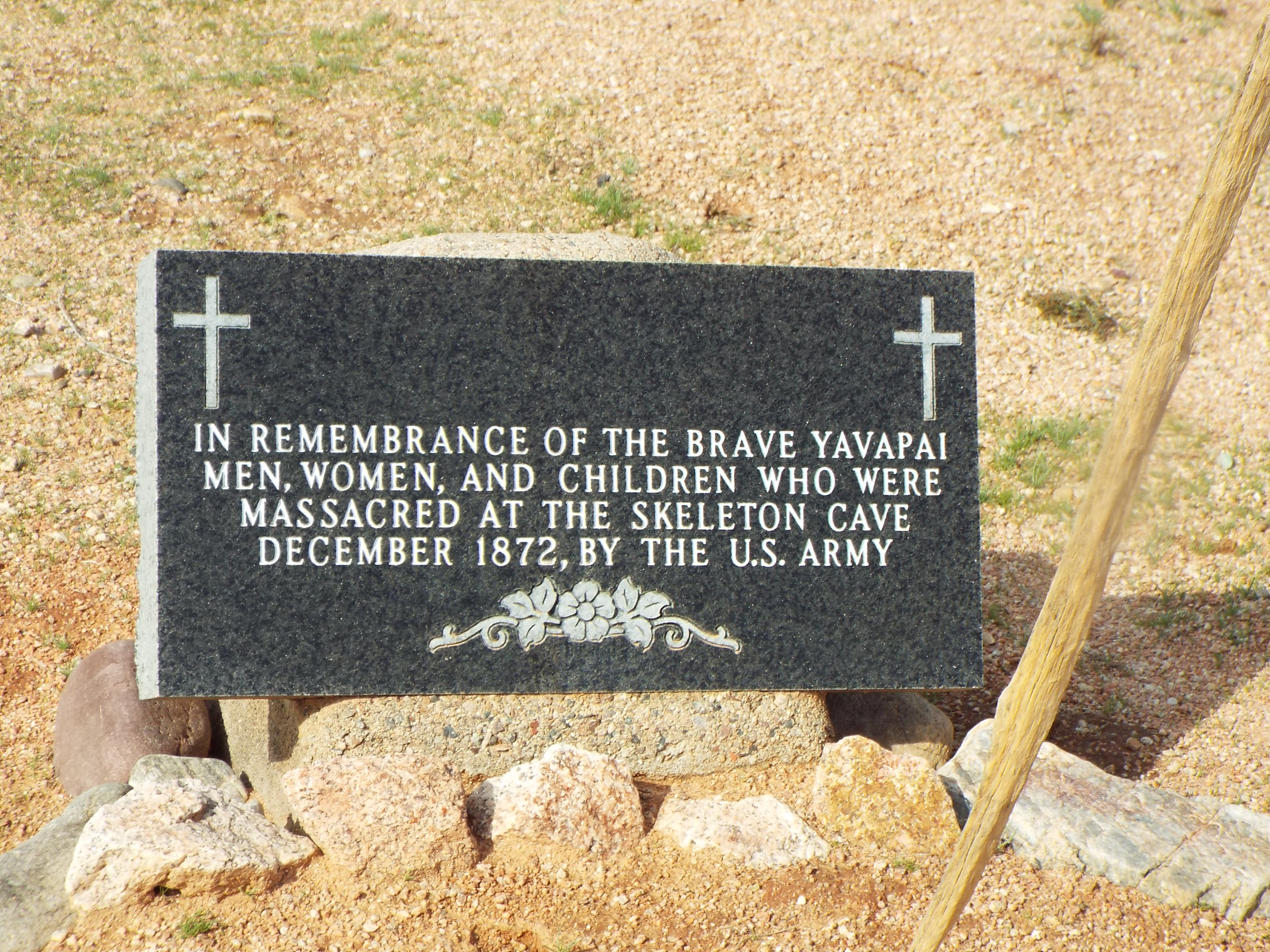
Grave dedicated to the men, women and children who were massacred by the soldiers of the US Army in Skeleton Cave.

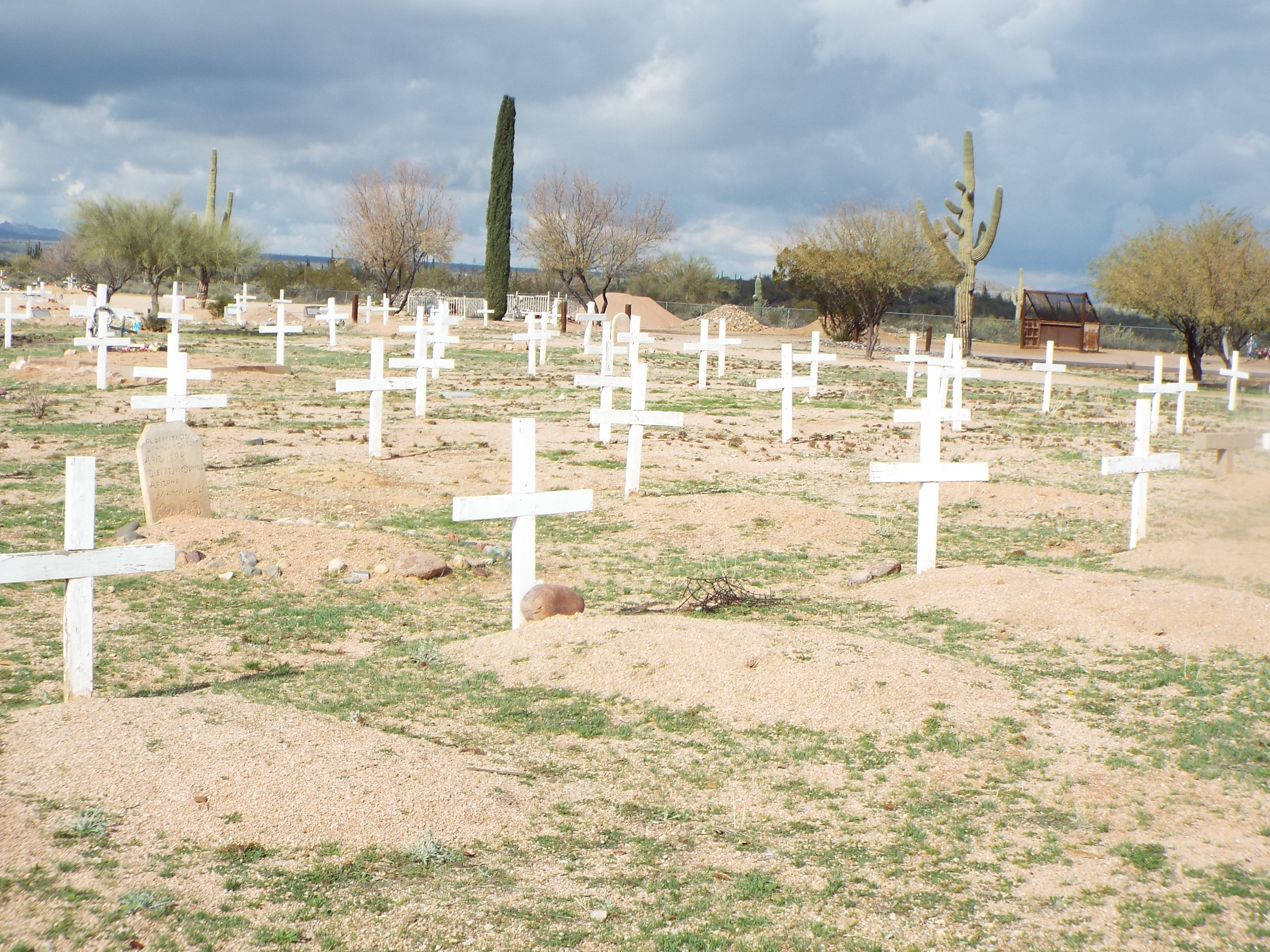
Unidentified graves of the Yavapai who perished during the "Indian Wars”.

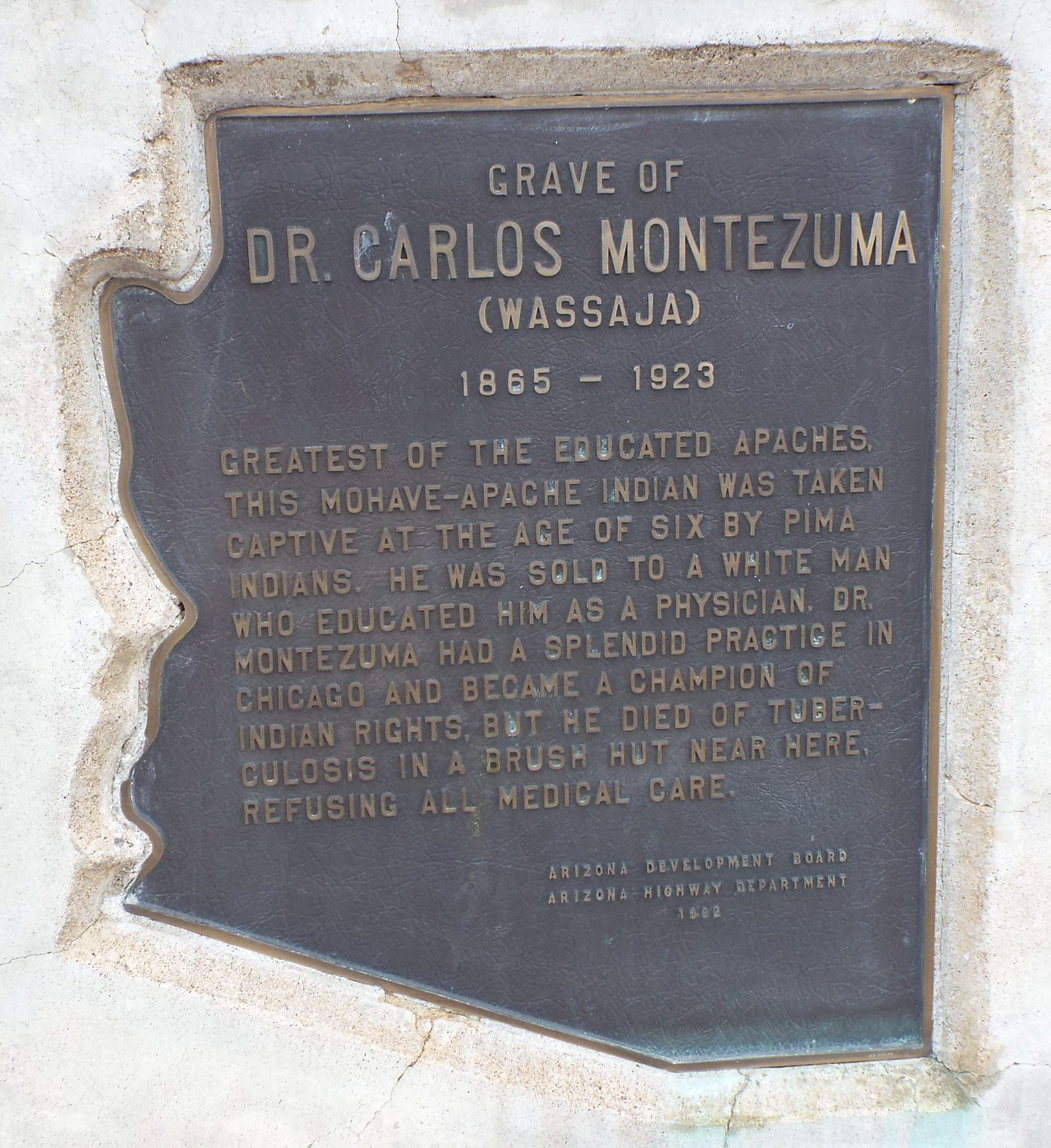
Dr. Carlos Montezuma plaque.

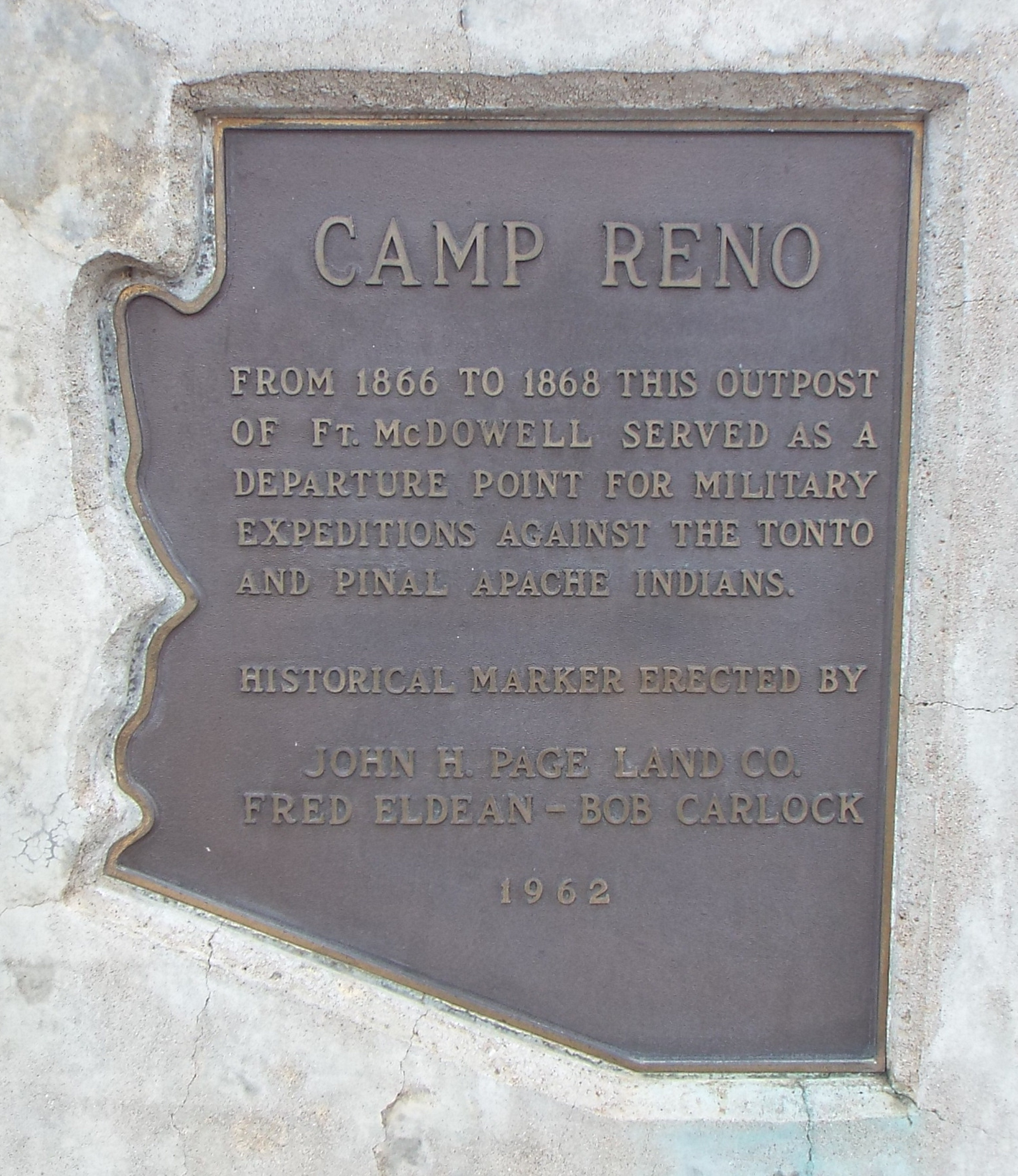
Marker which indicates where the historic Camp Reno was located.

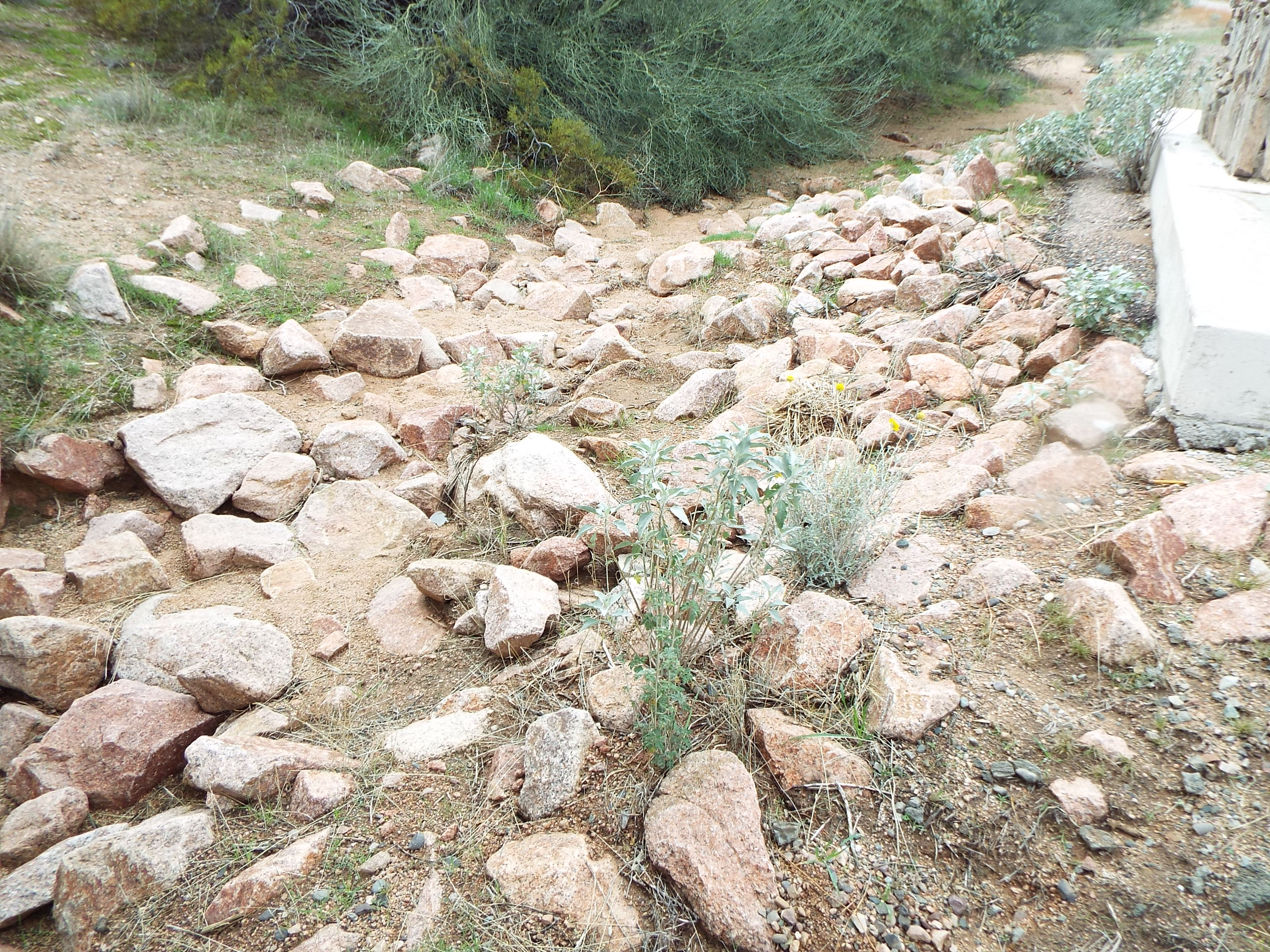
Camp Reno ruins. Camp Reno was a lookout post for Fort McDowell.
