= Rudolph von Medem =

German-born soldier in the U.S. Army

- Born: c. 1846; Prussia
- Died: Unknown
- Military career
- Allegiance: United States of America
- Branch: United States Army
- Service years: c. 1872–1874
- Rank: Sergeant
- Unit: 5th Cavalry Regiment
- Conflicts: Yavapai War: Battle of Sunset Pass
- Awards: Medal of Honor

Rudolph von Medem (c. 1846 – unknown) was a German-born American soldier in the U.S. Army who served with the 5th U.S. Cavalry during the Indian Wars. He was one of three men received the Medal of Honor for "gallantry in action and campaigns" against the Western Apaches in the Arizona Territory during the Apache Wars.

== Biography ==
Rudolph von Medem was born in Prussia in about 1846. He later emigrated to the United States and enlisted in the U.S. Army in New York City, New York. He became a member of the 5th U.S. Cavalry and sent out west to the frontier. Serving with distinction against the Apache Indians in the Arizona Territory, he eventually rose to the rank of sergeant. He was one of three regimental members, the others being fellow Sergeants George Deary and Bernard Taylor, who received the Medal of Honor for "gallantry in action and campaigns", specifically during the Battle of Sunset Pass.

== Medal of Honor citation ==
Rank and organization: Sergeant, Company A, 5th U.S. Cavalry. Place and date: 1872–73. Entered service at: ------. Birth: Germany. Date of issue: 12 April 1875.

Citation:

Gallantry in actions and campaigns.

== See also ==
- List of Medal of Honor recipients for the Indian Wars
