= Stoneman Military Trail =

Supply road in Yapavai & Maricopa Counties, Arizona, 1870–1890

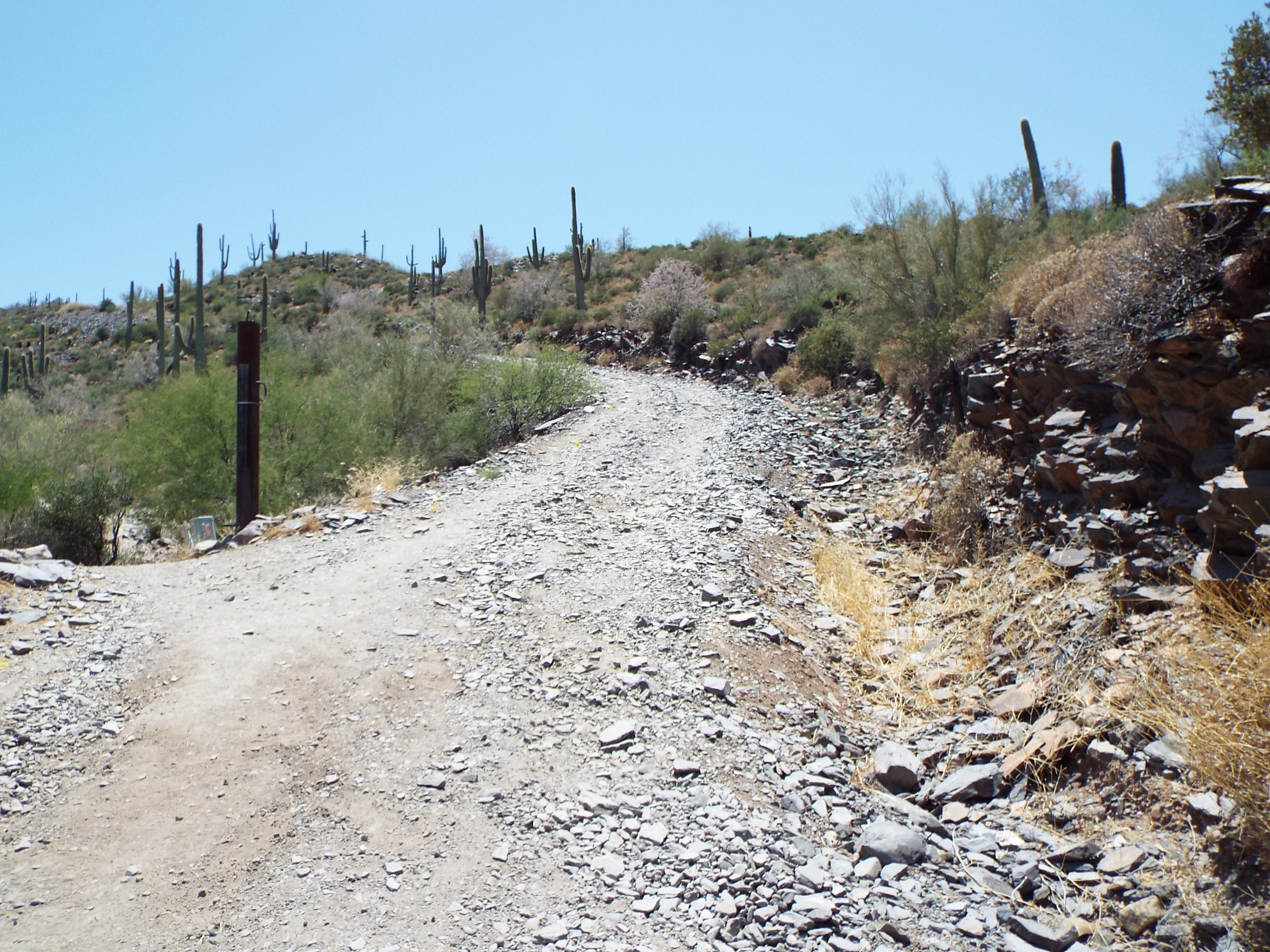
"Stoneman Military Trail" in the Black Mountain of Cave Creek

The Stoneman Road, an important supply road between Fort McDowell and Fort Whipple in Prescott between 1870 and 1890. It was an important conduit for the shipping of supplies from Fort Whipple in Prescott to Fort McDowell on what is today the Yavapai Reservation near Fountain Hills.

== History ==
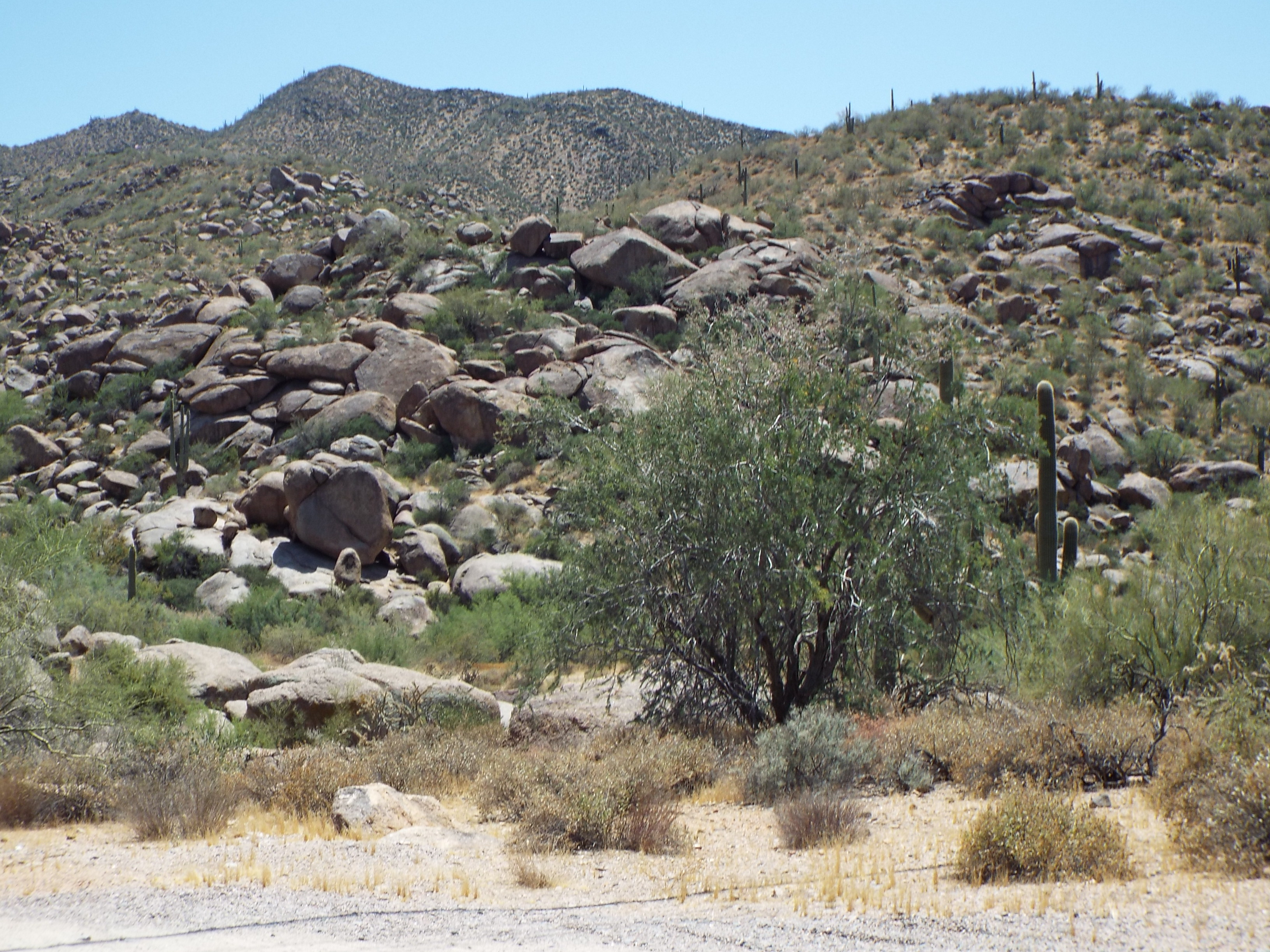
The Black Mountain in Cave Creek

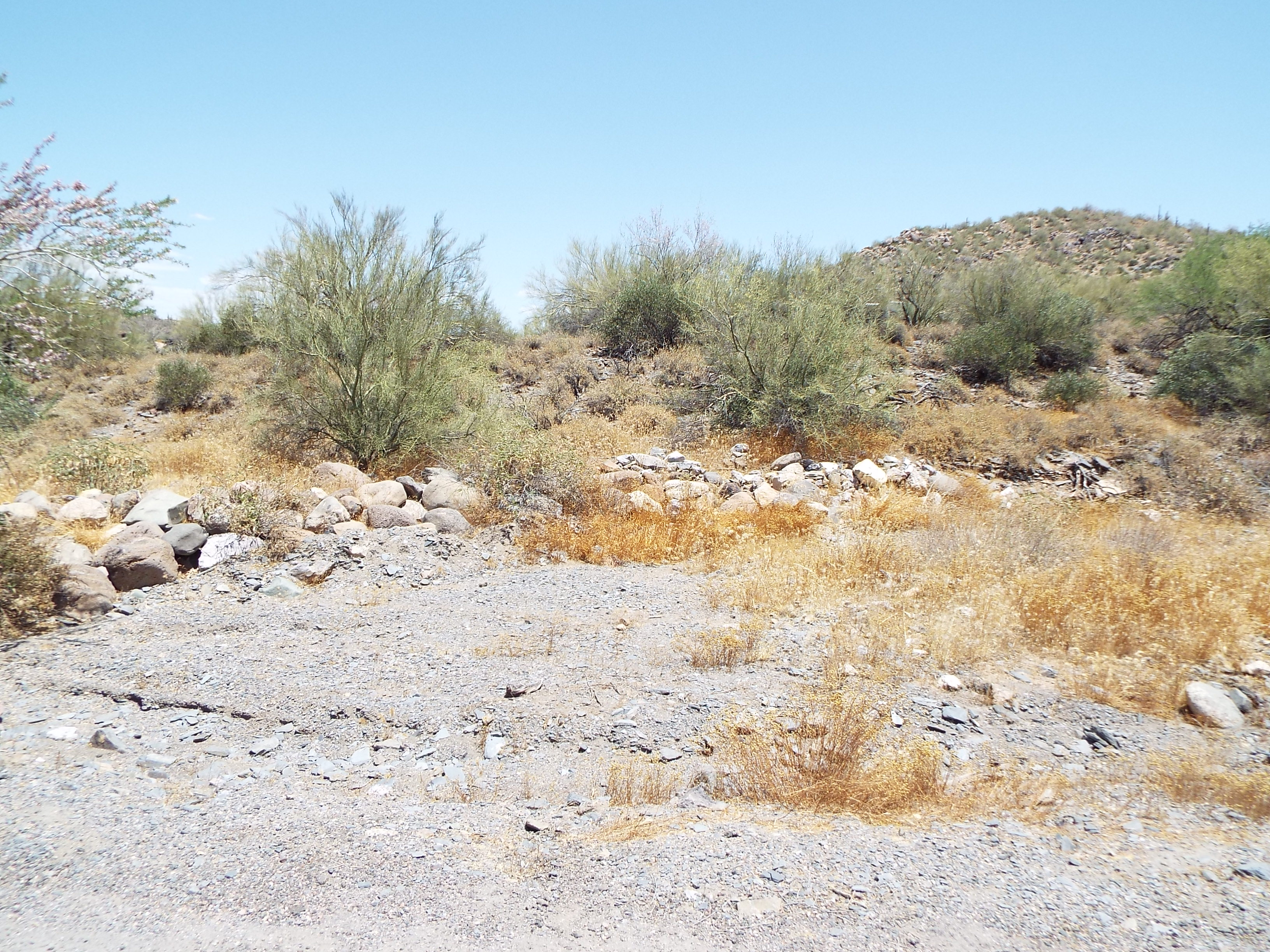
Ruins along the Stoneman Mountain Trail.

Established in 1865, Fort McDowell was continuously short on supplies and before the Stoneman Road was established, the shortages were especially acute as the connection between the forts required a long route that swung south through Phoenix and north to Prescott. With the establishment of the Stoneman Road, a day’s ride was eliminated from the trip. The new route was named after forty-eight-year-old Colonel George Stoneman, a Civil War veteran and career Army man by way of West Point. He was assigned to Arizona in May, 1870 and although he was relieved of his Arizona duties one year later, his establishment of the road between Fort McDowell and Fort Whipple was a major accomplishment of his brief command. Stoneman was a trailblazer and sought a way to Prescott that would avoid the southern route. He found his route by following an old Indian trail that covered part of the distance. The trail was widened into a rocky road that led northwest from Fort McDowell through what is now McDowell Mountain Regional Park, and passed to the north of Pinnacle Peak. It’s believed that soldiers may have camped in the area which is now near 136th Street and Rio Verde Drive.

The road then passed near what would later become Brown’s Ranch and eventually touched the eastern boundary of the area where The Boulder’s resort is located today in north Scottsdale. From there it went past the northern slope of Black Mountain and continued west to Cave Creek. A bubbling spring near what is now Rancho Manana, provided a nice respite for weary travelers. After that it was north along the banks of Cave Creek and crossing into what is now Cave Creek Regional Park. From there it passed through the New River Mountains and Black Canyon, then went north through Mayer to Fort Whipple and Prescott.

== Evacuation Of Fort McDowell ==
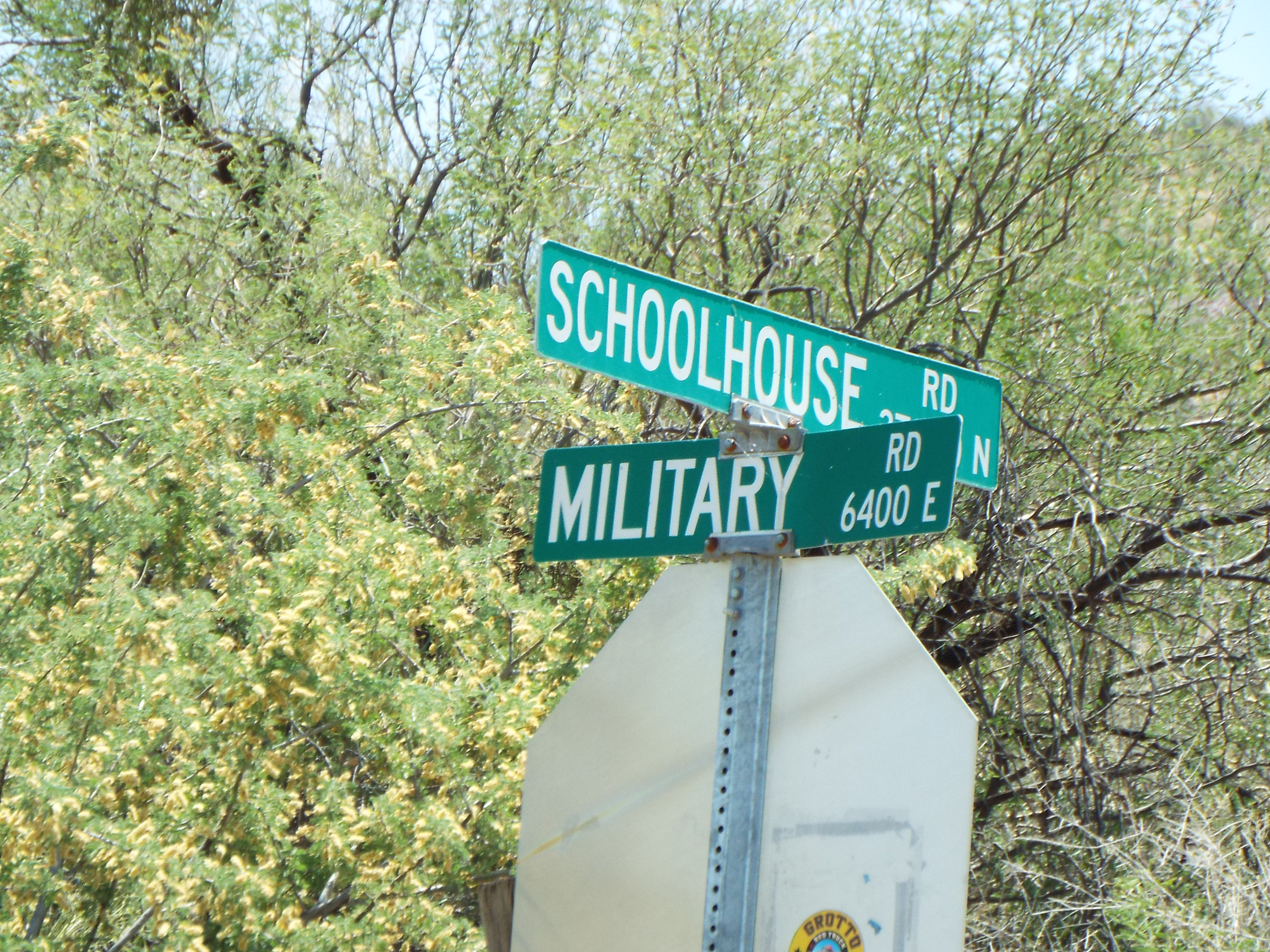
Road sign which indicates where the Stoneman Military passed through

On April 10, 1890, Fort McDowell was vacated by the US military and became the Fort McDowell Indian Reservation which served the Mohave, Pima, and Apache tribes. As far as the Stoneman Road, with the lack of traffic on it after 1890 combined with the attrition of time and the Arizona weather, only minimal traces are left.

== Historical Task Force ==
A historical task force has discovered portions of the road in parts of McDowell Mountain Park and near the old Brown’s Ranch location near north Scottsdale. Another discernible section runs between Stagecoach Pass at Windmill Road northwest to Cave Creek Road ending by a gate going into the Carefree Airport. Running east to west, south of Cave Creek Road, is a short section of the Military Road which is part of the old Stoneman Road. It originally ran toward Cave Creek and by what is thought to be a military remount station from the 1870–1890 era. Other than that, the road has pretty much succumbed to the sands of time.

== Stoneman Trail in Fountain Hills ==
The Stoneman Trail a.k.a. the Stoneman Wash Trail in the McDowell Mountains in Fountain Hills, Az.

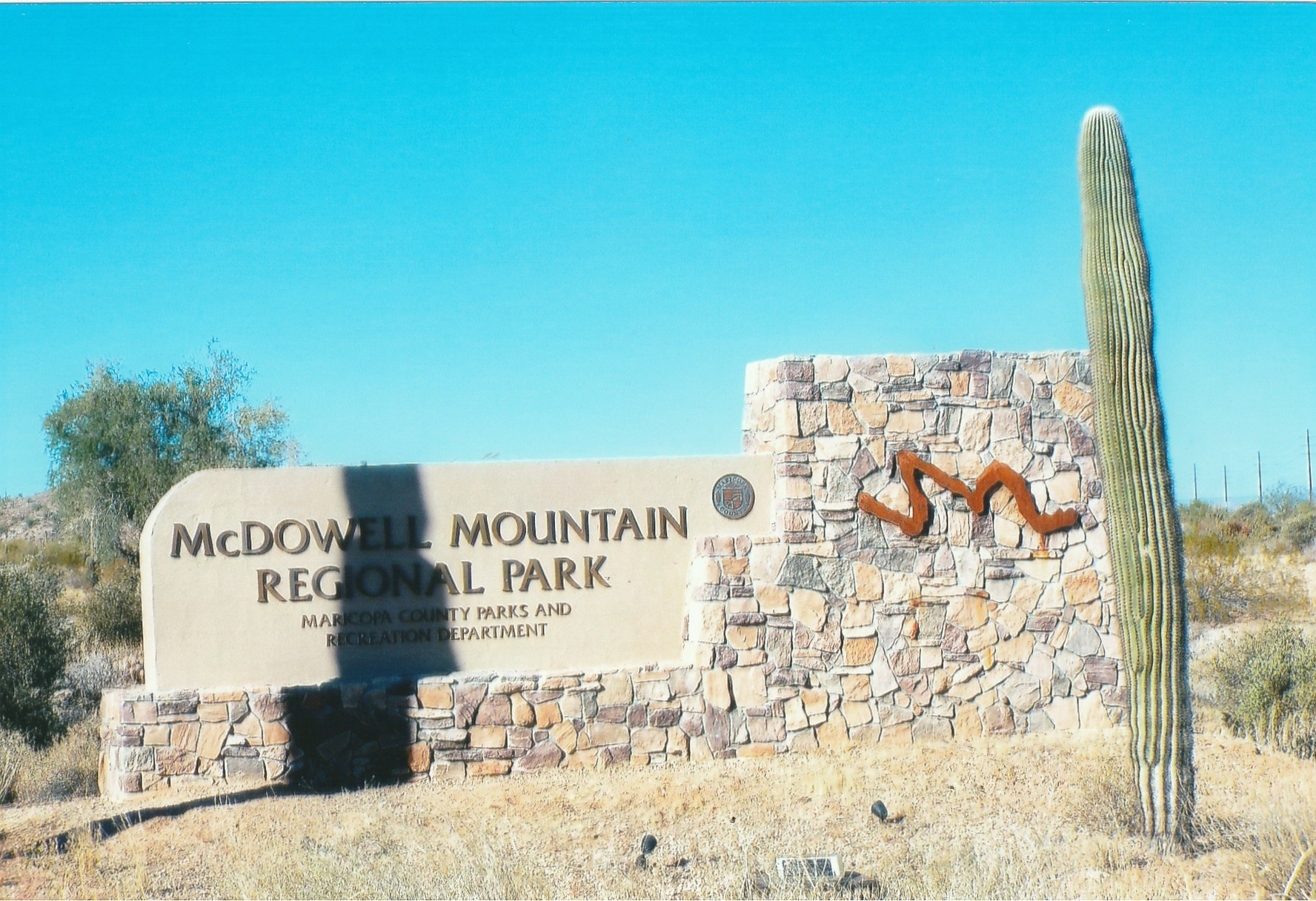

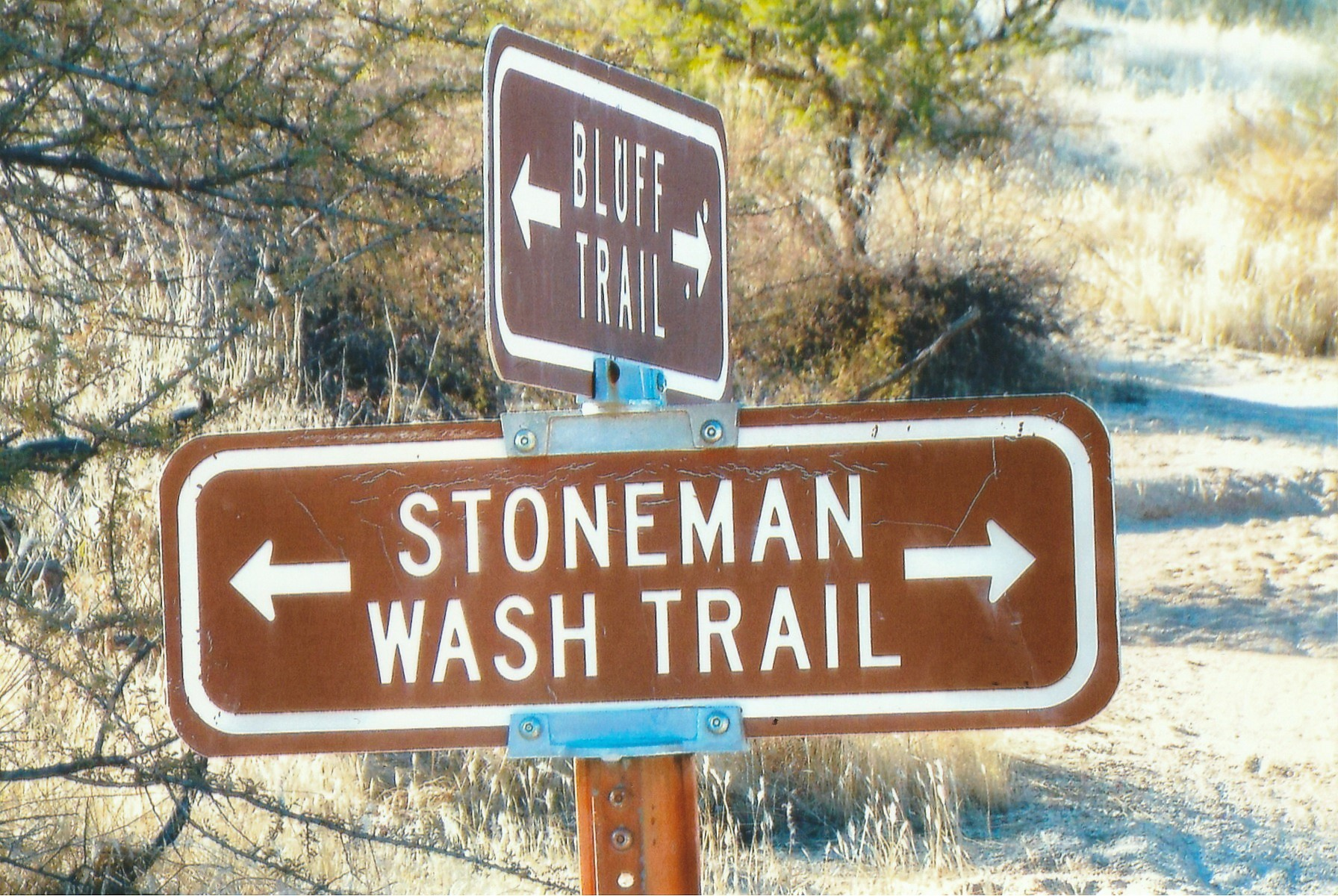
Sign which indicates where the Stoneman Trail a.k.a. Stoneman Wash Trail passed through in the McDowell Mountains of Fountain Hills.

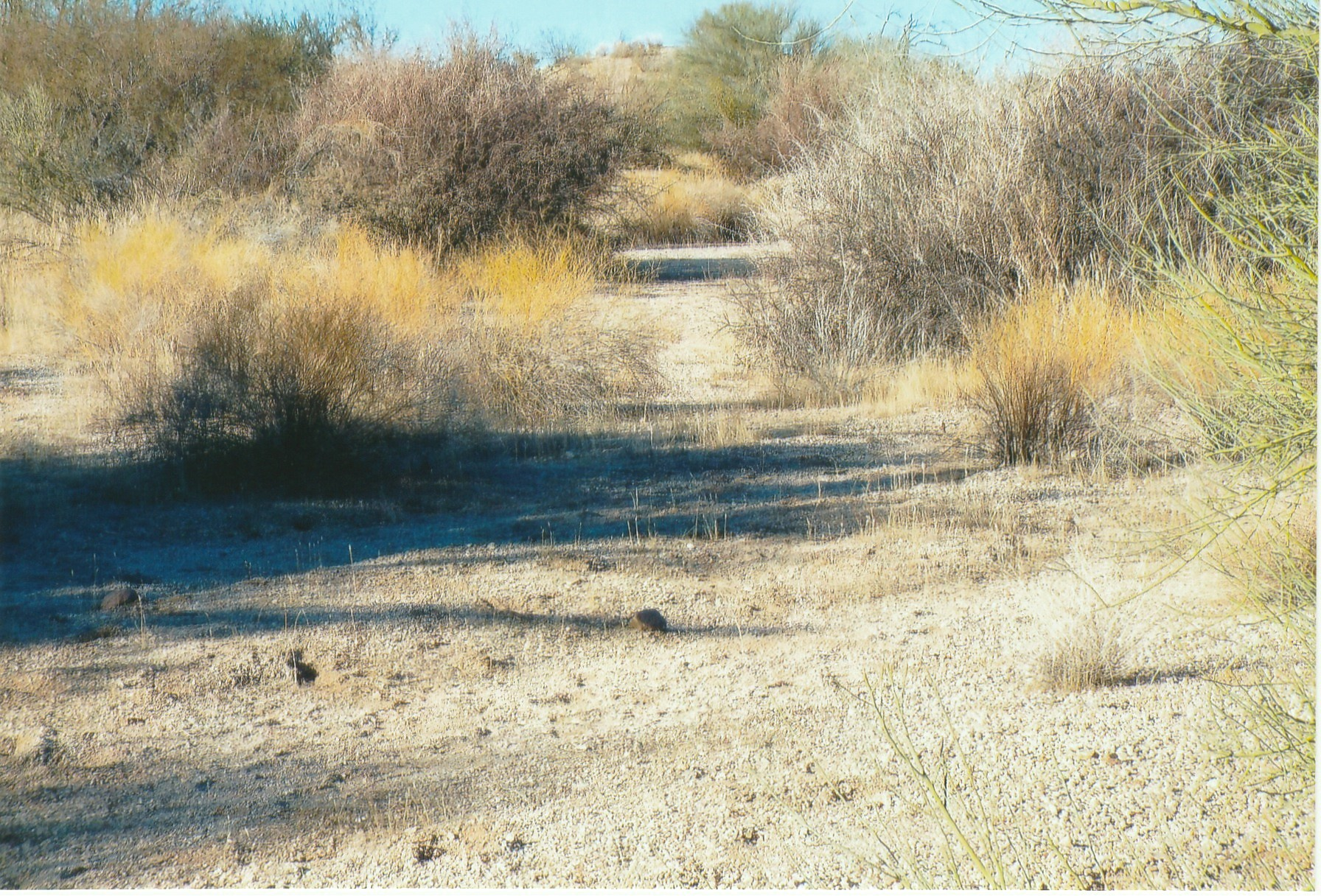
The Stoneman Trail a.k.a. Stoneman Wash Trail

== See also ==
- List of historic properties in Cave Creek, Arizona
