= Skeleton Cave massacre =

Part of the Yavapai War in 1872

- Part of the Yavapai wars
- The site of the massacre circa 1912
- Location: 33.5826°N 111.3659°W; Tonto Basin, Arizona Territory
- Date: 28 December 1872
- Target: Yavapai people
- Attack type: Massacre
- Deaths: 76-100+ killed
- Perpetrator: United States

The Skeleton Cave massacre was the killing of Yavapai people by the US army on December 28th, 1872 in the Arizona Territory during the Yavapai wars.

== Massacre ==
On December 28, 1872, the US army men encountered the Yavapai hiding out at Skeleton Cave, located in the Salt River Canyon northeast of present-day Phoenix, Arizona. The US forces were composed of men from the 5th Cavalry Regiment led by Captain William H. Brown, and were accompanied by 30 Apache scouts. Captain James Burns also participated and led a force of 100 Pima people in the attack.

At least 76 Yavapai were killed in the attack including women and children. Women and children who survived the attack were taken as prisoners to Camp Grant.

== Aftermath and legacy ==
A Yavapai boy named Hoomothya, later named Mike Burns, who witnessed the massacre wrote that "over 225" Yavapai were killed in the attack.

The remains of the vitims were not removed from the cave until 1925 when Mike Burns and a number of other Yavapai recovered and buried them at Fort McDowell Yavapai Nation.

Historian Jeffrey P. Shepherd called the massacre a "genocidal act".
