= Salt River Canyon Wilderness =

Tonto National Forest protected area, Gila County, Arizona

- IUCN category Ib (wilderness area)
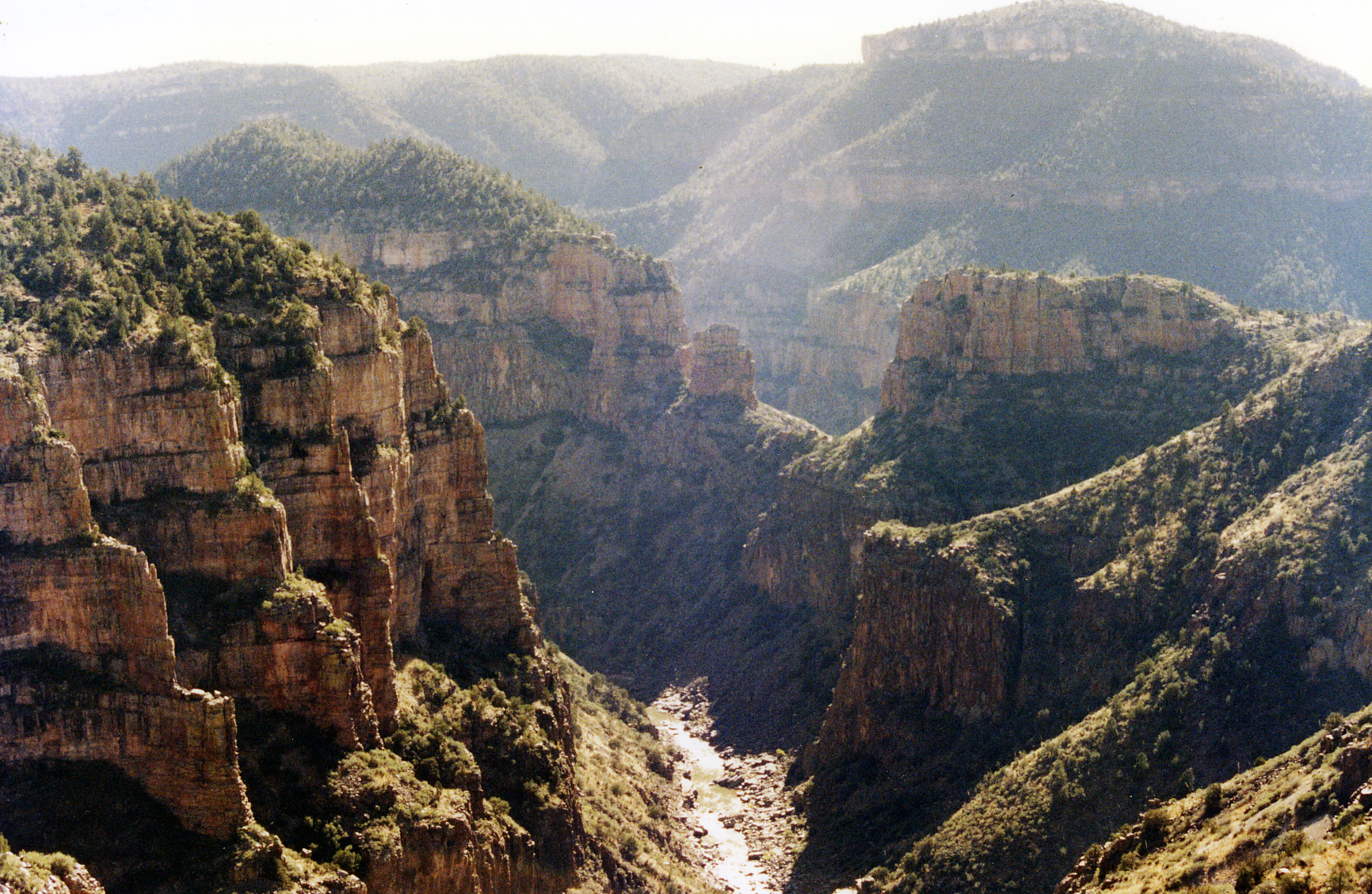
- Salt River Canyon

- Location within the United States
- Location: Gila County, Arizona, USA
- Nearest city: Claypool, Arizona
- Coordinates: 33°39′16″N 110°48′54″W
- Area: 32,101 acres (12,991 ha)
- Established: 1984
- Governing body: U.S. Forest Service

Salt River Canyon Wilderness is a 32,115 acres (12,996 ha) wilderness area located within the Tonto National Forest in the U.S. state of Arizona.

== Background ==
The Salt River and its deep canyon bisect the entire length of the wilderness. Elevations range from 2,200 feet (671 m) at the lower end of the canyon to 4,200 feet (1,280 m) on White Ledge Mountain.

The area can be visited practically any time, though there are no maintained trails within the entire wilderness. Travel here is typically done by raft or kayak during the short river-running season between March 1 and May 15. A visitor permit is required between these dates and group size is limited to 15 people. White-water rafting the Salt River Canyon is fairly popular, with 27 sets of rapids and numerous side creeks to explore.

U.S. Route 60 and Arizona State Route 77 traverse a winding route through the canyon, descending close to the river at the bottom before crossing the river and then ascending back up the opposite side.

== See also ==
- List of Arizona Wilderness Areas
- List of U.S. Wilderness Areas
- Wilderness Act
