= Bernard Taylor (soldier) =

United States Army Medal of Honor recipient (1844–1875)

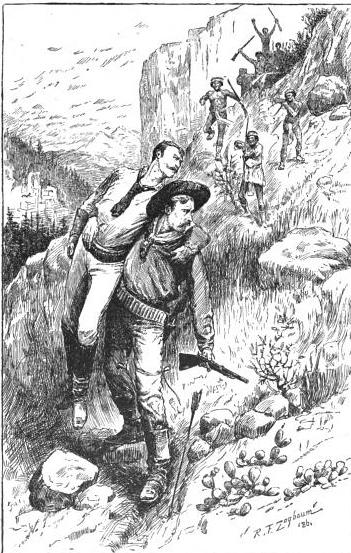
- Taylor rescuing Lt. Charles King
- Born: c. 1844; St. Louis, Missouri, United States
- Died: April 14, 1875 (aged 31); Camp Verde, Arizona
- Burial place: San Francisco National Cemetery
- Military career
- Allegiance: United States of America
- Branch: United States Army
- Service years: c. 1874–1875
- Rank: Sergeant
- Unit: 5th U.S. Cavalry
- Conflicts: Apache Wars Yavapai War: Battle of Sunset Pass
- Awards: Medal of Honor

Sergeant Bernard "Barney" Taylor (c. 1844 – April 14, 1875) was an American soldier in the U.S. Army who served with the 5th U.S. Cavalry during the Apache Wars. He was one of three men received the Medal of Honor for gallantry, Taylor rescuing wounded commander Lieutenant Charles King, while battling the Western Apache near Sunset Pass in Arizona on November 1, 1874. He died two days after receiving the award.

== Biography ==
Bernard Taylor was born in St. Louis, Missouri in 1844. He later enlisted in the United States Army in Washington, D.C. as a private with Company A of the 5th Cavalry. Assigned to frontier duty in the Arizona Territory, Taylor saw action during the Apache Wars and eventually rose the rank of sergeant. He was described as "an admirable specimen of the Irish-American soldier and "hailed as a daring, resolute, intelligent man, and a non-commissioned officer of high merit". On November 1, 1874, Taylor left Camp Verde with a small cavalry patrol headed by First Lieutenant Charles King in pursuit of a hostile Apache war party. After making camp at Sunset Pass, near the Little Colorado River, Taylor and a group of Apache Indian scouts accompanied King to a high vantage point where he could better observe the surrounding area.

While climbing to the summit of a steep mesa, between half to three-fourths of a mile from the camp, the party was ambushed by a band of Tonto Apaches. They had been concealed in the rocks waiting for their approach. King was seriously wounded in the first moments of the attack as an arrow struck his head and another cut the muscles at the corner of his eye. He was finally brought down by a rifle shot which hit his right arm near the shoulder blade and collapsed to the ground. Taylor rescued the half conscious officer and, while under heavy fire, carried him half a mile back to their encampment. King was brought back to Camp Verde while Lieutenant George O. Eaton, then commandant of the camp, continued the pursuit. Taylor was recommended for the Medal of Honor for his heroic act and received the award on April 12, 1875. He was one of three regimental members, including fellow Sergeants George Deary and Rudolph von Medem, who received the award. Near the end of the campaign, two days after being issued the MOH, Taylor died of lung congestion at Camp Verde shortly before his regiment began its homeward march. His body was taken to California where it was interred at San Francisco National Cemetery.

His rescue of King was later included as a chapter in Theo F. Rodenbough's Uncle Sam's Medal of Honor (1886), and was depicted on the cover by then well-known military artist Rufus Fairchild Zogbaum.

== Medal of Honor citation ==
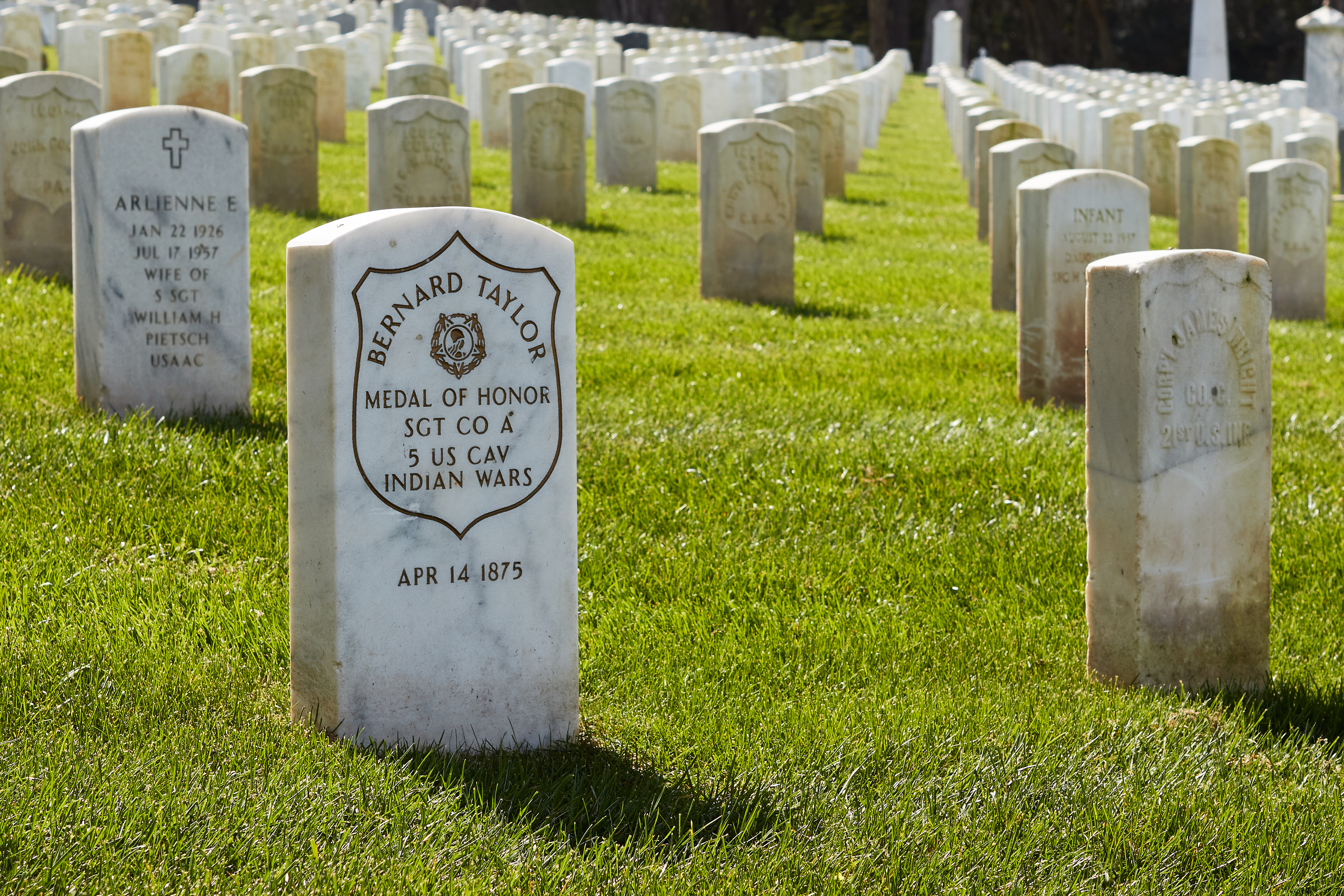
Taylor's gravestone at the San Francisco National Cemetery

Rank and organization: Sergeant, Company A, 5th U.S. Cavalry. Place and date: Near Sunset Pass, Ariz., 1 November 1874. Entered service at: Washington, D.C. Birth: St. Louis, Mo. Date of issue: 12 April 1875.

Citation:

Bravery in rescuing Lt. King, 5th U.S. Cavalry, from Indians.

== See also ==
- List of Medal of Honor recipients for the Indian Wars
