= Indigenous peoples of Arizona =

Native Americans in the US state of Arizona

Indigenous peoples of Arizona are the Native American people who currently live or have historically lived in what is now the state of Arizona. There are 22 federally recognized tribes in Arizona, including 17 with reservations that lie entirely within its borders. Reservations make up over a quarter of the state's land area. Arizona has the third largest Native American population of any U.S. state.

Archaeological evidence for the presence of Paleo-Indians in Arizona dates back at least 13,000 years. Over subsequent millennia, several complex and long-lived cultures emerged; these included the Hohokam, Mogollon, Sinagua, and Ancestral Puebloans, who are all thought to be ancestors of multiple modern tribes. The first Spanish settlers arrived in present-day Arizona in the mid-16th century, later establishing missions and drastically disrupting the indigenous way of life.

Throughout the 18th and 19th centuries, present-day Arizona was ruled in turn by Spain, Mexico, and the United States. Settlers from all three nations encountered resistance from native Arizona communities, particularly the Apache. During 19th and 20th century American rule, Arizona Natives faced forced cultural assimilation under the boarding school system, environmental degradation on reservation lands, and, in some cases, ethnic cleansing.

In the 21st century, Arizona's Native communities continue to play a prominent role in its culture, notably in its tourism industry. However, they also face systemic inequality, including a lack of water infrastructure and an increased susceptibility to health crises such as the COVID-19 pandemic.

== History ==
=== Pre-Columbian era ===
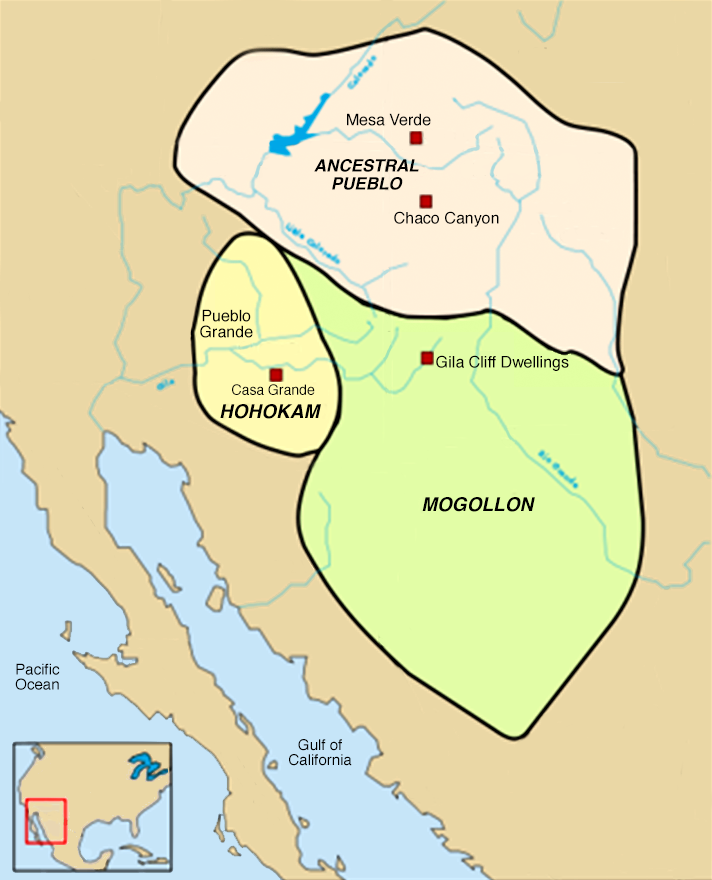
A map showing the extent of the Hohokam, Mogollon, and Ancestral Puebloan cultures circa 1350 CE

Paleo-Indians are believed to have first settled present-day Arizona at least 13,000 years ago. Clovis spear points have been discovered in several locations along the San Pedro River, including at the Naco and Lehner Mammoth Kill Sites. Paleo-Indian peoples were hunter-gatherers who relied highly on North American megafauna for food. The following Archaic period saw these early cultures transition from specializing in big game to a more varied diet, including the advent of early agricultural practices. Archaic cultures identified in present-day Arizona include the San Dieguito complex, the Picosa and subsequent Oshara traditions, and the early Basketmakers.

Following the end of the Archaic period, several prominent cultures emerged in present-day Arizona, including the Hohokam, Mogollon, Sinagua, and Ancestral Puebloans. All of these peoples constructed pueblos, a type of monumental, multi-storied structure that could house as many as several thousand individuals. Several archaeological sites in Arizona that preserve pueblos include the Hohokam Casa Grande Ruins, the Sinagua Montezuma Castle and Tuzigoot, and the Ancestral Puebloan structures of Wupatki National Monument. The Hohokam are also known for constructing an elaborate system of canals in what is now the Phoenix metropolitan area, which formed the foundation of the modern-day Salt River Project that provides water for much of Central Arizona.

During the 13th and 14th centuries CE, the Hohokam, Mogollon, Sinagua, and Ancestral Puebloan peoples all experienced a period of severe depopulation. While the precise causes of this are not definitively known, localized climate change, including severe drought and flooding, has been suggested as a driving factor, as has resource depletion and warfare with newly arrived groups in the region. This time saw the migration of the Athabaskan-speaking ancestors of the Navajo and Apache from the Rocky Mountains, as well as the ancestors of the Yavapai. By contrast, the Hohokam, Mogollon, Sinagua, and Ancestral Puebloans are thought to be ancestral to the modern-day Oʼodham, Hopi, and Zuni people, although this can be difficult to determine with certainty.

=== Spanish and Mexican colonization ===
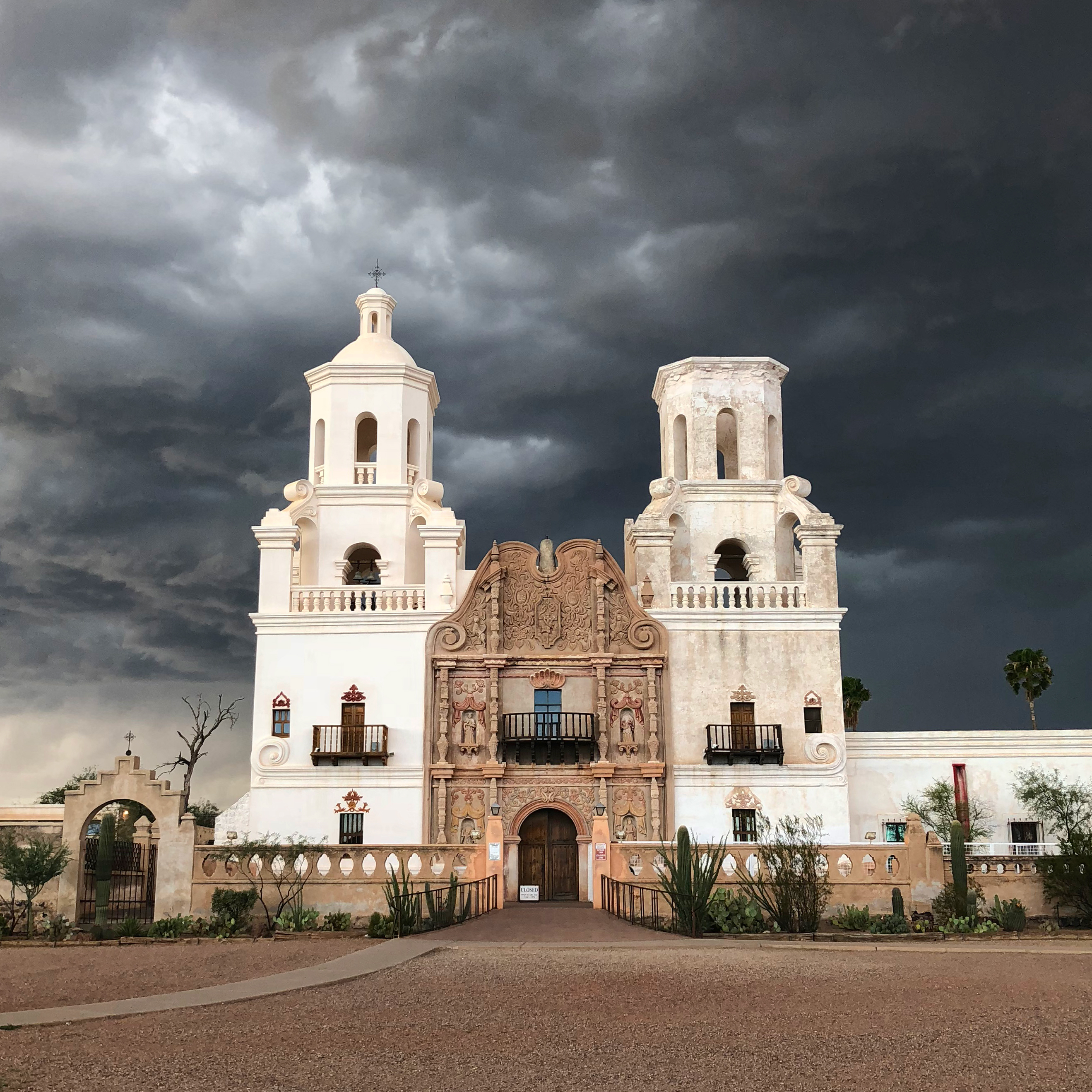
The church of Mission San Xavier del Bac, constructed in the late 18th century near Tucson

The first Europeans to enter present-day Arizona were Marcos de Niza in 1539 and Francisco Vázquez de Coronado in 1540, both of whom encountered the Zuni and were met with resistance. In the second half of the 17th century, the Spanish Empire began widespread exploration of present-day Arizona, including the establishment of over twenty missions in the Pimería Alta by Eusebio Kino to introduce Christianity to the local Akimel and Tohono Oʼodham populations.

By the mid-18th century, decades of violence and forcible lifestyle changes from Spanish colonization led to discontent among the O'odham, who in 1751 ignited the Pima Revolt under the leadership of Luis Oacpicagigua. The late 18th century saw intense rebellion against Spanish rule by the Apache, particularly during the 1770s, which led to the expansion of presidios in present-day Arizona, including the Presidio San Agustín del Tucsón. In the late 1780s, the presidios began to hand out rations to the Apache, which reduced the scope of the conflict.

In 1821, the end of the Mexican War of Independence transferred control over present-day Arizona from the Spanish to the newly-established Mexican Empire, leading to the withdrawal of Spanish troops and the eventual abandonment of every mission but Mission San Xavier del Bac, near Tucson. The end of the Spanish policies that had led to relative peace with the Apache reignited the conflict, leading to decades of bloody Apache–Mexico Wars.

=== American Arizona ===
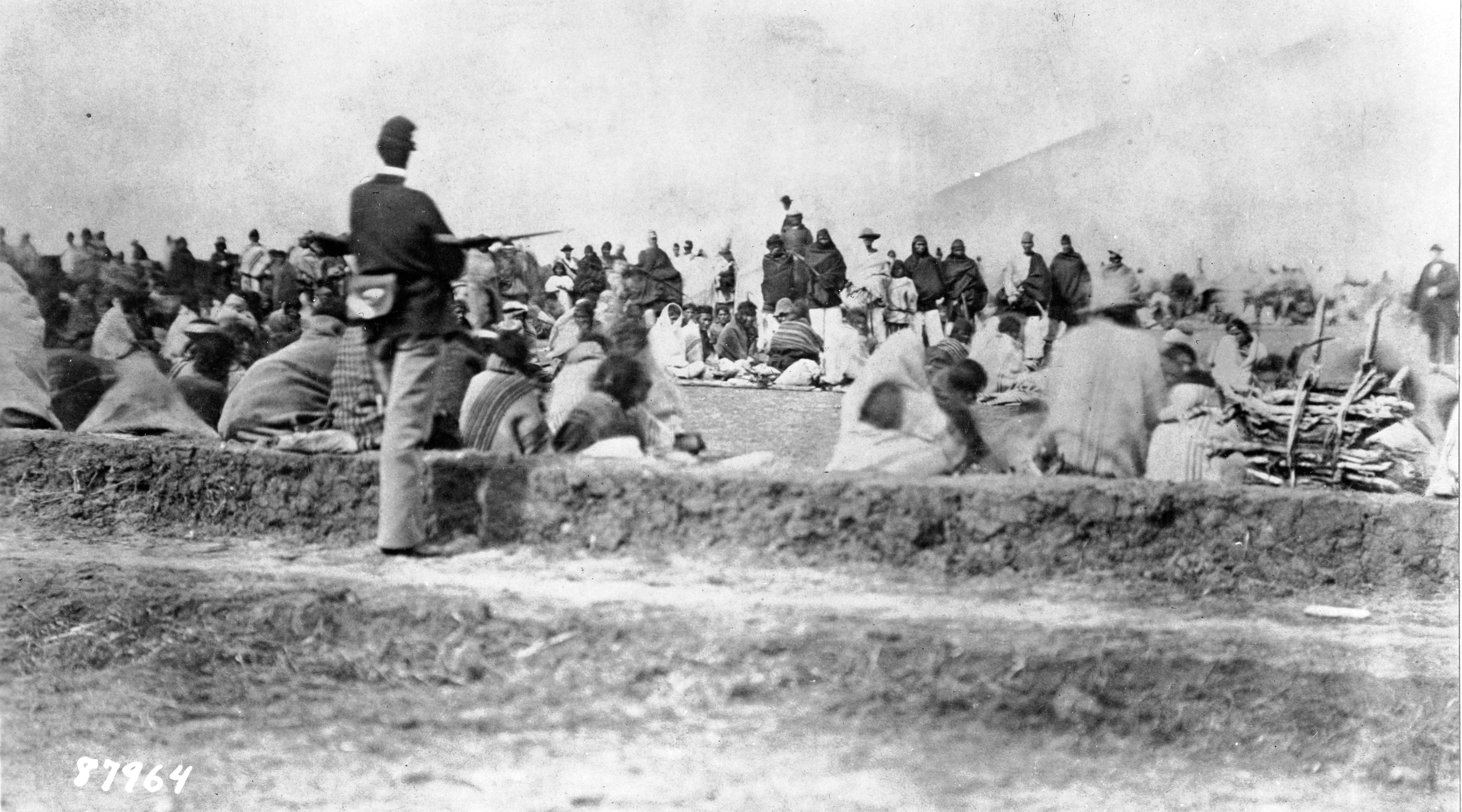
A U.S. soldier stands guard over Navajo people during the Long Walk

A majority of Arizona and a part of New Mexico became administered by the United States during the late 1840s as a result of the American victory in the Mexican–American War; the southernmost portion of the state, including Tucson, was purchased by the U.S. in 1854. Soon after establishing control over the area, the United States government constructed a series of military forts to enforce its authority over the Native population; the first of these, Fort Defiance, was established in Navajo territory in 1851. After a series of conflicts, including the 1860 Second Battle of Fort Defiance, the military commander of New Mexico Territory, James H. Carleton, and Col. Kit Carson launched a relentless campaign against the Navajo. Upon their surrender in 1864, they, along with the Mescalero Apache, were forced to migrate from their land in present-day Arizona to internment camps at Fort Sumner/Bosque Redondo, in an act of ethnic cleansing that would become known as the Long Walk. It is estimated that hundreds of Navajo died during the migration itself, and upward of 2,000 died due to poor conditions at Bosque Redondo. The Army's difficulties in managing the reservation led them to negotiate the 1868 Treaty of Bosque Redondo with the Navajo, which allowed them to return to their land in exchange for establishing a separate reservation there.

The U.S. government also engaged in a series of conflicts with the Apache. Lasting for nearly forty years between 1849 and 1886, the Apache Wars remain the longest armed conflict in U.S. history. Though conflict had erupted earlier in New Mexico, fighting in present-day Arizona was sparked by the 1861 Bascom affair. U.S. campaigns against the Apache, as well as the Yavapai, continued for decades; they were particularly intense following the end of the Civil War, when up to a quarter of all U.S. troops were stationed in the Southwest. The Tohono O'odham, who had themselves been hostile with the Apache since at least the late seventeenth century, were occasional allies for the Americans, such as in 1871, when a coalition of O'odham and American settlers conducted a massacre of 144 Apaches at Camp Grant. The formal end of the Apache Wars is not clearly defined; while 1886, which saw the Apache leader Geronimo surrender to the Americans and many Chiricahua Apache deported to Florida, is often cited, sporadic fighting continued until the early 20th century.

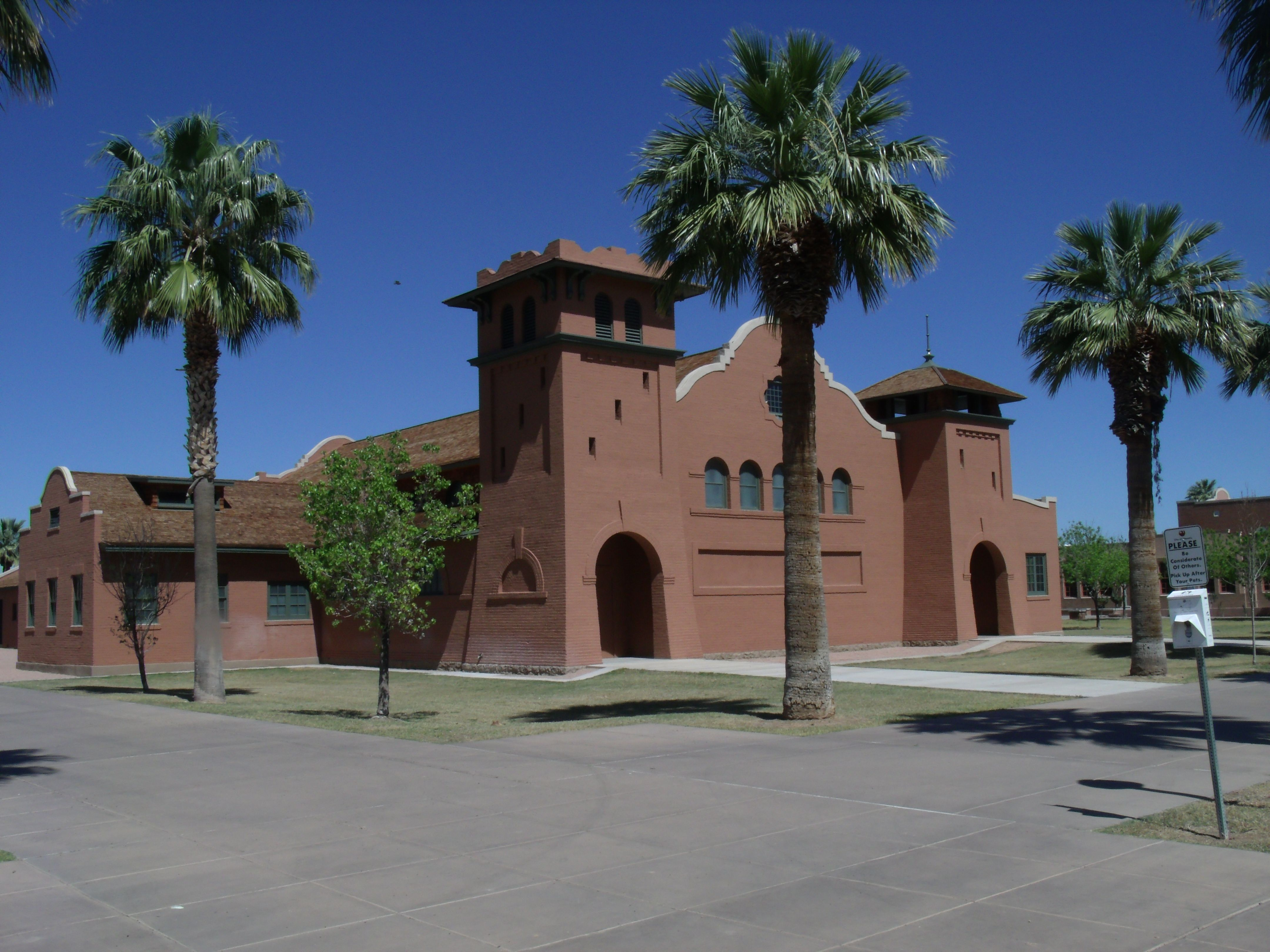
The dining hall of the Phoenix Indian School

In addition to direct conflicts, other aspects of the United States' policy toward Native peoples profoundly affected Arizona Natives' way of life. The establishment of reservations, beginning with the Gila River Indian Community in 1859, sometimes involved the resettlement of indigenous groups away from their traditional land. The second half of the 19th century also saw the establishment of the American Indian boarding school system, including the Phoenix Indian School, founded in 1891. Intended to forcibly assimilate Arizona Native children into American culture, school policies prohibited the use of native languages and clothing and separated children from the same tribe. Although the curriculum underwent heavy reform during the 1930s at the behest of reformist Bureau of Indian Affairs chief John Collier, the school remained open until 1990.

=== 20th and 21st centuries ===
Around the turn of the 20th century, brutal oppression during the Mexican Yaqui Wars drove many Yaquis to flee north to Arizona, becoming the Pascua Yaqui Tribe; by 1940, Arizona was home to around 2,500 Yaquis. Despite this, the Pascua Yaquis were not recognized by the United States government until 1978, when the Pascua Yaqui Reservation was established on the outskirts of Tucson. It is the most recent reservation to be established entirely within Arizona.

The 20th century also saw an increasingly strong movement for self-determination among Arizona Natives, particularly the Navajo. During the construction of the Hoover Dam, John Collier and the U.S. government, believing that Navajo agriculture was causing environmental damage to the area, forced farmers to cull their livestock; the resulting economic impact led the Navajo to engage in organized political resistance and more robust self-governance, a process which accelerated further after World War II. Some Arizona tribes have also engaged in language revitalization initiatives by incorporating indigenous languages into schooling, although state educational standards have at times come into conflict with these programs.

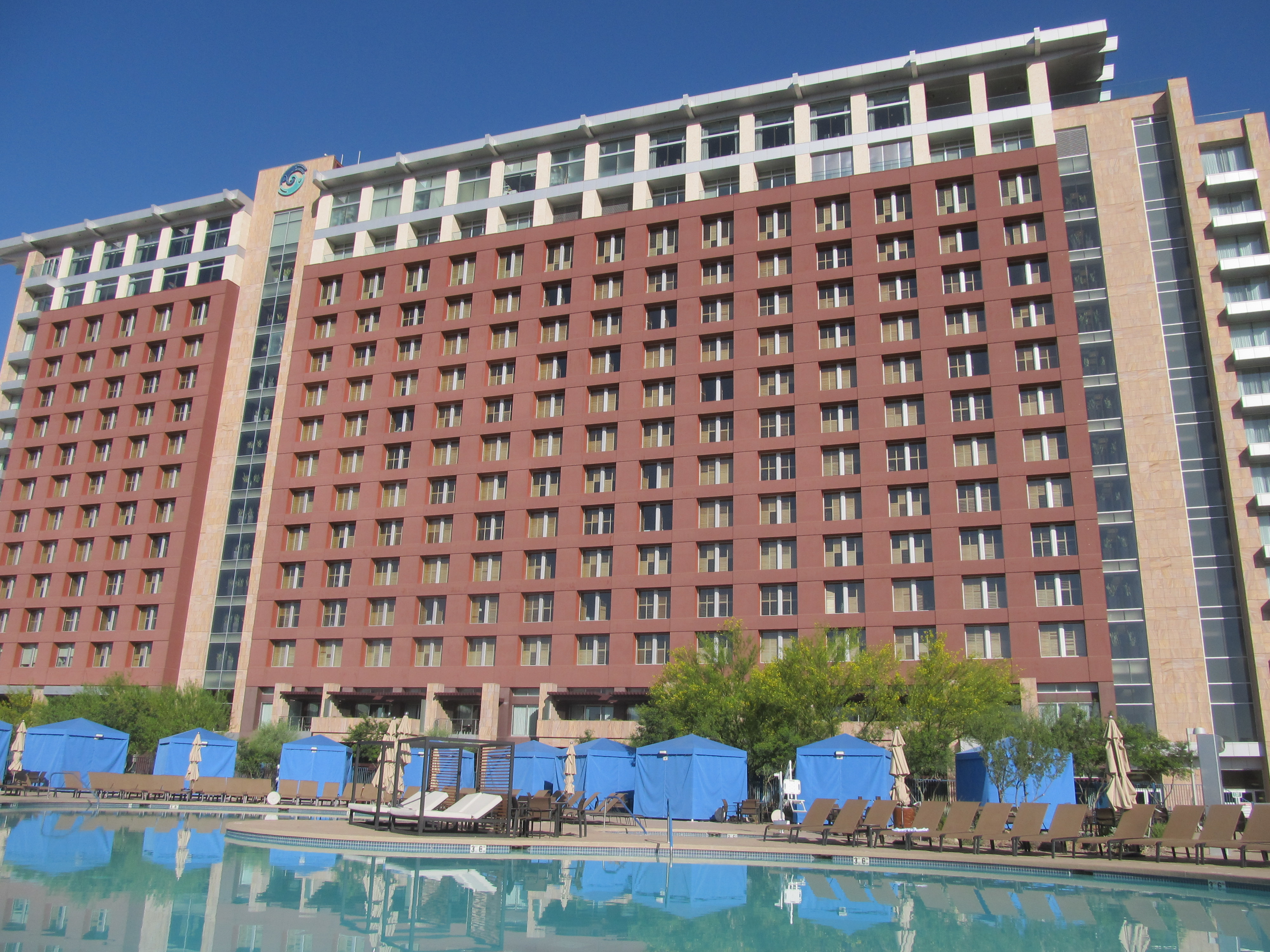
The Talking Stick Resort, a casino run by the Salt River Pima–Maricopa Indian Community

Following the passage of the 1988 Indian Gaming Regulatory Act, which established a regulatory structure for Native American gaming in the United States, many Arizona Native tribes have turned to casinos as a source of income. Although only around forty percent of tribes nationwide operate gaming facilities, that proportion is much higher in Arizona, with 16 of the 22 recognized tribes being involved in gaming. Native-run casinos, along with sites on tribal land, museums, and cultural festivals, have become an important contributor to Arizona's tourism industry in the 21st century.

Native Americans in contemporary Arizona continue to face systemic inequality, compounded by a lack of critical infrastructure. During the COVID-19 pandemic, indigenous peoples, particularly on tribal land, faced disproportionately higher rates of illness. In the Navajo Nation, by far the largest reservation in Arizona, 36% of residents live below the poverty line, 35% of residents lack running water, and thousands of residents lack electricity. Issues of water access have been compounded in recent years by droughts affecting the Colorado River; moreover, the U.S. Supreme Court ruled in Arizona v. Navajo Nation (2023) that the U.S. government has no obligation under the Treaty of Bosque Redondo to supply water to the Navajo.

== List of contemporary peoples ==
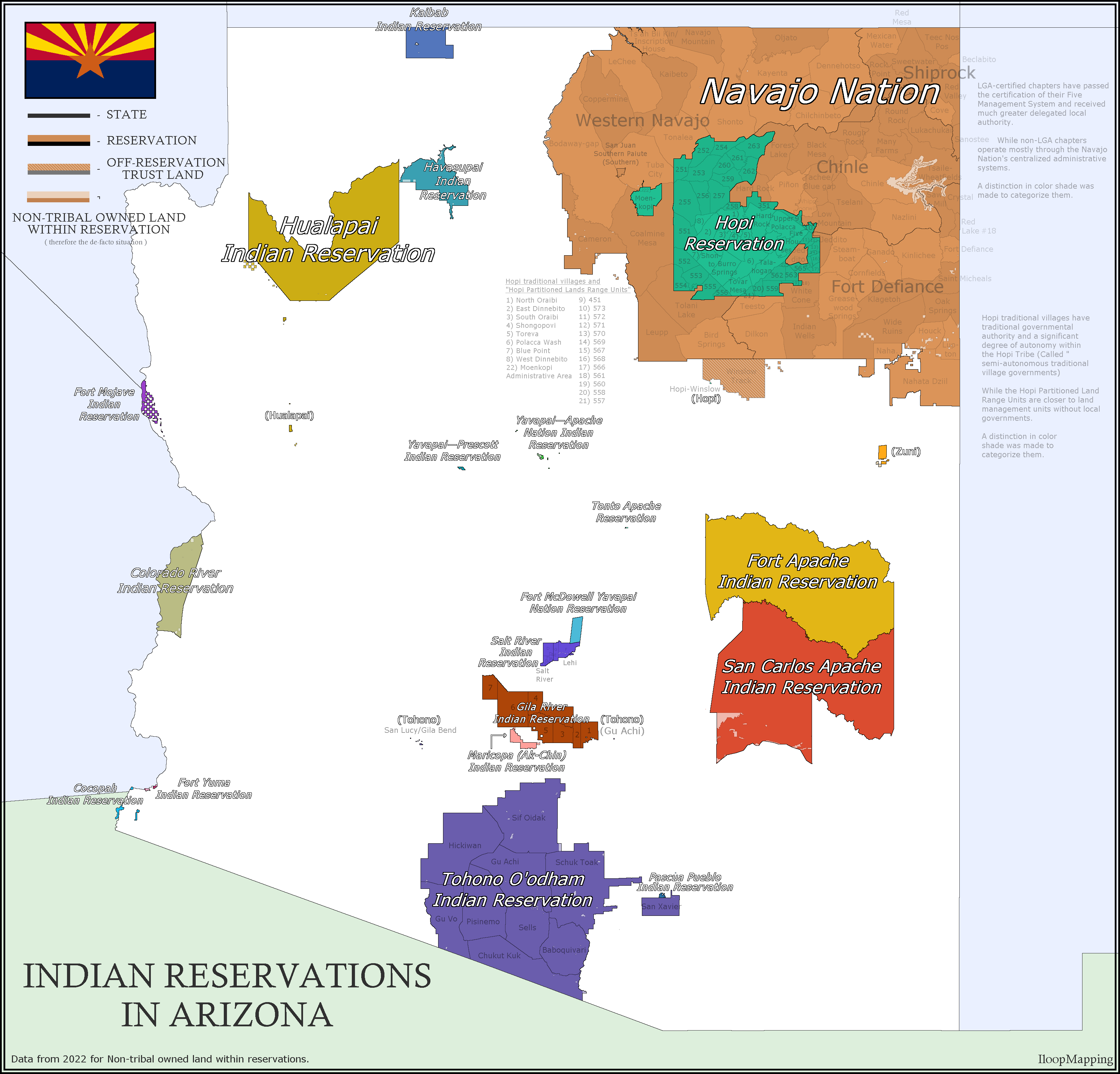
Indian Tribal Reservations in Arizona

- Apache
  - Chiricahua, southeastern Arizona
  - Western Apache
    - San Carlos Apache, southeastern Arizona
    - Tonto Apache, central Arizona
    - White Mountain Apache, eastern Arizona
- Cocopah, southwestern Arizona
- Halchidhoma, central Arizona
- Havasupai, northern Arizona
- Hopi, northeastern and western Arizona
- Hopi-Tewa, northeastern Arizona
- Hualapai, northwestern Arizona
- Maricopa (Piipaash), central Arizona
- Mohave, western Arizona
- Navajo, northeastern Arizona
- O'odham
  - Akimel O'odham (Pima), southern Arizona
  - Hia C-eḍ Oʼodham, southwestern Arizona
  - Tohono O'odham, southern Arizona
- Quechan (Yuma), southwestern Arizona
- Southern Paiute
  - Chemehuevi, western Arizona
  - Kaibab, northwestern Arizona
  - San Juan, northern Arizona
- Yaqui
  - Pascua Yaqui, southeastern Arizona
- Yavapai
  - Kwevkepaya (Southern Yavapai), south-central Arizona
  - Tolkepaya (Western Yavapai), western Arizona
  - Wipukepa (Northeastern Yavapai), north-central Arizona
  - Yavapé (Northwestern Yavapai), northern Arizona
- Zuni, eastern Arizona

== Reservations ==
Name	Arizona County	Tribe	Population (2021)	Area in mi^{2} (km^{2})	Headquarters
Ak-Chin Indian Community	Pinal	Akimel O'odham Tohono O'odham Hia C-eḍ Oʼodham	1,241	34.13 (88.38)	Maricopa
Cocopah Indian Reservation	Yuma	Cocopah	1,252	10.02 (25.95)	Somerton
Colorado River Indian Tribes (Note: Includes land in multiple states)	La Paz	Chemehuevi Mohave Hopi Navajo	8,717	432.22 (1,119.44)	Parker
Fort Apache Indian Reservation	Apache Gila Navajo	Western Apache	14,854	2,627 (6,804)	Whiteriver
Fort McDowell Yavapai Nation	Maricopa	Yavapai	1,057	38.56 (99.87)	Fountain Hills
Fort Mojave Indian Reservation	Mohave	Mohave	1,735	65.44 (169.49)	Needles, CA
Fort Yuma Indian Reservation	Yuma	Quechan	1,372	68.80 (178.19)	Yuma
Gila River Indian Community	Maricopa Pinal	Akimel O'odham Maricopa	12,083	583.75 (1,511.91)	Sacaton
Havasupai Indian Reservation	Coconino	Havasupai	0 (Note: The 2010 census recorded a population of 639. The figure of 0 is considered inaccurate, as the reservation continues to have several hundred residents.)	294.68 (763.22)	Supai
Hopi Reservation	Coconino Navajo	Hopi Hopi-Tewa	8,655	2,531.77 (6,557.26)	Kykotsmovi Village
Hualapai Reservation	Coconino Mohave Yavapai	Hualapai	1,576	1,605 (4,156.93)	Peach Springs
Kaibab Indian Reservation	Coconino Mohave	Southern Paiute	300	188.75 (488.86)	Fredonia
Navajo Nation	Apache Coconino Navajo	Navajo	169,688	27,413 (71,000)	Window Rock
Pascua Yaqui Tribe	Pima	Pascua Yaqui	3,742	1.87 (4.83)	Tucson
Salt River Pima–Maricopa Indian Community	Maricopa	Akimel O'odham Maricopa	6,943	84 (217)	Scottsdale
San Carlos Apache Indian Reservation	Gila Graham Pinal	Western Apache	10,815	2,866.85 (7,425.10)	San Carlos
Tohono Oʼodham Nation	Maricopa Pima Pinal	Tohono Oʼodham	10,554	4,400 (11,300)	Sells
Tonto Apache Tribe	Gila	Western Apache	137	0.59 (1.53)	Payson
Yavapai–Apache Nation	Yavapai	Western Apache Yavapai	871	1.00 (2.60)	Camp Verde
Yavapai-Prescott Tribe	Yavapai	Yavapai	309	2.21 (5.72)	Prescott
Zuni Indian Reservation	Apache	Zuni	8,445	723.34 (1,873.45)	Zuni Pueblo

The San Juan Southern Paiute Tribe, headquartered in Tuba City, is federally recognized, but does not currently have a reservation.

== Languages ==
The indigenous peoples of Arizona speak a variety of languages from several different language families. Speakers of Yuman–Cochimí languages include the Havasupai, Hualapai, Yavapai, Mohave, Halchidhoma, Quechan, Maricopa (Piipaash), and Cocopah. The Navajo and Apache are Southern Athabaskan-speaking people who migrated into the American Southwest from the north, possibly around 1300 CE. Apache bands connected to Arizona include the Tonto Apache, Chiricahua, San Carlos Apache, and White Mountain Apache. The Southern Paiute, including the Chemehuevi, speak the Colorado River Numic language, a Uto-Aztecan language; other Uto-Aztecan speakers include the Hopi, O'odham, and Pascua Yaqui. The Hopi-Tewa speak both Hopi and the Tanoan Tewa language.

The Zuni speak a language isolate. Various theories for relationships between the Zuni language and other languages have been proposed, but none have been widely accepted by researchers.

Indigenous languages of California
Language	Language family	Tribe(s)	Number of speakers
Chiricahua	Athabaskan	Chiricahua	1,500
Cocopah	Yuman–Cochimí	Cocopah	370
Colorado River Numic	Uto-Aztecan	Chemehuevi, Kaibab, San Juan	920
Havasupai–Hualapai	Yuman–Cochimí	Havasupai, Hualapai	1,500
Hopi	Uto-Aztecan	Hopi, Hopi-Tewa	6,100
Maricopa	Yuman–Cochimí	Halchidhoma, Maricopa	35
Mojave	Yuman–Cochimí	Mohave	200
Navajo	Athabaskan	Navajo	170,000
O'odham	Uto-Aztecan	Akimel O'odham, Hia C-eḍ Oʼodham, Tohono Oʼodham	15,000
Quechan	Yuman–Cochimí	Quechan	60
Tewa	Tanoan	Hopi-Tewa	300
Western Apache	Athabaskan	San Carlos Apache, Tonto Apache, White Mountain Apache	13,445
Yaqui	Uto-Aztecan	Pascua Yaqui	640
Yavapai	Yuman–Cochimí	Yavapai	245
Zuni	Language isolate	Zuni	9,620

== See also ==
- List of Indian reservations in Arizona
- Indigenous languages of Arizona
