= List of Indian reservations in Arizona =

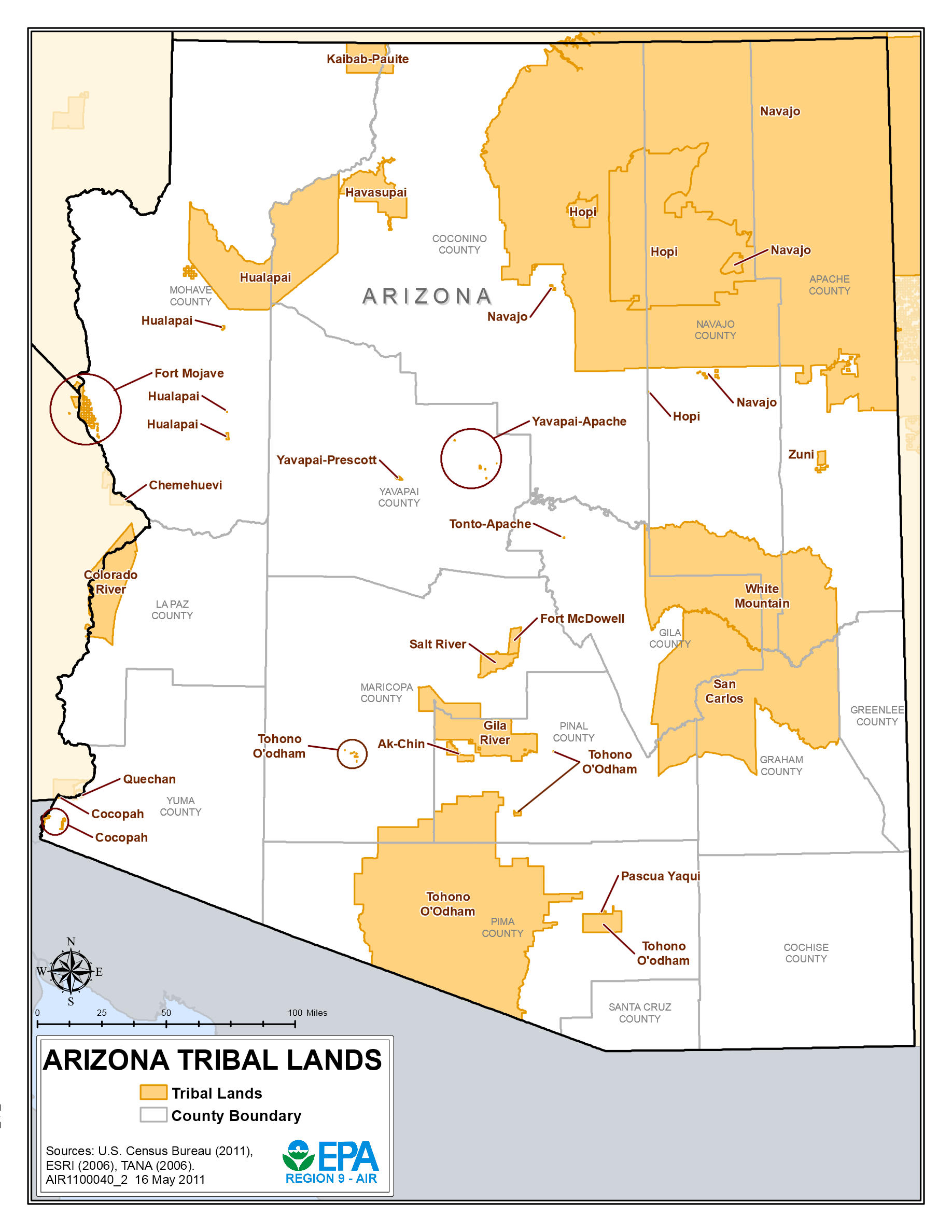
Tribal land

This is a list of Native American reservations in the U.S. state of Arizona.

== List of reservations ==
Official name	Tribe(s)	Endonym	Est.	Pop. (2010)	Area mi^{2} (km^{2})	County	Notes
Ak-Chin Indian Community	Hia C-eḍ Oʼodham, Pima, Maricopa, Tohono Oʼodham	ʼAkĭ Ciñ O'odham	1912	1,001	34.1 (88.3)	Pinal	
Cocopah Indian Reservation	Cocopah	Xawitt Kwñchawaay	1917	817	9.4 (24.3)	Yuma	
Colorado River Indian Reservation	Mohave, Chemehuevi, Hopi, Navajo	Mojave: Aha Havasuu; Navajo: Tó Ntsʼósíkooh	1865	7,077	419.7 (1,087.0)	La Paz	Extends into California (Riverside, San Bernardino)
Fort McDowell Yavapai Nation	Yavapai	A'ba:ja	1903	971	38.5 (99.7)	Maricopa	
Fort Mojave Indian Reservation	Mohave	Pipa Aha Macav	1890	1,004	65.4 (169.4)	Mohave	Extends into California (San Bernardino) and Nevada (Clark)
Fort Yuma Indian Reservation	Quechan	Kwatsáan	1884	2,197	68.1 (176.4)	Yuma	Extends into California (Imperial)
Gila River Indian Community	Pima, Maricopa	O'odham/Pima: Keli Akimel Oʼotham; Maricopa:	1859	11,712	583.7 (1,511.9)	Pinal, Maricopa	
Havasupai Indian Reservation	Havasupai	Havsuw' Baaja	1880	465	293.8 (760.9)	Coconino	
Hopi Reservation	Hopi	Hopituskwa	1882	7,185	2,531.8 (6,557.3)	Navajo, Coconino	
Hualapai Indian Reservation	Hualapai	Hwalbáy	1882	1,335	1,550.2 (4,015.0)	Coconino, Mohave	
Kaibab Indian Reservation	Kaibab band of the Southern Paiute	Kai'vi'vits	1907	240	188.7 (488.7)	Mohave, Coconino	
Navajo Nation	Navajo	Naabeehó Bináhásdzo	1868	173,667	27,413 (70,999.3)	Apache, Coconino, Navajo	Extends into New Mexico (San Juan, McKinley, Sandoval, Cibola, Rio Arriba) and Utah (San Juan), observes Daylight Saving Time (unlike the rest of Arizona)
Pascua Yaqui Indian Reservation	Yaqui	Pasqua Hiaki	1978	3,484	1.8 (4.6)	Pima	
Salt River Pima–Maricopa Indian Community	Pima, Maricopa	O'odham/Pima: Onk Akimel O'odham; Maricopa: Xalychidom Piipaash	1879	6,289	82.2 (212.9)	Maricopa	
San Carlos Apache Indian Reservation	Chiricahua Apache, Cibecue Apache, Lipan Apache, San Carlos Apache, Tonto Apache	Tsékʼáádn	1872	10,068	2,853.1 (7,389.5)	Graham, Gila, Pinal	
Tohono O'odham Nation	Tohono O'odham	Tohono O'odham	1916	10,201	4,446.3 (11,515.9)	Pima, Pinal, Maricopa	The Tohono O'odham Nation governs four separate pieces of land, including the Tohono O'odham and San Xavier Indian Reservations and the San Lucy district near Gila Bend.
Tonto Apache Reservation	Tonto Apache	Dilzhę́’é	1974	120	0.13 (0.34)	Gila	
White Mountain Apache Reservation	Apache (White Mountain)	Dził Łigai Si'án N'dee	1891	13,409	2,609.4 (6,758.3)	Navajo, Apache, Gila	
Yavapai-Apache Nation	Yavapai, Apache (Tonto)	Yavapai: Wipuhk’a’ba; Apache: Dil’zhe’e	1903	718	1.0 (2.6)	Yavapai	
Yavapai-Prescott Reservation	Yavapai	Wiikvteepaya	1935	192	2.2 (5.7)	Yavapai	
Zuni Heaven Reservation	Zuni	A:shiwi	1984	–	19.5 (50.5)	Apache	Over 95% of Zuni land is located in New Mexico (McKinley, Cibola, Catron). Zuni Heaven is primarily a pilgrimage site and has no permanent residents.

== See also ==
- Indigenous peoples of Arizona
- Fort Apache Indian Reservation
- List of federally recognized tribes in Arizona
- List of cities and towns in Arizona
- List of counties in Arizona
