= Sister Claire Marie Wick =

American Religious Sister and founder of charitable programs

- Born: Kathryn Whitener Wick; July 16, 1915; Fredericktown, Missouri, United States
- Died: June 7, 1987 (aged 71); Springfield, Illinois, United States
- Occupation: Roman Catholic Religious sister
- Parent(s): Oscar and Pearl Whitener

Kathryn Whitener Wick (born July 16, 1915), in religion Sister Claire Marie Wick, O.S.F., was an American Religious Sister and founder of charitable programs in Wisconsin and Kenya.

== Early life and education ==
Wick was the daughter of Oscar and Pearl Whitener, and had one sister. Wick grew up in Fredericktown, Missouri, and earned her bachelor's degree in music from Webster University in 1938. She married John Wick, who died in 1942, shortly after their marriage and the birth of her only son. After her husband's death, she entered the Hospital sisters of St. Francis on Sept. 8, 1954, and pronounced her religious vows on June 13, 1957.

== Career ==
After her first profession of vows, Wick was missioned to St. John's Hospital where she pioneered a hospital music therapy program. After seven years at St. John's, she left to develop the music therapy programs at Sacred Heart Hospital in Eau Claire, Wisconsin. Wick later graduated from the University of Wisconsin with a master's degree in music. Wick also spent time on a Navajo Reservation in Chinle, Arizona as a music instructor.

=== Triniteam, Inc. ===
Inspired by Mother Teresa and her charities, Wick founded a nonprofit social service agency based in Eau Claire called Triniteam, Inc. in 1973. The organization was incorporated in 1977. The organization offers several programs including services for the elderly, disabled, homeless, and recently incarcerated in eight different Wisconsin counties, and has also developed clean water projects in Kenya. In 1984, Wick was appointed to the Wisconsin Council of Criminal Justice by Governor of Wisconsin Anthony Earl. The next year, she was appointed to the Justice and Peace Commission by Bishop John Joseph Paul of the Roman Catholic Diocese of La Crosse.

Sister Claire Wick was a recipient of the Brother James Miller Justice and Peace Award and the Catholic Veterans Award.
