= Tonto Apache =

Western Apache people of Arizona, US

Dilzhę́’é

Regions with significant populations
- U.S. (Arizona)

Languages
- Tonto Apache dialect of the Western Apache language

Religion
- Indigenous religion, Christianity

Related ethnic groups
- other Western Apache, Yavapai

The Tonto Apache (Western Apache: Dilzhę́’é, Dilzhe'e, and Dilzhe’eh Apache) is a band of Western Apache people next to Payson, Arizona.

The term "Tonto" is also used for their dialect, one of the three dialects of the Western Apache language, a member of Southern Athabaskan language family.

Today, Tonto Apache people are enrolled in several federally recognized tribes in Arizona. These include:

- Fort McDowell Yavapai Nation
- San Carlos Apache Tribe of the San Carlos Reservation
- Tonto Apache Tribe of Arizona
- White Mountain Apache Tribe of the Fort Apache Reservation
- Yavapai-Apache Nation of the Camp Verde Indian Reservation.

== Name ==
=== Endonym ===
The name Dilzhę́’é is a Western Apache name that may translate as "people with high-pitched voices," but the etymology is unclear.

The Dilzhe’e Apache refer to themselves (endonym or autonym) as Dilzhę́’é, as do the San Carlos Apache. The Western Apache from Bylas use the word Dilzhę́’é to refer to both the San Carlos and Tonto Apache groups.

=== Exonym ===
The White Mountain Apache use the term Dilzhę́’é to refer to the Bylas, San Carlos, and Tonto Apache. The Chiricahua called the Tonto Apache Ben-et-dine, Binii’e’dine’ or Bíniʼ Ádinii ('brainless people, people without minds', i.e. 'wild, crazy, those whom you don't understand'). The neighboring Western Apache ethnonym for them was Koun'nde ('wild rough people'), from which the Spanish derived their use of Tonto ('loose, foolish') for the group. The kindred but enemy Navajo to the north called both the Tonto Apache and their allies, the Yavapai, Dilzhʼíʼ dinéʼiʼ, literally translated as 'people with high-pitched voices'.

The name Tonto is considered offensive by some, due to its etymology and meaning in Spanish, although that usage was derived from their learning the names by which neighboring groups referred to the Dilzhe’e. The name Tonto Apache has been widely used by most people outside the Western Apache communities. The term Tonto is encountered the more frequently in anthropology literature, especially older works, than Dilzhe’e.

== History ==
=== Interaction with neighboring Yavapai ===
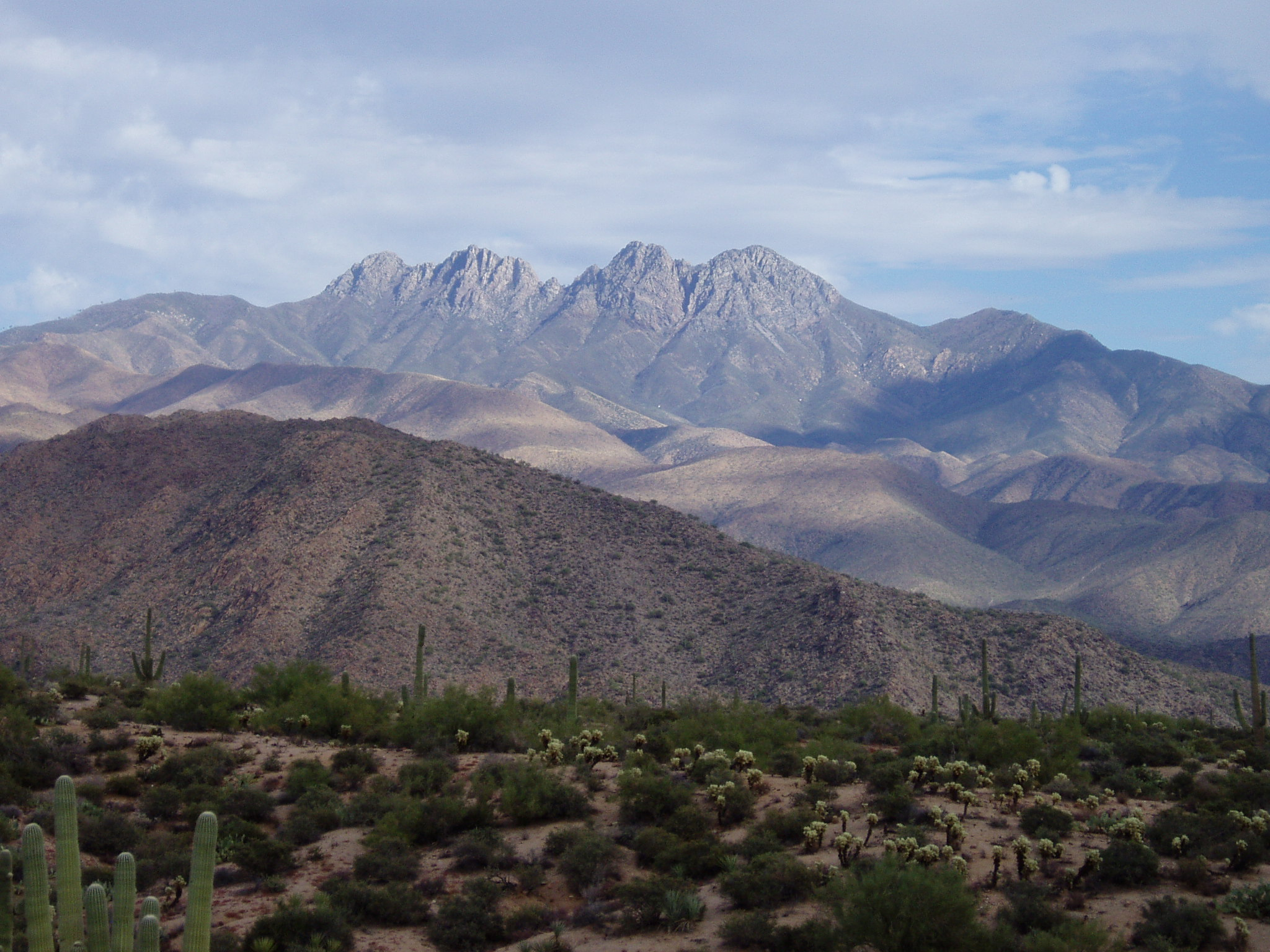
Four peaks of the Mazatzal Mountains

The Tonto Apache lived alongside the Wipukepa (“People from the Foot of the Red Rock”) and Kewevkapaya, two of the four subgroups of the Yavapai of central and western Arizona. The Tonto Apache territory stretched from the San Francisco Peaks, East Verde River and Oak Creek Canyon along the Verde River into the Mazatzal Mountains and to the Salt River in the SW and the Tonto Basin in the SE, extending eastwards towards the Little Colorado River in Arizona. The Dilzhę́’é Apache (Tonto Apache) lived usually east of the Verde River (Tu Cho n'lin, "big water running," or Tu'cho nLi'i'i, "big water flowing"), and most of the Yavapai bands west of it. The Wipukepa tribal areas in the San Francisco Peaks, along the Upper Verde River, Oak Creek Canyon, and Fossil Creek overlapped with those of the Northern Tonto Apache. Likewise, the Kwevkepaya shared hunting and gathering grounds east of the Verde River, along Fossil Creek, East Verde River, Salt River, and in the Superstition Mountains, Sierra Ancha and Pinaleno Mountains with Southern Tonto Apache and bands of the San Carlos Apache. Therefore they formed bilingual mixed-tribal bands, whose members could not be readily distinguished by outsiders (Americans, Mexicans or Spanish) except by their languages. The Apache spoke the Tonto dialect of the Western Apache language (Ndee biyati' / Nnee biyati') and the Yavapai spoke the Yavapai language, a branch of Upland Yuman. Living together in common rancherias, whether they considered themselves to be Apaches or Yavapais, depending on their mother tongue as the origin of the matrilineal society, directed by the mother. Most of them spoke both languages, and the headman of each band usually had two names, one from each tradition. The ethnic Europeans referred to the Yavapai and Apache together as Tonto or Tonto Apache. The peoples raided and warred together against enemy tribes such as the Tohono O'odham and the Akimel O'odham. Scholars cannot tell from records whether the writers of the time when using the term Tonto Apache, were referring to Yavapai or Apache, or those mixed bands. In addition, the Europeans often referred to the Wipukepa and Kwevkepaya incorrectly as the Yavapai Apache or Yuma Apache. To further confusion, the Europeans referred to the Tolkepaya, the southwestern group of Yavapai, and the Hualapai (who belonged to the Upland Yuma peoples) as Yuma Apache or Mohave Apache.

Ethnological writings describe some major differences between Yavapai and Tonto Apache peoples. Yavapai were described as taller, of more muscular build, well-proportioned and thickly featured while the Tonto Apaches were slight and less muscular, smaller of stature and finely featured. The Yavapai women were seen as stouter and having "handsomer" faces than the Yuma in the Smithsonian report. Another difference, which could probably not have been noticed at long range, was that the Yavapai were often tattooed, while Apaches seldom had tattoos. Painted designs on faces were different, as were funeral practices. In clothing, Yavapai moccasins were rounded, whereas the Apaches had pointed toes. Both groups were hunter-gatherers, but were so similar here that scholars are seldom able to distinguish between their campsites.

=== Relations with Apache and other tribes ===
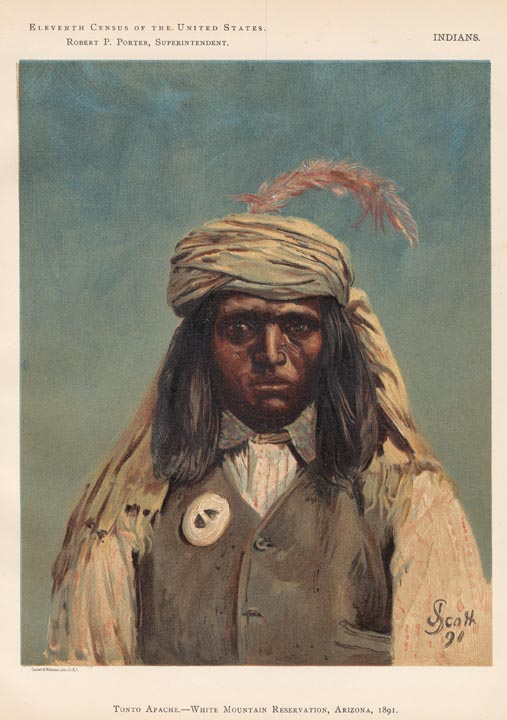
Lithograph of a Tonto Apache man, 1891

The Western Apache groups, adjacent Tonto Apache bands and Chiricahua bands lived in relative peace with each other. There were occasional mutual raids, especially against the southern bands of the Chiricahua. The close connection with the Yavapai may have helped inform the dialect Tonto Apache, which is most distinct from the other two Apache dialects.

The Tonto Apache competed more with the Navajo (in Apache Yúdahá – 'Live Far Up' – 'Those who live up north') and the "Enemy Navajo" (Nda Yutahá – 'Navajo White Man' or 'Navajo who live like white men'), and the peoples engaged more in open conflict. From their sheep raising, the Navajo were able to acquire more European goods in trade, such as blankets, foods, and various tools, which the Tonto lacked. In addition, "Enemy Navajo" often served as scouts against the Tonto Apache for the hostile tribes and Europeans. Sometimes the Apache exchanged the stolen cattle and horses they had acquired in raids for the prestigious Navajo blankets while maintaining peace with the Navajo.

Typically hunter-gatherers, the Tonto Apache hunted antelope, deer, birds, bush rats, and other game and harvested wild agave, berries, wild plants, seeds. The women also cultivated watermelons, pumpkins, corn, later grain, and other crops. Historically, when food stocks were running low and the stored food supplies were depleted, it was common that a respected woman (so-called 'woman chief' or elder) brought public attention to the plight. The woman asked the leaders of the rancheria to go on raids against other Indians and European-Americans to raid to acquire what was needed. The Western Apache raided over an area from the Colorado River in western Arizona, to the Zuni (Nashtizhé – 'black-dyed eyebrows') and Hopi (Tseka kiné ` – 'people who dwell in stone houses') in the north, to the later Mexican states of Sonora, Chihuahua, Sinaloa and Durango in the far south.

== Reservation life ==
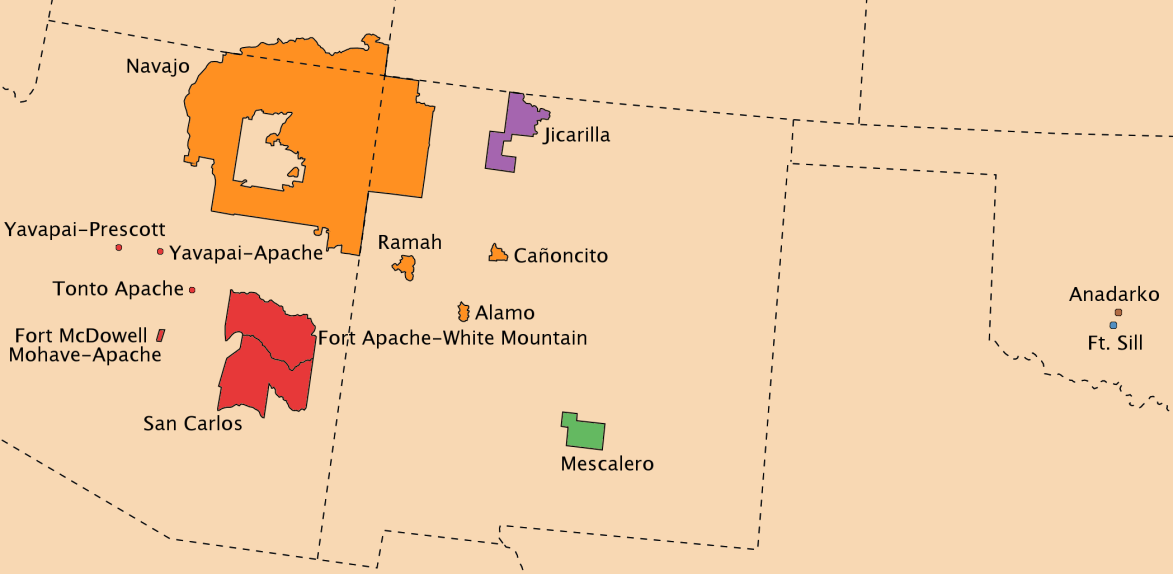
Apache Indian reservations

=== Yavapai-Apache Nation Indian Reservation ===
After being relocated to the Camp Verde Reservation, on the Verde River near Camp Verde, the Yavapai and Tonto Apache began to construct irrigation systems (including a five-mile (8 km) long ditch). These functioned well enough for them to reap sufficient harvests, making the tribe relatively self-sufficient. But, contractors who worked with the United States government to supply the reservations were disappointed, and petitioned to have the reservation revoked. The government complied, and in March 1875, the government closed the reservation. They forced the residents to travel by foot in winter 180 miles (290 km) to the San Carlos Reservation. More than 100 Yavapai died during the winter trek.

By the early 20th century, many Yavapai moved away from the San Carlos Reservation. They requested permission to live on the grounds of the original Camp Verde Reservation. In 1910, the US government set aside 40 acres (161,874 m^{2}) as the Camp Verde Indian Reservation, and in the following decade added 248 acres (1,003,620 m^{2}) in two parcels, which became the Middle Verde Indian Reservation. These two reservations were combined in 1937, and the people formed the federally recognized Camp Verde Yavapai-Apache Nation.

Today, the reservation spans 665 acres (2.7 km^{2}), in four separate locales. Tourism contributes greatly to the economy of the tribe. Their reservation has many significant historic sites which have been preserved, including the Montezuma Castle National Monument. The Yavapai-Apache Nation is the amalgamation of two historically distinct tribal people; the Yavepe (Central Yavapai), Wipukepa (Wipukapaya) (Northeastern Yavapai) and Kewevkapaya (Southeastern Yavapai) People and the Tonto Apache (Dilzhe’e Apache), each of whom occupied the Upper Verde prior to European invasion. The Tonto Apache, calling themselves Dilzhe'e, utilized the lands to the north, east and south; while the various Yavapai bands were using country to the north, the west and the south. They overlapped in the Upper Verde.

=== Fort McDowell Yavapai Reservation ===
The Fort McDowell Yavapai Nation is located within Maricopa County, Arizona, approximately 20 miles from Phoenix. The 40 square miles (100 km^{2}) reservation was authorized by President Theodore Roosevelt from the former Fort McDowell in 1903. By 1910, the Office of Indian Affairs was trying to relocate its residents to open up the area for development and enable other interests to use its water rights. A delegation of Yavapai testified to a Congressional Committee against this action, and won.

Today, the tribal community consists of 900 members, 600 of whom live on the reservation. The Guwevka'ba:ya or Southeastern Yavapai on Fort McDowell Reservation call themselves Aba:ja (″The People"). The population of Fort McDowell consists mostly of the Guwevka'ba:ya Yavapai as well as other Yavapai groups.

=== Tonto Apache Reservation ===
Location of Tonto Apache Reservation

The Tonto Apache Reservation, located south of Payson, Arizona (in Apache: Te-go-suk – “Place of the Yellow Water” or “Place of the Yellow Land”) in ancestral territory of one of the principal Dilzhe'e Apache clans – the “People of the Yellow Speckled Water”, was created in 1972 within the Tonto National Forest northeast of Phoenix. It consists of 85 acres (344,000 m^{2}). With the smallest land base of any reservation in the state of Arizona, it serves about 100 tribal members of the 140 total; 110 are enrolled tribal members. The reservation is located adjacent to the town of Payson, in northwestern Gila County, approximately 95 miles northeast of Phoenix and 100 miles southeast of Flagstaff.

The Tonto Apache are the direct descendants of the Dilzhe'e Apache who lived in the Payson vicinity long before the arrival of Europeans. During the first reservation era, they were moved to the large Rio Verde Reserve, near Camp Verde, which was established in 1871 for the Tonto and Wipukepa (Northeastern Yavapai). The U.S. federal government dissolved the reservation in 1875 and forced the people to relocate to the San Carlos Reservation. After 20 years of exile, some Tonto Apache gradually returned to Payson only to find white settlers had taken much of their land. Today, legislation is pending to provide them with trust title to the land on which they reside. The majority of the Tonto Apache, however, had decided to return together with their Yavapai allies and relatives to the Camp Verde Reservation to form the Yavapai-Apache Nation of today.

=== Western Apache Indian Reservations ===
Because of their forced relocation in 1875, today some Tonto Apache live in two reserves dominated by other Western Apache groups, the San Carlos Apache Indian Reservation and Fort Apache Indian Reservation.

== Sociopolitical organization ==
Like the other Western Apache groups, the Tonto Apache were not centrally organized. The smallest social unit was the matrilocal and matrilineal family living in one wickiup (kowa or gowa); each wife lived with her children in a separate wickiup. Some kindred families lived together as an extended family (so-called gotah) in a rancheria together. Several gotah (extended families) formed local groups. Together, these claimed hunting and gathering areas. The highest organizational unit was the group or band, which are usually composed of several smaller local groups; it was organized mostly for military purposes and for common defense. (Band organization was strongest in Chiricahua society). The Tonto Apache were divided into the following bands:

Northern Tonto (inhabited the upper reaches of the Verde River and ranged north toward the San Francisco Mountains north of Flagstaff, because they shared hunting and gathering grounds with Wi:pukba/Wipukepaya bands of the Yavapai they formed bilingual mixed-tribal Northern Tonto Apache-Wi:pukba/Wipukepaya bands with common headmen, both the band/local group or its headman usually had two names, one was Apache (Southern Athabascan) the other Yavapai (Upland Yuman).)

- Bald Mountain band, in Apache: Dasziné Dasdaayé Indee (‘Porcupine Sitting Above People’) or in Yavapai: Wiipukepaya local group (′Oak Creek Canyon People′); in English often known as Bald Mountain band (Apache)or as Oak Creek Canyon band (Yavapai). Lived mainly around Bald Mountain or Squaw Peak, on the west side of the Verde Valley, southwest of Camp Verde. They lived entirely by hunting and gathering plant foods.
- Oak Creek band, in Apache: Tsé Hichii Indee (‘Horizontal Red Rock People’) or in Yavapai: Wiipukepaya local group (′Oak Creek Canyon People′); in English often known as Oak Creek band (Apache) or as Oak Creek Canyon band (Yavapai). Lived near today´s Sedona, along Oak Creek, Dry Beaver Creek, Wet Beaver Creek and southward to the west side of the Verde River between Altnan and West Clear Creek, eastward to Stoneman's and Mary's Lakes, and northward to Roger's Lake and Flagstaff.
- Fossil Creek band, in Apache: Tú Dotłʼizh Indee ('Blue Water People, i.e. Fossil Creek People') or in Yavapai Matkitwawipa band (′People of the Upper Verde River Valley (in Yavapai: Matkʼamvaha)′) Lived along and had a few tiny farms on Fossil Creek, Clear Creek and-a site on the Verde River below the mouth of Deer Creek, they hunted and gathered west of the Verde River, northwest to the Oak Creek band territory and northeast to Apache Maid Mountain.
- Mormon Lake band, in Apache: Dotłʼizhi HaʼitʼIndee (‘Turquoise Road Coming Up People’) Lived east of Mormon Lake near the head of Anderson's Canyon and ranged up to the southern foot of the San Francisco Mountains, at Elden Mountain near Flagstaff, around Mormon, Mary's, Stoneman's and Hay Lakes, and at Anderson and Padre Canyons. Because they were exposed to the hostile Navajo on the north and east, they depended entirely on hunting and gathering wild plant foods for sustenance.

Southern Tonto (lived in the Tonto Basin from the Salt River in south northward along and over the East Verde River, including the Sierra Ancha, Bradshaw Mountains and Mazatzal Mountains – like the Northern Tonto Apache with the Wi:pukba/Wipukepaya – they formed with the Guwevkabaya/Kwevkepaya bands of Yavapai bilingual mixed-tribal Southern Tonto Apache-Guwevkabaya/Kwevkepaya bands with common headmen.)

- Mazatzal band, in Apache: Tsé Nołtłʼizhn (‘Rocks in a Line of Greenness People’) or in Yavapai by two names: Hakayopa clan or Hichapulvapa clan Lived mainly in the eastern slopes of Mazatzal Mountains.
  - Tsé Nołtłʼizhn' (Apache name) or in Yavapai: Hakayopa clan (‚Cottonwood People‘); in English simply known as Mazatzal band (Apache). Claimed the area around the community Sunflower Valley, the Mazatzal Mountains south of its highest peak, Mazatzal Peak (2.409 m), and to the east in the area around the former Fort Camp Camp Reno in the western Tonto Basin (also called Pleasant Valley).
  - Tsé Nołtłʼizhn' (Apache name) or in Yavapai: Hichapulvapa clan (‚bunch-of-wood-sticking-up People‘); in English simply known as Mazatzal band (Apache). They claimed the Mazatzal Mountains southward from East Verde River and westward from North Peak to Mazatzal Peak.
- Dil Zhęʼé semi-band, in Apache: Dilzhę́’é, Dil Zhe`é (‘People with high-pitched voices’) or in Yavapai: Matkawatapa clan (‚red-strata-country People, i.e. Sierra Ancha People‘) The Dil Zhęʼé semi-band are the first and most important semi-band under which name the five remaining semi-bands were known, some Dil Zhęʼé of Sierra Ancha formed with members of the Walkamepa band a bilingual unit known to its Yavapai-speaking members as Matkawatapa.

== Tonto Apache chiefs ==
Tonto leader (bilingual Kwevkepaya-Tonto-Apache or Kwevkepaya-Pinaleno-Apache leader)

- Delshay (Delshe, Delchea, Delacha - ‘Big Rump’, in Yavapai Wah-poo-eta or Wapotehe, Kwevkepaya-Tonto-Apache leader, his bilingual mixed band of the Matkawatapa local group of the Walkamepa-Kwevkepaya and Southern Tonto-Apache with about 200 members lived in the Sierra Ancha with their western limit forming the Tonto Creek and in the east Cherry Creek, but often they were reported living in the Mazatzal Mountains west of their core range, not to be confused with Wah-poo-eta, * about 1835; was involved in the killing of Lt. Jacob Almy at San Carlos in 1873 and fled after the murder along with Chuntz, Cochinay, and Chan-deisi into the wilderness, was tracked down by Apache scouts under Desalin and killed on 29. July 1874, his head together with 76 captured Kwevkepaya-Tonto were brought in Camp McDowell)
- Wah-poo-eta (Wapotehe, Wapooita - ‘Big Rump’, in Apache Delacha or Delshe, Kwevkepaya-Tonto-Apache leader, about 750 band members, mostly Kwevkepaya and some Southern Tonto-Apache of the Mazatzal band, his band living in the southern Mazatzal Mountains was known to be the largest and fiercest band, because he refused to make peace with the Americans little is known about him, not to be confused with Delshay, *?; killed † 15. August 1869 by a band of 44 Maricopa and Akimel O'odham under the Maricopa war leader Juan Chivaria in Castle Creek Canyon)
- Eschetlepan (Chalipun, Cha-Thle-Pah, Choltepun, called by the US Army Charlie Pan, Kwevkepaya-Tonto-Apache leader, was himself a Southern Tonto-Apache of the Mazatzal band, his band consisted mostly of Wikedjasapa-Kwevkepaya, his Apache following belonged to the Mazatzal and four of the six semi-bands of the Southern Tonto, his band of about 100 people lived southwest of Green Valley and south of the East Verde River, about ten miles east of the Verde River into the northern slopes of the Mazatzal Mountains, therefore they could easily raid in the Prescott and Wickenburg areas)
- Ashcavotil (Ascavotil, in Apache Escavotil, Kwevkepaya-Pinaleno-Apache leader, his band of about 200 warriors was living east of Cherry Creek southward along both sides of the Salt River and in the Pinaleno Mountains, next to Wah-poo-eta he was the most warlike leader in central Arizona, heavily armed and well supplied with ammunition from Apache on the Fort Goodwin reservation, his warriors raided and warred as far south as Tucson, Sacaton and Camp Grant)
- Oshkolte (Hascalté, Has-Kay-Ah-Yol-Tel, Tonto-Apache-Kwevkepaya leader, to his band belonged 70 warriors, 20 women and 20 children, his band – made up mostly of Southern Tonto-Apache and some Kwevkepaya – ranged on both sides of the Tonto Creek north to the East Verde River and south to the Salt River, close ally of Ashcavotil and Wah-poo-eta, his warriors were well armed but depended on Ashcavotil and Wah-poo-eta for ammunition, lived east of the Four Peaks in the Mazatzal Mountains towards the Salt River, killed † March 1873)
- Nanni-chaddi (Tonto-Apache-Kwevkepaya leader, *?; was responsible for many raids on Akimel O'Odham and white settlements along the Salt and Gila River, killed † 28. December 1872 in the Battle of Salt River Canyon, also called Skeleton Cave Massacre, 130 troopers from the 5th Cavalry Regiment led by Captain William H. Brown and 30 Indian Scouts, killed 76 men, women and children, 15 more were dying, only 18 women and 6 children survived and were taken into captivity)
- Skiitlanoyah (Skitianoyah, in Yavapai Skitlavisyah, Kwevkepaya-Tonto-Apache leader, his mixed band of about 80 people resided north of Delshay's band between the middle East Verde River and the upper Tonto Creek north to the Mogollon Rim)
- Piyahgonte (Pi-yah-gon-te, Yavapai-Tonto-Apache leader in the 1860s and 1870s, with his band of about 75 people he was living along both sides of the upper East Verde River north to the Mogollon Rim, he was believed to be responsible for most of the depredations around Prescott)
- Natatotel (Natokel or Notokel, Kwevkepaya-Tonto-Apache leader, killed † June 1873)

Tonto-Apache leader

- Chuntz (Chunz, Tonto Apache leader, fled after the San Carlos outbreak in 1873 along with Delshay, Cochinay, and Chan-deisi into the wilderness, was tracked down and killed in July 1874 in the Santa Catalina Mountains by Apache scouts under Tonto Apache (or White Mountain?) leader Desalin, his head with six of his last supporters were brought into San Carlos on 25. July 1874 and displayed for several days on the parade ground)
- Chan-deisi (‘Broken Nose’, also known as She-shet, called by George Crook John Daisy, Tonto Apache leader, was a discharged scout who belonged to Cochinay's band, fled after the murder of Lt. Jacob Almy at San Carlos in 1873 along with Chuntz, Cochinay, and Delshay into the wilderness, killed on 12. June 1874 by Indian scouts, decapitated and his head was brought into Camp Apache)
- Cochinay (‘Yellow Thunder’, Tonto Apache leader, fled after the murder of Lt. Jacob Almy at San Carlos in 1873 along with Chuntz, Delshay, and Chan-deisi into the wilderness, was caught and killed by Indian scouts in the latter part of May 1874, decapitated and his head was brought into San Carlos on 26. May 1874)
- Naqui-Naquis (Tonto Apache leader, killed † June 1873)
- Ba-coon (Bacon or Bocan – “Big Mouth”, also called Eskimo-tzin, Esqinosquin or Esquimosquin, Tonto Apache leader and later Apache Scout, †1874)

== See also ==
- Western Apache
- Yavapai-Apache Nation
- Southern Athabaskan languages
