= Western Apache people =

Native American ethnic group

Seal of the San Carlos Apache tribe

The Western Apache are an Indigenous people of North America, and a subgroup of Apache peoples. They live primarily in east central Arizona, in the United States and north of Mexico in the states of Sonora and Chihuahua.

Most live within reservations in Arizona. The Fort Apache Indian Reservation, San Carlos Apache Indian Reservation, Yavapai-Apache Nation, Tonto Apache Reservation, and the Fort McDowell Yavapai Nation are home to the majority of Western Apache and are the bases of their federally recognized tribes.

The Western Apache bands call themselves Ndee (Indé), meaning 'The People' in the Western Apache language. Because of dialectical differences, the Pinaleño/Pinal and Arivaipa/Aravaipa bands of the San Carlos Apache pronounce the word as Innee or Nnēē:.

== Language and culture ==
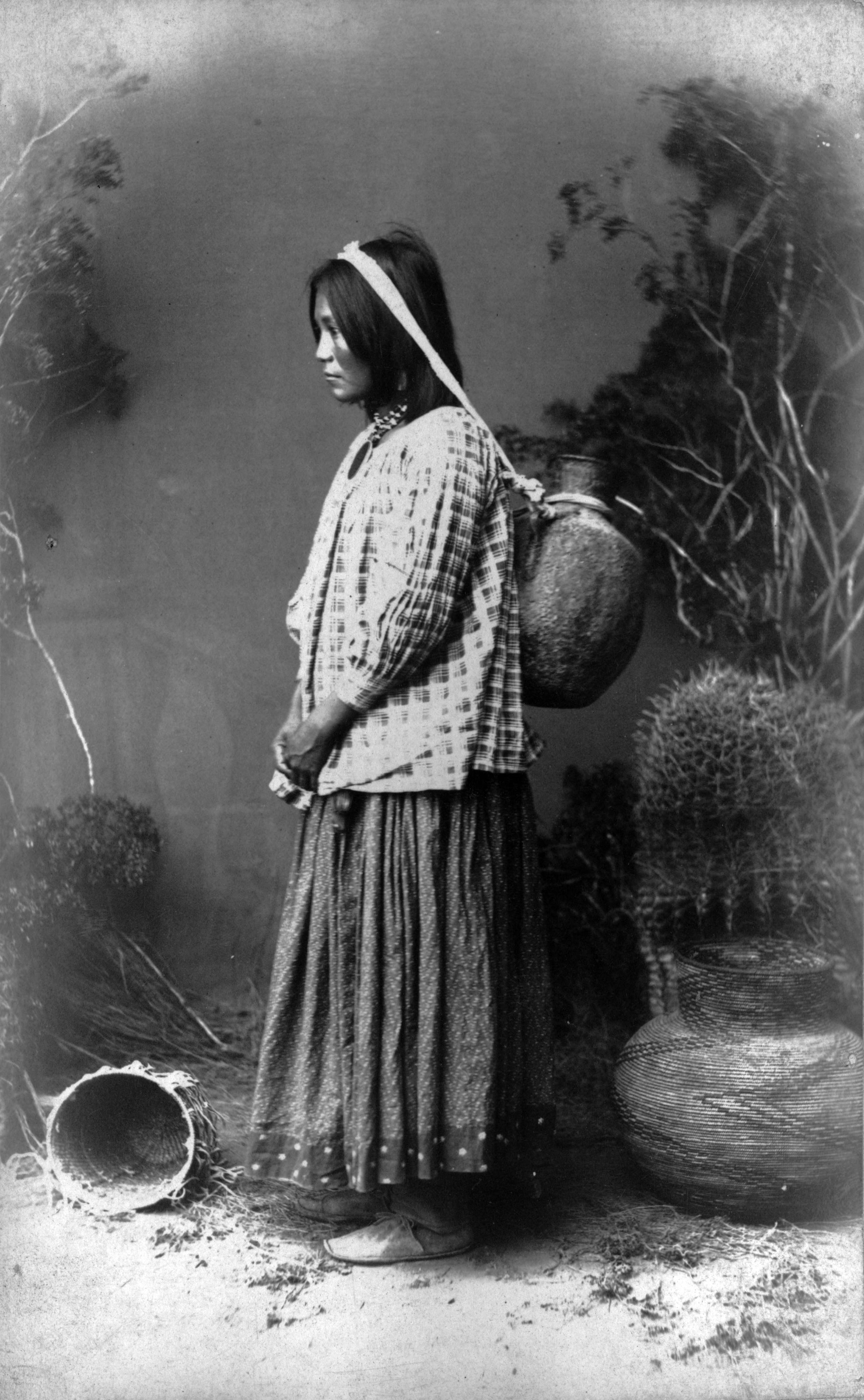
San Carlos Apache woman, c. 1883–1887, photographed by Randall, A. Frank

The various dialects of Western Apache (which they refer to as Ndéé biyáti’ / Nnéé biyáti’) are a form of Apachean, a branch of the Southern Athabaskan language family. The Navajo speak a related Apachean language, but the peoples separated several hundred years ago and are considered culturally distinct. Other Indigenous peoples who speak Athabaskan languages are located in Alaska and Canada.

The anthropologist Grenville Goodwin classified the Western Apache into five groups based on Apachean dialect and culture:

- Cibecue,
- Northern Tonto,
- Southern Tonto,
- San Carlos, and
- White Mountain.

Since Goodwin, other researchers have disputed his conclusion of five linguistic groups. They do agree that there are three main Apachean dialects, with several sub-groupings:

- San Carlos,
- White Mountain, and
- Dilzhę́’é (Tonto).

Some 14,000 Western Apache still speak their Western Apache language, and the tribes are working to preserve it. Bilingual teachers are often employed in the lower elementary grades to promote that goal, but many children tend to learn to speak only the widely spoken English, mingled with occasional Spanish, depending on their home languages.

In relation to culture, tribal schools offer classes in Native handicrafts, such as basket weaving; making bows, arrows, spears, shields; and cradles for infants. Girls and young women at the elementary and secondary level are taught how to make native regalia from buckskin, in addition to making silver jewelry. In addition, young men often become jewelry makers and are taught skills in this area.

== Western Apache bands and tribes ==
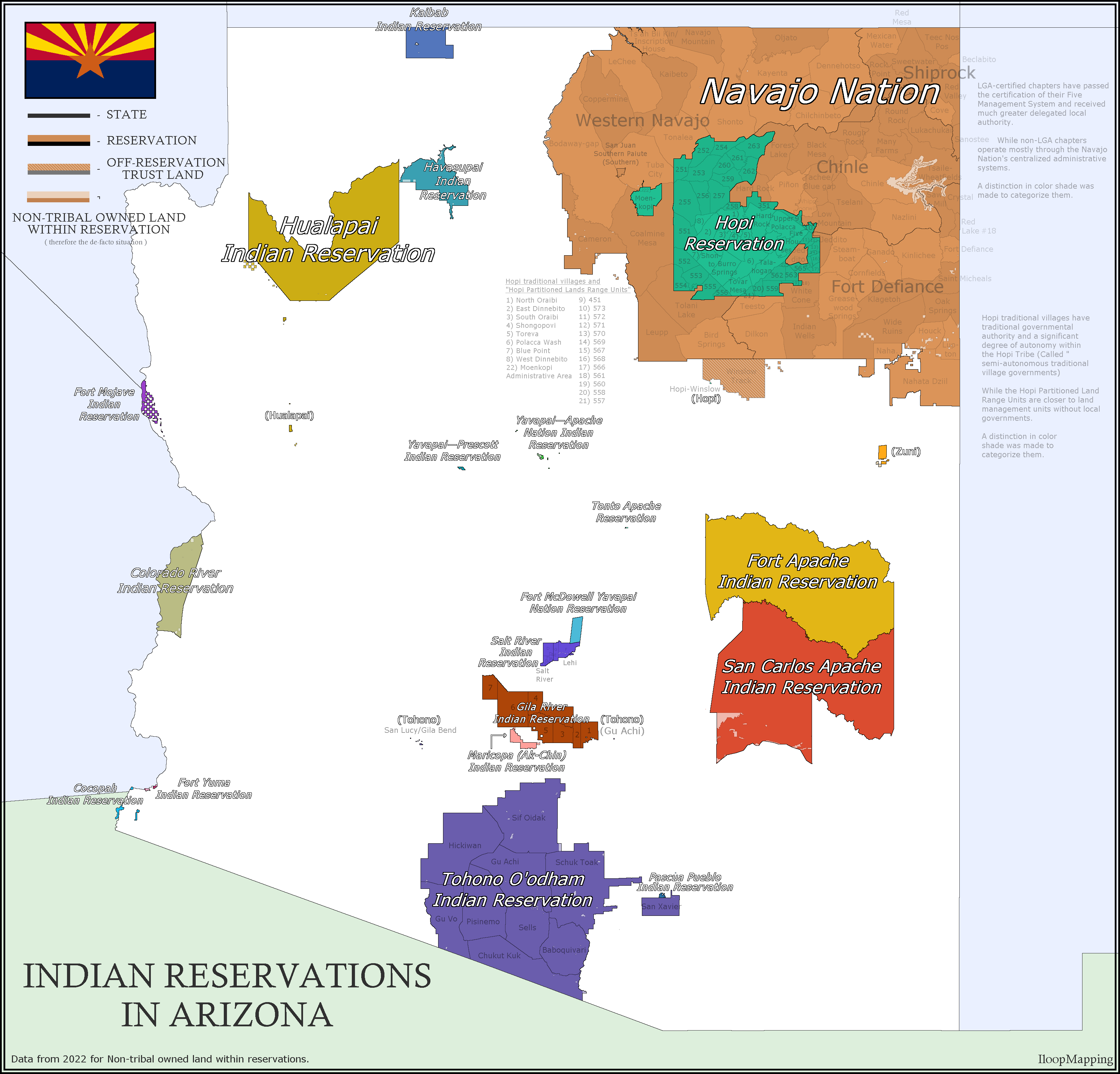
Map of Apache Tribes in Arizona and neighboring tribes.

=== White Mountain Apache ===
The White Mountain Apache or Dził Łigai Si’án Ndéé "People of the White Mountains" (Spanish: Sierra Blanca Apache'), are centered in Fort Apache Indian Reservation. It is the most eastern band of the Western Apache group. The White Mountain Apache are a federally recognized tribe. Their traditional area ranged from the White Mountains near present-day Snowflake, Arizona, the Little Colorado River in the north over the Gila Mountains south to the Pinaleno Mountains near Safford (Ichʼįʼ Nahiłtį́į́)) and parts of Chihuahua and Sonora, Mexico. They lived near waterways, which they used for their crops, such as along the East Fork and North Fork of the White River, Willow Creek, Black River and the Gila River.

- Western White Mountain band (Łį́nabaahé, Łį́nabaahá – “Many Go to War People”, literally, “they scout with horses,” often called Coyoteros or Coyotero Apaches)
- Eastern White Mountain band (Dziłghą́ʼé or Dziłghą’á – “On Top of Mountains People”)
  - Dził Nchaa Si’án (“Big Seated Mountain People”, i.e. “People of Mount Graham”)
  - Today it includes the Tséé hachíídn or Cháchíídn (“Red Rock Strata People”, a group of chief Pedro's Carrizo band of the Cibecue Apaches, who were not forced to move to San Carlos in 1875.

=== Cibecue Apache ===
(Spanish derivation of the autonym of the Apache living in the Cibecue Creek Valley and Salt River Canyon known to them as Dishchíí Bikoh, Dishchíí Bikoh, or Dishchííkoh – “Horizontally Red Canyon” or “Red Ridge Valley”, therefore the Apache living there were called Dishchíí Bikoh N’déé, Dishchíídn – “Horizontally Red Canyon People” – sometimes shortened to “People of the Red Canyon” or “Red Canyon People”, possibly of Navajo/Zuni ancestry, ranged north of the Salt River to well above the Mogollon Rim between Cherry Creek in the west to Cedar Creek in the east – sometimes they were found even further west on Tonto Creek, in the Sierra Ancha and the Mazatzal Mountains considered to be Southern Tonto Apache land), today all part of the federally recognized tribe of the White Mountain Apache of the Fort Apache Reservation

- Canyon Creek band (Gołkizhn – “Spotted on Top People” or “Marked on The Ground People”, likely refers to a mountain that is spotted with junipers, lived along Canyon Creek, a tributary of the Salt River in the Mogollon Rim area, western band of the Cibecue Apache with five local groups)
- Carrizo band (Tł’ohk’aa hagain, Tł’ohk’aa digaidn Bikoh N’déé – “White Arrowgrass Goes Up People” or “Canyon of the Row of White Canes People”, lived along Carrizo Creek, a tributary of the Salt River, eastern band of the Cibecue Apache with four local groups)
- Cibecue band (Dziłt’aadn, Ts’iłt’aadn, or Dziłtaadn – “Base of Mountain People/Foot of the Mountain People”, lived along Cibecue Creek, a tributary of the Salt River, middle or central band of the Cibecue Apache with four local groups)

=== San Carlos Apache of the San Carlos Reservation ===
(Tsék’āādn – “Metate Stone People”, lived on both sides of the San Pedro River and in the foothills of the Santa Catalina Mountains near Tucson), a federally recognized tribe composed of the San Carlos Apache proper and several groups of the Cibecue Apache (excluding the Tsēē Hachīīdn (“Red Rock Strata People”) clan of the Carrizo band), some Tonto Apache, Lipan as well Chiricahua Apache peoples.

- Apache Peaks band (Nadah doo Golniihé – “Spoiled Mescal People”, “Tasteless Mescal People”, also called Bích’iltł’éhé Nṉēē – “Fled to the Mountains People”, lived northeast of Globe between the Salt River and the Apache Peaks as far east as Íshįįhyú (“Salt”) on the Salt River, between Cibicue Creek mouth and Canyon Creek mouths)
- San Carlos band (Tsandee Dotʼán – ‘It is Placed Alone beside the Fire People’, often simply called Tsék’āādn – “Metate People”, or San Carlos proper, also called T’iiszhaazhé Bikoh – “Small Cottonwood Canyon People”, lived and farmed along the San Carlos River, a tributary of the Gila River)
- Pinaleño/Pinal band (Spanish ‘Pinery People’, T’iis Sibaan, T’iisibaan, or T’iisebán – “Edge of Cottonwood People”, “Cottonwoods in Gray Wedge Shape People”, named after the trees at the mouth of the San Pedro River and their farms along Pinal Creek called T’iisébaa, lived from the Mescal Mountains (Nadahchoh Das’án – “Big Mescal Sitting There”) in the west to the northern edge of the Apache Peaks in the east, northward across the Salt River and in the north and eastern parts of the Pinaleno Mountains (Pinal Mountains, in Apache: Dził Ndilchí’ Biyílé – “pine-burdened mountain”, in Yavapai: Walkame – “pine mountains”) southeast toward the Gila River, together with their allies, the Hwaalkamvepaya/Walkamepa Band ("Pine Mountains People") of Guwevkabaya-Yavapai and their Arivaipa kin they hunted and camped in the Dripping Springs Mountains to the southwest, lived generally north of the Arivaipa band)
  - first Pinaleño/Pinal Apache local group or Hwaalkamvepaya/Walkamepa Guwevkabaya-Yavapai clan ("actual" or "real" Walkamepa clan) lived as bilingual group in the southern and western Pinal Mountains, also known in English as "Pinaleño/Pinal Apache Band" of the San Carlos Apache (in Apache: T’iisibaan or T’iisebán).
  - second Pinaleño/Pinal Apache local group or Ilihasitumapa Guwevkabaya-Yavapai clan ("wood-sticking-out-of-middle-of-water People") (lived as bilingual group in the northern Pinaleno Mountains, therefore also known in English as "Pinaleño/Pinal Apache Band" of the San Carlos Apache.)
- Arivaipa/Aravaipa band (Pima: ‘cowards, ‘women’, called by the Apaches Tsēē ch’éheshjiné, Tséch’isjiné, Tséjiné, or Tsézhiné – “Dark Rocks People” or “Black Rocks People”, after a well known spot of black rocks around Bassett Peak (Dził Naz’aayú – “Mountain That Sits Here and There”) of the Galiuro Mountains, their range encompassed the Aravaipa Creek Valley, the Galiuro Mountains, the Santa Teresa Mountains, Santa Catalina Mountains und Rincon Mountains (Itah Gos’án – “Sits Close Together”) and the southern edge of the Pinaleno Mountains, together with their Hwaalkamvepaya/Walkamepa Band ("Pine Mountains People") of Guwevkabaya-Yavapai allies and their Pinaleño/Pinal kin they hunted and camped in the Dripping Springs Mountains to the northwest)
  - Tsézhiné or Tséjiné – “Dark Rocks People” or “Black Rocks People”, Aravaipa proper, because they outnumbered the Tsēē Bénast’i’é “Wrapped Around the Rocks People” their name was used for all Aravaipa.
  - Tsēē Bénast’i’é – “Wrapped Around the Rocks People” or “Surrounded by Rocks People”
  - Dziłdlaazhé or Ch’ishdlaazhé (“Mount Turnbull Apache”) or further Hwaalkamvepaya/Walkamepa Guwevkabaya-Yavapai clan (Yavapai name not known) (lived as bilingual group in the Santa Teresa Mountains including Mount Turnbull, in English most widely known as “Aravaipa Apache clan” of the San Carlos Apache.)

=== Tonto Apache ===
The Tonto Apache's autonym is Dilzhę́`é. Historically, they lived from the San Francisco Peaks, East Verde River and Oak Creek Canyon along the Verde River into the Mazatzal Mountains and to the Salt River in the SW and the Tonto Basin in the SE, extending eastward toward the Little Colorado River. They are the most westerly group of the Western Apache and primarily live in Arizona.

The Chiricahua called them Ben-et-dine – ‘wild’, ‘crazy’; neighboring Western Apache called them Koun`nde – ‘Those who you don’t understand’, ‘wild rough People’. The Spanish adapted the latter term, referring to the people as Tonto –meaning 'loose', 'foolish' in Spanish. The Dine called the Tonto Apache and neighboring Yavapai Dilzhʼíʼ dinéʼiʼ – ‘People with high-pitched voices’, distinguishing them by language.

- Northern Tonto or Tonto, inhabited the upper reaches of the Verde River and ranged north toward the San Francisco Mountains north of Flagstaff. Because they shared hunting and gathering grounds with Wi:pukba/Wipukepaya bands of the Yavapai, they formed bilingual mixed-tribal bands with common headmen. Both the band/local group or its headman usually were given two names: one was Apache (Southern Athabascan) and the other Yavapai (Upland Yuman).
  - Bald Mountain band (a bilingual, mixed Apache-Yavapai band known in Apache as: Dahszíné Dahsdáyé Iṉéé – ‘Porcupine Sitting Above People’, and in Yavapai: Wiipukepaya, meaning ′Oak Creek Canyon People′. In English they were often known as the "Bald Mountain band" (with focus on the Apache) or as "Oak Creek Canyon band" (with focus on the Yavapai). They lived mainly around Bald Mountain or Squaw Peak, on the west side of the Verde Valley, southwest of Camp Verde. They lived entirely by hunting and gathering plant foods.
  - Oak Creek band (a bilingual mixed Apache-Yavapai band with two names: in Apache: Tséé Hichíí Nṉéé – ‘Horizontal Red Rock People’ and in Yavapai: Wiipukepaya local group – ′Oak Creek Canyon People′; in English often known as "Oak Creek band" (Apache) or as "Oak Creek Canyon band" (Yavapai). Lived near today's Sedona, along Oak Creek, Dry Beaver Creek, Wet Beaver Creek and southward to the west side of the Verde River between Altnan and West Clear Creek, eastward to Stoneman's and Mary's Lakes, and northward to Roger's Lake and Flagstaff.
  - Fossil Creek band (a bilingual mixed Apache-Yavapai band with two names: in Apache: Tú Dotłʼizh Nṉéé – ‘Blue Water People, i.e. Fossil Creek People’ and in Yavapai: Matkitwawipa band – ′People of the Upper Verde River Valley (in Yavapai: Matkʼamvaha)′). Lived along and had a few tiny farms on Fossil Creek, Clear Creek and a site on the Verde River below the mouth of Deer Creek, they hunted and gathered west of the Verde River, northwest to the Oak Creek band territory and northeast to Apache Maid Mountain.
  - Mormon Lake band (in Apache: Dotłʼizhi HaʼitʼInṉéé – ‘Turquoise Road Coming Up People’) Lived east of Mormon Lake near the head of Anderson's Canyon and ranged up to the southern foot of the San Francisco Mountains, at Elden Mountain near Flagstaff, around Mormon, Mary's, Stoneman's and Hay Lakes, and at Anderson and Padre Canyons. Because they were exposed to the hostile Navajo on the north and east, they depended entirely on hunting and gathering wild plant foods for sustenance. Only the Mormon Lake band was composed entirely of Tonto Apache.
- Southern Tonto or Dilzhę́’é (lived in the Tonto Basin from the Salt River in south northward along and over the East Verde River, including the Sierra Ancha (Dził Nteel – "Wide Flat Mountain"), Bradshaw Mountains and Mazatzal Mountains – like the Northern Tonto Apache with the Wi:pukba/Wipukepaya – they formed with the Guwevkabaya/Kwevkepaya bands of Yavapai bilingual mixed-tribal bands with common headmen.)
  - Mazatzal band (a bilingual mixed Apache-Yavapai band with two names and broken up in two local groups of the "Tséé Nołtłʼizhń Band" (‘Rocks in a Line of Greenness People’) of Southern Tonto Apache and the "Wiikchasapaya/Wikedjasapa Band" (′People of the McDowell Mountains (in Yavapai: Wi:kajasa)′) of Guwevkabaya/Kwevkepaya Yavapai). Lived mainly in the eastern slopes of Mazatzal Mountains and eastwards on both sides of Tonto Creek down where Theodore Roosevelt Lake now is.
    - Tséé Nołtłʼizhń (Apache name) or Hakayopa clan (Cottonwood People, Yavapai name); in English simply known as "Mazatzal band" (Apache). Claimed the area around the community Sunflower Valley, the Mazatzal Mountains south of its highest peak, Mazatzal Peak (2.409 m), and to the east in the area around the former Fort Camp Reno in the western Tonto Basin (also called Pleasant Valley).
    - Tsé Nołtłʼizhń (Apache name) or Hichapulvapa clan (‘bunch-of-wood-sticking-up People‘, Yavapai name); in English simply known as "Mazatzal band" (Apache). They claimed the Mazatzal Mountains southward from East Verde River and westward from North Peak to Mazatzal Peak.
  - Dilzhę́ʼé semi-band (a bilingual mixed Apache-Yavapai group with two names: in Apache: Dilzhę́’é or Dilzę́`é – ‘People with high-pitched voices’ and in Yavapai: Matkawatapa clan (‚red-strata-country People, i.e. Sierra Ancha People‘). The Dilzhę́ʼé semi-band are the first and most important semi-band under which name the five remaining semi-bands were known, those Dilzhę́ʼé of Sierra Ancha formed with members of the Walkamepa band a bilingual unit).
    - second semi-band (lived along Tonto Creek and Rye Creek in the Gisela area, south of the third/Payson semi-band and northeast of the Mazatzal band).
    - third semi-band (perhaps one of the principal Dilzhę́ʼé Apache clans – the "People of the Yellow Speckled Water", their territory encompassed the Tonto Apache Reservation, they were living in the Round Valley–Payson area known in Apache as Tégótsog ("Place of the Yellow Water" or "Place of the Yellow Land").
    - fourth semi-band (lived near the confluence of the East Verde with the Verde River, most south of the East Verde between the territories of the Guwevkabaya-Yavapai southwest and Mazatzal band south, the second/Gisela semi-band to the east, and the third/Payson semi-band to the northeast, and the fifth/Pine semi-band north).
    - fifth semi-band (lived along the East Verde River north and along Pine Creek in Strawberry and Pine valleys, a tributary of Tonto Creek, in the Pine area).
    - sixth semi-band.

=== Other bands and groups ===
Often groups of Wi:pukba (Wipukepa) and Guwevkabaya (Kwevkepaya) of the Yavapai lived together with the Tonto Apache (as well as bands of the San Carlos Apache) in bilingual rancherias, and could not be distinguished by outsiders (Spaniards, Americans, or Mexicans) except on the basis of their first language. The Yavapai and Apache together were often referred to as Tonto or Tonto Apaches. Therefore, it is not always easy to find out whether it is now exclusively dealing with Yavapai or Apache, or those mixed bands. The Wi:pukba (Wipukepa) and Guwevkabaya (Kwevkepaya) were therefore, because of their ancestral and cultural proximity to the Tonto and San Carlos Apaches, often incorrectly called Yavapai Apaches or Yuma Apaches. The Ɖo:lkabaya (Tolkepaya), the southwestern group of Yavapai, and the Hualapai (also belonging to the Upland Yuma Peoples) were also referred as Yuma Apaches or Mohave Apaches.

== Notable Western Apache ==
=== White Mountain Apaches ===
- Alchesay (aka William Alchesay and Áłchʼísé – "The Little One", May 17, 1853 – Aug.6, 1928) was a chief of the White Mountain Apache and an Apache Scout. He received United States militaries highest decoration for bravery, the Medal of Honor for his actions during the Apache Wars and the Yavapai Wars. He tried to convince Geronimo to surrender peacefully. Became later a prominent stockman, made several trips to Washington, D.C., and was active in Indian affairs.
- Bylas (aka Bailish or Baylas – "One Who Does All the Talking") chief of the Eastern White Mountain band, for whom the present settlement of Bylas on the San Carlos Reservation is named, this Apache settlement is divided into two communities, one of the White Mountain, the other of San Carlos and Southern Tonto Apache.
- Francisco *Indian name (Gochaahá = Big One) killed 11/10 – 1865, chief of the Eastern White Mountain Coyotero Apache band, maybe he had been in his childhood a Mexican captive and thus inherited his Spanish name or he is to be identified with Na-ginit-a ("He Scouts Ahead"), an Eastern White Mountain chief closely engaged with Chiricahua chief Cochise – both Francisco and Na-ginit-a being killed by venom in 1865 at Camp Goodwin – arrested because of his involvement in the Cienega massacre and "executed" in unclear circumstances.
- Esh-kel-dah-sila (Eskiltesela, Esketeshelaw, Hashkéédásiláá – “He Is Constantly Angry”, Heske-hldasila – “Angry, Right Side Up”, also known as Clear-Eyed Eskeltesela, fl. c. 1850–1875) chief of the Nádots’osn clan (Nádohots’osn, Náhodits’osn, or Nádots’osin – “slender peak standing up people”) as of the entire Eastern White Mountain Apache band, most respected and prominent Eastern White Mountain Apache chief in history, he maintained alliances with Hopi and Zuni, offered land for the establishment of Camp Apache (later Fort Apache), Pedro and his Carrizo band of Cibecue Apaches got permission from him to settle near later Fort Apache on White Mountain Apache territory, he and his band were generally ill-disposed toward Cibecue Apache bands of Miguel, Diablo and Pedro, who had enlisted as Apache Scouts in 1871 and were scouting against “troublemakers” of Esh-kel-dah-sila's band.
- Polone, succeeded in 1873 Esh-kel-dah-sila as chief of the Eastern White Mountain Apache band.

=== Cibecue Apache ===
- Miguel (also known as One-Eyed-Miguel or El Tuerto, Esh-ke-iba, Es-chá´-pa, Es-ca-pa or Hashkééba – "Aware of His Anger", sometimes called Pin-dah-kiss, ca. ? – †1871) chief of the dominant local group and clan of the Carrizo band, during the 1850s and 1860s most prominent Carrizo chief, in 1869 Miguel and his younger brother Diablo initiated relations between Americans and the Cibecue and White Mountain Apaches, which led to the establishment of Fort Apache (first as Camp Apache in 1870). He supplied recruits for the first unit of Apache Scouts in 1871, because the Cibecue Apaches were forced to settle near Camp Apache on White Mountain Apache territory in spring 1874, he was killed shortly after during a feud with White Mountain Apaches, after that, Diablo took over leadership from his deceased older brother and avenged his death.
- Diablo (El Diablo – "the Devil" or Capitan Grande, Hashkéédásiláá (hash-kay-dah-si-laa) – “His Anger is Lying Side By Side”, c. 1846 – †30. Aug.1880) after the death of his older brother Chief Miguel in 1874 during a feud with the White Mountain Apaches, he became the most prominent chief of the Carrizo band, in the fall of 1874 he enlisted as Scout and was promoted to sergeant, in January 1876 he and his band together with other Cibecue Apache bands were forced to move onto the San Carlos Apache Indian Reservation, only Pedro's band was allowed to stay at Fort Apache – which led to ill feelings towards the latter, therefore Diablo's band attacked on August 30, 1880, Pedro's band near Fort Apache, which resulted in the killing of Diablo himself, not to be confused with Hashkéédásiláá, the most prominent Eastern White Mountain Apache chief at this time.
- Pedro (Hashkéé-yánáłtiʼi-dn, Hash-kay-ya-nal-ti-din – “Angry, He Ask for It”, also known as Pedro, the Imitator, ca. 1835 – †1885) chief of the Tséé hachíídn clan (“Red Rock Strata People”) and local group of the Carrizo band, during a clan dispute in the early 1850s he was driven off the Carrizo Creek by Miguel, was allowed by the great Eastern White Mountain Apache chief Hashkéédásiláá after two years to settle near Fort Apache, Pedro's band intermarried with the White Mountain Apaches and were therefore classed as White Mountain Apaches, however they retained close clan ties with the Carrizo band of the Cibecue Apaches, he and his segundo (or war chief) Yclenny together with White Mountain Apache chiefs Alchesay and Petone killed August 30, 1880 Diablo, (oft mistaken for Hashkéédásiláá, the most prominent Eastern White Mountain Apache chief at this time) in selfdefense, in revenge for the death of Diablo he was shot through both knees but survived, only Petone was mortally wounded, was a constant friend of the Americans.
- Petone succeeded his father Pedro about 1873 as chief of the Carrizo band of Cibecue Apaches – now generally classed as White Mountain Apaches. He was involved in the murder of the influential Carrizo band chief Diablo on August 30, 1880, half a year later in February 1881 members of Diablo's band would avenge his death. In this battle, Pedro was shot through both knees and Alchesay through the chest, both of them survived, but Petone was mortally wounded.
- Capitán Chiquito (also known as Captain Chiquito, Chief of the Cibecue band, not to be confused with the Pinaleño Apache Chief of the same name)
- Nock-ay-dot-klin-ne (Nakąįdotł’ini – “spotted or freckled Mexican”, called by the Whites Babbyduclone, Barbudeclenny, Bobby-dok-linny and Freckled Mexican Matthews) chief of the Cañon Creek band and a respected medicine man among his people, held dances and claimed to bring two dead chiefs, the Carrizo band chief Diablo and the Cibecue band chief Es-ki-ol-e to life, fearing an Apache uprising the Army tried to arrest the medicine man which led to the Battle of Cibecue Creek on Aug.30, 1881, after the fighting erupted the Apache scouts mutinied as suspected. The attacking Apaches fought mainly at rifle range, however, when the scouts turned against the soldiers, a brief close range engagement occurred. As the battle ended with a strategic Apache victory, despite their inability to rescue their leader, due to the soldiers retreat. After the battle, the American army buried six soldiers, Nakąįdotł’ini, his wife, and young son, who was killed while riding into battle on his father's pony. The Cibecue affair touched off a regional Apache uprising, in which the leading men of the Chiricahua bands, such as Naiche (c. 1857–1919), Juh (c. 1825 – Nov. 1883), and Geronimo (June 16, 1829 – Feb.17, 1909), left the reservation and went to war in Arizona, New Mexico, and northern Mexico. The warfare lasted about two years, ultimately ending in the US defeat of the Apache.
- Ne-big-ja-gy (also called Ka-clenny and Es-keg-i-slaw) was brother of Nakąįdotł’ini, the medicine men and chief of the Cañon Creek band. He succeeded his brother as chief of the Cañon Creek band.
- Sánchez (Béshbiwoo’dn or Bé-cbiɣo'dn – “Metal Tooth” or “Iron Tooth”) was successor of Diablo as Chief of the Carrizo Creek band. This band of about 250 people lived on Carrizo Creek, twelve miles north of Carrizo Crossing, was closely associated with Nakąįdotł’ini.

=== San Carlos Apaches ===
- Casador (Casadora, Nantʼánchoh – "Great Chief") was recognized as the main chief of the San Carlos band, before he left the reservation.
- Eskinospas (Eskénásbas, Hashkéénásbas– “Angry Circular”, called by the Whites Nosy) chief of a local group of the Arivaipa band.
- Santo, an Arivaipa Apache Chief and di-yin, father-in-law of Eskiminzin.
- Eskiminzin (aka Hashkéébánsiziin, Hashkíbáínzín – "Angry, Men Stand in Line for Him", born approximately 1828 near the Pinal Mountains as a Pinaleño) through marriage into the Arivaipa, became one of them and later their chief. He and his band together with the Pinaleño band under Capitán Chiquito were attacked by on April 30, 1871, in the Camp Grant Massacre. Led by William S. Oury and Jesús María Elías, who blamed every depredation in southern Arizona on the 500 Camp Grant Apaches, contacted an old ally Francisco Galerita, leader of the Tohono O'odham at San Xavier to punish the Arivaipa. In a surprise attack, 98 Apaches were killed and mutilated by Tohono O'odham (all but eight were women and children) and 27 children were sold into slavery in Mexico by the Tohono O'odham and the Mexicans.
- Capitán Chiquito was chief of the Pinaleño band, became together with the Arivaipa Chief Eskiminzin victim of the Camp Grant Massacre by Mexicans and their Tohono O'odham-allies, after the massacre the surviving Arivaipa and Pinaleño bands fled north to their Tonto Apache and Yavapai allies, together they raiding and fought the Americans until into 1875 with its culmination in General George Crook's Tonto Basin Campaign of 1872 and 1873.
- Talkalai (T'alkááli, *1817 – †March 4, 1930, Miami) was chief of the Apache Peaks band, and served as Chief of Scouts for three different United States Army Generals, Crook, Miles, and Howard. In April 1887 he was the leader of the scouts that marched 400 miles into Mexico and captured Geronimo. He once saved the life of his good friend John Clum, first Indian Agent at San Carlos Indian reservation, by shooting his own brother. This act so inflamed some of his band members that he was forced to flee the reservation and move into the town of Miami, Arizona. He was also a friend of the Earps in Tombstone and had been a guest of President Cleveland in the White House.
- Michael Minjarez, actor & Apache dialect supervisor.

== See also ==
- Western Apache language
