= Tonto Apache Tribe of Arizona =

Federally recognized tribe in Arizona, US

Tonto Apache Tribe of Arizona Dilzhę́’é (Western Apache)
- Indian reservation
- Location of Tonto Apache Reservation
- Federally recognized: October 6, 1972; 54 years ago
- Village: Payson, Arizona

Government
  - Chairman: Calvin Johnson

Area
  - Total: 85 acres (34 ha)

Population
  - Total: 145
- Demonym: Western Apache
- Time zone: UTC−07:00 (MST)
- Area code(s): 928
- Website: mazatzalcasino.com/about

The Tonto Apache Tribe of Arizona is a federally recognized tribe of Tonto Apache, a band of Western Apache. The tribe governs the Tonto Apache Reservation located in northwestern Gila County, Arizona.

They speak the Tonto Apache dialect of the Western Apache language, a member of Southern Athabaskan language family. Other Tonto Apache are enrolled in the Yavapai-Apache Nation of the Camp Verde Indian Reservation, and other Western Apache are enrolled in the San Carlos Apache Tribe of the San Carlos Reservation and the White Mountain Apache Tribe of the Fort Apache Reservation.

== Government ==
The tribe is governed by a democratically elected council. The current administration is:

- Chairman: Calvin Johnson
- Vice Chairman: Charles Lopez
- Council Member: Ty Davis
- Council Member: Joe Morgan
- Council Member: Jimmy Johnson

They ratified a constitution in 1980, which was amended in 1995 and 2005.

== Reservation ==
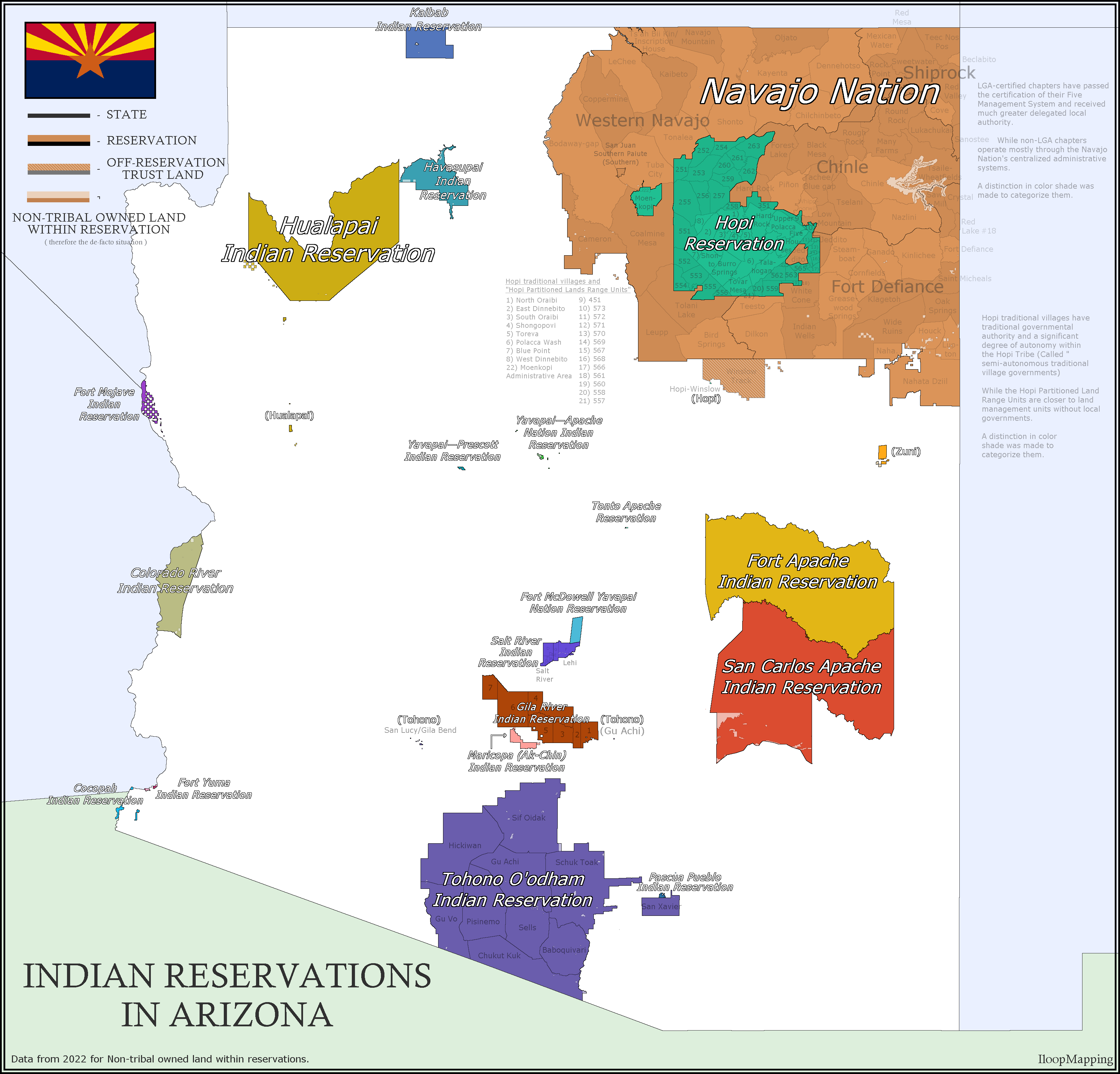
Map of the Tonto Apache Tribe of Arizona and neighboring tribes

The Tonto Apache Reservation, located south of Payson, Arizona (in Apache: Te-go-suk – “Place of the Yellow Water” or “Place of the Yellow Land”) in ancestral territory of one of the principal Dilzhe'e Apache clans – the “People of the Yellow Speckled Water”, was created in 1972 within the Tonto National Forest northeast of Phoenix. It consists of 85 acres (344,000 m^{2}). With the smallest land base of any reservation in the state of Arizona, it serves approximately 140 residents, as of 1994. The reservation is located adjacent to the town of Payson, in northwestern Gila County, approximately 95 miles northeast of Phoenix and 100 miles southeast of Flagstaff.

== Enrollment ==
The current constitution requires citizens of the Tonto Apache Tribe of Arizona to have a minimum blood quantum of 1/4 Apache, including Tonto Apache and other Western Apache, or Yavapai-Apache blood. As of 2015, the tribe had approximately 145 citizens, most of whom live on the reservation.

== Economic development ==
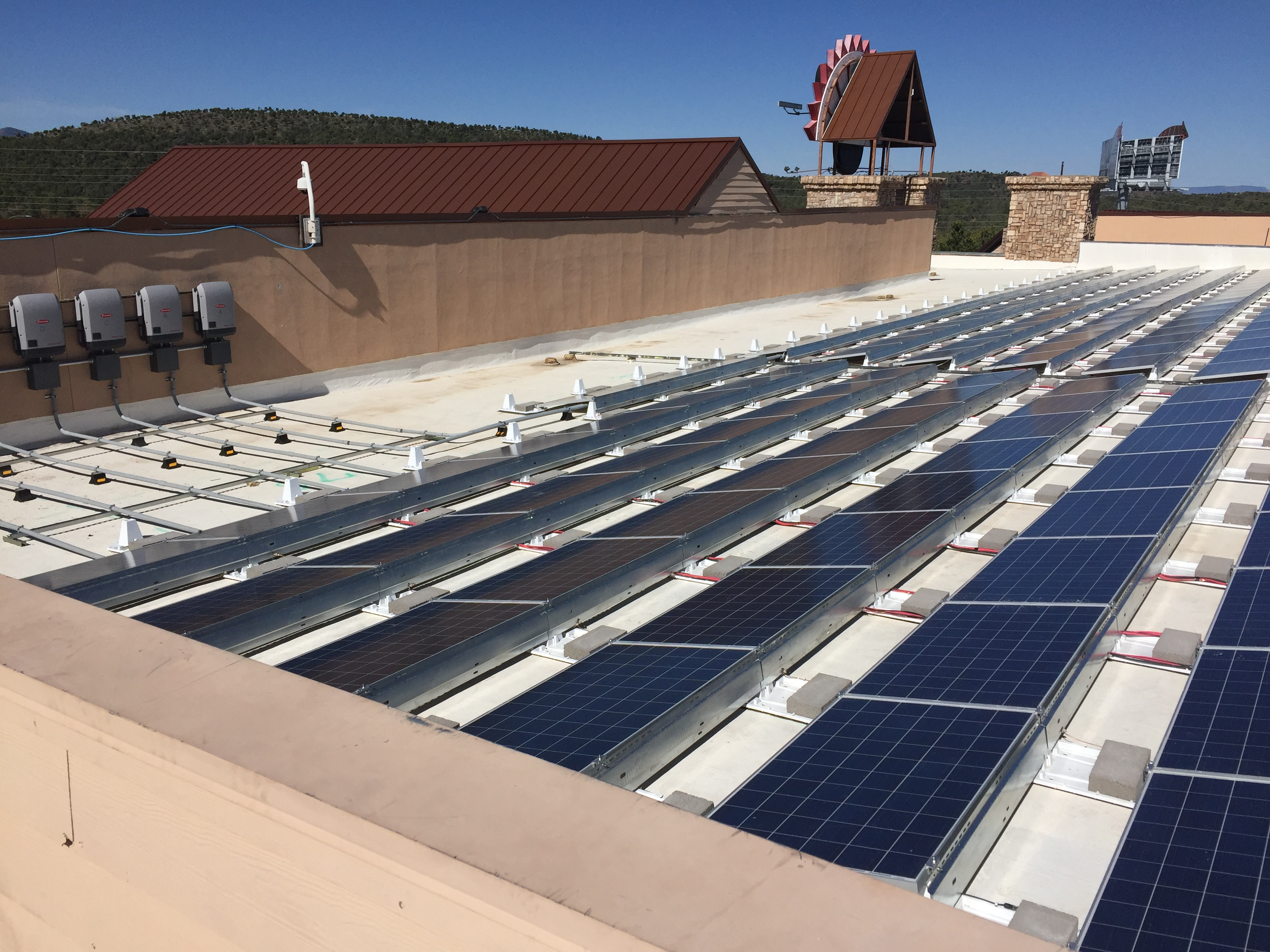
Part of a solar array on the Mazatzal Hotel on the Tonto Apache Indian Reservation, 2016

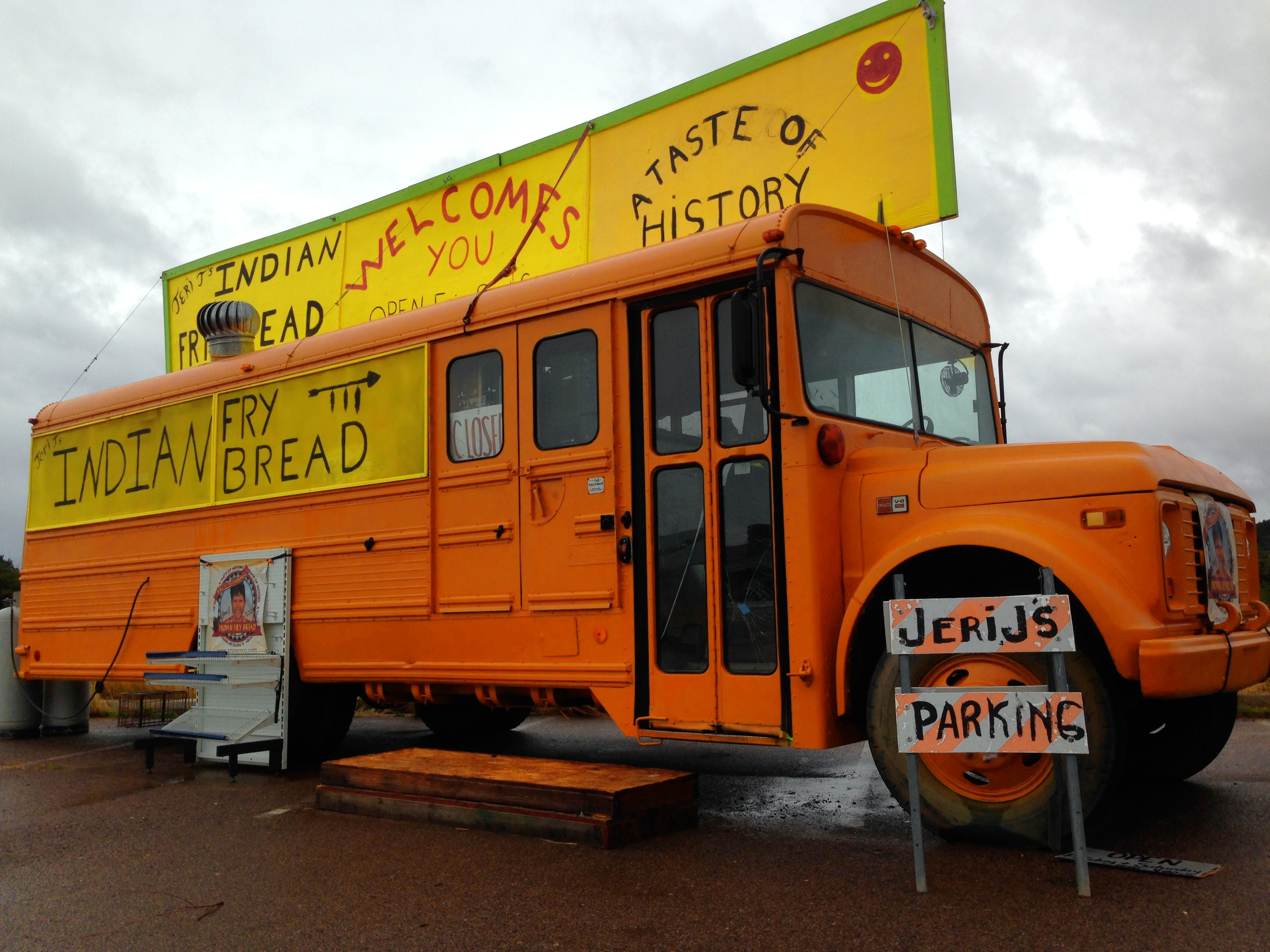
A frybread truck on the Tonto Apache reservation

In 1994, the tribe opened the Mazatzal Hotel and Casino in Payson, which became the largest employer in the town. In 2015, the tribe built a 249-kilowatt solar photovoltaic system on its Mazatzal Hotel.

== History ==
=== 19th century ===
The Tonto Apache Tribe include the descendants of the Dilzhe'e Apache who lived in the Payson vicinity long before the arrival of Europeans. The Prescott gold strike in 1863 initiated a wave of violence from settlers against the Tonto Apache. During the first reservation era of the 19th century, they were moved to the large Rio Verde Reserve, near Camp Verde, which was established in 1871 for the Tonto and Wipukepa (Northeastern Yavapai). The U.S. federal government dissolved the reservation in 1875 and forced the people to relocate to the San Carlos Reservation. After 20 years of exile, some Tonto Apache gradually returned to Payson only to find white settlers had taken much of their land.

=== 20th century ===
In 1972, the tribe was federally recognized. They ratified their constitution in 1980.

== See also ==
- Western Apache
- Yavapai-Apache Nation
- Southern Athabaskan languages
