= Phoenix Indian School =

- Phoenix Indian School Historic District
- U.S. National Register of Historic Places
- U.S. Historic district
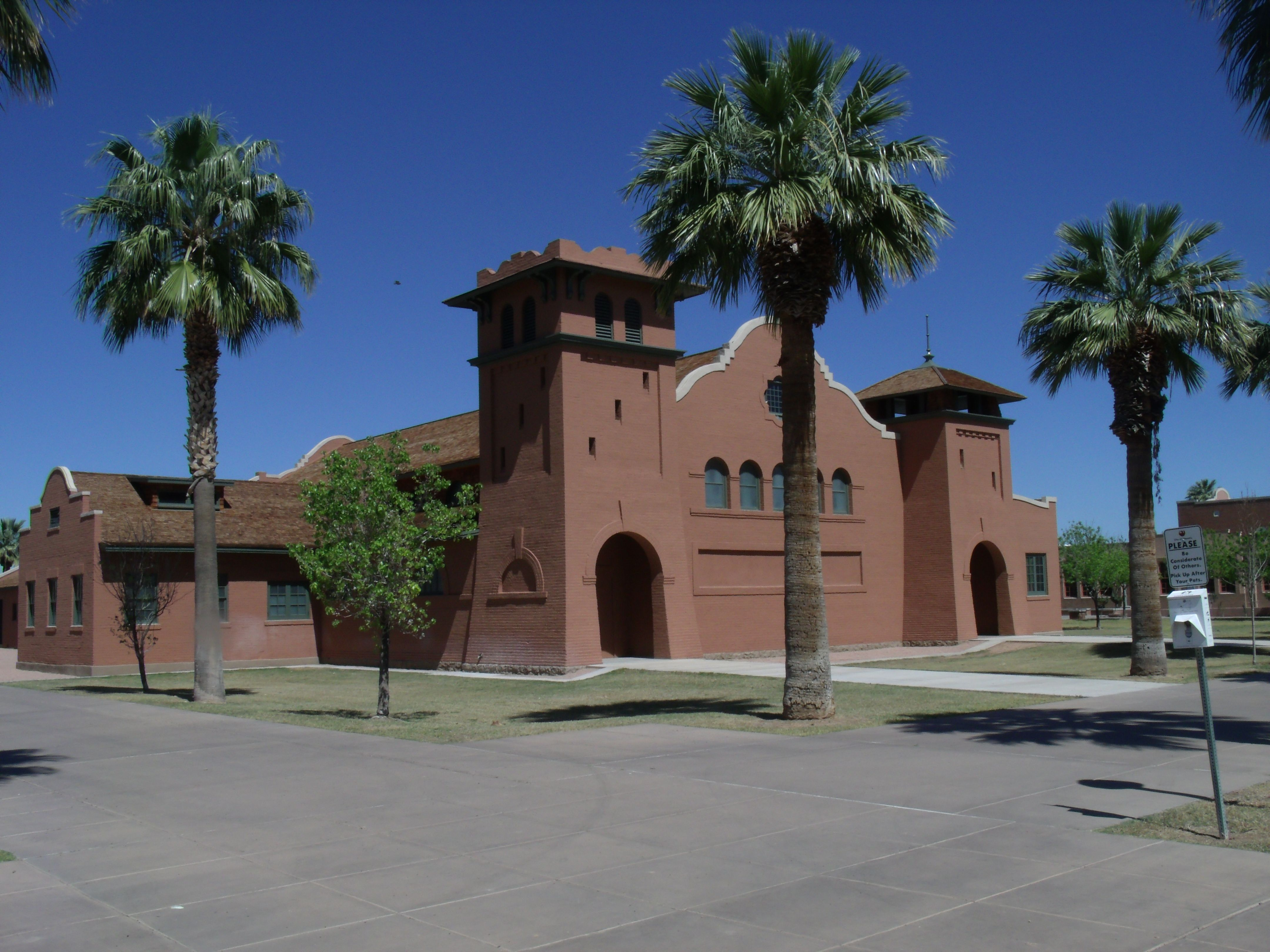
- Phoenix Indian School

- Location within Arizona Location within the United States
- Location: 300 E. Indian School Rd., Phoenix, Arizona
- Coordinates: 33°29′51″N 112°4′10″W
- Area: 3 acres (1.2 ha)
- Built: 1902 (auditorium); 1922 (Memorial Hall); 1931 (Band Building)
- Architectural style: Mission Revival, Moderne
- NRHP reference No.: 01000521
- Added to NRHP: May 31, 2001

The Phoenix Indian School, or Phoenix Indian High School in its later years, was a Bureau of Indian Affairs-operated school in Encanto Village, in the heart of Phoenix, Arizona. It served lower grades also from 1891 to 1935, and then served as a high school thereafter. It opened in 1891 and closed in 1990 on the orders of the federal government. During its existence, it was the only non-reservation BIA school in Arizona. The Phoenix Indian School Historic District is a three-acre (1.2 ha) portion of the 160-acre (65 ha) campus that contains some of the most historic buildings and became part of the National Register of Historic Places in 2001.

== History ==
=== 1891–1931: Phoenix Indian School ===
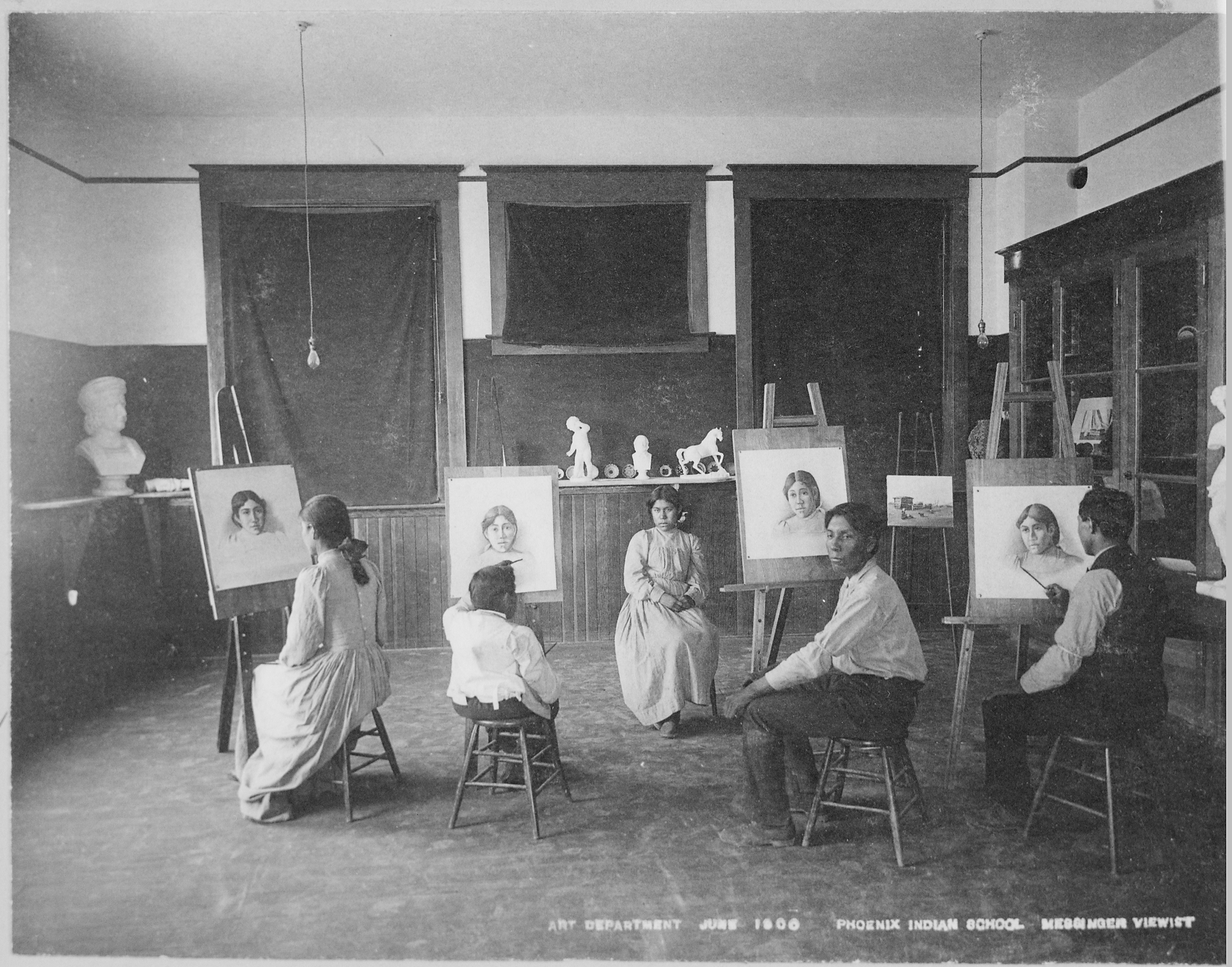
Students in an art class, June 1900

==== 19th century ====
After a year-long search for a school site, the Indian School opened in 1891 on 160 acres (65 ha) of land. Up until 1931, the federal "assimilation" policy that sought to regimentalize and culturally assimilate Native American students was in place.

Physical growth was the major theme in the 1890s as the school opened. Growth in students was quick to come under superintendents Wellington Rich and Harwood Hall. By 1896 there were 380 students, in comparison to just 100 at its 1891 founding. It had twelve buildings, including a "girls building" designed by prominent local architect J.M. Creighton (built 1892) and a Victorian-style hospital (built mid-1890s). However, the focus on growing the school didn't mean that the assimilation was occurring or meeting federal expectations. Some students did learn to speak English, however there were only four academic teachers by 1897.

Vocational training was instead the emphasis: boys learned business skills and girls domestic skills. To that end, officials instituted the "outing system," which was loosely modeled after the outing program Richard Henry Pratt had instituted at Carlisle Indian Industrial School; students worked at off-campus jobs to gain experience and earn money, as well as to help assimilate them. However, unlike Carlisle, the students did not live with one particular family, but were instead cheap contract labor. Due to several incidents and the abuses that would later be critical in changing the course of PIS's history, the idea of assimilation through employment quickly went out the window at PIS as it became a way for white Phoenix employers to procure cheap Native American labor.

In 1897, another new superintendent took the role at PIS, Samuel McCowan. He continued an emphasis on increasing enrollment but also realized that academics had to improve. He diversified the student body, recruiting Mojaves and Hopis from all over the southwest. The aggressive recruitment that closed the 1890s made PIS the second largest school in the federal system, with over 700 students. Overcrowding accompanied the rapid growth, and during McCowan's tenure, he built new dormitories and employee residences.

==== 20th century ====
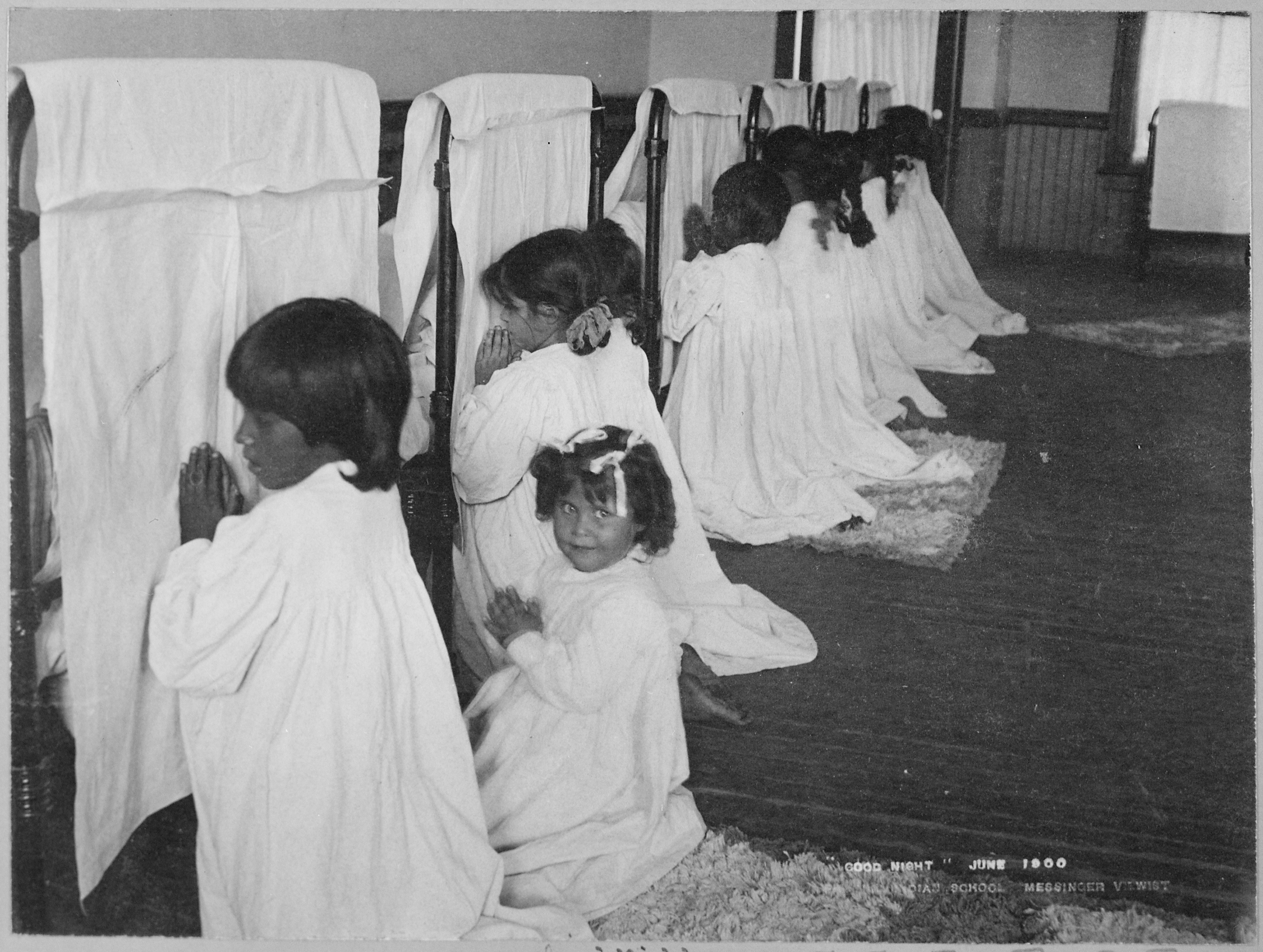
Little girls praying beside their beds in a PIS dormitory, June 1900

A Mission Revival style auditorium was designed in 1901 and constructed the next year. As increasing enrollment made it clear to administrators that a dining hall was needed, the design modifications to turn the auditorium into one were performed in 1903 and a kitchen was built in 1904. The Dining Hall is the oldest extant building on the PIS campus.

1902 brought another new superintendent, Charles Goodman. He inherited a stable school with 56 employees (12 of whom were teachers) and a 24-building campus surrounded by 240 acres (97 ha) of farm land. A series of major events took place in his tenure (which lasted until 1915), including a major tuberculosis outbreak, but Goodman's time as superintendent was also characterized with the first real progress in graduating students. By 1914, a total of 168 students had received diplomas from the PIS – none had done so before 1901 This was just under five percent of the student body, but it proved from a federal perspective that assimilation was finally occurring.

During this time period in PIS's history, various techniques were used to attempt better assimilation – new students were organized into military companies, given a uniform and work clothes, and marched to and from classes after starting at 5am.

===== Serving in World War I =====
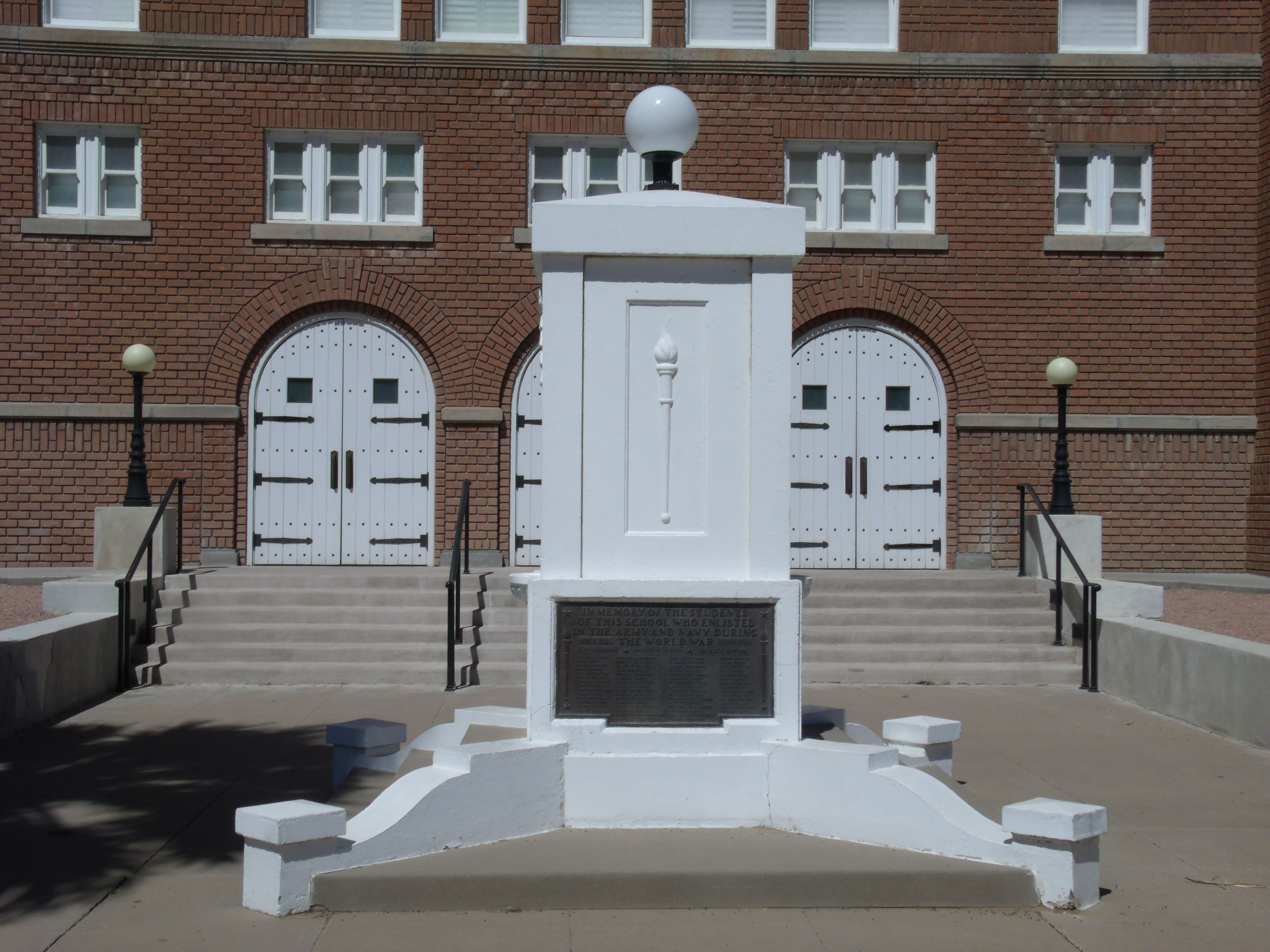
The War Memorial

John B. Brown became superintendent in 1915. Assimilation continued to make progress, reflected in Native American participation in the military. Male students were receptive to military service after being regimented at the school. In 1912, Arizona formed Company F in its state National Guard, the first all-Indian unit in the nation, composed of older PIS students and former students. Despite not being citizens, many students and alumni volunteered to fight in World War I. Within four months of President Woodrow Wilson's declaration of war on Germany in April 1917, 64 PIS students and alumni volunteered to serve in the army and navy. Upon returning from border duty near Naco, Company F became part of the 158th Infantry Regiment, Fortieth Division. Their distinguished combat helped to change attitudes in Washington about Native Americans, leading eventually to the Indian Citizenship Act being signed into law on June 2, 1924.

In direct response to this successful assimilation, the federal government authorized the construction of the Memorial Hall and War Memorial in 1922. The Mission Revival style structure was built for $50,000, and students provided much of the labor. It replaced the original auditorium – now the Dining Hall. Memorial Hall saw use for general assemblies, graduations, and theatrical productions. The War Memorial, just south, commemorated the founding of the school and the service of its students.

===== Assimilation fades =====
Though Superintendent Brown was personally committed to assimilation, the environment began to change in the 1920s. After 1915, Indian schools began to face troubles, such as overcrowding and budget cuts. Discipline problems increased, and the quality of student health care at Indian schools nationwide declined. In response to these issues, a reform movement began in the early 1920s led by John Collier.

Eventually, in 1928, The Problem of Indian Administration (the Meriam Report) was published. W. Carson Ryan's section on education criticized all "Indian" education in the United States, especially the non-reservation schools. It called for an end to assimilation.

At PIS, Superintendent Brown, a career Indian Service educator, held his ground. He sought to ameliorate the school's image by reforming the outing system, which by 1920 had become something very different. Most PIS students worked on weekends and during the summer, and most of the people sent out were non-students. Brown sought to enhance this, and in 1922, he declared that the school would be responsible for all Native American employment in Phoenix.

In 1929, assimilationist Indian Commissioner Charles H. Burke resigned under pressure from reformers. He was replaced by Charles J. Rhoads, who was committed to enacting the reforms of the Meriam Report. Rhoads and Collier began to have disputes; Collier's reformers felt that Rhoads was moving too methodically. Rhoads issued circular number 2556 in 1930 allowing some forms of punishment at Indian schools to maintain order. The disputes came to a head; Collier found the action a backwards step and challenged Rhoads by bringing information concerning brutality at PIS to the forefront.

In May 1930, the Senate Subcommittee on Indian Affairs held a meeting over the allegations. Collier argued that PIS was not just guilty of brutal treatment but of mismanagement as well. The charges were never proven, and there was never a definitive conclusion, but the hearing helped bring about changes, such as the appointment of W. Carson Ryan as Director of Indian Education in September 1930. A reorganization of the Indian Service that followed allowed Meriam Report reformers to ascend to top posts in the education bureau.

Brown remained at the PIS, but his days were quickly numbered by the damage sustained to his reputation. In April 1931, the Subcommittee held additional hearings in Arizona about conditions at PIS. Brown lost any remaining support and retired in July 1931.

At this critical juncture, the grammar school building, built in an understated Moderne style, was constructed.

=== 1931–1990: Phoenix Indian High School ===
==== New PIS era ====
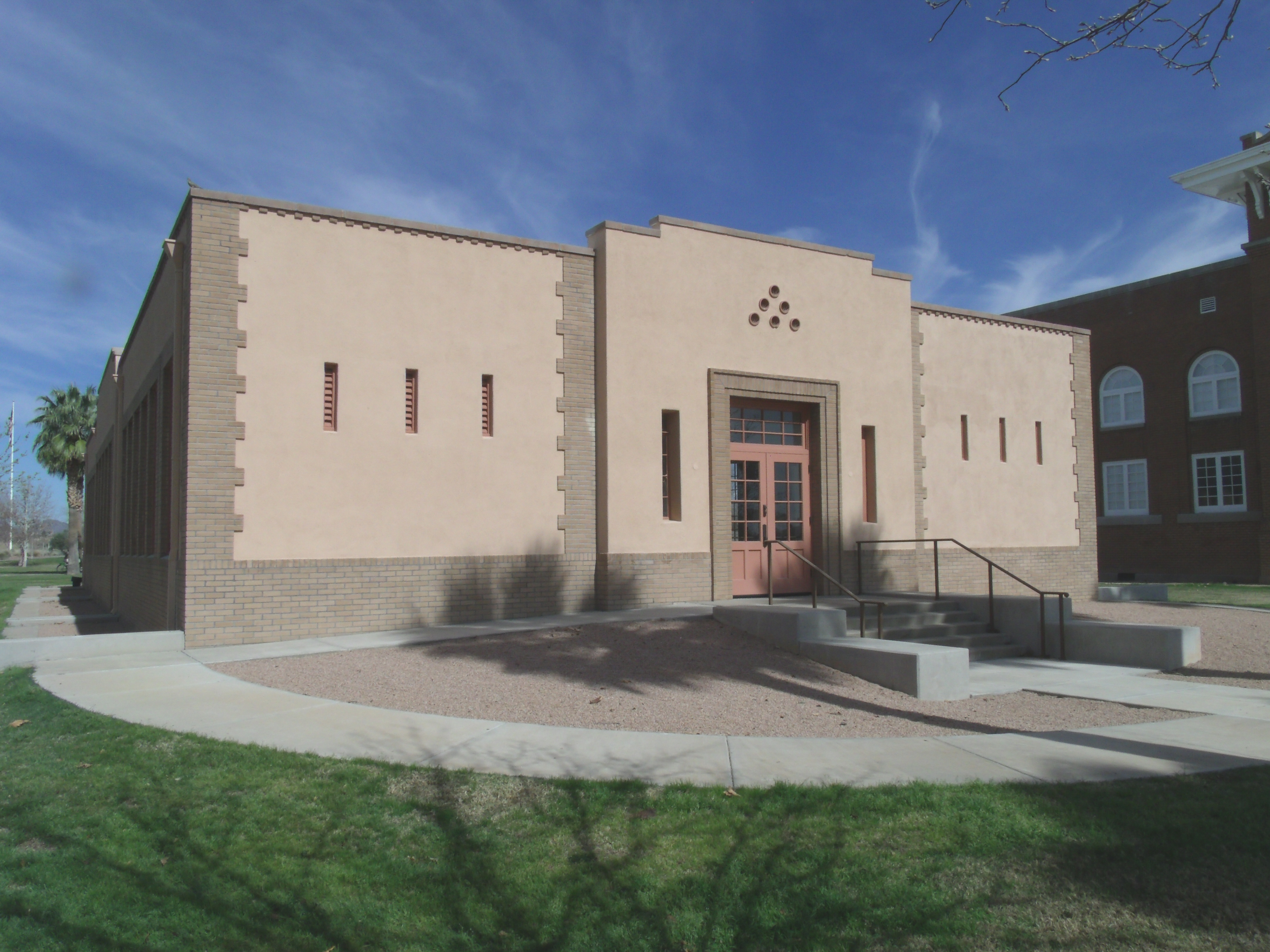
The Indian School Band Building built in 1931

Carl H. Skinner succeeded John Brown as superintendent of the Phoenix Indian School in 1931. He had a doctorate in education and no experience in the Indian Service. Under Skinner and with the assistance of new Indian Bureau chief John Collier, the facility was modernized; the old guard faded away; and waste was eliminated. Two of his first changes had some of the largest impact. The military discipline was no more; students did not have to wear uniforms, and the band no longer marched students into the dining hall. As reservation day schools were built, the lower grades at PIS were discontinued. This brought the enrollment down from 950 in 1928 to 425 in 1936. From here on out the Phoenix Indian School served grades 7–12.

The 1930s PIS curriculum emphasized vocational education, such as masonry; carpentry; and painting. However, the prevailing Great Depression reduced urban employment for Native Americans. The agricultural program was expanded to help students who wished to return to the reservation.

==== World War II—going mainstream ====
World War II had an indelible impact at PIS. Native Americans and PIS students participated in the war effort both at home and abroad. Many Native Americans volunteered or were drafted, serving in all branches of the military in the Pacific and European theaters. Students who stayed home bought war bonds and participated in blood drives.

It was also World War II and the widespread rate of service that brought Native American illiteracy to the forefront. Some Navajo ex-servicemen went to Washington in 1946 to ask that treaty obligations over education were met. In 1947, the Special Navajo Program was created, in which Navajo children attended five years of school to receive an eighth-grade education.

The SNP led to major growth at PIS. 200 Navajo children enrolled in the first year, and more students participated every year until 1958, when the PIS had 427 Navajos and 600 regular students. By the time the SNP was closed in 1963, several thousand students had taken part.

The major growth at PIS led to overcrowding. There was a lack of space at the school, and many buildings dated back to the 1890s and were obsolete. In response, Glenn Lundeen, the school's superintendent, asked for a BIA review of the campus in 1952. A building plan was adopted, and for the next 13 years, the BIA campus was modernized. Eight new dormitories, an administration building, a materials center, five science lab classrooms, a warehouse, and nine home economics/vocational classrooms were built as part of the construction blitz at this time.

The curriculum also began to change, as between 1947 and 1965, the federal government began the "termination policy" which centered on ending federal responsibility for reservations. Emphasis was placed on integrating Native Americans into mainstream America as well as teaching Native Americans skills useful in city jobs. Girls were taught typing and cosmetology, and boys could take new math and science classes. The North Central Association, which accredits high schools, accredited the school in 1960. The school also became known as the Phoenix Indian High School. It became a member of the Arizona Interscholastic Association, the governing body for high school sports in Arizona. The earliest AIA enrollment records for the Phoenix Indian School date to 1967, when the school had 885 students.

By this time, the area bounded by Central Avenue, Seventh Street, Indian School Road, and Camelback Road was home to four high schools: Catholic Brophy College Preparatory and Xavier College Preparatory, the public Central High School, and Phoenix Indian High School. In 1971, the schools served 4,600 students combined, and in 1984, they combined for a total of 5,000 students.

==== To closure ====
As the United States changed in the 1960s and early 1970s, the upheaval affected students at PIHS. Students regained their interest in their Native American identity, as seen in the growth of tribal clubs. At the same time, students and teachers began to question how "Indian" education emphasized some skills only useful in white culture. With the passage of the Indian Self-Determination and Education Assistance Act of 1975, Native Americans could finally have more of a voice at BIA schools. The self-determination trend showed that non-reservation boarding schools were expendable. For most of the early 1970s, enrollment at PIS declined to a stable number of about 550 students, held through the mid-1980s.

In 1982, the Reagan Administration recommended closing Phoenix Indian School. Daniel Peaches, a member of the Arizona House of Representatives, and members of the school community opposed the school closure. That year, the Indian Bureau announced it would close the Indian School, but this was delayed because the Hopi and Papago tribes did not have their own high schools. Sherman Indian High School in Riverside, California was slated to take boarding students from Phoenix Indian.

The facility was previously the closest boarding high school for the Havasupai people in the Havasupai Indian Reservation. After the closure, Sherman Indian became the closest boarding school to the reservation. According to The Arizona Republic, because the Navajo Nation had its own high schools, the closure of the Phoenix Indian School would have the tribe "unaffected".

In 1986 the school had 366 of them, with Arizona residents making up 85% of that number. By 1987, with the opening of Hopi Junior/Senior High School in Keams Canyon and Tohono O'odham High School in Sells, the situation of the lack of Native American high schools was rectified. PIS closed its doors for the last time in the spring of 1990. In its final year, the PIS had only 80 students, a far cry from the 638 it held in 1985.

The name remains on Indian School Road, an important Phoenix arterial street, and in Steele Indian School Park.

== Architecture ==
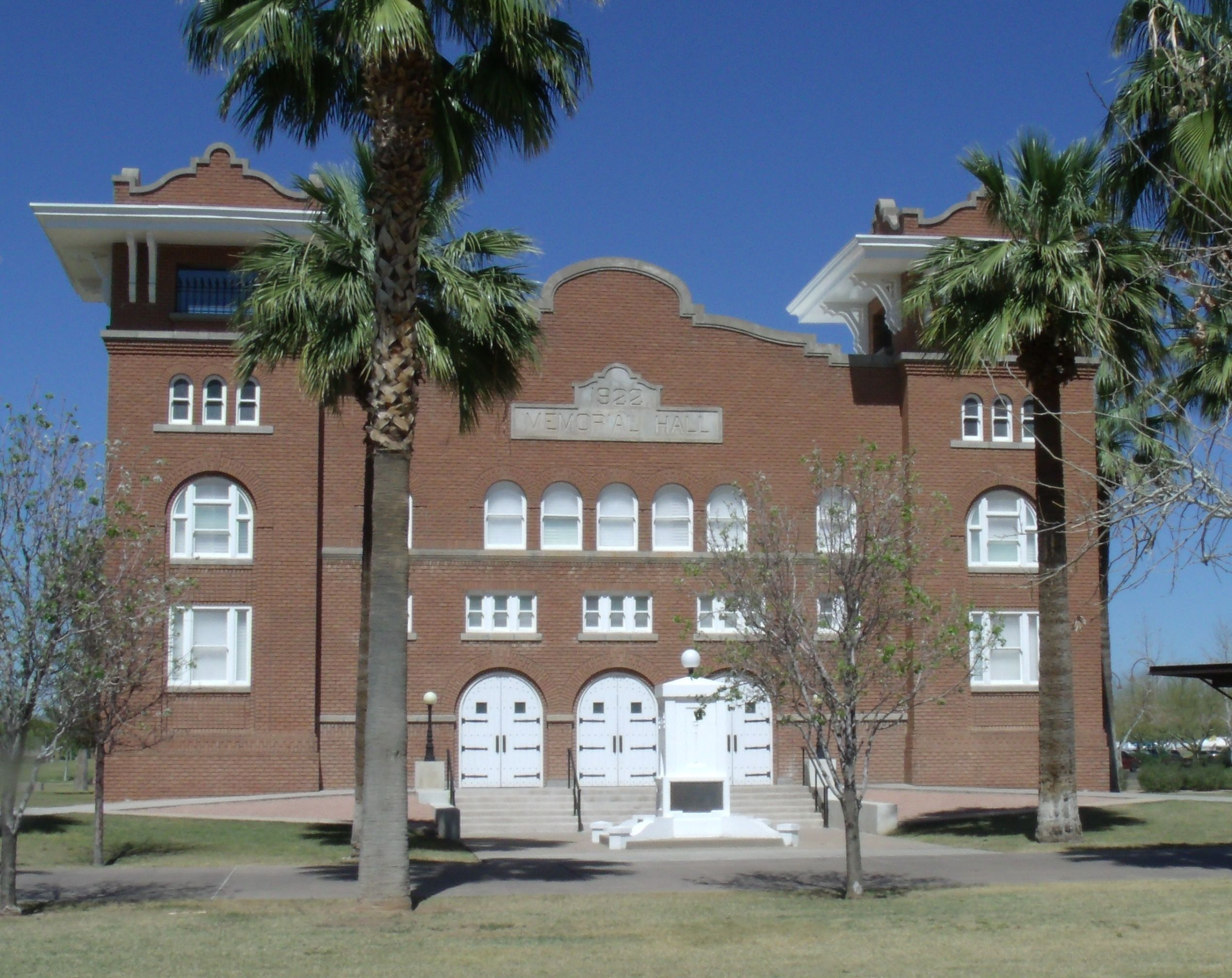
Memorial Hall (built 1922)

The original buildings on the Phoenix Indian School campus were built in Victorian Queen Anne style. However, the oldest remaining building, the Dining Hall, bucked this trend. Both the Dining Hall and Memorial Auditorium were constructed in Mission Revival style, in 1902 and 1922, respectively. They are the only Mission Revival buildings on the PIS campus, and no use of Mission Revival in Arizona before the Dining Hall's construction has been documented. The two buildings are considered "the best ... Mission Revival auditoria ... in the Southwest." (They are the only Mission Revival auditoria in Arizona.) By the time the Memorial Hall had been built, most of Mission Revival's elements had been replaced by Spanish Colonial Revival details.

Its use by the federal government is also uncommon. From 1897 to 1912, all federal buildings were designed and built under the responsibility of the supervising architect for the U.S. Treasury Department, James Knox Taylor. During a time when the Historicist Neoclassical style was the common one for federal buildings, the Dining Hall is the only known Mission Revival federal building. A specific architect has not been identified. It was built for $7,500.

Brick was used as a primary material for the first building as well as the second. After the 1906 San Francisco earthquake, most buildings in this style were constructed of concrete. The use of brick at Memorial Hall shows "a complete lack of understanding" of the evolution of the style.

The building for the lower grades was modified on the interior to house the band, but it retains its 1931 Moderne exterior. In 2014, Native American Connections and the Phoenix Indian Center launched a project to renovate the building, hoping to open it to the public for the first time in 25 years.

== New park ==
The school's campus and buildings, after its 1990 closure, sat vacant for several years. The city of Phoenix obtained the land in 1996 in a land exchange that involved the Barron Collier Company and the federal government. Barron Collier established a $35 million trust fund for Native American children, and the city converted the campus into Steele Indian School Park, which opened in 2001.

The three NRHP-listed buildings and large pond make up its landmark core. The park's design pays homage to the site's Native American history. Many of the design elements reflect Native American concepts of life, earth and the universe.

The 75-acre (30 ha) park includes the 2.5-acre (1.0 ha) Bird Lake, the outdoor amphitheater with seating for 1,500 people, the 15-acre (6.1 ha) Entry Garden featuring desert native plants and Native American poems in the ramps, the 30-acre (12 ha) Phoenix Green shady oasis area with meandering walkways, and a 15-acre (6.1 ha) neighborhood park with recreation, sports, and picnicking features.

The Phoenix Indian School Preservation Coalition, co-chaired by Jean Chaudhuri and Lenny Foster, gathered support from 18 of 21 tribes in Arizona for the specific purpose of encouraging certain design features in the development of the park. Jean, along with John Lewis (Inter-tribal President), Arlo Nau (President - Native American Heritage Society), Tom Amiotte (President - Native American Viet Nam Veterans) presented their concepts and ideas to Mayor Paul Johnson and members of his staff in early 1991. This group was active in every public meeting regarding the development of the property, supporting the inclusion of cultural and historical significance in the site plan. No mention of the group or its efforts appeared in the public media or final documentation of the story of how the park was developed. Jean passed in 1998. The park opened in November 2001.

== Notable students ==
- Frank Austin, Navajo artist
- Stanley Bahe, Navajo watercolor painter
- Roberta Blackgoat, activist, public speaker, writer, environmentalist, and artist.
- Ira Hayes, Akimel O'odham United States Marine who raised the American flag at Iwo Jima
- Viola Jimulla, Chief of Yavapai-Prescott Tribe
- Charles Loloma, Hopi jewelry maker, also known for his work in pottery, painting, and ceramics
- Linda Lomahaftewa, Hopi printmaker
- Parker McKenzie, Kiowa linquist
- Mary Morez, Navajo artist
- Daisy Hooee Nampeyo, Hopi-Tewa potter
- Ida Redbird, Gila River Indian Community potter
- Anna Moore Shaw, Pima activist, first Native woman to earn a high school diploma in Arizona
- Patty Talahongva, Hopi journalist and news executive
- Daisy Taugelchee, Navajo rug weaver
- Peterson Zah, first President of the Navajo Nation

== Notable faculty and other associated people ==
- Kay Curley Bennett, Navajo artist, musician, and writer
- Jean Chaudhuri, Creek activist, inducted into the Arizona Women's Hall of Fame
- Diana Yazzie Devine, activist
- Dorothy Sunrise Lorentino, Comanche teacher, first Native American inducted into the National Teachers Hall of Fame
- Lloyd Kiva New, Painting teacher, president emeritus of the Institute of American Indian Arts
- Woesha Cloud North, arts instructor
- W. Richard West Sr., Cheyenne muralist and arts teacher

== See also ==
- American Indian outing programs
