= Ann Shaw =

Ann Shaw may refer to:

- Ann Shaw, character in Tammy (comics)
- Ann Shaw (figure skater); see Figure skating at the 2002 Winter Olympics
- Ann Shaw (social worker) (1921–2015), civic leader and social worker based out of Los Angeles
- Ann Shaw, South Africa, a locality in South Africa (Eastern Cape), 2 km off Middledrift
- Ann Shaw Carter (1922–2005), nee Ann Shaw, American aviator

== See also ==
- Anne Shaw (disambiguation)
- Anna Shaw (disambiguation)
- Annie C. Shaw (1852–1887), American landscape painter
