= Anne Shaw =

Anne Shaw may refer to:

- Anne Shaw, character in Ride 'Em Cowboy
- The Disappearance of Anne Shaw (1928), book by Augusta Huiell Seaman
- Anne Gillespie Shaw (1904–1982), Scottish engineer and businesswoman

== See also ==
- Ann Shaw (disambiguation)
- Anna Shaw (disambiguation)
- Annie C. Shaw (1852–1887), American landscape painter
