= Anna Shaw =

Anna Shaw may refer to:

- Anna Howard Shaw (1847–1919), leader of the women's suffrage movement in the United States
- Anna Shaw (serial killer) (1892–1958), one of America's first known female serial killers
- Anna Moore Shaw (1898–1976), Akimel O'odham storyteller, autobiographer, and civic leader

== See also ==
- Ann Shaw (disambiguation)
- Anne Shaw (disambiguation)
