= Fernandez v. Arizona =

Fernandez v. Arizona, 16 Ariz. 269, 144 P. 640 (1914), was a landmark decision of the Arizona Supreme Court in which the court acknowledged the competency of Indigenous, female, and non-English speaking witnesses.

== Background of the case ==
Fernandez v. Arizona
- Court: Arizona Supreme Court
- Full case name: Juan Fernandez v. the State of Arizona
- Started: Dec. 7, 1914
- Decided: Dec. 7, 1914

Case history
- Appealed from: Arizona v. Fernandez

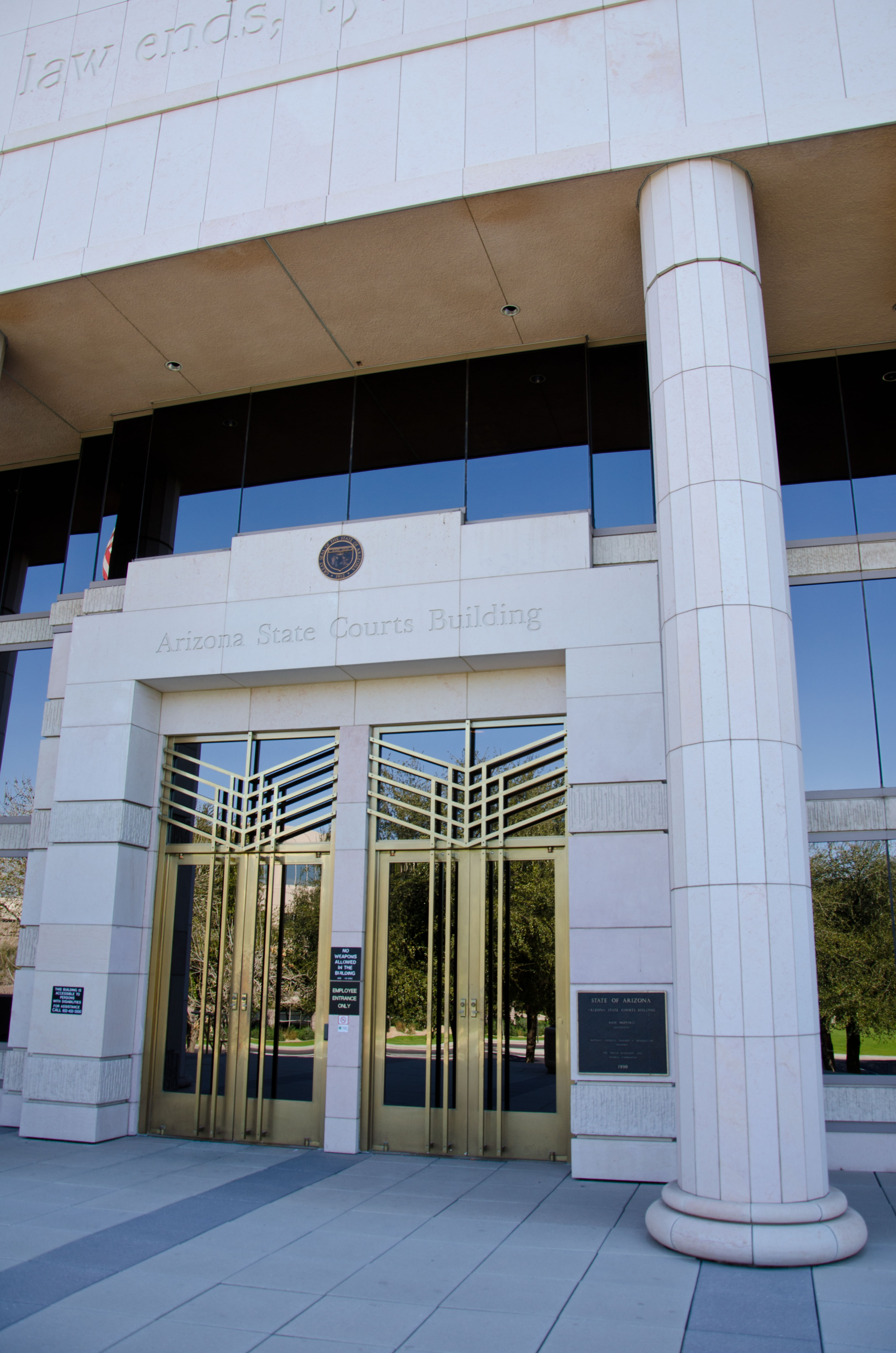
Arizona Supreme Court

In the state of Arizona, before 1914, the government did not recognize Indigenous people as right-bearing individuals or citizens. Due to this, Native residents, especially those who did not speak English, were not allowed to testify in court against white defendants.

In the late night of September 1, 1913, a gun shot was heard by A.J. Oliver, a white resident living in Granite Creek, a primarily Indigenous community located near Prescott, Arizona. The next morning, on September 2, 1913, Juan Fernandez, a Hispanic cobbler worker, returned to the tent of Dolores Rodriguez, where he was living at the time, wearing bloody clothes.

Fernandez was shortly arrested and put on trial at the end of 1913 in the case of the State of Arizona v. Juan Fernandez, which was held in Prescott, Arizona. Juan Fernandez was then convicted of the first degree murder of Jesus Esparcia in the case Arizona v. Fernandez (1913). His guilty verdict initially came with the death penalty, but was shortly changed to life imprisonment. Amongst the witnesses that took the stand were two females, Mary Woolsey, an Indigenous widow from the Yavapai tribe who did not speak English, and Dolores Rodriguez, a Mexican mother.

== Question before the Court ==
The essential question presented before the Court was should the legal precedent of not allowing non-English speaking and non-citizens to testify as a witness in court be continued in the State of Arizona?

This precedent stemmed from exclusion laws. These laws prohibited citizenship for Native Americans living in the United States, which in turn, mean that they could not testify in court.

== Decision of the Court ==
Juan Fernandez, along with his two attorneys, J. Ralph Taseher and Neil C. Clark, attempted to appeal Fernandez's guilty verdict in the Arizona Supreme Court, by filing an appeal from the case Arizona v. Fernandez. The Attorney General, G. P. Bullard, and the Assistant to the Attorney General, Leslie C. Hardy, represented the state of Arizona. The appellant team hoped to overturn the guilty verdict by claiming the incompetence of two of the witnesses from the original trial, Mary Woolsey and Dolores Rodriguez.

In Mary Woolsey's case, the appellant team claimed that she did not have mental competence, stating that Woolsey's oath giving during her voir dire was given without Woolsey having a full understanding of what she was committing to.

The appellant team also argued that Dolores Rodriguez was incompetent under Section 1226, Penal Code of 1913.

The court, headed by Judge Frank O. Smith, ruled against Fernandez, determining the witnesses Mary Woolsey and Dolores Rodriguez were competent and their testimonies stood according to the interpretation of People v. Bradford 1 Cal. App. 41, 81 Pac. 712 (1905). This set the precedent in the state of Arizona for allowing non-citizens, women, and non-English speaking people to testify in legal cases.
