= Patricia Ann McGee =

Native American Yavapai-Prescott tribal leader

Prescott Yavapai Tribal president
- Preceded by: Don S. Mitchell
- Succeeded by: Stanhope Rice, Jr.

Personal details
- Born: Patricia Ann Vaughn; July 9, 1926 Holbrook, Arizona
- Died: April 6, 1994 (aged 67) Phoenix, Arizona
- Resting place: Yavapai-Prescott Tribal Cemetery
- Spouse: Ernest "Ernie" McGee (1931–1994)
- Parent(s): Amy Jimulla and Albert Vaughn

Patricia Ann McGee (July 7, 1926 – April 6, 1994) (Yavapai-Hualapai) was a Native American tribal leader who served as president of the Yavapai-Prescott Tribe. An effective advocate for her tribe, she garnered millions of dollars in federal and state funds to improve the infrastructure on the Yavapai reservation. She negotiated a water settlement agreement between the federal government and the tribe and established the first gaming license for any Indian tribe in Arizona. She helped develop a community center which earned a federal design award and served as an educational center to preserve both the culture and language of the Yavapai. In 2006, McGee was nominated by Supreme Court Justice Sandra Day O'Connor and inducted into the Arizona Women's Hall of Fame.

== Early life ==
Patricia Ann Vaughn was born on July 9, 1926, in Holbrook, Arizona to Amy (née Jimulla) and Albert Vaughn. Her heritage was half Yavapai and half Hualapai. After her mother's death in 1940, Vaughan and her brother went to live with their grandparents, Sam and Viola Jimulla, chief and chieftess of the Yavapai-Prescott Tribe. Vaughn attended the Indian school at Valentine, Arizona, and then graduated from Prescott High School. She continued her studies and was an honor student at the Haskell Indian Junior College in Lawrence, Kansas, and took extension courses at the University of Kansas in psychology and public speaking. In the 1950s, she married Korean War veteran, Ernest McGee (1931–1994).

== Career ==
Beginning in 1966, McGee worked in the tribal government. She first served as tribal secretary-treasurer and then in 1968 was elected as vice president, serving two terms. Because of the dual system of governance established when Viola Jimulla took over as chieftess of the tribe, Jimulla was succeeded as chieftess by her daughters Grace Mitchell in 1967 and upon Mitchell's death in 1976, by Lucy Miller. However, the Tribal Council, which had been established in 1940 was led by Grace's husband, Don S. Mitchell until 1972 when McGee was elected as president. When Miller was appointed as chieftess, McGee was reconfirmed as president of the tribe. She served for 16 years before being ousted by Stanhope "Stan" Rice Jr. in 1988. After he served one term, McGee was re-elected in 1990 and served until her death.

In 1971, McGee returned to school, studying at Prescott College and earning a degree in social anthropology. When McGee took over as president in 1972, she stated that her goal was to focus on building the tribal resources. One of her projects was to secure government funds for a tribal community center. After years of losing out funds to the community, the tribe, and an organization of non-native citizens from nearby Prescott, Arizona, called Friends of the Yavapai, were successful in obtaining funds in 1974. The goals for the center were to establish a library and preserve both cultural history and language. McGee was one of the founders of the Yavapai Language Program. She was awarded a state citation for her work on the project by Governor Jack Williams and the project received a national urban design and management award from the Department of Housing and Urban Development (HUD). McGee garnered another federal grant in 1975 for the tribe to build an industrial complex to increase job opportunities. In 1976, the Horizons on Display project of the tribe was selected as one of two Arizona projects honored by the national Bicentennial celebration. Though McGee had helped with the project and attained over a million dollars in grants for the tribe as their business manager, she was ousted from the position in 1977, because the tribe felt that her serving as both business manager and president was a conflict of interest.

McGee secured millions of dollars from both the federal government and the City of Prescott to build a resort and conference center for the tribe. She leased reservation lands for shopping centers to earn tribal revenue and negotiated terms for a water settlement between the government and the tribe. In 1992, McGee signed the first compact with the State of Arizona for Indian Gaming, adding Bucky's Casino to the Prescott Resort. Her efforts to improve the economic prospects of her tribe gained national recognition in Time, Fortune and the Wall Street Journal. In addition to her economic development projects, McGee served on the State Civil Rights Advisory Board and was appointed by President Richard Nixon to serve on the National Advisory Council on Indian Education (NACIE). She also served on the boards of both a national and state Inter-tribal association.

McGee died on April 6, 1994, in Phoenix, Arizona, and was buried at the Yavapai-Prescott Tribal Cemetery on the reservation. Posthumously, she was inducted into the Arizona Women's Hall of Fame in 2006, after being nominated by Supreme Court Justice Sandra Day O'Connor.

Preceded by Don S. Mitchell	Chair/President of the Prescott Yavapais; 1972-1988	Succeeded by Stanhope Rice, Jr.
Preceded by Stanhope Rice, Jr.	President of the Prescott Yavapais; 1990-1994	Succeeded by Stanhope Rice, Jr.
