= Roberta Blackgoat =

Native American activist, public speaker, writer, environmentalist and artist

Roberta Blackgoat (October 15, 1917 – 23 April 2002) was a Native American activist, public speaker, writer, environmentalist, and artist. Blackgoat is best known for her political activism in opposition to the American federal government's Navajo Relocation Program.

== Early life and education ==
Roberta Blackgoat was born on October 15, 1917, into the Navajo (or Diné) tribe and spent the length of her life in the area around Big Mountain, Arizona (near Thin Rock Mesa) on the Navajo Reservation.

She attended a boarding school in Kings Canyon until ninth grade, when she began attending the Phoenix Indian School.

== The Navajo Relocation Program ==
The Navajo Reservation was established by the Treaty of 1868 and encompasses over 27,413 square miles, expanding its area over three states. The Hopi and Navajo tribes had "joint use" in the 2.5 million acre region in Arizona until 1963, when the federal government divided out 600,000 acres exclusively for use by the Hopi. The 1974 Navajo-Hopi Land Settlement Act (PL 93-351) led to the joint use area being further divided in 1977 into separate areas for Hopi and Navajo people, and the intensification of the government's forced relocation efforts.

While less than 100 Hopi people lived on the Navajo Partitioned Land (NPL) side, thousands of Navajo people lived on the Hopi Partitioned Land (HPL) side. Studies of the Navajo people who were forced to relocate have found many negative outcomes related to mental health, family and community cohesion, and economic status. While the official reasoning for the division was conflicts between the Navajo and Hopi people, some believe that gaining access to the low-sulfur coal in the Black Mesa below Big Mountain was a motive for certain actors involved in the dispute.

== Activism ==
Roberta Blackgoat fought tirelessly for the human rights of her people as well as all living things. She is best known for her refusal to relocate out of the Navajo Reservation after federal orders. Over the years she spoke publicly in various forums around the United States and Europe to fight for Native American Rights. She spoke against issues that were not always talked about such as, "the mining of uranium, coal, natural gas, and the taking away of water supplies" from Native Americans.

== Awards ==
Blackgoat won various awards through the course of her life as a result of her activism for her tribe and Native American people.

- Indigenous Woman of the Year
- The Martin Luther King Award

== Late life ==
Roberta Blackgoat died on April 23, 2002, at the age of 84. She is survived by her three daughters Sheilah Keith, Bessie Manygoats, and Vicki Blackgoat, and her two sons Danny and Harry Blackgoat.
