= Mary Morez =

Navajo painter (1946–2004)

- Born: January 16, 1946 near Tuba City, Arizona, U.S.
- Died: September 25, 2004 (aged 58)
- Education: Phoenix Indian School, University of Arizona, Ray Vogue Art School
- Known for: Painting, textile art, "Mary Morez Style"
- Style: Combination of traditional Navajo elements with contemporary, abstract style
- Movement: Modernism, Native American art

Mary Morez (January 16, 1946 – September 25, 2004) was a Navajo painter.

Born near Tuba City, Arizona, Morez was stricken with both polio and rheumatic fever as a girl, and underwent numerous operations as a result before being adopted by Lawrence and Mary Keim. She first studied at the Phoenix Indian School before receiving a bachelor's degree from the University of Arizona and she received a scholarship to study fashion illustration at the Ray Vogue Art School in Chicago. In 1969, she chose to devote her work to full-time painting instead of commercial art. Allan Houser and Oscar Howe served as her mentors early in life. Her work combined traditional Navajo elements with a more contemporary, abstract style. Besides painting Morez also worked as a textile artist. For much of her career she lived in Phoenix, Arizona. Morez is represented in the collection of the Wheelwright Museum of the American Indian.

== Biography ==
Mary Morez was born on January 16, 1946. Aside from art, she was known to write books, record jackets, posters and health care publications for the U.S. Indian Health Service. She was an art consultant for the Wheelwright Museum of the American Indian and a curator at the Heard Museum of Phoenix, Arizona. Morez also was an illustrator, fashion designer, graphic artist, draftswoman, and museum curator. An accomplished Native American artist, Morez merged Navajo artistic traditions with modernism in what is known as the "Mary Morez Style".

== Education ==
After Morez came back from Chicago to Phoenix due to a polio-related surgery, she graduated from Phoenix Indian School in 1960. Morez graduated in 1963 in which she went on to work as a fashion illustrator and draftsman until she wanted to paint full-time in 1969. Around the 1960s, Morez received a scholarship from the Southwestern Indian Art Project (SWIAP), in which influenced and boosted her artistic abilities and development.

== Artwork ==
In the center of Morez's art practice if her deep connection of the Navajo life, family, and culture and her work shows and celebrates the Navajo chronicle and contemporary indigenous feminine discourse. Her art was known as the "Mary Morez Style" which integrated Navajo artistic traditions with modernism and semi-abstraction. Her artwork also consisted of many varieties of stylized paintings or realistic paintings of Navajo daily life.

=== Children of the Great Spirit ===
One of her artworks is called "Children of the Great Spirit" (1990–1995) which depicts a painting of collection of animals such as a snake, lady bug, snail, a skeleton fish, a grasshopper, and a scorpion.

=== Navajo Migration ===
Another artwork she created from watercolor paint is called "Navajo Migration" (1994) that shows many Navajos from different age ranges migrating by foot while carrying bags and babies through the desert, followed by nine soldiers on horseback.

=== Painting ===
Through painting and graphite, Morez created "Painting" (1973) which depicts a woman with long hair and a dress on kneeling on the ground.

=== Crow Mother ===
Made in 1991 with cotton canvas and acrylic paint, this painting depicts the Crow Mother named Kachina, Andwusnasomtaka wearing a feathered headdress and a robe while holding a bowl of corn.

== Select exhibitions ==
=== Solo exhibitions ===
- The Mary Morez Style: Transformations of the Tradition

The Wheelwright Museum of the American Indian has an exhibition of Mary Morez called "The Mary Morez Style: Transformations of the Tradition" in the Schultz Gallery that opened on October 8, 2022, through April 15, 2023. In this exhibition, it explores the broadness of Morez's creativeness, as well as her leadership in changing Native art traditions into global contemporary art canon.

- Drawings by Mary Morez: an Alcove Exhibit: Heard Museum in 2001 - June 2002
- Mary Morez "From Kandinsky to Navajo Tradition: Phoenix gallery in 1993
- Mary Morez: Gomes Gallery
- Mary Morez: Navajo Tribal Museum, opened in October 1, 1983
- Drawings and Paintings by Mary Morez: Gallery of Indian Art in May 2, 1970 - June 30, 1970

=== Group exhibitions ===
- Remembering the Future: 100 Years of Inspiring Art: Heard Museum in October 24, 2021-January 2, 2023.
- Something Old, Something New, Nothing Borrowed: Heard Museum in April 2, 2011- March 18, 2012
- Illustrious: American Indian Artists' Books and Illustrations: Heard Museum on March 27, 2010 - August 1, 2010
- Beyond Face Value: Heard Museum on April 18, 2009 - October 4, 2009
- Beautiful Resistance II: Heard Museum in December 2005 - June 2006
- Beautiful Resistance: Heard Museum on May 22, 2005 - December 2005
- Drawings by Mary Morez: an Alcove Exhibit: Heard Museum in 2001 - June 2002
- Recent Acquisitions from the Herman and Claire Bloom Collection: Heard Museum on January 11, 1997 - July 1997
- For the Love of It: the Albion & Lynne Fenderson Collection: Heard Museum on April 17, 1993 - May 22, 1994
- Shared Visions: Native American Painters and Sculptors in the Twentieth Century: Heard Museum on April 13, 1991 - July 28, 1991
- Paintings by Mary Morez (Navajo) and Frank La Pena (Wintu): Pacific Western Traders on January 5, 1991 - February 28, 1991
- Paintings of Mary Morez, Stephen Juharos, Charles Stewart, and Vladin Stiha: Sombrero Playhouse Galaxy Gallery
- Traditional and Contemporary Tribal Arts: Pacific Western Traders in Spring 1990
- 18th Anniversary Show: Pacific Western Traders on September 9, 1989 - November 12, 1989
- Changing Women: Matrix Gallery on February 4–26, 1989
- Fall Show: Pacific Western Traders on November 5, 1988 - December 4, 1988
- Women Who Create: an Invitational Exhibition of Arizona Artists: Coconino Center for the Arts on May 10, 1985 - June 16, 1985
- Pacific Western Traders Tenth Anniversary (1971-1981) Exhibitionoin October 1, 1981 - end of 1981
- Mary Morez and Sculpture by Gordon Van Wert: Nadler's Indian Arts held on February 17, 1980
- Paintings by Mary Morez and Jewelry by Duane Maktima: Nadler's Indian Arts on February 19, 1779 - March 3, 1979
- Contemporary Native American Artists: Humboldt Cultural Center on March 3, 1976 - April 10, 1976
