= Stanley Bahe =

Native American painter

Stanley K. Bahe
- Born: 1935
- Citizenship: Navajo Nation, American
- Education: Phoenix Indian School
- Occupation: painter

Stanley K. Bahe (born 1935) is a Navajo painter. He studied at the Phoenix Indian School and has exhibited his work across the country, including at the Philbrook Museum of Art in Tulsa.

Bahe painted with watercolors. Some of his works have been included in publications such as Arizona Highways magazine.
