= Frank Austin (artist) =

American Navajo painter (1937–2017)

- Bahah Zhonie
- Born: March 1937; Tsegi Canyon, Arizona, U.S.
- Died: March 2, 2017 (aged 79–80); Albuquerque, New Mexico, U.S.
- Citizenship: American, Diné
- Education: Santa Fe Indian School
- Occupation: painter

Frank Austin (March 1937 – March 2, 2017), also called Bahah Zhonie ("Happy Boy" in Navajo), was an American Navajo painter and textile artist.

== Early life and career ==
Frank Austin was born in Tsegi Canyon, Arizona in March 1937, under the Navajo Salt Clan. He has exhibited his work across the country, and is known for his silkscreen designs and textile paintings. Some of his works are in the permanent collection of institutions including the Smithsonian National Museum of the American Indian.

Austin's work included portraits, landscapes, and depictions of wildlife. He worked for a time under Lloyd H. New as a textile artist at Kiva Fashion-Creative. In 1970 he opened a textile business, Nizhonie Fabrics, in Cortez, Colorado, offering hand-printed textiles.

== Personal life and death ==
Austin was one of eight children of Buck and Martha Smallcanyon Austin. He studied at the Phoenix Indian School, graduating in 1958. He then attended Arizona State University and the University of Arizona as the recipient of a Southwest Indian Art Scholarship, as well as a Rockefeller Scholarship.

In 1960, Austin married Rose L. Adajie, and they had three children. Frank Austin died in Albuquerque, New Mexico on March 2, 2017.
