= Minerva J. Chapman =

American painter

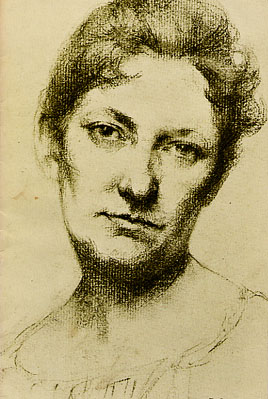
- Minerva J. Chapman, Self-portrait, undated
- Born: December 6, 1858; Sand Bank, now Altmar, New York
- Died: June 14, 1947 (aged 88); Palo Alto, California
- Education: The School of the Art Institute of Chicago, Académie Julian
- Known for: Painter
- Movement: Impressionist
- Elected: First woman president of the International Art Union

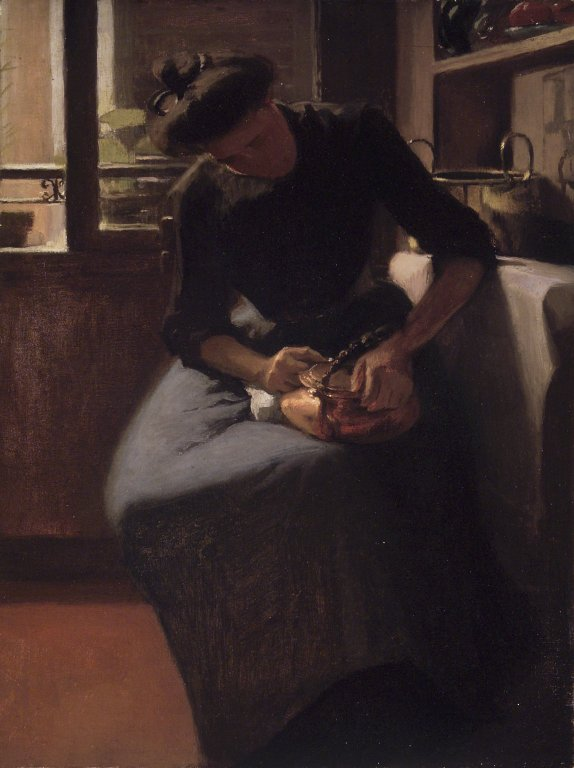
Minerva J. Chapman, Woman Polishing a Kettle

Minerva Josephine Chapman (1858–1947) was an American painter. She was known for her work in miniature portraiture, landscape, and still life.

== Early life ==
Minerva Josephine Chapman was born December 6, 1858, in Sand Bank, now called Altmar, New York. Her parents were Josephine and James L. Chapman. Nicknamed Minnie, she grew up on Vernon Avenue in Chicago, Illinois. She had younger brothers Wilbert, Irving and James and a younger sister, Blanche.

== Education ==
Chapman was financially able to live an independent life and pursue college and art education due to her father's success as a banker and tannery owner. At the same time, women were allowed entry into prestigious art academies in the United States and in France.

She studied at the Mount Holyoke College where she was in the junior class in 1867 and in the graduating class of 1878 In 1875 she attended the University of Chicago. Between 1880 and 1886 she studied privately with Annie C. Shaw and then with John Vanderpoel at The School of the Art Institute of Chicago. During that time she also traveled and was educated in the eastern United States.

Chapman went to Switzerland, Holland, Belgium and Paris in 1886 and studied with Georg Jocobedis in Munich, Germany. She and her sister Blanche moved to Paris and Chapman attended Académie Julian before deciding to take private lessons from Charles Augustus Lasar, who encouraged Impressionist painting of still lifes and plein air landscapes. While in Paris, Chapman also studied between 1887 and 1897 with Raphaël Collin, Gustave-Claude-Etienne Courtois, Tony Robert-Fleury, and William-Adolphe Bouguereau.

== Career ==
Chapman made portraits, miniatures on ivory and canvas, landscapes and genre paintings. She resided for much of her career in Paris with interspersed travel to Chicago, such as in 1893 when she exhibited The Village Church at the Woman's Building at the 1893 World's Columbian Exposition in Chicago, Illinois. Three of her oil paintings were shown at a Chicago Institute of Art exhibition in 1898. Two were portraits of women and the other was an interior painting of a studio.

She was elected as a member of the Salon of the Société Nationale des Beaux-Arts in 1906. In January 1908 she exhibited 34 miniatures at the Art Institute of Chicago Exhibition of 1907 to 1908. She was a member beginning in 1909 and was the first women president in 1914 of the International Art Union.

At the beginning of World War I, Chapman traveled from Liverpool, England, aboard the SS New York in September 1914, ultimately bound for Arlington Heights in Illinois. By that time she had lived for 21 years in Paris, with trips to Chicago. During the war she lived in Chicago, Illinois and San Diego, California. She returned to Paris in 1919, intending to stay two years. She declared that year that she had never been married. She captured the 19th century independent, educated New Woman in her paintings, as described in the article Minerva J. Chapman's Miniatures: Costume and the New Woman.

Her oil painting, Garden of the Tuileries, Paris is in the Smithsonian American Art Museum collection. Chapman's work is also in the collections of the Mount Holyoke College, National Museum of Women in the Arts in Washington, D.C., and the Luxembourg Museum in Paris.

Her paintings have been exhibited at the Art Institute of Chicago. In New York City, her paintings were exhibited at the Society of American Artists, American Society of Miniature Painters, and the Society of American Artists. In London at the Royal Academy of Art and in Paris at the Paris Salon de la Societe Nationale des Beaux-Arts, International Art Union Lodge, American Women's Art Association, American Women's Club, and the American Art Students Club. In addition to her exhibition at the 1893 World's Fair in Chicago, she also exhibited at the San Francisco Panama-Pacific Exposition in 1915 and 1916, where she won gold medals. Her paintings were exhibited at the National Academy of Design in Washington, D.C., and other places in the United States.

In 1925 she moved to Palo Alto, California, and continued to paint until 1932 when she quit due to poor eyesight. Chapman died June 14 or June 16, 1947 in Palo Alto at the age of 88.

== Legacy ==
A retrospective of her works was held at the Wortsman Rowe Galleries from January 18 to February 16, 1974, and in 1986 at the art museum of her alma mater, Mount Holyoke College.

Thirty of the 181 miniatures that Chapman made were exhibited at "Off the Pedestal: New Women in the Art of Homer, Chase, and Sargent" the Frick Art Museum in 2006. "New Women" were educated, capable women following the American Civil War. In 2007 her works were part of a traveling exhibition of students of William-Adolphe Bouguereau, including Robert Henri, Cecilia Beaux, Anna Elizabeth Klumpke, Eanger Irving Couse, and Elizabeth Jane Gardner.
