= Viola Jimulla =

Chief of Yavapai Prescott Tribe (1878–1966)

- Sica-tuva, "Born Quickly," Who-wah, "Singing Cricket", Ka-hava-soo-ah, "Turquoise Bead in Nose"
- Jimulla circa 1960

Prescott Yavapai chair
- Preceded by: Sam "Red Ants" Jimulla
- Succeeded by: Grace Mitchell and Lucy Miller

Personal details
- Born: 1878 San Carlos Apache Indian Reservation
- Died: December 7, 1966 (aged 87–88)
- Spouse: Sam "Red Ants" Jimulla
- Children: Daughters: Daisy (1902-1902); Grace (Mrs. Don) Mitchell (1902-1976); Lucy (Mrs. Jim) Miller (1906-1984); Amy Vaughn Gazzam (1912-1940) and Rosie (1913-1914); She also raised her grandchildren: Patricia (Vaughn) McGee (1926-1994) and Theodore M. Vaughn (1928-2012)
- Parent(s): Stepfather, Mr. Phelhame

Viola Jimulla (1878 – December 7, 1966) was the Chief of the Prescott Yavapai tribe. She became Chief when her husband, who was also a Chief of the tribe, died in an accident in 1940. She remained Chief until her death. She was known for improving living conditions, and for her work with the Presbyterian Church.

== Biography ==
Viola Jimulla was born in 1878 on the San Carlos Apache Reservation. She was named Sica-tuva, "Born Quickly," by her parents, Who-wah, "Singing Cricket" and Ka-hava-soo-ah, "Turquoise Bead in Nose." When attending Rice Indian School and the Phoenix Indian School she took the name Viola and her stepfather’s last name, Phelhame. Her father had died when she was young.

In 1900, Phelhame went to live with her family in the vicinity of Prescott. In 1901, she married Sam “Red Ants” Jimulla, raised a family, and became an active part of the tribal community as well as the Prescott community. The Jimullas had five daughters, three of whom died young.

Viola added in her own energy and action to her husband’s quiet leadership. Her ability to care for and work with both the Indian and Anglo cultures would have a long lasting benefit for her tribe and for the greater Prescott area. In 1935, the Jimullas worked with local and national officials to set aside 75 acres (300,000 m^{2}) of land for the Prescott-Yavapai Indian Reservation. In the 1950s, the reservation was enlarged to 1,327 acres (5.37 km^{2}). That same year Sam was appointed chief of the Prescott Yavapais by the Commissioner of Indian Affairs and was officially elected chief by the tribe.

== Career as chief ==
After Sam’s accidental death in 1940, Viola became Chieftess of the Prescott Yavapai Native American tribe. For twenty-six years, until her death on December 7, 1966, Viola guided her tribe with wisdom and kindness. Her leadership helped the Yavapais achieve better living conditions and more modern facilities than most other tribes.

Jimulla's personal strengths and skills helped her people adapt and grow with the surrounding Anglo community. Although Jimulla formed a bridge between the two cultures, Anglo and Indian, she still honored the traditions of her tribe. Not only was Jimulla a great leader for her tribe, she was also influential in religious matters. She was the first Yavapai to be baptized into the Presbyterian Church. In 1922, she and others of her tribe revitalized the Yavapai Indian Mission to become the Presbyterian Mission. Jimulla served the mission as an elder, a Sunday School superintendent, and an interpreter. In 1950, she became a commissioner to the General Assembly of the United Presbyterian Church in Cincinnati where she made a speech on behalf of the mission. In 1951, the mission became an organized church and later, in 1957, it was reorganized as the Trinity Presbyterian Church which recognized the three founding entities – the new Presbyterians in Prescott, the founding church, and the Presbyterian Indian people.

Under Jimulla’s leadership, The Prescott Yavapai Tribal Council was formed to better ensure the people's voice in their own governing. Jimulla's descendants continued to guide her people. Two of her daughters, Grace Mitchell and Lucy Miller, became chieftess in the years following their mother's death. In 1986, Viola was elected to the Arizona Women’s Hall of Fame. A statue of Viola teaching basketry to a young Yavapai is in the lobby of the Prescott Resort and Conference Center. The young girl in the statue is her granddaughter Patricia McGee, who, in 1972, became tribal president.

| Preceded by Sam Jimulla | Chief of the Prescott Yavapais; 1940-1966 | Succeeded by Grace Mitchell (1966-1976) and Lucy Miller(1976-1984) |
