= Anna Moore Shaw =

Native American writer from Arizona (1898–1975)

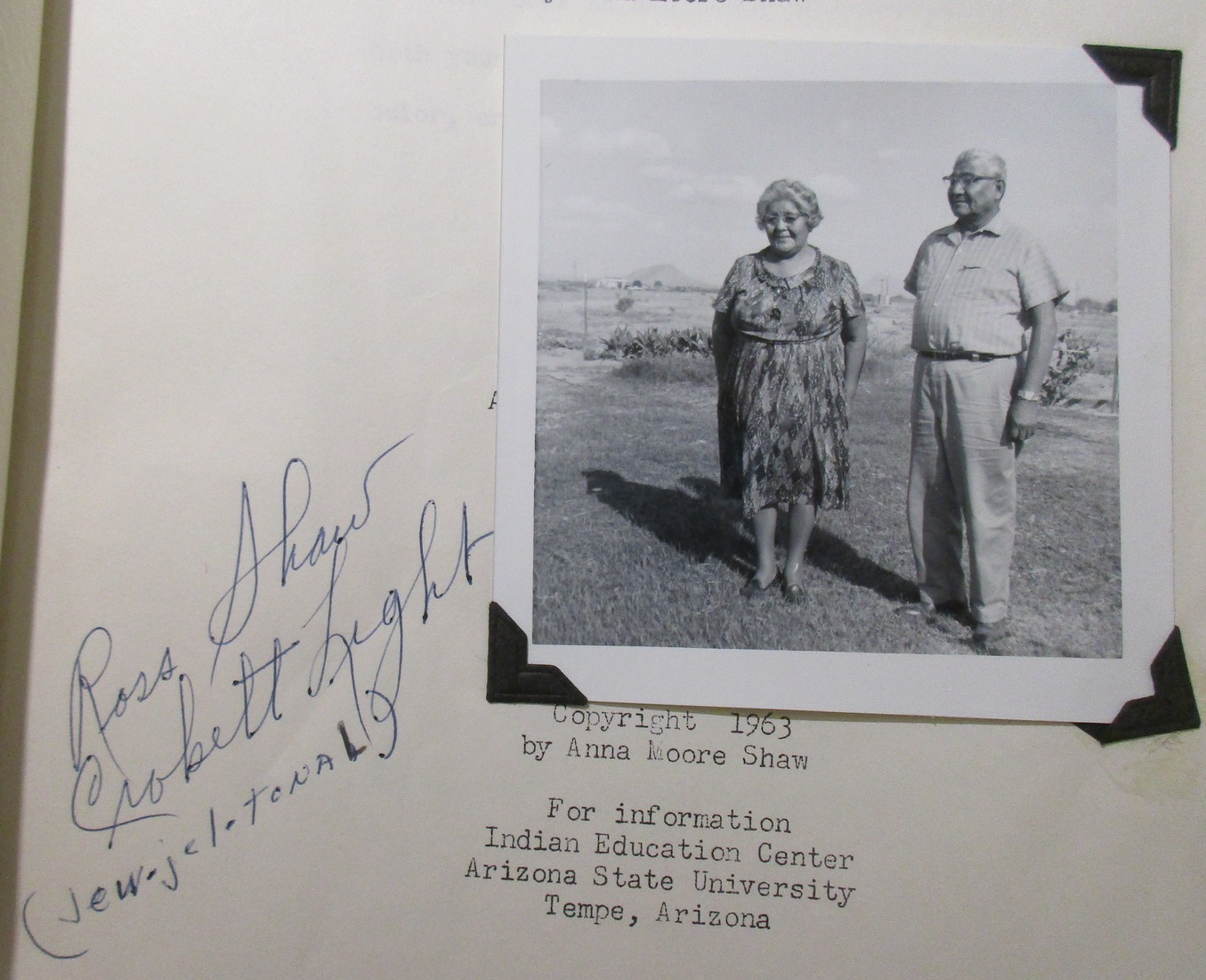
- Ross and Anna Moore Shaw in 1963
- Born: Chehia; November 30, 1898
- Died: April 18, 1976 (aged 77)
- Citizenship: Gila River Indian Community, United States
- Education: Phoenix Indian School, Phoenix Union High School
- Spouse: Ross Shaw
- Children: Roderick, Adeline, and William
- Parent(s): Josiah (Red Arrow) Moore (Father), Rose (Haus Molly) Moore (Mother)

Anna Moore Shaw (November 30, 1898 — April 18, 1976) was an Akimel O'odham storyteller, autobiographer, and civic leader. She is the first Native American woman to earn a high school diploma in Arizona. She was incredibly active in the Akimel O'odham (Pima), Piipaash (Maricopa), and the combined Salt River Pima–Maricopa Indian Community. Her generation is the first to grow up with both Pima traditions as well as Christianity, which shaped her activism and involvement in both the Church Women United Group, and the Salt and Gila River Reservations.

== Early life ==
Moore Shaw's birth name was Chehia, and she was the youngest of 11 children of Red Arrow and Haus Molly. She was raised "in the shadow of the Estrella Mountains" on the Gila River Indian Reservation, located in south-central Arizona, adjacent to the south side of Phoenix.

Gila River Indian Reservation, where Anna Moore Shaw was born and raised.

Moore Shaw's father, nicknamed "the Unbeliever," was one of the last of the Akimel O'odham to convert to Christianity before her birth. Upon converting, he changed his name to Josiah Moore. Moore recalls the Presbyterian Church becoming an important aspect of Pima life, following the missionary trip of Charles H. Cook to the Gila River Reservation in 1870, in her autobiography, A Pima Past. As Moore Shaw grew up, her father insisted she and her siblings learn English and attend boarding school.

From 1908-18 she attended the Phoenix Indian School, where she was roommates with Helen Sekaquaptewa, a Hopi writer, for three years. At age 14, she met Ross Shaw at the Phoenix Indian School, whom she later married. In 1916, they were separated when Ross went to fight in World War I to serve with the Arizona National Guard. In 1920, Moore became the first woman to graduate from the Phoenix Indian School. She married Ross Shaw, and they moved into his parents' home for a month, in accordance with Akimel O'odham tradition. The couple later moved to Phoenix when Ross Shaw got a job with the Santa Fe Railroad. They raised their three children, Roderick, Adeline, and William in Phoenix but were regularly visited by friends and family from Gila and Salt River Reservations.

== Activism ==
Salt River Reservation, where Anna Moore and Ross Shaw lived upon moving back from Phoenix.

During a visit with Carlos Montezuma, she was moved to challenge racial prejudice and countered racism in Phoenix by moving into white neighborhoods, joining the Parent-teacher association (PTA) and Church Women United, which previously had no people of color as members. Church Women United became a large influence in Shaw's life. In 1958, Shaw became the first female elder in the Central Christian Presbyterian Church in Phoenix.

Moore Shaw had begun writing down stories in 1930, when she realized they would otherwise become lost and wanted to make sure her children, raised in white society, knew Akimel O'odham stories. From 1950 to 1952, Moore Shaw studied Writing for Publication at the Phoenix Technical School. In 1963, the early stories were published in mimeographed form at the Indian Education Center of Arizona State University. By 1968, her friends at Church Women United encouraged her to publish the book. She published it as Pima Indian Legends. Moore Shaw was then encouraged to write an autobiography titled A Pima Past, with a focus on her Akimel O'odham roots, in 1974. Her works serve as important documentation of oral traditions of Pima culture, activities, beliefs, creation, and overall way of life. A section of the Salt River Pima-Maricopa Indian Community's website is dedicated to the first chapter of A Pima Past.

The two publications focused on the Pima traditions Anna Moore Shaw hoped to preserve for future generations. Her first publication, Pima Indian Legends highlights traditional short stories that were passed down through generations in Akimel O'odham language. Due to the rough translation from the native language, Shaw opted to use English "Indian terms" to convey the meaning of the stories. For example, she often used "many moons" and "great spirit" because she believed the direct translation would be meaningless or out of place. In her autobiography, Moore recounts her family history, beginning with the history of the Pima people dating back to 300 B.C. The choice to begin not with the start of Anna Moore Shaw's life, but the start of her people and family makes her autobiography unique from other Native American autobiographies. The story follows her ancestors and ultimately her life and accomplishments by her 70s. Her writing is a unique blend of poetic and literary styles that highlight the storyline of the text.

== Legacy ==
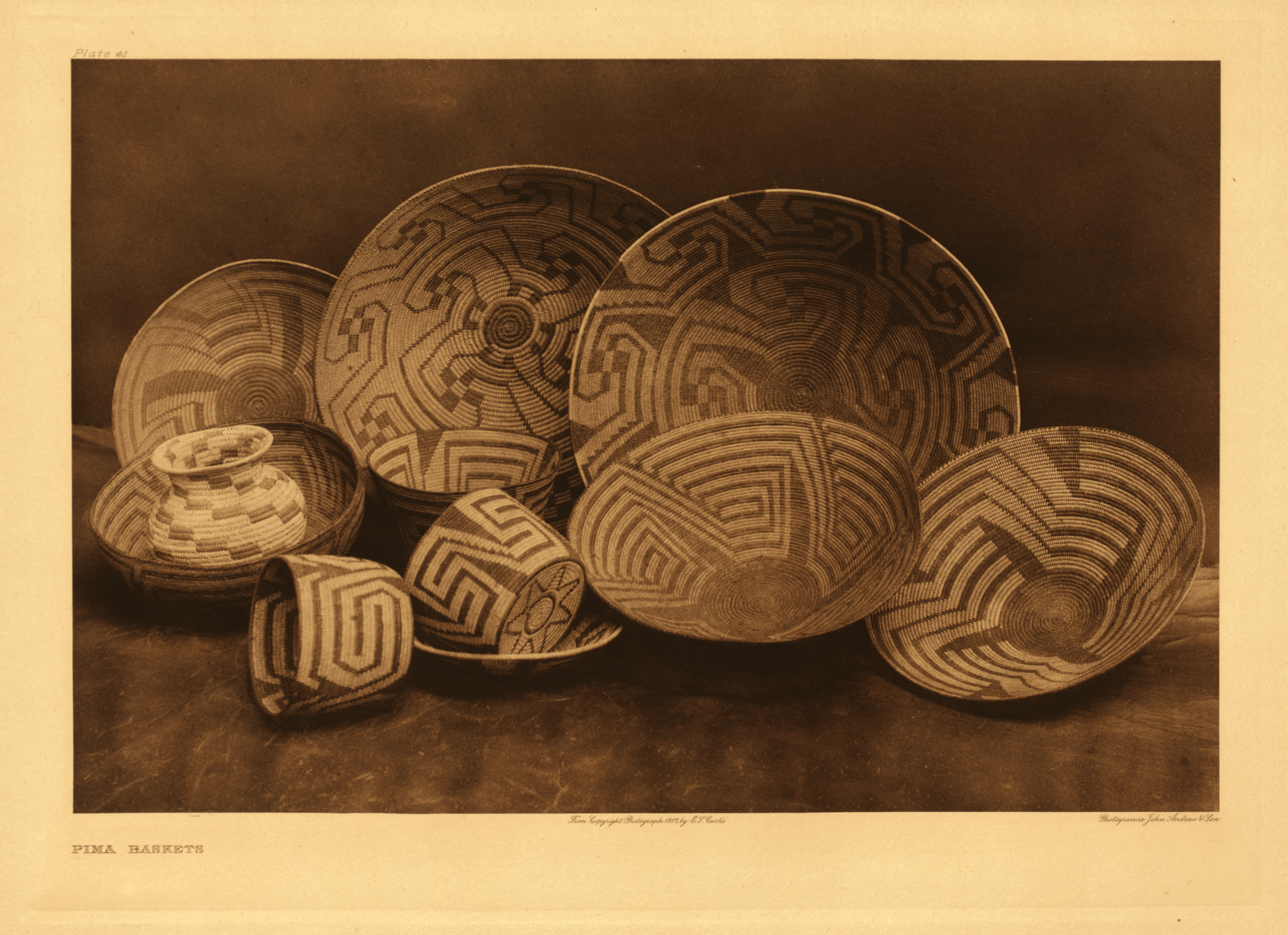
Akimel Oʼodham coiled baskets, c. 1907, photography by Edward S. Curtis

Moore Shaw and her husband retired and returned to the Akimel O'odham's Salt River Indian Reservation, where she immediately began community work to improve reservation conditions and daily life. Her family recalls that she was always found carrying around a notepad and pen to record stories, and could be found writing late at night.

In the 1960s, Moore Shaw became the editor of the tribal newspaper, Pima Letters. She founded the Aid to the Elderly program in 1966 to give back to the Akimel O'odham elders through improved housing. Serving as well on the C.H. Cook Christian Training School and the Salt River Reservation Mutual Self-Help Housing Commission to provide good homes for low-income residents, Moore Shaw was dedicated to making a difference. Her legacy is one of defiance. She defied the racial barriers that tried to separate white and American Indian people. She defied the erasure of her Pima culture and knowledge. She also taught Akimel O'odham youth basket weaving as she described the character 'Dawn' learned in A Pima Past. Growing up with a Pima teacher, Shaw continued the tradition and taught daily kindergarten classes in the Akimel O'odham language. Moore Shaw was one of the founders of the reservation's museum, the Huhugam Ki: Museum, meaning "House of the Ancestors". The Salt River Pima-Maricopa Indian Community quotes A Pima Past as Moore Shaw describes the importance of keeping tribal pride alive despite assimilation.

"We women get together to weave baskets in the old designs, and we have started a museum where everyone can see the beautiful artifacts of our proud Pima-Maricopa heritage. But we can never go back to the old way of life. The white man and his cities surround us – we must embrace those of his ways which are good while keeping our pride in being Indians."

Shaw died on April 18, 1976 at the age of 77. In 1981, she was among the first women inducted into the Arizona Women's Hall of Fame.

== Bibliography ==
Pima Indian Legends. Tucson: University of Arizona Press, 1968. OCLC 646586563

A Pima Past. Tucson: University of Arizona Press, 1974. OCLC 947666
