= Ann Shaw (social worker) =

American social worker

- Born: November 21, 1921; Columbus, Ohio
- Died: May 5, 2015 (aged 93); Los Angeles, California
- Other names: Margaret Ann White, Margaret Ann Shaw
- Occupations: Social worker, civic leader
- Known for: pioneer for women and minorities to hold leadership positions

Ann Shaw (November 21, 1921 – May 5, 2015) was an American social worker and civic leader based in Los Angeles for five decades. Shaw was a leader of the YWCA of the Greater Los Angeles for two terms and the first African American to head the organization and the first woman and first African American to serve on the California Commission on Judicial Performance.

== Biography ==
Born as Margaret Ann White in Columbus, Ohio, on November 21, 1921, to P. Daniel White and Sarah Roberts White. Her father owned a funeral home during a time when there was very few African American owned businesses and her mother was active in the local Episcopal Church and a segregated branch of the YWCA. Shaw attended University of Redlands and graduated in 1943 with a degree in speech and by 1944 she graduated from Ohio State University (OSU) with a master's degree in speech. She met her husband, Leslie Nelson Shaw Sr. (1922–1985) at OSU and they were married in 1947.

She had difficulty finding work in the field of speech and turned to working volunteer positions. In 1963, John F. Kennedy appointed her husband Leslie Shaw to be the first African American postmaster (working in Los Angeles), and at that time Ann Shaw began serving as the YWCA president.

In 1965, after the Watts riots she helped lead a committee to ease tensions in the local Los Angeles schools. In response to her experience working in schools after the riots, she was aspired to take more classes in the field of social work. She attended the University of Southern California (USC) and graduated in 1968 receiving a Masters of Social Work (MSW).

In 1975 she was appointed by the Governor of California, Jerry Brown, as the first woman and first African American to serve on the California Commission on Judicial Performance.

Shaw served on many boards, including Boys and Girls Club of Southern California, Loyola Law School Board of Visitors, California Medical Center Foundation, the California Community Foundation, the University of Redlands, the UCLA Medical School Board of Visitors, Lloyds Bank and what is now the Charles R. Drew University of Medicine and Science.

She died on May 5, 2015, at age 93 in Los Angeles.

In 1979, the City of Los Angeles dedicated Leslie Shaw Park to her late husband, located at 2nd Avenue and Jefferson Boulevard.
