= Annie C. Shaw =

American painter

Annie Cornelia Shaw (September 16, 1852- August 31, 1887) was an American landscape painter.

== Biography ==
Annie C. Shaw was born in West Troy, New York and grew up in Chicago, Illinois. She studied with painter Henry Ford and was elected an Associate of the Chicago Academy of Design in 1873. Shaw exhibited a painting, Illinois Prairie, at the Philadelphia Centennial Exposition in 1876. That same year she was elected an Academician by the Chicago Academy of Design. She was the first woman to earn this status.

Shaw's style was influenced by the Barbizon school of painters. She often painted en plein air, traveling the country to paint the Adirondack Mountains, the coast of Maine, and the Western prairies.

Shaw was a well-respected art teacher in Chicago, and among her students was painter Minerva J. Chapman.

Her paintings were shown at the Pennsylvania Academy, the Metropolitan Museum of Art, and the Boston Museum of Fine Arts. Shaw was elected an honorary Associate of the Chicago Art Institute in 1886, and the museum acquired two of her paintings in the 1890s. Those paintings were later sold into private collections.

Annie C. Shaw died in August 1887 in Chicago.
