= Yavapai-Prescott Tribe =

Federally recognized tribe in Arizona

Coordinates: 34°33′02″N 112°26′06″W

Yavapai-Prescott Indian Tribe
Wiikvteepaya (Havasupai–Hualapai)
- Location of the Yavapai-Prescott Indian Reservation

Total population
- under 200

Regions with significant populations

Languages
- Yavapai, English

Religion
- Indigenous religion, Christianity

Related ethnic groups
- other Yavapai people

The Yavapai-Prescott Indian Tribe (Yavapai language: Wiikvteepaya), formerly known as the Yavapai-Prescott Tribe of the Yavapai Reservation, a federally recognized tribe of Yavapai people. Fewer than 200 people are enrolled in the tribe.

== Reservation ==
The Yavapai reservation is approximately 1,413 acres (5.72 km^{2}) in central Yavapai County in west-central Arizona. In the early 1930s, Sam Jimulla and his wife Viola Jimulla, with community support, pushed the government to provide reservation lands for the tribe, as they had been unable to secure federal funds for a housing project. In 1935, 75 acres of the former Fort Whipple, Arizona were set aside as a reservation. Continued pressure from the tribe resulted in an additional 1320 acres being conferred on the tribe in 1956.

== Government ==
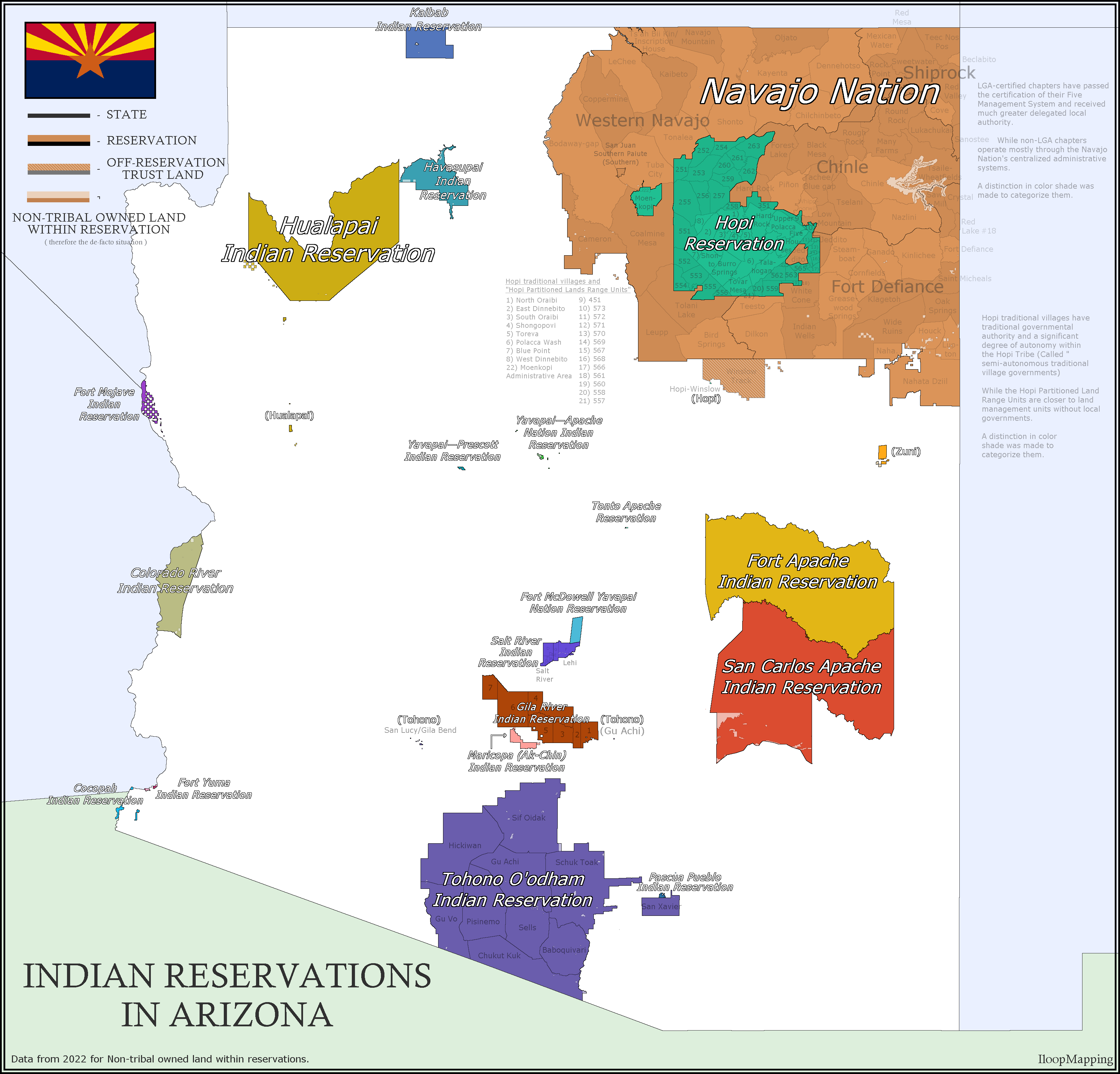
Map of the Yavapai-Prescott Tribe and neighboring tribes

Simultaneously with the creation of a reservation, the government pressed for the Prescott Yavapai to accept the terms of the Indian Reorganization Act, but the tribe rejected the move away from a hereditary chief and confirmed the commissioner of Indian Affairs choice of Jimulla as their tribal leader. When Jimulla died in 1940, he was succeeded by his wife, though a tribal council was established. Don Mitchell, husband of Jimulla's daughter Grace, served as chair of the tribal council from 1940 to 1948 and then tribal president from 1948 to 1972, though Viola served as Chieftess until her death. Grace Mitchell succeeded her parents as chieftess in 1967 and in 1972, Jimulla's granddaughter Patricia Ann McGee became tribal president. Upon Mitchell's death in 1976, the tribe conferred the title of chieftess upon Jimulla's other surviving daughter, Lucy Miller, and reconfirmed the dual governance system by retaining McGee as tribal president.

Following Miller's 1984 death the tribal leadership was solely vested in the council and the tribal president. McGee retained the post until 1988, when she was ousted for two years by Stanhope "Stan" Rice Jr. She regained leadership in 1990 and served until her death. Rice regained the presidency in 1994 and held the position until his ouster in 2001. He was succeeded by Ernest Jones Sr. The tribe is headquartered in Prescott, Arizona.

== Economic development ==
The tribe has a shopping center, two casinos, and a hotel where the reservation abuts State Highway 69 at Prescott, Arizona. A business park is on the reservation off State Highway 89 north of Prescott. The 2000 census reported a resident population of 182 persons on the Yavapai-Prescott Indian Reservation, 117 of whom were of solely Native American heritage.

== Services ==
Law enforcement services are provided by the Yavapai-Prescott Tribal Police Department.

== Charlie Ben Wilson ==
Historic Charlie Ben Wilson House

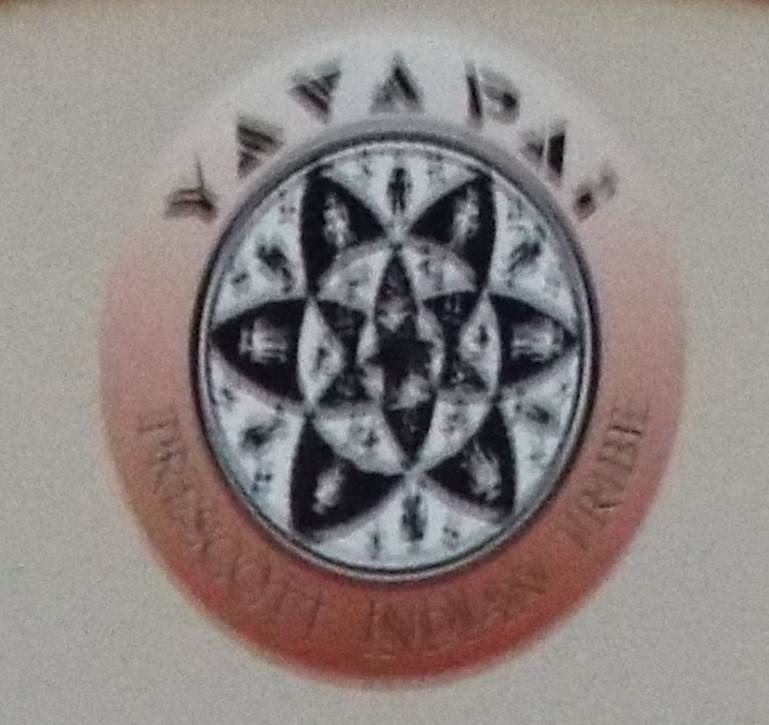
Yavapai-Prescott Tribe

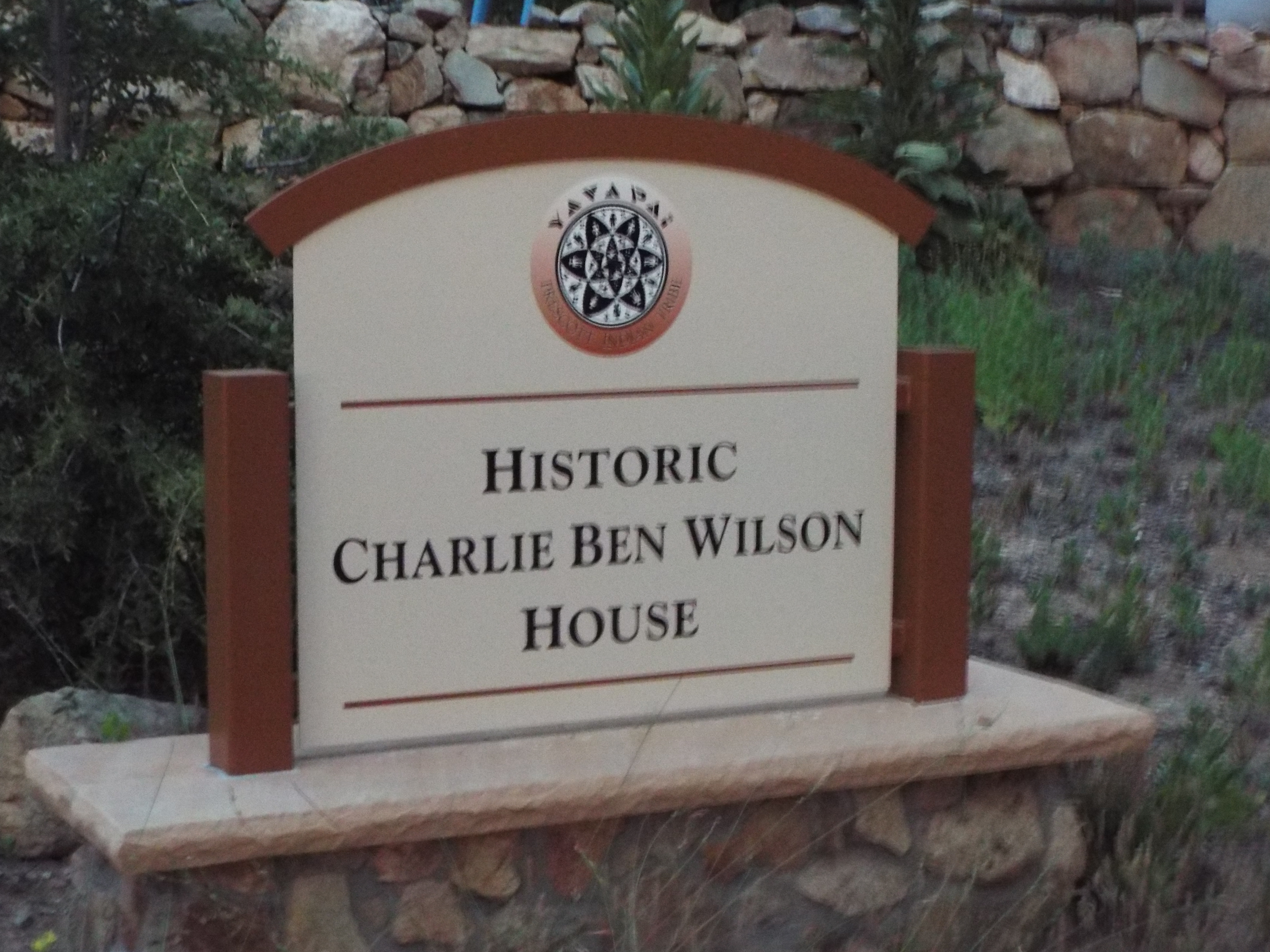
Charlie Ben Wilson Rock House marker

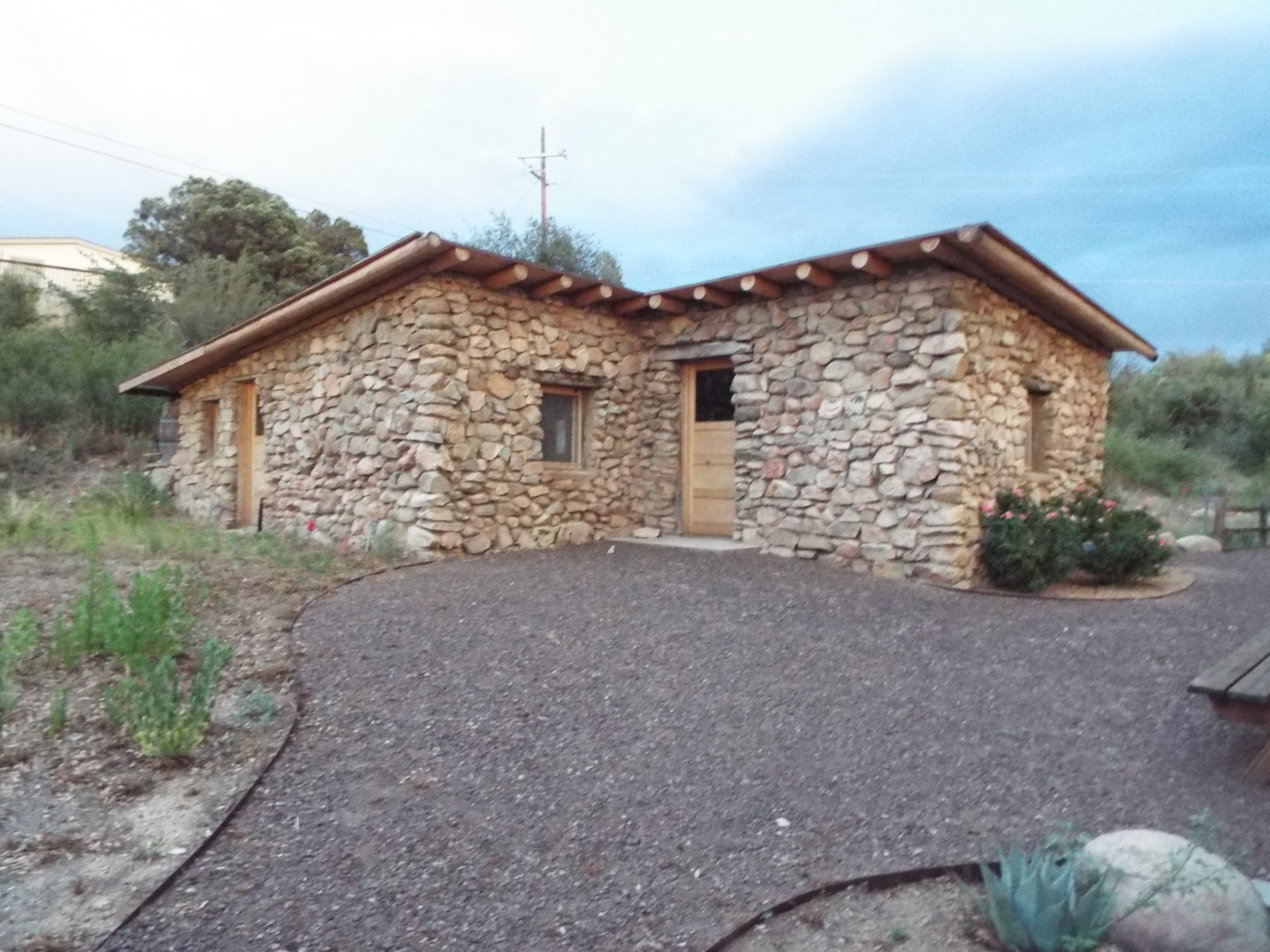
Historic Charlie Ben Wilson Rock House

== Notable tribal members ==
- Viola Jimulla (1878–1966), chief of the Prescott Yavapai from 1940 to 1966.

== Education ==
The reservation is served by the Prescott Unified School District.

== See also ==
- Yavapai people
