= Mayer Red Brick Schoolhouse =

United States historic place in Yavapai County, Arizona

- U.S. National Register of Historic Places
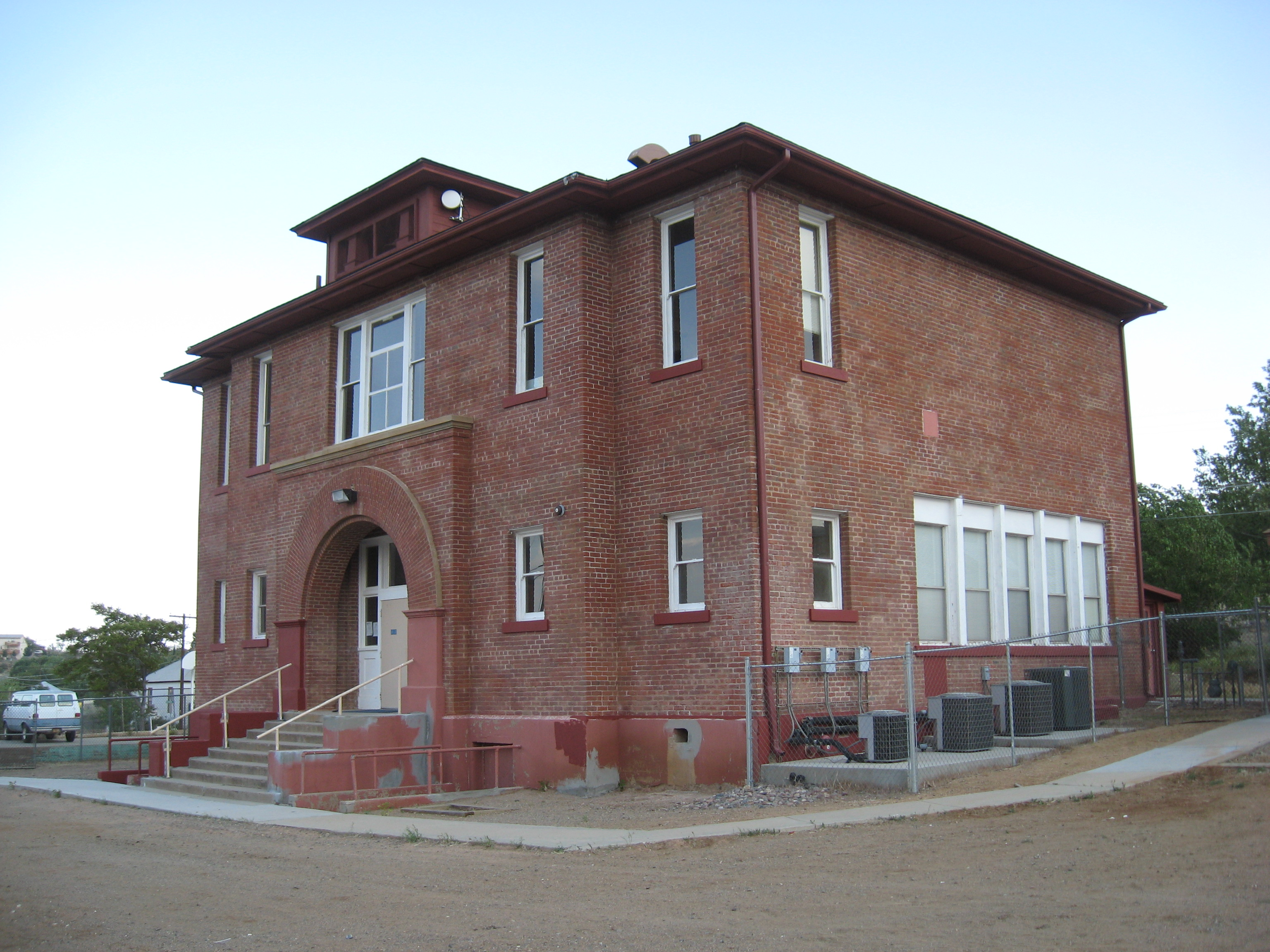
- Building in 2008

- Location within Arizona Location within the United States
- Location: Mayer, Arizona
- Coordinates: 34°24′0″N 112°14′24″W
- Built: 1914
- Built by: Jow Petit
- Architect: W.S. Elliott
- Architectural style: Schoolhouse
- Restored: 2003–2008
- Restored by: Mayer Unified School District
- NRHP reference No.: 04000719
- Added to NRHP: July 21, 2004

Mayer Red Brick Schoolhouse is a building in Mayer, Arizona. It was listed on the U.S. National Register of Historic Places in 2004. It is considered the longest used schoolhouse in Arizona, having been in operation for over eighty years. Due to its physical mass and prominent hillside location, it is "the most visible and identifiable building" in the small unincorporated town and the town's largest building.

It was designed by architect W.S. Elliott and constructed by Prescott, Arizona contractor Joe Petit for $9,000 to $10,000 on land donated by the town's founder, Joe Mayer. Since its completion in 1915, it was continuously used as a school, except for 1982–1987, until 2002 when it was condemned by the fire marshal. It became a fully accredited high school in the 1930s with the installation of indoor plumbing. It was not used as a high school after 1981. Elementary students continued to attend from 1988 to 2002. When constructed, the building faced the town's main street (called Main Street) but the street was later moved to the rear of the building. It also faced the tracks of the Prescott and Eastern Railroad until they were removed in 1949. After a historic restoration in the early 2000s, the building is now used for Mayer Unified School District administrative offices and as a Sheriff's substation.

== Characteristics ==
The building is a typical school building of the era in which it was built. It has a hipped roof and concrete foundation with walls at least 13 inches (330 mm) thick, many windows, and a bell tower on the roof. It has a prominent entrance on the north side featuring double doors with sidelights and a transom in an elaborate arched opening. Exterior walls are red brick, hence the name Red Brick Schoolhouse. The interior has maple-strip flooring and an oak staircase.

== History ==
School enrollment increased rapidly in the early 1910s, prompting the Yavapai County Superintendent of Schools to conclude that the existing school was overcrowded and a larger school building was needed. The citizens passed a municipal bond to pay for a new school. The new school was to be located on the site of the existing school, the hilltop location previously donated by Joe Mayer. This necessitated the moving of the existing wooden school. Construction of the new building began in 1914 and was completed the next year. The bricks used were made in Mayer. The building had coal-fired heating, a ventilation system, electric lights, and initially served eighty students in four classrooms. Three classrooms taught students in two or three grades and the fourth was for high school students (grades nine and ten initially and nine to twelve beginning in the 1930s). The first high school graduation took place on May 19, 1933, with two graduates.

The 1930s brought the addition of an outdoor basketball court built by the Yavapai County highway department and saw the building used for town entertainment as weekly movies were shown in the large second floor.

== Lunchroom ==
Local legend states that the building originally had no basement until local hard rock miners excavated under the completed building. They were motivated to do this in order to provide space for the students to eat as there was no other space for a lunchroom and the community had no funds for expansion. Their volunteer effort, thought impossible by some, was done over several months when they were not at work in the local mines.

== Restoration ==
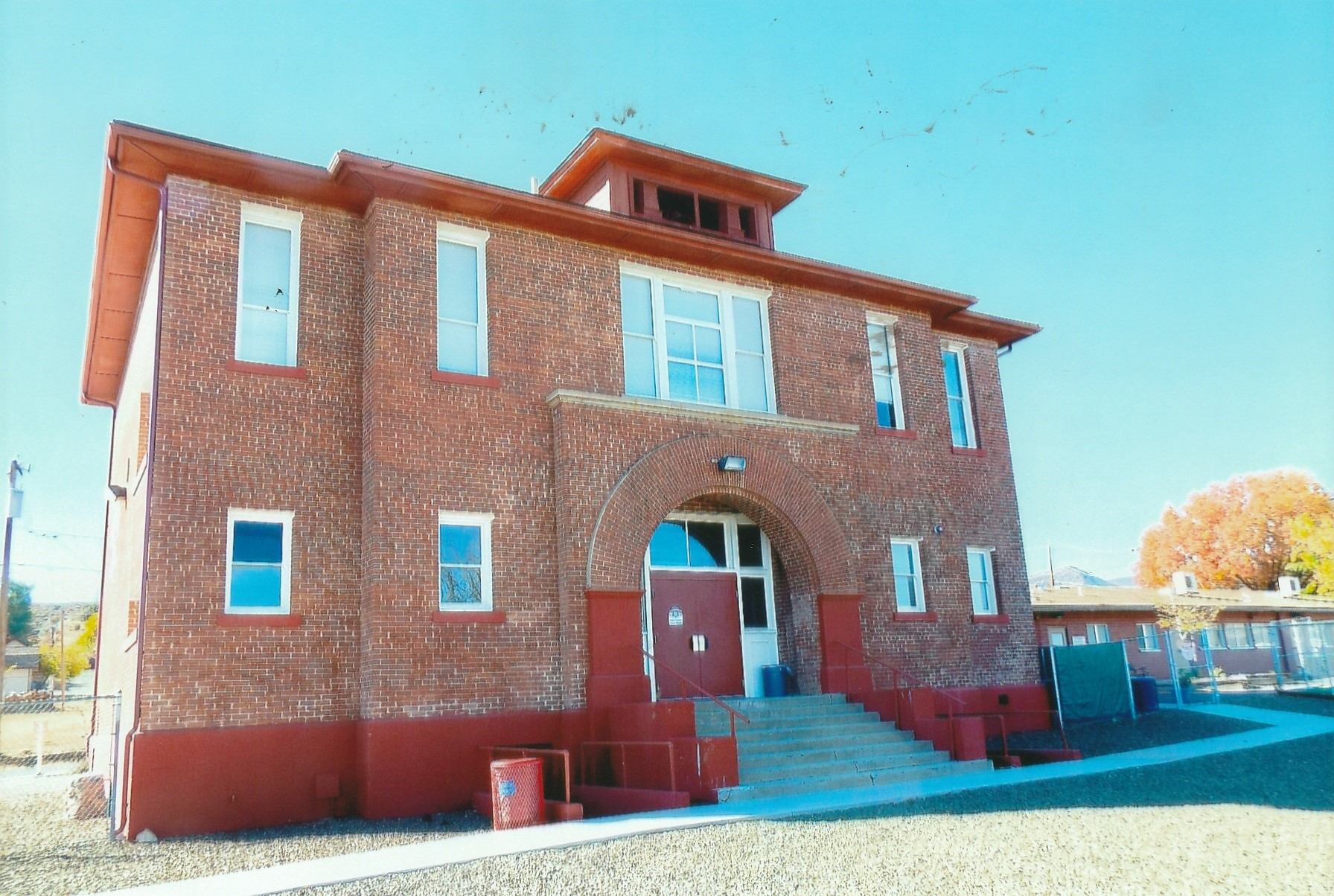
Building in 2018

In the 1990s, the school district decided the building was no longer suitable for use as a school. Partial remodeling done in 1987 did not overcome original design issues, and further modernizing was not considered financially viable. The school district initiated the process for listing the building by commissioning an assessment by architects Gerald A. Doyle & Associates. Their report concluded the building was no longer "ideal" for use as a school but had "significant architectural and historical significance". The report documented original features including floors, stairs, brickwork, window and door frames, ceilings, interior walls, chair rails, picture moldings, slate chalkboards, light fixtures, and the school bell. Restoration of these features was estimated to cost $411,000.

In December 2000, the school district received funding from the Arizona School Facilities Board to construct additional elementary classroom space allowing the relocation of the remaining elementary classes from the Red Brick Schoolhouse.

The district approved the renovation plan in February 2003 and began interior renovation later that year. The project architect was Swan Architects of Phoenix. Historic renovation was funded by a federal emergency repair and renovation grant from the United States Department of Education, state grants, and private donations. The building was converted for administrative use, with historic displays and the original school bell remaining. A 2003 $22,000 grant from the State Historic Preservation Office funded replacement of the roof and repair of the chimney and windows. This phase of the restoration, which was delayed due to the discovery of asbestos and the difficulty in finding historically accurate bricks to repair the chimney, was completed in 2005.

The renovation was delayed when the building was officially recognized as historic. Renovation plans were updated since some current building codes were no longer applicable to a historic structure. On June 30, 2005 a plaque was unveiled to commemorate the listing of the schoolhouse on the NRHP. The plaque is located in the first floor entryway due to fear of vandalism if it were on the outside of the structure. Restoration work was funded by state and federal grants totaling over $200,000 received by the district in the early 2000s.

In 2008, restoration of the exterior, funded in part by a Heritage Park Restoration grant, was completed.

== Current usage ==
In 2013 the ground floor was leased for $1000 per month for five years to the Yavapai County Sheriff's Office as the Mayer substation. All school district offices were relocated to the second floor. The Sheriff's substation opened in June 2014.
