= Mayer, Arizona =

CDP in Yavapai County, Arizona

- CDP
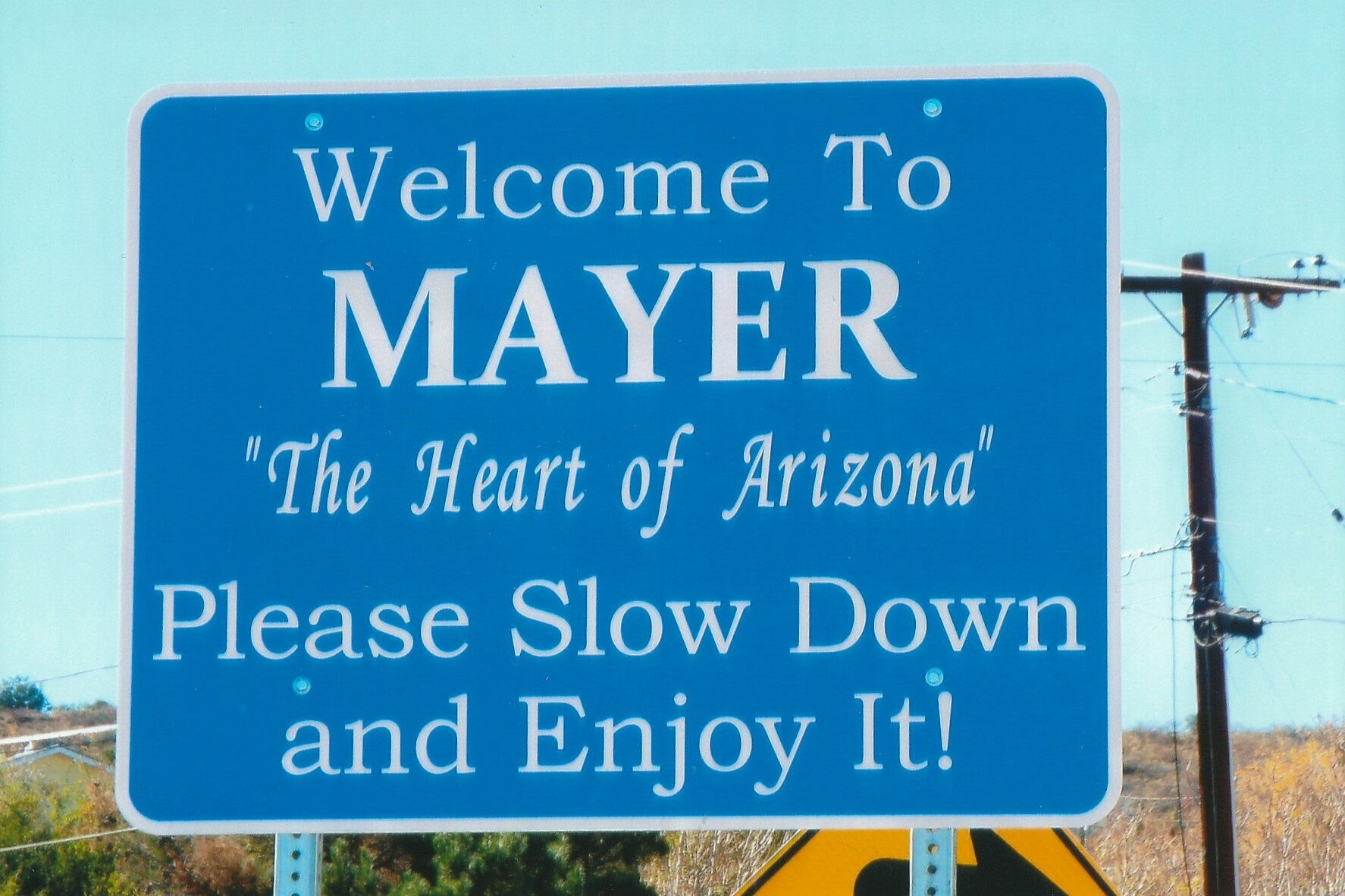
- "Welcome to Mayer, Arizona"

- Location in Yavapai County and the state of Arizona

- Location in the United States
- Coordinates: 34°24′40″N 112°14′39″W
- Country: United States
- State: Arizona
- County: Yavapai

Area
  - Total: 20.15 sq mi (52.19 km^{2})
  - Land: 20.15 sq mi (52.19 km^{2})
  - Water: 0 sq mi (0.00 km^{2})
- Elevation: 4,695 ft (1,431 m)

Population (2020)
  - Total: 1,558
  - Density: 77.3/sq mi (29.85/km^{2})
- Time zone: UTC-7 (MST)
- ZIP code: 86333
- Area code: 928
- FIPS code: 04-45180
- GNIS feature ID: 2408191

Mayer is a census-designated place (CDP) in Yavapai County, Arizona, United States. The population was 1,408 at the 2000 census. Mayer includes three sites listed on the National Register of Historic Places: the Mayer Apartments, the Mayer Business Block, and the Mayer Red Brick Schoolhouse.

== History ==
The place was originally called Wi:kidoʼyoʼ in Yavapai. A local legend holds that the English name came from a runaway boy with the last name of Mayer. From May to June 1942, 245 Japanese Americans were confined at the Mayer Assembly Center, one of 17 temporary detention camps built to hold Japanese Americans removed from the West Coast after the U.S. entered World War II. The 69 families were mostly from Maricopa County's Salt River Valley area, and lived in military-style barracks on the converted Civilian Conservation Corps camp for just under a month before being transferred to the more permanent and isolated internment camp at Poston, Arizona.

=== 2017 wildfire ===
The Goodwin Fire sparked on June 24, 2017, in the Bradshaw Mountains near the town of Mayer, which days later led to the evacuations of more than 9,000 residents. The wildfire burned 28,516 acres of land. Highway 69 was closed between the towns of Mayer and Dewey-Humboldt. The fire destroyed approximately five structures and injured one firefighter.

== Geography ==
According to the United States Census Bureau, the CDP has a total area of 20.1 square miles (52 km^{2}), all land.

=== Climate ===
According to the Köppen Climate Classification system, Mayer has a semi-arid climate, abbreviated "BSk" on climate maps.

== Demographics ==
Historical population
Census	Pop.	Note	%±
2000	1,408		—
2010	1,497		6.3%
2020	1,558		4.1%
U.S. Decennial Census

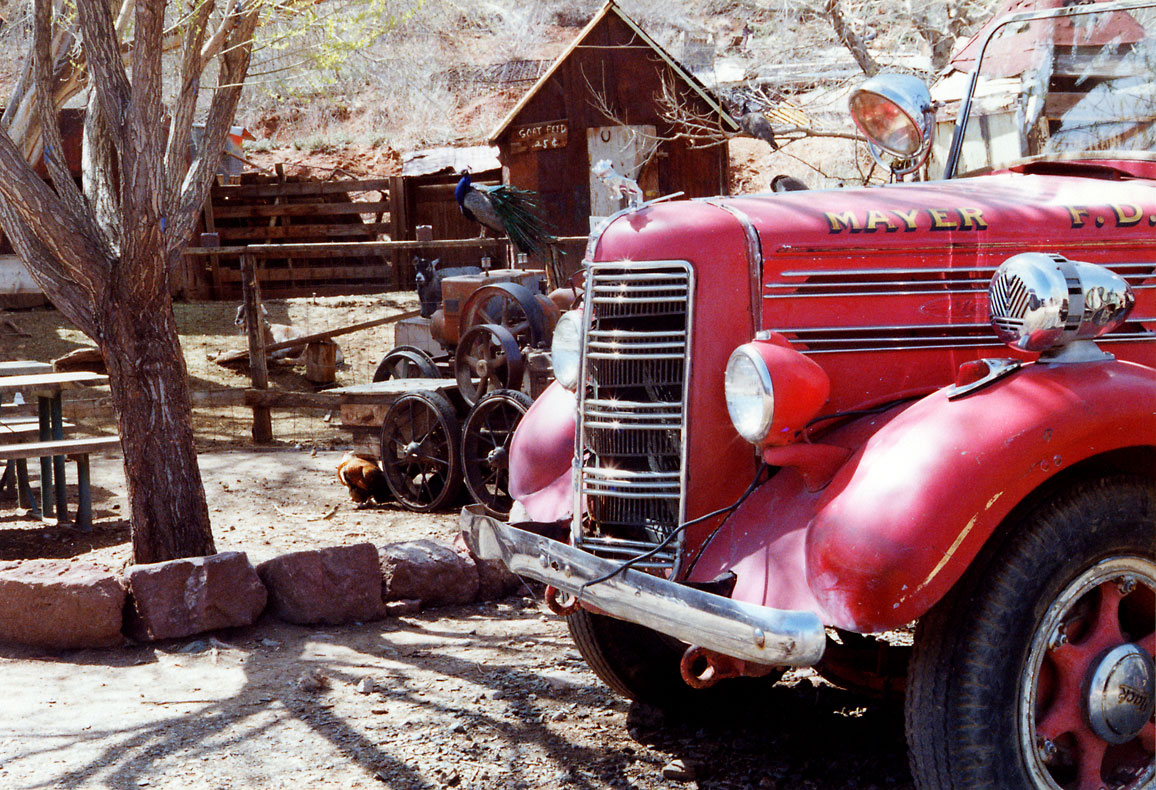
Old Mayer fire engine

=== 2020 census ===
As of the 2020 census, Mayer had a population of 1,558. The median age was 56.1 years. 15.6% of residents were under the age of 18 and 29.2% of residents were 65 years of age or older. For every 100 females there were 112.6 males, and for every 100 females age 18 and over there were 113.1 males age 18 and over.

0.0% of residents lived in urban areas, while 100.0% lived in rural areas.

There were 728 households in Mayer, of which 15.4% had children under the age of 18 living in them. Of all households, 41.9% were married-couple households, 28.0% were households with a male householder and no spouse or partner present, and 22.5% were households with a female householder and no spouse or partner present. About 38.5% of all households were made up of individuals and 20.2% had someone living alone who was 65 years of age or older.

There were 827 housing units, of which 12.0% were vacant. The homeowner vacancy rate was 1.6% and the rental vacancy rate was 4.4%.

Racial composition as of the 2020 census
Race	Number	Percent
White	1,323	84.9%
Black or African American	0	0.0%
American Indian and Alaska Native	15	1.0%
Asian	2	0.1%
Native Hawaiian and Other Pacific Islander	2	0.1%
Some other race	48	3.1%
Two or more races	168	10.8%
Hispanic or Latino (of any race)	147	9.4%

=== 2000 census ===
At the 2000 census there were 1,408 people, 585 households, and 379 families living in the CDP. The population density was 70.2 inhabitants per square mile (27.1/km^{2}). There were 714 housing units at an average density of 35.6 per square mile (13.7/km^{2}). The racial makeup of the CDP was 94% White, 1% Native American, 3% from other races, and 2% from two or more races. 9% of the population were Hispanic or Latino of any race. Of the 585 households 26% had children under the age of 18 living with them, 52% were married couples living together, 8% had a female householder with no husband present, and 35% were non-families. 28% of households were one person and 13% were one person aged 65 or older. The average household size was 2.4 and the average family size was 2.9.

The age distribution was 24% under the age of 18, 6% from 18 to 24, 23% from 25 to 44, 28% from 45 to 64, and 19% 65 or older. The median age was 44 years. For every 100 females, there were 99.2 males. For every 100 females age 18 and over, there were 97.6 males.

The median household income was $28,412 and the median family income was $33,988. Males had a median income of $38,304 versus $21,417 for females. The per capita income for the CDP was $14,297. About 14% of families and 19% of the population were below the poverty line, including 13% of those under age 18 and 17% of those age 65 or over.

== Education ==
Most of Mayer CDP is in the Mayer Unified School District, while a small portion is in the Humboldt Unified School District. The former district operates Mayer High School in Spring Valley.

Yavapai County Free Library District operates the Mayer Library.

There was a private school, The Orme School, which closed in 2025. The school had a Mayer, Arizona postal address, but is not in the Mayer census-designated place. The Arizona Republic described the school as being in Mayer.

== National Register of Historic Places ==
The following pictured properties in Mayer are listed in the National Register of Historic Places:

Historic structures listed in the NRHP

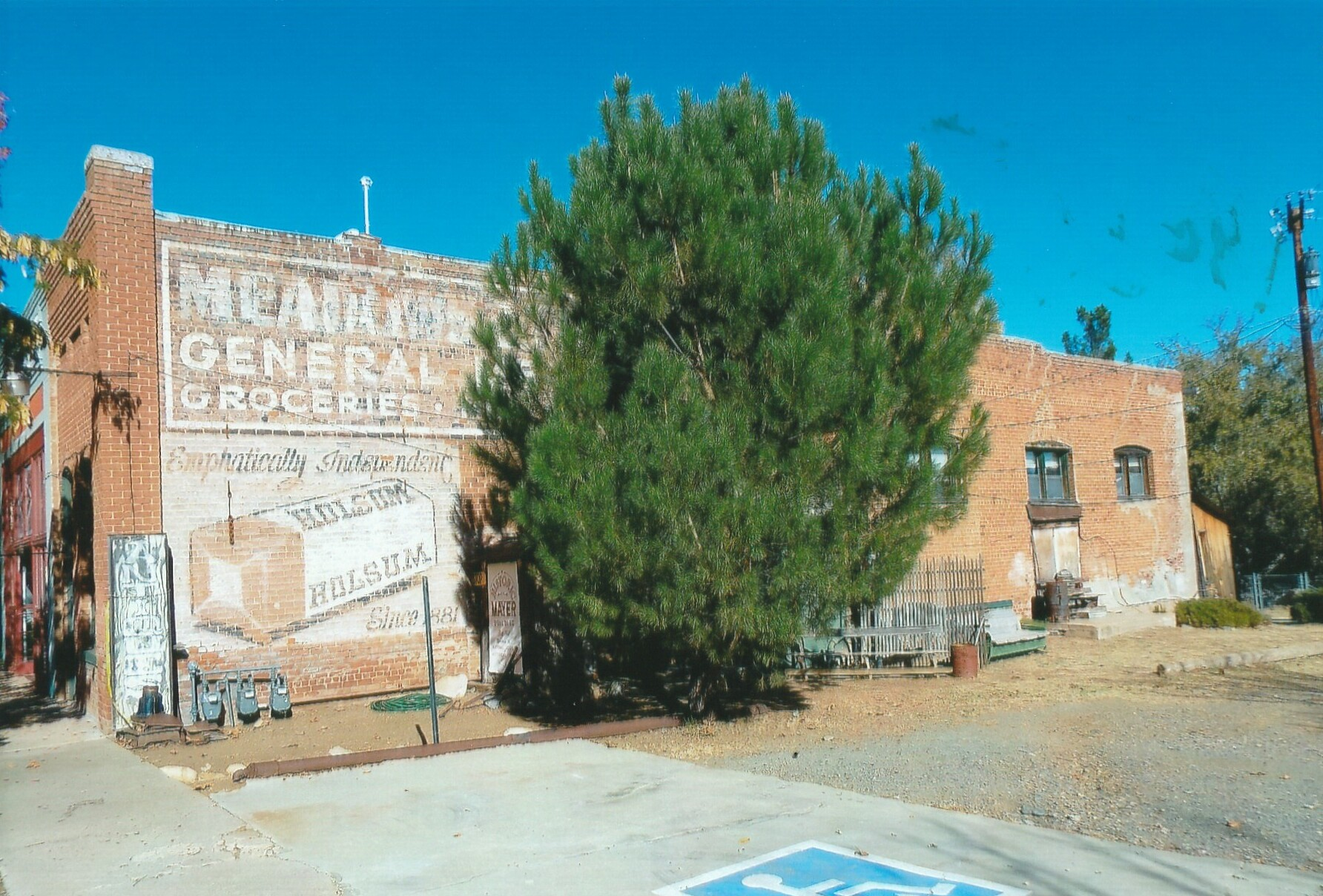
Mayer General Market Store

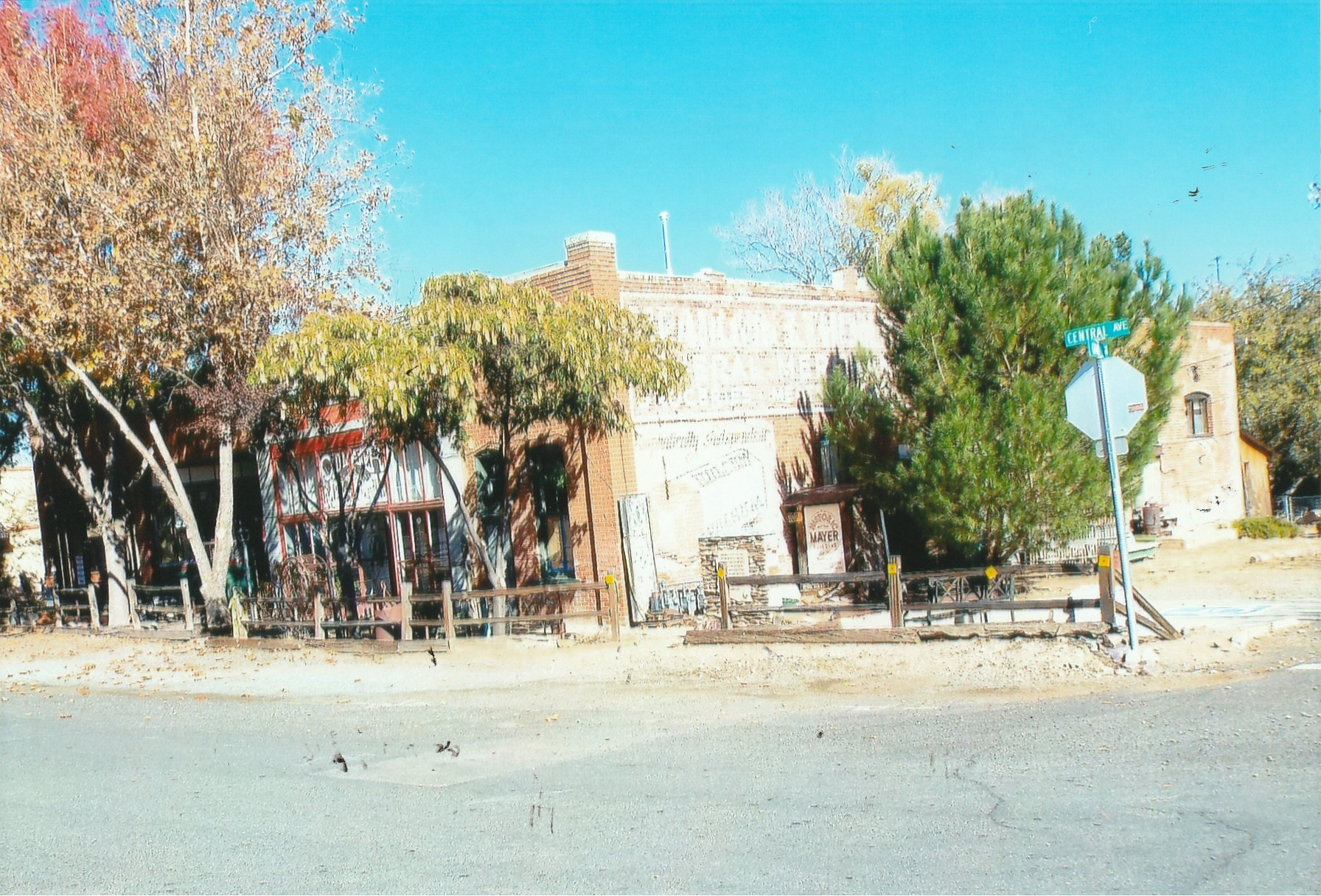
Historic Mayer Business Block.

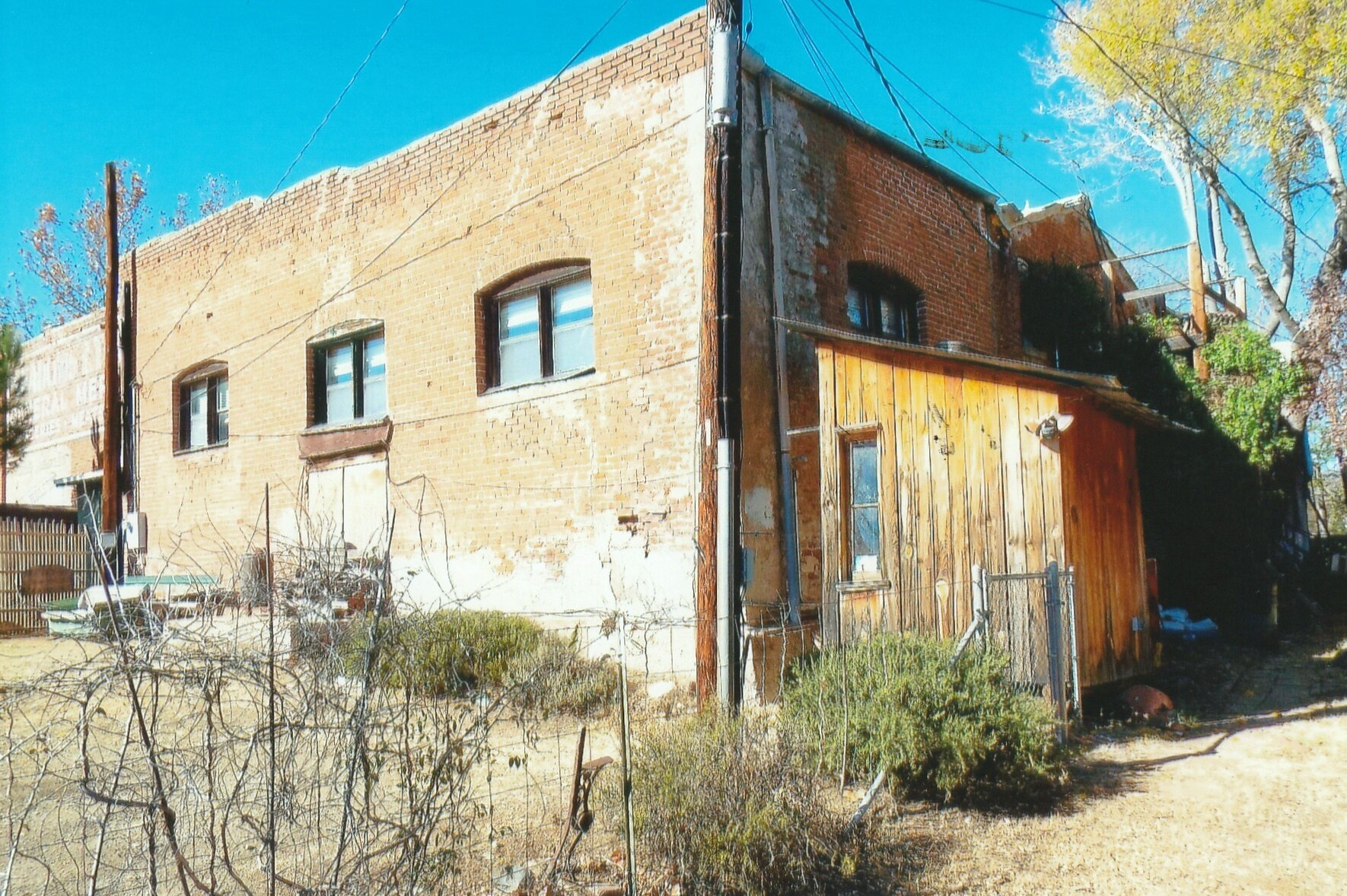
Rear view of the Mayer General Market Store.

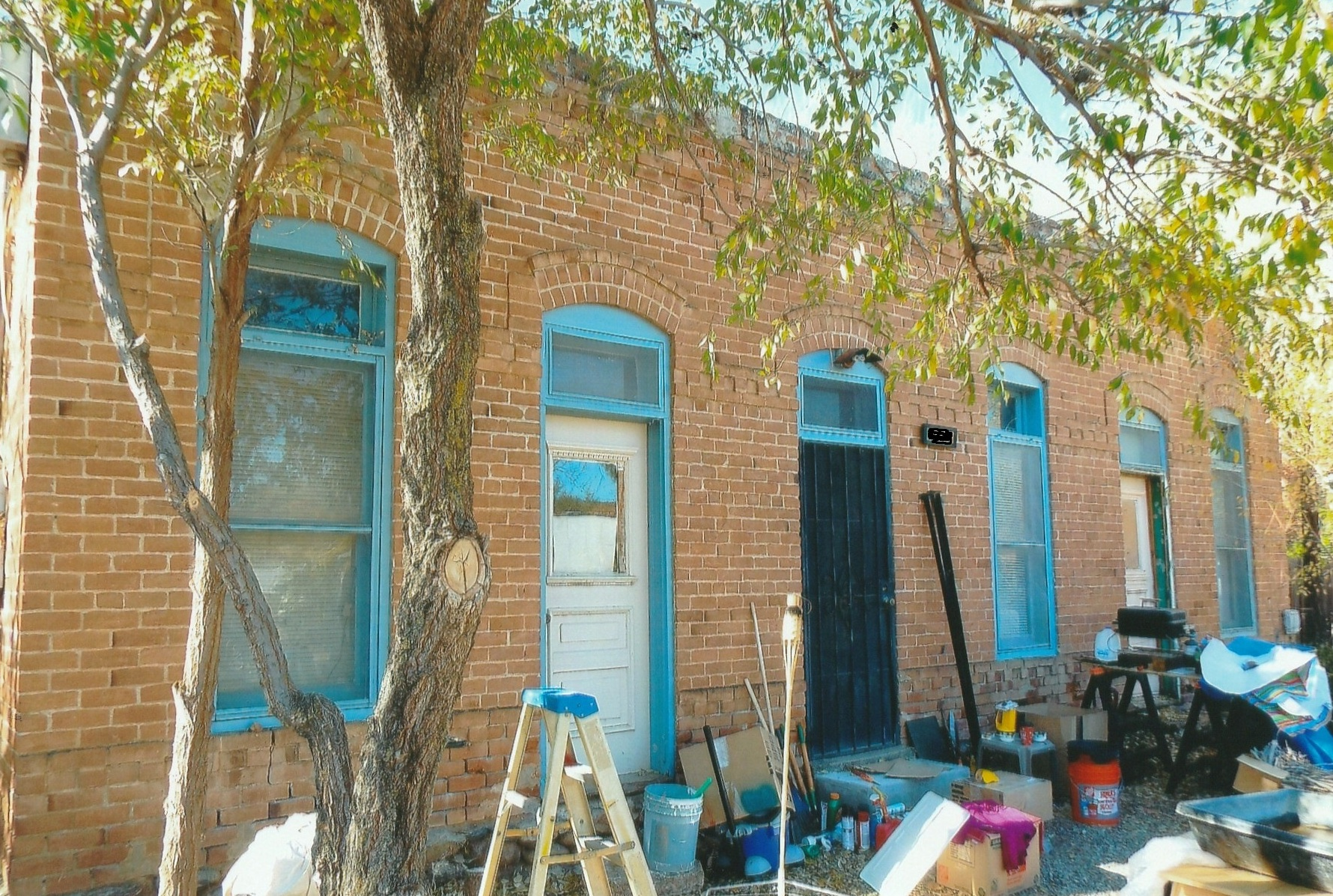
Mayer Apartment #1.

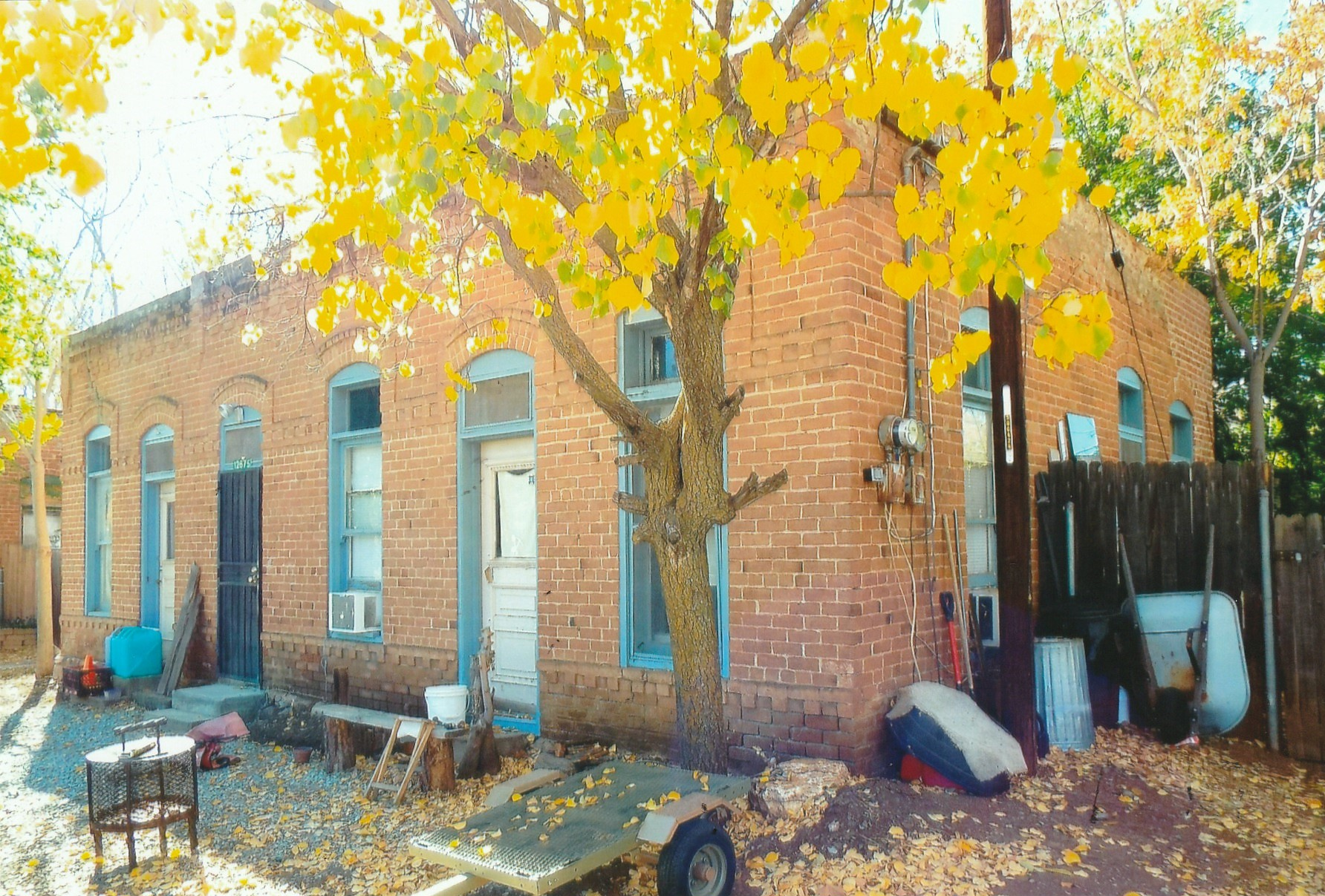
Mayer Apartment #2.

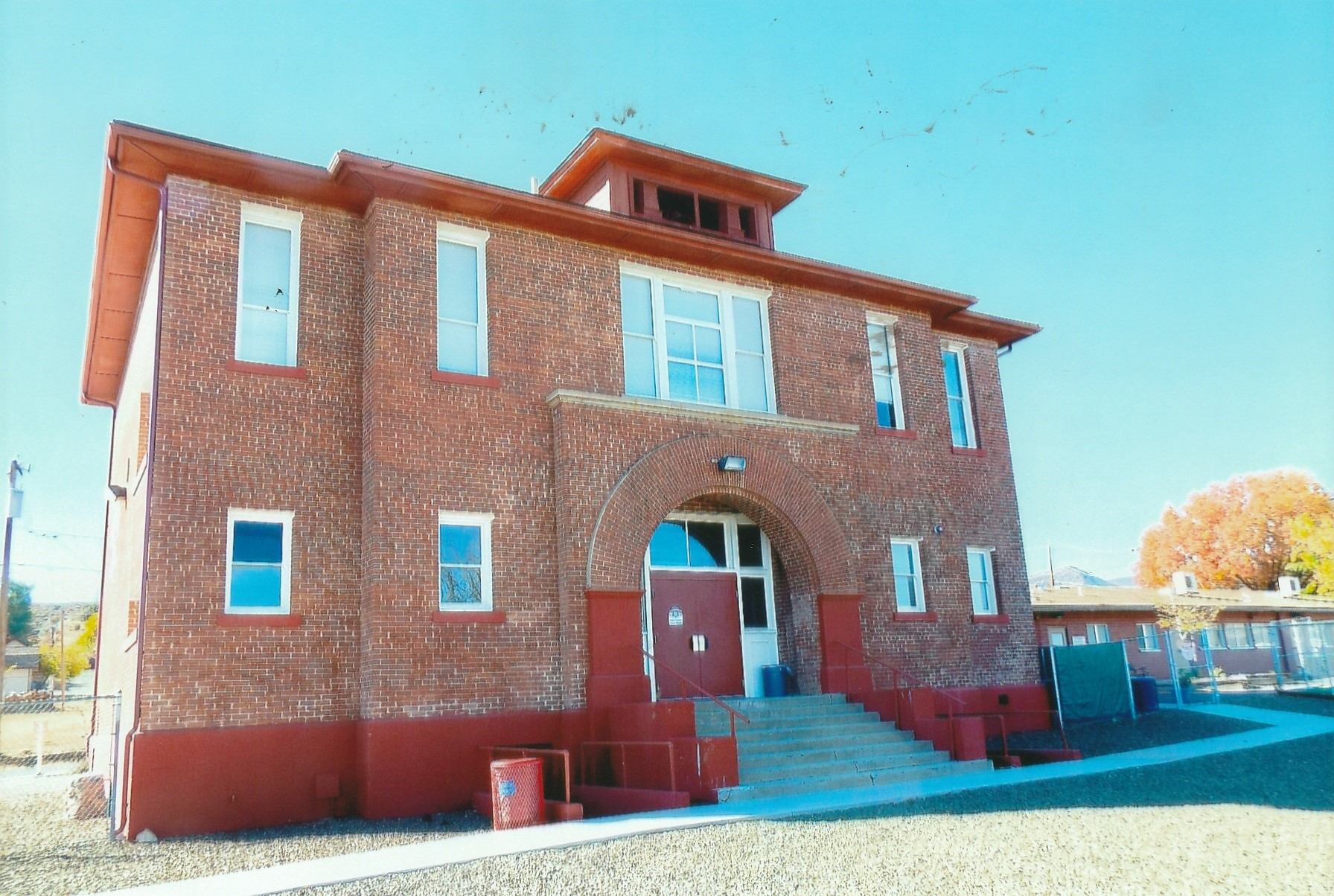
Mayer Red Brick Schoolhouse.

== See also ==
- Joe Mayer
- List of historic properties in Mayer, Arizona
