= Mayer High School =

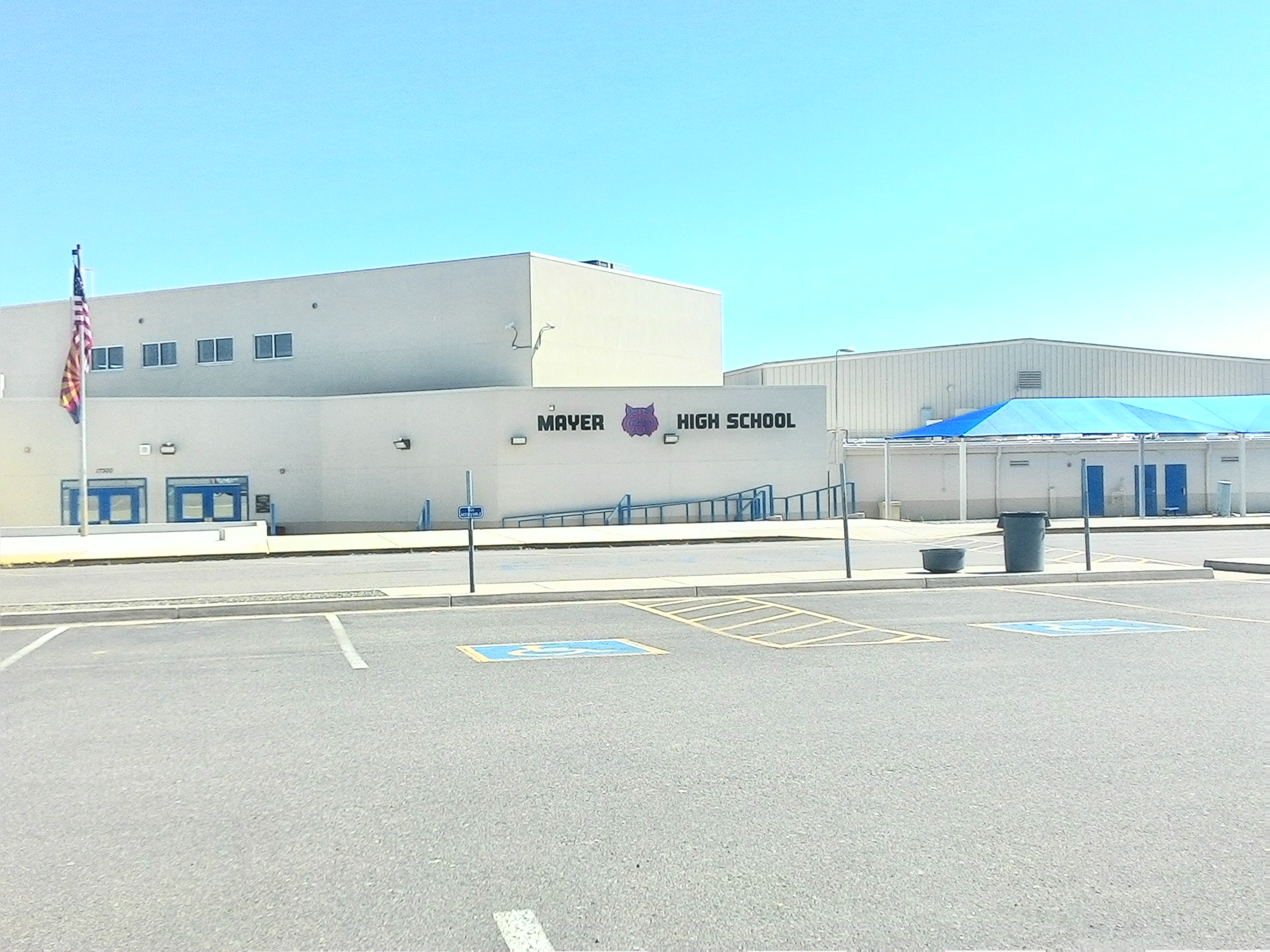

Location
- 17300 E. Mule Deer Drive; Mayer, Arizona address 86333; United States; 34°20′56″N 112°9′34″W

Information
- School type: Public high school
- School district: Mayer Unified School District
- CEEB code: 030205
- Teaching staff: 16.00 (FTE)
- Grades: 7-12
- Enrollment: 177 (2023–2024)
- Student to teacher ratio: 11.06
- Colors: Blue and white
- Mascot: Wildcat
- Website: mayerhs.mayerschools.org

Mayer High School is a high school (serving grades 7 through 12) in Spring Valley, Arizona, with a Mayer postal address. Along with an elementary school, it is a part of the Mayer Unified School District. Schools in this district operate on a four-day school week.

Mayer USD includes almost all of Mayer, Cordes Lakes, Spring Valley, and a small portion of Black Canyon City. It also includes Poland Junction.

== History ==
In 1984 superintendent Jim Rhoades wanted to ban music players and wished to discuss the matter with the board of education. He stated that he is in favor because of music interfering with classes, and he stated this was not due to fears of Satanic panic. There had been statements in the community that the Sherriff's Office of Yavapai County started an investigation of people at Mayer High worshiping the devil, but Rhoades stated that the statements were not true.

In 2008 U.S. News & World Report ranked the school among the 24 highest performing high schools in the state.

In 2011 Jeff Duncan became the principal.
