= List of historic properties in Mayer, Arizona =

- Town
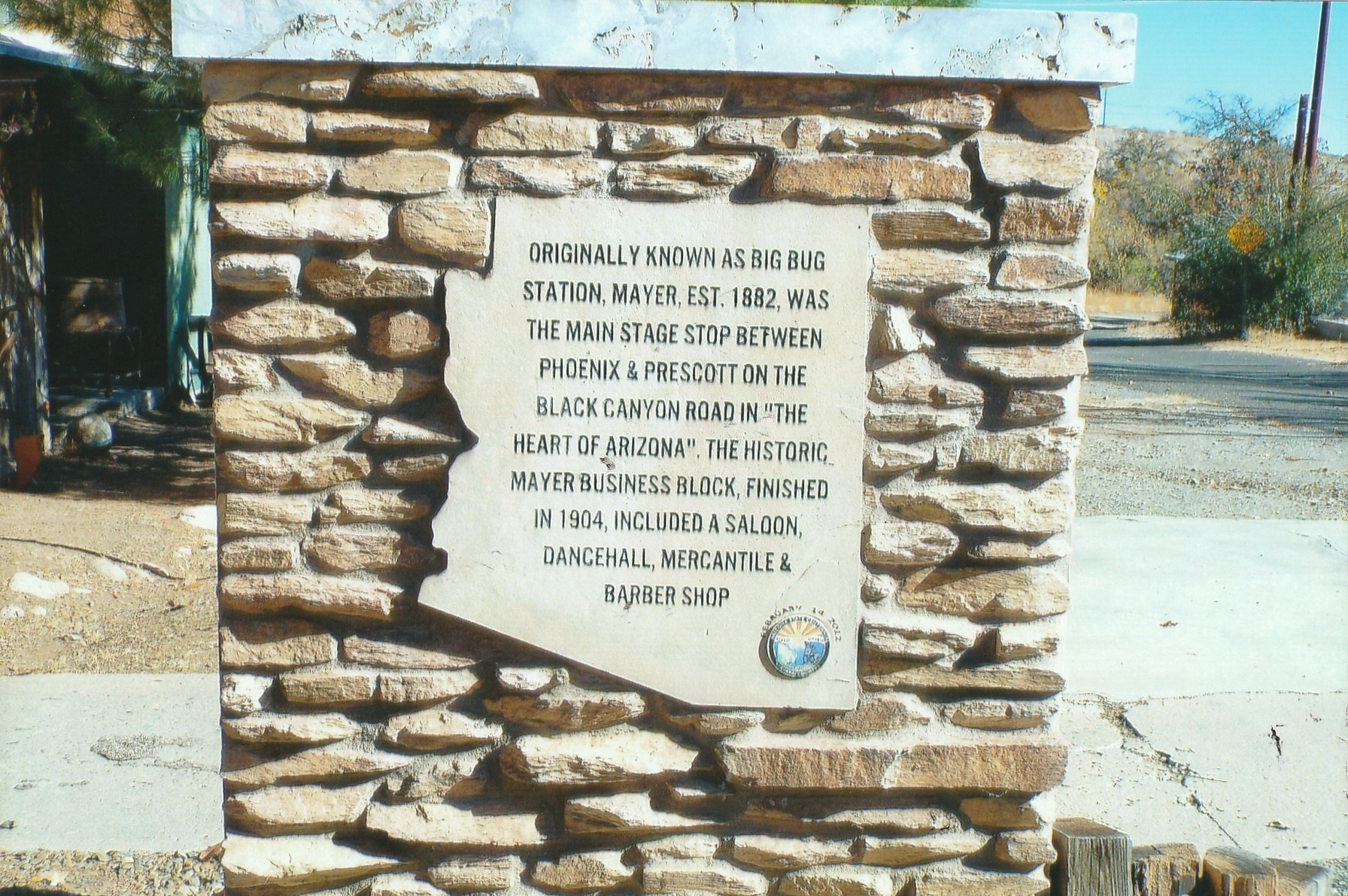
- Mayer Business Block Marker

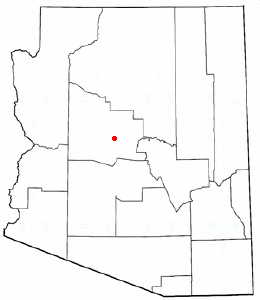
- Location in Yavapai County and the state of Arizona

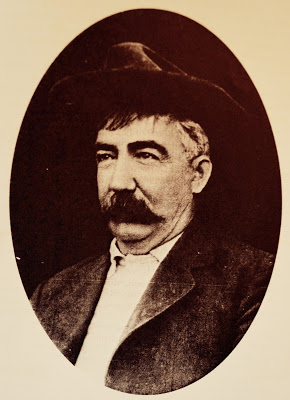
Joe Mayer c. 1900

This is a list, which includes a photographic gallery, of some of the remaining structures and monuments, of historic significance in Mayer, a town in Yavapai County, Arizona.

== Brief history ==
The area surrounding the Bradshaw Mountains was inhabited by the Hohokams, a Native American tribe, and later by their descendants the Yavapai before the arrival and settlement of the people of Anglo European descent from the east coast of the United States.

Joe Mayer (birth name: Joseph Hoffmayer) was a native of Olean, New York, who like so many other American easterners moved to the west coast in search of gold. He changed his surname to "Mayer" and went to Silver City, New Mexico where he met Sarah Belle Wilbur, his future wife.

He then moved to Globe, Arizona and there he married Sarah and spent a year mining. By 1882, Mayer was mining in the Tip Top Mine in Central Arizona. In one occasion he had to go to the City of Prescott and decided to take a short cut from the Black Canyon Trail. During his trip, he made a stop at the “Big Bug Stage Station,” a stage stop on the Black Canyon Stage Line. The station was located on the outskirts of Big Bug Creek. Mayer was impressed with the area and he purchased the “Big Bug Stage Station” for $1,200 in gold. Mayer then moved there with his wife Sarah and children.

Miners would often stop at the Mayer's place to rest and to patronize the store which he had built. In 1882, Joe Mayer officially founded the town which bears his name. In 1884, his wife Sarah became the first postmistress of Mayer. Tragedy struck the town of Mayer in 1890, when heavy rain caused a dam nearby to fail causing a flood which wiped out all of the structures in the town.

Mayer began to rebuild the town and in 1897, he built a two-story hotel which he named the "Mayer Hotel". He offered the "right of way' to the Southern Pacific Railroad if they established a rail line in Mayer. The railroad began servicing the town of Mayer in 1898. Mayer established a brickyard and in 1902, he used his bricks to build a business block, now known as the "Mayer Business Block" across the street from the Mayer Hotel. The block included a saloon with a dance floor, a barber and bath shop, a Mercantile shop and a general store.

On November 28, 1909, Joe Mayor heard a noise outside his house and believing that there was an animal or thief, he took his rifle and ran outside. He tripped as he ran and accidentally shot himself. The wounds which he received were fatal and he died soon after.

== Historic properties ==
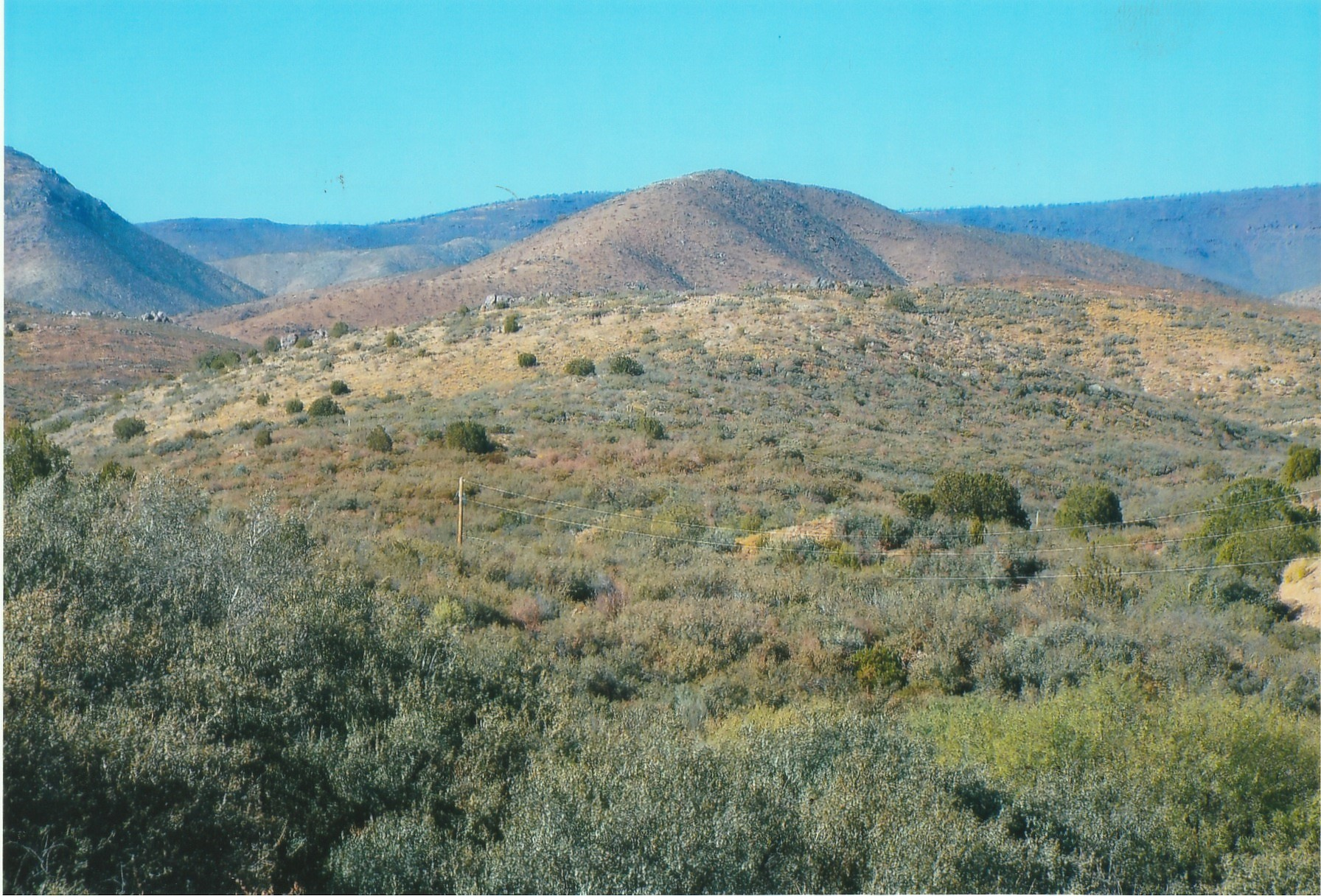
The Bradshaw Mountains

Various properties are listed in the National Register of Historic Places. The following is a brief description of the historic properties that are pictured:

- The Mayer Hotel – Built in 1897 and located on Central Ave.
- The Central Hotel – Built in 1899 and located on Central Ave.
- The historic Prescott and Eastern Railroad Depot – The depot was built in 1898 in Mayer, Arizona. The building was purchased by a private citizen who had It hauled to a hill in Phoenix. The owner turned it into part of his home. It is located at 1711 N. 18th Place.
- Early Pioneer House – Built in 1900.
- The Mayer Business Block – built in 1902:

The Mayer Tavern and Dance Floor
The Barber Shop and Bath House
The Mayer Mercantile Store
The General Market Store

- The Post Office – The building was built in 1902 and located on Central Ave.
- The Mayer Apartments – Two one story brick apartments built in 1902 by Mayer and listed in the National Register of Historic Places:

Mayer Apartment #1 – Once used as a local brothel.
Mayer Apartment #2

- The Mayer Red Brick Schoolhouse – The historic schoolhouse was built in 1914 and is located in Main St. The building is now used for the Mayer United School District administrative offices and as a Sheriff's substation.
- The Mayer Smokestack – The smokestack was built in 1916. It is 120 feet high.
- The Mayer Smelter – The ruins of the Mayer smelter.
- The Mayer Bank Building – Built in 1917 and located on Central Ave.
- Mine-carts – Mine-carts used in the mines in the Bradshaw Mountains in the 1890s.
- Ford Howard Cooper Fire Truck – A 1940 Fire Truck which serviced Mayer.

== Historic structures pictured ==
The following are the images of the historic structures in Mayer and its surrounding areas.

Historic structures in Mayer

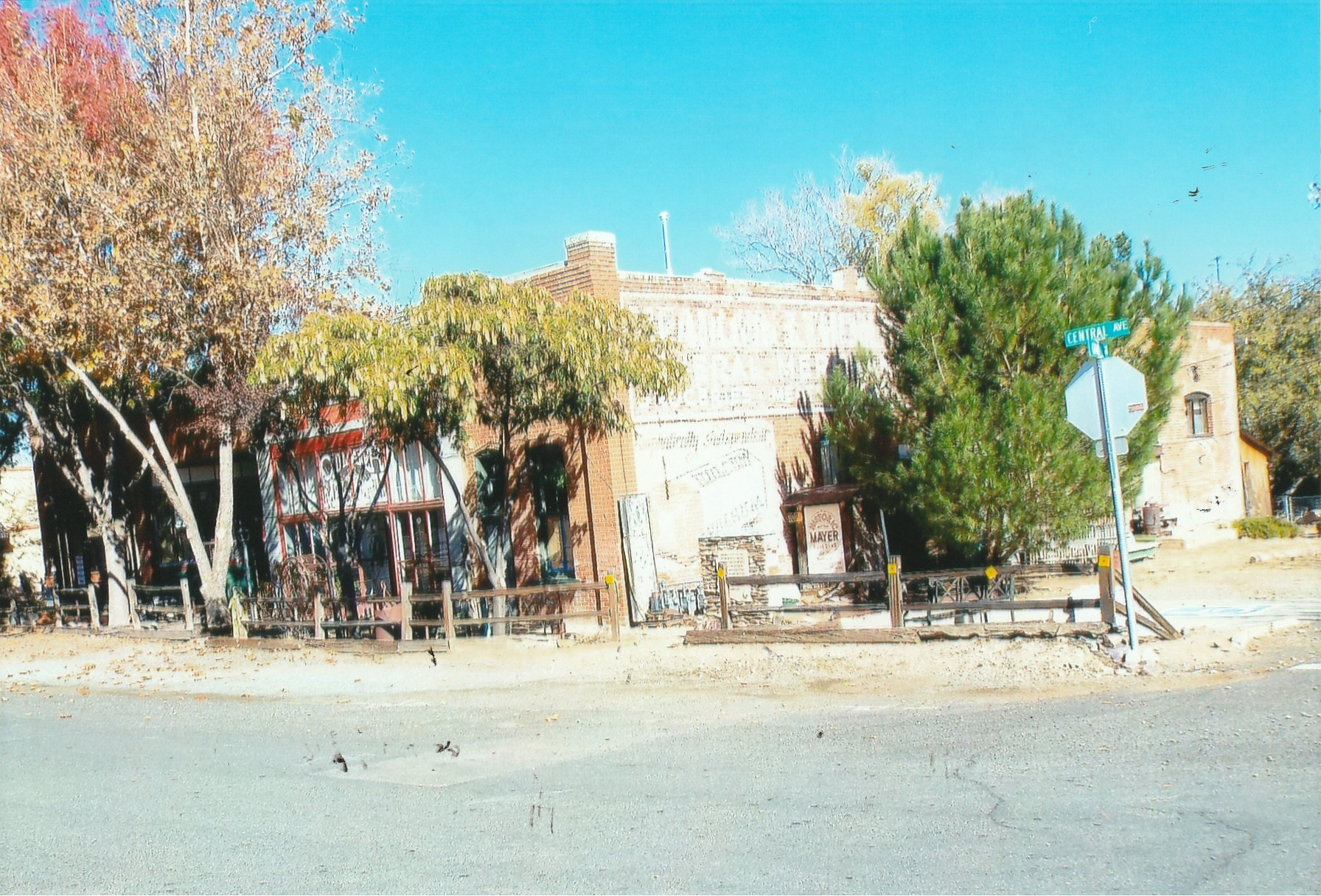
Historic Mayer Business Block

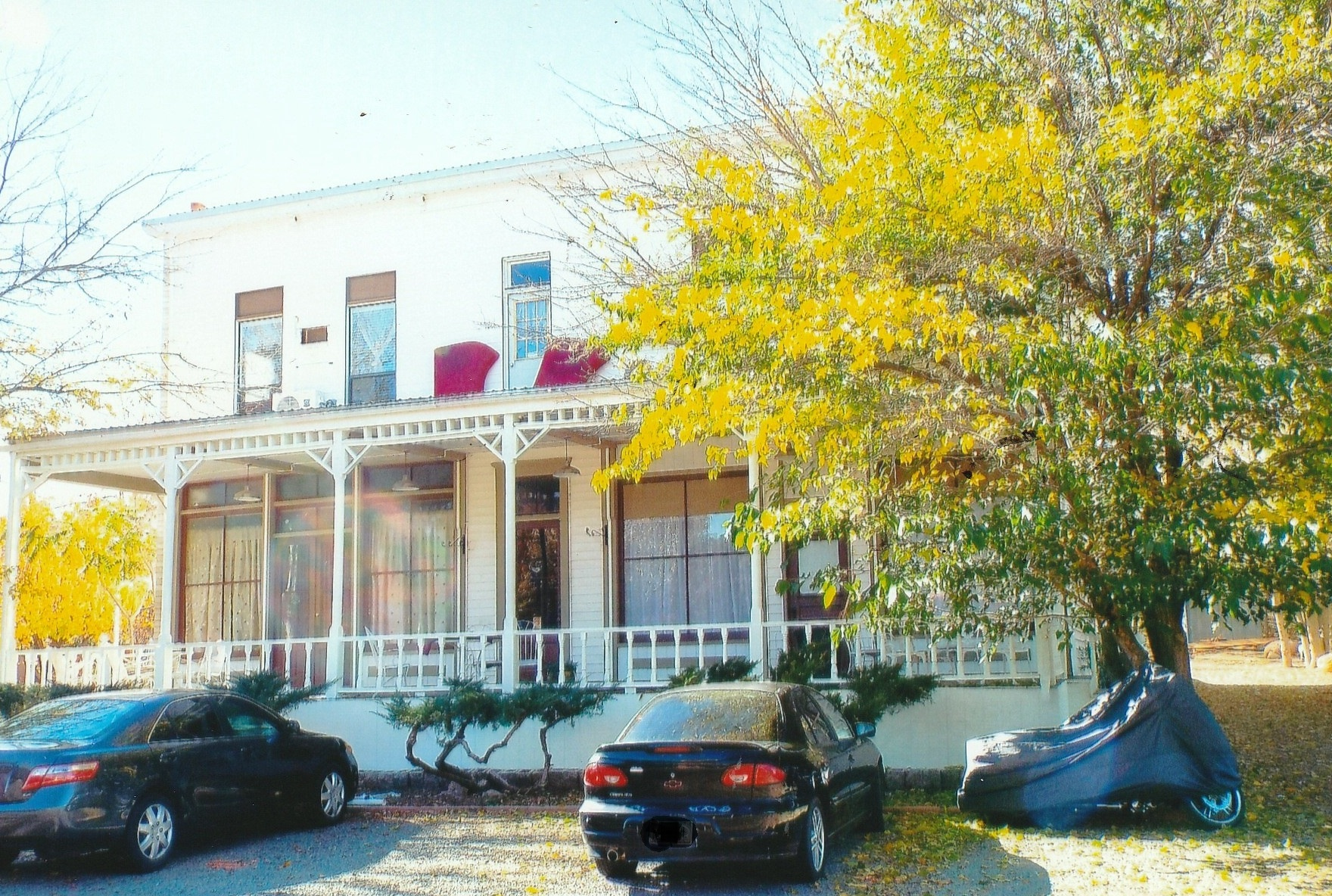
The Mayer Hotel.

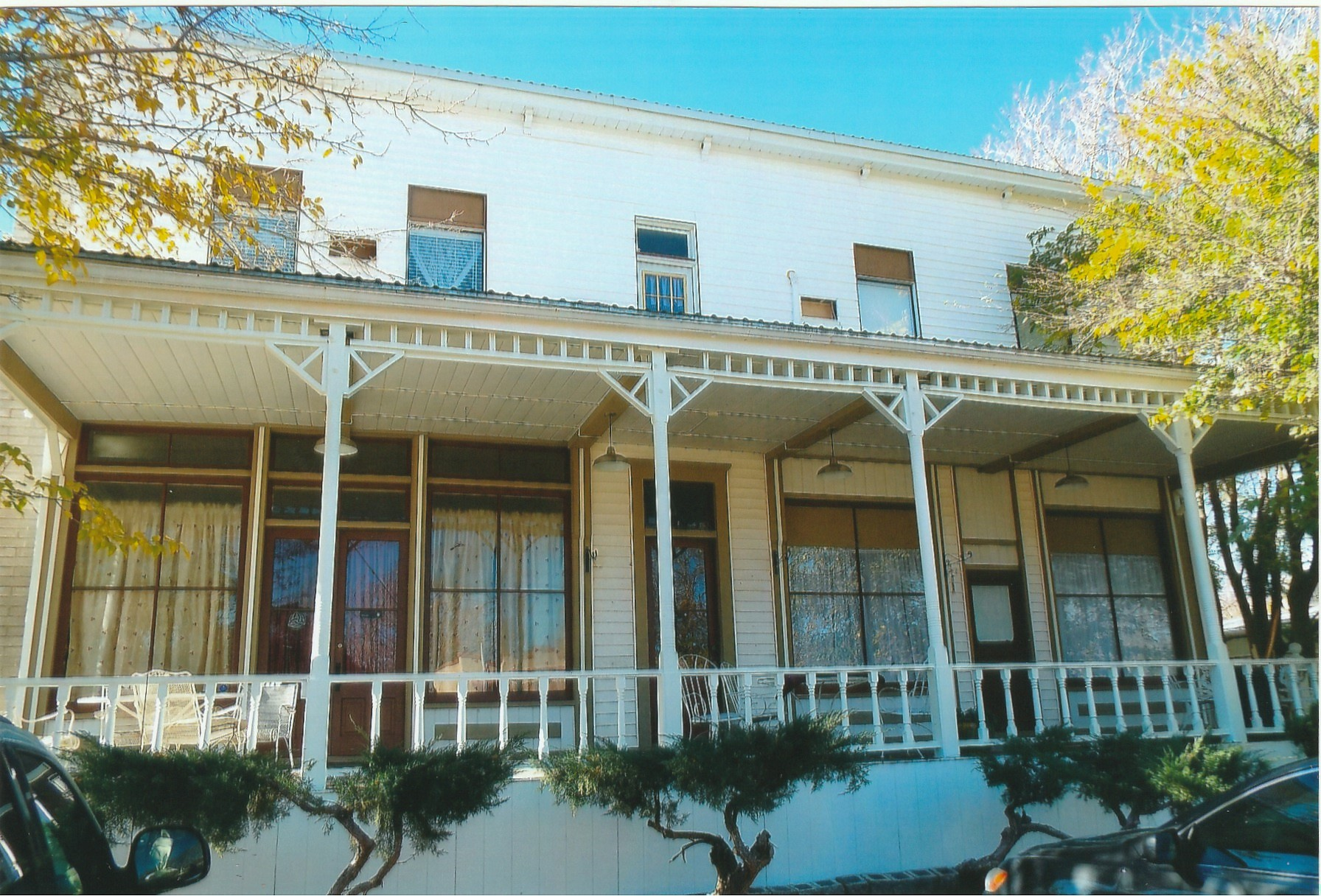
Close-up of the Mayer Hotel.

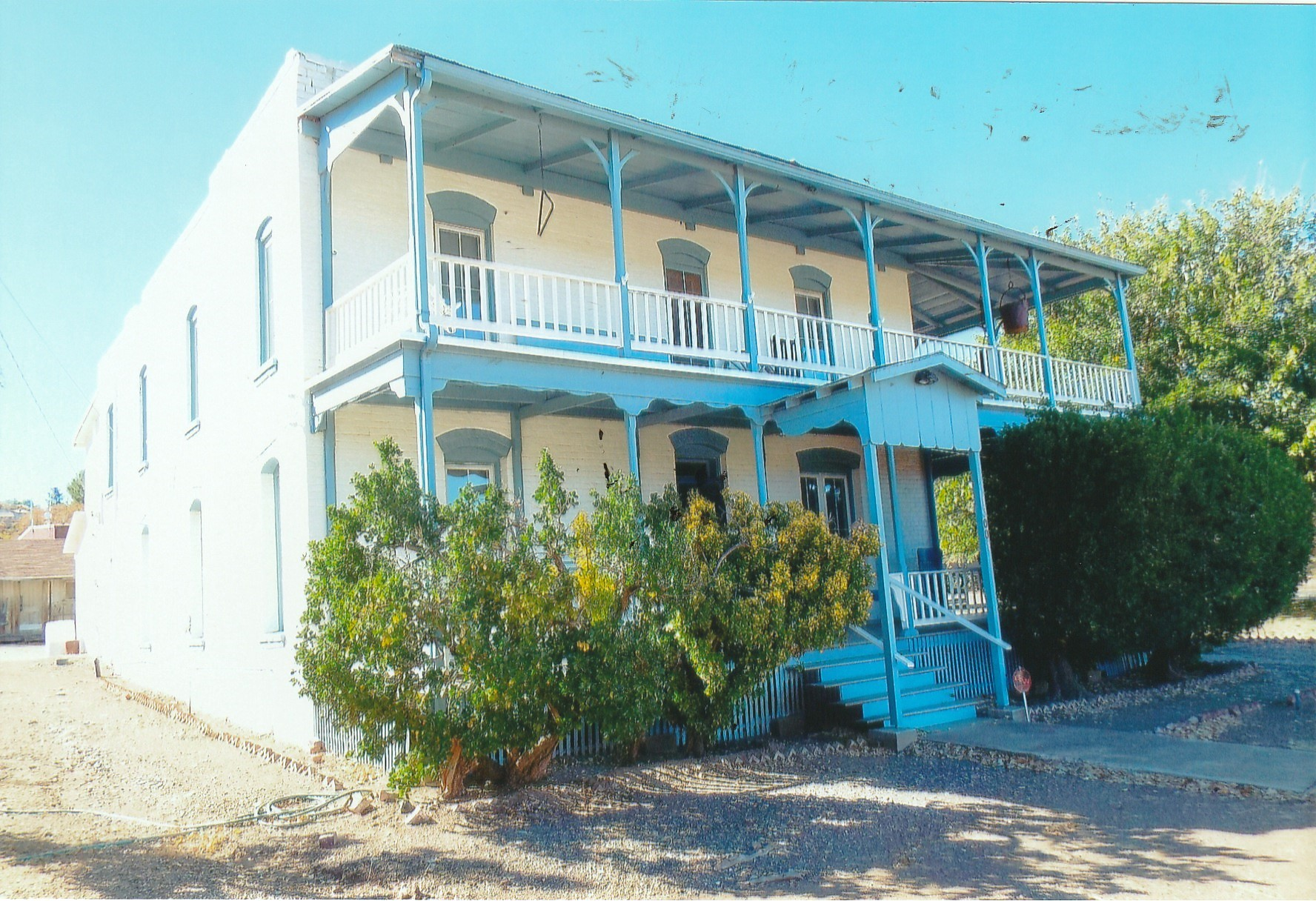
The Central Hotel.

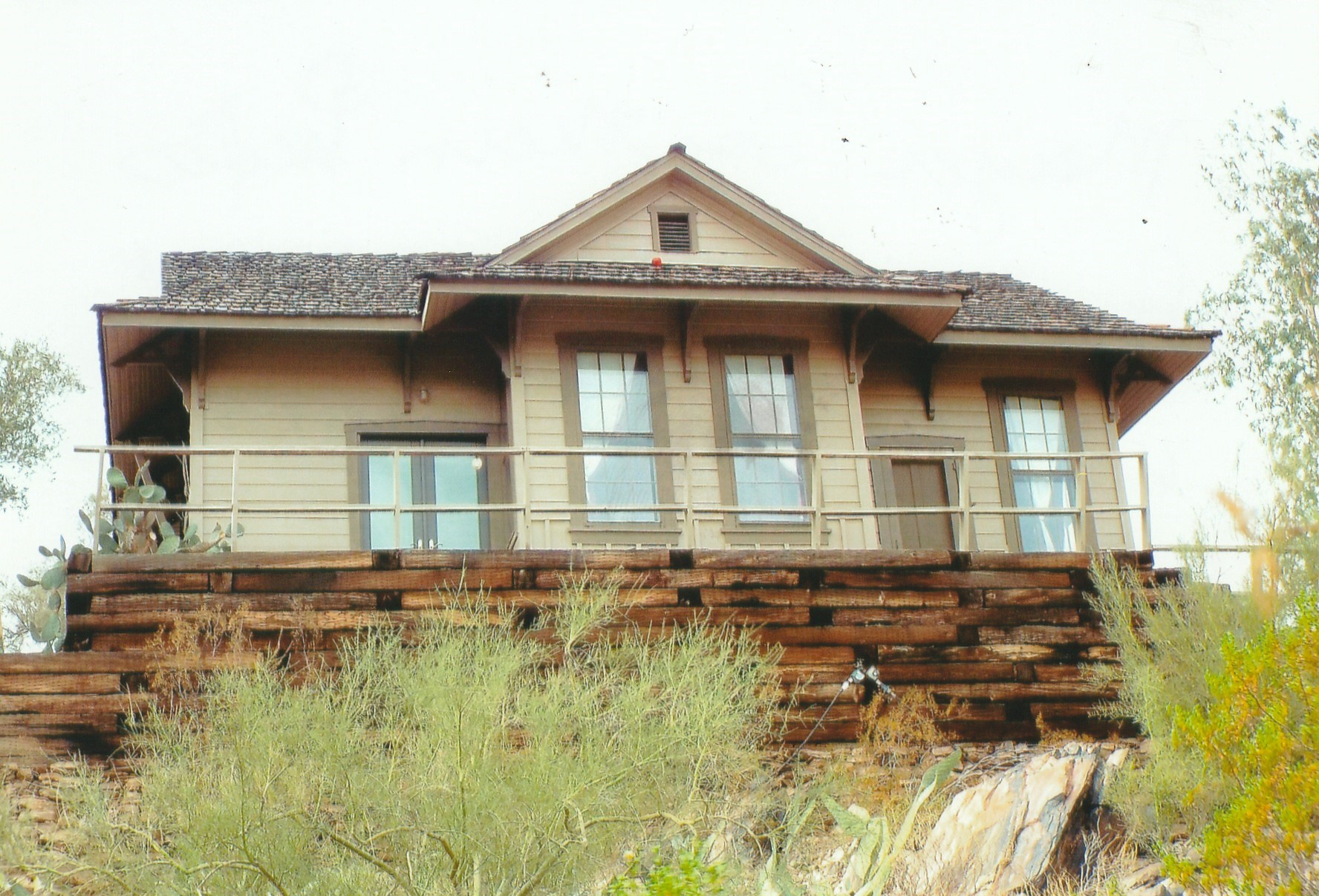
Prescott and Eastern Railroad Depot.

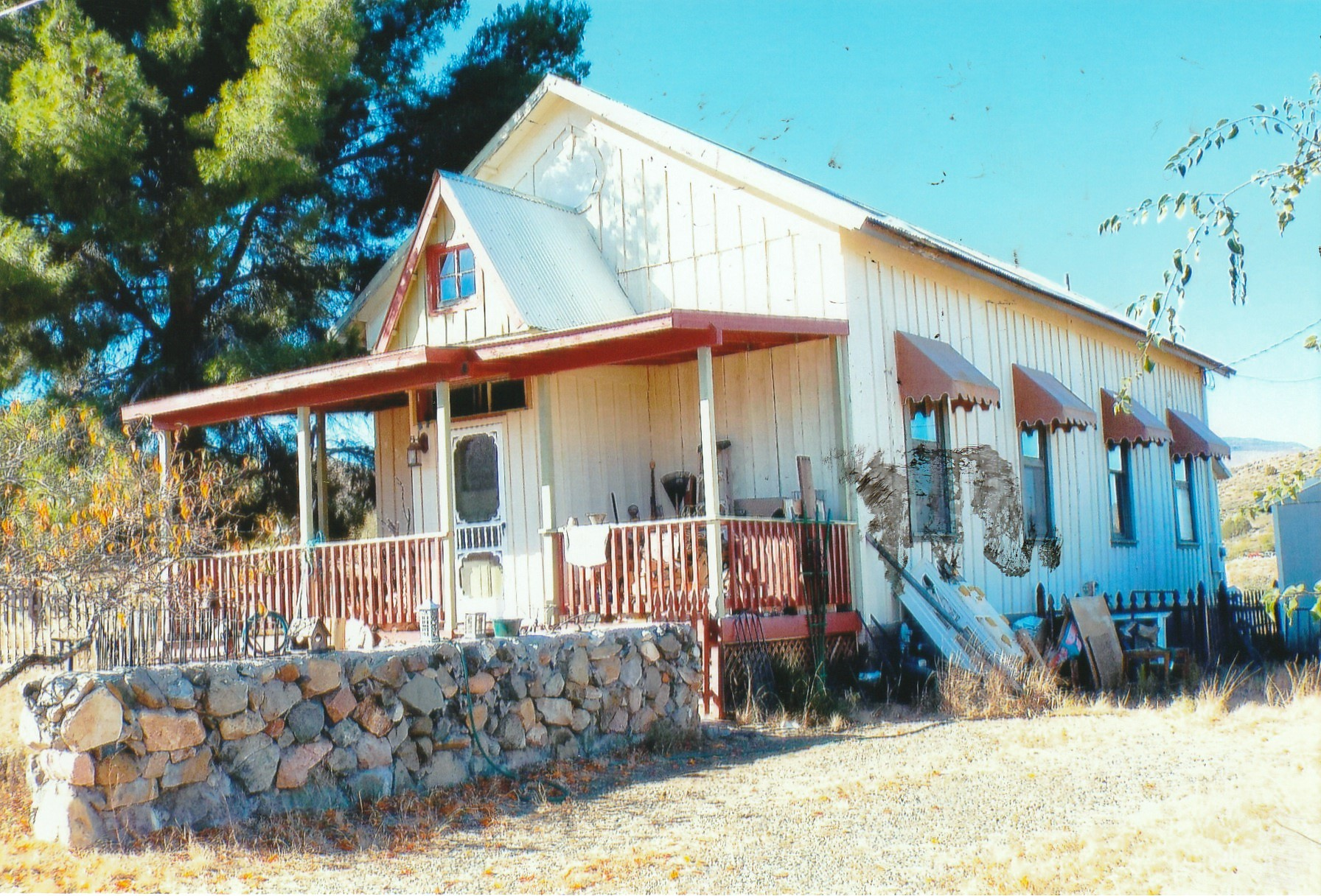
Pioneer House.

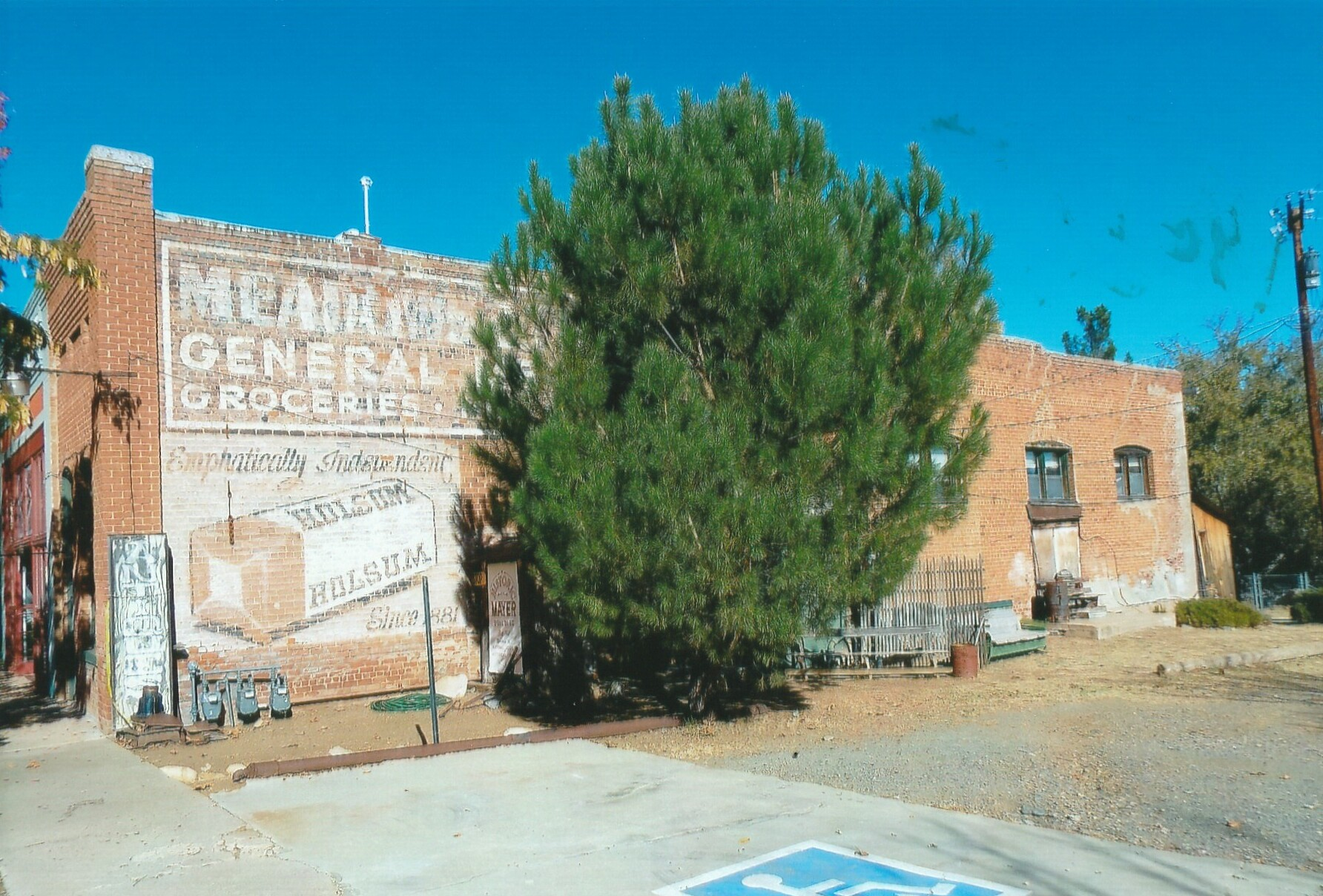
General Market Store.

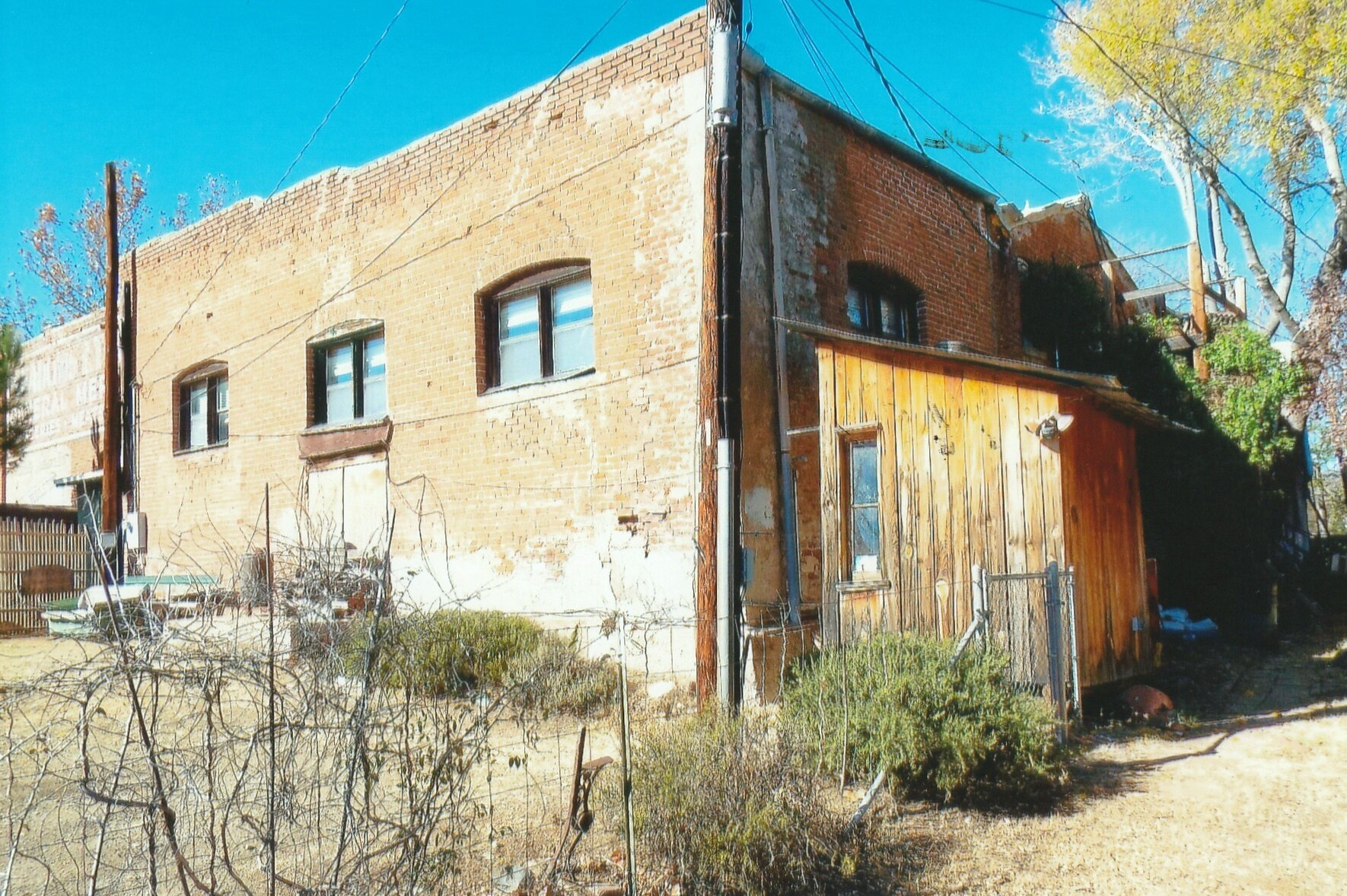
Different view of the General Market Store.

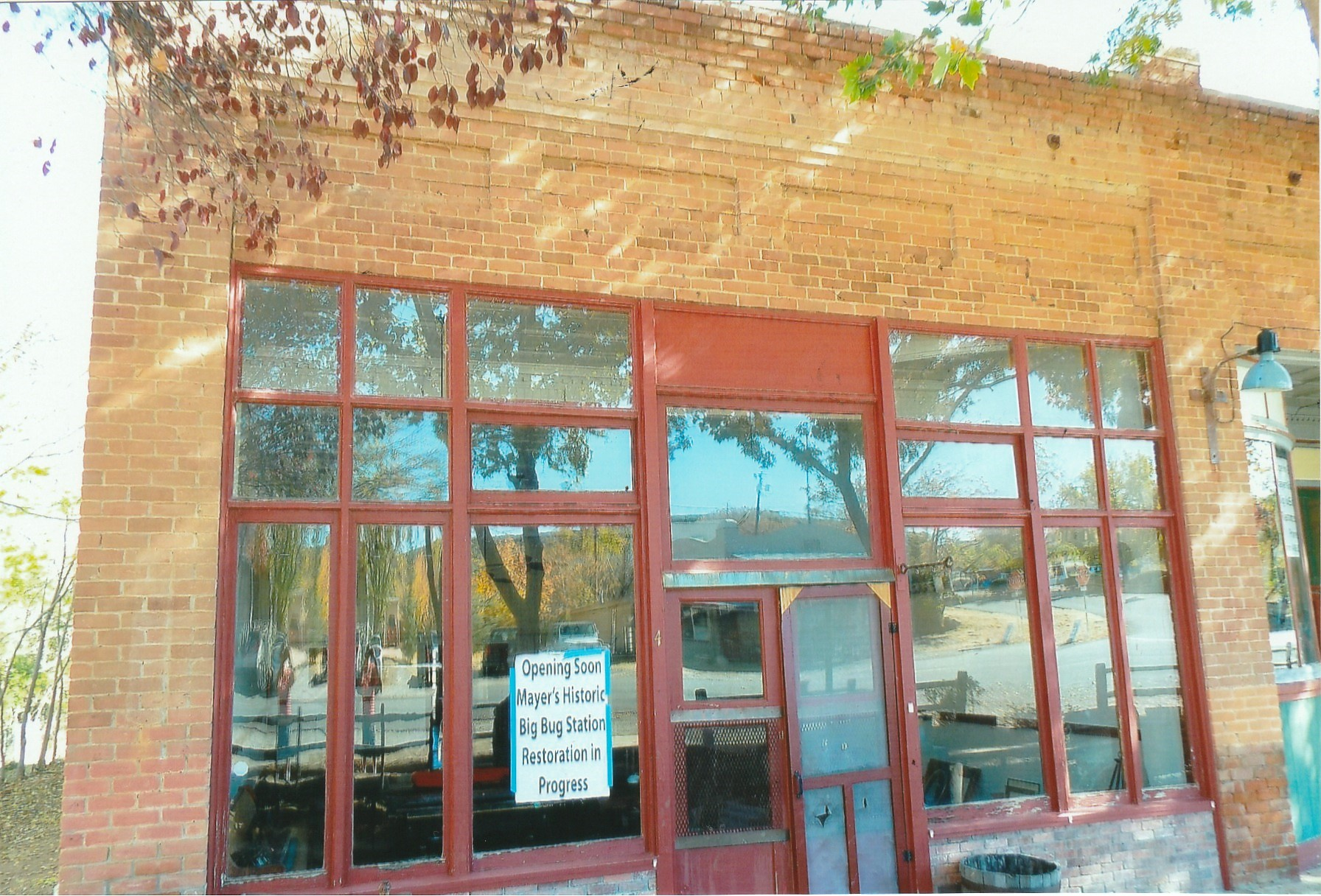
The Mayer Saloon and the Mayer Dance Floor.

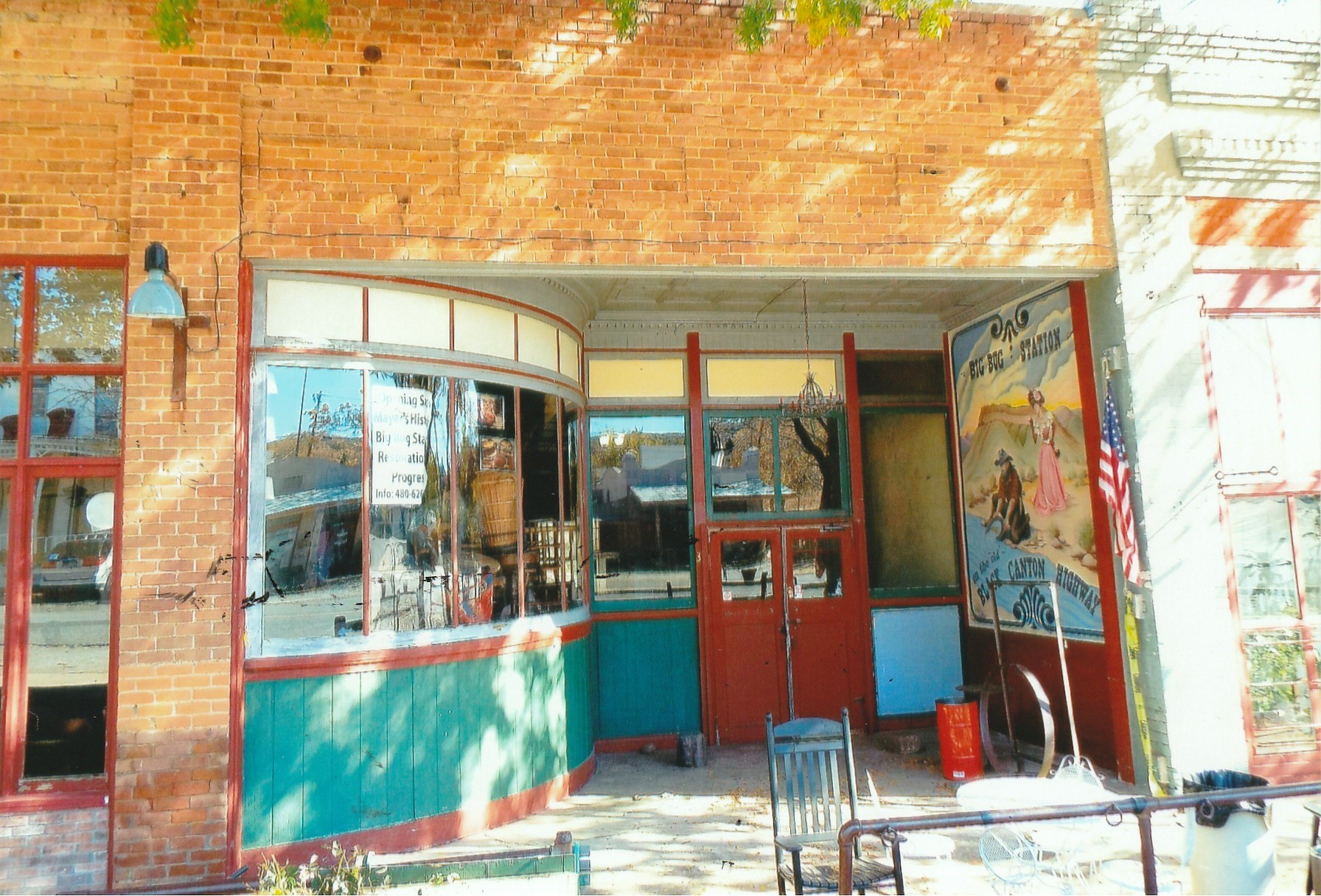
The Barber Shop and Bath House.

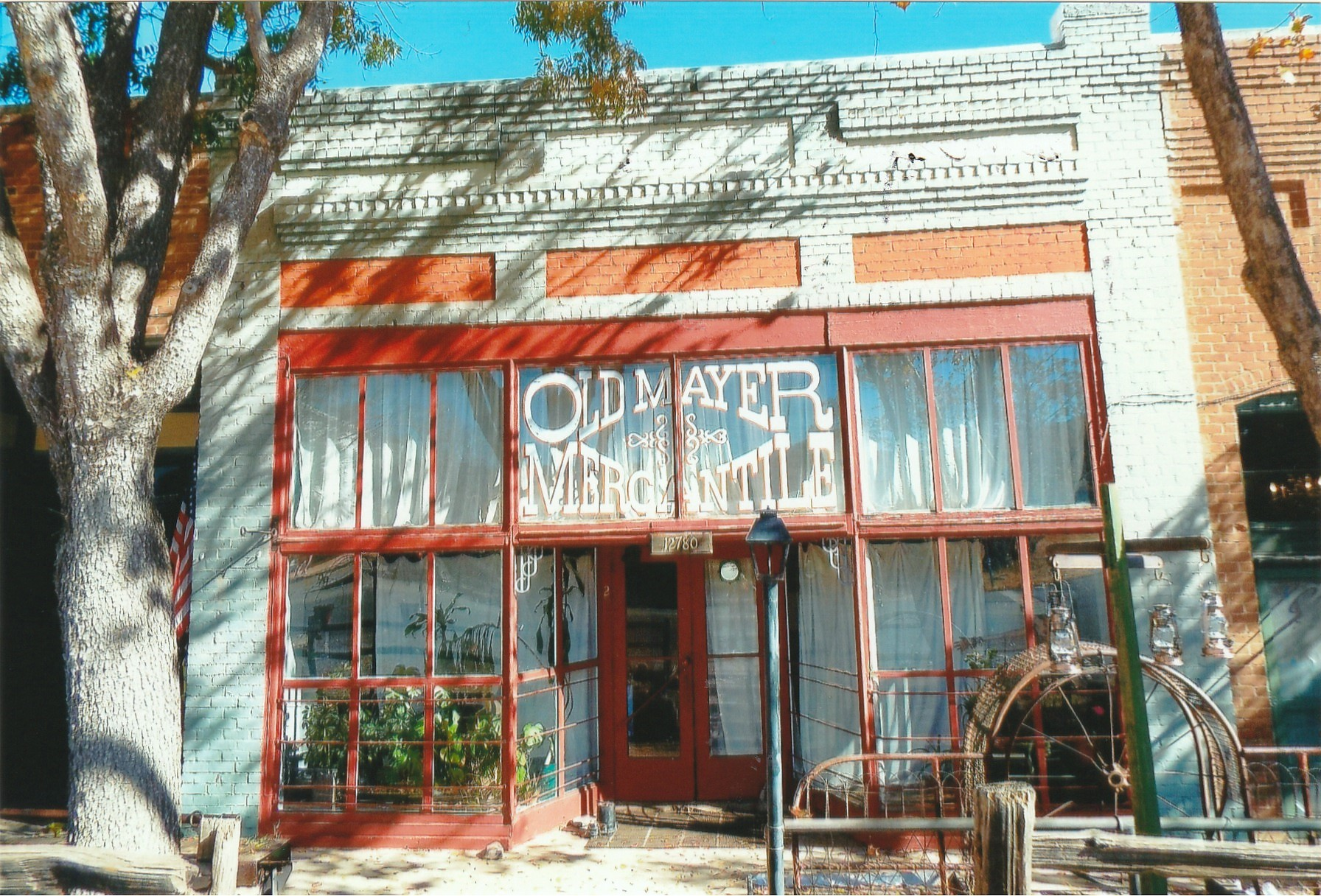
Mayer Mercantile.

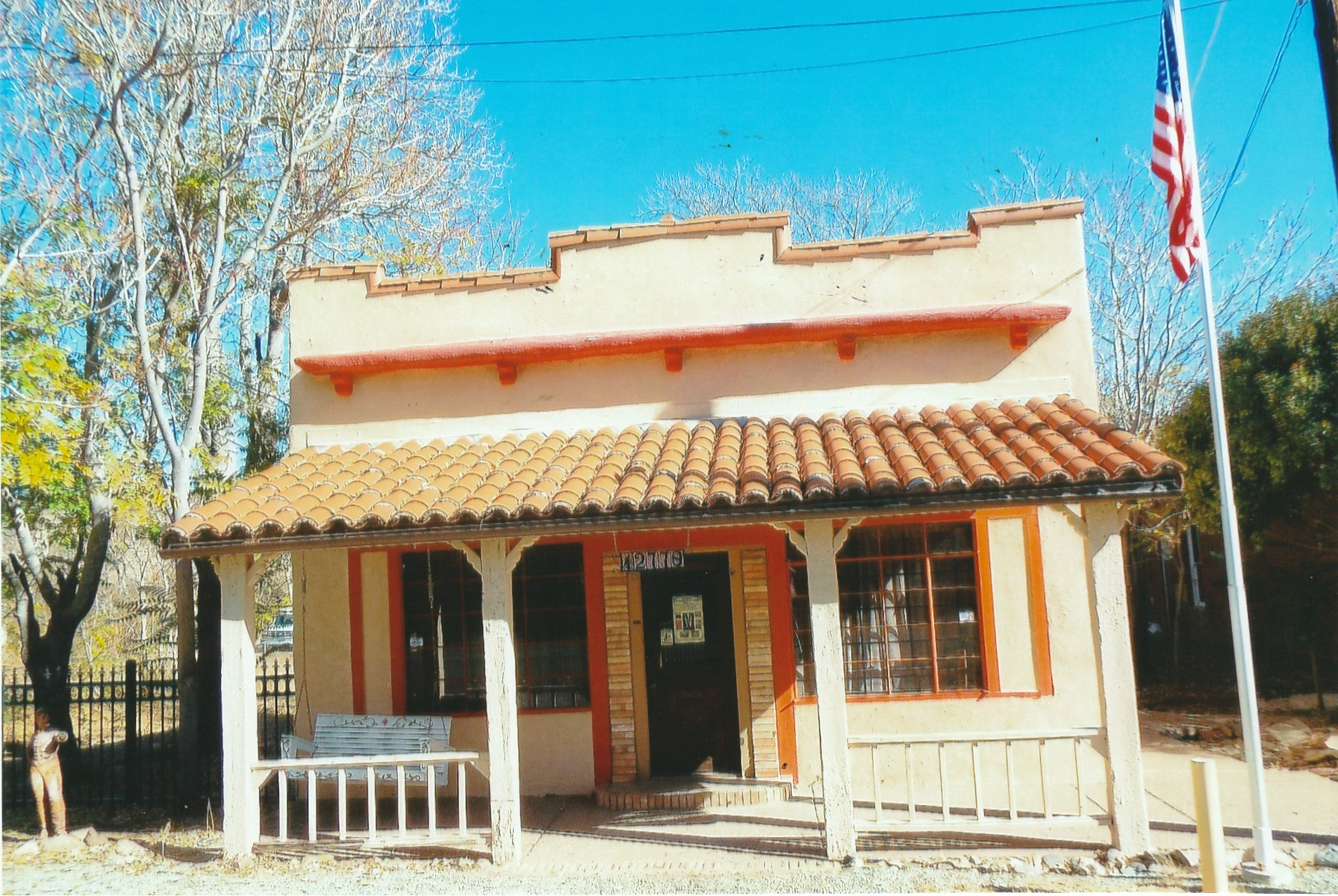
The original Mayer Post Office.

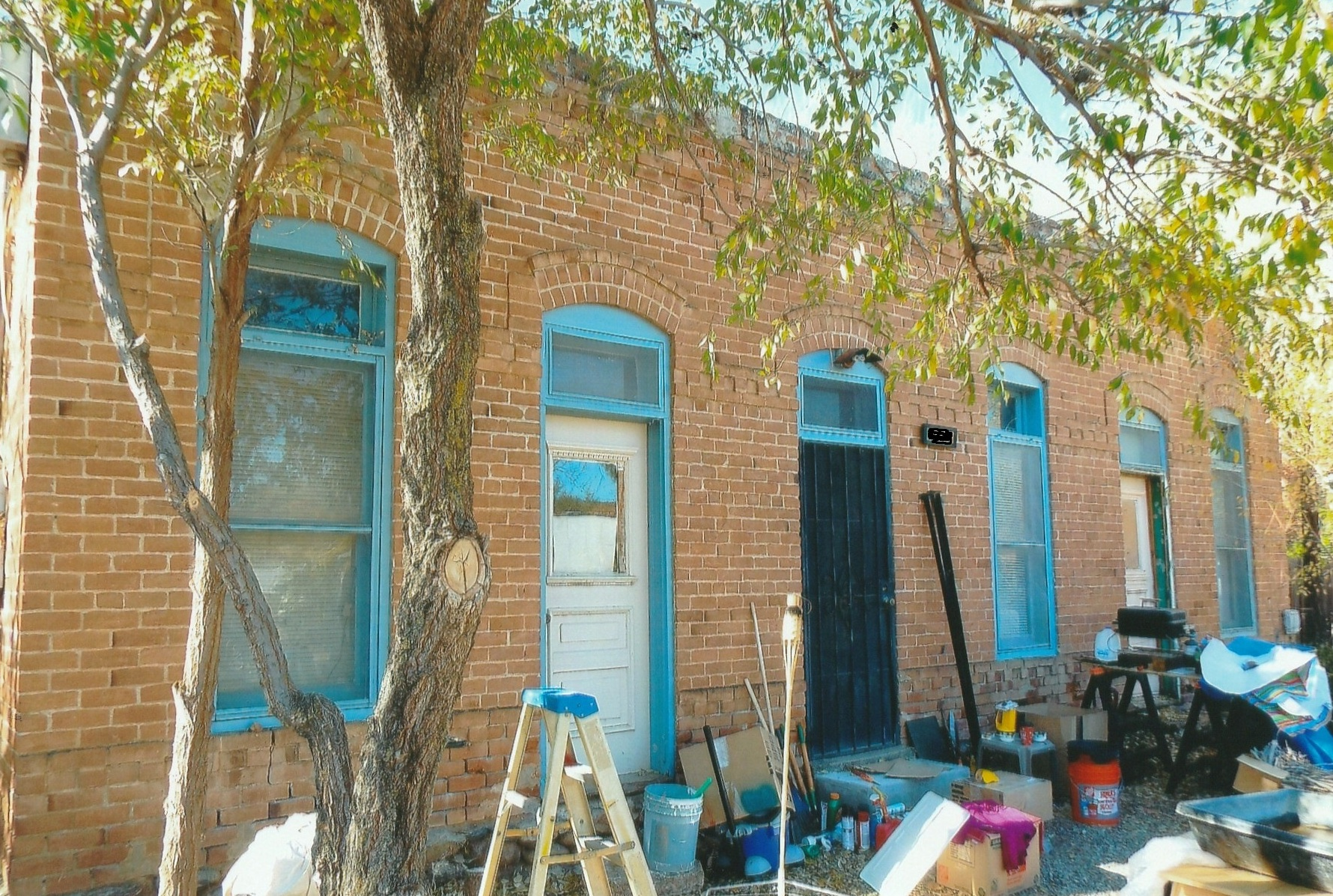
Mayer Apartment #1 once a brothel.

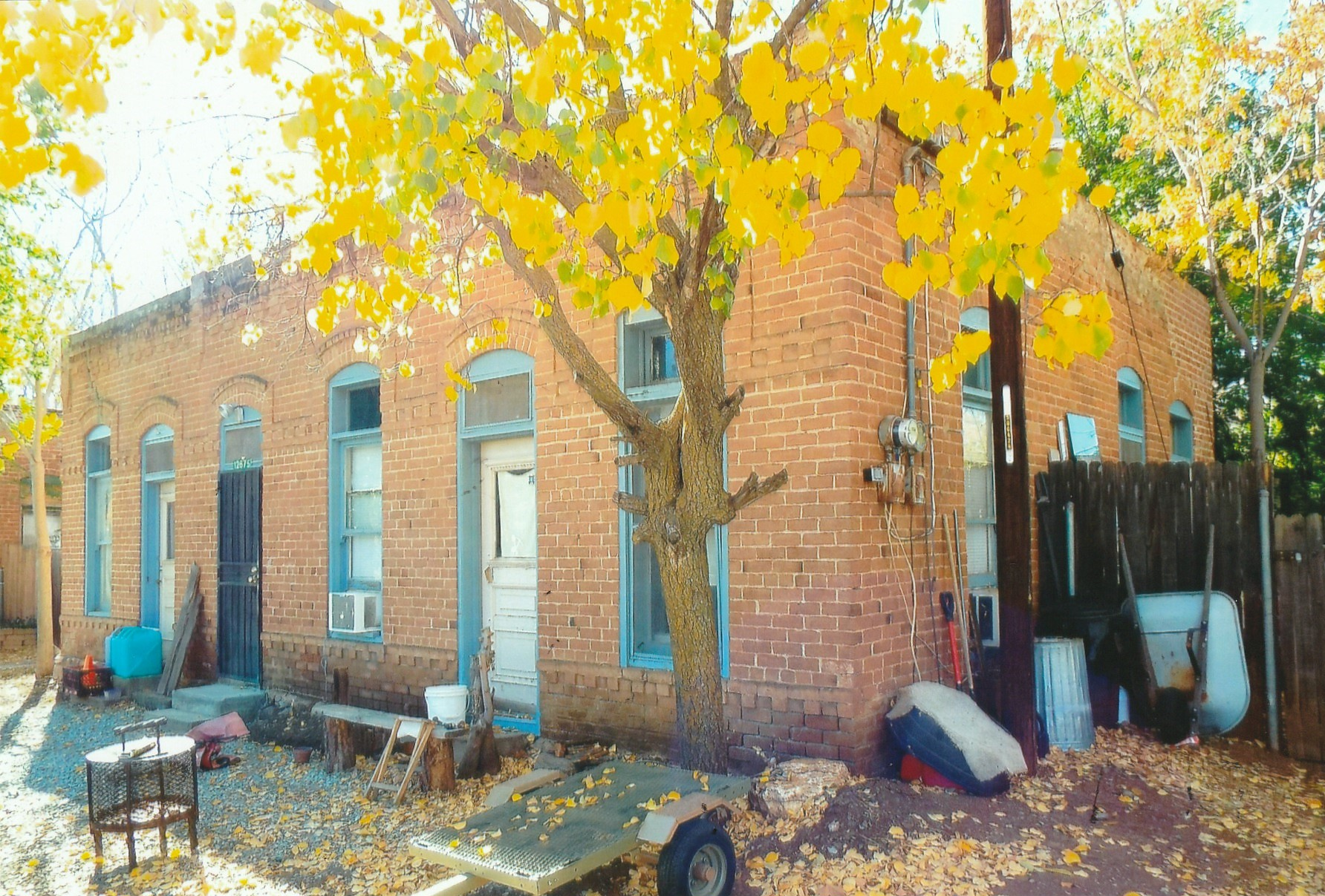
Mayer Apartment #2.

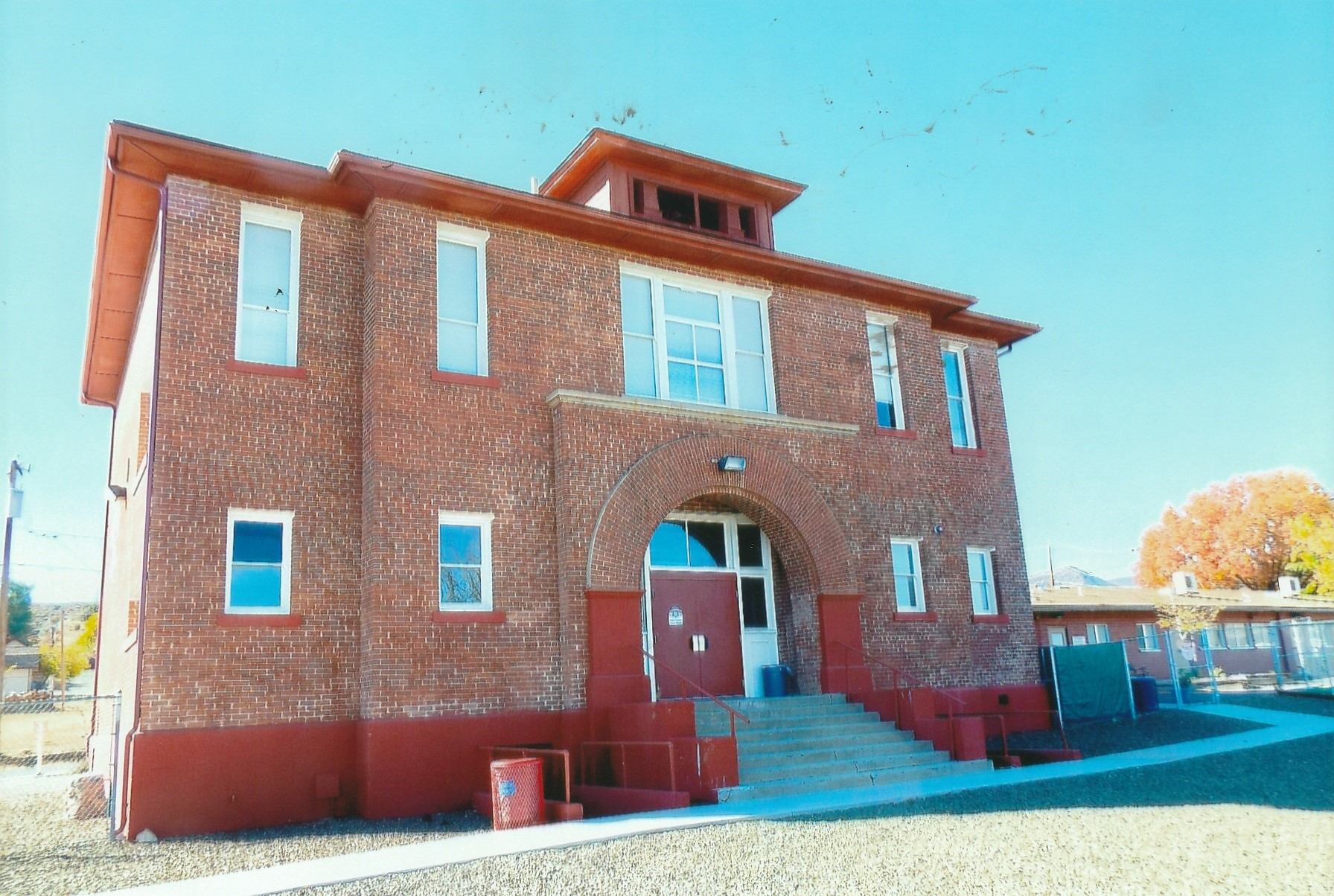
Mayer Red Brick Schoolhouse.

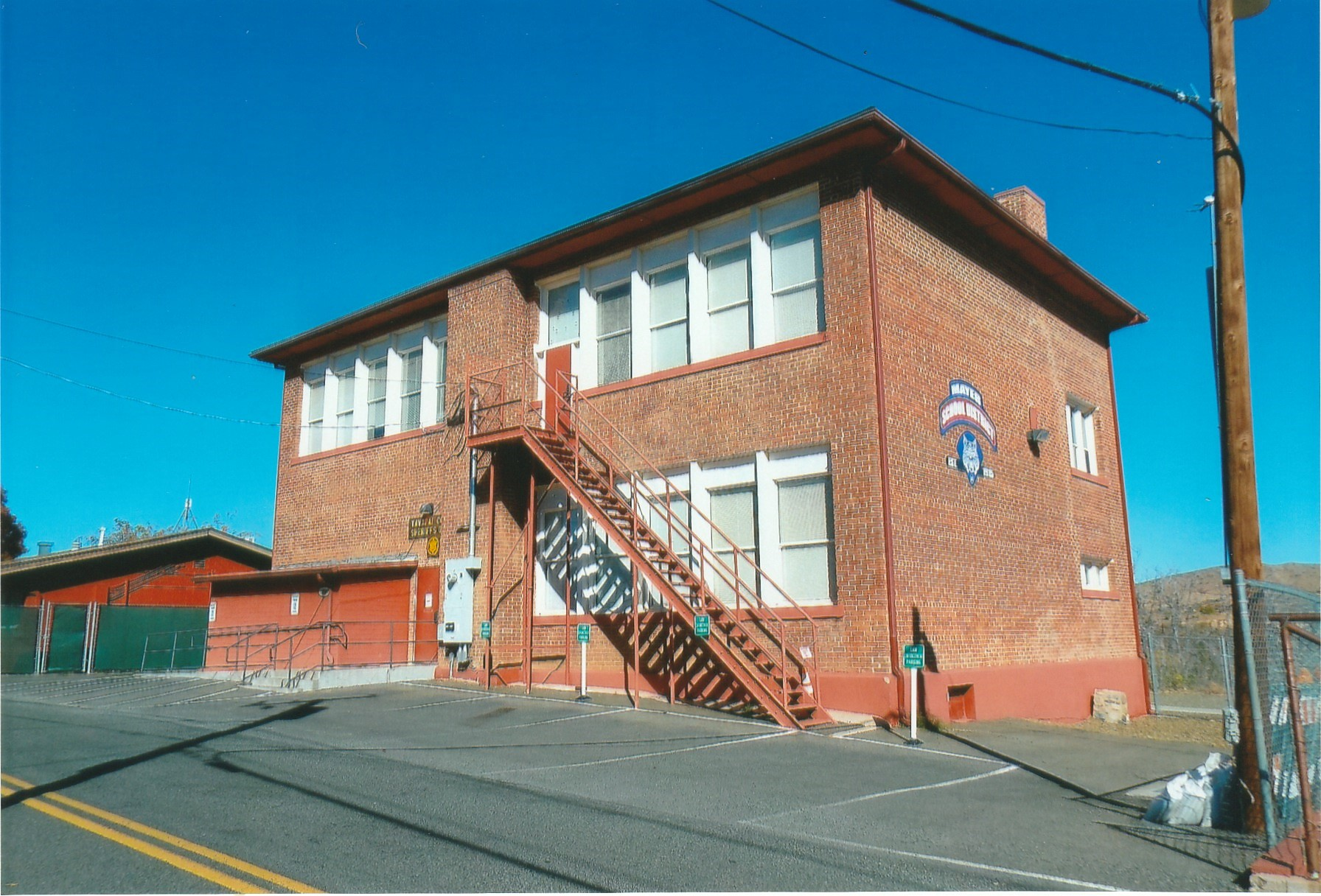
Rear view of the Mayer Red Brick Schoolhouse.

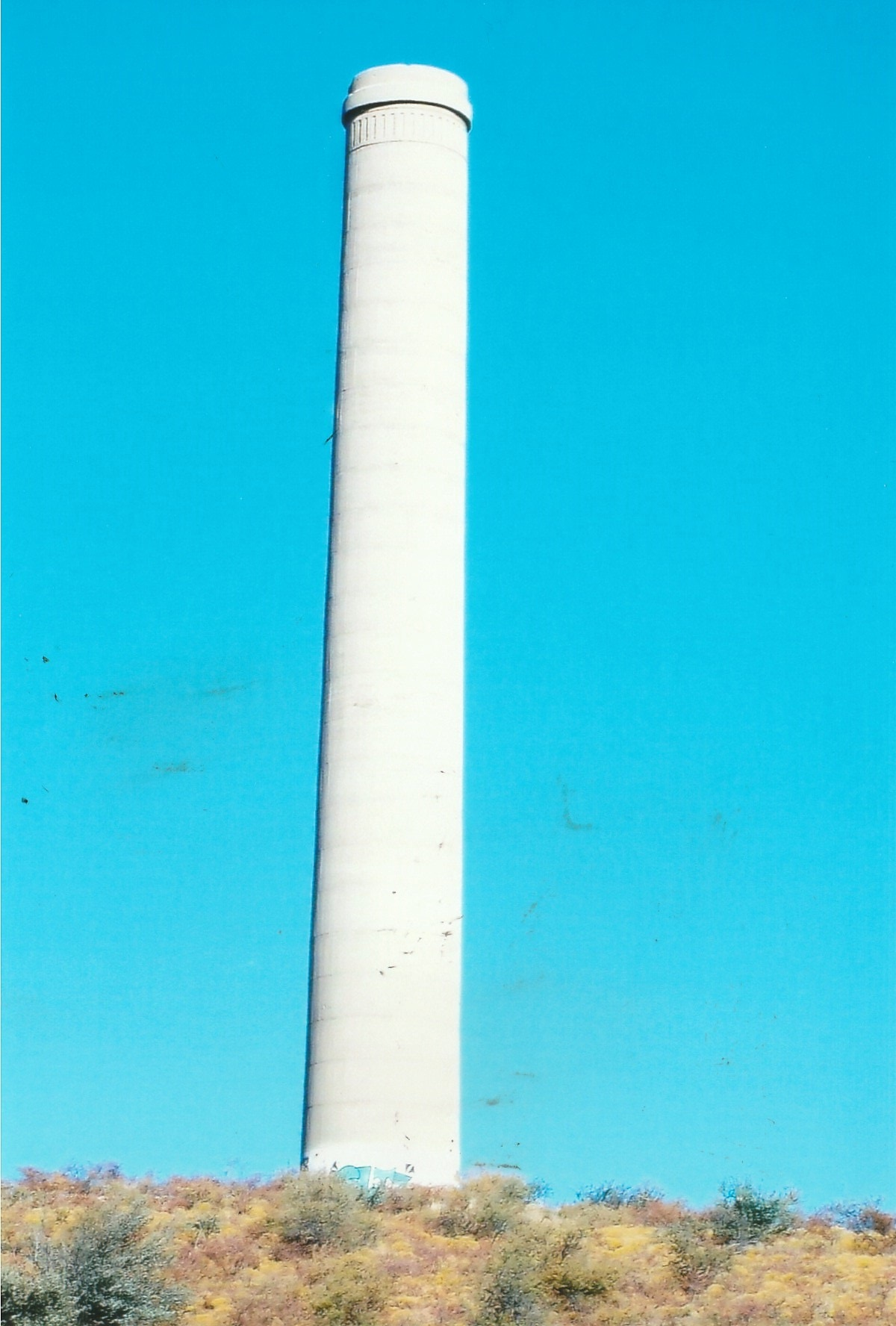
Mayer Smokestack.

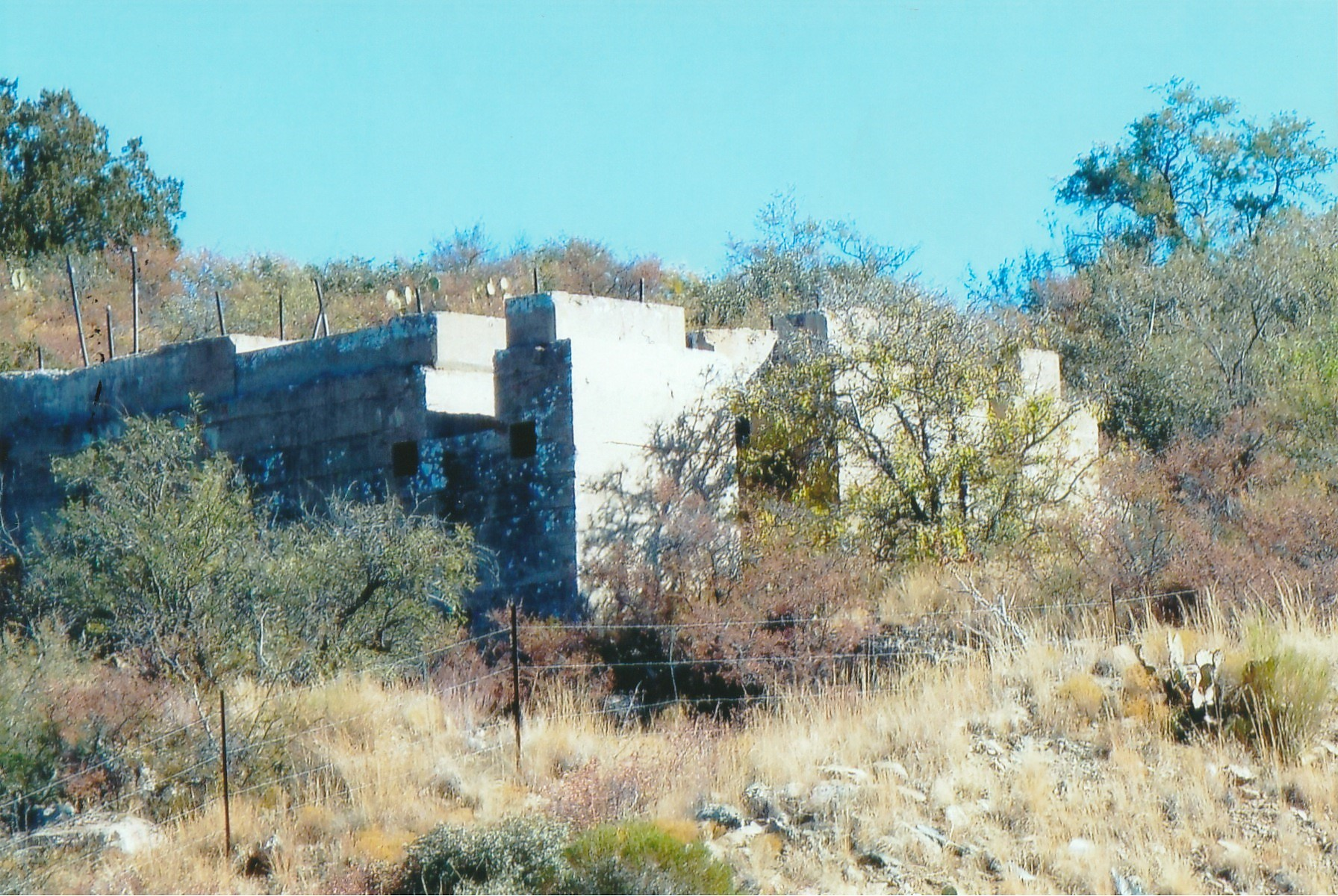
The Smelter ruins.

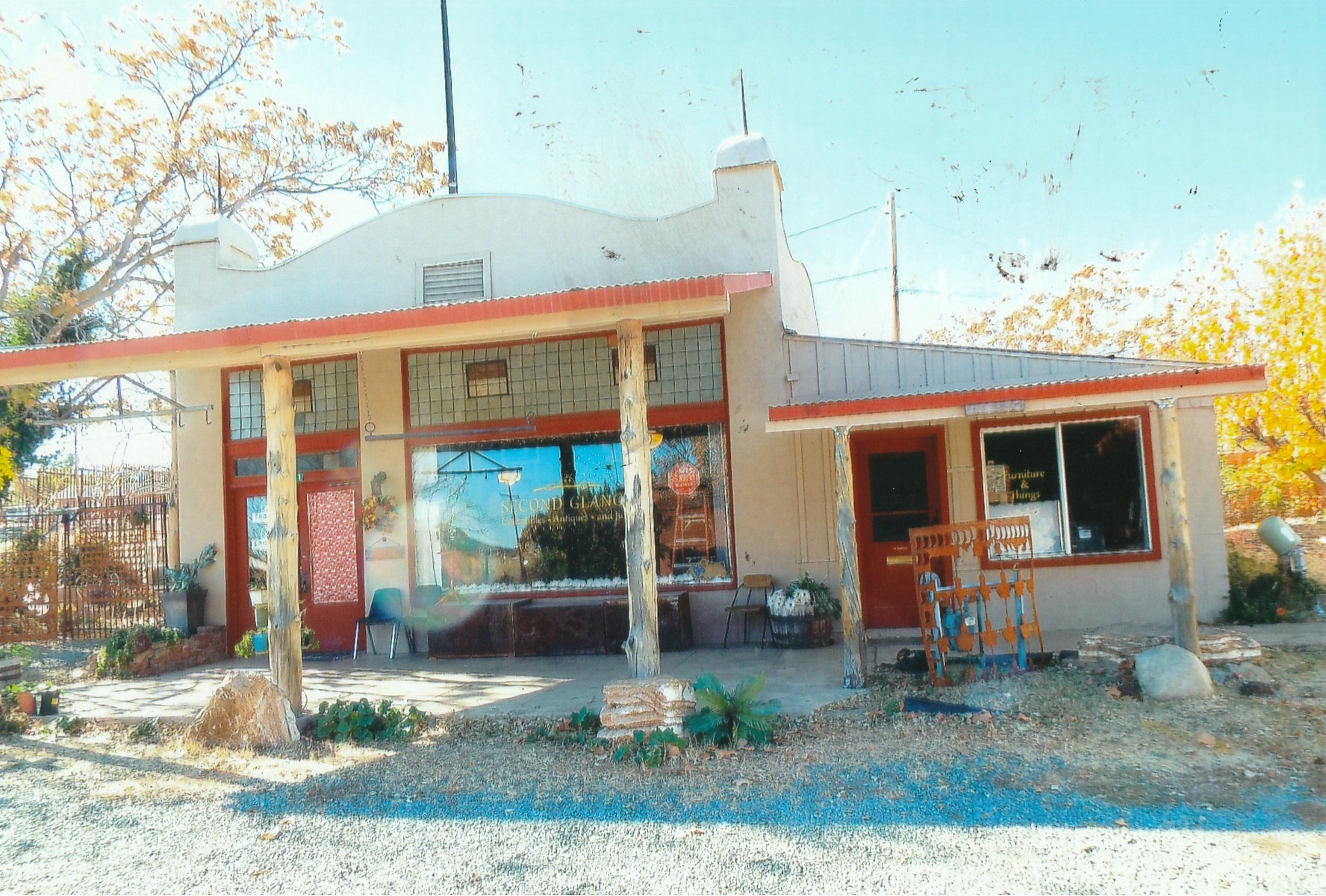
The Mayer Bank building.

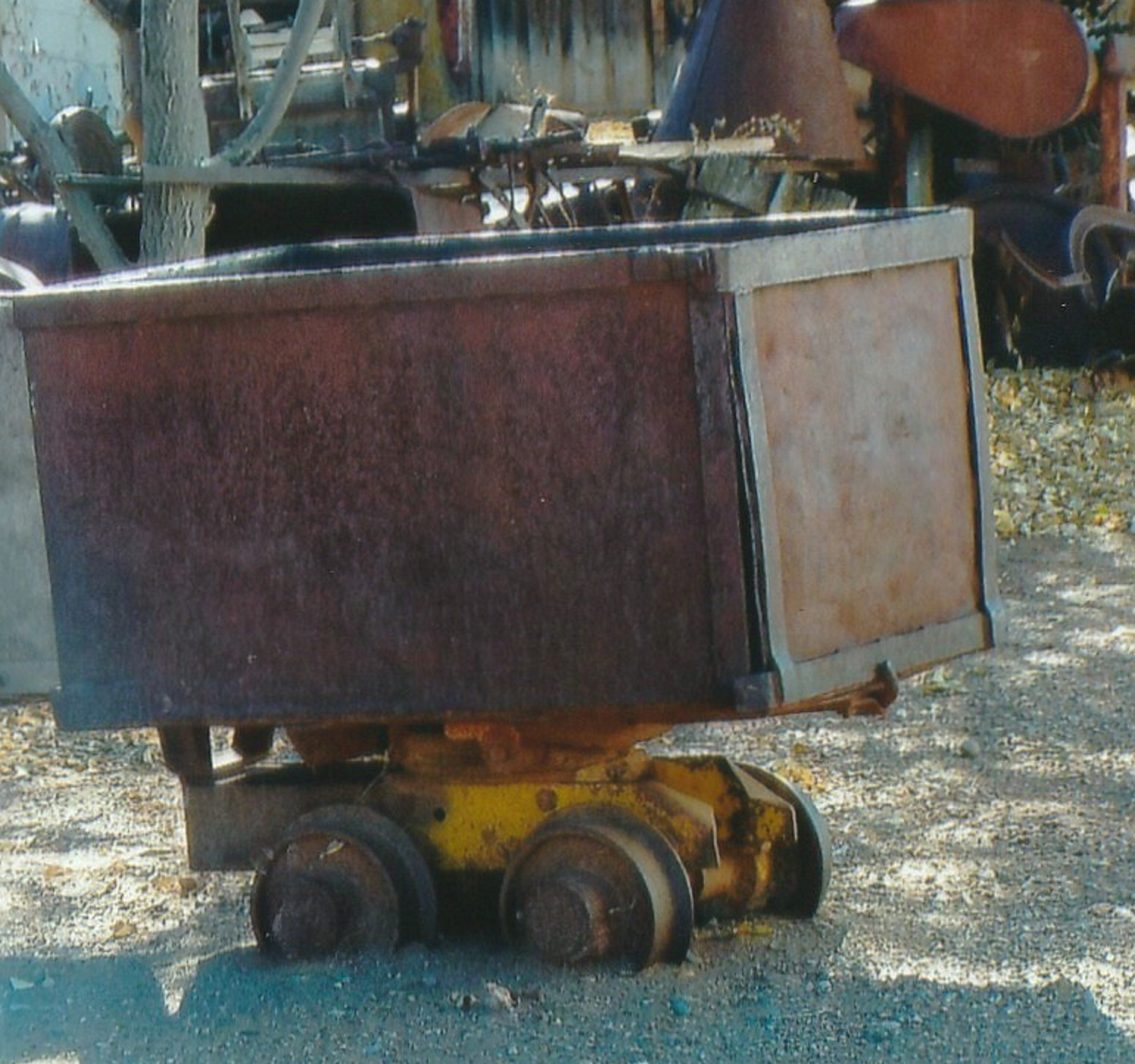
Mine-cart which was used in the Bradshaw Mountains in the 1890s.

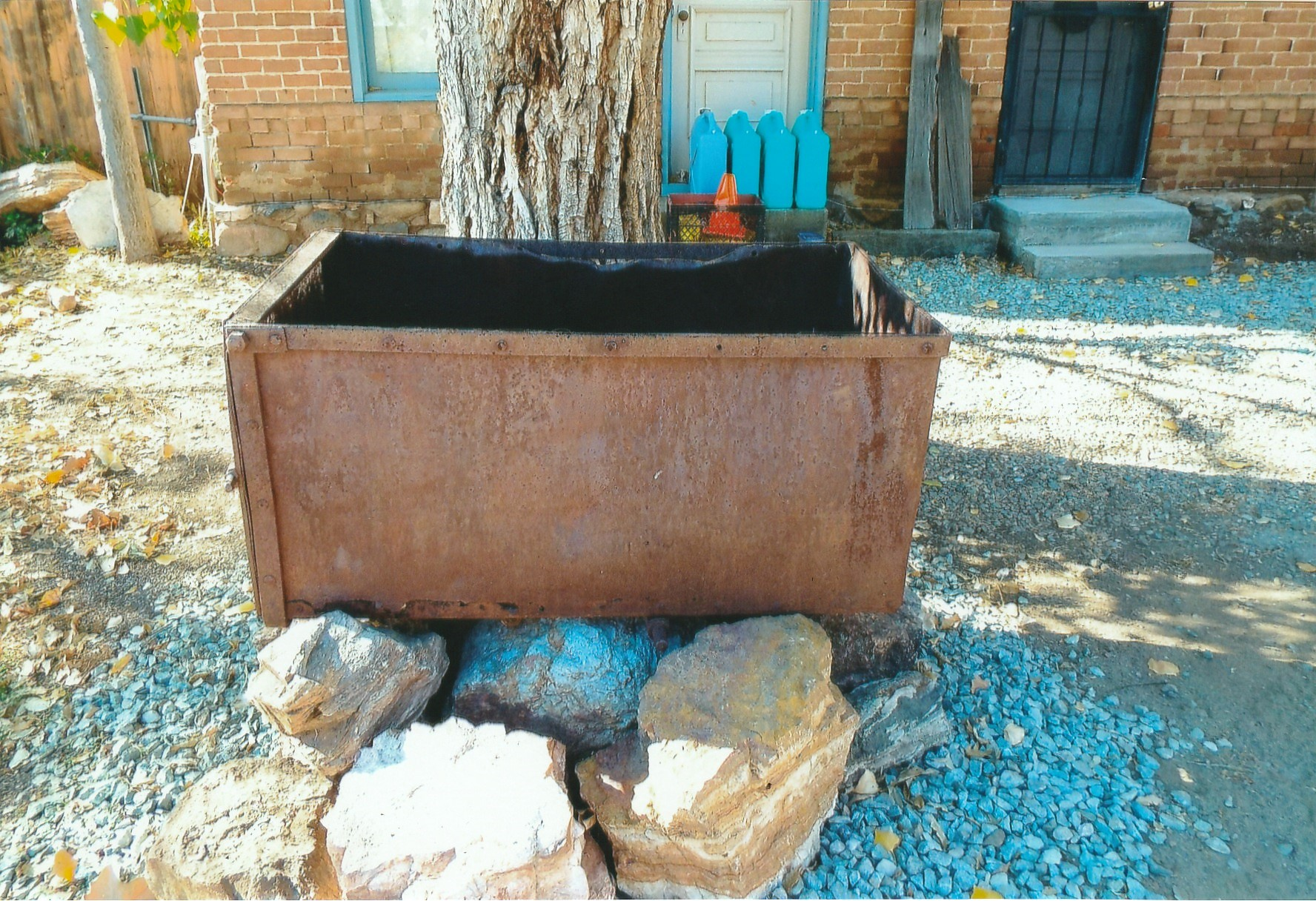
Abandoned mine-cart.

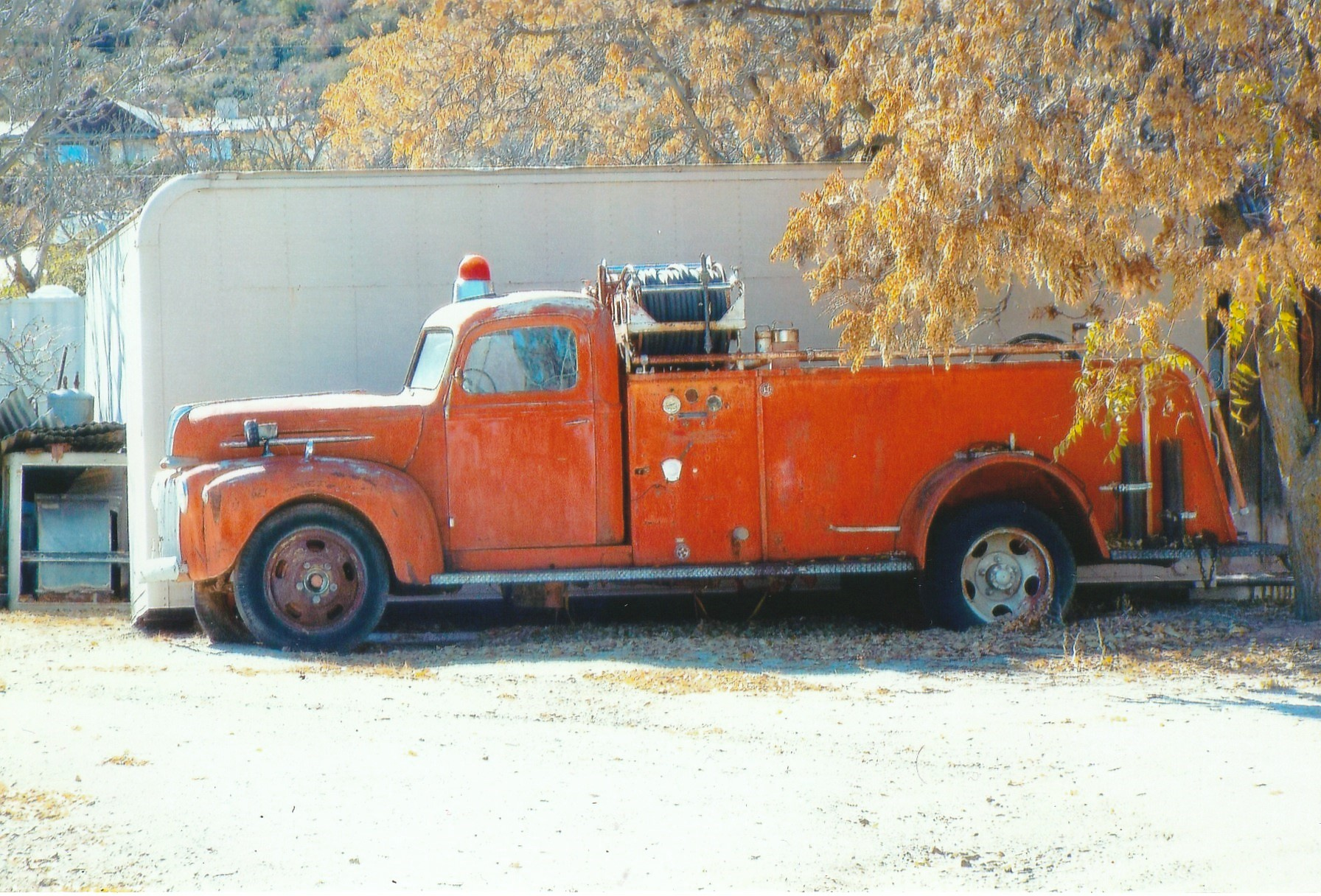
1940 Ford Howard Cooper Fire Truck which once serviced Mayer.

== See also ==
- National Register of Historic Places listings in Yavapai County, Arizona
