= Mayer Unified School District =

School district in Arizona, United States

Mayer Unified School District 43 is a school district in Yavapai County, Arizona.

It operates Mayer Elementary School (a K-8 school) and Mayer High School (grades 9-12).

The district includes the Cordes Lakes and Spring Valley census-designated places, most of the Mayer CDP, and a portion of the Black Canyon City CDP. It also includes Poland Junction.

== History ==
Eli Casey was superintendent for a period until the board of trustees, in April 2000, decided to select a new superintendent.

In 2001 there was a conflict when the board of trustees encountered difficulty agreeing on who would be a new board member. Paul Street, the Superintendent of Schools of Yavapai County, told the Mayer USD board that it would either need to organize a special election, or all existing members would have to collectively pick the new member. All members of the board agreed to select a member, which meant that the district did not have to spend money on organizing the special election. Daily Courier gave a positive reception to that decision.

Pat Dallabetta had been superintendent from sometime around 2001 until 2009, when he decided to retire. In 2010 Mayer USD asked Dean Slaga to become the superintendent. In 2019 Slaga was selected as the "All Arizona Superintendent for Small Districts" for that year.
