= Spring Valley, Arizona =

CDP in Yavapai County, Arizona

- CDP
- Interactive map of Spring Valley, Arizona
- Location within Arizona Location within the United States
- Coordinates: 34.3452°N 112.1592°W
- Country: United States
- State: Arizona
- County: Yavapai

Area
  - Total: 1.019 sq mi (2.639 km^{2})
  - Land: 1.019 sq mi (2.639 km^{2})
  - Water: 0 sq mi (0.000 km^{2}) 0.0%
- Elevation: 3,944 ft (1,202 m)

Population (2020)
  - Total: 1,143
  - Density: 1,122/sq mi (433.1/km^{2})
- Time zone: UTC−7 (Mountain (MST))
- ZIP Code: 86333
- Area code: 928
- FIPS code: 04-69060
- GNIS feature ID: 2408795

Spring Valley is a census-designated place (CDP) in Yavapai County, Arizona, United States. The population was 1,143 as of the 2020 census.

== Geography ==
According to the United States Census Bureau, Spring Valley has a total area of 1.019 square miles (2.64 km^{2}), all land.

== Demographics ==
Historical population
Census	Pop.	Note	%±
2000	1,019		—
2010	1,148		12.7%
2020	1,143		−0.4%
U.S. Decennial Census; 2020 Census

=== Racial and ethnic composition ===
Spring Valley CDP, Arizona – Racial and ethnic composition Note: the US Census treats Hispanic/Latino as an ethnic category. This table excludes Latinos from the racial categories and assigns them to a separate category. Hispanics/Latinos may be of any race.
Race / Ethnicity (NH = Non-Hispanic)	Pop 2000	Pop 2010	Pop 2020	% 2000	% 2010	% 2020
White alone (NH)	950	1,006	909	93.23%	87.63%	79.53%
Black or African American alone (NH)	6	10	8	0.59%	0.87%	0.70%
Native American or Alaska Native alone (NH)	2	15	10	0.20%	1.31%	0.87%
Asian alone (NH)	3	1	6	0.29%	0.09%	0.52%
Native Hawaiian or Pacific Islander alone (NH)	1	0	2	0.10%	0.00%	0.17%
Other race alone (NH)	4	0	8	0.39%	0.00%	0.70%
Mixed race or Multiracial (NH)	5	21	80	0.49%	1.83%	7.00%
Hispanic or Latino (any race)	48	95	120	4.71%	8.28%	10.50%
Total	1,019	1,148	1,143	100.00%	100.00%	100.00%

=== 2020 census ===
As of the 2020 census, Spring Valley had a population of 1,143. The median age was 55.6 years. 15.0% of residents were under the age of 18 and 31.8% of residents were 65 years of age or older. For every 100 females there were 101.6 males, and for every 100 females age 18 and over there were 100.8 males age 18 and over.

Racial composition as of the 2020 census
Race	Number	Percent
White	952	83.3%
Black or African American	8	0.7%
American Indian and Alaska Native	14	1.2%
Asian	6	0.5%
Native Hawaiian and Other Pacific Islander	3	0.3%
Some other races	37	3.2%
Two or more races	123	10.8%

== Education ==
Residents are in the Mayer Unified School District.

Spring Ridge Academy is an all-girls boarding school, for troubled teens, that was founded in 1996.

Yavapai County Free Library District operates the Spring Valley Library.
