= List of people excommunicated by the Catholic Church =

The Catholic Church has excommunicated some of its adherents throughout its existence for various reasons, including heresy, schism, and disobedience to the Church or its teachings.

In Roman Catholic canon law, excommunication is a censure and thus a "medicinal penalty" intended to invite the person to change behavior or attitude that incurred the penalty, repent, and return to full communion. Excommunication severs one from communion with the Church; excommunicated Catholics are forbidden from receiving any sacrament and refused a Catholic burial, but are still bound by canonical obligations such as attending Mass or fasting seasonally. Excommunicated Catholics, however, are barred from receiving the Eucharist or from taking an active part in the liturgy (reading, bringing the offerings, etc.).

Henry IV, Holy Roman Emperor, with 5 separate excommunications from 3 different popes, carries the distinction of publicly being the most excommunicated individual. In this list below there are two popes (Honorius I and Leo I) and seven Catholic saints (Leo I, Athanasius, Columba, Romuald, Arialdo, Joan of Arc, Mary Mackillop) who were issued an excommunication by a church authority.

This list only includes excommunications acknowledged or imposed by a decree of the pope or a bishop in communion with him. Latae sententiae excommunications, those that automatically affect classes of people (members of certain associations or those who perform actions such as directly violating the seal of confession or carrying out an abortion), are not listed unless confirmed by a bishop or ecclesiastical tribunal with respect to certain individuals.

== 1st Millennium ==
=== 1st century ===
- Simon Magus, for attempting to purchase apostleship and for whom simony was named. He is also alleged to have founded Gnosticism by certain Church Fathers.
- An unnamed Corinthian who had married a woman who had been his father's wife as recounted in 1 Corinthians 5:1–8.
- Hymenaeus and Alexander, excommunicated by Saint Paul the Apostle as recounted in 1 Timothy.

=== 2nd century ===
- Valentinus, originator of Valentinianism.
- Marcion of Sinope, originator of Marcionism, excommunicated by Pope Pius I.
- Montanus, originator of Montanism.
- Theodotus of Byzantium, proponent of Adoptionism, excommunicated by Pope Victor I.

=== 3rd century ===
- Sabellius, originator of Sabellianism.
- Novatian, an early antipope who taught Novatianism.
- Paul of Samosata, excommunicated by a synod at Antioch in 269.
- Bishop Marcellus of Ancyra, excommunicated in 336 for believing in a modified form of Sabellianism by a bishops' synod in Constantinople led by Arian bishop Eusebius of Nicomedia. Pope Julius I argued for his innocence to the bishops who excommunicated him, and in 343 the Council of Serdica found Marcellus' book to be without heresy, but Marcellus was never reinstated as bishop nor formally reconciled.
- Felicissimus, a Carthaginian deacon, was excommunicated by Cyprian, Bishop of Carthage. Cyprian was in hiding at the time from persecution and he sent people to distribute alms to those hurt by the persecutions. Felicissimus tried to frustrate the efforts of those distributing alms as he saw it as an encroachment on his office.

=== 4th century ===
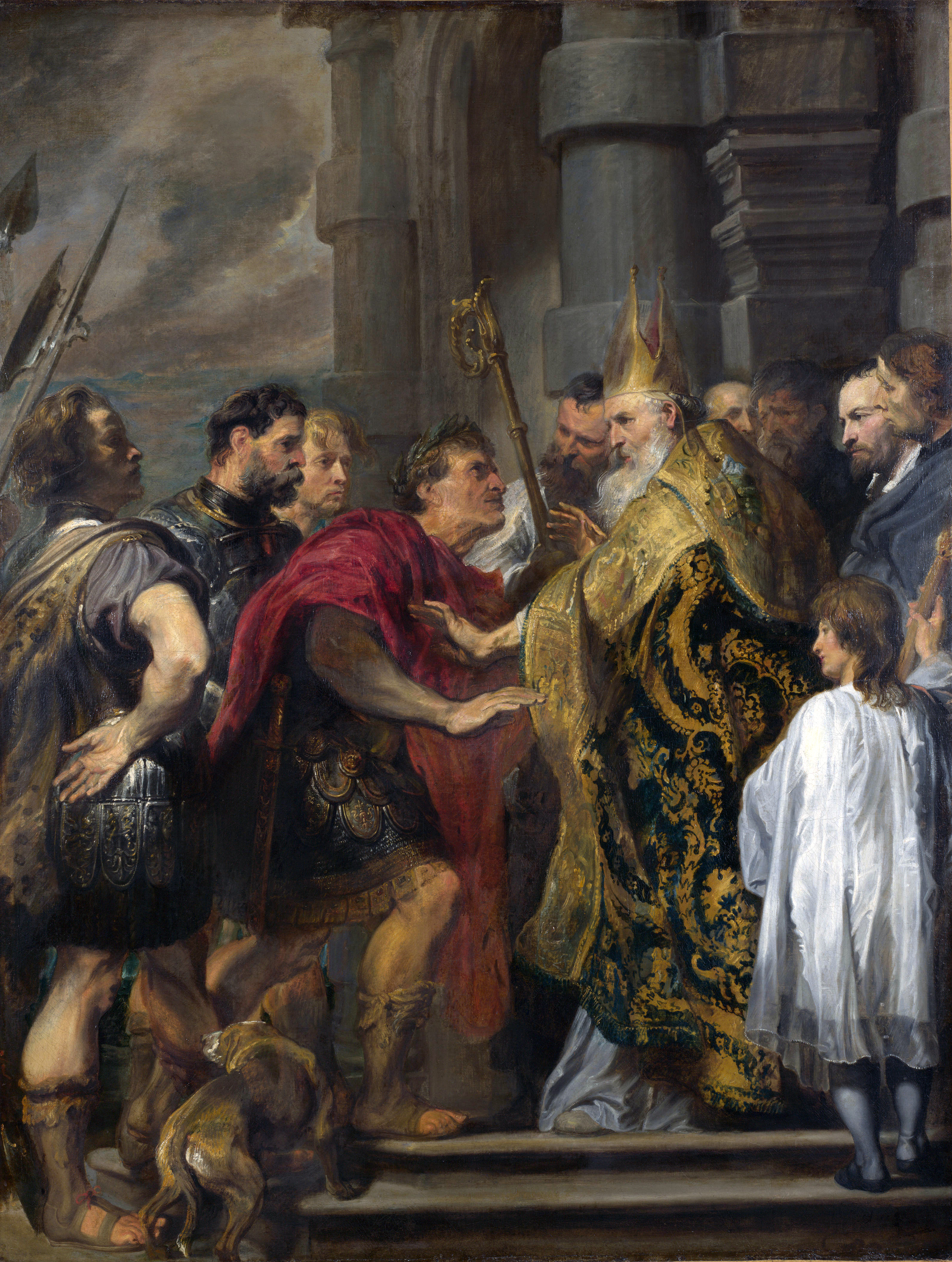
Saint Ambrose barring Theodosius from Milan Cathedral painted in 1619 by Anthony van Dyck. National Gallery, London.

- Arius, Cyrenaic presbyter, namesake of Arianism.
- Celestius, early Pelagian leader.
- Roman Emperor Theodosius I was excommunicated by the Bishop of Milan, Saint Ambrose, for authorizing the Massacre of Thessalonica. After repentance, penance and restitution, the Emperor was restored to communion with the Church.
- Supporters of Antipope Ursicinus were excommunicated by a Roman synod after they accused Pope Damasus I of adultery in a Roman court in 378.
- Auxentius of Milan, an Arian bishop, was excommunicated by the Roman synod of 369.
- Saint Athanasius was excommunicated by Pope Liberius allegedly for refusing to attend a synod. Athanasius believed the pope was acting under duress (the pope had been exiled from Rome) and refused to accept the validity of the excommunication.
- Some Egyptian monks, by Theophilus I of Alexandria. Four of these monks, namely the Tall Brothers, went to Constantinople, where their presence resulted in accusations made against John Chrysostom.

=== 5th century ===
- Archbishop Nestorius of Constantinople, namesake of Nestorianism.
- Archimandrite Eutyches, founder of Eutychianism, along with his monastery, was excommunicated by Archbishop Flavian of Constantinople.
- Pope Dioscorus I of Alexandria, who presided over the Robber Council of Ephesus.
- Patriarch John of Antioch and his party by the Council of Ephesus in 431.
- Peter the Tanner, Patriarch of Antioch was excommunicated by Pope Felix III at a synod in Rome for heresy.
- Peter Mongus, Patriarch of Alexandria was excommunicated by Felix III.
- Patriarch Acacius of Constantinople was excommunicated by Felix III on account of his receiving the excommunicated Peter Mongus into communion. This led to the Acacian schism.
- Papal legates that were sent by Pope Felix III to Constantinople were excommunicated by Pope Felix III. They were sent to call Acacius to explain his conduct and urge the Byzantine Emperor to depose Peter Mongus from his see. After being imprisoned and threatened after arriving at Constantinople, they caved in and held communion with heretics, which led to the pope excommunicating them.
- Monks in Constantinople were excommunicated by Nestorius, Archbishop of Constantinople, on account of their opposition to his teachings. This took place before Nestorius himself was excommunicated by the Council of Ephesus. The monks appealed to the Emperor Theodosius II to help them against Nestorius, who later summoned the Council of Ephesus.
- Ibas of Edessa was excommunicated by the Robber Council of Ephesus in 449. This council and its decisions were themselves overturned two years later at the Council of Chalcedon.
- Theodoret, Bishop of Cyrrhus, was excommunicated by the Robber Council of Ephesus. This council and its decisions were themselves overturned two years later at the Council of Chalcedon.
- Pope Leo I was excommunicated by Dioscorus I, Patriarch of Alexandria and ten bishops. Pope Leo would later excommunicate Dioscorus and all others who participated in the Robber Council of Ephesus.
- Classicianus, a Roman official was excommunicated along with his entire household by a bishop named Auxilius after he had entered a church to seize several perjurers. Classicianus wrote afterwards to Augustine of Hippo to intercede for him to Auxilius. Augustine then wrote to Auxilius on Classicianus's behalf.

=== 6th century ===
- Macliau, Bishop of Vannes was excommunicated after he abandoned his episcopacy and religious vows to become Count of Vannes in 560.
- King Charibert I of Paris by Bishop Germain of Paris for immorality.
- Saint Columba was excommunicated in 562 by the synod of Teltown for allegedly praying for the winning side in an Irish War. The excommunication was later held to be an abuse of justice and the bishops in question removed their charge.
- The sons of Conall mac Domnaill by Saint Columba some time in the late sixth century, due to their persecution of churches.
- Archbishop Theodore of Mopsuestia by the Second Council of Constantinople.
- Leudaste, Count of Tours, by a synod of bishops in 581 on account of creating scandals and false accusations he made against Bishop Gregory of Tours.
- A layman named Pelagius was excommunicated by Gregory of Tours in the late sixth century after the former had beaten and robbed some of Gregory's men. Gregory later received him back into communion after he and others made oaths.
- Eulalius, future Count of Auvergne was excommunicated by Cautinus, Bishop of Clermont as a young man as a result of suspicion of murdering his mother. He protested his innocence and Cautinus agreed to allow him to return to communion.
- Basina, daughter of Chilperic I, her cousin Chrodield, daughter of the previously excommunicated Charibert I, and their party were excommunicated by a synod of bishops who condemned them for a violent monastic rebellion at Holy Cross Abbey in Poitiers in 589.

=== 7th century ===
- Ecumenical Patriarch Pyrrhus of Constantinople was excommunicated in 648 by Pope Theodore I and a synod of bishops after he had gone back on his recantation of monothelitism. The pope and the bishops also declared him deposed from his see. Theodore reportedly signed the excommunication upon St Peter's tomb using ink that was mingled with drops of Communion wine.
- Ecumenical Patriarch Paul II of Constantinople was excommunicated and deposed from his see in 649 by Pope Theodore I after he had professed Monothelitism.
- Pope Honorius I was posthumously named as excommunicated by the Third Council of Constantinople and by Pope Leo II in a 682 letter to Byzantine Emperor Constantine IV.
- John Philoponus was posthumously named excommunicated by the Third Council of Constantinople. He was condemned by the council as being a 'tritheist'.
- An unnamed nobleman was excommunicated by Cedd, Bishop of London on account of an unlawful marriage he was in. According to Bede, this noble was one of the assassins of Sigeberht the Good.

=== 8th century ===
- Mystic preachers Aldebert and Clement by a German council headed by Saint Boniface in 745. Clement's excommunication was subsequently upheld by Rome, while Aldebert's was not.
- The Second Council of Nicaea posthumously excommunicated a number of clergy and theologians by name who had centuries past, some of whom had already been condemned, including: Arius and his followers, Macedonius I of Constantinople, Nestorius and his followers, Eutyches, Dioscorus, Severus of Antioch and Peter the Fuller along with those with them, Origen, Didymus the Blind, Evagrius Ponticus, as well as Sergius I of Constantinople, Pyrrhus of Constantinople, Pope Honorius I, Cyrus of Alexandria, and Macarius I of Antioch along with their followers.
- A diaconissa named Epiphania was excommunicated by a synod in Rome in 721 that dealt with the issue of illicit conjugal relations.

=== 9th century ===
- The Fourth Council of Constantinople excommunicated by name and upheld a number of previous excommunications of previous councils of a number of people who had died in previous centuries. Those names in this list were: Arius and his followers, Macedonius I of Constantinople, Nestorius, Eutyches, Dioscorus, Severus of Antioch, Peter the Fuller, Zoharas the Syrian, Origen, Theodore of Mopsuestia, Didymus the Blind, Evagrius Ponticus, Theodore of Pharan, Sergius I of Constantinople, Pyrrhus of Constantinople, Peter of Constantinople, Paul II of Constantinople, Pope Honorius I, Cyrus of Alexandria, Macarius I of Antioch and his disciple Stephen, Anastasius of Constantinople, Constantine II of Constantinople, Nicetas I of Constantinople, Theodosius III of Ephesus, Sisinnius Pastilas, Basil Tricacabus, Theodoret, Anthony and John (priests of Constantinople) and Theodore Krithinos. Ecumenical Patriarch Photios I of Constantinople was also named as excommunicated by the council.
- John VIII, Archbishop of Ravenna, was excommunicated by Pope Nicholas I for various crimes, including the forging of documents to support claims against the Roman See, making unjust demands on suffragan bishops for money, illegally imprisoning priests and maltreating papal legates. He later submitted to the pope at the Roman synod in 861. However, he was excommunicated a second time after he entered into a pact with the excommunicated Archbishops of Trier and Cologne. He submitted again to the pope after this second excommunication and was reconciled.
- Ingiltrud, wife of Boso the Elder, Count of Turin, was excommunicated by bishops in the empire of Charles the Bald at the direction of Pope Nicholas I after she left her husband for a secret lover and didn't respond to a summons to appear before the Synod of Milan in 860.
- Judith of Flanders, Frankish princess and daughter of Charles the Bald was excommunicated by Frankish bishops after she married Baldwin I, Margrave of Flanders without her father's consent.
- Photios I, Ecumenical Patriarch of Constantinople was excommunicated by Pope Nicholas I in 863 on grounds that he had raised himself to the Patriarchal See in violation of canon law. He had been consecrated bishop by Gregory Asbestas, who was already excommunicated; he hadn't obeyed the interstices, the mandatory waiting period for ordination between different orders, and Ignatios of Constantinople was considered to still be the Patriarch of Constantinople. He was named as excommunicated in the 869–870 Fourth Council of Constantinople. When Ignatios of Constantinople died in 877, Pope John VIII agreed to restore him to communion and confirm him as Ecumenical Patriarch. However, he was excommunicated again by Pope John after he held a synod in 879 that sought to revoke the acts of the Fourth Council of Constantinople.
- Gregory Asbestas was excommunicated by Patriarch Ignatios of Constantinople for insubordination in relation to his consecration of Photios.
- Rodoald of Porto and Zachary of Anagni, were excommunicated by Pope Nicholas I in 863 at a synod in the Lateran. The two men had served as papal legates to Constantinople with direction to hear the two sides in the dispute between Photios and Ignatios, who both claimed to be rightful Patriarchs of Constantinople. They received bribes and passed a ruling in the pope's name in support of Photios.
- Gunther, Archbishop of Cologne and Thietgaud, Archbishop of Trier, were excommunicated by Pope Nicholas I at a synod in October 863. The two bishops had given approval for the divorce and remarriage of King Lothair II. Gunther's excommunication was lifted in 869 by Pope Adrian II after Gunther made a public retraction but his clerical status was not restored and he was instead placed in a state of lay communion.

== 2nd Millennium ==
=== 10th century ===
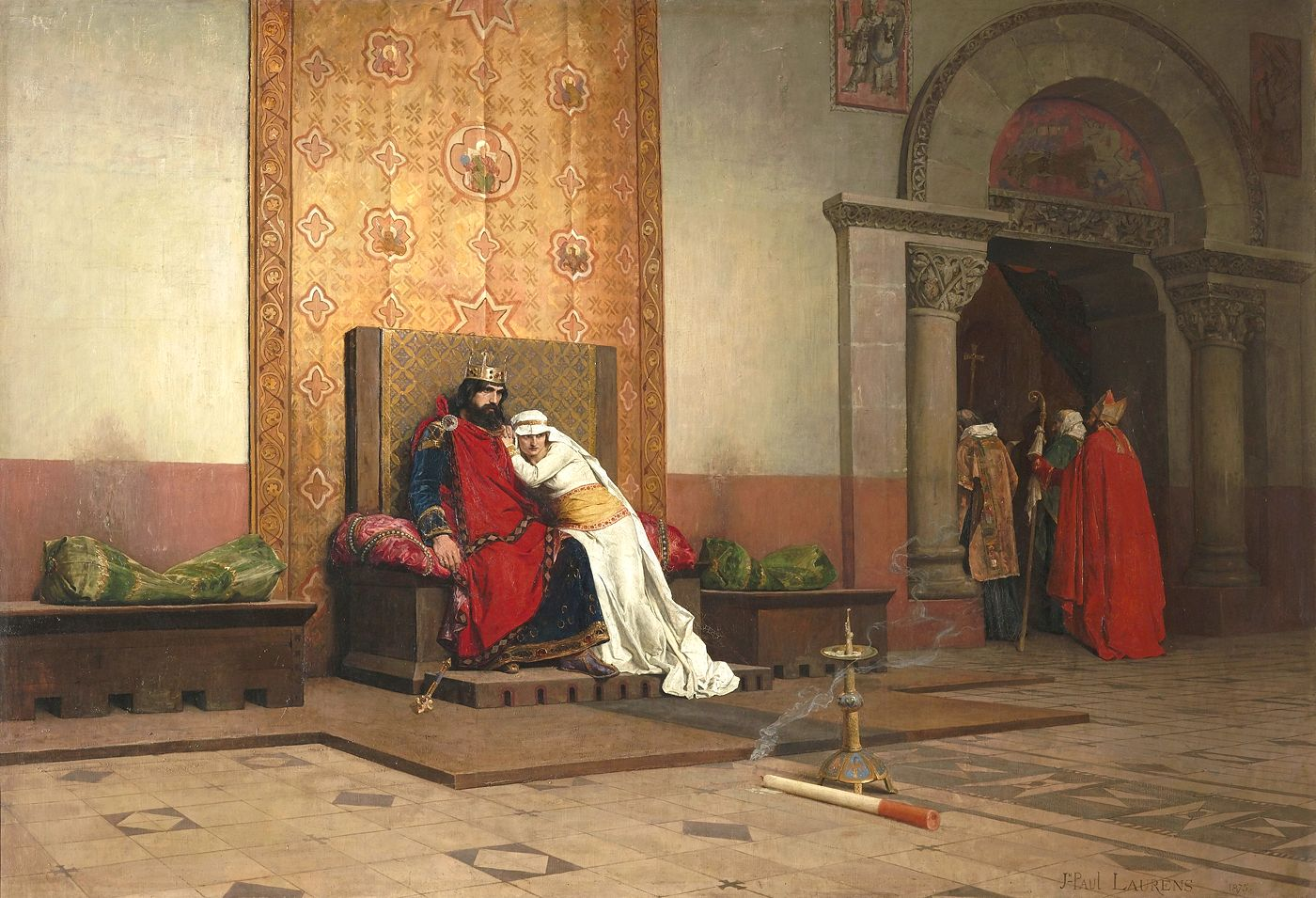
Painting of the excommunication of Robert the Pious

- In 998, Robert II of France, who had been insisting on his right to appoint bishops, was ultimately forced to back down, after being excommunicated by Pope Gregory V and ultimately also to put aside his wife Bertha of Burgundy who had also been excommunicated. The stated reason was the degree of consanguinity between the two. They had the marriage annulled by Pope Sylvester II in 1000 and were reinstated.

=== 11th century ===
- St Romuald was excommunicated for half a year and then later exonerated for the accusation that had brought the excommunication.
- Bishops in France, under orders of Pope Benedict VIII, excommunicated feudal barons who had seized property belonging to Cluny Abbey in 1016.
- In 1031 the Council of Limoges in France excommunicated feudal barons in the Diocese of Limoges who were conducting private warfare between themselves in the midst of widespread famine and pestilence that was killing off a large portion of the peasantry. The famine and pestilence were thought to be punishments from God for grave sins being committed close to the millennium anniversary of Christ's death and resurrection. The members of the council dashed their candles to the ground in unison after calling out 'As these lights are extinguished before your eyes, so let their joy be extinguished before the angels.'
- Heribert, Archbishop of Milan, was excommunicated by Pope Benedict IX when he was at enmity with him.
- Michael Cerularius, Ecumenical Patriarch of Constantinople, along with Leo of Ohrid and their adherents, were excommunicated in 1054 after he had erased the pope's name from church diptychs in Constantinople and accused the western Church of heresy. The excommunication was carried out by legates of Pope Leo IX after the pope's death. This excommunication was only directed at these individuals named and not at the wider eastern church; the legates specifically made note that they considered the wider eastern church to remain pious and orthodox. However, in the ensuing years, most of the eastern bishops followed Cerularius and also ceased recognition of the pope by striking his name from their diptychs. This led to the East–West Schism. The legal validity of this excommunication has been questioned as it was issued by legates of Pope Leo IX after the pope's death. It was declared lifted on 7 December 1965.
- Arialdo was excommunicated by Guido da Velate, Bishop of Milan while he was working against clerical abuses in Milan. He was immediately reinstated by Pope Stephen IX.
- Guido da Velate was excommunicated in turn because of repeated lapses in his failure to reform.
- Harold II, King of England, excommunicated for possibly politically motivated reasons by Pope Alexander II in order to justify the invasion and takeover of the kingdom by William the Conqueror in 1066.
- Henry IV, Holy Roman Emperor was excommunicated four times in the eleventh century (and would later be excommunicated a fifth time in the twelfth century). He was excommunicated by Pope Gregory VII three separate times, and once more by Pope Urban II. The first was on 22 February 1076 over the Investiture Controversy. This excommunication was lifted on 28 January 1077 after Henry's public show of penitence known as the Road to Canossa. His second excommunication by Gregory was on 7 March 1080, and the third was in 1084 or 1085. Urban II excommunicated Henry in 1088.
- Bolesław II the Generous, Duke of Poland, was excommunicated in 1080 after murdering Bishop Stanislaus of Kraków.
- King Philip I of France, first excommunicated in 1094 by Hugh of Die, Archbishop of Lyon for repudiating his marriage with Bertha of Holland and remarrying, and later reaffirmed by Pope Urban II in November 1095 at the Council of Clermont.
- The Bishop of Autun excommunicated Cluniac monks in his diocese who took over Vézelay Abbey without his permission; the excommunication was removed after they left the diocese.

=== 12th century ===
- Frederick I Barbarossa, Holy Roman Emperor, by Pope Alexander III.
- Anselm V, Archbishop of Milan, excommunicated in 1135 by Pope Honorius II.
- William I of Sicily, by Pope Adrian IV, while the king was waging war against the papal states and raiding pilgrims on their way to the tombs of the apostles.
- Ralph I, Count of Vermandois was said to have been excommunicated in 1142 by Bishop Saint Ivo of Chartres for repudiating his lawful wife and marrying another.
- Roger II of Sicily, was excommunicated under the decrees of the Second Lateran Council in 1139.
- Antipope Anacletus II
- Henry IV, Holy Roman Emperor, excommunicated by Pope Paschal II in 1106 for refusing to abjure his claim to imperial investitures, posthumously lifted in 1111. (Henry IV had already been excommunicated four times in the 11th century.)
- Henry V, Holy Roman Emperor by Jordan, Archbishop of Milan in 1116 and ratified by Pope Paschal II over the Investiture Controversy. He was excommunicated again by Pope Gelasius II and Pope Callistus II for setting up and supporting Antipope Gregory VIII. Received back into communion c. 1122.
- Mauritius Burdinus, Archbishop of Braga, was excommunicated for crowning Henry V as Holy Roman Emperor at Rome during Henry's invasion of Italy during the Investiture Controversy in 1117 by Pope Paschal II. He was excommunicated a second time in 1118 when after Paschal II died, Pope Gelasius II was elected and Henry established Archbishop Mauritius as Antipope Gregory VIII in opposition to him.
- In 1170 Archbishop of Canterbury Thomas Becket excommunicated Roger de Pont L'Évêque, the archbishop of York, along with Gilbert Foliot, the Bishop of London, and Josceline de Bohon, the Bishop of Salisbury, for crowning the heir-apparent Henry at York, thereby usurping Canterbury's privileges. In response to these excommunications, the heirs father, Henry II of England famously exclaimed words that led to Becket's assassination.

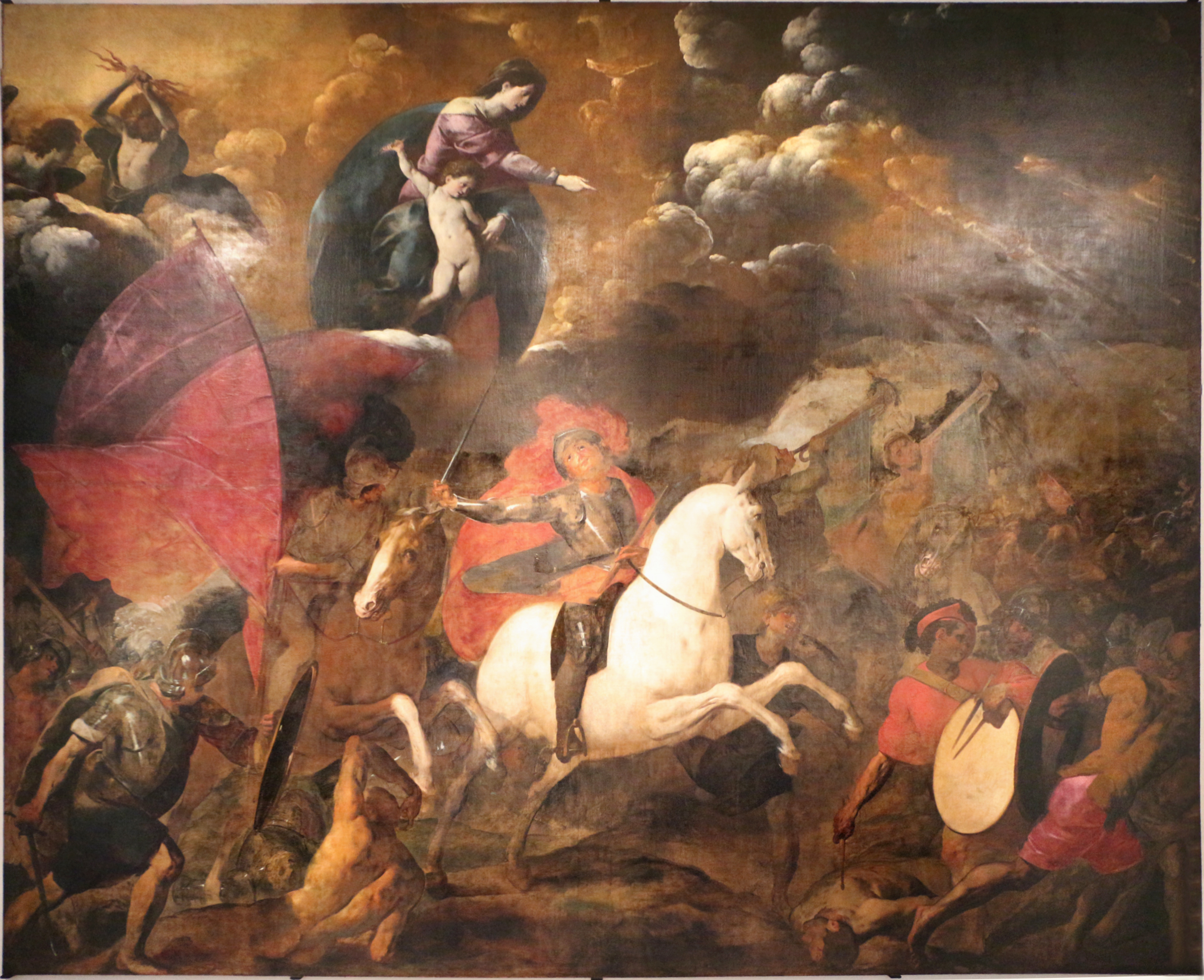
Painting of Catholic knights of the Albigensian Crusade fighting against the Cathars

- In 1171, Pope Alexander III excommunicated Reginald Fitzurse, Hugh de Morville, William de Tracy and Richard le Breton for the murder of Thomas Becket. They later did penance to the pope in Rome who ordered them to join the crusade in the Holy Land in reparation.
- The Third Council of the Lateran excommunicated the Cathars and mercenary groups that were plaguing Europe at the time.
- Duke Leopold V of Austria by Pope Celestine III.
- Markwuld of Anweiler, Imperial Seneschal in the Holy Roman Empire, was excommunicated by Pope Innocent III after he failed to return the Romagna and the March of Ancona to the Papal States.

=== 13th century ===
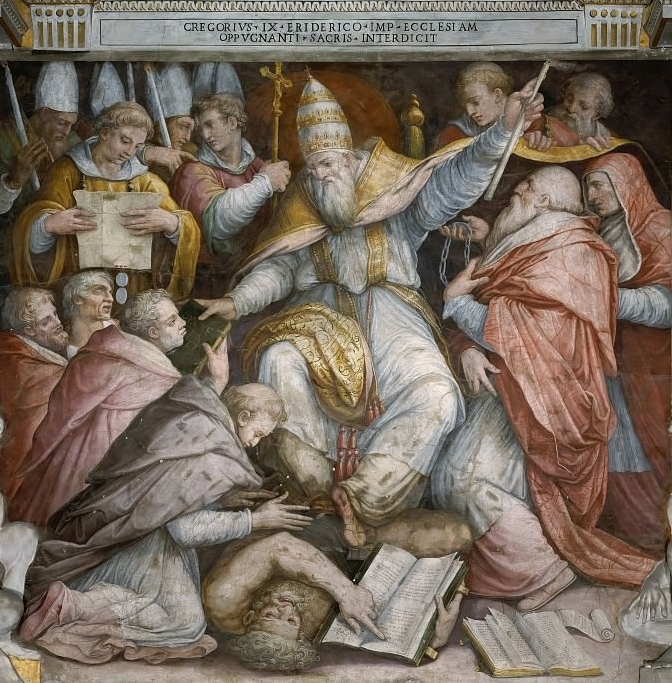
Painting of Gregory IX excommunicating Frederick II

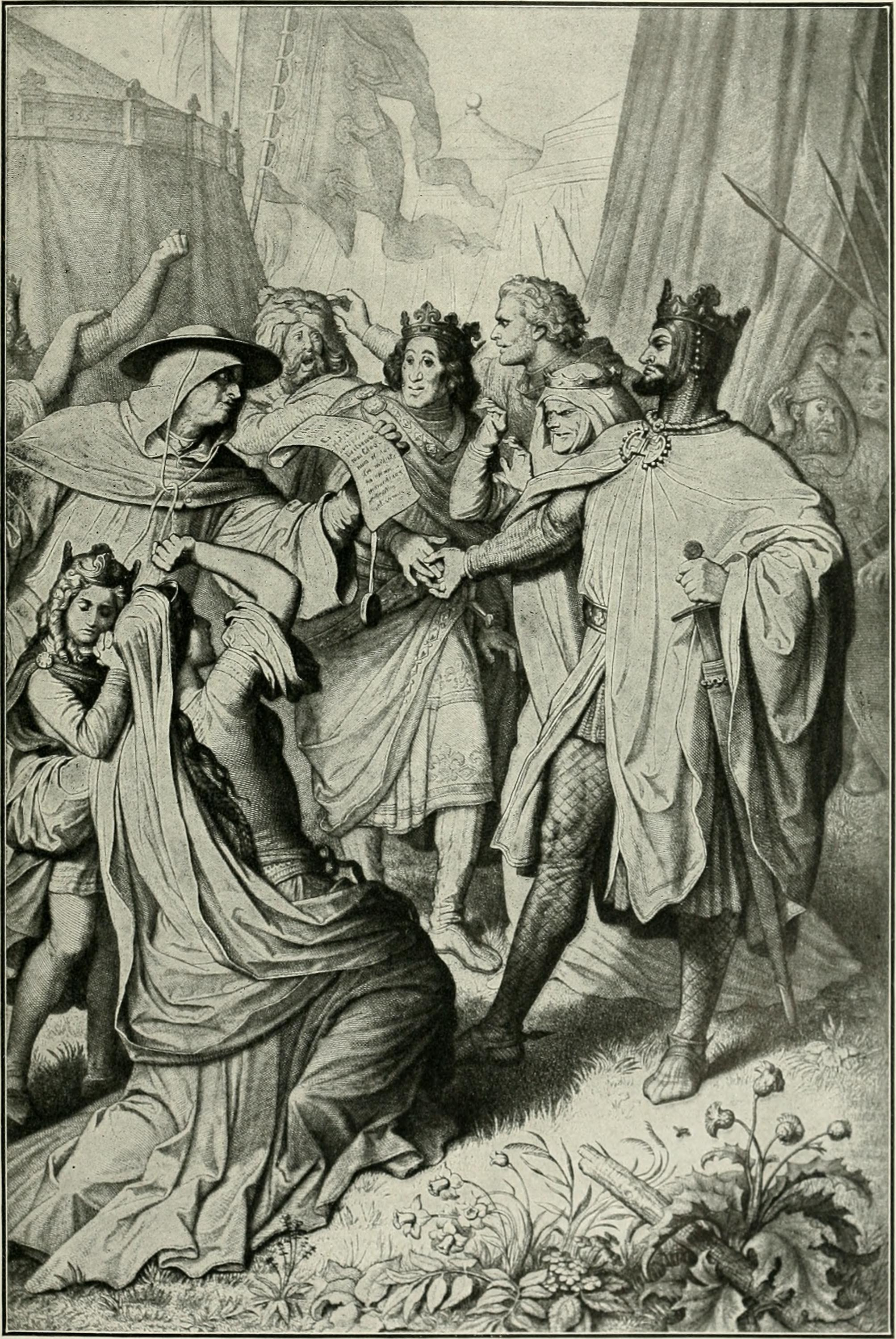
"King John Excommunicated" (from The Story of the Greatest Nations, 1913)

- King John of England, excommunicated in 1208 by Pope Innocent III after refusing to accept Cardinal Stephen Langdon as the pope's choice for Archbishop of Canterbury. John relented in 1213 and was restored to communion.
- King Afonso II of Portugal, excommunicated in 1212 by Pope Honorius III for weakening the clergy and investing part of the large sums destined to the Catholic Church in the unification of the country. Afonso II promised to reconcile with the Church, however, he died in 1223 without making any serious attempt to do so.
- Bouchard IV of Avesnes, a Hainaut nobleman and subdeacon, excommunicated in 1216 by Pope Innocent III for violating clerical celibacy by marrying Margaret II of Flanders, who was ten years old at the time. The marriage was annulled three years later.
- King Andrew II of Hungary, was excommunicated in 1231 after not following the points of Golden Bull of 1222, a seminal bill of rights, which contained new dispositions related to the tithe and hostile practices against the Jews and Muslims of the realm.
- Frederick II, Holy Roman Emperor, was excommunicated three times. The first time by Pope Gregory IX in 1227 for delaying his promise to begin the Fifth Crusade; the excommunication was lifted in 1229. The same pope excommunicated him again in 1239 for making war against the Papal States, a censure rescinded by the new pope, Celestine IV, who died soon after. Frederick was again excommunicated by Pope Innocent IV at the First Council of Lyons in 1245. Frederick repented just before his death and was absolved of the censure in 1250.
- a number of clerics and prominent lay people in the German church were excommunicated by papal legate Albert von Behaim after they had proved negligent in carrying out the needed measures to make the sentence of 1239 excommunication against Frederick II, Holy Roman Emperor effective
- Manfred, King of Sicily in 1254, for taking the regency of Conradin. He became papal vicar the same year. He was excommunicated again in 1258 after crowning himself king.
- Gilbert de Clare, 7th Earl of Gloucester was excommunicated in 1264 by Pope Clement IV for rebelling against King Henry III of England during the Second Barons' War. This was lifted in 1268.
- King Ladislaus IV of Hungary in 1279, by the pope's envoy Philip, for acting against the Catholic Church and living in a pagan way with the Cumans.
- James II of Aragon, in 1286 by Pope Boniface VIII for being crowned King of Sicily and thereby usurping a papal fief. His younger brother Frederick III of Sicily was excommunicated for the same reason in 1296.
- Jacopo Colonna and Pietro Colonna, both cardinals, were excommunicated by Pope Boniface VIII in the bull 'excelso throno' (1297) for refusing to surrender their relative Stefano Colonna (who had seized and robbed the pope's nephew) and refusing to give the pope Palestrina along with two fortresses, which threatened the pope. This excommunication was extended in the same year to Jacopo's nephews and their heirs, after the two Colonna cardinals denounced the pope's election as invalid and appealed to a general council.
- King Eric VI of Denmark in 1298, by Pope Boniface VIII, for imprisoning Archbishop of Lund, Jens Grand.
- Byzantine Emperor Michael VIII Palaiologos of Constantinople, by Pope Martin IV.
- Peter III of Aragon, by Pope Martin IV
- Raymond VI, Count of Toulouse was excommunicated by Pierre de Castelnau, legate of Pope Innocent III in 1207 for refusing to persecute Albigensians in his lands and even showing them signs of favour, such as allowing them to preach in front of him. He later did penance and joined in the crusade against the Albigensians, but was excommunicated again in 1209 when he went to Toulouse and tried to elude his obligations.
- the people of Toulouse were excommunicated by the Council of Avignon in 1209 for failing to expel the Albigensians from their city.
- Otto IV, Holy Roman Emperor was excommunicated by Pope Innocent III in 1210 after he had invaded and taken over lands belonging to the Papal States as well as invading the Kingdom of Sicily that was under the pope's suzerainty.
- Alfonso IX of León, King of Leon and Galicia, was excommunicated by Pope Innocent III for marrying a near relative.
- Venetian crusaders in the Fourth Crusade that had diverted the purpose of the crusade away from the Holy Land and ended up sacking Constantinople instead were excommunicated by Pope Innocent III
- Robert Grosseteste, Bishop of Lincoln was excommunicated by monks of Canterbury Cathedral in 1243, during a time period when there was a vacancy in the see of Canterbury.
- The First and Second Councils of Lyons excommunicated all pirates and corsairs in the Mediterranean as well as their principal helpers and supporters.
- The Fourth Lateran Council excommunicated all helpers and supporters of pirates or corsairs in the Mediterranean

=== 14th century ===
- Antipopes at Avignon Clement VII and Benedict XIII and their followers by proxy, causing the Western Schism
- Marguerite Porete, a French beguine was excommunicated and burned at the stake for heresy in 1310
- Barnabò Visconti, tyrant of Milan, by Blessed Urban V in 1363. This was later rescinded after Barnabo restored castles he had seized and peace was concluded between him and the papal states. He was again excommunicated by Pope Gregory XI after he took over Reggio and other places that were feudatory to the Holy See in 1371. Barnabo reportedly forced the papal legates who brought him the bull of excommunication to eat the parchment on which it was written.
- The inhabitants of Florence were collectively excommunicated by Pope Gregory XI after they conspired with the excommunicated Barnabò Visconti, tyrant of Milan, in 1375 to stir up the inhabitants of the Papal States against the French legates that Pope Gregory had sent to rule them in his place, since Gregory lived in Avignon. Florence sent Catherine of Siena to intercede for them with the pope and she successfully convinced the pope to leave Avignon and return to Rome.
- Mercenary bands known as the 'free companies' that had overrun Italy and France were excommunicated by Blessed Urban V in 1366. Included in this excommunication were the German Konrad von Landau and the Englishman Sir John Hawkwood.
- Pedro the Cruel was excommunicated by Pope Urban V for his persecutions of clergy and cruelty.
- King Philip the Fair of France in 1303 by Pope Boniface VIII, for failing to respond adequately to a papal letter regarding Philip's effective rejection of the pope's temporal authority.
- William of Littlington, an English Carmelite friar, in 1305; he was reconciled, after a four years' penance, in 1309.
- Ladislaus Kán, Hungarian noble regent of the region of Transylvania that was excommunicated in 1309 by the pope's envoy Gentile Portino da Montefiore for not handing over the Holy Crown of Hungary, that was being kept illegally by him.
- Matthew III Csák, Hungarian noble that was excommunicated in 1311 by the pope's envoy Gentile, for not accepting the new King Charles I of Hungary.
- Robert the Bruce, King of Scots from 1306 to 1329, was excommunicated following his killing of John Comyn before the altar of the Greyfriars Church at Dumfries in 1306. His excommunication was lifted by Pope John XXII.
- William de Lamberton, Bishop of St Andrews.
- David de Moravia, Bishop of Moray.
- Robert Wishart, Bishop of Glasgow.
- Joanna I of Naples in 1378 by Pope Urban VI for her support of Antipope Clement VII, support deemed heretical by Urban.
- All cardinals who voted for Antipope Clement VII were excommunicated by Urban VI.
- Charles III of Naples in 1385 for his alleged involvement in a plot against Urban VI.
- John Wycliffe was posthumously excommunicated by the Council of Constance.
- Angelo da Clareno and his group of Spiritual Franciscans were excommunicated by Pope John XXII in 1317.
- the Spiritual Franciscans of Tuscany were excommunicated by Pope John XXII in 1317.
- the Spiritual Franciscans of Provence were excommunicated by Guillaume d'Astre, Franciscan provincial superior.
- Louis IV, Holy Roman Emperor by Pope John XXII in 1324. Louis later marched on Rome, issued a decree that deposed the pope and installed Antipope Nicholas V.

=== 15th century ===
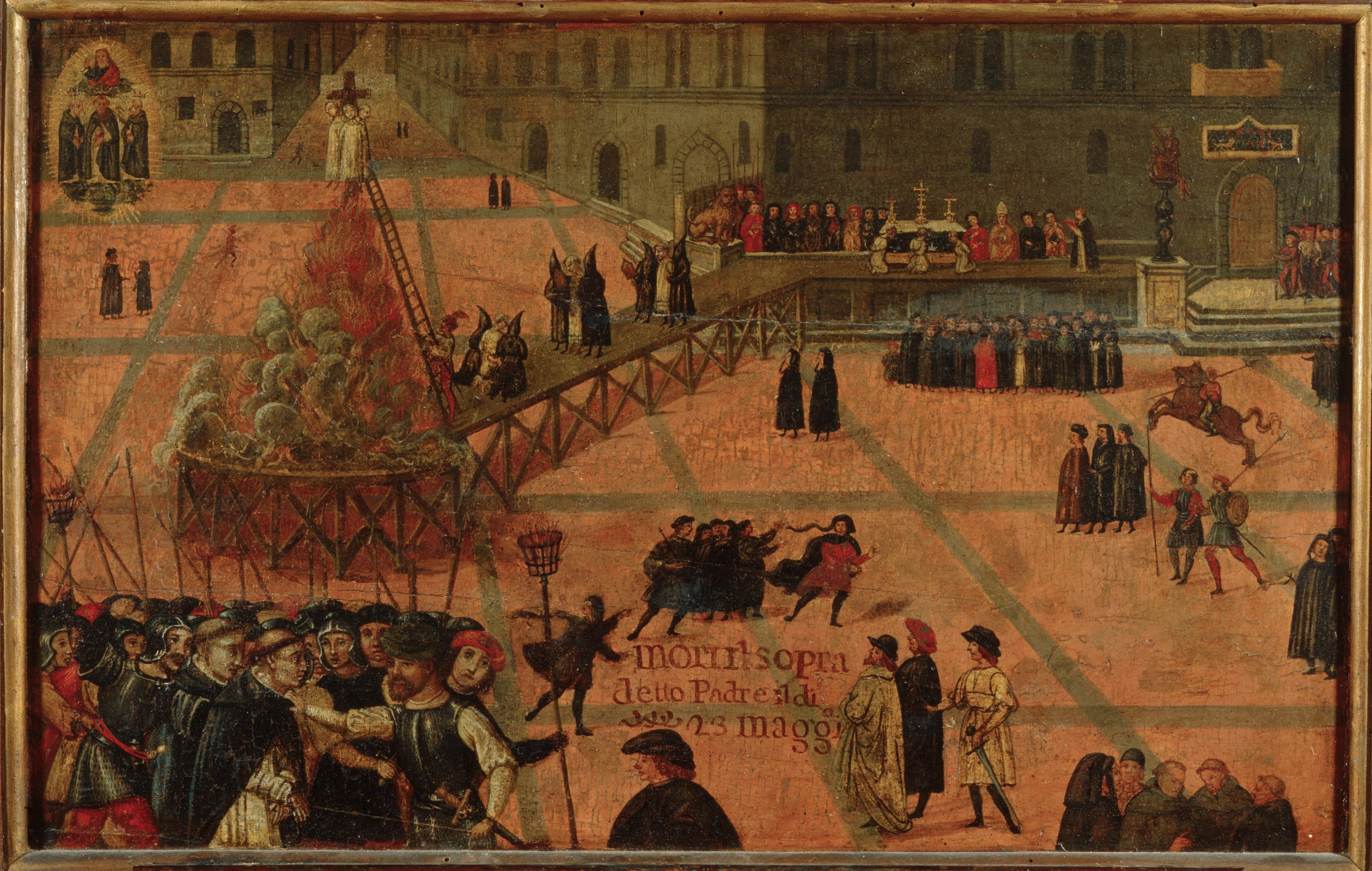
Public burning of Girolamo Savonarola and two other friars in Florence by church authorities

- Lorenzo De Medici and the city of Florence in 1478, after the papacy-backed Pazzi Conspiracy failed, for the hanging of Salviati in his vestial robes.
- Jerome of Prague in 1409 by Zbyněk Zajíc of Hazmburk, Archbishop of Prague, for his role in the Czech Wycliffe campaign.
- Future Pope Martin V in 1411 by Pope Gregory XII for supporting Pisan Antipope Alexander V and Antipope John XXIII. His excommunication was lifted in 1415 at the Council of Constance in order for Martin to become pope and end the Western Schism.
- Antipope Benedict XIII by Pope Martin V in 1415, for refusing to step down despite his promise at the Council of Constance.
- Hussites founder Jan Hus by the Council of Constance in 1415.
- Saint Joan of Arc by Bishop Pierre Cauchon of Beauvais on 30 May 1431 (even though he allowed her Holy Communion before her immolation). She was fully reconciled with the Church at her Trial of Nullification in 1456.
- Antipope Felix V and his followers by Pope Eugene IV at the Council of Florence on 23 March 1440.
- Bishop Pierre Cauchon in 1457 by Pope Callixtus III for his persecution and condemnation of Joan of Arc.
- The town of Prudnik in Silesia on 23 March 1464 by Pope Pius II for refusing to pay the debt of Duke Konrad IV the Elder.
- King George of Poděbrady of Bohemia, an Utraqist, was excommunicated by Pope Paul II on 23 December 1466. This led to a Crusade against him in the Bohemian–Hungarian War (1468–1478).
- Girolamo Savonarola in 1497 by Pope Alexander VI.

=== 16th century ===
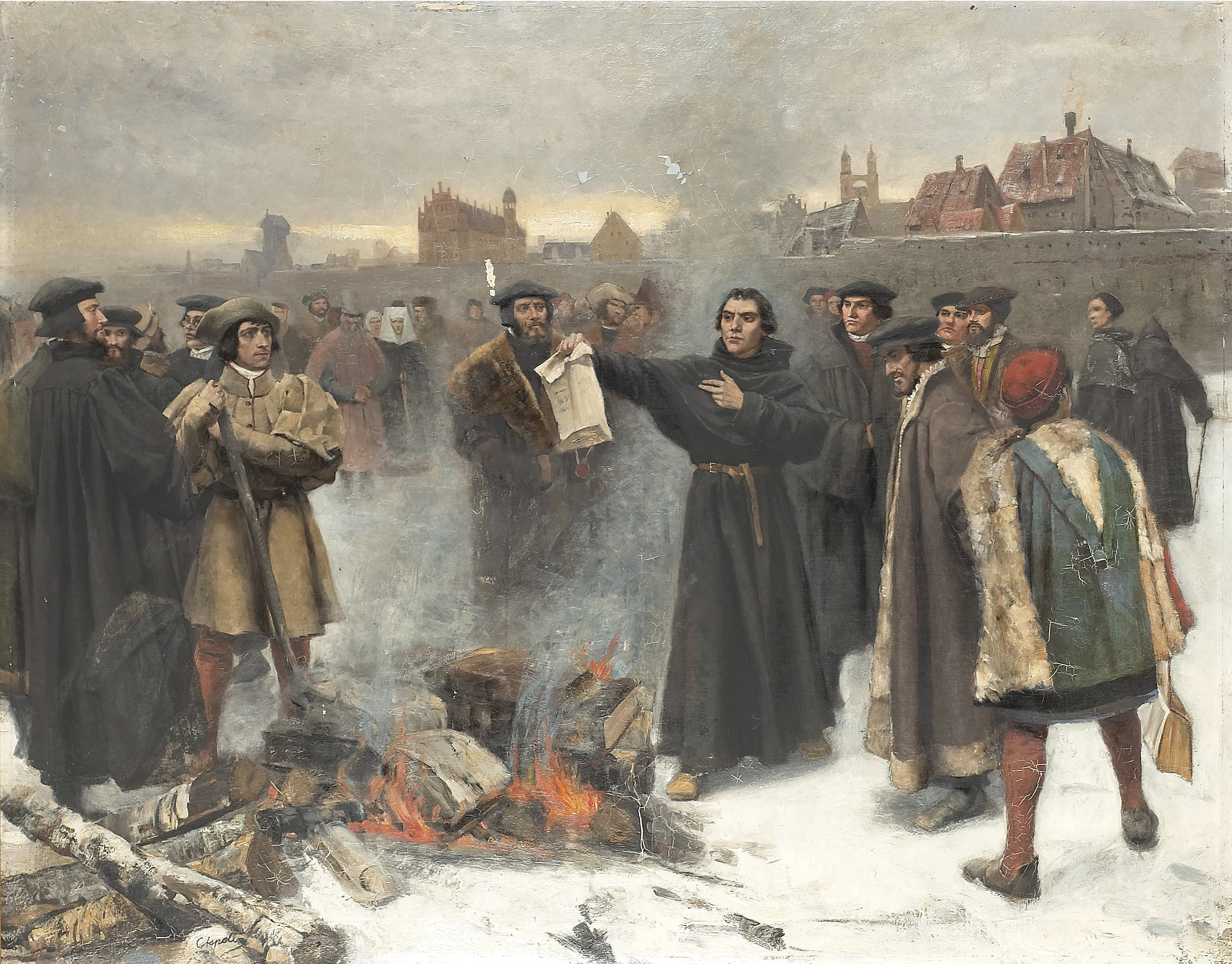
Painting of Martin Luther burning the papal bull Exsurge Domine, which condemned his teachings as heresy

- Cardinal Pietro Colonna in 1501 by Pope Alexander VI
- James IV of Scotland in 1513 for breaking the Treaty of Perpetual Peace with England.
- Martin Luther, the Protestant Reformer, in 1521 by Pope Leo X.
- Henry VIII of England in 1533, officially promulgated on 17 December 1538 by Pope Paul III.
- Thomas Cranmer, Archbishop of Canterbury and first Protestant Archbishop of Canterbury of the Church of England.
- Cardinal Odet de Coligny, on 31 March 1563, for professing Calvinism.
- Elizabeth I of England in 1570 by the papal bull Regnans in Excelsis.
- Thomas Erastus, founder of Erastianism
- Henry IV of France and Navarre, who famously retaliated by "excommunicating" the pope. He later converted to Catholicism and his excommunication was lifted on 17 September 1595.
- Giovanni Bentivoglio, leader of Bologna, in 1506 by Julius II, while the pope was at war with him and leading an army to take Bologna.
- Alfonso I d'Este, Duke of Ferrara, by Julius II in 1510.
- Discalced Carmelites in Spain who participated in an illicit meeting to elect a provincial without approval, by the pope's legate in Spain Filippo Sega in 1578 This was ignored by those excommunicated. It was formally revoked in 1579.
- Carmelite nuns of the Monastery of the Encarnacion in Ávila who refused to renounce Teresa of Ávila's leadership of the convent, by the orders provincial, after the church authorities ordered a replacement in 1577. This excommunication was revoked later that year.
- Gérard Cauvin, father of Jean Calvin, was excommunicated by the chapter of the Diocese of Noyon on account of him not sending in his accounts while he served as a procurator for the diocese.
- Giordano Bruno for heresy in 1576, he was later tried and burned to death by the Inquisition in 1600

=== 17th century ===
- Mikołaj Sapieha in approximately 1625 by Pope Urban VIII; punishment for stealing a painting. The excommunication was lifted in 1634 to allow Sapieha to publicly oppose the suggested marriage of Władysław IV Vasa and Princess Elizabeth of Bohemia.
- Odoardo Farnese, Duke of Parma in 1641 by Pope Urban VIII during the Wars of Castro. He later reconciled with the Church and was readmitted to the sacraments.
- Priests Francisco de Jaca and Epiphane de Moirans in 1681 for opposing slavery in Cuba by their local bishop, however in 1686 the Holy Office under Pope Innocent XI formally agreed with a document they co-authored, which decried the slave trade.

=== 18th century ===
- Most important supporters of Jansenism, in the 1718 bull Pastoralis officii
- Charles Maurice de Talleyrand-Périgord, Bishop of Autun, by Pope Pius VI. Before his death, Talleyrand was later reconciled with the Church.

=== 19th century ===
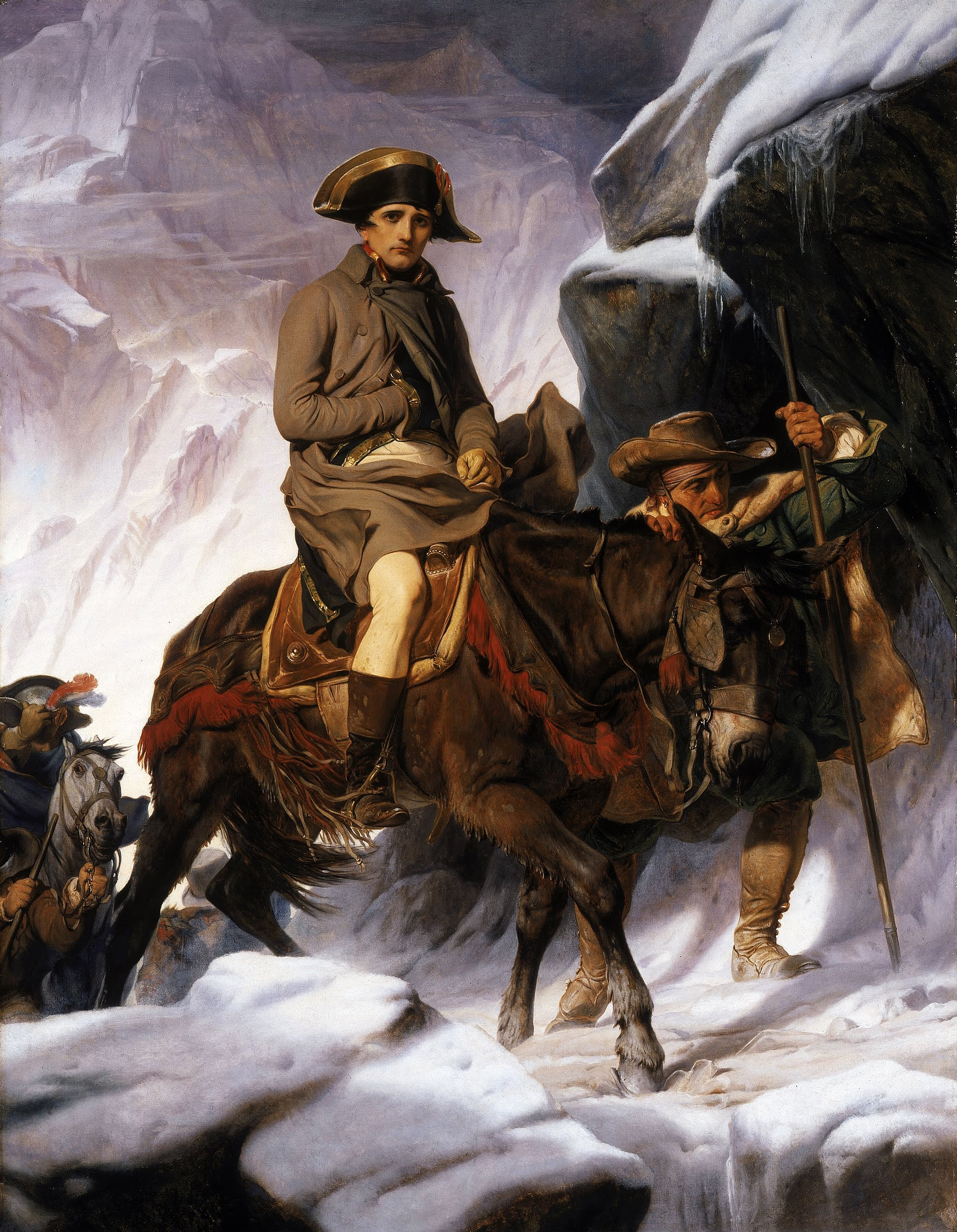
Napoleon Bonaparte was excommunicated by Pope Pius VII in 1809; Bonaparte Crossing the Alps by Paul Delaroche, 1848

- Napoleon was excommunicated in the 1809 bull Quum memoranda by Pope Pius VII for ordering the annexation of Rome and a long period of anti-Papal orders. Before Napoleon's death, his excommunication was lifted and he received the last rites.
- Fr. John Power was excommunicated by Thomas Scallan, Bishop of Newfoundland in 1820, when the former celebrated mass in Labrador after having been already suspended
- Stephen Kaminski, Bishop of the Polish National Catholic Church, in 1898
- Francis Hodur, Roman Catholic priest (Scranton, Pennsylvania) and Prime Bishop of the Polish National Catholic Church
- Gregorio Aglipay Cruz y Labayan was a Roman Catholic priest who became the first Filipino Supreme Bishop of the Philippine Independent Church, a new Protestant revolutionary-nationalist church, who would later become an Anglo-Catholic church. Excommunicated in May 1899 by Archbishop of Manila Bernardino Norzaleda y Villa upon the expressed permission of Pope Leo XIII due to "usurpation of ecclesiastical jurisdiction" during the Philippine–American War.
- Saint Mary MacKillop by Bishop Laurence Sheil in 1871. Five months later, from his deathbed, Shiel rescinded the excommunication.
- Fr. Edward McGlynn was excommunicated in 1887 for opposing the establishment of parochial schools believing that they were unnecessary. The excommunication was lifted in 1892.
- Fr. José María Morelos and Fr. Miguel Hidalgo y Costilla (both allegedly reconciled before their death) for "disturbances of the public order, corrupting the public, sacrilege [and] perjury" in 1810.
- King Victor Emmanuel II of Italy was excommunicated by Pope Pius IX when the king annexed the Papal States and captured the city of Rome, forcing the pope to take refuge in the Vatican City. Before Victor Emmanuel II's death his excommunication was lifted and the Royal Chaplain was authorized to administer the last rites. However, the king died before this could be done.
- Charles Loyson (name as a Carmelite: Hyacinthe) was excommunicated in 1869 for leaving his religious order after refusing to retract his protest against the manner of convocation of the First Vatican Council.
- Colombian writer and atheist José María Vargas Vila was excommunicated upon the publication his novel Ibis (1900).
- Scientist Dr. Gregorio Chil y Naranjo was excommunicated in 1878 for his work on evolution in the Canary Islands entitled "Estudios historicos, climatologicos y patológicos de las Islas Canarias." The Bishop of Barcelona, José María de Urquinaona y Vidot, declared the work "false, impious, scandalous, and heretical" and excommunicated the doctor.
- Ignaz von Döllinger and Johann Friedrich were excommunicated by Gregor von Scherr, Archbishop of Munich and Freising on 18 April 1871, on account of their opposition to the doctrine of papal infallibility. This was part of the events in the creation of the Old Catholic Church
- Joseph Hubert Reinkens, bishop in the Old Catholic Church, was excommunicated by Pope Pius IX on 9 November 1873
- Bernhard Josef Hilgers, Joseph Langen, Franz Heinrich Reusch and Franz Peter Knoodt, theology professors at the University of Bonn were excommunicated by Cardinal Archbishop of Cologne, Paul Melchers in 1872 on account of their opposition to the doctrine of papal infallibility

=== 20th century ===
- All Catholics who participated in the creation of the Philippine Independent Church in the Philippines, in December 1902
- Feliksa Kozłowska, Maria Michał Kowalski and the Mariavite movement in December 1906 by Pope Pius X
- Alfred Loisy, a French cleric associated with modernism, possibly in 1908
- Fr. Romolo Murri, a leader of the Italian Catholic Democrats, for giving speeches against papal policy in 1909
- Léon Degrelle, leader of the rexist party and then member of the Waffen-SS, by Mgr. André Charrue(fr), Bishop of Namur, for physically attacking a priest in 1943
- Marshal Josip Broz Tito, leader of Communist Yugoslavia, and all Catholics who participated in the trial of Archbishop Aloysius Stepinac of Zagreb and the trial of Archbishop József Mindszenty of Hungary, which included most of the jury members, in 1946
- Fr. Michel Collin of France was excommunicated in 1951 for various heresies, and later declared himself Pope Clement XV.
- Fr. Leonard Feeney, SJ on 13 February 1953 for disobedience to the Holy See. Feeney promoted Feeneyism, a view condemned by the Catholic Church. Feeney was later reconciled to communion in the church without recanting his views.
- Juan Perón in 1955 after he signed a decree ordering the expulsion of Bishops Manuel Tato and Ramón Novoa. In 1963 Perón was reconciled with the Church and his excommunication lifted.
- Anthony Tu Shihua received latae sententiae excommunication in 1959, later confirmed by the Holy See, for having receiving illicit episcopal ordination to become Bishop of Hanyang. This excommunication was later lifted shortly before his death in 2017.
- Plaquemines Parish President Leander Perez, Jackson G. Ricau (secretary of the Citizens Council of South Louisiana) and Mrs. B.J. Gaillot, Jr., president of Save Our Nation, Inc., on 16 April 1962 by Archbishop Joseph Rummel of the Archdiocese of New Orleans. They were excommunicated for aggressively opposing the racial integration of Catholic schools in the Archdiocese starting in the 1963–64 school year. Perez and Ricau were later reinstated into the Church following public retractions.
- In 1976, the Holy See confirmed the excommunication of those who participated in illicit episcopal consecrations for the Palmarian Christian Church, including former Archbishop of Huế Pierre Martin Ngô Đình Thục, brother of Ngô Đình Diệm and Ngô Đình Nhu.
- Archbishop Thục quickly repented and was received back into the Church, but in 1981 he carried out new unauthorized ordinations of bishops. For this he was excommunicated again in 1983, but repented and was again received back into the Church in 1984.
- In April 1984, Fr. Gunther Storck was excommunicated for being consecrated bishop by excommunicated Bishop Michel-Louis Guérard des Lauriers.
- Archbishop Marcel Lefebvre, Bishops Antonio de Castro Meyer, Bernard Fellay, Bernard Tissier de Mallerais, Richard Williamson and Alfonso de Galarreta for the Ecône Consecrations (Society of St. Pius X) without papal mandate. Formally declared to have incurred latae sententiae excommunication by Cardinal Bernardin Gantin on 1 July 1988. The excommunications of the latter four (the bishops consecrated in that 1988 ceremony) were lifted in 2009; the first two (the consecrator and the co-consecrator) had died in the meantime. Williamson fell under a second excommunication after illicitly ordaining a bishop.
- Members of multiple organizations in the Roman Catholic Diocese of Lincoln, Nebraska were excommunicated by Bishop Fabian Bruskewitz in March 1996 for promoting positions he deemed "totally incompatible with the Catholic faith". The organizations include Call to Action, Catholics for a Free Choice, Planned Parenthood, the Hemlock Society, the Freemasons, and the Society of St. Pius X. The Vatican later confirmed the excommunication of Call to Action members in November 2006, but in 2017, the current Bishop of Lincoln met with leadership of the group and proposed a way for individuals to be reconciled to the Church, without having to renounce their membership in the organization, as long as they reaffirmed their commitment to all of Church teaching.
- After Bishop Michael Cox consecrated Pat Buckley a bishop without papal approval, both were excommunicated.
- Isabelo de los Reyes, founder of the Philippine Independent Church, was excommunicated by Pope Leo XIII in 1903 as a schismatic apostate.
- Vincent Zhan Silu, excommunicated latae sententiae for receiving illicit episcopal consecration in 2000. His excommunication was lifted in 2018 when Pope Francis recognized all bishops in China.
- Fr. James Callan in 1999 of Rochester, New York for allowing women to offer Mass.

== 3rd Millennium ==
=== 21st century ===
- Bp. Rómulo Antonio Braschi on 5 August 2002 for having "attempted to confer priestly ordination on several Catholic women," the Danube Seven.
- Chinese bishops Joseph Liu Xinhong, Joseph Ma Yinglin, John Wu Shi-zhen and Bernardine Dong Guangqing were excommunicated by the Holy See in 2006 for engaging in illicit episcopal consecrations. The two who received ordination (Liu Xinhong and Ma Yinglin) had their excommunications lifted in 2018 when Pope Francis recognized all bishops in China.
- Zambian bishop Emmanuel Milingo was stated to be excommunicated by the Holy See in 2006 after he engaged in illicit episcopal consecrations.
- The Community of the Lady of All Nations for heretical teachings and beliefs after a six-year investigation. The declaration was announced by the Canadian Conference of Catholic Bishops on 12 September 2007.
- Fr. Basil Kovpak, traditionalist priest of Ukrainian Greek Catholic Church, was excommunicated in 2007.
- Fr. Dale Fushek (also laicized by Pope Benedict XVI in February 2010) and Fr. Mark Dippre, excommunicated by Bishop Thomas J. Olmsted for operating "an opposing ecclesial community" in direct disobedience to orders to refrain from public ministry.
- Fr. Marek Bozek (since laicized by Pope Benedict XVI), and the lay parish board members of St. Stanislaus Kostka Church in St. Louis, Missouri in December 2005 were declared guilty of the ecclesiastical crime of schism by then-Archbishop Raymond Leo Burke. Their excommunication was ratified by the Vatican in May 2008. Four of the parish board members have since reconciled with the Church.
- Rev. Fr. Alejandre Galias of the Diocese of Sorsogon was automatically excommunicated on September 21, 2007 by Bishop Arturo Bastes due to an accusation of him of breaking the seal of confession in the Sacrament of Reconciliation.
- Both the doctors and the mother of the nine-year-old victim in the 2009 Brazilian girl abortion case were said by Archbishop José Cardoso Sobrinho of Olinda and Recife to have incurred an automatic excommunication. The victim had an abortion after being raped and impregnated by her stepfather. The National Conference of Bishops of Brazil contradicted Sobrinho's statement: it declared that, in accordance with canon law, the girl's mother was not in fact excommunicated and that there were no grounds for stating that any of the doctors involved were in fact excommunicated. Disagreement with the Archbishop's view of the supposed excommunication was expressed also by other bishops.
- Sr. Margaret McBride, a nun, for allowing an abortion. McBride later reconciled with the Church and had her excommunication reversed.
- Joseph Guo Jincai (2010), Joseph Huang Bingzhang (2011), Lei Shiyin (2011), and Yue Fusheng (2012) were excommunicated by the Holy See for illicitly receiving episcopal consecration to become Bishop of Chengde, Shantou, Leshan, and Harbin respectively. Their consecrators were not formally excommunicated and the Holy See noted that it was possible they were forced to take part; however, if they were not forced, they would have also suffered an automatic excommunication. These excommunications were lifted in 2018 as part of Pope Francis' recognition of Chinese bishops.
- In October 2012, the newspapers El Observador and El País reported that all the Catholics who promoted the abortion law in Uruguay were excommunicated. Another newspaper, Urgente24, in spite of a headline stating that what it called the "abortionist lawmakers" were excommunicated, explained in the body of the article that automatic excommunication applied only to someone who directly carried out an abortion. The bishop's website also explained that excommunication would automatically apply, under Canon 1398, only to anyone carrying out an abortion, and not to lawmakers.
- Fr. Roy Bourgeois (also laicized and dismissed from the Maryknoll Fathers) for participating in the attempted ordination of a woman.
- Fr. Robert Marrone on 6 March 2013 by Bishop Richard Gerard Lennon of the Diocese of Cleveland in Cleveland, Ohio for direct disobedience to orders from the bishop regarding the terms of his leave of absence and orders to refrain from public ministry. Marrone set up "an opposing ecclesial community" (the Community of St. Peter's) in a vacant warehouse that is not a Catholic church building and is outside of the authority of the Roman Catholic Diocese of Cleveland after St. Peter's Parish in Cleveland was closed (it has since been reopened with a new pastor).
- Fr. Roberto Francisco Daniel from Bauru, Brazil was excommunicated by Bishop Caetano Ferrari because he refused a direct order from his bishop to apologize for or retract his statement that love was possible between people of the same sex. The priest also said a married person who chose to have an affair, heterosexual or otherwise, would not be unfaithful as long as that person's spouse allowed it.
- Fr. Greg Reynolds of Melbourne was excommunicated in 2013 for continuing to celebrate Mass when not permitted, advocating the attempted ordination of women, and promoting same-sex marriage.
- Fr. Jose Mercau in 2014 as part of the Catholic Church sexual abuse cases.
- According to National Catholic Reporter, Pope Francis excommunicated two founders of the 'We Are Church' movement Martha and Gert Heizer on 22 May 2014 for regularly celebrating simulated Masses in their home in Tyrol without a priest.
- Samantha Hudson, a Spanish drag artist, was excommunicated in 2015 by Bishop of Mallorca Javier Salinas Viñals for a controversial musical video about the oppression the LGBTQ+ community faces due to the Catholic Church. The video was for a school project and was produced when she was 15 years old.
- Fr. Alessandro Maria Minutella, of the Archdiocese of Palermo, was excommunicated in 2017 by his bishop Corrado Lorefice for schism. Minutella expressed Benevacantist views with his denunciation of Pope Francis as a heretic.
- In February 2018, Fr. Ezinwanne Igbo, a Nigerian priest working on the Sunshine Coast of Queensland, Australia, was excommunicated by Pope Francis for breaking confession secrecy rules after a two-year investigation.
- Pablo de Rojas Sánchez-Franco, a self-proclaimed bishop, was excommunicated in 2019 by Bishop Mario Iceta of Bilbao. He was later expelled from the convent he had been living as a bishop in following his excommunication.
- On Christmas Eve in 2019, three Scottish hermits, Fr. Stephen de Kerdrel, Sister Colette Roberts and Brother Damon Kelly, were excommunicated after accusing Pope Francis of heresy in an online statement.
- In July 2020, Tomislav Vlašić, a former director of the alleged seers of Our Lady of Medjugorje was excommunicated for holding himself out as a priest and simulating sacraments, after continuing to preach after being laicized for teaching false doctrine, manipulating consciences, disobeying ecclesiastical authority, and of committing acts of sexual misconduct.
- In August 2020, Fr. Jeremy Leatherby, a priest of the Diocese of Sacramento, incurred an automatic excommunication for schism after expressing Benevacantist views by refusing to recognize the legitimacy of Pope Francis, most notably substituting his name with that of his predecessor Pope Benedict XVI and omitting the name of Bishop Jaime Soto during the Eucharistic Prayer while offering Mass. Bishop Soto announced the excommunication on 7 August.
- Fr. Marko Ivan Rupnik, SJ in 2021 for absolution of an accomplice. His excommunication was lifted after he sought forgiveness from Pope Francis.
- Fr. Ramon Guidetti of the diocese of Livorno was excommunicated by his bishop Simone Giusti in January 2024 following a New Year's Eve homily shared online in which he denounced Pope Francis as an "anti-pope usurper", thus expressing Benevacantist views.
- Fr. Michał Woźnicki SDB on 8 September 2023 for "refusing to recognize the authority of the Roman Pontiff and not remaining in community with members of the Church who recognize his authority".
- Ten Poor Clares nuns in Belorado, Spain, were excommunicated in June 2024 by Archbishop Mario Iceta of Burgos following a property dispute with Iceta.
- On 4 July 2024, Archbishop Carlo Maria Viganò, the Vatican's former apostolic nuncio to the United States, was excommunicated for schism. The Vatican elaborated: "His public statements manifesting his refusal to recognize and submit to the Supreme Pontiff, his rejection of communion with the members of the Church subject to him, and of the legitimacy and magisterial authority of the Second Vatican Council are well known."
- On 28 January 2025, Fr. Natale Santonocito, parish priest of the San Cesareo Church in the Diocese of Tivoli was excommunicated for schism by Monsignor Mauro Parmeggiani, Bishop of Tivoli. He expressed Benevacantist views by claiming that Pope Benedict XVI had never resigned and Pope Francis was thus an illegitimate anti-pope, saying "Bergoglio is not the legitimate Pope and never has been".
- Scott E. Peyton, former permanent deacon of the Diocese of Lafayette, Louisiana, was declared to have incurred a latae sententiae excommunication by Bishop J. Douglas Deshotel on 13 March 2024, after formally resigning from the diaconate, leaving the Catholic Church and joining an Anglican congregation.
- Anthony Ward of Colorado was excommunicated on November 10, 2025 for being ordained to the episcopacy by Archbishop Telesphore George Mpundu, the retired Archbishop of Lusaka, Zambia, without papal mandate.
- Bishops Bernard Fellay and Alfonso de Galarreta consecrated Pascal Schreiber, Michael Goldade, Michel Poinsinet de Sivry, and Marc Hanappier as bishops for the Society of Saint Pius X at Écône on 1 July 2026; the consecrations resulted in ipso facto excommunication for all six due to lack of papal mandate. The Dicastery for the Doctrine of the Faith announced the excommunication of the six on 2 July 2026, declaring all ministers of the SSPX as schismatics, including the lay faithful who formally adhere to the SSPX.
- Michael Mary and the traditionalist Sons of the Holy Redeemer by the bishop of Aberdeen in July 2026 for an illicit consecration
- Fr. John Mary Foster was announced to have incurred latae sententiae excommunication and dismissal from the clerical state by Archbishop Gustavo García-Siller on August 14, 2026 after being found guilty of the ecclesial crime of schism; as founder of the Mission of Divine Mercy, Foster expressed Sedevacantist and Benevacantist views and relayed messages that Pope Benedict XVI had never resigned and that Popes Francis and Leo XIV were "usurpers" and that Leo was "not a true pope."

== See also ==
- List of cardinals excommunicated by the Catholic Church
- Shunning in religion
- List of excommunicable offences in the Catholic Church
- List of people executed in the Papal States
- Papal deposing power
