= Sexual abuse scandal in the Roman Catholic Diocese of Phoenix =

The sexual abuse scandal in the Roman Catholic Diocese of Phoenix encompassed allegations of sexual assault against numerous members of the clergy as well as determinations that diocesan leadership covered up these crimes by transferring priests to different parishes. The Diocese of Phoenix includes the City of Phoenix and the counties in Central and Northern Arizona.

A grand jury investigation in 2002 forced the diocese to enact reforms on the setting and implementation of sexual abuse policies. To avoid criminal indicted, Bishop Thomas J. O'Brien admitted to allowing priests with accusations of sexual abuse to be transferred where they could abuse more children.

Six priests in the diocese were convicted of sexual abuse crimes. Their sentences ranged from 22 months to 111 years in prison for crimes including indecent exposure, sexual assault and child molestation. Their victims ranged in age from 13 to 17. They were assaulted in a rectory, one boy's home, a camping trip and a trip to Rome.

== Grand jury investigation ==
In 2002, Maricopa County district attorney Rick Romley launched a grand jury investigation into cases of sexual abuse of minors by priests and the handling of those accusations by the Diocese of Phoenix leadership. As part of this investigation, Romley reached an agreement with O'Brien:

- O'Brien would appoint a moderator of the curia, a priest with total responsibility for the sexual abuse policy of the diocese
- O'Brien would appoint a youth protection advocate with total responsibility for enforcing these policies
- All diocesan personnel would follow state laws on reporting sexual abuse allegations.
- O'Brien agreed to create a fund to pay for counseling and treatment of those sexually assaulted by priests during his tenure.

As part of this agreement, O'Brien admitted to have "allowed priests under his supervision to have contact with minors after becoming aware of allegations of criminal sexual misconduct" and acknowledging "transferring offending priests to situations where children could be further victimized." In return for this admission, the State of Arizona agreed to forego prosecuting O'Brien for any possible crimes related to this admission.

On February 25, 2020, Revered Thomas Spaulding, who was accused of sexually abusing at least two boys in Maricopa County, died awaiting trial. Spaulding, who was 75 years old when he died, was charged in January 2020 with six counts of sexual misconduct and one charge of child molestatation.

== Sexual abuse convictions ==
=== Reverend Joseph Briceno ===
In 1992, a teenage boy's family reported that their son had been sexually assaulted between 1980 and 198 by Briceno, then an assistant pastor at St. Mary's Parish in Chandler. They allowed the boy to have sleepovers at the rectory, when Briceno assaulted him. After the diocese suspended Briceno from ministry that year, he went to Mexicali, Mexico, to serve in a parish there. When the diocese asked him to return to Arizona, he refused. In June 2003, Briceno was indicted by the Maricopa District Attorney on one count of sexual abuse, six counts of sexual conduct with a minor and one count of attempted sexual conduct with a minor.

In December 2005, Briceno was arrested by Mexican authorities and flown back to the United States. He pleaded guilty in October 2006 to two felony counts of sexual conduct with a minor. He was sentenced in December 2006 to two years in prison and three years on probation. However, since he had already served one year in prison, his actual prison time would be 90 days.

=== Monsignor Dale Fushek ===
In May 2002, Fushek disclosed that in 1995 the diocese had settled a sexual harassment lawsuit filed against him by a former Life Teen staff member. In April 2004, Bishop Thomas Olmsted accepted Fushek's resignation from his position as vicar general. In late December 2004, additional complaints against Fushek emerged and the diocese began to conduct an investigation. Fushek was placed on paid administrative leave shortly thereafter.

Fushek was arrested on November 21, 2005, and charged with ten criminal misdemeanor counts related to alleged sexual contact with teens and young adults. The charges included three counts of misdemeanor assault, five of contributing to the delinquency of a minor and two of indecent exposure. The number of counts was reduced to seven when one of the victims died. On April 15, 2010, Fushek pled guilty to one count of misdemeanor assault. He was sentenced to 364 days of probation and fined $250. Four other charges were dropped. The plea agreement eliminated the need for other alleged victims to testify at a trial.

=== Reverend John Maurice Giandelone ===
In 1979, Benjamin Kulina and his parents met with Bishop James Rausch to complain about Giandelone, then assigned to St. Joseph's Parish in Phoenix. They told Rausch that Giandelone had sexually abused Benjamin several times in Chandler and on a camping trip. Rausch referred the family to Monsignor Thomas O'Brien, then the vicar general of the diocese. O'Brien advised the Kulinas to not say anything about it and let the diocese handle him. The diocese sent Giandelone to the Servants of the Paraclete treatment center in Jemez Springs, New Mexico, and then assigned him to St. Mary's Parish in Chandler

In 1984, Giandelone was a friend of Lillian and Al Jones, along with their 15-year-old son Fred, parishioners at St. Mary's. While Giandelone was visiting their home one evening, Al discovered him having oral sex with Fred. Fred then admitted to his parents that the priest had been abusing him for the past two years. The Jones family called the Chandler Police Department. In 1985, Giandelone pleaded guilty to attempted child molesting and was sentenced to one year in jail. However, a work release program allowed him to continue working days in the diocese. Diocesan records later showed that Giandelone had abused another teenage boy in 1980 and the diocese had sent him away for treatment.

In December 2002, Benjamin Kulina spoke with prosecutors about his sexual abuse by Giandelone. He had left the priesthood in the later 1980s and was now living in Fort Myers, Florida. He was charged that month with charged with three counts of sexual misconduct. Giandelone pleaded guilty in January 2003 to two counts of child molestation and was sentenced to between nine and 22 months in prison.

=== Reverend Joseph John Henn ===
A lawsuit was filed against the diocese in June 2003 by a young man who claimed to have been sexually abused by Henn, a Salvatorian priest. The plaintiff claimed that Henri, then serving at St. Mark Parish in East Phoenix, started abusing him when he was a 12-year-old altar in 1976; the abuse lasted for three years. In 1983, the diocese learned of Henn's relationship with the victim as well as his abuse of a second boy, who committed suicide. The Salvatorians then assigned Henn to a girls' school in the Diocese of Sacramento. The Salvatorians would treat Henn three times for his attraction to boys; they expelled him from the order in 2006.

In August 2003, Henn was indicted on sexually abusing three boys in the 1970s at the church rectory and in a swimming pool. Stationioned in Rome at this time, Henn declared his innocent and fought extradition to the United States. The Supreme Court of Cassation in Italy ordered his extradition in July 2006, but he escaped house arrest with the Salvatorians. In May 2019, Italian police arrested Henn in Rome; he was sent back to Arizona in June. Several of Henn's victims sued the diocese in 2020. He pleaded guilty in 2021 to six counts of sexual conduct with a minor and one count of attempt to commit molestation of a child.

=== Reverend Paul LeBrun ===
In September 2002, several Indiana men accused LeBrun, a former priest, of having sexually abused them as boys during the late 1980s and early 1990s. LeBrun, a member of the Congregation of Holy Cross, was a pastor at Little Flower Parish in South Bend, Indiana from 1983 to 1986 and from 1993 to 1999. During the 1980s, the boys were assaulted during a trips to Fort Myers, Florida and other locations. Aware of accusations against him, the Congregation moved LeBrun to the Diocese of Phoenix in 1987. Since the alleged crimes were past the Indiana statute of limitations, LeBrun could not be prosecuted in that state. When the LeBrun story was published in Phoenix, the Diocese of Phoenix began investigating LeBrun's tenure at three Arizona parishes.

LeBrun was indicted by the Maricopa District Attorney in Arizona in May 2003 on one count of child abuse. He was arrested by the Indiana State Police that month for extradition to Florida. More charges were added in July. In November 2005, LeBrun was convicted of three counts of sexual misconduct with a minor and three counts of child molestation. His victims from Indiana testified during the trial. He was sentenced to 111 years in state prison in January 2006.

=== Reverend Karl LeClaire ===
In 2001, a young man reported to the diocese that he had been sexually abused by LeClaire over a seven-period, starting when the victim was 13-years-old in 1993. LeClaire was the pastor at Queen of Peace Parish in Mesa and principal of the parish school. During that period, LeClaire took the boy to Rome and Puerto Rico and gave him expensive gifts. The victim sued the diocese in August 2002, claiming that the diocese was aware of LeClaire's pedophilia, but kept him in ministry. In June 2003, LeClaire was indicted on charges of child molestation and sexual conduct with a minor. LeClaire pleaded guilty in October 2004 to one count of aggravated assault with sexual motivation. He was sentenced to one year in jail and three years of probation. The diocese settled the lawsuit with LeClaire's victim for $40,000 in 2006.

== Prominent sexual abuse lawsuits ==
=== Reverend Mark Lehman ===
In December 2006 the diocese agreed to pay $100,000 to William Cesolini who claimed he was sexually assaulted as a teenager by a priest, Mark Lehman, and a former teen minister, Phil Baniewicz, at a Mesa church. Fushek, who was pastor of that parish, was accused in the suit of giving alcohol to the teen and then watching Lehman sexually abuse Cesolini.

=== Bishop Thomas O'Brien ===
In September 2016, a man file a lawsuit against the diocese, claiming that O'Brien, when a priest, sexually molested him on several occasions at parishes in Phoenix and Goodyear from 1977 to 1982. The alleged victim said they were repressed memories that he recalled only recently. O'Brien, retired as bishop, denied the charges and the diocese said he was never assigned to the parishes mentioned in the lawsuit. A judge dismissed some of the charges later that month. O'Brien died on August 26, 2018, following complications from Parkinson's Disease.

== See also ==
- Charter for the Protection of Children and Young People
- Essential Norms
- National Review Board
- Pontifical Commission for the Protection of Minors
