= Abortion in Arizona =

2024 Arizona Proposition 139 results map by county

Abortion in Arizona is legal up to the point of fetal viability (as early as six months), as a result of Arizona Proposition 139 being put into the Arizona state constitution. Arizona and New Mexico are the southernmost continental states where abortion remains broadly legal.

Abortion and religion have intersected in the state, particularly in the case of Sr. Margaret Mary McBride, R.S.M., a Sister of Mercy.

In a 2014 poll by Pew Research Center, 49% of Arizona adults said that abortion should be legal in all or most cases, with 47% saying it should be illegal in all or most cases. In a 2022 poll of 938 registered Arizona voters by OH Predictive Insights, 87% said they wanted abortion to remain legal in all or some cases.

== History ==
=== Territorial origins ===
Arizona's first ban on abortion was passed as part of the 1864 Howell Code, a year after the formation of the Arizona Territory (Arizona would not become a state until 1912). It read:

“[E]very person who shall administer or cause to be administered or taken, any medicinal substances, or shall use or cause to be used any instruments whatever, with the intention to procure the miscarriage of any woman then being with child, and shall be thereof duly convicted, shall be punished by imprisonment in the Territorial prison for a term not less than two years nor more than five years: Provided, that no physician shall be affected by the last clause of this section, who in the discharge of his professional duties, deems it necessary to produce the miscarriage of any woman in order to save her life.”

Physicians, however, were arrested for performing abortions.

In the 19th century, bans by state legislatures on abortion were about protecting the life of the mother, given the number of deaths caused by abortions; state governments saw themselves as looking out for the lives of their citizens. By 1950, the state legislature would pass a law stating that a woman who had an abortion, or actively sought to have an abortion, regardless of whether she went through with it, were guilty of a criminal offense. By 1950, abortion was a criminal offense in Arizona.

=== Roe v. Wade ===
The US Supreme Court's decision in 1973's Roe v. Wade ruling meant the state could no longer regulate abortion in the first trimester. Despite the U.S. Ninth Circuit Court of Appeals overturning Arizona's April 2012 abortion law in January 2015, the law banning abortion remains on the books.

By 1973, when Roe v. Wade was decided, Arizona's abortion law A.R.S. § 13-3603 fully banned all abortions with prison time:

A person who provides, supplies, or administers to a pregnant woman, or procures such woman to take any medicine, drugs, or substance, or uses or employs any instrument or other means whatever, with intent thereby to procure the miscarriage of such woman, unless it is necessary to save her life, shall be punished by imprisonment in the state prison for not less than two years nor more than five years.

§ 13-3603 was declared unconstitutional in 1973, in Nelson v. Planned Parenthood. The case was initially heard in 1972, when it declared the law constitutional. Only the decision in Roe changed the court's decision, in a brief rehearing in 1973. But the Arizona legislature never struck the law from the books.

As part of the statutes around abortion clinic regulations in Arizona and Florida that existed in 2007, there is a requirement that abortion providers show women ultrasounds of their fetus before they are allowed to have an abortion. Governor Jan Brewer signed into law in April 2012 abortion restrictions that prohibited the procedure after 20 weeks. In April 2012, abortion after 20 weeks of pregnancy became illegal in Arizona; however, enforcement of the ban was permanently blocked under an injunction. Targeted Regulation of Abortion Providers (TRAP) existed by 2013. In 2013, state TRAP law applied to medication-induced abortions and private doctor offices. In 2018, the state legislature passed a law that required the Arizona Health Department to apply for Title X funds as part of their attempts to defund Planned Parenthood.

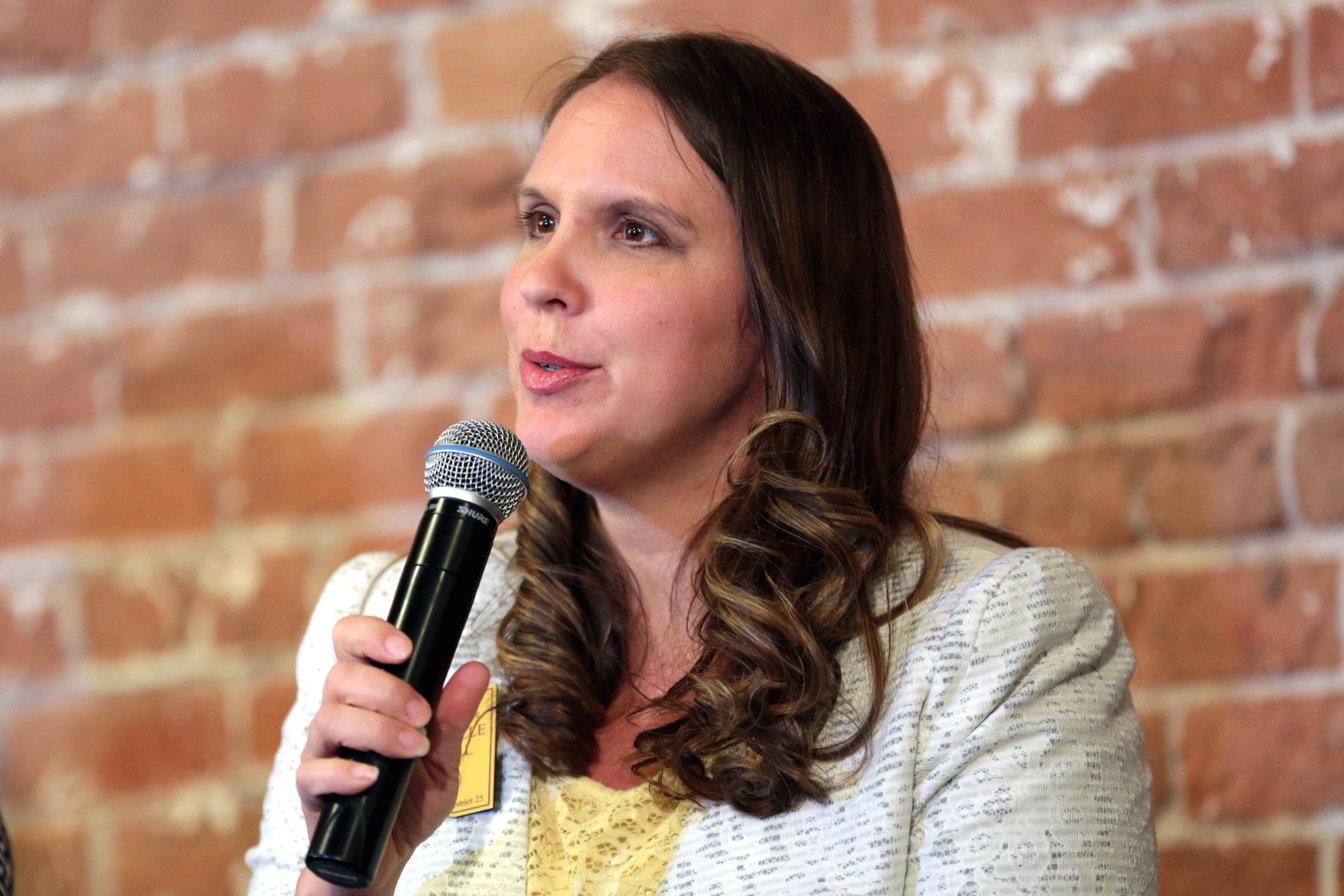
Michelle Udall, Republican Representative who introduced HB 2759

Arizona law requires that only medical doctors can perform abortions, as of 2019. Women have a mandated 24-hour waiting period after seeking an abortion, and must undergo in-person state-mandated counseling. On January 1, 2019, a new law came into force in Arizona that required women to provide detailed medical information that was to be submitted to the state before they were allowed to have an abortion. Among the information the new law required abortion providers to collect was whether the abortion was elective or therapeutic, the number of abortions they have had in the past and information on any medical complications they have as a result of the abortion. This information is then collected by Department of Health Services, which provides the state with an annual report on abortions in the state, along with information on how the abortions are paid for in the state. In 2019, women in Arizona were eligible for pregnancy-related disability-associated medical care that included abortion or miscarriage.

As of May 14, 2019, abortion was legally not allowed after the fetus was viable, generally some point between week 24 and 28. This period uses a standard defined by the US Supreme Court in 1973 with the Roe v. Wade ruling, and not state law. On May 21, 2019, HB 2759 was introduced by Republican Representative Michelle Udall in Arizona's House with 20 other co-sponsors, to provide $2.5 million annually for a period of three years to create a pilot program run by Texas anti-abortion organization Human Coalition, with a purpose "to encourage healthy childbirth [and] support childbirth as an alternative to abortion". The proposed legislation also said funds for this program "may not be used for abortion referral services or distributed to entities that promote, refer for, or perform abortions".

=== Post-Dobbs ===
In June 2022, the Dobbs v. Jackson Women's Health Organization decision overturned Roe. The passing of Senate Bill 1164 in March 2022, combined with the overturning of Roe, restricted abortions to before 15 weeks of pregnancy. S.B. 1164 went into effect 90 days after the legislative session ended on June 30. But S.B. 1164 was found not to control abortion in its entirety given that § 13-3603, which bans abortion entirely, is still on the books. These "dueling" laws led to a legal challenge.

The injunction, which was lifted on September 23, 2022, by Pima County Superior Court Judge Kellie L. Johnson, was temporarily reinstated by the Arizona Court of Appeals on October 7, 2022. On December 30, 2022, the Arizona Court of Appeals ruled that the criminal penalties of the 1864 law could not be enforced.

On April 9, 2024, the Arizona Supreme Court ruled in Planned Parenthood Arizona v. Mayes that the 1864 law could be enforced, to take effect 14 days later, but with no retroactive enforcement. As a result, abortion in Arizona temporarily became de jure illegal, except for when it is "necessary to save" the life of the pregnant woman. There were no exceptions for rape or incest, and the legally prescribed sentence for assisting in an illegal abortion is 2–5 years in prison. On April 26, 2024, the Arizona Supreme Court tersely rejected the Arizona Attorney General's motion for them to reconsider their decision.

Arizona Attorney General Kris Mayes, a Democrat, responded to the Arizona Supreme Court decision by declaring that "as long as I am Attorney General, no woman or doctor will be prosecuted under this draconian law in this state". Mayes criticized the Arizona Supreme Court for having "risked the health and lives of Arizonans", after "effectively striking down a law passed this century and replacing it with one from 160 years ago ... when Arizona wasn't a state, the Civil War was raging, and women couldn't even vote". Mayes later noted that another legal case in the Arizona Superior Court had delayed allowing enforcement of the 1864 law to be able to begin on June 8, 2024.

In the Arizona House of Representatives, Republican Representatives blocked attempts to repeal the 1864 law on April 10 and April 17, but later, on April 24, three Republican representatives sided with all the Democratic representatives in passing a repeal of the 1864 law, 32–28. In the Arizona Senate, Republican senators blocked a repeal attempt on April 10, but later, on May 1, two Republican senators joined all Democratic senators in passing a repeal of the 1864 law by a 16–14 vote. On May 2, 2024, Arizona Governor Katie Hobbs signed the bill to repeal the 1864 ban.

In May 2024, the Arizona Supreme Court accepted Attorney General Mayes' request to further stay the 1864 abortion law, as they stayed enforcement of the 1864 abortion law until August 12, 2024. Mayes responded that the stay applied in the other legal case would result in another delay of enforcement to September 26, 2024. The repeal took effect 90 days after the legislative session ends, on September 14, 2024.

==== November 2024 ballot proposal ====
In April 2024, media outlet KJZZ published a document made by a lawyer for Arizona House Republicans, which detailed plans to defeat the citizens' ballot proposal on abortion; this document was confirmed to be legitimate by Arizona House Speaker Ben Toma, a Republican, who described the document as "ideas drafted for internal discussion and consideration within the caucus".

- The first proposed Republican strategy was to offer a constitutional amendment to voters that "does not create a right to abortion", but, instead, protects the Arizona legislature's authority to "enact laws rationally related to promoting and preserving life and to protecting the health and safety of pregnant women", so that courts would have to consider the legislature's products "when interpreting the constitutional right to abortion". The proposed names for this Republican amendment were "Protecting Pregnant Women and Safe Abortions Act", the "Arizona Abortion and Reproductive Care Act", and the "Arizona Abortion Protection Act".
- The second proposed Republican strategy was named as "SEND VOTERS TWO OTHER OPTIONS THAT CONFLICT WITH AAA INITIATIVE" (the ballot proposal by Arizona for Abortion Access); the strategy presents a "15-week Reproductive Care and Abortion Act and Heartbeat Protection Act", which the document admits is "a 14-week law disguised as a 15-week law because it would only allow abortion until the beginning of the 15th week". The strategy for providing this option was because it "could potentially pull votes from AAA Initiative", and make it increasingly "likely that the AAA Initiative will fail if vote is split (dilutes vote)". The second strategy also highlights that "Voters would read [the] Legislature's referral first on the ballot" if the Arizona legislature's proposal is given to the Arizona Secretary of State before the Arizona for Abortion Access ballot proposal is officially submitted.

Arizona for Abortion Access, a campaign intending to introduce a November 2024 ballot proposal to protect abortion rights within the Arizona Constitution, gathered signatures up to July 2024 for their petition to introduce the amendment. On July 3, 2024, it was reported that the organizers working on getting signatures to get the initiative on the ballot submitted 823,685 signatures for the measure. The required amount to qualify is 383,923 signatures. Given the organizers exceeded the requirement by quite a bit, it is more likely to have qualified, barring future issues.

On November 5, 2024, 2024 Arizona Proposition 139 was approved by voters. It established a right to abortion in the Constitution of Arizona up until fetal viability, which was re-affirmed by an Arizona court in March 2025.

== Clinic history ==
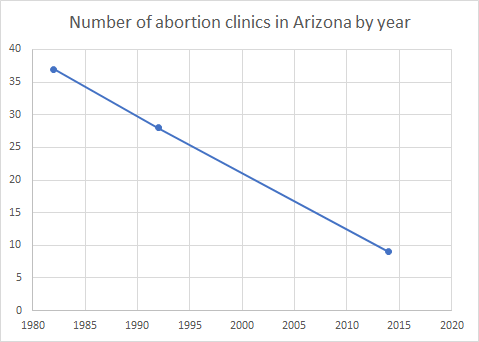
Number of abortion clinics in Arizona by year

Between 1982 and 1992, the number of abortion clinics in the state decreased by 9, going from 37 in 1982 to 28 in 1992. In 2014, there were 9 abortion clinics in the state. 80% of the counties in the state did not have an abortion clinic. That year, 19% of women in the state aged 15–44 lived in a county without an abortion clinic. In March 2016, there was only one Planned Parenthood clinic in the state. In 2017, there were 10 Planned Parenthood clinics, of which 4 offered abortion services, in a state with a population of 1,525,996 women aged 15–49. In 2019, 80% of counties in the state still did not have an abortion clinic.

== Statistics ==
In the period between 1972 and 1974, there were zero recorded illegal abortion deaths in the state. In 1990, 448,000 women in the state faced the risk of an unintended pregnancy. In 2001, Arizona, Florida, Iowa, Louisiana, Massachusetts, and Wisconsin did not provide any residence related data regarding abortions performed in the state to the Centers for Disease Control. In 2014, 49% of adults said in a poll by the Pew Research Center that abortion should be legal in all or most cases, and 47% said it should be illegal in all or most cases. In 2017, the state had an infant mortality rate of 5.7 deaths per 1,000 live births.

Number of reported abortions, abortion rate and percentage change in rate by geographic region and state in 1992, 1995 and 1996
Census division and state	Number			Rate			% change 1992–1996
Census division and state	1992	1995	1996	1992	1995	1996	% change 1992–1996
US Total	1,528,930	1,363,690	1,365,730	25.9	22.9	22.9	–12
Mountain	69,600	63,390	67,020	21	17.9	18.6	–12
Arizona	20,600	18,120	19,310	24.1	19.1	19.8	–18
Colorado	19,880	15,690	18,310	23.6	18	20.9	–12
Idaho	1,710	1,500	1,600	7.2	5.8	6.1	–15
Montana	3,300	3,010	2,900	18.2	16.2	15.6	–14
Nevada	13,300	15,600	15,450	44.2	46.7	44.6	1
New Mexico	6,410	5,450	5,470	17.7	14.4	14.4	–19
Utah	3,940	3,740	3,700	9.3	8.1	7.8	–16
Wyoming	460	280	280	4.3	2.7	2.7	–37

Number, rate, and ratio of reported abortions, by reporting area of residence and occurrence and by percentage of abortions obtained by out-of-state residents, US CDC estimates
Location	Residence			Occurrence			% obtained by out-of-state residents	Year	Ref
Location	No.	Rate^	Ratio^^	No.	Rate^	Ratio^^	% obtained by out-of-state residents	Year	Ref
Arizona				20,600	24.1			1992	
Arizona				18,120	19.1			1995	
Arizona				19,310	19.8			1996	
Arizona	12,914	9.9	149	12,900	9.9	148	1.2	2014	
Arizona	12,644	9.6	148	12,655	9.6	148	1.4	2015	
Arizona	13,358	10.0	158	13,332	10.0	158	0.6	2016	
^number of abortions per 1,000 women aged 15–44; ^^number of abortions per 1,000 live births

== Abortion financing ==
17 states including Arizona use their own funds to cover all or most "medically necessary" abortions sought by low-income women under Medicaid, 13 of which are required by State court orders to do so. In 2010, the state had fourteen publicly funded abortions, of which one was federally and thirteen were state funded. In March 2019, Arizona Family Health Partnership was the primary association to receive the state's Title X funds. Planned Parenthood received around 17% of these funds while serving around 53% of all Title IX recipients.

== Intersections with religion ==
Margaret Mary McBride is a Sister of Mercy. McBride was an administrator and member of the ethics committee at St. Joseph's Hospital and Medical Center, which is owned by Catholic Healthcare West (Dignity Health). On November 27, 2009, the committee was consulted on the case of a 27-year-old woman who was eleven weeks pregnant with her fifth child and suffering from pulmonary hypertension. Her doctors stated that the woman's chance of dying if the pregnancy was allowed to continue was "close to 100 percent". McBride joined the ethics committee in approving the decision to terminate the pregnancy through an induced abortion. The abortion took place and the mother survived.

Afterwards, the abortion came to the attention of Bishop Thomas J. Olmsted, the bishop of the Catholic Diocese of Phoenix. Olmsted spoke to McBride privately and she confirmed her participation in the procurement of the abortion. Olmsted informed her that in allowing the abortion, she had incurred a latae sententiae, or automatic, excommunication. McBride was subsequently reassigned from her post as vice president of mission integration at the hospital.

In December 2010, Olmsted announced that the Roman Catholic Diocese of Phoenix was severing its affiliation with the hospital, after months of discussion had failed to obtain from the hospital management a promise not to perform abortions in the future. "If we are presented with a situation in which a pregnancy threatens a woman's life, our first priority is to save both patients. If that is not possible, we will always save the life we can save, and that is what we did in this case," said hospital president Linda Hunt. "Morally, ethically, and legally, we simply cannot stand by and let someone die whose life we might be able to save."

== Abortion rights activities ==
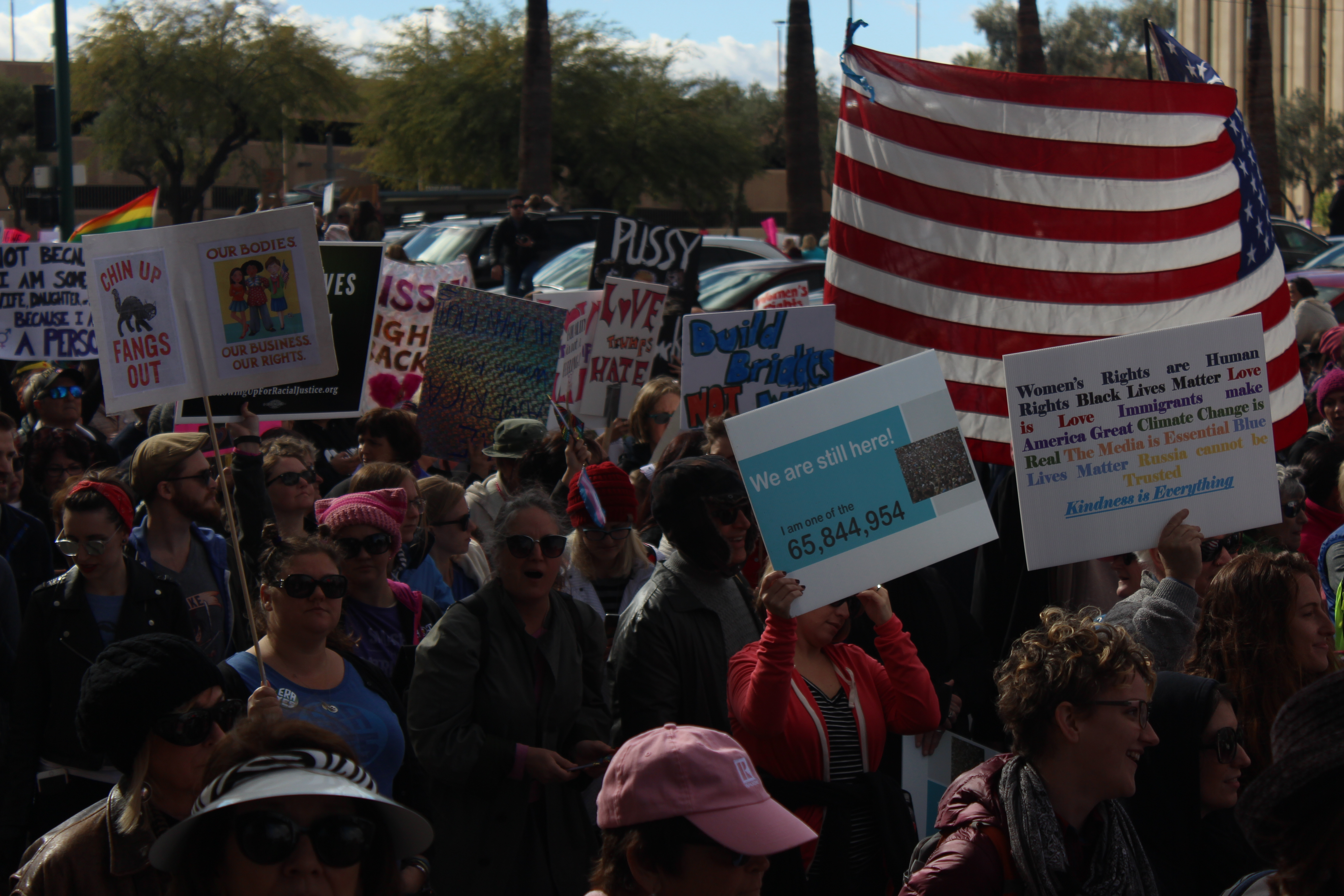
Phoenix Women's March in 2017

=== Protests ===
Women from the state participated in marches supporting abortion rights as part of a #StoptheBans movement in May 2019. On May 21, 2019, large number of women protested abortion laws passed in other states outside the Arizona Capitol building.

Protests began in Phoenix around 7:00 p.m. MST June 24, 2022 in response to the overturning of Roe v. Wade. Demonstrations moved to the Arizona State Capitol, with it being mostly peaceful. Protestors began banging on the building around 8:30 pm, prompting an evacuation of lawmakers and staff, which led to SWAT officers being deployed around the building. The protests were later called "an insurrection aimed at overthrowing the state government" by Republican Senate President Karen Fann; the Arizona Department of Public Safety fired tear gas when protestors attempted to break into the building. On June 25 a smaller number of people protested, with four people arrested on suspicion of rioting and disorderly conduct, including an identified member of the National Lawyers Guild Legal observer. Protestors marched through Phoenix again on July 1.

On January 20, 2024, thousands of abortion rights protesters rallied and marched at more than 100 Women's March events nationwide, with the main events held in Phoenix, Arizona and Washington, DC.

On April 9, 2024, an abortion-rights protest was held in Phoenix following the Arizona Supreme Court's decision to allow a near-total abortion ban from 1864 to take effect.

On April 11, 2024, Democrats in the Arizona state senate began chanting "Shame! Shame! Shame on you!" following the Republicans' decision to block an effort by Democrats to repeal the 1864 ban.

On April 17, 2024, hundreds of abortion rights protesters rallied outside of the Arizona State Capitol in Phoenix.

On June 8, 2024, Vote For Abortion kicked off its campaign with a bus tour across Phoenix, ending with a rally outside the Arizona State House.

=== Activists ===
==== Sherri Finkbine ====
One case in 1962 dealt with a woman named Sherri Finkbine. An Arizona resident since 1958, Finkbine then had four healthy children, ages 7, 5, 3, and 18 months. During her pregnancy with her fifth child, she discovered the child might have severe deformities. Finkbine had been taking sleeping pills that contained a drug called thalidomide, which was also very popular in several countries. She had later learned that the drug was causing fetal deformities and she wanted to warn the general public. Finkbine strongly wanted an abortion; however, the abortion laws of Arizona limited her decision. In Arizona, an abortion could only occur if the mother's life was in danger. Physicians at Good Samaritan Hospital approved a therapeutic abortion. However, prior to the scheduled procedure, Finkbine told her story to The Arizona Republic to warn other women about the dangers of the drug. At her request, the newspaper did not publish her name; however, it did publish enough information to identify her. The hospital, seeking to avoid exposure to criminal proceedings against its physicians, sought a declaratory judgment that the scheduled therapeutic abortion met the exception to the Arizona law banning all abortions except where necessary to save the life of the mother. The court denied the request on procedural grounds. On August 5, 1962, Finkbine traveled to Sweden, where after a two-week evaluation, she was able to obtain a legal abortion. Swedish physicians confirmed the fetus was severely malformed.
