= Steven Jensen =

Steven Jensen may refer to:

- Steven Allan Jensen (1955–2022), American professional ice hockey player
- Steven J. Jensen (born 1964), American philosopher
- Steven Ronald Jensen (1959–2005), American musician
- Steven R. Jensen, the chief justice of the South Dakota Supreme Court
- Steve Jensen, American ice hockey player
