= Excommunication of Margaret McBride =

Abortion controversy in 2009

The excommunication of Margaret McBride occurred with the sanctioning by the American religious sister Margaret McBride in November 2009 of an abortion at a Catholic hospital, St. Joseph's Hospital, in Phoenix. It was lifted in December 2011. Her decision and her subsequent excommunication aroused controversy in the areas of medical ethics and Catholic theology.

== Margaret McBride ==
Sister Margaret Mary McBride is a Sister of Mercy. She received her Bachelor of Science in nursing and her Master of Public Administration from the University of San Francisco. She has served as a board member of several organizations, including Hospice of the Valley, Catholic Charities, Mercy Housing Southwest, and Southwest Catholic Health Network.

== Decision and excommunication ==
McBride was an administrator and member of the ethics committee at St. Joseph's Hospital and Medical Center, Phoenix, Arizona, which is owned by Catholic Healthcare West, later, Dignity Health. On 27 November 2009, the committee was consulted on the case of a 27-year-old woman who was eleven weeks pregnant with her fifth child and suffering from pulmonary hypertension. Her doctors stated that the woman's chance of dying if the pregnancy was allowed to continue was "close to 100 percent".

McBride joined the ethics committee in approving the decision to terminate the pregnancy through an induced abortion. The abortion took place and the mother survived.

Afterwards, the abortion came to the attention of Bishop Thomas J. Olmsted, the bishop of the Catholic Diocese of Phoenix. Olmsted spoke to McBride privately and she confirmed her participation in the procurement of the abortion. Olmsted informed her that in allowing the abortion, she had incurred a latae sententiae (an automatic) excommunication. McBride was subsequently reassigned from her post as vice president of mission integration at the hospital.

In May 2010, the incident came to the attention of the Arizona Republic newspaper, which asked the hospital and the bishop for comments. Both the bishop and the hospital provided answers to the newspaper's request, and the two statements were published online, on 15 May 2010.

In December 2010, Olmsted announced that the Diocese of Phoenix was severing its affiliation with the hospital, after months of discussion had failed to obtain from the hospital management a promise not to perform abortions in the future. "If we are presented with a situation in which a pregnancy threatens a woman's life, our first priority is to save both patients. If that is not possible, we will always save the life we can save, and that is what we did in this case," said hospital president Linda Hunt. "Morally, ethically, and legally, we simply cannot stand by and let someone die whose life we might be able to save."

== Return to good standing ==
In November 2011, McBride commented: "So I want you to know that in my journey I did reconcile with the church. The church means something very different to me today. Something has to be taken away sometimes for you to appreciate it even more. So it is now that I believe I am called to do something and I don't know what that something is, but I pray that through the grace of God to give me that opportunity to know what the next step is for me".

In December 2011, a statement from St. Joseph's Hospital was emailed to the Catholic News Service announcing that McBride had since her excommunication "met the requirements for reinstatement with the church and she is no longer excommunicated. She continues to be a member in good standing with the Sisters of Mercy and is a valued member of the St. Joseph's executive team". The hospital did not provide further details. At the time, McBride was the St. Joseph's Hospital's vice president for organizational outreach.

== Reactions ==
The incident rapidly became a touchstone in the culture wars in the United States.

The hospital's spokesperson explained that while the hospital follows the Ethical and Religious Directives for Catholic Health Care Services, these directives do not answer all questions. McBride's supporters have argued that the abortion was licit under the terms of Directive 47 of the "Ethical and Religious Directives for Catholic Health Care Services", issued by the United States Conference of Catholic Bishops. Those who reject this argument note that Directive 47 (which refers to "operations, treatments, and medications that have as their direct purpose the cure of a proportionately serious pathological condition of a pregnant woman") applies only in the case of the death of the unborn child as an unintended consequence, according to the "principle of double effect", while the preceding Directive 45 in the same document explicitly states: "Abortion (that is, the directly intended termination of pregnancy before viability or the directly intended destruction of a viable fetus) is never permitted. Every procedure whose sole immediate effect is the termination of pregnancy before viability is an abortion, which, in its moral context, includes the interval between conception and implantation of the embryo. Catholic health care institutions are not to provide abortion services, even based upon the principle of material cooperation."

In explanation of how McBride excommunicated herself through her actions, Father John Ehrich, medical ethics director for the diocese of Phoenix, issued the statement: "The unborn child can never be thought of as a pathology or an illness. That is, the child is not that which threatens the life of the mother, rather it is the pathology or illness (cancer, premature rupture of membranes, hypertension, preeclampsia, etc.) which threatens the mother's life." Since "no physician can predict what will happen with 100 percent accuracy", Ehrich wrote, "What we should not do [...] is lower risks associated with pregnancy by aborting children."

However, critics condemned the decision and suggested that it reflected larger trends. Jacob M. Appel, a leading American bioethicist, questioned "if women are safe in Catholic hospitals" following Olmsted's announcement. Appel wrote that, "Like many Catholic hospitals, St. Joseph's has long had two conflicting policies regarding maternal-fetal conflict on its books. One directive states that abortion is never permitted, even to save the life of the mother, while the other notes that "operations, treatments and medications that have as their direct purpose the cure of a proportionately serious pathological condition of a pregnant woman are permitted [...] even if they will result in the death of the unborn child. [...] Until this recent incident, pregnant women could safely assume that Catholic hospitals would follow both the law and widespread standards of medical ethics in allowing the second directive to trump the first. Suddenly, that time-honored understanding appears to be in jeopardy."

Catholics for Choice, an independent pro-choice organization, also expressed concerns regarding the decision. Its president, Jon O'Brien, said, "While not all the facts are available, it is clear that the Vatican's hard line on abortion led to this terrible situation. Sadly, we see situations like this time after time, both here in the US and abroad. The Vatican's outright ban on all abortions is insensitive and reflects an unwillingness to acknowledge the reality of women's lives, including the difficult decisions that often have to be made during a pregnancy."

The Reverend Thomas Doyle, a well-known canon lawyer, noted that the bishop "clearly had other alternatives than to declare her excommunicated." Doyle argued that this case highlights a "gross inequity" in how the church chooses to handle scandal. He noted that at the time no priest had been excommunicated for sexual abuse, suggesting a double standard within the church; this is now no longer the case, since pedophile priest Jose Mercau was excommunicated by Pope Francis.

The theologian Michael Liccone stated: "The Church does not condemn 'indirect abortion': abortion that is a foreseen but unintended side effect of a medical procedure designed to preserve the mother's life"; he added that McBride, considered an ethics expert at the hospital, had explained her decision by telling Olmsted that she saw the abortion in this scenario as indirect. Liccone said that Olmsted's decision to say that McBride had excommunicated herself, rather than to excommunicate her ferendae sententiae "by his own juridical act", raised questions.

Steven J. Jensen, a professor of philosophy at the University of St. Thomas, criticized accounts trying to justify the Phoenix case as based upon an incoherent account of intention. He did not believe the principle of double effect applied, saying the doctors intended to kill via dilation and curettage. "This cutting is a kind of violent harm to the baby. The harm is not distinct from the cutting but is precisely that cutting insofar as it relates to the baby. [...] This cutting is a cause that the doctor must include within the means he chooses".

== See also ==
- Catholic Church and abortion
- Abortion in the United States
- Death of Savita Halappanavar
- List of people excommunicated by the Roman Catholic Church
