= List of cardinals excommunicated by the Catholic Church =

Only a few dozen cardinals of the Roman Catholic Church have been excommunicated by the Catholic Church. A cardinal is a Roman Catholic priest, deacon, or bishop entitled to vote in a papal election. They are collectively known as the College of Cardinals.

Excommunication—literally, the denial of communion—usually means that a person is barred from participating in the Sacraments or holding ecclesiastical office. Ne Romani (1311), promulgated by Pope Clement V during the Council of Vienne, extended suffrage in papal election to excommunicated cardinals in an attempt to limit schisms.

This list includes only cardinals who have been explicitly excommunicated by a pope or ecumenical council, rather than those who (depending on one's interpretation) may have been excommunicated latae sententiae. For example, several precepts of papal election law prescribed automatic excommunication, such as Licet de vitanda of the Lateran Council which prohibited election by one-third, and Pope Pius X's Commissum Nobis, which made the exercise of the jus exclusivae by any cardinal punishable by excommunication. It also does not include excommunicated quasi-cardinals (cardinals elevated by antipopes) or clerics excommunicated before receiving the red hat.

Many excommunicated cardinals reconciled (most often with the successor of their excommunicator) and had their offices restored. Some would later be elected pope; for example, Formosus and Sergius III.

== 9th century ==
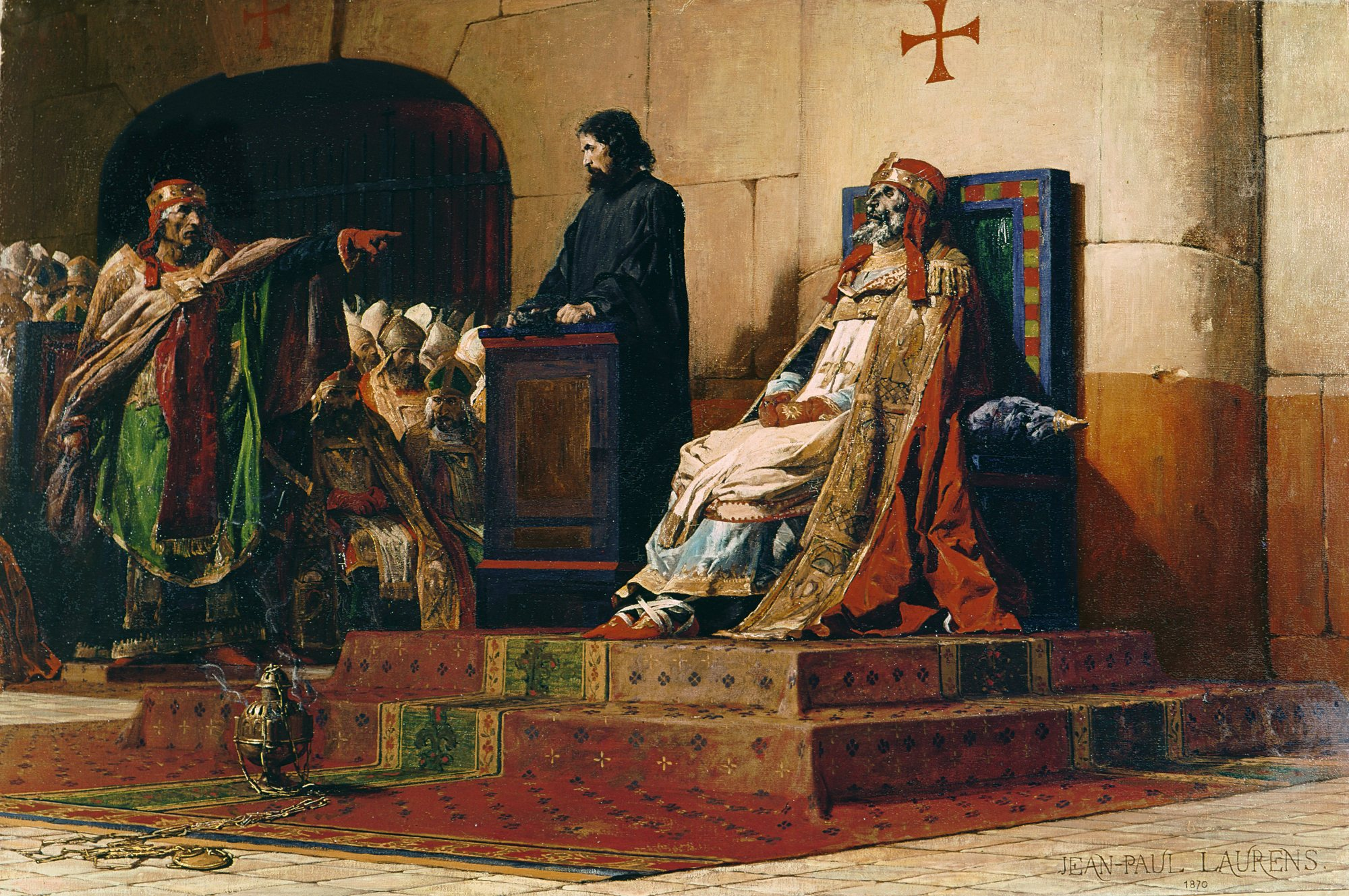
Pope Formosus, who was posthumously exhumed and tried in the Cadaver Synod, had previously been excommunicated by his predecessor as pope; all the participants in the Cadaver Synod themselves were later excommunicated

Cardinal	Elevating pope	Date of elevation	Excommunicating pope or council	Date of excommunication	Reason	Notes
Rodoaldo, bishop of Porto	Leo IV	853	Nicholas I	864	Simony	
Anastasio il Bibliotecario	Leo IV	847	Council of Rome; Council of Ravenna; Council of Rome	December 16, 850; May 29, 853; December 8, 853	Intrigue against the pope	Reconciled with Nicholas I and Adrian II
Formosus	Nicholas I	861	John VIII	867	Various charges	Reconciled with Marinus I; future Pope Formosus; re-excommunicated posthumously by the Cadaver Synod
Sergio	Stephen V	ante 897	John IX/Roman Synod	April 898	Role in the Cadaver Synod	Later reconciled; future Pope Sergius III
Benedetto	Formosus	ante 896	John IX/Roman Synod	April 898	Role in the Cadaver Synod	
Martino	Formosus	ante 896	John IX/Roman Synod	April 898	Role in the Cadaver Synod	
Giovanni	Formosus	ante 896	John IX/Roman Synod	April 898	Role in the Cadaver Synod	
Pasquale	Formosus	ante 896	John IX/Roman Synod	April 898	Role in the Cadaver Synod	
Leone	Formosus	ante 896	John IX/Roman Synod	April 898	Role in the Cadaver Synod	

== 11th century ==
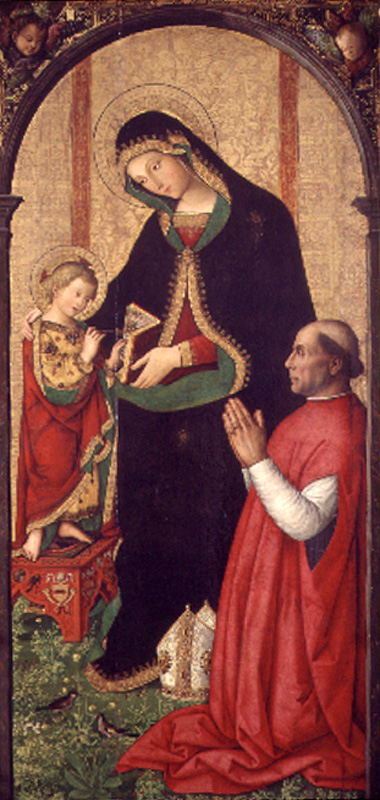
Francisco de Borja died before learning of his excommunication.

Cardinal	Elevating pope	Date of elevation	Excommunicating pope or council	Date of excommunication	Reason	Notes
Hugh of Remiremont	Leo IX	1049	Gregory VII/Roman synod of Letran	March 3, 1078	Simony	Joined Antipope Clement III
Richard Milhau	Gregory VII	Ante May 7, 1078	Victor III/Council of Benevento	August 1087	Joined allegiance of Antipope Clement III	

== 12th century ==
Cardinal	Elevating pope	Date of elevation	Excommunicating pope or council	Date of excommunication	Reason	Notes
Pietro Pierleoni	Paschal II	ca.1112	Innocent II/Council of Reims	October 18, 1131	Election as Antipope Anacletus II	
Ottaviano de' Monticelli	Innocent II	1138	Alexander III	1162 and 1163	Election as Antipope Victor IV	

== 13th century ==
Cardinal	Elevating pope	Date of elevation	Excommunicating pope or council	Date of excommunication	Reason	Notes
Riccardo	Innocent IV or Alexander IV	Between 1252 and 1256	Alexander IV	April 10, 1259	He participated in the coronation of Manfred Hohenstauf	
Giacomo Colonna	Nicholas III	March 12, 1278	Boniface VIII	May 10, 1297	He corresponded secretly with Frederick III of Sicily and with Philip IV of France; and refused to surrender to the pope the fortresses that he possessed	Rehabilitated by Benedict XI (1303–1304) and reinstated by Clement V on December 17, 1305
Pietro Colonna	Nicholas IV	May 16, 1288	Boniface VIII	May 10, 1297	He corresponded secretly with Frederick III of Sicily and with Philip IV of France; and refused to surrender to the pope the fortresses that he possessed	Rehabilitated by Benedict XI (1303–1304) and reinstated by Clement V on December 17, 1305

== 15th century ==
Cardinal	Elevating pope	Date of elevation	Excommunicating pope or council	Date of excommunication	Reason	Notes
Louis Aleman	Eugene IV		Eugene IV	December 11, 1440	Role in the Council of Basel	Reconciled with Nicholas V

== 16th century ==
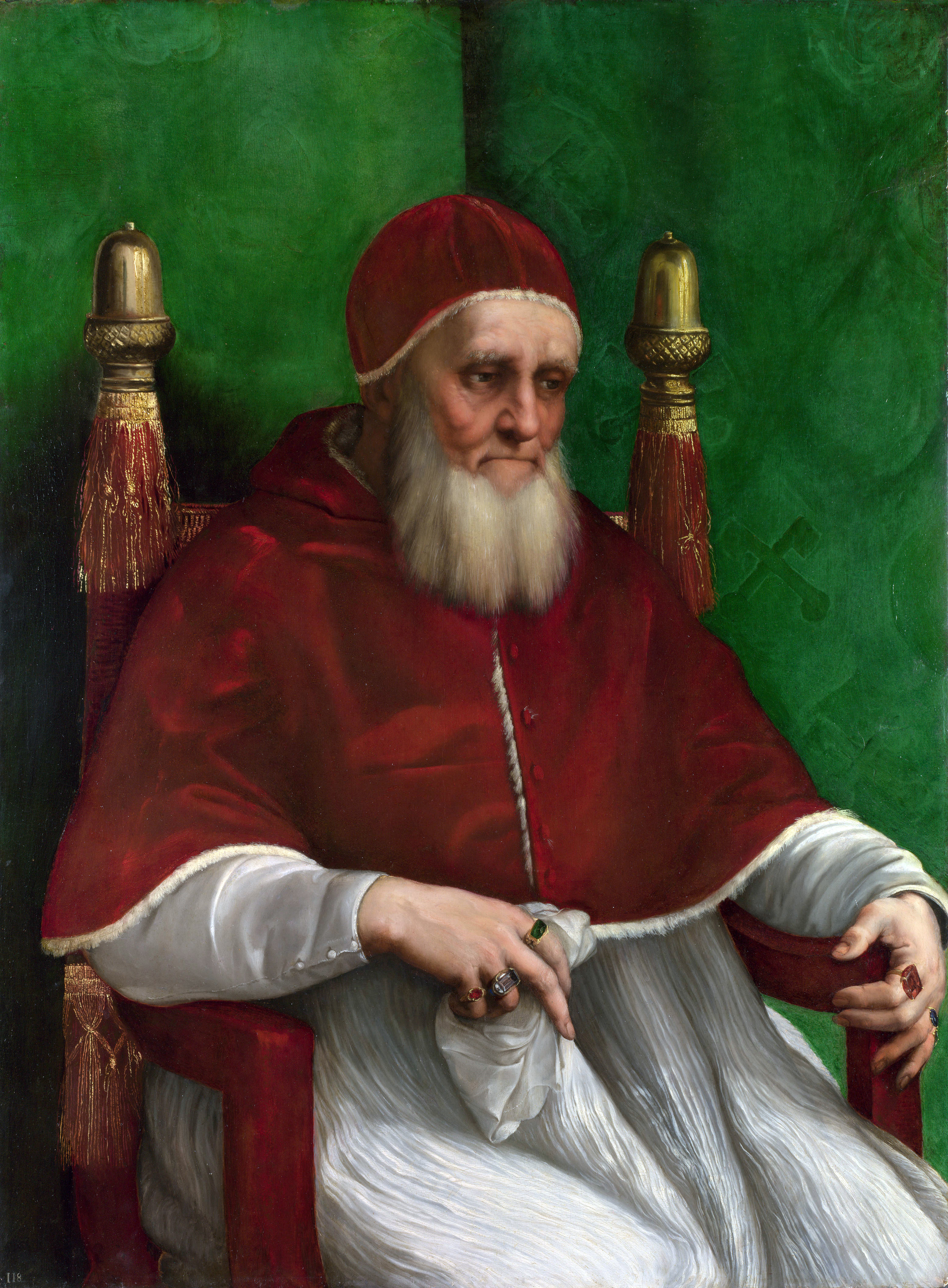
Pope Julius II excommunicated all cardinals who participated in the Council of Pisa (1511).

Cardinal	Elevating pope	Date of elevation	Excommunicating pope or council	Date of excommunication	Reason	Notes
Francisco de Borja	Alexander VI	September 28, 1500	Julius II	October 24, 1511	Role in the Council of Pisa	Cardinal-nephew; Died before his conciliar colleagues reconciled
Federico di Sanseverino	Innocent VIII	March 9, 1489	Julius II	October 24, 1511	Role in the Council of Pisa	Reconciled with Leo X
Bernardino López de Carvajal	Alexander VI	September 20, 1493	Julius II	October 24, 1511	Role in the Council of Pisa	Reconciled with Leo X
Guillaume Briçonnet	Alexander VI	January 16, 1495	Julius II	October 24, 1511	Role in the Council of Pisa	Reconciled with Leo X
René de Prie	Julius II	December 18, 1506	Julius II	October 24, 1511	Role in the Council of Pisa	Reconciled with Leo X
Odet de Coligny	Clement VII	7 November 1533	Pius IV	31 March 1563	Apostasy (conversion to Calvinism)	Never ordained. Died in exile in England, buried in Canterbury Cathedral

== 18th century ==
Cardinal	Elevating pope	Date of elevation	Excommunicating pope or council	Date of excommunication	Reason	Notes
Niccolò Coscia	Benedict XIII	June 11, 1725	Clement XII	May 9, 1733	Financial irregularities	Reconciled with Clement XII

== See also ==
- List of people excommunicated by the Roman Catholic Church
