= Interstices =

Term in Roman Catholic religion

In Roman Catholicism, the interstices is a period of at least three months between the ordination of a man to the diaconate and his ordination to the priesthood. A bishop may shorten the length of this interval if he has an extraordinary reason for doing so. It is generally longer than three months.

It has been applied to many other offices as well. When rules for the progression of a candidate through church offices were first codified in the 4th and 5th centuries, for example, some bishops established a waiting period of four years as acolyte or subdeacon and five years as a deacon.
