= James Steven Rausch =

Catholic bishop (1928–1981)

His Excellency, The Most Reverend James Steven Rausch
- Bishop of Phoenix
- Church: Roman Catholic
- See: Diocese of Phoenix
- In office: June 17, 1977 to May 18, 1981
- Predecessor: Edward A. McCarthy
- Successor: Thomas J. O'Brien
- Previous posts: Auxiliary Bishop of St. Cloud; 1973 to 1977

Orders
- Ordination: June 2, 1956 by Peter William Bartholome
- Consecration: April 16, 1973 by John Krol

Personal details
- Born: September 4, 1928 Albany, Minnesota, US
- Died: May 18, 1981 (aged 52) Phoenix, Arizona, US
- Education: University of Minnesota; St. Thomas College; Pontifical Gregorian University
- Motto: To prepare the way

James Steven Rausch (September 4, 1928 – May 18, 1981) was an American prelate of the Roman Catholic Church. He served as the second bishop of the Diocese of Phoenix in Arizona from 1977 until his death in 1981. He previously served as an auxiliary bishop of the Diocese of St. Cloud in Minnesota from 1973 to 1977.

== Biography ==
=== Early life ===
James Rausch was born in Albany, Minnesota on September 4, 1928. He attended Catholic schools in both Indiana and Minnesota. After studying economics at the University of Minnesota, Rausch received a Master of Education degree from St. Thomas College in St. Paul, Minnesota, He later earned a Doctor of Pastoral Psychology degree from the Pontifical Gregorian University in Rome.

=== Priesthood ===
Rausch was ordained a priest at the Cathedral of Saint Mary in St. Cloud for the Diocese of Saint Cloud on June 2, 1956, by Bishop Peter William Bartholome. In 1970, he became assistant general secretary of the United States Catholic Conference (USCC), the service arm of the National Conference of Catholic Bishops (NCCB). He became general secretary of both groups in 1972.

=== Auxiliary Bishop of St. Cloud ===
On March 5, 1973, Pope Paul VI appointed Rausch as auxiliary bishop of St. Cloud; he was consecrated by Cardinal John Krol at the Cathedral of Saint Mary on April 16, 1973.

=== Bishop of Phoenix ===
On June 17, 1977, Paul VI appointed Rausch as bishop of Phoenix. He was known for his advocacy of ecumenicism and for speaking out against abortion rights for women. On occasion, he would celebrate mass in orange groves to accommodate undocumented migrants who were afraid to go into a city.

James Rausch died in Phoenix of a heart attack on May 18, 1981, at age 52.

Catholic Church titles
| Preceded by Edward A. McCarthy | Bishop of Phoenix; 1977–1981 | Succeeded by Thomas J. O'Brien |
