= Thomas J. O'Brien (bishop) =

Catholic bishop (1935–2018)

His Excellency, The Most Reverend Thomas Joseph O'Brien
- Bishop of Phoenix
- Church: Roman Catholic
- Diocese: Phoenix
- Appointed: November 9, 1981
- Installed: January 18, 1982
- Term ended: June 18, 2003
- Predecessor: James Steven Rausch
- Successor: Thomas Olmsted

Orders
- Ordination: May 7, 1961 by Paul Clarence Schulte
- Consecration: January 6, 1982 by John Paul II, Eduardo Martínez Somalo, and Lucas Moreira Neves

Personal details
- Born: November 29, 1935 Indianapolis, Indiana, U.S.
- Died: August 26, 2018 (aged 82) Phoenix, Arizona, U.S.
- Education: St. Meinrad Seminary
- Motto: To build up the Body of Christ

Styles of Thomas Joseph O'Brien
- Reference style: His Excellency; The Most Reverend
- Spoken style: Your Excellency
- Religious style: Bishop

Thomas Joseph O'Brien (November 29, 1935 – August 26, 2018) was an American prelate of the Roman Catholic Church. He served as bishop of Phoenix in Arizona from 1982 to 2003.

O'Brien resigned as bishop in 2003 after his involvement in a fatal hit-and-run accident.

== Biography ==
=== Early life and ministry ===
Thomas O'Brien was born on November 29, 1935, in Indianapolis, Indiana. He attended St. Meinrad Seminary, feeling a call to the priesthood from an early age.

O'Brien was ordained to the priesthood at the St. Meinrad Archabbey by Archbishop Paul Clarence Schulte for the Diocese of Tucson on May 7, 1961. After his ordination, the diocese assigned him as an associate pastor at Immaculate Conception Parish in Douglas, Arizona.

In 1964, O'Brien was transferred to St. Theresa Parish in Phoenix and later to St. Gregory Parish in Phoenix. He was named pastor of St. Catherine Parish in Phoenix in 1979, and also served as vicar general for the diocese.

=== Bishop of Phoenix ===
On November 9, 1981, O'Brien was appointed the third bishop of the Diocese of Phoenix by Pope John Paul II. He received his episcopal consecration on January 6, 1982, from John Paul II himself in the Basilica of Saint Peter in Rome. Archbishops Eduardo Somalo and Lucas Neves served as co-consecrators. He was formally installed as bishop of Phoenix on January 18, 1982, and selected as his episcopal motto "To Build Up the Body of Christ."

During his tenure, O'Brien earned a reputation as a successful fundraiser, builder of schools, and advocate for the poor. He was instrumental in persuading John Paul II and Mother Teresa to make their respective visits to Phoenix in 1987 and 1989. Within the United States Conference of Catholic Bishops, he chaired the Committee on Marriage and Family.

==== Sexual abuse scandal ====
In 1990, O'Brien oversaw the development and implementation of a diocesan policy to investigate sexual abuse cases involving priests. The policy was revised in 1995 and 1998, with many of its policies being adopted in the 2002 Dallas Charter. In 2002, Maricopa County prosecutors initiated a grand jury investigation into charges of sexual abuse by Catholic priests in the diocese. O'Brien was a target of that investigation for allegedly covering up allegations against other priests.

The investigation ended when O'Brien admitted he had sheltered abusive priests. He agreed to cede his authority over diocesan sexual abuse policy in exchange for immunity from indictment for obstruction of justice. On August 4, 2017, it was announced that a civil lawsuit was filed against O'Brien over allegations that he sexually molested a boy on several occasions at parishes in Phoenix and Goodyear, Arizona, from 1977 to 1982.

==== Hit-and-run crash ====
On June 14, 2003, O'Brien was driving home from a confirmation ceremony when his vehicle struck a 43-year-old pedestrian named Jim Reed. O'Brien drove away from the accident scene without stopping as required by law. Reed died from injuries.

A driver behind O'Brien reported O'Brien's license plate number to the police. Police discovered a dent in a fender and a crack in the windshield of O'Brien's Buick Park Avenue. O'Brien said he did not report the accident because he thought he had hit a dog, cat, or rock. He was arrested for leaving the scene of an accident and released on $45,000 bond.

=== Resignation and legacy ===
Pope John Paul II accepted O'Brien's resignation as bishop of Phoenix on June 18, 2003.

On February 17, 2004, after a three-and-a-half-week-long trial, O'Brien was found guilty of leaving the scene of a fatal accident. On March 26, 2004, he was sentenced to four years' probation and 1,000 hours of community service, and was required to surrender his driver's license for five years. He was the first American Catholic bishop to be convicted of a felony. O'Brien later asked for travel time to be deducted from his 1,000 hours and for flexibility in the number of hours he must serve each month.

In November 2011, the Catholic Community Foundation of Phoenix announced that it was giving O'Brien its faith honoree award. When news of the award became public, a controversy emerged over it. A few days later, O'Brien declined the award. The foundation, stating that it did not anticipate the adverse public reaction, wrote an apology to the community.

O'Brien died in Phoenix on August 26, 2018, following complications from Parkinson's disease.

== Episcopal succession ==
Catholic Church titles
Preceded by James Steven Rausch	Bishop of Phoenix; 1982–2003	Succeeded by Thomas J. Olmsted
