= Thomas Olmsted =

American Catholic prelate (born 1947)

His Excellency, The Most Reverend Thomas Olmsted
- Bishop Emeritus of Phoenix
- Church: Catholic
- Diocese: Phoenix
- Appointed: November 25, 2003
- Installed: December 20, 2003
- Retired: June 10, 2022
- Predecessor: Thomas J. O'Brien
- Successor: John P. Dolan
- Previous posts: Bishop of Wichita (2001‍–‍2003); Coadjutor Bishop of Wichita (1999‍–‍2001)

Orders
- Ordination: July 2, 1973 by James Aloysius Hickey
- Consecration: April 20, 1999 by Eugene John Gerber, James Patrick Keleher, Fabian Bruskewitz

Personal details
- Born: January 21, 1947 (age 79) Oketo, Kansas, U.S.
- Education: St. Thomas Aquinas Seminary; Pontifical North American College; Pontifical Gregorian University
- Motto: Jesus Caritas (Latin for 'Love of Jesus')
- Styles
- Reference style: His Excellency; The Most Reverend
- Spoken style: Your Excellency
- Religious style: Bishop

Thomas James Olmsted (born January 21, 1947) is an American Catholic prelate who served as Bishop of Phoenix in Arizona from 2003 to 2022.

Olmsted previously served as Bishop of Wichita in Kansas from 2001 to 2003 and as coadjutor bishop from 1999 to 2001.

== Biography ==
=== Early life ===
Olmsted was born on January 21, 1947, in Oketo, Kansas, to Pat and Helen Olmsted; he has two brothers and three sisters. Raised on a farm in Beattie, Kansas, he attended a single-room grade school and a small rural high school in Summerfield, Kansas. He then studied at St. Thomas Aquinas Seminary in Denver, where he obtained a bachelor's degree in philosophy in 1969.

=== Priesthood ===
Olmsted was ordained to the priesthood in Rome at the Basilica of Saint Peter by Bishop James Aloysius Hickey on July 2, 1973, for the Diocese of Lincoln. After his ordination, the diocese assigned Olmsted as an associate pastor at the Cathedral of the Risen Christ Parish until 1976, when he began his doctoral studies in Rome.

Olmsted earned a Doctor of Canon Law summa cum laude in Rome from the Pontifical Gregorian University in 1981, and served as an official in the Vatican Secretariat of State from 1979 to 1988. During this period, he also worked as an assistant spiritual director at the Pontifical North American College in Rome.

Upon his return to Nebraska in 1989, Olmsted was named pastor of St. Vincent de Paul Parish in Seward, Nebraska, and promoter of justice for the diocesan tribunal. He later became dean of formation (1993) and president-rector (1997) at the Pontifical College Josephinum in Worthington, Ohio.

Ordination history of Thomas Olmsted
History
Episcopal consecration
- Consecrated by: Eugene J. Gerber (Wichita)
Episcopal succession
Bishops consecrated by Thomas Olmsted as principal consecrator
- Eduardo Nevares: July 19, 2010

=== Bishop of Wichita ===
On February 16, 1999, Olmsted was appointed coadjutor bishop of Wichita by Pope John Paul II. He received his episcopal consecration on April 20, 1999, from Bishop Eugene Gerber, with Archbishop James Keleher and Bishop Fabian Bruskewitz serving as co-consecrators, at the Century II Convention Center in Wichita, Kansas. Olmsted selected as his episcopal motto: Jesus Caritas, or "Love of Jesus", the name of his priestly fraternity.

Olmsted automatically succeeded Gerber as the seventh bishop of Wichita when John Paul II accepted Gerber's resignation on October 4, 2001.

=== Bishop of Phoenix ===
John Paul II named Olmsted as the fourth bishop of Phoenix on November 25, 2003. He was installed on December 20, 2003, replacing Bishop Thomas O'Brien, who resigned after being arrested for his involvement in a fatal hit-and-run car accident.

In 2008, after the diocese had spent several million dollars to settle about 20 sexual abuse lawsuits, Olmsted led an initiative to shield diocesan assets by incorporating local parishes individually.

From January 2008 to February 2009, Olmsted served as apostolic administrator of the Diocese of Gallup, acting as that diocese's interim leader until the appointment of Bishop James S. Wall.

Under Olmsted, the Diocese of Phoenix researched and cataloged an index of its clergymen accused of sexually abusing children and released some of their identities to the public. The diocese published a list of sexually abusive clergymen on its website. Joe Baca, the Phoenix director of the Survivors Network of those Abused by Priests, stated: "It's the right thing to do and I've got to give them that much. They need to use these names to help victims to come forward. But you know, there's still more they can do."

In July 2021, in response to Pope Francis' motu proprio Traditionis custodes, which restricts the celebration of the Traditional Latin Mass (TLM), Olmsted issued a decree allowing the TLM to continue in the diocese under his dispensation pursuant to Canon 87 of the Code of Canon Law.

Early in 2022, one of Olmsted's pastors resigned after learning that he had used the incorrect words when performing thousands of baptisms. Olmsted explained the importance of using the correct language in a letter to parishioners and said he believed the error, however inadvertent, required new baptisms.

=== Retirement ===
Francis accepted Olmsted's resignation as bishop of Phoenix on June 10, 2022. Olmsted, despite his retirement, was to remain apostolic administrator of the Ruthenian Catholic Eparchy of the Holy Protection of Mary of Phoenix.

On August 1, 2018, Francis named Olmsted as apostolic administrator sede plena of the Ruthenian Catholic Eparchy of the Holy Protection of Mary of Phoenix On August 23, 2021, he was named apostolic administrator Sede vacante when Francis accepted the resignation of Bishop John Pazak. The pope replaced Olmsted as apostolic administrator on January 1, 2023, with Bishop Kurt Burnette from the Ruthenian Catholic Eparchy of Passaic in New Jersey.

=== Excommunication of Margaret McBride ===
In May 2010, Olmsted declared that Sister Margaret McBride, a member of the ethics committee of St. Joseph’s Hospital and Medical Center in Phoenix, was automatically excommunicated after permitting a patient to undergo an abortion there. The patient was a woman who was 11 weeks pregnant and suffering from pulmonary hypertension. Hospital doctors had told the committee that the likelihood of the patient dying if the pregnancy was not terminated to be "close to 100 percent".

Olmsted accused McBride of permitting a "direct abortion," which according to the Catholic Church is always wrong. He stated that she admitted to him giving “... her consent that the abortion was a morally good and allowable act according to Church teaching". "Since she gave her consent and encouraged an abortion she automatically excommunicated herself from the Church.”

As a result of the McBride case, and because the hospital refused to ban future abortions, Olmsted in December 2010, severed the diocese's ties with St. Joseph's and stated that it could no longer refer to itself as "a Catholic hospital".

=== Relations with Sheriff Joe Arpaio ===
In 2009, a photograph became public showing Olmsted standing alongside Maricopa County Sheriff Joe Arpaio at the tent city jail in Phoenix. Olmsted was accused of given Arpaio permission to use the photo in his re-election campaign. The diocese denied the charges, stating:

"Despite these allegations, we are fairly certain this never happened, and if it did, it was something we were completely unaware of and done without Bishop Olmsted's knowledge or consent."

== Viewpoints ==
=== Abortion ===
During the 2008 U.S. presidential election, Olmsted declared a candidate's position on abortion rights for women to be the most important consideration for voters, stating,

"When it comes to direct attacks on innocent human life, being right on all the other issues can never justify a wrong choice on this most serious matter."

In March 2009, Olmsted spoke against President Barack Obama's decision to reverse restrictions on embryonic stem cell research, saying, "American taxpayers will now be paying for the killing of human beings at a very early stage in their lives (as embryos), so that scientific research can make use of them for experiments that may or may not yield positive results." He also referred to embryonic stem cell research as "homicidal research".

In March 2009, Olmsted criticized the University of Notre Dame for selecting Obama as the commencement speaker for its graduation ceremony and awarding him an honorary doctoral degree, calling the choice a "grave mistake." Olmsted said that Notre Dame's actions went against a previous decision of the United States Conference of Catholic Bishops in their June 2004 Statement “Catholics in Political Life”: "The Catholic community and Catholic institutions should not honor those who act in defiance of our fundamental moral principles. They should not be given awards, honors or platforms which would suggest support for their actions."

=== LBGT rights ===
On September 12, 2008, Olmsted released a YouTube video urging Arizona voters to vote for Proposition 102, a referendum to amend the Arizona Constitution to define marriage as the union of one man and one woman. The proposition passed, but it was struck down in court in 2014.

=== Immigration ===
On March 8, 2010, Olmsted signed a letter expressing concern over Arizona SB 1070. He indicated that if the law passed, it might instill fear in those undocumented immigrants who are crime victims and deter them from going to the police out of fears of deportation.

== See also ==
- Catholic Church hierarchy
- Catholic Church in the United States
- Historical list of the Catholic bishops of the United States
- List of Catholic bishops of the United States
- Lists of patriarchs, archbishops, and bishops

Catholic Church titles
Preceded by Eugene John Gerber	Bishop of Wichita; 2001–2003	Succeeded by Michael Owen Jackels
Preceded by Thomas J. O'Brien	Bishop of Phoenix; 2003–2022	Succeeded by John P. Dolan
