= Steven J. Jensen =

American philosopher (born 1964)

- Born: 1964 (age 61–62)

Philosophical work
- Era: 21st-century philosophy
- Region: Western philosophy
- Institutions: University of St. Thomas, Texas
- Main interests: Natural law

Steven J. Jensen (born 1964) is an American philosopher and Bishop Wendelin J. Nold Chair in Graduate Philosophy at the University of St. Thomas, Texas. Jensen is known for his works on natural law.

== Books ==
- Good and Evil Actions, Catholic University of America Press, 2010
- Living the Good Life: A Beginner's Thomistic Ethics, Catholic University of America Press, 2013
- Knowing the Natural Law: From Precepts and Inclinations to Deriving Oughts, Catholic University of America Press, 2015
- Sin: A Thomistic Psychology. Washington, D.C.: The Catholic University of America Press, 2018
- The Human Person: A Beginner's Thomistic Psychology, Catholic University of America Press, 2018
- Agent Relative Ethics, Routledge, 2023
- The Natural Law: A Beginner's Thomistic Guide, Catholic University of America Press, 2025
