= Jose Mercau =

Jose Mercau is a former Catholic priest of Argentina who was excommunicated by Pope Francis in 2014.

== See also ==
- Catholic Church sexual abuse cases
