= List of schools of the Roman Catholic Diocese of Gallup =

This is a list of schools of the Roman Catholic Diocese of Gallup, in New Mexico and Arizona.

== Schools ==
Arizona

- St. Michael Indian School (K-12), St. Michaels
- St. Anthony School (K-8), Show Low
  - Circa 2009 it covered to grade 4. As of that time it was adding the 5th grade the following year and adding another grade each year until grade 8.
- Immaculate Heart of Mary Preschool, Page

New Mexico

- Sacred Heart School, Farmington
  - It was established in 1910.
- Sacred Heart School, Gallup
  - In 2020 the diocese sold the former building to Hozho Academy, a charter school. In 2020 the diocese had plans to build a new school facility, located on the property of Sacred Heart Cathedral.
- St. Anthony School, Zuni Pueblo
  - The school began operations on September 3, 1923. The Sisters of Saint Francis of Perpetual Adoration operated the school. Its initial enrollment was 43.
- St. Bonaventure Indian School, Thoreau - K-8, but was K-12 from 1986 to 2001
- St. Francis of Assisi School, Lumberton
- St. Joseph School, San Fidel
- St. Teresa of Avila School, Grants
  - The school building opened in 1945.
- St. Francis Preschool, Gallup

== Former schools ==
- Gallup Catholic School (K-12), Gallup, New Mexico (High school closed in 2013)
- Immaculate Conception School, Cuba, New Mexico
- St. Francis of Assisi School, Gallup, New Mexico
