= Donald Edmond Pelotte =

Catholic bishop (1945–2010)

His Eminence, The Most Reverend Donald Edmond Pelotte S.S.S.
- Bishop of Gallup
- Church: Roman Catholic Church
- See: Diocese of Gallup
- In office: March 31, 1990 to April 30, 2008
- Predecessor: Jerome J. Hastrich
- Successor: James S. Wall

Orders
- Ordination: September 2, 1972 by Edward Cornelius O'Leary
- Consecration: May 6, 1986 by Robert Fortune Sanchez

Personal details
- Born: April 13, 1945 Waterville, Maine, US
- Died: January 7, 2010 (aged 64) Gallup, New Mexico, US
- Education: John Carroll University; Fordham University
- Motto: Strengthen one another

Styles of Donald Edmond Pelotte
- Reference style: The Most Reverend
- Spoken style: Your Excellency
- Religious style: Monsignor
- Posthumous style: none

Donald Edmond Pelotte, SSS (April 13, 1945 – January 7, 2010) was an American Catholic prelate of Abenaki descent who served as the Bishop of Gallup from 1986 to 2008. Pelotte is commonly described as the first Native American to be appointed a Catholic bishop in the United States. He was a member of the Congregation of the Blessed Sacrament.

== Biography ==
=== Early life ===
Donald Pelotte was born on April 13, 1945, in Waterville, Maine, to Norris Albert Pelotte and Margaret Yvonne LaBrie Pelotte. His father was Abenaki, and his mother was of French-Canadian descent. Donald and his twin brother Dana were the youngest of five brothers.

Donald Pelotte studied at Eymard Seminary in Hyde Park, New York during his high school years. He did his college studies at John Carroll University in Cleveland, Ohio and later completed doctoral studies at Fordham University in New York City. His doctoral dissertation was titled John Courtney Murray, Theologian in Conflict: Roman Catholicism and the American Experience. This was later published in book form by the Paulist Press.

=== Priesthood ===
Pelotte was ordained a priest for the Congregation of the Blessed Sacrament on September 2, 1972, by Bishop Edward Cornelius O’Leary. At age 33, he became the Provincial Superior of the Congregation. He was the youngest major superior of a religious community of men in the United States at the time.

=== Coadjutor Bishop and Bishop of Gallup ===
On February 24, 1986, Pope John Paul II named Pelotte as coadjutor bishop of Gallup; he was consecrated at the Red Rock State Park Arena near Gallup on May 6, 1986 by Archbishop Robert Fortune Sanchez. Upon the retirement of Jerome J. Hastrich, then bishop of Gallup, on March 31, 1990, Pelotte automatically replaced him.

From 1986 to 2008, Pelotte also served as the episcopal moderator of the Tekakwitha Conference, an association of Native American and First Nation Catholics. In 1992, Pelotte walked out of the Tekawitha annual meeting. This was in response to a dissident group within the conference that accused the Catholic Church of ignoring Native American rituals.

Pelotte is also the only known Catholic bishop to have ordained his own twin brother to the priesthood. He ordained Dana F. Pelotte on September 4, 1999, in Waterville.

On July 23, 2007, Pelotte suffered a traumatic brain injury at his Gallup home. According to chancery officials and a police report, Pelotte said that he fell down his stairs. He was hospitalized at John C. Lincoln Hospital in Phoenix, Arizona, spending some time in the intensive care unit.

On January 3, 2008, Pope Benedict XVI appointed Thomas Olmsted, the bishop of Phoenix, as apostolic administrator sede plena of Gallup, and granted Pelotte a one-year leave of absence to continue his recovery. One year later, after seeing pictures of himself from the Emergency Department, Pelotte said he was no longer sure that his injuries were the result of a fall. This statement fueled speculation that his injuries came from being assaulted.

=== Retirement and legacy ===
On April 30, 2008, Benedict XVI accepted Pelotte's resignation as bishop of Gallup.

On December 30, 2009, Pelotte was hospitalized in Gallup in critical condition. He died on January 7, 2010. The funeral mass for Pelotte was held on January 14, 2010, at the Sacred Heart Cathedral in Gallup. Per his wishes, he was buried in the crypt of the cathedral.

Catholic Church titles
Preceded by Jerome J. Hastrich	Bishop of Gallup; 31 March 1990 – 30 April 2008	Succeeded by James S. Wall
