= Espelage =

Espelage is a surname. Notable people with the surname include:

- Bernard T. Espelage (1892–1971), American prelate
- Dorothy Espelage (fl. 1997), American psychologist
- Sylvester Espelage (1877–1940), American bishop
