= Robert Fortune Sanchez =

His Excellency, The Most Reverend Robert Fortune Sanchez
- Archbishop of Santa Fe
- Church: Roman Catholic Church
- See: Santa Fe
- In office: July 1, 1974 – April 6, 1993
- Predecessor: James Peter Davis
- Successor: Michael J. Sheehan

Orders
- Ordination: December 20, 1959 by Martin John O'Connor
- Consecration: July 25, 1974 by Jean Jadot

Personal details
- Born: March 20, 1934 Socorro, New Mexico, US
- Died: January 20, 2012 (aged 77) Albuquerque, New Mexico, US

Robert Fortune Sanchez (March 20, 1934 – January 20, 2012) was an American prelate of the Roman Catholic Church. He served as archbishop of the Archdiocese of Santa Fe, New Mexico from 1974 to 1993.

== Biography ==
=== Early life ===
Robert Sanchez was born on March 20, 1934, in Socorro, New Mexico, the son of Julius Caesar Sanchez and Priscilla Fortune. As a teenager Sanchez felt a religious calling to the Catholic priesthood and entered the Immaculate Heart Seminary of the Archdiocese to this end, completing his college studies at St. Michael's College, now the Santa Fe University of Art and Design. Showing great promise, he was sent to study theology at the Pontifical North American College in Rome.

=== Priesthood ===
Sanchez was ordained to the priesthood at the North American College for the Archdiocese of Santa Fe on December 20, 1959, by Archbishop Martin John O'Connor.

After his ordination, Archbishop Edwin Byrne assigned Sanchez to a pastoral role at a parish in Albuquerque, New Mexico. He also served in several positions in a local Catholic high school, for which he earned a teaching certificate from the University of New Mexico in 1964. Sanchez earned a degree in canon law as well from the Catholic University of America in Washington, D.C. He went on to serve in various positions of leadership in the archdiocese, including that of vicar general.

=== Archbishop of Santa Fe ===
Pope Paul VI appointed Sanchez as archbishop of Santa Fe on July 1, 1974. He was the first Hispanic to be named an archbishop of the Catholic Church in the United States. He was consecrated at the Albuquerque Sports Stadium in Albuquerque on July 25, 1974 by Archbishop Jean Jadot. He was assisted in this by Bishop Patrick Flores. The service was attended by 14,000 people.

Sanchez became a noted spokesman for the Latino community within the hierarchy of the Catholic Church in the United States and spoke out often on political issues affecting this population. He established models for outreach to ethnic minorities of use throughout the county. He offered an official apology to the Native Americans of the Southwest for how both his Spanish ancestors and the Catholic Church had treated them. He ordained the first Native American to be named a bishop in the Catholic Church, for the Roman Catholic Diocese of Gallup, Donald Pelotte.

Many new pastoral plans to meet the needs of the people of the Southwestern United States were developed by Sanchez to meet the challenges of a new era. He was a leading participant in the Committee of the United States bishops writing a letter on the Hispanic presence in the American Church. Pope John Paul II named him to the Pontifical Commission on Immigration Affairs. He also wrote what was considered to be the most comprehensive Pastoral Letter on HIV/AIDS at that time.

In the early 1990s, several women came forth, accusing the archbishop of having been sexually involved with them. Sanchez admitted to the affairs. He was also criticized for alleged failures to act on priests of the Archdiocese who were accused of abusing children.

=== Resignation and death ===
Sanchez resigned as archbishop of Santa Fe on April 6 1993. Later in 1993, Sanchez moved to the midwest and then specifically to Minnesota where he helped on a farm run by the Sisters of Mercy near Jackson, MN. In 1995, it was reported that he returned to New Mexico to visit family and, in 1997, he led a retreat for priests in Tucson, Arizona. Later, he moved back to the southwest to live with the retired Friars Minor of the region, not making any public appearances, until 2009 when he was transferred to a facility for patients suffering from Alzheimer's disease.

Sanchez died on January 20, 2012, at age 77. He is buried at Saint Francis of Assisi, Cathedral Basilica in Santa Fe.
