= Bernard T. Espelage =

American prelate (1892–1971)

The Most Reverend Bernard Theodore Espelage O.F.M.
- Bishop of Gallup; Titular Bishop of Penafiel
- Church: Roman Catholic Church
- See: Diocese of Gallup
- Successor: Jerome J. Hastrich
- Other post: Titular Bishop of Penafiel

Orders
- Ordination: May 16, 1918 by Joseph Chartrand
- Consecration: October 9, 1940 by John T. McNicholas

Personal details
- Born: February 16, 1892 Cincinnati, Ohio, US
- Died: February 19, 1971 (aged 79) Gallup, New Mexico, US
- Education: Catholic University of America
- Motto: Iter para tutum (Prepare a safe way)

Bernard Theodore Espelage, OFM (February 16, 1892—February 19, 1971) was an American Catholic prelate and member of the Order of Friars Minor who served Bishop of Gallup from 1940 until 1969.

== Biography ==
=== Early life ===
Bernard Espelage was born on February 16, 1892, in Cincinnati, Ohio. He was one of the six children of Clara and Bernard Espelage. His older brother, Sylvester Espelage, also entered the Franciscan order and became the vicar apostolic of the Diocese of Wuchang in 1930. Bernard received his early education at parochial schools and Franciscan seminaries, including St. Francis Seminary. He was invested with the Franciscan habit on August 15, 1910, and made solemn vows in 1914.

=== Priesthood ===
Espelage was ordained to the priesthood for the Franciscans in Oldenburg, Indiana, on May 16, 1918 by Bishop Joseph Chartrand. After his ordination, Espelage was assigned as a curate at a parish in Roswell, New Mexico. In 1919, he was named chancellor of the Archdiocese of Santa Fe, also serving as secretary to Albert Daeger, the bishop of that archdiocese. In 1926, Espelage earned a Licentiate of Canon Law from the Catholic University of America in Washington, D.C. Espelage served as rector of the Cathedral of St. Francis of Assisi from 1934 to 1939. The Franciscans then returned him to Oldenburg to serve as pastor of Holy Family Parish there.

=== Bishop of Gallup ===
On July 20, 1940, Pope Pius XII appointed Espelage as the first bishop of the newly formed Diocese of Gallup. He received his episcopal consecration at St. Monica Church in Cincinnati, Ohio, on October 9, 1940, from Archbishop John T. McNicholas, with Bishop Joseph H. Albers and Archbishop Joseph Ritter serving as co-consecrators. Espelage attended all four sessions of the Second Vatican Council in Rome between 1962 and 1965. During his 29-year-long tenure as bishop, the number of Catholics in his diocese increased from 30,000 to 79,260; priests went from 32 to 108; and parishes from 17 to 53.

=== Retirement and legacy ===
Espelage retired as bishop of Gallup on August 25, 1969; he was named titular bishop of Penafiel by Pope Paul VI on the same date. Espelage died in Gallup on February 19, 1971 at age 79.

Preceded by none	Bishop of Gallup; 1940—1969	Succeeded by Jerome J. Hastrich
