= St. Francis Seminary (Ohio) =

United States historic building

- U.S. National Register of Historic Places
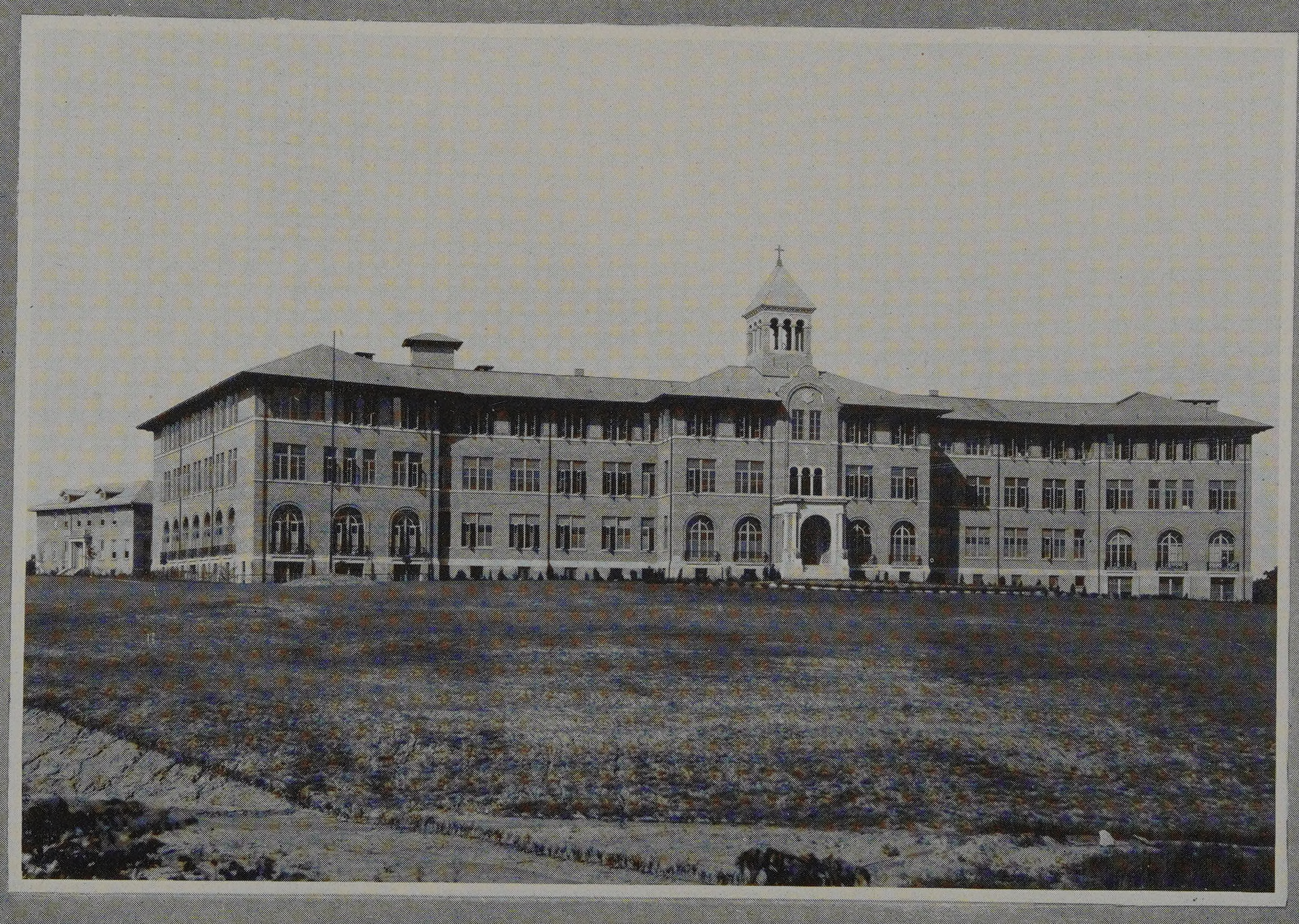
- The Mt. Healthy seminary building two years after its 1924 completion

- Location within Ohio Location within the United States
- Location: 10290 Mill Rd., Springfield Township, Hamilton County, Ohio
- Coordinates: 39°15′28″N 84°32′32″W
- Area: 128.4 acres (52.0 ha)
- Built: 1923
- Architect: Anthony Kunz, et al.
- Architectural style: Renaissance Revival
- NRHP reference No.: 99000275
- Added to NRHP: March 5, 1999

St. Francis Seminary was a Catholic seminary at 10290 Mill Road in Springfield Township in the northern suburbs of Cincinnati, Ohio. On March 5, 1999, the building was listed on the National Register of Historic Places. In 2000 it began to house a Franciscan retirement community named Mercy Franciscan at Winton Woods. Founded in 1858, St. Francis Seminary educated over 4500 students in its 122 years of operation before its 1980 closure, 650 of whom became priests and six of whom became bishops.

== History ==
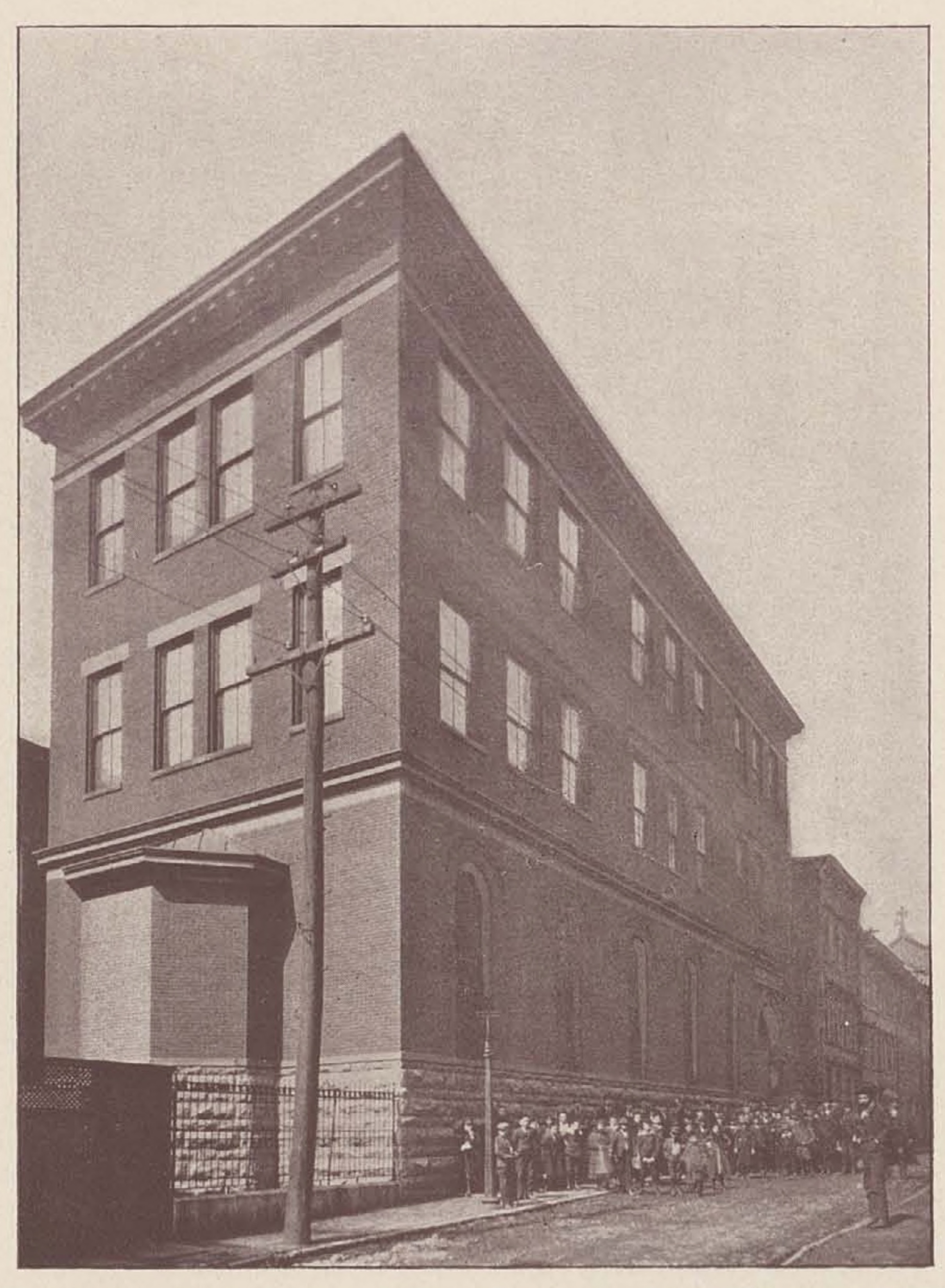
St. Francis Seminary was housed at this building across the street from St. Francis Seraph Church from 1868 to 1922.

=== Founding ===
Members of the Order of Friars Minor from Tyrol, Austria, arrived in Cincinnati in 1844, having been recruited by Archbishop John Purcell to serve German-speaking Catholics. In 1854, the European superiors attempted to recall the American friars, who refused. From that point, the Tyrolean Franciscans would send no more men to America, meaning the Americans needed to found their own seminaries and educate their own clergy.

In 1858, the friars opened St. Francis Gymnasium, as the institution was then known, at a residence at the intersection of Liberty and Vine, across the street from St. Francis Seraph Church in Over-the-Rhine. Thirty young men from throughout Cincinnati were formally enrolled under the leadership of Archangelus Gstir, the first rector.

The institution grew as the friars opened a new monastery in the area in 1860 and a parochial school in 1861, some classrooms of which were used by the seminarians. A new purpose-built school was completed at 1615 Republic Street seven years later. This was necessitated by growth in the enrollment of the parochial school, which needed more classrooms. By 1883, 69 alumni of the seminary had gone on to be ordained to the priesthood. While some secular clergy, such as Ferdinand Brossart and Nicholas Chrysostom Matz, the future bishops of Covington and Denver, were admitted to the institution, St. Francis eventually admitted exclusively those students seeking to enter the Franciscans.

Due to the urban and congested location of the Republic Street property, as well as growth in enrollment, the friars began to look for a more quiet and suburban location in the Cincinnati area, and acquired 127 acres of land north of Mt. Healthy in 1921. The Republic Street building continued to be owned by the Franciscans and was used for publishing religious literature before becoming a soup kitchen.

=== Mt. Healthy campus ===
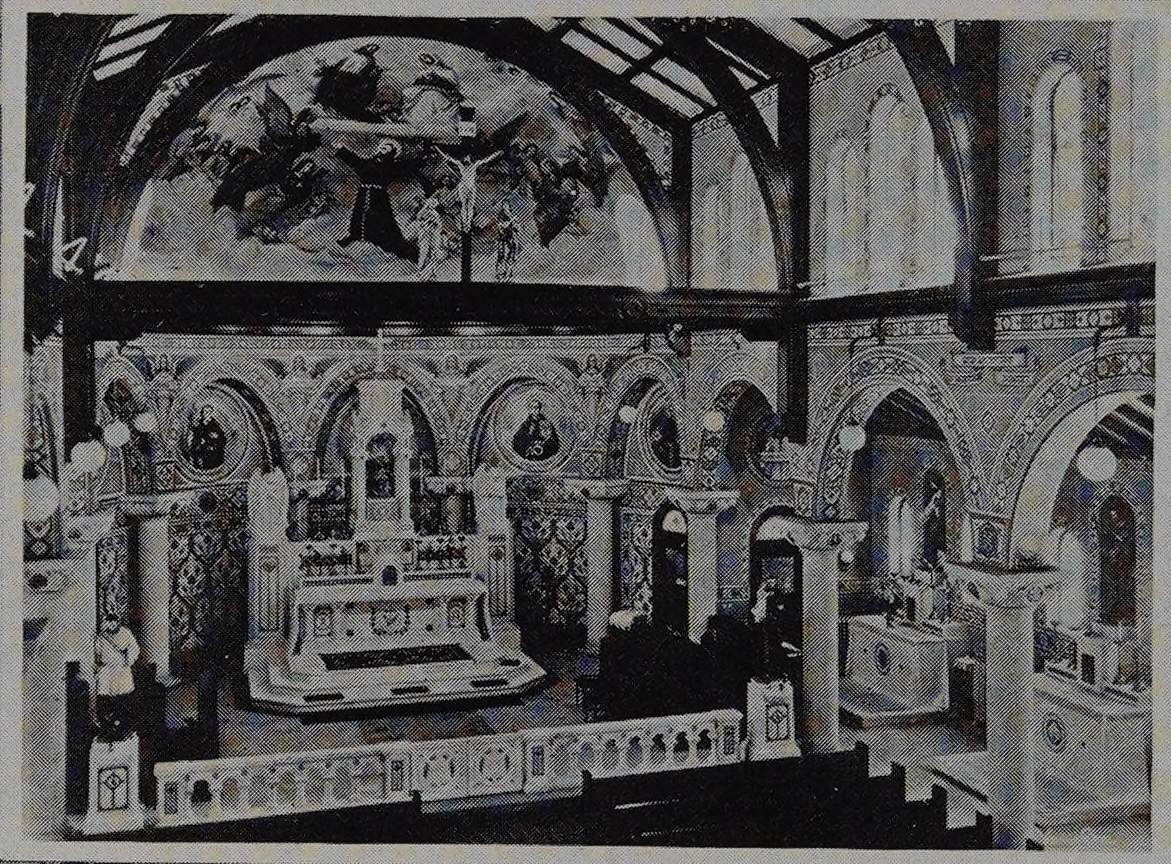
The main chapel at St. Francis in 1926

In August 1922, ground was broken on the current three-story Mission Revival building which cost $600,000 and was dedicated by Henry K. Moeller in 1924. It was designed by local architectural firm Anthony Kunz and Sons and was able to house 150 students on completion. Enrollment at the seminary peaked in 1965 with 230 students and in 1968, a gymnasium was built on the campus at a cost of $350,000. St. Francis also had an outdoor swimming pool, a soccer field, two tennis courts and four bowling alleys for students to use. By 1977, the drop-out rate of the school was 20% and enrollment had more than halved to 81 from the prior decade. The senior class of that same year, which had begun with 40 students, only had 14 remaining by their fourth year.

Actor Tom Cruise attended the seminary as a high school freshman in the late 1970s, later stating he attended on scholarship to help his mother save money, but never seriously considered the priesthood. He enrolled at St. Xavier High School in Louisville the following year before graduating from Glen Ridge High School in New Jersey in 1980.

Students participated in a variety of extracurriculars, including inter-seminary basketball games against schools such as Saints Peter and Paul Seminary, Covington Latin School, and Saint Gregory Seminary. One priest on faculty was a model-airplane enthusiast and the St. Francis campus continued to host radio-controlled aircraft exhibitions even after the closure of the school.

=== Closure and alternate use ===
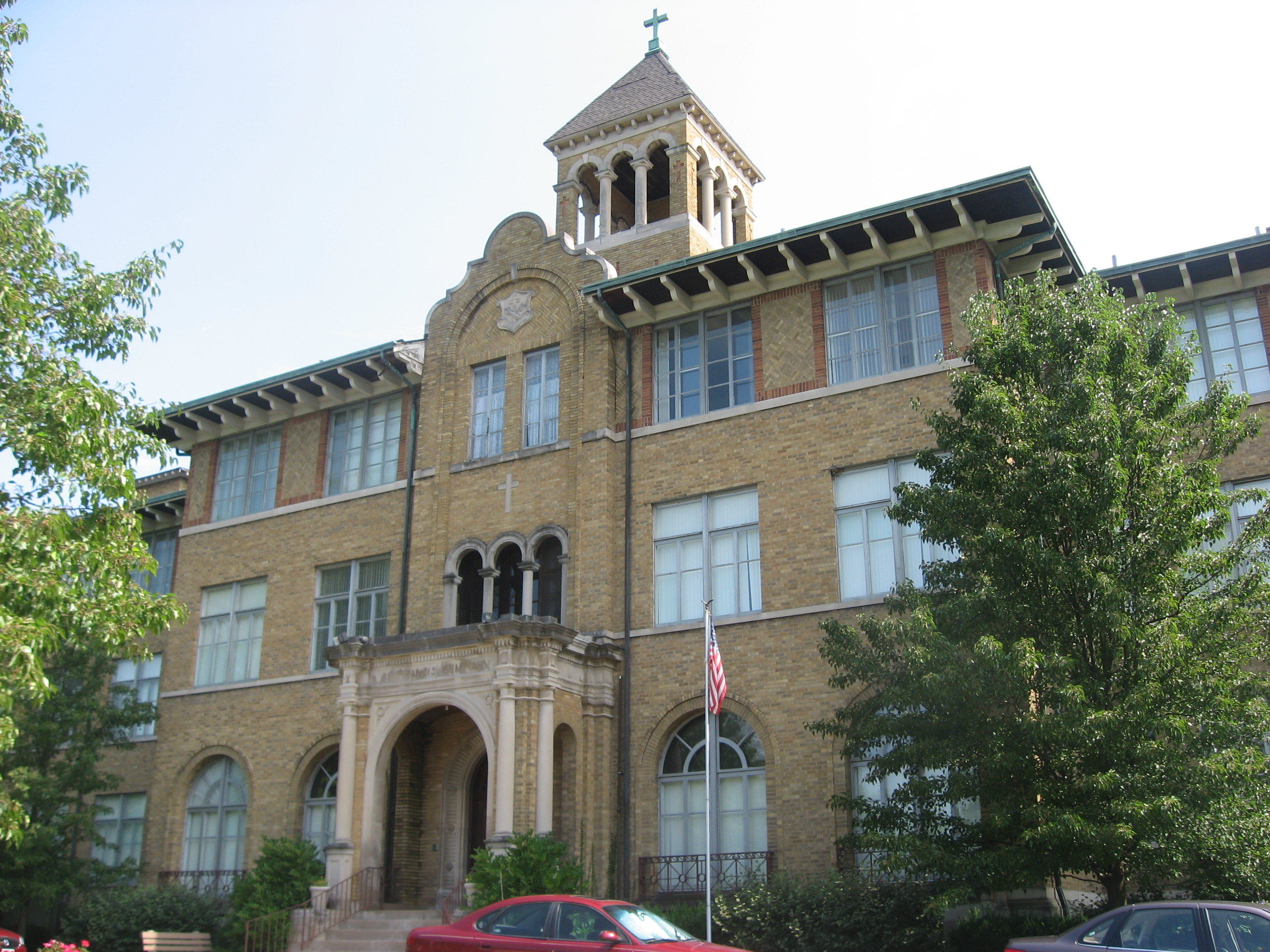
The former seminary in 2010

Due to declining enrollment, St. Francis Seminary was closed in 1980, only having 69 students enrolled that year. The facility was renamed the St. Francis Renewal Center following the closure of the high school, but continued to house the vocations office for the friars. During a 1981 trip to the United States, Mother Teresa made a private visit to St. Francis, speaking to a gathering of Franciscans assembled to celebrate the anniversary of the birth of Francis of Assisi. In 1999, the campus was renovated to provide 79 units of low-income senior living apartments. The Mercy Residence at Winton Woods was opened in 2000.

== Notable alumni ==
- Albert Daeger, OFM, Archbishop of the Archdiocese of Santa Fe
- Ferdinand Brossart, Bishop of the Diocese of Covington
- Nicholas Matz, Bishop of the then- Diocese of Denver
- Sylvester Espelage, OFM, Vicar apostolic of the Diocese of Wuchang
- Bernard T. Espelage, OFM, Bishop of the Diocese of Gallup
- Rembert Kowalski, OFM, Bishop of the Diocese of Wuchang
