= St. Teresa of Avila Catholic School =

St. Teresa of Avila Catholic School may refer to:

- St. Theresa of Avila Catholic School - Grants, New Mexico - List of schools of the Roman Catholic Diocese of Gallup
- St. Theresa of Avila Catholic School - Carson City, Nevada - Roman Catholic Diocese of Reno
- St. Theresa of Avila School - Cincinnati, Ohio - Roman Catholic Archdiocese of Cincinnati
