= St. Francis Seminary =

St. Francis Seminary may refer to:

- St. Francis Seminary (Ohio)
- St. Francis Seminary (Wisconsin)
