= Sylvester Espelage =

American Franciscan bishop (1877–1940)

The Most Reverend Sylvester Espelage OFM
- Vicar Apostolic of Wuchang; Titular bishop of Oreus
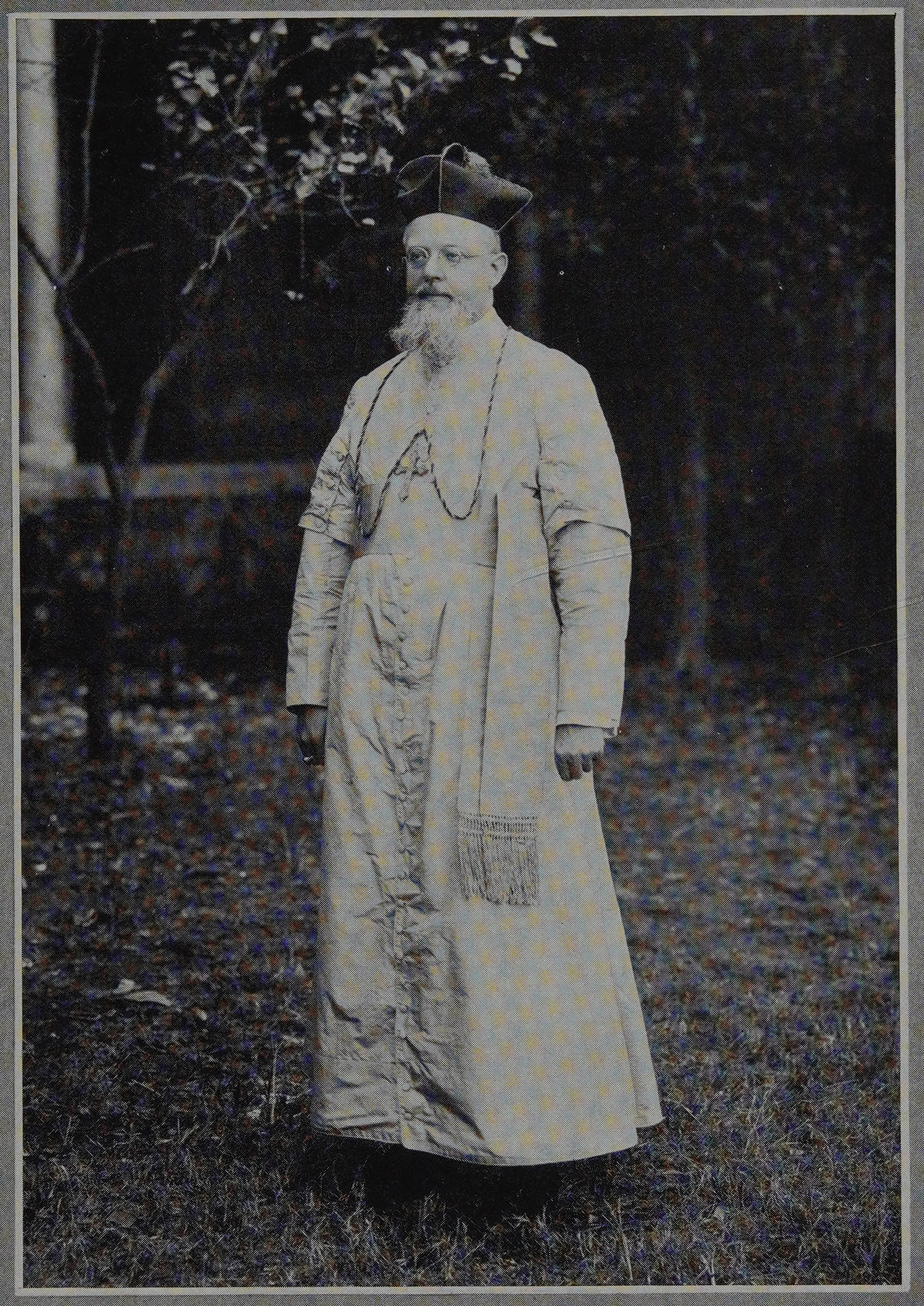
- Church: Catholic
- See: Oreus
- Previous posts: Professor, St. Francis Seminary; Curate, St. George Church; Prefect Apostolic of Wuchang

Orders
- Ordination: January 18, 1900 by Camillus Paul Maes
- Consecration: September 17, 1930 by Albert Daeger

Personal details
- Born: Joseph Espelage; March 24, 1877 Cincinnati, Ohio, U.S.
- Died: October 25, 1940 (aged 63) Wuchang, China
- Education: St. Francis Seminary

Sylvester Joseph Espelage OFM (March 24, 1877 – October 25, 1940) was an American bishop of the Catholic Church and a member of the Order of Friars Minor. He spent most of his career as a missionary in China, where he served as Prefect Apostolic of Wuchang from 1925 to 1930 and as its Vicar Apostolic from 1930 until his death in 1940.

== Biography ==
=== Early life and education ===
Joseph Espelage was born on March 24, 1877, in Fairmount, a suburb of Cincinnati, Ohio. He was one of six children born to Clara and Bernard Espelage. His younger brother, Bernard T. Espelage, also became a Franciscan friar and later served as the first Bishop of Gallup.

Espelage was baptized and received his First Communion at St. Bonaventure Church in Cincinnati, where he remained active throughout his youth. He entered St. Francis Seminary, where he discerned a religious vocation and joined the Order of Friars Minor on August 15, 1892, taking the religious name "Sylvester". He professed solemn vows on August 30, 1896.

=== Priesthood ===
Espelage was ordained to the priesthood on January 18, 1900, by Camillus Paul Maes. He celebrated his first Mass at St. Bonaventure Church and soon afterward began teaching at St. Francis Seminary. He later served at Franciscan missions in Kansas and as curate at St. Lawrence Church in Lafayette, Indiana, before being transferred in 1903 to St. George Church in Cincinnati.

=== Missionary work in China ===
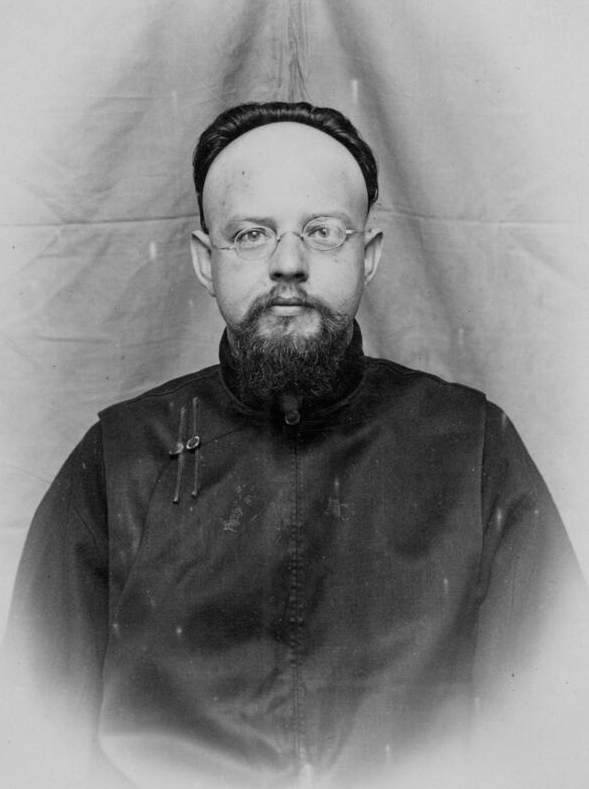
Espelage wearing traditional Chinese attire, circa 1907

In 1905, Espelage requested assignment to the Franciscan missions in Hubei Province, China, where he initially taught English and theology. Over time, he assumed responsibility for several new parishes and mission stations. Espelage adopted local dress and customs, including the traditional queue hairstyle, in order to better connect with the Chinese people before the 1911 Revolution.

Espelage helped establish schools and hospitals, and launched the missionary magazine Franciscans in China, which helped raise funds for the local mission. When the Prefecture Apostolic of Wuchang was created in 1924, Espelage was appointed its first prefect, overseeing both pastoral and charitable works.

=== Episcopacy and death ===
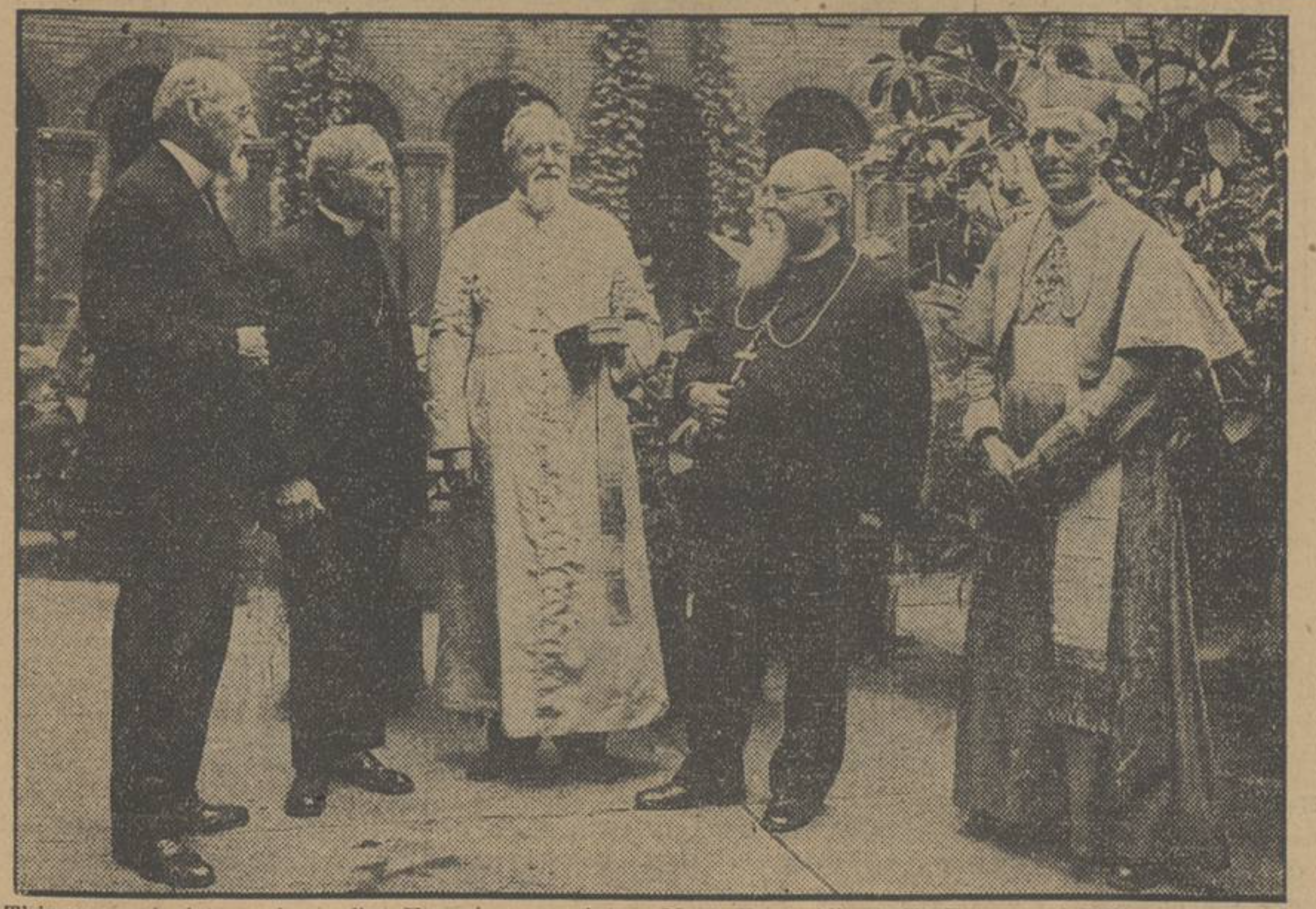
Espelage (third from left) with missionary bishops Noel Gubbels, Albert Daeger, Giovanni Mondaini, and Amadeus Bahlmann

In June 1930, the prefecture of Wuchang was elevated to an apostolic vicariate, and Espelage was appointed titular bishop of Oreus. His episcopal consecration took place on September 17, 1930, at the Cathedral Basilica of St. Peter in Chains in Cincinnati, with Albert Daeger as principal consecrator. Following his consecration, Espelage returned to China, where he oversaw extensive missionary and humanitarian activities. By 1935, the schools under his supervision educated over 2,000 students, and mission hospitals treated more than 1,600 patients annually.

Espelage remained in Hubei during the Second Sino-Japanese War despite widespread conflict and bombing raids in the region. He continued his pastoral duties until his death in Wuchang on October 25, 1940.
