= Jerome J. Hastrich =

American prelate

His Excellency, The Most Reverend Jerome Joseph Hastrich
- Bishop of Gallup titular bishop of Gurza
- Installed: August 25, 1969
- Term ended: March 31, 1990
- Predecessor: Bernard T. Espelage
- Successor: Donald Edmond Pelotte
- Other posts: Auxiliary Bishop of Madison (1963–1969); Titular Bishop of Gurza (1963–1995)

Orders
- Ordination: February 9, 1941 by William Richard Griffin
- Consecration: September 3, 1963 by William Patrick O’Connor

Personal details
- Born: Jerome Joseph Hastrich; November 13, 1914 Milwaukee, Wisconsin, US
- Died: May 12, 1995 (aged 80) Gallup, New Mexico, US
- Denomination: Catholic Church

Jerome Joseph Hastrich (November 13, 1914 – May 12, 1995) was an American Catholic prelate who served as Bishop of Gallup from 1969 to 1990. He previously served as an auxiliary bishop for the Diocese of Madison from 1963 to 1969.

== Biography ==
=== Early life ===
Jerome Hastrich was born on November 13, 1914, in Milwaukee, Wisconsin. He was ordained to the priesthood at St. Francis Seminary in St. Francis, Wisconsin, by Bishop William Richard Griffin on February 9, 1941, for the Archdiocese of Milwaukee.On December 22, 1945, Hastrich was incardinated into the newly created Diocese of Madison.

=== Auxiliary Bishop of Madison ===
On July 25, 1963, Pope Paul VI appointed Hastrich as an auxiliary bishop of Madison and titular bishop of Gurza. He was consecrated bishop at Saint Raphael's Cathedral in Madison, Wisconsin, by Bishop William Patrick O’Connor on September 3, 1963.

=== Bishop of Gallup ===
On August 25, 1969, Paul VI appointed Hastrich as bishop of Gallup. On March 31, 1990, Pope John Paul II accepted Hastrich's resignation as bishop of Gallup. Jerome Hastrich died in Gallup on May 12, 1995.

== Notes ==
Catholic Church titles
Preceded by Bernard T. Espelage	Bishop of Gallup; 1969–1990	Succeeded by Donald Edmond Pelotte
Preceded by –	Auxiliary Bishop of Madison; 1963–1969	Succeeded by –
