= Sacred Heart Cathedral (Gallup, New Mexico) =

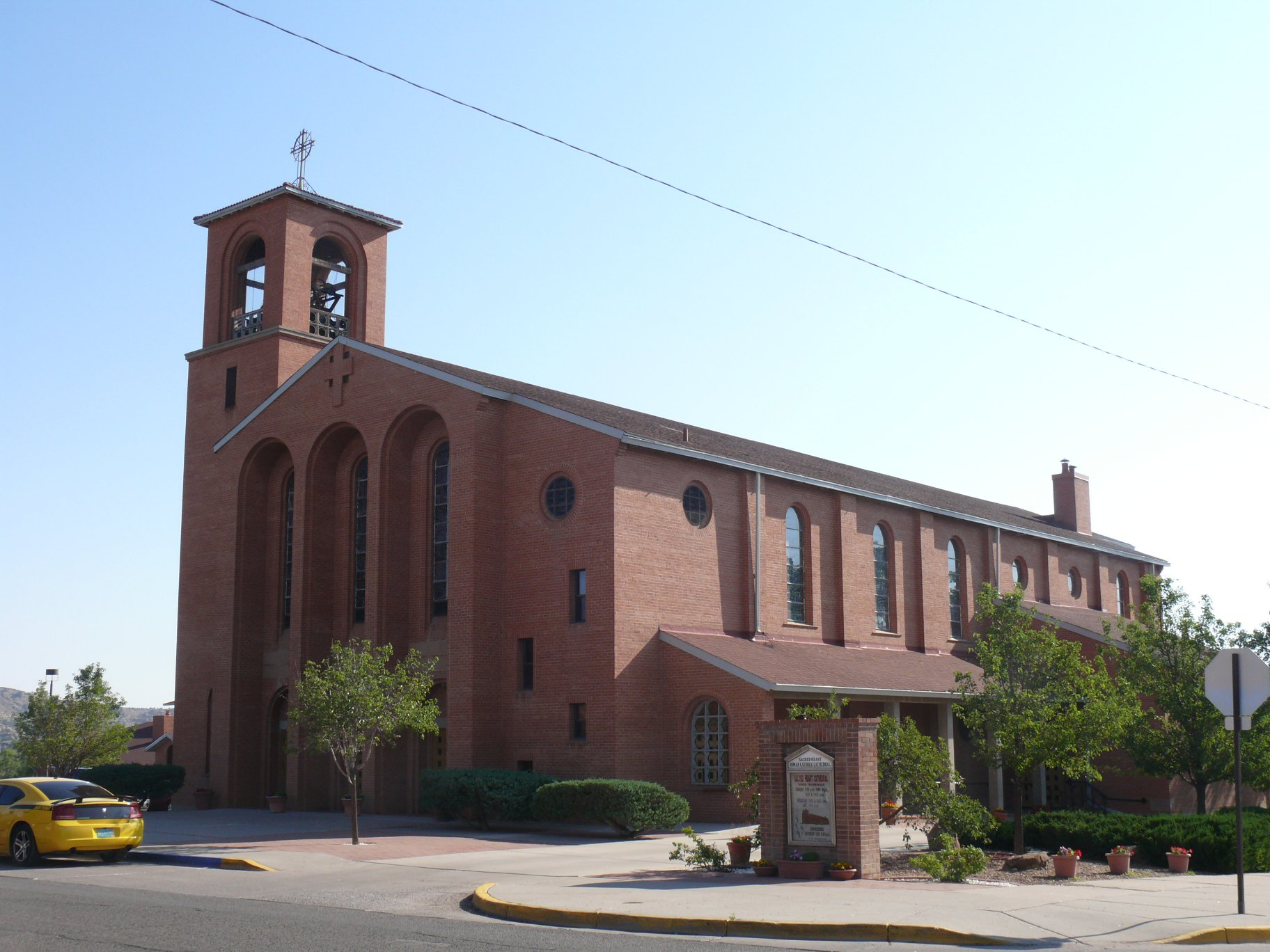
- The cathedral in 2013

- Location in New Mexico Sacred Heart Cathedral (the United States)
- 35°31′31″N 108°44′09″W
- Location: 415 East Green Ave. Gallup, New Mexico
- Country: United States
- Denomination: Roman Catholic
- Website: sacredheartgallup.org

History
- Status: Cathedral
- Dedication: Sacred Heart of Jesus

Architecture
- Completed: 1955

Specifications
- Materials: Brick

Administration
- Diocese: Gallup

Clergy
- Bishop: Most Rev. James S. Wall
- Rector: Rev. Mitchell A. Brown

Sacred Heart Cathedral is a cathedral church located at 415 East Green Avenue in Gallup, New Mexico, in the United States. It is the seat of the Roman Catholic Diocese of Gallup.

== History ==
=== Sacred Heart Church ===
The opening of coal mines around Gallup in the late 19th century drew many Catholic immigrants to Gallup. At that time, the area was part of the Archdiocese of Santa Fe. The archdiocese in 1893 sent the priest George Julliard to Gallup in 1893 to minister to the Catholic population there. He erected the Sacred Heart church in 1899.

The Sacred Heart Church collapsed in 1916. The parish built a new structure on Hill Street between 4th and 5th Streets in 1917.

=== Sacred Heart Cathedral ===
In 1939, Pope Pius XII established the Diocese of Gallup and designated Sacred Heart Church as Sacred Heart Cathedral The present cathedral dates from 1955 and replaced the 1917 sanctuary at a cost of $500,000. Franciscan Friars served the parish until July 1, 1981, when the first diocesan priest, Alfred Tachias, became pastor and cathedral rector. In 2022, the diocese replaced the roof on the cathedral.

In 2026, the diocese began planning to build a new school building for Sacred Heart School on the cathedral campus. The school is currently located on an off-site property that the diocese wants to sell. The plan was to use the sale proceeds to construct the new school.

== Gallery of pictures ==
Cathedral images

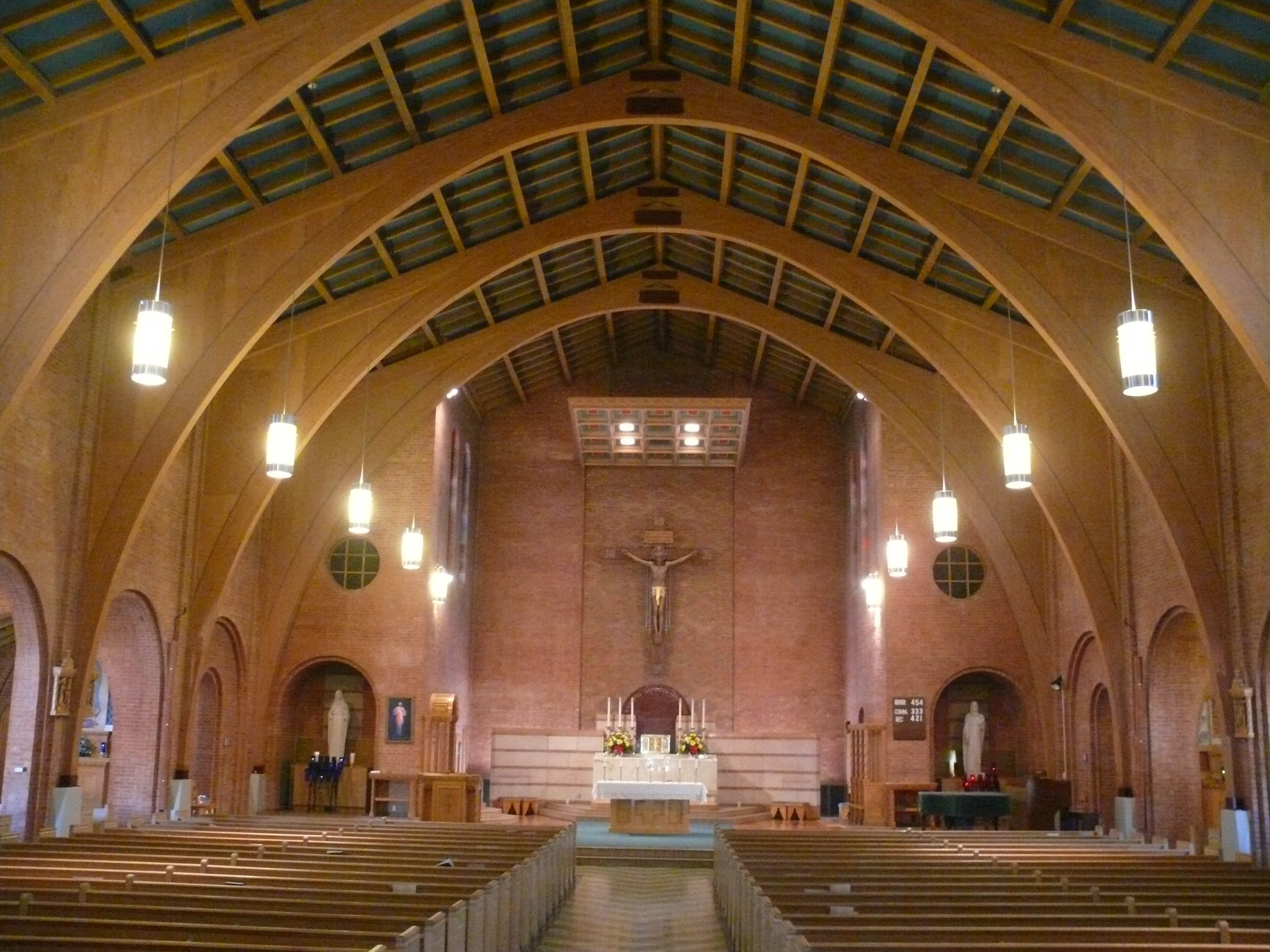
Nave (2013)

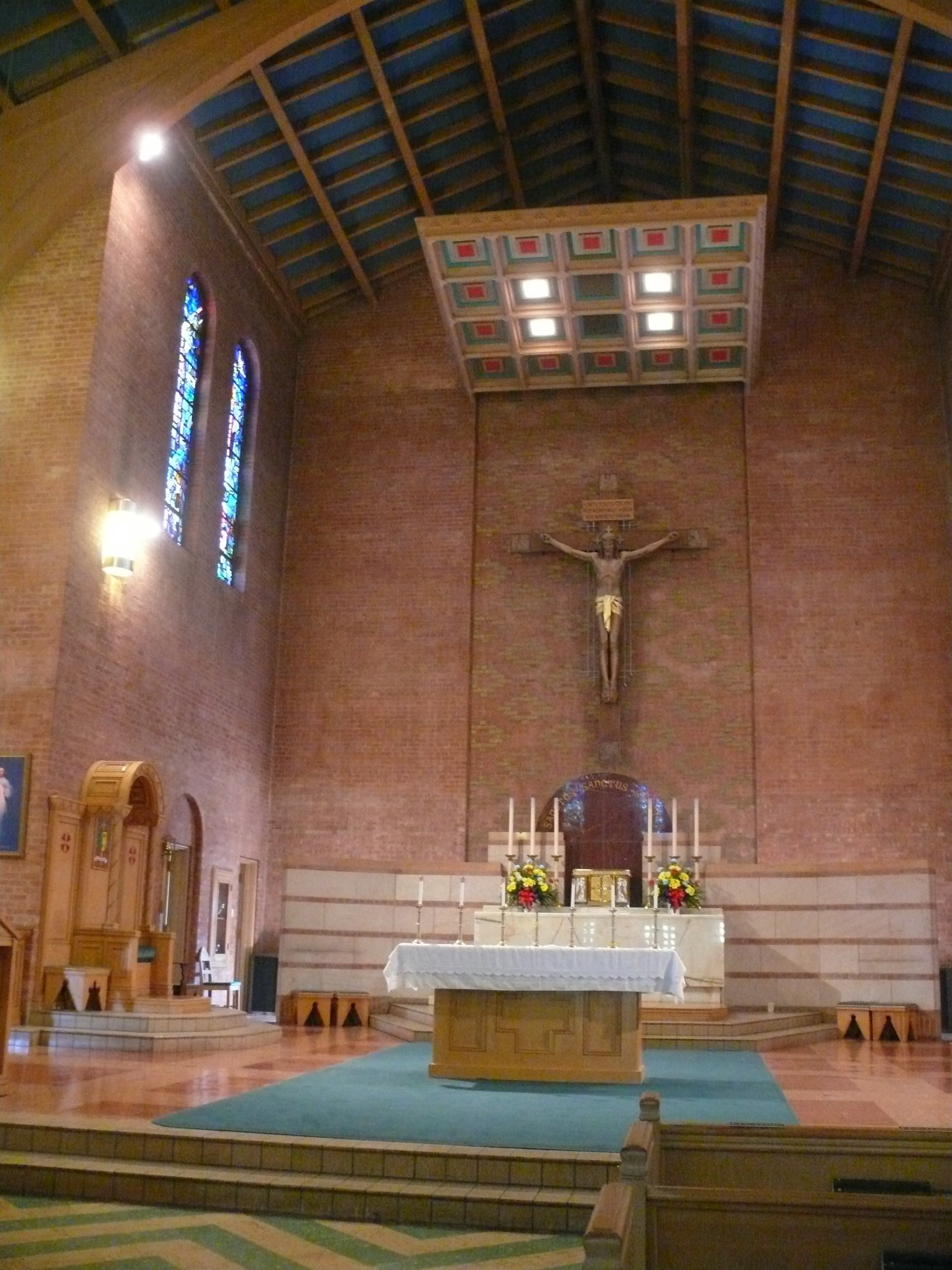
Altar (2013)

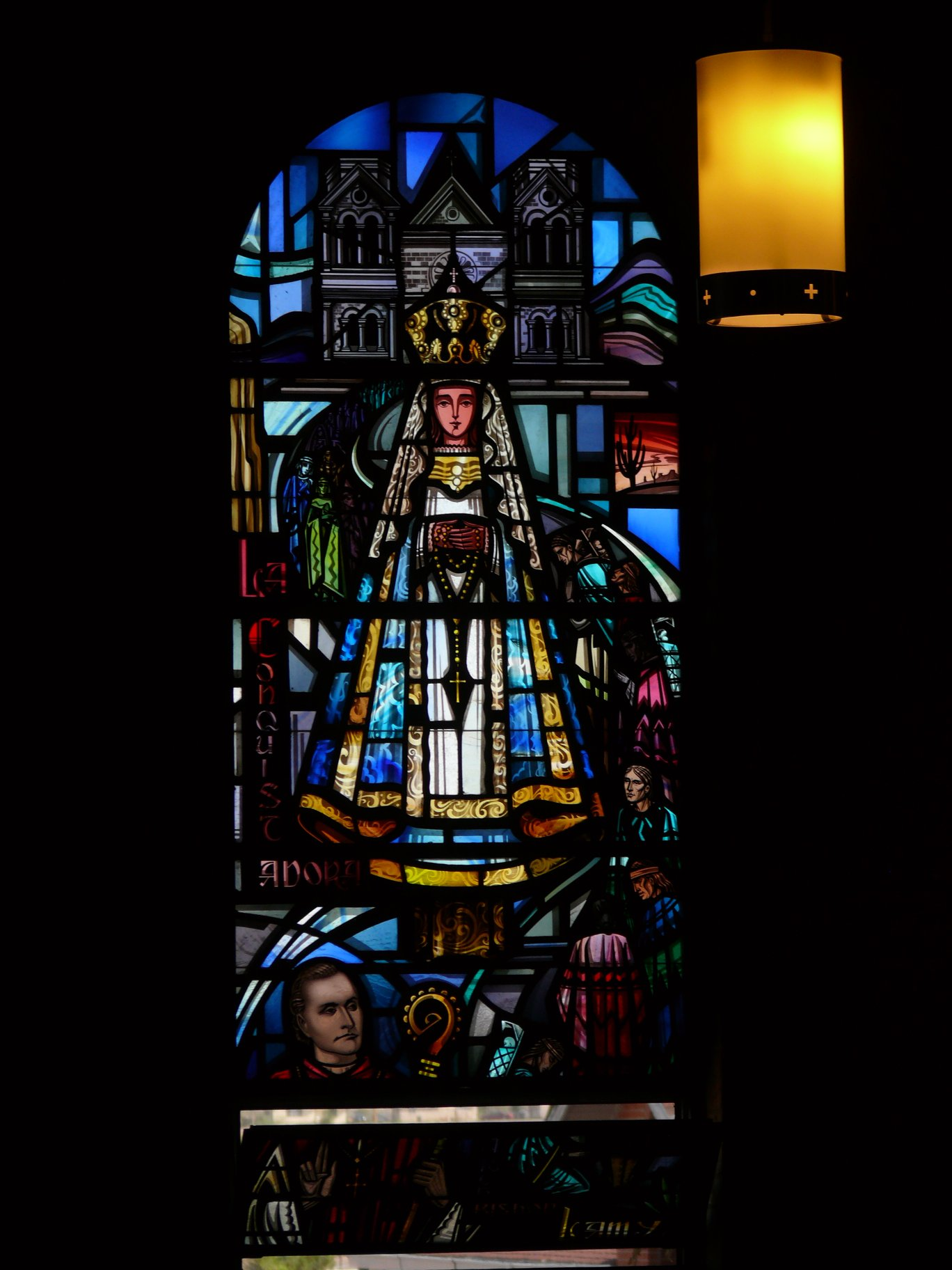
Virgin Mary stained glass window (2013)

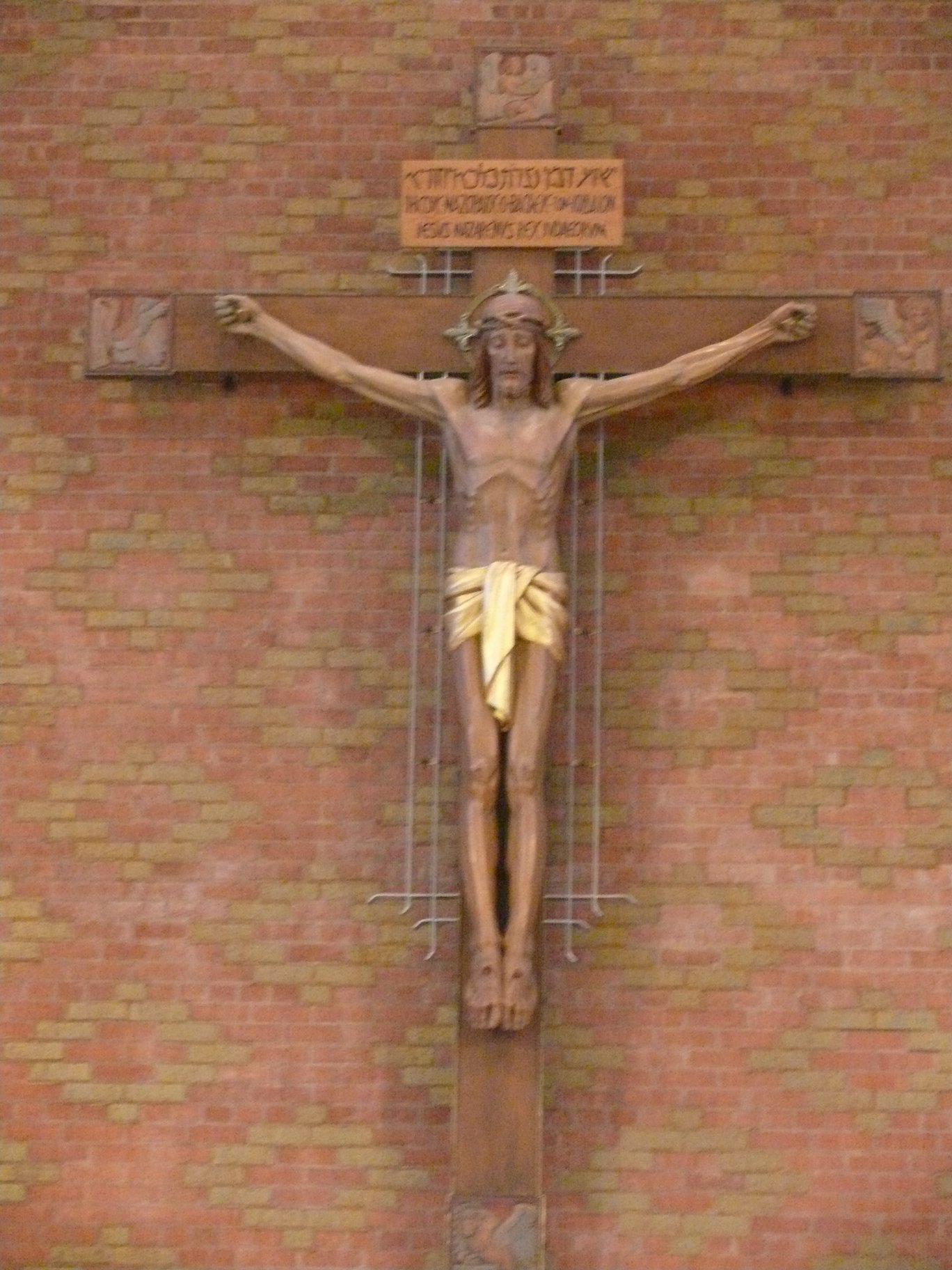
Crucifix (2013)

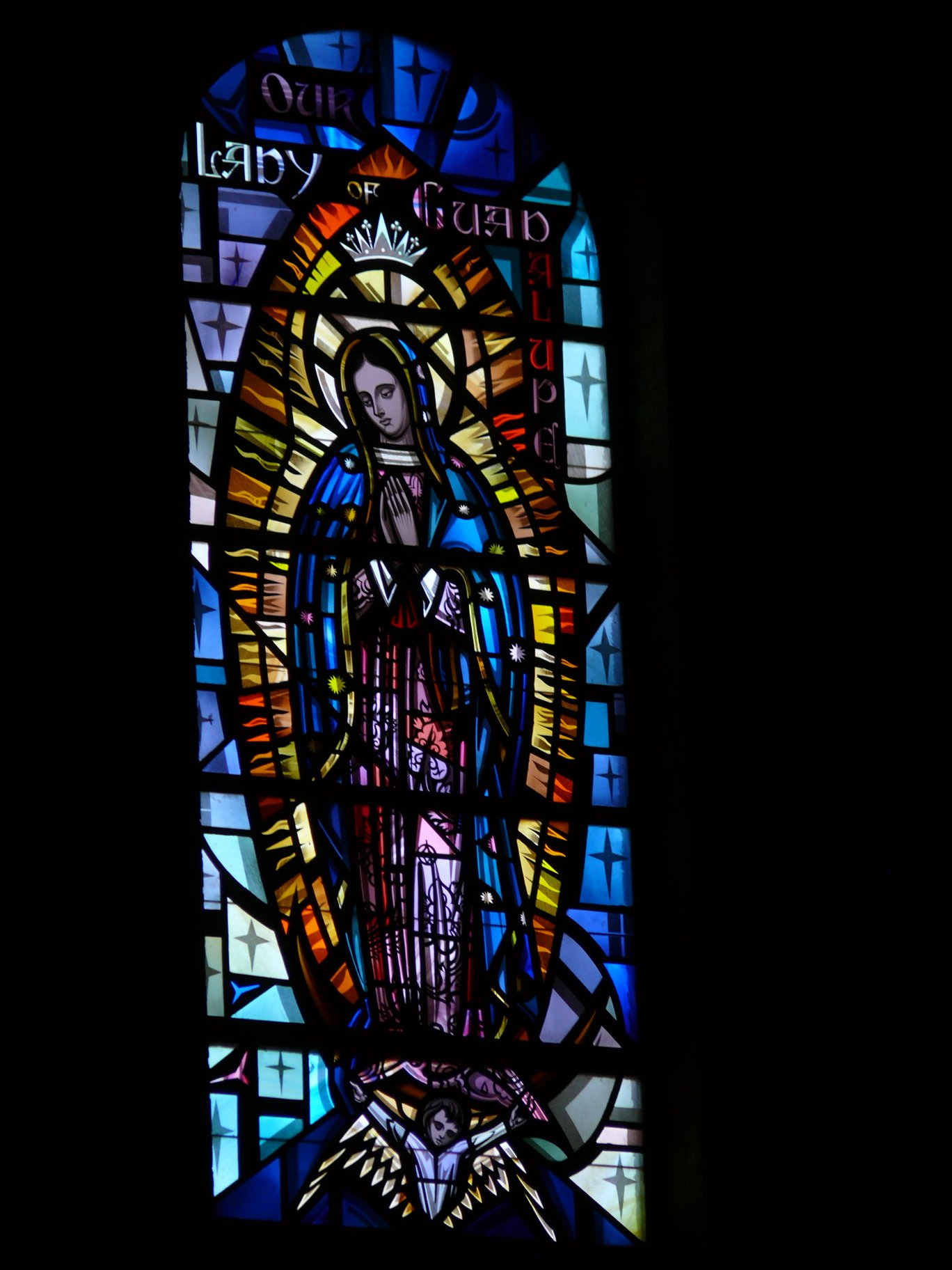
Stained glass window (2013)

== See also ==
- List of Catholic cathedrals in the United States
- List of cathedrals in the United States
