= Sacred Heart Catholic School (Gallup, New Mexico) =

Location
- 555 S. Woodrow Drive; Gallup, (McKinley County), New Mexico 87301; United States; 35°31′7″N 108°44′35″W

Information
- Type: Private School Coeducational
- Religious affiliation: Roman Catholic
- Established: 1912
- Closed: High school: 2013
- Grades: PreK–8 (since 2013); K-12 (until 1978, 1997-2013)
- Colors: Green, Black and White
- Team name: Panthers
- Accreditation: North Central Association of Colleges and Schools
- Athletic Director: Victoria Joe
- Website: shcsgallup.org

Sacred Heart Catholic School, formerly Gallup Catholic School (GCS), is a private, Roman Catholic PreK-8 school in Gallup, New Mexico. It is located in the Roman Catholic Diocese of Gallup. The school colors are green, black, and white.

== History ==
Established in 1912, it was originally known as the Sacred Heart School. Previously, it was operated by the diocese and known as the Sacred Heart Cathedral Elementary and High School. In 1978 the high school division stopped operations. In 1991 it became the Gallup Catholic School and was no longer controlled by the diocese. In May 1997 a new graduating class of the re-established high school graduated. In 1997 the school had a total of 262 students in all grades.

In 2001 Saint Bonaventure Indian School in Thoreau ended its high school program, with its board of directors funding scholarships for students to attend high school classes at Gallup Catholic.

Circa 2008 there were 130 enrolled pupils in the high school.

By 2012 the diocese once again had control of the school. By 2013 high school enrollment was down to 33. Due to declining enrollment, the high school was closed in 2013. That year, the remaining component, the elementary school, began changing its name back to Sacred Heart.

The school moved to a smaller building in 2021.
