= Disappearance of Anthonette Cayedito =

Unsolved disappearance in New Mexico, US

Coordinates: 35.521958°N 108.758924°W

Anthonette Cayedito
- Born: Anthonette Christine Cayedito; December 25, 1976; Gallup, New Mexico, U.S.
- Disappeared: April 6, 1986 (aged 9); Gallup, New Mexico, U.S.
- Status: Missing for 40 years and 6 months

Anthonette Christine Cayedito /əntoʊnɛt kaɪeɪdɪtoʊ/ (born December 25, 1976) is a Native American girl who disappeared from her home in Gallup, New Mexico, on April 6, 1986. Authorities found no evidence following an extensive three-day search, but suspected Cayedito had been abducted and were treating her disappearance as foul play. A year after her disappearance, a girl claiming to be Cayedito phoned the Gallup Police Department, stated her name multiple times and said she was in Albuquerque, before an unknown adult yelled "Who said you could use the phone?" followed by the girl screaming. The phone call was disconnected and could not be traced; Cayedito's mother Penny listened to the 40-second tape recording repeatedly and said the caller was her daughter.

Multiple alleged sightings of Cayedito were reported between 1986 and 1991; police also received hundreds of tips from the general public, but none have proved useful to the investigation. The disappearance was featured on a 1992 episode of Unsolved Mysteries, which brought renewed attention to the case, but no viable leads. Penny died in 1999 from liver cirrhosis and cardiac issues. Some detectives believe Penny knew who had abducted her daughter and had more intimate knowledge of the disappearance, citing a failed polygraph test and a confession to the Federal Bureau of Investigation (FBI), but no charges were ever filed. Although law enforcement officials believe her to be deceased, Cayedito is still officially listed as a missing person and her case remains open.

== Background ==
Anthonette Christine Cayedito was born on December 25, 1976, to Theresa "Penny" Cayedito, of the Navajo Nation, and Larry Estrada, a carpenter. She is of "Navajo and Italian descent". After her parents' separation, Cayedito and her younger half-sisters, Wendy and Senida "Sadie" Montoya, were raised by their mother in Gallup, New Mexico.

Family members described Cayedito as being level-headed, wise beyond her years, scholastically dedicated, friendly, caring, and dependable. By the time she was six years old, she was cooking for her sisters, ironed their clothes for the week and played a vital role in caring for them. After her disappearance, her father remarked: "She was 9 going on 15." Cayedito was known by her peers for her displayed concern for the well-being of others, particularly if they were downcast or otherwise in need. Her youngest sister later described Cayedito as having a "caregiver's heart". Her favorite color was purple, and she enjoyed listening to the music of Michael Jackson and Ronnie Milsap, and she was nicknamed "Squirrel".

Cayedito was a fourth-grade student at Lincoln Elementary School, where she was an attentive, above-average student who displayed a flair for sports and physical activities, winning the Presidential Fitness Award in her fourth year. Outside of school, she also displayed a strong interest in her weekly Bible studies and was devoted to her religious faith. At the time of her disappearance, she was living with her mother and sisters at 204 Arnold Circle #9 in Gallup.

== Disappearance ==
Anthonette Cayedito disappeared from her home in the early morning hours of Sunday, April 6, 1986. Her mother, Penny, had been out with friends at a local bar the previous night and Anthonette, along with her younger sisters Wendy and Sadie, were at home with a babysitter. Penny returned around midnight and sent the babysitter home; she last saw Anthonette at about 3 a.m. that morning. When Penny awoke at 7 a.m. to prepare the girls for Bible school, she realized Anthonette was not in her bedroom. After inquiring with neighbors, she telephoned the police.

A three-day search was conducted by state police, which yielded no new clues or evidence. Police and volunteers used three- and four-wheel drive vehicles, horses and motorcycles to scour areas in and around southwest Gallup, but only located existing tracks. State police sergeant Bill Johnson stated: "If there were any clues, they were trampled. Everywhere you turn, somebody's been there already." Two search dogs were also unable to pick up Cayedito's scent. Cayedito's clothing and belongings were not taken from the home and there was no evidence consistent with a forced entry or a struggle at the front door. Neighbors told police that a brown van or truck had arrived at the residence at about 3 a.m. the morning of Cayedito's disappearance. Police later learned that a "number of people had been in and out of the Cayedito home" prior to her disappearance.

Police did not conduct an official search of the Cayedito home until four days after the child's disappearance. Penny told detectives that a man by the name of Emiliano Gardella (nicknamed "Emo") had given flowers to Anthonette three times in the days leading up to her disappearance, only mentioning it after a family member brought it up during the police search. A man named Ron Perry, a friend of Penny, told detectives that around 3:30 a.m., he knocked on the door and a bedroom window of the Cayedito home. He claimed he was checking on Penny after they got into an argument at the bar. Perry said he left and spent the night at the home of a friend who lived down the street. The homeowner corroborated Perry's account.

Police believed Cayedito was abducted and were treating her disappearance as foul play. Detectives questioned relatives, friends, and neighbors living within a three-block radius of the Cayedito house and conducted more than three dozen interviews with people who knew Cayedito. Deputy chief of police John Allen noted that a neighbor said it "wasn't unusual for Penny to have people visit all hours of the night." Detective Amos Hinshaw stated: "My gut feeling is that some family members may not be telling us all they know."

== Developments ==
On the afternoon of April 12, 1987, one year after the disappearance, the Gallup Police Department received a frantic phone call. The caller was a young girl who claimed to be Cayedito, saying that she was in Albuquerque. An angry adult voice was heard shouting, "Who said you could use the phone?!" followed by the girl screaming and the sounds of a scuffle, after which the phone call was cut off. The 40-second call was automatically recorded on tape. Penny listened to the recording repeatedly and stated, "It was her voice. I would know my baby's voice anywhere." She knew the voice to be her daughter's by the way she pronounced her surname and by the sound of her screaming, but did not recognize the adult's voice. Detective Marty Esquibel said that the call was too short to be traced, which meant police were unable to determine where the call originated from. In January 1989, the call was broadcast on radio for the first time and led to a number of new leads in the case.

Three years after Cayedito's disappearance, her 25-year-old disabled aunt, Louisa Estrada (sister to Larry Estrada), disappeared on September 5, 1989, from Gallup. Louisa was found alive in Ciudad Juárez, Mexico, a month later and returned home. Over the years there have been questions over potential connections between the two cases.

Five years after the disappearance, Wendy—now aged 10—gave her account of the disappearance for the first time. She told detectives that there was a second knock on the door, which Cayedito, still awake, answered. When she asked who it was, the knocker identified himself as "Uncle Joe". When she opened the door, she was grabbed by two men. Kicking and screaming, "Let me go! Let me go!" the men forced her into a brown van. Wendy did not recognize the men as she did not get a look at their faces. She stated that she had not said anything at the time owing to a fear of upsetting her mother, and of not being believed. Her sister Sadie has stated that she is not sure a second knock happened.

Penny never mentioned a second knock at the door until 1994, when she was interviewed by the Federal Bureau of Investigation (FBI). "I told her (Anthonette) to go ahead and answer it," she told federal agents. "I laid there for a period of time, maybe thirty minutes, and Anthonette never came back. I got up to see where she was but I couldn't find her." Penny claimed that the knock happened between 3:30 a.m. and 4:30 a.m., and that it was "just getting light" when she got up thirty minutes later. This account differed significantly from her initial statement of waking up at 7:00 a.m. and finding that her daughter was missing.

Later in 1994, Penny confessed to the FBI that she had been involved in Cayedito's abduction, asking "What if me and Emo did this, would we both go to prison?" Penny stated that she and "Emo" got together on a plan prior to the disappearance. Penny stated she wanted to know where the abduction would occur, but was told it was better that she did not know. She admitted to knowing who was coming to take her daughter, as well as having told her to open the door. Despite this confession, and the FBI's strong belief that Penny was involved in the abduction, she was never charged with Cayedito's disappearance. In a 2010 interview with the Gallup Herald, Detective Marty Esquibel said, "I'm pretty confident Penny had knowledge of who took Anthonette based on her failing a polygraph test administered by the FBI."

=== Theories ===
Police interviewed an uncle who was married to Penny's sister, but declined to name him a suspect. Investigators believe Cayedito may be deceased and that Penny Cayedito allowed her to be taken by "Emo", although her whereabouts remain unknown as of 2026. Theories range from her being either a victim of homicide or possibly human trafficking. The police stated that in 2016 they believed Penny may have had more information than she had given police concerning her daughter's disappearance, citing a failed lie detector test and confession.

== Alleged sightings ==
External image
- Age progression of Cayedito to age 42

On April 8, 1986, a witness reported he believed he had seen Cayedito in San Antonio. He recalled seeing a Spanish-looking girl in a long pink dress with a blonde-haired woman on the side of the road. It is unknown whether the girl was Cayedito.

On April 19, 1986, a woman claimed to have seen a brown truck at a Thriftway Gas Station. As the truck passed, the woman believed she could hear a little voice screaming "Help me, help me". The witness believed it could have been Cayedito.

On June 30, 1986, a witness claimed he had seen Cayedito at a bus depot in El Paso, Texas, in the presence of two Hispanic men. He claimed the girl was wearing a pink dress (very similar to an earlier eyewitness account), white shoes, and had a noticeable mark on her cheek, similar to one Cayedito had.

On November 4, 1989, the Independent reported that a Missouri man claimed he saw Cayedito a week prior at a truck stop off Interstate 70 in Waynesfield and reported the encounter to police. He had recognized her from missing persons posters and said that she was alone, wearing "torn jeans, a dirty white T-shirt, a red bandanna and a large watch". The witness also stated that the girl had acted "like she was afraid of people" and "like she had been punished for something".

Four years later, in 1991, a waitress at a restaurant in Carson City, Nevada, encountered a teenage girl matching Cayedito's description in the company of an unkempt couple. The girl continuously knocked her utensils to the floor, seemingly attempting to get the waitress's attention. According to the waitress, the girl grabbed her hand and squeezed it firmly each time the waitress handed back the utensils. After they left, the waitress cleaned their table and found a napkin under the plate the girl had been eating from. It contained two brief messages: "Help me" and "Call the police", written on it.

== Aftermath ==
Penny Cayedito died on April 18, 1999, in Tucson, Arizona, from a combination of liver cirrhosis and cardiac issues, aged 46. The FBI wanted to interview Penny on her deathbed, but she had died prior to their arrival. Anthony Montoya died on August 17, 2012.

In an interview with the Albuquerque Journal in 2016, Wendy Montoya, Cayedito's youngest sister, spoke of the struggles that she and her family went through: "It just broke my whole family up. It was a very dark and dysfunctional time." Montoya revealed that she and her mother could barely talk about Cayedito without crying or getting intoxicated with drugs and alcohol. "That was how we coped with the pain, to numb it, not to forget about it but to put it on the shelf, you know?" The trauma of losing her sister led Montoya into a life of drug addiction, alcoholism, gang affiliation, and acquiring a criminal record throughout her adolescence into her young adulthood. Her lifestyle caused her to lose custody of her children. Around 2007, however, Montoya successfully turned her life around. "I went into rehab. I struggled to get my kids back, struggled to get away from the old person I was, to break the cycle I was raised up in, and to get far away from here. And I did it." She further added that if she could not find her sister, she could at least find herself.

As of 2016, Wendy is reported to reside in Bakersfield, California. She admits that although her memories of her sister are vague, the loss still haunts her and she misses her to this day. For Wendy, Cayedito is indelibly frozen in time "at age 9, a little girl with a jumble of teeth, soft brown eyes and a caregiver's heart." Montoya still maintains hope that her sister is somewhere out there, and there is still time to discover the truth of what became of her: "I'm not going to accept that she's dead. I need proof."

On April 6, 2021, the 35th anniversary of Cayedito's disappearance, the FBI announced renewed search efforts for Cayedito and asked for assistance from the general public. Special agent in charge Eric Brown Sr. stated: "We are asking anyone who might have information about this case to come forward now and help us find Anthonette."

In June 2022, Cayedito's other sister, Sadie Acevedo, was interviewed by KOAT-TV. She stated, "It's hard not knowing the point of no closure. What happened? Where did she go?" In the interview, Acevedo also publicly conveyed a message to her missing sister, "She's safe. She has a family that loves her. She has sisters. We haven't given up. We all wonder and often think about Anthonette and what's she doing. Does she have kids? What kind of life is she living?"

== Media depictions ==
Cayedito's disappearance was featured on an episode of Unsolved Mysteries. The episode aired on December 16, 1992, nine days before what would have been Cayedito's sixteenth birthday. The broadcast led to police receiving 120 calls from viewers by March 1993, but none proved useful to the investigation.

== Unidentified persons exclusions ==
According to the National Missing and Unidentified Persons System, the following decedents were ruled out as being the remains of Cayedito.

Name	Location	Date	Age	Cause of death	Circumstances
Bernalillo County Jane Doe	Albuquerque, New Mexico	May 2, 1996	14–19	Undetermined	Remains of an unidentified female were found near 98th and Tower Road in Albuquerque, NM. The decedent was wrapped in dark green or black plastic bags (six in all). The top of the outer bag was tied with a green electrical wire with a copper colored core. The bottom of the bag was tied about the legs with a white 1/4" diameter rope. There were multiple fractures of the left skull and left lower leg present. She was likely a mixture of white, Hispanic, and Native American.

== See also ==
- List of people who disappeared
- Missing and murdered Indigenous women
