= James S. Wall =

American Catholic bishop (born 1964)

His Excellency, The Most Reverend James Sean Wall
- Bishop of Gallup
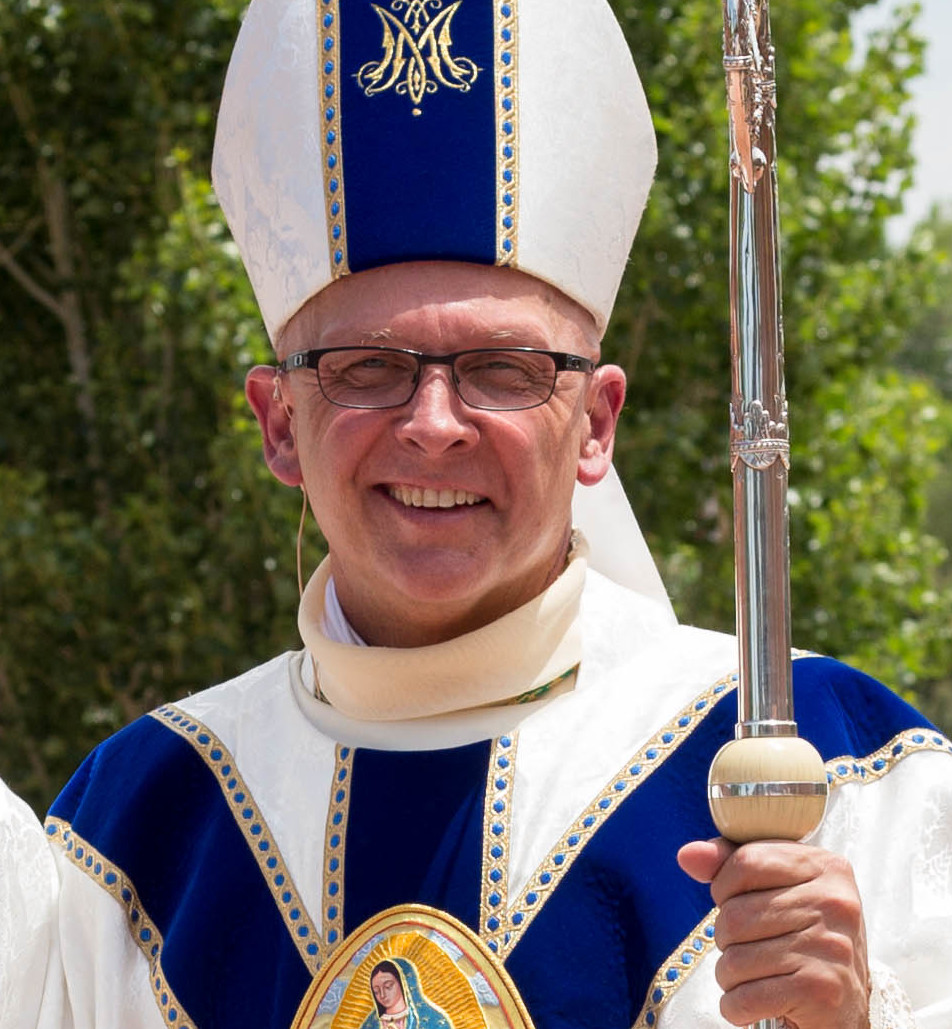
- Wall in 2018
- Church: Roman Catholic Church
- Archdiocese: Santa Fe
- Diocese: Gallup
- Appointed: February 5, 2009
- Installed: April 23, 2009
- Predecessor: Donald Edmond Pelotte

Orders
- Ordination: June 6, 1998 by Thomas J. O'Brien
- Consecration: April 23, 2009 by Michael Sheehan, Thomas Olmsted, and Edward William Clark

Personal details
- Born: October 11, 1964 (age 62) Ganado, Arizona, Navajo Nation, United States
- Education: Arizona State University (BA); St. John's Seminary (MDiv)
- Motto: Estote factores verbi (Be doers of the word)

Styles of James Sean Wall
- Reference style: His Excellency; The Most Reverend
- Spoken style: Your Excellency
- Religious style: Bishop

James Sean Wall (born October 11, 1964) is an American Catholic prelate who has served as Bishop of Gallup since 2009.

== Biography ==
=== Early life and education ===
James Wall was born on October 11, 1964, in Ganado, Arizona, in the Navajo Nation to James and Joan (née Hamilton) Wall. His parents converted to Catholicism after coming into contact with two Franciscan friars. He has three sisters and two brothers. Wall graduated from Chandler High School in Chandler, Arizona, in 1983.

After his high school graduation, Wall entered Arizona State University in Tempe, Arizona, obtaining a Bachelor of Arts degree in history in 1993. Having decided to become a priest, Wall traveled to Camarillo, California, to enter St. John's Seminary, earning a Master of Divinity degree in 1998.

=== Ordination and ministry ===
Wall was ordained to the priesthood at the Cathedral of Saints Simon and Jude in Phoenix for the Diocese of Phoenix by Bishop Thomas O'Brien on June 6, 1998. The diocese assigned Wall as parochial vicar at St. Theresa Parish in Phoenix. He was transferred in 2001 to St. Timothy Parish in Mesa, Arizona, to serve as parochial vicar there.

In 2002, Wall became pastor of St. Thomas the Apostle Parish in Phoenix. He remained at St. Thomas until his appointment to the diocesan chancery as vicar for priests in 2007. Wall also served as administrator pro tempore of Our Lady of Perpetual Help Parish in Scottsdale, Arizona, in 2007 and director of the Mount Claret Retreat Center in Phoenix from 2008 to 2009. From 2003 to 2007, Wall was a member of the National Advisory Council for the United States Conference of Catholic Bishops.

=== Bishop of Gallup ===
On February 5, 2009, Wall was appointed the fourth bishop of Gallup by Pope Benedict XVI. He was consecrated on April 2, 2009, by Archbishop Michael Sheehan at Sacred Heart Cathedral in Gallup. His co-consecrators were Bishop Thomas Olmsted and Auxiliary Bishop Edward Clark.

In 2013, Wall renovated a chapel used by local seminarians with sacred art in santero, a New Mexico folk art based on Spanish colonial art. The artist, Arlene Sena, said that prayer was "the key to this tradition". The chapel contains images of the Holy Family, James, brother of Jesus, Francis de Sales, Our Lady of Mount Carmel, two angels, and the Sacred Heart.

Wall walked the 200-mile-long Camino de Santiago de Compostela pilgrim trail in Spain with Bishop James Conley and Archbishop Paul Coakley in 2022.

== See also ==
- Catholic Church hierarchy
- Catholic Church in the United States
- Historical list of the Catholic bishops of the United States
- List of the Catholic bishops of the United States
- Lists of patriarchs, archbishops, and bishops

== Episcopal succession ==
Catholic Church titles
Preceded by Donald Edmond Pelotte	Bishop of Gallup; April 23, 2009–Present	Succeeded by Incumbent
