= St. Michael Indian School =

Roman Catholic day school in Apache County, Arizona

Saint Michael Indian School
- Chi'hootsoi Biolta'

Location
- 1 Lupton Rd; St. Michaels, Arizona, Apache County 86511; United States; 35°39′7″N 109°6′20″W

Information
- Type: Private, coeducational
- Religious affiliation: Roman Catholic
- Founder: Saint Katharine Drexel, Sisters of the Blessed Sacrament
- School district: Roman Catholic Diocese of Gallup
- CEEB code: 030370
- President: Dot Teso
- Principal: Velma Begay
- Grades: Pre-K–12
- Gender: Co-educational
- Houses: Day school, no dormitory
- Colors: Red, white, and black
- Athletics: Junior High and High School programs
- Sports: Cross country, volleyball, basketball, cheer, track & field, softball, baseball
- Team name: Cardinals
- Accreditation: North Central Association of Colleges and Schools
- Newspaper: Cardinal Pursuit
- Website: stmichaelindianschool.org

St. Michael Indian School (SMIS) is a Catholic day school in St. Michaels, Arizona, within the Navajo Nation. It is part of St. Michael Parish in the Diocese of Gallup.

== Founding ==
St. Michael School was founded in 1902 by Katharine Drexel, and construction on campus buildings began soon after.

== Student body ==
97% of the student body are members of the Navajo Nation, and 3% are of other ethnicities.

== Campus ==
- Saint Michael Elementary School is the oldest building on the campus and dates to its founding.
- Saint Michael High School was constructed in 1946 and houses the secondary grades.
- Saint Michael Chapel is utilized weekly for student mass.
