= St. Bonaventure Indian School =

Catholic school in New Mexico, United States

Information
- Other names: Kateri Tekakwitha Academy; Blessed Kateri Tekakwitha Academy
- Religious affiliation: Catholicism
- Established: 1980; 46 years ago
- Founder: Douglas McNeill
- Employees: 65
- Grades: K-8 (currently); K-12 (1986-2001)
- Enrollment: 215 (2015)
- Affiliation: Roman Catholic Diocese of Gallup

St. Bonaventure Indian Mission and School (SBIMS) is a private Catholic nonprofit organization based in Thoreau, New Mexico, along the eastern reaches of the Navajo Nation. The mission serves Diné communities in an area often described as the “checkerboard” region, where Navajo trust lands, individual allotments, and state or private lands are interspersed.

SBIMS services those Native American communities through a tuition-free preschool-through-eighth-grade school and programs in scholarships, water delivery, food assistance, housing and home repair, heating aid, clothing and household goods, employment, and other outreach. The organization describes its purpose as helping people develop self-sufficiency through education, employment, housing, and access to basic necessities. It operates as a 501(c)(3) organization under EIN 85-0326009.

Infrastructure and economic conditions on the Navajo Nation affect access to basic services in many communities. A 2020 estimate cited by the U.S. Environmental Protection Agency indicated that approximately 15% of the Navajo Nation population lacked access to piped water. Navajo Nation sources have also documented persistent unemployment, poverty, and barriers to economic opportunity. United States Department of Agriculture (USDA) research examining 2016–2021 data found that food insecurity was more prevalent among American Indian and Alaska Native-headed households than among U.S. households overall. SBIMS operates educational and social-service programs in this broader regional context, including water delivery, food assistance, housing and home repair, and heating assistance.

== History ==
According to the mission's employee handbook, St. Bonaventure's modern history began in 1974, when the Rev. Douglas A. McNeill arrived in Thoreau as pastor of St. Bonaventure parish. With support from Bishop Jerome J. Hastrich of the Diocese of Gallup and volunteers associated with the Southwest Volunteer Apostolate, the parish expanded religious education in Thoreau, Smith Lake, and Prewitt. Social-service work followed: an outreach office for elderly and homebound residents opened in 1978, a soup kitchen and emergency shelter were operating by 1979, and a preschool opened in September 1980.

The mission added a water-delivery program and thrift shop in 1982, while expanding home repairs, meals, and home visits. St. Bonaventure Academy opened on August 24, 1982, with 35 students through sixth grade and grew rapidly. The handbook records New Mexico accreditation for kindergarten through ninth grade in 1985 and the first eighth-grade graduation that year. In 1986, the mission acquired property including a mobile-home park that became part of its low-income housing and staff-housing programs. A scholarship model introduced in 1987–88 established tuition-free attendance. The organization incorporated in 1992 with an independent board of trustees. Father McNeill's tenure ended in 1994; Robert D. O'Connell subsequently led the mission, followed by Chris Halter, who became executive director in 2006. Under Halter’s leadership, the campus expanded to include teacher housing, a sports complex, a food pantry, and additional community facilities, including a fitness center.

== Education ==
As of the 2026–27 academic year, St. Bonaventure Indian School reports enrollment of around 100 children from preschool through eighth grade. Students pay no tuition and receive breakfast and lunch without charge; mission-operated buses transport students from dispersed communities, and scholarship assistance is available to graduates continuing their education at high schools, colleges, trade schools, and other institutions in New Mexico.

The school states that it is accredited by the North Central Accreditation Agency and operates under the Roman Catholic Diocese of Gallup. It is also listed as a 2025–26 member school by the New Mexico Association of Non-public Schools. Internal program materials describe a school day that combines Catholic religious practice with Diné cultural elements: morning activities include prayer and the Pledge of Allegiance in Navajo, while Navajo language and culture are incorporated into the curriculum. The materials also emphasize small classes, individualized instruction, athletics, transportation, and post-graduation scholarships.

SBIMS describes the school and outreach programs as donor- and grant-supported rather than tuition-funded. IRS-derived nonprofit data confirm the organization's 501(c)(3) status, although conventional Form 990 financial data are not publicly displayed for the entity in ProPublica's nonprofit database. The school is covered under the U.S. Conference of Catholic Bishops’ group federal tax exemption and is included in The Official Catholic Directory.

== Water and Community Outreach ==
Water delivery is among the mission's most extensively documented activities. SBIMS states that its current program operates five days a week, year-round, distributing about 14,000 gallons of potable water per operating day, or more than 3.36 million gallons annually, to around 250 families within roughly 50 miles of Thoreau. Water is supplied from an onsite well.

Through a partnership with DigDeep, the mission has also reported installing more than 200 1,200-gallon cisterns and distributing more than 250 smaller barrels. Independent reporting by NPR affiliates, High Country News, and the Navajo Times documented the service in 2015, when Diné driver Darlene Arviso, widely known as the “Water Lady,” regularly crossed unpaved roads to deliver water to households without plumbing.

Estimates of unmet water access vary by source, date, and measurement. SBIMS relies on the estimates by the local and regional tribal authorities, according to which, roughly 40% of Navajo households lack running water. The mission identifies sparse settlement, rural terrain, and lack of roads as major obstacles to conventional water infrastructure. According to the U.S. Environmental Protection Agency (EPA), providing safe drinking water and basic sanitation to all Navajo homes would require more than $700 million.

The mission's broader outreach includes the Native Hope Food Pantry, urgent home repairs, affordable mobile-home housing, heating and utility assistance, a thrift store, and a community fitness facility.

Its 2024 impact report records more than 2,000 pantry meals, over 450 weekend food backpacks for children, more than $175,000 in urgent home-repair spending, and housing for more than 35 low-income families. These programs operate in a broader context in which USDA found that 23.3% of American Indian and Alaska Native-headed households experienced food insecurity in 2016–2021, compared with 11.1% of U.S. households overall.

== Recognition ==
St. Bonaventure's water program has received regional and national attention through coverage by CBS Sunday Morning News, NPR, High Country News, and the Navajo Times. Arviso's work became the subject of Alice B. McGinty's 2021 children's picture book The Water Lady: How Darlene Arviso Helps a Thirsty Navajo Nation, illustrated by Navajo artist Shonto Begay. The publisher lists the book as a 2022 American Library Association Notable Children's Book.

In August 2026, the Navajo Times reported that Arviso and Navajo Nation hydrologist Crystal Tulley-Cordova had been selected as grand marshals of the 78th Navajo Nation Fair Parade, in recognition of their respective work on Navajo water issues. They served as grand marshals when the parade took place on September 12, 2026.

The mission's employee handbook records receipt of a New Mexico Governor's Volunteer Service Award in 1986. St. Bonaventure Indian Mission and School is also listed in The Official Catholic Directory under the Diocese of Gallup. Its Catholic and diocesan relationship is independently corroborated by a 2013–14 Diocese of Gallup directory, which listed St. Bonaventure Indian Mission and School in Thoreau with a preschool-through-eighth-grade school and outreach to isolated Navajo elders. The Official Catholic Directory continues to publish annual diocesan sections, including Gallup.

== Organizational Independence ==
St. Bonaventure's organizational independence from the Diocese of Gallup was addressed publicly during the diocese's Chapter 11 bankruptcy. In 2015, the Gallup Independent reported a dispute over Thoreau properties being used by St. Bonaventure but listed among diocesan assets. A federal bankruptcy judge ordered the mission, the diocese, and other parties into mediation. The reporting described St. Bonaventure as a separate nonprofit organization while documenting its longstanding institutional relationship with the diocese.

== Past Clergy Abuse Allegations ==
The institution's history also intersects with the Diocese of Gallup's clergy-abuse record. The diocese's February 2026 list of clergy and church workers with credible allegations of sexual abuse of minors includes founder Douglas McNeill and records his St. Bonaventure assignment as 1974–1994. The diocese specifies that inclusion on the list means an allegation was considered credible and serious but does not constitute a judicial determination of guilt.

== Water Rights and Disputes ==
Water delivery, meanwhile, exists within a larger and unresolved legal and policy context. In Arizona v. Navajo Nation (2023), the U.S. Supreme Court held that the 1868 treaty did not require the federal government to take affirmative steps to secure water for the Navajo Nation, while discussing the principle that reservation treaties can reserve water necessary to accomplish a reservation's purposes.

The continuing infrastructure gap is reflected in the Indian Health Service's 2023 launch of a $2.69 million potable-water-delivery pilot program for Navajo homes without running water.

== Community Role ==
Over more than five decades, St. Bonaventure Indian Mission and School has developed from a small Catholic ministry in Thoreau into a locally embedded educational and social-service organization serving communities across the Eastern Navajo Nation. Its programs address both immediate needs — including drinking water, food, heating assistance, clothing, housing repairs, and transportation — and longer-term objectives such as education, scholarships, employment, skills development, and affordable housing.

Within a region where geographic isolation, limited infrastructure, water insecurity, and persistent economic hardship continue to affect many households, the Mission has become particularly associated with direct, community-based assistance. Its water-delivery program, including the work of Darlene Arviso, the widely known “Water Lady,” has brought national attention to the continuing lack of household water access in parts of the Navajo Nation.

More broadly, St. Bonaventure’s history illustrates the role that locally rooted nonprofit institutions can play in complementing tribal and government programs while supporting the dignity, resilience, education, and self-sufficiency of Diné families in the Eastern Navajo Nation.

== Video Series ==
St. Bonaventure Indian Mission and School has produced a five-part video series about its history, education, water delivery, and outreach programs. [link to video series]
