= Diocese of Wuchang =

Roman Catholic diocese in China

Diocese of Wuchang Dioecesis Uciamensis 天主教武昌教区

Location
- Country: China
- Ecclesiastical province: Hankou
- Metropolitan: Hankou

Information
- Denomination: Roman Catholic
- Rite: Latin Rite

Current leadership
- Pope: Leo XIV
- Bishop: Sede Vacante
- Metropolitan Archbishop: Sede Vacante

The Roman Catholic Diocese of Wuchang (Latin: Uciamen(sis), Chinese: 武昌) is a diocese located in the Wuchang District of Wuhan (Hubei) in the ecclesiastical province of Hankou in China.

== History ==
- December 12, 1923: Established as Apostolic Prefecture of Wuchang 武昌
- May 31, 1930: Promoted as Apostolic Vicariate of Wuchang 武昌
- April 11, 1946: Promoted as Diocese of Wuchang 武昌

== Leadership ==
- Bishops of Wuchang 武昌 (Roman rite)
  - Bishop Rombert Casimir Kowalski, O.F.M. (April 11, 1946 – November 27, 1970)
- Vicars Apostolic of Wuchang 武昌 (Roman Rite)
  - Bishop Rombert Casimir Kowalski, O.F.M. (November 24, 1941 – April 11, 1946)
  - Bishop Sylvester Espelage, O.F.M. (July 17, 1925 – October 25, 1940)
