= Diocese of Gallup =

Latin Catholic jurisdiction in the US

Coordinates: 35°31′25″N 108°44′03″W

Diocese of Gallup Dioecesis Gallupiensis Diócesis de Gallup

Catholic
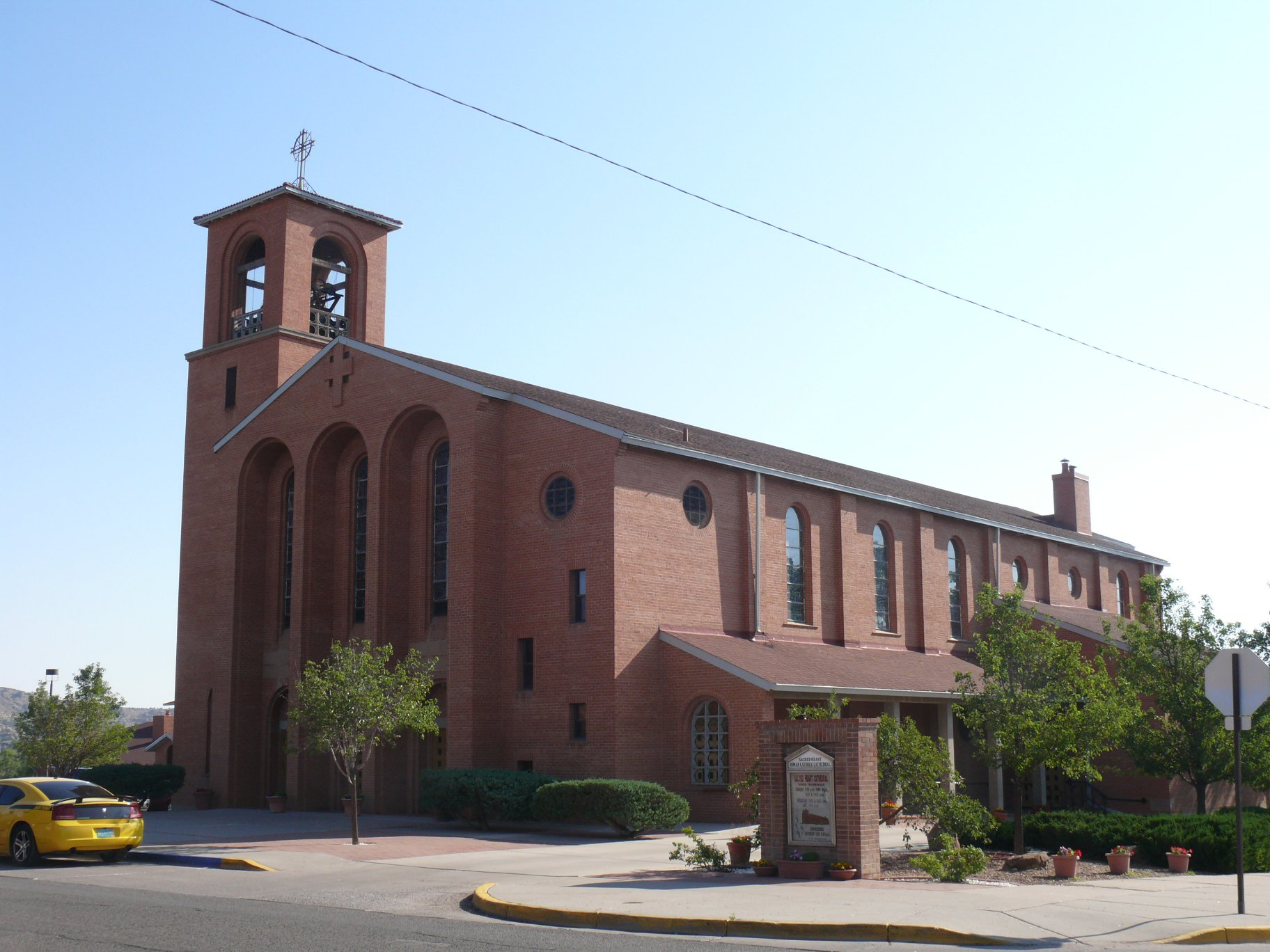
- Sacred Heart Cathedral

- Coat of arms

Location
- Country: United States
- Territory: Arizona counties of Navajo and Apache; New Mexico counties of San Juan, McKinley, Cibola, Catron and parts of Rio Arriba, Sandoval, Bernalillo, and Valencia counties
- Episcopal conference: United States Conference of Catholic Bishops
- Ecclesiastical region: Region XIII
- Ecclesiastical province: Santa Fe

Statistics
- Area: 55,468 sq mi (143,660 km^{2})
- Population: Total; Catholics: (as of 2006); 470,000; 60,000 (12.8%)
- Parishes: 56

Information
- Denomination: Catholic
- Sui iuris church: Latin Church
- Rite: Roman Rite
- Established: December 16, 1939 (86 years ago)
- Cathedral: Sacred Heart Cathedral
- Patron saint: Our Lady of Guadalupe

Current leadership
- Pope: Leo XIV
- Bishop: James S. Wall
- Metropolitan Archbishop: John Charles Wester

Map
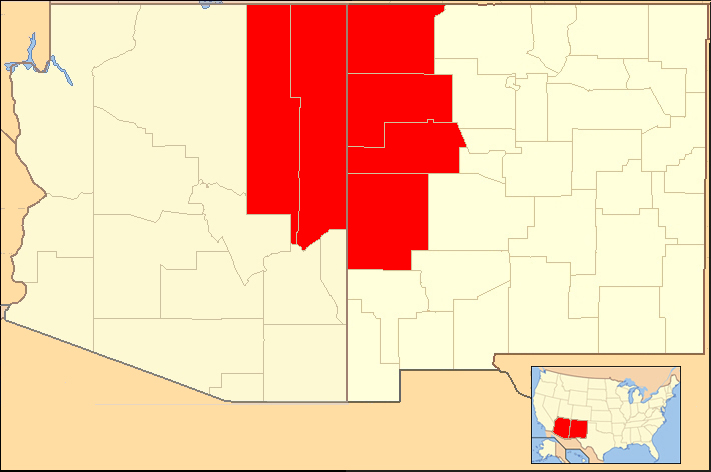

Website
- dioceseofgallup.org

The Diocese of Gallup (Latin: Dioecesis Gallupiensis, Spanish: Diócesis de Gallup) is a diocese of the Catholic Church in northwestern New Mexico and northeastern Arizona in the United States. It is a suffragan diocese in the ecclesiastical province of the metropolitan Archdiocese of Santa Fe. The mother church is the Sacred Heart Cathedral in Gallup. The bishop is James Sean Wall.

== Territory ==
The Diocese of Gallup comprise the following counties:

- Navajo and Apache counties in Arizona
- San Juan, McKinley, Cibola and Catron counties in New Mexico
- Parts of Rio Arriba, Sandoval, Bernalillo, and Valencia counties in New Mexico

== History ==
=== Name changes ===
The current Diocese of Gallup has undergone several name changes since its territory became part of the United States.

The New Mexico counties came from:

1. Vicariate Apostolic of New Mexico (1850 to 1853)
2. Diocese of Santa Fe (1853 to 1875)
3. Archdiocese of Santa Fe (1875 to 1939)
4. Diocese of Gallup (1939 to present)

The Arizona counties came from:

1. Diocese of Santa Fe (1868 to 1891)
2. Vicariate Apostolic of Arizona (1891 to 1897)
3. Diocese of Tucson (1897 to 1939)
4. Diocese of Gallup (1939 to present)

=== 1500 to 1898 ===
From the 16th century to the early 19th century, all of present-day New Mexico and Arizona were part of New Spain, a Spanish colony. The first Catholic presence in the present-day Gallup region was that of Marcos de Niza, a Franciscan friar who arrived in the land of the Zuni people in 1539, looking for cities of gold. He was followed in 1540 by the expedition of the Spaniard Francisco Vasquez Coronado in Cibola, also looking for gold. During the 1580s, small parties of Franciscan friars started visiting the native settlements in the region, evangelizing the natives.

The first colonizing expedition, under the first governor, Juan de Onate, arrived in the Pueblo nation in 1598. He sent friars to all the pueblos to spur on conversions to Catholicism. The next year, the Spanish were attacked by Pueblo tribesmen, prompting bloody reprisals. At this time, evangelizing began in the Zuni and Hopi lands.

During the 17th century, the Franciscans increased their number in the region. They encountered increase suspicion and hostility. In the 1630s, a group of Hopi people brought a blind boy to a priest named Francisco. They told Francisco that they would kill him if he failed to cure the boy. According to Franciscan accounts, he restored the boy's sight, a miracle. A few years later, Francisco was poisoned by disgruntled leaders of the Hopi community. In 1680, several missionaries were killed by an alliance of Pueblo tribes during the bloody Pueblo Revolt. During the 18th century, the Franciscans continued to build missions in the region.

In 1821, the Mexican War of Independence forced Spain to cede its western colonies to the new state of Mexico. The Spanish Franciscan priests soon left New Mexico; the missions soon fell into disrepair. Only nine Mexican priests were serving the region by the 1840s.After the end of the Mexican-American War in 1848, Mexico ceded all of New Mexico and Arizona to the United States.

=== 1898 to 1939 ===
The first Catholic missionaries to the Navaho Nation were Franciscan priests who arrived there in 1898. The first Catholic church in Gallup, New Mexico, was Sacred Heart Church, constructed by the priest George Julliard in 1899. St. Michael Indian School was opened in 1902 in St. Michael's, Arizona by Franciscans from St. Michael's Mission in Window Rock, Arizona. They received financial assistance from Mother Katharine Drexel.

=== 1939 to 2000 ===
Pope Pius XII erected the Diocese of Gallup on December 16, 1939, taking its territory from the Archdiocese of Santa Fe and the Diocese of Tucson. The pope named Bernard T. Espelage as the first bishop of Gallup.During Espelage's 29-year tenure, the Catholic population of the diocese increased from 30,000 to 79,260. The number of priests went from 32 to 108 and the number of parishes from 17 to 53. Espelage retired as bishop of Gallup in 1969. That same year, the Vatican erected the Diocese of Phoenix, taking part of its territory from the Diocese of Gallup.

The second bishop of Gallup was Bishop Jerome J. Hastrich from the Diocese of Madison, named by Pope Paul VI in 1969. Pope John Paul II named Donald Pelotte as coadjutor archbishop in 1986 to assist Hastrich. When Hastrich retired in 1990, Pelotte automatically succeeded him as bishop of Gallup. Pelotte was the first Native American Catholic bishop in the United States, an Abenaki from Maine.

=== 2000 to present ===
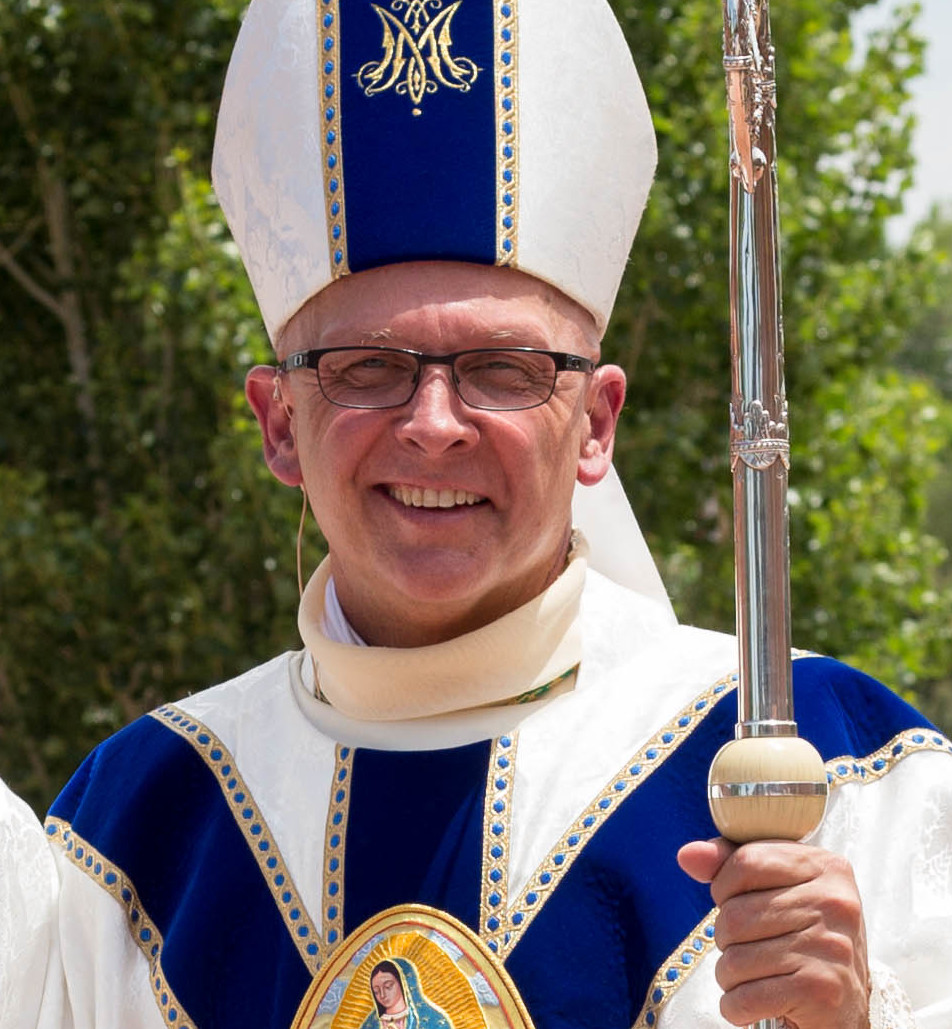
Bishop Wall (2018)

In 2007, Pelotte suffered a traumatic brain injury at his home and was hospitalized. In January 2008, Pope Benedict XVI named an apostolic administrator to run the diocese. In April 2008, Pelotte retired due to his health problems. The pope in 2009 named James S. Wall to replace Wall.

In 2013, Wall renovated a chapel used by local seminarians with sacred art in santero, a New Mexico folk art based on Spanish colonial art. In May 2023, Wall announced that the diocese was taking over operation of St. Michael's Mission from the Franciscans. Also in 2013, the diocese filed for Chapter 11 bankruptcy in order to settle sexual abuse lawsuits against diocesan clergy.The case was closed in 2017.

Wall in 2025 ordered a group of young men in Concho to vacate housing owned by the local parish and stop teaching in Catholic schools. Calling themselves the League of the Blessed Sacrament, the men had been expelled from the Canons Regular of Immaculate Conception in Santa Paula, California, four years earlier. Wall said that the group had no official status with the Catholic church.

=== Sex abuse ===
In 2004, James Burns, a diocesan priest, was sentenced to 18 months in prison for sexually abusing a boy in Blanco, New Mexico. The diocese in 2005 identified the priest Clement A. Hageman as an abuser of children from the 1940s to the 1970s. Hageman was transferred to the Archdiocese of Santa Fe from the Diocese of Corpus Christi when allegations of sexual abuse arose there. The archdiocese later moved the priest to the Diocese of Gallup for the same reason.

The diocese released a list of 42 clergy and one lay teacher with credible accusations of sexual abuse of minors in 2014.In February 2017, it was announced that the diocese had paid more than $17.6 million in financial settlements to 57 victims by diocesan clergy.

== Bishops ==
=== Bishops of Gallup ===
1. Bernard T. Espelage (1940–1969)
2. Jerome J. Hastrich (1969–1990)
3. Donald Edmond Pelotte (1990–2008)
4. James Sean Wall (2009–present)

=== Coadjutor bishop ===
- Donald Edmond Pelotte (1986–1990)

== Schools ==
=== Schools with high school divisions ===
- St. Michael Indian School (K-12) – St. Michaels, Arizona

=== Schools with former high school divisions ===
- Gallup Catholic School – Gallup, New Mexico (high school closed in 2013)
- St. Bonaventure School – Thoreau, New Mexico (high school closed in 2001)

== Arms ==
Coat of arms of Diocese of Gallup
Notes Arms was designed and adopted when the diocese was erected Adopted 1939 Escutcheon The arms of the diocese are a green field with three red crosses below a silver star. Symbolism The green field honors the heritage of the Native American peoples in the diocese. The crosses represent Reverends Francisco Letrado, Martin de Arvide, and Pedro de Avila y Ayala, all of whom were martyred. The star represents Mary, mother of Jesus, the patroness of the diocese.
