= Gallup, New Mexico =

Gallup, New Mexico Naʼnízhoozhí (Navajo)
- City
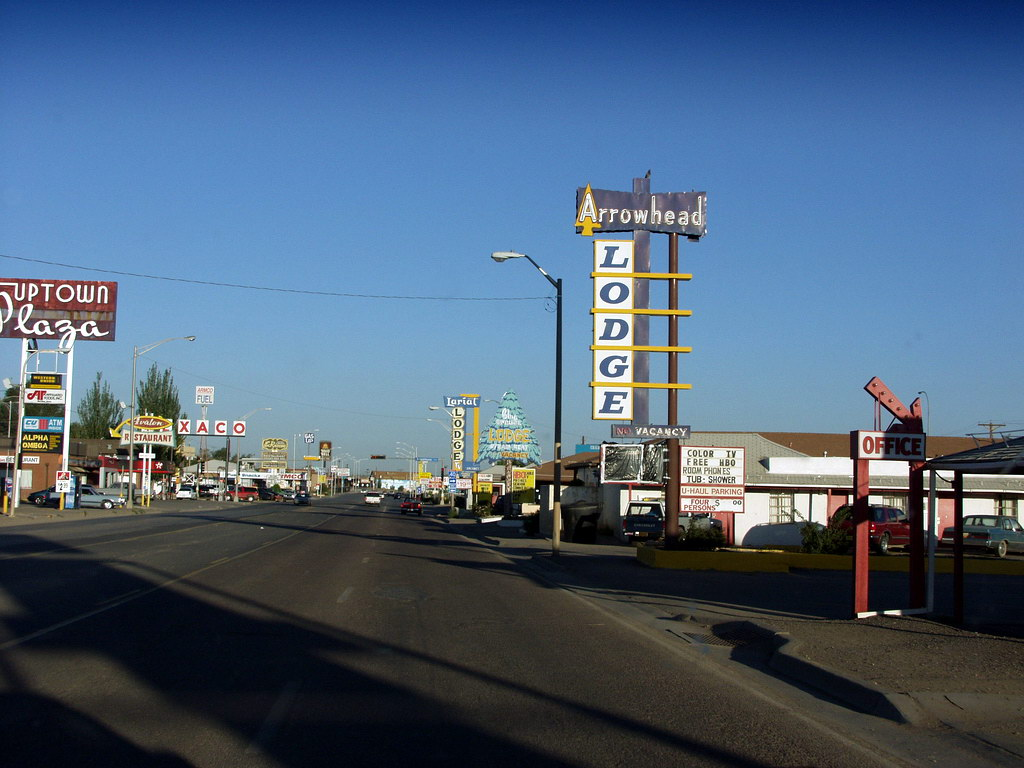
- Motels and businesses in Gallup

- Flag
- Nickname: "Capital of the World"
- Location of Gallup in McKinley County and the state of New Mexico

- Location in the United States
- Coordinates: 35°30′50″N 108°44′35″W
- Country: United States
- State: New Mexico
- County: McKinley
- Founded: 1881

Government
  - Mayor: Marc DePauli

Area
  - City: 20.19 sq mi (52.30 km^{2})
  - Land: 20.19 sq mi (52.29 km^{2})
  - Water: 0.0039 sq mi (0.01 km^{2})
- Elevation: 6,647 ft (2,026 m)

Population (2020)
  - City: 21,899
  - Density: 1,084.6/sq mi (418.78/km^{2})
  - Metro: 71,492
- Time zone: UTC−7 (MST)
  - Summer (DST): UTC−6 (MDT)
- ZIP codes: 87301, 87302, 87305, 87310, 87317, 87319, 87326, 87375
- Area code: 505
- FIPS code: 35-28460
- GNIS feature ID: 2410562
- Website: gallupnm.gov

Gallup (Navajo: Naʼnízhoozhí) is a city in McKinley County, New Mexico, United States, with a population of 21,899 as of the 2020 census. A substantial percentage of its population is Native American, with residents from the Navajo, Hopi, and Zuni tribes. Gallup is the county seat of McKinley County and the most populous city between Flagstaff and Albuquerque along historic U.S. Route 66.

Gallup is known as the "Heart of Indian Country" because it is on the edge of the Navajo reservation and is also home to members of many other tribes. Because of the nearby rugged terrain, it was a popular location in the 1940s and 1950s for Hollywood Westerns. The city is on the Trails of the Ancients Byway, one of the designated New Mexico Scenic Byways.

== History ==
Gallup was founded in 1881 as a railhead for the Atlantic and Pacific Railroad. The city was named after David Gallup, a paymaster for the Atlantic and Pacific Railroad.

There is widespread belief that during World War II, the city fought successfully to prevent 800 Japanese American residents from being placed in wartime internment, the only New Mexico city to do so. But this is not true. Executive Order 9066 was never used to intern people living in Gallup, and the city complied with all federal orders and policies during the war.

On August 4, 2022, an SUV driven by an intoxicated individual drove through a parade crowd during the city's 100th annual Intertribal Celebration, leaving 15 injured, including two police officers and several children.

== Geography ==
Gallup is in western McKinley County, 20 miles (32 km) east of the Arizona border. Interstate 40 passes through the north side of the city, with access from Exits 16, 20, and 22. The highway leads east 138 miles (222 km) to Albuquerque and west 95 miles (153 km) to Holbrook, Arizona. Historic U.S. Route 66 passes through the center of town. U.S. Route 491 has its southern terminus at I-40 in Gallup and leads north 94 miles (151 km) to Shiprock and then into Colorado.

According to the U.S. Census Bureau, the city has a total area of 20.2 square miles (52 km^{2}), of which 0.003 square miles (0.008 km^{2}) are water. The city is in the valley of the Puerco River, which runs southwest to join the Little Colorado River in Holbrook.

=== Climate ===
Gallup, like most of the interior Mountain West, has a cool semiarid climate (Köppen BSk). The summers are hot during the day, but the high altitude and low humidity mean that nights remain distinctly cool; as late as July 2, 1997, the temperature fell to 31 °F (−1 °C). Despite the large diurnal temperature range, most rain falls in the summer from afternoon thunderstorms. Snow is common and sometimes heavy; the maximum in a month is 29.1 inches (73.91 cm) in December 1992 and the most in a year 65.1 inches (165.35 cm) between July 1990 and June 1991. Actual snow cover, with the hot sun at Gallup's altitude, however, has never exceeded 13.1 inches (33 cm), and for no day averages over 3.5 inches (8.9 cm).

Climate data for Gallup Municipal Airport, New Mexico, 1991–2020 normals, extremes 1973–present
Month	Jan	Feb	Mar	Apr	May	Jun	Jul	Aug	Sep	Oct	Nov	Dec	Year
Record high °F (°C)	68 (20)	73 (23)	87 (31)	86 (30)	95 (35)	101 (38)	101 (38)	98 (37)	96 (36)	88 (31)	78 (26)	66 (19)	101 (38)
Mean maximum °F (°C)	57.5 (14.2)	63.5 (17.5)	71.8 (22.1)	78.8 (26.0)	87.1 (30.6)	94.9 (34.9)	96.2 (35.7)	93.1 (33.9)	88.8 (31.6)	80.7 (27.1)	69.7 (20.9)	59.5 (15.3)	97.1 (36.2)
Mean daily maximum °F (°C)	45.4 (7.4)	49.9 (9.9)	58.5 (14.7)	65.7 (18.7)	75.0 (23.9)	86.2 (30.1)	88.8 (31.6)	86.1 (30.1)	79.9 (26.6)	68.5 (20.3)	55.8 (13.2)	45.2 (7.3)	67.1 (19.5)
Daily mean °F (°C)	29.8 (−1.2)	34.4 (1.3)	40.6 (4.8)	47.0 (8.3)	55.6 (13.1)	65.7 (18.7)	71.7 (22.1)	69.7 (20.9)	62.2 (16.8)	49.7 (9.8)	38.0 (3.3)	29.5 (−1.4)	49.5 (9.7)
Mean daily minimum °F (°C)	14.2 (−9.9)	18.9 (−7.3)	22.7 (−5.2)	28.3 (−2.1)	36.3 (2.4)	45.1 (7.3)	54.5 (12.5)	53.3 (11.8)	44.4 (6.9)	31.0 (−0.6)	20.2 (−6.6)	13.9 (−10.1)	31.9 (−0.1)
Mean minimum °F (°C)	−3.7 (−19.8)	1.6 (−16.9)	7.6 (−13.6)	13.7 (−10.2)	23.0 (−5.0)	32.3 (0.2)	43.3 (6.3)	42.9 (6.1)	28.9 (−1.7)	15.5 (−9.2)	4.1 (−15.5)	−4.9 (−20.5)	−8.4 (−22.4)
Record low °F (°C)	−20 (−29)	−25 (−32)	−10 (−23)	6 (−14)	12 (−11)	23 (−5)	31 (−1)	35 (2)	20 (−7)	1 (−17)	−26 (−32)	−34 (−37)	−34 (−37)
Average precipitation inches (mm)	0.81 (21)	0.71 (18)	0.62 (16)	0.46 (12)	0.57 (14)	0.36 (9.1)	1.63 (41)	1.92 (49)	1.27 (32)	0.92 (23)	0.70 (18)	0.73 (19)	10.70 (272)
Average snowfall inches (cm)	6.3 (16)	5.9 (15)	4.4 (11)	2.3 (5.8)	1.1 (2.8)	0.0 (0.0)	0.0 (0.0)	0.0 (0.0)	0.0 (0.0)	1.5 (3.8)	4.5 (11)	7.8 (20)	33.8 (86)
Average precipitation days (≥ 0.01 inch)	6.1	6.0	5.4	4.2	4.2	2.8	10.2	10.7	7.0	5.5	4.6	5.8	72.5
Average snowy days (≥ 0.1 inch)	4.3	4.5	2.5	2.6	0.7	0.0	0.0	0.0	0.0	0.9	2.5	4.5	22.5
Source: NOAA

== Demographics ==
Historical population
Census	Pop.	Note	%±
1900	2,948		—
1910	2,264		−23.2%
1920	3,920		73.1%
1930	5,992		52.9%
1940	7,041		17.5%
1950	9,133		29.7%
1960	14,089		54.3%
1970	14,596		3.6%
1980	18,167		24.5%
1990	19,154		5.4%
2000	20,209		5.5%
2010	21,678		7.3%
2020	21,899		1.0%
U.S. Decennial Census

=== 2020 census ===
As of the 2020 census, Gallup had a population of 21,899. The median age was 34.4 years. 27.6% of residents were under the age of 18 and 13.7% of residents were 65 years of age or older. For every 100 females there were 91.4 males, and for every 100 females age 18 and over there were 88.5 males age 18 and over.

97.0% of residents lived in urban areas, while 3.0% lived in rural areas.

There were 7,573 households in Gallup, of which 38.8% had children under the age of 18 living in them. Of all households, 36.4% were married-couple households, 19.0% were households with a male householder and no spouse or partner present, and 34.5% were households with a female householder and no spouse or partner present. About 26.6% of all households were made up of individuals and 10.4% had someone living alone who was 65 years of age or older.

There were 8,306 housing units, of which 8.8% were vacant. The homeowner vacancy rate was 1.4% and the rental vacancy rate was 7.4%.

Racial composition as of the 2020 census
Race	Number	Percent
White	4,981	22.7%
Black or African American	229	1.0%
American Indian and Alaska Native	11,210	51.2%
Asian	673	3.1%
Native Hawaiian and Other Pacific Islander	16	0.1%
Some other race	2,302	10.5%
Two or more races	2,488	11.4%
Hispanic or Latino (of any race)	6,090	27.8%

=== 2000 census ===
As of the 2000 census, 20,209 people, 6,810 households, and 4,869 families were residing in the city. The population density was 1,513.7 inhabitants per square mile (584.4/km^{2}). There were 7,349 housing units at an average density of 550.5 per square mile (212.5/km^{2}). The racial makeup of the city was 43.8% Native American, 35.2% White, 2.0% Asian, 1.2% African American, 12.1% from other races, and 5.8% from two or more races. About 31.7% of the population was Hispanic or Latino of any race.

Of the 6,810 households, 41.1% had children under 18 living with them, 45.3% were married couples living together, 19.8% had a female householder with no husband present, and 28.5% were not families. About 23.8% of all households were made up of individuals, and 6.8% had someone living alone who was 65 or older. The average household size was 2.85, and the average family size was 3.39.

In the city, the age distribution was 32.7% under 18, 9.3% from 18 to 24, 28.8% from 25 to 44, 20.3% from 45 to 64, and 8.9% who were 65 or older. The median age was 31 years. For every 100 females, there were 91.0 males. For every 100 females 18 and over, there were 86.2 males.

It has close proximity to Native American reservations, and historic lack of economic development in addition to many mine closures in the last century. As a result of these closures, a large proportion of Gallup's households is low-income. The median income for a household in the city was $34,868, and the median income for a family was $39,197. Males had a median income of $33,380 versus $24,441 for females. The per capita income for the city was $15,789. About 16.6% of families and 20.8% of the population were below the poverty line, including 26.8% of those under age 18 and 16.8% of those age 65 or over.

=== Other demographics ===
Gallup has a significant Palestinian-American population, unusual for a city its size.

=== Crime ===
The city had the highest violent crime rate in New Mexico in 2013 as per a crime report from the Federal Bureau of Investigation. According to an article published in November 2014, "Gallup saw 463 violent crimes last year including murder, rape, robbery, and aggravated assault. That's an 11% increase from the year before and two times the rate of Albuquerque, the state's largest city."

== Arts and culture ==
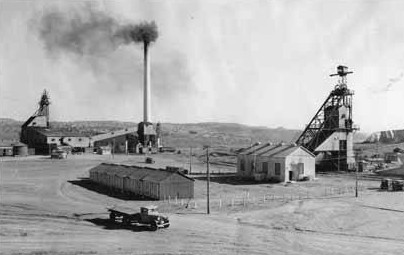
American Coal Company mine and plant, Gallup, circa 1920: Early coal mining here supplied the railroad's steam locomotives.

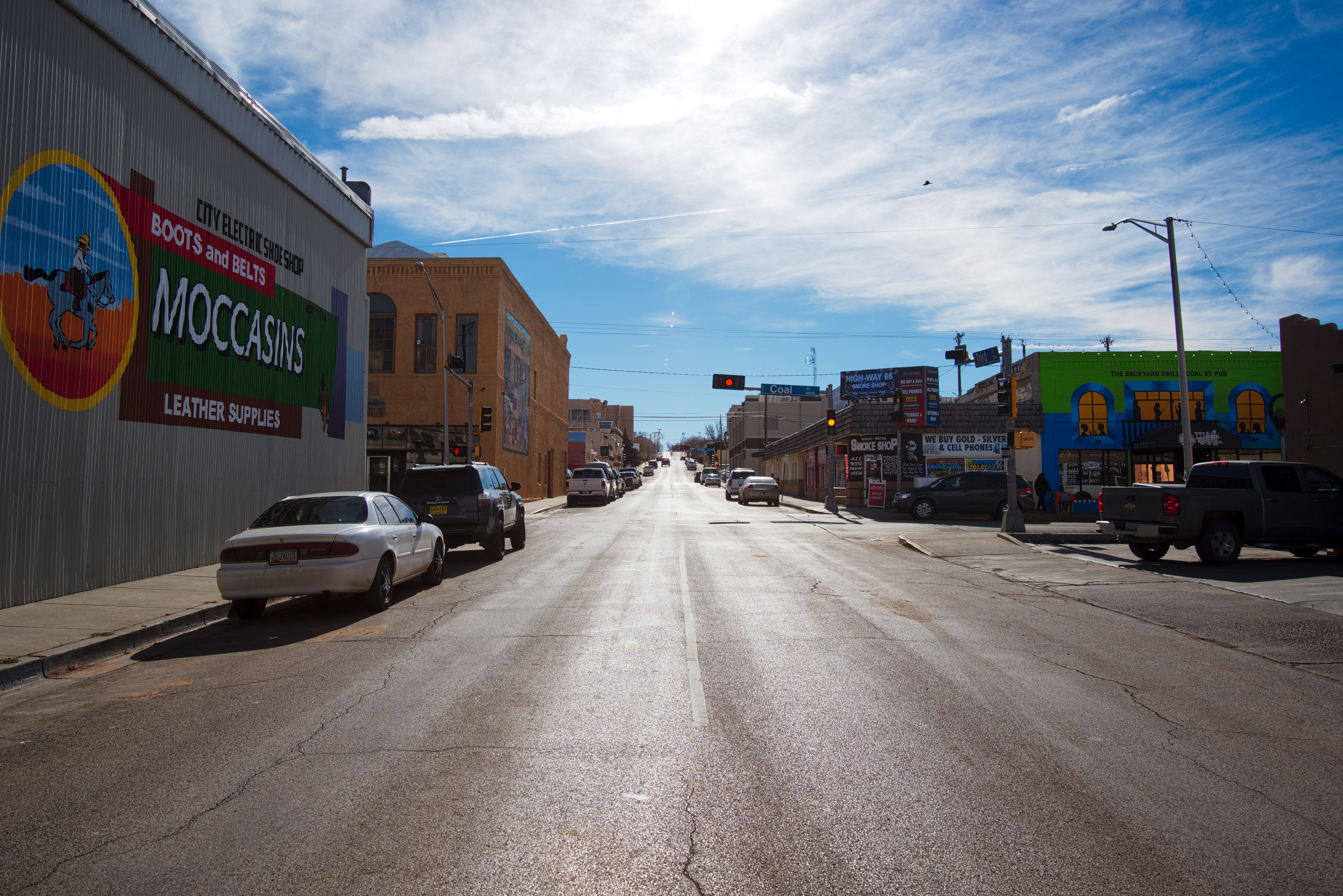
South 3rd Street

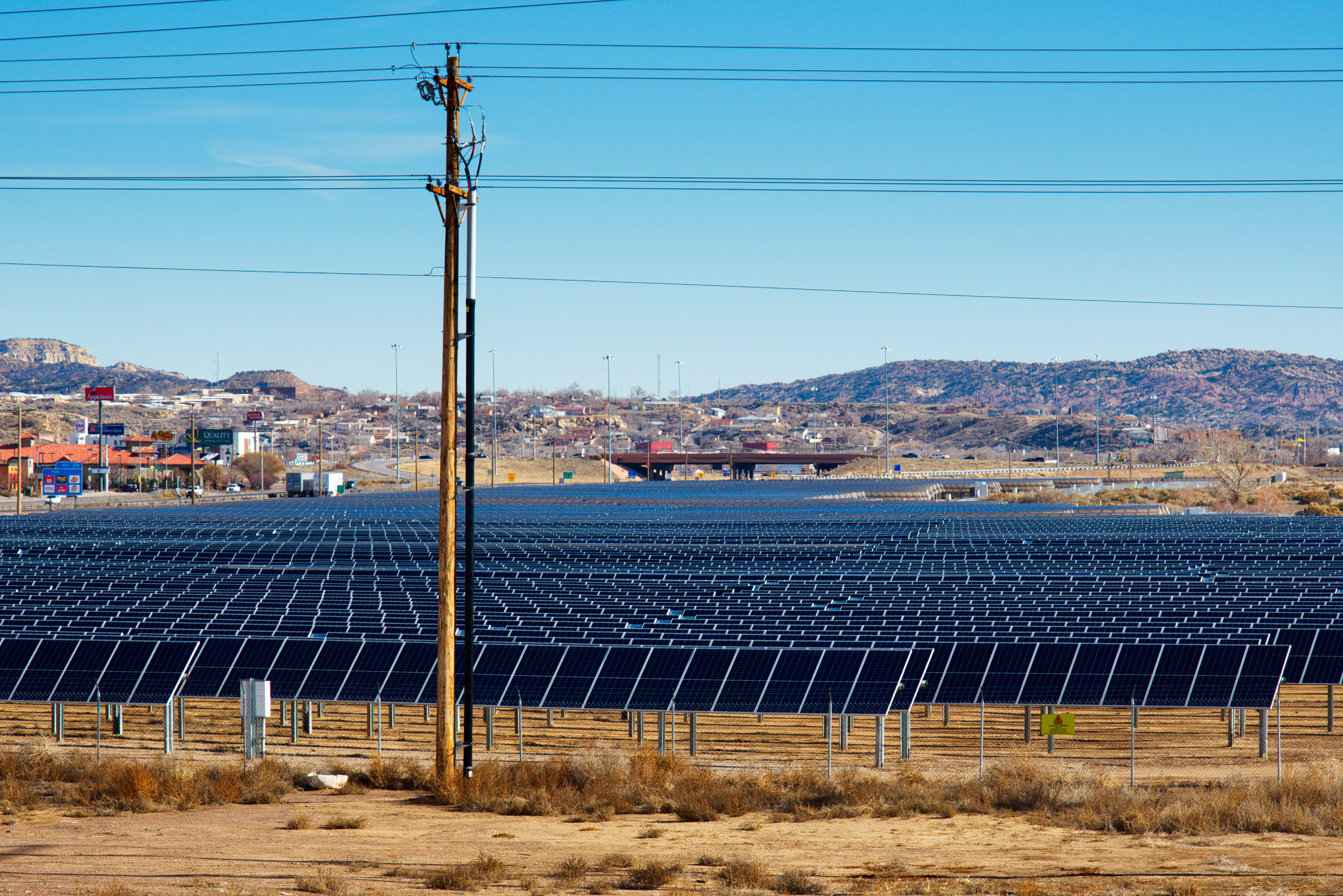
Solar farm in Gallup

U.S. Route 66 passed through Gallup, and the town's name is mentioned in the lyrics of the song "(Get Your Kicks on) Route 66" ("You'll see Amarillo and Gallup, New Mexico"). In 2003, the U.S. and New Mexico Departments of Transportation renumbered US Highway 666, the city's other major highway, as Route 491. Former Governor Bill Richardson pushed for (and got) the number changed because "666" is associated with Satan and Devil worship, thus it was considered "cursed" or a "Beast" to some locals, and a icon in Natural Born Killers. The situation was exacerbated by the high death toll on the highway, which was largely a result of high rates of drivers under the influence of alcohol or drugs, and budget shortfalls among both the New Mexico Department of Transportation and state and local law-enforcement agencies.

Gallup has a modest night time culture downtown, including Indian dances during summertime nights, art crawls, and small museums, along with a Navajo code talk museum. Gallup commissioned a number of murals highlighting local culture, and contributions dot downtown.

Being the largest city between Flagstaff and Albuquerque, Gallup claims many notable buildings, places, events, and people. The historic El Rancho Hotel & Motel has hosted a numerous array of movie stars, including John Wayne, Ronald Reagan, Humphrey Bogart, Spencer Tracy, Katharine Hepburn, Joan Crawford, Kirk Douglas, Doris Day, Gregory Peck, and Burt Lancaster. The rugged terrain surrounding Gallup was popular with Hollywood filmmakers during the 1940s and '50s for the on-location shooting of Westerns. Actors and film crews would stay at that hotel during filming. Films made in Gallup include Billy the Kid (1930), Pursued (1947), The Sea of Grass (1947), Four Faces West (1948), Only the Valiant (1951), Ace in the Hole (1951), Escape from Fort Bravo (1953), A Distant Trumpet (1964), and The Hallelujah Trail (1965). Other movies shot here are Redskin (1928), and Superman (1978).

Gallup is sometimes called the "Indian Capital of the World", for its location in the heart of Native American lands, and the presence of Navajo, Zuni, Hopi, and other tribes. Well over a third of the city's population has Native American roots. Gallup's nickname references the huge impact of the Native American cultures found in and around the city.

== Education ==
Gallup-McKinley County Public Schools is the local school district. There are two public high schools: Gallup High School and Miyamura High School.

Additionally, Sacred Heart Catholic School (formerly Gallup Catholic School) is a PreK-8 school in Gallup; it is within the Roman Catholic Diocese of Gallup.

Previously, the Bureau of Indian Affairs (BIA) operated Manuelito Hall in Gallup, a dormitory that housed Native American students attending Gallup-McKinley schools. In 1973, it had about 300 students. That year, the BIA closed Manuelito Hall, planning to move students to various boarding schools.

== Infrastructure ==
=== Transportation ===
- Gallup Municipal Airport is a public airport with primarily private and charter flights. The Aviation Identifier for the airport is GUP.

Major highways:

- Interstate 40
- U.S. Route 491

Railroad:

- Rail freight service passes through Gallup on the Southern Transcon of the BNSF Railroad.
- Amtrak's Southwest Chief provides passenger service at the Gallup train station.

Bus:

- The Navajo Transit System provides regional bus services throughout the Navajo Nation. Gallup is served by Route 05 to Fort Defiance, Arizona, and Route 06 to Crystal, New Mexico.
- The Gallup Express provides local service to Gallup and connection to Zuni.
- A:shiwi Transit connects Zuni Pueblo and Black Rock with Gallup.
- Greyhound has a local stop on West Highway 66.

== Notable people ==
- Kay Curley Bennett, Navajo artist, musician, and writer
- Anthonette Cayedito, kidnap victim, missing child
- Glenn L. Emmons, banker (1929) and the commissioner of the Bureau of Indian Affairs (1953–1961)
- Mike Everitt, former Major League Baseball umpire
- Sydney Freeland, filmmaker
- Chon Gallegos, former NFL quarterback for the Oakland Raiders
- Tony Genaro, late actor
- Carl Nelson Gorman (Kin-Ya-Onny-Beyeh), Navajo code talker during World War II, visual artist and professor.
- Arthur T. Hannett, mayor of Gallup, and seventh governor of New Mexico
- Tito Jackson, former member of The Jackson 5, died in Gallup
- Vernon Kerr, scientist and member of the New Mexico House of Representatives
- Lealand McSpadden, racing driver
- Hiroshi H. Miyamura, Medal of Honor recipient in the U.S. Army, awarded for his actions during the Korean War
- Eric-Paul Riege, contemporary artist
- Carolyn S. Shoemaker, astronomer and co-discoverer of Comet Shoemaker-Levy 9
- Sunshine Sykes, lawyer and jurist

== See also ==
- Roman Catholic Diocese of Gallup
- USS Gallup, name of three ships in the United States Navy, the later two named for the city
