= List of churches in the Diocese of Phoenix =

This is a list of churches and missions in the Roman Catholic Diocese of Phoenix in Arizona in the United States. The diocese includes Coconino, Maricopa, Mohave, Pinal and Yavapai Counties.

== Maricopa County (A to R) ==
Church or mission name	Image	Address	Description
All Saints Catholic Newman Center		230 E University Dr, Tempe	Founded in 1932. Located at Arizona State University
All Saints Church		1534 N Recker Rd #4, Mesa	Founded in 1972, current church dedicated in 2011
Ascension Church		12615 N Fountain Hills Blvd, Fountain Hills	Founded as mission in 1973, became a parish in 1976, current church dedicated in 1980
Blessed Sacrament Church		11300 N 64th St, Scottsdale	Founded in 1974, church dedicated in 1977
Blessed Sacrament Church		512 N 93rd Ave, Tolleson	Founded in 1949
Cathedral of Saints Simon and Jude		Phoenix	
Christ the King Church		1551 E Dana Ave, Mesa	Founded in 1959, current church dedicated in 1981
Corpus Christi Church		3550 E Knox Rd, Phoenix	Founded in 1985,
Good Shepherd Mission		45033 N 12th St New River	Operated by St. Rose
Holy Cross Church		1244 S Power Rd, Mesa	Founded in 1978, current church dedicated in 1982
Holy Family Church		6802 S 24th St, Phoenix	
Holy Spirit Church		1800 E Libra Dr, Tempe	Founded in 1973, current church dedicated in 2001
Holy Spirit Newman Center		3057 W Camelback Rd, Phoenix	Located at Grand Canyon University
Immaculate Heart of Mary Church		909 E Washington St, Phoenix	Church dedicated in 1928
Mater Misericordiae Mission		1537 W Monroe St, Phoenix	Operated by the Apostolate of the Priestly Fraternity of Saint Peter
Most Holy Trinity Church		8620 N 7th St, Phoenix	Founded as a mission in the 1940s, became a parish in 1951, church dedicated in 1957
Our Lady of Czestochowa Church		2828 W Country Gables Dr, Phoenix	Founded as a Polish mission in 2000, current church consecrated in 2006, became a parish in 2008
Our Lady of Fatima Church		1418 S 17th Ave, Phoenix	Founded as a mission in 1956, became a parish in 2013
Our Lady of Guadalupe Church		5445 E Calle San Angelo, Guadalupe	
Our Lady of Guadalupe Church		20615 E Ocotillo Rd, Queen Creek	Founded as a mission in 1940s, church dedicated in 1988, became a parish in 2006
Our Lady of Guadalupe Mission		50627 Eagle Eye Rd, Aguila	Operated by St. Anthony of Padua Parish
Our Lady of Joy Church		36811 N Pima Rd, Carefree	Founded as a mission in 1964, became a parish in 1972, current church dedicated in 1987
Our Lady of Lourdes Church		19002 N 128th Ave, Sun City West	Founded in 1977, current church dedicated in 1988
Our Lady of Mount Carmel Church		2121 S Rural Rd, Tempe	Founded in 1932
Our Lady of Perpetual Help Church		5614 W Orangewood Ave, Glendale	Founded as a parish in 1947, current church dedicated in 1973
Our Lady of Perpetual Help Church		7655 E Main St, Scottsdale	Mission founded in 1920s, became parish in 1949. Current church dedicated in 1978.
Our Lady of the Valley & St. Raphael Parish		Our Lady of the Valley Church, 3220 W Greenway Rd, Phoenix	Merged with St. Raphael
		St. Raphael, 55th Avenue and Acoma, Phoenix	Merged with Our Lady of the Valley
Prince of Peace Church		14818 W Deer Valley Dr, Sun City West	
Queen of Peace Church		30 W 1st Street, Mesa	Founded as mission in 1908 under the name Sacred Heart. Current church dedicated in 1948.
Resurrection Church		3201 S Evergreen Rd, Tempe	Current church dedicated in 1977

== Maricopa County S to Z ==
Church or mission name	Image	Address	Description
Sacred Heart Church		1421 S 12th St, Phoenix	
Santa Teresita Church		14016 N Verbena St, El Mirage	Founded as a mission in 1952, first church built in 1953
St. Agnes Church		1954 N 24th St, Phoenix	Founded in 1940, current church constructed in 1953
St. Andrew the Apostle Church		3450 W Ray Rd, Chandler	
St. Anne Church		440 E Elliot Rd, Gilbert	Founded as a mission in 1936, became a parish in 1943, current church dedicated in 1989.
St. Anthony Church		909 S 1st Ave, Phoenix	
St. Anthony of Padua Church		244 N Tegner St, Wickenburg	
St. Augustine Church		3630 N 71st Ave, Phoenix	Founded in 1970, church dedicated in 1972
St. Benedict Church		16223 S 48th St, Phoenix	
St. Bernadette Church		16245 N 60th St, Scottsdale	
St. Bernard of Clairvaux Church		10755 N 124th St, Scottsdale	Founded in 1994, church dedicated in 1998
St. Bridget Church		2213 N Lindsay Rd, Mesa	
St. Catherine of Siena Church		6200 S Central Ave, Phoenix	
St. Charles Borromeo Church		8615 W Peoria Ave,Peoria	
St. Clare of Assisi Church		17111 W Bell Rd,Surprise	Parish founded in 2000, church dedicated in 2008
St. Clement of Rome Church		15800 N Del Webb Blvd, Sun City	
St. Columba Kim Korean Mission		1375 N McClintock Dr, Chandler	Current church dedicated in 2010
St. Daniel the Prophet Church		1030 Hayden Rd, Scottsdale	
St. Dominic Mission		25603 N Danny Ln UNIT 2, – Rio Verde	
St. Edward the Confessor Church		4410 E Southern Ave, Phoenix	
St. Elizabeth Seton Church		9728 W Palmeras Dr, Sun City	
St. Francis of Assisi Mission		St. Francis of Assisi Mission – Salt River Pima-Maricopa Indian Community	
St. Francis Xavier Church		4715 N Central Ave, Phoenix	
St. Gabriel the Archangel Church		32648 N Cave Creek Rd, Cave Creek	
St. Gregory Church		3424 N 18th Ave, Phoenix	
St. Helen Church		5510 W Cholla St, Glendale	
St. Henry Church		24750 W Lower Buckeye Rd, Buckeye	Founded in 1906 as a mission, became a parish in 1956, current church dedicated in 1981
St. James Church		19640 N 35th Ave, Glendale	
St. Jerome Church		10815 N 35th Ave, Phoenix	
St. Joachim and St. Anne Church		11625 N 111th Ave, Sun City	
St. Joan of Arc Church		3801 E Greenway Rd, Phoenix	
St. John the Baptist Mission		5407 W Pecos Rd, Laveen Village	
St. John Vianney Church		800 W Loma Linda Blvd, Goodyear	
St. Joseph Church		11001 N 40th St, Phoenix	
St. Louis the King Church		4331 W Maryland Ave, Glendale	
San Lucy Chapel		B St, Gila Bend	
St. Luke Church		19644 N 7th Ave, Phoenix	
St. Margaret Church		2435 E McArthur Dr, Tempe	
St. Mark Church		400 N 30th St, Phoenix	
St. Maria Goretti Church		6261 N Granite Reef Rd, Scottsdale	
St. Martin de Porres Church		3851 W Wier Ave, Phoenix	
St. Mary's Basilica		231 N 3rd St, Phoenix	
St. Mary's Parish		St. Juan Diego Church, 3200 S Cooper Rd, Chandler	Merged with St. Mary
		St. Mary Church – Chandler	Merged with St. Juan Diego
St. Mary Magdalene Church		2654 E Williams Field Rd, Gilbert	
St. Matthew Church		320 N 20th Dr, Phoenix	
St. Michael Mission		314 Dodson St, Gila Bend	
St. Paschal Baylon Chapel		400 E. Oak. Scottsdale	
St. Patrick Catholic Community		10815 N 84th St, Scottsdale	
St. Paul Church		330 W Coral Gables Dr, Phoenix	
St. Philip Benizi Mission		34621 Old Black Canyon Hwy, Black Canyon City	
St. Rose Philippine Duchesne Church		2825 W Rose Canyon Cir, Anthem	
St. Steven Church		24827 S Dobson Rd,Sun Lakes	Founded as St. Michael's mission in 1981, later changed to St. Steven. Became a parish in 1988, church dedicated in 1990.
St. Theresa Church		5045 E Thomas Rd, Phoenix	
St. Thomas the Apostle Church		2312 E Campbell Ave, Phoenix	
St. Thomas Aquinas Church		13720 W Thomas Rd, Avondale	Founded as a mission in 1923 in Litchfield Park and became a parish in 1975, current church dedicated in 2003
St. Thomas More Church		6180 W Utopia Rd, Glendale	
St. Timothy Church		1730 W Guadalupe Rd, Mesa	
St. Vincent de Paul Church		3140 N 51st Ave, Phoenix	
St. William Church		11001 W 3rd St, Cashion	
Vietnamese Martyrs Church		2915 W Northern Ave, Phoenix	Founded in 2004

== Pinal County ==
Church or mission name	Image	Address	Description
Holy Family Mission		W Arrow Weed Rd, Blackwater	
Our Lady of Victory Mission		Mish Ki Rd, Sacaton Flats	
St. Anne Mission		AZ-87, Santan	
St. Anthony Mission		47 Sacaton Rd, Sacaton	Founded in the 1920s, current church dedicated in 2024
St. Catherine Mission		3986 S Santa Cruz Rd, Laveen Village	
St. Peter Church		1500 N. St. Peter Rd, Bapchule	

== Yavapai County ==
Church or mission name	Image	Address	Description
Good Shepherd of the Desert Mission		26750 S. Congress Way, Congress	
Immaculate Conception Church		700 N Bill Gray Rd, Cottonwood	Founded in 1930, current church dedicated in 2009
		St. Cecilia Mission, 850 Main St,Clarkdale	Founded in 1824, became a mission of immaculate Conception Church in 1971
Sacred Heart Church		150 Fleury St,Prescott	Founded in 1875, oldest parish in the diocese. Operated by the Society of Divine Word.
St. Catherine Laboure Church		2062 AZ-89, Chino Valley	Founded as a mission in 1976, current church dedicated in 1991
St. Francis of Assisi Church		216 Cook St, Bagdad	
St. Frances Cabrini Church		781 Cliffs Pkwy,Camp Verde	
St. Germaine Church		7997 E Dana Dr,Prescott Valley	Founded as a mission church in 1979, current church dedicated in 1982, became a parish in 1984.
St. John Vianney Church		180 St John Vianney Ln, Sedona	Founded in 1956
St. Joseph Mission		10901 AZ-69, Mayer	

== Coconino County ==
Church or mission name	Image	Address	Description
Chapel of the Holy Cross		780 Chapel Rd, Sedona	Constructed in 1958
El Cristo Rey Mission		44 Albright Ave, Grand Canyon Village	Constructed in 1970, located in Grand Canyon National Park
Holy Trinity Newman Center		520 W Riordan Rd, Flagstaff	Founded in the 1930s, became a parish in 2013. Located at Northern Arizona University
San Francisco de Asis Church		1600 E Rte 66, Flagstaff	
		Our Lady of Guadalupe Chapel224 S Kendrick St, Flagstaff	Constructed in 1925. Now operated by San Francisco de Asis Parish
St. Francis Church		22440 Schoeney,Seligman	Combined with St. Joseph
St. Joseph the Worker, St. Francis & St. Anne		900 W Grant Ave,Williams	Combined with St. Francis

== Mohave County ==
Church or mission name	Image	Address	Description
La Santisima Trinidad Mission		3735 S Scenic BlvdLittlefield	
Our Lady of the Lake Church		1975 Daytona Ave, Lake Havasu City	Current church dedicated in 2004
St. Margaret Mary Church		1691 N Oatman Rd, Bullhead City	Founded as mission in 1947, became a parish in 1976, current church dedicated in 1911
St. Mary Church		301 E Spring St, Kingman	Current church dedicated in 1967
		Our Lady of the Desert Mission, 5385 Pierce Ferry Rd, Dolan Springs	Operated by St. Mary Parish

== Closed churches ==
Church name	Image	Address	Description
Nativity of the Blessed Virgin Mary Chapel		Flagstaff	Constructed in 1888, now a historic building
