= Peter Dai Bui =

Vietnamese American Catholic prelate (born 1970)

His Excellency, The Most Reverend Peter Dai Bui KCHS
- Auxiliary Bishop of Phoenix
- Native name: Phêrô Bùi Đại
- Church: Catholic
- Diocese: Phoenix
- Appointed: December 19, 2025
- Installed: February 17, 2026
- Other post: Titular Bishop of Ausafa

Orders
- Ordination: December 24, 2003
- Consecration: February 17, 2026 by John P. Dolan, Thomas Olmsted, and Eduardo Nevares

Personal details
- Born: Bùi Đại; January 11, 1970 (age 56) Phú Quốc, Republic of Vietnam
- Education: Pontifical Athenaeum Regina Apostolorum
- Motto: Omnia in caritate fiant (Let all that you do be done in love) (Hãy làm mọi sự vì đức ái)
- Styles
- Reference style: His Excellency; The Most Reverend
- Spoken style: Your Excellency
- Religious style: Bishop

Peter Dai Bui (born January 11, 1970) is a Vietnamese-born American Catholic prelate serving as auxiliary bishop of the Diocese of Phoenix in Arizona since 2026.

== Biography ==
=== Early life ===
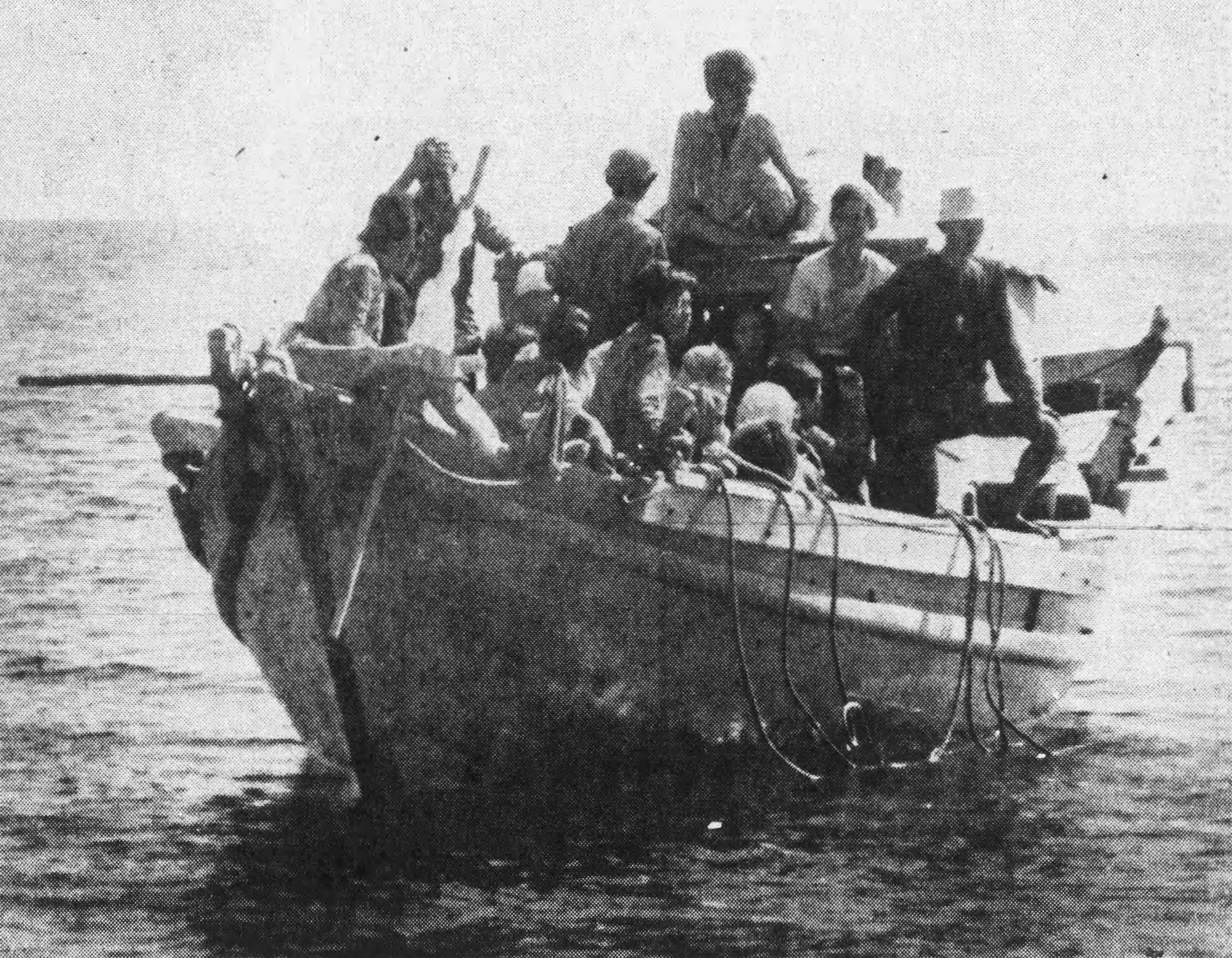
Bui, along with 48 relatives and neighbors, as photographed by Eddie Adams during their 1977 escape from Vietnam.

Bùi Đại was born on January 11, 1970, on the island of Phú Quốc, in what was then South Vietnam. His father was a fisherman, and he grew up as one of 12 children. When Bui was 6 years old, he and his family were among the boat people who fled Vietnam after the Vietnam War. 49 relatives and neighbors, including Bui's family, fled in his father's fishing boat and were at sea for three days. While at sea, pirates demanded their valuables. Eventually, the whole group arrived in Bangkok and received assistance. Bui and his family were flown to and settled in Houston. A short time after, they moved to New Orleans, where some of his family still resides.

Deciding to enter the priesthood, Bui entered the Legion of Christ's novitiate in 1989. During that time, he studied at the minor seminary in Cheshire, Connecticut and made his first profession of vows in 1991. He studied at Pontifical Athenaeum Regina Apostolorum in Rome, completing seminary studies in philosophy and theology. He also earned a licentiate in philosophy.

=== Priesthood ===
Bui was ordained a priest for the Legion of Christ on December 24, 2003. While a Legion of Christ priest, he served as the chaplain of a Catholic high school in Caracas, Venezuela. He also organized international mission trips to Amazonia and Medellín, Colombia.

In 2007, Bui was appointed to Our Lady of Guadalupe Parish (Queen Creek) in the Diocese of Phoenix. The parish was affiliated with the Legion of Christ, but during his service there, he ultimately decided to leave the Legion. He later became associate pastor at Christ the King Parish (Mesa) from 2008 to 2010. During his term there, he was officially incardinated a priest of Phoenix in 2009. Starting in 2010, he was made pastor at Resurrection Parish in Tempe. After a few months there, he was offered a role as an official of the Pontifical Council Cor Unum through the encouragement and endorsement of Bishop Thomas Olmsted.

Bui accepted the role and served the Holy See on the Council for five years from 2011 to 2016. He compared his administrative position with service in the missions saying, "You can make of your desk an altar, to make an offering to the Lord". Due to his service at Cor Unum and the recommendation of Cardinal Robert Sarah, Bui was named a Chaplain to His Holiness by Pope Francis on December 16, 2014, receiving the title Monsignor. While serving in Rome, Bui helped arrange a 2015 meeting between Pope Francis and the Harlem Globetrotters.

Following his return from Rome, Bui was appointed theological consultant to the bishops of Phoenix in 2017. Also in 2017, he coordinated a 54-day novena and diocesan consecration to the Immaculate Heart of Mary. This devotion called for penance and prayer in the face of war and the issues of pornography and abortion, which Bui called "attacks on the family." He was also made pastor at Holy Spirit Parish (Tempe) that year and served there until 2022, when he began his role as vicar for clergy for the diocese.

On November 15, 2022, Bui led a prayer vigil at St. Mary's Basilica to abolish the death penalty in Arizona. This service took place the evening before Murray Hooper's execution.

=== Auxiliary Bishop of Phoenix ===
On December 19, 2025, Pope Leo XIV appointed Bui as auxiliary bishop of Phoenix and titular bishop of Ausafa. He is only the second auxiliary in Phoenix's history, following Bishop Eduardo Nevares. He also became the fifth Vietnamese American bishop. He will continue to serve as Vicar for Clergy while auxiliary bishop. Bui's episcopal consecration occurred on February 17, 2026 at Saint Thomas Aquinas Parish in Avondale. The Mass was celebrated by Bishop John P. Dolan, with the assistance of Auxiliary Bishop Nevares and Bishop emeritus Olmsted.

=== Personal life ===
Bui is fluent in many languages, including Spanish, German, Italian, English, and Vietnamese.

In 2022, Bui was invested as a Knight of the Holy Sepulchre.

== Episcopal succession ==
Catholic Church titles
Preceded by -	Auxiliary Bishop of Phoenix; 2026-present	Succeeded by -
