= St. Mary's Basilica (Phoenix) =

Historic Catholic church in Arizona, United States

Basilica of the Immaculate Conception
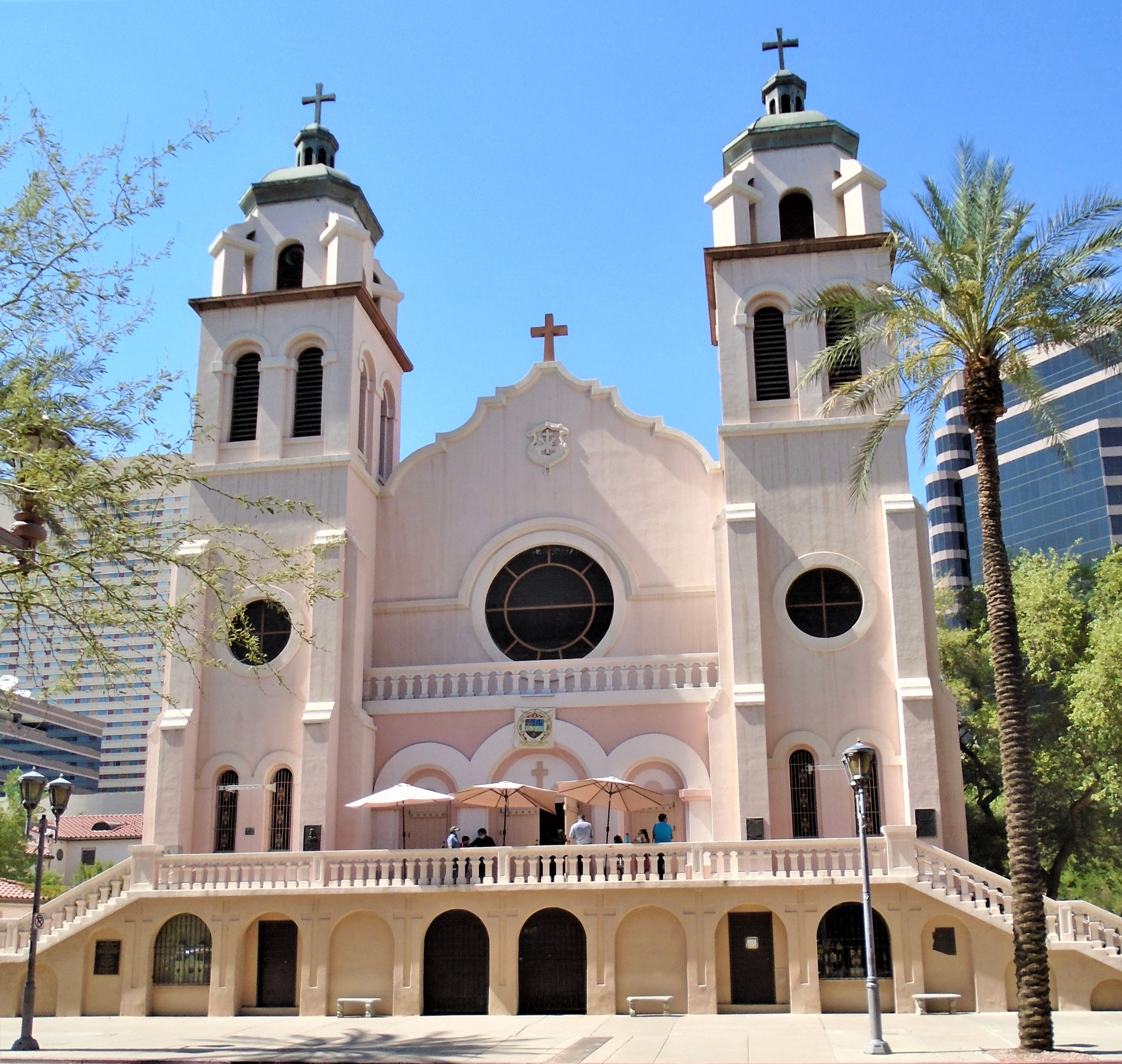
- St. Mary's Basilica in 2021
- Basilica of the Immaculate Conception
- Location: Phoenix, Arizona
- Country: United States
- Denomination: Catholic Church
- Tradition: Latin Church
- Website: St. Mary's Basilica

History
- Dedication: Mary, mother of Jesus
- Dedicated: 1915

Architecture
- Functional status: Active
- Architect(s): Leonard Darscheid; R. A. Gray & George Gallagher
- Style: Mission Revival/Spanish Colonial Revival

Administration
- Diocese: Diocese of Phoenix
- St. Mary's Church
- U.S. National Register of Historic Places
- Location within Arizona
- Location: 231 N. 3rd St., Phoenix, Arizona
- Coordinates: 33°27′03″N 112°04′10″W
- Area: 0.3 acres (0.12 ha)
- Built: 1902–1914
- NRHP reference No.: 78000551
- Added to NRHP: November 29, 1978

The Basilica of the Immaculate Conception of the Blessed Virgin Mary, also known as St. Mary's Basilica, is a Roman Catholic basilica located in Phoenix, Arizona. It was previously known as St. Mary's Church. It was built from 1902 to 1914 in a combination of the Mission Revival and Spanish Colonial Revival styles, and was dedicated in 1915. It replaced an earlier adobe church built in 1881 when the parish was founded. From 1895 the parish was staffed by the Franciscan Friars, but it is currently staffed and operated by clergy of the Diocese of Phoenix.

Pope John Paul II raised the shrine to the status of Minor Basilica via his decree Una Propemodum Voce on 2 September 1985. The decree was signed and notarized by Cardinal Agostino Casaroli.

The oldest Catholic parish church in the greater Phoenix area, St. Mary's was the only parish in Phoenix until 1924 and is home to Arizona's largest stained glass windows collection and a 26-rank pipe organ built by the Schantz Organ Company.

== Architecture ==
The church's structure supports four domes spanning the length of the basilica. All the domes are compound design with the pendentives, following Roman architecture, transferring the weight of the roof to the pillars. The dome over the intercept point of the crossover, the nave center aisle and the apse, is topped with stained glass and features a lantern above the dome to emit light into the nave and sanctuary. The dome located over the altar is topped with a cupola designed to provide light to the altar. The two bell towers are topped with onion shaped domes, typical of the churches of Bavaria and Austria, where Novatus Benzing, the pastor at the time, and Leonard Darscheid, the architectural consultant, both originated. The towers house four bells which ring daily. The large upper windows depict scenes from the life of the Blessed Virgin Mary, while the lower nave and transept windows depict images of popular saints of the Franciscan Order and of the heritage of the cultures represented in the community at the time (German, Spanish, Irish).

According to its National Register nomination, "All stained glass was done by Emil Frei Art Glass Company of St. Louis. The Stations of the Cross, cast in high relief on gold background, were made by Andrew Kaletta Company of St. Louis. The woodwork and pews, all of oak, were made by Theodore Kuntz of Cleveland."

The design for the church was developed while it was under direction of the Franciscan Fathers of the Sacred Heart Province of St. Louis, Missouri. One source describes its architecture as Mission Revival with some Romanesque features; that source and another indicate that plans for the church evolved from Gothic Revival sketches by pastor Novatus Benzing. Upon request for consulting, Franciscan Father Leonard Darscheid of St. Louis "added a number of features, including the design for the baptismal font, to what at that point was a gothic plan". In its detail it was designed by parishioner and architect George Gallagher (architect) and design was completed by Gallagher's partner R. A. Gray (architect). It was built, at least partially (including its basement), by contractor W. J. Ripley.

The building was added to the National Register of Historic Places in 1978, deemed significant for its architecture, as "St. Mary's Church". The building was deemed architecturally significant "as the largest, earliest, and most impressive Mission Revival structure in Arizona."

== Basilica ==
Pope John Paul II elevated St. Mary's to the rank of a minor basilica in 1985, two years before his visit to Phoenix in 1987, when he visited St. Mary's and addressed crowds of thousands from the balcony on the facade. The principal symbols of its status as a basilica – the tintinnabulum (large bell on a column) and the ombrellone (large gold and red umbrella) – are displayed in the sanctuary. St. Mary's became the 32nd basilica in the United States and remains the only basilica in Arizona. The church, a Phoenix Points of Pride, is located at the northeast corner of North 3rd Street and Monroe in downtown Phoenix, a carillon of the Copper Square.

== Clergy and staff ==
Until 2023, the basilica was staffed by the Franciscan Friars of the province of Saint Barbara, whose coat of arms and various symbolism can be found displayed prominently throughout the building. On September 13, 2022, the Franciscans announced they would be withdrawing from the basilica, due to falling numbers of clergy and a national change in governance structure. On July 1, 2023, the Diocese of Phoenix officially took over leadership of St. Mary's from the Franciscans when the Franciscans presented and handed over the keys of the basilica to Bishop John P. Dolan of the Diocese of Phoenix.

On October 15, 2023, Fr. John Muir of the Diocese of Phoenix was officially installed as rector of St. Mary's Basilica by Bishop Dolan. Fr. Muir also serves as the Moderator of the Curia and Vicar General of the Diocese of Phoenix.

Due to the centrality of its location and its historical importance, many of the important liturgical events of the Diocese of Phoenix are split between the basilica and the Cathedral of Saints Simon and Jude, with the bishop of Phoenix as the principal celebrant.

== Gallery ==
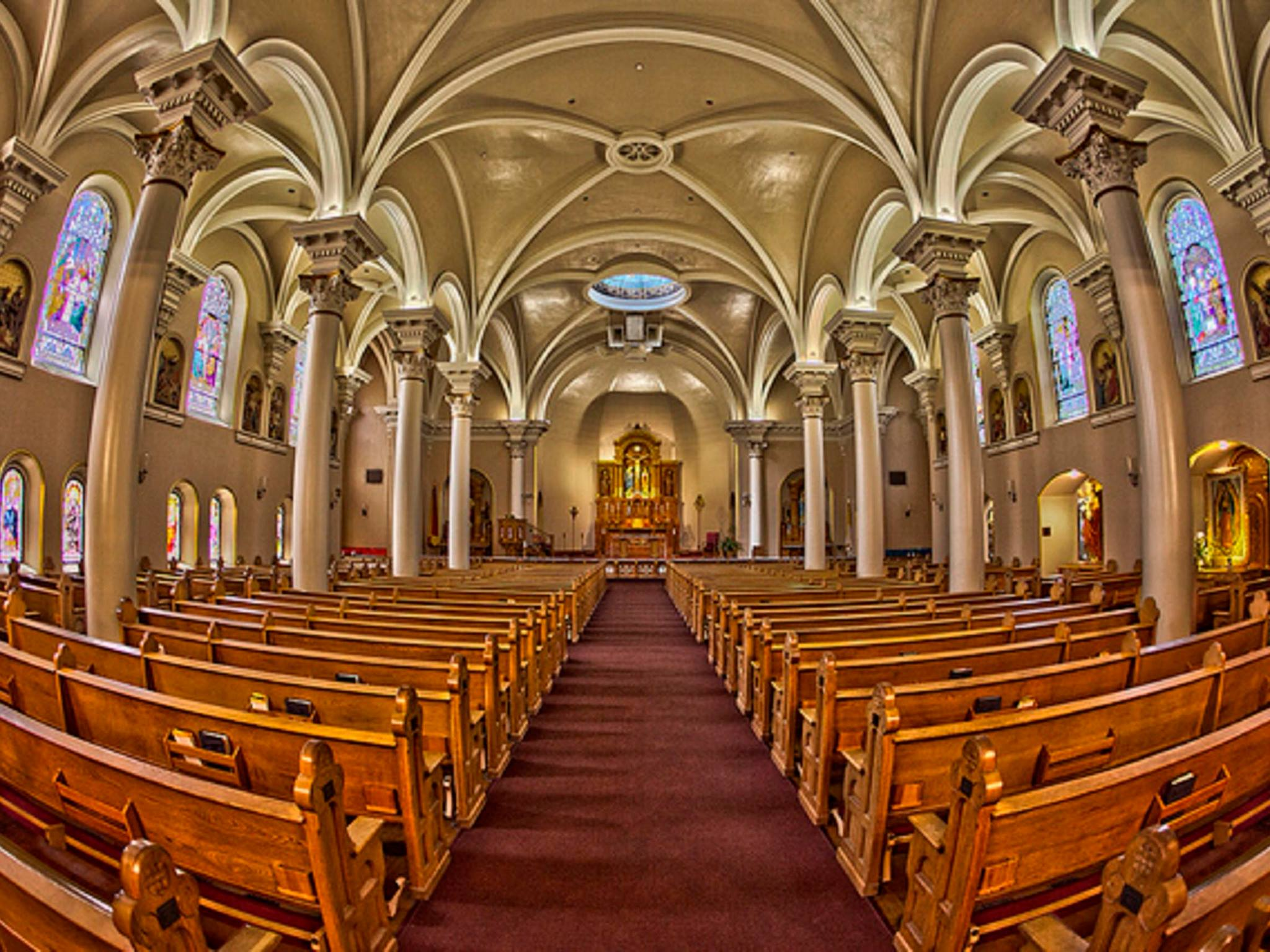
Interior of St. Mary's Basilica

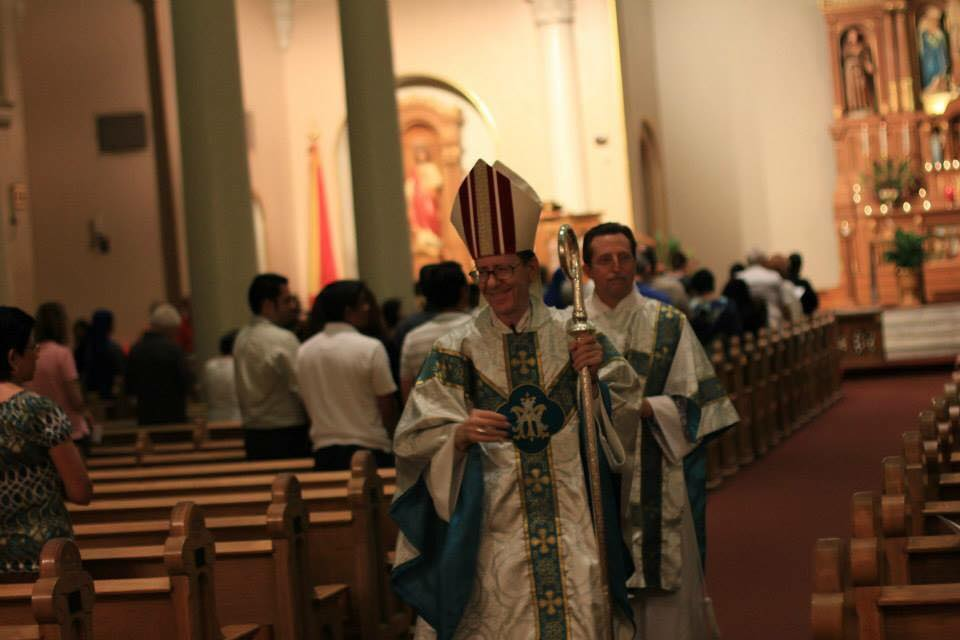
Bishop Thomas Olmsted celebrating Mass in the Basilica

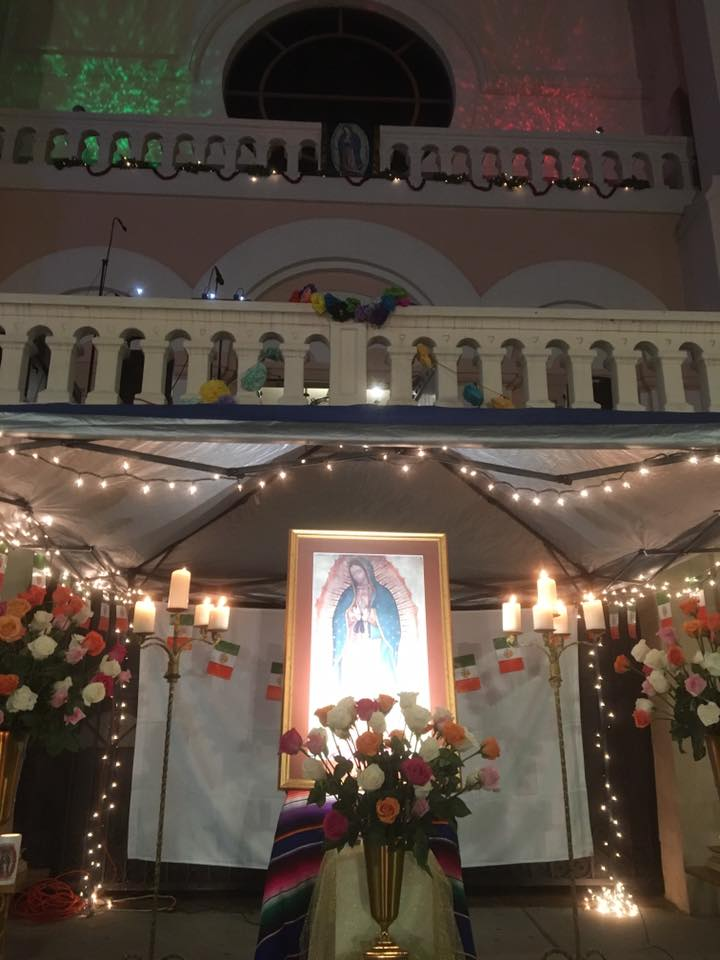
Celebrations for the Feast of Nuestra Señora de Guadalupe outside the Basilica on December 12

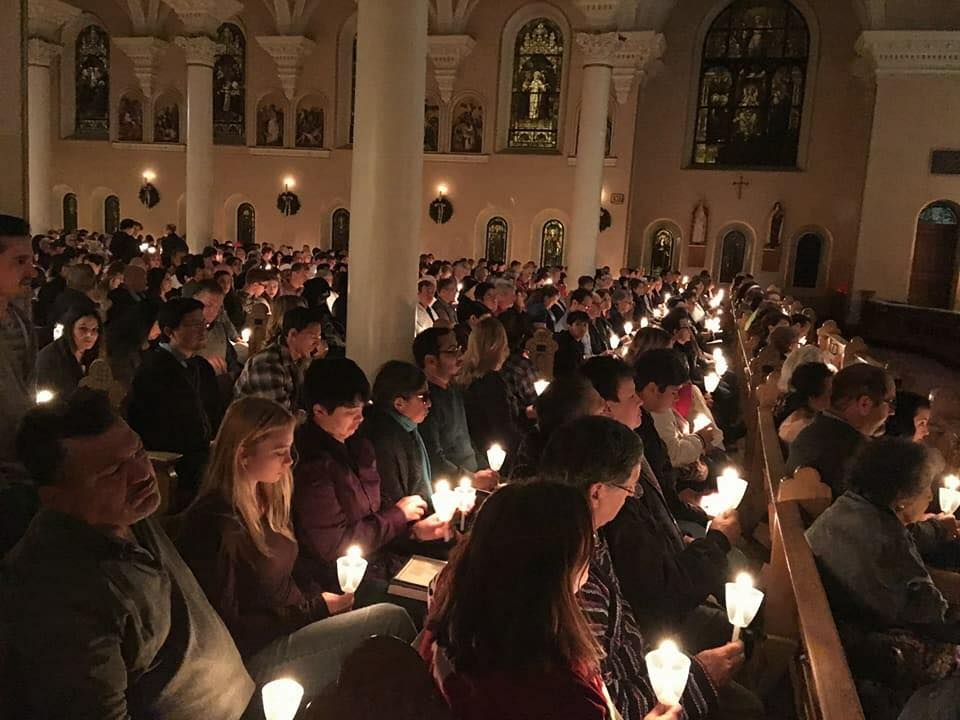
Christmas Midnight Mass at St. Mary's Basilica

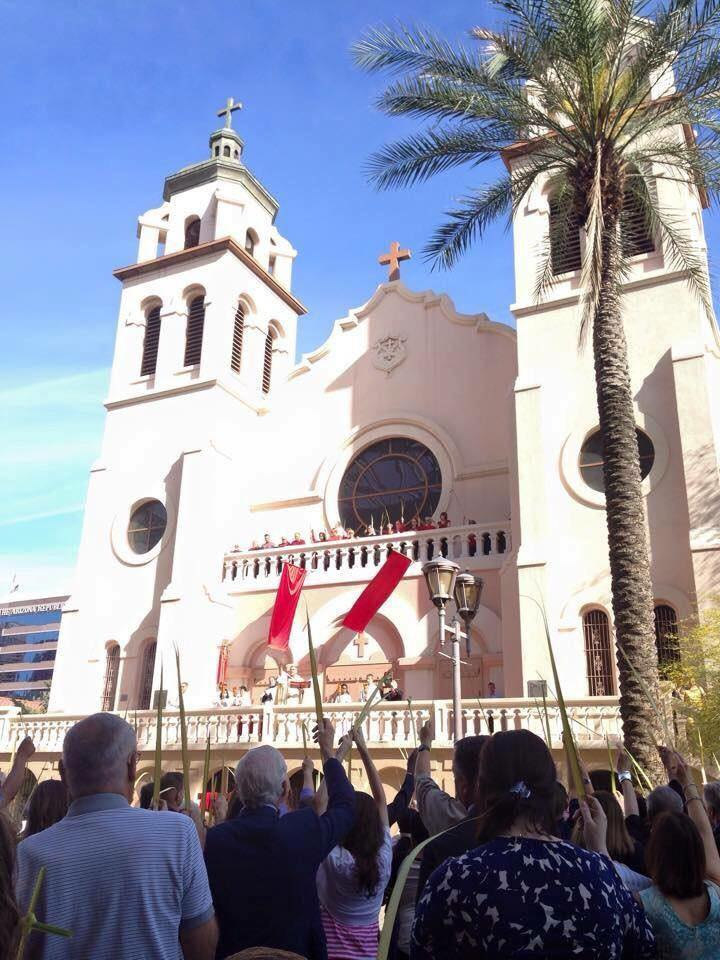
Palm Sunday Mass taking place outside Saint Mary's Basilica

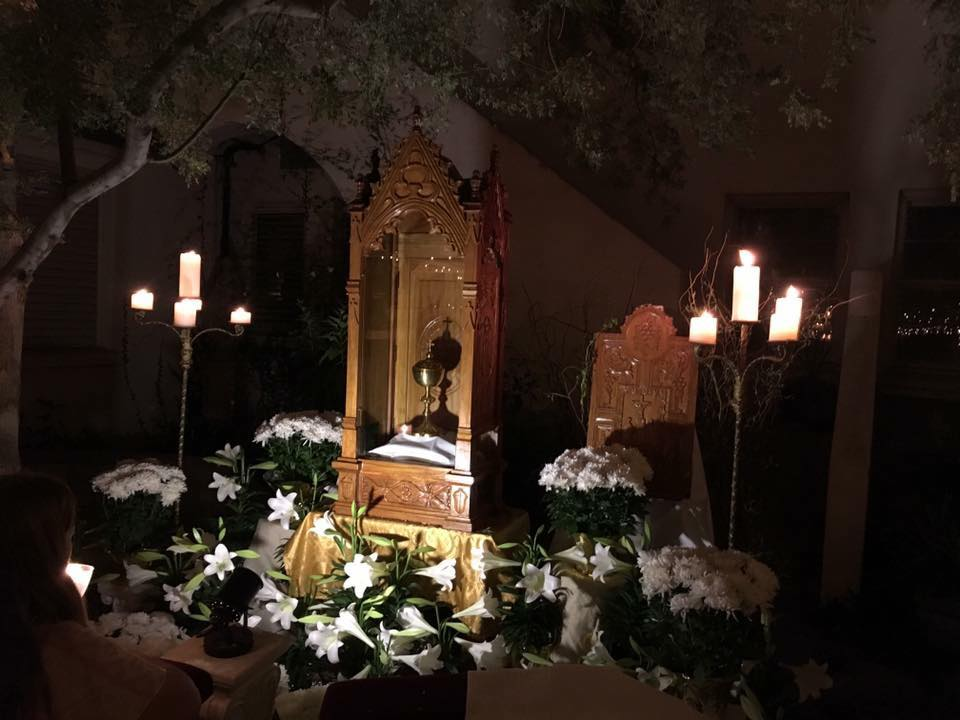
Holy Week/Semana Santa services at the Basilica

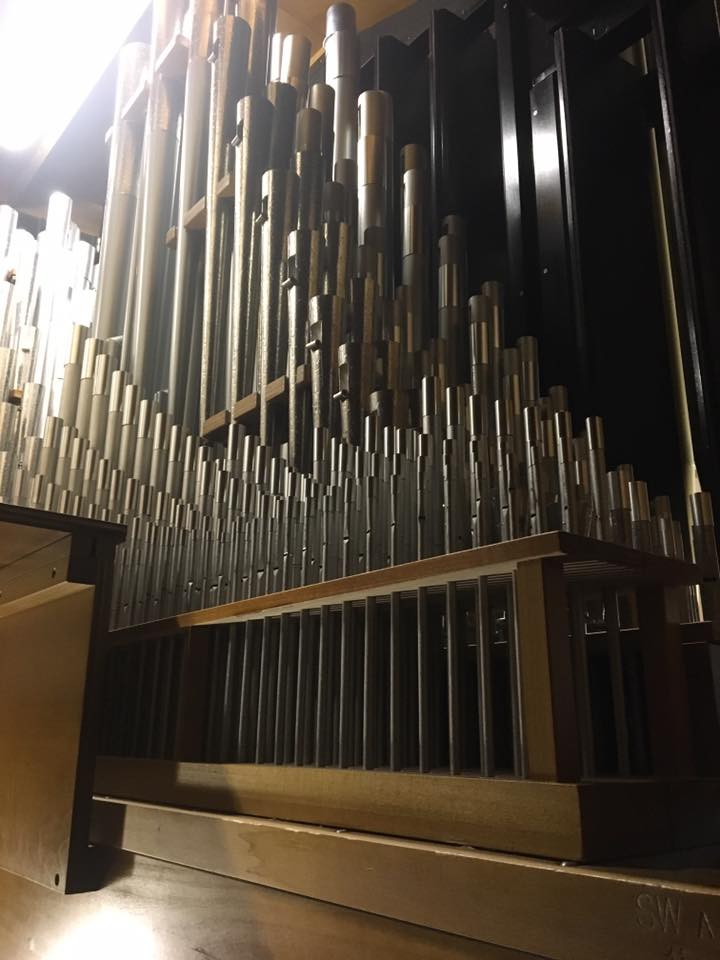
Pipes inside the Basilica Organ

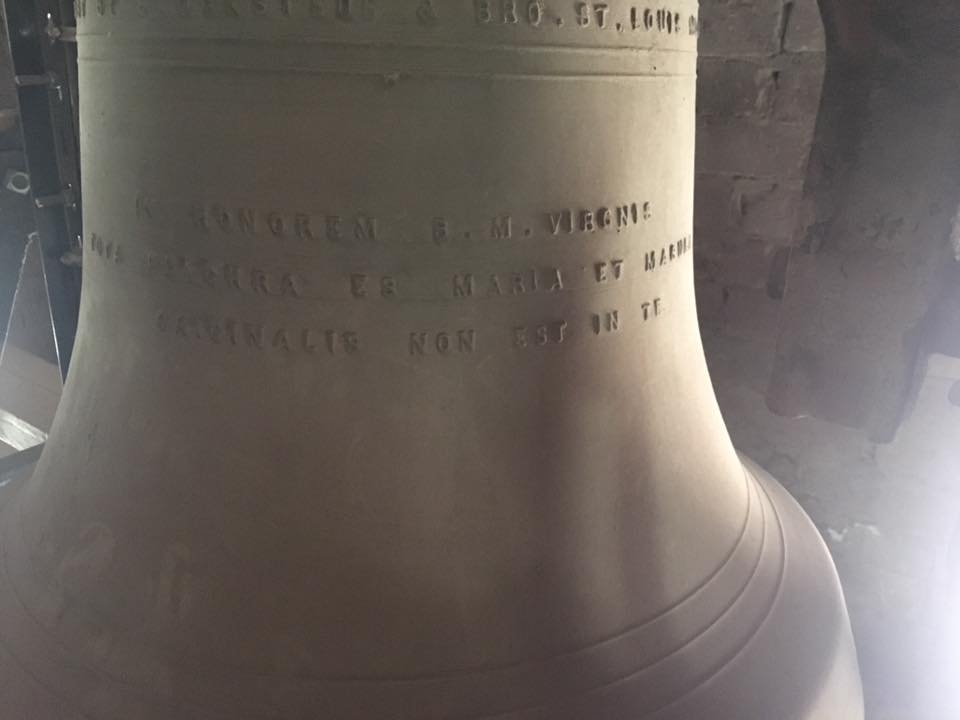
Latin inscription on the bell dedicated to the Immaculate Conception of the Blessed Virgin Mary

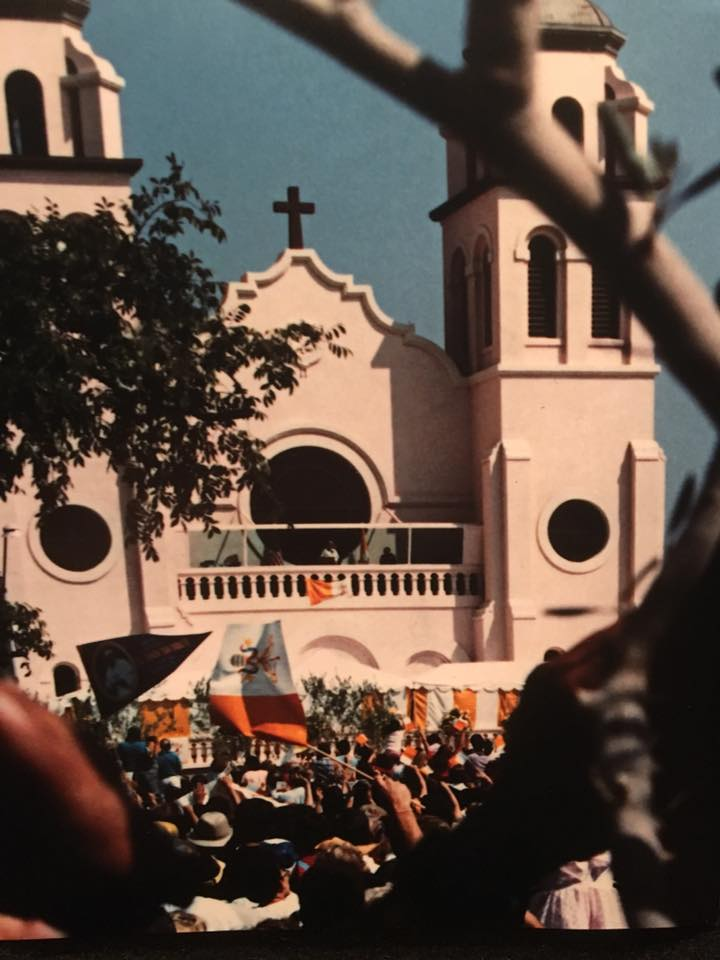
Pope John Paul II visiting St. Mary's Basilica in 1987

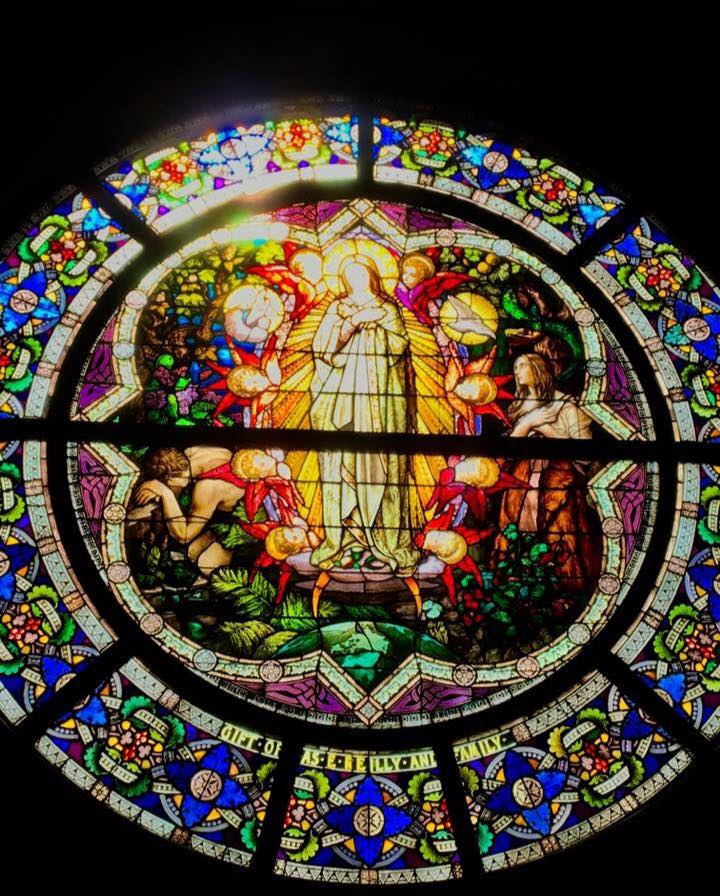
The Basilica Rose Window

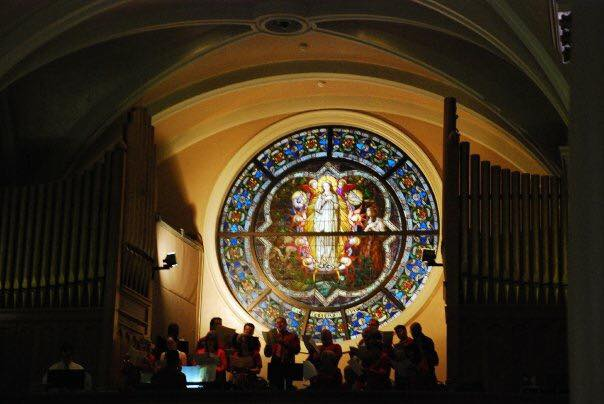
Pipe Organ, Choir and Rose Window
Stained glass

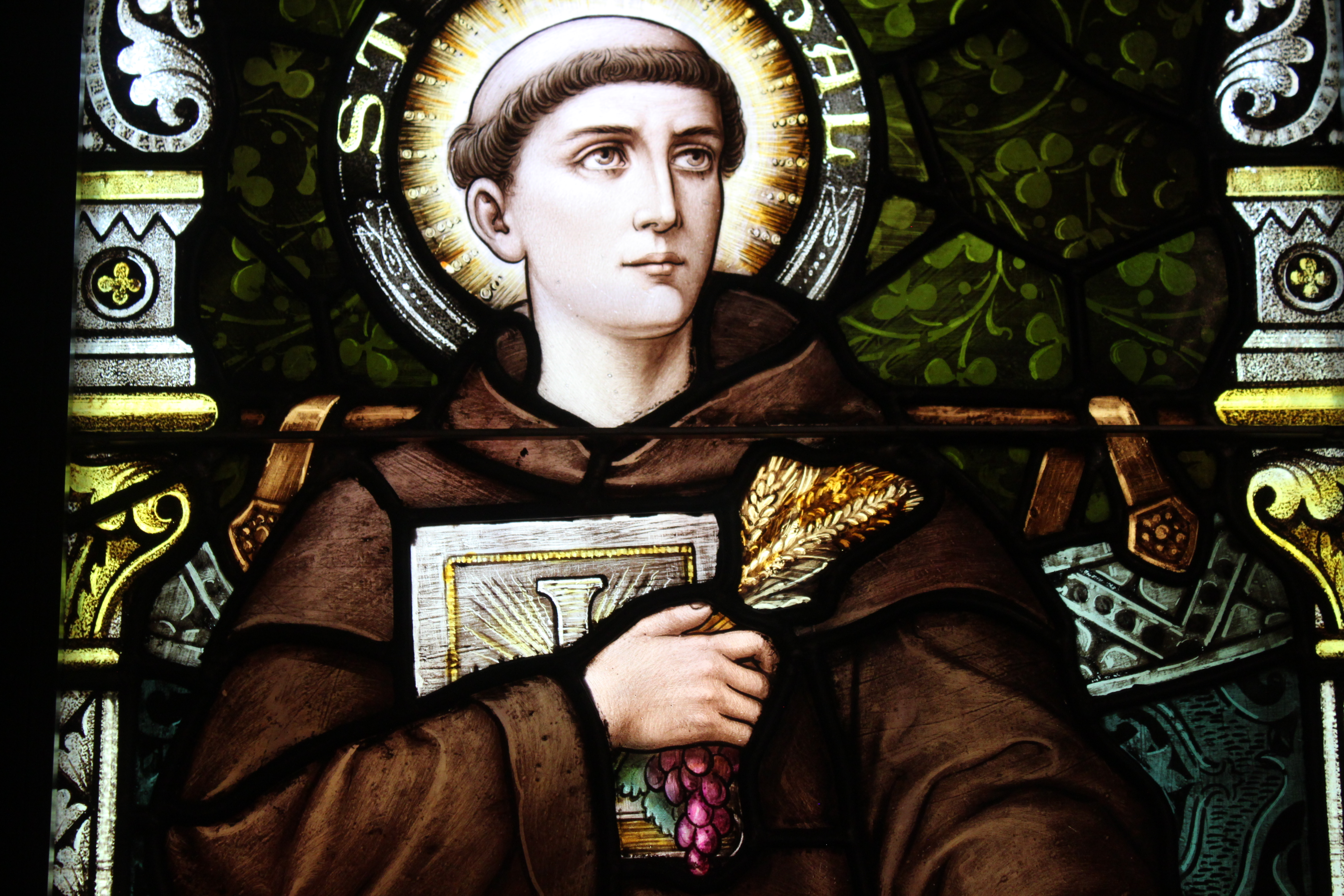

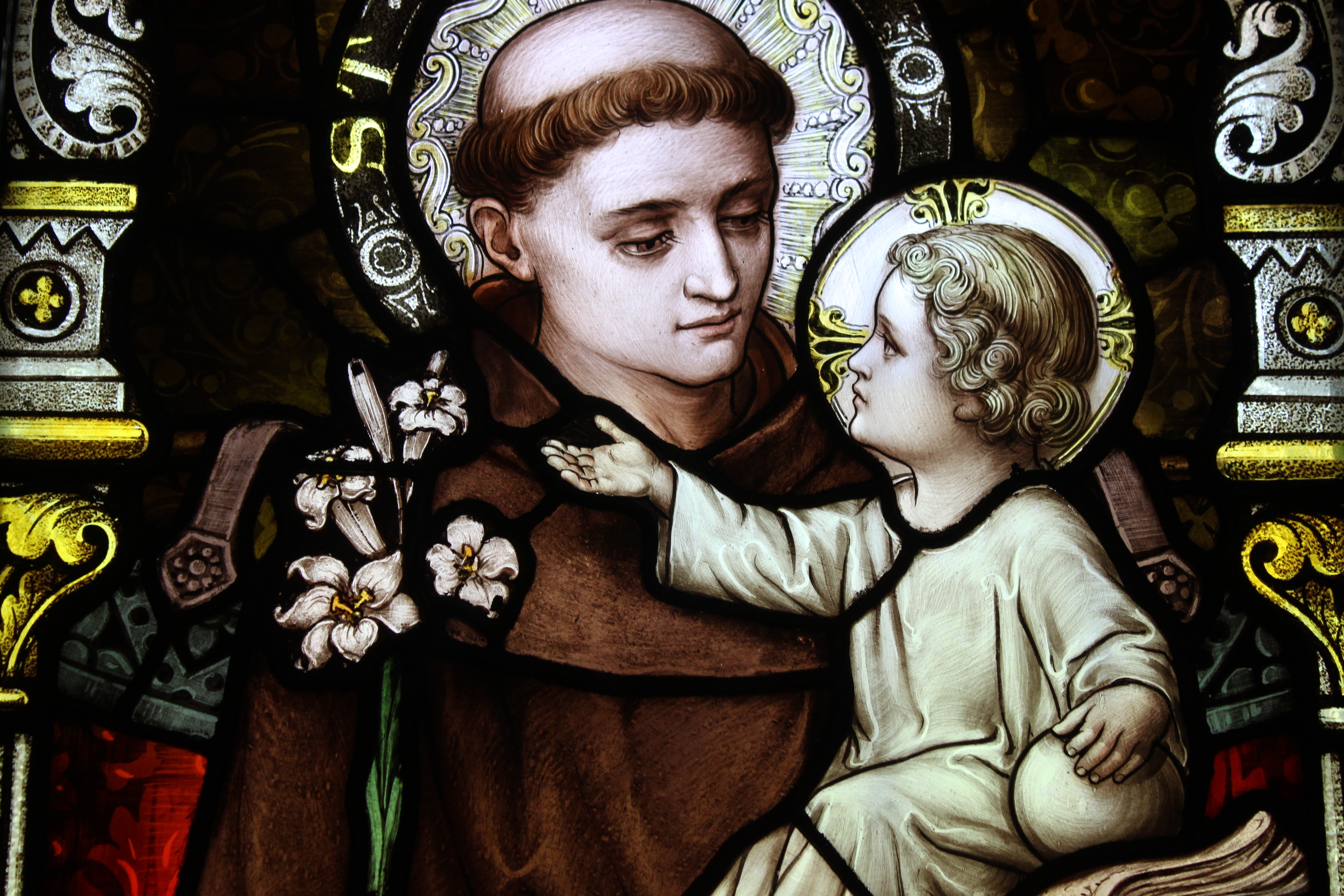

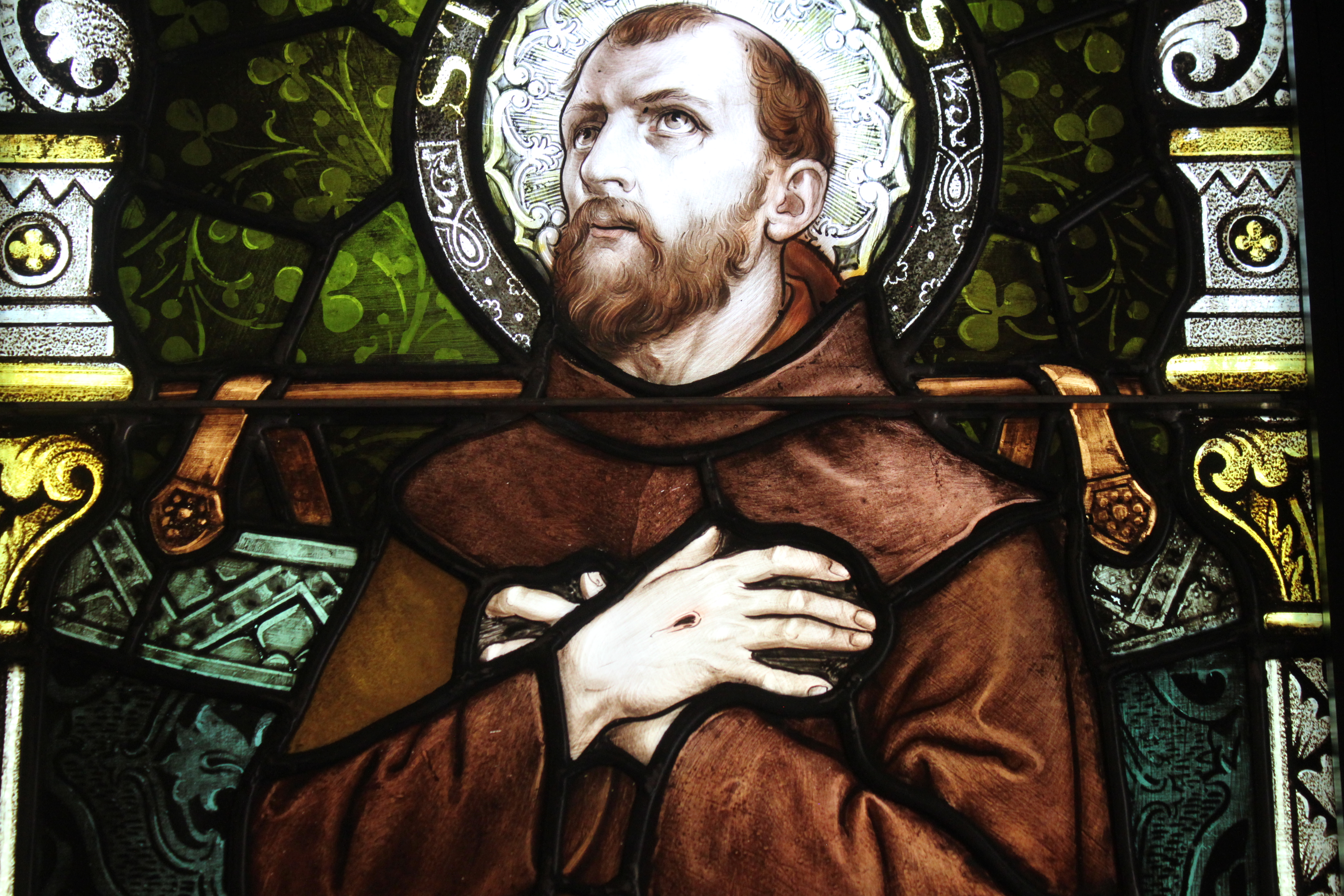

== See also ==
- Basilicas in the United States
- List of historic properties in Phoenix, Arizona
