= Old St. Mary's Church (Tempe, Arizona) =

Historic church in Arizona, United States

- Our Lady of Mount Carmel Church (Old St. Mary's Church)
- U.S. National Register of Historic Places
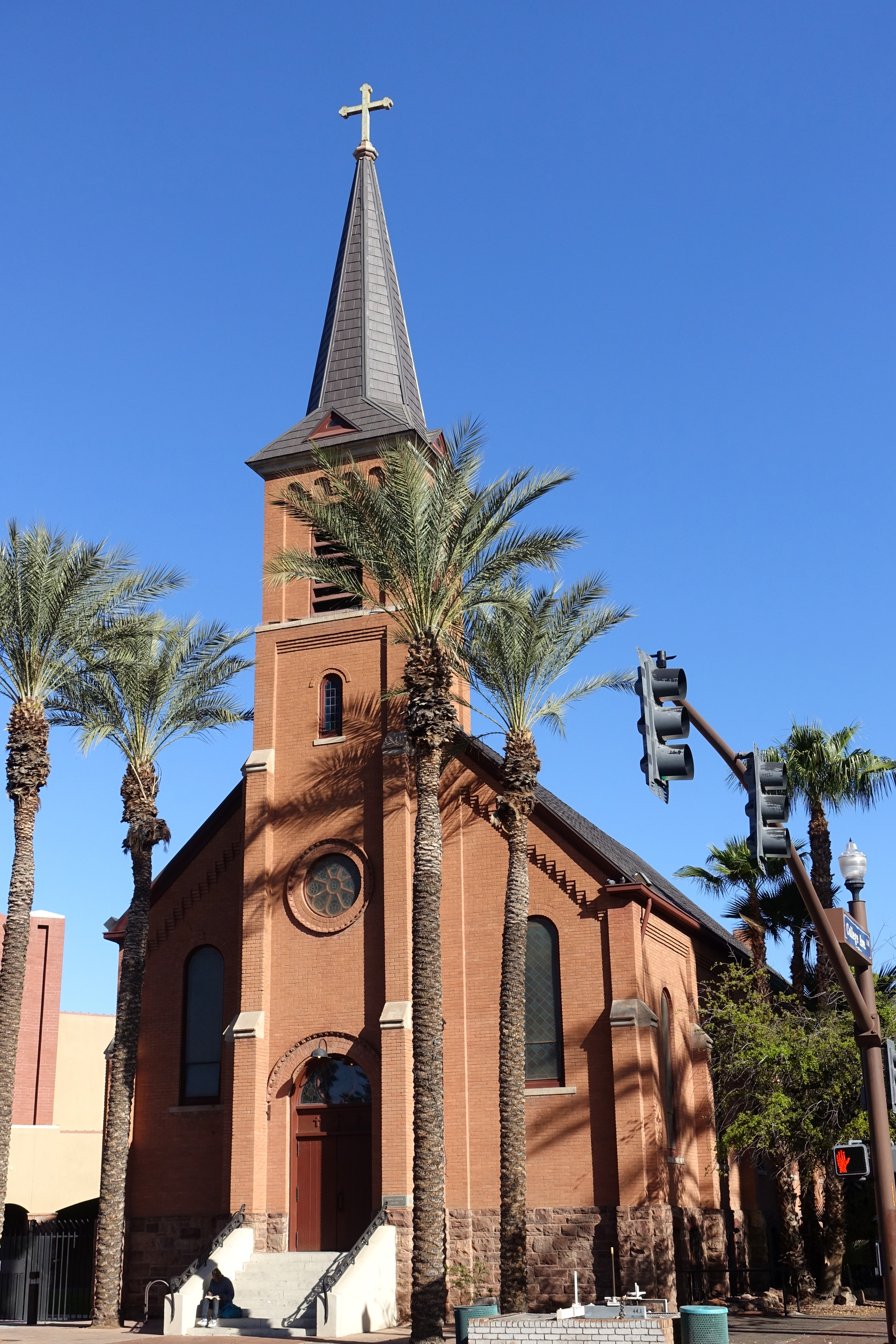
- (2018)

- Location within Arizona Location within the United States
- Location: 230 E. University Ave., Tempe, Arizona
- Coordinates: 33°25′20″N 111°56′4″W
- Area: 0.5 acres (0.20 ha)
- Built: 1903
- Architect: Father Severin Westhoff
- Architectural style: Romanesque Revival
- NRHP reference No.: 78000552
- Added to NRHP: January 30, 1978

Old St. Mary's Church – formerly Our Lady of Mount Carmel Catholic Church, and also known as "The Old Church: – at 230 East University Avenue in Tempe, Arizona, is a historic church at the built in 1903 and designed in the Romanesque Revival style by Father Severin Westhoff. It is the longest standing church in the Phoenix metropolitan area and served as a Catholic parish for the Tempe area until 1968, when it became home to the Arizona State University Newman Center. It currently serves as home to Mary College at ASU, a center for Catholic Studies formed in partnership between the University of Mary and Arizona State University, the Diocese of Phoenix, and the All Saints Catholic Newman Center. The Newman Center's offices and chapel stand adjacent to the historic church.

The church was added to the National Register of Historic Places in 1978 under the name "Our Lady of Mount Carmel Church". It is the only example of Romanesque Revival architecture in the Tempe area, and one of only a few in Arizona.

== History and architecture ==
The current church, which was built in 1903, replaced an earlier adobe chapel, built in 1881 as a mission to serve the Mexican inhabitants of the village of San Pablo, which sat at the foot of Hayden Butte. By 1891, Tempe had become part of St. Mary's parish in Phoenix, and that name, "St. Mary's", appears on the cornerstone of the new brick church built to serve the growing number of Anglo members of the church, along with the older Mexican ones. With the exception of two trained brick layers hired from Phoenix, labor for the construction came from volunteers.

The structure, an example of Territorial Victorian Romanesque Revival architecture, was constructed with bricks fired with clay colored with red soil from Fort McDowell and stands on a foundation of stone quarried from the base of the butte. It is adorned with twelve tall arched stained glass windows, two in the front of the building, and five more on each side. There is a stained-glass fanlight above the door.

The building, which measures approximately 77 by 40 feet (23 m × 12 m), has a steep gabled roof and features a square bell tower with an octagonal steeple. The tower rises above the double-door entrance and houses a bell constructed in St. Louis in 1903 specially for the church. There is a choir loft above the vestibule and a full basement, which is partly below ground level.

The interior of the church was remodeled between 1937 and 1941, and a parish house constructed. In 1957, the growth of the congregation required that a new church be built, along with a rectory, school and convent, on 10 donated acres on Rural Road. The church building was sold to Newman Catholic Center in 1962 for $60,000. Services continued to be held in the building until 1968, when the city of Tempe would no longer allow large assemblies in the building. It was almost sold at one time to make way for a hamburger stand.

A 2019-2020 renovation of the interior undertaken by Mary College at ASU, in conjunction with the All Saints Catholic Newman Center, added a new paint scheme and a mural of Our Lady of Guadalupe emblazoned with her words to St. Juan Diego, “¿No estoy yo aquí, yo que tengo el honor de ser tu Madre?” (Am I not here, I who have the honor of being your mother?)

As home to Mary College at ASU, the historic church is now utilized as a study library, transformable into a lecture hall and event space. The lower level consists of classrooms, offices, and student computers.

== See also ==
- List of historic properties in Tempe, Arizona
