= Cathedral of Saints Simon and Jude (Phoenix, Arizona) =

Church in Arizona, United States

Saints Simon and Jude Cathedral
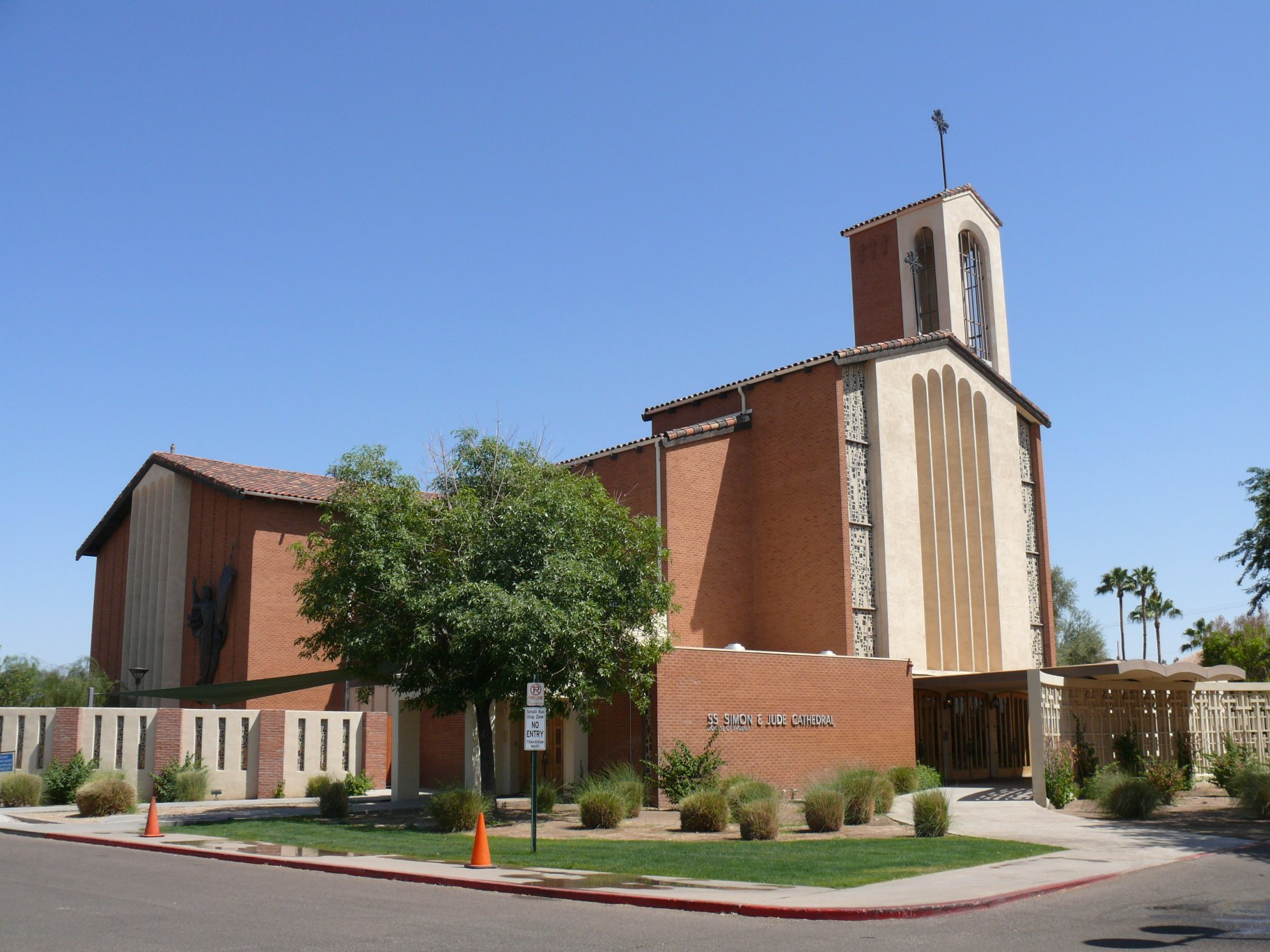

- Location in Arizona Saints Simon and Jude Cathedral (the United States)
- 33°31′47″N 112°06′58″W
- Location: 6351 North 27th Avenue; Phoenix, Arizona 85017
- Country: United States
- Denomination: Roman Catholic Church
- Website: www.simonjude.org

History
- Founded: May 15, 1953
- Dedication: Saint Simon the Zealot; Saint Jude Thaddeus
- Dedicated: December 11, 1966

Architecture
- Style: Modern
- Completed: 1966

Specifications
- Materials: Brick

Administration
- Diocese: Diocese of Phoenix

Clergy
- Bishop: Most Rev. John P. Dolan
- Rector: Very Rev. Matthew Henry

The Cathedral of Saints Simon and Jude is the cathedral of the Roman Catholic Diocese of Phoenix in Phoenix, Arizona, in the United States. As of 2025, the rector of the cathedral is Monsignor Matthew Henry.

== History ==
=== Saints Simon and Jude Church ===
On May 15, 1953, Bishop Daniel Gercke erected Saints Simon and Jude parish. At that time, the Phoenix area was still under the jurisdiction of the Diocese of Tucson. Smith celebrated masses in the Maryland School, a primary school in Phoenix, while building a church. That structure was dedicated on October 17, 1954.

By the 1960's the explosive growth of the Phoenix area necessitated the building of a larger church. The second Saints Simon and Jude Church was dedicated on December 11, 1966.

=== Saints Simon and Jude Cathedral ===
In 1969, Pope Paul VI erected the Diocese of Phoenix and elevated Saints Simon and Jude Church to Saints Simon and Jude Cathedral.

Pope John Paul II celebrated a mass at the cathedral on September 14, 1987, during his papal visit to the United States. In 1989, Mother Teresa spoke at Saints Simon and Jude on the occasion of establishing a branch of the Missionaries of Charity in Phoenix.

In 2016, the parish installed a new 51-rank pipe organ built by the Peragallo Pipe Organ Company of Paterson, New Jersey. It was the first pipe organ in the cathedral. In early 2021, the diocese closed Sts. Simon and Jude for its first renovation. New flooring and pews were installed in the nave, along with a hydraulic system for the kneelers to reduce their noise. The walls were repainted and the confessionals updated. The cathedral reopened in October 2021.

As of 2026, the rector of the cathedral is Reverend Matthew Henry and the cathedral is overseen by the bishop of Phoenix, Bishop John P. Dolan. The auxiliary bishop is Bishop Eduardo Alanis Nevares.

== Campus ==
The Saints Simon and Jude Cathedral School is located adjacent to the cathedral, along with the Mary Ward House.

Standing in front of the cathedral is a large cross over a dome-like structure. The cross stood over the temporary altar where John Paul II celebrated mass in 1987.

== Rectors ==
- Reverend Paul P. Smith, 1953 – unknown
- Reverend Michael McGovern, unknown – 1987
- Monsignor Richard Moyer, 1987 – 1990
- Monsignor Michael O'Grady, 1990 – 2005
- Reverend Robert Clements, 2005 – 2010
- Very Reverend John Lankeit, 2010 – 2021
- Very Reverend Fernando Camou, 2021 – 2024
- Very Reverend Matthew Henry, 2024 – present

== Saints Simon and Jude Cathedral School ==
Saints Simon and Jude Cathedral School is located on the cathedral property. It teaches pre-kindergarten through eighth grade and is staffed by the Sisters of Loreto.The school was founded in 1954 by Bishop Daniel Gercke and Rector Paul Smith. On August 20, 1954, four Sisters of Loreto from the Sisters of Loretto arrived from Navan, Ireland to staff the new school.

Cathedral images

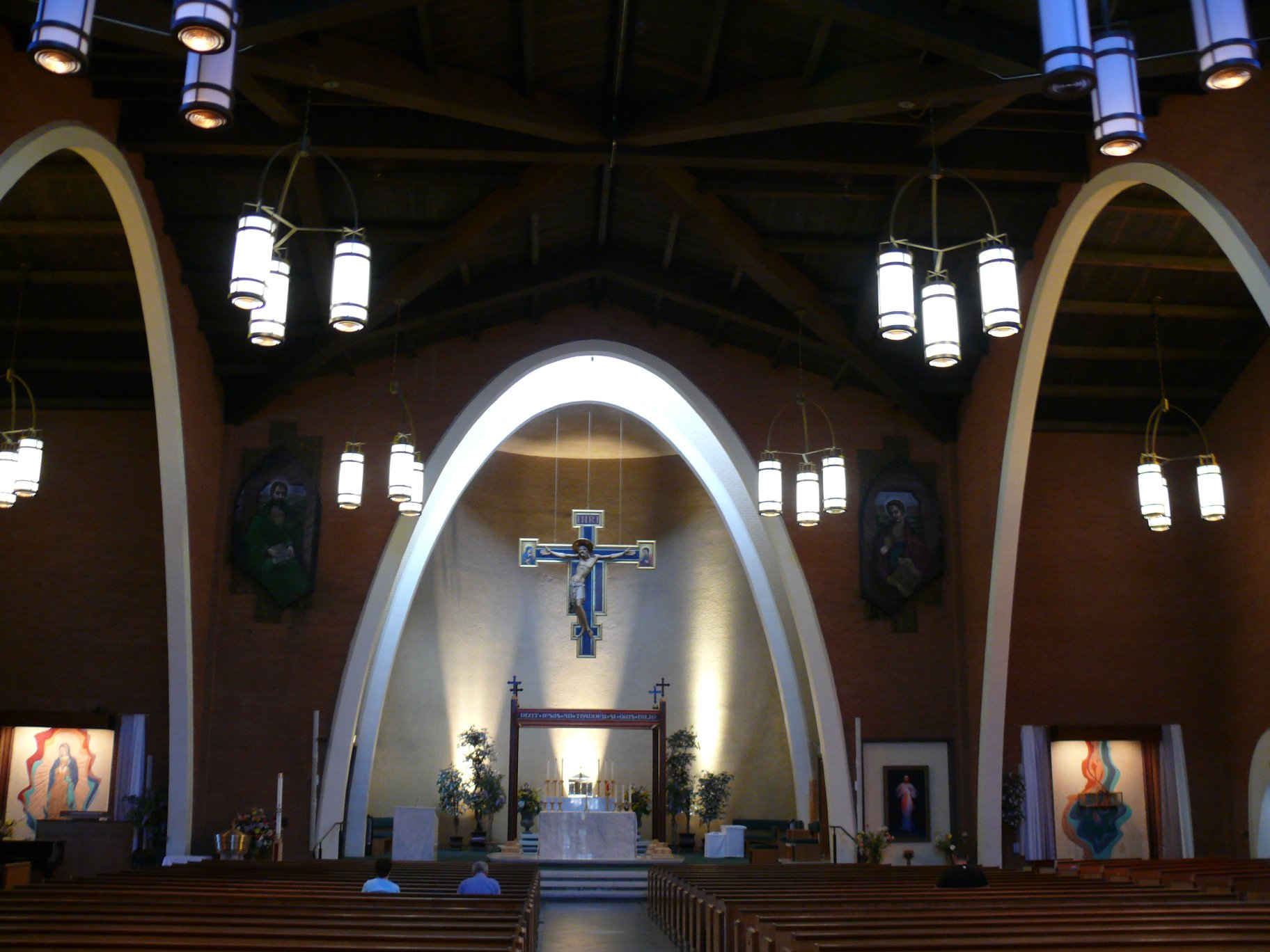
Chancel (2013)

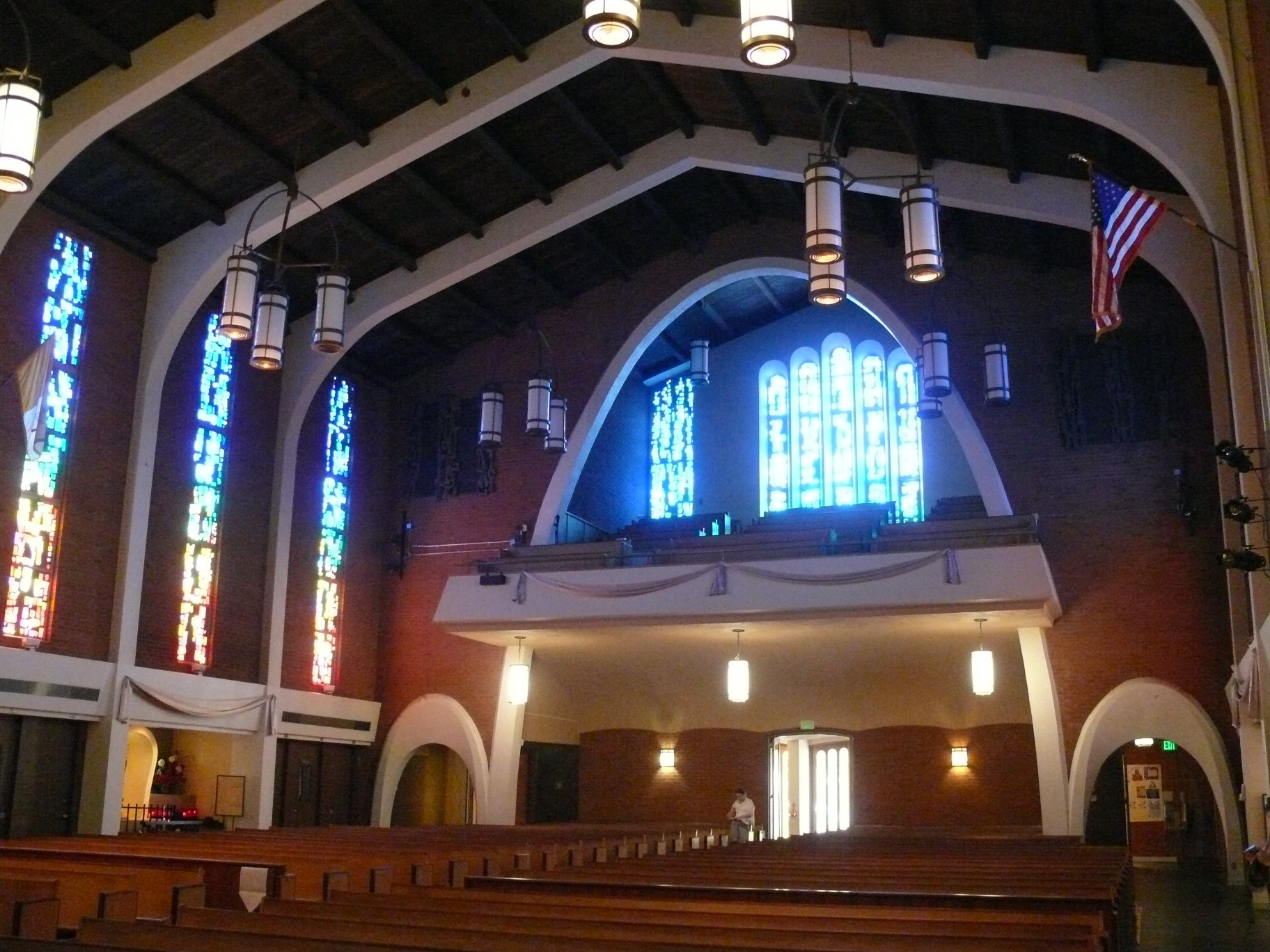
Rear gallery (2013)

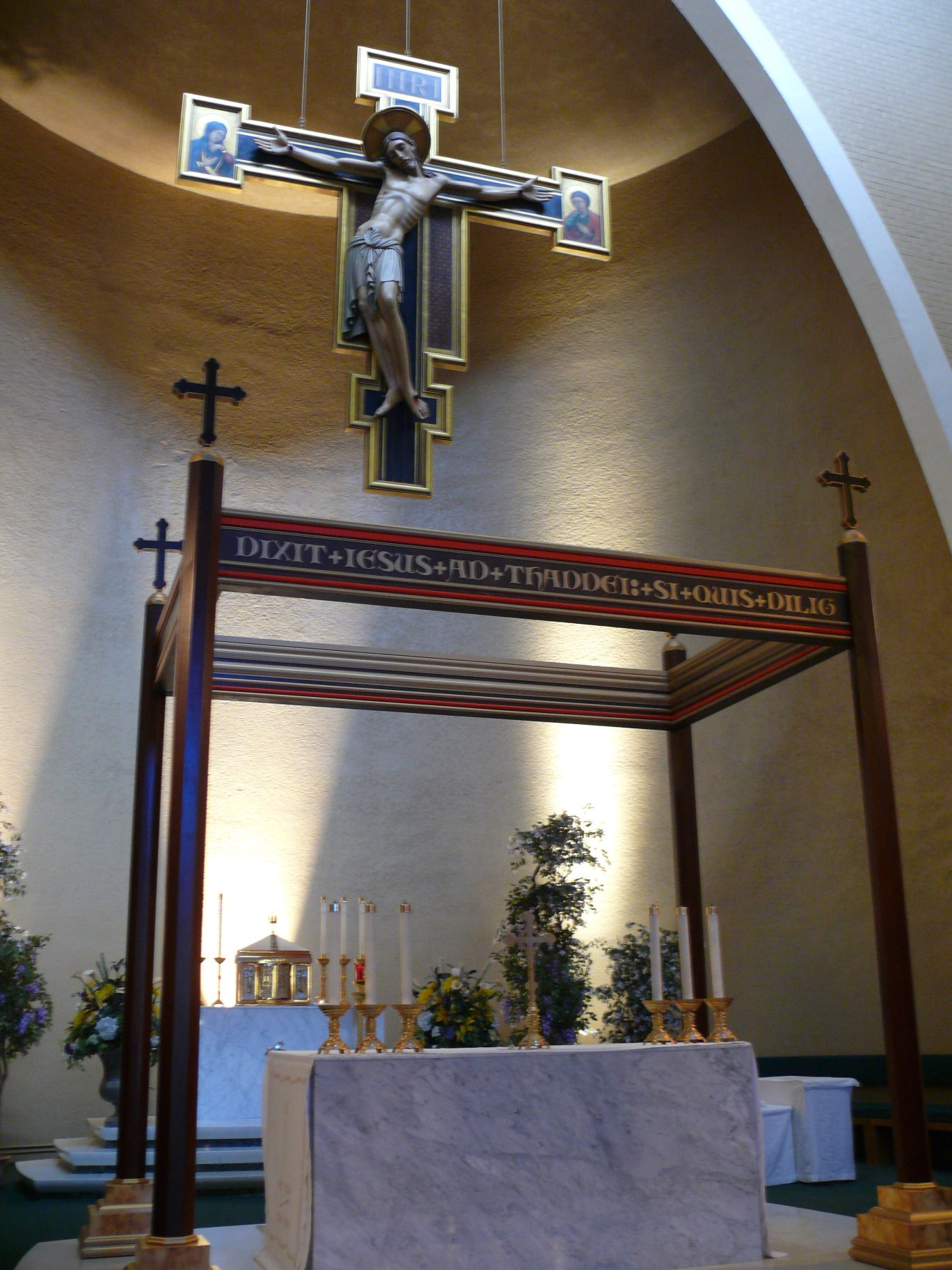
Altar (2013)

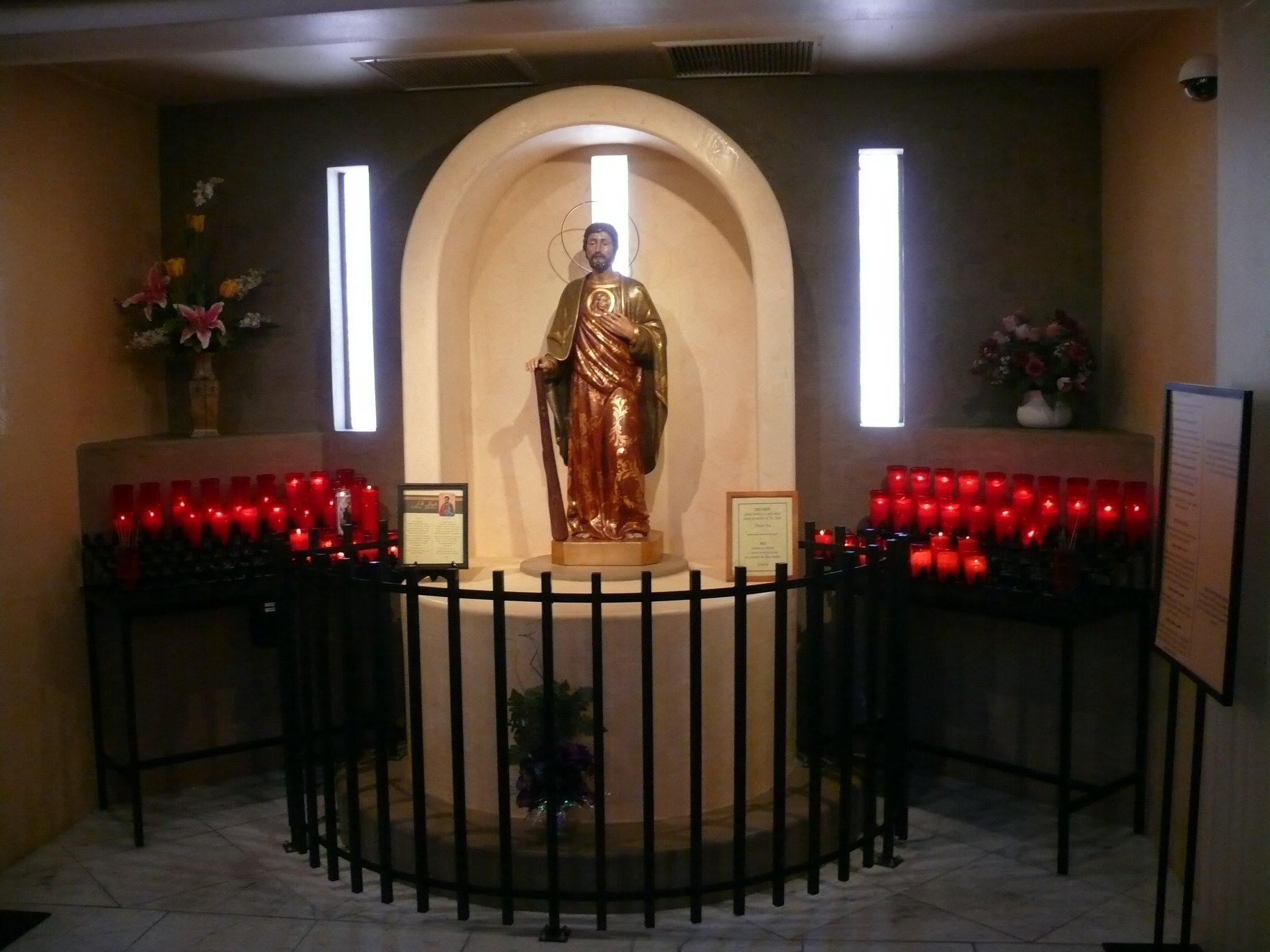
Chapel of Our Lady of Guadalupe (2013)

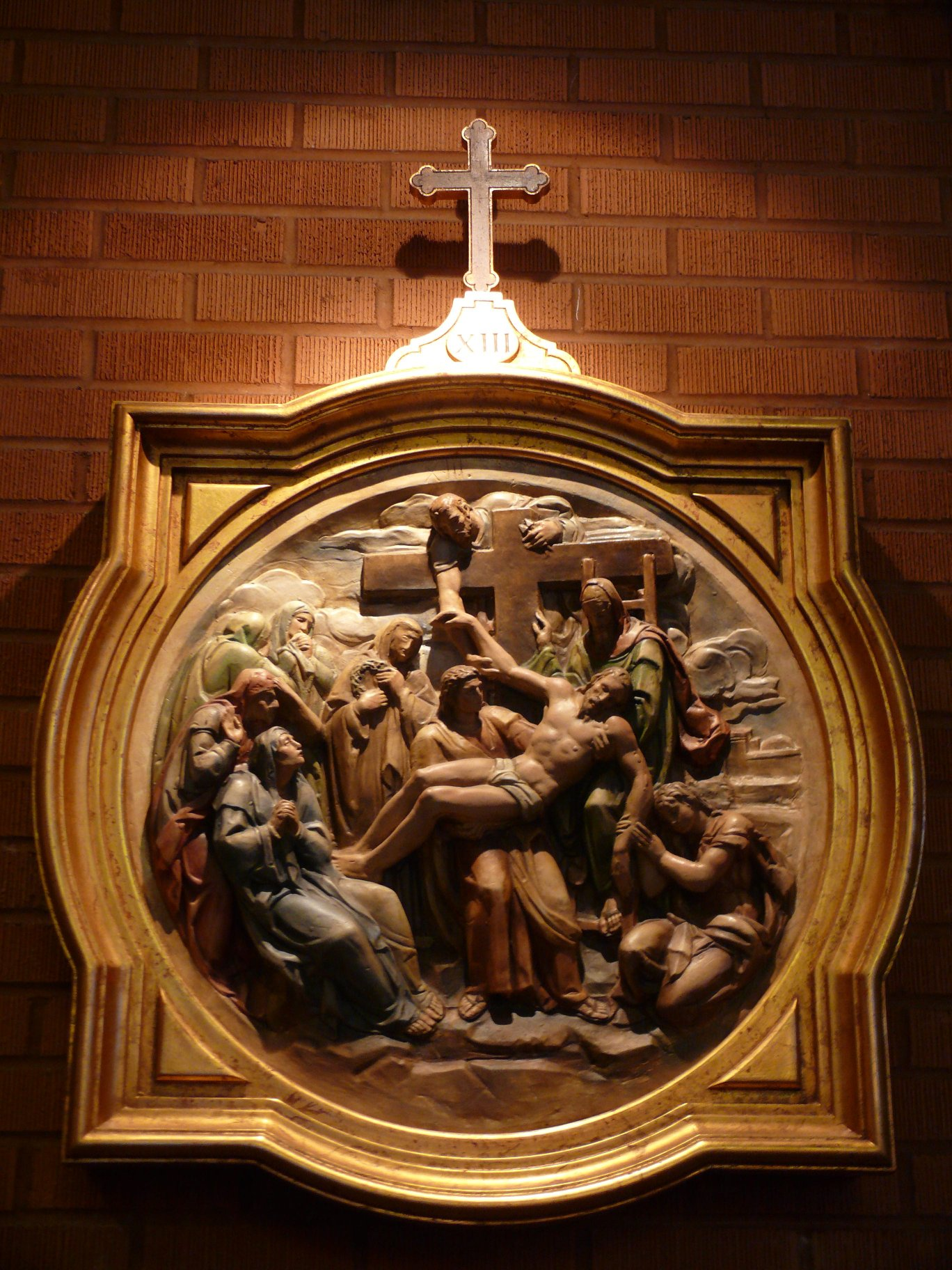
Crucifixion scene (2013)

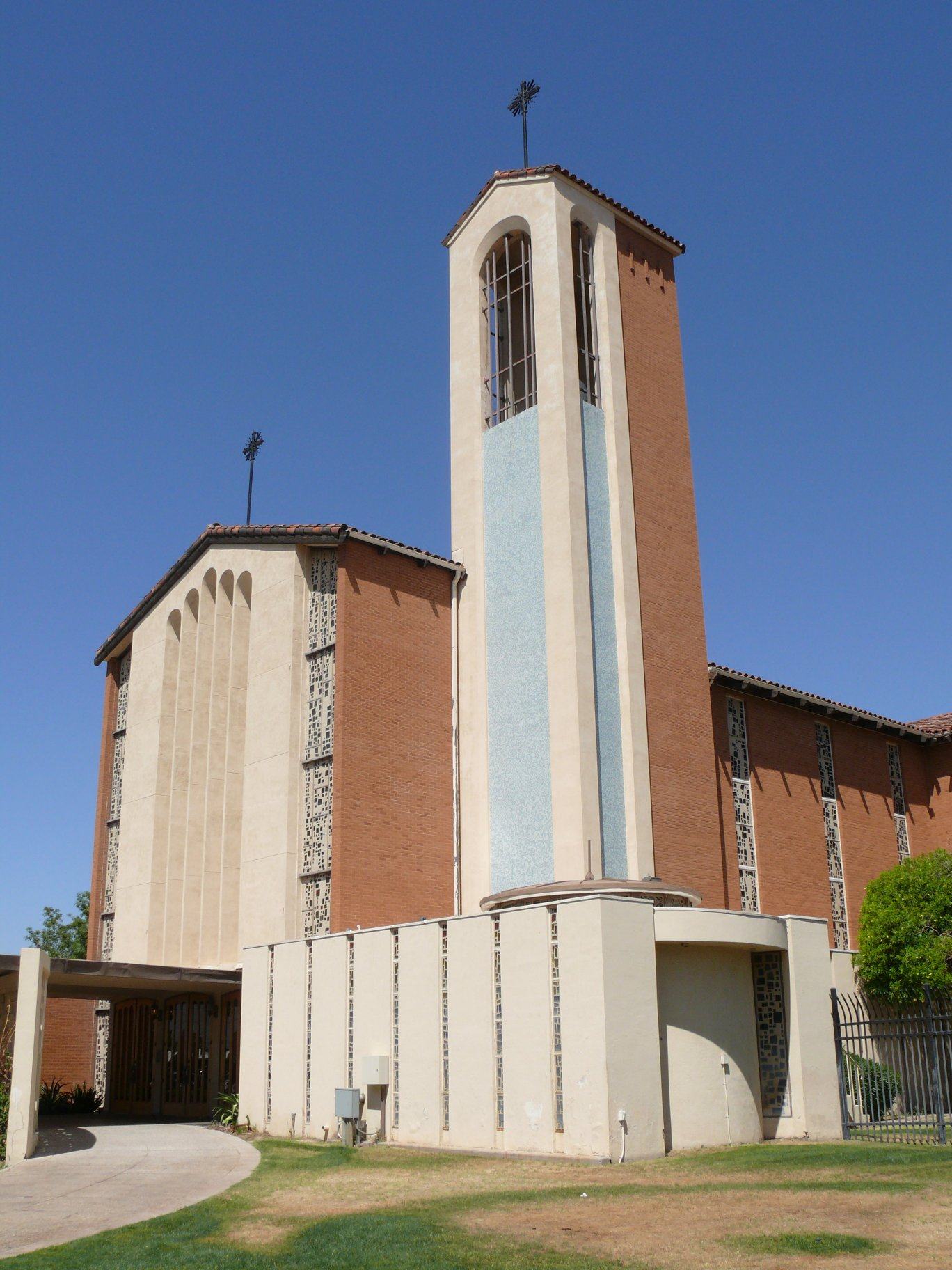
Bell tower (2013)

== See also ==
- List of Catholic cathedrals in the United States
- List of cathedrals in the United States
