= Our Lady of Guadalupe Church (Flagstaff, Arizona) =

NRHP-designated site in Coconino County, Arizona

- U.S. National Register of Historic Places
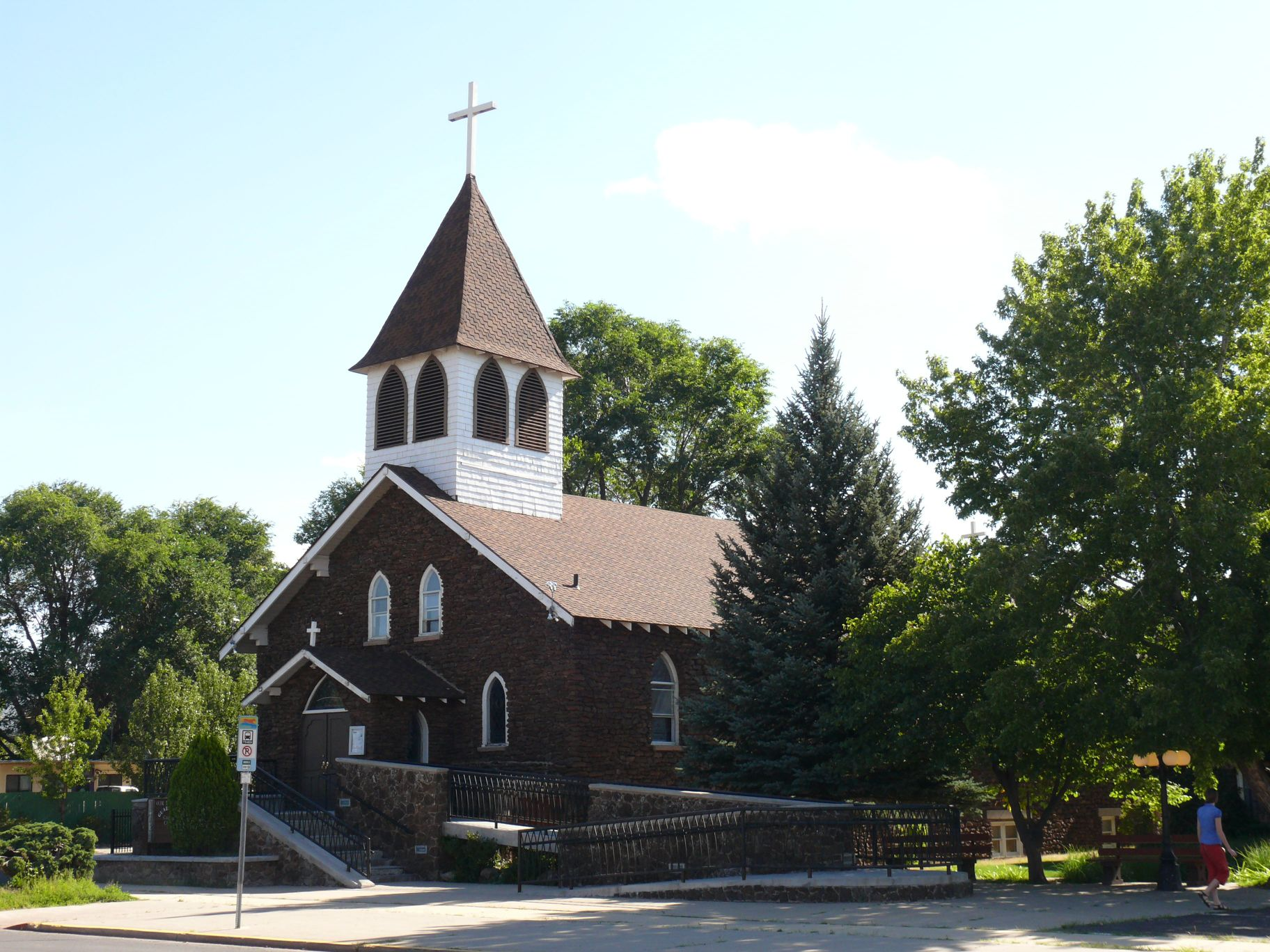

- Location within Arizona Location within the United States
- Location: 302 S. Kendrick, Flagstaff, Arizona
- Coordinates: 35°11′44″N 111°39′10″W
- Area: less than one acre
- Built: 1926
- Architect: Lindemann, Pete J.
- Architectural style: Bungalow/American Craftsman, Gothic
- MPS: Flagstaff MRA
- NRHP reference No.: 86000907
- Added to NRHP: April 30, 1986

Our Lady of Guadalupe Church is a historic church at 302 S. Kendrick in Flagstaff, Arizona, United States. It was built in 1926 and added to the National Register of Historic Places in 1986.
