= Eduardo Nevares =

American Catholic prelate (born 1954)

His Excellency, The Most Reverend Eduardo Alanis Nevares
- Auxiliary Bishop of Phoenix
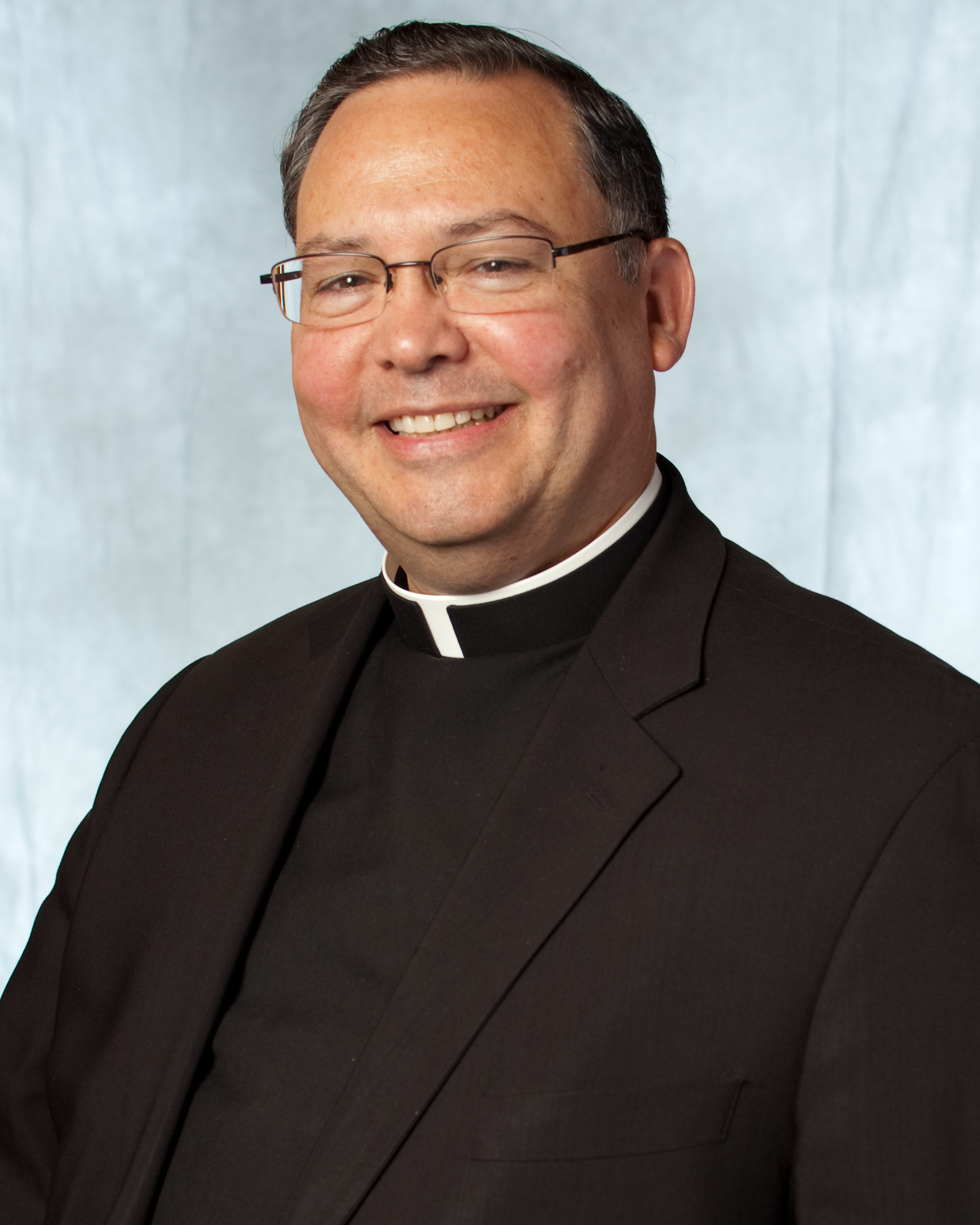
- Nevares in 2010
- Church: Church
- Diocese: Phoenix
- Appointed: May 11, 2010
- Installed: July 19, 2010
- Other post: Titular Bishop of Natchesium (2010‍–‍ )
- Previous posts: Vice-Rector of Pontifical College Josephinum; Co-Director of Vocations for Holy Orders and Consecrated Life for the La Salette Missionaries

Orders
- Ordination: July 18, 1981 by Bernard J. Ganter
- Consecration: July 19, 2010 by Thomas J. Olmsted, Michael Sheehan, and Álvaro Corrada del Río

Personal details
- Born: February 19, 1954 (age 72) San Antonio, Texas, US
- Education: La Salette Junior College Seminary; Missionary of Our Lady of La Salette Philosophy Seminary; University of St. Thomas (Texas); Kenrick-Glennon Seminary
- Motto: Serve the Lord with gladness

Styles of Eduardo Alanis Nevares
- Reference style: His Excellency; The Most Reverend
- Spoken style: Your Excellency
- Religious style: Bishop

Eduardo Alanis Nevares (born February 19, 1954) is an American prelate of the Catholic church. He has been serving as an auxiliary bishop of the Diocese of Phoenix in Arizona since 2010.

== Biography ==
=== Early life and education ===
Nevares was born on February 19, 1954, in San Antonio, Texas, to Andres Valdes Nevares and Beatriz Alanis Tamez. The youngest of six children in a Mexican-American family, he has one sister and four brothers, all of whom were born in Mexico. The family lived in Chicago, Illinois, before settling in Houston. Eduardo Nevares received his early education at the parochial school of Immaculate Heart of Mary Parish in Houston. At age 14, he enrolled at La Salette Minor Seminary in Jefferson City, Missouri. The following year, when the seminary closed, he transferred to St. Henry Preparatory Seminary in Belleville, Illinois.

Nevares continued his studies at La Salette Junior College Seminary in Altamont, New York, where he earned an Associate's degree in 1974. He attended the Missionary of Our Lady of La Salette Philosophy Seminary in Ipswich, Massachusetts, for one year before entering St. Thomas University in Houston. Nevares earned a Bachelor of Philosophy degree there in 1976. Nevares entered the novitiate of the Missionaries of Our Lady of La Salette in 1976, professing his first vows in 1977 and his final vows in 1980. Nevares completed his theological studies at Kenrick Seminary in St. Louis, Missouri, where he earned a Master of Divinity degree in 1981.

=== Ordination and ministry ===
Nevares was ordained to the priesthood at Saint Francis de Sales, Church in Houston for the La Salette Missionaries by Bishop Bernard J. Ganter on July 18, 1981. His first assignment was as a parochial vicar at St. Patrick's Parish in Lufkin, Texas, where he remained for seven years. From 1988 to 1991, Nevares served as vocations director for the La Salette Missionaries. He then resumed his pastoral ministry, serving as a parochial vicar at Our Lady of Sorrows Parish in Jacksonville, Texas (1991) and as a chaplain at Stephen F. Austin State University in Nacogdoches, Texas (1991–93).

From 1993 to 2002, Nevares served as pastor of St. Patrick's Church in Lufkin. During his tenure at St. Patrick's, he oversaw the construction of a new church, which was completed and consecrated in 2001. In addition to his pastoral duties, Nevares served as provincial counselor to the St. Louis province of the La Salette Missionaries (1994–97). Nevares became co-director of vocations for holy orders and consecrated life in the Diocese of Tyler in 2002. In this capacity, he organized and conducted the first Spanish-speaking program for candidates for the permanent diaconate. He also served as diocesan director of charismatic groups.

After 25 years as a La Salette Missionary, Nevares was incardinated into the Diocese of Tyler in 2007. In 2008, he was appointed vice-rector of the College of Liberal Arts at the Pontifical College Josephinum in Columbus, Ohio. As vice-rector, he has assisted with the administration of the priestly formation program, coordinated the formation for college level seminarians, and taught Spanish to the college seminarians.

=== Auxiliary Bishop of Phoenix ===
On May 11, 2010, Nevares was appointed as an auxiliary bishop of the Diocese of Phoenix and titular bishop of Natchesium by Pope Benedict XVI. Nevares is the first auxiliary bishop of and the first Hispanic bishop of the diocese. His episcopal motto is: "Serve the Lord with gladness." Nevares received his episcopal consecration on July 19, 2010, from Bishop Thomas J. Olmsted at Saint Thomas Aquinas Catholic Church in Avondale, Arizona.

== See also ==
- Catholic Church in the United States
- Hierarchy of the Catholic Church
- Historical list of the Catholic bishops of the United States
- List of Catholic bishops in the United States
- Lists of popes, patriarchs, primates, archbishops, and bishops

Catholic Church titles
Preceded by -	Auxiliary Bishop of Phoenix; 2010 – present	Succeeded by -
