= Diocese of Phoenix =

Latin Catholic jurisdiction in Arizona, United States

Diocese of Phoenix Dioecesis Phoenicensis Diócesis de Phoenix

Catholic
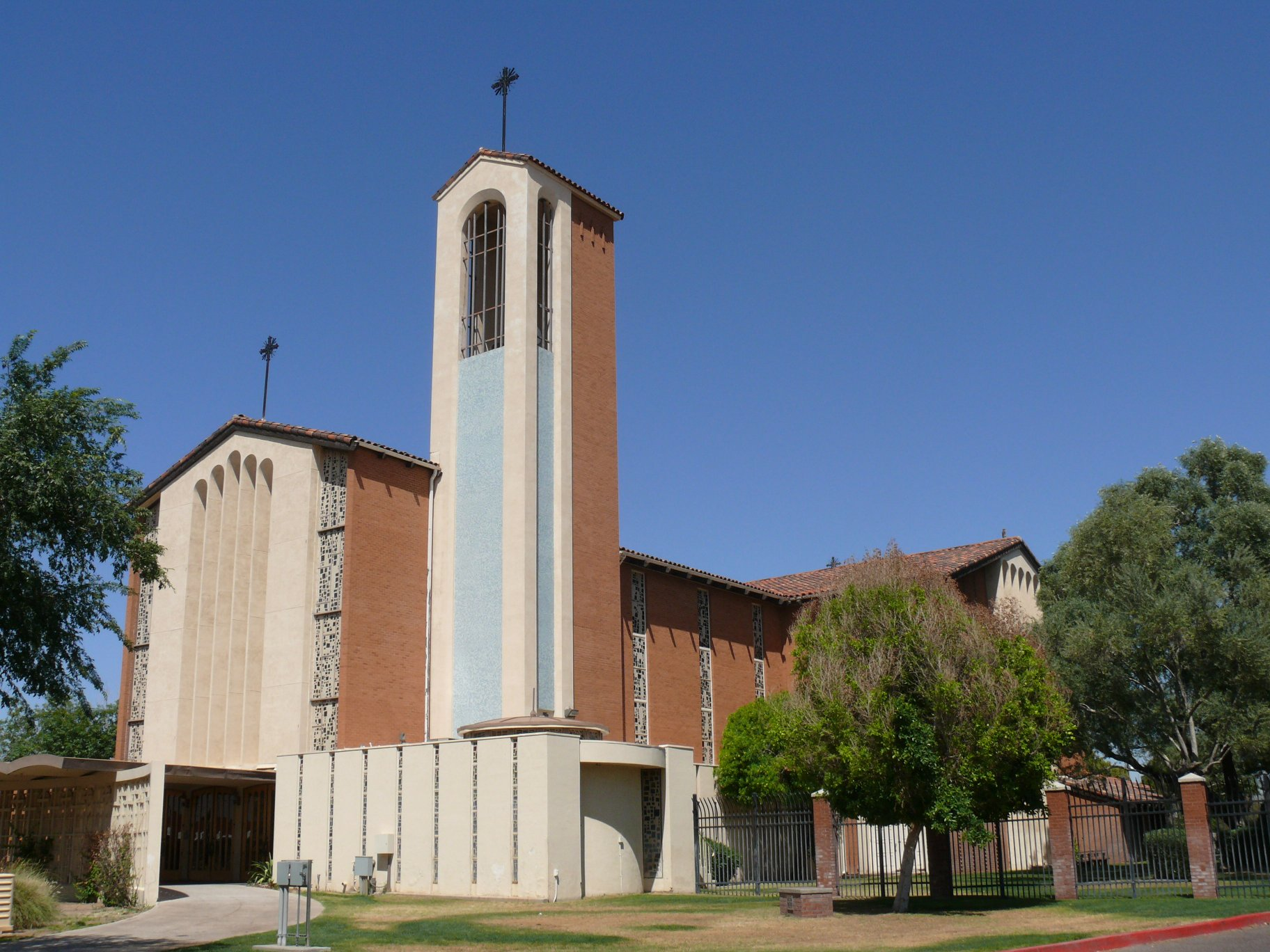
- Cathedral of Saints Simon and Jude

- Coat of arms

Location
- Country: United States
- Territory: Arizona counties of Maricopa, Mohave, Yavapai, and Coconino (excluding the territorial boundaries of the Navajo Nation), and also includes the Gila River Indian Reservation in Pinal County
- Episcopal conference: United States Conference of Catholic Bishops
- Ecclesiastical region: Region XIII
- Ecclesiastical province: Santa Fe
- Deaneries: 15
- Coordinates: 33°27′0″N 112°4′0″W

Statistics
- Area: 43,967 sq mi (113,870 km^{2})
- Population: Total; Catholics: (as of 2024); 5,076,170; 2,274,140 (44.8%)
- Parishes: 94 & 23 missions
- Schools: 67

Information
- Denomination: Catholic Church
- Sui iuris church: Latin Church
- Rite: Roman Rite
- Established: December 2, 1969; 56 years ago
- Cathedral: Cathedral of Saints Simon and Jude
- Patroness: Our Lady of Guadalupe
- Secular priests: 216

Current leadership
- Pope: Leo XIV
- Bishop: John P. Dolan
- Metropolitan Archbishop: John Charles Wester
- Auxiliary Bishops: Eduardo Nevares; Peter Dai Bui
- Vicar General: John Muir
- Bishops emeritus: Thomas Olmsted

Map
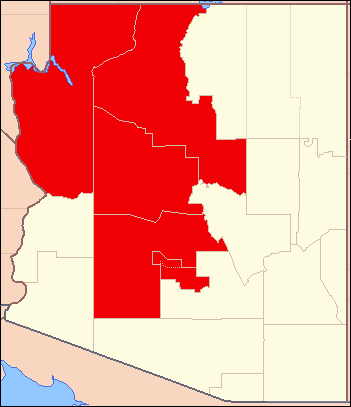
- Diocese of Phoenix, Arizona

Website
- dphx.org

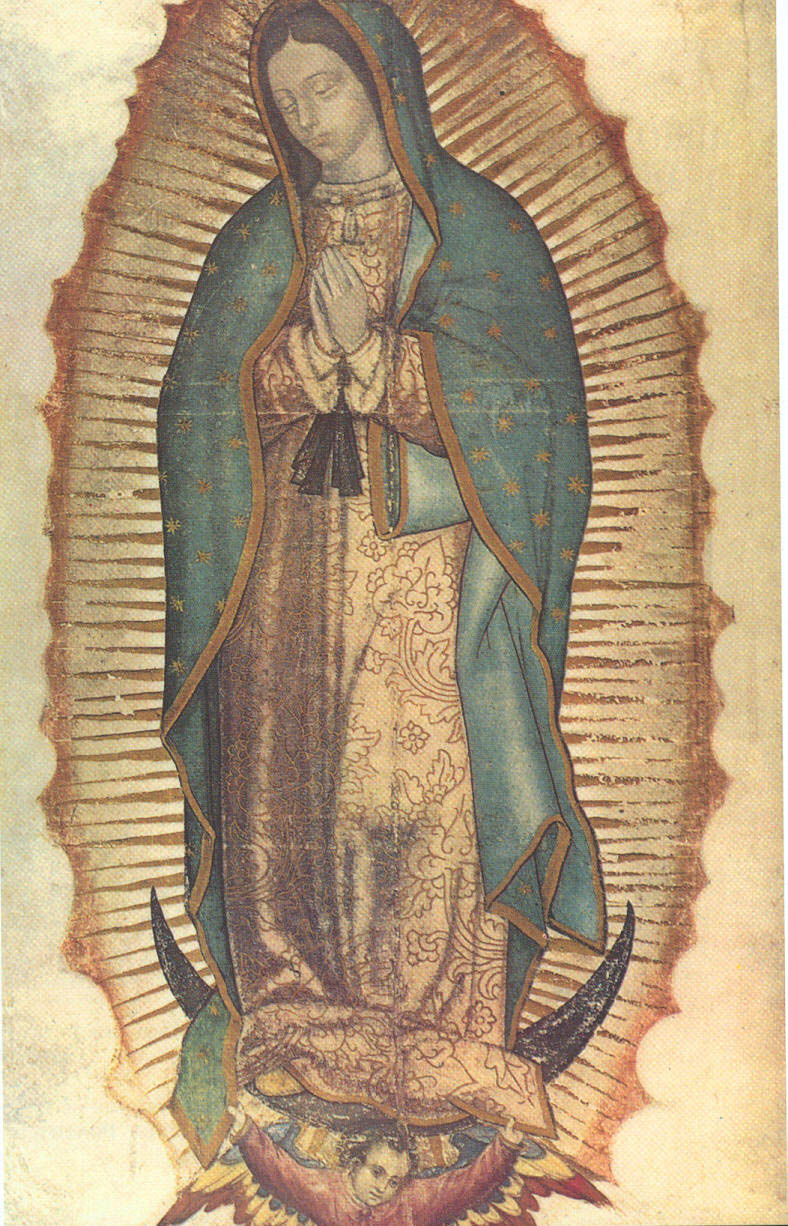
Our Lady of Guadalupe, patron saint of the diocese (2006)

The Diocese of Phoenix (Latin: Dioecesis Phoenicensis; Spanish: Diócesis de Phoenix) is a diocese in western and central Arizona in the United States. Established in 1969, it is a suffragan diocese of the Archdiocese of Santa Fe.

The Diocese of Phoenix is the second largest Catholic diocese in the United States. The bishop is John P. Dolan.

== Territory ==
The Diocese of Phoenix includes Maricopa, Mohave, Yavapai, and Coconino counties and the Gila River Indian Reservation in Pinal County. It excludes the Navajo Nation territory.

== History ==
=== 1539 to 1800 ===
The first Catholic in modern-day Arizona was Marcos de Niza, a French Franciscan friar. He traveled up from the Gulf of California into Southern Arizona in 1539.

Spanish Jesuit priests arrived in present-day northern Mexico in the 1610s in the lowlands near the Pacific Ocean. They worked out a compromise with the people of the Yaqui River valley that allowed for the establishment of over fifty mission settlements. However, this arrangement broke down when the Jesuits attempted to end the Yaqui shamanic religious tradition.

The Opata people allowed the Jesuits to set up missions in the Pima and Tohono O'odham territories in present-day Arizona. An agreement between General Pedro de Perea and the viceroy of New Spain resulted in the formation of the Province of Nueva Navarra in 1637. It was renamed the Province of Sonora in 1648.

The most famous Jesuit missionary in the region was Eusebio Kino. He arrived in Nueva Navarra in 1687 and started missionary work in the Pimería Alta area. He began his first mission at Cucurpe in the present-day Mexican State of Sonora, then established churches and missions in Los Remedios, Imuris, Magdalena, Cocóspera, San Ignacio, Tubutama and Caborca. To develop an economy for the natives, Kino taught them European farming techniques. He established the Mission San Xavier del Bac in the Tohono O’odham Nation in present-day Tucson in 1692.

=== 1800 to 1900 ===
With the end of the Mexican War of Independence in 1821, Spain ceded its colonies in the Southwest to Mexico. The Franciscans and other religious orders in the following years. abandoned their missions in Nueva Navarra and other areas of New Spain. When Mexico ceded the Southwest to the United States after the Mexican-American War in 1848, the Catholics in the region came under the following ecclesiastical jurisdictions:

- Vicariate Apostolic of New Mexico (1850 to 1853)
- Diocese of New Mexico (1853 to 1868)
- Vicariate Apostolic of Arizona (1868 to 1897)
- Diocese of Tucson (1897 to 1969)
- Diocese of Phoenix (1969 to present)

The first Catholic church in Phoenix, the Church of the Immaculate Conception of the Blessed Virgin Mary, was dedicated in 1881. It would remain the only parish in the city until 1924. Also in 1881, the first Catholic church was constructed in Tempe; it would be replaced in 1903 by Old St. Mary's Church. The first Catholic church in Flagstaff, First Nativity, was dedicated in 1888.

In 1892, a contingent of the Sisters of Mercy arrived in Phoenix to open a school. Realizing that the community had many people suffering from tuberculosis, they also opened a sanitarium.Sacred Heart Church in Prescott was finished in 1894. The Sisters of Mercy in 1895 converted their sanitarium into St. Joseph Hospital. Today it is St. Joseph's Hospital and Medical Center.

=== 1900 to 2000 ===
Our Lady of Perpetual Help, known as the Old Adobe Mission, was constructed by Mexican Catholics in the 1910s; it is the oldest Catholic church in Scottsdale.

Pope Paul VI erected the Diocese of Phoenix in 1969, taking its territory from the Dioceses of Tucson and Gallup. The pope appointed Auxiliary Bishop Edward A. McCarthy from the Archdiocese of Cincinnati as the first bishop of Phoenix. In 1976, McCarthy was named coadjutor archbishop of the Archdiocese of Miami.

The second bishop of Phoenix was Auxiliary Bishop James Rausch from the Diocese of St. Cloud, named by Paul VI in 1977. On occasion, he would celebrate mass in orange groves to accommodate undocumented migrants who were afraid to travel to a church in a city. Rausch died in 1981.

To replace Rausch, Pope John Paul II appointed Thomas J. O'Brien from Tucson in 1981. During his tenure, O'Brien earned a reputation as a successful fundraiser, builder of schools, and advocate for the poor. He was also instrumental in persuading John Paul II and Mother Teresa to visit Phoenix in the late 1980s. In 2003, a week after O'Brien fatally struck a pedestrian in a hit and run incident, he resigned as bishop of Phoenix. His successor was Thomas Olmsted, previously bishop of the Diocese of Lincoln.

=== 2000 to present ===
In 2009 the diocese contributed $50,000 to the successful campaign by Stand For Marriage Maine to overturn an impending legalization of same-sex marriage in Maine. Olmsted in 2010 stated that St. Joseph's Hospital and Medical Center could no longer call itself a Catholic institution. This was because the hospital terminated the pregnancy of a patient because her life was in danger.

In 2014, two priests were shot during a burglary at Mater Misericordiae Mission in Phoenix: Kenneth Walker was killed and Joseph Terra was wounded.The diocese in 2019 opened Nazareth House, a two-year, college level seminary in Phoenix.

In July 2021, in response to Pope Francis' motu proprio, Traditionis Custodes, which restricts the celebration of the Traditional Latin Mass (TLM), Olmsted issued a decree allowing the TLM to continue in the diocese under his dispensation. Early in 2022, Andres Arango, pastor at St. Gregory Parish in Phoenix, resigned after learning that he had used the incorrect words when performing thousands of baptisms. Olmsted said he believed the inadvertent error required the individuals to be baptized again. Olmsted retired as bishop of Phoenix in 2022.

Auxiliary Bishop John P. Dolan of the Diocese of San Diego was appointed by Francis as the next bishop of Phoenix in 2022.In 2024, the Diocese of Phoenix became the second largest diocese by Catholic population in the United States, surpassed only by the Archdiocese of Los Angeles.

In April 2025, the University of Mary in Bismarck, North Dakota, and the Diocese of Phoenix announced plans to establish Nazareth Seminary, the first full seminary in Arizona. As of 2026, Dolan is the bishop of the diocese.

== Media ==
=== Radio ministry ===
Radio Family Rosary is a radio ministry of the Diocese of Phoenix founded in 1983, which is carried every weekday by Salem's KXXT (1010 AM) at 8:30 a.m. and 6:30 p.m. Mountain Time.

=== Newspaper ===
The Catholic Sun is the official newspaper of the Diocese of Phoenix. It was founded in 1985 and at its peak had a circulation of 125,000. Due to the COVID-19 pandemic in the United States, the paper ceased its print edition in April 2020 and continued online-only. In October 2021, Together magazine was launched as a replacement, printed six times a year and sent sent to 40,000 households. In January 2025, the magazine was renamed to The Catholic Sun magazine.

== Bishops ==
=== Bishops of Phoenix ===
1. Edward Anthony McCarthy (1969–1976), appointed Coadjutor Archbishop and later Archbishop of Miami
2. James Steven Rausch (1977–1981)
3. Thomas O'Brien (1982–2003)
4. Thomas Olmsted (2003–2022)
5. John P. Dolan (2022–present)

=== Auxiliary Bishops ===
1. Eduardo Nevares (2010–present)
2. Peter Dai Bui (2026–present)

=== Diocesan priests who became a bishop ===
James Sean Wall, appointed Bishop of Gallup in 2009:

== Parishes and missions ==
As of 2025, the Diocese of Phoenix has 94 parishes and 23 missions.

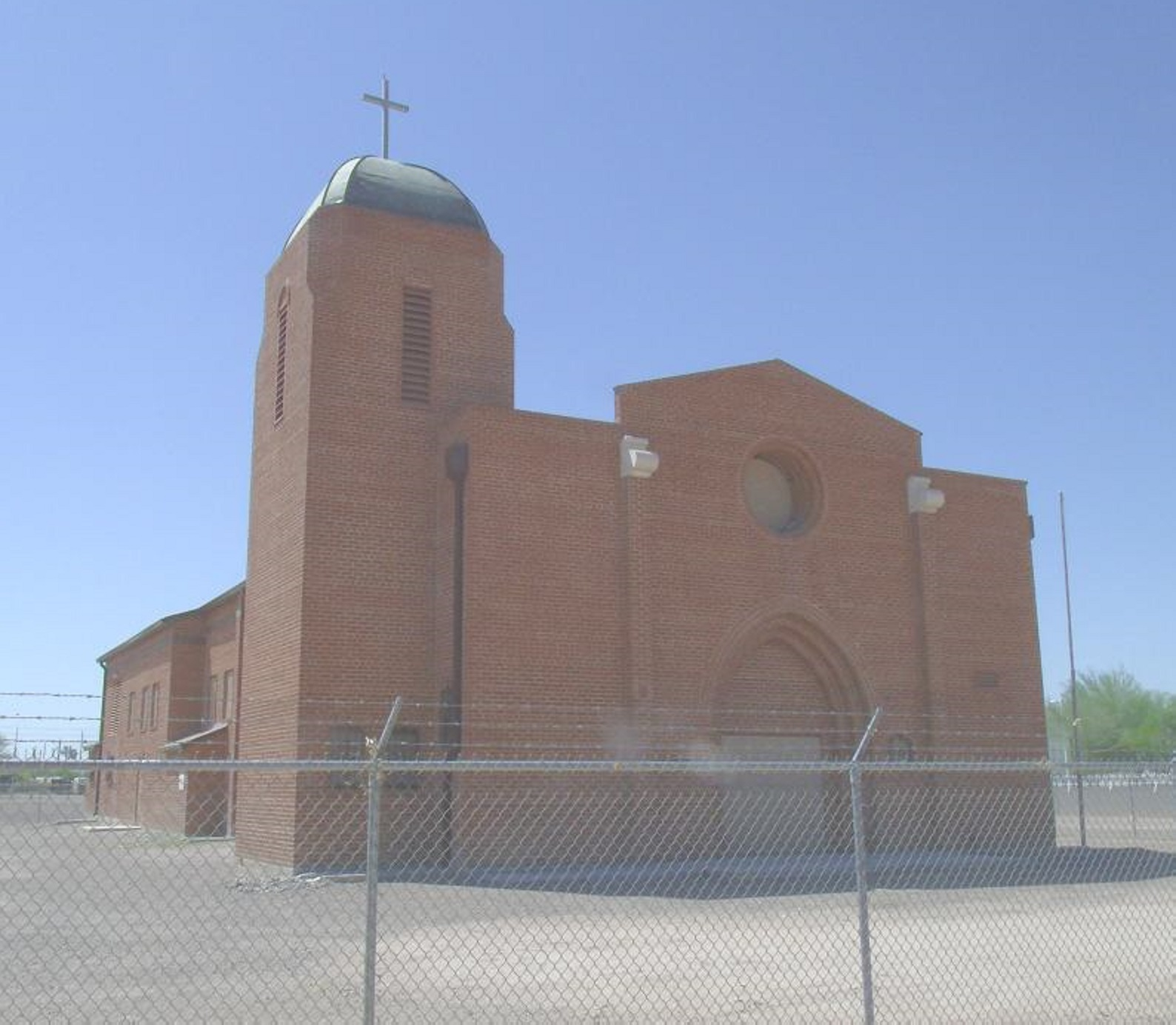
Sacred Heart Church, Phoenix, Arizona (2013)

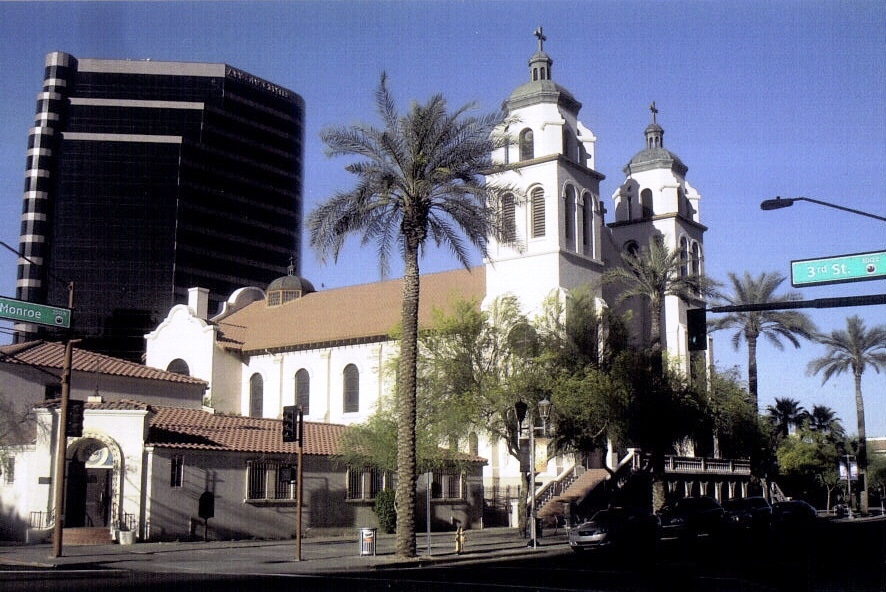
Saint Mary's Basilica, Phoenix, Arizona (2013)

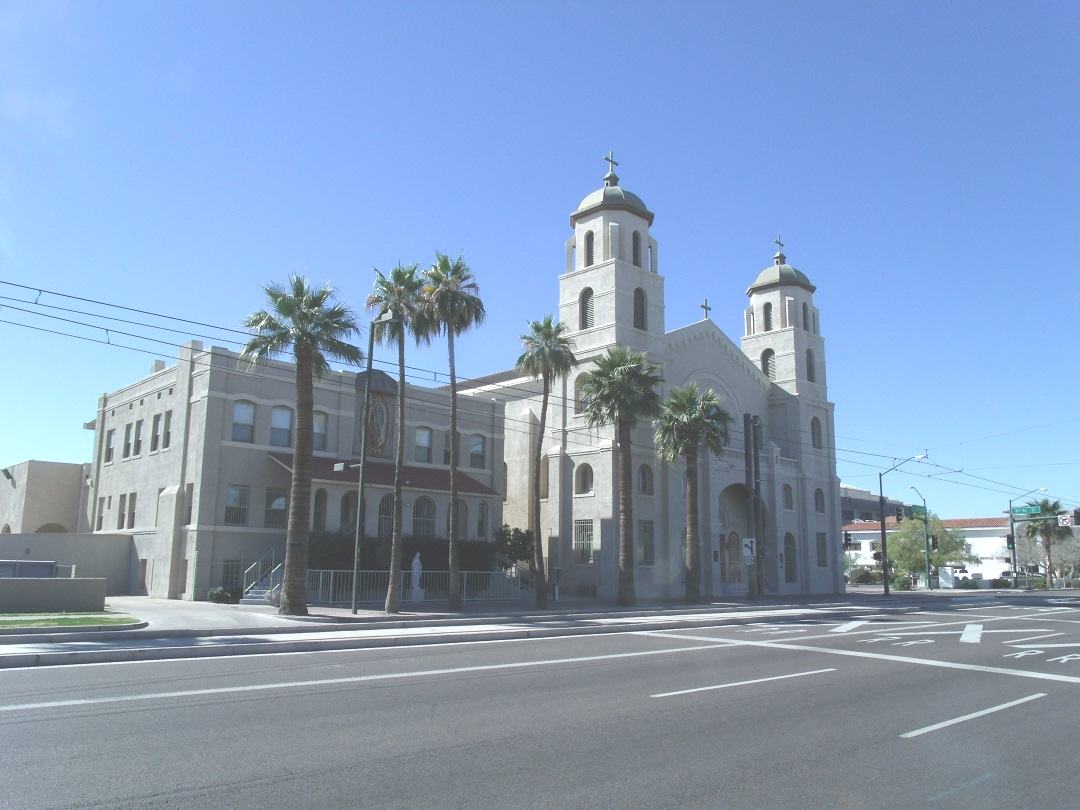
Immaculate Heart of Mary Catholic Church, Phoenix, Arizona (2014), oldest Hispanic church in the city.

== Schools ==
As of 2026, the Diocese of Phoenix has seven Catholic high schools, 29 elementary schools, and 29 pre-schools. Benedictine University Mesa and Mary College at ASU offer degree programs within the diocese. The diocese also operates campus ministry programs at the Newman Centers for four public universities.

=== High schools ===
- Bourgade Catholic High School – Phoenix
- Brophy College Preparatory – Phoenix (independent Jesuit school)
- Notre Dame Preparatory High School- Scottsdale
- St. John Paul II Catholic High School – Avondale
- St. Mary's High School – Phoenix
- Seton Catholic Preparatory – Chandler
- Xavier College Preparatory – Phoenix

== Religious congregations ==
As of 2026 22 communities of religious men and 30 communities of religious women have a presence in the Diocese of Phoenix.A diocesan Office of Religious Life serves as a guide for members of religious communities and for persons interested in consecrated life in its various forms.
