= Columbus's vow =

Promise by Christopher Columbus in his first voyage to the Americas

Columbus's vow (Spanish: El Voto colombino) was a vow by Christopher Columbus and other members of the crew of the caravel Niña on 14 February 1493, during the return trip of Columbus's first voyage to perform certain acts, including pilgrimages, upon their return to Spain. The vow was taken at Columbus's behest during a severe storm at sea.

== History ==
Of the three ships on Columbus's first voyage, the flagship, the Santa María, had been shipwrecked in Hispaniola on December 25, 1492, leaving only the Niña and Pinta to make the homeward voyage. 39 men were left behind, the first Spanish colonists in the Americas. Columbus took command of the Niña; Martín Alonso Pinzón retained command of the Pinta.

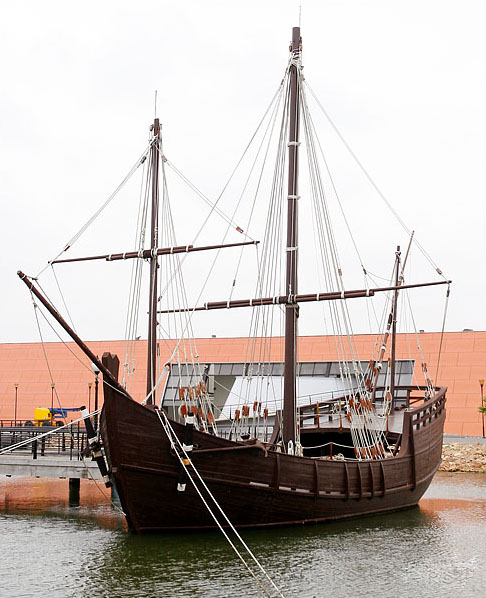
A replica in Palos de la Frontera, Spain shows how the Niña may have appeared.

On 14 February 1493, in the Atlantic Ocean east of the Azores, they met with a storm that threatened to capsize the two caravels. In the storm, the boats lost contact with one another, and the crew of the Niña feared the worst. At that moment the admiral, Columbus, proposed a series of vows.

The Admiral ordered that lots should be cast for one of them to go on a pilgrimage to St. Mary of Guadalupe and carry a wax taper of five pounds weight; he caused them all to take an oath that the one on whom the lot fell, should perform the pilgrimage. For this purpose as many peas were selected as there were persons on board, one of them was marked with a cross, and the whole shaken together in a cap. The first who put his hand in, was the Admiral, and he drew the crossed pea. So the lot fell upon him, and he looked upon himself as bound to accomplish the pilgrimage. Another lot was taken for a pilgrimage to St. Mary of Loretto, in the marc of Ancona, territory of the pope, which is the house where Our Lady has performed so many miracles, this fell upon a sailor of Puerto de Santa Maria, called Pedro de Villa; the Admiral promised to furnish him with money for his expenses. A third lot was determined upon, for the selection of a person who should watch a whole night in St. Clara de Moguer, and have a mass said there; it fell again upon the Admiral. After this, he and all the crew made a vow to go in procession, clothed in penitential garments, to the first church dedicated to Our Lady which they should meet with on arriving at land, and there pay their devotions. Besides these general vows, every individual made his private one, all expecting to be lost, so furious was the rage of the hurricane.

— Christopher Columbus and Bartolomé de las Casas

== Fulfillment of the vows ==
On March 15, 1493, after having touched down at the Azores and at Lisbon, the Niña arrived on the banks of the Río Tinto in the Spanish province of Huelva. Columbus, the Niño brothers and the rest of the crew from Moguer headed immediately to Moguer, bringing with them some Caribbean natives whom they had taken on their voyage back, and also bringing several parrots. The people of Moguer greeted them happily; Columbus and his crew headed promptly to the Santa Clara Monastery to light a taper and spend the night in vigil, in fulfilment of one of their vows.

Years later, at Columbus's trial in 1513, Juan Rodríguez Cabezudo, a resident of Moguer and a friend of Columbus, who had taken custody of Columbus's son Diego while Columbus was away at sea, described the event:

"...They entered from the caravel whence the said admiral came, and the said admiral showed them golden masks that he brought from the Indies and six or seven Indians that he brought from there, and with a knife the said admiral removed a little gold and gave it to an Indian."

The same archive contains the remarks of another witness, Martín González:

"...he came the year of 'ninety-three and returned to the port of this town and thus the said admiral, like all who came with him, said publicly that they had discovered and found the said Indies and many islands..."

— "...vino el año de noventa e tres e tornó al puerto dsta villa e así el dicho almirante como todos los que venían con él dezían públicamente que avían descubierto e hallado las dichas yndias e otras muchas yslas..."

== Commemoration ==
This act is remembered annually on March 16 in an event at the Santa Clara Monastery in Moguer, attended by civil and military authorities, the Royal Columbian Society of Huelva (Real Sociedad Colombina Onubense), and the general public.

The event consists of a mass in which a taper is burned as an act of thanksgiving, and later crown of laurel is placed on the Columbus Monument in homage to the Admiral and the sailors of Moguer who took part in the discovery of America. This is then followed by a talk or a cultural event.

== See also ==
- Lugares colombinos
