= Comarca Metropolitana de Huelva =

Comarca in Huelva, Andalusia, Spain

- Comarca
- Comarca Metropolitana de Huelva
- Country: Spain
- Autonomous community: Andalusia
- Province: Huelva

Area
  - Total: 850.04 km^{2} (328.20 sq mi)

Population (2024) (Note: Estimate at 1 January 2024: National Statistics Institute (Spain))
  - Total: 241,085
  - Density: 283.62/km^{2} (734.56/sq mi)
- Time zone: UTC+1 (CET)
  - Summer (DST): UTC+2 (CEST)

Comarca metropolitana de Huelva is one of the six comarcas of the province of Huelva, in Andalusia, Spain. It is located in the southern part of the province, sharing borders with other comarcas: El Andévalo to the north, Costa Occidental de Huelva to the west, El Condado de Huelva to the east; as well as the Atlantic Ocean to the south.

== Municipalities ==
Arms	Municipality	Area (km²)	Population (2024) (Note: Estimate at 1 January 2024: National Statistics Institute (Spain))	Density (/km^{2})
	Aljaraque	33.82	22,489	664.96
	Gibraleon	328.33	13,144	40.03
	Huelva	151.33	143,290	946.87
	Moguer	203.50	23,551	115.73
	Palos de la Frontera	49.3	12,663	256.86
	Punta Umbria	38.37	16,137	420.56
	San Juan del Puerto	45.39	9,811	216.15
Comarca Metropolitana de Huelva		850.04	241,085	283.61
