= 1493 in Spain =

- Decades: 1480s; 1490s; 1500s; 1510s
- See also: History of Spain; Timeline of Spanish history; List of years in Spain

Events in the year 1493 in Spain.

== Events ==
- 16 January – Christopher Columbus leaves the New World and sets sail for Spain.
- 19 January – Treaty of Barcelona: Charles VIII of France returns Cerdagne and Roussillon to Ferdinand of Aragon.
- 1 March – Martín Alonso Pinzón returns to the city of Bayona in Spain from the voyage of discovery, sending the first notice about the discovery to the Catholic Monarchs (Christopher Columbus is delayed by a storm in the Azores).
- 15 March – Christopher Columbus and Martín Alonso Pinzón return to Palos de la Frontera, the original port in Spain from where they started the first voyage of discovery.
- 4 May – In the papal bull Inter caetera, Pope Alexander VI decrees that all lands discovered 100 leagues (or further west) of the Azores are Spanish.
- 24 September – Christopher Columbus leaves Cádiz on his second voyage of exploration.

== Births ==
- 9 December – Íñigo López de Mendoza, 4th Duke of the Infantado, nobleman

== Deaths ==
- Martín Alonso Pinzón, Spanish navigator and explorer (b. c. 1441)
