= Fontanilla (disambiguation) =

The Fontanilla is a former public fountain in Spain.

Fontanilla may also refer to:

- Kiara Fontanilla (born 2000), Filipino-American footballer
- Fontanilla, a family of characters in the 2015 Philippine TV series You're My Home

== See also ==
- Antònia Fontanillas
