= Moguer =

- Municipality and city
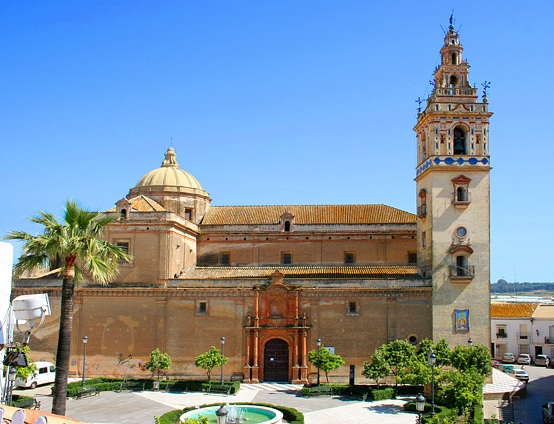
- Iglesia de Nuestra Señora de Granada

- Flag Coat of arms

- Location in Andalusia
- Coordinates: 37°16′31.63″N 6°50′18.55″W
- Country: Spain
- Autonomous community: Andalusia
- Province: Huelva
- Comarca: Metropolitan District of Huelva

Government
  - Mayor: Gustavo Cuéllar Cruz (PSOE–A)

Area
  - Total: 204 km^{2} (79 sq mi)
- Elevation: 51 m (167 ft)
- Demonym: Moguereños
- Time zone: UTC+1 (CET)
  - Summer (DST): UTC+2 (CEST)
- Postal code: 21800 - 21130 (Mazagón)
- Official language(s): Spanish
- Website: www.aytomoguer.es

Moguer is a municipality and small city located in the province of Huelva, Andalusia, Spain. According to the 2023 census, it has a population of 22,956. Its surface area is 204 square kilometres (79 sq mi), and its population density is 11,281 per square kilometre (29,220/sq mi).

The present site of Moguer had been home to many human settlements since antiquity. Nonetheless, the founding of the present municipality is generally dated from the establishment of the Señorío de Moguer ("Seigneury of Moguer") in 1333. The Santa Clara Monastery and a Franciscan convent that later became the Corpus Christi Hospital were founded four years later. From the 1330s, the population grew rapidly, turning Moguer into an important town with a strong, economy based in agriculture, fishing, and trade through the town's river port. Moguer played an important role in the first voyage of Christopher Columbus, with Columbus receiving important support from the abbess of the Santa Clara Monastery, Inés Enríquez, the cleric Martín Sánchez and the landowner Juan Rodríguez Cabezudo. The Niño brothers played an important role in the voyage, including providing the caravel Niña. Upon the returning from the Americas, the first of Columbus's vows was fulfilled by spending a night in the church of the Santa Clara Monastery. Today, Moguer and nearby Palos de la Frontera are home to the lugares colombinos, a tourist route of places associated with undertaking that voyage.

Moguer's river port continued to be an important site for seafaring and trade, exporting the local wines and other merchandise to the Americas, Russia and other European countries. Viticulture remained the economic engine into the early 20th century, when the chemical plant at Huelva and, above all, the development of the cultivation of the garden strawberry drove a new period of economic development and demographic growth. As of 2008, 2,278 hectares (5,630 acres) in the municipality are devoted to growing strawberries, 27.5 percent of the national total of 8,296 hectares (20,500 acres), making Moguer Spain's leading municipality in this crop.

The municipality of Moguer is formed by the urban centres of Moguer and Mazagón, the agricultural zones with both irrigated and rain-fed crops, and forest areas composed of the Monte Público of the municipality of Moguer and of protected natural areas.

Besides being one of the lugares colombinos, Moguer is also known as the birthplace of poet Juan Ramón Jiménez, winner of the Nobel Prize for Literature and author of Platero y yo.

== Geography ==
=== Location ===
Moguer is in the southwestern part of the Iberian Peninsula, in the so-called Tierra Llana ("Flatland") of the province of Huelva. On the north it is bounded by the Río Tinto, the municipalities of Huelva, Niebla and San Juan del Puerto; on the south by the Atlantic Ocean and Palos de la Frontera; on the west by the Río Tinto and Palos de la Frontera; and on the east by Almonte and Lucena del Puerto.

The urban centre of Moguer is located at 37° 16′ N, 6° 50′ W, at an altitude of 51 metres (167 ft), 19 kilometres (12 mi) from the provincial capital Huelva, and 80 kilometres (50 mi) from the Andalusian capital Seville. It is very close to Palos de la Frontera, and 20 kilometres (12 mi) from the beaches of Mazagón; all of these are within the mancomunidad Moguer-Palos de la Frontera and the larger Comarca Metropolitana de Huelva. Its surface area is 204 square kilometres (79 sq mi).

=== Road access ===
The main access to Moguer is from the north by means of the Autovía A-49/E-1 by way of the autonomic route. It can also be reached by the national N-422 and the provincial from Palos de la Frontera, the autonomic A-494 from the municipality of Almonte, and the autonomic A-486 from Lucena del Puerto.

The urban centre of Moguer is accessed from the A-494 by the avenues Hermanos Niño, Quinto Centenario, de la Virgen, and de América and from the Carretera de la Marisma by the Calle de la Ribera. The urban centre of Mazagón is accessed from the A-494 by the Avenida de los Conquistadores (west), and the Calle El Dorado, Avenida del Arroyo de la Miel, and Avenida de los Conquistadores (east).

=== Terrain ===
Moguer is located in sandy clay Pliocene–Quaternary land. It can be divided into three regions: countryside, wetlands or marsh, and coast. The Río Tinto and its marsh make up the predominant landscape of the northern part of the municipality. On the south are 13 kilometres (8.1 mi) of virgin beaches and the sand hills and gullies of the Arenas Gordas. The rest of the territory is the countryside, cut by the streams Galarín and Montemayor, tributaries of the Río Tinto; other streams are the Arroyo de Angorrilla, Arroyo de la Monjas, Cañada del Peral and Arroys de la Grulla in the Domingo Rubio estuary, and the Arroyo de las Madres in the Las Madres lagoon. In some places, lower strata have worn away, leaving curved outcroppings known as cabezos (from the Spanish cabeza, head).

=== Climate ===
Being located near the coast of the province of Huelva, Moguer has a Mediterranean climate (transitional between subtropical and temperate) with an Atlantic influence. Moguer is among the warmest and sunniest cities in Europe. The temperature regime is maritime, with an annual average of 19.2 °C (66.6 °F), and the city receives 2,984 hours of sun annually.

July is the hottest month with some temperatures exceeding 40 °C (104 °F). January is the coolest, with lows of 7 °C (45 °F) and highs of 17 °C (63 °F).

	Jan	Feb	Mar	Apr	May	Jun	Jul	Aug	Sep	Oct	Nov	Dec	Average
Average high temperature (°C)	17	17.9	20.9	22	26.2	30	34	33	29.5	25	20.9	18	24,3
Average low temperature (°C)	6.9	7.9	8.5	11	15.2	17.9	20.5	22.2	20	15.9	13.8	10.2	14.1
Precipitation (mm)	62	43	72	40	28	8	2	4	20	52	62	63	38

== Demography ==
Prior to 1333, the population was distributed among several different places within the current municipality. With the establishment of the seigneury in 1333, the population began to concentrate in the current urban center, rising to 5,000 and fluctuating around that number until the 20th century.

Between 1900 and 1970 the population of Moguer remained around 7,000–8,000. Since 1970 there has been a growth to the current 22.061 (2021, INE), the largest population in Moguer's history. Of the 22.061 habitantes, 11.059 are male (50,13%) and 11.002 female (49,87%).

A detailed analysis of the demographics of Moguer can be found in the Sistema de Información Multiterritorial de Andalucía (S.I.M.A.).

Moguer: Population graphic 1900–2023

Year	Pop.	±% p.a.
1900	8,455	—
1910	7,546	−1.13%
1920	8,028	+0.62%
1930	7,051	−1.29%
1940	6,821	−0.33%
1950	7,140	+0.46%
1960	7,222	+0.11%

Year	Pop.	±% p.a.
1970	8,068	+1.11%
1981	10,004	+1.97%
1991	12,193	+2.00%
1996	13,371	+1.86%
1998	13,749	+1.40%
1999	14,030	+2.04%
2000	14,389	+2.56%

Year	Pop.	±% p.a.
2003	15,980	+3.56%
2005	16,961	+3.02%
2007	18,381	+4.10%
2010	20,040	+2.92%
2013	21,209	+1.91%
2015	21,383	+0.41%
2017	21,514	+0.31%

Year	Pop.	±% p.a.
2020	21,867	+0.54%
2021	22,061	+0.89%
2022	22,643	+2.64%
2023	22,956	+1.38%

Source: INE; Smallest unit: 500 inhabitants

== History ==
=== Origins ===
The origin of human settlement in Moguer is lost in the remoteness of history and is surrounded by legend, as is the case for all the lands near the mouth of the Río Tinto. The current municipality of Moguer was a focus of attraction for the people of the Iberian interior and of the eastern Mediterranean since ancient times, as evidenced by Neolithic, Phoenician and Roman archaeological remains. Between the years 150 BCE – 114 BCE Hispano-Romans established industries along the river Urium (Tinto), a natural route for travel and commerce used by various cultures over the course of history. Originally Urium was a Roman town with a tower for defense, built roughly between the 1st century BCE and 2nd century CE. Remains of amphorae, coins, bricks, tegulae with potter's marks and a fragment of 2nd-century CE Terra sigillata (a type of decorated pottery) confirm the existence of several Roman settlements with the limits of the present-day municipality of Moguer.

=== Middle Ages ===
With the arrival of Muslims the farmstead of Mogauar or Mogur belonged to the Taifa of Niebla. Surviving buildings from this period include the Almohad Castle of Moguer, the underground reservoir which is under the parade ground, the fountain known as the Fuente de Pinete, the Fuente de Montemayor, and archaeological remains of Arab settlements in the rural zones of Rendón, las Cacerías, and Manzote.

During the Reconquista, Moguer was conquered by the Order of Santiago around 1239–1240, along with other enclaves of historic Algarve, and annexed to Castile.

=== Señorío de Moguer ===
In 1333, the village of Moguer became the first seigneury in the area, granted by Alfonso XI of Castile to Alonso Jofré Tenorio, Staff Admiral (Almirante Mayor) of Castile. Under this nobleman, Moguer became a prosperous town. Besides the existing Almohad castle, Moguer acquired the Monastery of Santa Clara and a Franciscan convent. On his death, the seigneury passed to his daughter María Tenorio, wife of Martín Femández Portocarrero, and later to their son Alonso Femández Portocarrero, to whose lineage it would remain connected. The Casa de Portocarrero enlarged the town with the construction of the 15th-century San Francisco Convent; the old Franciscan convent became the Corpus Christi Hospital, a hospital for the poor.

The House of Portocarrero were Grandees, wealthy upper nobility, with close connections to the royal court. In 1375 the Señorío de Moguer became a majorat (Spanish: mayorazgo). Like any feudal lords, the lords of Moguer exercised control over the municipal government. Moguer soon became a prominent Andalusian fishing town, thanks mainly to the Portocarrero's policy of attracting additional settlement.

The town of Moguer gained distinction for various services provided to the Crown by its successive lords. In 1369, Henry II of Castile granted it the title of Muy Leal ("Very Loyal"); in 1642, Philip IV of Spain designated Moguer a city, and gave its council the right to use the coat of arms of the Portocarrero; and in 1779, Charles III distinguished it again with the titles of Muy Noble and Muy Leal ("Very Noble" and "Very Loyal"). Because of this, Moguer is known as the "Very Noble and twice Very Loyal City" of Moguer.

=== Moguer and Columbus's first voyage ===
The economy of Moguer in the 15th century was based in agriculture, fishing, and mercantile activities. in 1489 the Catholic Monarchs Isabella and Ferdinand granted a seguro (?) to ships arriving at the river port of Moguer from the Canary Islands, North Africa and Atlantic European countries. Beginning in the 15th century, Moguer had a loading wharf for loading and discharging merchandise, a carriageway, shipyards, and an alota that was, together with Huelva and Palos, among the most active on the Huelva coast.

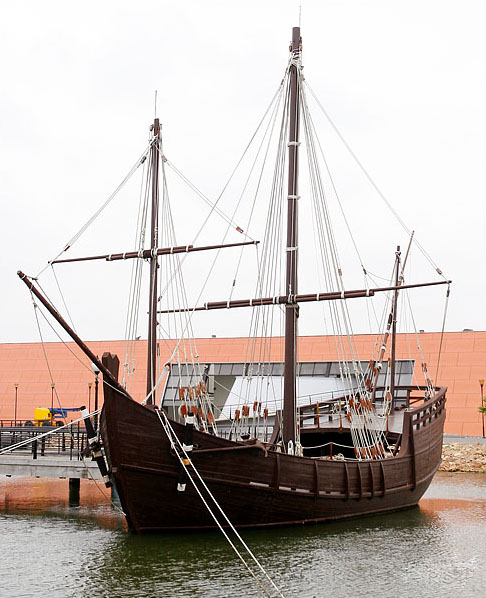
Replica of the caravel Niña, which belonged to the Niño brothers of Moguer.

Toward the end of the 15th century, the town had a population of about 5,000, and a city centre with several arterial roads, dominated by the Paris Church of Our Lady of Granada, the castle, the San Francisco convent and the Santa Clara monastery. There was much economic activity and the many ships visited the port. This was the situation of Moguer when it played a significant role in the first voyage of Christopher Columbus.

Moguer provided some of the sailors for the voyage, as well as the caravel, Niña, built in Moguer around 1488 and apparently owned by the Niño brothers of Moguer. On several occasions, Columbus came to Moguer seeking help. Ultimately, he gained the important support of the Niño brothers; the cleric Martín Sánchez; the landowner Juan Rodríguez Cabezudo (who took custody of Columbus's son Diego while Columbus went on his first voyage); and Inés Enríquez, abbess of the Santa Clara Monastery and aunt of King Ferdinand.

The Catholic Monarchs had ordered the towns of the Andalusian coasts to provide assistance to Columbus and by means of a commission directed the town of Moguer to comply with this provision. Columbus seized two boats in Moguer in the presence of the notary Moguer Alonso Pardo; these boats were later discarded as unsuitable on the advice of Martín Alonso Pinzón.

Later, upon his arrival from America, Columbus came promptly to the church of the Monastery of Santa Clara to fulfill a vow made when the Niña encountered a severe storm on the return voyage.

=== Early modern era ===
During the sixteenth century, the village went through an era of commercial prosperity centered on colonization of, and trade with, the Americas. Many moguereños participated in the discovery and evangelization of the new lands, among them Pedro Alonso Niño, discoverer of the coasts of Paria (Venezuela); Bartolome Ruiz, navigator, pilot on the "Famous Thirteen" expedition Francisco Pizarro and hence co-discoverer and of the Pacific; fray Antonio de Olivares, founder of the city of San Antonio, Texas; Alonso Vélez de Mendoza, leader of the group who repopulated the island of Santo Domingo (Hispaniola); the Franciscan Quintero, who accompanied the expedition of Hernán Cortés to Mexico; fray Andrés de Moguer, the first chronicler of Mexico; Diego García de Moguer, who took part with Ferdinand Magellan on the first trip around the world; and Juan Ladrillero, considered an independent discoverer of the Straits of Magellan.

The seventeenth century was a time of hardship for the Spanish monarchy, and Moguer could not escape this situation. The population decreased significantly. Nonetheless, the rise of Moguer in terms of relative importance was recognized in 1642 when Philip IV granted Moguer the title of a "city" (ciudad).

The eighteenth century was characterized by economic, political and technical stability. Land, controlled in large part by the local oligarchy, continued to be much in demand by moguereños, who purchased small tracts. As for commerce, the wine industry grew, supplying Cádiz and exporting to an expanding market in the Americas, Russia and other countries in Europe, as well as supplying the Spanish Royal Navy.

The 1755 Lisbon earthquake caused extensive damage in the city, leaving only the strongest buildings standing: part of the castle, the Santa Clara Monastery and the Chapel of the Hospital. Other buildings had to be rebuilt or restored—as was the Convent of San Francisco, rebuilt in the mannerist style—or built from scratch—as were the city hall, a masterpiece of civil Baroque, or the Parish Church of Our Lady of Granada, which retained only its original 14th-century tower. Because of the dramatic 18th-century increase in the population, this church was enlarged to cathedral proportions, with five naves, the highest and widest being the central nave. For wartime services to the Crown against England, in 1779 Charles III granted the City of Moguer the titles of Muy Noble and Muy Leal ("Very Noble" and "Very Loyal").

=== Contemporary history ===
The story of 19th-century Moguer is essentially that of 19th-century Spain. At the beginning of the century, Moguer was the most populous centre in its part of Spain (7,200 inhabitants) followed by Huelva. The French invasion during the Peninsular War left a general sense of provisionality and bewilderment. Briefly in the 1822 territorial division of Spain and then permanently in the 1833 division, a province was established with Huelva as its capital, despite a long and bitter verbal struggle to make Moguer the capital of the new politico-administrative unit. Moguer remained, however, as head of a new legal district (partido judicial) and notarial and registrational districts (distritos notorial y registral) having also comarcal courts, a court of first instance and an examining magistrates court (Juzgados comarcal, de Instancia y de Instrucción). Ecclesiastically, Moguer had been the seat of the vicarage of the same name since the mid-15th century and also core of a deanery (arciprestazgo) whose area was broader than the old parish, which only extended as far as Palos de la Frontera.

The end of noble and ecclesiastical territorial privileges had a strong effect on local economic structures, especially with respect to the Church. The First Spanish Republic (1873–1874) also left its mark with the construction of road and bridge over the Río Tinto, basic infrastructures for the development of the municipality. In 1899 Moguer had 8,523 inhabitants, of whom 99 percent were farmworkers. Wine remained Moguer's fundamental product and the river natural means to export that wine, although traffic to the river port had declined sharply due to silting that decreased the depth of the channel.

On 23 December 1881, poet Juan Ramón Jiménez—author of Platero y yo and winner of the 1956 Nobel Prize for Literature—was born in the house at number 1, Calle de la Ribera. The centuries-old strategy of economic prosperity based on the wine industry was frustrated in the early 20th century by the infestation of phylloxera. The population began to decline unstoppably until the industrial development of Huelva in the 1960s and, most importantly, until the adoption of strawberries as a crop in the 1970s. Moguer is now Spain's principal producer of strawberries, which has led to great population growth in recent decades.

Now, in the early 21st century, the economy of Moguer is largely driven by the growth of strawberries and raspberries; the construction industry and service sectors are also strong.

== Economy ==
In ancient times, the economy of Moguer and its region was based in fishing and seafaring. Moguer has been connected since ancient times to the principal ports of the Mediterranean and North African coasts. This activity continued through the Middle Ages.

In the Low Middle Ages, Moguer experienced economic growth through agricultural development (including the raising of livestock). Moguer thrived thanks to the cultivation of wheat, wine grapes, esparto, hemp, and other crops, as well as continued prosperity in fishing.

During the 15th century, this was supplemented by several industries relying on ovens: soap, bread, and bricks. This period also saw the growth of agricultural warehouses and mercantile enterprises for agricultural industries. Moguer also prospered through its role in discovery and trade with the Americas.

Nonetheless, Moguer was significantly affected by Spain's deep 17th-century economic crisis. In the 18th century economic activity began to grow again, especially the trade in wine. For decades, the largest customer for Moguer's wines was the Spanish Navy.

In the 19th century, wine continued to boom, with a considerable increase in land under cultivation and a spectacular development of vineyards. The arrival in the early 20th century of phylloxera, a disease affecting vinifera grapes, was very harmful to Moguer's vineyards, but the industry has since recovered to a significant degree through the use of resistant rootstock. Moguer now belongs to Denominación de Origen (DO) Condado de Huelva.

The loss of the vineyards was partially compensated by a growth in the chemical industry, but was only finally overcome with the cultivation of strawberries in recent decades, which has driven a new period of economic development and demographic growth. At the end of the 1970s the "Las Madres" estate of started growing Fragaria x ananassa—the garden strawberry—which spread rapidly through the municipality and the rest of the province. As noted above, Moguer is by far Spain's leading producer of strawberries. More recently, this has been supplemented by the cultivation of Rubus leucodermis (raspberries), and by a growth in construction, the service sector, and tourism.

The construction sector has benefited from the growth in agriculture, which has impelled a sharp increase in the number of construction companies and real estate firms in the town, which now constitute 15 and 19 percent of non-agricultural economic activity, respectively. The commercial sector has also greatly benefited from the agricultural growth, now constituting 43 percent of non-farm economic activity.

At the same time, recent development of the urban center of Mazagón for tourism has increased the number of hotels and other short-term accommodations to constitute 12 percent of the municipal economy.

Also noteworthy is the presence in the municipality of the aerospace sector, due to the activity of the National Institute of Aerospace Technology (I.N.T.A) in its facilities at the El Arenosillo Experimentation Center (CEDEA). This headquarters of the I.N.T.A. develops its activity in the investigation of renewable energies, experimentation of newly developed rockets, carrying out scientific experiments with sounding rockets and balloons, atmospheric investigations, development tests of different types of unmanned aircraft (Drones), up to 150 kg., from the platform, and carrying out R&D programs, durability studies and testing of components and solar energy systems. CEDEA is expanding its facilities with the construction of the Center for Testing, Training and Assembly of Unmanned Aircraft (CEUS) 33, with the specific function of scientific tests, technological development, training and assembly of large unmanned aircraft (Drones). tonnage (up to 15 tons), both air, sea and land, with high performance for exclusive R&D&i purposes, for civil uses. The CEDEA-CEUS group will become the best European Center of Excellence for Unmanned Systems (Drones), and an international reference for experimentation with unmanned vehicles.

=== Agriculture ===
The local economy has long been based in seafaring and fishing, but above all in agriculture: cereals and olives, then later wine grapes, strawberries, and raspberries have long been the basis of the economy. The strong current growth is based on crop irrigation, and primarily on strawberries and, secondarily, raspberries. These have been the economic engine underlying other activities. Other rain-fed farming continues in the traditional growing area near the town of Moguer, but is less profitable.

The irrigation has been made possible by community three groupings of growers: C.R. de Valdemar, C.R. de Palos and C.R. del Fresno.

The businessman Antonio Medina Lama began the first local experiments with growing strawberries on his "La Madre" farm in the late 1970s. Over the years, cultivation techniques were improved to the point of becoming the basis of the local economy. Berries are grown by intensive hydroponic methods in transparent plastic tunnels, on top of a black plastic base, using drip irrigation to supply water and nutrients.

Strawberry cultivation in Spain
	Hectares
Spain	8,296
Andalusia	7,060
Huelva (province)	6,800
Moguer	2,278

As of 2008, 2,278 hectares (5,630 acres) in the municipality are devoted to growing strawberries, making Moguer Spain's leading municipality in this crop. Moguer's production is 27.5 percent of the national total of 8,296 hectares (20,500 acres) and 32.3 percent of the Andalusian total 7,060 hectares (17,400 acres) nearly all of which (6,800 hectares (17,000 acres)) is in the province of Huelva.

In the 2000s, production has diversified to include raspberries, Japanese persimmon and Northern highbush blueberry.

== Administration and municipal infrastructure ==
=== Municipal buildings ===
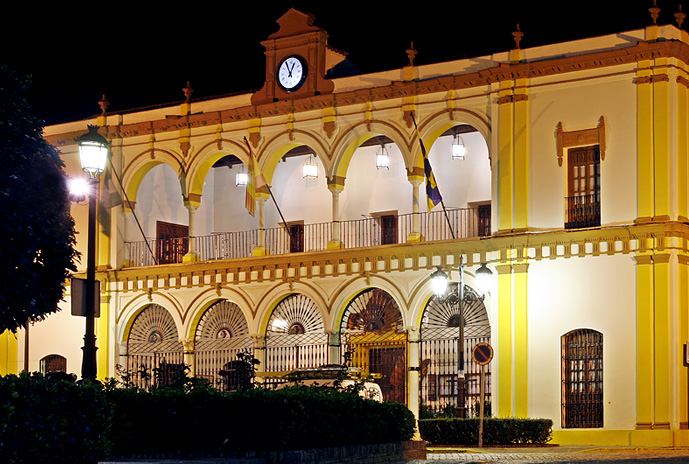
The Casa Consistorial.

The municipal hall (Spanish: ayuntamiento), known as the Casa Consistorial, is located in the Plaza del Cabildo, in the historic center of Moguer. Expansion of local government in recent years has been accommodated by new buildings, rather than by adding onto this small historic building. Social Affairs (Asuntos Sociales) is located on Calle Daniel Vázquez Díaz and Urban Planning (Urbanismo) on Calle Andalucía. The municipal archive also has a new facility, opened in 1994 in a portion of the San Francisco Convent. The most recent archives remain on the upper floor of the municipal hall.

=== Municipal politics ===
In the municipal and regional elections of 2023 the Gustavo Cuellar Cruz of left-of-centre Spanish Socialist Workers' Party-Andalusia (Partido Socialista Obrero Español-Andalucía, PSOE-A), was reelected to the mayoralty, which he has held since 2011.

The Municipal Corporation comprises 21 councillors. In the municipal elections of May 27, 2019, the left-of-centre Spanish Socialist Workers' Party-Andalusia (Partido Socialista Obrero Español-Andalucía, PSOE-A) won 12 council seats with 54.03 percent of the votes, while the People's Party (Partido Popular, PP) won 7 seats with 29.74 percent. The Asociación de Vecinos de Mazagón (AVEMA, the Neighborhood Association of Mazagón) won 2 seats and 12.3 percent of the votes.

List of mayors of Moguer since the democratic elections of 1979
1979–1983	Julián Gamón Domínguez	UCD
1983–1987	Francisco Díaz Olivares	PSOE-A
1987–1991	Francisco Díaz Olivares	PSOE-A
1991–1995	Francisco Díaz Olivares; Rosario Ballester Angulo (from 1994)	PSOE-A
1995–1999	Manuel Burgos Cruzado	PP
1999–2003	Rosario Ballester Angulo	PSOE-A
2003–2007	Juan José Volante Padilla	PP
2007–2011	Juan José Volante Padilla	PP
2011–2015	Gustavo Cuéllar	PSOE-A
2015–2019	Gustavo Cuéllar	PSOE-A
2019–2023	Gustavo Cuéllar	PSOE-A
2023	Gustavo Cuéllar	PSOE-A

The fourth Thursday of each month, at 20:00, the Council of Moguer holds its plenary sessions, open to the public at large. The sessions of the commission of government are on the first and third Friday of each month. The informative committees "Urban and Internal Regime", "Social Welfare", and "Economy and Development" are held on the first, second and third Thursday, respectively. Other components of local administration are the Municipal Culture Foundation, the Municipal Patronate of Sports and the company housing and land company "Envisur".

=== Security forces ===
The city of Moguer has three types of security forces:

- The local police, headquartered in the Casa Consistorial, on the side facing Calle Obispo Infante, with about 30 officers.
- The Civil Guard (Guardia Civil), with a barracks on the Avenida de la Constitución.
- Civil defense (Protección Civil), in the Plaza 12 de Octubre, with a significant number of volunteers.

=== Judicial administration ===
Moguer is seat of legal district (partido judicial) number 6 of the province of Huelva, encompassing the towns of Moguer, Niebla, Bonares, Lucena del Puerto, and Palos de la Frontera. The court facilities are located on the Calle de San Francisco and consist of two courts of first instance and an examining magistrates court.

=== Health ===
Moguer has two health centres, both part of the Andalusian Health Service (Servicio Andaluz de Salud, SAS):

- Health Centre of Moguer: Located on Calle Castillo, 6.
- Health Centre of Mazagón: Located on Calle Buenos Aires, no number.

=== Education ===
The town has the following schools:

- Nursery schools: Two municipal schools (C.A.S.E.I. Municipal El gato con botas ("Puss in Boots") in Moguer and C.A.S.E.I. Municipal El Farito (diminutive of Faro, "lighthouse") in Mazagón and the private El barquito de papel ("The Little Paper Boat") in Moguer.
- Early childhood education and primary schools: Pedro Alonso Niño School, Virgin of Montemayor School, Zenobia Camprubí School (all in Moguer) and El Faro School in Mazagón.
- Secondary schools: Juan Ramón Jiménez Institute of Secondary Education and Francisco Garfias Institute of Secondary Education in Moguer, El Faro Institute of Secondary Education in Mazagón.
- Continuing education (Educación Permanente): Camarina Section in Moguer and El Vígia Section in Mazagón.

=== Sports ===
The municipality has two multi-sport centres (polideportivos):

- Polideportivo de Moguer: Located on Avenida del V Centenario. It consists of two football (soccer) fields, one of albero (a type of soil also used in bullrings) and the other of artificial turf, with bleachers; a running track for athletics goes around the perimeter of the latter; four paddleball courts; an area of sand for beach volleyball; two covered pavilions with bleachers; two covered multi-sport facilities; six outdoor courts: two for futsal, two for tennis, and one each for basketball and volleyball; and an outdoor pool.
- Polideportivo de Mazagón: Located on avenida de Santa Clara. It consists of one football (soccer) field of albero, with bleachers; a covered pavilion with bleachers; four outdoor courts: one for futsal, one for tennis, and two for basketball.

There are several teams that compete in these facilities. The most notable is the Club Balonmano Pedro Alonso Niño, which plays in the national first division for handball.

== Natural areas ==
Over 60 percent of the Moguer municipality remains in a natural state. Only some of these natural areas have protected status. Among those that are unprotected are the Monte Público of the municipality of Moguer. The protected areas are:

- Doñana Natural Park: Presents different coastal ecosystems: dunes, forests, lakes and wetland areas. 3,200 hectares (7,900 acres) of the park are within the municipality of Moguer. The park as a whole is considered the largest ecological reserve in Europe. Declared World Heritage Site by UNESCO in 1994. In 2006 the park received 376,287 visitors.
- Paraje Natural Laguna de las Madres y Palos. Located in the municipalities of Moguer and Palos de la Frontera; has a wide variety of animal and plant species.
- Dehesa del Estero Domingo Rubio and corridor. Located adjacent to Doñana Natural Park, this pine meadow along the Domingo Rubio estuary has been designated a Site of Community Importance, and is the head of the Paraje Natural Estero Domingo Rubio. Flora include stone pine, with an understory including rockrose, mastic, palmetto. Fauna include wild boar, otters, grey and purple herons, northern shoveler ducks, cattle egrets, and chameleons
- Marismas y Riberas del Tinto ("Marshes and banks of the Río Tinto"): Site of Community Importance.
- Playas de Mazagón ("Beaches of Mazagón"): A grouping of beaches and the sand hills and gullies of the Arenas Gordas. Part of this area is protected as a Site of Community Importance, but the urban center of Mazagón also falls within this area.

== Main sights ==
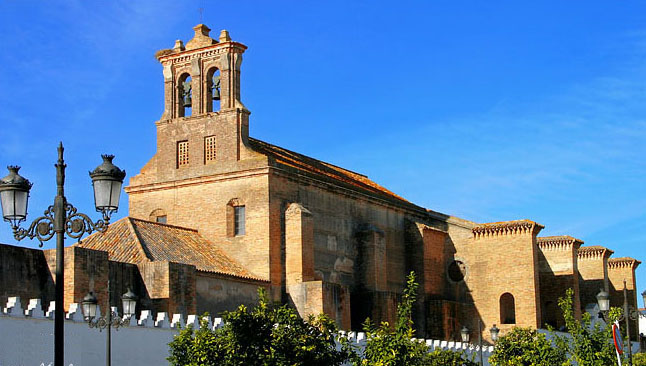
Santa Clara Monastery

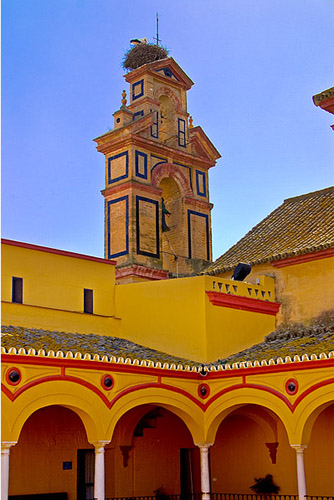
Convent of San Francisco.

- Santa Clara Monastery. Founded in 1337 by Alonso Jofre Tenorio. Listed as a National monuments since 1931. The most important of the lugares colombinos (associated with the first voyage of Christopher Columbus) in Moguer; site of the fulfillment of one of Columbus's vows.
- Casa Consistorial (Town Hall, late 18th century)
- Birthplace House of Nobel Prize Juan Ramón Jiménez
- Zenobia and Juan Ramón Jiménez House Museum . This 18th-century house conserves belongings, books and personal belongings of Juan Ramón
- Moguer Castle, an Almohad building renovated and enlarged in the 14th century. Origins date back to a Roman villa. In its interior is an interesting cistern (aljibe) of two bays, believed to be Almohad
- San Fernando Castle
- Moguer Parish Cemetery. Includes the Panteón Zenobia y Juan Ramón ("Zenobia and Juan Ramón Jiménez Pantheon") and the Hermitage of San Sebastián. The Baroque hermitage was built between the 16th and 18th centuries, and is commonly known as the Capilla de Jesús ("Chapel of Jesus").
- Santa Cruz de Vista Alegre Estate. Rural residence of Juan Ramón Jiménez; provides a panoramic view of Moguer.
- Parish Church of Our Lady of Granada. Built in the 18th century on the ruins of the former Mudéjar 14th-century parish church.
- Pinete Fountain (Fuente de Pinete): 13th-century Mudéjar fountain and temple, with four sides, two of them open, located in the old Camino Real de Seville.
- Chapel of the Hospital of Corpus Christi. This Gothic–Mudéjar building was erected in the 14th century, as part of the first male monastery erected in Moguer, the old San Francisco Convent, later Corpus Christi hospital.
- Puerto de la Ribera. Old river port which had a loading dock, dry dock and shipyards. The caravel La Niña was built here between 1487 and 1490.
- Convent of St. Francis, begun in the late 15th century, but the church was not completed until the 1570s and the cloister until the 17th century. It is now the seat of the Municipal Historical Archives and Library Iberoamericana.
- Montemayor Hermitage. The current building is a mix of 15th-, 18th-, and 20th-century work, due to repeated renovation.

== Notable people ==
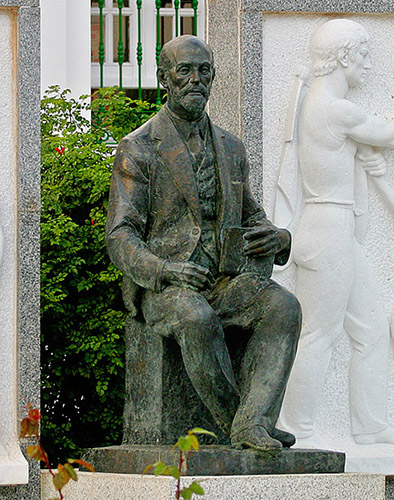
Monument to Juan Ramón Jiménez, Plaza del Cabildo (Moguer).

Many moguereños have distinguished themselves as mariners; others have distinguished themselves in the Church, politics, and the arts.

- The Niño brothers were members of a renowned family of moguereño mariners, who participated actively in Christopher Columbus's Voyages.
- On December 23, 1881 Juan Ramón Jiménez was born in the house at number 2, Calle de la Ribera de Moguer. A few years later his parents moved to an 18th-century house located in the finest part of the city, on the Calle Nueva.
- Alonso Jofre Tenorio (?–1340), Grand Admiral of the Sea and first Señor (lord) of Moguer.
- The Portocarrero family, an important noble family settled in Andalusia after the Reconquista; Señores of Moguer 1356–1703.
- Cristóbal García del Castillo (c. 1458–1539), captain of the Royal Brotherhood of Knights of Andalusia (Real Hermandad de Caballeros de Andalucía). Founded the city of Telde on Grand Canary island.
- Luis de Torres, Juan de Jérez, Juan de Moguer, Francisco García Vallejos, Juan Quintero, Juan Vecano, Juan Arraez, Alonso de Morales, Maestre Alonso, Bartolomé Roldán, Diego Leal, and others sailed with Columbus and the Niño brothers on the first voyage to the Americas.
- Alonso Vélez de Mendoza (?–c.1511), commander of the Order of Santiago and explorer of the Brazilian coast.
- Diego García de Moguer (1484–1554), pilot, explored the South American coast as far as the Río de la Plata and discovered the Chagos Archipelago and the island of Diego Garcia.
- Diego Rodríguez de Lucero, priest and inquisitor of the Kingdom of Castile based in Córdoba between 1499 and 1507
- Juan Ladrillero (1505–1559), pilot, independent discoverer of the Straits of Magellan.
- Bartolomé Ruiz, pilot for the Famous Thirteen who accompanied Francisco Pizarro in the discovery of Peru.
- Fray Andrés de Moguer (c.1500–1577), Dominican friar and first chronicler of the work of the friars of Santo Domingo in the en el virreinato de Viceroyalty of New Spain.
- Felipe Godínez Manrique (1585–1659), playwright of the Spanish Golden Age; his plays were performed at Court and in the Americas.
- Fray Antonio de Olivares (1630–1722), priest who traveled extensively in the Americas. Founder of San Antonio, Texas; first priest to perform a mass in Texas.
- Luis Hernández-Pinzón Álvarez (1816–1891), a direct descendant of the Pinzón brothers of Palos and Admiral of the Spanish Navy in the era of Isabel II of Spain; commanded the Pacific squadron in the war against Peru for the control of guano resources.
- Ildefonso Joaquín Infante y Macías (1813–1888), bishop of Tenerife 1877–1886.
- La Parrala (Dolores Parrales, 1845–1914), flamenco singer to whom Lorca dedicated one of the poems in his Poema del cante Jondo.
- Manuel Gómez Contioso (1877–1936), Salesian priest shot in Málaga during the Spanish Civil War, beatified by Pope Benedict XVI October 28, 2007, along with 497 other religious figures executed in the war.
- Rafael Romero Barros (1832–1895), painter. Father and teacher of Julio Romero de Torres.
- Manuel de Burgos y Mazo (1862–1946), Restoration-era politician, leader of the Liberal-Conservative Party in the province of Huelva during that period. Minister of Grace in the government of 1917; Minister of Justice in the government of 1919.
- Alejandro Rodríguez Gómez ("Xandro Valerio", 1896–1966), poet known for his copla (meter), including "La Parrala" and "Tatuaje" ("The Tattoo").
- Eulalia Ruiz de Clavijo (1904–2000), first female prosecutor in the Spanish courts.
- Francisco Garfias López (1921–), winner of the National Prize for Poetry in 1971 with his poetry collection La Duda ("Doubt"). Also known as a scholar of the work of Juan Ramón Jiménez and editor of his work.
- José Manuel Sierra Méndez (1978–), handball player, who won gold medals at both the 2013 World Men's Handball Championship and the 2005 Mediterranean Games.

== Craftsmanship and gastronomy ==
Moguer is heir to a rich artisanal tradition: coopering, bobbin lace, embroidery, saddlemaking, and the making of traditional Andalusian costumes, among other things.

Moguer's cuisine features cuttlefish (chocos) with beans, skate in paprika, school shark marinated in adobo, white shrimp, bean clams (coquinas) and other species of clam (almejas), wedge sole, true sole, and croakers. Its fruity white wines and a wine made from oranges are produced under the Denominación de Origen (DO) Condado de Huelva.

Other characteristic products are a pastry known as "La Victoria", vermouth from the Sáenz cellars, and, of course, strawberries.

== Culture and traditions ==
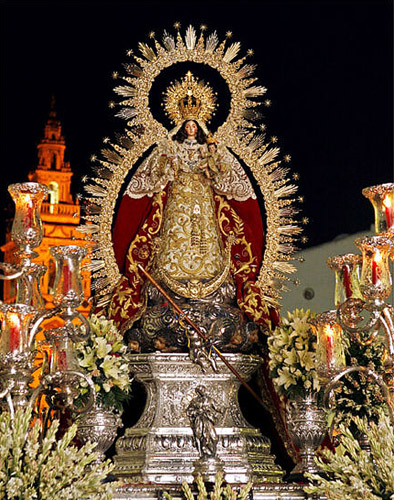
Our Lady of Montemayor during the September 8 procession through the streets of Moguer.

In addition to its monuments and its streets, the history of Moguer is reflected today in various festivities and celebrations that occur throughout the year.

The evening in honor of Our Lady of Montemayor, known in Moguer as Days of Our Lady, has been held on or around September 8 without interruption since the Late Middle Ages to worship Moguer's patron saint. At the end of August, a solemn novena begins in her honor in the Parish Church of Our Lady of Granada, to culminate with the Principal Function of the Institute and the procession of the Señora through the city's streets for the day of the Nativity of Mary, September 8. Meanwhile, for about five days, the festival continues in a more playful for in town fairground, which has more than 250 booths.

The Pilgrimage of Our Lady of Montemayor takes place every second weekend of May in the pine forests surrounding the shrine of the patron. On this weekend, thousands of pilgrims come to the precinct to venerate the "Queen of the Pinares (Pine forests)". At present there are eight filial brotherhoods (hermandades) spread over the provinces of Huelva, Seville and Madrid dedicated to the patron saint of Moguer, who also participate in this celebration.

Easter in Moguer has a special significance, as is evidenced by the various brotherhoods that process from Palm Sunday until Holy Saturday. Currently eight confraternities (cofradías) conduct the stations of penance: Hermandad de la Borriquita ("Brotherhood of the little donkey") on Palm Sunday, Holy Monday the Hermandad del Cristo de los Remedios ("Brotherhood of Christ of the Remedies"), Holy Tuesday the Hermandad del Cristo de la Sangre ("Brotherhood of Christ of the Blood'), Holy Wednesday the Hermandad del Cristo de la Victoria ("Brotherhood of the Victory"), Holy Thursday the Hermandad de la Oración en el Huerto ("Brotherhood of the prayer in the orchard"), Good Friday in the dawn hours the Hermandad de Padre Jesus ("Brotherhood of Father Jesus) and in the evening the Hermandad de la Veracruz ("Brotherhood of the True Cross"), and on Holy Saturday the Hermandad del Santo Entierro ("Brotherhood of the Holy Tomb").

The Romería del Rocío is a pilgrimage to the village of El Rocío on Pentecost weekend. It has a deep association with this community. It is believed that the Hermandad filial de Nª Sª del Rocío de Moguer ("Filial brotherhood of Our Lady of El Rocío de Moguer) dates from the end of the 17th century; documents from the 18th century attest to the celebration of this pilgrimage by faithful moguereños. Juan Ramón Jiménez in Platero y yo wrote an entire chapter about the Romería del Rocío:

Platero – I said to him – we're going to wait for the Carts. The sound came from the faraway forest of Doñana, the mystery of the pine barren of Las Animas, the freshness of Las Madres and the two Fresnos, the smell of la Rocina...

They passed, first on burros, mules and horses dressed in the Moorish style and manes braided, the happy pairs...
Behind the carts, like beds, hung in white...
And the majordomo -¡Viva! Long live the Virgin of Rocíoooooo!
¡Vivaaaaa!, – bald, dry, red, his wide-brimmed hat pushed back and the golden rod resting in the stirrup....

Platero, then, folded his hands and like a woman he kneeled – a skill of his! -, gentle, humble, and consenting.

— From "El Rocío"; chapter XLVII of Platero y yo, by Juan Ramón Jiménez.

Corpus Christi. On this occasion the entire route of the procession is dressed out in sedges and is filled with pilgrims and altars.

There are, throughout the year, other cultural activities related to the discovery of the Americas and to Juan Ramón Jiménez. On March 16 is the celebration of Columbus's fulfillment of his vow and the Santa Clara Monastery; Columbus's departure is celebrated on August 3, and the discovery itself on October 12. Juan Ramón is commemorated in several ways by the Fundación Juan Ramón Jiménez. Their highest award, the "Perejil de plata" ("Silver Parsley"), is given out annually, as is the "Premio Hispanoamericano de poesía Juan Ramón Jiménez" ("Juan Ramón Jiménez Prize for Hispano-American Poetry")

There is also an annual Festival de Cante Flamenco de Moguer ("Moguer Festival of Flamenco Singing"), organized by the Peña de Cante Jondo de Moguer on the second weekend in July.

== Twin towns and sister cities ==
Moguer is twinned with the following cities:

- Jerez de los Caballeros, Spain
- Malgrat de Mar, Spain
- Telde, Spain
- (United States) San Antonio, USA

== See also ==
- Lugares colombinos
- List of municipalities in Huelva
