= Fontanilla =

Former public fountain in Spain

Coordinates: 37.23139°N 6.89092°W

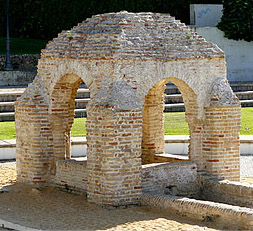
The Fontanilla, in Palos de la Frontera.

The Fontanilla is the former public fountain of Palos de la Frontera in Spain where, according to tradition, these fountains provided the water for the ships of Christopher Columbus's first voyage—the Santa María, the Niña, and the Pinta—when, on 3 August 1492, they departed from Palos de la Frontera, captained by Columbus and by Palos's own Pinzón Brothers upon the voyage widely considered to have led the "discovery" of what historians term the "New World".

La Fontanilla is the least dramatic, but perhaps the most original and authentic monument among the so-called Lugares colombinos, the places in Huelva closely associated with Columbus's first voyage.

== Origin and architectural style ==
There were two places where water was drawn in Palos: the fountain of Villafrías, at the exit of the estuary, facing the Isla de Saltés, and the Fontanilla, outside of the historic center of the city, but immediately to its east. An estuary of the Río Tinto came practically to its base, with a pier that provided the most direct access to the town from the sea. This was almost certainly the pier from which Columbus's ships departed.

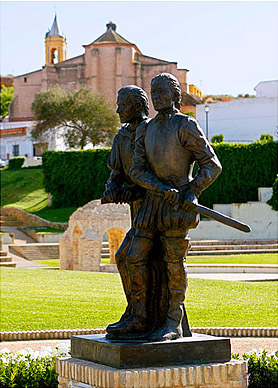
Monument to the Pinzón Brothers, near the Fontanilla, in Palos.

On the way from the Puerta de los Novios of the Church of Saint George the Martyr (Iglesia de San Jorge Mártir), walking toward the nearby site of the former pier, one finds the Fontanilla, the former public fountain constructed on a base that dates back to Roman times, and protected by a tetrapylum, a sort of gazebo, constructed of stone in the 13th century in the Mudéjar style, with a quadrangular base, with the protective roof having a hemispheric vaulted exterior and a pyramidal interior. The support consists of four slightly depressed semicircular arches, supported on angular pillar reinforced by abutments.

When the fountain was actually in use, the fountain proper was in the center, and the sides were open gutters where the water ran, gathering on the eastern side in a long trough. The most recent studies have shown that it was stuccoed and painted in ochre with religious motifs, a circumstance that, together with it being at the entrance to the city, suggests that in addition to being the public fountain and a place of rest and cooling off for those who arrived at the town, whether from the dock or by road, it also may have been a cruz de término or humilladero (a type of roadside shrine at the entrance to a town) or a place of penitence, a place of prayer and reflection intended to give repose both to the body and the soul. In this sense, it could be compared to other humilladeros in Andalusia, for example the Cruz del Campo in Seville, so related to the origin of the celebrations of Holy Week in Seville.

Currently, the Fontanilla is restored with a brick finish. The gargoyle at the exit is the only wooden element, and one can view the Fontanilla either from the road into Palos from Moguer, or from a viewpoint on the heights of the hill of the settled part of town, looking toward its surrounding gardens.
