= Alonso Vélez de Mendoza =

Commander Alonso Vélez de Mendoza of the Order of Santiago was born in Moguer, Spain in the late 15th century. On June 6, 1499, he obtained a license from the Catholic Monarchs to sail to the Indies, which authorized him to take four caravels, although ultimately he only chartered two. They were supposed to head north to start the exploration of the coast of North America, or perhaps to enter into the competition of the Brazilian exploration.

By October 1500, they successfully passed south of Cape St. Augustine, which was the first time that a Spanish ship succeeded. He continued descending until he reached a river called Cervutos. Later it was realized his discoveries had a double consequence.

- On one hand, he demonstrated that the end of St. Augustine was not an island but actually belonged to a continent and that, on having extended on the south, it was entering the Portuguese jurisdiction.
- However, having sailed towards the south, and to verify that the coast was going towards the south-west, it was discovered that the grounds were again inside the Spanish demarcation (district) opening a wide horizon of opportunities for exploration.

In May 1501, they finally returned to Seville, Spain with Brazilian slaves, although without finding the southern tip of the continent which they had expected to be at the same latitude as the Cape of Good Hope

On February 15, 1502, Alonso Vélez de Mendoza earned a capitulation which allowed him to settle in Hispaniola with fifty settlers and their families, in order to create a new population. There was a fleet of thirty other ships carrying 2,500 colonists that arrived in Hispaniola the same year. This included the arrival of Nicolás de Ovando y Cáceres, the new Spanish Governor of Hispaniola, along with the conquistador Francisco Pizzaro. It is believed that Alonso died at the end of 1511.

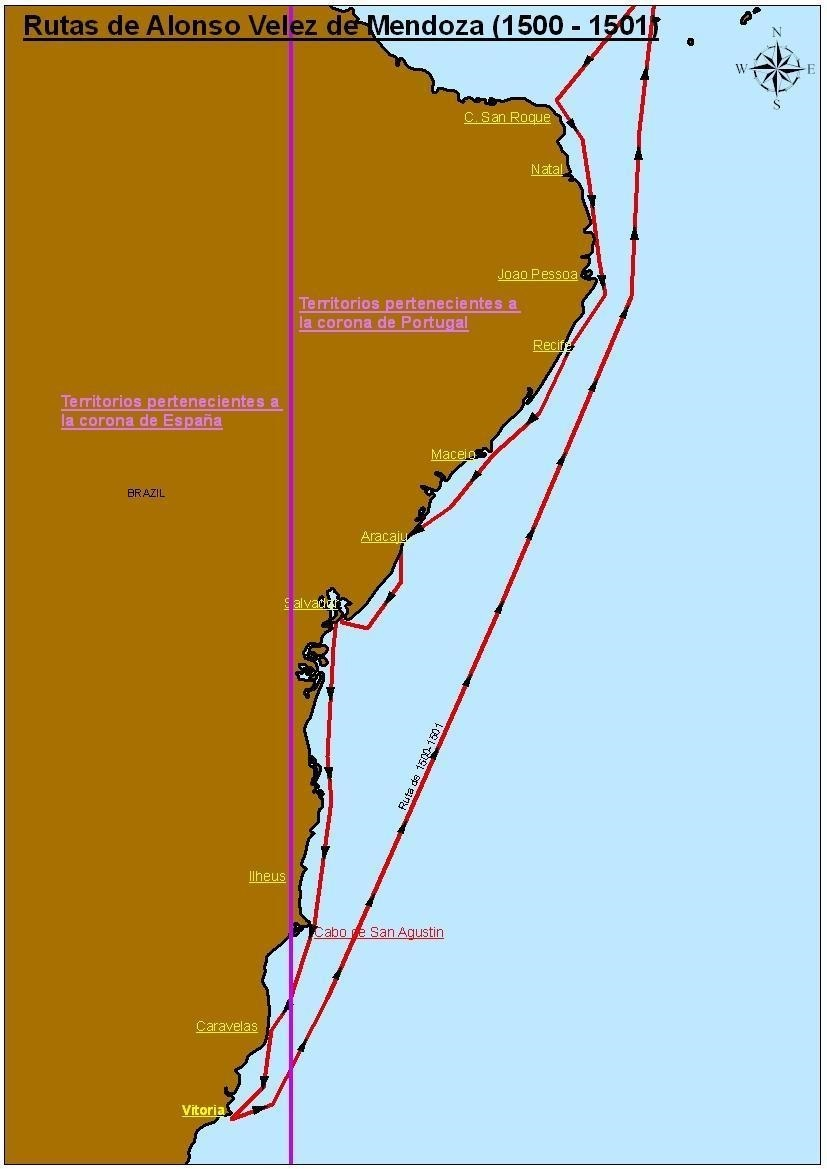
Alonso Velez was an explorer
