= Mazagón =

Coastal town in Huelva, Andalusia, Spain

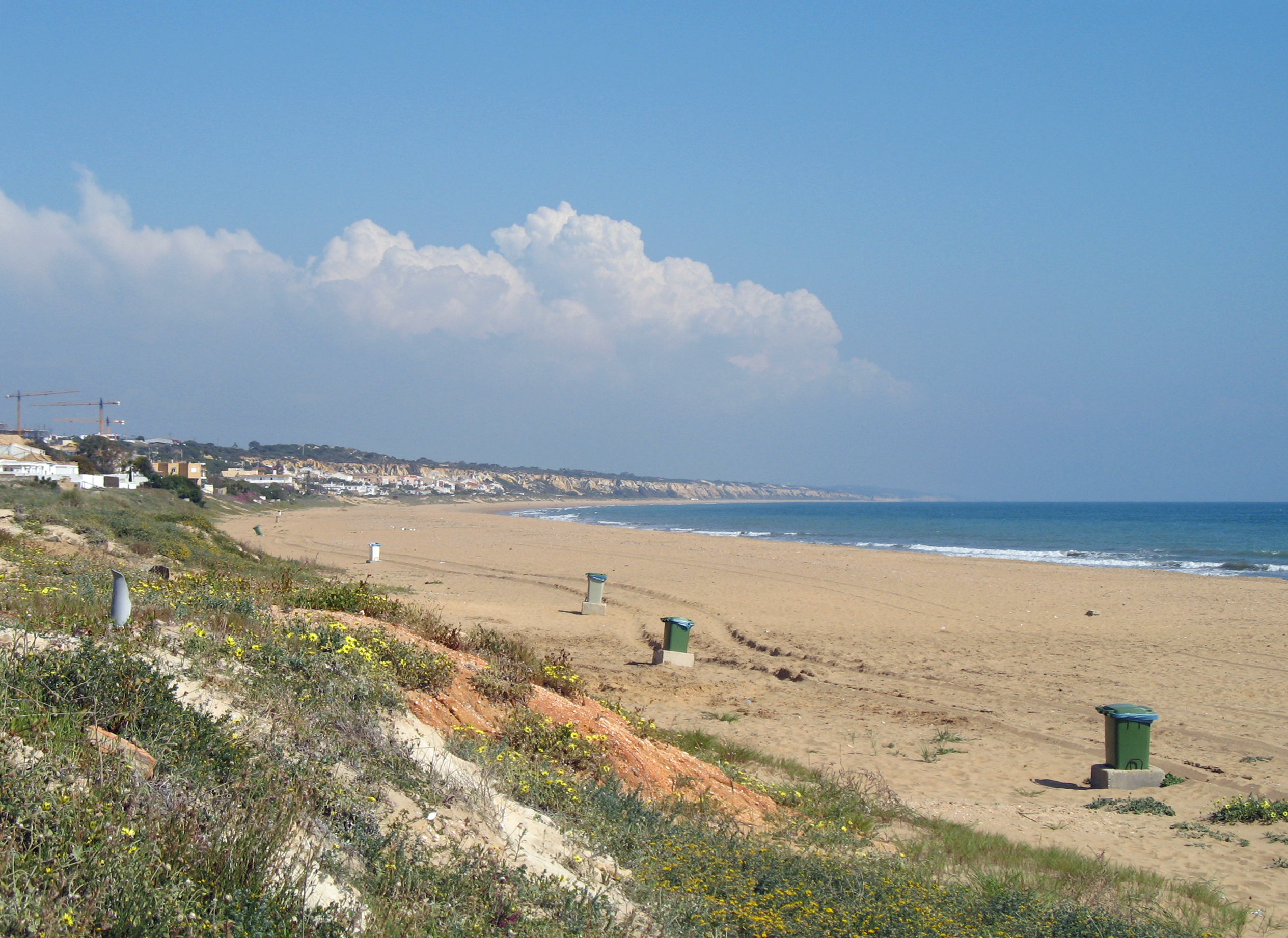

Mazagón is a town which belongs to Palos de la Frontera and Moguer, in the province of Huelva, Andalusia, Spain. A coastal town, Magazón borders the Atlantic Ocean, and is located 22 km from the province capital, Huelva. As of 2020, the town had 4152 inhabitants – 3197 in the municipality of Moguer, and 955 in the municipality of Palos de la Frontera.
