= 1492 in Spain =

- Decades: 1480s; 1490s; 1500s; 1510s
- See also: History of Spain; Timeline of Spanish history; List of years in Spain

A map of the Iberian Peninsula in 1492 highlighting the Crown of Castile.

Events of the year 1492 in Spain included the end of the Reconquista with the fall of Granada, the expulsion of the Jewish Diaspora of Spain due to the Alhambra Decree, and the start of Columbus' first voyage. It is considered the annus mirabilis of the history of Spain. It is also the beginning of the Spanish Golden Age.

== Incumbents ==
- Monarch(s):
  - the Catholic Monarchs: King Ferdinand II, Queen Isabella I
  - John III of Navarre, Catherine of Navarre

== Events ==
- 2 January: The Fall of Granada, the last remnant of Al-Andalus.
- End Of The Reconquista
- 31 March: Alhambra Decree issued
- Expulsion of Jews from Spain
- Columbus' first voyage
- 11 August: Spanish cardinal Rodrigo de Borja is elected Pope Alexander VI
- 18 August: Gramática de la lengua castellana by Antonio de Nebrija, first grammar of a modern European language
- In the kingdom of Navarre, Catherine of Navarre wins the civil war.
- Castilian troops starts the conquest of the island of La Palma in the Canary Islands.
- Possible eruption of volcano Teide in Tenerife as noted by Columbus' log.
- The ceiling of the Aljafería Palace in Zaragoza is finished.
- The novel Cárcel de amor by Diego de San Pedro is printed in Seville.

== See also ==
- Spanish Inquisition
- Exploration of North America
