= Jean Cousin (navigator) =

Jean Cousin, also spelled Jehan Cousin, was a 15th-century French navigator from Normandy. It is possible that he discovered the New World in 1488, four years before Christopher Columbus, when he landed around the mouth of the Amazon River in modern-day Brazil.

One of Cousin's captains was Martín Alonso Pinzón. Pinzon split with Cousin in a dispute after their return to Dieppe, and is claimed to have left for Spain from where he advised Columbus on his route westwards. Pinzon is known to have displayed a remarkable confidence in guiding Columbus in his discovery of the New World. No indisputable written records remain, however, to support Cousin's claim to discovery.

Cousin's route was followed in 1504 by Binot Paulmier de Gonneville on L'Espoir. This voyage was properly recorded and brought back a native named Essomericq. Gonneville affirmed that when he visited Brazil, French traders from Saint-Malo and Dieppe had already been trading there for several years.

The precedent of Jean Cousin and his fellow Norman sailors was used by Charles IX to justify the French attempts at colonizing Florida at Fort Caroline between 1564 and 1565. The area was called "Terre des Bretons" by the French.

The claim of Jean Cousin's discovery of the New World has long been affirmed in France. In 1660, Etienne Cleirac mentioned it in his Us et coustumes de la mer. The claim is also sometimes reaffirmed in contemporary popular literature.

== See also ==
- France-Americas relations
- Pre-Columbian trans-oceanic contact theories
