= Castillo de Moguer =

Castle in Moguer, Andalusia, Spain

Coordinates: 37.2739111°N 6.8400194°W

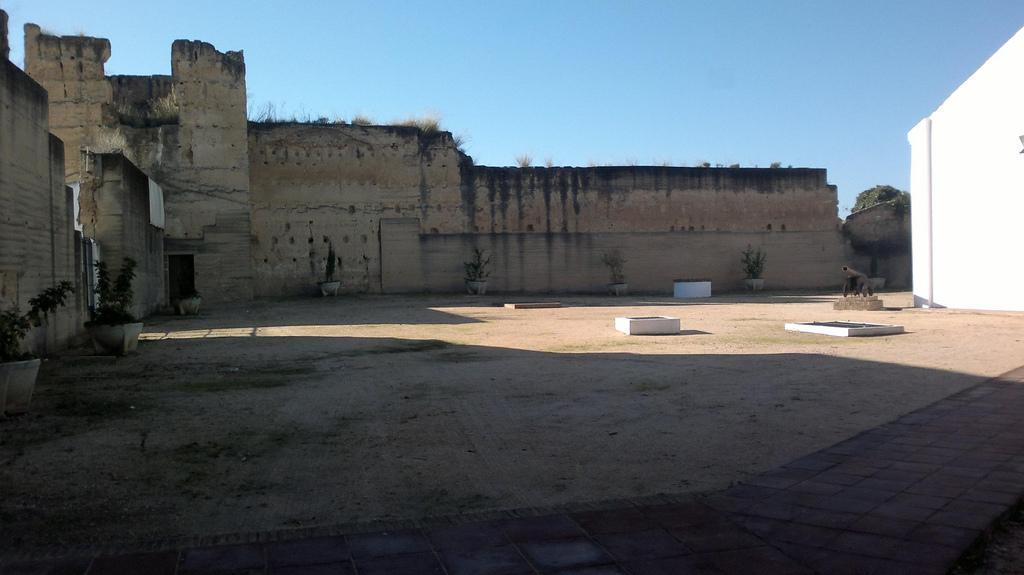
Castillo de Moguer

Castillo de Moguer is a castle in Moguer, in the province of Huelva, Spain. It was renovated and enlarged in the 14th century.

Castillo de Moguer was built of mud-based mortar gravel, clay and lime. It is of an imperfect square plan 44 by 45 metres (144 ft × 148 ft) in size, with four towers at the corners. A moat surrounded the castle, as evidenced by written records, but is not currently visible.

Access to the castle was across the northwest side, now Santo Domingo Street, via a ramp. Each tower measures 9 by 9 metres (30 ft × 30 ft) and contains two chambers with a covered brick dome. The four towers were topped by battlements. A cellar dating to the 18th century, measures 22 by 10.5 metres (72 ft × 34 ft) and serves as the headquarters of the Tourist Office.
