= Gibraleón =

- Municipality
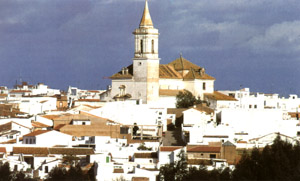

- Flag Coat of arms

- Location of Gibraleón in Spain Gibraleón (Andalusia) Gibraleón (Spain)
- Coordinates: 37°22′31″N 6°58′10″W
- Country: Spain
- Autonomous Community: Andalusia
- Province: Huelva
- Comarca: Comarca Metropolitana

Government
  - Mayor: José Ramón Gómez Cueli (PP)

Area
  - Total: 328 km^{2} (127 sq mi)
- Elevation (AMSL): 26 m (85 ft)

Population (2025-01-01)
  - Total: 13,261
  - Density: 40.4/km^{2} (105/sq mi)
- Time zone: UTC+1 (CET)
  - Summer (DST): UTC+2 (CEST (GMT +2))
- Postal code: 21500
- Area code: +34 (Spain) + 959 (Huelva)
- Website: Town Hall

Gibraleón is a town and municipality located in the province of Huelva, Spain. According to the 2025 municipal register, the municipality has a population of 13,261 inhabitants.

== See also ==
- List of municipalities in Huelva
