= Niño brothers =

Family of Spanish sailors and conquistadors

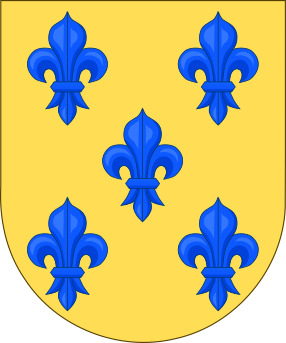

The Niño Brothers were a family of sailors and conquistadors from the town of Moguer at the end of the 15th century (in Huelva, Andalusia, Spain), who participated actively in Christopher Columbus's first voyage—generally considered to constitute the discovery of the Americas by Europeans—and other subsequent voyages to the New World.

The Niño family had a lineage of marine experts and shipowners who repeatedly crossed the Atlantic in exploration and discovery of the new continent. Pedro Alonso Niño, an accomplished navigator, assumed the pivotal role of pilot aboard the Santa María during Christopher Columbus' historic transatlantic voyage. Francisco Niño, a dedicated mariner, fulfilled the responsibilities of a sailor, providing indispensable support to the voyage's success. Juan Niño, an experienced seaman, served as the owner and master of the caravel La Niña, commanding the vessel with exceptional proficiency and precision.

These contributions made by Pedro Alonso Niño, Francisco Niño, and Juan Niño played a vital role in the success of Christopher Columbus's voyage. Their expertise and unwavering dedication to their respective roles ensured the safe and efficient navigation of the ships. It is evident that their participation was a significant factor that contributed to the discovery of the New World.

== The Niño Brothers and Columbus's first voyage ==
The three Moranos Niño brothers, Pedro Alonso, Francisco, Juan, and Pedro's son, Bartolomé, were already sailors with prestige and experience in Atlantic journeys before playing a distinguished part in Columbus's first voyage to the New World. Their friendship with the Pinzón Brothers, and especially with the oldest of them, Martín Alonso Pinzón, influenced their participation in Columbus's project. The participation of the Pinzón Brothers in the Columbian enterprise was the key to overcoming the doubts among the region's sailors; the help of the Niño Brothers made it possible to defeat the opposition among the men of Moguer to taking on an enterprise of uncertain outcome.

On Columbus's first voyage, Pedro Alonso Niño was pilot of the Santa María, Juan Niño was master of La Niña, of which he was the owner, and Francisco Niño is believed to have been a sailor on La Niña.

The Niños took part as well in Columbus's second and third voyages. Between 1499 and 1501 they traveled on their own account, with the merchants Cristóbal and Luis Guerra, following the route of Columbus's third voyage to the Gulf of Paria on the South American mainland in what is now Venezuela.

Pedro Alonso was named by the Catholic Monarchs Ferdinand and Isabella chief pilot of the Ocean Sea (the Atlantic) as recompense for his services to the crown. He was also one of the teachers of Prince John, the ill-fated son of Ferdinand and Isabella, to whom he taught the art of mapmaking.

== The Niño family ==
Little of the following is known with absolute certainty, especially with respect to Columbus's first voyage. As discussed at length in Alice Bache Gould's documented list of the participants in Columbus's first voyage, almost all of the information we have is assembled by cross-comparing numerous incomplete and sometimes mutually contradictory documents. For example, there is nothing explicit in the documents related to the expeditions to distinguish the two Francisco Niños, but certainly the pilot was not the cabin boy. It is imaginable that in some cases, where discrepancies are not so obvious, two people with the same name may have been conflated, especially because the first serious scholarly effort to create a comprehensive list of the voyagers dates from 1884, nearly four centuries after the fact. Even Juan Niño's ownership of La Niña is open to some doubts, though it is clear that he was master of the ship.

=== The Niño Brothers ===
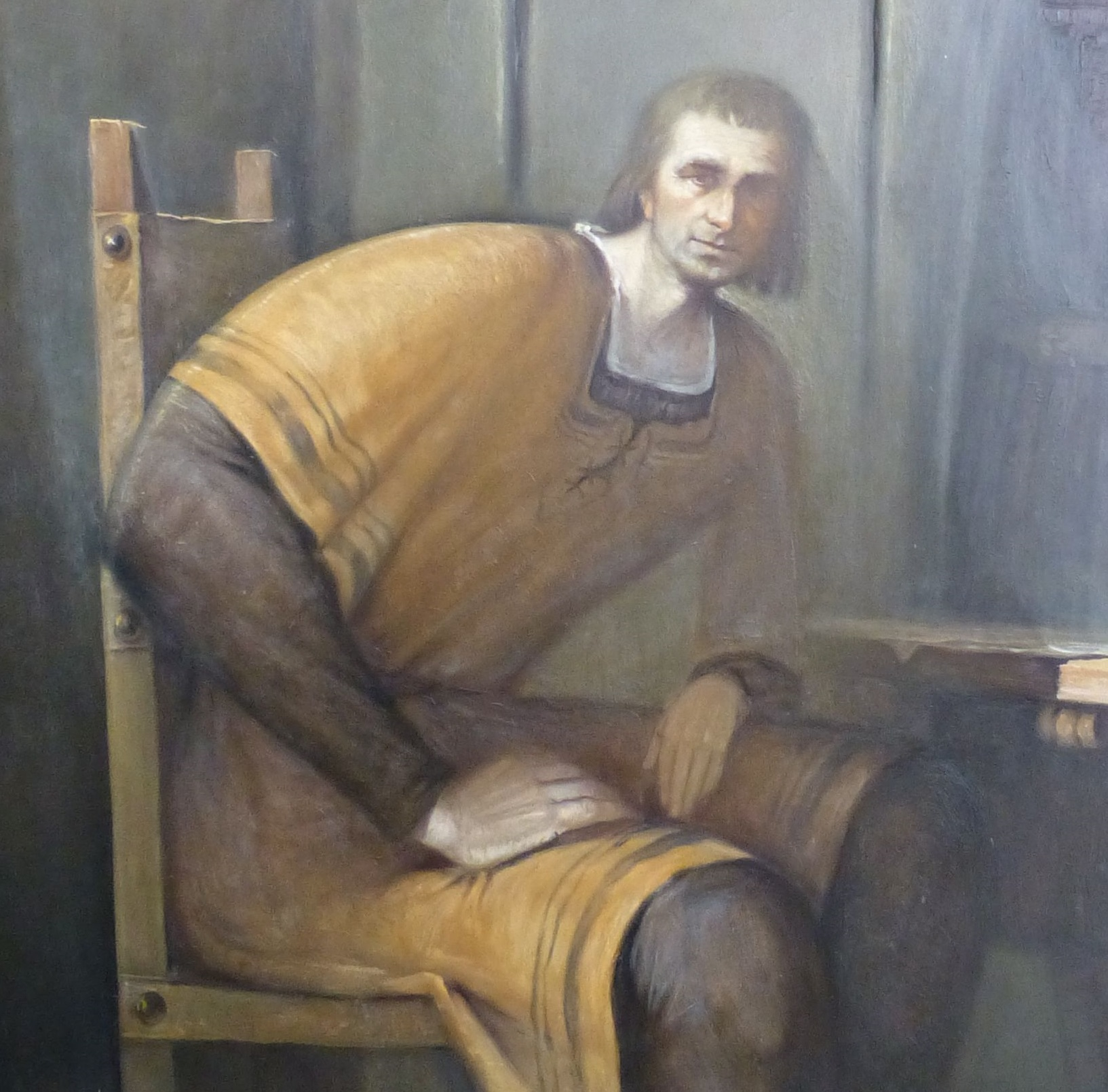
Pedro Alonso Niño

- Juan Niño, the oldest of the brothers, was master and owner of the caravel La Niña on Columbus's first voyage. Upon their return, he accompanied Columbus to Barcelona after staying several days at home in Moguer. He was also on the crew of the second and third voyages of Columbus. With his brother Pedro Alonso he traveled to the Gulf of Paria.
- Pedro Alonso Niño was born in Moguer around 1468. A sailor since his youth, he learned his trade on the coast of Africa. In 1492, on Columbus's first voyage, he was pilot of the Santa María. In 1494 he traveled again with Columbus, but returned rapidly to Spain, as he was in Cádiz on 7 March 1494. Although he was enlisted for the third voyage, in the end he was not able to go. He was given the title of Grand Pilot of the Indies (Piloto Mayor de las Indias) the first such together with Juanoto Berardi, and in 1495 and 1496 captained several ships to the New World. In 1499 he became associated with the merchants Guerra, with whom he made a sea voyage to the Gulf of Paria, where they obtained many pearls, explored a good deal of the coast, variously trading with natives and battling them. He died in 1502, returning to Spain on the Santa María de la Antigua. Contemporary records sometimes refer to him as Peralonso Niño.
- Francisco Niño, the youngest brother, is believed to have been a sailor on Columbus's first voyage, was pilot of La Niña on the second voyage, and pilot of the caravel Santa Cruz on the expedition of Pedro Fernández Coronel. At the time of his death, he was mayor of Puerto de Caballos, now Puerto Cortés, Honduras.

=== Other members of the Niño family ===
- Cristóbal Pérez Niño, master of the caravel Caldera (or Cardera) on Columbus's second voyage, believed to be another brother of the three Niño Brothers.
- Alonso Pérez Niño, son of Juan Niño, traveled on Columbus's second voyage. He died some three decades later in Trinidad, doing battle with the Caribes.
- Bartolomé Pérez Niño, son of Pedro Alonso Niño, was probably Columbus's second voyage, possibly pilot of the caravel San Juan; definitely was on Columbus's third voyage and with Pedro Alonso Niño on the expedition of Cristóbal Guerra to Paria.
- Francisco Niño, son of Pedro Alonso Niño, was the youngest person to travel with Columbus to the East Indies, as a 14-year-old cabin boy on the second voyage. In 1516 he crossed the Atlantic again, as an official on the caravel Sancti Spiritus.
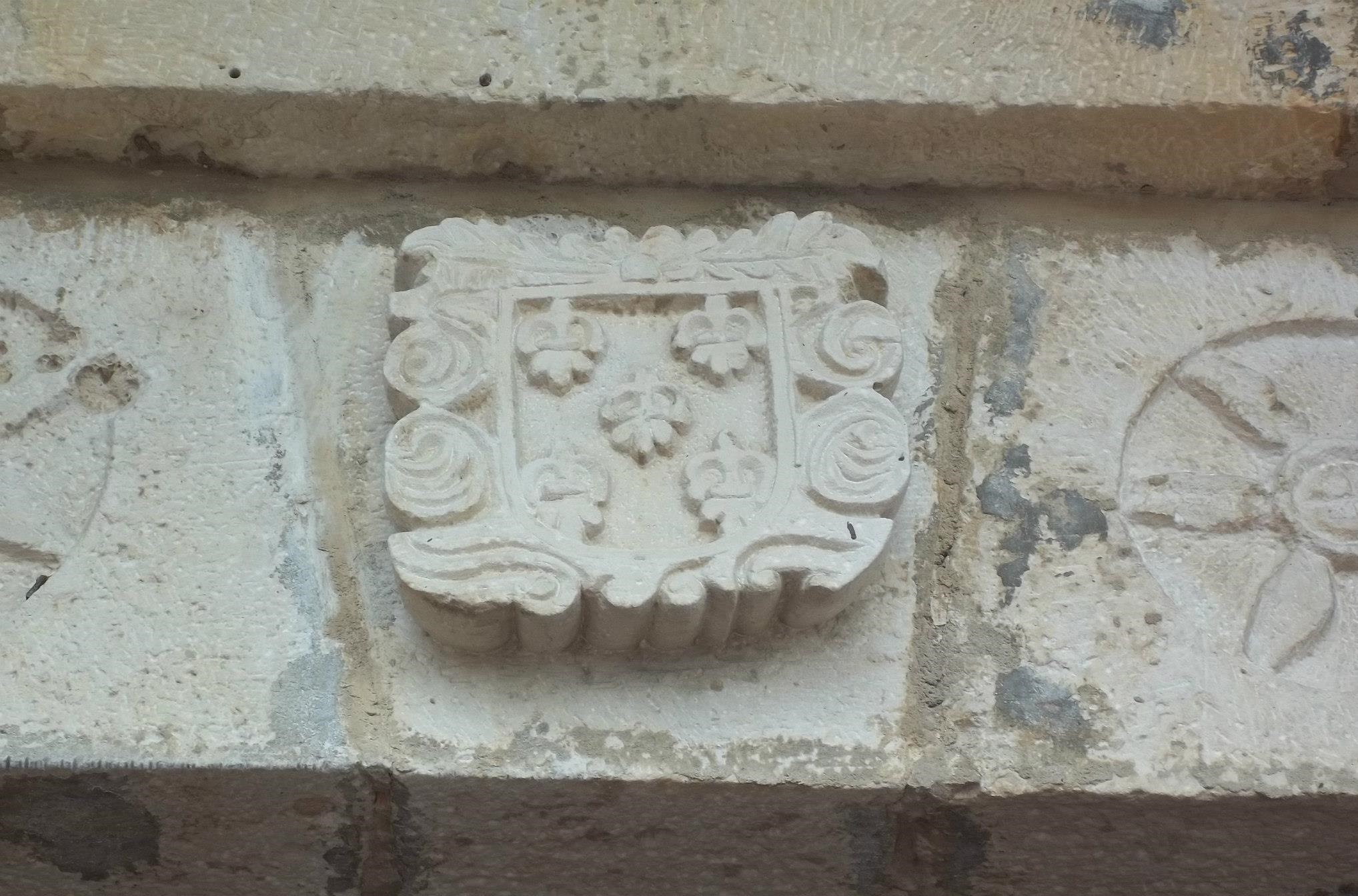
  Detail of the shield in the House of Juan Agustín Niño y Álvarez, in Tunja Colombia. He was ordinary mayor of Tunja (direct descendant of the Niño Brothers of Moguer)
- Pedro Alonso Niño II, son of Francisco Niño and grandson Pedro Alonso Niño. He set out to conquer the Indies, through Bonda, Cubagua, Santa Marta, Vélez, Tunja and Santa Fe. He conquered and settled in the Province of Santa Marta, which is in present-day Colombia. He got married and had both legitimate and natural children. The latter were born out of wedlock with an indigenous woman. This situation accelerated a process of acculturation that over time would become a defining characteristic of the American people. The surname Niño took root in the city of Tunja and has remained unchanged for centuries. Several notable individuals from this line of succession include Francisco Antonio Niño y Santiago, Juan Agustín Niño y Álvarez, who served as the ordinary mayor of Tunja, and his son Juan Nepomuceno Niño, who was a politician in the Viceroyalty of New Granada and later became the governor of the Republic of Tunja.
- Andrés Niño, son of Juan Niño, was named Royal Pilot of the Southern Sea (Piloto Real de la Mar del Sur; the Mar del Sur was the Pacific Ocean, as first encountered by the Spanish in Central America) 12 July 1514 and set sail in 1519 to explore the Pacific coast of Central America before dying in 1525 in what is now El Salvador.

== See also ==
- History of the Americas
- Lugares colombinos
- Christopher Columbus
