= Pedro Alonso Niño =

Spanish explorer

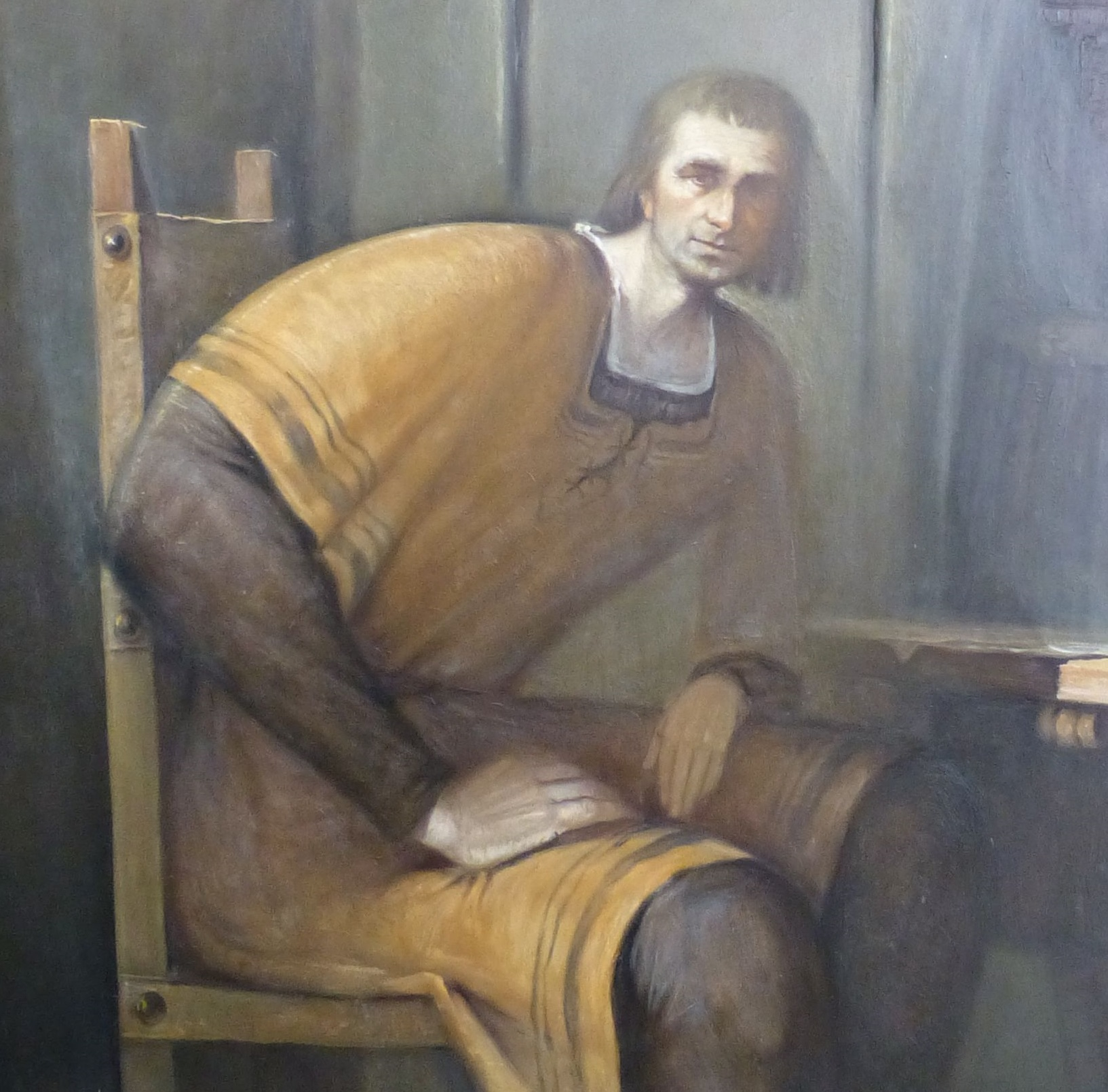
- Painting of Pedro Alonso Niño in the Monasterio de La Rábida
- Born: c. 1455; Moguer, Spain
- Died: c. 1505
- Known for: Explorer

Pedro Alonso Niño (c. 1455 – c. 1505) was known in his time as Peralonso Niño, he was a Spanish navigator and discoverer. He piloted the Santa María during Christopher Columbus's first voyage to the Americas in 1492, and accompanied him on his second voyage in 1493.

== Biography ==
Niño was born in Moguer, Spain. His father was Alfon Perez Niño, a Spanish sailor. Pedro Alonso Niño was married twice, to Juana Muñiz and Leonor de Boria, and sired four children, namely Juan Niño, Francisco Niño, Isabel Quintero and Leonor Fernández. He was nicknamed "El negro" for his involvement in the African slave trade.

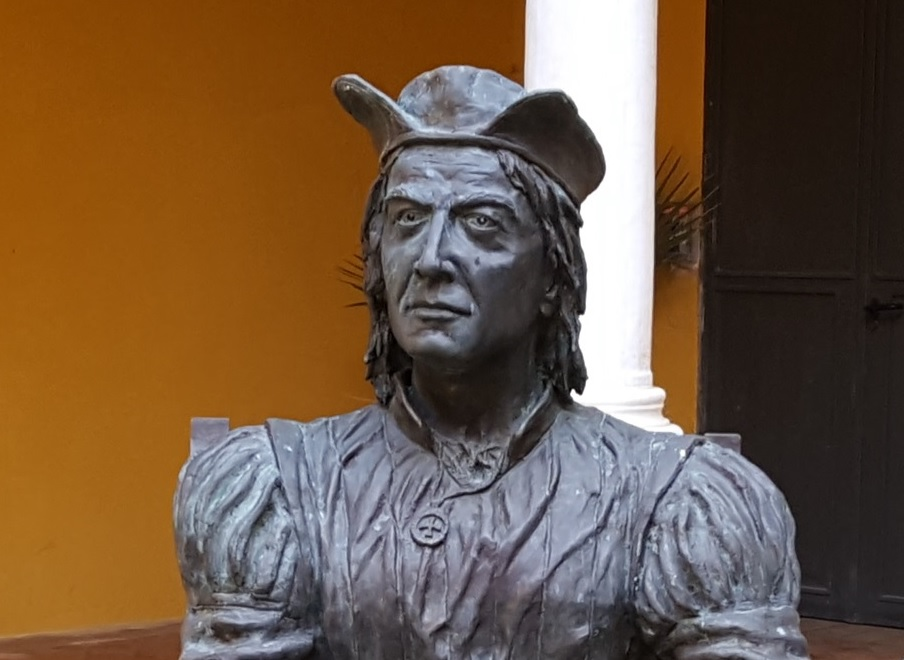
Statue of Pedro Alonso Niño in Moguer, Spain

He explored the west coast of Africa in his early years and many other places. Niño guided Columbus and navigated the Atlantic Ocean as he piloted the Santa María during Christopher Columbus's expedition of 1492, and accompanied him during his third voyage that saw the discovery of Trinidad and the mouths of the Orinoco River. After returning to Spain, Niño made preparations to explore the Indies independently, looking for gold and pearls. Empowered by the Council of Castile to seek out new countries, avoiding those already found by Columbus, he committed to give 20% of his profits to the Spanish Crown (see quinto real).

In the company of brothers Luis and Cristóbal de la Guerra, respectively a rich merchant and a pilot, he left San Lucas in May 1499, and, after twenty-three days, they arrived at Maracapana. Visiting the islands of Isla Margarita, Coche, and Cubagua, they exchanged objects of little value for a large number of pearls before sailing up the coast to Punta Araya, where they discovered salt mines.

After just two months they were back in Baiona, Spain, loaded with wealth. However, they were accused of cheating King Ferdinand II out of his portion of the spoils. Arrested, and with his property confiscated, Niño died before the conclusion of his trial.

=== Death ===
Pedro died around 1505.

== Legacy ==
There is a monument to Pedro Alonso Niño in the Convent of San Francisco in Moguer, Spain. In 1940, Niño was honored with one of the 33 dioramas at the American Negro Exposition in Chicago.

== See also ==
- Niño brothers
