= Martín Alonso Pinzón =

Spanish explorer, oldest of the Pinzón brothers

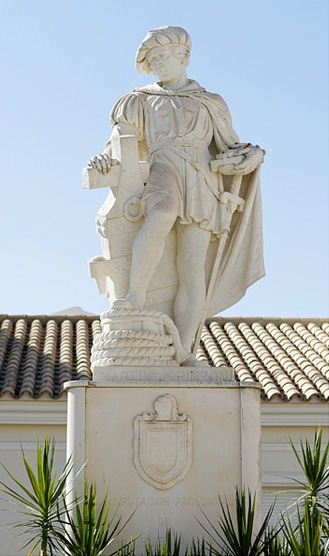
- Statue of Pinzón in Palos de la Frontera
- Born: c. 1441; Palos de la Frontera, Huelva, Andalusia, Spain
- Died: c. 1493; Palos de la Frontera, Huelva, Andalusia, Spain
- Occupations: Mariner, explorer, discoverer
- Years active: ?–1493
- Spouse: María Álvarez
- Children: Sons: Arias Pérez, Juan; Daughters: Mayor, Catalina, Leonor
- Parent(s): Martín Pinzón, Mayor Vicente
- Relatives: Pinzón brothers

Martín Alonso Pinzón, (Spanish pronunciation: [maɾˈtin aˈlonso pinˈθon]; Palos de la Frontera, Huelva; c. 1441 – c. 1493) was a Spanish mariner, shipbuilder, navigator and explorer, oldest of the Pinzón brothers. He sailed with Christopher Columbus on his first voyage to the New World in 1492, as captain of the Pinta. His youngest brother Vicente Yáñez Pinzón was captain of the Niña, and the middle brother Francisco Martín Pinzón was maestre (first mate) of the Pinta.

== The Pinzón family of Palos ==
The Pinzón family was among the leading families of Palos de la Frontera in the late 15th century. There are several conflicting theories about the origin of the family and of their name (see Pinzón family). His grandfather was a sailor and diver known as Martín; it is not clear whether that was a first or last name, and whether in his generation Pinzón was a surname or an epithet. His father was a sailor named Martín Pinzón; his mother was named Mayor Vicente.

== Life ==
Born in Palos around 1441, it appears that at quite a young age Pinzón shipped out on a locally based caravel as a grumete (cabin boy). His home, now the Casa Museo de Martín Alonso Pinzón, was on the old royal road to the Monastery of La Rábida. Martín's family contracted a marriage with a resident of the locality named María Álvarez. They had five children: two boys—Arias Pérez and Juan, who participated in several expeditions to the Americas—and three girls—Mayor, Catalina, and Leonor. Leonor, the youngest, suffered frequent attacks of what was then called "gota coral" and would now be called epilepsy.

A French tradition holds that Alonso Pinzón sailed to the New World with the navigator Jean Cousin, and that together they discovered the continent in 1488, four years before Columbus. Back in Dieppe, Pinzón left Cousin in a dispute, and is claimed to have left for Spain, from where he advised Columbus on his westward sail. Pinzon is known to have displayed a remarkable confidence in guiding Columbus in his discovery of the New World. No indisputable written records remain, however, to support this early claim to discovery.

His nautical experience and his leadership remained patent in the 1508–1536 lawsuits known as the pleitos colombinos ("Columbian lawsuits"), where the witnesses indicated him as the leader of the comarca (a region comparable to a shire). He was also famous for his battles against the Portuguese in the War of the Castilian Succession. It is probable that even while in Portugal before coming to Spain, Columbus was aware of Martín Alonso, because he was known for his participation in the war, as well as for his incursions into the Afro-Atlantic waters in the wake of the Portuguese, traveling to the Canary Islands and Guinea, with their rich fisheries and the commercial possibility of trade in gold, spices, and slaves.

== Preparations for the voyage of discovery ==
On 23 May 1492 a royal provision was read out to the residents of Palos, by which the Catholic Monarchs Isabella and Ferdinand ordered that certain residents deliver two caravels to Columbus and travel with him on his voyage that he was making "by command of Their Highnesses" ("por mandado de Sus Altezas") and that the town should respect the royal decision. The locals did not comply. The sailors of Palos had no confidence in embarking on this adventure with Columbus, who was largely unknown to them. Independent of their greater or lesser credence in his ideas, the men of Palos found it difficult to support the Genovese sailor if he was not accompanied by a mariner known and respected in the town. The venture—risky and, above all, of uncertain profit—did not present great attractions. Opposition or indifference to Columbus's project was general.

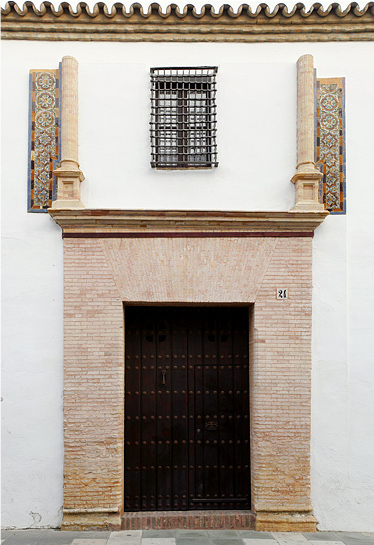
Pinzón family house in Palos, now Casa Museo de Martín Alonso Pinzón.

At about this time, Pinzón returned from a routine commercial voyage to Rome. The Franciscans of the Monastery of La Rábida put Columbus in touch with Pinzón. Pinzón's friend Pero Vázquez de la Frontera, a very respected old mariner in the town, also had an important influence on Pinzón deciding to support the undertaking, not only morally but also economically.

There is no record of any written agreement between Columbus and Pinzón, and the terms of any agreement are lost to history. However, we do have the writings of Fray Bartolomé de las Casas and the testimony of some witnesses. According to Fernández Duro, de las Casas says Columbus offered Pinzón equal honors in the voyage and half the profits, and Diego Pinzón Colmenero testified the same in the pleitos colombinos; Francisco Medel testified that he heard him offer Pinzón "whatever he asked for and desired".

As a strong sign of his commitment to Columbus's plan, Pinzón put up half a million ("medio cuento") maravedís in coin toward the cost of the voyage, half of the amount that had been put up by the monarchy. Thanks to his prestige as a shipowner and expert sailor and his fame throughout the Tinto-Odiel region, he was able to enlist an appropriate crew. Signing on, he dismissed the vessels that Columbus had already seized based on the royal order and also dismissed the men he had enrolled, supplying the enterprise with two caravels of his own, the Pinta and the Niña, which he knew from his own experience would be better and more suitable boats. Furthermore, he traveled through Palos, Moguer and Huelva, convincing his relatives and friends to enlist, composing of them the best crew possible. According to testimony in the pleitos colombinos, he "brought such diligence to secure and animate the people as if what were discovered were for him and his sons." Among those he recruited were Cristóbal Quintero from Palos and the Niño brothers from Moguer.

At this time, Pinzón and Columbus seemed quite close. In the pleitos colombinos, witness Alonso Gallego from Huelva remembered hearing Columbus say, "Mister Martín Alonso Pinzón, we are going on this voyage which, if we go on with it and God reveals new lands to us, I promise by the Royal Crown to treat you as a brother."

== Voyage with Columbus ==
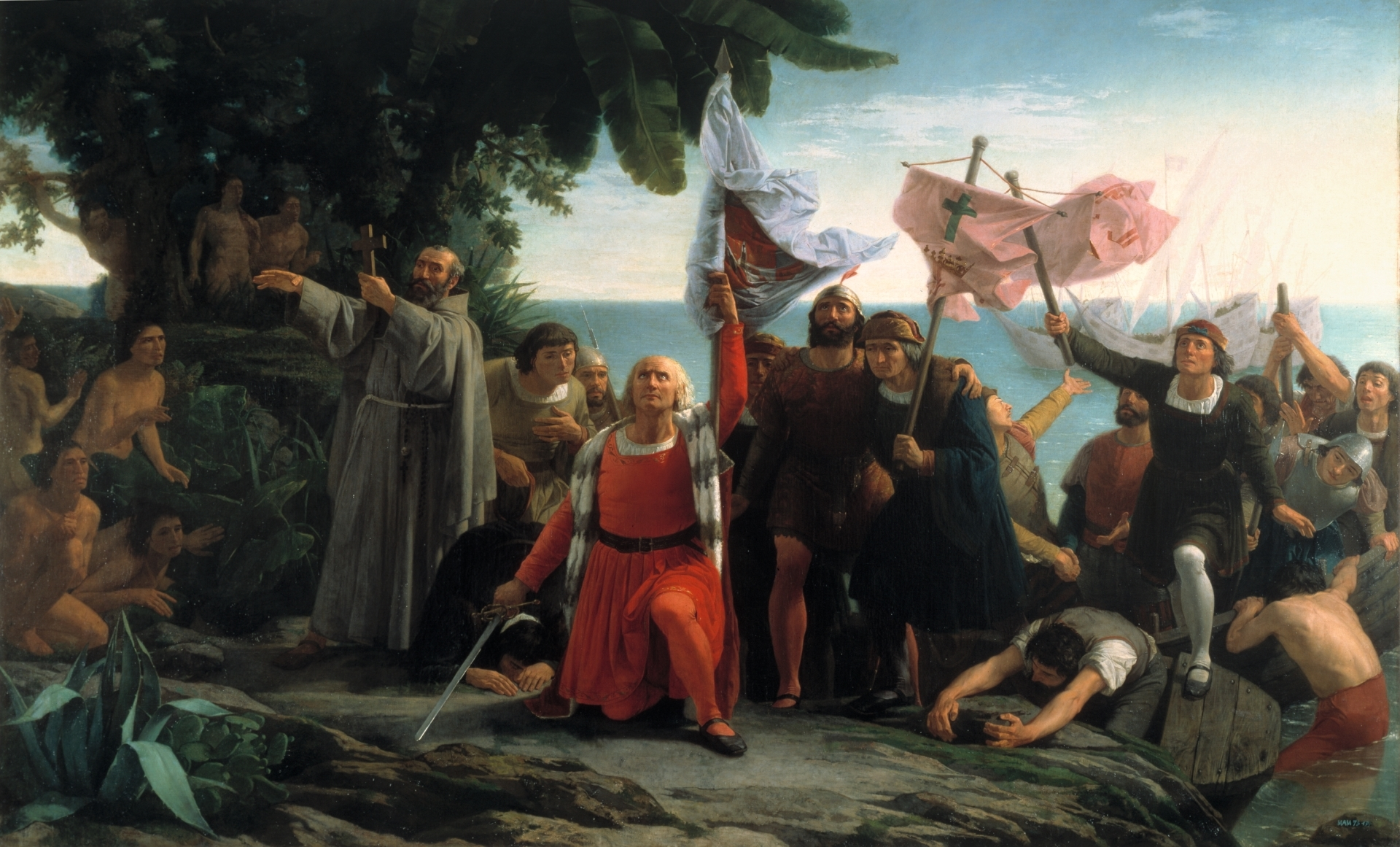
Columbus and the Pinzón brothers arrive in America, by Dióscoro Puebla (1862)

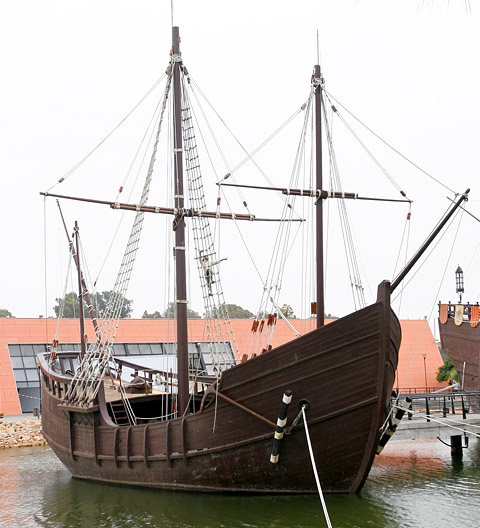
Replica of the caravel Pinta at the Wharf of the Caravels in Palos.

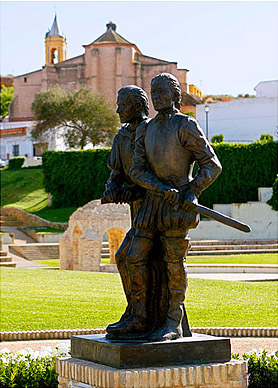
Statue of the Pinzón brothers in Palos.

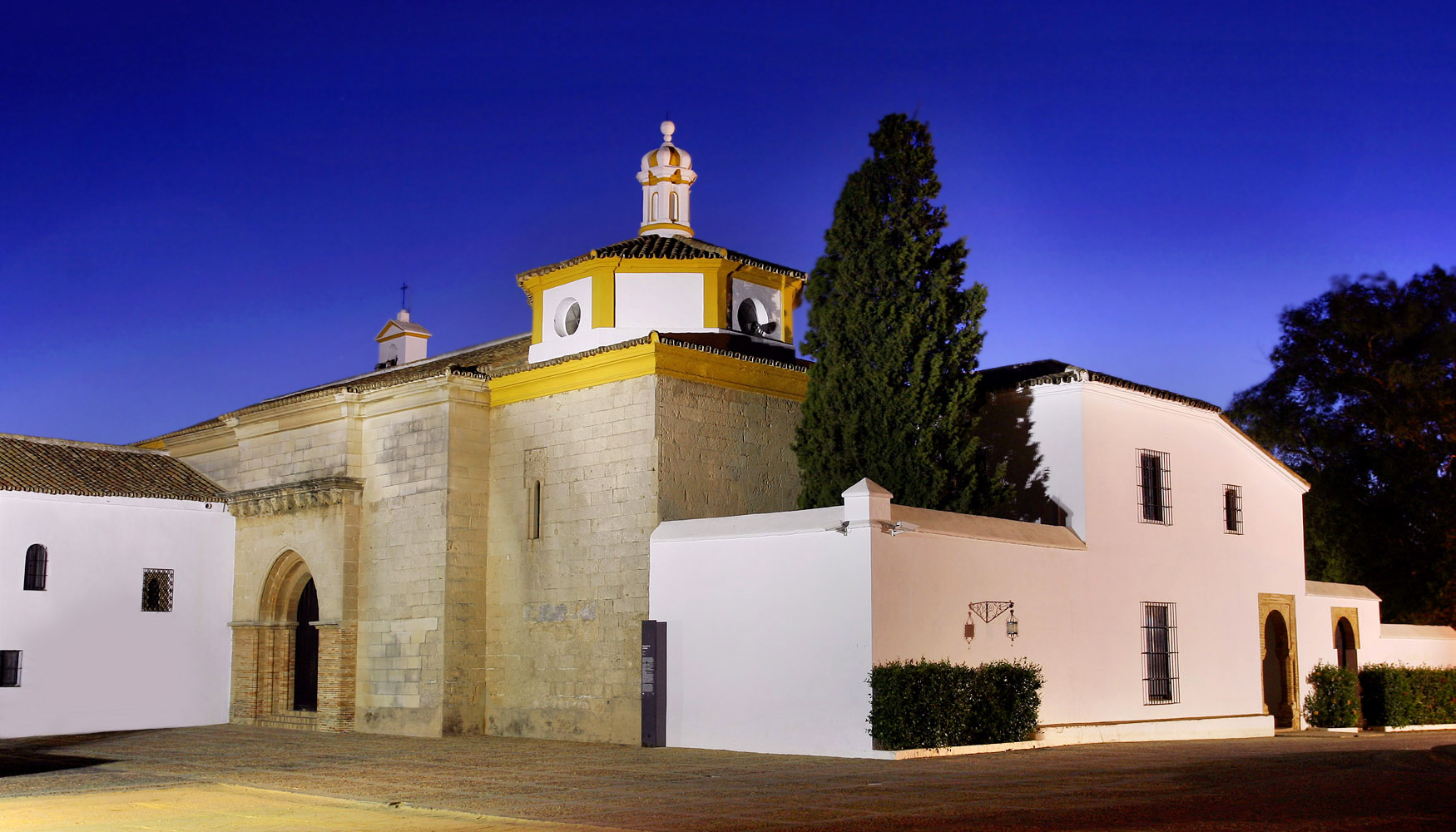
Monastery of La Rábida.

=== The voyage out ===
On 3 August 1492, the Santa María, Pinta, and Niña left Palos on their voyage of discovery. Admiral Columbus captained the flagship Santa María, Pinzón was captain of the Pinta; his middle brother Francisco was master. It was from the Pinta that Rodrigo de Triana would be the first to sight land in the Americas.

During the voyage, Pinzón demonstrated on several occasions his gifts as an expert mariner and as a leader. When the tiller of the Pinta broke en route to the Canary Islands, Columbus, who could not get close enough to help from the Santa María:

...was a bit less worried knowing that Martín Alonso Pinzón was a vigorous and ingenious person. ...he resolved the problem of the broken tiller of the Pinta and was able to continue sailing.

When, between 6 and 7 October 1492 Columbus was unable to reestablish discipline among the tired and discouraged crew of the Santa María, Martín Alonso with his gift of command managed to resolve the situation. As the Hernán Pérez Mateos would testify over forty years later:

... as they did not discover land, those who went with the said Columbus wanted to mutiny and rise against him, saying they were lost, and then the said Columbus had said to Martín Alonso what was going on among these people, and what it seemed to him they ought to do; and that the said Martín Alonso Pinzón had responded to him; «Sir; hang half a dozen of them and throw them into the sea, and if you dare not, I and my brothers will get up close to them and do it, that an armada that left with the mandate of such high princes not have to return without good news.» And that he knew that with that they would regain their spirits; and the said Columbus had said; «Martin Alonso; lets make things good with these gentlemen and travel another eight days, and if in that time we don't find land, we will give another order on what we ought to do.» ...

At that time, Pinzón suggested to Columbus the change of course on 6 October 1492. This change brought the expedition to landfall on Guanahani on 12 October 1492.

These and other acts by Pinzón and by his brothers, especially Vicente, have led historians to see the brothers as "co-discoverers of America", in that without their help, support, and courage, Columbus probably could not have achieved his enterprise of discovery, at least not in that time and place. At one point during the pleitos colombinos, a royal prosecutor argued that Pinzón had played a more important role in the discovery of the Indies than Columbus himself.

=== Separation in the Caribbean ===
All evidence—the remarks in Columbus's diary, the testimony in the pleitos colombinos—is that on the outward voyage, relations between Columbus and Pinzón remained positive. Once among the Caribbean islands, that began to change.

On 21 November 1492, off the coast of Cuba, Pinzón failed to follow a direct order of Columbus to change course. He probably sailed off on his own trying to make individual discoveries and to find treasure, although Cesáreo Fernández Duro argues that the initial separation may have been accidental, a matter of missed signals. (Asensio takes Fernández Duro strongly to task for not adequately explaining the length of the separation; Fernández Duro responds that Pinzón simply continued the prior course, and if Columbus wanted, he should have had a pretty fair idea where to find him over the next several days.) During his separate travels he discovered new land; while all of the island geography of the first voyage is open to question, it is believed that the land was Haiti.

19th-century historian José María Asensio, at least, blamed Pinzón's absence for the fact that on 25 December, the Santa María was wrecked on a shoal; Pinzón's brother Vicente in command of the Niña played a key part in rescuing the sailors and Columbus himself. Columbus, giving up on Pinzón, began sailing homeward 4 January, leaving behind 38 men, all of whom died before Columbus's return nine months later. The Niña and Pinta sighted and rejoined one another 6 January 1493, and, after a furious argument in which according to at least one witness, Pinzón objected to the 38 men being "left so far from Spain, being so few, because they could not be provided for and would be lost", and Columbus threatened to hang Pinzón, the two ships headed together back toward Spain on 8 January.

Columbus's published diary of the voyage was heavily edited by Bartolomé de las Casas, so it is impossible to know what was actually written at the time and what was added later, but the diary launches a series of accusations against Pinzón beginning with his separation on November 21:

Wednesday, 21 November [1492]
...This day Martín Alonso Pinzón departed with the caravel Pinta, without the obedience and will of the Admiral, out of greed, he says that an Indian that the Admiral had ordered to be put in that caravel had told him where to get much gold [the Spanish here, le había de dar mucho oro, is a bit obscure, but this seems to be the sense], and so he went away without waiting, without cause of bad weather, just because he wanted to. And here the Admiral says: «He did and said many other [things] to me».

Tuesday, 8 January [1493]
With such strong winds from the east and southeast he did not leave that day, because of which he ordered that that caravel be supplied with water and firewood and all that was necessary for the entire voyage, because although he intended to travel by ship along that whole Hispaniola coast as far as he could, but, because those he put in the caravels for commanders were brothers, to wit Martín Alonso Pinzón and Vicente Yáñez, and others who followed him with arrogance and greed estimating that everything was already theirs, not looking at the honor the Admiral had given them, they had not obeyed and did not obey his commands, before they had said and done many unmerited things against him, and this Martín Alonso left him from 21 November until 6 January without any cause or reason except disobedience, all of which the Admiral had suffered and been silent to bring a good end to his voyage, so that, to leave behind such bad company, with whom he says that it was necessary to dissimulate, although they were lawless people, and though he had to say while with them that they were good men*, because it was not the time to speak of punishment, he agreed to return and stop no more, as quickly as was possible ...

* An effort to make sense of a rather obscure phrase, "y aunque tenía dice que consigo muchos hombres de bien"; possibly alternatively "and though he had to say that they had many good men with them".

Nonetheless, much of the testimony in the pleitos colombinos, as well as part of the specialized historiography and investigators, does not agree that these things happened in this manner, nor is there any accusation against Pinzón in Columbus's Letter on the First Voyage, which Columbus wrote during his return.

=== Return voyage and death ===
During the voyage back to Spain, Pinzón's ship was separated from Columbus in stormy conditions, southwest of the Azores. Pinzón arrived in Baiona in Galicia, near Vigo, 1 March 1493; Columbus reached Lisbon on March 4; he later faced problems with the Court for having touched down in Portugal out of necessity in bad weather. Pinzón, despite the bad weather and strong southerly winds, had managed to touch down on Spanish territory, not Portuguese. Believing Columbus to be lost, or trying to overcome him, he sent a letter to the King and Queen; some have argued that he claimed the glory of the great discoveries for himself, while others defend him from the charge; the letter itself is lost. In any case, he was snubbed by the court and told to only come under the command of Columbus. It is not clear whether Pinzón's letter or Columbus's from Lisbon reached court first, nor is it clear whether the failure to invite Pinzón to court resulted from Columbus's primacy of position, possible accusations by Columbus against Pinzón, or simply reports of Pinzón's illness and death.

Pinzón returned home to Palos, arriving on 15 March 1493, precisely the same day the Niña reached the voyage's starting point. Exhausted and suffering from a recurrent fever, he was taken from his ship in a stretcher. As Columbus arrived, his friends took him to a farm on the boundary between Palos and Moguer. It is possible that Martín's son, Arias Pérez Pinzón, did not bring him directly to his house in Palos in order to protect him, given that Columbus had threatened him earlier. Another possibility is that this was because Martín did not get along well with Catalina Alonso, the woman who had been living with his father since he became a widower, and with whom the father would have two illegitimate children: Francisco and Inés Pinzón. According to the testimony of Francisco Medel and Hernán Pérez Mateos, he was brought to the La Rábida Monastery, where he died; he was entombed there, as was his wish.

It has been claimed that Pinzón's recurring fever was syphilis. The theory that syphilis is of New World origin and that it was first brought back to Europe by Columbus's crew has been longstanding, and long controversial. Some recent genetic evidence restores credence to the theory. Even so, even if Pinzón contracted it on the voyage, it is extremely unlikely that it was the cause of his death. Tertiary syphilis does not normally show up for 3 to 15 years. There is also a possibility that some historians have confused Martín Alonso Pinzón with his brother Francisco, who is more plausibly (but still controversially) believed to have had this particular disease. Conversely, there is the possibility that the first outbreak of syphilis among Europeans with no immunity was much more virulent than subsequently.

Fernández Duro further writes that Pinzón's "unpardonable crime" was that he had the luck or skill to obtain more gold than Columbus.

== Legacy ==
Along with his brother, Martín Alonso Pínzon is the namesake of Pinzón Island in the Galápagos. He was portrayed by Tchéky Karyo in 1492: Conquest of Paradise and by Robert Davi in Christopher Columbus: The Discovery, both released in 1992.

== Sources ==
- Álvarez de Toledo, Luisa Isabel (2000), Africa versus América, la fuerza del paradigma (in Spanish), Junta Islámica. Centro de Documentación y Publicaciones, ISBN 978-84-607-1135-3, archived from the original on 2009-12-15
- Arranz Márquez, Luis (2006), Cristóbal Colón: misterio y grandeza, Marcial Pons Historia, ISBN 978-84-96467-23-1
- Asensio, José María (1892), Martín Alonso Pinzón: estudio histórico, La España Moderna Online at archive.org.
- Fernández Duro, Cesáreo (1892), Pinzón en el descubrimiento de las Indias (in Spanish), Madrid: Sucesores de Rivadeneyra
- Gould, Alice B. (1984), Nueva lista documentada de los tripulantes de Colón en 1492 (in Spanish), Real Academia de la Historia., ISBN 978-84-600-3829-0 The link is to an abridged copy on Google Books.
- Íñiguez Sánchez-Arjona, Benito (1991), Martín Alonso Pinzón, el calumniado, Seville: Haro, ISBN 978-84-604-1012-6
- Manzano Manzano, Juan; Manzano Fernández-Heredia, Ana Maria (1988), Los Pinzones y el Descubrimiento de América, Ediciones de Cultura Hispánica, ISBN 978-84-7232-442-8
- Ortega, Ángel (1980) [1925], La Rábida. Historia documental crítica. 4 vol. (in Spanish) (facsimile ed.), Diputación Provincial de Huelva. Servicio de Publicaciones, ISBN 978-84-500-3860-6
- Rivera, Carlos (1945), Martín Alonso Pinzón, Ayamonte (Huelva): Imprenta Asilo Provincial
