= San Juan del Puerto, Spain =

Coordinates: 37°19′N 6°50′W

San Juan del Puerto
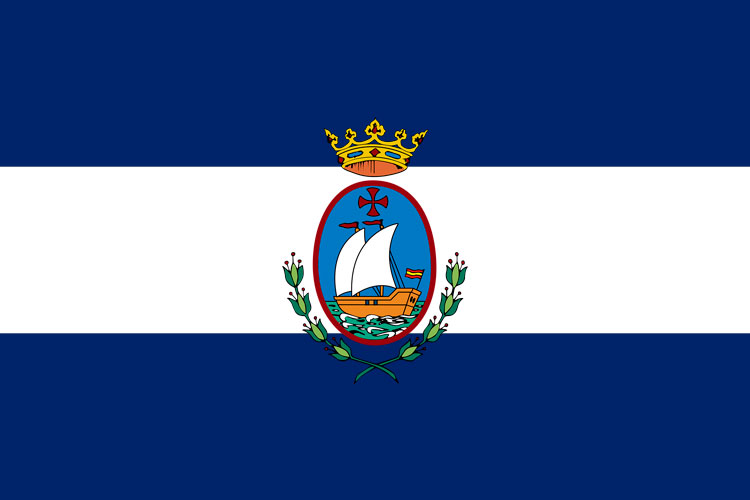
- Flag Coat of arms

- Location in Spain.
- Country: Spain
- Autonomous community: Andalusia
- Province: Huelva

Area
  - Total: 45 km^{2} (17 sq mi)
- Elevation: 10 m (33 ft)

Population (2025-01-01)
  - Total: 9,969
  - Density: 220/km^{2} (570/sq mi)
- Time zone: UTC+1 (CET)
  - Summer (DST): UTC+2 (CEST)
- Website: http://www.sanjuandelpuerto.es/

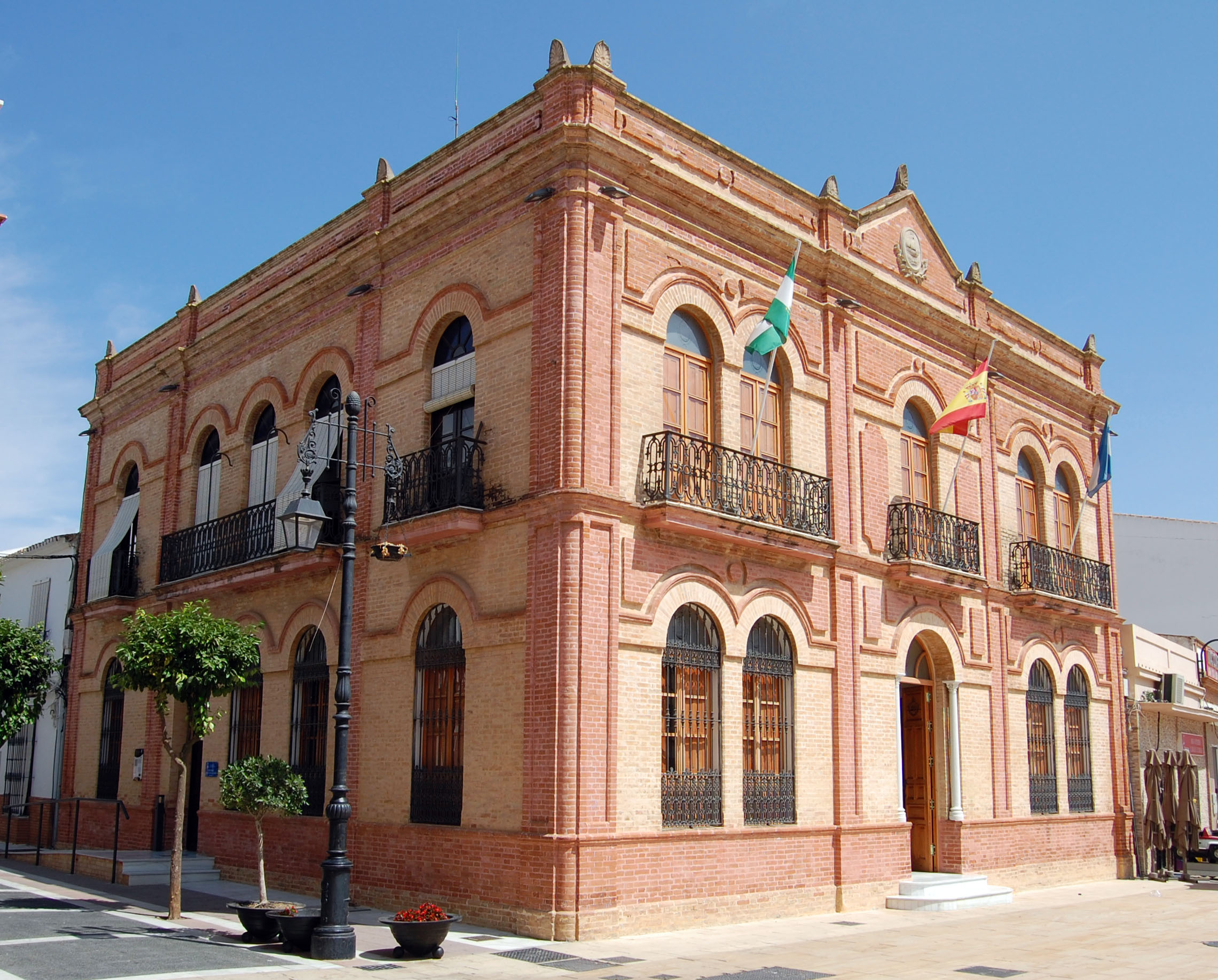
Facade of San Juan del Puerto town hall

San Juan del Puerto, Spain is a municipality located in the province of Huelva, Spain. In 2005 it had a population of 6,881.

== See also ==
- List of municipalities in Huelva
