= Palos de la Frontera =

Town and municipality in Spanish province Huelva

Palos de la Frontera, Spain
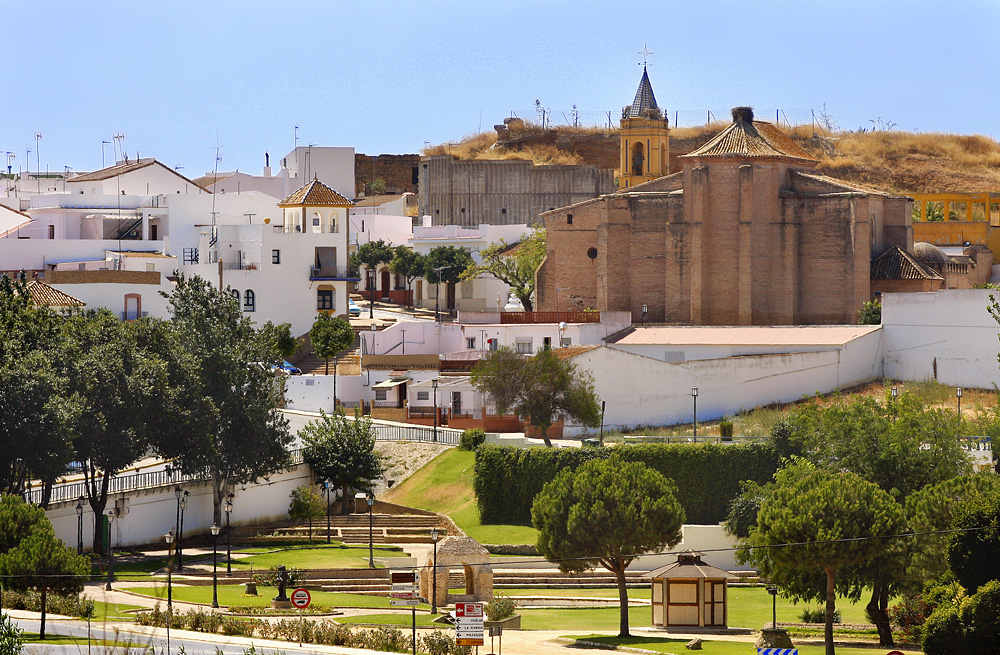
- Panoramic view of downtown Palos de la Frontera

- Flag Coat of arms

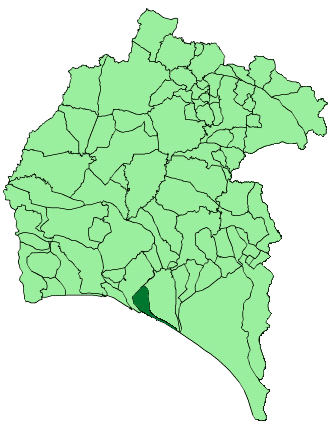
- Location of Palos de la Frontera
- Coordinates: 37°13′42″N 6°53′40″W
- Country: Spain
- Autonomous community: Andalusia
- Province: Huelva

Area
  - Total: 50 km^{2} (19 sq mi)
  - Land: 50 km^{2} (19 sq mi)
  - Water: 0.00 km^{2} (0 sq mi)

Population (2025-01-01)
  - Total: 12,938
  - Density: 260/km^{2} (670/sq mi)
- Demonym(s): palermos (m.), palermas (f.)
- Time zone: UTC+1 (CET)
  - Summer (DST): UTC+2 (CEST)
- Website: www.palosfrontera.com

Palos de la Frontera (Spanish pronunciation: [ˈpalos ðe la fɾonˈteɾa]) is a town and municipality located in the southwestern Spanish province of Huelva, in the autonomous community of Andalusia. It is situated some 13 km (8 mi) from the provincial capital, Huelva. According to the 2025 municipal register, the city had a population of 12,938. It is most famous for being the place from which Columbus set sail in 1492, eventually reaching the Americas.

== History ==
The official date of foundation for Palos is 1322, when the town was granted to Alonso Carro and Carro's wife Berenguela Gómez by Alfonso XI of Castile, although the town may have been occupied during earlier centuries by Paleolithic, Tartessian, Roman, Visigothic, and Muslim inhabitants. Palos's name is derived from the Latin word palus (“lagoon”). It acquired its “surname” as Palos de la Frontera in May 1642.

At the time of its establishment as a town by Alfonso XI, Palos was part of the Almohad kingdom of Niebla, and was a small nucleus whose population subsisted on fishing and took advantage of the area's geographic protection against pirates and storms.

Álvar Pérez is considered the city's real founder. He was only fourteen when Juan I of Castile granted him the towns of Palos and Villalba del Alcor in 1379 to make up for the fact that Pérez de Guzmán was forced to give up Huelva and Gibraleón, which had become part of the county of Medinaceli. Álvar Pérez de Guzmán received from Juan I the right to tax the first fifty families who settled at Palos, and he began utilizing the lands around Palos for the cultivation of olive trees and production of olive oil. After the death of Álvar Pérez de Guzmán, his widow, Elvira de Ayala, daughter of the Chancellor of Castile, continued her husband's work until her death in 1434.

Palos's Golden Age is considered to have occurred in the 15th century (especially between 1470 and 1479), when it increased its population to 2,500 inhabitants and its economy, based on fishing and seafaring expeditions to Guinea, flourished. Palos took advantage of the War of the Castilian Succession, which became a war between Castile and Portugal, to challenge Portuguese domination of the Atlantic trade. Castilian naval forces always included natives of Palos, who were considered navigational experts:

...because only the men of Palos know the ancient sea of Guinea, and were used to fighting the Portuguese from the outset of the war, and to snatch from them the slaves acquired in exchange for vile goods

— Alfonso de Palencia, Crónica de Enrique IV

Nevertheless, the war ended in defeat for the Castilian forces, and Ferdinand and Isabella, in the Treaty of Alcáçovas (1479) gave up all rights to Atlantic and African lands and seas, with the exception of the Canary Islands, which remained Castilian. Many natives of Palos nevertheless violated the agreement and encroached upon Portuguese sea routes in the Atlantic.

On August 3, 1492, the Pinta, Niña, and Santa María sailed from Palos. On board were the Spanish crew of Christopher Columbus and the Pinzón Brothers, who were natives of Palos. Palos is also the site of the Rábida Monastery where Columbus consulted with the Franciscans about his plans for organizing an expedition of discovery. The three Spanish ships landed in America on October 12, 1492. The Santa María foundered in American waters, but the other two ships returned to Palos on March 15, 1493.

Palos would play a pivotal role in the settlement and Christianization of the New World in succeeding centuries. La Rábida would play a central part in the Christian evangelization of the Americas. As La Rábida was a Franciscan monastery, that order would play a dominant role in this Christianization, and some of the first missionaries were natives of Palos, including Juan Izquierdo, Juan de Palos, Juan Cerrado, Pedro Salvador, Alonso Vélez de Guevara, Juan Quintero, Thomás de Narváez, and Francisco Camacho.

With the establishment of the Casa de Contratación at Seville in 1503, Palos suffered a decline. Natives of Palos emigrated to America or to Seville, and Palos soon had few sailing vessels of its own. By the 18th century, the town had only about 125 inhabitants. However, during the same century, Catalan investors established a viticultural industry centered at Palos, and the population slowly reached its pre-1492 levels. Palos also transformed itself into a center of the shrimp industries, and also became a center for the cultivation of the “fresón de Palos” (Palos-grown garden strawberries), which are now exported to the European Union.

On January 22, 1926, the first hydroplane to cross the Atlantic, the Plus Ultra flying boat, took off from Palos. The journey, done in six stages, ended at Buenos Aires, Argentina. Alfonso XIII of Spain gave the Plus Ultra to the Argentine Navy, in which it served as a postal service airplane; the Argentines donated to Spain a statue of Icarus, which is situated at La Rábida. Alfonso XIII also granted to Palos the status as a city during this time.

John Paul II visited Palos on June 14, 1993, the only time a pope has visited the city. John Paul symbolically crowned the Palos's patron saint, the Virgin of Miracles (Virgen de los Milagros).

There is a station in the Madrid Metro named after this town.

In 1850 the small town of Trenton, Illinois, located southwest of Chicago, changed its name to Palos. This recommendation was made by M. S. Powell, the local postmaster, whose ancestor Pedro Alonso Niño sailed with Christopher Columbus from Palos de la Frontera. When it incorporated as a Village in 1914, Palos officially became Palos Park. The neighboring communities of Palos Hills and Palos Heights incorporated at later points. All three municipalities lie within Palos Township.

== Sister Cities ==
- Cali, Colombia
- Latina, Italy
- Lagos, Portugal

== See also ==
- Lugares colombinos
- Christopher Columbus
- Voyages of Christopher Columbus
- The Pinzon Brothers
- Monument to the Discoverers
- List of municipalities in Huelva
