= Anton Birlinger =

German Catholic theologian and Germanist

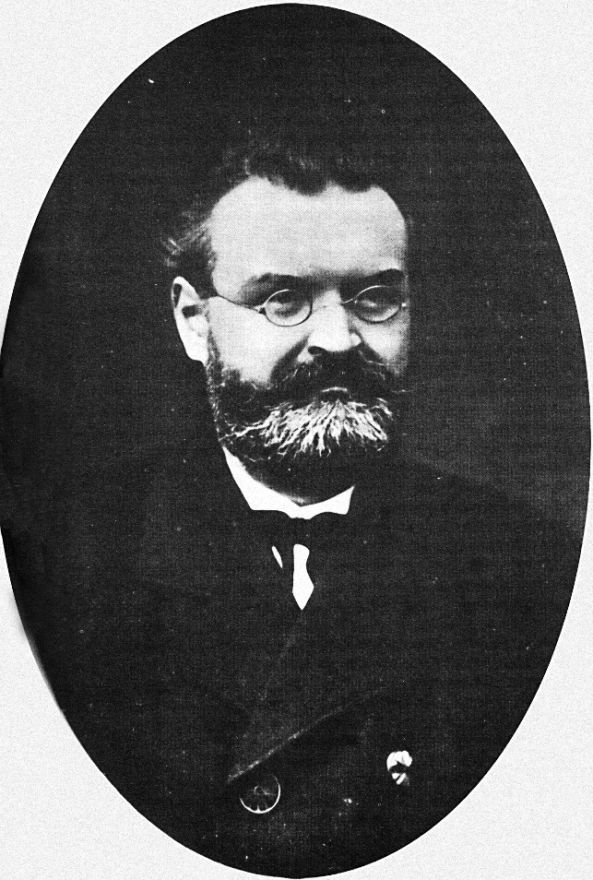
Anton Birlinger

Anton Birlinger (14 January 1834 in Wurmlingen near Rottenburg am Neckar – 15 June 1891 in Bonn) was a German Catholic theologian and Germanist.

== Life and work ==
Birlinger studied Catholic theology and German studies at the University of Tübingen from 1854 to 1858. He then went to the Rottenburg Seminary and was ordained there in 1859. In 1861 he went to Munich, in particular to continue his German studies with Alois Josef Vollmer (1803–1876). He immediately made a name for himself with a collection of idioms and sagas, but also through his own literary experiments, finally as the editor of folklore works and dialect dictionaries. In addition, in Munich he came even more under the influence of an enlightened theology with a scientific basis and with a willingness to contradict dogmas coming from Rome (Ignaz von Döllinger, Johann Nepomuk Huber, Johann Friedrich, Jakob Frohschammer and Joseph Anton Messmer).

Shortly after the lost war against Prussia, Birlinger went from Munich to the University of Breslau, to which anti-infallible professors of theology had been appointed and which was considered a center of criticism of Roman Catholicism (anti-ultramontanism), especially of Johann Anton Theiner (1799–1860) and the later Old Catholics Joseph Hubert Reinkens and Johann Baptist Baltzer. University and religious-political questions were now posed differently: between radical German Catholic demands for democracy and religious freedom and the Sailerian theology of a prince-bishop full of mystical flower beds (Melchior von Diepenbrock), these professors' rebellion was about not tolerating any curtailment of academic freedom.

Birlinger turned to the doyen of proverb research on a scientific basis, Karl Simrock, at the University of Bonn. On his recommendation he became habilitated in Bonn in 1869 - and in 1872 he became an extraordinary professor for German philology there.

Together with Simrock and Franz Peter Knoodt he campaigned for a reform of the Catholic Church. He supported the Bonn theology professors Franz Heinrich Reusch and Joseph Langen, who broke away from their faculty under the protection of the government, and as a priest he participated in the development of anti-Vatican resistance and an "Old Catholic" movement. In 1870, as a supporter of the Old Catholic movement, he was suspended from the Roman Catholic priesthood. On 4 June 1873, he stood alongside 29 other candidates as a bishop candidate before an electoral body of 55 lay people and 22 priests for the Old Catholic Church that was to be newly constituted. His Breslau colleague Joseph Hubert Reinkens was elected, who then also came to Bonn, which formed the new bishopric. After the further development of the church, however, Birlinger withdrew from the priestly ministry in the Old Catholic Church, although not because of its abolition of celibacy like Reusch and Langen. Birlinger's return to Rome on his deathbed, as reported by August Franzen, is probably only legendary.

Birlinger's work was devoted to language and symbol criticism and maintenance, cultural history, medical history (in 1882 he edited the Alemannia the so-called Alsatian pharmacopoeia (Strasbourg, around 1400), a compilation of previously known recipes and contents from medical tracts, such as the Arzneibuch of Ortolf von Baierland), local history, but also the research of superstition as a precursor of empirical theology.

In Berlin-Spandau, he is commemorated by a road named after him, the Birlingerweg.

== Literature ==
=== Early Reception ===
- Max Kopp: Der Altkatholizismus in Deutschland, 1871–1912. ikz 1912/1913, "Kempten: Verlag des Reichsverbandes alt.kath. Jungmannschaften", 1913 (via name index)

=== Biographical overviews ===
- Otto Schell (1903). "Birlinger, Anton" . Allgemeine Deutsche Biographie (in German). Vol. 47. Leipzig: Duncker & Humblot. pp. 759–760.
- Rudolf Kapff (1955). "Birlinger, Anton". Neue Deutsche Biographie (in German). Vol. 2. Berlin: Duncker & Humblot. pp. 258–259. (full text online).

=== More recent publications ===
- Rudolf Schenda: Anton Birlinger 1834–1891. In: Hermann Bausinger (ed.): Zur Geschichte von Volkskunde und Mundartforschung in Württemberg. Tübingen, 1964, pp. 138–158
- Ursula Lewald, Rudolf Schenda: Leben und Briefe des Bonner Germanisten Anton Birlinger. In: Rheinische Vierteljahrsblätter 32/1968, pp. 419–429
- August Franzen: Die Katholisch-Theologische Fakultät Bonn im Streit um das Erste Vatikanische Konzil. Zugleich ein Beitrag zur Entstehungsgeschichte des Altkatholizismus am Niederrhein. Böhlau, Cologne, 1974
- Anton Birlinger [junior]: Der schwäbische Brauchtumsforscher Anton Birlinger. Knirsch, Kirchentellinsfurt 1993 (with bibliography)
