= Jean-Frédéric =

Jean-Frédéric or Jean-Frederic is a given name. Notable people with the name include:

- Jean Frederic Bazille (1841–1870), French Impressionist painter
- Jean-Frédéric Chapuis (born 1989), French freestyle skier
- Jean Frédéric Auguste Delsarte (1903–1968), French mathematician
- Jean-Frédéric Edelmann (1749–1794), French classical composer
- Jean Frédéric Frenet (1816–1900), French mathematician, astronomer, and meteorologist
- Louis-Jean-Frédéric Guyot (1905–1988), cardinal of the Catholic Church, archbishop of Toulouse
- Jean-Frédéric Hermann (1768–1793), French physician and naturalist mainly interested in entomology
- Joliot-Curie, Irene and Jean-Frederic (1900–1958), French physicist and husband of Irène Joliot-Curie
- Jean-Frédéric Phélypeaux, Count of Maurepas (1701–1781), French statesman and Count of Maurepas
- Jean-Frédéric Morency (born 1989), French basketball player
- Jean-Frédéric Neuburger (born 1986), French pianist, organist, and composer
- Jean Frederic Poupart de Neuflize CVO (1850–1928), French banker and equestrian
- Jean Frederic Oberlin (1740–1826), Alsatian pastor and philanthropist
- Jean-Frédéric Osterwald (1663–1747), Protestant pastor from Neuchâtel (now in Switzerland)
- Jean-Frédéric Émile Oustalet (1844–1905), French zoologist
- Jean-Frédéric Perregaux (1744–1808), banker from Neuchâtel (now in Switzerland)
- Jean-Frédéric de la Tour du Pin-Gouvernet, (1727–1794), Comte de Paulin, French nobleman, general and politician
- Jean-Frédéric Poisson (born 1963), French right-wing politician and the president of VIA
- Jean-Frédéric Schall (1752–1825), French painter who specialized in genre scenes and portraits
- Jean-Frédéric de Turckheim (1780–1850), French politician
- Jean-Frédéric Waldeck (1766–1875), French antiquarian, cartographer, artist and explorer

== See also ==
- Refuge Jean-Frédéric Benevolo, refuge in the Alps in Aosta Valley, Italy
- Jane Frederick
- Jean Fredericks
- Jennia Fredrique
- John Frederiksen
- John Fredriksen
- John Fredriksson
- John Friedrich (disambiguation)
