= Johann Friedrich =

Johann Friedrich or Joh(an)n Frederick may refer to:

- Johann Friedrich (theologian)
- Johann Friedrich, Duke of Pomerania
- Johann Frederick, Duke of Württemberg
- John Frederick I, Elector of Saxony, called Johann Friedrich

== See also ==
- Johannes Friedrich (disambiguation)
