= Paul Melchers =

Catholic cardinal (1813–1895)

His Eminence Paul Ludolf Melchers S.J.
- Cardinal, Archbishop emeritus of Cologne
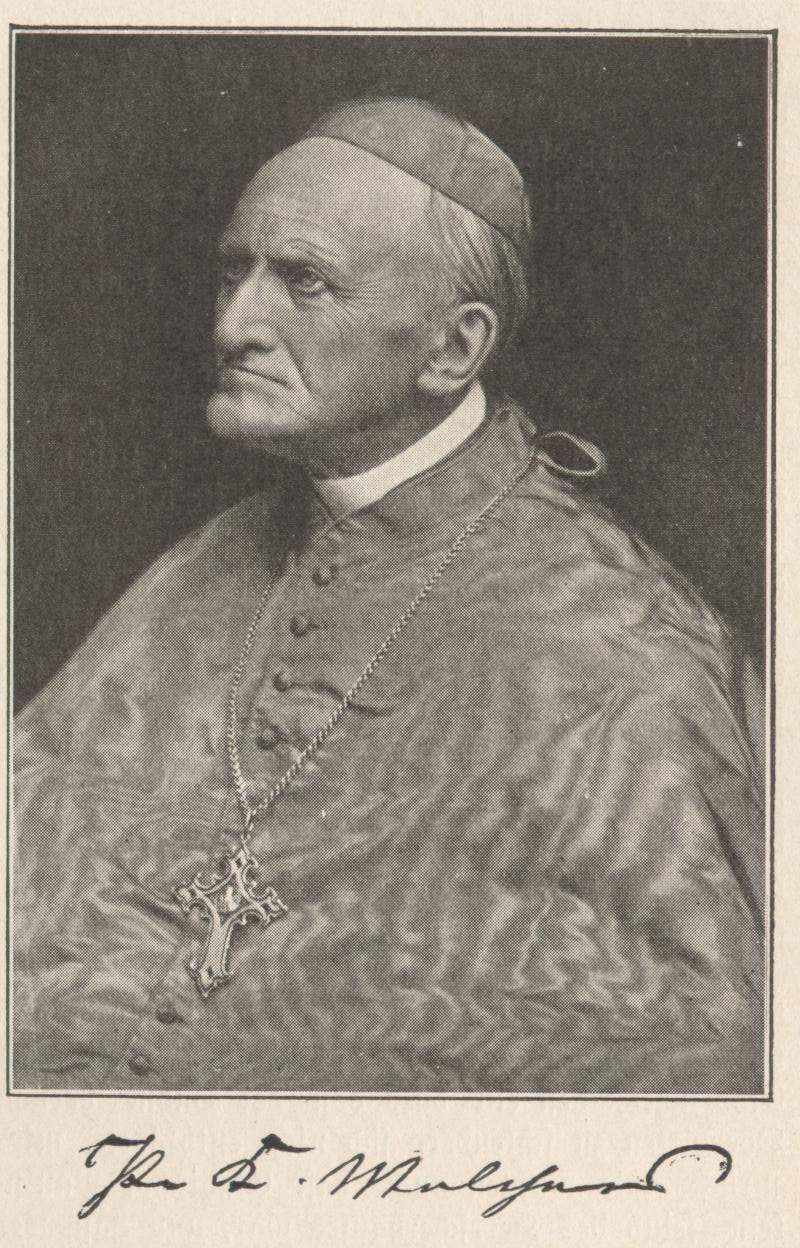
- Church: Roman Catholic
- Archdiocese: Cologne
- Installed: 8 January 1866
- Term ended: 3 July 1885
- Predecessor: Johannes von Geissel
- Successor: Philipp Krementz
- Other post: Cardinal-Priest of Santo Stefano al Monte Celio
- Previous post: Bishop of Osnabrück (1857-1866)

Orders
- Ordination: 5 June 1841
- Consecration: 20 April 1858
- Created cardinal: 27 July 1885 by Leo XIII
- Rank: Cardinal-Priest

Personal details
- Born: January 6, 1813 Münster, Kingdom of Prussia
- Died: December 14, 1895 (aged 82) Rome, Kingdom of Italy
- Buried: Cologne Cathedral

Paul Melchers (6 January 1813 – 14 December 1895) was a Cardinal and Archbishop of Cologne. At the height of the Kulturkampf he took refuge in the Netherlands.

== Early life ==
Melchers was born in Münster to a wealthy merchant family who were related to Bishop Franz Arnold Melchers. He studied law at Bonn (1830–33), and practiced for a few years at Münster. He then studied theology at Munich under Heinrich Klee, Joseph Görres, Karl Joseph Hieronymus Windischmann and Ignaz von Döllinger.

== Career ==
He was ordained in 1841 and assigned to duty in the village of Haltern. In 1844 he became vice-rector of the diocesan seminary, rector (1851), canon of the cathedral (1852), vicar-general (1854).

Pope Pius IX appointed him Bishop of Osnabrück (1857) and Archbishop of Cologne (1866). He inaugurated (1867) at Fulda, meetings of the German bishops. He regarded the formal definition of papal infallibility as untimely, a conviction which he, with thirteen other bishops, expressed in a letter to the pope, 4 September 1869.

In the First Vatican Council Melchers took a prominent part. At the session of 13 July 1870, he voted negatively on the question of papal infallibility; but he refused to sign an address in which fifty-five other members of the minority notified the pope of their immediate departure and reiterated their non placet. He left Rome before the fourth session, giving as his reason the outbreak of the Franco-Prussian War, and declaring his readiness to abide by the decisions of the Council.

On his return to Cologne he proclaimed in an address (24 July) the dogma defined on 18 July. As a means of ensuring obedience to the Council, the bishops assembled by him in Fulda, published (1 September) a joint letter, for which Pius IX (20 October) expressed gratitude. To eliminate the opposition at Bonn, the archbishop (20 Sept. and 8 Oct.) called on professors Franz Xaver Dieringer, Franz Heinrich Reusch, Joseph Langen, and Franz Peter Knoodt to sign a declaration accepting the Vatican decree and pledging conformity thereto in their teaching. Dieringer alone complied; the others were suspended and eventually (12 March 1872) excommunicated.

== The Kulturkampft ==
Between 1871 and 1876, the Prussian government issued several laws designed to enforce the supremacy of the state over the church; this became known as the Kulturkampft conflict.

The Kulturkampf was firmly resisted by Archbishop Melchers. In June, 1873, he excommunicated two priests who had joined the Old Catholics; for this and other administrative acts he was fined and imprisoned for six months (12 March–October, 1874). On 2 December 1875, the President of the Rhine Province demanded his resignation on pain of deposition; he refused, but learning that preparations were being made to deport him to Küstrin he escaped (13 December) to Maastricht and took refuge with the Franciscans. From their monastery he administered his dioceses for ten years. On different occasions he informed Pope Leo XIII of his willingness to resign for the general good. The pope at last consented, but called him to Rome, and created him cardinal on 27 July 1885.

== Later life ==
In 1892, during a serious illness he was received into the Society of Jesus and lived as a Jesuit until his death three years later in Rome. He was laid to rest in the cathedral of Cologne.

St. Paul's Church, Cologne, completed in 1908, commemorates Melchers.

== Works ==
Melchers' publications included:

- Erinnerungen an die Feier des 50jährigen Bischofsjubiläums des h. Vaters Pius IX. (Recollections on the Golden Jubilee of Pope Pius IX; Cologne, 1876)
- Eine Unterweisung über das Gebet (Cologne, 1876)
- Einer Unterweisung über des heilige Messopfer (Cologne, 1879)
- Das Sendschreiben des heiligen Vaters Papst Leo XIII. über den Socialismus (Cologne, 1880)
- Die katholische Lehre von der Kirche (Cologne, 1881)
- Das eine Nothwendige (Cologne, 1882)
- De canonica dioecesium visitatione (Rome, 1892)

== Sources ==
- Heinrich Maria Ludwigs, Kardinal Erzbischof Dr. Paulus Melchers und die St. Pauluskirche in Köln (Cologne, 1909)
- Theodor Granderath/Konrad Kirch, Geschichte des Vatikanischen Konzils, I, II, III (Freiburg, 1903–1906)
- Theodor Granderath, Acta et Decreta S. S. conciliorum recentiorum, tom. VII (Freiburg, 1890)
- Pflanze, Otto (1971). Bismarck and the Development of Germany, Volume II: The Period of Consolidation, 1871–1880. Princeton University Press. ISBN 0-691-05587-4.

Catholic Church titles
Vacant Title last held by Frederick, Duke of York and Albany	Bishop of Osnabrück; 1857–1866	Succeeded by Johannes Heinrich Beckmann
Preceded by Johannes von Geissel	Archbishop of Cologne; 1866–1885	Succeeded by Philip III, Krementz
Vacant Title last held by Johannes von Geissel; Chairman of the Würzburg Conference of Bishops	Chairman of the Fulda Conference of Bishops; 1867–1883	Succeeded by Philip III, Krementz
