= Hilgers =

Hilgers is a German surname. Notable people with the surname include:

- Bernhard Josef Hilgers (1803–1874), German Catholic Church historian
- Jan Hilgers (1886–1945), Dutch aviator
- Jens Hilgers (born 1975), German serial entrepreneur
- Josef Hilgers (1858–1918), German Jesuit writer
- Karl Hilgers (1844–1925), German sculptor
- Mees Hilgers (born 2001), Indonesian footballer
- Michael Hilgers (born 1966), German field hockey player
- Mike Hilgers (born 1978), American politician
- Walter Hilgers (born 1959), German tuba player and conductor
