= Amalie von Lasaulx =

German nun (1815–1872)

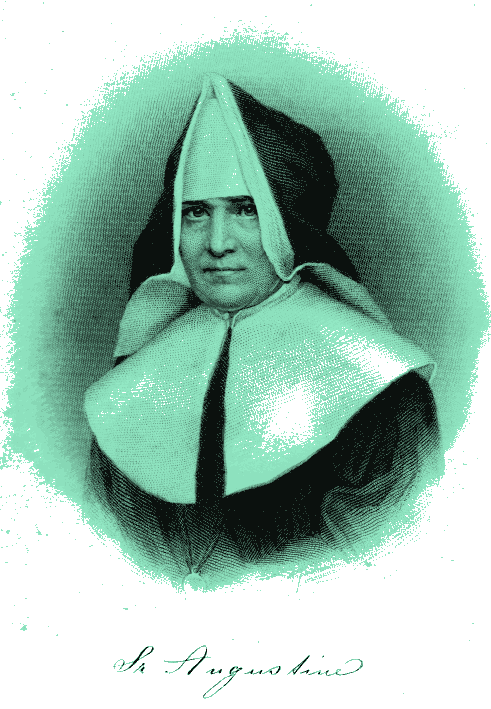
- Sister Augustine, Amalie von Lasaulx (c.1860)
- Born: 19 October 1815; Koblenz
- Died: 28 January 1872 (aged 56); Vallendar
- Burial place: Weißenthurm
- Other name: Sister Augustine
- Occupation: Religious nun
- Known for: Support for Old Catholic doctrines

Amalie von Lasaulx (also spelled Amalie von Lassaulx or Augustine von Lasaulx) (19 October 1815 in Koblenz – 28 January 1872 in Vallendar) was a German Catholic nun of the Sisters of Mercy (Borromean Sisters) and Superior of the Johannes Hospital in Bonn, Germany. Because she became a follower of the Old Catholic movement, she was expelled from her hospital position and the order, actions that were decried in the press.

== Biography ==
Amalie von Lasaulx was born on 19 October 1815, in Koblenz, daughter of Anna Maria Müller and the architect Johann Claudius von Lasaulx. A cheerful and active girl, she secretly practiced ice skating on the frozen Moselle River, something girls did not do.

After a broken marriage engagement, in 1840 Amalie joined the Sisters of Charity of St. Charles Borromeo at the age of 25, and took the religious name Sister Augustine. Beginning in 1849, she served as Superior of the Johannes Hospital in Bonn and became integrated into Bonn society, meeting other Catholics who shared her liberal views. During the wars of 1864 and 1866, she cared for the wounded in field hospitals in Schleswig and Bohemia, but she returned to Bonn suffering from a heart and lung condition.

When the First Vatican Council proclaimed the importance of following the Catholic dogma of papal infallibility in 1870, she considered this to be incompatible with her own personal Catholic spirituality. In her opposition, she was supported by the majority of professors at the Catholic Theological Faculty of the University of Bonn, particularly Bernhard Josef Hilgers, Franz Heinrich Reusch and Joseph Langen, with whom she maintained a lively intellectual exchange. Because she did not try to hide her liberal views, repeatedly citing her conscience and the hope for a "better future for the Catholic Church," she was expelled from her position as Hospital Superior in November 1871 for siding with the Old Catholic movement. Already very ill, she asked to be taken to a religious house in Vallendar that was run by her friend, the local superior Hedwig Cornelius (1822–1887).

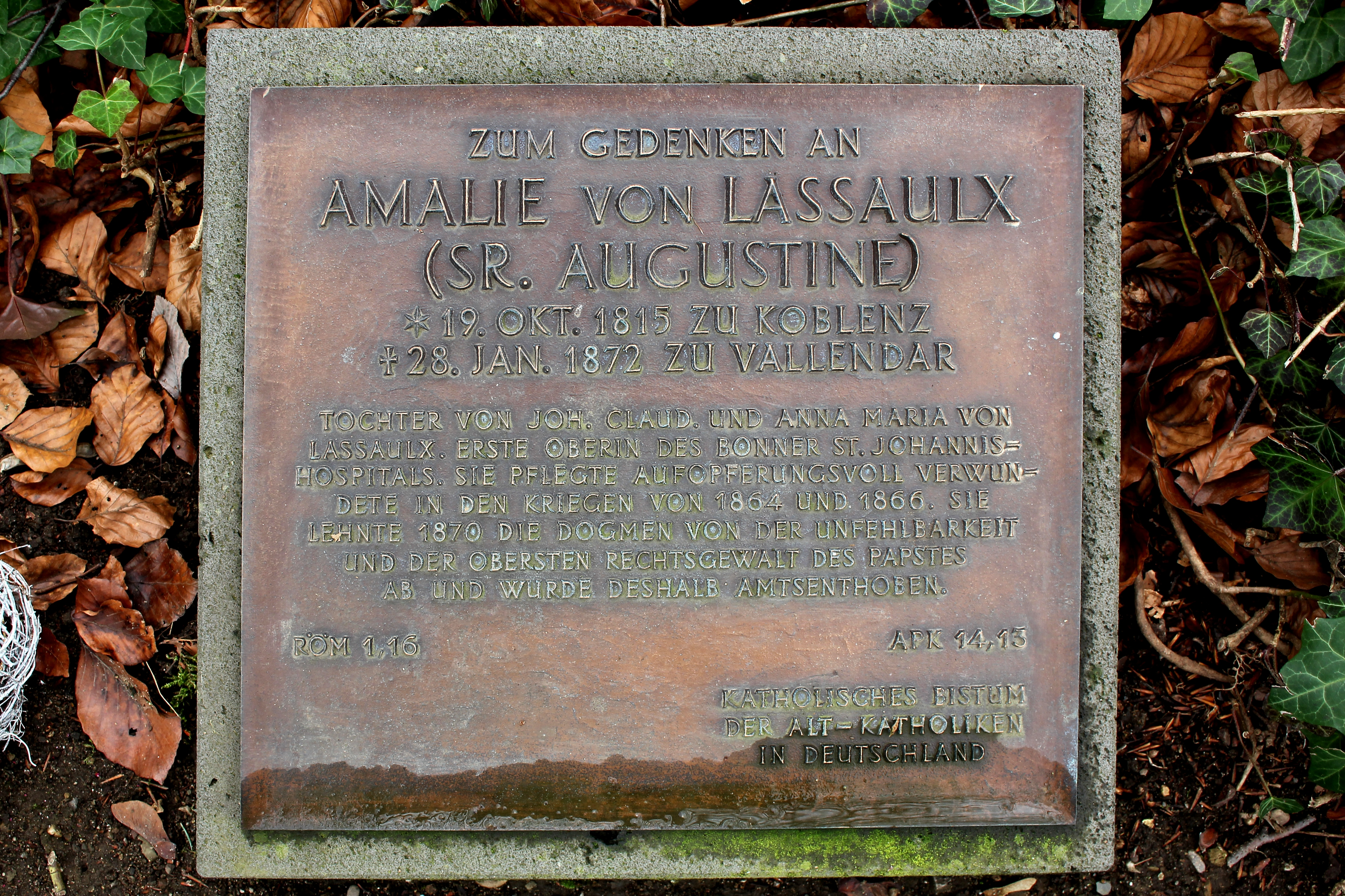
Cemetery marker for "Amalie von Lassaulx"

=== Final days ===
When she steadfastly refused to recognize the new dogma, she was officially expelled from the Order and denied the Catholic sacraments. However, one priest A. Hochstein who also professed the Old Catholic faith, was not yet suspended from the official Church so he was allowed to visit the ailing nun. He took that opportunity to secretly administer the sacrament of last rites. According to sources, "Various attempts at conversion, including by her old religious teacher Seydel and her biological sister Clementine (Anna), prompted her to have her sister Gertrud promise that after her death she would counter any lie that she had "converted" with a testimony of the truth." Sr. Augustine died at 58 on 28 January 1872.

After her death, her body was transported under degrading circumstances in a boat, unaccompanied by nuns, priests or relatives, to Weißenthurm on the other side of the Rhine River from Bonn. Amalie had requested to be buried there in her parents' grave.

Professor Franz Heinrich Reusch (1825–1900), Amalie's confessor until his excommunication for his Old Catholic beliefs, prayed at the grave in civilian dress and paid tribute to her. In the coffin, Amalie von Lasaulx wore no religious habit. Hastily gathered friends, including doctors, the hospital's accountant and servants, as well as Old Catholic members of the Bonn Theological Faculty, attended the ceremony and "covered the grave with wreaths and tears."

=== Legacy ===
The press defamed the Borromean Sisters for "having practically torn the habit from the exiled sister's body during her lifetime in order to disgrace the critic within their own ranks." Some say she "voluntarily exchanged the heavy garment for more comfortable clothing" before she died.

On Sister Augustine's 200th birthday, composer Uschi Geiger wrote a musical portrait of her life, which he performed for the first time in Koblenz in October 2015 and was repeated in February 2016.
