= Bernhard Josef Hilgers =

German Catholic church historian

Bernhard Josef Hilgers (20 August 1803 – 7 February 1874) was a German Catholic church historian born in Dreiborn in der Eifel.

== Biography ==
Hilgers studied at the University of Bonn, and in 1827 was ordained as a priest in Cologne. He spent a year as an associate pastor in Münstereifel, followed by five years service as a chaplain at the mental asylum in Siegburg. In 1834 he received his doctorate of theology at Münster, and during the following year, obtained his habilitation at the Catholic theological faculty in Bonn. From 1838 he served as pastor at the Church of St Remigius, Bonn, then in 1846 became a full professor of church history at the university.

He was excommunicated in 1872, along with Bonn colleagues Franz Peter Knoodt, Joseph Langen and Franz Heinrich Reusch, by Paul Melchers, Archbishop of Cologne, in the debate over papal infallibility.

In 1841 he published "Symbolische Theologie, oder die Lehrgegensätze des Katholicismus und Protestantismus" ("Symbolic theology, or the teaching opposites of Catholicism and Protestantism").

== See also ==
- Josef Hilgers
