= John Frederick =

John Frederick may refer to:

- John Frederick of Holstein-Gottorp (1579–1634), Lutheran administrator of the prince-bishoprics of Bremen, Lübeck and Verden
- John Frederick I, Elector of Saxony (1503–1554), known as "The Magnanimous"
- John Frederick II, Duke of Saxony (1529–1595), prince of the House of Wettin
- John Frederick III, Duke of Saxony (1538–1565), German nobleman
- John Frederick, Duke of Württemberg (1582–1628)
- John Frederick (London MP) (1601–1685), British member of parliament for Dartmouth, 1660–1661, and City of London, 1663–1679, and Lord Mayor of London
- Sir John Frederick, 4th Baronet (1708–1783), British member of parliament for New Shoreham, 1740–1741, and West Looe, 1743–1761
- Sir John Frederick, 5th Baronet (1750–1825), British member of parliament for Newport, 1774–1780, Christchurch, 1781–1790, and Surrey, 1794–1807
- John Frederick, a pseudonym of Frederick Schiller Faust (1892–1944), American western author known as Max Brand
- John Frederick, Margrave of Brandenburg-Ansbach (1654–1686)
- John Frederick (English cricketer) (1846–1907), English cricketer
- John Frederick (Australian cricketer), Australian cricketer
- John T. Frederick (1893–1975), literary editor, scholar, critic, and novelist
- John Frederick, Duke of Saxe-Weimar (1600–1628), Duke of Saxe-Weimar
- John Frederick, Count Palatine of Sulzbach-Hilpoltstein (1587–1644)
- John Frederick, Duke of Brunswick (1625–1679)
- John Frederick, Duke of Pomerania (1542–1600)
- John Frederick, Prince of Schwarzburg-Rudolstadt (1721–1767)
- John W. Frederick Jr. (1923–1972), American Marine POW during the Vietnam War
- Johnny Frederick (1902–1977), American Major League Baseball outfielder

== See also ==
- Johannes Friedrich (disambiguation)
- John Friedrich (disambiguation)
