= Le Catholique National =

19th-century Catholic journal published in Switzerland

- Front cover of Le Catholique National July 13th 1895
- Type: Newspaper
- Owner: Organe Des Catholiques-Chretiens De La Suisse Romande
- Editor-in-chief: Professor Dr Eugène Michaud
- Editor: M. Steinmann
- Founded: 1891
- Ceased publication: 1908
- Language: French
- City: Bern
- Country: Switzerland
- Sister newspapers: Der Katholik : schweizerisches Organ für kirchlichen Fortschritt

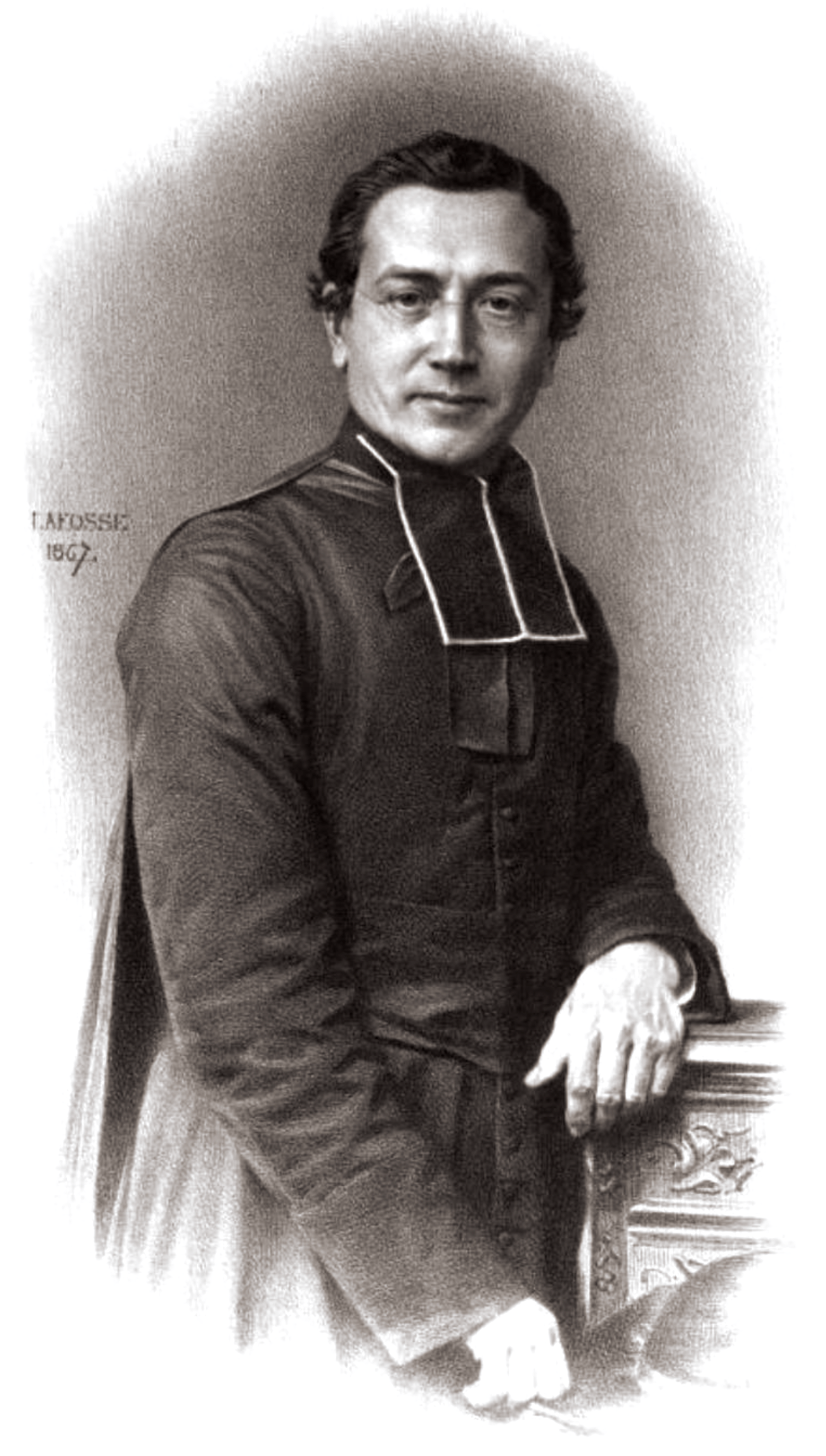
Eugène Michaud, editor of chief, in 1867

Le Catholique National (transl. The Catholic National) was a Catholic newspaper published in Switzerland in the late 19th century by the Christian Catholic Church of French speaking Switzerland. It was published from 1891 to 1908 in Bern, Switzerland, and was kept at the Stämpfli Library for many years. It exists still in the library of the University of Bern.

== History ==
Following The First Vatican Council there were several dissident groups that separated from Rome due to concerns over Ultramontanism or infallibility. In Germany, Joseph Hubert Reinkens, led the Old Catholics (Altkatholiken). but in Switzerland, a similar movement began under the direction of Ignaz Von Döllinger who also rejected the doctrine of papal infallibility.

One year after Ignaz Von Döllinger died in 1890, the newspaper Le Catholique National was founded and began printing on behalf of the Christian Catholic Church from Bern, Switzerland and was edited by Eugène Michaud.

Le Catholique National also had a sister newspaper in German entitled Der Katholik: Schweizerisches Organ Für Kirchlichen Fortschritt

== Controversy ==
Following a nearly 18-month contest over his cardinalship, on 25 November 1894 Cardinal Sarto, who would later become Pope Pius X, gave a sermon where he celebrated Solemn High Mass in the Cathedral of St. Mark and addressed his first words to them from the pulpit. At that sermon, the Cardinal allegedly stated the following which was broadcast a couple of months later by various newspapers:

"The Pope is not simply the representative of Jesus Christ. On the contrary, he is Jesus Christ Himself, under the veil of the flesh, and who by means of a being common to humanity continues His ministry amongst men ... Does the Pope speak? It is Jesus Christ Who is speaking. Does he teach? It is Jesus Christ Who teaches."

Following the publication by Evangelical Christendom on 1 January 1895, Le Catholique National whose authors had long opposed ultramontanism picked up the topic and published the full quote on 13 July 1895 where they quoted Cardinal Sarto as follows in French:

"Le pape n'est pas seulement le représentant de J.-C., mais ilest J.-C. lui-même, caché sous le voile de la chair. Le pape parle-t-il? c'est J.-C. qui parle. Le pape accorde-t-il une grâce ou prononce-t-il un anathème? c'est J.-C. qui prononce l'anathème ou qui accorde la grâce."

Quote from Le Catholique National July 13th 1895

The subsequent backlash from the quote prompted a query as to the precise wording and in 1896, the Publications for the Catholic Truth Society responded by providing a letter from the Cardinal in response. Cardinal Sarto replied citing a sermon given one month after the article in Evangelical Christendom which was given on the anniversary of the election of Pope Leo XIII on 20 February 1895 where he stated that the "Pope represents Jesus Christ Himself and therefore is a loving father".
