= Johann Hermann =

French physician and naturalist (1738–1800)

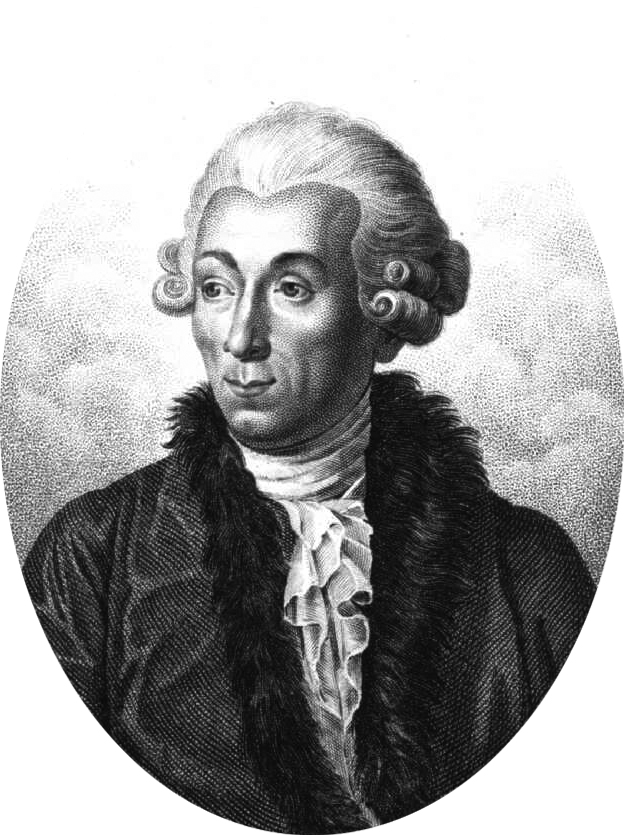
- Born: 31 December 1738; Barr, Alsace, France
- Died: 4 October 1800 (aged 61); Strasbourg, France
- Other names: Johann, or Jean-Frederic, Hermann, or Herrmann
- Known for: His collections and library of 18,000 volumes
- Children: Jean-Frédéric Hermann
- Scientific career
- Fields: Physician and naturalist
- Institutions: School of Public Health of Strasbourg, School of Medicine, Strasbourg
- Author abbrev. (botany): Herrm.
- Author abbrev. (zoology): Hermann

Johann, or Jean-Frederic, Hermann, or Herrmann, (31 December 1738 in Barr, Alsace – 4 October 1800 in Strasbourg) was a French physician and naturalist.

In 1769 he was appointed professor of medicine at the School of Public Health of Strasbourg, then, in 1778, professor of philosophy, before going on, in 1784, to succeed Jacob Reinbold Spielmann as chair of chemistry, natural history and materia medica. In 1794 he became professor of botany and materia medica in the new School of Medicine.

He was the author of Tabula affinitatum animalium (1783) and Observationes zoologicae quibus novae complures, published posthumously in 1804.

His collections and library of 18,000 volumes formed the basis of the Natural History Museum of Strasbourg, where a reconstruction of his natural history cabinet was opened in 1988.

Hermann was also in charge of Strasbourg's botanical garden, where he was responsible for a large increase in the number of living plant species. The garden was threatened with closure by the city administration during the French Revolution, and was only saved by the efforts of Hermann.

His zoological collection, including 200 mammals, 900 birds, more than 200 reptiles, many fish, invertebrates and dried plants, was bought by the city of Strasbourg in 1804 and served as the base for the Strasbourg zoological Museum.

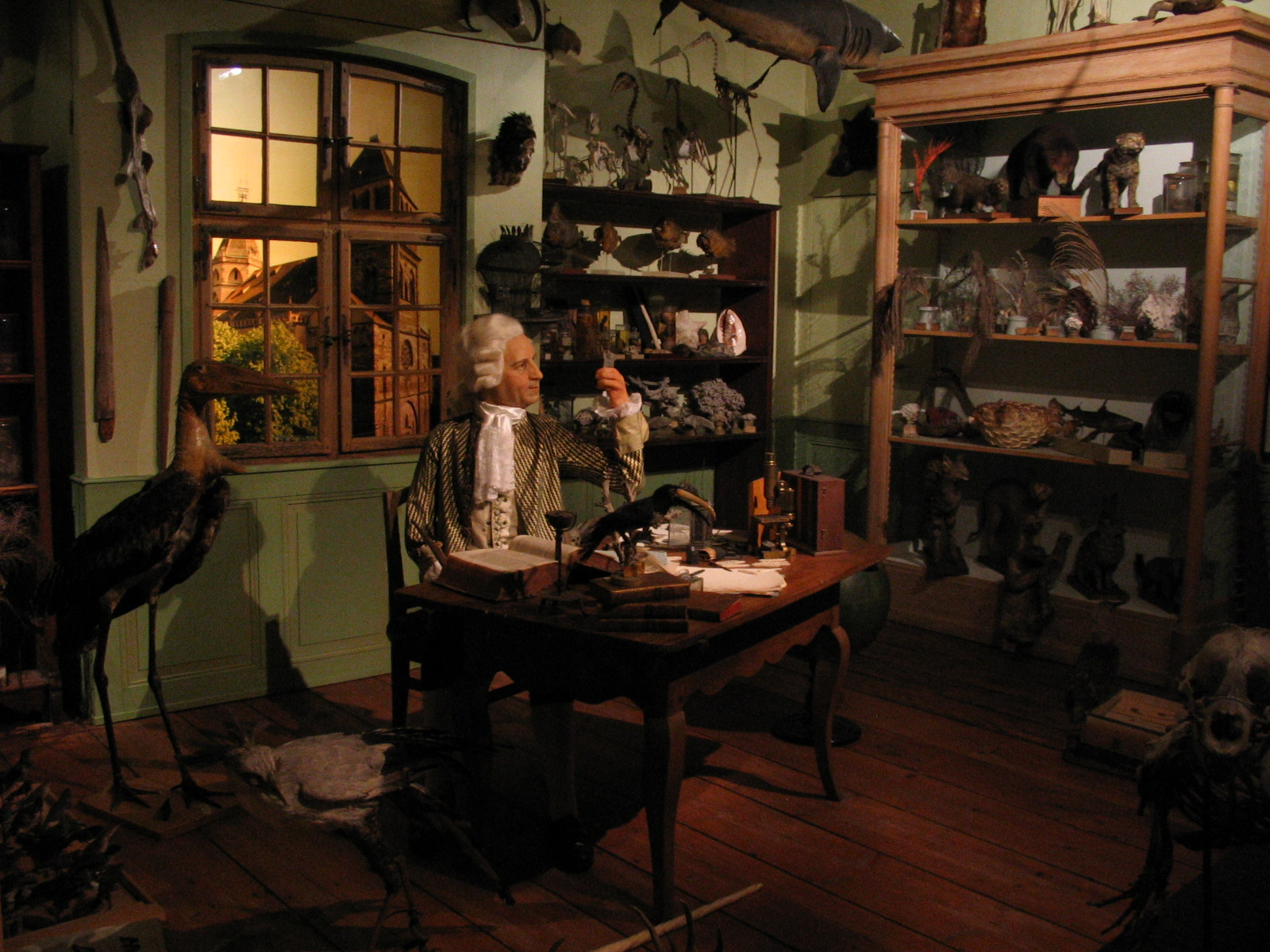
Reconstruction of Professor Hermann's cabinet of natural history in the Musée zoologique de la ville de Strasbourg

His brother, Jean-Frédéric Hermann (1743–1820), Professor of Law, was a member of the Lower Rhine and Mayor of Strasbourg.

His son, Jean-Frédéric Hermann (1768–1793), would follow in his footsteps both in medicine and in natural history, until his untimely death during the revolutionary wars put an end to his ambitions.

Hermann's name survives most famously through Hermann's tortoise (Testudo hermanni ).
