= Philipp Krementz =

German Catholic bishop

His Eminence Philipp Krementz
- Cardinal, Archbishop of Cologne
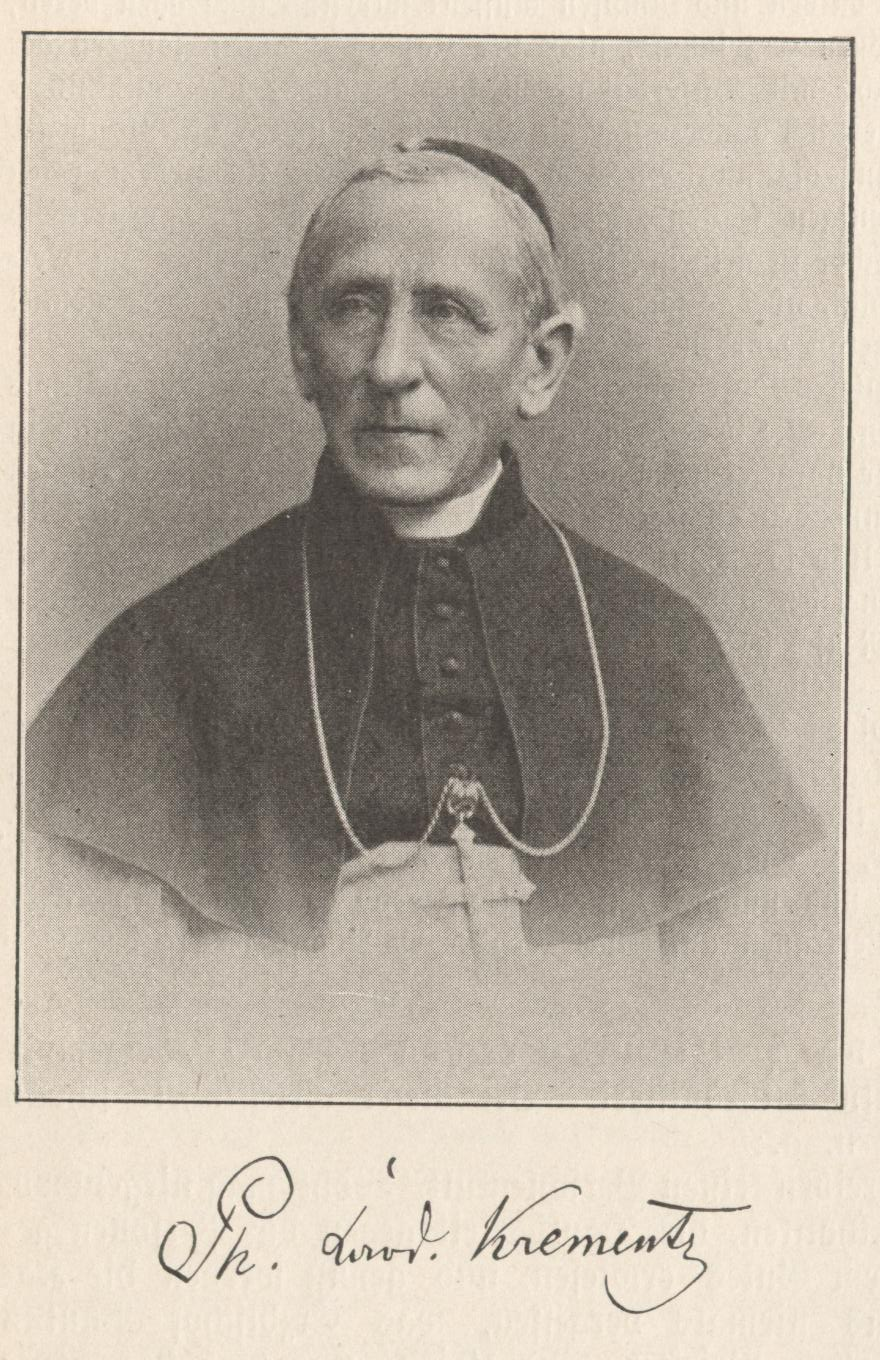
- Church: Roman Catholic
- Archdiocese: Cologne
- Installed: 15 December 1885
- Term ended: 6 May 1899
- Predecessor: Paul Melchers
- Successor: Hubert Theophil Simar
- Other post: Cardinal-Priest of San Crisogono
- Previous post: Bishop of Warmia (1867-1885)

Orders
- Ordination: 27 August 1842
- Consecration: 3 May 1868
- Created cardinal: 16 January 1893 by Leo XIII
- Rank: Cardinal-Priest

Personal details
- Born: December 1, 1819 Koblenz, Kingdom of Prussia
- Died: May 6, 1899 (aged 79) Cologne, German Empire
- Buried: Cologne Cathedral
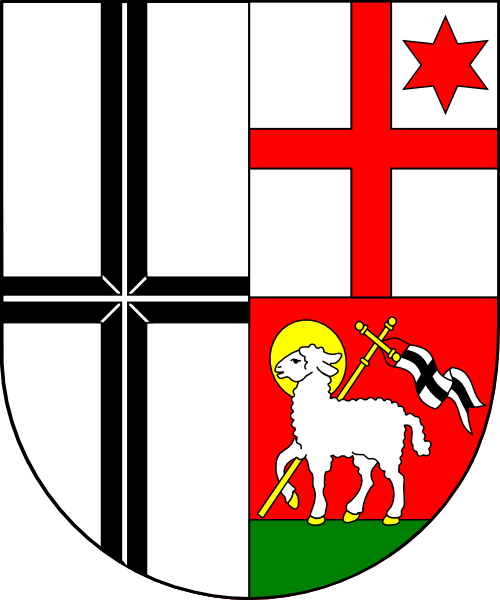
- Coat of arms

Philipp Krementz (1 December 1819 – 6 May 1899) was a German Catholic bishop, created Cardinal in 1893.

Philipp Krementz was born, the son of a butcher, in Koblenz in 1837 and began to study theology in Bonn, which he continued in Munich in 1839. After his ordination on 27 August 1842 in Koblenz, he worked as a chaplain. In 1846 he worked as a religion teacher at the Knight's Academy in Bedburg. In January 1848 he became pastor of St. Castor in Koblenz and 1853 Dean of the Deanery in Koblenz.

On 21 June 1859 he was appointed an honorary canon of Trier Cathedral, which he refused. In 1864 and 1867 he was on the list of candidates for the episcopal elections in Cologne and Trier.

The chapter of Frombork cathedral elected Krementz, who was favored by the Queen of Prussia and whom he knew personally, as Bishop of Warmia on 22 October 1867. He was enthroned on 24 May 1868. He was consecrated bishop by the archbishop of Cologne Paul Melchers on 3 May. In 1868, he received an honorary citizen of his home town of Koblenz.

He participated in the First Vatican Council of 1869. He left Rome with 54 other bishops before the end of the Council. Therefore, he did not take part in the solemn vote of 18 July 1870. However, he leaned the Council decisions and preached the infallibility dogma in his diocese. In 1872, he excommunicated five clergy from his diocese who were against the infallibility of the Pope, which led to a conflict with the Prussian state. The conflict ended on 25 September 1872.

In March 1885, the Vatican and the Prussian State agreed on the replacement of the vacant chair of the Archbishop of Cologne. Pope Leo XIII appointed Krementz as the new Archbishop of Cologne on 30 July 1885. He was installed on December 15. In 1886, he became chairman of the German Bishops' Conference in Fulda. On 16 January 1893, he was elevated to cardinal. He was assigned the titular church of San Crisogono.

At the end of his life, the archbishop was completely mentally shattered and could be dissuaded with difficulty by a belief that the world would end by the year 1950. Krementz died on 6 May 1899 in Cologne and was buried in the crypt of Cologne Cathedral.

Catholic Church titles
Preceded by Joseph Ambrosius Geritz	Bishop of Ermland; 1867–1885	Succeeded by Andreas Thiel
Preceded by Paul Melchers	Archbishop of Cologne; 1885–1899	Succeeded by Hubert Theophil Simar
Preceded by Paul Melchers	Chairman of the Fulda Conference of Bishops; 1884–1896	Succeeded by Georg Kopp
