= Franz Peter Knoodt =

German Catholic theologian (1811–1889)

Franz Peter Knoodt (6 November 1811 – 27 January 1889) was a German Catholic theologian who was a native of Boppard.

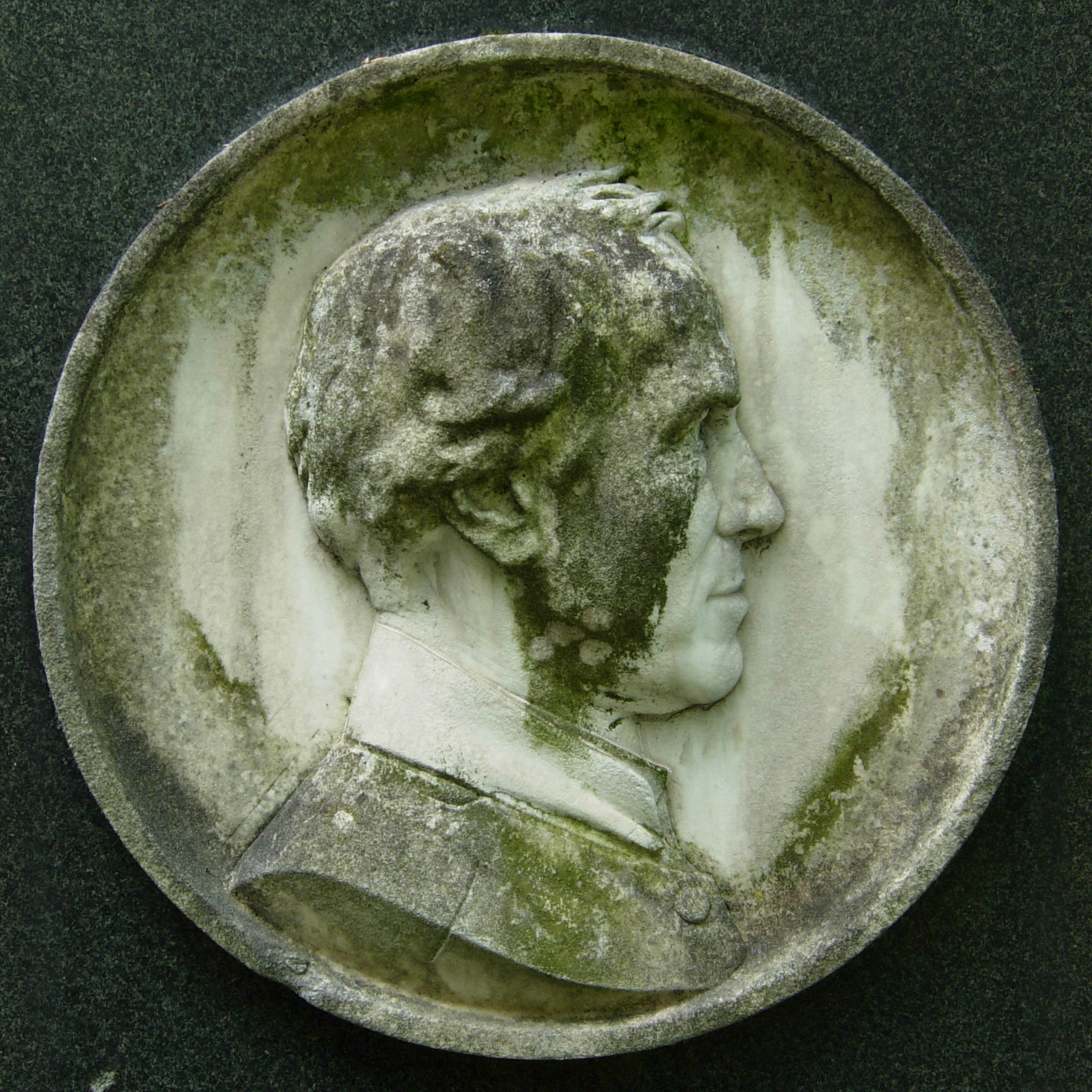
Relief of Franz Peter Knoodt, in Bonn.

He studied theology in Bonn und Tübingen, and later worked as a chaplain and teacher in Trier. In 1841-43 he furthered his studies in Vienna, where he was a student of Anton Günther (1783–1863). In 1844 he earned his doctorate of theology at Breslau, and in 1845 became a professor of philosophy at the Catholic faculty of theology at the University of Bonn. From May 1848 to February 1849 he was a member of the Frankfurt National Assembly.

Knoodt was an ardent follower of the philosophical teachings of Anton Günther, and several years after Günther's death, he published the biographical Anton Günther. Eine Biographie (1881, 2 volumes). This work has been praised as an important source of Catholic church history. Another noted work of Knoodt's was Günther und Clemens; Offene Briefe (Günther and Franz Jakob Clemens; Open Letters, 1853–54). Both publications were placed on the Index Librorum Prohibitorum (List of Prohibited Books) by the Roman Catholic Church. He was excommunicated in 1872, along with Bonn colleagues Joseph Langen, Franz Heinrich Reusch and Bernhard Josef Hilgers, by Paul Melchers, Archbishop of Cologne, in the debate over papal infallibility.
