= Johannes Friedrich =

Johannes Friedrich may refer to:

- Johannes Friedrich (bishop) (1948–2025), German Lutheran bishop
- Johannes Friedrich (linguist) (1893–1972), German hittitologist

== See also ==
- Johann Friedrich (theologian) (1836–1917), German theologian
- Johann Friedrich, Duke of Pomerania
- Johann Frederick, Duke of Württemberg
- John Friedrich (disambiguation)
- John Frederick (disambiguation)
