= Jakob Frohschammer =

German theologian and philosopher

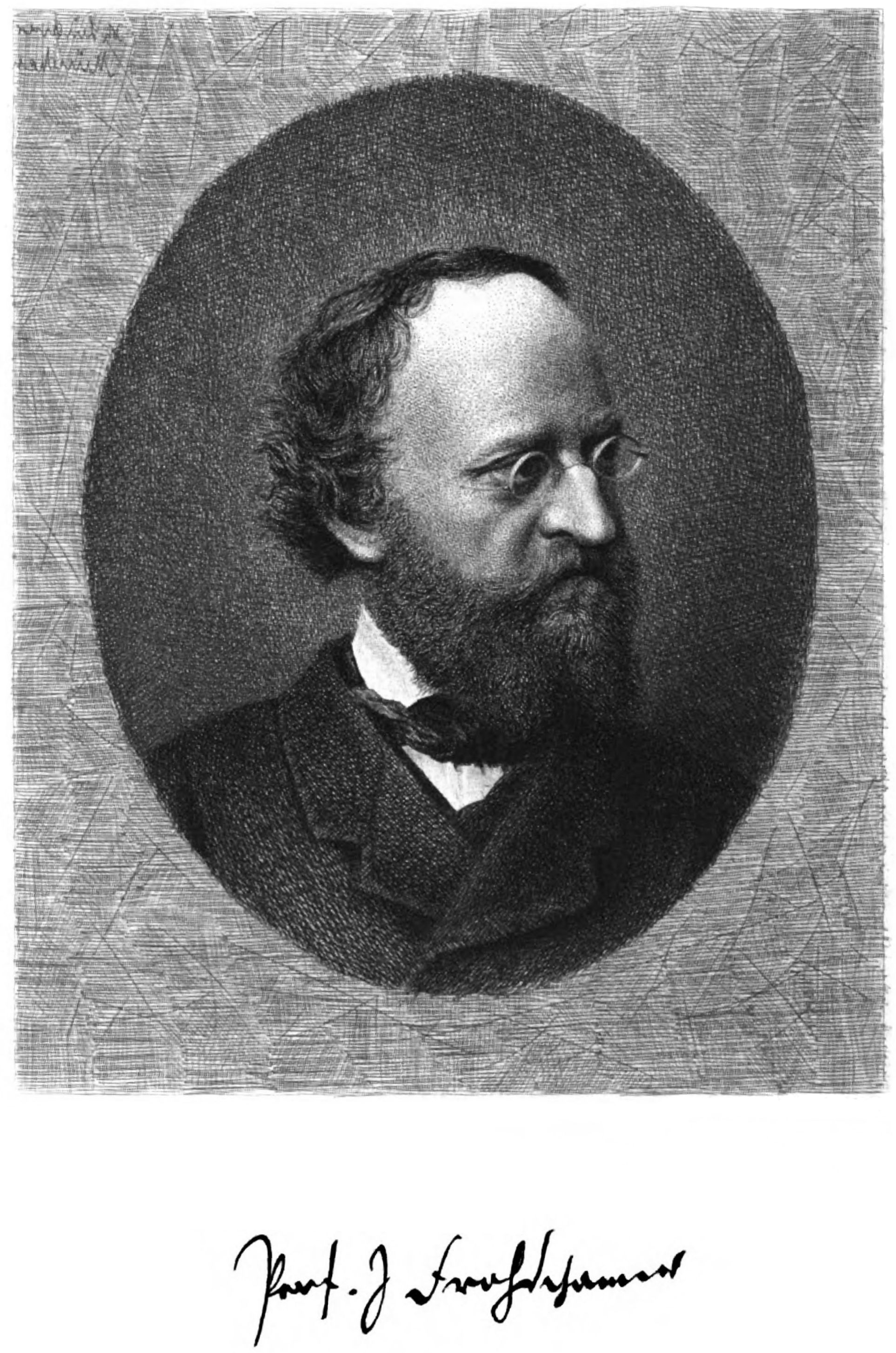
Jakob Frohschammer

Jakob Frohschammer (6 January 1821 – 14 June 1893) was a German theologian and philosopher.

== Biography ==
Frohschammer was born at Illkofen, which is now in the municipality of Barbing, near Regensburg. Destined by his parents for the Roman Catholic priesthood, he studied theology at the Ludwig-Maximilians-Universität München, but felt an ever-growing attraction to philosophy. Nevertheless, after much hesitation, he took what he himself calls the most mistaken step of his life, and in 1847 entered the priesthood. His keenly logical intellect, and his impatience of authority where it clashed with his own convictions, quite unfitted him for that unquestioning obedience which the Church demanded. It was only after open defiance of Valentin Riedel, the bishop of Regensburg, that he obtained permission to continue his studies at the Ludwig-Maximilians-Universität München.

He died at Bad Kreuth in the Bavarian Highlands on 14 June 1893.

== Academic career ==
=== Beginnings ===
He at first devoted himself more especially to the study of the history of dogma, and in 1850 published his Beiträge zur Kirchengeschichte, which was placed on the Index Expurgatorius. But he felt that his real vocation was philosophy, and after holding for a short time an extraordinary professorship of theology, he became professor of philosophy in 1855. This appointment he owed chiefly to his work, Über den Ursprung der menschlichen Seelen (1854), in which he maintained that the human soul was not implanted by a special creative act in each case, but was the result of a secondary creative act on the part of the parents: that soul as well as body, therefore, was subject to the laws of heredity. This was supplemented in 1855 by the controversial Menschenseele und Physiologie ("Physiology and the Soul of Man").

Undeterred by the offence which these work gave to his ecclesiastical superiors, he published in 1858 the Einleitung in die Philosophie und Grundriss der Metaphysik in which he assailed the doctrine of Thomas Aquinas that philosophy was the handmaid of theology. In 1861 appeared Über die Aufgabe der Naturphilosophie und ihr Verhältnis zu Naturwissenschaft, which was, he declared, directed against the purely mechanical conception of the universe, and affirmed the necessity of a creative power. In the same year he published Über die Freiheit der Wissenschaft, in which he maintained the independence of science, whose goal was truth, against authority and reproached the excessive respect for the latter in the Roman Church with the insignificant part played by the German Catholic in literature and philosophy.

=== Denunciation and excommunication ===
He was denounced by the pope himself in an apostolic brief of 11 December 1862 and students of theology were forbidden to attend his lectures. Public opinion was now keenly excited; he received an ovation from the students at the Ludwig-Maximilians-Universität München, and the king, to whom he owed his appointment, supported him warmly. A conference of Catholic savants, held in 1863 under the presidency of Döllinger, decided that authority must be supreme in the Church. When, however, Döllinger and his school in their turn started the Old Catholic movement, Frohschammer refused to associate himself with their cause, holding that they did not go far enough, and that their declaration of 1863 had cut the ground from under their feet.

Meanwhile, he had, in 1862, founded the Athenäum as the organ of Liberal Catholicism. For this he wrote the first adequate account in German of the Darwinian theory of natural selection, which drew a warm letter of appreciation from Darwin himself. Excommunicated in 1871, he replied with three articles, which were reproduced in thousands as pamphlets in the chief European languages: Der Fels Petri in Rom (1873), Der Primat Petri und des Papstes (1875), and Das Christenthum Christi und das Christenthum des Papstes (1876).

=== Other writings ===
In Das neue Wissen und der neue Glaube (1873) he showed himself as vigorous and opponent of the materialism of David Strauss as of the doctrine of papal infallibility. His later years were occupied with a series of philosophical works, of which the most important were: Die Phantasie als Grundprincip des Welt processes (1877), Ueber die Genesis der Menschheit und deren geistige Entwicklung in Religion, Sittlichkeit und Sprache (1883), and Ueber die Organisation und Cultur der menschlichen Gesellschaft (1885). His system is based on the unifying principle of imagination (Phantasie), which he extends to the objective creative force of Nature, as well as to the subjective mental phenomena to which the term is usually confined.

In addition to other treatises on theological subjects, Frohschammer was also the author of Monaden und Weltphantasie and Über die Bedeutung der Einbildungskraft in der Philosophie Kants und Spinozas (1879); Über die Principien der Aristotelischen Philosophie und die Bedeutung der Phantasie in der selben (1881); Die Philosophie als Idealwissenschaft und System (1884); Die Philosophie des Thomas von Aquino kritisch gewürdigt (1889); Über das Mysterium Magnum des Daseins (1891); System der Philosophie im Umriss, pt. i. (1892). His autobiography was published in A. Hinrichsen's Deutsche Denker (1888).
