= Musée zoologique de la ville de Strasbourg =

Coordinates: 48°34′58.5″N 7°45′53.5″E

Zoological Museum of Strasbourg
- Musée Zoologique de la Ville de Strasbourg
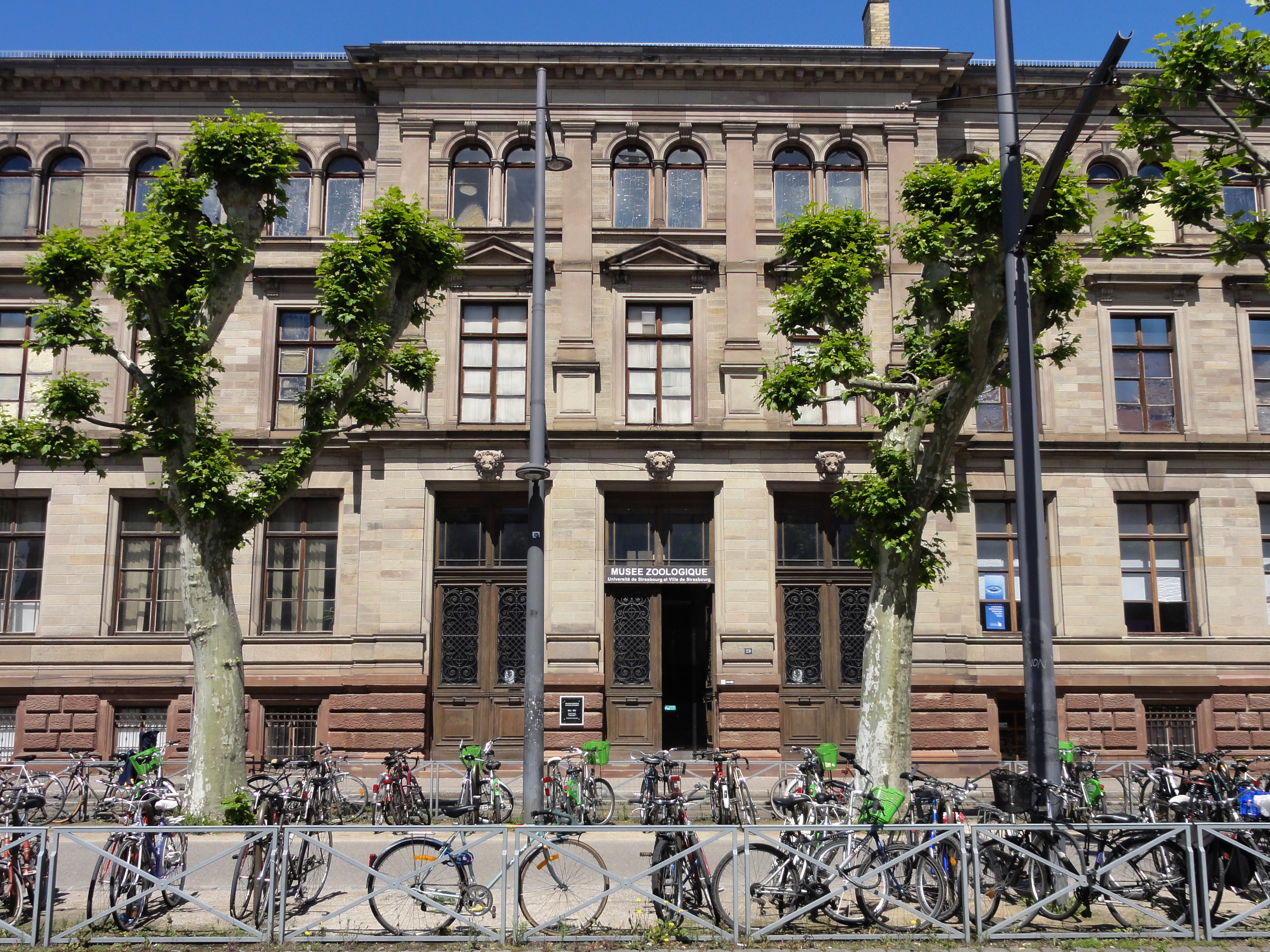
- Established: 1804
- Location: 29 boulevard de la Victoire, Strasbourg, France
- Type: Science museum
- Collections: natural history
- Collection size: 1,200,000
- Director: Samuel Cordier
- Owner: Ville de Strasbourg
- Website: www.musees.strasbourg.eu/musee-zoologique

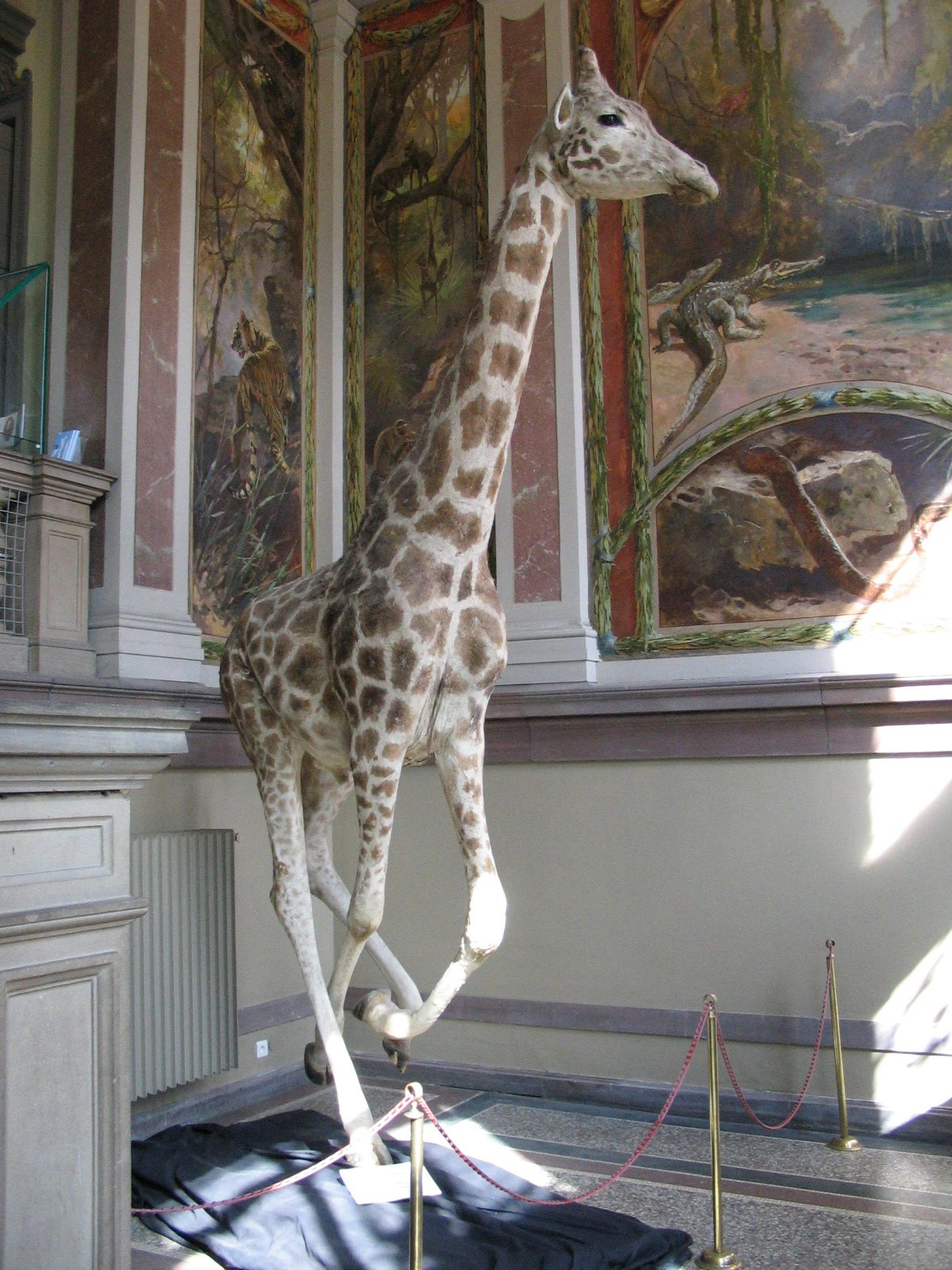
A stuffed giraffe and frescoes at the entrance to the museum.

The Musée zoologique de la ville de Strasbourg is a natural history museum managing and displaying the zoological collections of the city of Strasbourg. It is housed in a historical building of the University of Strasbourg. The museum underwent a thorough renovation and enlargement in the 21st century from September 2019 to September 2025.

== History ==
In 1804, the city of Strasbourg purchased the collections of local doctor and naturalist Johann Hermann (1738-1800). His collections (zoology, botany, mineralogy) were first exhibited in his apartment, before being successively accommodated in the buildings of the Great Seminary (adjacent to the cathedral) and in the Krutenau neighbourhood.

After the Franco-Prussian War, Strasbourg became the regional capital of the new Reichsland. The University of Strasbourg was created anew in 1872, and the management and curation of the collections were entrusted to it. Following the example implemented by Wilhelm von Humboldt in Berlin, collections were divided between the different faculties, although the zoological collections remained the property of the city. A spacious new building was erected for Zoology from 1890 to 1893, and the collection continued to grow.

In 2010, the museum acquired the first osteotheque in northeastern France.

== Renovation ==
The museum closed to the public on September 22, 2019 after the European Heritage Days. Three years of work were planned to completely renovate the building. The reopening is now announced for 2025. The cost of the works amounts to 13 million euros.

The renovation program is conducted jointly by the University and city of Strasbourg. It will allow the museum to reach current insulation, accessibility and security standards, and renew its permanent exhibition. The renovated building will encompass 2000 square meters of exhibits, as well as 800 square meters dedicated to its audiences.

Since October 2020, the collections have been kept at the Center for Study and Conservation of the Museums of the City of Strasbourg. They will find their way back into the museum at the end of the renovation.

== Collections ==
The museum houses a variety of specimens, including birds, mammals, marine invertebrates and insects. The collection originates from the natural history cabinet of Jean Hermann, and were enriched throughout history, thanks to gifts, expeditions and purchases.

Many specimens were acquired thanks to the proximity between the museum and scientists from all across Europe. Exchanges and interpersonal relations allowed the successive directors to receive collections from the Paris National Museum of Natural History, as well as from the German scientific expeditions of the 1890s and 1900s.

Collections also include historical books and prints, as well as plaster and glass pedagogical models made by doctor Louis Auzoux and brothers Leopold and Rudolf Blaschka, respectively. The museum holds specimens belonging to species that are rarely seen, like the coelacanth and night parrot, or declared extinct, such as the thylacine, great auk or passenger pigeon.

Collections include:

- 900,000 insects
- 200,000 molluscs
- 18,000 birds
- 10,000 mammals
- 5000 reptiles and amphibians

Since 2013, the Museum has been publishing its data of the GBIF portal.

== Gallery ==
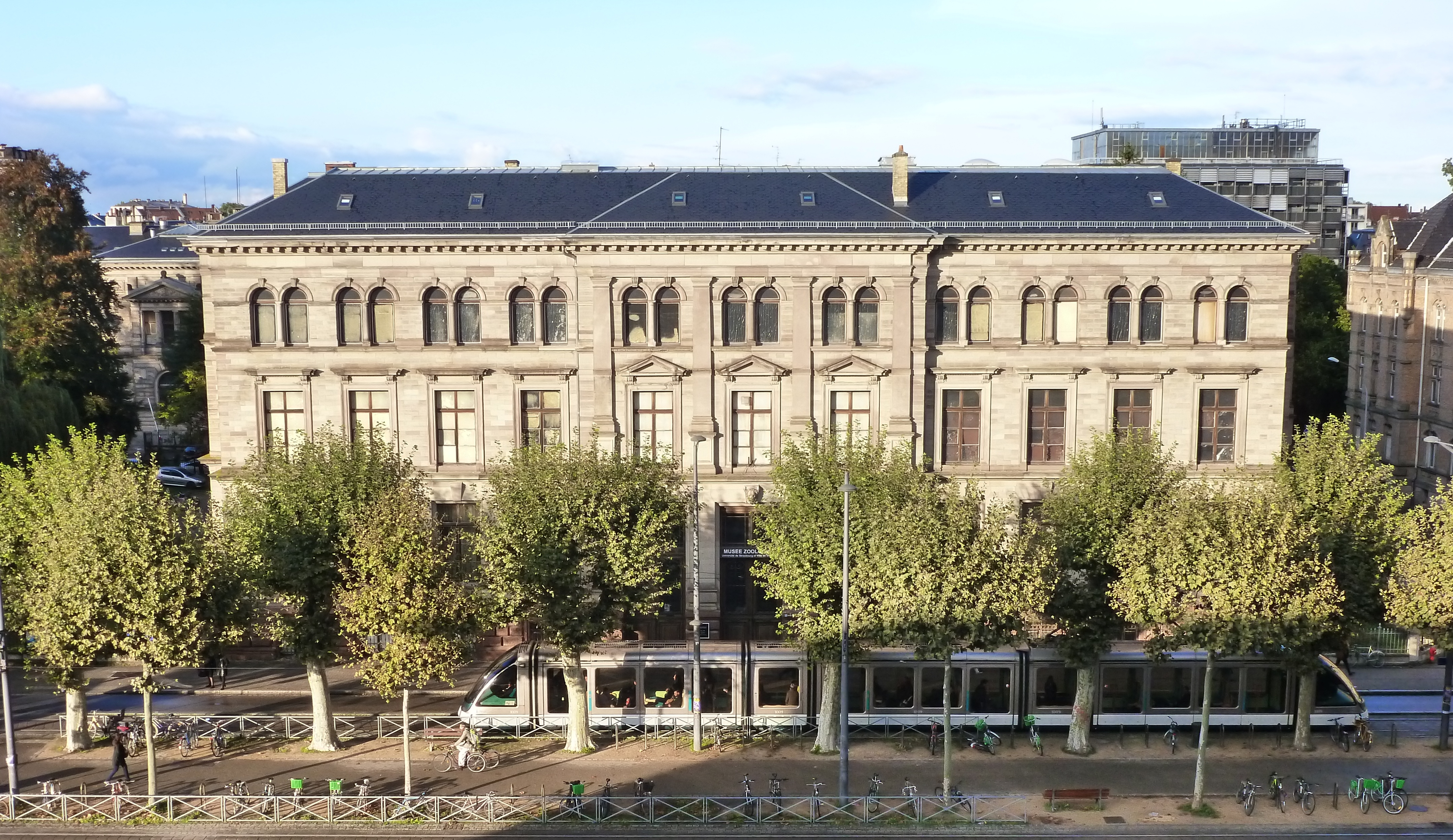
Main facade of the museum

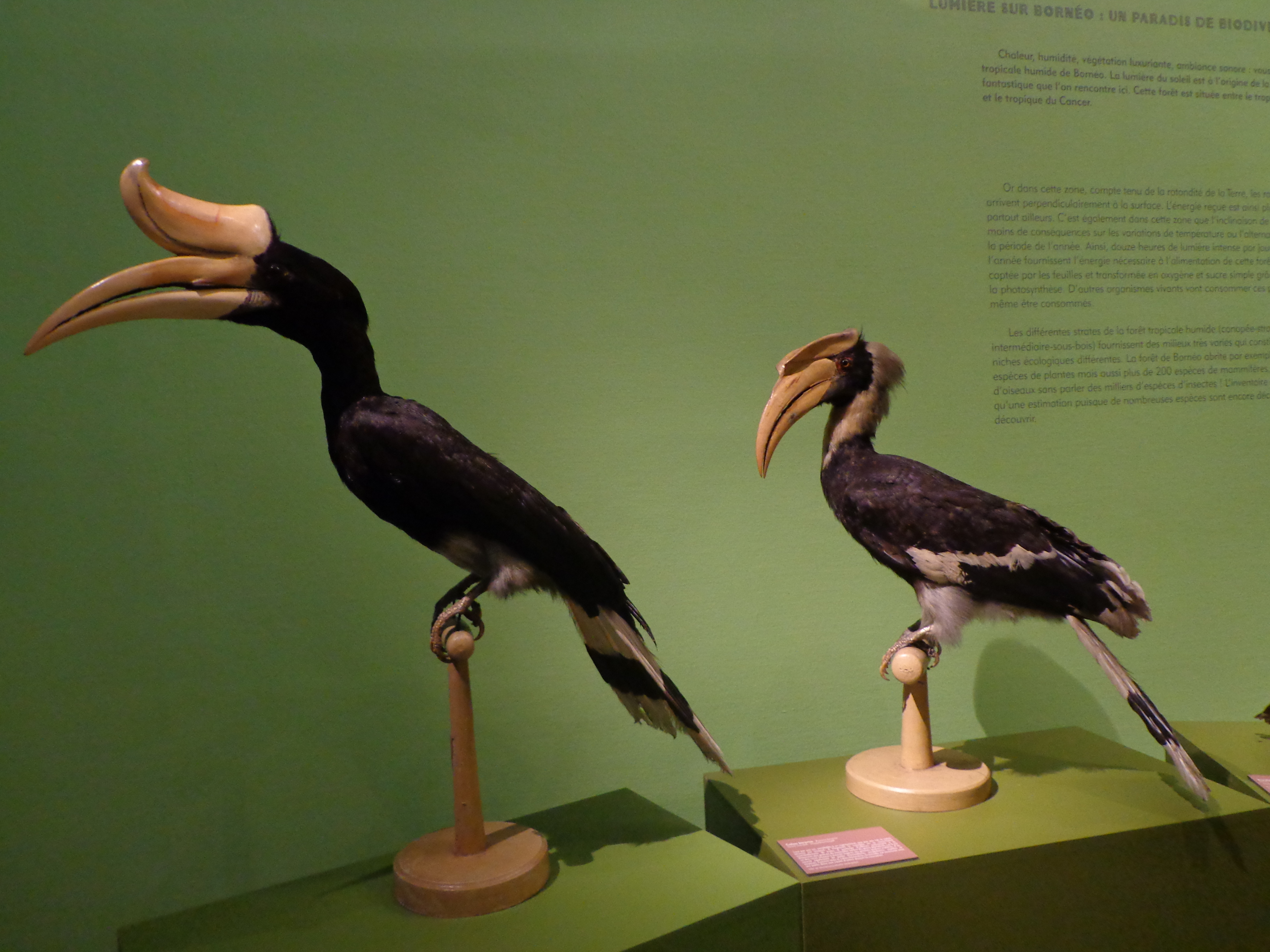
birds in the old exhibit

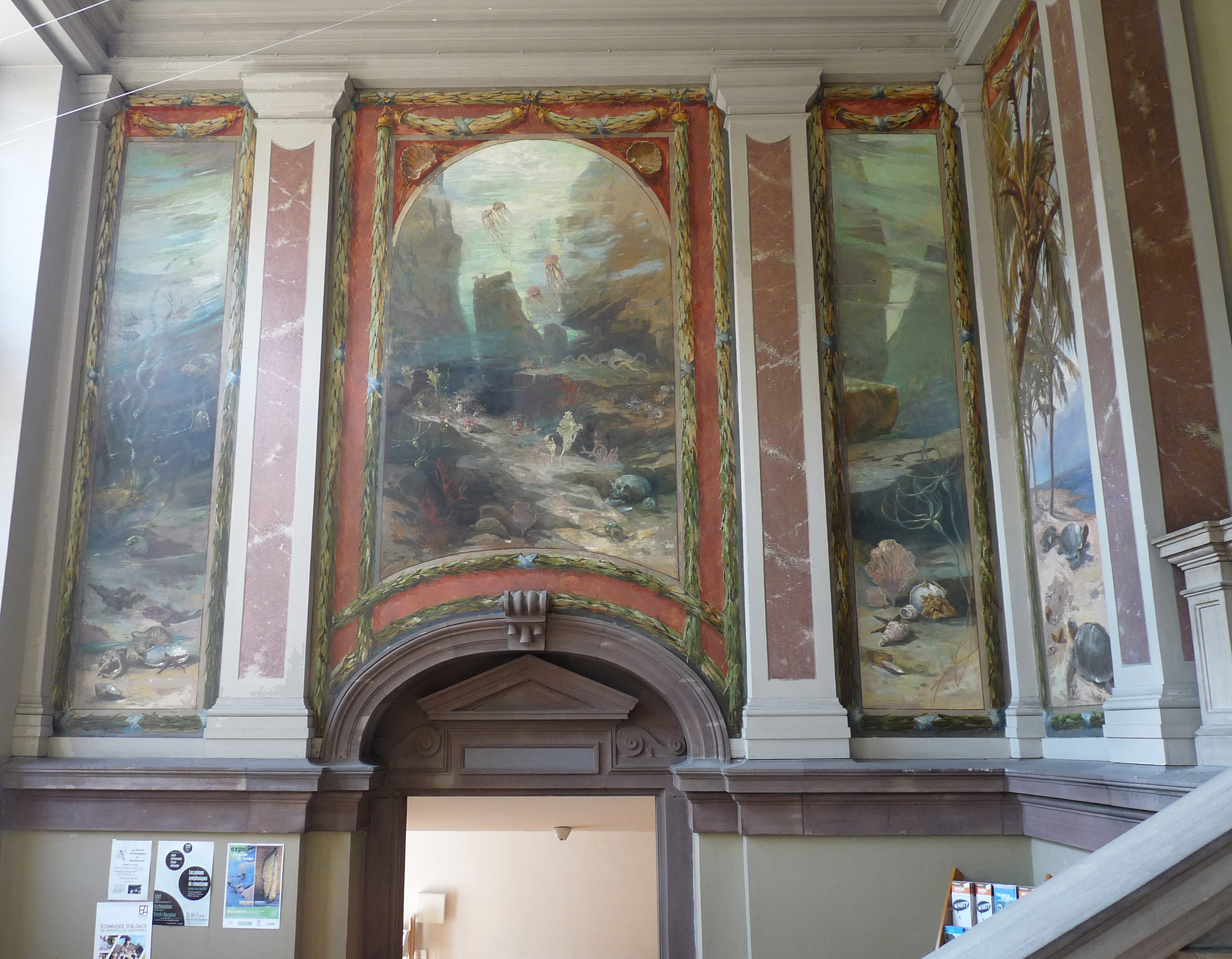
frescoes in the entrance hall

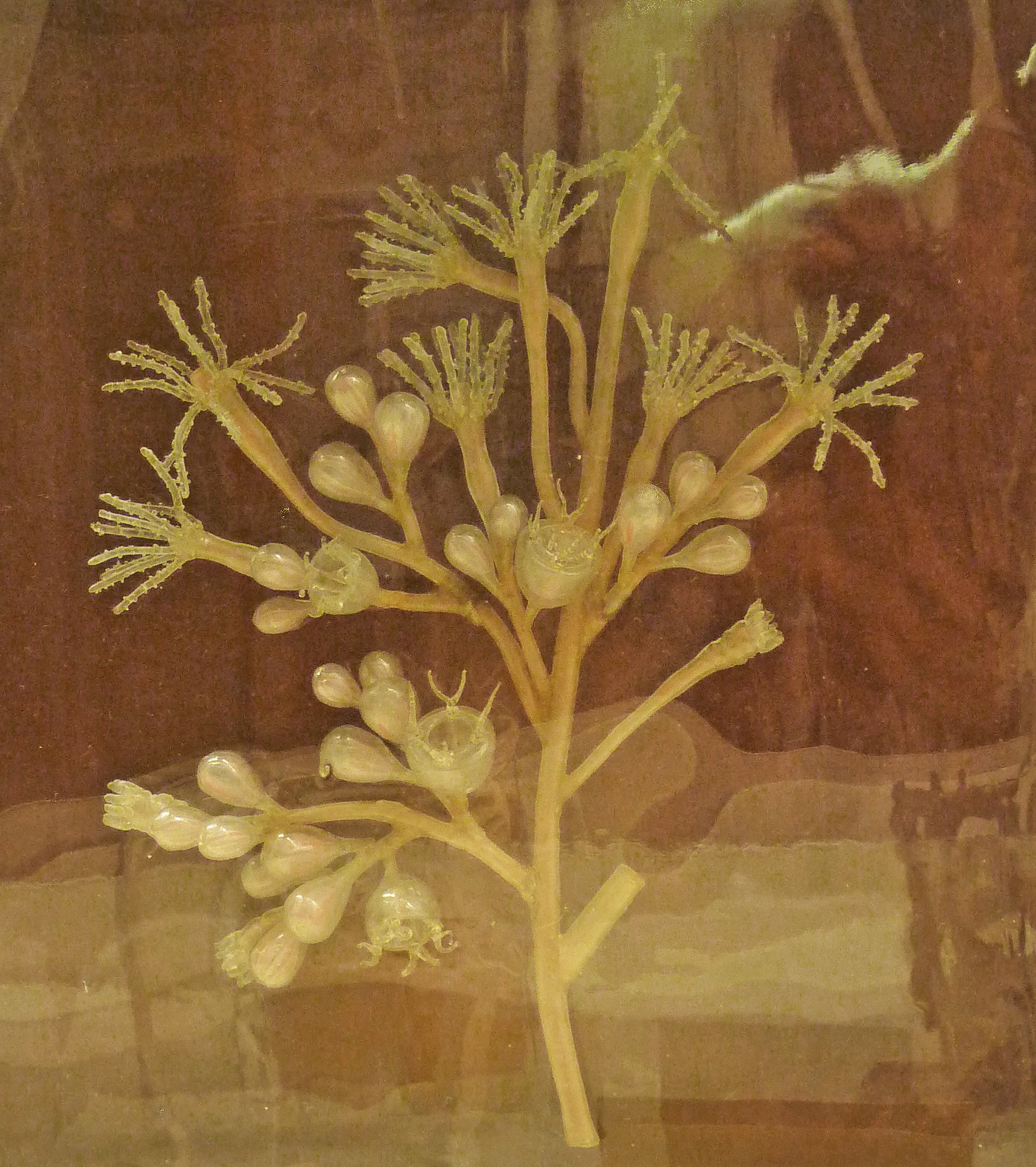
glass model by the Blaschka brothers

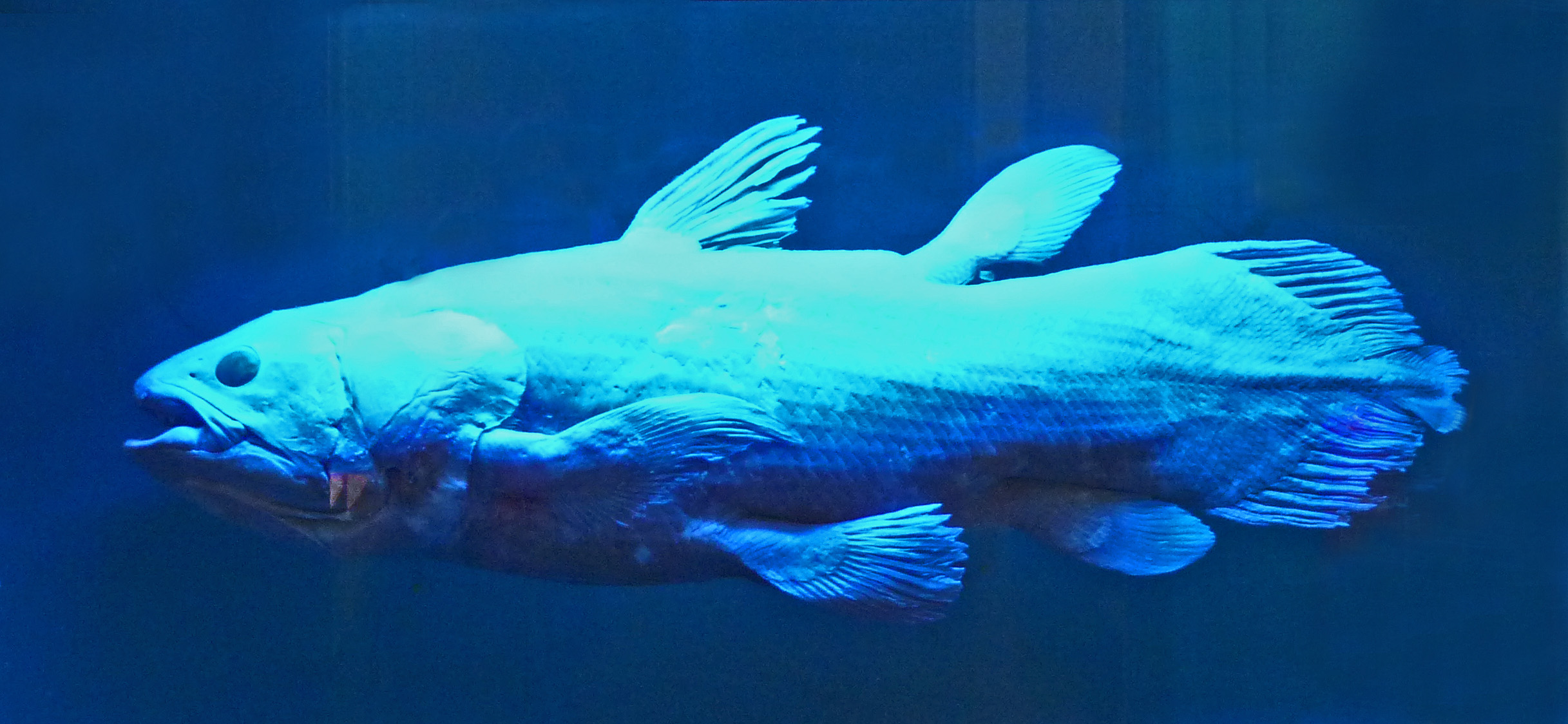
coelacanth specimen preserved in alcohol

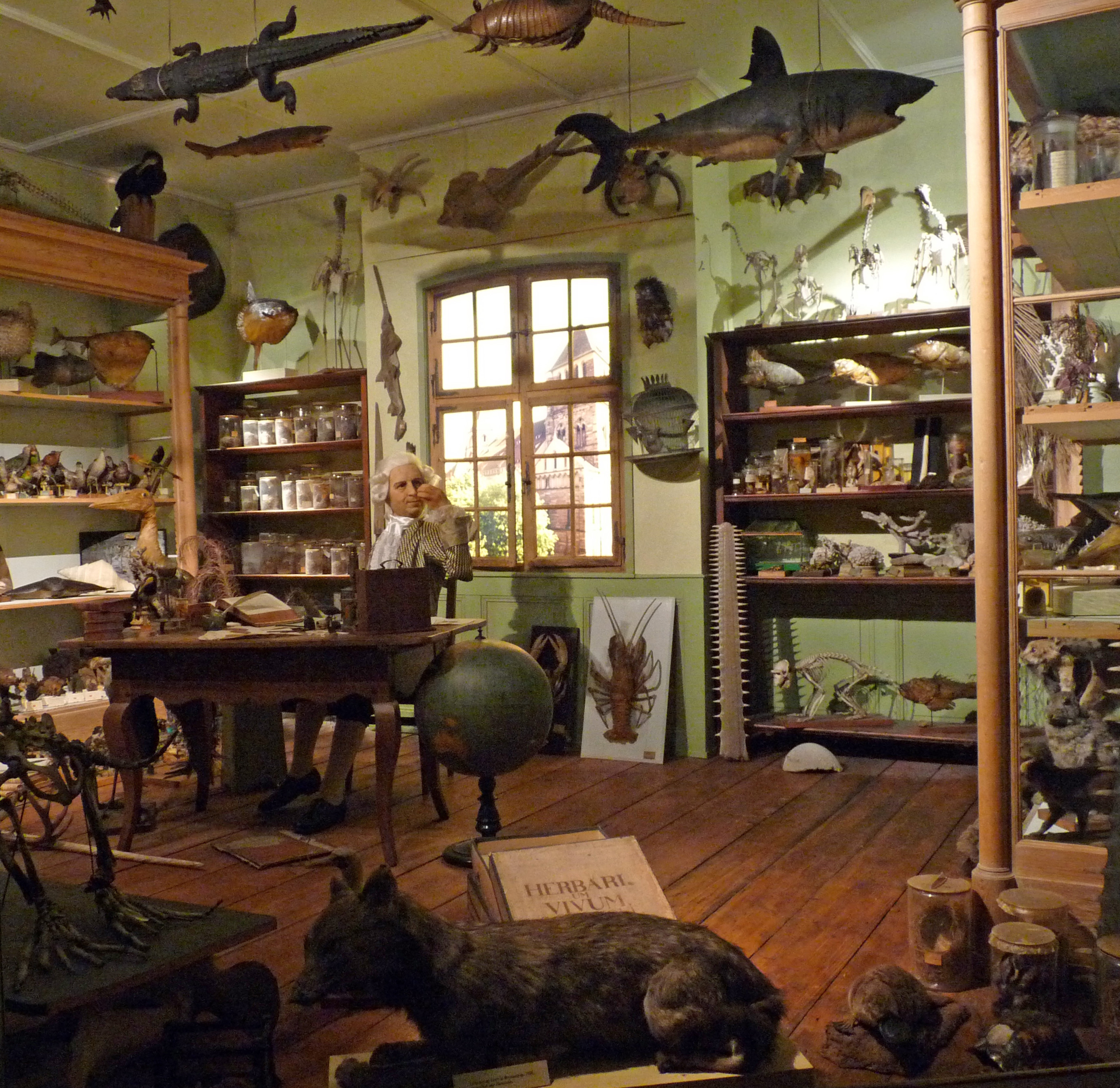
Reinvention of Hermann's cabinet in the 1980s

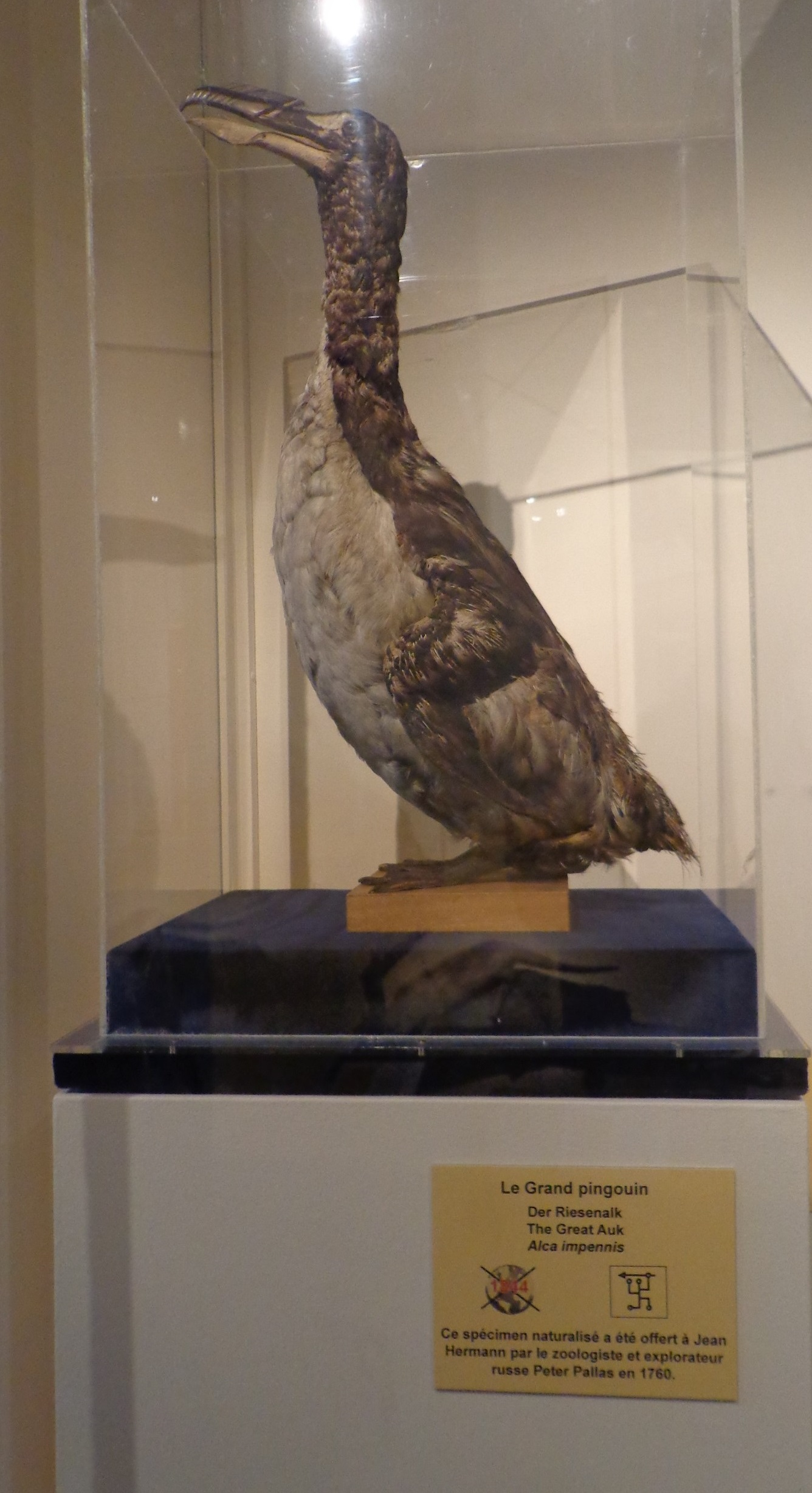
Great auk

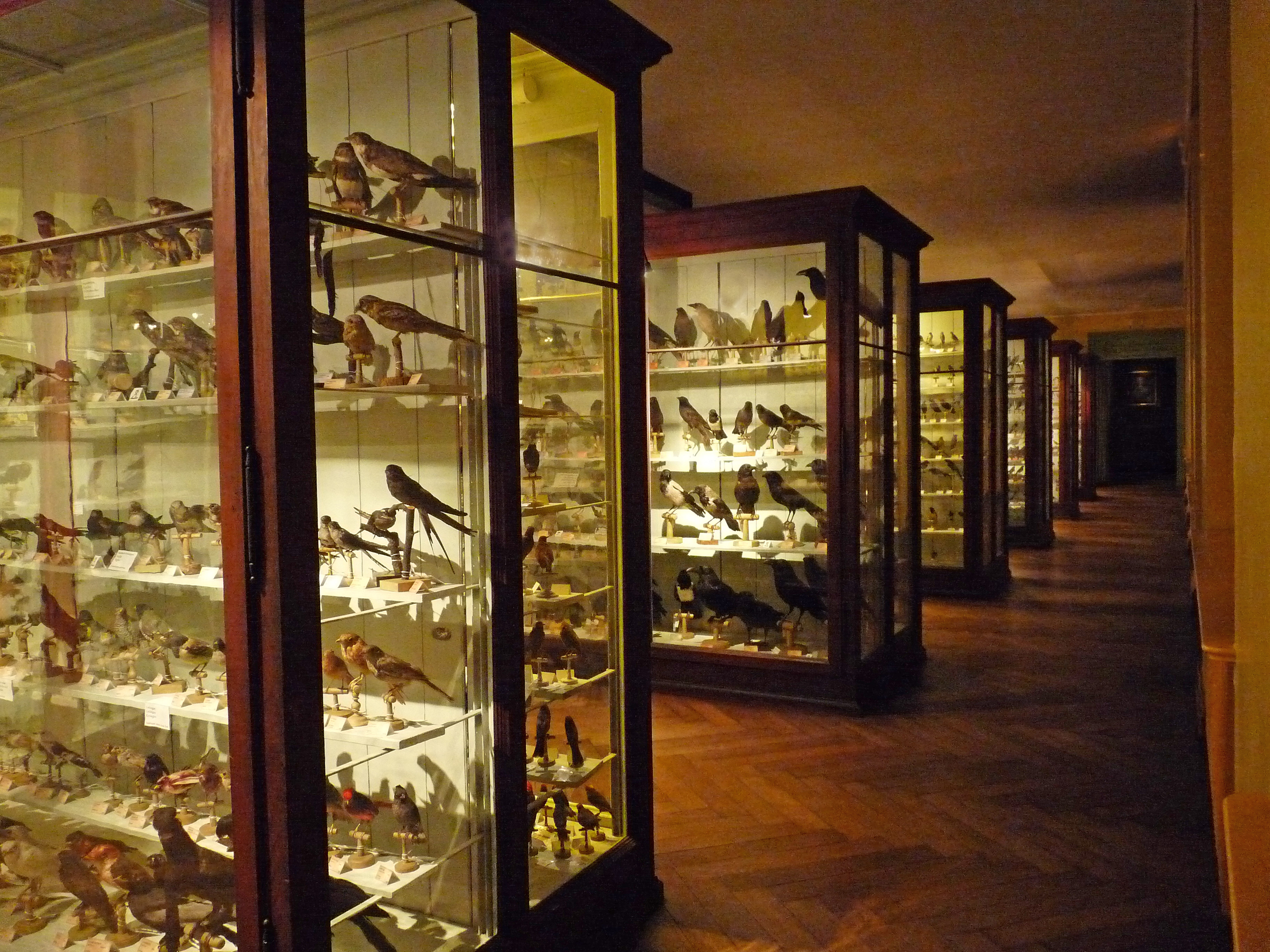
birds exhibit before renovation

== See also ==
- Ludwig Heinrich Philipp Döderlein
- Johann Hermann
- Natural History

== Bibliography ==
- Histoires naturelles : Les collections du Musée Zoologique de la Ville de Strasbourg, Éditions des Musées de la Ville de Strasbourg, February 2008, ISBN 978-2-35125-054-9
