= John Friedrich =

John Friedrich is the name of:

- John Friedrich (actor) (born 1958), American film actor
- John Friedrich (fraudster) (1950–1991), conman who worked Australia
- John Friedrich (luthier) (born 1858), German-born violin maker who worked in the United States

== See also ==
- Johannes Friedrich (disambiguation)
- John Frederick (disambiguation)
