= Refuge Jean-Frédéric Benevolo =

Coordinates: 45°30′56″N 7°4′59″E

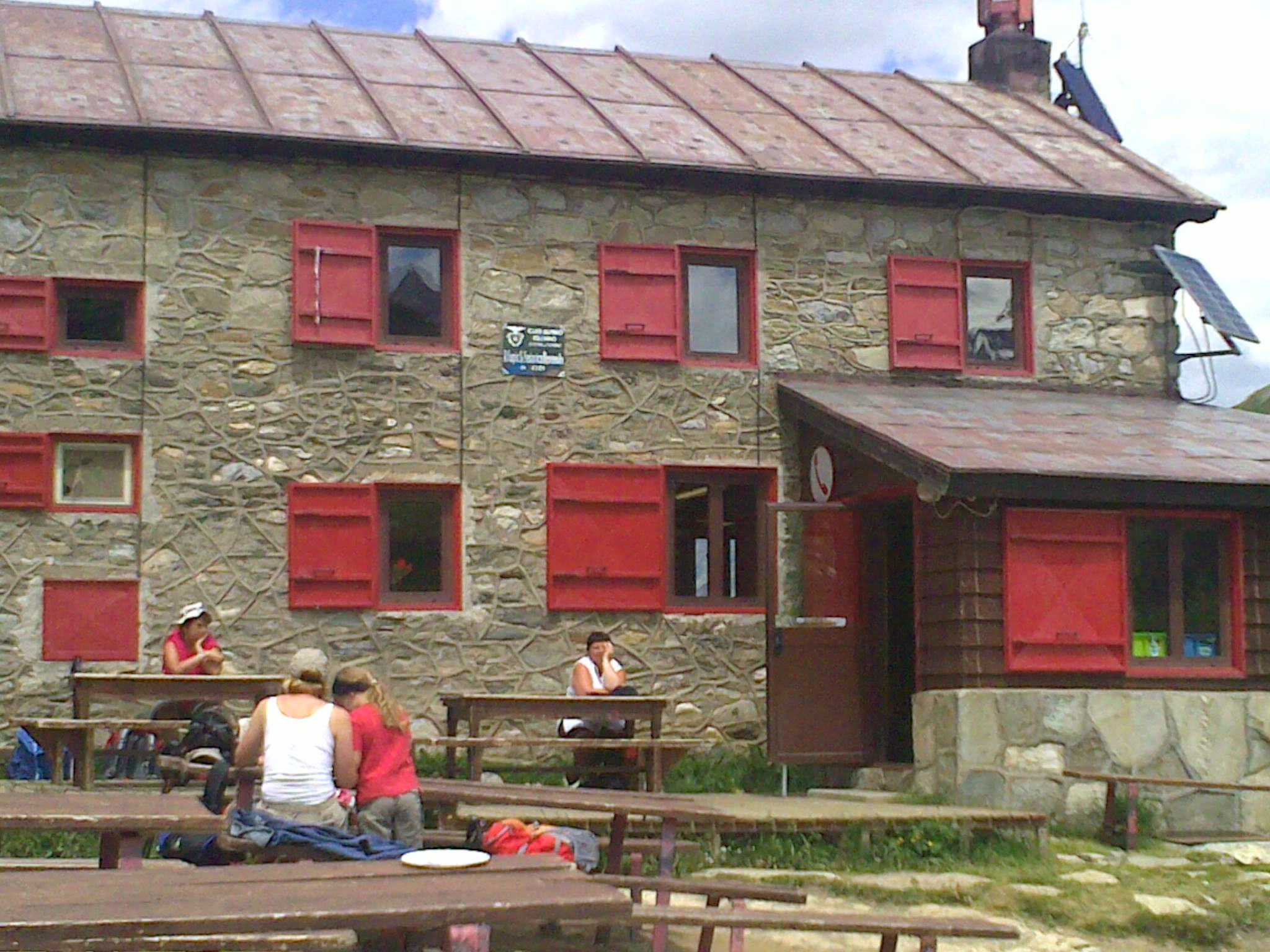
Refuge Gian Federico Benevolo in 2009, mountain hut in Aosta Valley

Refuge Gian Federico Benevolo is a refuge in the Alps in Aosta Valley, Italy. The setting at 2285m is beautiful, and within a six hours walk from Rifugio Citta di Chivasso to the East and Rifugio Bezzi to the West.
