= John Frederick (Australian cricketer) =

Australian cricketer

Personal information
- Born: 18 October 1910; Melbourne, Australia

Domestic team information
- Years: Team
- 1936-1937: Victoria
- Source: Cricinfo, 22 November 2015

John Frederick (born 18 October 1910, date of death unknown) was an Australian cricketer. He played three first-class cricket matches for Victoria between 1936 and 1937.

== See also ==
- List of Victoria first-class cricketers
