= Jean-Frédéric Hermann =

French physician and naturalist

- Born: 1768; Strasbourg
- Died: 1793 (aged 24–25)
- Known for: Mémoire aptérologique (treatise on wingless insects)
- Father: Jean Hermann
- Scientific career
- Fields: Entomology

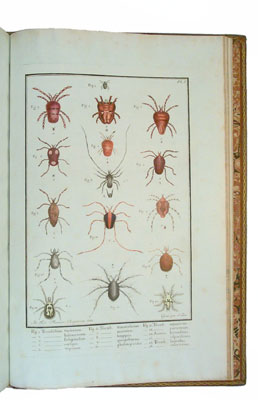
Plate from Mémoire aptérologique by Jean-Frédéric Hermann

Jean-Frédéric Hermann (Strasbourg 1768–1793) was a French physician and naturalist mainly interested in entomology.

Son of Jean Hermann, he continued the index of his father’s collection, illustrating some species. He studied the comparative anatomy of the mouthparts of insects and mites publishing Mémoire aptérologique with his son in law Frédéric-Louis Hammer in 1804.
