= Franz Heinrich Reusch =

German theologian (1825–1900)

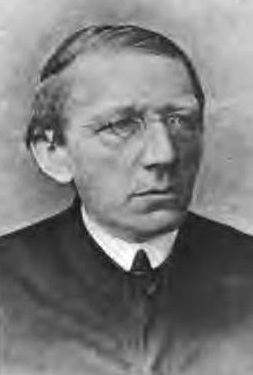
Franz Heinrich Reusch.

Franz Heinrich Reusch (4 December 1825 – 3 March 1900) was a German Old Catholic theologian who was excommunicated for his refusal to adopt certain church dogma.

He was born at Brilon, in Westphalia, studied general literature at Paderborn University, and theology at the University of Bonn, the University of Tübingen, and the Ludwig-Maximilians-Universität München. The friend and pupil of Döllinger, he took his degree of Doctor in Theology at the Ludwig-Maximilians-Universität München. He was ordained a priest in 1849 and was immediately made chaplain at Cologne. In 1854, he became Privatdozent in the exegesis of the Old Testament in the Catholic Theological Faculty at the University of Bonn; in 1858 he was made extraordinary, and in 1861 ordinary, professor of theology in the same university. From 1866 to 1877, he was editor of the Bonner Theologisches Literaturblatt.

In the controversies on the infallibility of the Pope, Reusch belonged to Döllinger's party, and he and his colleagues Bernhard Josef Hilgers, Franz Peter Knoodt and Joseph Langen were interdicted by the Archbishop of Cologne in 1871 from pursuing their courses of lectures. In 1872, he presided, in civilian clothes, over the grave of his follower Amalie von Lasaulx (Sr. Augustine) who had been defrocked for her Old Catholic beliefs.

In 1872, Reusch was excommunicated. For many years after this he held the post of Old Catholic curé of Bonn, as well as the position of vicar-general to the Old Catholic Bishop Reinkens, but resigned both in 1878, when, with Döllinger, he disapproved of the permission to marry granted by the Old Catholic Church in Germany to its clergy.

He retired into lay communion but continued to give lectures as usual in the Old Catholic Faculty of Theology at the University of Bonn, and to write on theological subjects. He was made rector of that university in 1873. In 1874 and 1875, he was the official reporter of the memorable Reunion Conferences held in Bonn in those years and attended by many distinguished theologians of the Oriental and Anglican communions. Reusch was a profound scholar and an untiring worker. Among his many works were contributions to the Revue internationale de theologie, a review started in Bern at the instance of the Old Catholic Congress in Lucerne. He wrote also works on the Old Testament; a pamphlet on Die Deutschen Bischöfe und der Aberglaube; and another on the falsifications to be found in the treatise of Aquinas against the Greeks; as well as essays on the history of the Society of Jesus, and a book of prayers.

His fame mainly rests on the works which he and Döllinger published jointly. These consisted of work on the Autobiography of Cardinal Bellarmine, the Geschichte der Moralstreitigkeiten in der Römisch-Katholischen Kirche seit dem XVI. Jahrhundert, and the Erörterungen über Leben und Schriften des hl. Liguori. During the last few years of his life, he was stricken with paralysis. He died in Bonn leaving behind a collection of letters to Bunsen about Roman cardinals and prelates, which has since been published.
