= Johann Nepomuk Huber =

German philosophical and theological writer

Johann Nepomuk Huber (18 August 1830 – 20 March 1879) was a German philosophical and theological writer, and a leader of the "Old Catholic Church".

== Life ==
He was born in Munich. Originally destined for the priesthood, he studied theology from childhood. The writings of Spinoza and Lorenz Oken attracted him to philosophy, and it was in philosophy that he habilitated (1854) at LMU Munich, where he ultimately became professor (extraordinarius, 1859; ordinarius, 1864).

With Ignaz von Döllinger and others, he attracted a large amount of public attention. Firstly, in 1869, by the challenge to the Ultramontane promoters of the First Vatican Council in the treatise Der Papst und das Koncil, which appeared under the pseudonym of "Janus". Secondly, in 1870, a series of letters (Römische Briefe, a redaction of secret reports sent from Rome during the sitting of the council), which were published under the pseudonym Quirinus in the Allgemeine Zeitung.

He died suddenly of heart disease in Munich.

== Works ==
- The treatise Über die Willensfreiheit (1858), followed in 1859 by Die Philosophie der Kirchenväter, which was promptly placed upon the Index, and led to the prohibition of all Catholic students from attending his lectures.
- Johannes Scotus Erigena (1861)
- Die Idee der Unsterblichkeit (1864)
- Studien (1867)
- Der Proletarier
- Zur Orientirung in der sozialen Frage (1865)
- Der Jesuitenorden nach seiner Verfassung und Doctrin, Wirksamkeit und Geschichte (1873), also placed upon the Index
- Der Pessimismus (1876)
- Die Forschung nach der Materie (1877)
- Zur Philosophie der Astronomie (1878)
- Das Gedächtnis (1878).

Huber also published adverse criticisms of Charles Darwin, David Strauss, Hartmann and Hackel; pamphlets on Des Papsttum und der Staat (1870), and Die Freiheiten der französischen Kirche (1871); and a volume of Kleine Schriften (1871).

He is mentioned in the Monty Python song Decomposing Composers.
