= Josef Hilgers =

German Jesuit writer

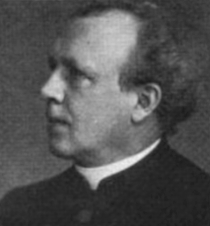
- Born: 9 September 1858; Kückhoven, Germany
- Died: 25 January 1918 (aged 59); Emmerich am Rhein, Germany
- Occupation: Theologian

Josef Hilgers (9 September 1858 – 25 January 1918) was a German Jesuit who wrote on theological and ascetical matters. He wrote two books on papal censorship of books and another on the nature of indulgences.

== Life ==
Josef Hilgers was born in Kückhoven on 9 September 1858. From 1885 to 1894 he taught in the city of Ordrupshoj, Denmark. Later he worked in Rome, Luxembourg, Valkenburg and finally in the Bonifatiushaus, in Emmerich, where he died 25 January 1918.

== Works (partial list) ==
- Die Kartäuser von London (The Carthusians of London), (1891).
- Bernardino Occhino von Siena (Bernardino Occhino of Siena), (1894).
- Der Index der verbotenen Bücher (The Index of Forbidden Books), (1904).
- Die Bücherverbote in Papstbriefen, (1907).
- Maria, der Weg zu Christus (Mary, the way to Christ), (1907).
- Das goldene Büchlein für Priester und Volk(The golden book for priests and people), (1910).
- Die katholische Lehre von den Ablässen und deren geschichtliche Entwicklung (The Catholic doctrine of indulgences and their historical development, (1913)
- An article on censorship in 16th century Italy in the March 1911 edition of Zentralblatt für Bibliothekswesen.
