= Joseph Langen =

German theologian and priest (1837–1901)

Joseph Langen (3 June 1837 – 13 July 1901) was a German theologian and priest, who was instrumental for the German Old Catholic movement.

Langen was born at Cologne, studied at Bonn, and was ordained priest for the Roman Catholic Church in 1859. He was nominated professor extraordinary at the University of Bonn in 1864, and a professor in ordinary of the exegesis of the New Testament in 1867—an office which he held until his death. He was one of the band of professors who in 1870 supported Döllinger in his resistance to the Vatican decrees, and was excommunicated along with Döllinger, Johann Nepomuk Huber, Johann Friedrich, Franz Heinrich Reusch, Joseph Hubert Reinkens and others, for refusing to accept them. In 1878, in consequence of the permission given to priests to marry, Langen ceased to identify himself with the Old Catholic movement, but was not reconciled with the Roman Catholic Church. His first work was an inquiry into the authorship of the Commentary on St Paul's Epistles and the Treatise on Biblical Questions, ascribed to Saint Ambrose and Augustine of Hippo respectively. In 1868 he published an Introduction to the New Testament.

He also published works on the Last Days of the Life of Jesus, on Judaism in the Time of Christ, on John of Damascus (1879) and an Examination of the Vatican Dogma in the Light of Patristic Exegesis of the New Testament. But he is chiefly famous for his Geschichte der Römischen Kirche (History of the Church of Rome to the Pontificate of Innocent III) (4 vols, 1881–1893), a work of sound scholarship, based directly upon the authorities, the most important sources being woven carefully into the text. He also contributed largely to the internationale theologische Zeitschrift, a review started in 1893 by the Old Catholics to promote the union of several National Churches on the basis of the councils of the Undivided Church, and admitting articles in German, French and English.

Among other subjects, he wrote on the School of Hierotheus, on Romish falsifications of the Greek Fathers, on Pope Leo XIII, on Liberal Ultramontanism, on the Papal Teaching in regard to Morals, on Vincent of Lerins and he carried on a controversy with Professor Willibald Beyschlag, of the German Evangelical Church, on the respective merits of Protestantism and Old Catholicism regarded as a basis for teaching the Christian faith. An attack of apoplexy put an end to his teaching career and hastened his death. He died in Bonn.
