= Ignaz von Döllinger =

German Catholic priest, theologian and historian (1799–1890)

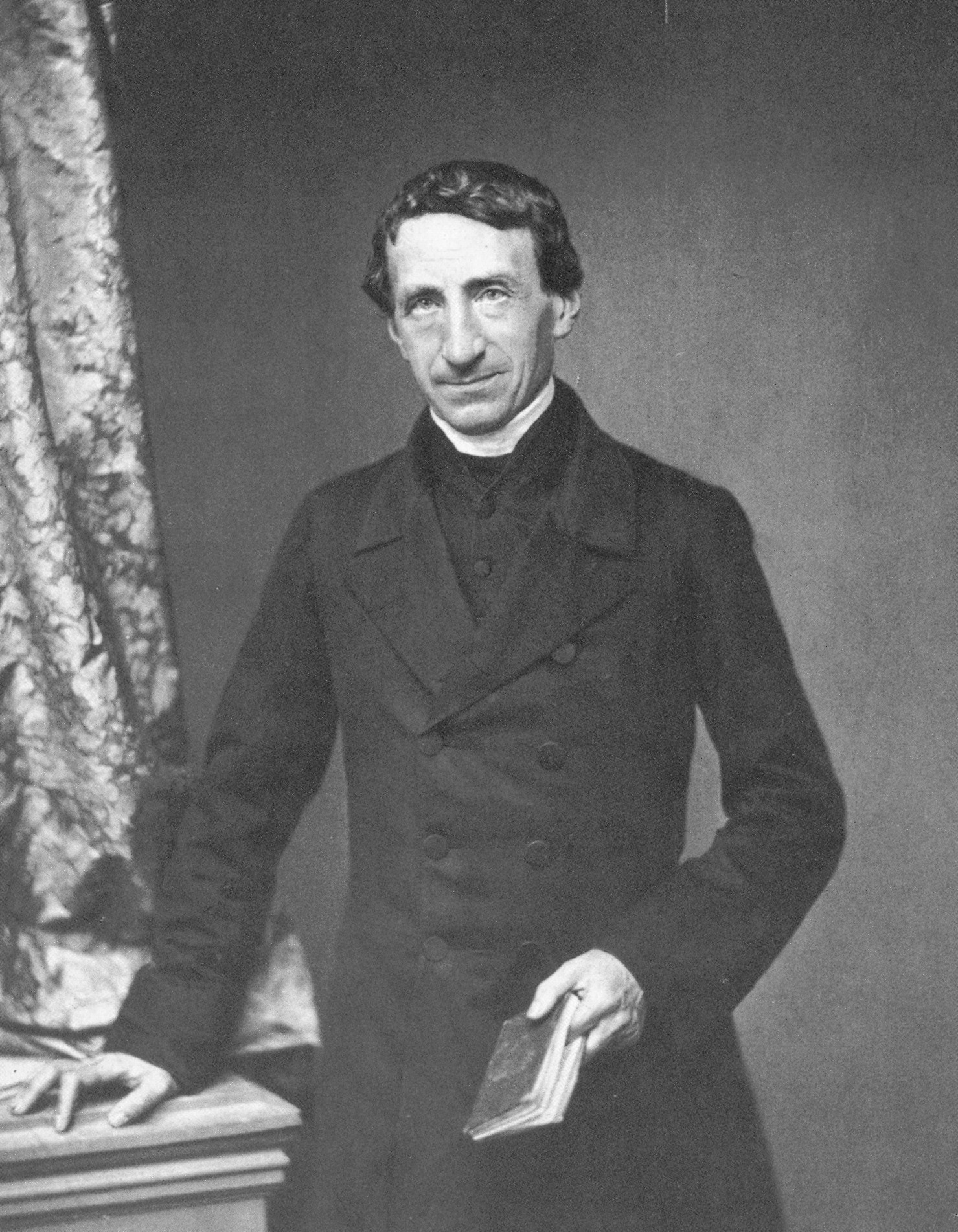
- Ignaz von Döllinger, ca. 1860.
- Born: 28 February 1799; Bamberg, Electorate of Bavaria, Holy Roman Empire
- Died: 14 January 1890 (aged 90); Munich, Kingdom of Bavaria, German Empire
- Education: University of Würzburg
- Occupation: Theologian
- Religion: Roman Catholic, Independent Catholic
- Ordained: 5 April 1822

Johann Joseph Ignaz von Döllinger (German: [ˈɪɡnaːts fɔn ˈdœlɪŋɐ]; 28 February 1799 – 14 January 1890), also Doellinger in English, was a German theologian, Catholic priest and church historian who rejected the dogma of papal infallibility. Among his writings which proved controversial, his criticism of the papacy antagonized ultramontanes, yet his reverence for tradition annoyed the liberals.

He is considered an important contributor to the doctrine, growth and development of the Old Catholic Church, though he himself never joined that denomination.

== Early life ==
Born at Bamberg, Bavaria, Döllinger came from an intellectual family, his grandfather and father having both been eminent physicians and professors of medical science; his mother's family were equally accomplished. Döllinger was first educated in the gymnasium at Würzburg, where he learned Italian. A Benedictine monk taught him English privately. He began to study philosophy at the University of Würzburg, where his father held a professorship. In 1817, he added philology, and, in 1818, turned to theology. He learned Spanish at the university. He particularly devoted himself to church history. In 1820, he became acquainted with Victor Aimé Huber (1800–1869), who was to influence him greatly.

== Career ==
After studying at the seminary in Bamberg, on 5 April 1822 he was ordained a Roman Catholic priest for the Diocese of Bamberg, and in November, was appointed chaplain at Markscheinfeldt in Middle Franconia. In 1823 he became professor of church history and canon law in the lyceum at Aschaffenburg. He then took his doctoral degree, and in 1826 became professor of theology at the Ludwig-Maximilians-Universität München (LMU Munich), where he spent the rest of his life. About this time he brought upon himself the criticism of Heinrich Heine, who was then editor of a Munich paper. The unsparing satirist described the professor's face as the "gloomiest" in the whole procession of clerics on Good Friday.

In 1836, Döllinger made his first visit to England, and met a number of leading English intellectuals, including John Henry Newman and William Gladstone, with whom he maintained lifelong contact. For many years, a number of young Englishmen boarded with him in Munich; among them was Lord Acton. Acton had been denied entry to the University of Cambridge because he was a Catholic, and subsequently went to Munich where he studied at the LMU. They became lifelong friends. Döllinger inspired in him a deep love of historical research and its function as a critical instrument.

In 1837, he was made member extraordinary of the Royal Bavarian Academy of Sciences, in 1843 as a regular member, and, from 1860, he was secretary of its historical section. In 1845, Döllinger was made representative of his university in the second chamber of the Bavarian legislature. In 1839, the king had given him a canonry in the royal chapel of St. Cajetan in Munich. On 1 January 1847, he was made mitred provost of that body of canons. However, that same year he was dismissed from his chair, in punishment of his protest as representative of the university on the Bavarian Landtag, to which he had been appointed in 1844, against the dismissal of several university professors.

In 1849, Döllinger was offered the chair of church history. In 1848, when nearly every throne in Europe was shaken by the spread of revolutionary sentiments, he was elected delegate to the national German assembly at Frankfurt. He spoke boldly in favour of freedom for the church to manage her affairs without state interference. In 1857, Döllinger and Acton traveled to Rome, where they were both disenchanted with Pius IX's papacy. Döllinger was troubled that the Pope was the head of state of the Papal States. In some speeches at Munich in 1861, he declared his view that the Roman Catholic Church did not need a temporal sovereign. His book on The Church and the Churches (Munich, 1861) dealt to a certain extent with the same question. In 1863, he invited 100 theologians to meet at Mechelen and discuss the question which the liberals Lamennais and Lacordaire had raised in France, namely, the attitude that should be assumed by the Roman Catholic Church towards modern ideas. In his address, "On the Past and Future of Catholic Theology," Döllinger advocated for greater academic freedom.

== Views ==
=== Protestantism ===
On the other hand, Döllinger published a treatise in 1838 against mixed marriages, and in 1843 wrote strongly in favour of requiring Protestant soldiers to kneel at the consecration of the Host when compelled officially to be present at Mass. Moreover, in his works on The Reformation (3 volumes Regensburg, 1846–1848) and on Luther (1851, Eng, tr., 1853) he severely criticizes Protestant leaders and propagates Ultramontane views. Meanwhile, he had been well received in England; and he afterwards travelled in the Netherlands, Belgium and France, acquainting himself with the condition and prospects of the Roman Catholic Church. His correspondence with leaders of the Tractarian movement in England, beginning in 1842, are preserved. When one of them, James Hope-Scott, converted to Roman Catholicism, Döllinger congratulated him warmly.

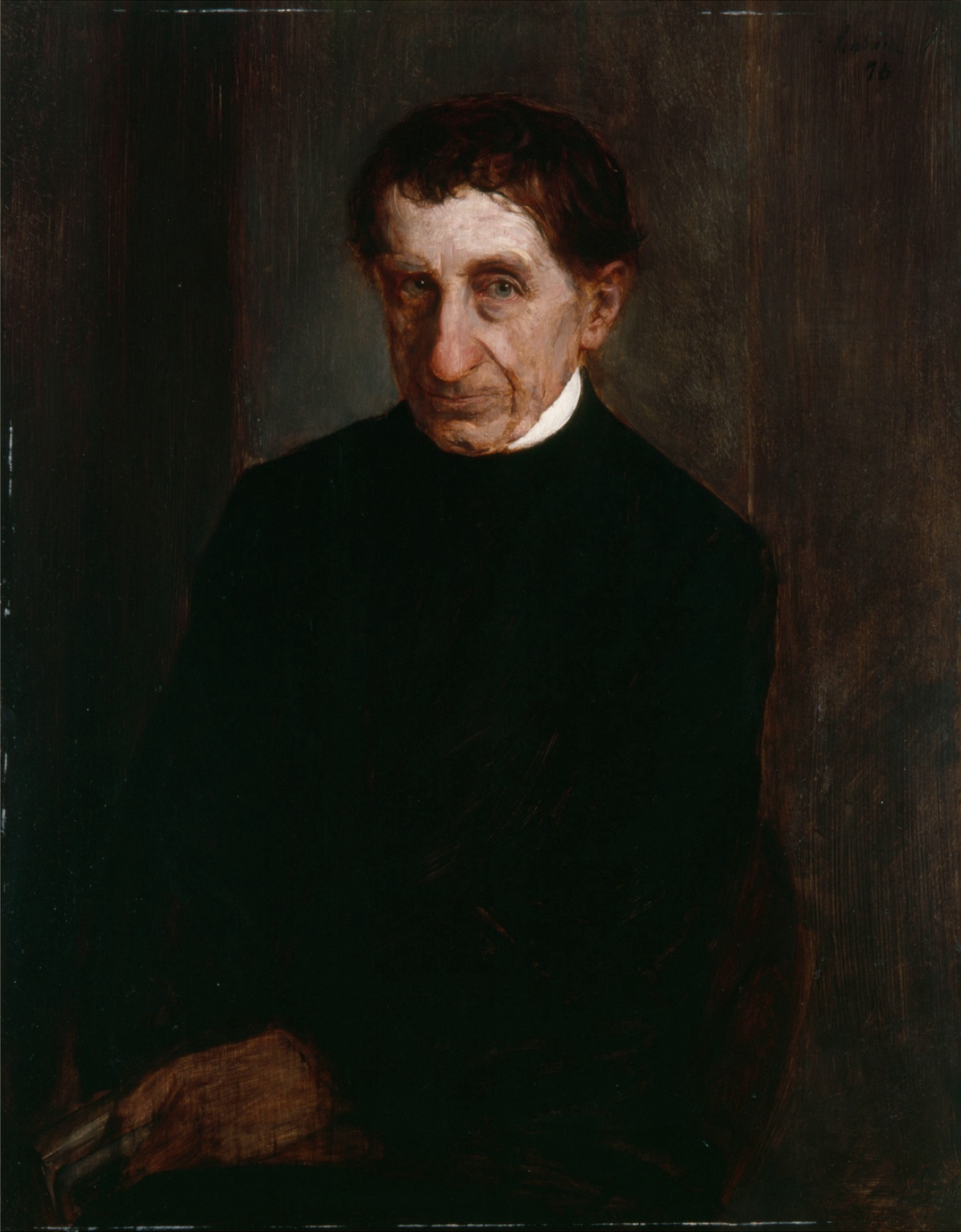
Portrait of Döllinger, by Franz von Lenbach, 1878.

=== Judaism ===
"The Jewish people moved in a circle of religious ideas only part of which were expressed in its sacred literature ... Far from being a dead letter in the hands of a people living in spiritual stagnation, [the Jews] were instinctually endowed with the power and the impulse to develop organically and steadily", wrote Döllinger. This favorable reference to the vigorous 'spirit' of Judaism runs counter to common critiques of the religion by 19th century theologians.

== Liberalism ==
Early in his professorial career at Munich, Jesuits criticized his manner of teaching of church history. But Adam Möhler defended Döllinger, and they later became friends. Döllinger was in touch with the well-known French Liberal Catholic Lamennais, whose views on the reconciliation of the Roman Catholic Church with the principles of modern society (liberalism) and the French Revolution had aroused much suspicion in Ultramontane circles, which were close to Jesuit. In 1832, Lammenais and his friends Lacordaire and Montalembert, visited Germany, obtaining considerable sympathy in their attempts to bring about a modification of the Roman Catholic attitude to modern problems and liberal political principles.

=== Papal authority ===
Döllinger's stance on the papacy changed in the course of his life. Ultimately, he energetically opposed any addition to, or more stringent definition of, the powers of the pope. He spoke about his convictions, among other places, at a Catholic congress at Mechelen. Pius IX ordered the assembly closed after four days of debate. In response to Döllinger and others, Pius IX issued the famous Syllabus Errorum in 1864, harshly criticizing liberalism and scientism.

=== Vatican Council and the Munich conference ===
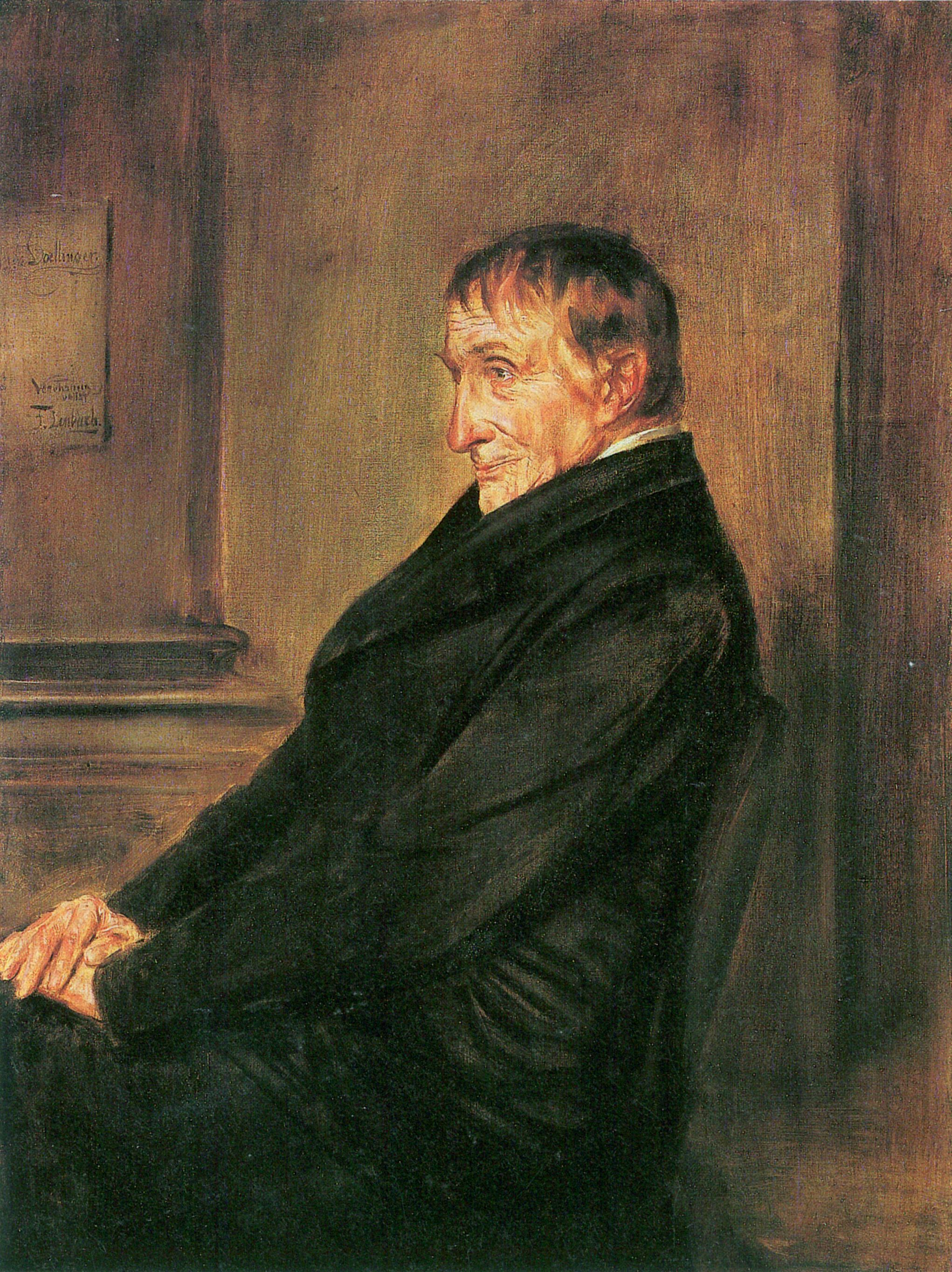
Portrait of Döllinger, by Franz von Lenbach, 1892.

Leading Catholic theologians advised Pius IX to declare Papal infallibility a dogma. There was not, however, universal consensus on the subject. Some bishops, while not opposed, considered its promulgation to be inopportune. The headquarters of the opposition was Germany, and its leader was Döllinger. Among his supporters were his close friends Johann Friedrich and J. N. Huber, in Bavaria. In the rest of Germany, Döllinger was supported by theology professors at Bonn, including the canonist Johann Friedrich von Schulte, Franz Heinrich Reusch, Joseph Langen, Joseph Hubert Reinkens, and other distinguished scholars. In Switzerland, Eduard Herzog and others supported the movement.

Early in 1869, Döllinger's Letters of Janus (written in conjunction with Huber and Friedrich) began to appear. They were at once translated into English. They disparaged the Syllabus and its incompatibility with modern thought. They argued that the concept of papal infallibility was intellectually indefensible, although their interpretation differed from what conservatives had proposed.

During the council, which convened on 8 December 1869, Augustin Theiner, the librarian at the Vatican, not in favor with the pope for his outspoken liberalism, kept his German friends informed of the course of the discussions. The Letters of Quirinus, written by Döllinger and Huber concerning the proceedings appeared in the German newspapers, and an English translation was published by Charles Rivington. The proceedings of the council were frequently stormy, and the opponents of the dogma of infallibility complained that they were interrupted, and that endeavours were made to put them down by clamour. The dogma was at length carried by an overwhelming majority, and the dissentient bishops, who – with the exception of two – had left the council before the final division, one by one submitted.

Döllinger headed a protest by forty-four professors at the Ludwig-Maximilians-Universität München (LMU), and gathered together a congress at Munich, which met in August 1870 and issued a declaration adverse to the Vatican decrees. In Bavaria, where Döllinger's influence was greatest, a strong determination to resist the resolutions of the council prevailed. But the authority of the council was held by the archbishop of Munich to be paramount, and he called upon Döllinger to submit. Döllinger addressed a memorable letter to the archbishop in 1871, refusing to follow his advice. "As a Christian, as a theologian, as an historian, and as a citizen," he added, "I cannot accept this doctrine."

== Excommunication ==
On 18 April 1871, Gregor von Scherr, Archbishop of Munich and Freising, excommunicated Döllinger. On 29 February 1871, Döllinger was elected rector-magnificus of the Ludwig-Maximilians-Universität München (LMU) by a vote of 54 to six. Several other universities conferred an honorary degree on him: Doctor of Civil Law, University of Oxford, 1871; Doctor of Laws, University of Edinburgh, 1872; Doctor of Law, University of Marburg; Doctor of Philosophy, University of Vienna.

The dissident Bavarian clergy invited Bishop Loos of the Old Catholic Church of the Netherlands, which for more than 150 years had existed independent of the Papacy, to administer the sacrament of Confirmation in Bavaria. The offer was accepted, and the bishop was received with triumphal arches and other demonstrations of joy by a part of the Bavarian Catholics. The three Dutch Old Catholic bishops declared themselves ready to consecrate a "non-infallibilist" bishop for Bavaria, if it were desired. The question was discussed at a meeting of the opponents of the Vatican Council's doctrine, and it was resolved to elect a bishop and ask the Dutch Old-Order bishops to consecrate him. Döllinger, however, voted against the proposition, and withdrew from any further steps towards the promotion of this movement.

== The Old Catholic Church ==
Döllinger's refusal lost Bavaria to the movement; and the number of Bavarian sympathizers was still further reduced when the seceders, in 1878, allowed their priests to marry, a decision which Döllinger, as was known, sincerely regretted. The Old Catholic Communion, however, was formally constituted, with Joseph Hubert Reinkens at its head as bishop, and it still continues to exist in Germany as a whole and, more marginally, in Bavaria.

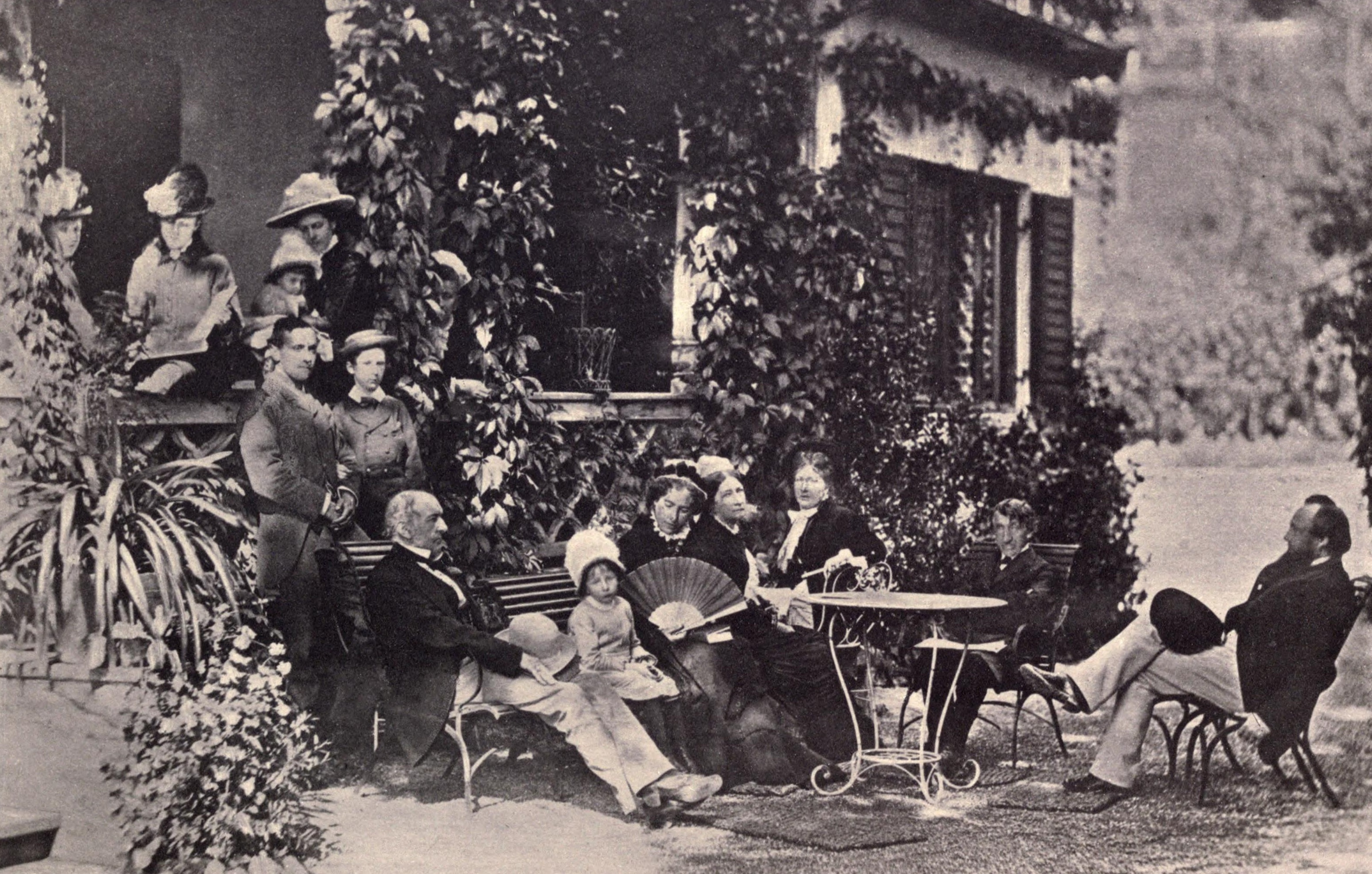
Döllinger, with Lord Acton and William Gladstone, 1879.

Döllinger's attitude to the new community was not very clearly defined. "I do not wish to join a schismatic society; I am isolated." Döllinger's regularly insisted, his church remained the ancient Catholic Church, "the one holy catholic and apostolic church."

== Reunion conferences ==
His addresses on the reunion of the churches, delivered at the Bonn Conference of 1872, show that he was by no means hostile towards the newly formed Old Catholic communion, in whose interests these conferences were held. In 1874 and again in 1875, he presided over the reunion conferences held at Bonn and attended by leading ecclesiastics from the British Isles and from the Oriental non-Roman churches, among whom were Bishop Christopher Wordsworth of Lincoln; Bishop Harold Browne of Ely; Lord Plunket, Archbishop of Dublin; Lycurgus, Greek Orthodox Archbishop of Syros and Tenos; Canon Liddon; and the Russian Orthodox professor Ossmnine of Saint Petersburg. At the latter of these two conferences, when Döllinger was 76 years of age, he delivered a series of addresses in German and English in which he discussed the state of theology on the continent, the reunion question and the religious condition of the various countries of Europe in which the Roman Catholic Church held sway. Not the least of his achievements on this occasion was the successful attempt, made with extraordinary tact, ability, knowledge and perseverance, to induce the Orientals, Anglicans and Old Catholics present to accept a formula of concord drawn from the writings of the leading theologians of the Greek Church on the long-vexed question of the procession of the Holy Spirit.

== Scholarship in retirement ==
This result having been attained, he passed the rest of his days in retirement, emerging sometimes from his retreat to give addresses on theological questions, and also writing, in conjunction with his friend Reusch, his last book, Geschichte der Moralstreitigkeiten in der römisch-katholischen Kirche seit dem sechszehnten Jahrhundert mit Beiträgen zur Geschichte und Charakteristik des Jesuitenordens (Nördlingen, 1889), in which he deals with the moral theology of Alphonsus Liguori. He died in Munich at the age of ninety-one. Even in articulo mortis he refused to receive the sacraments from the parish priest at the cost of submission, but the last offices were performed by his friend Professor Friedrich. He is buried in the Alter Südfriedhof in Munich.

== Works ==
- The Eucharist in the First Three Centuries (Mainz, 1826)
- A Church History (1836, Eng. trans. 1840)
- Hippolytus and Callistus (1854, Eng. trans., 1876)
- First Age of Christianity (1860)
- Lectures on the Reunion of the Churches
- The Vatican Decrees
- Studies in European History (tr. M. Warre, 1890)
- Miscellaneous Addresses (tr. M. Warre, 1894)

=== Bibliography ===
- Georg Denzler / Ernst Ludwig Grasmück (Eds.): Geschichtlichkeit und Glaube. Zum 100. Todestag Johann Joseph Ignaz von Döllingers (1799–1890). Munich Erich Wewel Verlag, 1990, ISBN 978-3-87904-173-2
- Stefan Leonhardt: "Zwei schlechthin unausgleichbare Auffassungen des Mittelpunktes der christliche Religion". Ignaz Döllingers Auseinandersetzung mit der Reformation, ihrer Lehre und deren Folgen in seiner ersten Schaffensperiode. Goettingen Edition Ruprecht, 2nd edition 2008; ISBN 978-3-7675-7096-2
- Life by Johann Friedrich (3 volumes 1899–1901)
- Obituary notice in The Times, 11 January 1890
- L. von Kobell, Conversations of Dr Döllinger (tr. by K Gould, 1892)
