= Johann Friedrich (theologian) =

German theologian (1836–1917)

Johann Friedrich (5 May 1836, Poxdorf, Germany – 19 August 1917, Munich, Germany) was a German theologian. He was prominent as a leader of the Old Catholics.

== Biography ==
He was born at Poxdorf in Upper Franconia, and was educated at Bamberg and at the Ludwig-Maximilians-Universität München. He was ordained a Catholic priest in 1859. In 1865, he was appointed extraordinary professor of theology. In 1867, he was appointed to the Academy of Sciences. He was a pupil of Ignaz von Döllinger.

In 1869, he went to the Vatican Council as secretary to Cardinal Hohenlohe, and took an active part in opposing the dogma of papal infallibility, notably by supplying the opposition bishops with historical and theological material. He left Rome before the council closed.

"No German ecclesiastic of his age appears to have won for himself so unusual a repute as a theologian and to have held so important a position, as the trusted counsellor of the leading German cardinal at the Vatican Council. The path was fairly open before him to the highest advancement in the Church of Rome, yet he deliberately sacrificed all such hopes and placed himself in the van of a hard and doubtful struggle" (The Guardian, 1872, p. 1004).

A sentence of excommunication was passed on Friedrich in April 1871, but he refused to acknowledge it and was upheld by the Bavarian government. He continued to perform ecclesiastical functions and maintained his academic position, becoming an ordinary professor in 1872. In 1874, he inaugurated the Old Catholic theological faculty at the University of Bern and lectured there for a year. In Bavaria, in 1882, the Minister of Public Worship, yielding to ultramontane pressure, transferred him from his chair in theology to the philosophical faculty as professor of history. By this time he had to some extent withdrawn from the advanced position which he at first occupied in organizing the Old Catholic Church, for he was not in agreement with its abolition of enforced celibacy. He died in Munich.

== Works ==
Friedrich was a prolific writer; among his chief works are:

- Johann Wessel: Ein Bild aus der Kirchengeschichte des XV. Jahrhunderts, 1862 ("Wessel Gansfort; a portrait of church history in the 15th century")
- Die Lehre des Johann Hus, 1862 ("The teachings of John Hus")
- Kirchengeschichte Deutschlands, 2 volumes, 1867–69 ("German church history")
- Tagebuch während des Vaticanischen Concils geführt, 1871 ("Journal of the Vatican Council")
- Documenta ad Illustrandum Concilium Vaticanum, 1871
- Beiträge zur Kirchengeschichte des 18. Jahrhunderts, 1876 ("Contribution to church history of the 18th century")
- Der Mechanismus der vatikanischen Religion, 1876 ("The mechanism of the Vatican religion")
- Geschichte des Vatikanischen Konzils, 2 volumes, 1877–86 ("History of the Vatican Council")
- Das Papsttum, 1892 ("The papacy")
- Johann Adam Möhler, der Symboliker, 1894 ("On Johann Adam Möhler")
- Ignaz von Döllinger: Sein Leben auf Grund seines schriftlichen Nachlasses, 3 volumes, 1899–1901 ("Ignaz von Dollinger; his life on the basis of his literary estate")
