= Johann Nepomuk =

Johann Nepomuk, a German-language name of Saint John of Nepomuk, can be used as a given name. Notable people with the name include:

- Johann Nepomuk August Wittasek
- Johann Nepomuk Beck
- Johann Nepomuk Berger
- Johann Nepomuk Berger (politician)
- Johann Nepomuk Brischar
- Johann Nepomuk Cosmas Michael Denis
- Johann Nepomuk Czermak
- Johann Nepomuk David
- Johann Nepomuk Ehrlich
- Johann Nepomuk Ender
- Johann Nepomuk Fischer
- Johann Nepomuk Fuchs (disambiguation)
- Johann Nepomuk Geiger
- Johann Nepomuk Gobert d'Aspremont-Lynden
- Johann Nepomuk Hauser
- Johann Nepomuk Hiedler
- Johann Nepomuk Hoechle
- Johann Nepomuk Hofzinser
- Johann Nepomuk Hradeczky
- Johann Nepomuk Huber
- Johann Nepomuk Hummel
- Johann Nepomuk Isfordink
- Johann Nepomuk Janatka
- Johann Nepomuk Kalcher
- Johann Nepomuk Karl, Prince of Liechtenstein
- Johann Nepomuk Krieger
- Johann Nepomuk Locherer
- Johann Nepomuk Maelzel
- Johann Nepomuk Nestroy
- Johann Nepomuk Oischinger
- Johann Nepomuk Prix
- Johann Nepomuk Rust
- Johann Nepomuk Schaller
- Johann Nepomuk Schelble
- Johann Nepomuk Schnabl
- Johann Nepomuk Schödlberger
- Johann Nepomuk Schönberg
- Johann Nepomuk Sepp
- Johann Nepomuk Stadler
- Johann Nepomuk Wilczek
- Johann Nepomuk della Croce
- Johann Nepomuk von Fuchs
- Johann Nepomuk von Kutschera
- Johann Nepomuk von Laicharting
- Johann Nepomuk von Lobkowicz
- Johann Nepomuk von Nostitz-Rieneck
- Johann Nepomuk von Nussbaum
- Johann Nepomuk von Poißl
- Johann Nepomuk von Ringseis
- Johann Nepomuk von Triva
- Johann Nepomuk von Tschiderer zu Gleifheim

== See also ==
- Johannes von Nepomuk Franz Xaver Gistel, German naturalist
- Jan Nepomucen, Polish version of the given name
- Juan Nepomuceno, Spanish version of the given name
- Giovanni Nepomuceno, Italian version of the given name
- Nepomucký, includes the Czech version of the given name
