= Jan Nepomuk =

Jan Nepomuk, the Czech-language name of Saint John of Nepomuk, can be used as a masculine given name. A similar Czech name is Jan Nepomucký. Notable people with the name include:

- Jan Nepomuk Maýr
- Jan Nepomuk Škroup
- Jan Nepomuk Štěpánek
- Jan Nepomuk Woldřich

== See also ==
- Jan Nepomucen, Polish version of the given name
- Johann Nepomuk, German version of the given name
- Juan Nepomuceno, Spanish version of the given name
- Giovanni Nepomuceno, Italian version of the given name
