= Coat of arms of the Niño family =

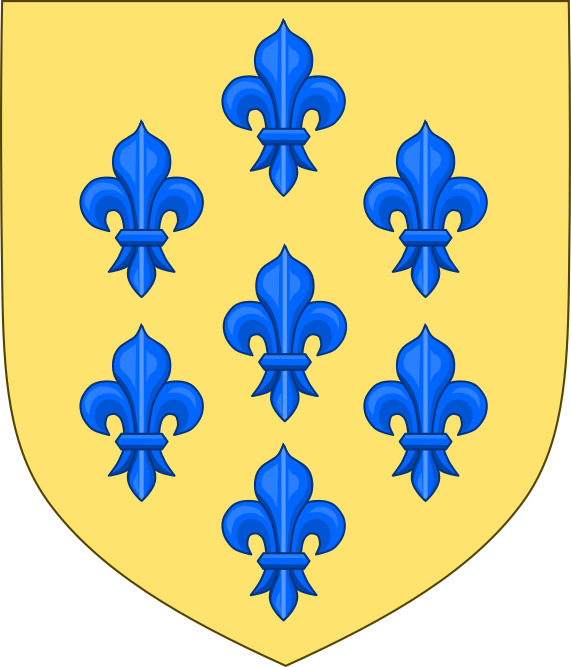

Versions
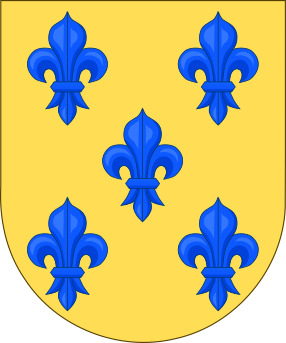
- Variant Niño Brothers of Moguer, Spain.

The first coat of arms of a member of the Niño family is first documented in the 15th century, borne by one of the male Niño family members of Cigales in Valladolid, Spain. It was used by Pero Niño, Count of Buelna and Lord of Cigales. He was a descendant of Juan Niño, a French knight from the royal house of France. This could explain the presence of the fleur-de-lis on it.

The origins of the Niño lineage can be traced back to the city of Toledo, Spain where it was established. Over time, it went on to become associated with other esteemed houses of great lords in Castile and Europe. Other branches of the Niño family are found in Spain, Portugal, and America.

The Niño coat of arms has a golden background and seven blue fleurs-de-lis arranged in three suits of 2-3-2 flowers. The design has been used since the 15th century by different members of this family on different continents, it is found in Spain and Colombia in a colonial mansion in Tunja.

== Niño Brothers ==
A version of the coat of arms used by the Niño family can be found in the Señorío de Moguer. The Niño brothers, who were famous sailors and explorers in the late 15th century, hailed from the town of Moguer. Pedro Alonso, Francisco and Juan played vital roles in the preparations and execution of the discovery voyage to the new world. Pedro Alonso, a skilled pilot, took on the important responsibility of navigating the ship Santa María to the New World under the command of Christopher Columbus. Francisco, on the other hand, worked as a sailor on the same voyage, performing various duties to ensure the success of the expedition. Together, their contributions were instrumental in the successful discovery of America. Juan was the master of the caravel La Niña, which he also owned. The Niño family established a lineage of marine experts and ship owners who carried out numerous explorations and discoveries of the new continent by repeatedly crossing the Atlantic.

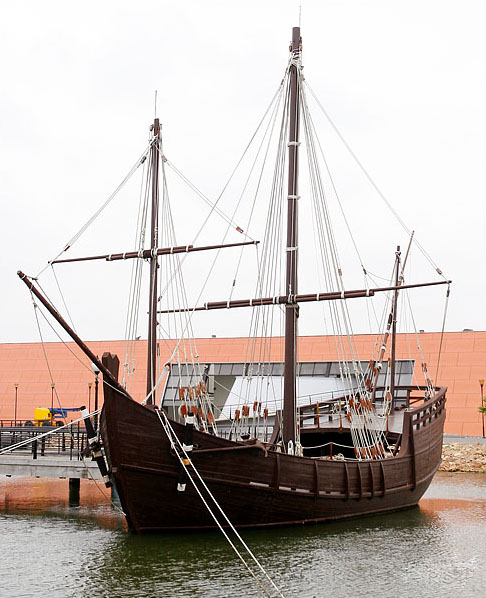
Replic of the Caravel 'La Niña', in the 'Muelle de las Carabelas', area of La Rábida, Palos de la Frontera (Huelva).

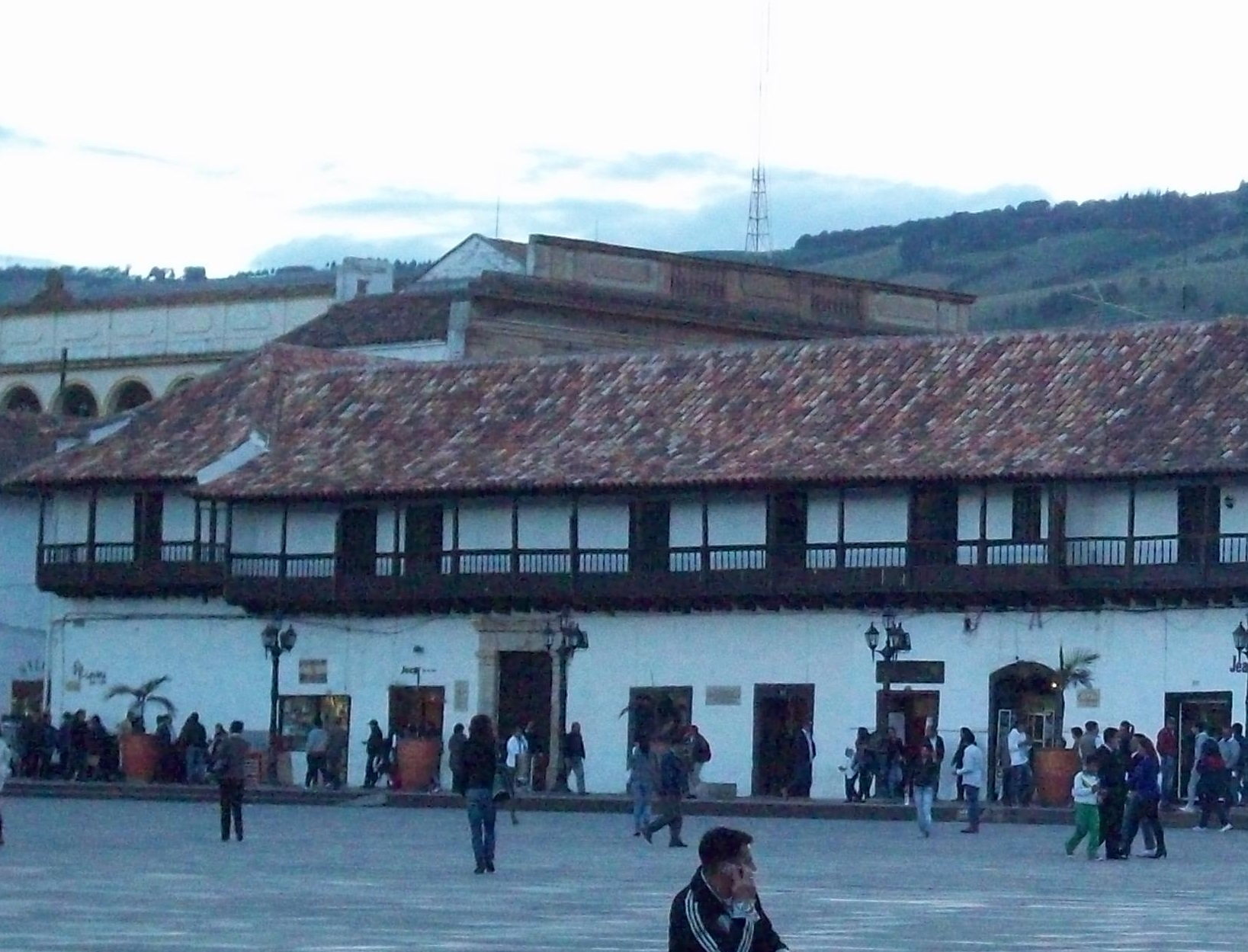
Colonial House, Tunja Colombia

This particular version of the shield is composed of a background in gold color, embellished with five blue fleurs-de-lis arranged in three groups of 2-1-2 flowers. Presently, there exist several heraldic stone sculptures on the facades of various houses located in Tunja, Colombia, where one of Pedro Alonso Niño's grandsons had settled. Among these stone carvings, there is one in particular that can be found in the House of Juan Agustín Niño and Álvarez and his son Juan Nepomuceno Niño.

== Some members ==
- Pero Niño, I lord of Cigales and Valverde, I Count of Buelna.
- Fernando Niño y Zapata, Spanish ecclesiastic.
- Fernando Niño de Guevara, Spanish ecclesiastic.

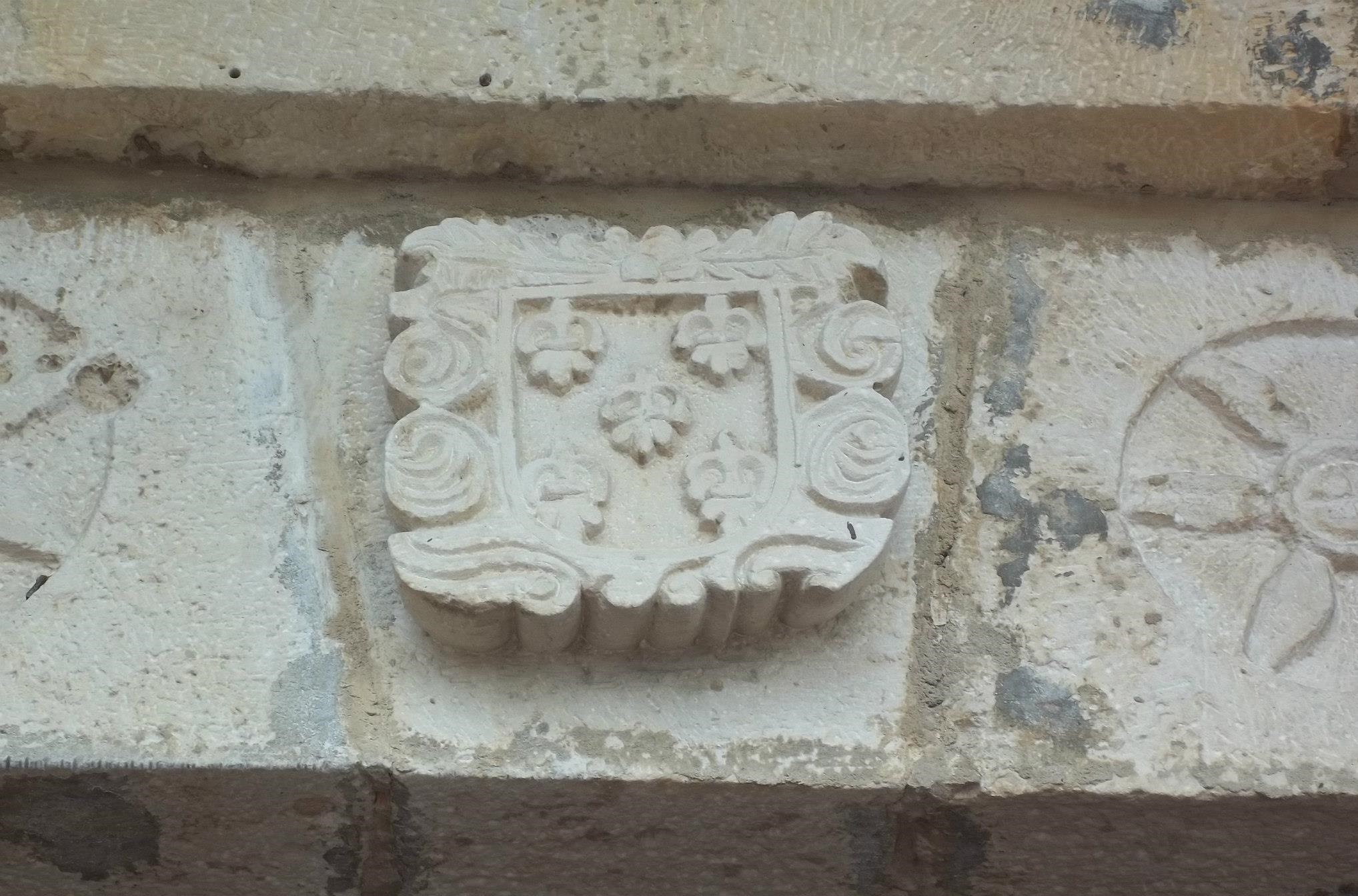
Detail of the coat of arms in the House of Juan Agustín Niño y Álvarez, in Tunja Colombia.

Niño´s of Moguer, a lineage of Spanish sailors called the Niño Brothers:

- Pedro Alonso Niño
- Juan Niño
- Francisco Niño
- Cristóbal Niño
- Andrés Niño
- Juan Agustín Niño y Álvarez, mayor of Tunja.
- Juan Nepomuceno Niño, heroe and martyr of the Colombian Independence.
- Víctor Niño, Colombian cyclist.

Caravel La Niña

- José Ferrándiz y Niño, Spanish military man and politician, vice admiral of the Spanish Navy.
- Valentín Niño Aragón, Spanish politician.
