= Ernst Melzer =

Ernst Melzer (September 21, 1835 – February 1, 1899) was a German educator and philosopher born in the Silesian village of Leifersdorf.

He studied philosophy and theology at the University of Bonn, earning his doctorate in 1860. From 1868 to 1885 he taught classes in Neisse. He died in Bonn on February 1, 1899.

Initially a prominent supporter of Güntherianism; in the 1870s he became involved with the German Old Catholic movement. He was the author of a biographical work on theologian Johann Baptista Baltzer called "Johannes Baptista Baltzers Leben, Wirken und wissenschaftliche Bedeutung" (1877). Other significant publications by Melzer include:

- Goethes philosophische Entwicklung (Goethe's philosophical development), 1884.
- Erkenntnistheoretische Erörterungen über die Systeme von Ulrici und Günther (Epistemological debates concerning the philosophical systems of Hermann Ulrici and Anton Günther), 1886.
- Der Beweis für das Dasein Gottes und seine Persoenlichkeit (Evidence for the existence of God and his character), 1895.
