= Anton Günther =

Austrian philosopher (1783–1863)

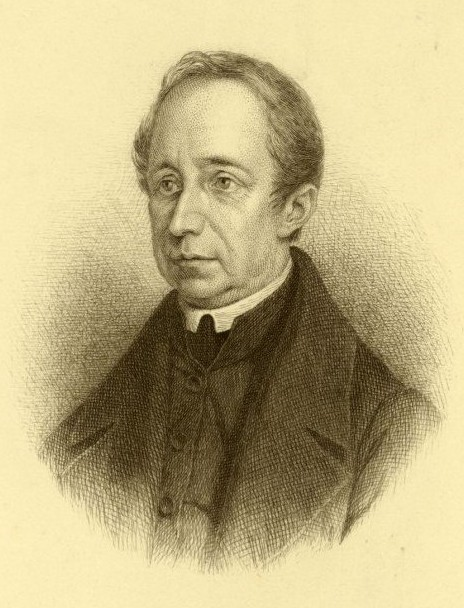
Anton Günther

Anton Günther (17 November 1783, Lindenau, Bohemia (now part of Cvikov, Czech Republic) – 24 February 1863, Vienna) was an Austrian Roman Catholic philosopher whose work was condemned by the church as heretical tritheism. His work has been described as Liberal Catholicism and Vienna's first Catholic political movement. His writings made him a leader among the generation of German Catholic theologians who emerged from the Romantic movement.

== Biography ==
Anton Günther was born the eldest son of devout Catholic parents at Lindenau (now part of Cvikov) in Bohemia. His father was a blacksmith. From 1796 to 1800 he attended the monastic school of the Piarists at Haide and from 1800 to 1803 the gymnasium of Leitmeritz. Subsequently he studied philosophy and jurisprudence at Prague, where he studied under, among others, Bernard Bolzano, and paid his way by assisting the teachers. After completing these studies he became a tutor in the household of Prince Bretzenheim.

Günther's religious views had been shaken during the years of his student life by his study of the modern systems of philosophy (Kant, Johann Gottlieb Fichte, Jacobi and Friedrich Wilhelm Joseph Schelling); but his removal in 1810 to Brünn (Brno) near Vienna with the prince's family brought him under the influence of the parish priest of this place, named Korn, and particularly of Saint Clement Mary Hofbauer, and restored him to firm Catholic convictions. He then took up the study of theology, first at Vienna and afterwards at Raab (Győr) in Hungary.

From 1818 Günther was active in the world of letters as contributor to the "Viennese Literary Chronicle" (Wiener Jahrbücher der Literatur). In 1820 he was ordained to the priesthood. In 1822 he entered the Jesuit novitiate at Starawicz in Galicia, but left it in 1824 due to poor health and differences with the Jesuits. For the rest of his life he resided at Vienna as a private ecclesiastic. In 1828 began to appear the series of works in which he expounded his system of philosophy and speculative theology. He wrote extensively, tutored, and served as a chaplain at the court church. He spent most of his life in the city as a reclusive scholar, supported primarily by an annual stipend from a noble patron. Much of his time he spent reviewing literary, philosophical, and theological works, but it did not pay well.

Günther was well-respected. in 1847 he was offered a canonry at St. Stephen's Cathedral. In 1849, he received an honorary doctorate in theology from Charles-Ferdinand University in Prague, and in 1852 one from the Ludwig-Maximilians-Universität München. Until 1848 occupied a position in that city as a member of the State Board of Book Censorship. He died in Vienna.

== Views ==
Günther rejected scholastic philosophy in favor of idealism. He aimed to derive his own system of Christian philosophy in opposition to the pantheist views common at the time, especially Hegelianism. Moreover, he attempted to demonstrate logically that major Christian teachings, including the Trinity and the Incarnation, were in some sense necessary truths. The Incarnation specifically was central to his philosophy.

Günther viewed history as "...a dialectic between God's work of redemption and man's constant misuse of his freedom."

The first result of his ideal thought-process is self-consciousness, the knowledge which man acquires of himself as a real being. Inasmuch as the soul contradistinguishes itself as a real being from whatever appears before it, it arrives at the idea of the Ego. By this speculative process, which Günther calls a "metalogical" or ideal (ideell) inference, as distinct from a logical or conceptual conclusion, the idea of its own being becomes for the soul the most certain of all truths (the Cartesian cogito ergo sum). Then from the certainty of its own existence the thinking soul arrives at the knowledge of an existence outside itself, since it is confronted by phenomena which it cannot refer to itself as cause, and for which, in line with the ontological inference, it must assign a cause in some real being external to itself.

The fact of self-consciousness leads him also to the knowledge of God; and Günther believes that the following proof of the existence of God is the only one that is possible and conclusive: when the soul, once self-conscious, has become certain of the reality of its own existence, it immediately recognizes that existence to be afflicted with the negative characteristics of dependency and limitedness; it is therefore compelled to postulate another being as its own condition precedent or its own creator, which being it must recognize, in contradistinction to itself and its own inherent negative characteristics, as absolute and infinite. Wherefore this being cannot be the Absolute Being of Pantheism, which only arrives at a realization of itself with the development of the universe; it must be One Who dominates that universe and, differing substantially from it, is the Personal Creator thereof. This is the point at which Günther's speculative theology takes up the thread. Proceeding along purely philosophical lines, and prescinding entirely from historical Divine Revelation, the absolute necessity of which Günther contests, it seeks to make evident the fundamental tenets of positive Christianity by the mere light of reason.

This world-reality, which God, by the mere act of His will, has through creation called from nothingness into being, does indeed exist as really as God Himself. Thus the two antithetical factors of spirit and nature in the created world differ substantially from each other and stand in mutual opposition. The antithetical relation of spirit and nature shows itself in this, that the realm of the purely spiritual is formed of a plurality of substances, of unitary and integral real principles, each of which must ever retain its unity and its integrity; while nature, which was created a single substance, a single real principle, has in its process of differentiation lost its unity for ever, and has brought forth, and still brings forth, a multiplicity of forms or individuals. For this very reason nature, in her organic individual manifestations, each of which is only a fragment of the universal nature-substance, can only attain to thought without self-consciousness. Self-conscious thought, on the other hand, is peculiar to the spirit, since self-consciousness, the thought of the Ego, presupposes the substantial unity and integrity of a free personality. The synthesis of spirit and nature is man. From man's character as a generic being, the result of his participation in the life of nature, Günther deduces the rational basis of the dogmas of the Incarnation and Redemption. And, as this explains why the guilt of the first parent extends to the entire race, so also does it show how God could with perfect consistency bring about the redemption of the race which had fallen in Adam through the God-Man's union with that race as its second Head, Whose free compliance with the Divine will lay the basis of the fund of hereditary merit which serves to cancel the inherited guilt.

Günther was a faithful Catholic and a devout priest. His philosophical labours were a sincere and honest endeavour to promote the triumph of positive Christianity over those systems of philosophy which were inimical to it. But it is questionable whether those outside his circle whether conservative scholastics or rival idealists could have found his approach convincing without further development. His philosophy of nature and philosophical method, being closer to Hegel than Aristotle's did little to endear him to the scholastics especially. The schools of philosophy which he thought he could compel, by turning their own weapons against them, to recognize the truth of Christianity, took practically no notice of his ardent contentions, while the Catholic Church not only was unable to accept his system as the true Christian philosophy and to supplant with it the Scholastic system, but was to reject it as unsound despite its merits.

== Guntherians ==
With the 1848 revolution violence broke out in Vienna, and Archbishop Vinzenz Eduard Milde withdrew from the city. Günther's followers stayed, and organized the clergy and laity against the archbishop's wishes. The Güntherians became advocates of constitutional monarchy. They also advocated for free speech, press, and association. They were repressed upon the Archbishop's return.

== Works ==
- Vorschule zur speculativen Theologie des positiven Christenthums (Introduction to the Speculative Theology of Positive Christianity), in letter form; part I: "Die Creationstheorie" (The Theory of Creation); part II "Die Incarnationstheorie" (The Theory of the Incarnation) (1st ed., Vienna, 1828-9; 2nd ed., 1846-8);
- Peregrins Gastmahl. Eine Idylle in elf Octaven aus dem deutschen wissenschaftlichen Volksleben, mit Beiträgen zur Charakteristik europäischer Philosophie in älterer und neuerer Zeit (Vienna, 1830; new ed., 1850);
- Süd- und Nordlichter am Horizont speculativer Theologie, Fragment eines evangelischen Briefwechsels (Vienna, 1832; new ed., 1850);
- Janusköpfe für Philosophie und Theologie (in collaboration with J. H. Pabst; Vienna, 1833);
- Der letzte Symboliker. Eine durch die symbolischen Werke Dr. J. A. Möhlers und Dr. F. C. Baurs veranlasste Schrift in Briefen (Vienna, 1834);
- Thomas a Scrupulis. Zur Transfiguration der Persönlichkeits-Pantheismen neuester Zeit (Vienna, 1835);
- Die Juste-Milieus in der deutschen Philosophie gegenwärtiger Zeit (Vienna, 1838);
- Eurystheus und Herakles. Metalogische Kritiken und Meditationen (Vienna, 1843).

A new edition of these eight works, collected into nine volumes, appeared at Vienna in 1882 under the title of Günther's Gesammelte Schriften. In addition to these, Günther produced in conjunction with J. E. Veith: "Lydia, Philosophisches Jahrbuch" (5 volumes, Vienna, 1849–54). His "Lentigos und Peregrins Briefwechsel" was printed in 1857, but was issued only for private circulation. Finally, long after Günther's death, Franz Peter Knoodt published from his posthumous papers "Anti-Savarese" (Vienna, 1883).

== Reception ==
Günther's writings sparked a movement which attracted prestigious Catholic scholars as both followers and opponents. Some members of his school received academic professorships in Catholic philosophy. Günther himself turned down professorships at the Ludwig-Maximilians-Universität München, the University of Bonn, the University of Breslau and the University of Tübingen in the hope of an offer from the University of Vienna, which he never received. In 1833, he received an honorary degree of Doctor of Theology from the Ludwig-Maximilians-Universität München, and a similar degree in philosophy and theology was conferred on him by Charles University in Prague in 1848.

Günther's earliest friends and collaborators were Johann Heinrich Pabst, Johann Emmanual Veith, and Karl Franz von Hock. Other prominent adherents included:

- Johann Heinrich Löwe
- Johann Nepomuk Ehrlich
- Jakob Zukrigl
- Xaver Schmid
- Jakob Merten
- Karl Werner
- Theodor Gangauf
- Johann Spörlein
- Georg Karl Mayer
- Peter Knoodt
- Peter Joseph Elvenich
- Johann Baptista Baltzer
- Joseph Hubert Reinkens
- Theodor Weber
- Ernst Melzer

Günther's opponents included:

- Johann Hast
- Wenzeslaus Mattes
- Peter Volkmuth
- P. Ildephons Sorg
- Johann Nepomuk Oischinger
- Franz Xaver Dieringer
- Franz Jakob Clemens
- Friedrich Michelis
- Johann Adam Hitzfelder
- Joseph Kleutgen
- Johannes Katschthaler

== Branded heretical ==
The Congregation of the Index in Rome began in 1852 an investigation of Günther's doctrines and writings, Günther being invited to appear personally or to send some of his disciples to represent him. This mission was entrusted to Baltzer and Gangauf who arrived at Rome in November, 1853. Gangauf was replaced by Knoodt, a professor of theology at Bonn, in the summer of 1854. The latter and Baltzer laboured together until the end of November in that year, when they submitted their written defence to the Congregation of the Index and returned to Germany. Yet their efforts and the favourable intervention of friends in high station failed to avert the final blow, though they served to defer it for a time.

Cardinal Schwarzenberg and Cardinal von Diepenbrock and Bishop Arnoldi of Trier were friendly to Günther and assisted him at Rome. Even the head of the Congregation of the Index, Cardinal d'Andrea, was well-disposed towards him. On the other hand, Cardinals Johannes von Geissel, Joseph Othmar von Rauscher and Karl August von Reisach urged his condemnation. By decree of 8 January 1857 the Congregation placed the works of Günther on the Index librorum prohibitorum. The special grounds of this condemnation were set forth by Pius IX in the Brief addressed by him to Cardinal von Geissel, Archbishop of Cologne, on 15 June 1857, which declares that Günther's teachings on the Trinity, the Person of Christ, the nature of man, the Creation and particularly his views on the relation of faith to knowledge, as well as fundamental rationalism, which is the controlling factor of his philosophy even in the handling of Christian dogmas, are not consistent with the doctrine of the Church.

Before the publication of the Index decree, Günther had been summoned to submit thereto, and in fact had declared his acquiescence, but for him internal submission and rejection of his errors was out of the question. He felt keenly the blow, which he looked upon as an injustice and which embittered him; but subsequently he published nothing. Some of his followers, like Merten, now turned away from Güntherianism, but the greater number held to it obstinately, and for many years it found academic support at Bonn (through Knoodt) and at Breslau (through Elvenich and Weber). After the First Vatican Council most of the Güntherians named above who were still living at the time (with the exception of Veith) joined the Old Catholic movement, in which some of them assumed leading parts. Their hopes of thus imparting new vigour to Güntherianism were not realized, whereas, by their separation from the Church, they brought about the final elimination of Güntherian influence from Catholic thought.

== See also ==
- Johann Emanuel Veith, friend and associate of Günther
