= Johann Heinrich Loewe =

Austrian philosopher

Johann Heinrich Loewe (December 12, 1808 – January 15, 1892) was an Austrian philosopher born in Prague. Dr. and k.k. Professor of philosophie, Wife Magdalena Babitsch, born in Vienna 1814, dead 17.9.1880 in Gross-Gmain. 3 daughters,

From 1839 to 1851 he was a professor of philosophy in Salzburg, and in 1851 was appointed professor of theoretical and moral philosophy at the University of Prague. He was a prominent supporter of philosopher Anton Günther, and author of a biography on minister Johann Emanuel Veith (Johann Emanuel Veith. Eine Biographie, 1879). Other noted works by Loewe include:

- Über den Begriff der Logik, (On the perception of logic), 1849
- Das spekulative System des René Descartes, (The speculative system of René Descartes), 1854
- Die Philosophie Fichtes. Mit einem Anhange über des Gottesbegriff Spinozas (The philosophy of Fichte, with an appendix on Spinoza's concept of God), 1862
- Der Kampf zwischen dem Realismus und Nominalismus im Mittelalter, sein Ursprung und sein Verlauf, (The struggle between realism and nominalism in the Middle Ages, its origin and its behaviour), 1876
- Lehrbuch der Logik, (Textbook of logic), 1881
- Die speculative Idee der Freiheit, ihre Widersacher, ihre praktische Verwertung, (The speculative idea of freedom, its antagonists, its practical application), 1890.
