= Bruno Schön =

Bruno Schön (born 5 May 1809, Obersandau bei Marienbad, Egerland, West Bohemia; died 1 February 1881, Vienna) was a member of the Order of Friars Minor Conventual, pastoral psychiatrist, and homeopath based in Vienna, where he ministered at an asylum. He earned a Doctorate in Theology (1837) and in Philosophy (1867), both in Rome.

Schön was also an author who wrote pamphlets and books on the topics of his profession, including a novel advocating for the humane treatment of the mentally ill, Mittheilungen aus dem Leben Geistesgestörter (English: Stories from the Lives of the Mentally Ill) published in 1859. This and another of his works, Briefe über Geistesgestörte für Seelsorger, Eltern, Lehrer und Freunde der Menschenkunde (English: Letters on the Mentally Disturbed for Pastors, Parents, Yourself, and Friends of Humanity) were held in the collection of the US Surgeon General's Office Library. His Mittheilungen has been referenced in other works as recently as 2017.

Schön courted controversy when he posited in Dr. Martin Luther aus dem Standpunkte der Psychiatrie (English: Dr. Martin Luther from the Standpoint of Psychiatry) that Luther was "mentally deranged."

He was a close friend of Johann Emanuel Veith.

== Works ==
- Mittheilungen aus dem Leben Geistesgestörter; Pest, Wien und Leipzig, 1859. (English: Stories from the Lives of the Mentally Ill)
- Briefe über Geistesgestörte für Seelsorger, Eltern, Lehrer und Freunde der Menschenkunde; Pest, Wien und Leipzig, 1861. (English: Letters on the Mentally Disturbed for Pastors, Parents, Teachers, and Friends of Humanity)
- Dr. Martin Luther aus dem Standpunkte der Psychiatrie, Wien 1874. (English: Dr. Martin Luther from the Standpoint of Psychiatry)
- Was hat man bei lebensgefährlichen Fällen zu thun, bis der Arzt erscheint, Vienna 1875. (English: What to do with the Stricken until the Doctor Arrives)
