= Georg Karl Mayer =

German Roman Catholic theologian

Georg Karl Mayer (30 March 1811 – 22 July 1868) was a German Roman Catholic theologian born in Aschbach, Upper Franconia.

He studied philosophy and theology at the University of Bamberg, then continued his education at the Ludwig-Maximilians-Universität München and the University of Vienna. In 1837, he received his ordination at the University of Bamberg, and afterwards worked as a chaplain. From 1842 he was a professor at the Lyceum in Bamberg, where he taught classes in canon law, church history, dogmatics, exegesis and Hebrew language. In 1862, he was appointed Domcapitular at the University of Bamberg.

Mayer specialized in dogmatic theology, and with church historian Johann Spörlein (1814–1873), was a principal representative of Güntherianism at Bamberg. After the Church's condemnation of Anton Günther's writings in 1857, he fought for the recognition and continuation of Günther's teachings, including an appeal to the First Vatican Council.

== Selected publications ==
- "Über das Wesen und die Fortpflanzung der Erbsünde" (Regarding the essence and propagation of Original Sin), 1838
- "Geist und Natur im spekulativen Systeme Günthers" (Spirit and nature in speculative Güntherianism), 1845
- "Der Mensch nach der Glaubenslehre der alten Kirche und im speculativen Systeme Günthers " (Doctrine of faith of the Old Church and in speculative Güntherianism), 1856
- "Theologische Einwendung gegen die scholastisch-philosophische Lehre vom Menschen", (Theological objection to the scholastic philosophical doctrine of man), 1867
- "Commentar über die Briefe des Apostels Johannes", (Commentary on the letters of the Apostle John), 1851
- "Die Echtheit des Evangeliums nach Johannes", (The authenticity of the Gospel according to John), 1854
- "Die patriarchalischen Verheißungen und die messianischen Psalmen", (The patriarchal promises and the messianic Psalms), 1859
- "Die messianischen Prophezieen des Jesaias, Jeremias, Ezechiel und Daniel" (The Messianic Prophecies of Isaiah, Jeremiah, Ezekiel and Daniel), 1860–1866, two volumes
- "Zwei Thesen für das allgemeine Concil" (Two theories for the general council), 1868
