= Schwarzenberg am Böhmerwald =

- Municipality
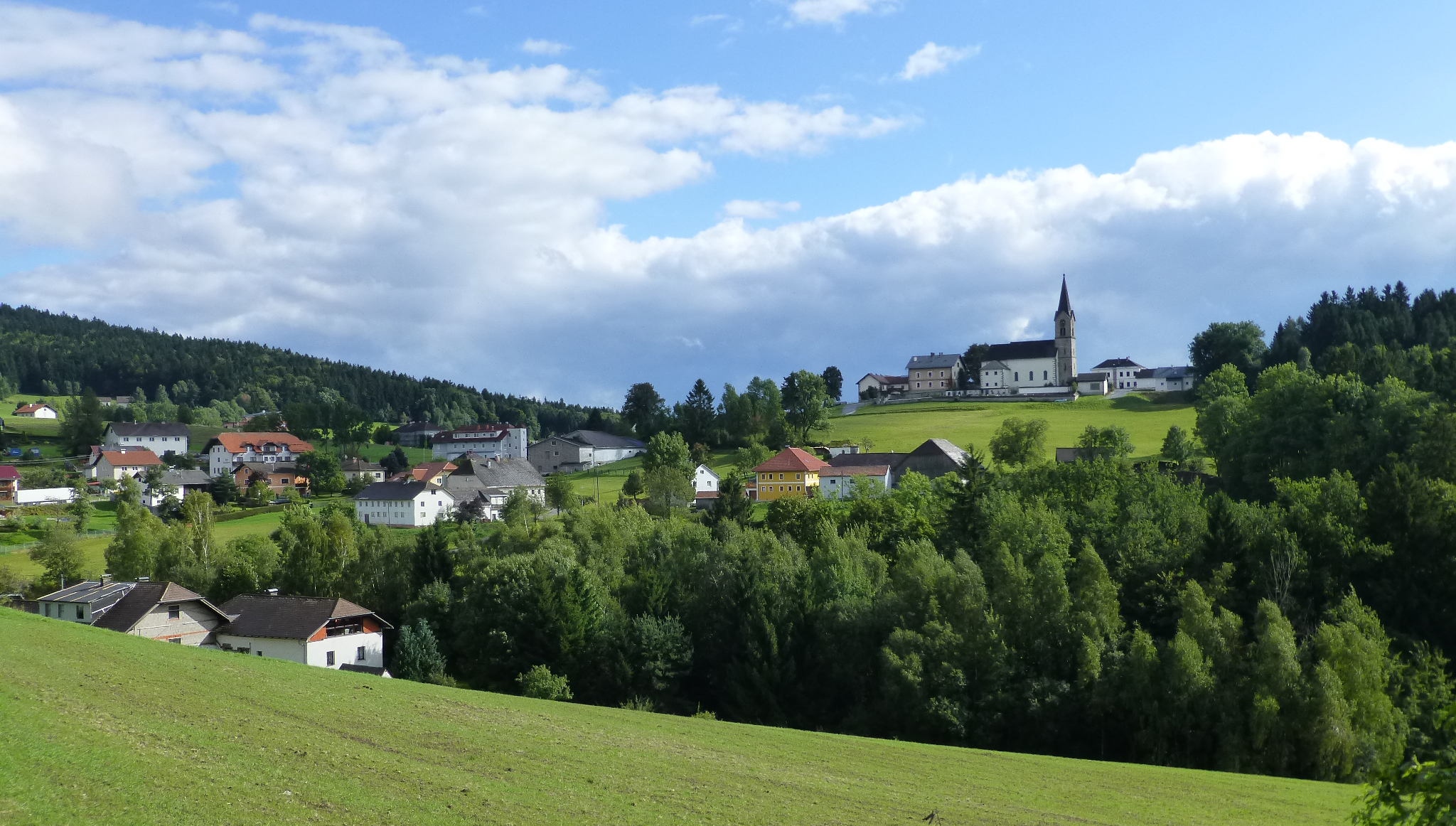

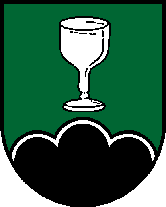
- Coat of arms

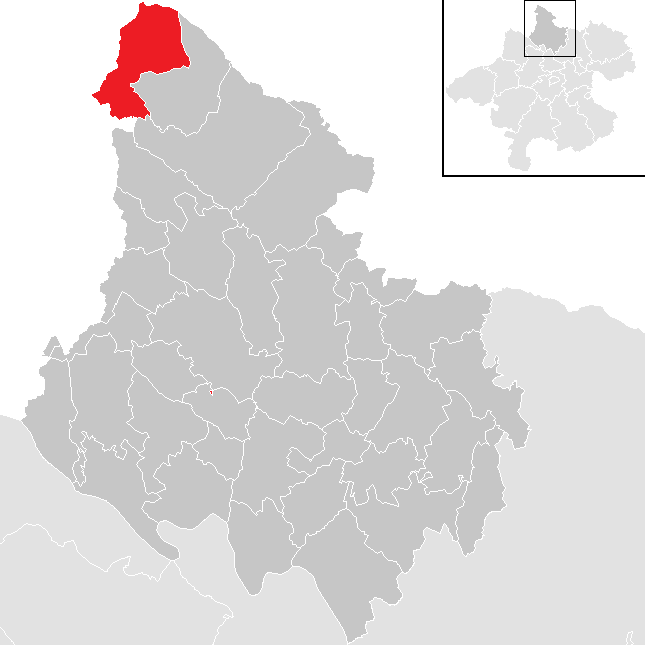
- Location in the district

- Location within Austria Location within Upper Austria
- Coordinates: 48°43′55″N 13°50′00″E
- Country: Austria
- State: Upper Austria
- District: Rohrbach

Government
  - Mayor: Michael Leitner (ÖVP)

Area
  - Total: 27.29 km^{2} (10.54 sq mi)
- Elevation: 756 m (2,480 ft)

Population (2018-01-01)
  - Total: 566
  - Density: 20.7/km^{2} (53.7/sq mi)
- Time zone: UTC+1 (CET)
  - Summer (DST): UTC+2 (CEST)
- Postal code: 4164
- Area code: 07280
- Vehicle registration: RO
- Website: www.schwarzenberg.co.at

Schwarzenberg am Böhmerwald (Black Mountain at Bohemian Forest) is a municipality in the district of Rohrbach in the Austrian state of Upper Austria.

== Geography ==
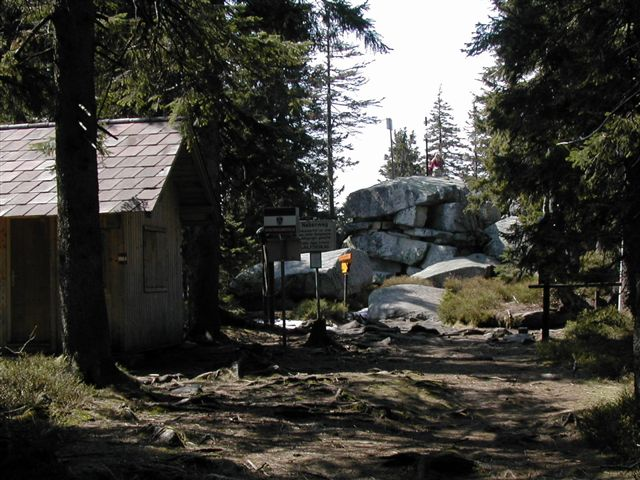
The state border near the Plöckenstein

Schwarzenberg am Böhmerwald lies in the upper (northwestern) Mühlviertel region, near the tripoint with the German state of Bavaria and the South Bohemian Region of the Czech Republic. The municipal area stretches along the southern slopes of the Bohemian Forest (Böhmerwald) range; about 71 percent of the municipality is forest, and 26 percent is farmland.

== History ==
First mentioned in 1571, the Schwarznperg estates were held by the Bavarian Prince-Bishops of Passau since medieval times. The remote area near the border with the Kingdom of Bohemia from 1638 was the site of a forest glasshouse, which became a possession of Schlägl Abbey in 1719.

Under the rule of Empress Maria Theresa, in 1765, Schwarzenberg finally passed to the Upper Austrian crown land of the Habsburg monarchy. The local parish was established according to a 1784 patent issued by Emperor Joseph II. After the Napoleonic Wars, the area became part of the Austrian Empire.

== Politics ==
Seats in the municipal assembly (Gemeinderat) as of 2015 local elections:

- Austrian People's Party (ÖVP): 9
- Freedom Party of Austria (FPÖ): 3
- Social Democratic Party of Austria (SPÖ): 1

== Notable people ==
- Franz Xaver Schmid (1819–1883), philosopher
- Viktor Schauberger (1885–1958), forester and naturalist
