= House of Juan Agustín Niño y Álvarez =

Coordinates: 5°31′56″N 73°21′44″W

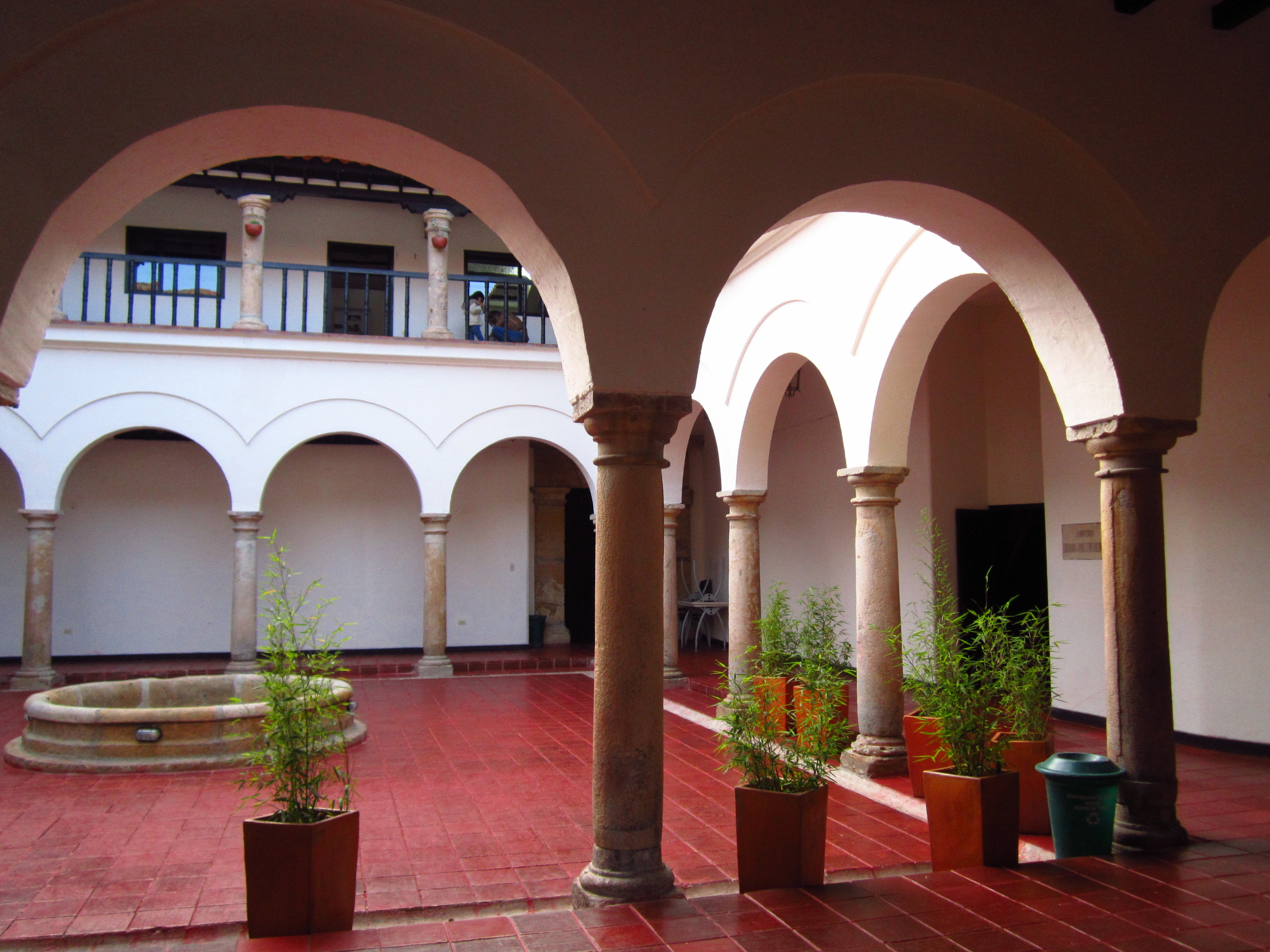
- Location: Tunja, Colombia
- Type: Institute of Culture and Fine Arts
- Accreditation: national monument of colombia
- Founder: Juan Agustín Niño y Álvarez
- Owners: Secretary of Culture and Tourism of Boyacá

The House of Juan Agustín Niño y Álvarez is a building located in Tunja, Colombia, towards the southwest direction of Plaza de Bolívar. This house has been declared an Asset of Cultural Interest. Currently, it is being used as the Secretariat of Culture and Heritage, as well as the Secretariat of Tourism of the Government of Boyacá. Additionally.

This house is a significant landmark in Tunja that represents the city's rich cultural heritage. It is a well-preserved example of colonial architecture, featuring intricate designs, ornamental details, and exquisite craftsmanship. The property has been carefully maintained, retaining its original features, such as the wooden balconies, the thick adobe walls, and the beautiful Spanish tiles.

== Architecture ==
The building's facade is located in the southwest corner of the main square, also known as Plaza Bolivar, and along 19th Street. It was constructed using the finest architectural techniques of the colonial era, in a colonial style. The second floor features a wooden balcony that has been designed in Plateresque style. The facade boasts a stone-carved set of Doric-Tuscan origin, with an entablature and pilasters sculpted in high relief. The design is similar to that of the Plateresque style. The stone-carved coat of arms of the Niño Moguer family is displayed on the cover, in a Spanish-French form, with five fleurs-de-lis and an outline border decorated with palms and spiral ribbons in the Gothic-Elizabethan style.

The edifice occupies a quadrangular area of 35 meters facing Carrera 10 and 36 meters facing 19th Street, adjacent to Plaza de Bolívar, enveloping a total area of approximately 1,260 square meters.The palace boasts a central colonnaded patio that spans two floors, with a circular fountain as the main attraction. The upper floor has a matching wooden roof and balcony.

It is currently the headquarters of the Secretariat of Culture and Heritage, and the Secretariat of Tourism of the Government of Colombia in the Department of Boyacá, with its official address being Calle Carrera number 10, numbers 19–17. 150001 Tunja.

== History ==
The historical house located in the Plaza de Bolívar, Tunja, was restored to its former glory by Juan Agustín Niño y Álvarez in 1770. This magnificent property occupies the southern part of the original building in the House of Captain Martín de Rojas. Due to its rich cultural and architectural value, the Government of Boyacá has declared it an Asset of Cultural Interest, within the program for the protection, conservation and cultural sustainability of the nation, with location ID 15001. It is also a national monument of Colombia recognized by the code 06-050. In addition, the property is framed within law 163 of 12/30/1959, of the Historic Center of Tunja, with the name of Commune 5 of the city of Tunja which includes the urban complex in conservation and heritage of the nation.

The house was inhabited by Juan Agustín Niño y Álvarez and his son Juan Nepomuceno Niño, both direct descendants of the famous Niño Brothers, co-discoverers of America along with Christopher Columbus, specifically Pedro Alonso Niño. Pedro Alonso Niño was the chief pilot in the ship Santa María on the American voyage. The trail of this intrepid and experienced navigator was followed first by his son Francisco Niño, and by this Pedro Niño's son, also called Pedro Alonso Niño, who, in 1550, settled in the city of Tunja creating a family lineage that has been perpetuated to this day.
