= Rudolf Uffrecht =

Italian sculptor

Rudolph August Heinrich Matthias Uffrecht (July 9, 1840 – November 13, 1906) was a German sculptor and painter.

== Biography ==
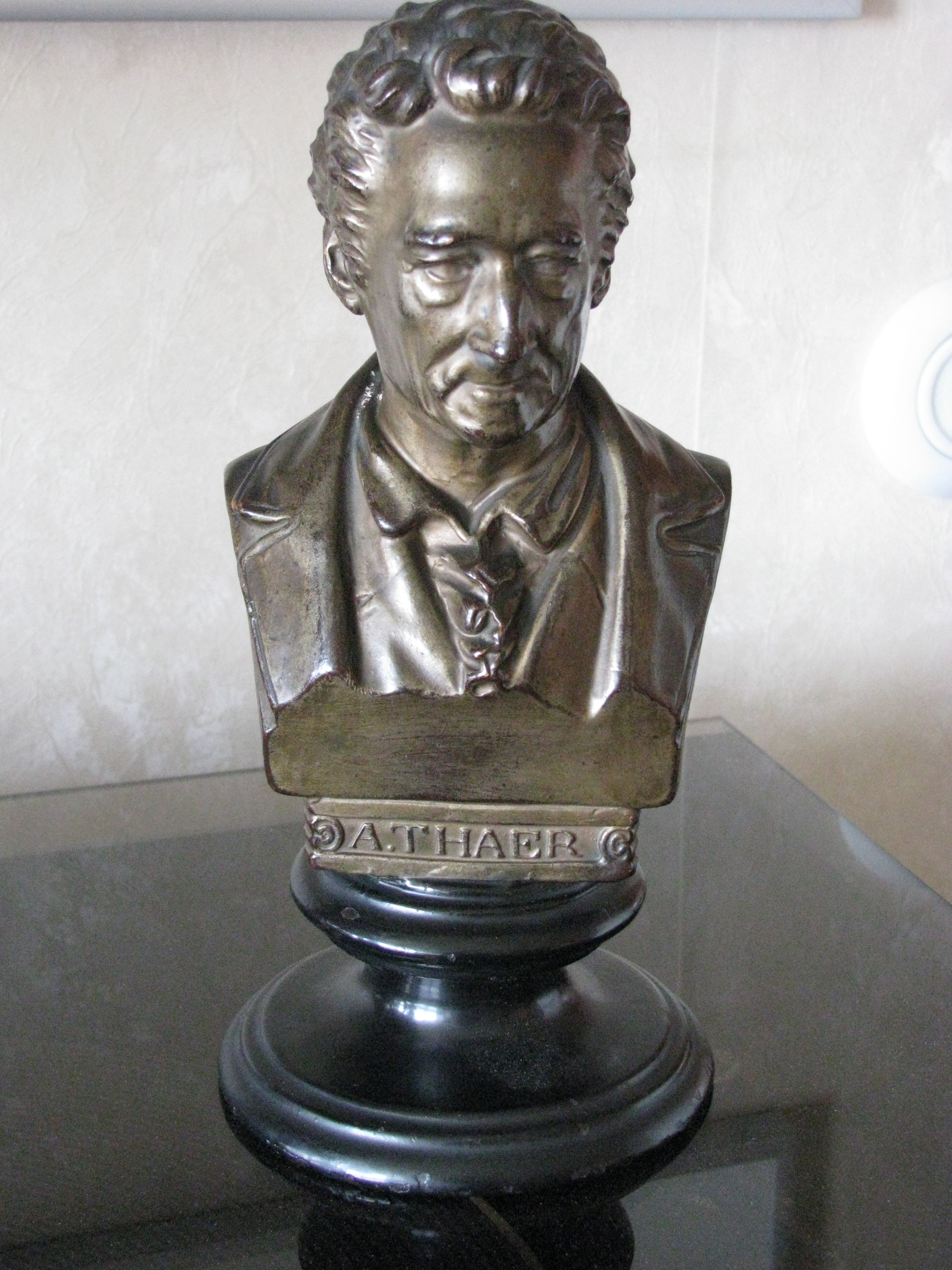
Bust of Albrecht Thaer by Uffrecht dated 1861

Rudolf Uffrecht was born in Althaldensleben, now Haldensleben. He was educated at the Academy of Arts, Berlin, his teacher was Bernhard Afinger, a close friend of Rudolf's father Jakob Uffrecht. Rudolf Uffrecht's first works as a sculptor included clay portrait busts, and statuettes of fantasies.

His father had founded a ceramics factory in Haldensleben which produced Rudolf's works commercially, among other wares. He received a first award for his terre cotte at the Expositions of Stettin (now Szczecin) (1862), then at Leipzig (1809). A few years later he moved to Rome, where he worked as a sculptor and painter. He was prolific, creating statuettes of Romeo and Juliet; of major German composers such as Beethoven, Mozart, Mendelssohn, Haydn, and Bach; of Dante, Michelangelo, and Raphael; and portraits of the Prince of Prussia, the Prince Otto von Bismarck and general Moltke.

Rudof Uffrecht died in Berlin on November 13, 1906.
