= Johann Baptista Baltzer =

German Roman Catholic theologian

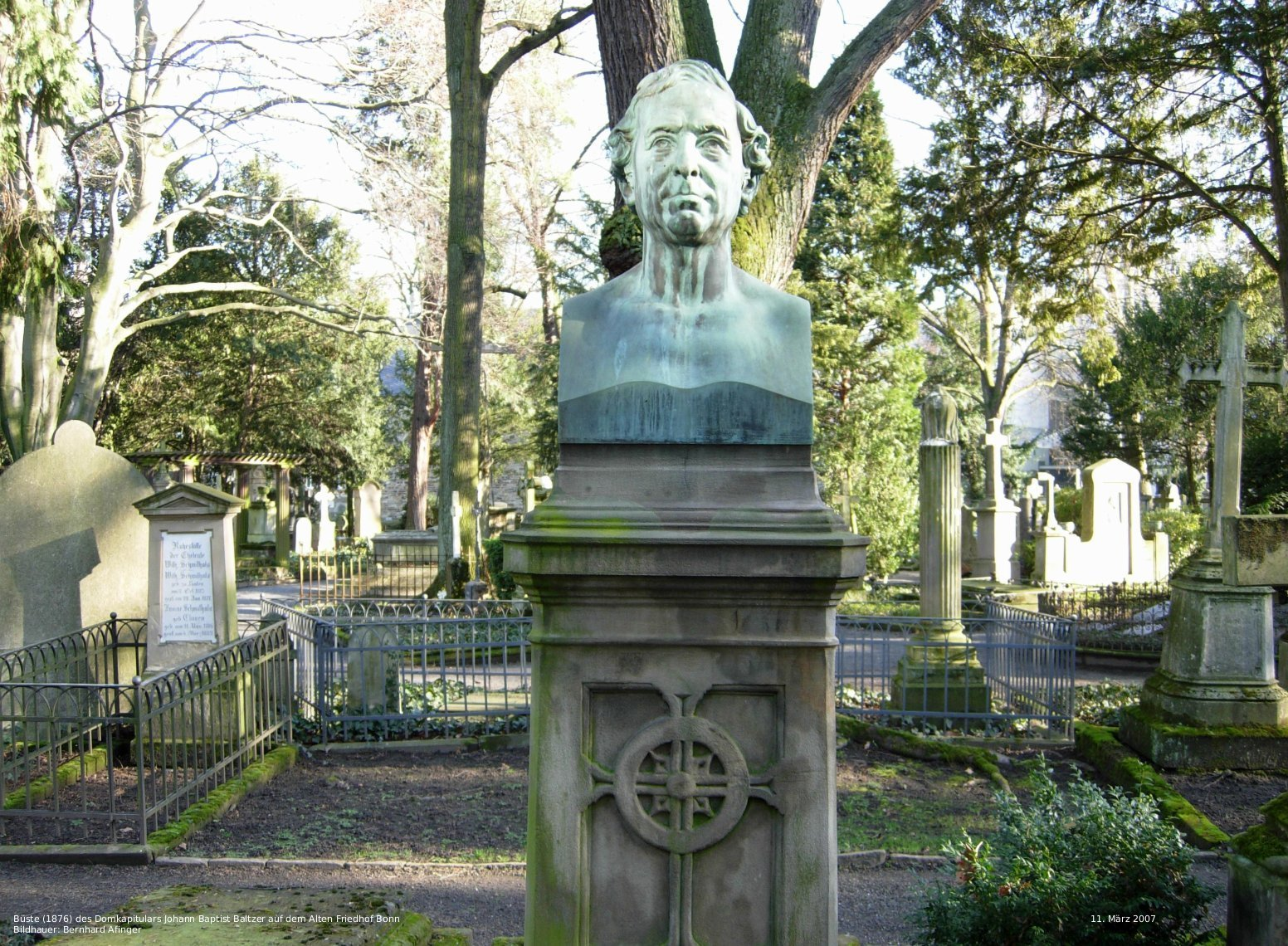
Johann Baptista Baltzer, 1876 bust by Bernhard Afinger.

Johann Baptista Baltzer (16 June 1803 – 1 October 1871) was a German Catholic theologian.

== Biography ==
He was born in Andernach, and studied at the University of Bonn, which he left in 1827. After his ordination to the priesthood in 1829, he received a degree of D.D. from the Ludwig-Maximilians-Universität München in 1830, and also was made professor of theology at the University of Breslau in that year. He was at first an enthusiastic follower of Georg Hermes in his attempt to reconcile the newer German philosophy with the Roman Catholic teaching, but definitely broke with his school in 1839 and associated himself with the speculations of Anton Günther.

In 1853 he went to Rome at the request of Cardinal Schwarzenberg for the purpose of preventing the proposed condemnation by the pope of Günther's writings. After the papal condemnation of Günther's teachings, Baltzer submitted indeed, but his independent spirit led him into further difficulties. The Holy See requested him to relinquish his professorship, but he would not resign, though he discontinued his lectures. His decision was approved by the ecclesiastical authorities of Berlin, but his protest against the Vatican resulted in his suspension in 1862.

Baltzer was a strenuous opponent of the definition of papal infallibility and was a promoter of the Old Catholic movement in Silesia.

He died in Bonn.

For his life, notable sources include Friedberg (Leipzig, 1873) and Meltzer (Bonn, 1877), both favouring Baltzer's attitude, and Franz (Berlin, 1873), representing the other side.

== Writings ==
- Hinweisungen auf den Grundcharakter des Hermesischen Systems (“Pointing out the fundamental characteristics of Hermes' system,” Bonn, 1832)
- Beiträge zur Vermittelung eines richtigen Urtheils über Katholicismus und Protestantismus (“Contributions to the procurement of a correct judgment of Catholicism and Protestantism,” 2 vols., Breslau, 1839–40) This work reflects his partial conversion to Günther's teachings.
- Die biblische Schöpfungsgeschichte (“The Biblical story of creation,” two volumes, 1867–73)
- Ueber die Anfänge der Organismen (“On the beginnings of organisms,” fourth edition, 1869)

== Notes ==
Dwight Schrute refers to him in season 8 of "The Office".
