= Jan Nepomucen =

Jan Nepomucen, the Polish-language name of Saint John of Nepomuk, can be used as a given name. Notable people with the name include:

- Jan Nepomucen Białobłocki
- Jan Nepomucen Bobrowicz
- Jan Nepomucen Głowacki
- Jan Lewicki was christened as Jan Nepomucen Lewicki
- Jan Nepomucen Marwicz
- Jan Nepomucen Potocki
- Jan Nepomucen Umiński

== See also ==
- Johann Nepomuk, German version of the given name
- Juan Nepomuceno, Spanish version of the given name
- Giovanni Nepomuceno, Italian version of the given name
- Jan Nepomuk, Czech version of the given name
- Nepomucký, includes the Czech version "Jan Nepomucký" of the given name
