= Nepomuceno (surname) =

Nepomuceno is a surname meaning "of Nepomuk", a tribute to John of Nepomuk. Notable people with the surname include:

- Alberto Nepomuceno (1864–1920), Brazilian composer and conductor
- Bryan Matthew Nepomuceno (born 1980), Filipino lawyer, politician and businessman
- Daniel Nepomuceno Navarro (born 1991), American soccer player
- David Nepomuceno (1900–1939), Filipino sprinter
- Francis Nepomuceno (born 1951), Filipino politician
- Francisco Nepomuceno (1916–1997), Filipino politician
- Gevaro Nepomuceno (born 1992), Curaçaoan footballer
- José Nepomuceno (1893–1959), Filipino film directors and producer
- Juanita Nepomuceno (1914–2000), Filipino lawyer and politician
- Paeng Nepomuceno (born 1957), Filipino bowler and coach
- Willie Nepomuceno, Filipino satirist and public intellectual

== See also ==
- Juan Nepomuceno, Spanish double given name
- Giovanni Nepomuceno, Italian double given name
- Nepomucký, a similar Czech surname
