= Theodor Weber =

German theologian and professor of philosophy

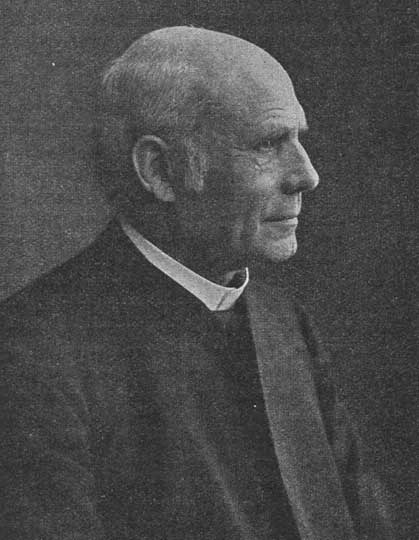
- Born: Theodor Hubert Weber; 28 January 1836; Zülpich, Rhine Province, Kingdom of Prussia
- Died: 12 January 1906 (aged 69); Halle (Saale), Kingdom of Prussia, German Empire
- Education: Leipzig University; University of Göttingen
- Theological work
- Language: German

Theodor Hubert Weber (28 January 1836, Zülpich, Rhine Province - 12 January 1906) was a German theologian and professor of philosophy.

== Biography ==
Weber was born in Zülpich. He was the second bishop of the German Old Catholic Church, and one of the more important followers of Anton Günther's philosophy.

In 1858 he obtained his doctorate of philosophy at the University of Bonn under the tutelage of Franz Peter Knoodt (1811-1889). In 1860 he received his ordination in Breslau, and from 1862 to 1864 was a schoolteacher in the town of Sagan. In 1868 he received his habilitation, later serving as a professor of philosophy at the University of Breslau (1872 to 1890).

In 1890 he relocated to Bonn, where he was named vicar-general by Joseph Hubert Reinkens (1821-1896). In 1896 he succeeded Reinkens as bishop of the German Old Catholic Church.

== Works ==
Among his better known writings are the following:

- Schülers Metaphysik. Anschauungen vom Menschen (Student metaphysics, views from the people), 1864
- Kants Dualismus von Geist und Natur aus dem Jahre 1766 und der des positiven Christentums (Kant's dualism of mind and nature from the year 1766 and positive Christianity), 1866
- Geschichte der neuen deutschen Philosophie (History of the new German philosophy), 1873
- Zur Kritik der Kantschen Erkenntnistheorie (Critique of Kantian epistemology), 1882.
- Metaphysik, eine wissenschaftliche Begründung der Ontologie des positiven Christentums (Metaphysics, rationale on the ontology of positive Christianity), (1888-91 two volumes)
