= Johann Heinrich Pabst =

Johann Heinrich Pabst (25 January 1785 – 28 July 1838) was a German-Austrian medical docotr, philosopher and lay theologian who was a native of Lindau in Eichsfeld.

== Biography ==
In 1807 he earned his medical doctorate at the University of Göttingen and afterwards relocated to Vienna. Subsequently, he served as a military physician for an Austrian battalion during the Napoleonic Wars. In 1810 he resigned from his position at a hospital in Eger on account of severe illness. During convalescence his primary interests turned to theology and philosophy.

In the 1820s Pabst formed a close friendship with Austrian philosopher Anton Günther (1783–1863), and the two men collaborated on the treatise "Janusköpfe für Philosophie und Theologie" (Heads of Janus for philosophy and theology). Pabst was also the author of the following works:

- Der Mensch und seine Geschichte (Man and his history), 1830.
- Gibt es eine Philosophie des positiven Christenthums? (Is there a philosophy of positive Christianity?), 1832.
- Adam und Christus. Zur Theorie der Ehe (Adam and Christ, contribution to the theory of matrimony), 1835.
