= Jakob Zukrigl =

Jakob Zukrigl (26 July 1807 – 9 June 1876) was an Austrian-German Catholic theologian born in the Moravian village of Gross-Olkowitz. He was a prominent supporter of the philosophical teachings of Anton Günther (1783–1863).

Following his ordination in 1831, he worked as a chaplain in the town of Laa. Later on, he served as a chaplain in Hainburg and afterwards in Vienna (1840), where in 1847 he was appointed professor of Christian philosophy at the university. Soon afterwards, he relocated to the University of Tübingen, where he was a professor of philosophy and apologetics from 1848 to 1873. Among his written works are the following:

- Wissenschaftliche Rechtfertigung der christlichen Trinitätslehre (Scholarly justification concerning the Christian doctrine of the Trinity), 1846
- Die Nothwendigkeit der christlichen Offenbarungsmoral und ihr philosophischer Standpunkt (The necessity of Christian religious morality and its philosophical standpoint), 1850
