= Juan Nepomuceno =

Juan Nepomuceno is a Spanish-language given name given as a tribute to John of Nepomuk. The feminine form is Juana Nepomucena. Notable people with the name include:

== As the first name ==
- Juan Nepomuceno Almonte
- Juan Nepomuceno Álvarez (1790–1867), Former president of Mexico
- Juan Nepomuceno Burriel
- Juan Nepomuceno Cascallana (1785–1868), Spanish Catholic priest, rector of the University of Osuna, bishop of Astorgaand of Malaga, and senator for life
- Juan Nepomuceno Cortina
- Juan Nepomuceno Fernández Lindo (1790–1857), Honduran politician
- Juan Nepomuceno Guerra (1915–2001), Mexican drug lord
- Juan Nepomuceno Machado, Filipino-born Mexican merchant
- Juan Nepomuceno Méndez
- Juan Nepomuceno Niño
- Juan Nepomuceno Padilla
- Juan Nepomuceno Rencoret (1856-?), Chilean doctor
- Juan Nepomuceno de Quesada (1738–1798), Spanish military officer
- Juan Nepomuceno Seguín
- Juan Nepomuceno Solá (1751–1819), Argentine Catholic priest
- Juan Nepomuceno Terrero y Escalada
- Juan Nepomuceno Zegrí Moreno (1831–1905), Spanish Roman Catholic priest

== Other ==
- Ana María Huarte, Christened Ana María Josefa Ramona Juana Nepomucena Marcelina Huarte y Muñiz
- Charles IV of Spain, Christened Carlos Antonio Pascual Francisco Javier Juan Nepomuceno José Januario Serafín Diego
- Diego Rivera, Christened Diego María de la Concepción Juan Nepomuceno Estanislao de la Rivera y Barrientos Acosta y Rodríguez
- Infante Antonio Pascual of Spain, Christened Antonio Pascual Francisco Javier Juan Nepomuceno Aniello Raimundo Silvestre
- Infante Francisco Javier of Spain, Christened Francisco Javier Antonio Pascual Bernardo Francisco de Paula Juan Nepomuceno Julián de Borbón
- Infante Gabriel of Spain, Christened Gabriel Antonio Francisco Javier Juan Nepomuceno José Serafín Pascual Salvador
- Pablo Picasso, Christened Pablo Diego José Francisco de Paula Juan Nepomuceno María de los Remedios Cipriano de la Santísima Trinidad Ruiz y Picasso (1881-1973), Spanish artist

== See also ==
- Nepomuceno (surname)
- Jan Nepomucen, Polish version of the given name
- Johann Nepomuk, German version of the given name
- Giovanni Nepomuceno, Italian version of the given name
- Nepomucký, includes the Czech version of the given name
