= Mittheilungen aus dem Leben Geistesgestörter =

1859 novel by Bruno Schön

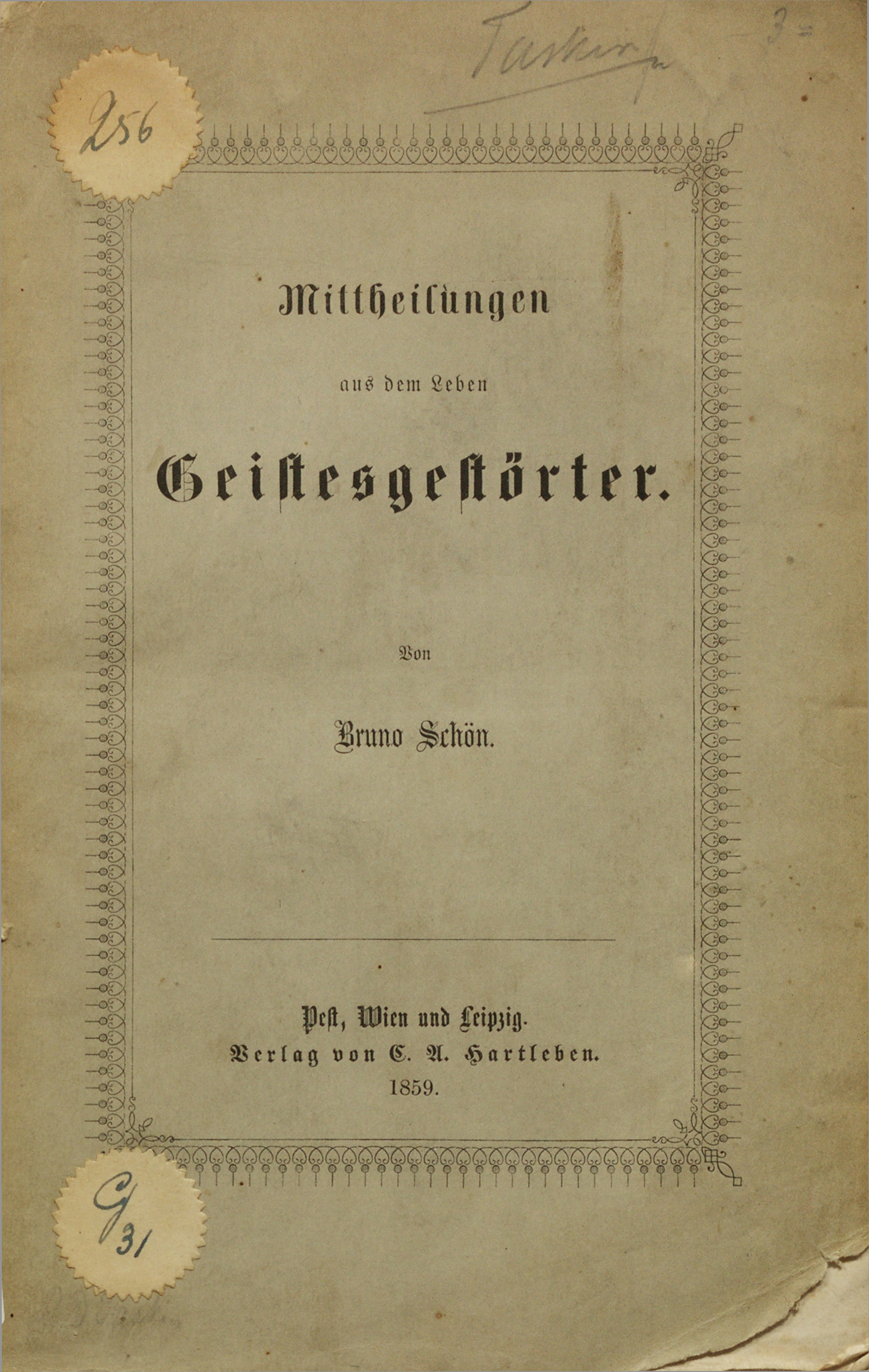
- The title page of the book
- Author: Bruno Schön
- Language: German
- Publisher: Hartleben
- Publication date: 1859
- Publication place: Hungary

Mittheilungen aus dem Leben Geistesgestörter (English: Stories of the mad people's lives) published in Pest, Hungary in 1859, is a novel written by Bruno Schön. The author, a popular priest and doctor of theology, dedicated himself to working in an insane asylum in Vienna and describes some of the cases he faced in his professional career. Schön wants to reduce the fear of the 'insane' and aims to create more understanding among the public for mental illnesses by giving short explanations of their various causes. Thus, his book is an attempt to bridge the gap between the common stigmas surrounding mental illness and professional psychiatric knowledge of the time. The focus of the book lies on giving funny and interesting examples, rather than on professional theories to keep the general public interested. It is thus a pioneer in giving information about mental illness, especially the symptoms of what is today known as schizophrenia.

== Content ==
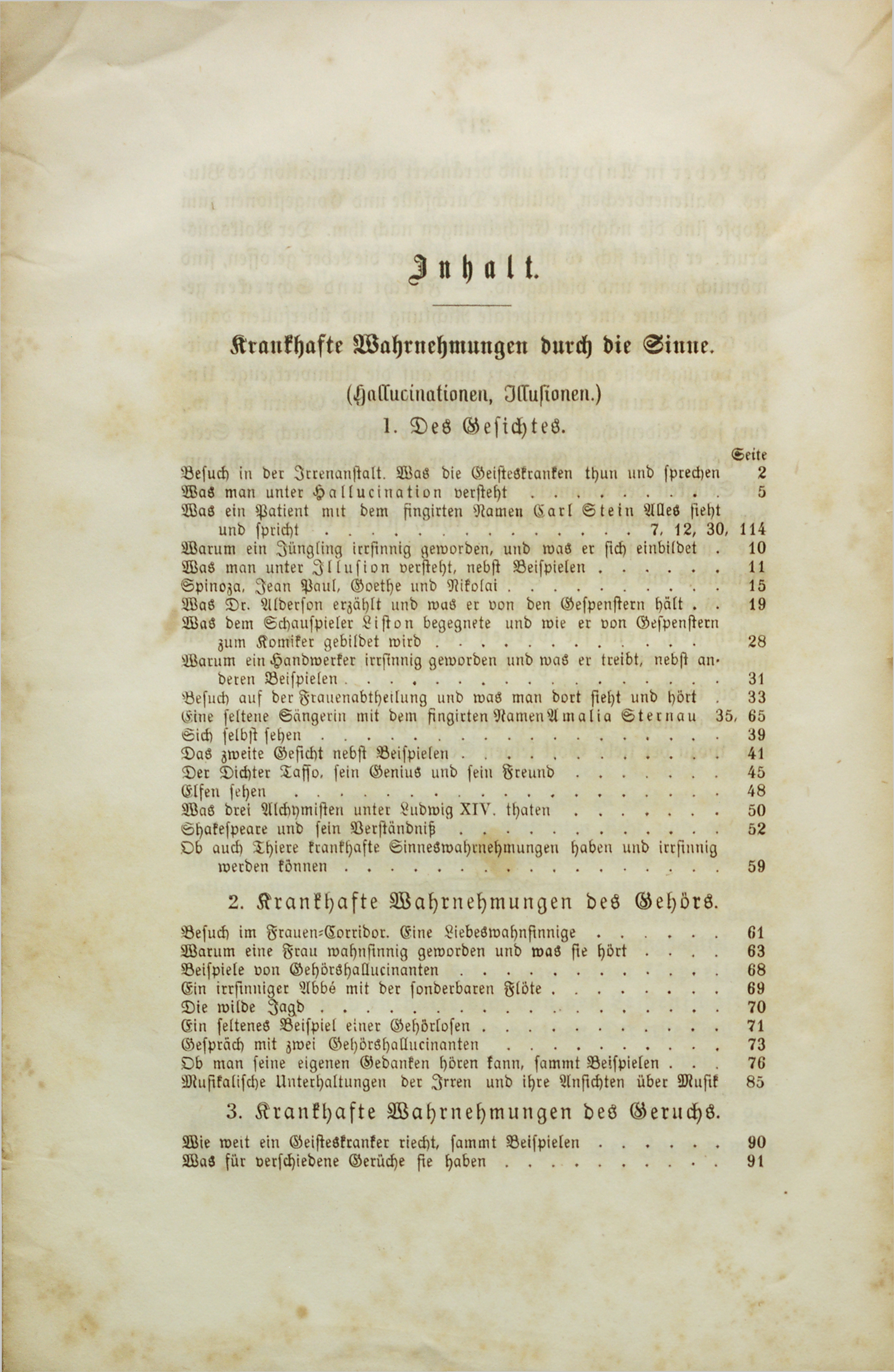
Table of contents of the book

=== Hallucinations and illusions of the senses ===
The author devotes a large part of his book to people suffering from hallucinations and illusions. As we know today, these can largely be attributed to being schizophrenic. Schön however oftentimes states that epilepsy is accompanied by such symptoms. He furthermore mentions that hallucinations are more likely to occur among people that indulge in alcohol and in flirtatious behavior with women.

1. Visual hallucinations: Among various cases with visual hallucinations, Carl Stein is described in particularly lengthy fashion. He is suffering from Alcoholism and reports seeing the devil in a particular corner of the madhouse corridor. The psychiatric diagnosis given is a goaded brain which apparently leads to a faulty excitation of the optic nerve, leading to the disturbed function of sight.
2. Auditory hallucinations: Schön's fellow psychiatrist Dr. Hagen explains different types of auditory hallucinations, grouping and characterizing the hallucinations into “Ohrenklingen und Ohrensausen” (tinnitus) and “Ohrenbrausen und Ohrenprasseln” (sounds likening the sound of a wheel or machine). Furthermore, the reader is informed about the distinction between illusion and hallucination. According to the book, illusions occur due to a misinterpretation and altered perception of an actually existing sound, while hallucinations have no existing external origin and are caused by a faulty excitation of the auditory nerve.
3. Hallucinations of smell, taste and touch: Multiple cases are given regarding hallucinations of these senses. The causes are largely explained by functional physiological abnormalities.
4. Hallucinations of all senses: The case of Carl Stein is discussed again elaborately. It is stated, that his hallucinations extended to all senses over time. The patient believes he is obsessed with the devil telling him to kill himself. The man thus tries to commit suicide several times and is brought to Schön's mental home on several occasions. The author tried to cure the patient by using religious and moral lessons, which never helped. Finally, a metaphor brought the patient to his senses and made him realize the immorality and profanity of taking one's own life. This metaphor ultimately illustrates that one should not let the body and its urges (passions and addiction) take control over one's soul.

=== Various forms of madness ===
Multiple examples of simulating are given and discussed. Simulations of madness are performed to forego punishment after committing a crime. Another motive for simulating behavior includes wanting to prolong the stay in a mental asylum out of comfort. With the presented cases, the public's misconceptions and faulty stereotypical knowledge about 'madness' are uncovered. Schön educates about how to identify 'fakes' and emphasizes that it is impossible to fake madness, even with professional knowledge. Moreover, sleep disturbances like sleepwalking and somnolence are described and different degrees of drunkenness are characterized. Consequently, the similarity of such states to madness is depicted in order to challenge the reader to put one's own sanity into perspective.

=== Kleptomania and pyromania ===
Even in the 19th century, the addiction to steal (kleptomania) was recognized by psychiatrists and Schön describes several cases of affluent members of society with this urge. Furthermore, there seemed to be an urge for arson (pyromania) among many mentally ill. Today, both mental illnesses are listed in the Diagnostic and Statistical Manual of Mental Disorders and are considered types of impulse control disorder.

== Psychiatric approach in the 19th century ==
In the 19th century, a patient's constitution is described with the help of the different temperaments (sanguine, melancholic, phlegmatic and choleric). This incorporation of the four temperaments in personality description reflects the maintenance of Hippocrates medical concept of humorism, which is no longer maintained in modern-day medicine. Physiology is emphasized as a primary cause of the disturbances of the mind. Schön states that the illnesses of the mind can never occur without illness of the body. Visual hallucinations, for example are said to occur due to a heating of the brain, happening when one hears tales and stories of superstitious content. Moreover, autopsies of the time apparently revealed anatomical differences in organs of the suicidal. This shows that psychiatry saw mental problems largely in the bodily organs and not in the content of the mind (thoughts). The prevalent stereotype of the time of insanity being infectious is thus rendered faulty. The book also states several motives for suicide; moral squalidness being identified as a main cause of such behavior. Relatedly, the theologically educated author observed that most of his suicidal cases aren't familiar with the Christian ten commandments, irrespectively of their educational status. Another statement made by Schön refers to the influence of emotions on the bodily organs. Anger is said to take hold of the liver and changes the blood circulation; anxiety and fear are stated to give blood a centrifugal direction and to attack the central organs. Sadness supposedly acts on the heart and the bladder. Meanwhile, bawdiness destroys the brain. This latter belief shows the emphasis of the time on moral chastity. Accordingly, the following recommendation is given to the reader at the end of the book:

Sorge für die Erhaltung deiner körperlichen Gesundheit und enthalte dich von den Leidenschaften, so wirst du auch geistesgesund bleiben.

This is an advice to care for the conservation of the body and to abstain from all passions and urges.

The book also reveals that 19th century psychiatrists with medical education cooperated with a priest in the healing process of the mentally ill. According to Schön, most of his cases suffer from lower moral and religious education and are undevout. Given his theological background, Schön thus stresses that a priest is responsible for the moral education of the patient and saintliness is seen as a way to protect oneself from mental illness. The inclusion of religious staff in the viennese asylum can be contrasted with additions of pathologists in other mental homes. John P. Gray (1825-1886), an American forensic psychiatrist and advocate of physical causes for 'madness', included pathologist staff in his American asylum in Utica. This made his asylum the first of its kind.

Schön's descriptions and analyses mention both moral-religious and physical causes for mental illness. The book thus mirrors the century's dynamic and diverse view on mental illness. While Schön advocates the long-held moral causes for mental illness, he also acknowledges the necessity of physical causes. Additionally, the author's motive of creating more understanding for the 'insane' mirrors the trend of the 18th and 19th century of treating the mentally ill in a more humane manner.

Despite this progressive aspect, the book can also be considered to reflect some old-fashioned, sexist tendencies. Women are said to be of a more nervous, neurotic temper which makes them more likely to suffer from hallucinations- especially from delusions of being a witch. Furthermore, the author comments that a female patient of his was more predisposed to lose her mind, as she was starting her menses at the time. Periodic menstruation and the beginning of menstruation in puberty are also mentioned to play a role in female suicide and arson-addiction. The latter was allegedly caused by ‘darker blood’, which was believed to be more prominent in menstrual women.

To conclude, 'Mittheilungen aus dem Leben Geistesgestörter' can be considered a photograph of the century's knowledge and misconceptions about mental illness. The modern reader can expect to be entertained by the outdated and inaccurate views, as well as impressed by the authors wish to change the stigma surrounding 'insanity'. The novel manages to educate the reader about the development of psychiatry with the use of easy-to-read language and can thus be recommended to the general public and professionals alike.
