= Johann Hast =

German philosopher (1808–1852)

Johann Hast (June 15, 1808 – February 19, 1852) was a German philosopher born in Ottenstein-Ahaus.

He studied philosophy and philology at the Academy of Münster, and afterwards taught classes at a vocational school in Münster. Later in his career, he worked as a bookseller and private journalist in Berlin and Münster, publishing works on philosophy, religion, education, et al. Among his literary works were two books involving Hermesian philosophy:

- Hauptmomente der Hermesischen Philosophie (Key points of Hermesian philosophy), (1832)
- Über das Fürwahrhalten der theoretischen und das Fürwahrannehmen der praktischen Vernunft im Hermesischen Systeme (On theoretical truths and perceptions of practical reason in Hermesianism).

He was the author of a critique on Güntherianism called Über das historische Auffassen und wissenschaftliche Erfassen des Christentums. Ein Beitrag zur Würdigung der Spekulation der Güntherschen Schule (On the historical understanding and realization of Christianity, an article of evaluation regarding speculative Güntherianism).

Hast died in Münster on February 19, 1852, at the age of 43.
