= Theodor Gangauf =

German Catholic theologian

Theodor Gangauf (November 1, 1809 – September 15, 1875) was a German Catholic theologian born in Bergen, Bavaria.

He received his ordination in 1833, and in 1836 joined the Benedictine Order in Augsburg. From 1841 until his death in 1875 he was a professor of philosophy at the Lyceum at Augsburg. In the meantime (1851 to 1859), he also served as abbot at St. Stephen's Abbey.

Gangauf was a follower of Anton Günther's philosophical system, and an advocate of Augustinian theology. He was the author of two noted works on St. Augustine:

- Metaphysische Psychologie des heiligen Augustinus (Metaphysical psychology of St. Augustine), 1852
- Des heiligen Augustinus speculative Lehre von Gott dem Dreieinigen (St. Augustine's speculative doctrine of a Triune God), 1865
