= Jakob Merten =

Jakob Merten (August 11, 1809 – February 22, 1872) was a German Catholic theologian born in Wittlich.

He studied theology in Trier, where in 1833 he received his ordination. Subsequently, he became a chaplain in Trier, where he worked closely with Franz Peter Knoodt (1811–1889). From 1843 to 1868 he was a professor of philosophy at the Episcopal Seminary in Trier.

Initially a prominent follower of Anton Günther's philosophy, Merten eventually abandoned Güntherianism as his career progressed. He was author of an essay on Güntherian philosophy titled Hauptfragen der Metaphysik in Verbindung mit der Speculation (Primary Questions of Metaphysics in Association with Speculation) (1840). Other noted works by Merten include:

- Grundriss der Metaphysik, (Outline of metaphysics); 1848.
- Der selige Frings und sein Freund als Antigüntherianer; 1852.
- Bemerkungen zur Metaphysik von Balmes, (Remarks on the metaphysics of Balmes); 1859.
