= Lay theologian =

Unordained or untrained professional religious scholar

A lay theologian is a theologian "who is not ordained, or a theologian who has not been trained as a theologian". Despite not being trained as theologian or ordained, lay theologians may have academic qualifications in other disciplines.

== Examples ==
Notable lay theologians include:

- George Abbot
- Mortimer J. Adler
- Ethan Allen
- Joseph T. Bayly
- Edward Musgrave Blaiklock
- Nicholas Cabasilas
- G. K. Chesterton
- James F. Colaianni
- Nicolas Gomez Davila
- Fyodor Dostoevsky
- Jacques Ellul
- Thomas Erskine
- Jim Forest
- Rosemary Haughton
- Susan Howatch
- Aleksey Khomyakov
- John Lennox
- C. S. Lewis
- David Lodge
- Robert Magliola
- Marko Marulić
- Isaac Newton
- Johann Heinrich Pabst
- Paracelsus
- Caspar Peucer
- Dorothy L. Sayers
- Frank Sheed
- Uwe Siemon-Netto
- William Stringfellow
- Emanuel Swedenborg
- Maisie Ward
