= Nepomucký =

Nepomucký (feminine: Nepomucká) is a Czech surname or epithet literally meaning 'from Nepomuk'.

- Jan Nepomucký, the native Czech name of John of Nepomuk, a saint
- Karel Nepomucký, Czech footballer
- Krystyna Nepomucka (1920–2015), Polish writer

Also, "Jan Nepomucký" could be a compound given name:

- Jan S. Kolár, christened Jan Nepomucký Josef Kohn
- John Neumann, christened Jan Nepomucký Neumann
- Karel VI Schwarzenberg (1911–1986), christened Karel Bedřich Maria Josef Jan Nepomucký Cyril Metoděj
- Karel Schwarzenberg (1937–2023), christened Karel Jan Nepomucký Josef Norbert Bedřich Antonín Vratislav Menas

== See also ==
- Giovanni Nepomuceno, Italian double given name
- Jan Nepomuk, another Czech version of the given name
- Jan Nepomucen, Polish version of the given name
- Juan Nepomuceno, Spanish version of the given name
- Nepomuceno (surname)
