= Johann Nepomuk von Kutschera =

Baron Johann Nepomuk von Kutschera (1766 in Prague – 20 April 1832 in Vienna) was an Austrian general. He served as Field Marshal Lieutenant from 1813 and as Feldzeugmeister in 1832. He previously served as principal aide-de-camp to Emperor Francis as well as the Emperor's most important adviser on military affairs for several years. Of Bohemian origin, his family was ennobled in 1805. He was raised to baronial rank in 1819 and became a privy councillor in 1823, and received numerous other honours.
