= Johann Nepomuk Schödlberger =

Austrian painter (1779–1853)

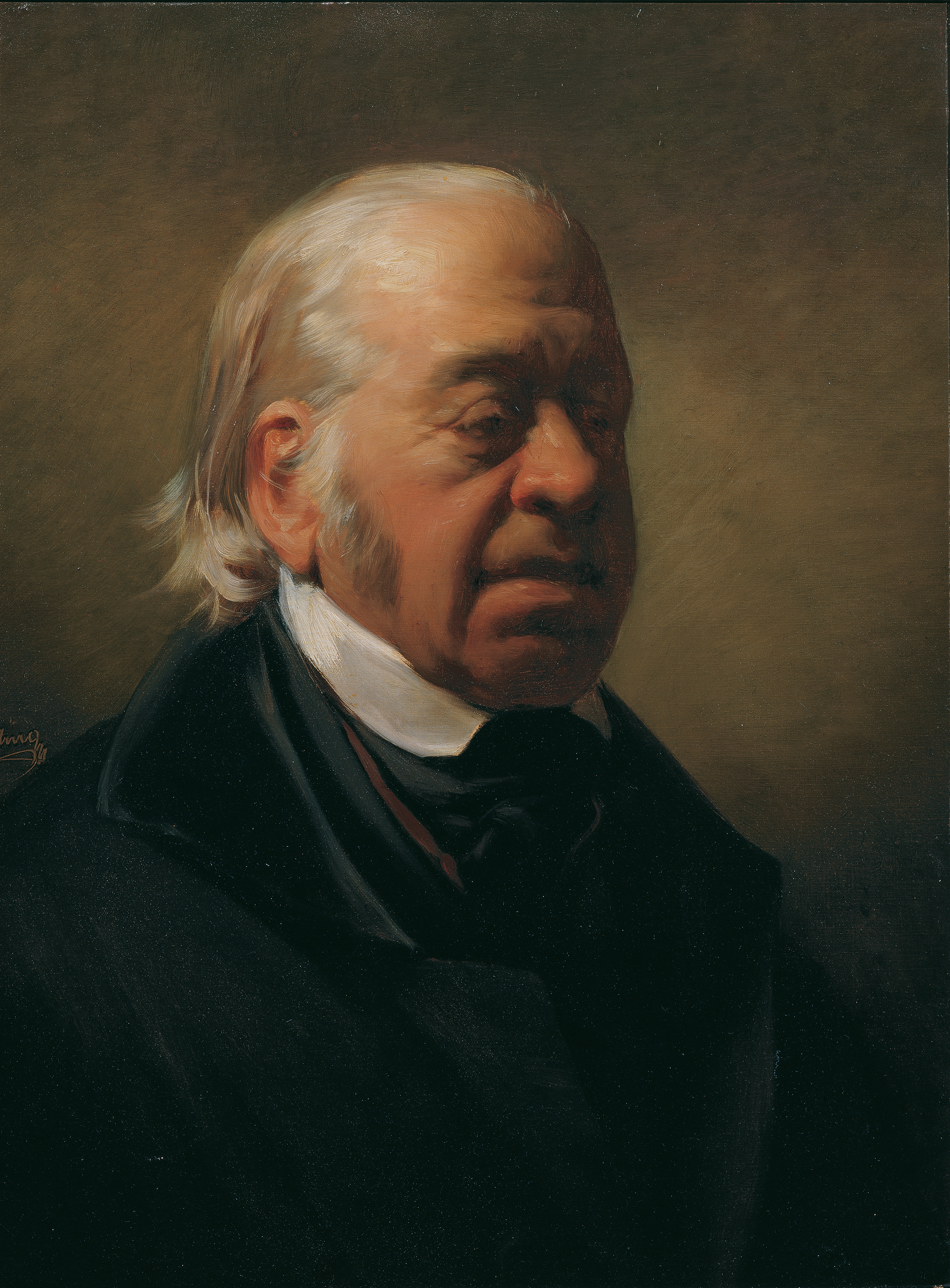
Johann Nepomuk Schödlberger; portrait by Friedrich von Amerling (1852)

Johann Nepomuk Schödlberger (22 May 1779 – 26 January 1853) was an Austrian painter who specialized in landscapes; often with figures. He was largely self-taught.

== Biography ==
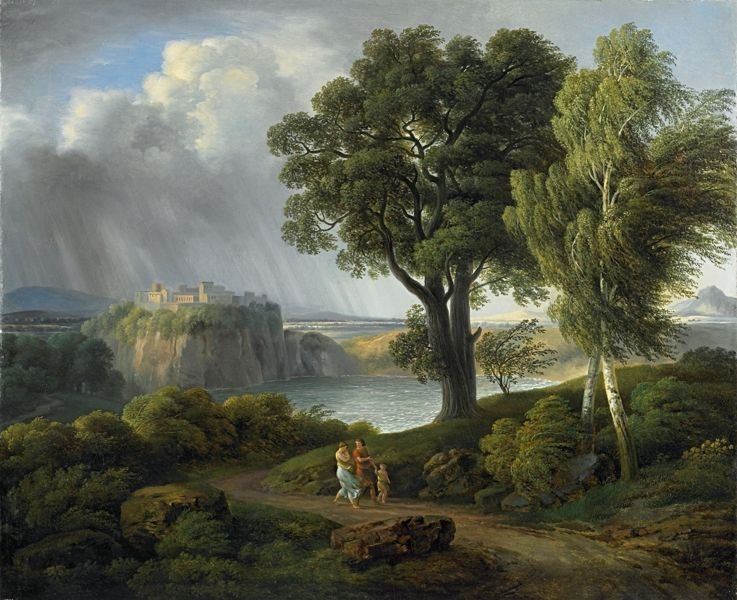
Arcadian Landscape

Schödlberger was born on 22 May 1779 in Vienna. He was born in poverty but his talent for art developed early. Before he could write, he could draw and was teaching other children. He began attending secondary school at the age of eight and it was not until four years later that he received his first formal art instruction. His studies were completed at the age of eighteen and he became a substitute drawing teacher at a local school. Two years later, he began teaching at a Hauptschule in Neubau. He initially shared a room with Anton Petter, who would later become Director of the Academy of Fine Arts.

In 1803, he took his first painting excursion to Upper Austria and Salzburg. It was the first time he had seen such landscapes in person, rather than vicariously through the works of other artists. His desire to learn more was such that he went to Dresden solely to visit the Gemäldegalerie Alte Meister and copy two works each by Claude Lorrain and Jacob van Ruisdael.

Around this time, his original works caught the attention of a certain Count Lambert, who purchased a few and provided some much needed publicity. Soon, he became generally popular among the nobility, including Emperor Francis II.

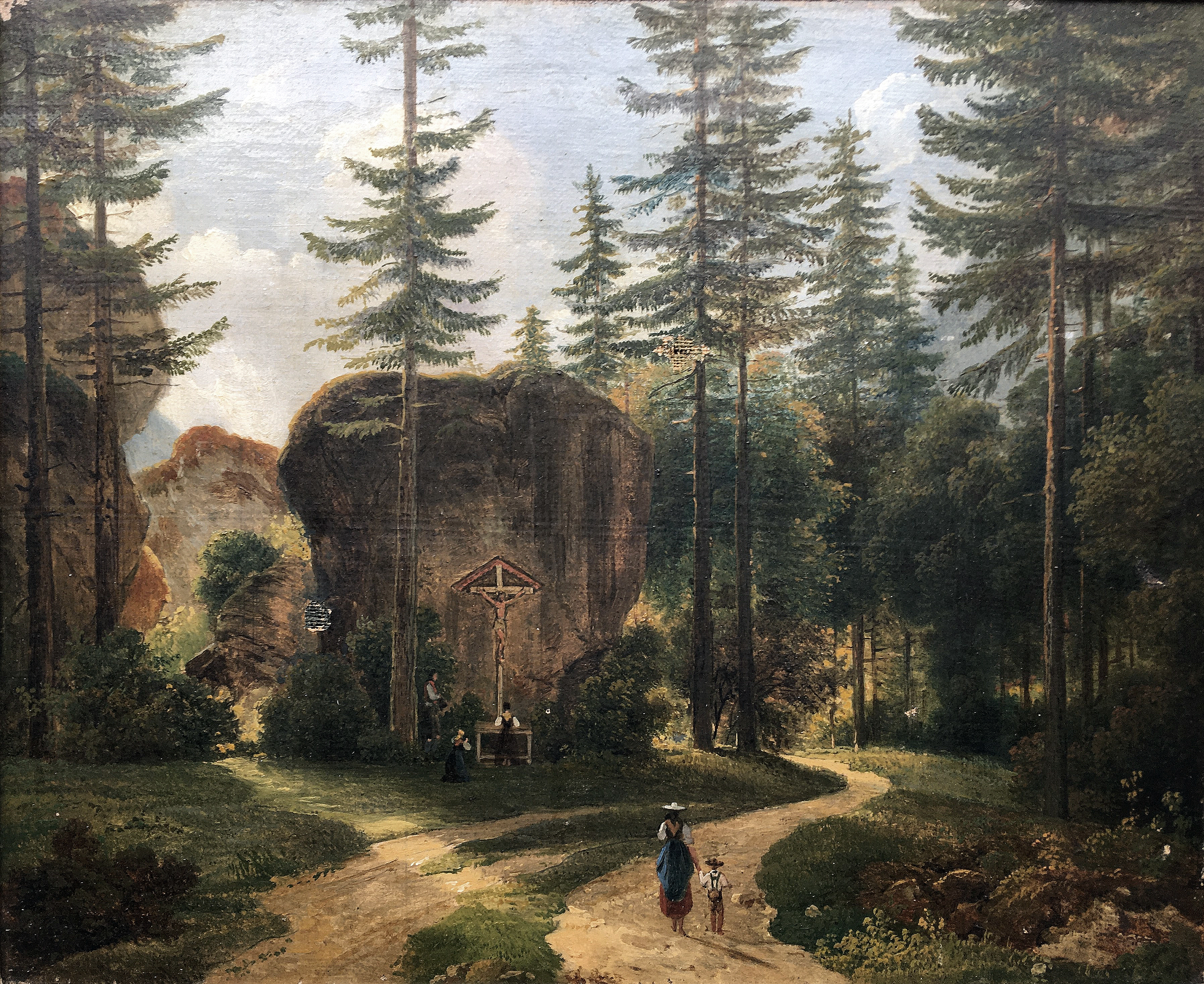
Rock monolith "Kreuzstein" in the Echern Valley, near Hallstatt (1834)

In 1815, he was elected to the Academy of Fine Arts and became a teacher there the following year. One of his best known students was Ferdinand Georg Waldmüller. In 1817 and 1818, he undertook a major painting trip to Italy; visiting Rome, Naples and Florence. The Emperor was so impressed with the results that he arranged to have some of his earlier works placed in the Belvedere.

Later, King Ludwig I of Bavaria would provide him with major commissions. It has been said that the quality of his work decreased as his earnings increased.

Schödlberger died on 26 January 1853 in Vienna.
