= Pero Niño =

Castallian privateer (1378-1453)

Pero Niño (1378–1453) was a Castilian privateer at the service of Henry III the Sufferer active in the Mediterranean and the Atlantic during the first decade of the 15th century. He later served John II.

== Biography ==
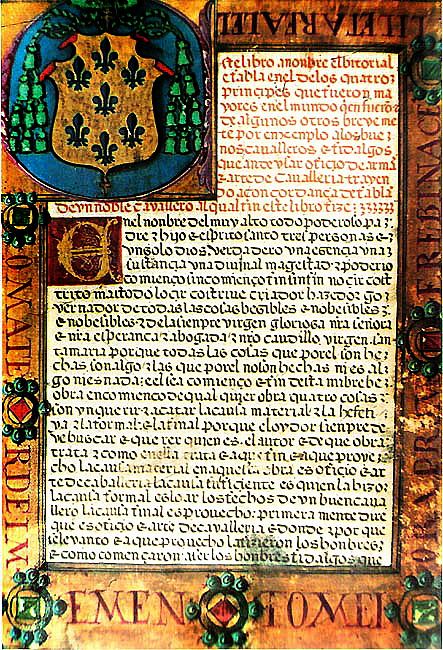
Cover of El Victorial

He was born in 1378. After fighting in the 1394 Siege of Gijón, he took part in the Castilian-Portuguese war between 1396 and 1399. He led a Mediterranean naval expedition in 1404–1405, getting to attack Tunis. Later in 1405–1406, he led an Atlantic campaign, raiding English settlements close to Bordeaux, Jersey, and Poole Harbour. He took part in a military campaign against the Nasrid Kingdom of Granada, fighting for the then regent of Castile Ferdinand, brother of Henry III, in Ronda and Setenil.

He died on 17 January 1453.

El Victorial, a biographical chronicle on Pero Niño, was written by Gutierre Díaz de Games circa 1435–1448.

== Bibliography ==
- Beltrán, Rafael (2013). "El caballero en el mar: don Pero Niño, conde de Buelna, entre el Mediterráneo y el Atlántico". Erebea (in Spanish) (3). Huelva: Universidad de Huelva. Servicio de Publicaciones. doi:10.33776/erebea.v0i3.2299. hdl:10272/7671. ISSN 0214-0691.
- Ferrer i Mallol, María Teresa (1968). "Els corsaris castellans i la campanya de Pero Niño al Mediterrani. Documents sobre "El Victorial"". Anuario de Estudios Medievales (in Catalan). 5. Madrid: Consejo Superior de Investigaciones Científicas: 265. ISSN 1988-4230. Archived from the original (PDF) on 2017-08-16.
- Rábade Obradó, María del Pilar (2016). "Justas, fiestas y protagonismos: Alegrías y placeres en El Victorial de Gutierre Díaz de Games" (PDF). Espacio, Tiempo y Forma. Serie III, Historia Medieval (in Spanish). 29. Universidad Nacional de Educación a Distancia: 675–698. doi:10.5944/etfiii.29.2016.16754. ISSN 0214-9745.
