= Bernhard Afinger =

German sculptor

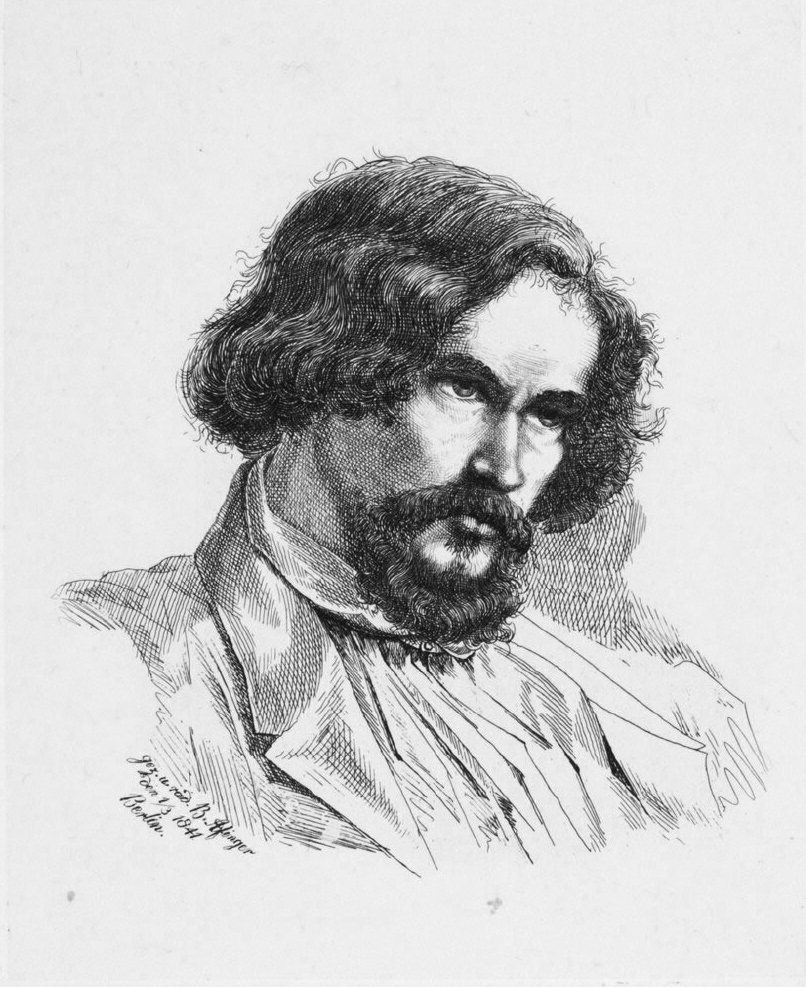
- Born: 6 May 1813
- Died: 5 December 1882 (aged 69)

Bernhard Afinger (6 May 1813 – 25 December 1882) was a German sculptor.

== Biography ==
Afinger was born in Nuremberg, where he studied old German sculptures. He was for a time a silversmith, and in 1840 began instruction under Christian Daniel Rauch at Berlin. Among his pupils was Rudolf Uffrecht. He died in Berlin, aged 69.

== Works ==
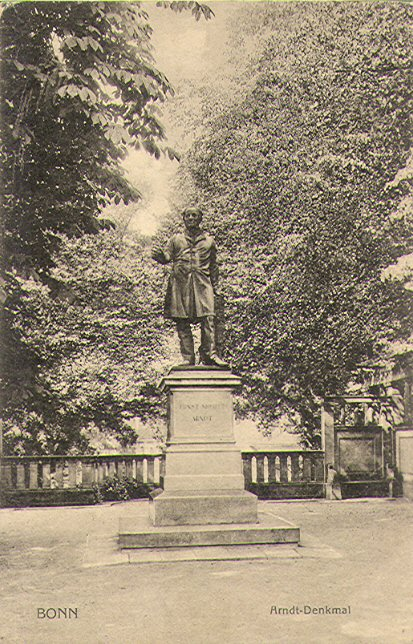
Monument to Ernst Moritz Arndt, 1865, Bonn

In portrait medallions and works of a religious character he was particularly successful. There is an Arndt memorial by him at Bonn, a university memorial at Greifswald, and a statue of Newton in the National Museum, Pesth.
