= Franz Xaver Schmid =

Austrian-German educator and philosopher

Franz Xaver Schmid; name sometimes given as Franz Xaver Schmid-Schwarzenberg (22 October 1819 – 28 November 1883) was an Austrian-German educator and philosopher born in Schwarzenberg am Böhmerwald.

From 1840 to 1844 he studied Catholic theology in Salzburg, receiving his doctorate of philosophy several years later (1850) in Freiburg im Breisgau. Afterwards he taught classes in history and philosophy at the Lyceum in Rastatt. In 1856 he became a lecturer at the University of Erlangen, where he subsequently became an associate professor of philosophy and pedagogy. During the 1850s, Schmid left the Catholic faith and embraced Protestantism. He died in Munich on 28 November 1883.

In 1871 at Erlangen he introduced the Verein für Volkserziehung, which was essentially a child care center aimed at providing education and supervision for young boys. Success of the project eventually led to similar institutions being set up in other Bavarian cities; Augsburg (1878), Munich (1881), Fürth (1883) and Bamberg (1884). Schmid was the author of numerous works on religious philosophy and education; some of his better known publications are as follows:

- Christliche Religionsphilosophie (Christian philosophy of religion), (1857)
- Philosophische pædagogik in Umrisse (Outline of philosophical pedagogy), (1858)
- René Descartes (1859)
- Entwurf eines Systems der Philosophie auf pneumatologischer Grundlage (Design of a philosophical system based on pneumatology), (1863–1868, 3 volumes)
- Über Volkserziehung (On public education) (1879)
- Clytia, a paedagogische Novelle (Clythia, an Educational Novel), (1880)
- Sonnenblumenkerne, Denkverfe für deutsche Knaben ("Sunflower seeds", Denkverfe for German boys), (1883)
- Catechism der Gerechtigkeit (Catechism of justice), (1883)
