= Johann Nepomuk Fuchs =

Johann Nepomuk Fuchs may refer to:

- Johann Nepomuk Fuchs (architect) (1727–1804), Lower Styrian church architect
- Johann Nepomuk Fuchs (composer) (1842–1899), Austrian composer and conductor
- Johann Nepomuk von Fuchs (1774–1856), German chemist and mineralogist, known as Johann Nepomuk Fuchs until 1854
