= Giovanni Nepomuceno =

Giovanni Nepomuceno is an Italian-language given name given as a tribute to John of Nepomuk. Notable people with the name include:

- Giovanni Nepomuceno Della Croce (1736–1819), Italian painter
- Ferdinand I of the Two Sicilies (1751–1825) Ferdinando Antonio Pasquale Giovanni Nepomuceno Serafino Gennaro Benedetto di Borbone
- Archduke Johann Salvator of Austria (1852–1911) was Christened Giovanni Nepomuceno Maria Annunziata Giuseppe Giovanni Batista Ferdinando Baldassare Luigi Gonzaga Pietro Alessandrino Zanobi Antonino

== See also ==
- Nepomuceno (surname)
- Jan Nepomucen, the Polish version of the given name
- Juan Nepomuceno, Spanish version
- Johann Nepomuk, German version of the given name
- Nepomucký, includes the Czech version of the given name
