= Johann Nepomuk Oischinger =

German Roman Catholic theologian and philosopher

Johann Nepomuk Paul Oischinger (13 May 1817 – 11 December 1876) was a German Roman Catholic theologian and philosopher who was a native of Wittmannsberg (Gotteszell), Bavaria.

Oischinger studied theology and philosophy at the Ludwig-Maximilians-Universität München, where he had as instructors Franz Xaver von Baader (1765–1841), Joseph Görres (1776–1848), Friedrich Wilhelm Joseph Schelling (1775–1854), Ignaz von Döllinger (1799–1890), Heinrich Klee (1800–1840), Johann Adam Möhler (1796–1838) and Franz Xaver Reithmayr (1809–1872). In 1841, he received his ordination in Regensburg, and shortly afterward returned to Munich, where he worked as a private scholar and journalist for the remainder of his career.

His aim in theology was to create a new philosophical system and a scientific offering of Catholic doctrinal concepts, and with the new system he proposed the elimination of what he considered erroneous medieval scholastic features. A number of his writings were harsh criticisms of medieval scholastic theology, in particular the belief system of Thomas Aquinas. He was also the author of polemical writings aimed at contemporary movements that included Neo-Scholasticism and Güntherianism. A few of his numerous publications are as follows:

- Grundriss zu einem neuen Systeme der Philosophie (Framework of a New System of Philosophy), 1843
- Philosophie und Religion (1849)
- Grundriss zum systeme der christlichen Philosophie (Framework for a System of Christian Philosophy), 1852
- Die Einheitslehre der göttlichen Trinität (Doctrine of the Anthropomorphic Trinity), 1869
