= Johann Spörlein =

German Catholic church historian

Johann Spörlein (January 7, 1814 – November 19, 1873) was a German Catholic church historian who was a native of Burk, today a neighborhood in the city of Forchheim. He was a prominent supporter of philosopher Anton Günther (1783–1863).

He studied philosophy and theology in Bamberg, receiving his ordination in 1837. From February 1849, he was a professor of church history and church law at the Lyceum in Bamberg. Among his written works are the following:

- Einige Grundsätze des Clemens von Alexandrien über griechische Philosophie und christliche Wissenschaft, aus seinen Schriften dargelegt (Some principles of Clement of Alexandria on Greek philosophy and Christian science, explained from his writings), 1840
- Die Gegensätze in der Lehre des hl. Cyrillus und des Nestorius von der Menschwerdung Gottes (Contradictions in the teaching of St. Cyril and Nestorius on the incarnation of God), 1853
- Briefe über die Günther'sche Philosophie Von einem katholischen Gottesgelehrten (Letters on Günther's philosophy from a Catholic scholar of God), 1855
- Die Verfolgung der Christen im römischen Reiche (The persecution of Christians in the Roman Empire), 1858
- Die christliche Gesellschaftsordnung und die neue Zeit (The Christian social order and the New Era), 1866
