= Juan Nepomuceno Niño =

Colombian lawyer and politician (1769–1816)

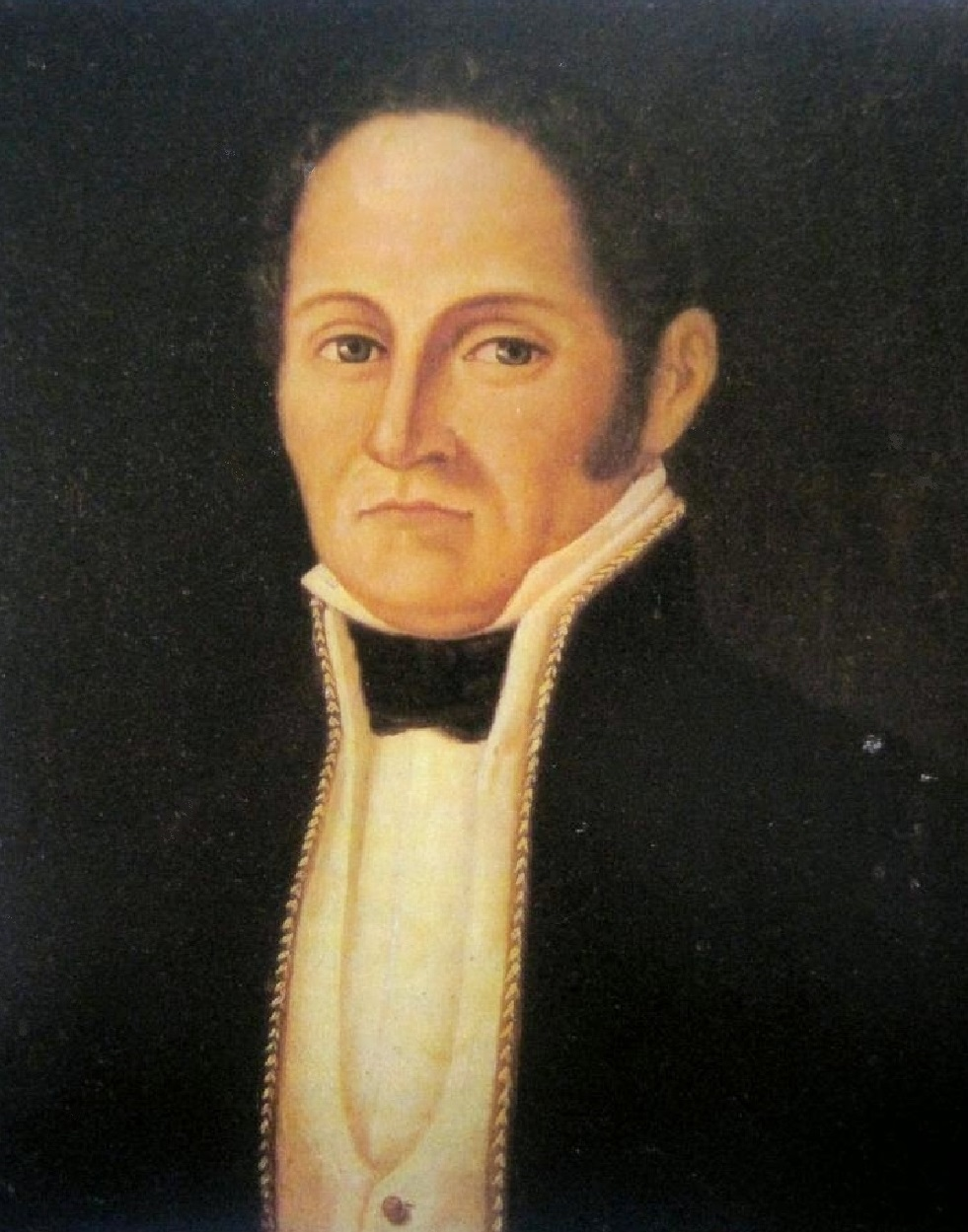

1st Governor of the Republic of Tunja
- In office October 18, 1811 – June 1, 1816

vice president of the Higher Government Board of the Province of Tunja

Personal details
- Born: June 13, 1769 Tunja
- Died: November 29, 1816 (aged 47) Tunja
- Cause of death: Executed
- Spouse: María Teresa Camacho Lago

Juan Nepomuceno Niño Muelle y Lago (Tunja, June 13, 1769 – Tunja, November 29, 1816) was a philosopher, lawyer, and politician from the Viceroyalty of New Granada (present-day Colombia). He is known as one of the heroes and martyrs of the independence of Colombia shot on November 29, 1816, during the reconquest of New Granada by order of Pablo Morillo.

Niño was born in Tunja on June 13, 1769 on a big mansion. He was the son of Juan Agustín Niño y Álvarez and María Catarina Muelle y Lago. He began his academic journey in 1781 by enrolling in the prestigious Real Colegio Mayor de Nuestra Señora del Rosario de Santafé for high school. Niño was a brilliant student and earned a degree in philosophy in 1787. By the age of 21, he had obtained his Licentiate and Doctorate in Canon Law, which is a testament to his intellectual prowess.

In 1809, Juan Nepomuceno returned to his hometown of Tunja, where he was appointed mayor. He was also selected as a candidate for the Spanish courts, representing the Viceroyalty of New Granada, along with José Joaquín Camacho. While waiting for this appointment and practicing law in Tunja, the Viceroy in Santafé was dismissed on July 20, 1810, which led to an open town hall meeting being held in Tunja on July 26, 1810.

This meeting resulted in the installation of a Government Board, of which Juan Nepomuceno Niño became one of its initial members. His outstanding leadership qualities and legal acumen made him a natural choice for the position. On October 18, 1810, he was elected as vice president of the Superior Government Board, which governed the province of Tunja. Later, on December 18, 1810, his father Juan Agustín Niño y Álvarez became the deputy for Tunja, and Juan Nepomuceno Niño for Gámbita.

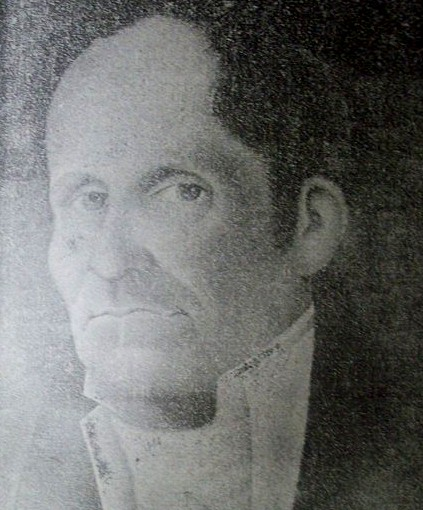

It promoted the creation of the Constitution of the Republic of Tunja. Approved on December 9, 1811, in the first Constituent Assembly of the State, declaring the independence of the Kingdom of Spain and proclaiming the Republic of Tunja on December 10, 1813. He was named the first president of the Republic of Tunja. He was the first governor of the Republic of Tunja, and vice president of the Superior Government Board of the former province of Tunja.

He confronted Antonio Nariño, and although the latter always tried to avoid this civil war, they even signed treaties and negotiated agreements that in the end only remained on paper, Niño's pride and the congress' desire for power left no other way out than the war between Tunja and Cundinamarca. In the following years the federalist process was losing strength in the face of centralism under the government of the Kingdom of Spain. The centralist alternative, led by the Bogotá elite, proposed political-administrative centralization, without a clear separation from Spain, under the authority of the King.

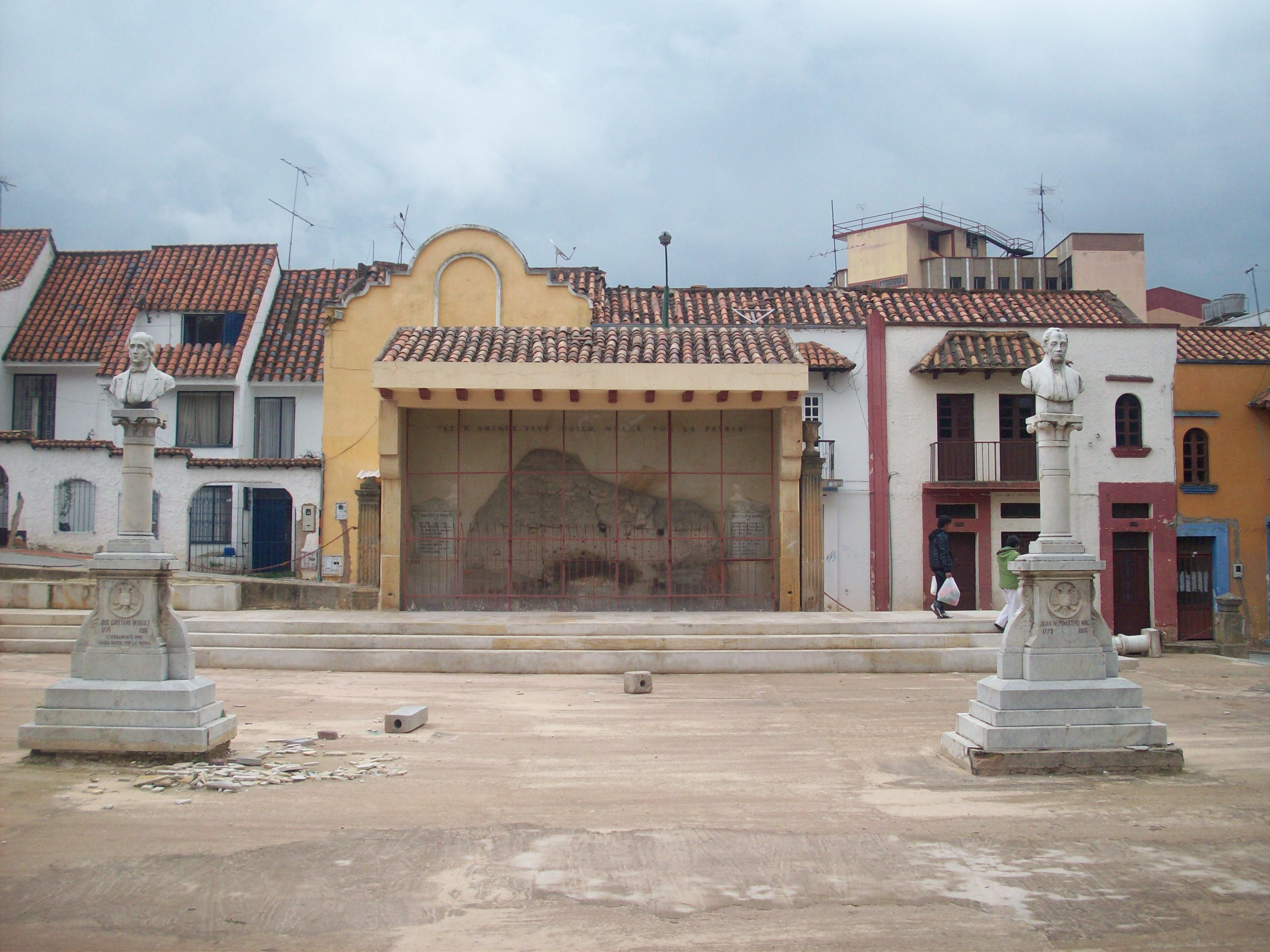
Wall of the martyrs and monument to Juan Nepomuceno Niño

In 1816 he had to hide after the royalist invasion during the reconquest of the territory, although he was finally arrested and taken to Santafe, where he spent a long time in prison along with other revolutionaries. On September 14, the court-martial took his statement and sentenced him to death. On November 29, 1816, the sentence was carried out by shooting him, along with other federalists, at the Paredón de los Mártires.

After his death, his body was buried in a common grave situated in the Church of San Laureano, where it remained for a century. However, during the festivities held to celebrate Colombia's Centennial of Independence, his remains were unearthed and moved to the Cathedral of Tunja. In order to honor his memory, a new grave was prepared for him, and an inscription was placed on it which reads: "He who dies for his country lives eternally."

== Family ==
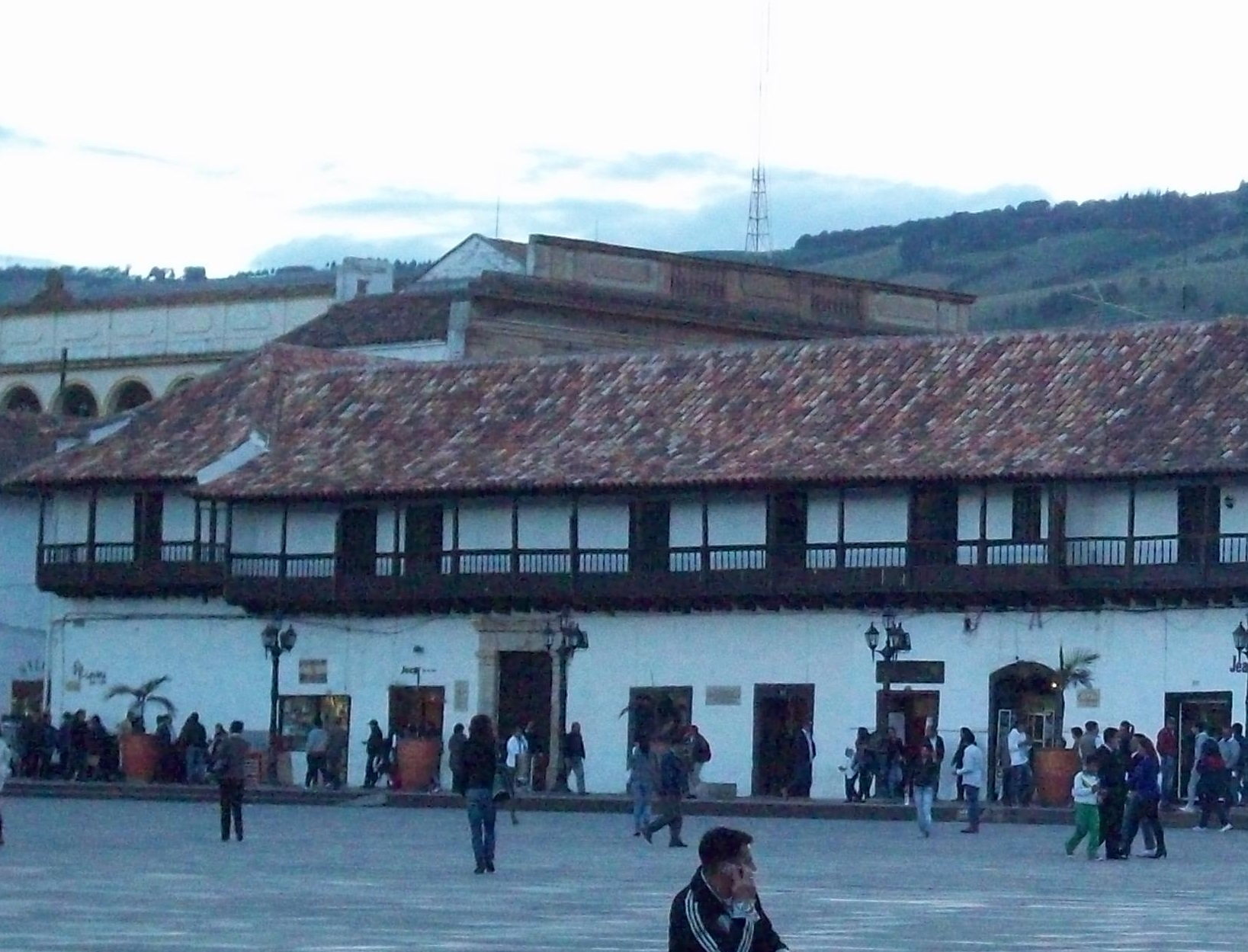
Palace-house of Juan Agustín Niño y Álvarez in the center of Tunja, Colombia.

He comes from a family of shipowners known as the Niño Brothers, who hailed from the Spanish port of Moguer. They were the ones who financed and provided the caravel called La Niña for Christopher Columbus's first voyage. In New Granada and the subsequent viceroyalty, his family held positions as encomenderos, officers, governors and corregidores. His father and Juan Nepomuceno can trace their lineage directly back to the navigator Pedro Alonso Niño, passing through his great-grandson Martín Niño Rojas, an encomendero of Ocusá, Sátiva and Suta, until finally reaching Juan Agustín Niño and his son Juan Nepomuceno, who were made martyrs during the Independence of Colombia, they were relatives of Francisco Niño and Juan Niño.

He married María Teresa Camacho Lago in Fontibón on September 22, 1791. This marriage resulted in the birth of 11 children, namely Marcos Antonio, Francisco Antonio, Catalina, Manuela, María Dolores, Ana Joaquina, Nepomuceno Ambrosio, José María, María Josefa, Bárbara Josefa, and Manuel María Niño Camacho.

The descendants of Juan Nepomuceno Niño followed in his footsteps, beginning with his son Francisco and then his grandson, Pedro Alonso Niño. The latter conquered and settled in the province of Santa Marta before moving to Tunja, where he started a family and gave rise to the Niño lineage in New Granada, which is now present-day Colombia. Over time, members of this family played a significant role in the New Kingdom of Granada and the eventual Independence of Colombia.

== Bibliography ==
- Acuña Rodríguez, Olga Yanet: 'The Independence of the province of Tunja seen through the ideology of Juan Nepomuceno Niño and José Joaquín Camacho, 1810–1815.', HiSTOReLo. Magazine of regional and local history, ISSN-e 2145-132X, Vol. 4, No. 7, 2012, pp. 188–217.
- Martínez Martín, Abel Fernando and Otálora Cascante, Andrés Ricardo: 'He who dies for the country lives eternally. The Centenary of the Martyrs, Tunja, Colombia (1916)', Magazine of American History, ISSN-e 2663-371X, ISSN 0034-8325, No. 154, 2018 (Issue dedicated to: American History Magazine No. 154 (January–June 2018)), pp. 81–104.
- History and Antiquities Bulletin, Volume 6, Issues 61–72. Colombian Academy of History.
