= Johann Emanuel Veith =

Bohemian Roman Catholic preacher

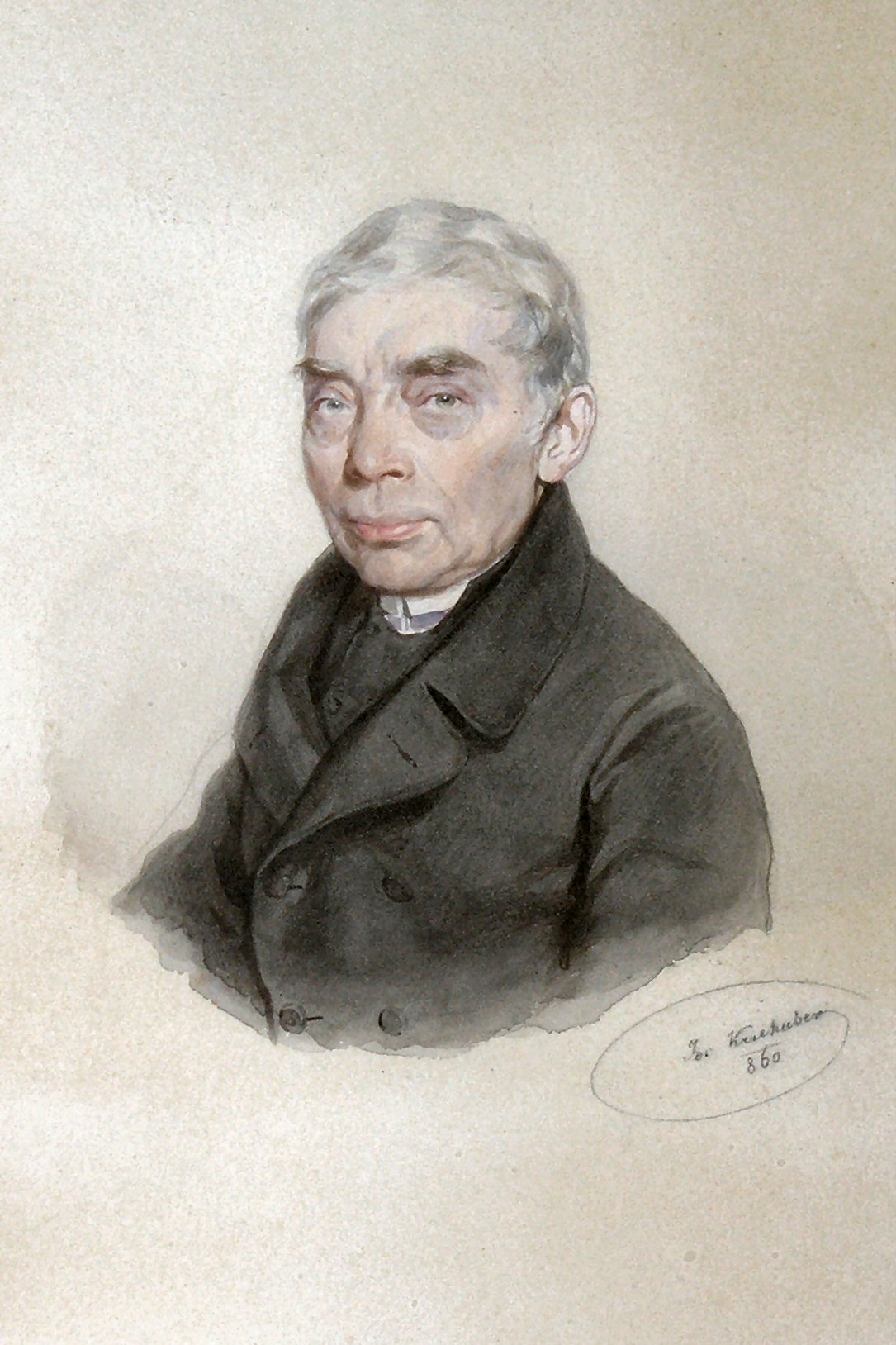
Johann Emanuel Veith, 1860

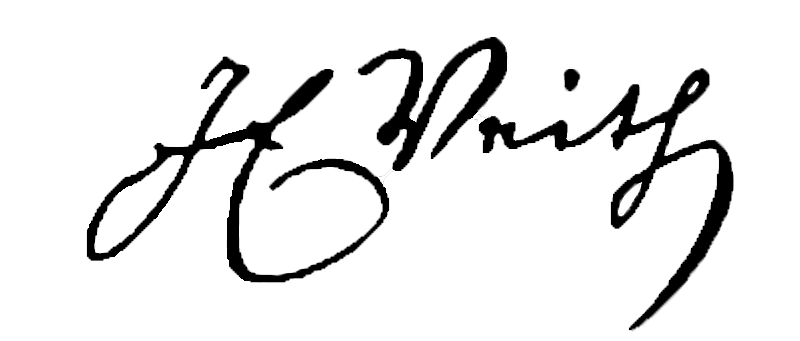
Signature of Johann Emanuel Veith

Johann Emanuel Veith (1787 – 6 November 1876) was a Bohemian Roman Catholic preacher. He was heavily influenced by the liberal theology of Anton Günther.

== Life ==
He was born of Jewish parents at Kuttenplan, Bohemia, in 1787.

In 1801 he took the philosophical course at the University of Prague, and later studied medicine. In 1808 he obtained a degree in medicine at Vienna; in a short time he was professor and then director of the school of veterinary medicine.

He wrote poetry, and a play of his was acted in one of the theatres of Vienna. He also published a compendium in two volumes of veterinary surgery, and an outline of botanical medicine. In 1816 he became a Christian convert, and in 1817 began the study of theology. He also became a personal friend of Father Hofbauer, was his physician, and was urged by him to devote himself to preaching, after ordination.

Veith was ordained, 26 August 1821, and the next month joined the Redemptorists at Maria Stiegen. He was a Redemptorist preacher at Maria Stiegen, 1821–30; preacher at the Cathedral of St. Stephen, 1831–45; retired cathedral preacher, until his total blindness, 1845–63; finally, a writer of ascetic devotional works until his death. Veith died in Vienna and was buried in the Matzleinsdorf Protestant Cemetery.

== Works ==
His sermons exist in manuscript up to 1825; their publication began with:

- "Die Leidenswerkzeuge Christi" (1826);
- "Die Worte der Feinde Christi" (1827);
- "Das Friedensopfer" (1828);
- "Lebensbilder aus der Passionsgeschichte" (1829);
- "Das Vater Unser" (1830);
- "Die heiligen Berge" (1821);
- "Der verlorne Sohn" (1832);
- "Die Samaritin" (1833);
- "Die Erweckung des Lazarus" (1842);
- "Mater dolorosa" (1843);
- "Die Heilung des Blindgeborenen" (1844);
- "Eucharistia" (1846);
- "Die Säulen der Kirche" (1847);
- "Misericordia" (1848);
- "Politische Passionspredigten" (1849);
- "Weitleben und Christentum" (1850);
- "Charitas" (1851);
- "Der Weg, die Wahrheit, und das Leben" (1854);
- "Prophetie und Glaube" (1855);
- "Die sechs Fastensonntage nach ihren Kalendernamen" (1857);
- "Die Perikopen-Reihen der sechs Fastwochen" (1858);
- "Die Mächten des Unheils" (1859);
- "Die zwölf Stufenpsalmen" (1862);
- "Die Anfange der Menschenweit" (1863).

Among his homilies are:

- "Homiletische Vorträge für die Sonn-und Festtage" (7 vols.);
- "Homilienkranz für das katholische Kirchenjahr" (5 vols);
- "Vorträge über die sonntäglischen Perikopen von Advent bis Pfingsten".

Among his collections of homilies are to be found sermons on the feast days of the ecclesiastical year; he also published sermons of this class in two vols.:

- "Festpredigten, zumeist in einer Doppelreihe".

Of the sermons on special occasions are:

- "Die Cholerapredigt" (1831); and
- "Austrias Trauer, Drei Reden bei den Exequien für Kaiser Franz I" (1835).

Veith took pains to give his sermons form; their language is classic. In the third part of his "Erzählungen und Humoresken" he gives the "Aphorismen für Diener der Kirche von einem Kirchendiener".

In the summer of 1869 Veith received an English translation of his "Leidenswerkzeuge" from Theodore Noethen, parish priest at Albany, U.S.A., the work itself being published at Boston.

He published three prayer-books:

- "Jesus meine Liebe";
- "Erkenntnis und Liebe";
- "Christus gestern, heute, und ewig".

From 1863 Veith was both blind and deaf. He could not preach, but he wrote lectures on spiritual exercises for publication, and supplemented and completed his books of meditations:

- "Denkbüchlein von Leiden Christi";
- "Erklärender Text zu Führichs 15 Mysterien des Rosenkranzes";
- "Meditationen über den 118. Psalm";
- "Hundert Psalmen";
- "Der Leidensweg des Herrn";
- "Die Epistelreihe des Kirchenjahres in ihrem Verhaltnisse zu den Evangelien";
- the posthumous work "Koheleth und Hoheslied".

- Systematische Beschreibung der vorzüglichsten in Oesterreich wildwachsenden, oder in Gärten gewöhnlichen Arzneygewächse, mit besonderer Rücksicht auf die neue oesterreichische Provincial-Pharmacopoe : für studirende Mediziner, Wundärzte und Pharmaceuten an der Wiener Universität . Geistinger, Wien 1813 Digital edition by the University and State Library Düsseldorf
