= Bernstein's Fish Grotto =

Restaurant in San Francisco, California (1912–1981)

Coordinates: 37.78593°N 122.40796°W

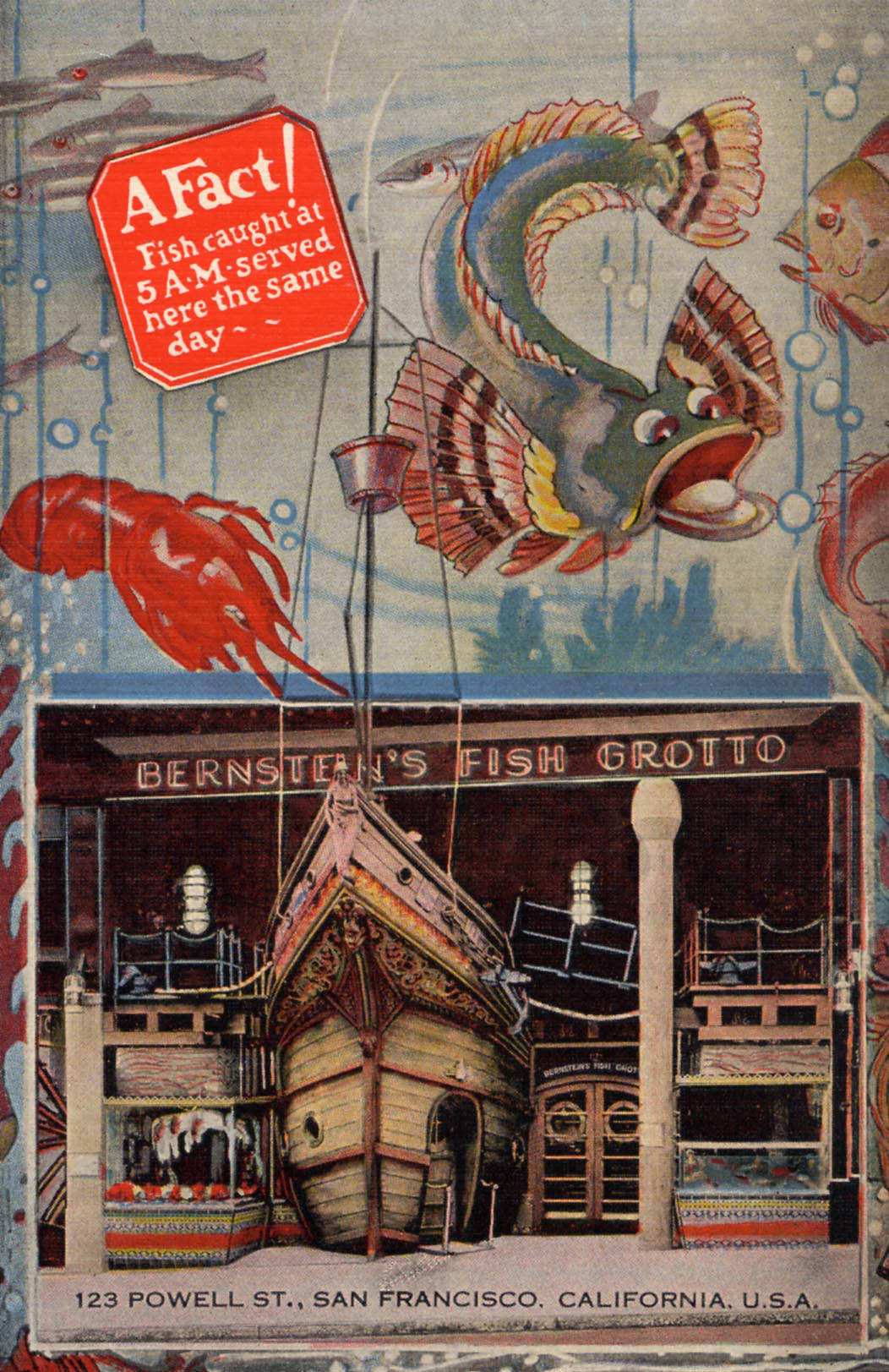
Bernstein's Fish Grotto, 1940s postcard

Bernstein's Fish Grotto was a popular restaurant in San Francisco, California, that operated from 1912 to 1981.

== Description ==
Opened by Maurice Bernstein (1886-1932) in 1912, Bernstein's Fish Grotto was known for its unique entrance, a ship's bow jutting into the sidewalk. It was intended to be a reproduction of Christopher Columbus' ship Niña. Inside the restaurant, the marine theme continued. Bernstein's had seven dining rooms styled to look like ship's cabins: the Fisherman's Cave, the Pilot Room, the Sun Deck, the Main Salon, the Cabin Nooks, the Upper Deck, and the Porthole Counter. The sister restaurant in Los Angeles, was also known for its Coo-Coo Clams from Coo-Coo Cove.

Located at 123 Powell Street, near the end of the cable car line, the Grotto was a popular tourist attraction for many years.

Bernstein's Fish Grotto closed in 1981.
