= Wharf of the Caravels =

Maritime museum in Palos de la Frontera, Spain

Coordinates: 37.2104°N 6.9270°W

- Muelle de las Carabelas
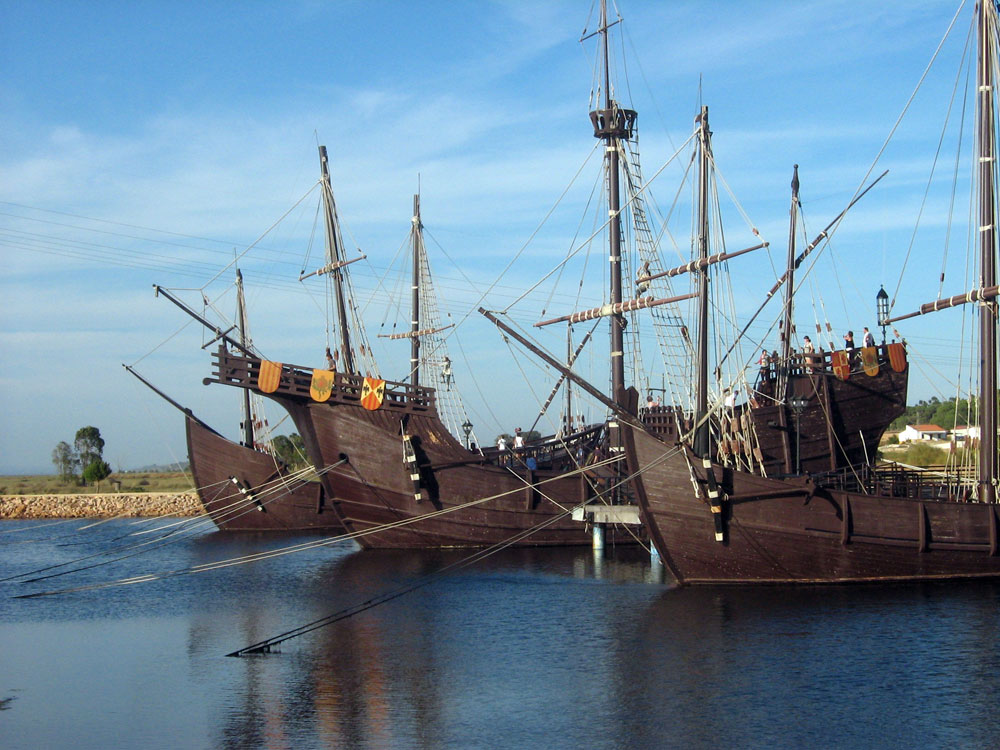
- Replicas of the Pinta, Niña, and Santa María at the Wharf.
- Established: 15 March 1994
- Location: Palos de la Frontera, Spain
- Type: Public
- Visitors: 200,000 (2008)
- Website: Official page on the site of the government of Huelva.

The Wharf of the Caravels (Spanish: Muelle de las Carabelas) is a museum in Palos de la Frontera, in the province of Huelva, autonomous community of Andalusia, Spain. Its most prominent exhibits are replicas of Christopher Columbus's ships for his first voyage to the Americas, the Niña, the Pinta, and the Santa María. These were built in 1992 for the Celebration of the Fifth Centenary of the Discovery of the Americas. The replica caravels were built between 1990 and 1992, put through shakedown voyages and then, in 1992, sailed the route of Columbus's voyage.

The museum is operated by the province of Huelva, and has an area of 11,500 square metres (124,000 sq ft).

== History ==
Throughout 1992 there were many celebrations of the fifth centenary of the Discovery of the Americas. Among these, in Spain, was the launching of replicas of the ships in which Columbus and a crew that included the Pinzón Brothers of Palos de la Frontera, the Niño Brothers of Moguer, and other mariners from the region made the voyage that is generally accounted as the discovery of the Americas by Europeans. These three boats formed part of the Seville Expo '92, and were part of numerous expositions throughout Europe and the Americas.

After they had been used in all manner of activities—including being used in filming 1492: Conquest of Paradise—the Andalusian Autonomous Government acquired the replicas as part of the project Andalucía 92. The key to this project was the construction of the Wharf of the Caravels near La Rábida Monastery in Palos de la Frontera, one of the key Lugares colombinos, sites associated with the preparation and launching of Columbus's first voyage. The resulting museum, inaugurated in 1994, is managed by the Diputación de Huelva, the government of Huelva province.

Since then, the Wharf of the Caravels has been open to the public, with the number of visitors increasing each year. In 2007, nearly 200,000 people visited, roughly 550 people a day. It is the third most visited tourist site in Andalusia. August is the busiest month in terms of visitors.

== Exhibits ==
=== Interpretive Center ===
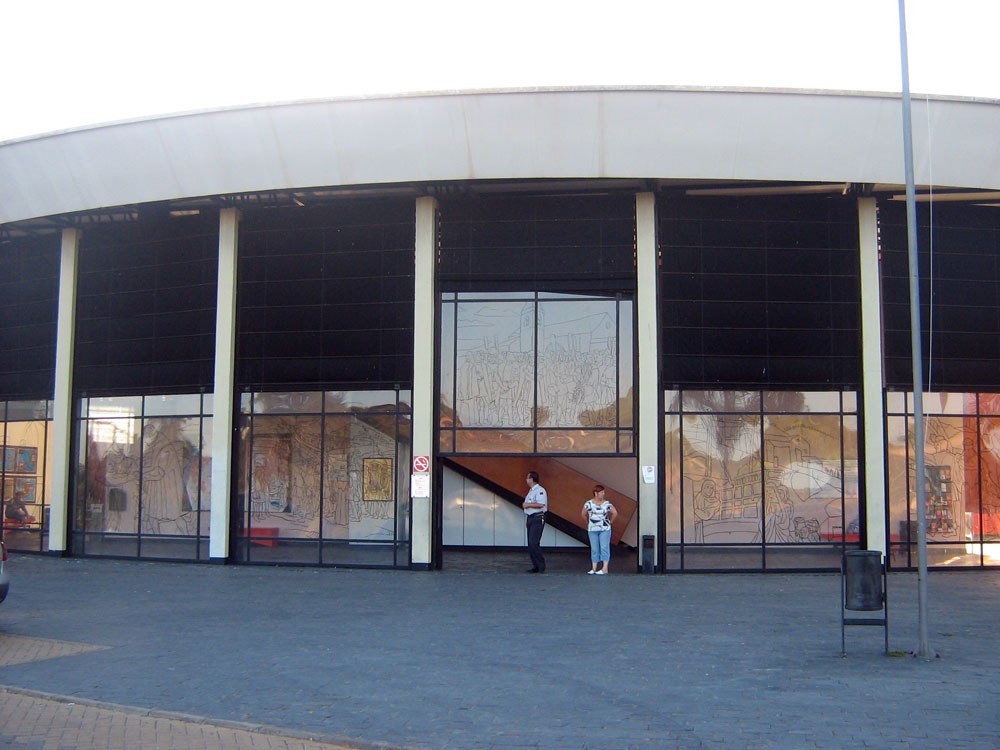
Entrance to the Interpretive Center.

The interpretive center contains an exhibit about 15th century society and exhibits related to Columbus's voyage of discovery including replicas of maps, arms, and treaties such as the Tratado de Tordesillas and the Treaty of Alcáçovas. The upper part of the building holds an exhibit of Pre-Columbian art. One of the featured exhibits is an Audio-visual production about half an hour in length, told from the point of view of the sailors who made the voyage.

=== Replicas of the ships ===
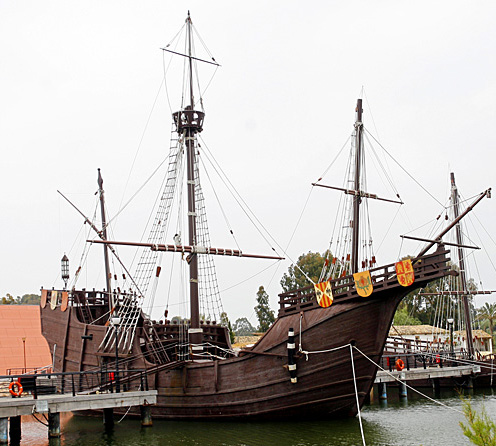
Replica of the Santa María.

The main item of interest at the museum is the trio of replica ships: the Pinta, Niña, and Santa María. The replicas were fashioned in the fishing port of Isla Cristina in western Huelva province as part of the celebrations of the fifth centenary of the Discovery of the Americas, and were the principle motive to create the Wharf of the Caravels. They are now moored at a semicircular dock. Visitors can board and tour each ship for a firsthand view of their holds and cabins. Although the historical reproductions were rigorous in terms of the general lines of the ships, to facilitate visitor access the Pinta has one small, deliberate deviation from what was indicated in the sources: a staircase to the ship's hold. The hold of the Niña cannot be visited, because its design, more faithful to history, would not allow a means to reach the hold that would be safe enough to open to the general public. The larger Santa María features Columbus's cabin, with a man impersonating a scribe, as well as access to the bowels of the ship.

=== Medieval neighborhood ===
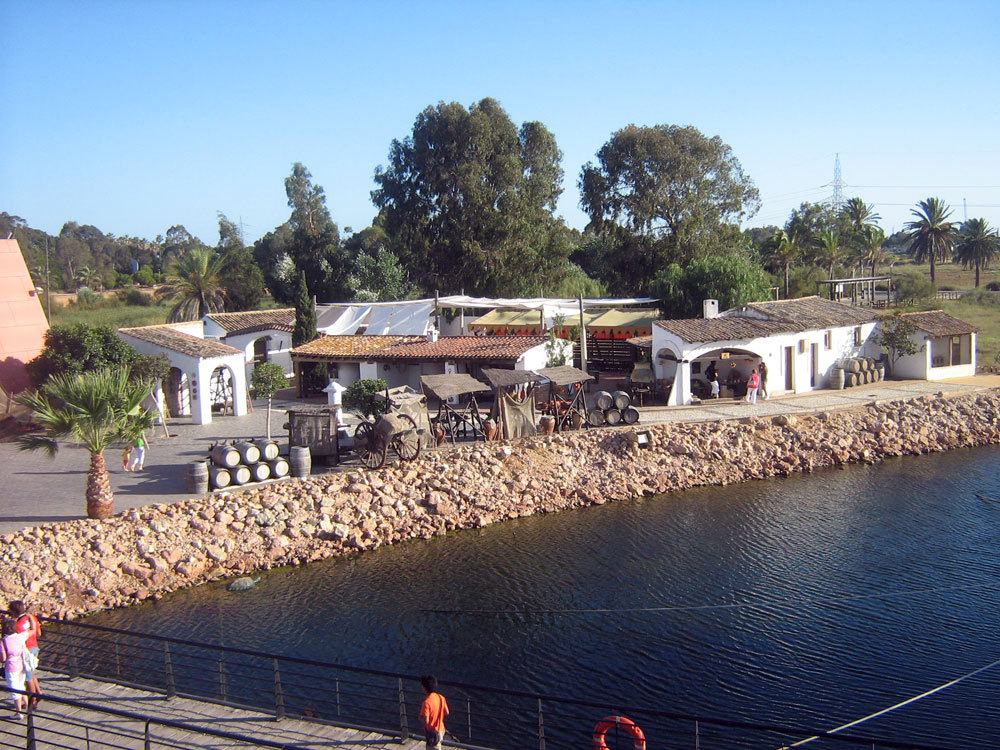
The medieval neighborhood, seen from one of the ships.

Situated near the dock is the Barrio Medieval, a reproduction of a medieval port neighborhood, reconstructing the environment in which common people lived around the time of the voyage of discovery, by means of such elements of daily life as a market, a pottery factory, and numerous carts, and a recreated tavern where museum-goers can buy food and drink. This area is a loose recreation of the medieval port of Palos de la Frontera (some 4 kilometres (2.5 mi) away).

Many objects in the market—ceramics, ironwork, objects made from espartofiber—are there to give the outlines of what would have been carried in the holds of ships.

=== Isla del Encuentro ===
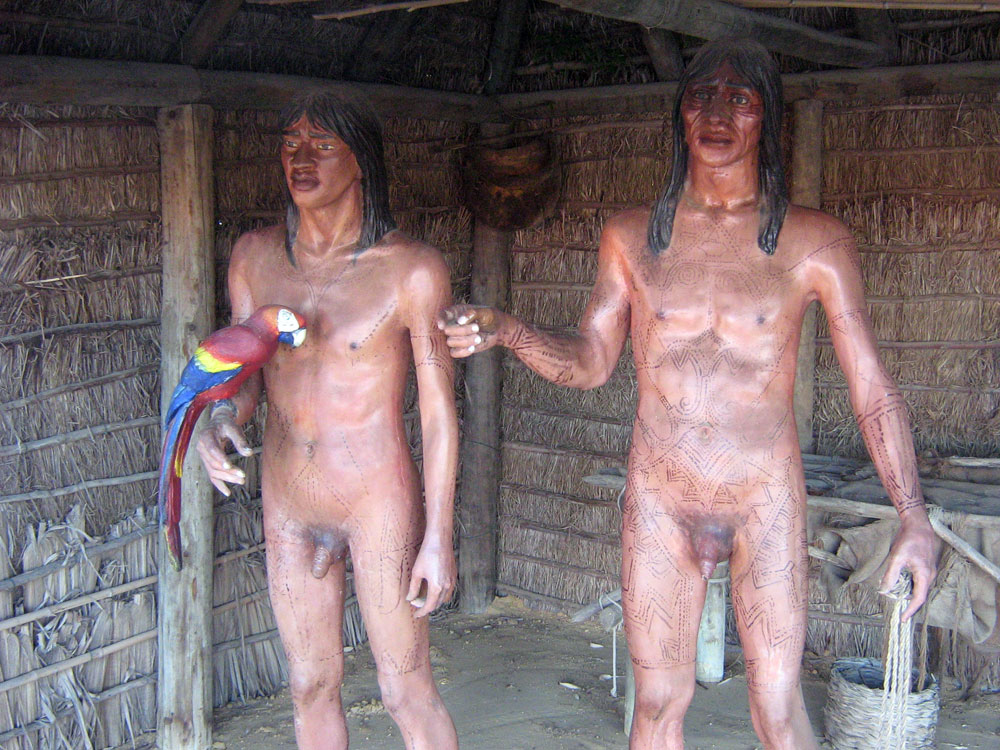
Statues of Amerindians.

The Isla del Encuentro ("Island of the Encounter") attempts to recreate the world the crew of Columbus's first voyage encountered on their arrival at the island of Guanahani, where they first made landfall in the Americas. An effort has been made to represent the indigenous culture. On the one side is a cottage with wood framing and reed walls; on the other, the people living on the island are represented by statues, representing people going about such ordinary activities as fishing or cooking; various objects of daily life are also on display, as are replicas of fauna typical of the Caribbean, including tortoises, parrots and various species of fish.

== The museum as film set and event location ==
The Wharf of the Caravels, and especially the three replica ships, has been used for its ambience or details in several films related to Columbus's voyage. Vicente Aranda has used the museum as a set in two if his films, Mad Love and Tirant lo Blanc. In 2003, the Spanish folk metal band Mägo de Oz used the museum for the photo session of their album Gaia, in which they appear dressed as pirates.

Also, various other events have been held at the museum, especially commemorations related to the voyage of discovery. Because the museum is open year-round, events can be held there on August 3 (the day of Columbus's departure), March 15 (the day of Columbus's return) and October 12 (landfall in the Americas), among others. The museum is also used as a location for other events that have little to do with the voyage of discovery.
