= Niña (ship) =

One of the ships in Columbus' voyage to the West Indies

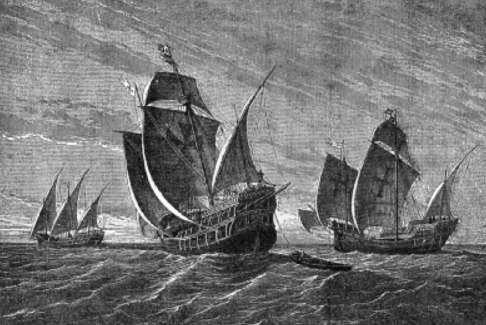
- A depiction of Niña as a caravel on the left

History

Spain
- Name: Santa Clara
- Namesake: Saint Clare
- Owner: Juan Niño
- Launched: Before 1492
- Nickname(s): Niña
- Fate: Last log 1501
- Notes: Nickname is Spanish meaning "little girl" – captained by Balboa

General characteristics
- Class & type: Caravel
- Tons burthen: 50–60 tons
- Length: 15.24 m (50.0 ft) on deck
- Beam: 4.85 m (15.9 ft)
- Draught: 2.07 m (6.8 ft)
- Complement: 24

La Niña (Spanish for The Girl) was one of the three Spanish ships used by Italian explorer Christopher Columbus in his first voyage to the West Indies in 1492. As was tradition for Spanish ships of the day, she bore a female saint's name, Santa Clara. However, she was commonly referred to by her nickname, La Niña ('The Little Girl'), which was probably a pun on the name of her owner, Juan Niño of Moguer ('Niño', his surname, meaning 'Little Boy'). She was a standard caravel-type vessel.

The other ships of the Columbus expedition were the caravel-type Pinta and the carrack-type Santa María. Niña was by far Columbus's favorite. She was originally lateen sail rigged caravela latina, but she was re-rigged as a caravela redonda at Las Palmas, in the Canary Islands, with square sails for better ocean performance. There is no authentic documentation on the specifics of Niña's design, although Michele de Cuneo, who accompanied Columbus on his second voyage, mentioned that Niña was "about 60 toneladas" (60 tons), which may indicate a medium-sized caravel of around 50 feet (15 m) in length on deck. Often said to have had three masts, there is some evidence she may have had four masts.

Niña, like Pinta and Santa María, was a smaller trade ship built to sail the Mediterranean sea, not the open ocean. It was greatly surpassed in size by ships like Peter von Danzig of the Hanseatic League, built in 1462, 51 m (167 ft) in length, and the English carrack Grace Dieu, built during the period 1420–1439, weighing between 1,400 and 2,750 tons, and 66.4 m (218 ft) long, in both weight and length.

== History ==
On Columbus's first expedition, Niña carried 26 men, commanded by Vicente Yáñez Pinzón. They left Palos de la Frontera on 3 August 1492, stopping at the Canary Islands on 12 August 1492, and continued westward. Landfall was made in the Bahamas at dawn on 12 October 1492.

On 14 February 1493, in the east of the Azores, a storm threatened to capsize Niña, and at Columbus's instigation, he and the crew took a series of vows to perform certain acts including religious pilgrimages upon their return to Spain. Niña reached Lisbon, Portugal, on 4 March 1493, and arrived in Palos de la Frontera on 15 March 1493. On the first voyage to America, the crew of Niña slept on the deck but adopted the use of hammocks after seeing Native Americans utilizing them.

On September 25, 1493, the caravel La Niña was part of the flotilla of Columbus' second voyage. Already in the new lands, she left as captain of an exploration trip in which the southern coast of Cuba and Jamaica were discovered. On June 30, 1494, during the return of this trip, La Niña hit bottom and suffered damage.

In the summer of 1495 at the port of Isabela, in Hispaniola, a cyclone damaged the Niña, and sank all the other moored ships. The caravel Santa Cruz was then built following the model of La Niña to replace the sunken ships. The Santa Cruz, also known as La India, was the first ship built in America by the Spanish. On June 11, 1496, the vessel returned to Spain with Columbus on board, as flagship.

Niña was then chartered for an unauthorized voyage to Rome. She was captured by a pirate corsair when leaving the port of Cagliari and brought to Cape Pula, Sardinia. The Captain, Alonso Medel, escaped with a few men. He stole a boat, rowed back to Niña, and made sail, returning to Cádiz.

In 1498, she returned to Hispaniola as advance guard of Columbus's Third Voyage. She was lying in wait at Santo Domingo in 1500. In 1501, she made a trading voyage to the Pearl Coast on the island of Cubagua, Venezuela, and no further log of her is found in historic archives.

Niña logged at least 25,000 nautical miles (46,000 km) under Columbus' command.

== Replicas ==
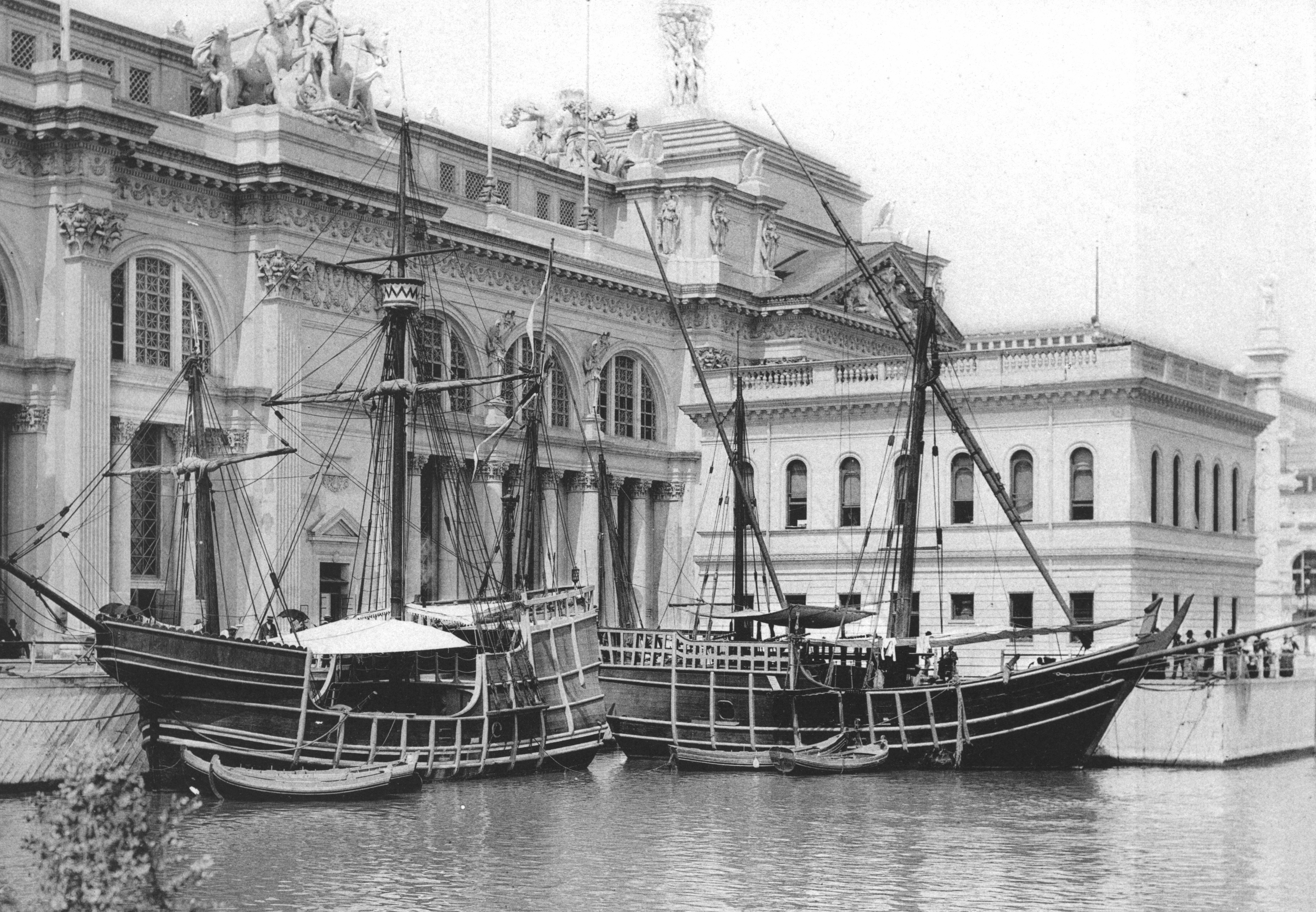
Niña and Pinta replicas at the 1893 Columbian Exposition

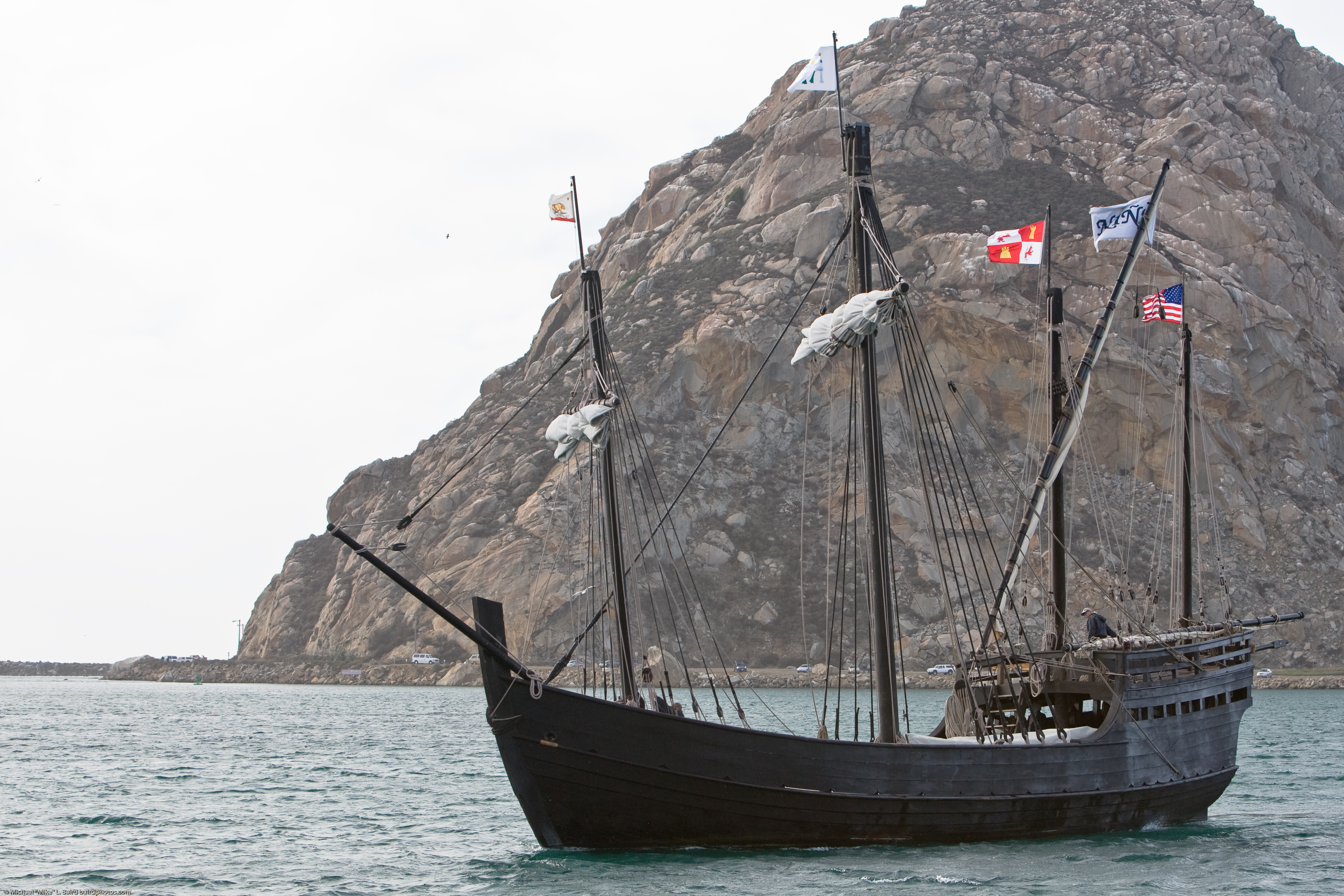
The replica of the Columbus Foundation

A replica of Niña was built by the Spanish government for the Columbian Naval Review of 1893. Along with replicas of Santa María and Pinta she participated in the review.

A replica of Niña (based upon theory; there are no known contemporary likenesses of any of the three ships) now sails around the world.

The 4-masted replica Niña was built 1988-1991 by engineer and naval researcher John Patrick Sarsfield, British naval historian Jonathan Morton Nance, and a group of master shipbuilders in Bahia, Brazil who were still using design and construction techniques dating back to the 15th century. They built it from heavy, teredo-resistant Brazilian hardwoods using only adzes, axes, hand saws, and chisels. The sails were designed by Nance using square main sails and two aft lateen sails as were used by ships of this size at the end of the 15th century. The crew of Niña say that it can make about 5–7 knots (9.3–13.0 km/h; 5.8–8.1 mph), which is quicker than older designs of the era. The replica weighs 75 tons.

In 1991, the replica sailed to Costa Rica to take part in the filming of 1492: Conquest of Paradise, and Niña has visited hundreds of North America ports to give the public a chance to see and tour the ship. The vessel continues to visit ports across the Eastern to mid-United States along with its sister replica ship, Pinta. On 16 September 2020 the ship went adrift after her dock broke up in Hurricane Sally at Pensacola, Florida. Her anchor line later snapped causing her to go ashore in Pensacola Bay near the Maritime Park, Pensacola. The replicas of Niña and Pinta were built in Valença, Brazil using the same methods as the 15th century Portuguese.

Other replicas are located in Andalusia, Spain (at El Puerto de Santa María and at the Wharf of the Caravels in Palos de la Frontera). A replica had been harbored in Corpus Christi, Texas in the United States, but it sank on April 23, 2017—from Hurricane Harvey.

The historic San Francisco restaurant Bernstein's Fish Grotto was designed to look like Niña.

== See also ==
- Columbian Exchange
- The Pinzón Brothers
- Voyages of Christopher Columbus
- Wharf of the Caravels
