= Virgin of Miracles =

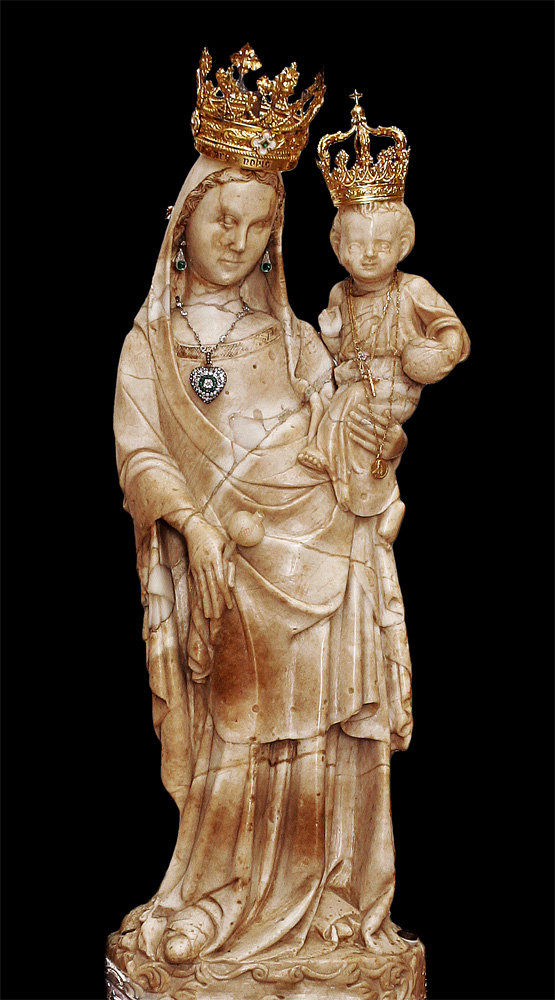
- Our Lady of Miracles; Saint Mary of La Rábida
- Venerated in: Catholic Church
- Major shrine: La Rabida Monastery
- Feast: August 15
- Attributes: Gothic; 13th century Anonymous
- Patronage: Palos de la Frontera

The Virgin of Miracles or Saint Mary of La Rábida (Spanish: Virgen de los Milagros or Santa María de la Rábida) is a religious Roman Catholic image venerated at the La Rabida Monastery in the city of Palos de la Frontera (Huelva, Spain).

The image is in Gothic style, from approximately the 13th century, carved in alabaster. It was an exceptional witness to the historic events of the Discovery of the Americas. Before it, prayed men like Columbus, The Pinzon Brothers, and the men who participated in the first expeditions of Columbus and in subsequent ones that departed to the Americas from this zone. Likewise, in their visits to the Franciscan monastery, many prostrated themselves, among others, Hernán Cortés, Gonzalo de Sandoval (who died in the monastery and was buried in it) and Francisco Pizarro.

Although it was dated towards the late 13th century or the early 14th century, included in the popular tradition and the legends is an ancient codex of 1714 from Fray Felipe de Santiago; it has been given an apostolic origin and some notable incarnations, like her apparition in the sea after the completion of the Umayyad conquest of Hispania among the nets of some fishermen from Huelva.

The image is a patron of both the monastery and the city of Palos de la Frontera, in which several diverse religious and civil acts are celebrated in the month of August in its honor culminating with the typical Andalusian romeria celebrated in the environment of La Rábida in the last weekend of that month.

Because of the various vicissitudes suffered by the image it has been repaired and restored on various occasions, however the carving largely conserves the original work.

On June 14, 1993, it was crowned by the Pope John Paul II, who named it «Mother of Spain and the Americas (Spanish: Madre de España y América)». The Godparents of honor for the coronation were the kings of Spain, who delegated to their daughter, Infanta Cristina. In the acts of this celebration she was also named, in part through the town hall. «Perpetual Honorary Mayor of Palos de la Frontera (Spanish: Alcaldesa Honoraria Perpetua de Palos de la Frontera)».

== The image and La Rábida ==
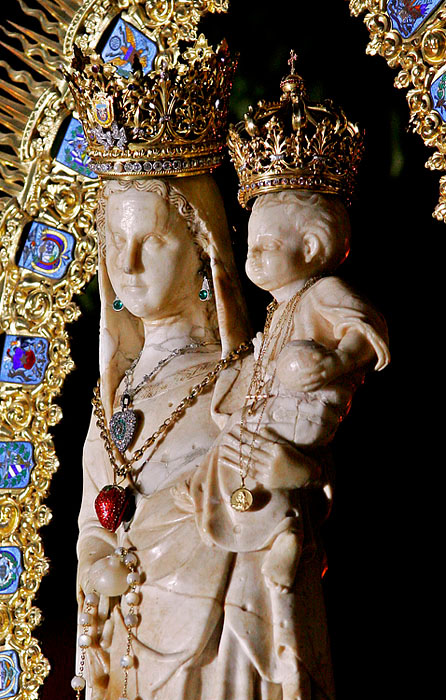
The current Image.

=== Description ===
The Image is a sculpture representative of the Virgin Mary built in alabaster, it stands 54 centimeters tall. The body of the sculpture is one piece, although with some minor attachments in the posterior due to some imperfections suffered during its history; it rests atop a 5 centimeter pedestal with elongated lines. Its face is also elongated with the hair combed naturally, and the hands a bit exaggerated with respect to the body. The dress is carved to resemble a tunic with a modest neckline which descends in parallel folds, regular and well carved, until it reaches the pedestal, where a glimpse of the right foot covered with a typical shoe is visible. The head is covered with a cloak which falls over the body a bit rigidly, and over her left arm which holds the baby Jesus in an upright posture with his right arm placed in the typical position for blessing in the old Greek manner and his left arm holding what resembles a globe, like the virgin he is dressed in a clinging tunic. It has a unique form of shifting the hips to sustain the baby in its left arm, which is characteristic of the type of sculpture to which it belongs. In her right arm the Virgin carries a Pomegranate, placed there in a restoration done in 1937, after the damage suffered during the Spanish Civil War, and which replaced the Lilium she initially held.

As an exterior adornment the image ports an aureola with an oval structure, something rare among images of the Virgin. The decoration itself is composed of a frame containing the enameled coat of arms of the primary countries of the Americas, and in the top-center is the coat of arms of Spain, the set is accentuated with alternating smooth and wavy beveled rays. It was created by Manuel Seco de Velasco and designed by Evaristo Domínguez, a painter from Palos de la Frontera.

=== Dating and style ===
Following the Byzantine art period of the late 13th century or early 14th century, the iconography of the model corresponds to the Hodegetria style (depicting Mary holding the Child Jesus as the source of salvation) developed in the Gothic period.

The style is undoubtedly Gothic, specifically French-Gothic, different authors also point towards a possible inspiration from the school of Gothic Pyrenean-Aragonese-Navarro, and it could even belong to the Gothic Mannerism or to Gothic Normandy. Examples of this type of imagery and of similar style, can be found in the "Capilla de los Alabastros" in the Seville Cathedral or in Church of San Lorenzo of the same city. Also at Palos de la Frontera, in the Parish of San Jorge there is an Image of Santa Ana sculpted in the same material. The father Ángel Ortega points out in his work that the ancient image of the Virgin of la Hiniesta de Gloria (lost in a 1932 fire) of the parish of San Julián de Sevilla, could have been a contemporary or even have served as a model.

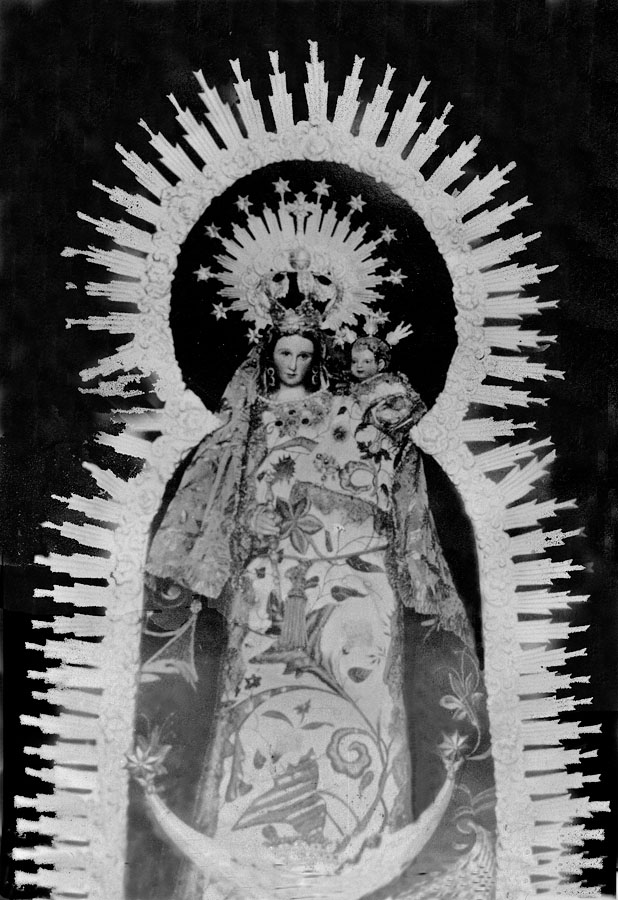
The image as it appeared dressed before 1936.

For centuries, the sculpture was polychrome, dressed in fine clothing, and adorned with precious stones according to all the various reports made on its restorations, wills, documentation, and engravings stored at the monastery and at the archives of the French order in the Provincia Beltica. The custom of dressing the image was very deeply rooted during the Middle Ages and among the most famous were the Our Lady of Guadalupe found in Cáceres, Spain, which received exquisite dresses at the hands of her adherents, a tradition still practiced and conserved in some of the local images of the area.

Finally after the restoration done in 1937, it was decided to eliminate the polychrome from the image and in 1938 it was returned to her monastery in the original form in which it was sculpted.

=== La Rabida Monastery ===
La Rabida Monastery is the home of the image where it has been permanently kept practically since its creation and where it received its unique name, "Santa María de la Rábida". It was erected in the 14th and 15th centuries. Among those buildings known for its artistic qualities are the Gothic-Mudéjar church, the decorated stays containing frescoes by Daniel Vasquez Diaz, the cloister, and the museum housing numerous objects commemorating the Discovery of the Americas.

Its irregular shape measures 2.00 m^{2} in area. The monastery, over its more than 500 years of history, has suffered several modifications, above all from the 1755 Lisbon earthquake.

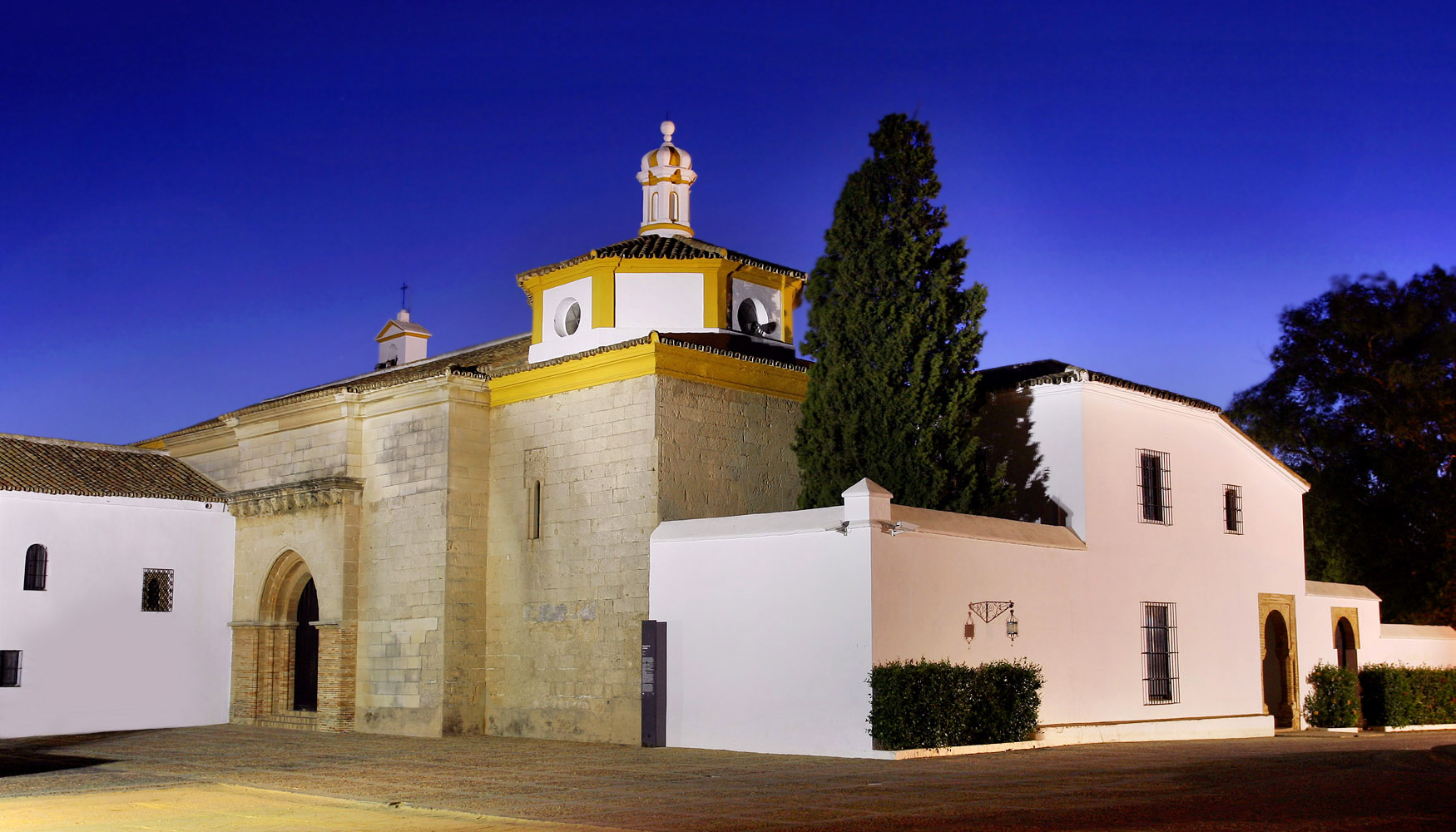
La Rabida Monastery.

It is one of the most prominent places from the events surrounding the discovery of the Americas; Columbus stayed there, it is the burial place of Martín Alonso Pinzón, it was visited by various Spanish conquistadors, and many of their religious practiced in the evangelization of the Americas. That is why it forms part of the distinguished historic and artistic itinerary known as los Lugares Colombinos.

The monastery was declared a National Monument in 1885 and further more was declared "First Historic Monument of the Hispanic Pueblos" (Spanish: Primer Monumento Histórico de los Pueblos Hispánicos).

On February 28, 1992, it was given the Golden Medal of Andalucía (Spanish: "Medalla de Oro de Andalucía") by the Andalusian Autonomous Government, and in the 9th Ibero-American Summit it was recognized as a meeting place for the Iberoamerican Community of Nations.

== History ==
The image has suffered various vicissitudes throughout the centuries; however, there is no evidence to indicate any impersonation, theft, or total disappearance in the various fires that have affected the monastery, as indicated by P. Ortega in 1925:

We assume that the existing and venerated (image) is the same, identical, (and is) the primary and only one to have existed, since all evidence seems to be in its favor, there is no motive to suspect that it was replaced.

In the oldest documents it is denominated with the name "Santa María de la Rábida". This is the appellation that has become universal and the original native name. Additionally, due to the many ancient documents that record the favors and supposed miracles attributed to it, it is known as "Our Lady of Miracles".

The original date on which it was carved, as well as the author and original monument upon which it was carried to the monastery remain unknown, the stylistic studies carried out have place it in the late 13th century or early 14th century. The Papal bull "Etsi cunctorum" of December 6, 1412, belonging to Antipope Benedict XIII already spoke of its appellation as a patron saint of the monastery, which places it before that date since the papal bull confirms the monastic life already existing in that particular hermitage. On another note, like many other images from the same area and time period, it is surrounded by various legends, fables, and traditions. However, all of them fundamentally lack historic or scientific backing. The majority are recognized in the 1714 codex of Fray Felipe de Santiago, where the traditions and legends of the area and time period are documented along with historical data.

=== Traditions and legends ===
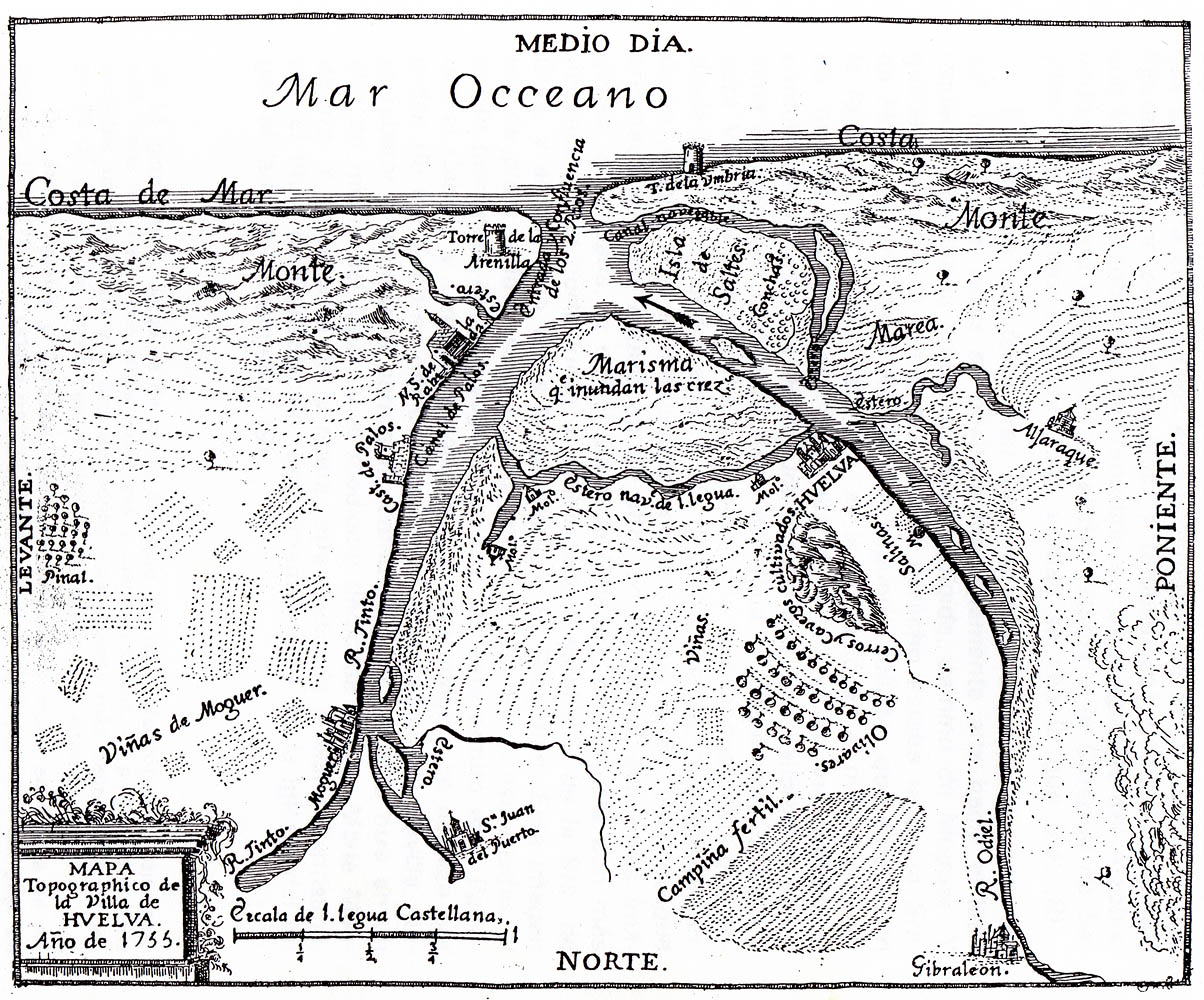
Topographic Map of the la Villa de Huelva and the Lugares colombinos 1755.

Among the most notable legends that circle the image are:

- The supposed apostolic origin of the image. Refers to the relocation of the image from the Holy Land to Palos, and that it was a work of Luke the Evangelist.
- The Virgin during the period of Arabian domination. Tells of how the image was deposited in the sea to avoid being desecrated by the Saracens until it was ready to be rescued at a better time.
- The joyous find at Sea. Recounts the apparition of the Virgin among the nets of some fishermen from Huelva and its subsequent crowning in the Franciscan monastery.

Both Fr. Angel Ortega and Fr. Sebastian Garcia among other authors repeat the tales, all of them largely inspired by the cited codex of 1714.

=== Apostolic origins ===
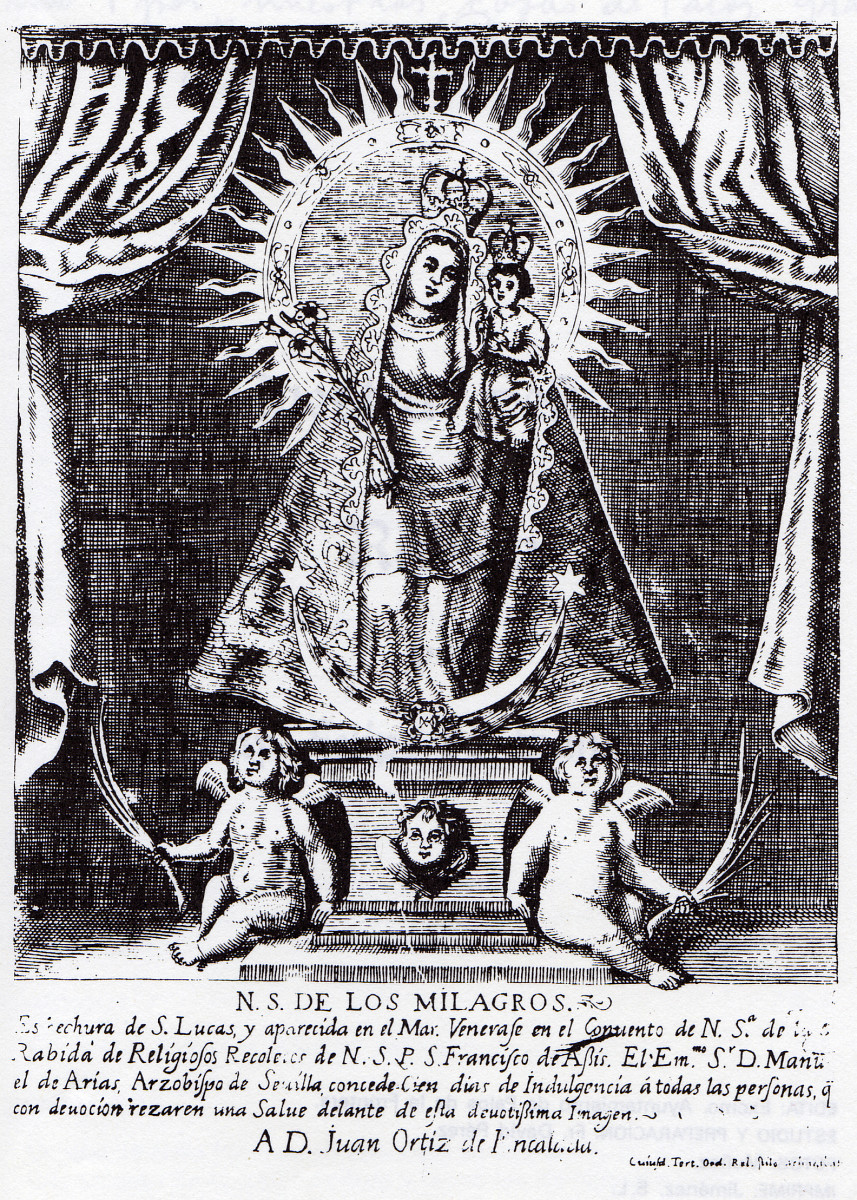
Circa the 18th century. The primitive lilium located in the right hand and the dress reflecting the time period can be observed.

According to legend, the image would have been sculpted in the beginnings of Christianity by St. Luke and brought to the port of Palos in the year 333 by a Libyan sailor, Constantino Daniel. The sculpture was a gift from the bishop of Jerusalem Saint Macarius as a pious present for having dedicated the parish of Palos to the martyr, Saint George, a patron saint very widespread in the East.

The codex recounts it:

The process of founding the parish of Palos began around 270, and ended by 331 ... It was dedicated to the glorious martyr Saint George by Constantino Daniel, who promised to plead with the Bishop [of Jerusalem] in order to obtain an image of the Virgin Mary for the parish of Palos... Constantino sailed to the holy city of Jerusalem and visited the Bishop and pleaded with him... The saint [i.e. Bishop Macarius] was pleased with Constantino's zeal, and granted the emperor’s petition. And Macarius told Constantino that he would intercede with God, to see if it would please Him to give him the image of the Virgin Mary that was at Mount Zion, which had been painted by Saint Luke. ... On the third day Macarius called Constantino to him, and told him that the Virgin Mary on Mount Zion was the one that he would need to bring back to Palos... Constantino had guarded the image since 331 with much diligence as well as a bell until he made another voyage to Palos ... The entire town came to the harbor to see the wonder that brought such joy... And Constantino ordered that it be recorded that he had been given the image of the saint as well as the bell by Saint Macarius... The image was placed in the principal altar, which before had been dedicated to Prosperina. and she was proclaimed patron saint along with the glorious martyr Saint George.

— SANTIAGO, Fr. Felipe de, "Codex", 1714.

=== Muslim period ===
The legends continue to attribute singular prodigious events and miracles to the image of the Virgin, including healing of sicknesses of all kinds, among the most noted was the cessation of a rabies epidemic when the sculpture had recently arrived. Also attributed is the defense of its homeland against pirate attacks. Under this halo of favors and healing, the image continued to be venerated until finally the peninsula fell under Muslim domination in 711. Under the imminent fear of having their patron saint desecrated or destroyed by the Saracens, two priests, Anselmo Gómez and Leandro Alberto, claimed that they had received a revelation commanding them to hide the image at sea until God saw a better moment to uncover it.

Once the Muslims were established, they took the cenobite, and in the altar where the Virgin would have been located, they placed the "leg bone of Muhammad". However, according to the legend, the bone was cast repeatably onto the floor, it was never permitted to stay in the spot previously occupied by the Virgin, an act which the followers of the prophet would have attributed to a supposed Christian enchantment. The Muslims decided to have with them a Christian, since every time one was retained the phenomena would cease. Finally, unable to support such events, it was negotiated to return the cenobite to Christianity.

...The great queen was in her house, with great worship and the Lord made great miracles... until in 714 Anselmo Gómez and Leandro Alberto (the cited priests), seeing the total loss which was occurring in Spain, cried to God, that they would act so the image of their Lady was not pillaged from the Saracens, and these two priests had a revelation to throw it into the sea ... with great pain and tears from all they cast into the Ocean not far from the coast, saying that when God was served it would be discovered.

— SANTIAGO, Fr. Felipe de, "Códice", 1714.

=== Reconquest: Apparition at sea ===
One of the last and most famous of the legends is regarding the apparition at sea, in the beach of "Morla", in the municipal territory of Palos, close to the monastery. According to this tradition, some fishermen from Huelva were casting their nets, and through fishing found the image which appeared in two pieces, first the Virgin with half of the Child, and later the rest of the Child. Upon finding her, the fishermen tried to take the image back to Huelva, which angered the townspeople of Palos. This led to disputes that were on the verge of ending in war between the two towns. Intervention was necessary by the overseeing abbot of the convent, whose opinion was respected by both sides, to finally resolve the issue; the Virgin was deposited in a boat near where she had appeared, leaving her alone without any crewmen, to see where the waves would take her. Eventually the boat arrived at the spot where the monastery was situated and they decided to dedicate an altar there to that image of that apparition.

== Bibliography ==
- AMADOR DE LOS RÍOS, Rodrigo (1909). "Catalogo de los Monumentos Históricos y Artísticos de la Provincia de Huelva" (Edición y estudio: Manuel Jesús Carrasco Terriza) (Original ed.). Diputación Provincial de Huelva. Servicio de Publicaciones. (Huelva, 1998). pp. págs. 263–268. ISBN 84-8163-137-X. ().
- SIMÓN PARDO, Jesús (2003). La devoción a la Virgen en España: Historias y leyendas. Ediciones Palabra. ISBN 84-8239-741-9. ().

== See also ==
- La Rabida Monastery
- Palos de la Frontera
