= Pinta (ship) =

One of the ships in Columbus' voyage to the West Indies

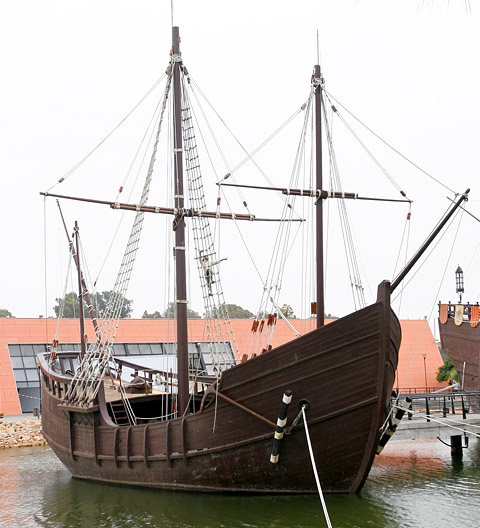
- Replica of La Pinta, in Palos de la Frontera

History

Castile
- Name: Unknown (see nickname)
- Owner: Cristóbal Quintero and Gómez Rascón
- Launched: 1441(?)
- Nickname(s): La Pinta

General characteristics
- Type: Caravel
- Tons burthen: 60–70 tons
- Length: 17 m (56 ft) on deck
- Beam: 5.36 m (17.6 ft)
- Draught: 2.31 m (7.6 ft)
- Propulsion: sail
- Complement: 26

A ship built in medieval Spain in c. 1441, known as La Pinta (Spanish for The Painted One, The Look, or The Spotted One) was the fastest of the three Spanish ships used by Christopher Columbus and his crew in his first transatlantic voyage in 1492. The New World was first sighted by Rodrigo de Triana aboard La Pinta on 12 October 1492. The owner of La Pinta was Cristóbal Quintero. The Quintero brothers were ship owners from Palos. The owner of the ship allowed Martín Alonso Pinzón to take over the ship so he could keep an eye on her.

La Pinta was a caravel-type vessel. By tradition, Spanish ships were named after saints and usually given nicknames. Thus, La Pinta, like La Niña, was not the ship's actual name; La Niña's actual name was the Santa Clara. The Santa María's original nickname was La Gallega. The actual original name of La Pinta is unknown. The origin of the ship is disputed but is believed to have been built in Spain in 1441. She was later rebuilt for use by Christopher Columbus.

== Detail ==
La Pinta was square rigged and smaller than Santa María. The ship displaced approximately 60 tons, with an estimated deck length of 17 meters (56 ft) and a width of 5.36 meters (17.6 ft). The crew size was 26 men under Captain Martín Alonso Pinzón.

The other ships of the Columbus expedition were La Niña (real name Santa Clara) and Santa María. There are no known contemporary likenesses of Columbus's ships.

Santa María (also known as the Gallega) was the largest, of a type known as a carrack (carraca in Spanish), or by the Portuguese term nau. La Niña and La Pinta were smaller. They were called caravels, a name then given to the smallest three-masted vessels. Columbus once used the word for a vessel of forty tons, but it generally applied in Portuguese or Spanish use to a vessel ranging from 120 to 140 Spanish "toneles". This word represents a capacity about one-tenth larger than that expressed by the modern English "ton".

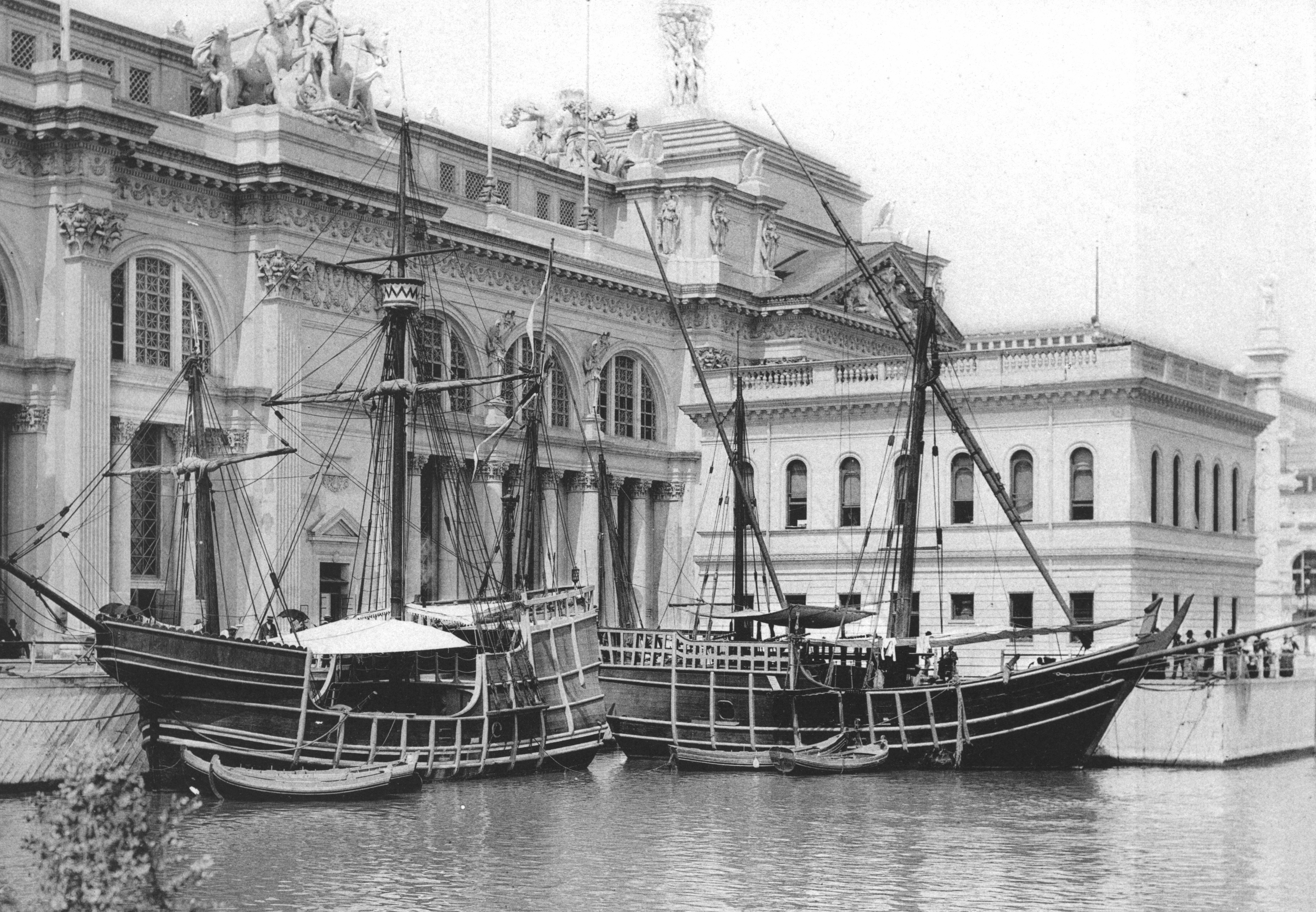
La Niña and La Pinta replicas at the 1893 Columbian Exposition

La Niña, La Pinta, and Santa María were not the largest ships in Europe at the time. They were small trade ships surpassed in size by ships like Great Michael, built in Scotland in 1511 with a length of 73.2 m (240 ft), and a crew of 300 sailors, 120 gunners, and up to 1,000 soldiers. Peter von Danzig of the Hanseatic League was built in 1462 and was 51 m (167 ft) long. Another large ship, the English carrack Grace Dieu, was built during the period 1420–1439, was 66.4 m (218 ft) long, and displaced between 1,400 tons and 2,750 tons. Ships built in Europe in the 15th century were designed to sail the Mediterranean Sea and the Atlantic Ocean coastlines. Columbus' smaller-sized ships were considered riskier on the open ocean than larger ships. This made it difficult to recruit crew members, and a small number were jailed prisoners given a light sentence if they would sail with Columbus.

Most of the commerce of the time was the coastal commerce of the Mediterranean, so it was better if ships did not draw much water. As it sailed, the fleet of Columbus consisted of Gallega (the Galician), which he changed to Santa María, La Pinta and La Niña. Of these the first was about 100 tons, the second about 70 tons. La Niña was smaller, not more than 50 tons. One writer says that they were all without full decks, that is, that such decks as they had did not extend from stem to stern. Other authorities, however, speak as if La Niña only was an open vessel, and the two larger were decked. Columbus himself took command of Santa María, Martin Alonso Pinzon of La Pinta, and his brothers, Francis Martin and Vicente Yanez, of La Niña. The whole company in all three ships likely numbered 90 men (Santa Maria 40, La Nina 24, La Pinta 26) although some historians cite 120 men.

== Replicas ==
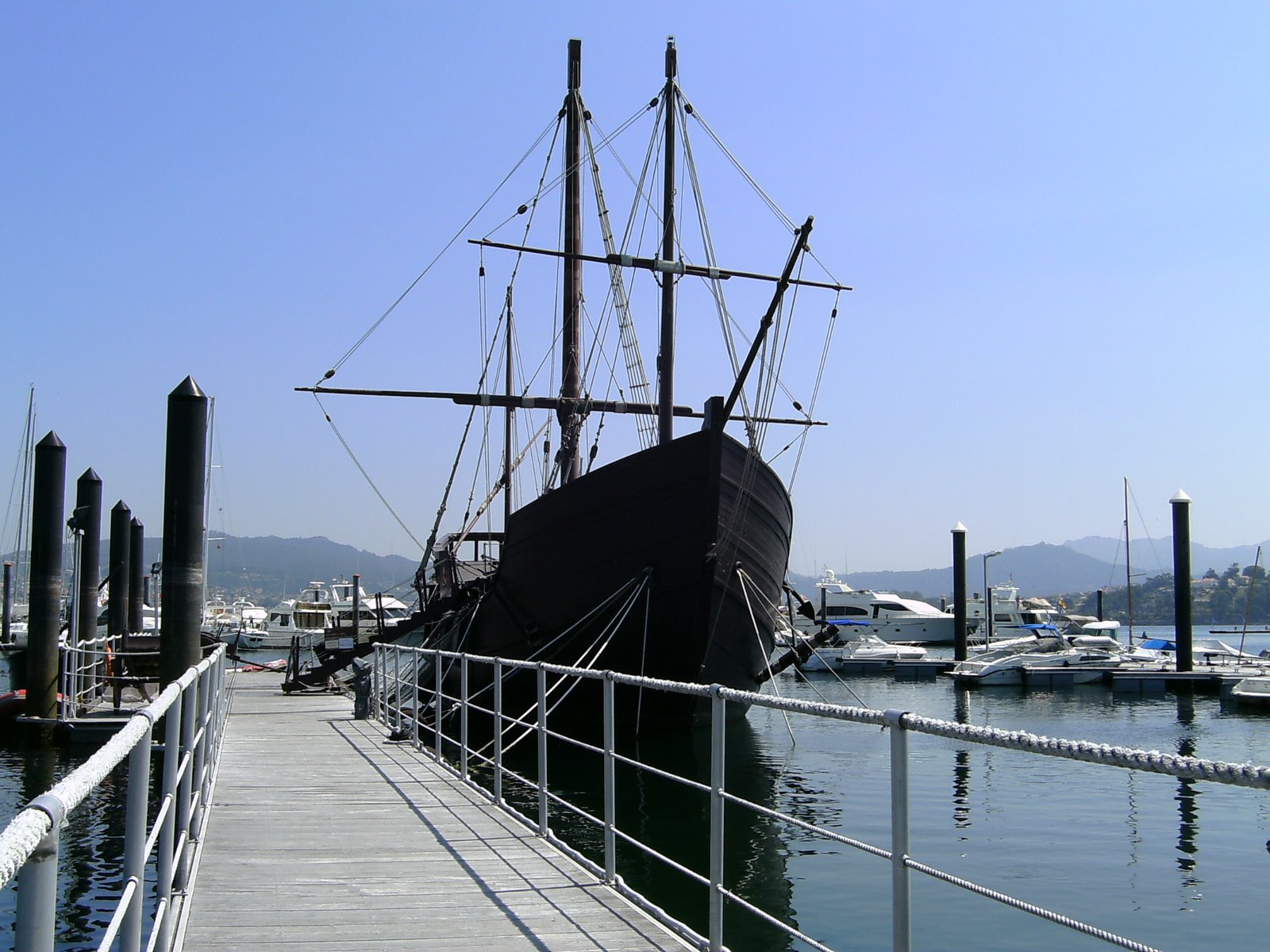
La Pinta museum at Baiona, Pontevedra, Galicia, Spain

A replica of La Pinta was built by the Spanish government for the Columbian Naval Review of 1893. Along with replicas of Santa María and La Niña, it participated in the review.

Replicas are on display in two locations in Spain:

- at the Wharf of the Caravels (Spanish: Muelle de las Carabelas) in Palos de la Frontera, Andalusia
- in Baiona, Pontevedra, Galicia

In 2008, a replica of La Pinta, although 15 feet (4.5 m) longer and 8 feet (2.4 m) wider than the original, was launched by the Christopher Columbus Foundation. This ship weighs about 100 tons and often sails alongside an authentic replica of La Niña, which was launched in 1991.

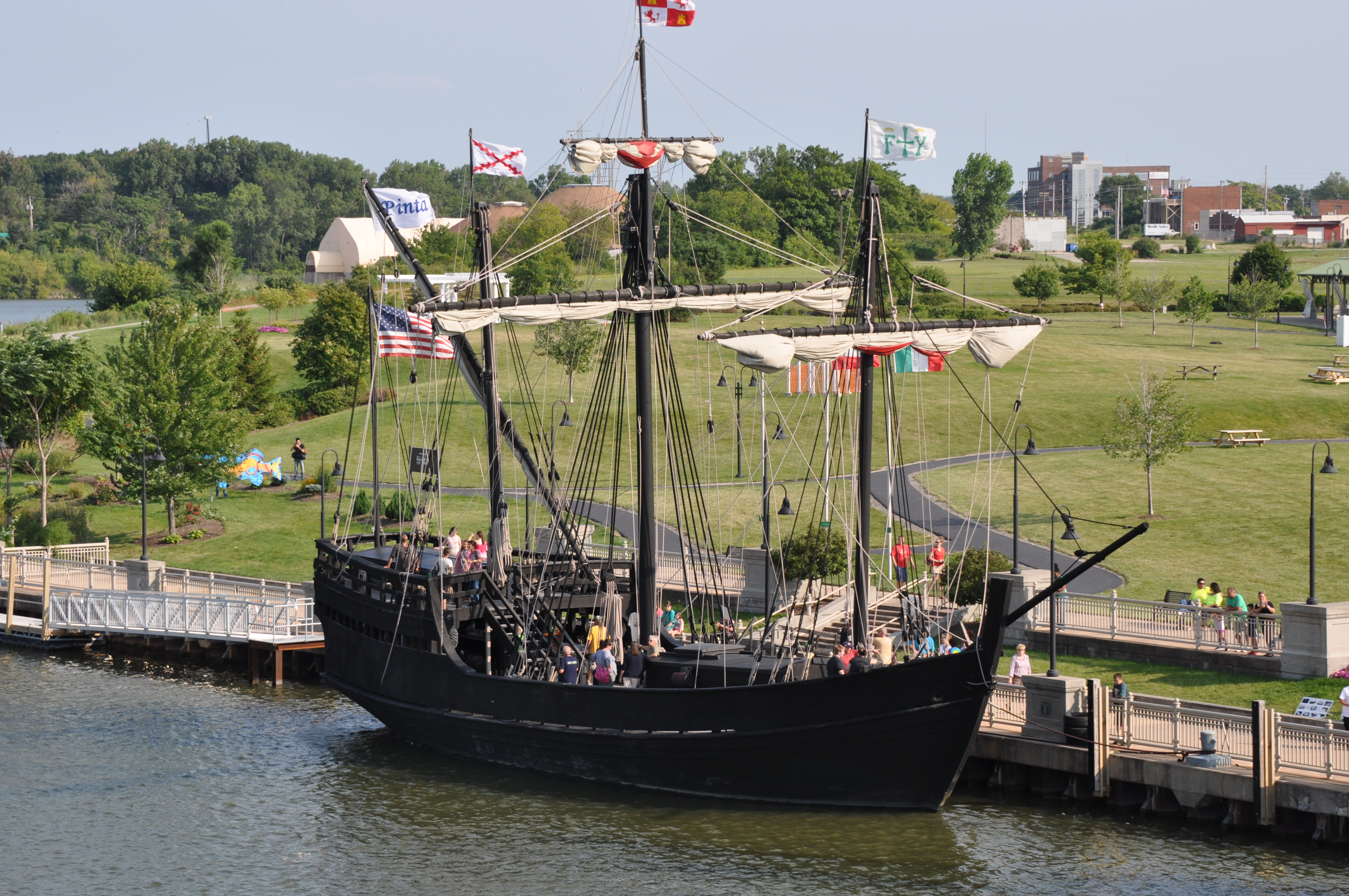
Replica of La Pinta commissioned by the Columbus Foundation

== Legacy ==
Pinta in the Galapagos Islands is named for the ship and Pinzón Island for its captain.
