= Santa María (ship) =

One of the ships in Columbus' voyage to the West Indies

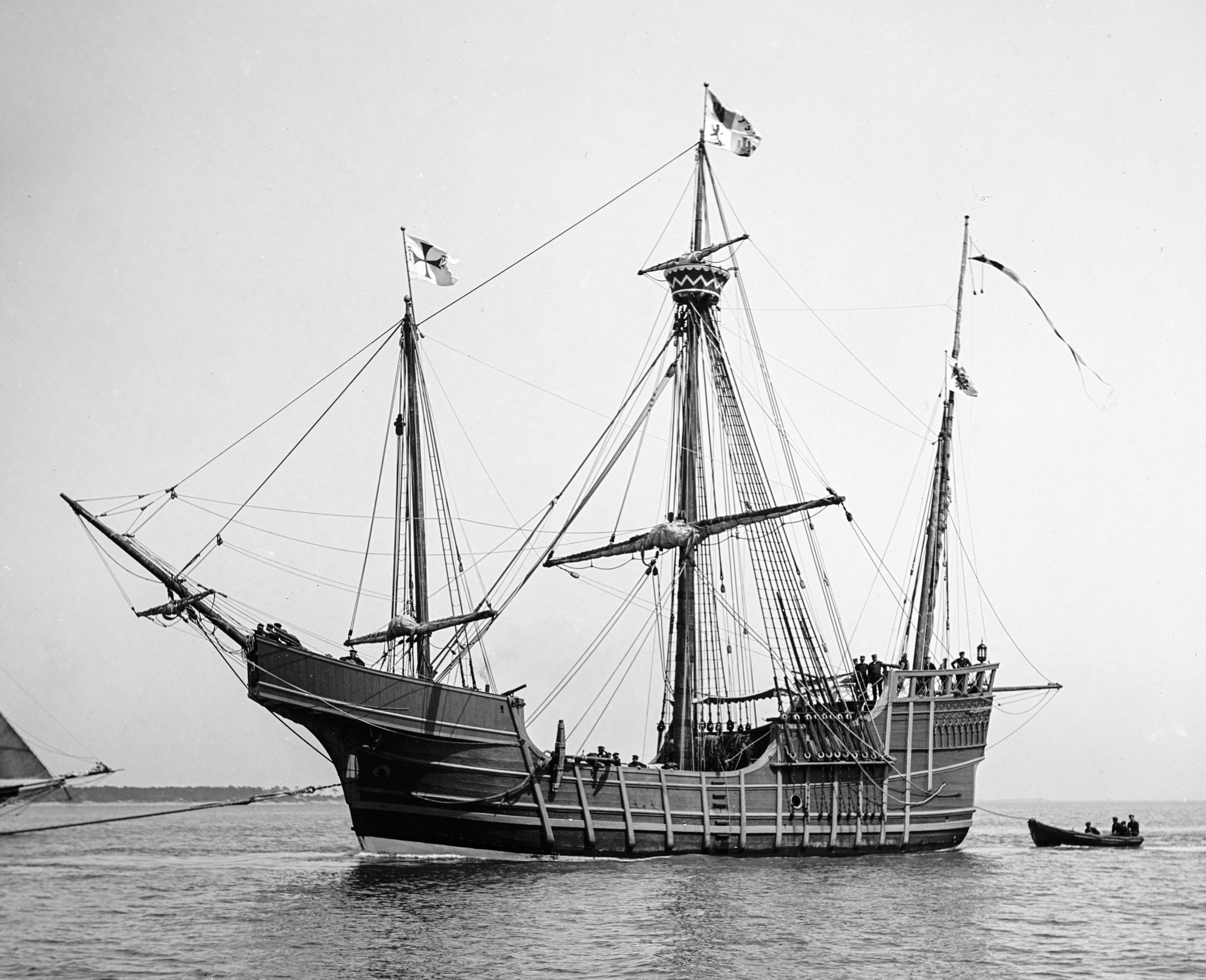
- 1892 replica

History

Castile
- Name: Santa María de la Inmaculada Concepción (originally La Gallega)
- Namesake: Immaculate Conception of the Blessed Virgin Mary
- Owner: Juan de la Cosa
- Launched: 1460
- Fate: Wrecked 24 December 1492; Sank 25 December 1492

General characteristics
- Type: Carrack
- Displacement: est. 150 metric tons of displacement
- Tons burthen: est. 108 tons BM
- Length: est. hull length 19 m (62 ft); est. keel length 12.6 m (41 ft)
- Beam: est. 5.5 m (18 ft)
- Draught: est. 3.2 m (10 ft)
- Propulsion: sail
- Complement: 40
- Armament: 4 × 90 mm bombards, 50 mm culebrinas
- Notes: Captained by Christopher Columbus

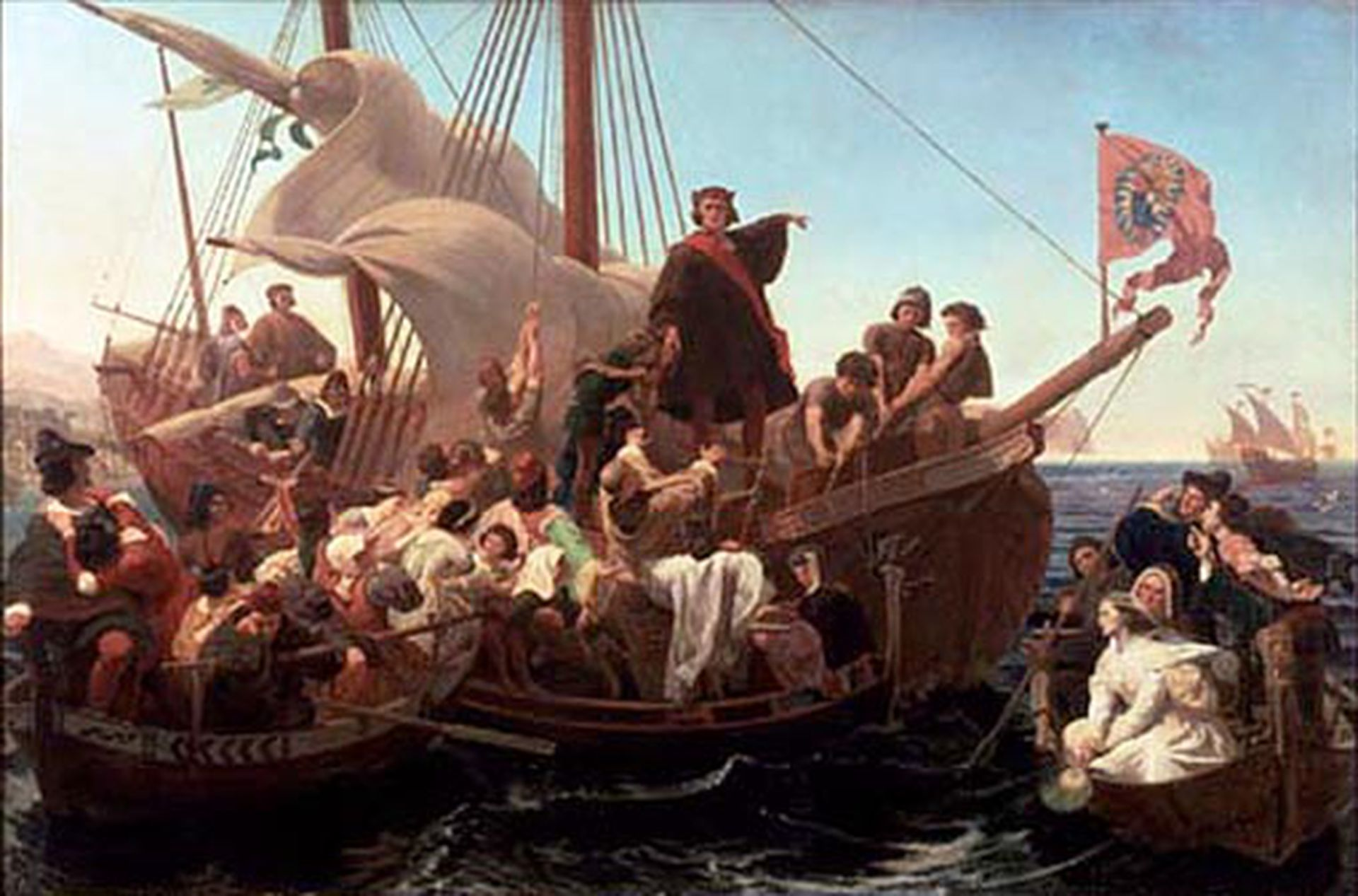
Christopher Columbus on Santa María in 1492, oil

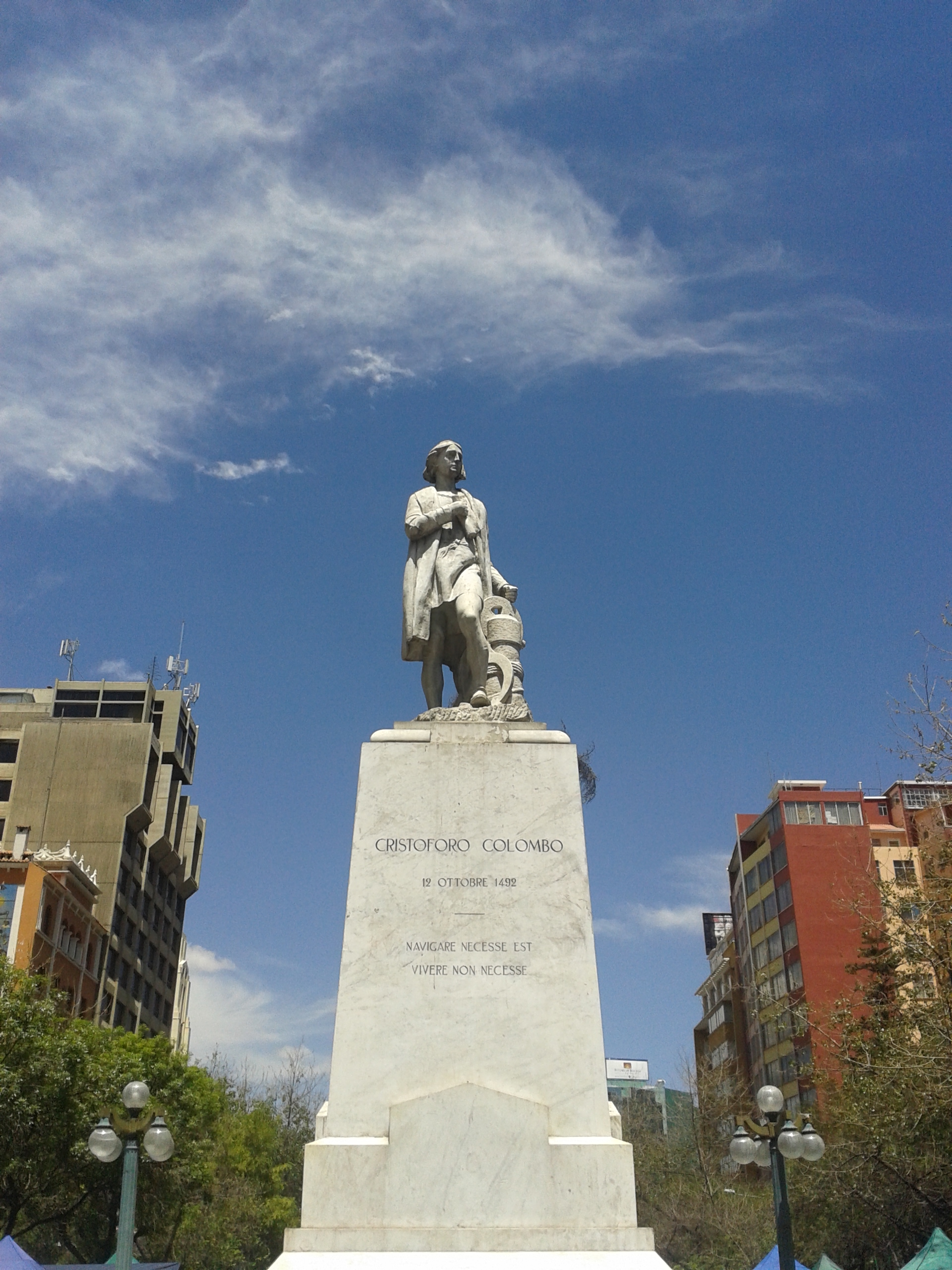
Colombo monument

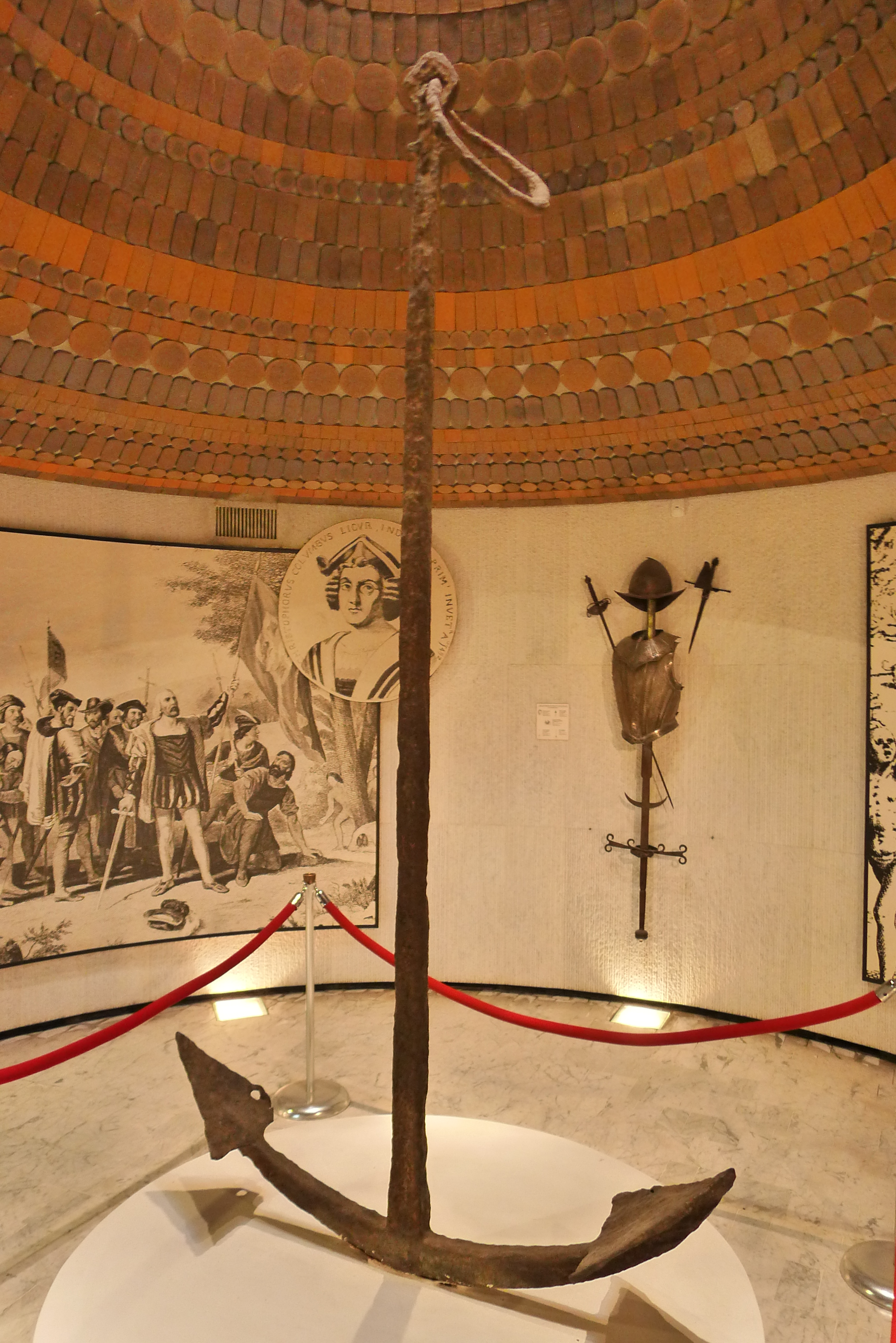
One of Santa María's alleged anchors on display at Musée du Panthéon National Haïtien

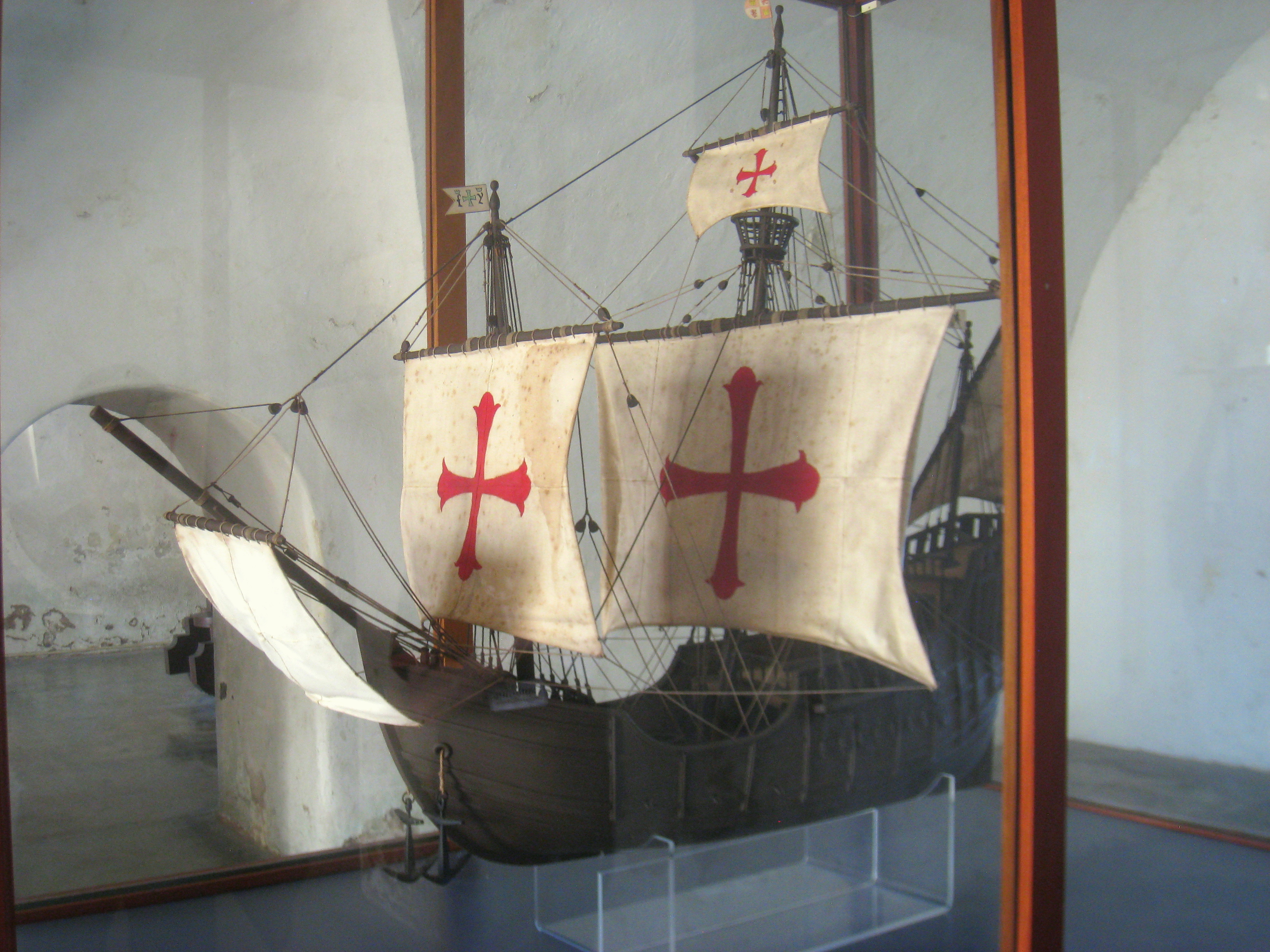
Ship model at Fort San Cristóbal, San Juan, Puerto Rico

La Santa María de la Inmaculada Concepción (Spanish: [la ˈsãn̪.t̪a maˈɾi.a ð̞e̞ la ĩm.ma.kuˈla.ð̞a kõn̟.θeβ̞ˈθjõn] lit. 'The Holy Mary of the Immaculate Conception'), or La Santa María (Spanish: [la ˈsãn̪.t̪a maˈɾi.a]), originally La Gallega (Spanish: [la ɡaˈʝe.ɣ̞a]), The Galician, was the largest of the three small ships sailed by Christopher Columbus in his first expedition across the Atlantic Ocean in 1492, with the backing of the Catholic Monarchs of Spain. Her master and owner was Juan de la Cosa.

In 1492, the ship ran aground on a sand bar near modern-day Cap-Haïtien of the island of Hispaniola. The ship's wood was stripped and then utilized in the construction of a wooden fort at Limonade. One of her anchors survives to the present day in a museum in Haiti. In the 19th and 20th century, several replicas were created with varying attributes and dimensions, as the size and details of the original ship are unknown.

== History ==
Built in Pontevedra, Galicia, Santa María was a small commercial nau or carrack, with a single 62-foot (18.9-metre)-long deck and three small masts. According to Juan Escalante de Mendoza in 1575, she was "very little larger than 100 toneladas" (about 100 tons) burthen and was considered the expedition's flagship.

The other ships of the Columbus expedition were the smaller caravel-type ships Santa Clara, nicknamed La Niña ("The Girl"), and La Pinta ("The Painted"). All three ships had previous owners and were not intended for exploration. Niña, Pinta and Santa María were modest-sized merchant vessels comparable in size to a modern cruising yacht. The exact measurements of the three ships have not survived, but reliable estimates of their burden capacity may be determined from contemporary anecdotes written by Columbus's crewmembers as well as from examination of wrecks of similar Spanish and Portuguese ships from the 15th and 16th centuries. These include the ballast piles and keel lengths of the Molasses Reef Wreck and Highborn Cay Wreck in the Bahamas, both of which involved caravel vessels 19 m (62 ft) in length overall, 12.6 m (41 ft) keel length and 5 to 5.7 m (16 to 19 ft) in width, and rated between 100 and 150 tons burden. Santa María, Columbus's largest ship, was of similar size, and Niña and Pinta were smaller, at only 50 to 75 tons burden and perhaps 15 to 18 metres (49 to 59 ft) on deck.

== Shipwreck ==
La Santa María was the slowest of Columbus's vessels but performed well in the Atlantic Ocean crossing. During the exploration of the discovered islands, La Santa María was sailing off the coast of Hispaniola. An analysis of the tides using the Julian calendar, which was used in Iberia in 1492, indicates that on the night of 24–25 December 1492, the moon was a waxing crescent five days past new (new moon 19 December, first quarter moon 26 December). It had set before midnight, leaving the coast dark during a period of neap tides, when the already small tidal range at Cap-Haïtien is at its lowest. On this day, the tidal variation was very low, with an estimated 43 cm between high and low tide, using a reconstructed tide chart for 24–25 December 1492.

Position fixes in the Diario place the grounding a few kilometers east of Cap-Haïtien, not on the reef immediately off the village. This is about 1.5 Portuguese leagues west of the excavated La Navidad site, which also matches the Diario's description of the distance to En Bas Saline.

An apprentice, typically a boy or young man, likely was at the helm rather than a cabin boy, as sometimes stated. It was common practice (though forbidden by Columbus on this voyage) for an apprentice to take the helm, but not for a cabin boy to do so.

A key factor in assessing the various responses to the grounding was whether La Santa María ran aground on a coral reef or a sandbar – a topic where there is disagreement among researchers and historians. On a hard reef, a ship that bumps into it at half a knot to a knot in gentle water is most likely touching, not lodged. There is no sand to settle into, so hauling her off is feasible — and urgent. On a sand bank, the situation reverses. There is no immediate danger to the hull in calm water. But the keel beds into the sand, sand fills in around the hull, and suction holds it — so pulling a laden ship out sideways or backward with a small anchor is extremely difficult, even with prompt action. The evidence from the Diario, includes that the grounding was so gentle that it could scarcely be felt, that no pounding against rocks was described, that the ship turned and lay broadside, that listing occurred, that the hull wasn't immediately broken apart, and Columbus returned "by the inside of the reef of the bank" — all is more consistent with a grounding on a sandbank inside the reef than on the reef itself.

After the grounding took place, the Diario records a disagreement between De la Cosa and Columbus. Columbus ordered him to use the stern anchor to kedge the ship and pull it off where it had lodged. However, the Diario records that De la Cosa instead took a small boat and rowed half a league to La Niña to seek assistance. Columbus, on the other hand, who wanted his order followed, recorded that he "cared only to flee" to the caravel.

Meanwhile, with the water ebbing and the ship lying broadside, Columbus ordered the mainmast cut and everything that could be removed taken out of her. Seams opened, allowing water to enter. One possible cause is that cutting down a mast on a grounded ship sends large and shifting loads through the mast step. This shifting load can wrench the step and spring the planking around it. Another possibility is that a wooden hull on a reef would be expected to hole or break up. However, the Diario records a hull whose seams opened in a delayed manner and did not cause the ship to break up. A third possibility is that being elevated out of the water during the ebbing tide caused the seams. However, with only 43 cm of tidal variation, it is unlikely that the ship was lifted far enough out of the water to cause its own weight to crush its hull. This leaves the removal of the main mast and seams in the planks opening as a likely, but not conclusive, cause of water entering La Santa María that ultimately caused her demise.

Realizing that the ship was beyond repair, Columbus ordered his men to strip the timbers from the ship. The timbers were later used to build a fort near the modern town of Limonade that Columbus named La Navidad (Christmas) because the wreck occurred on Christmas Day.

Santa María carried several anchors, possibly six. One of the anchors now rests in the Musée du Panthéon National Haïtien in Port-au-Prince, Haiti.

On 13 May 2014, underwater archaeological explorer Barry Clifford claimed that his team had found the wreck of Santa María. The following October, UNESCO's expert team published its final report, concluding that the wreck could not be that of Santa María. Fastenings used in the hull and possible copper sheathing dated the ship to the 17th or 18th century.

== Crew ==
Contrary to common belief, Columbus's crew was not primarily composed of criminals. Many were experienced seamen from the port of Palos in Andalusia and its surrounding countryside, as well as from the region of Galicia in northwest Spain. The Spanish rulers did offer amnesty to convicts who enlisted for the voyage, but only four convicts accepted the offer. One of the convicts had killed a man in a fight, and the other three were his friends who had helped him escape from jail.

Despite the romantic legend that the queen of Spain had offered her valuable necklace as collateral for a loan, the voyage was principally financed by a syndicate of seven noble Genovese bankers residing in Seville (the group was linked to Amerigo Vespucci and funds belonging to Lorenzo di Pier Francesco de Medici). Hence, all of the accounting and recording of the voyage was kept in Seville. This also applies to the second voyage, although the syndicate had disbanded by that point.

Although the first names of the crew of Santa María are known, some of their surnames are unknown, so their places of origin have traditionally been added to differentiate them from others sharing the same first name.

=== Crew list ===
- Cristoforo Colon (Christopher Columbus), captain-general
- Juan de la Cosa, owner and master
- Pedro Alonso Niño, pilot
- Diego de Arana, master-at-arms
- Pedro de Gutierrez, royal steward
- Rodrigo de Escobedo, secretary of the fleet
- Rodrigo Sanchez, comptroller
- Luis de Torres, interpreter
- Bartolome Garcia, boatswain
- Chachu, boatswain
- Cristobal Caro, goldsmith
- Juan Sanchez, physician
- Antonio de Cuéllar, carpenter
- Diego Perez, painter
- Lope, joiner
- Rodrigo de Triana
- Maestre Juan
- Rodrigo de Jerez
- Alonso Chocero
- Alonso Clavijo
- Andres de Yruenes
- Bartolome Biues
- Bartolome de Torres
- Diego Bermudez
- Domingo de Lequeitio
- Gonzalo Franco
- Jacomel Rico
- Juan (Horacio Crassocius from La Rabida Friary)
- Juan de Jerez
- Juan de la Placa
- Juan Martines de Acoque
- Juan de Medina
- Juan de Moguer
- Juan Ruiz de la Pena
- Marin de Urtubia
- Pedro Yzquierdo
- Pedro de Lepe
- Pedro de Salcedo, servant of Columbus and ship's boy
- Rodrigo de Gallego
- Pedro de Terreros, cabin boy
- Diego García

== Replicas ==
Replicas of the Santa María

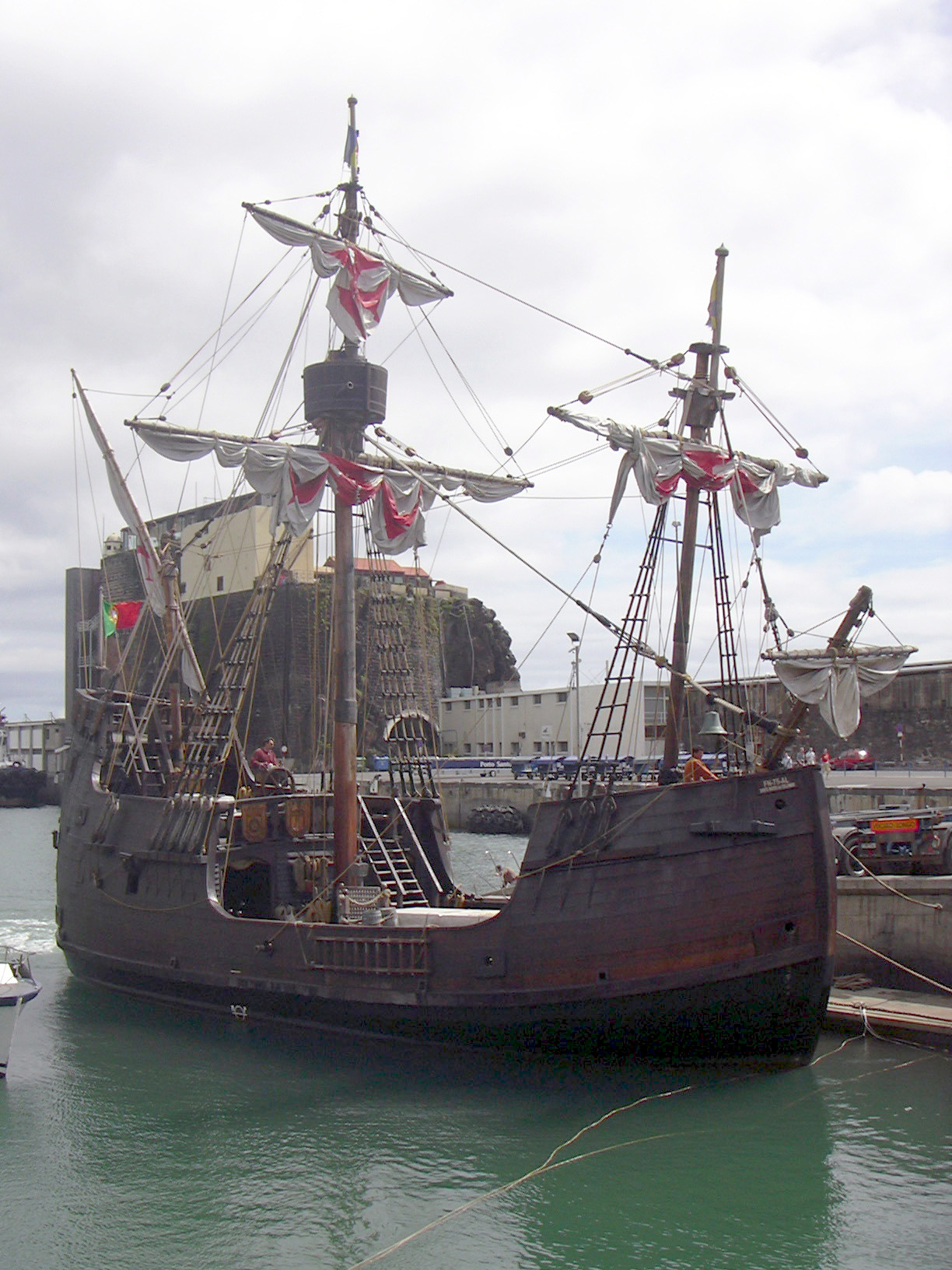
Santa Maria de Colombo, built in 1997–1998 on Madeira

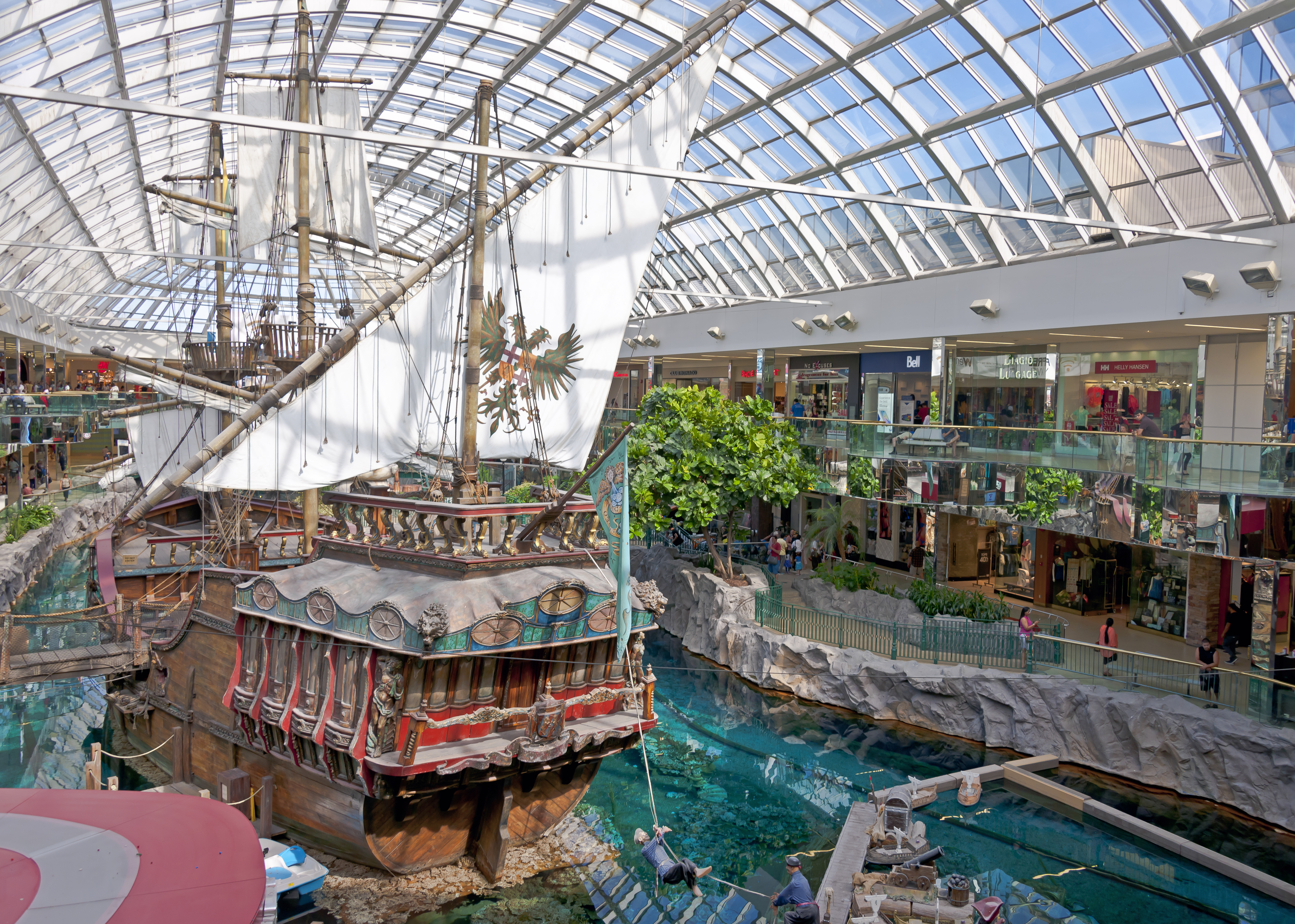
Replica in West Edmonton Mall, Canada

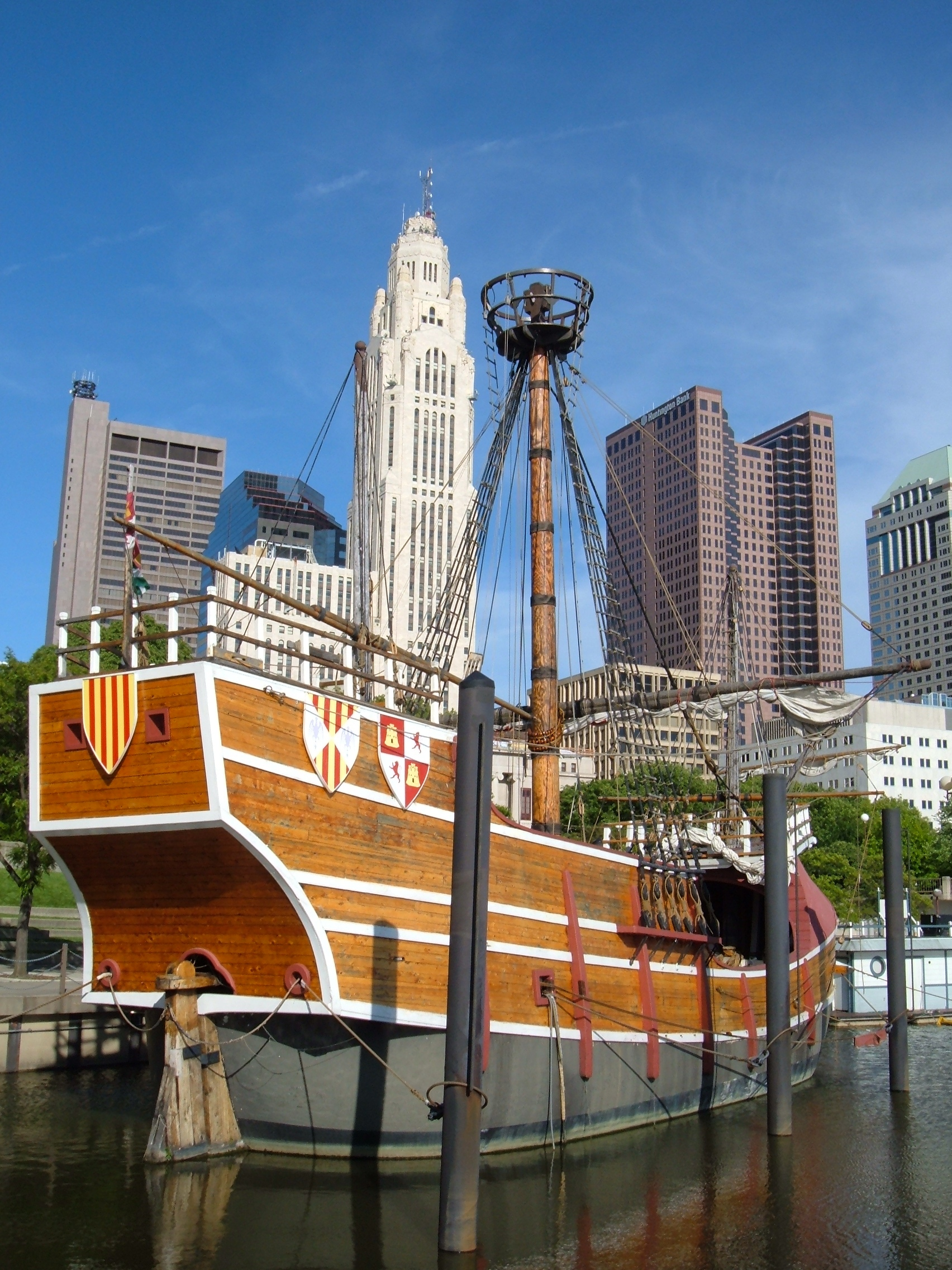
Replica in Columbus, Ohio, US

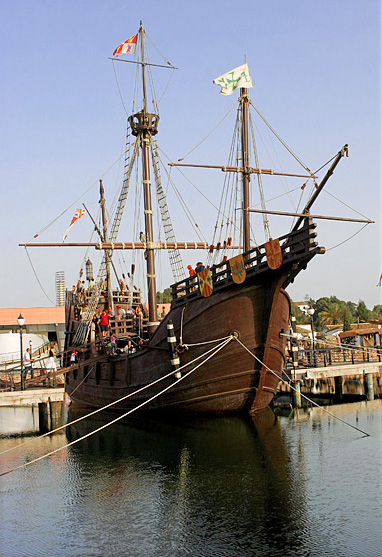
Replica in Wharf of the Caravels, Palos de la Frontera, Spain

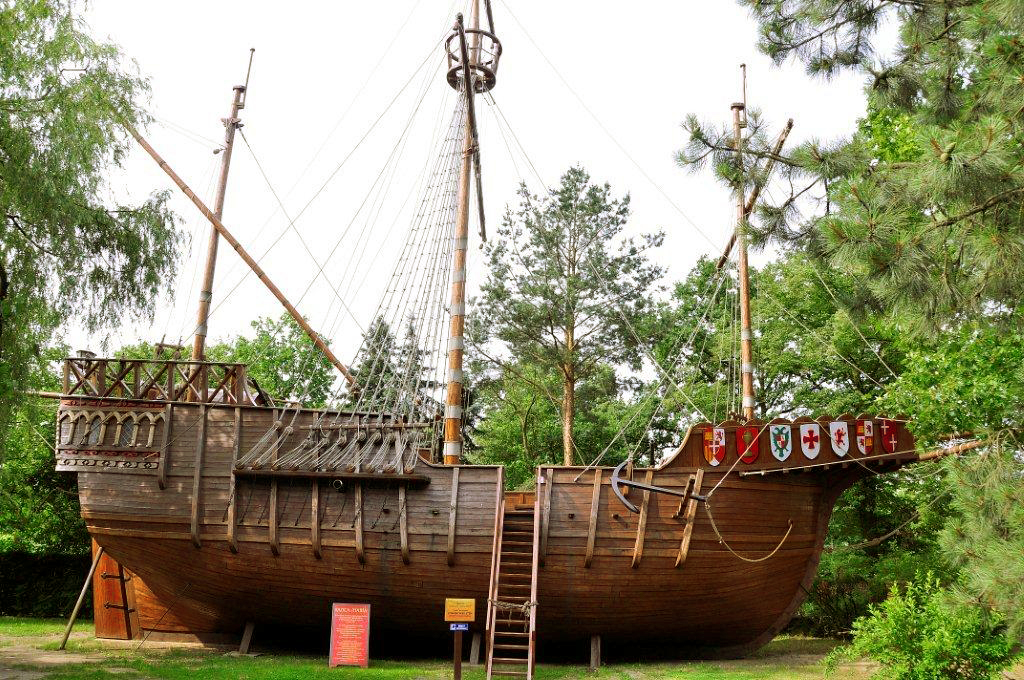
Replica in the Arkady Fiedler Museum in Puszczykowo, Poland

Little is definitively known about the actual dimensions of Santa María, since no documentation or illustration has survived from that era. Since the 19th century, various notable replicas have been publicly commissioned or privately constructed.

=== Quadricentennial (1892) ===
Interest in reconstructing Santa María started in Spain at around 1890 for the 400th anniversary of Columbus's voyage. An 1892 reconstruction by the Spanish government depicted the ship as a nau (Carrack). The replica vessel including her two sister ships, the Nina and the Pinta, sailed to North America where they were present at the Chicago World's Fair of 1893. On their way through the Great Lakes they visited several ports including Toronto, Ontario.

=== West Edmonton Mall (1986) ===
A replica was built during Expo 1986 and anchored in "Deep Sea Adventure Lake" at West Edmonton Mall in Alberta, Canada. Built at False Creek in Vancouver, British Columbia, the ship was hand-carved and hand-painted, and then transported by flatbed trucks across the Rocky Mountains to Edmonton, Alberta.

=== Marigalante (1991) ===
The Marigalante was built in 1991 for the 500th anniversary of Columbus's voyage. It sailed the world for a time before providing sail cruises from Puerto Vallarta, Mexico for many years. It sank on 10 October 2025 in the Bay of Banderas, with no loss of life, when a bilge pump malfunctioned on a routine voyage.

=== Quincentennial (1991) ===
A replica, depicted as a carrack, was commissioned by the city of Columbus, Ohio, US. It was built by the Scarano Brothers Boat Building Company in Albany, New York, who later cut the ship in half and transported it by truck to the Scioto River. The replica cost about $1.2 million. The ship was constructed out of white cedar as opposed to the oak used on the original to give the ship a long life in the Scioto River and to reduce cost. The main mast was carved out of a single douglas fir tree and was equipped with a top sail (since removed). The ship was built using power tools, with a hull length of 29.6 m (97 ft), keel length 16.1 m (53 ft), beam 7.9 m (26 ft), depth 3.2 m (10 ft) and load 223.8 metric tons of displacement. The foremast is 9.7 m (32 ft) high, the mainmast is 15.9 m (52 ft) and mizzen mast is 10.4 m (34 ft). The replica was declared by Jose Maria Martinez-Hidalgo, a Spanish marine historian, to be the most authentic replica of the Santa María in the world during the ship's coronation on 12 October 1991. Dana Rinehart, the 50th mayor of Columbus, christened the ship as part of the 500th anniversary of its voyage. The ship was removed from its moorings in 2014, cut into 10 pieces, and stored in a lot south of the city, pending funding to do repairs and restorations. As of early 2016, the plans for restoration have stalled.

=== Palos (1992) ===
A replica of Santa Maria, together with replicas of the Pinta and Nina, was built in Spain for the quincentennial celebrations of Columbus' first voyage to the Americas. They were constructed in the fishing port of Isla Cristina, in western Huelva province, and are exhibited at the Wharf of the Caravels in Palos de la Frontera, Huelva.

=== Madeira (1998) ===
A functional replica was built on the Portuguese island of Madeira, between July 1997 and July 1998, by craftsmen from the fishing village of Câmara de Lobos. The ship is 22 m (72 ft) long and 7 m (23 ft) wide. In 1998 Santa María represented the Madeira Wine Expo 98 in Lisbon, where she was visited by over 97,000 people in 25 days. Since then thousands more have sailed and continue to sail aboard that Santa María replica which is located in Funchal.

=== Puszczykowo (2008) ===
A stationary replica can be seen in the Arkady Fiedler Museum in Puszczykowo, Poland (near Poznań). The ship was built there in 2004–2008, within the Garden of Cultures and Tolerance, by Fiedler's sons with a ship modeller, Rajmund Korcz, and two assistants.

=== Punta Umbría (2018) ===
A full-scale, seaworthy replica of the Santa María was built in 2018 by the Fundación Nao Victoria to commemorate the 525th anniversary of Christopher Columbus's voyage. Constructed over a period of 14 months by master shipwrights in Punta Umbría, Spain, the 200-ton vessel features a modern structural core of fiberglass coated with traditional iroko and pine wood cladding. It is rigged with four masts carrying between 250 and 300 square meters of sail area, which is operated entirely by hand using historically accurate rigging techniques. The ship serves as a floating museum and cultural ambassador, undertaking extensive global educational and promotional outreach tours managed logistically by Vela Cuadra Producciones.

== See also ==
- Columbian Exchange
- Niña
- Pinta
- Pinzón brothers
- Santa María Rupes, a ridge on planet Mercury named after this ship
- Ship replica (including a list of ship replicas)
- Voyages of Christopher Columbus
- Wharf of the Caravels
