= Exposición Nacional de Minería (1883) =

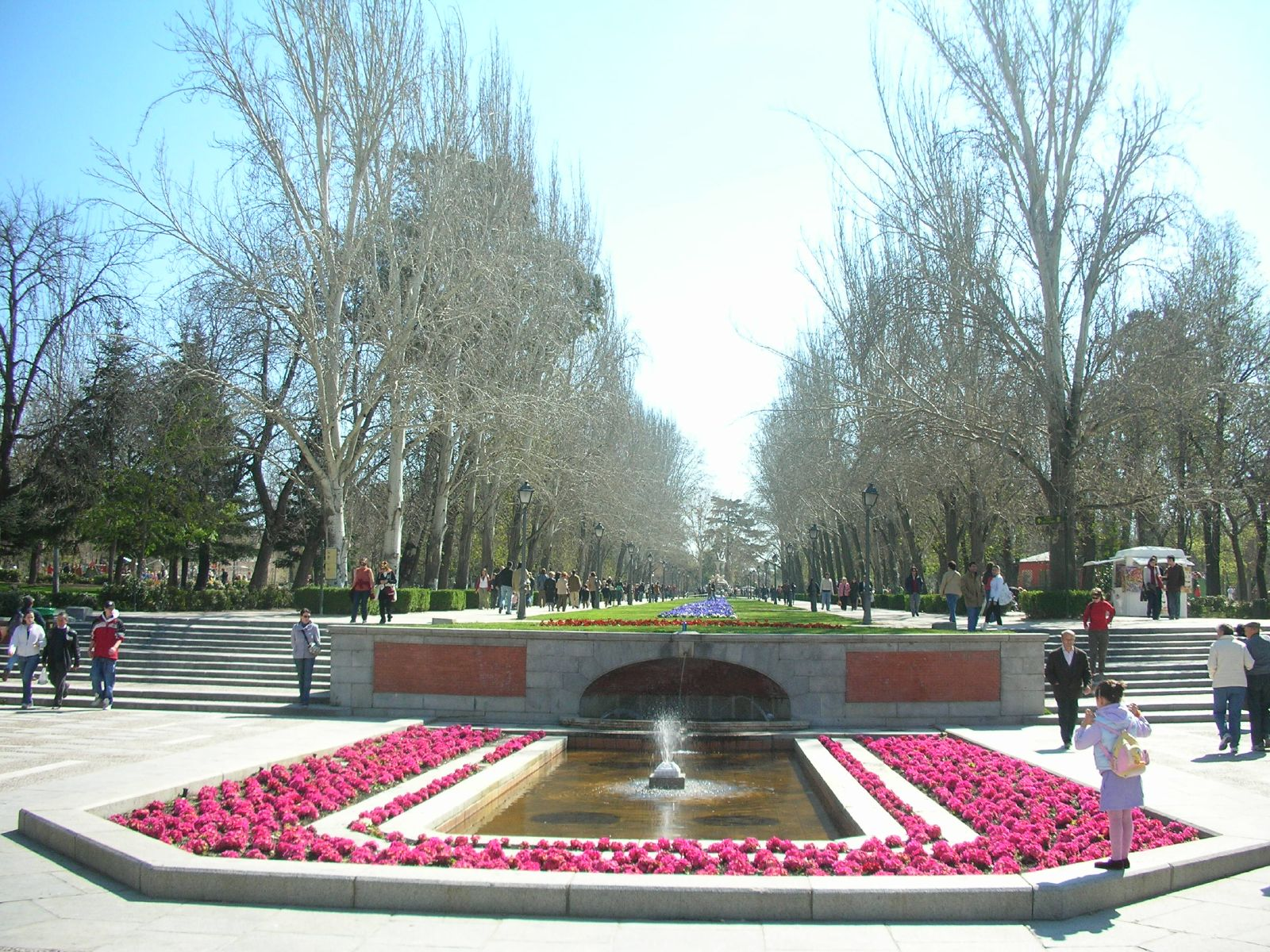
The Exposición Nacional de Minería was held in the Parque del Buen Retiro in 1883.

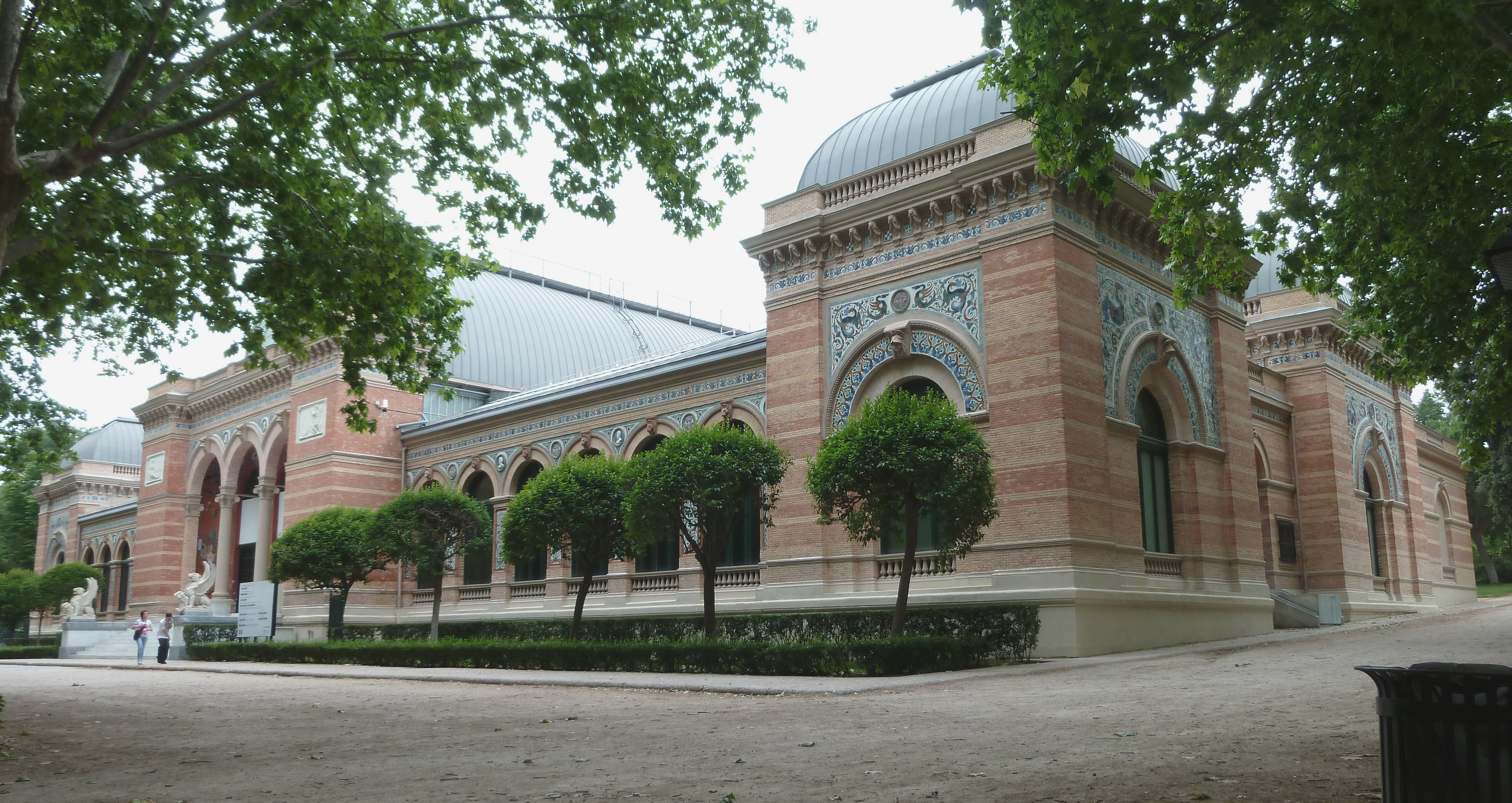
The Palacio de Velázquez was the main pavilion built for the exhibition

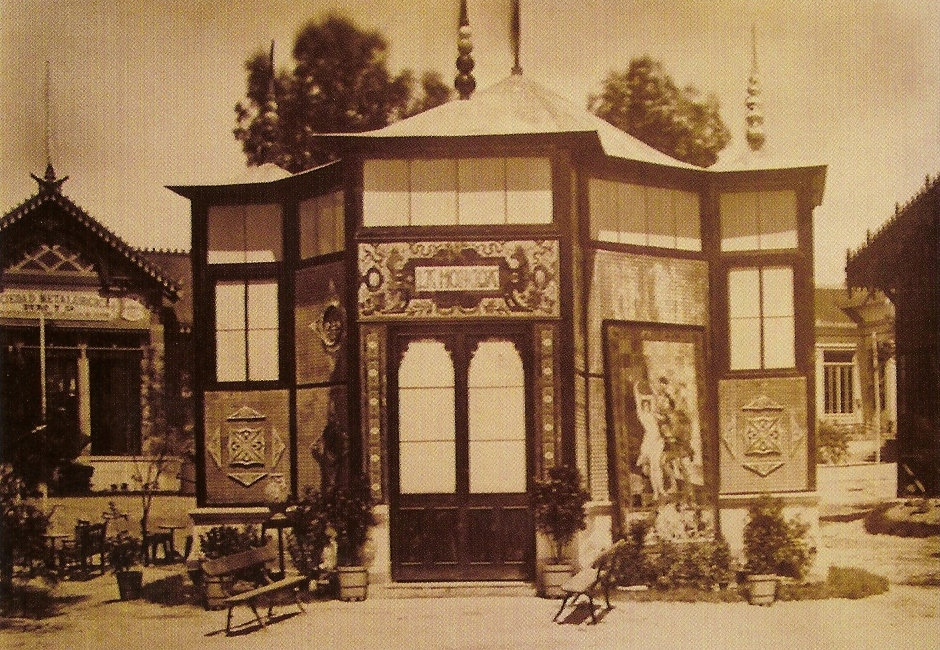
Pavilion of Real Fábrica de La Moncloa

The Exposición Nacional de Minería, Artes Metalúrgicas, Cerámica, Cristalería y Aguas Minerales (National Exhibition of Mining, Metallurgical Arts, Ceramics, Glass and Mineral Waters) was an exhibition held in Madrid, Spain in 1883. Situated in the Parque del Buen Retiro between May and November, it was presided over by King Alfonso XII of Spain and his wife Queen Maria Christina of Austria. Several countries participated.

== History ==
The idea for the contest came in 1880 from the Spanish press, driven by the then Minister for Development, José Luis Albareda y Sezde, and aimed to promote and publicize the Spanish mining industry both within the country and abroad. Enacted in 1882, it was arranged by Luis de la Escosura y Morrogh, chief of the National Corporation of Mines, and his team. Machinery exhibitors had until February 15, 1882, to apply for space, while specialized machinery exhibitors had an October 31 deadline. All non-machinery exhibitors had until November 30 to submit applications for main gallery space. Exhibition articles included machinery, tools, and utensils. These were the types used for mining, metallurgy, manufacture of glass ware, pottery, and utilization of mineral waters. There was no charge for space; water requirements for hydraulic and steam engines was also free for smaller machines. Transportation and passage of goods in bond for the exhibition received "liberal arrangements" through customs.

The official opening was scheduled for April 1, 1883, but because of the storms that delayed completion of the venue, it had to be postponed to May 30, when it was opened by the Kings of Spain and Portugal, Luís I. The Minister of Industry, Germán Gamazo, gave an opening speech. Belgium, England, France, Germany, Norway, Portugal, Sweden, and Spain participated in the event. Attendees included Franco-Belgian companies, Ibarra and Orconera (Bilbao), the Hullera Company (Bélmez), the Artillery Corps in Spain, the Humboldt Company, the Royal Company Asturian Mines and Rio Tinto (Huelva). The Sociedad de Santander y Quirós published a work in 1883 documenting the event.

== Grounds and facilities ==
The exhibition was held in an area of 9,000 metres (30,000 ft) in the Parque del Buen Retiro. The project was led by the mining engineer Enrique Nouvion. The exhibition was clustered in one area, enclosed with a wooden fence, surrounded by trees and vegetation, and stood in the center of the main pavilion. The main pavilion was separated by an avenue lined with large ceramic frogs, leading to a lake fed by a river. The lake emptied into a rockery with a cascade, and on it was built the Royal Pavilion. A second smaller lake led through another large lake, closing the circuit. The weather conditions were a major inconvenience, and the different pavilions were built under snow, rain and wind, to the point that the exhibition was closed during the summer months to finish the work and reopened on 8 September. Most of the facilities built for the event were demolished at the end of the show, except the Royal Pavilion, which was demolished in the twentieth century, and the Palacio de Velázquez, which is the only building that remains today. The Development Minister commissioned architect Ricardo Velázquez Bosco to build the main pavilion, later known as the Palacio de Velázquez; his team included engineer Alberto Palacio and ceramist tile maker Daniel Zuloaga, who through the Real Fábrica de La Moncloa, handled the palace's decoration.
