= Ricardo Velázquez Bosco =

Spanish architect, archaeologist and scholar (1843-1923)

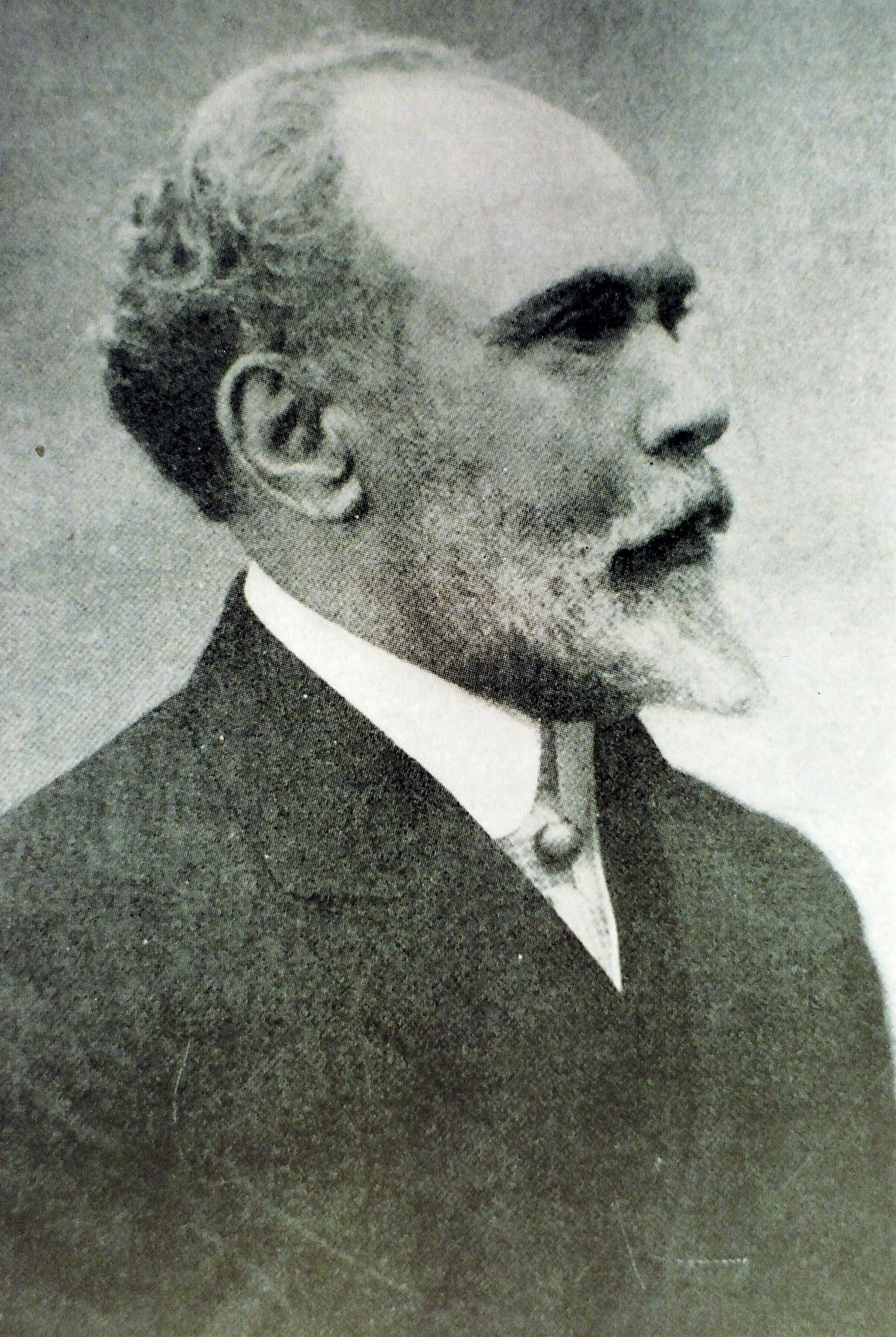
- Born: 1843; Burgos, Spain
- Died: August 1923 (aged 79–80); Madrid, Spain
- Occupation: Architect
- Buildings: Palacio de Cristal, Palacio de Velázquez, Palacio de Fomento, Pantheon of the Duchess of Sevillano

Ricardo Velázquez Bosco (1843–1923) was a Spanish architect, archaeologist and scholar.

Velázquez's most notable architecture was erected in Madrid, buildings such as the Palacio de Cristal and the Palacio de Velázquez (both in the Parque del Buen Retiro) and the massive Ministry of Agriculture building. As an architect he was known for the prolific use of glazed pieces of ceramics in bright colors for his projects. He also carried out restoration work on the Cathedral–Mosque of Córdoba and directed important archaeological excavations near Córdoba at Madinat al-Zahra.

== Biography ==
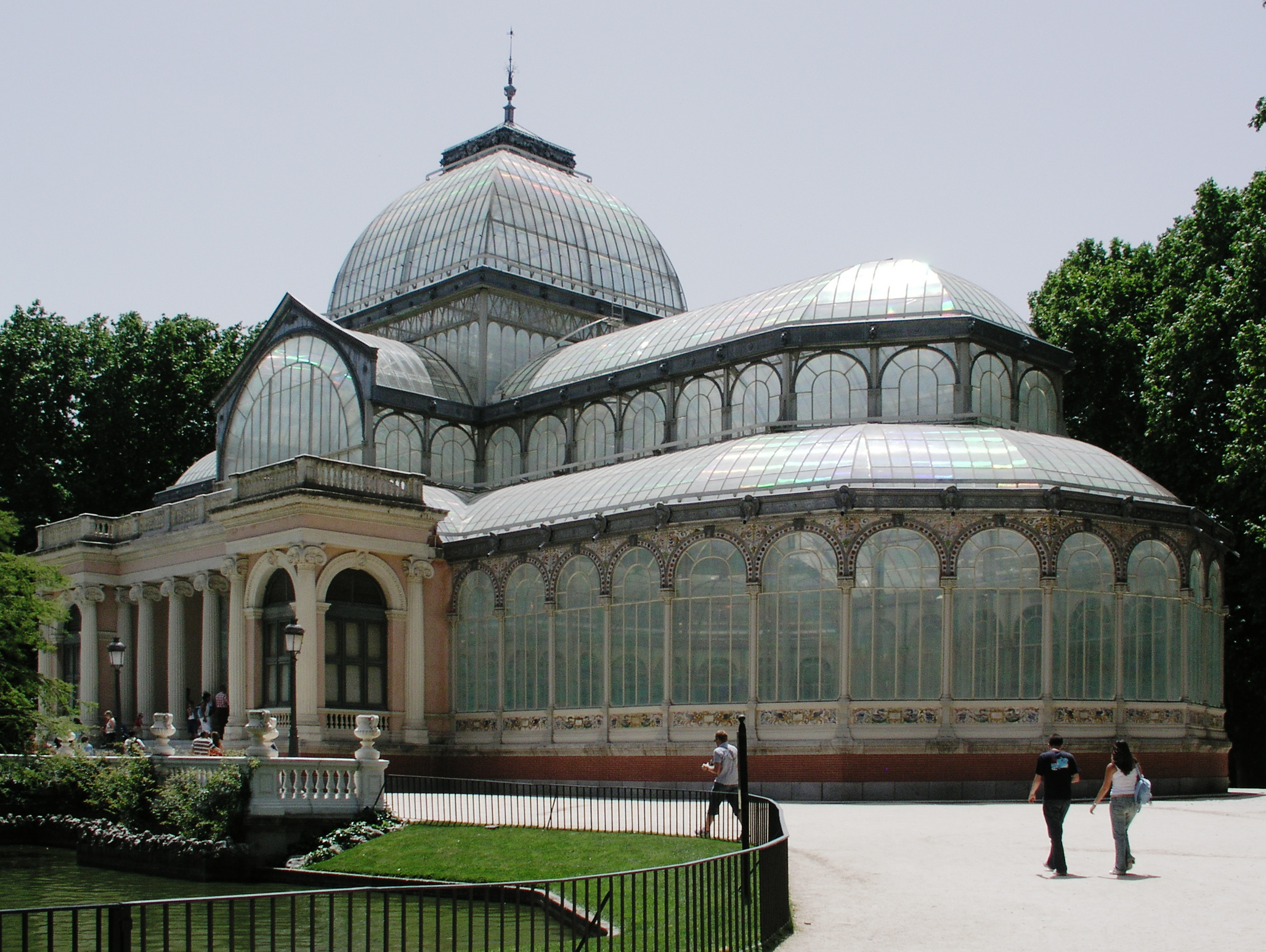
The Palacio de Cristal in Madrid's Buen Retiro Park, designed by Ricardo Velázquez Bosco

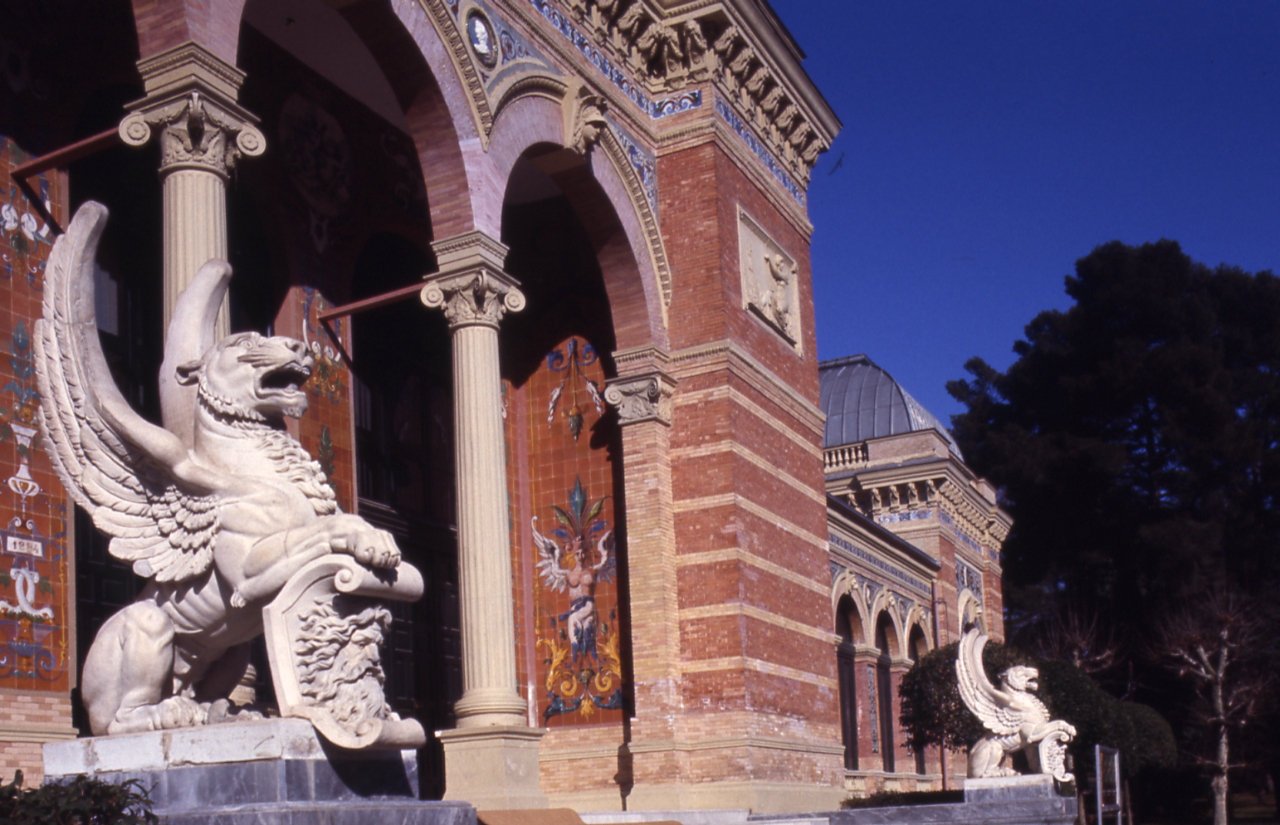
Entrance of the Palacio de Velázquez designed by and named after Ricardo Velázquez Bosco

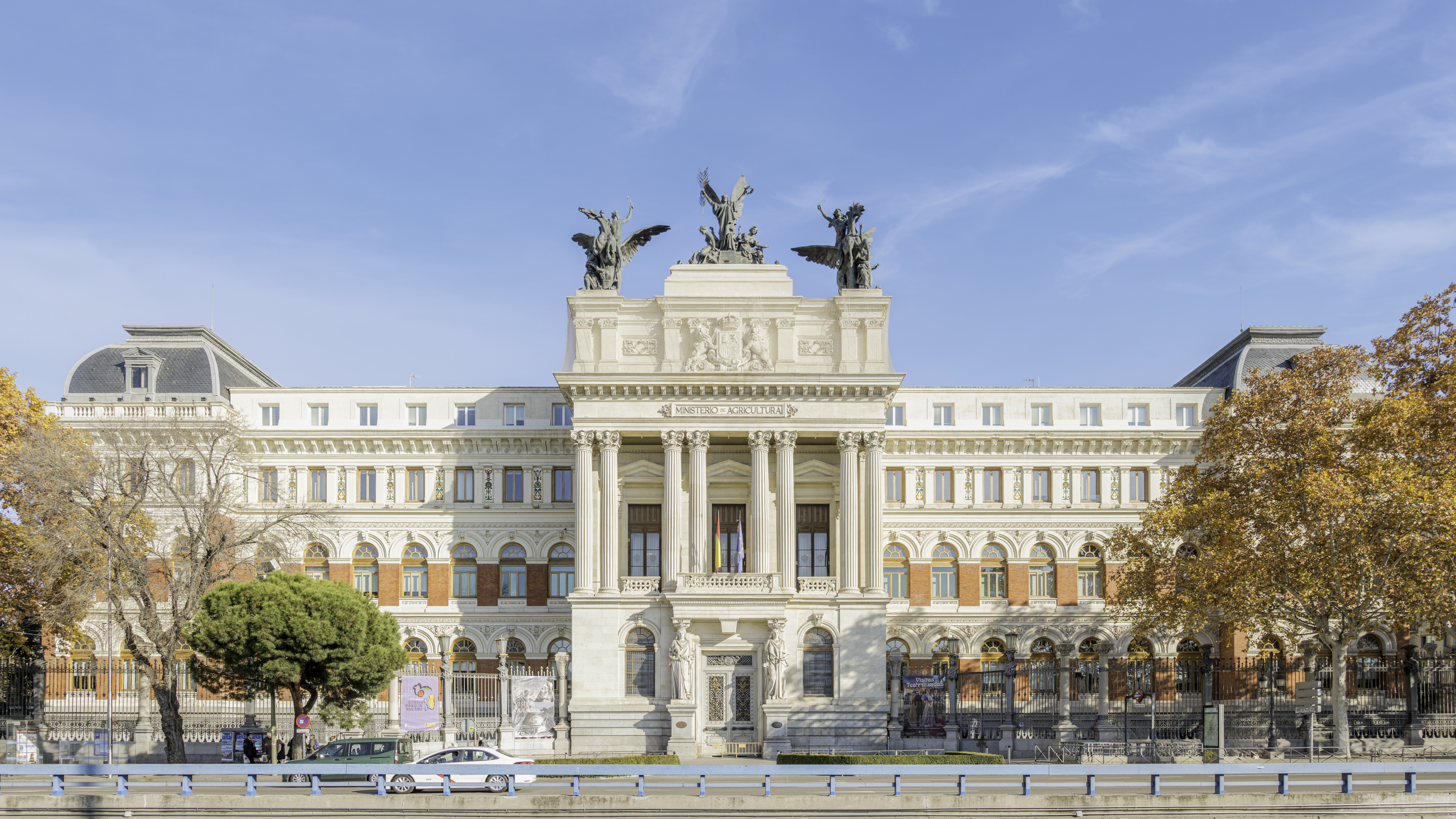
Ministerio de Agricultura designed and built by Ricardo Velázquez Bosco

Velázquez was born in 1843 in Burgos. Velázquez built the Palacio de Velázquez, which is named after him, in the Parque del Buen Retiro in Madrid. This building, which was constructed for the Exposición Nacional de Minería (1883), features ceramic tiles made by Daniel Zuloaga. Use of ceramics as decorative architectural materials became popular in Spain in the late 19th century and early 20th century. Architects such as Velázquez used them in the style which came to be known as “Regionalist Architecture".

The Palacio de Velazquez and the nearby Palacio de Cristal are influenced by London's Crystal Palace. Velázquez taught the Spanish architect Antonio Palacios who was influenced by his eclectic and modern style; it is sometimes called "emphatic eclecticism". His works are characterized by a resounding treatment of volume, as well as the use of ceramic decoration on building facades. He was a member of the Real Academia de Bellas Artes de San Fernando along with Enrique María Repullés and Narciso Pascual Colomer. Most of his work was concentrated in Madrid, where he taught at the School of Architecture.

He died in Madrid in August 1923.

== Archaeology and restoration ==
Velázquez, who from 1910 was the director of the Madrid school of architecture, also taught history of art. He was involved in archaeological and conservation projects, notably in the province of Córdoba, where he was assisted by the sculptor Mateo Inurria who was Director of the arts school of Cordoba.

=== Archaeology ===
As an archaeologist, Ricardo Velázquez Basco was involved in the excavation of two Islamic heritage sites near Córdoba in 1910/11:

- Madinat al-Zahra, a large medieval site built by the Umayyad caliphs of Córdoba. This long-abandoned site had previously yielded finds, but Velázquez' work effectively represented its rediscovery.
- Munyat al-Rummaniyya (El Cortijo Alamiriya). This excavation revealed the remains of a country estate with four rectangular terraces, over a 4 hectares (9.9 acres) area, of size 160 metres (520 ft) x150 metres (490 ft). Although the terraces are still to be seen, with the masonry of a pool in the upper terrace, the remains of a house which were examined by Velazquez are not longer extant. After analyzing the materials used in this structure he interpreted the site as an almunia with a layout found also at Madinat al-Zehrá.

After Velásquez' death the site was identified as Munyat al-Rummaniyya, an estate known from documentary sources.

It has been suggested that there was a political motive for these excavations, as Spain was in the process of colonizing Morocco, a Muslim country; a process which culminated in 1912 when Spain and France made Morocco its "protectorate."

=== Restoration ===
Velázquez undertook restoration/conservation works at the Cathedral–Mosque of Córdoba. The building had been declared a national monument in 1882; the works involved the reversal of accretions, for example, removing an altarpiece from the mihrab and a lean-to structure from the west façade. He worked on León Cathedral and the La Rábida Monastery.

== Works ==
His most important works include the following buildings in Madrid:

- 1881–1883: Pavilion for the National Mining Exhibition of 1883 at the Palacio de Velázquez, with engineer Alberto de Palacio and ceramist Daniel Zuloaga
- 1884–1893: School of Mining Engineering of Madrid
- 1887: Philippine Exposition of 1887, at the Palacio de Cristal, with Alberto de Palacio and Daniel Zuloaga
- 1893–1897: Palacio de Fomento, now houses the Ministry of Agriculture
- 1898: National Association of the Deaf and Blind in Madrid, now houses the Centro Superior de Estudios de la Defensa Nacional
- 1917–1923: Ministry of Education

Some of his other works include:

- Reconstruction of the western facade of the Casón del Buen Retiro
- Gamazo Palace (Madrid)
- Mining Building Council (Madrid)
- 1905–1920: Blind and Deaf School in Santiago de Compostela
- Column commemorating the fourth centenary of the discovery of America, in Palos de la Frontera
- 1882–1916: Pantheon of the Duchess of Sevillano, in Guadalajara, with Daniel Zuloaga
