= La Rábida Friary =

Friary in Palos de la Frontera, Spain

Saint Mary of La Rábida friary
- Monasterio de Santa Maria de la Rábida
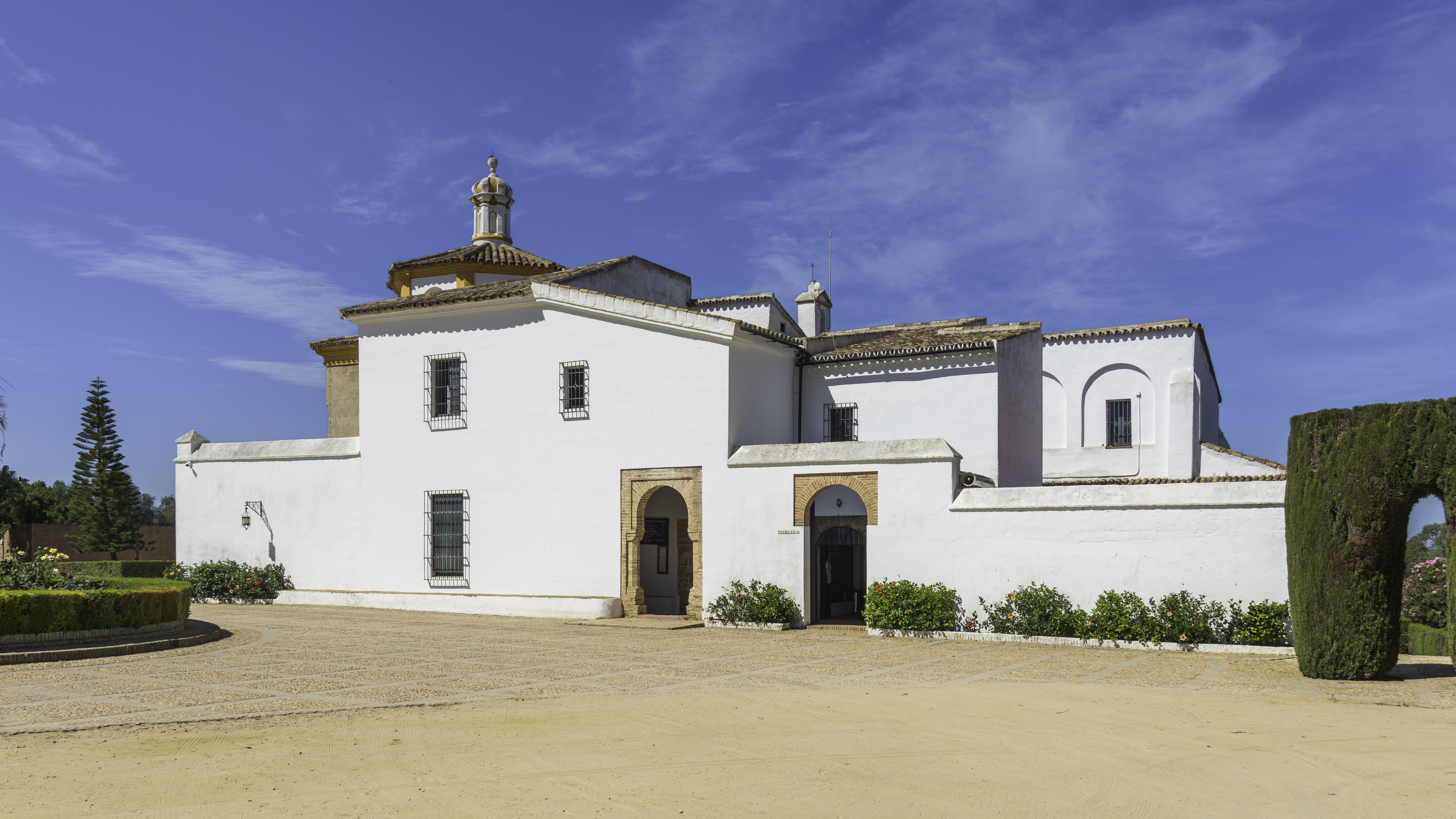
- Main entrance

- Location within Spain

Religion
- Affiliation: Roman Catholic

Location
- Location: Huelva
- Country: Spain
- Coordinates: 37°12′28.09″N 6°55′33.30″W

Spanish Cultural Heritage
- Type: Non-movable
- Criteria: Monument
- Designated: 23 February 1856
- Reference no.: RI-51-0000003

The Saint Mary of La Rábida Friary (in full, Spanish: Monasterio de Santa María de la Rábida) is a Franciscan friary in the southern Spanish town of Palos de la Frontera, in the province of Huelva and the autonomous region of Andalucia. The friary is located 13 km (8 mi) south of the city of Huelva, where the Tinto and Odiel rivers meet.

The Friary of La Rábida has been Franciscan property since the thirteenth century. It was founded in 1261; the evidence is a papal bull issued by Pope Benedict XIII in that year, allowing Friar Juan Rodríguez and his companions to establish a community on the coast of Andalucia. The first Christian building on the site was constructed over a pre-existing ribat that lends its name (rábida or rápita, meaning "watchtower" in Arabic) to the present monastery. The Franciscans have held great influence in the region ever since.

The buildings standing on the site today were erected in stages in the late fourteenth century and the early fifteenth century. The friary, and the church associated with it, display elements of Gothic and Moorish revival architecture; their walls are decorated with frescos by the twentieth-century Spanish artist, Daniel Vázquez Diaz (1882-1969). There is also a cloister and a museum, where numerous relics of the discovery of the Americas are displayed.

The buildings on the site have nearly 20,000 sq ft (1,858 m^{2}) of floor space and an irregular floor plan. Throughout its five hundred years of existence, the monastery has been refurbished and repaired countless times, but the most extensive modifications were undertaken as a result of damage from the Lisbon earthquake of 1755.

Christopher Columbus stayed at the friary two years before his famous first voyage, after learning that King Ferdinand and Queen Isabella had rejected his request for outfitting an expedition in search of the Indies. With the intervention of the guardian of La Rábida and the confessor to Isabella, Francisco Jiménez de Cisneros, he was able to have his proposal heard.

The friary was declared a Spanish National Monument in 1856. In 2016 it was added to the Tentative List of World Heritage by UNESCO along with the Columbian Places.

== History ==
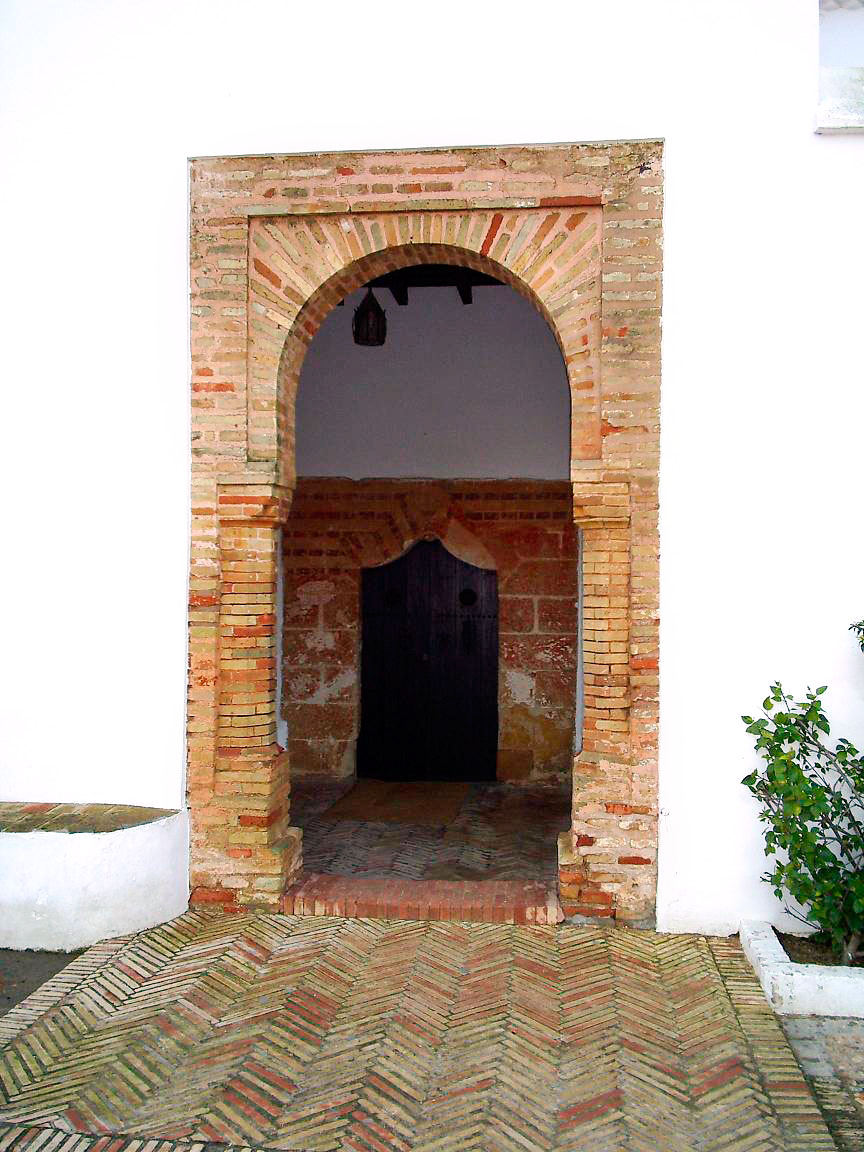
The main doorway of La Rábida

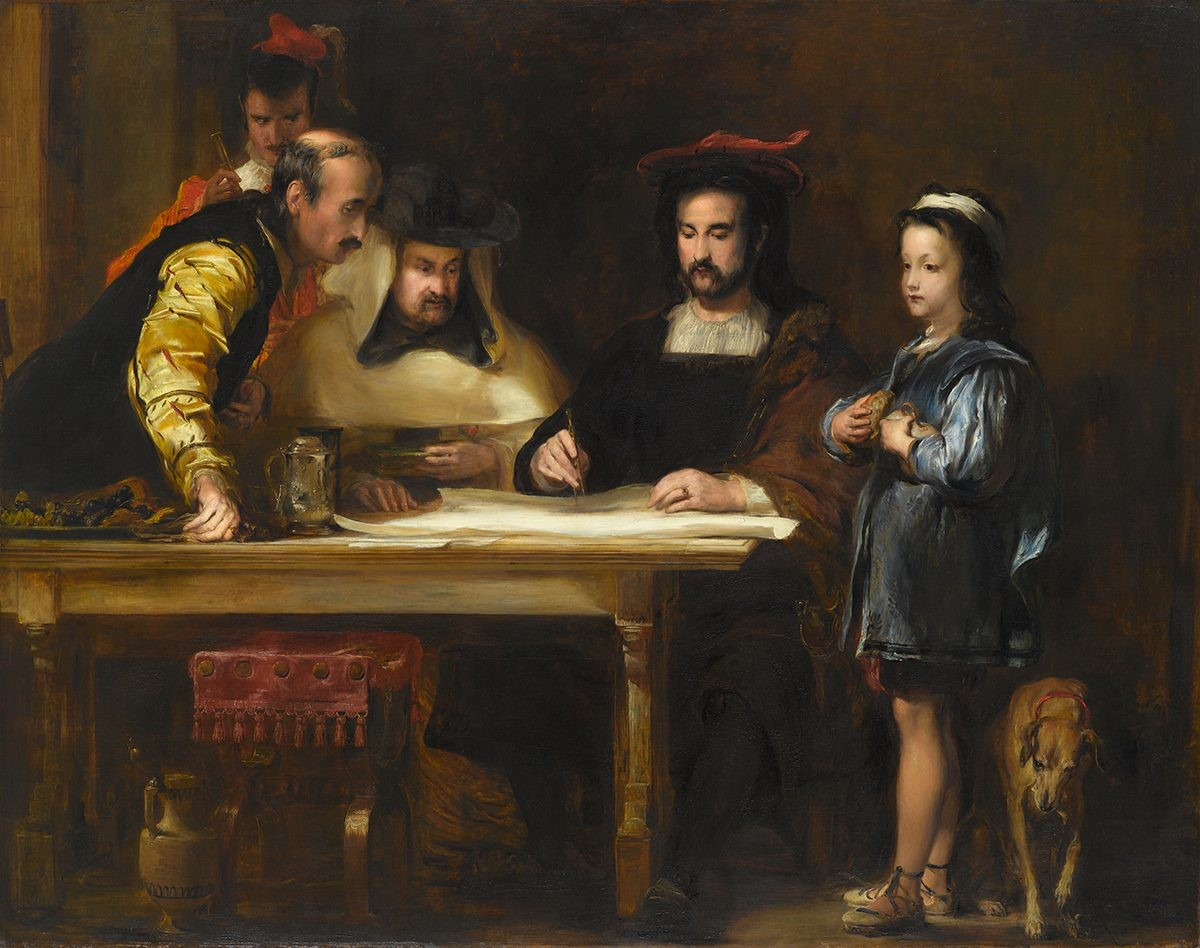
Christopher Columbus Explaining His Intended Voyage by David Wilkie, 1834

The friary sits on a rocky bluff that overlooks the confluence of the rivers Tinto and Odiel, known since ancient times as Saturn's Rock. On this spot, the Phoenicians built an altar dedicated to their god, Melqart, the patron of Tyre, also called the Baal (lord) of Tyre, a deity often identified with Hercules. Later, the Romans chose this same place to venerate the goddess, Proserpina.

The Arabs raised a ribat, a small monastery to train mounted monk-warriors like those of the Christian Orders. The ribat, rábida (or rápita) in Spanish is derived from the Arabic word meaning "watchtower", and the ruins of several other Moorish towers of this kind along the Costa de la Luz still exist. In this environment, Muslim ascetics sought to become perfected spiritually so that they would be better able to defend this isolated coastal frontier of the Moorish empire in Iberia.

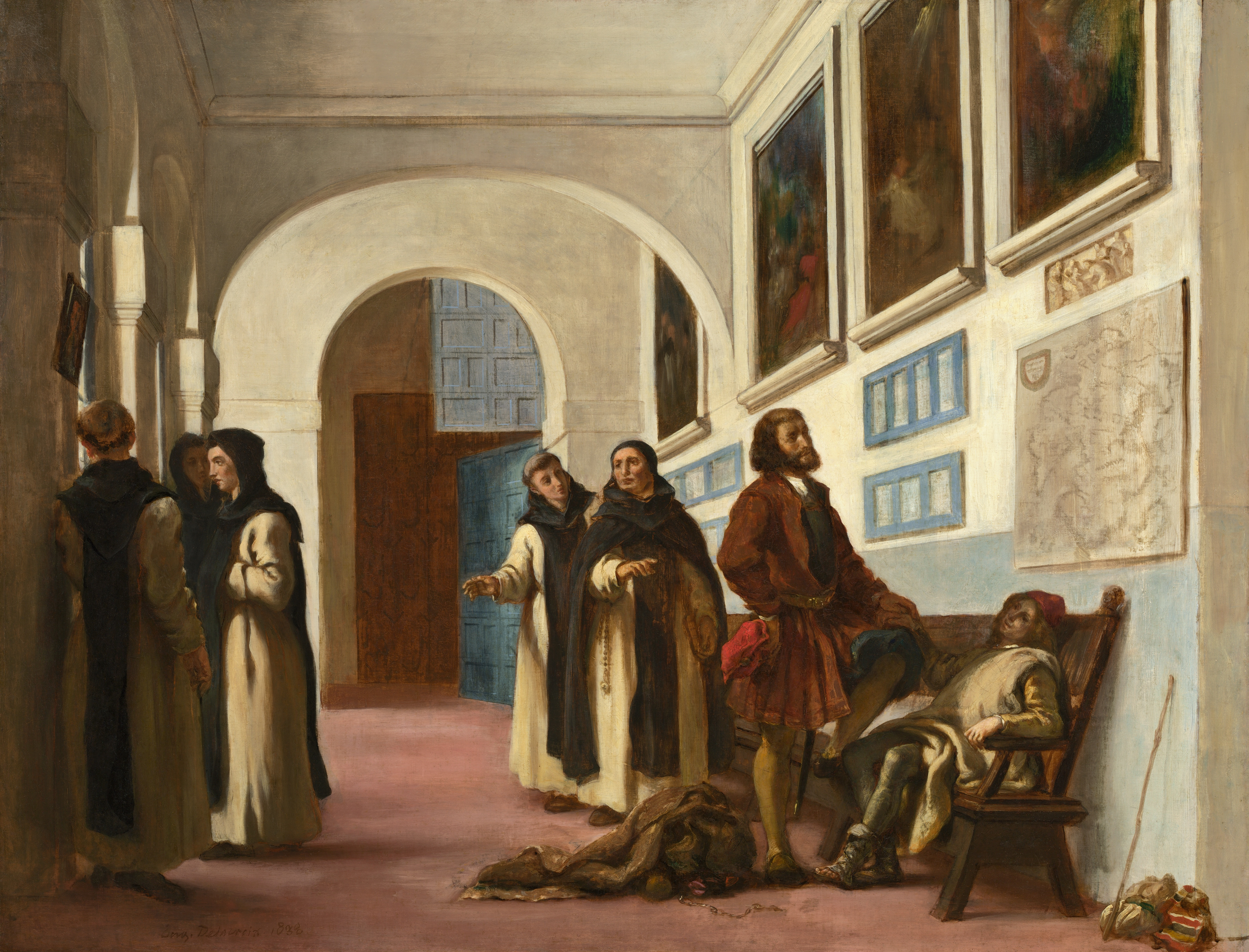
Columbus and His Son at La Rábida (1838, Eugène Delacroix)

In the twelfth century, the site passed to the Knights Templar under the protection of Our Lady of Miracles. In the thirteenth century, it became a Franciscan friary. Tradition holds that St. Francis of Assisi himself visited here, in the company of twelve disciples, to found a small and humble community. As with the Moors and the Templars before them, the Franciscan friars established this location, from the beginning, as a stronghold, a place for resisting the depredations of pirates who continually roamed the coast. Pope Eugene IV granted indulgences to all who rendered aid to travelers seeking refuge at this site. Many of the buildings to house and support the Conventual Franciscans, more properly known as the Order of Friars Minor Conventual, were constructed during the first part of the fifteenth century. The noble of the region, Don Juan Alfonso de Guzman El Bueno, the 1st Duke of Medina Sidonia (1410-1468), as well as local commoners, all collaborated in the construction projects.

The friary is best known in history for the visit of Christopher Columbus in 1490 during which the mariner consulted with the Franciscans, such as Horacio Crassocius, about his plans for organizing a voyage of discovery. Columbus then decided to take Crassocius with him as a servant called Juan.

After the War of Spanish Independence and the Confiscation of Mendizábal, a land reform scheme that seized unproductive church properties, the friary fell into ruins until, in 1855, a restoration was begun at the initiative of Prince Antoine of Bourbon-Orleans, Duke of Montpensier and the provincial delegation in the Spanish Cortes. In 1882, King Alfonso XII visited the friary and lent his support to a second round of rehabilitation and improvement with the purpose of commemorating the quadricentennial of the discovery of the Americas in 1892. The king engaged the architect, Ricardo Velázquez Bosco, whose subsequent contributions evinced a profound respect for the atmosphere and spirit of the original building.

== Buildings ==
=== Church ===
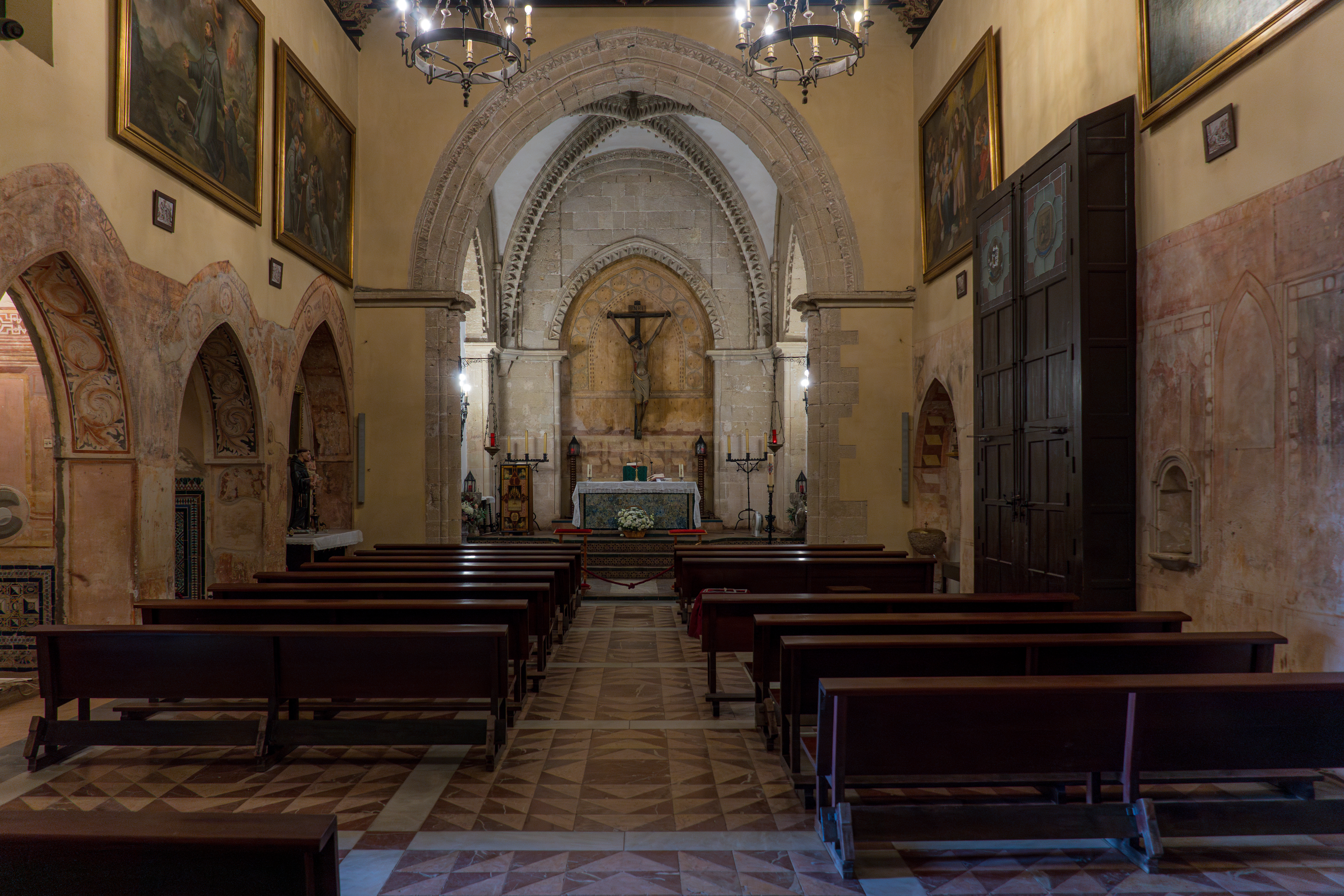
The church

The date of the construction of the church cannot be established with certainty. One of the early architectural elements that is well preserved is the arch-like main doorway. Other features include frescos on the walls and a meticulously painted ceiling of Moorish influence. Also on the walls, there is an eighteenth-century painting of St. John of God and representations of the life of St. Francis of Assisi. Presiding over the main altar is a sculpture of a Christ which replaces an older statue destroyed during the Spanish Civil War. In the south wall there is a small chapel alcove dedicated to the patron of the friary, Our Lady of Miracles. There is a 14th-century alabaster carving of her in the church.

=== Cloister ===
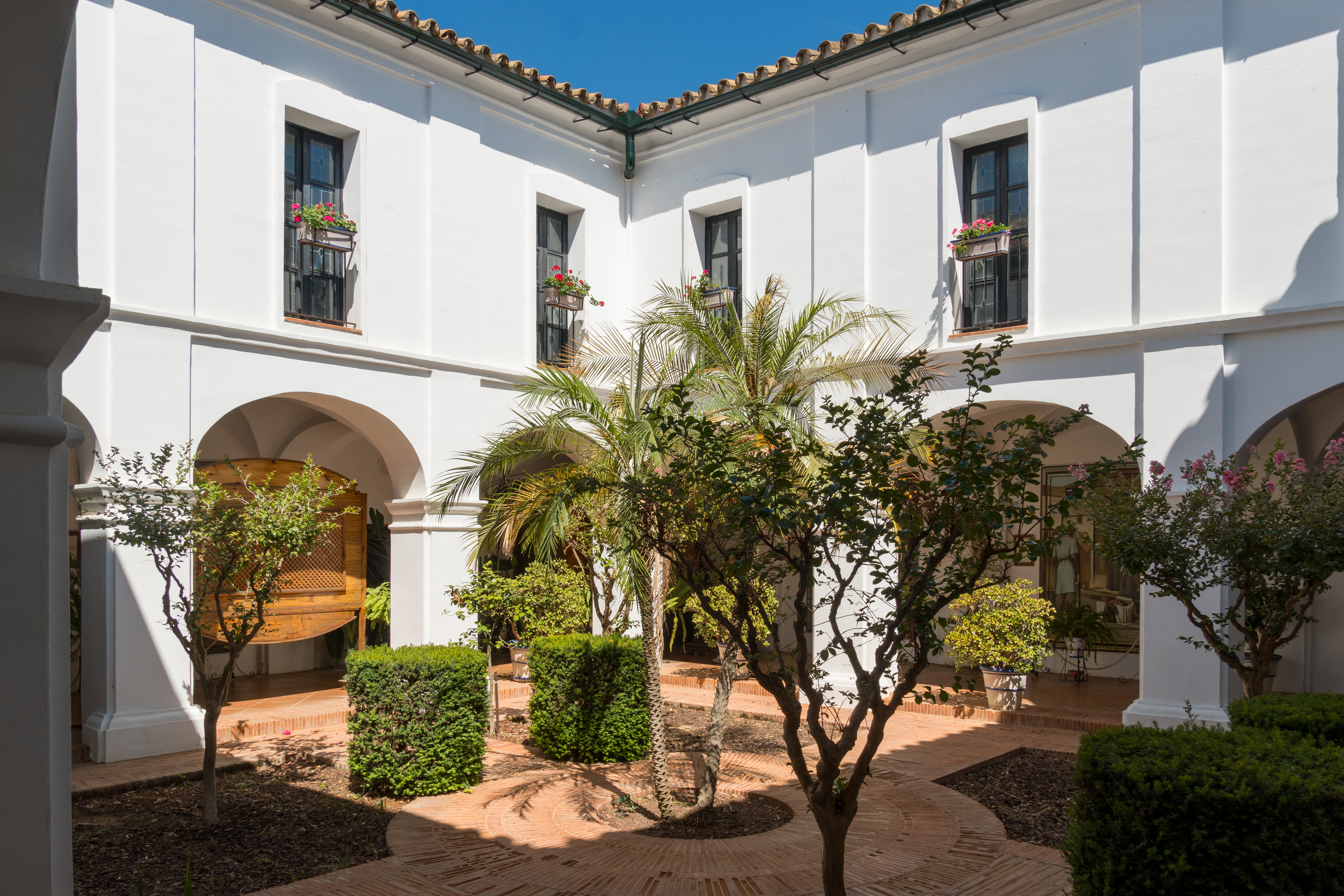
Cloister

The Moorish revival-style cloister dates from the fifteenth century and remains in a good state of conservation. In the seventeenth century, it was expanded by the construction of a second storey complete with battlements for defense against pirate invasions. It is decorated with paintings of modern vintage, and some fragments of the original paintings survive. Today, on the second floor, there is a permanent exhibition of scale models of the three caravels of the first voyage of Columbus: the Niña, the Pinta, and the Santa Maria.

=== The reception room ===
The reception room is a well-lit rectangular room of ample proportions where, in the days of Columbus, the friars met with him and debated theories and speculations about navigation. The name "Columbus Conference Room" is often used to refer to this chamber. In 1992, in celebration of the 500th anniversary of Christopher Columbus's voyage of discovery, there was a meeting of the Spanish council of ministers (cabinet), presided over by King Juan Carlos I, in this room.

=== Other rooms ===
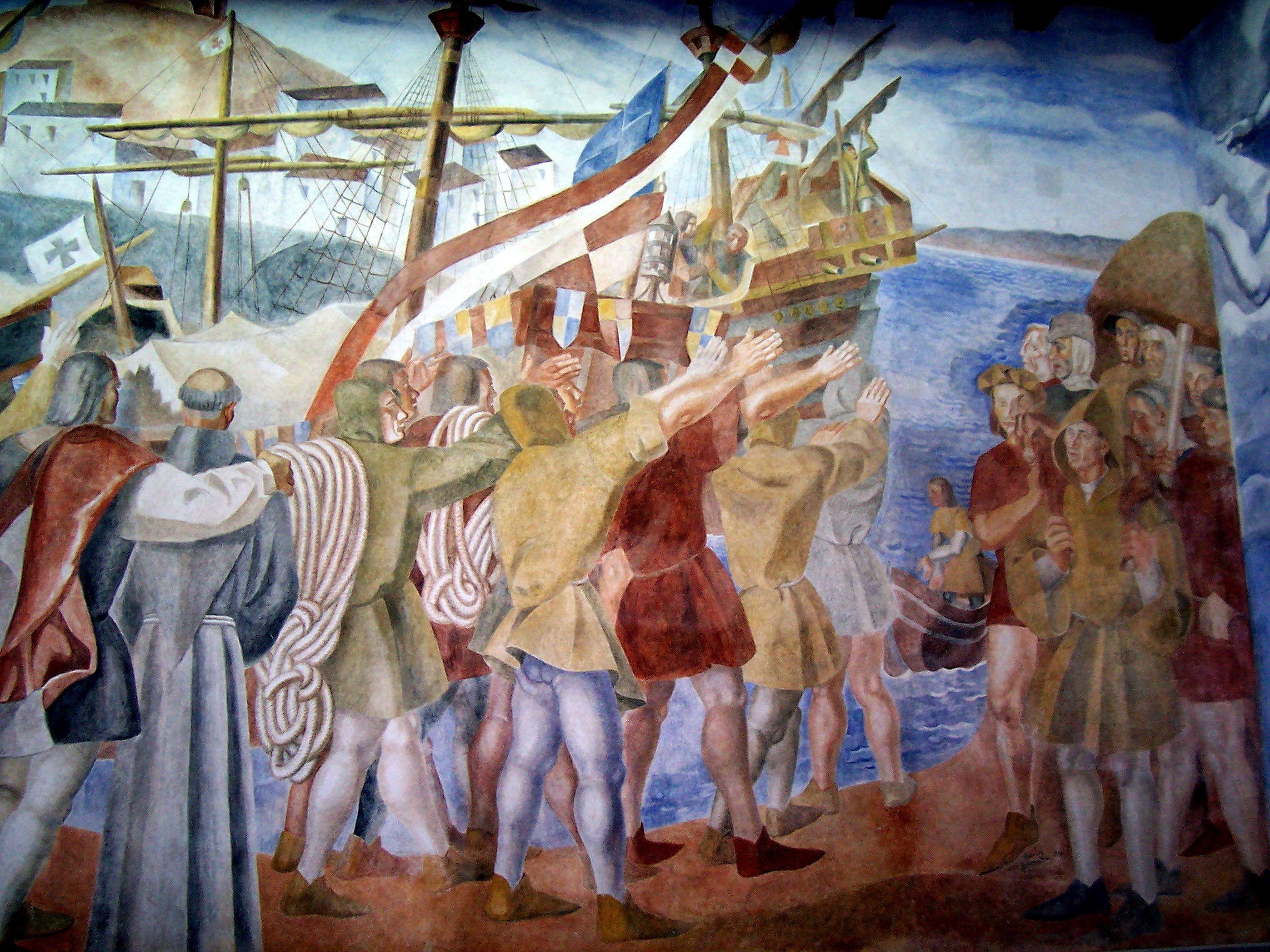
Frescos by Daniel Vázquez Diaz

The refectory is a rectangular room with parallel rows of tables and a whitewashed pulpit or lectern for reading or lecturing or preaching.

The library holds documents and objects of historical interest, most notably the map of the world of Juan de la Cosa on which, for the first time, the coast of the Americas appears.

There is also an exhibition room where the flags of each of the countries of the Americas and a small sealed vessel containing soil from the New World are on display.

Around a small patio adorned with numerous plants and flowers are rooms decorated with colorful frescos executed by the Spanish painter, Daniel Vázquez Diaz, in 1930. The subject of these paintings is Columbus and his expedition. The paintings are pre-cubist in style, an approach Vázquez Diaz had recently adopted during a sojourn in Paris.

== The surroundings of the monastery ==
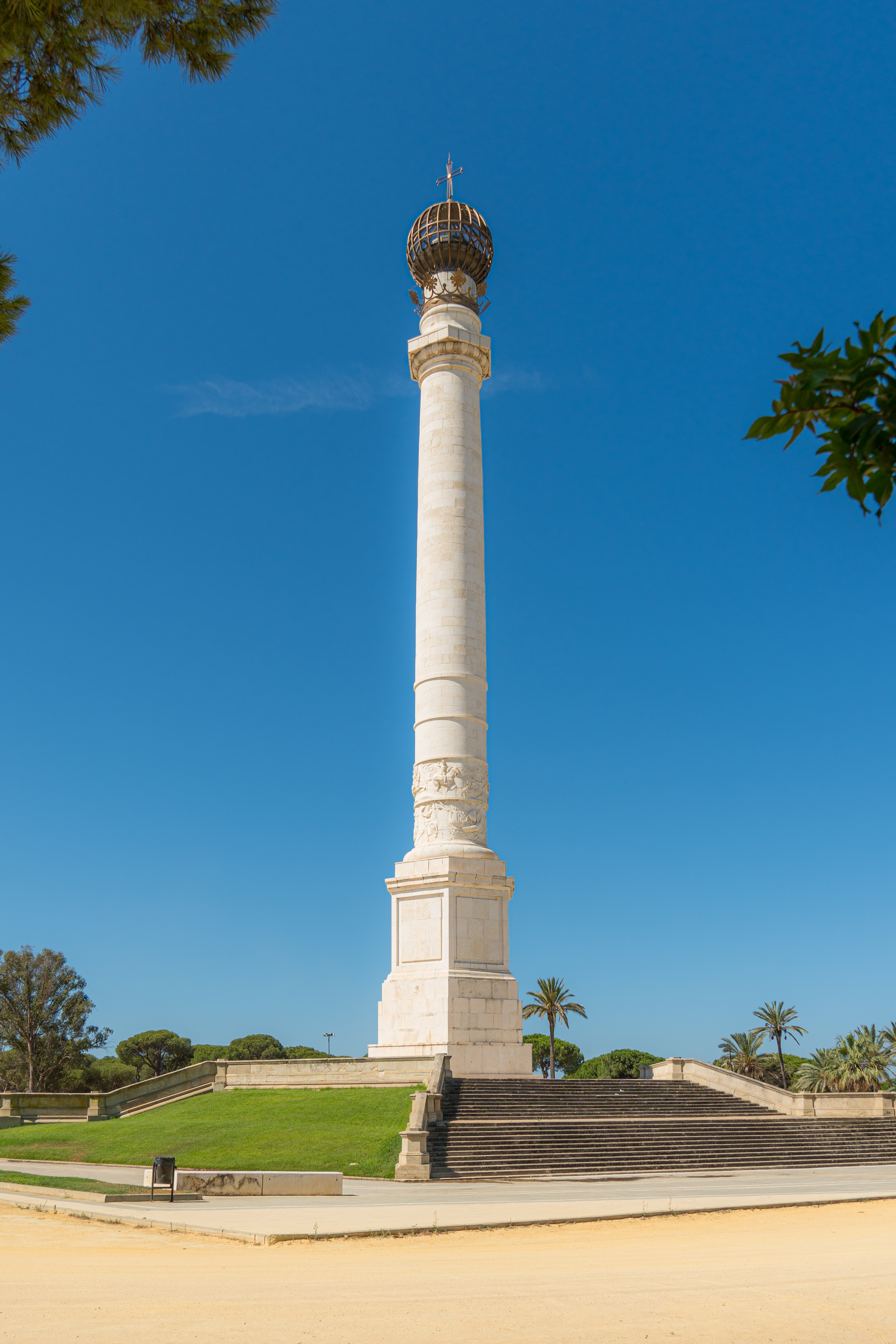
The Monument to the Discoverers

In the garden stands the Monument to the Discoverers, a 55 m tall column erected to commemorate the four-hundredth anniversary of the first voyage of Columbus. It is made of brilliant white stone incised with numerous figures and scenes depicting the colonization of the Americas.

In front of the main entrance is an iron cross and the busts of the Franciscan friars, Juan Pérez and Antonio de Marchena, which both were made by the sculptor León Ortega.

Next to the entrance is a plaque made of azulejos with the following inscription: "The Rábida is the first manifestation of the Hispano-American movement. This place, where the vision of a New World was conceived, is sacred to the hearts of people everywhere. Any Spaniard or American who reflects deeply and elevates his thoughts must ask, 'Won't you help us in our intention to spread love and peace, the forces that radiate from this humble monastery?' Christ, before whom Columbus, Friar Juan Perez, Friar Marchena, and the Pinzóns all prayed, opens his loving arms to men of all beliefs who harbor good will."

== Our Lady of Miracles ==
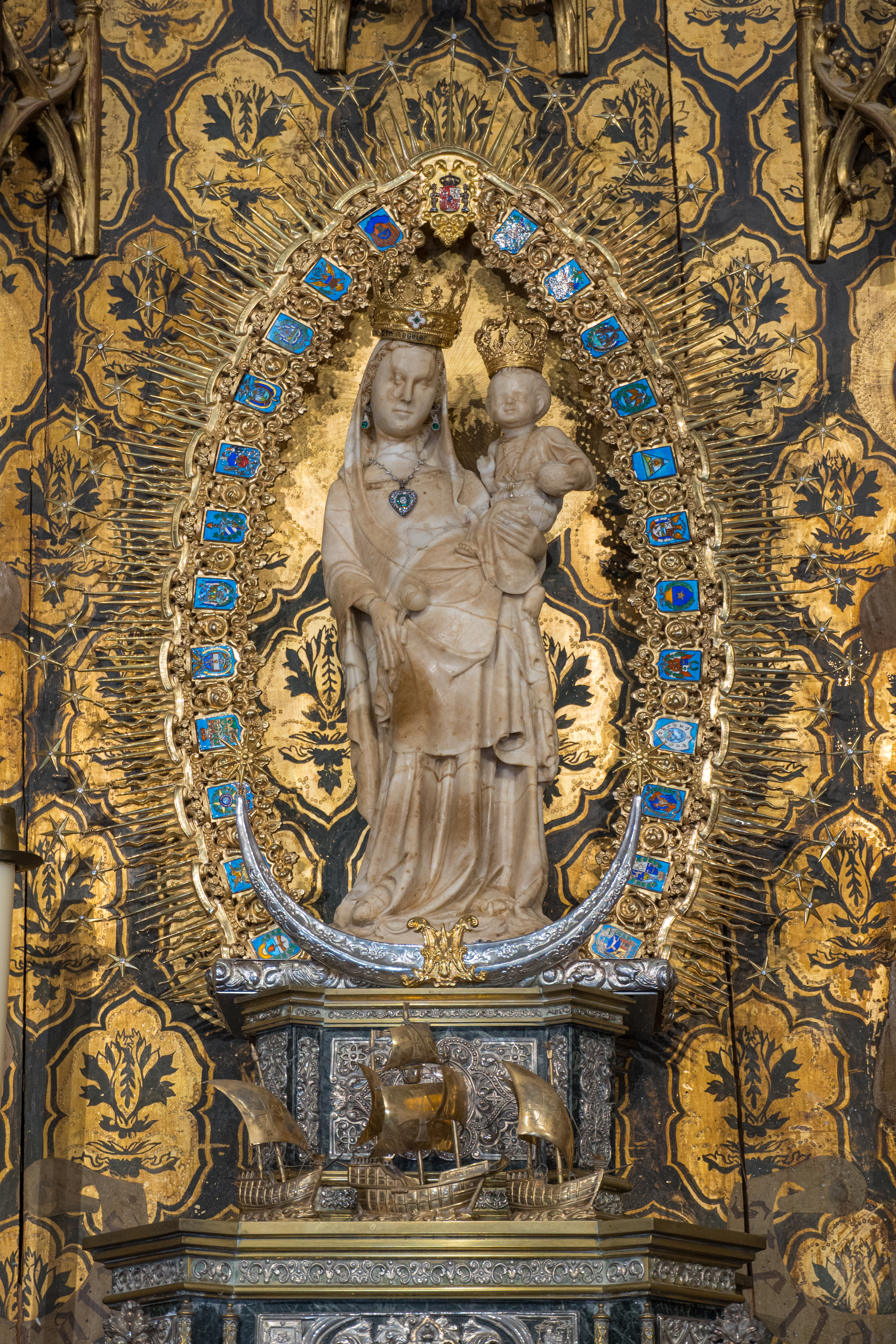
Our Lady of the Miracles

The Virgin Mary, the mother of God, is the patroness of the friary, and a small statue of her can be found in the friary church. Carved in alabaster, the statue is, stylistically, of the school of fourteenth-century Andalucian art.

According to a legend with scant historical basis, this image was brought back from one of his trips by a sailor from Palos de la Frontera and, because the Moors were still in Spain, it was hidden by submerging it off the Huelva coast. Later, fishermen hauled it up in their nets and restored it to the church of the monastery. One thing is certain: Columbus and some of his crew prayed before this image hours before setting sail for the New World.

== See also ==
- Lugares colombinos
- Costa de la Luz

== Note ==
This article is based loosely on a translation of the corresponding article from the Spanish Wikipedia.

== Sources ==
- García Gomez, José Maria. Huelva. Everest editorial, 1979. ISBN 84-241-4292-6
- Aizpún, Isabel. Huelva, Blue Guides of Spain. Gaesa editorial, 1996. ISBN 84-8023-127-0
