= Monument to the Discoverers =

- Monumento a los Descubridores
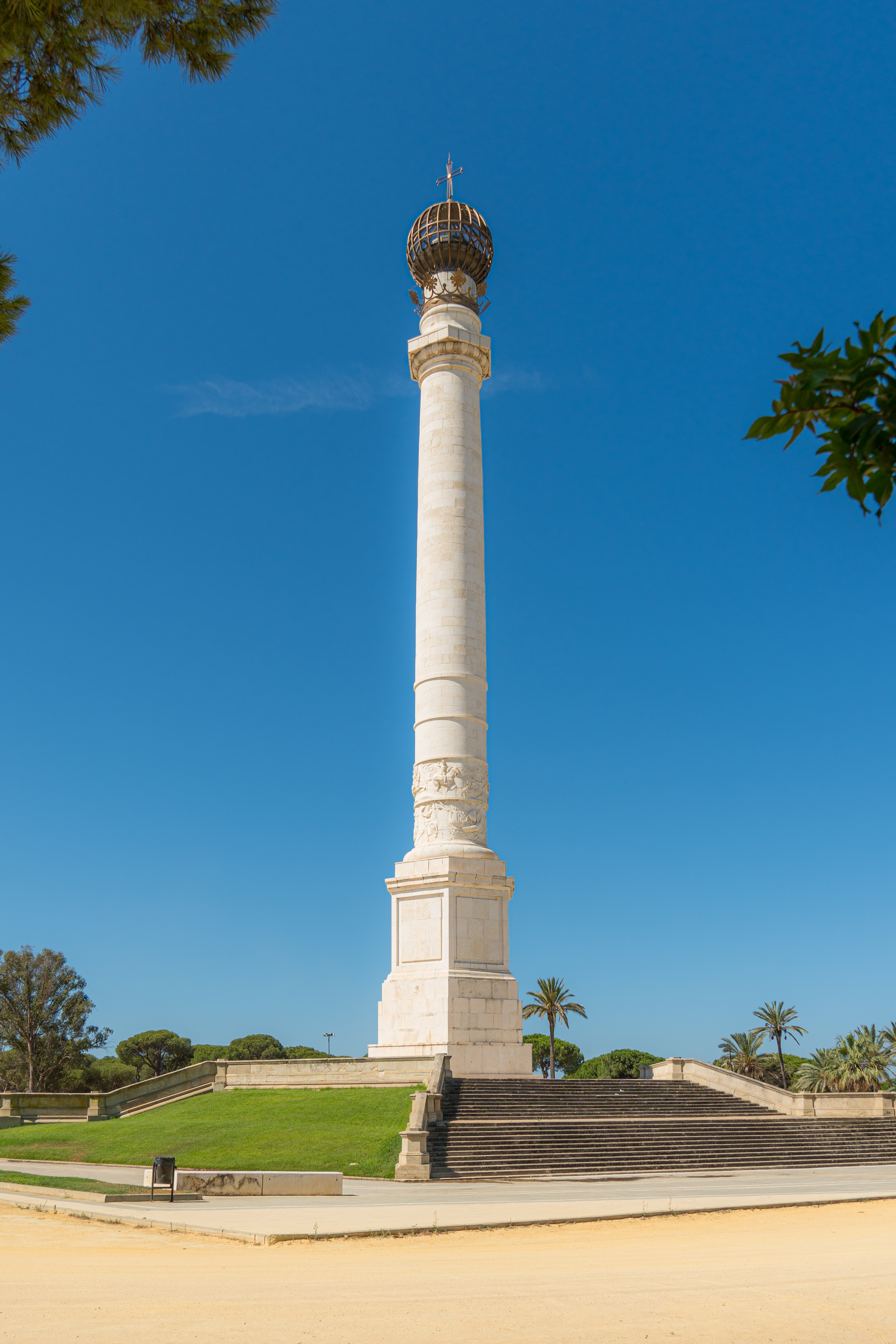
- The Column in 2024.
- 37.207688°N 6.92394°W
- Location: La Rábida, Palos de la Frontera, Spain
- Designer: Ricardo Velázquez Bosco
- Material: Limestone, concrete, steel
- Height: 54.90 m
- Opening date: 12 October 1892
- Dedicated to: The explorers of the Americas

The Monument to the Discoverers or 400th Anniversary Column (Spanish: Monumento a los descubridores or Columna del IV Centenario) is an instance of public art in Palos de la Frontera, Spain. It is dedicated to the "discoverers" of the Americas.

== History and description ==
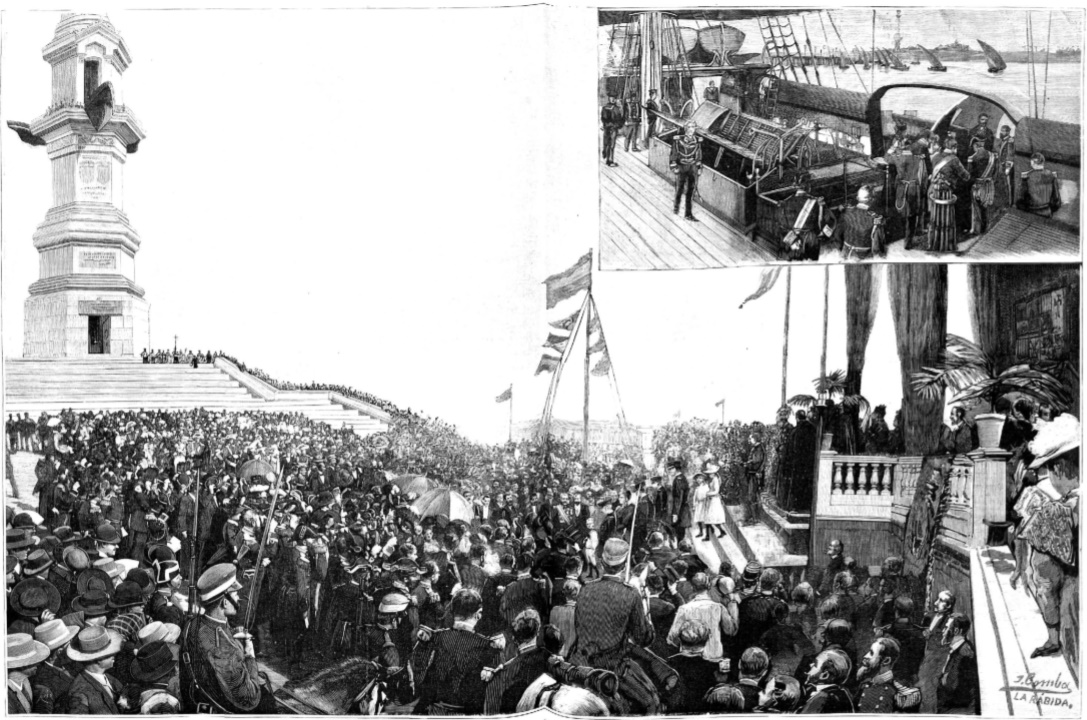
Engraving based on a sketch by Juan Comba published in La Ilustración Española y Americana depicting the inauguration of the monument.

By 1892, the Provincial Deputation of Huelva tasked Ricardo Velázquez Bosco with the erection of a monument to Columbus and the explorers of the Americas on a plot formerly owned by the House of Alba near the friary of La Rábida.

The monument was unveiled on 12 October 1892, the day marking the 400th anniversary of the arrival of Christopher Columbus to the Americas.

The original project consisted of a multi-body hexagonal pedestal, which served as the base of a column, topped by an Earth globe.

The monument underwent a restoration by Luis Martínez Feduchi from 1963 to 1967, substantially altering the original work.

By the turn of the 21st century, the monument was in a dire state of conservation. It was declared bien de interés cultural in 2008.

A new restoration, intending to consolidate the monument by installing a core of reinforced concrete, also recovering elements of the original work, such as an Earth orb or a crown, took place in the 2010s. Works finished by 2014, and the monument, standing 54,90 metre high including the recovered elements, was re-inaugurated on 31 July 2014. Three buried sculpted heads of native americans (reportedly representing the aztec, maya and taíno civilizations) part of the original monument were found out by 2011 during the disassembly of the column.
