= José Luis Albareda y Sezde =

Spanish politician and journalist

José Luis Albareda
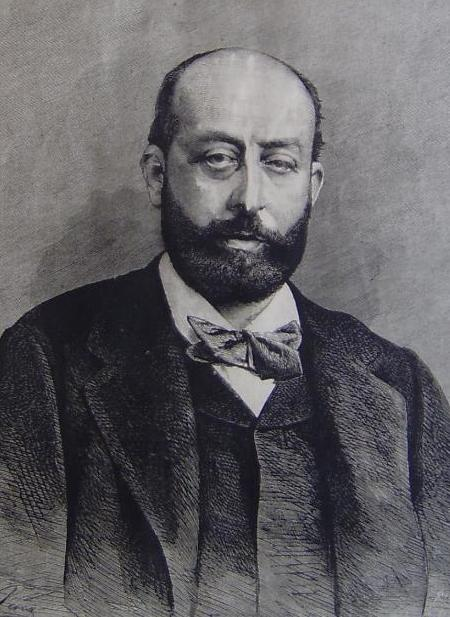
- José Luis Albareda in 1874

Minister of Development of Spain
- In office 8 February 1881 – 9 January 1883
- Monarch: Alfonso XII
- Prime Minister: Práxedes Mateo Sagasta
- Preceded by: Fermín Lasala y Collado
- Succeeded by: Germán Gamazo

Minister of Governance of Spain
- In office 12 November 1887 – 14 June 1888
- Monarch: Alfonso XIII
- Regent: Maria Christina of Austria
- Prime Minister: Práxedes Mateo Sagasta
- Preceded by: Fernando León y Castillo
- Succeeded by: Segismundo Moret

Personal details
- Born: José Luis Albareda y Sezde; 30 June 1828 El Puerto de Santa María, Spain
- Died: 3 November 1897 (aged 69) Madrid, Spain
- Resting place: Saint Isidore Cemetery
- Party: Liberal Party

José Luis Albareda y Sezde (1828, El Puerto de Santa María – November 3, 1897) was a Spanish politician and journalist. He was Minister of Public Works during the reign of Alfonso XII and Minister of the Interior during the regency of Maria Cristina of Austria. As minister of public works, he instigated the National Exhibition of Mining, held in 1883.

== Politics ==
A member of the Partido Liberal he became a deputy of Cadiz Province in the elections celebrated between 1863 and 1865. Later, he was elected in Alicante between 1869 and 1876. He went on to serve in Seville (province) between 1879 and 1884. In 1887 he was chosen as a senator representing Seville, and in 1891 representing Palencia (province). In 1893 he was named life senator. Between February 8 of 1881 and January 9 of 1883 he was Minister of Public Works under Sagasta, later serving as Minister of Interior between November 12, 1887 and the June 14, 1888.

== Literature ==
He was also a newspaper founder and director of numerous political papers, expressing deep-rooted support for the political liberalization of Spain. He was also civil governor of Madrid (1871) and ambassador of Spain in Paris and London.
