= Pantheon of the Duchess of Sevillano =

Building in Guadalajara Province, Spain

- Panteón de la Duquesa de Sevillano
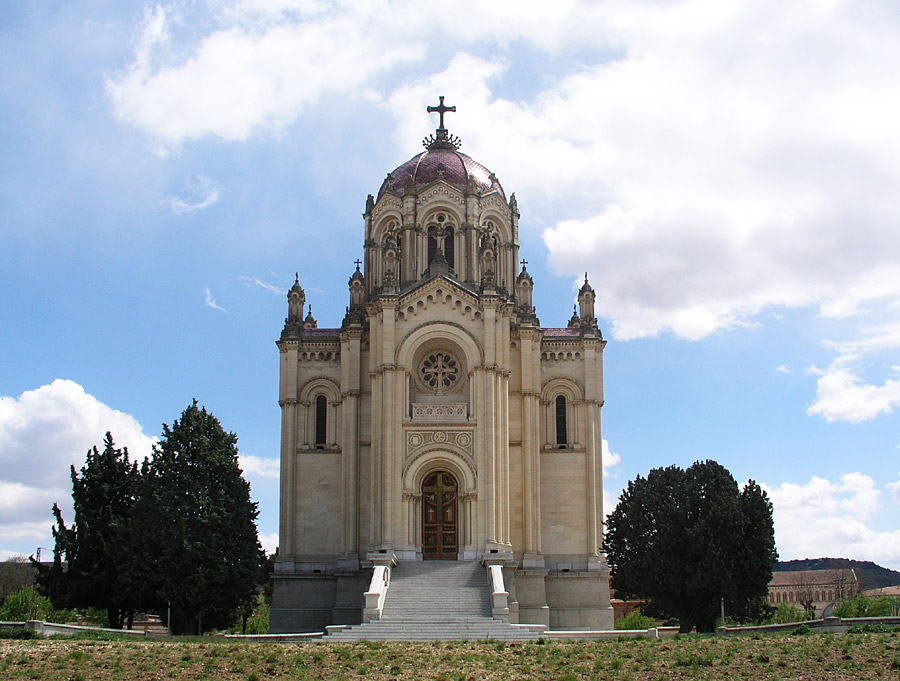
- Interactive map of the Pantheon of the Duchess of Sevillano area

General information
- Type: Mausoleum
- Architectural style: Eclectic
- Location: Guadalajara, Spain
- Coordinates: 40.627696°N 3.156065°W
- Construction started: 1887
- Completed: 1916

Design and construction
- Architect: Ricardo Velázquez Bosco

The Pantheon of the Duchess of Sevillano (Spanish: Panteón de la Duquesa de Sevillano or Spanish: Panteón de la Condesa de la Vega del Pozo) is an instance of funerary architecture built in eclectic style in Guadalajara, Spain.

== Description ==
After being granted authorisation in June 1887, María Diega Desmaissières y Sevillano (1852–1916), Countess of Vega del Pozo, commissioned the project for the construction of a mausoleum for herself to Ricardo Velázquez Bosco. The Countess was locally known in Guadalajara rather as duquesa de Sevillano ("Duchess of Sevillano"), after another of her nobiliary titles. She inherited a large fortune, and devoted an important part of it to cultural patronage.

The building has a floor plan shaped like a greek cross, and it is built in stone from Novelda. The iconic dome is covered with purple tiles. The interior of the building displays works by Alejandro Ferrant (a painting on the high altar) and bronze and marble sculptures by Ángel García Díaz, including the four angels flanking the sarcophagus in the pantheon's crypt. The design of the vault inspired a number of works by Velázquez Bosco's disciple Antonio Palacios.

The buildings works ended in 1916, the year in which the Countess died.
