= Alberto Palacio =

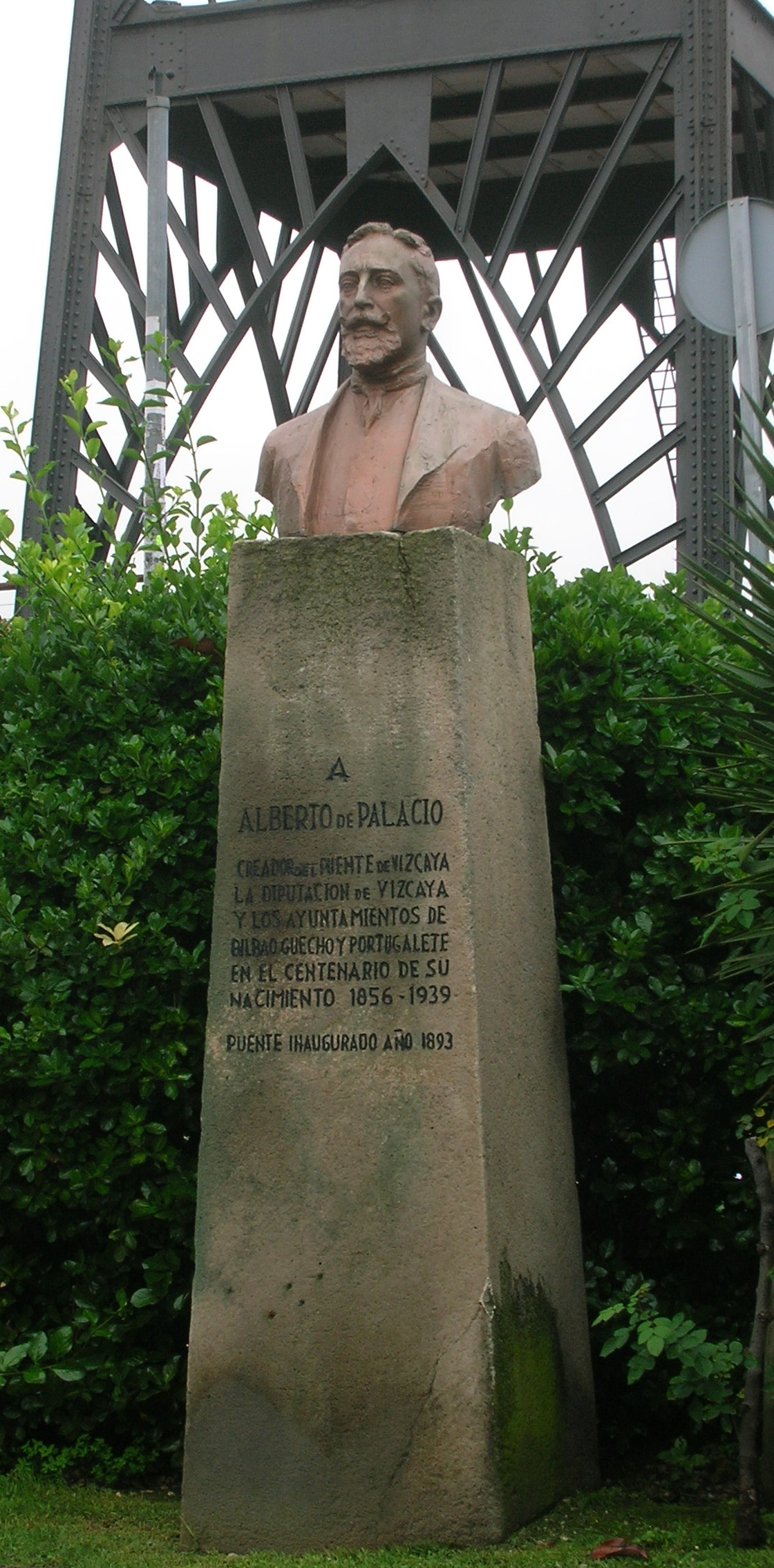
Monument to Palacio in front of his Transporter Bridge

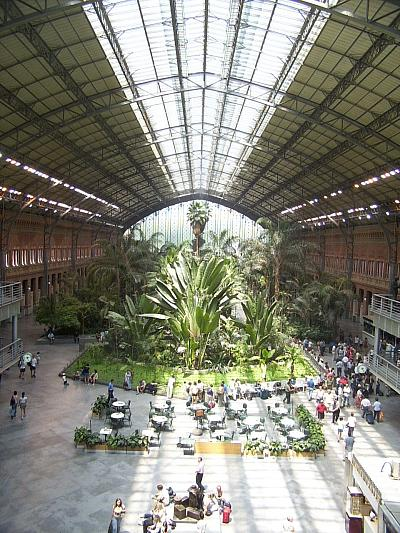
Atocha station, Madrid

Alberto de Palacio y Elissague (1856–1939) was a Spanish engineer and architect born in Sare (Northern Basque Country) and grown up in Gordexola. He studied architecture in Barcelona and completed his education in Paris, studying mathematics, engineering, astronomy and medicine. He was also a student & disciple of Gustave Eiffel.

== Works ==
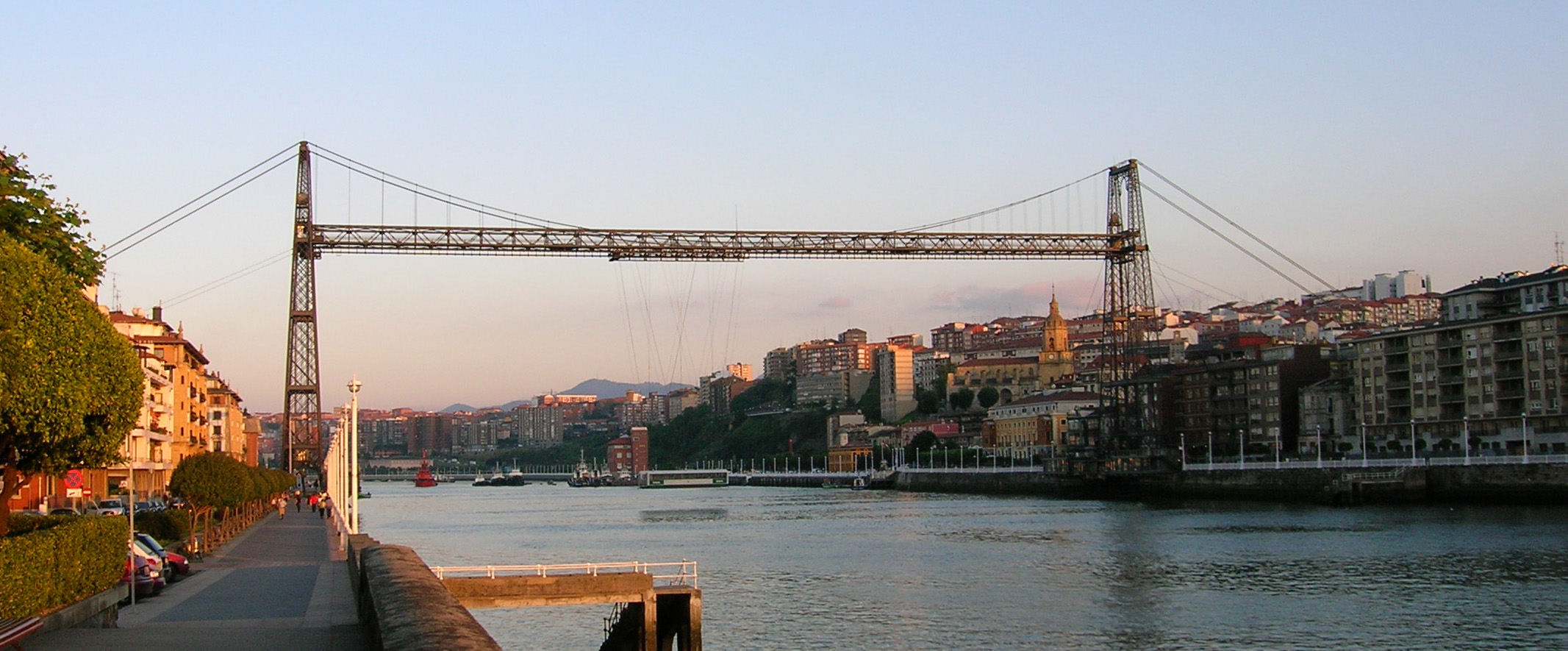
Bridge of Biscay, the first transporter bridge

Between 1890 and 1893, he worked, together with his brother Silvestre de Palacio (engineer), on his most important project, the transporter bridge ("Puente Colgante") on the Nervion river, between Portugalete and Getxo (Biscay), for which he gained international recognition. It was the first bridge of this kind ever built.

All his work is characterized for the search of the functionality and the innovation, where iron and glass play a noticeable role. He passed long seasons of work in Madrid where he:

- Participated in the construction of the Palacio de Velázquez in the Retiro Park, together with architect Ricardo Velázquez Bosco, coordinator of the project, and the ceramicist Daniel Zuloaga (1881 and 1883).
- Participated in the construction of the Crystal Palace (inspired by the London one) in the same park, again with architect Ricardo Velázquez Bosco, coordinator of the project, and ceramicist Daniel Zuloaga (1887).
- Designed and built the new Madrid Atocha railway station, in collaboration with the engineer Saint-James (1889–1892).
- Built the Osram factory (1914–1916).
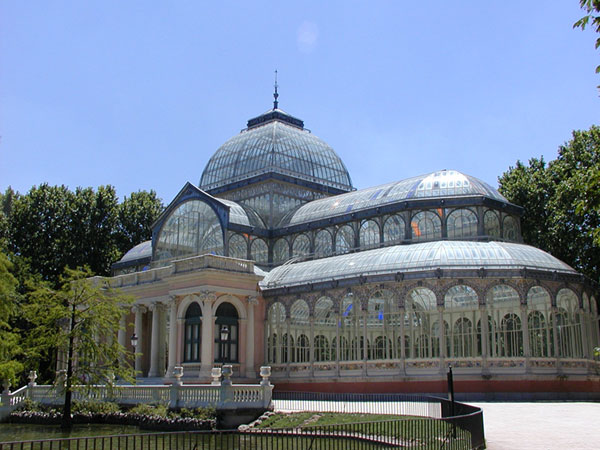
The Crystal Palace at Retiro.

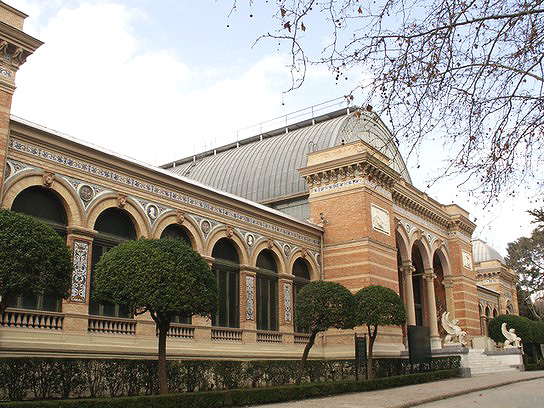
Palace of Velázquez at Retiro.

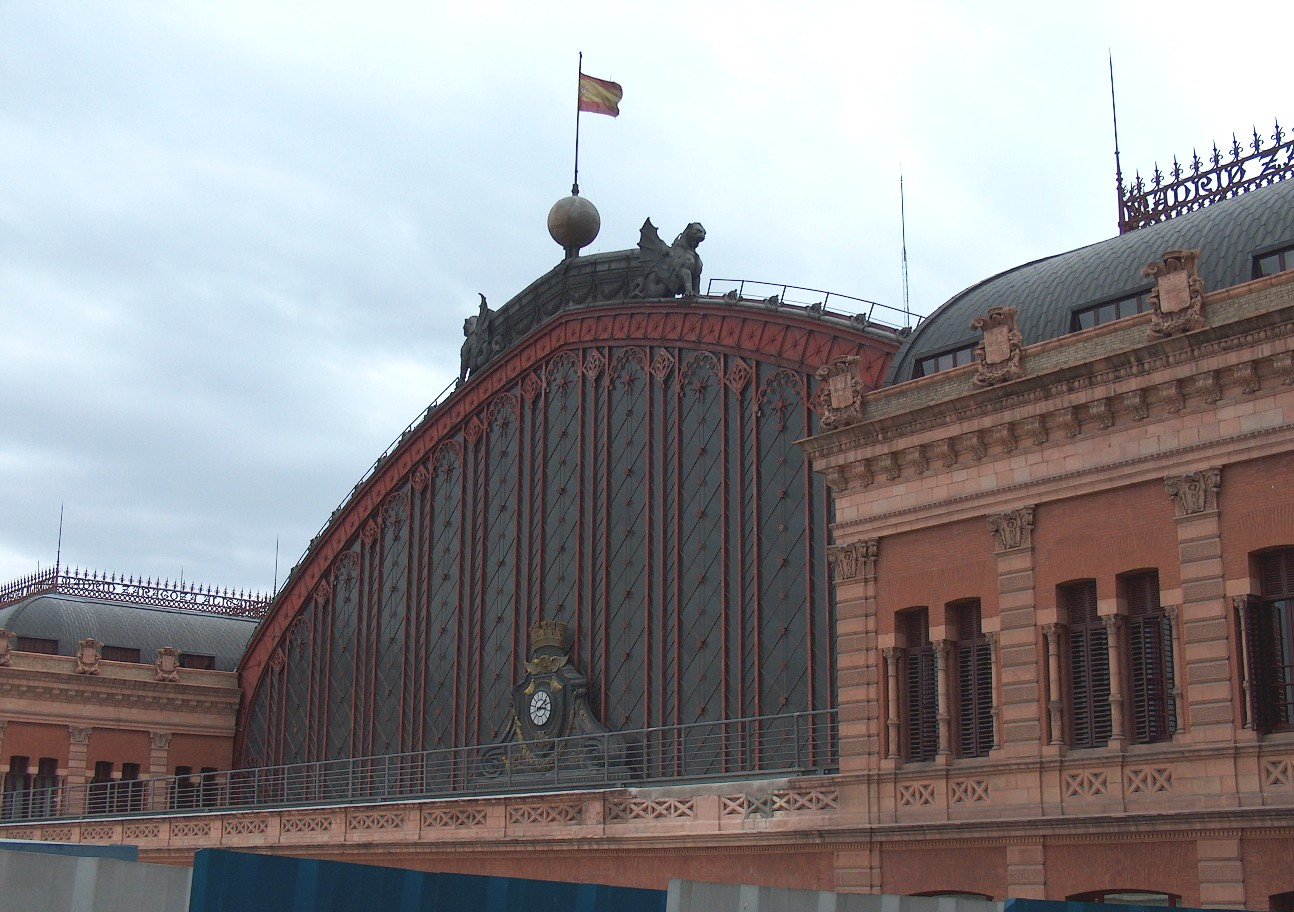
Atocha Station.
