= Palacio de Fomento =

Palace of Fomento
- Palacio de Fomento (Spanish)
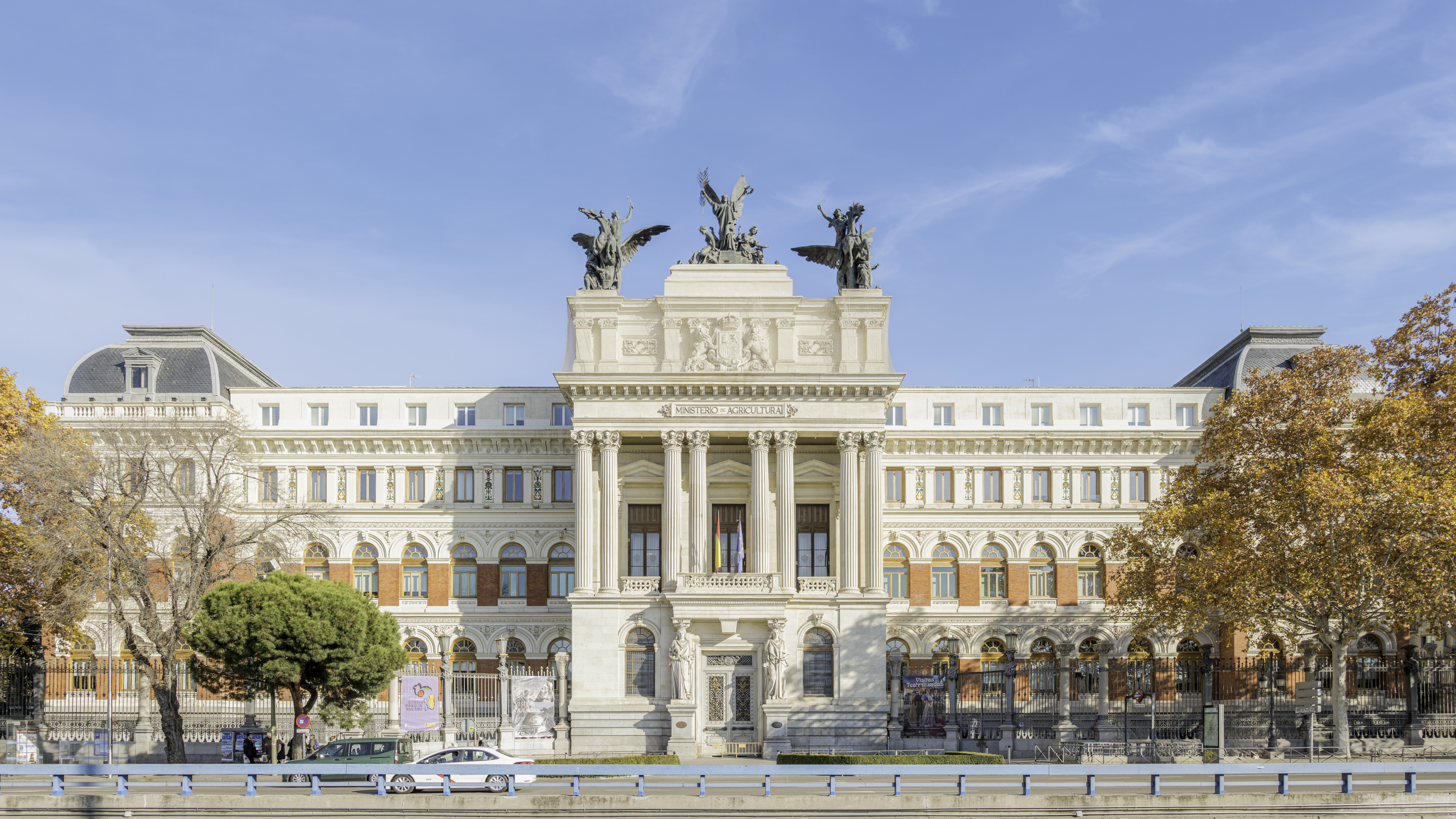

- Location within Spain
- 40°24′32″N 03°41′25″W
- Location: Madrid, Spain

Spanish Cultural Heritage
- Official name: Ministerio de Agricultura, Pesca y Alimentación
- Type: Non-movable
- Criteria: Monument
- Designated: 1989
- Reference no.: RI-51-0006916

The Palace of Fomento (Spanish: Palacio de Fomento), also known as the Ministry of Agriculture Building, is a nineteenth-century office building in Madrid, Spain. Designed by Ricardo Velázquez Bosco, and built between 1893 and 1897, it is on a prominent site opposite Atocha railway station.

== Use and name ==
The building's name has changed over the years reflecting the official name of the Ministry which occupies it. It was originally occupied by the Ministry of Development (Spanish: Ministerio de Fomento). For most of its life the building has been the seat of the Ministry of Agriculture, and the words "Ministerio de Agricultura" are prominently displayed in a cartouche on the facade.

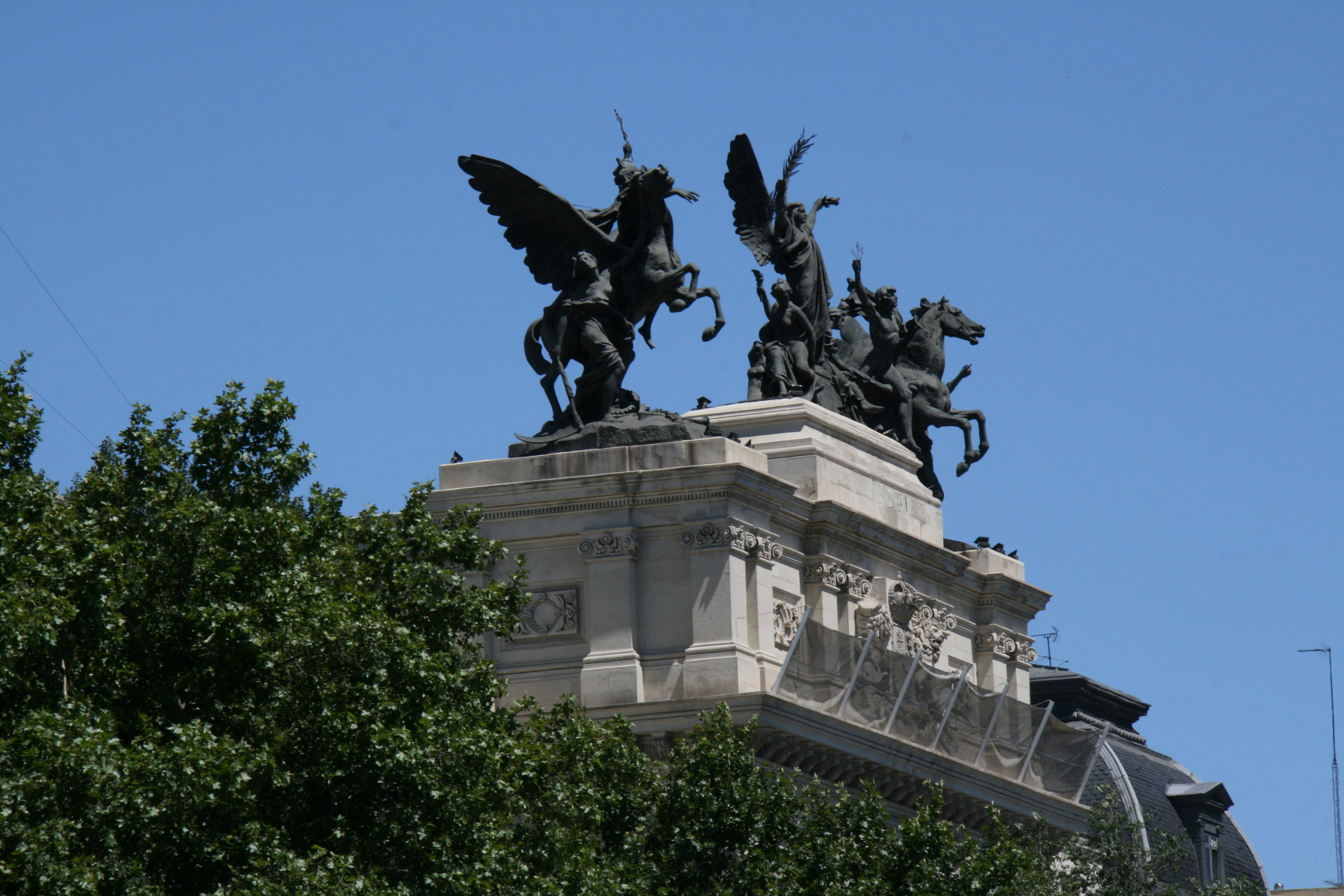
Sculptures by Agustí Querol Subirats adorning the building

== Sculptures ==
In 1905, a group of marble sculptures by Agustí Querol Subirats entitled La Gloria y los Pegasos was placed on top of the building. The damage suffered during the Civil War and the inclement weather suffered over time deteriorated the sculptures, which were replaced by bronze replicas in 1976.

== Heritage status and access ==
It was put on Spain's national heritage register in 1989 under the name Ministerio de Agricultura, Pesca y Alimentación (Ministry of Agriculture, Fisheries and Food). It is classed as a Bien de Interés Cultural or Property of Cultural Interest.

As at 2016 guided tours are available to the public outside normal office hours.
