= Palacio de Velázquez =

Coordinates: 40°24′54.68″N 3°40′55.16″W

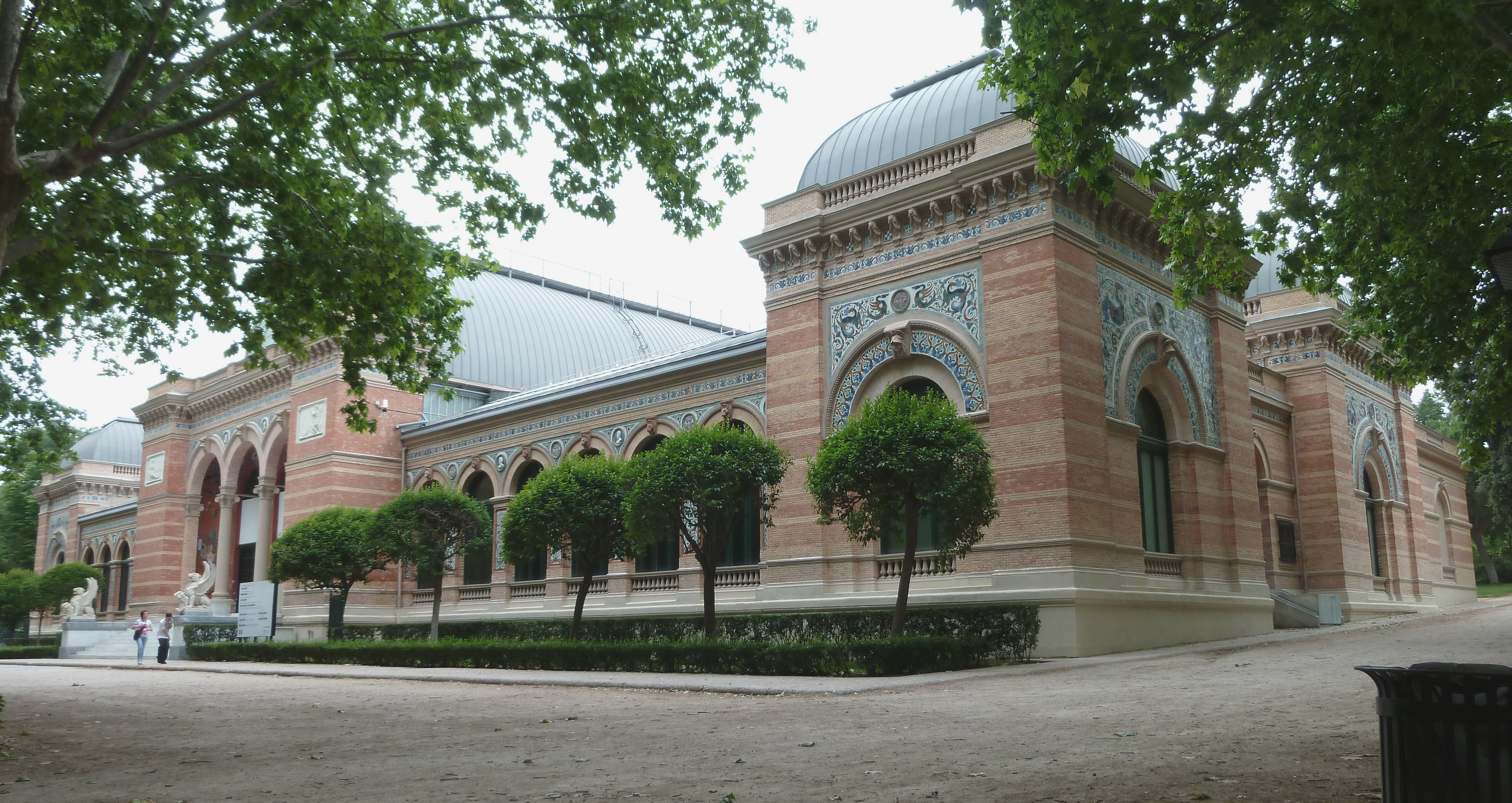
Palacio de Velázquez

Palacio de Velázquez, or Velázquez Palace (sometimes referred to as Palacio de Exposiciones) is an exhibition hall located in Buen Retiro Park, Madrid, Spain.

Originally known as the Palacio de la Minería, it was built in 1881-3 for the Exposición Nacional de Minería by architect Ricardo Velázquez Bosco (and named after him), engineer Alberto Palacio, and ceramist Daniel Zuloaga. It functions as an arts and crafts gallery and is listed as a Bien de Interés Cultural. The building's interior is viewable on Google Street View and it is part of the Google Art Project.

== Geography ==
Palacio de Velázquez is located in the Parque del Buen Retiro in Madrid's Jeronimos district. It occupies a central position in the park, between the large boating lake and the small lake next to the Palacio de Cristal. The Buen Retiro ("nice retreat") was originally a royal hunting ground converted into an exclusive royal park for Felipe IV's Buen Retiro Palace, which spread over 300 acres (120 ha). The palace was largely demolished after the Peninsular War, with only Casón del Buen Retiro (a ballroom) and Salón de Reinos (used as a throne room) still existing, and the park has been open to public since 1868.

== Architecture ==
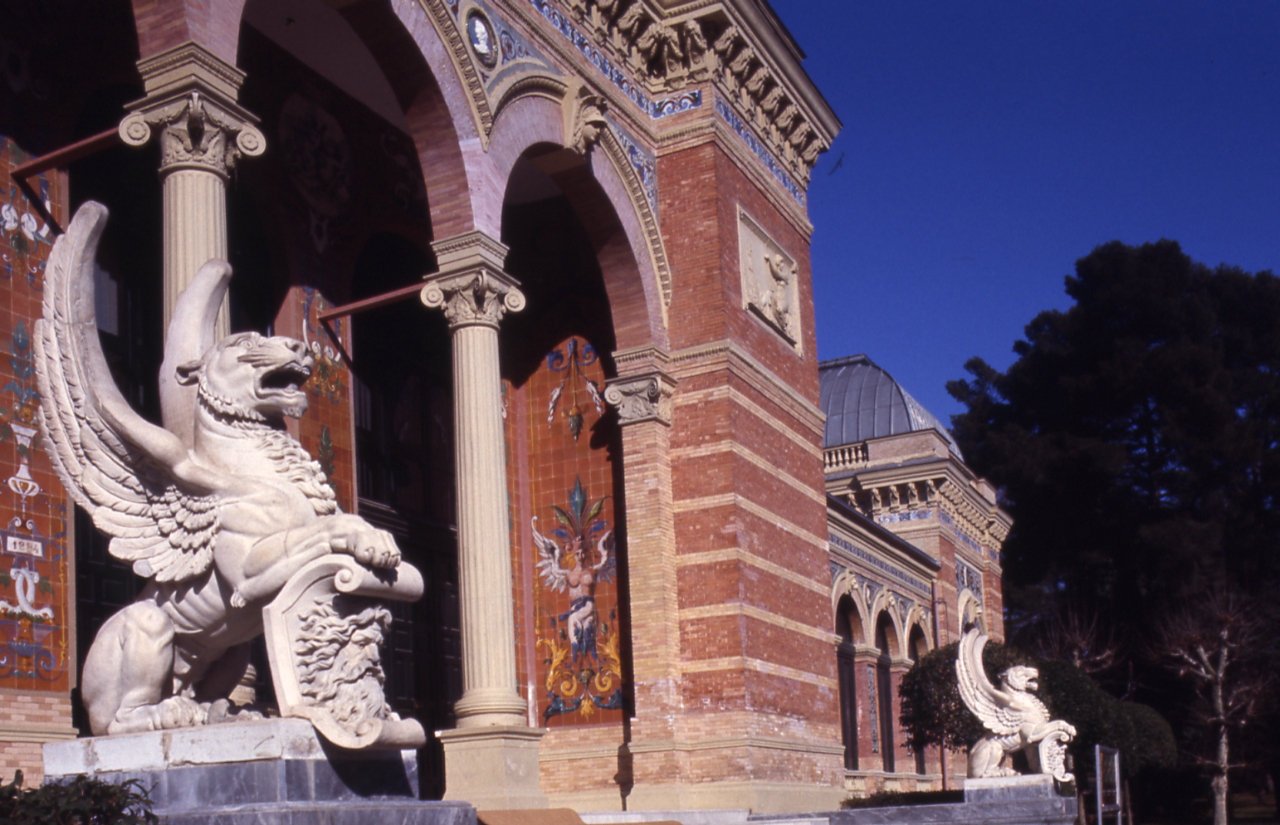
Main entrance of the Palacio de Velázquez. Photo by Paolo Monti.

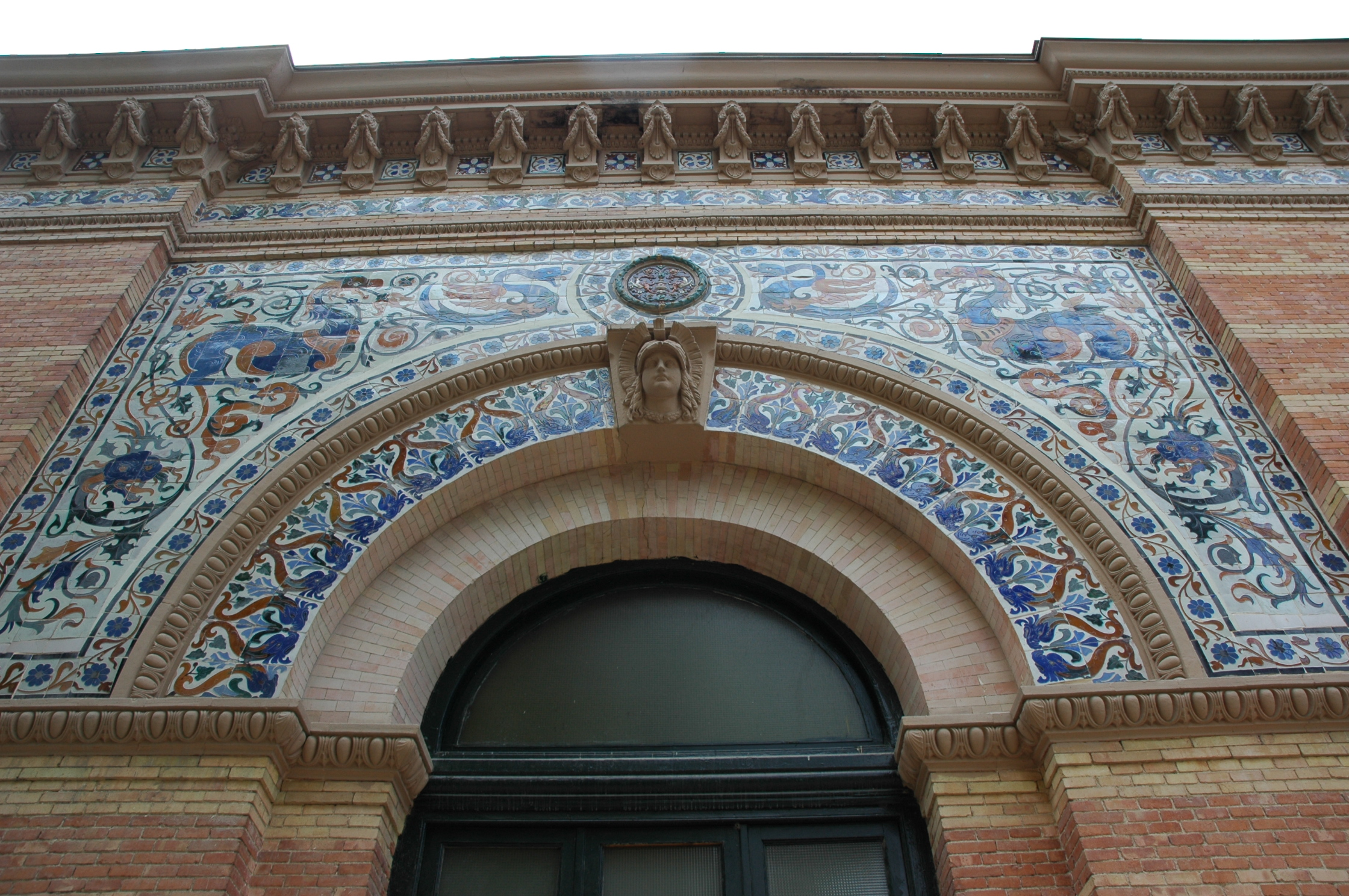
Arch decorated with coloured tiles

It is a large neoclassical, red-brick-and-tile building covered with iron vaults and glass to naturally illuminate the rooms. It was built between 1881 and 1883, for the National Exhibition to display the achievements in the field of mining, metallurgy, ceramics, glass-making and mineral water industries. The architect was Ricardo Velázquez. The engineer Alberto Palacio, and the ceramist Daniel Zuloaga also worked on the project.

With dimensions of 73.80 by 28.75 metres (242.1 ft × 94.3 ft), it is one of the architect's most monumental buildings, although not as large as the Ministerio de Agricultura, Pesca y Alimentación. It was built in two-toned brick and tiles by the Royal Factory of La Moncloa.

The Palacio de Velázquez is the only surviving building of a number of pavilions erected for the mining exhibition. However, roughly 150 metres (490 ft) southwest there is a smaller building by Ricardo Velázquez, the Palacio de Cristal. The Palacio de Cristal was designed for the Philippine Exposition of 1887 which was also held in the Retiro Park. It served as a greenhouse for an exhibition of tropical plants from the Philippines. In terms of its original function, it is comparable to the greenhouses of Kew Gardens, but it is usually described as being influenced by another of London's buildings, The Crystal Palace built for the Great Exhibition of 1851. The Crystal Palace also influenced the Palacio de Velázquez, particularly in its use of iron and glass to allow natural light to brighten the rooms.

== Exhibitions ==
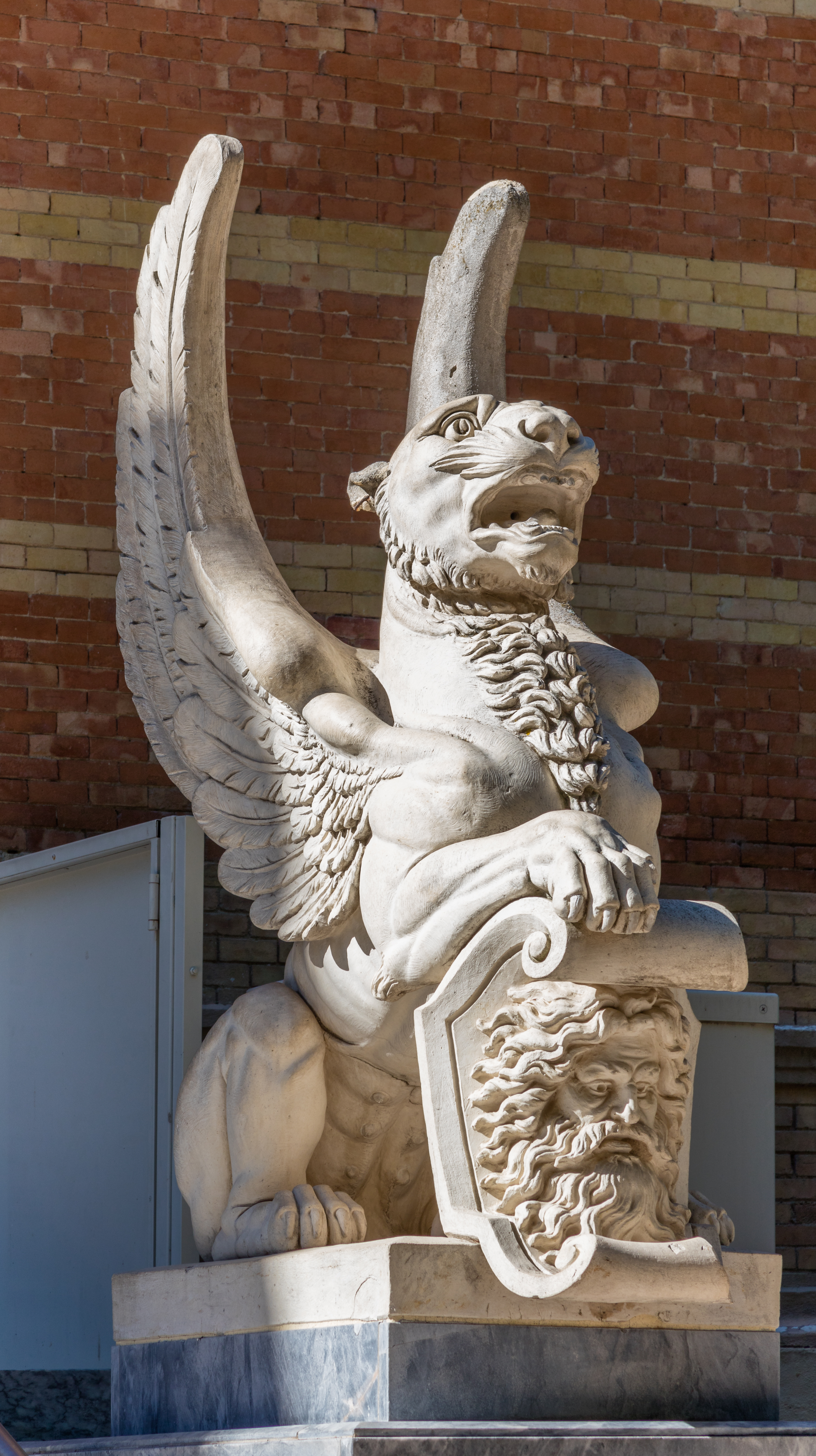
Detail of one of the winged lions at the entrance.

After the Philippine Exhibition of 1887, the Spanish government allocated the Palacio de Velázquez for use as a museum of Spain's overseas territories. Since 1908, it has hosted the National Fine Arts exhibitions. The works of contemporary painters are often exhibited at the Palacio; since 1987, artists such as Cindy Sherman, Nan Goldin, Juan Muñoz and José Manuel Broto have showcased here. The Palacio closed in 2005 for restoration and conservation, re-opening in 2010 with an exhibition dedicated to the Catalan multidisciplinary artist, Antoni Miralda. The Palacio is currently operated by the Ministry of Culture, and is dedicated to temporary exhibitions of Spain's national museum of modern art, the Museo Nacional Centro de Arte Reina Sofía.
