= Germán Gamazo =

Spanish politician and lawyer (1840–1901)

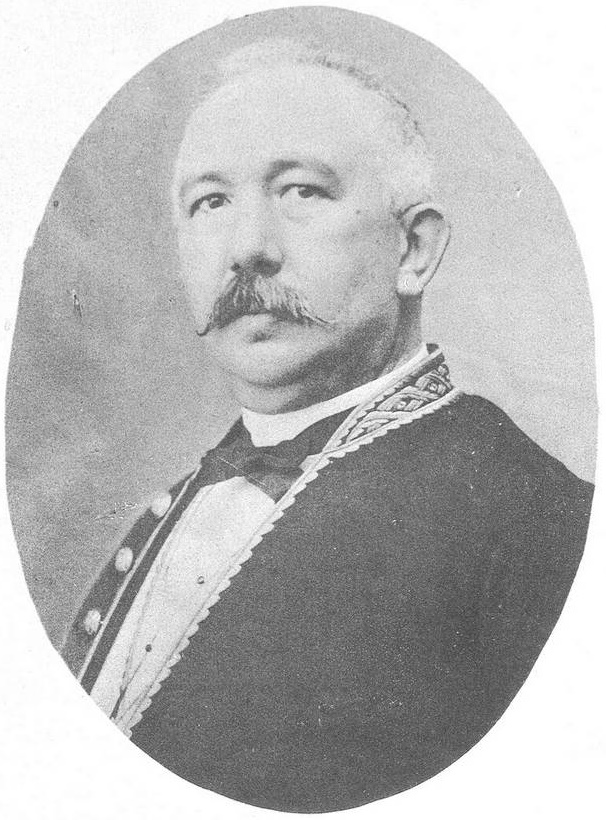

Minister of Development of Spain
- In office May 18, 1898 – October 22, 1898
- Monarch: Alfonso XIII
- Regent: Maria Christina of Austria
- Prime Minister: Práxedes Mateo Sagasta
- Preceded by: José Álvarez de Toledo y Acuña
- Succeeded by: Vicente Romero Girón
- In office January 9, 1883 – October 13, 1883
- Monarch: Alfonso XII
- Prime Minister: Práxedes Mateo Sagasta
- Preceded by: José Luis Albareda y Sezde
- Succeeded by: Ángel Carvajal y Fernández de Córdoba

Minister of Finance of Spain
- In office December 11, 1892 – March 12, 1894
- Monarch: Alfonso XIII
- Regent: Maria Christina of Austria
- Prime Minister: Praxedes Mateo Sagasta
- Preceded by: Juan de la Concha Castañeda
- Succeeded by: Amós Salvador Rodrigáñez

Minister of Overseas of Spain
- In office November 27, 1885 – October 10, 1886
- Monarch: Alfonso XIII
- Regent: Maria Christina of Austria
- Prime Minister: Praxedes Mateo Sagasta
- Preceded by: Manuel Aguirre de Tejada
- Succeeded by: Víctor Balaguer i Cirera

Personal details
- Born: Germán Gamazo y Calvo; May 28, 1840 Boecillo, Kingdom of Spain
- Died: November 22, 1901 (aged 61) Madrid, Kingdom of Spain
- Relatives: Gabriel Maura (nephew); Miguel Maura (nephew); Antonio Maura (brother-in-law)
- Occupation: Politician; lawyer

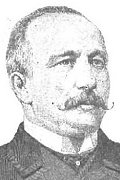
Gamazo in 1898

Germán Gamazo y Calvo (28 May 1840 – 22 November 1901) was a Spanish politician and lawyer who was a minister several times in the 1880s and the 1890s.
