= Palacio de Cristal del Retiro =

Glass building in Madrid, Spain

Coordinates: 40°24′48.8″N 3°40′55.4″W

Palacio de Cristal
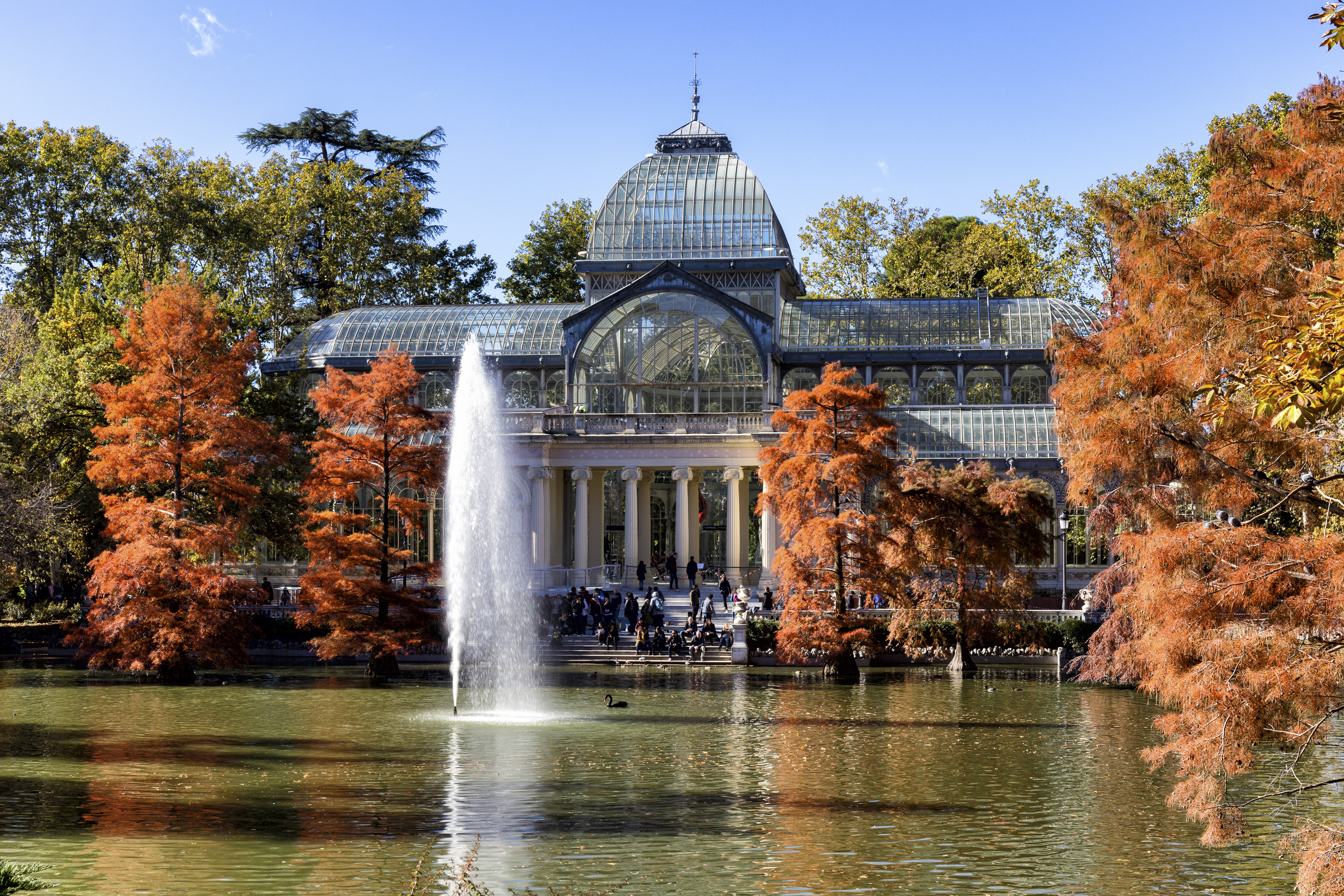

General information
- Type: Conservatory
- Location: Madrid, Spain
- Current tenants: Museo Nacional Centro de Arte Reina Sofía

UNESCO World Heritage Site
- Part of: Paseo del Prado and Buen Retiro, a landscape of Arts and Sciences
- Criteria: Cultural: (ii), (iv), (vi)
- Reference: 1618
- Inscription: 2021 (44th Session)

Spanish Cultural Heritage
- Type: Non-movable
- Criteria: Historic Garden
- Designated: 8 February 1935
- Reference no.: RI-52-0000015-00001

The Palacio de Cristal ("Glass Palace") is a 19th-century conservatory located in the Buen Retiro Park in Madrid, Spain. It is currently used for art exhibitions.

The Palacio de Cristal, in the shape of a Greek cross, is made almost entirely of glass set in an iron framework on a brick base, which is decorated with ceramics. Its cupola makes the structure over 22 metres high. When it was erected, glass and iron construction on a large scale was already to be seen in Madrid at Delicias station (1880), the work of a French architect; however, the curved architecture of the Palacio de Cristal is more comparable to the techniques pioneered in England by Decimus Burton and Joseph Paxton (the designer of London's Crystal Palace).

The cast-iron frame was manufactured in Bilbao. The structure was designed in a way that would allow it to be re-erected on another site (as happened to the Crystal Palace in London). However, the building has remained on the original site, next to a lake.

The Palacio de Cristal was, alongside the Pabellón Central, one of the main venues of the 1887 Philippines Exposition. It housed live plants brought from the Philippines.

== Use ==
The building has retained its original appearance. However, it is no longer used as a greenhouse, and is currently used for art exhibits. The Crystal Palace belongs to the Reina Sofía Museum, and is one of its temporary exposition centres together with Velázquez Palace.

== Gallery ==
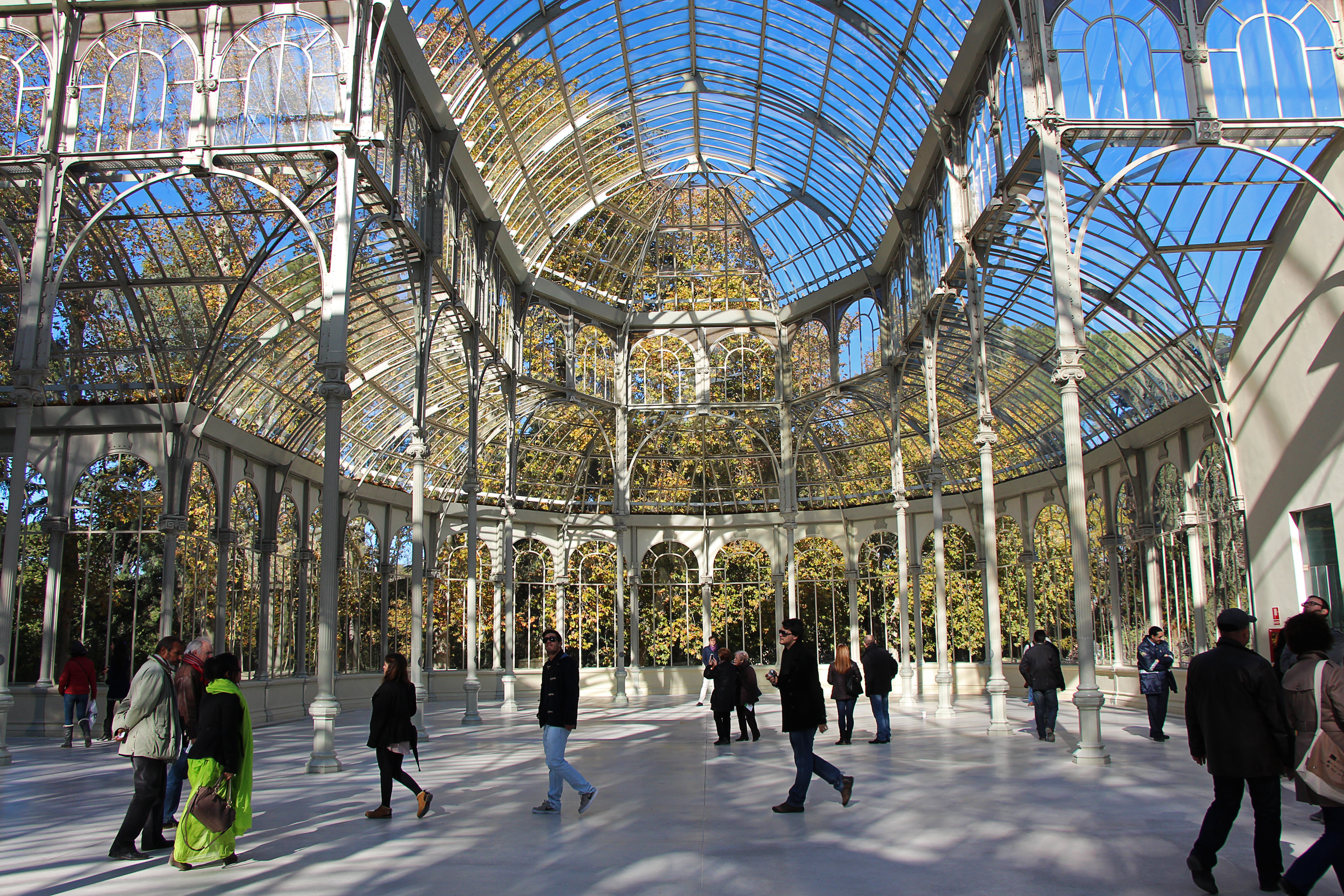
Interior

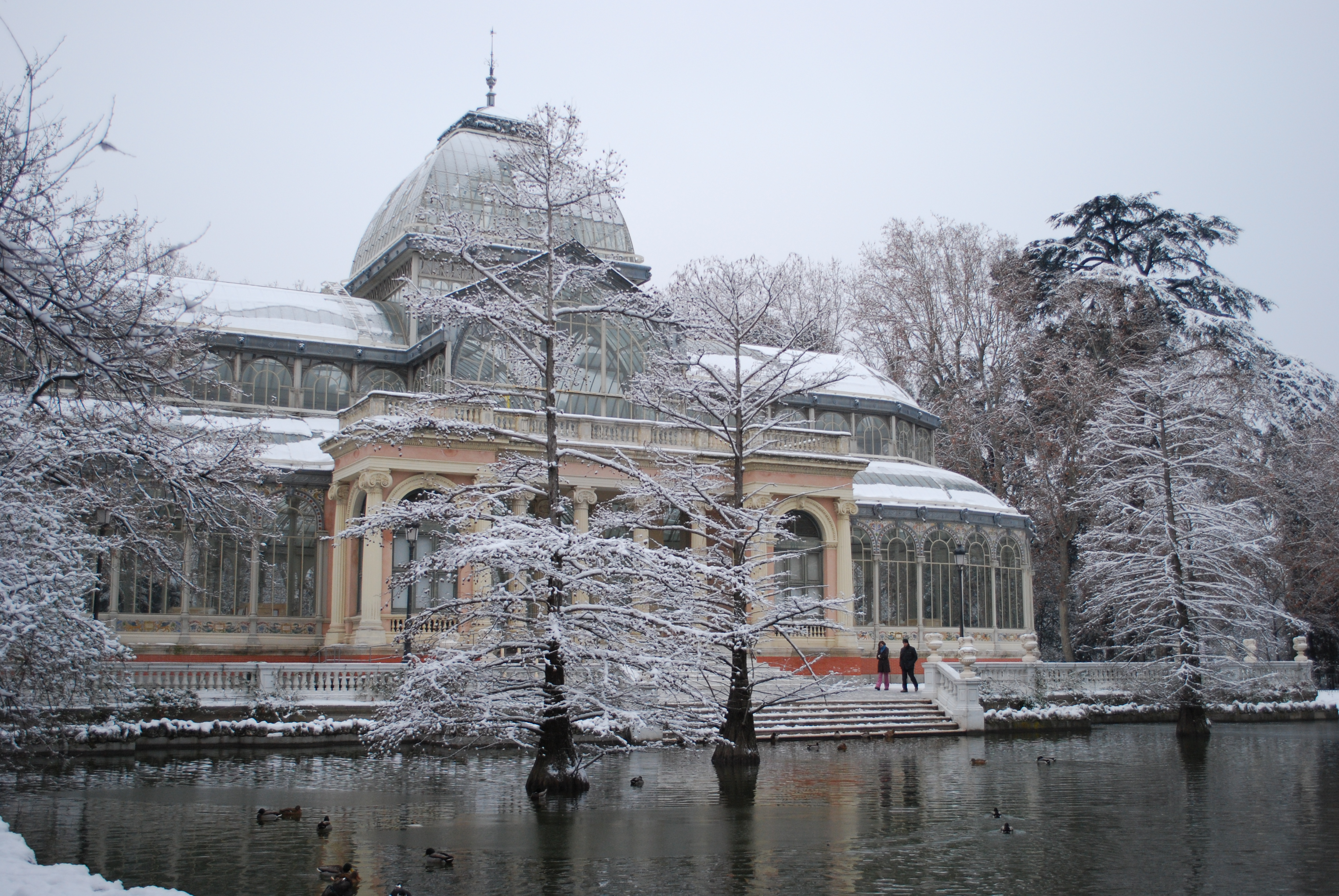
Snowy sight, in 2009

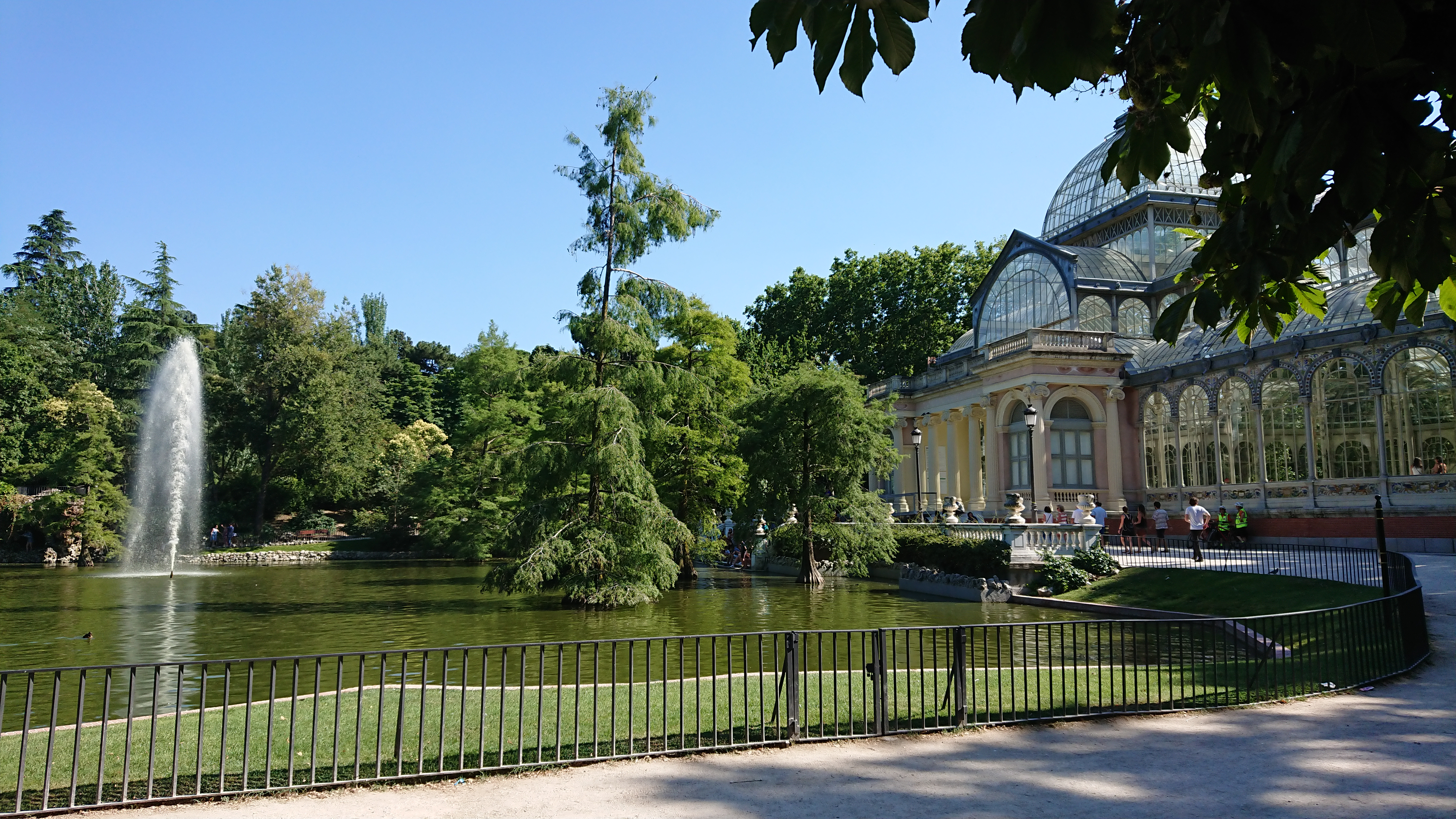
Pond

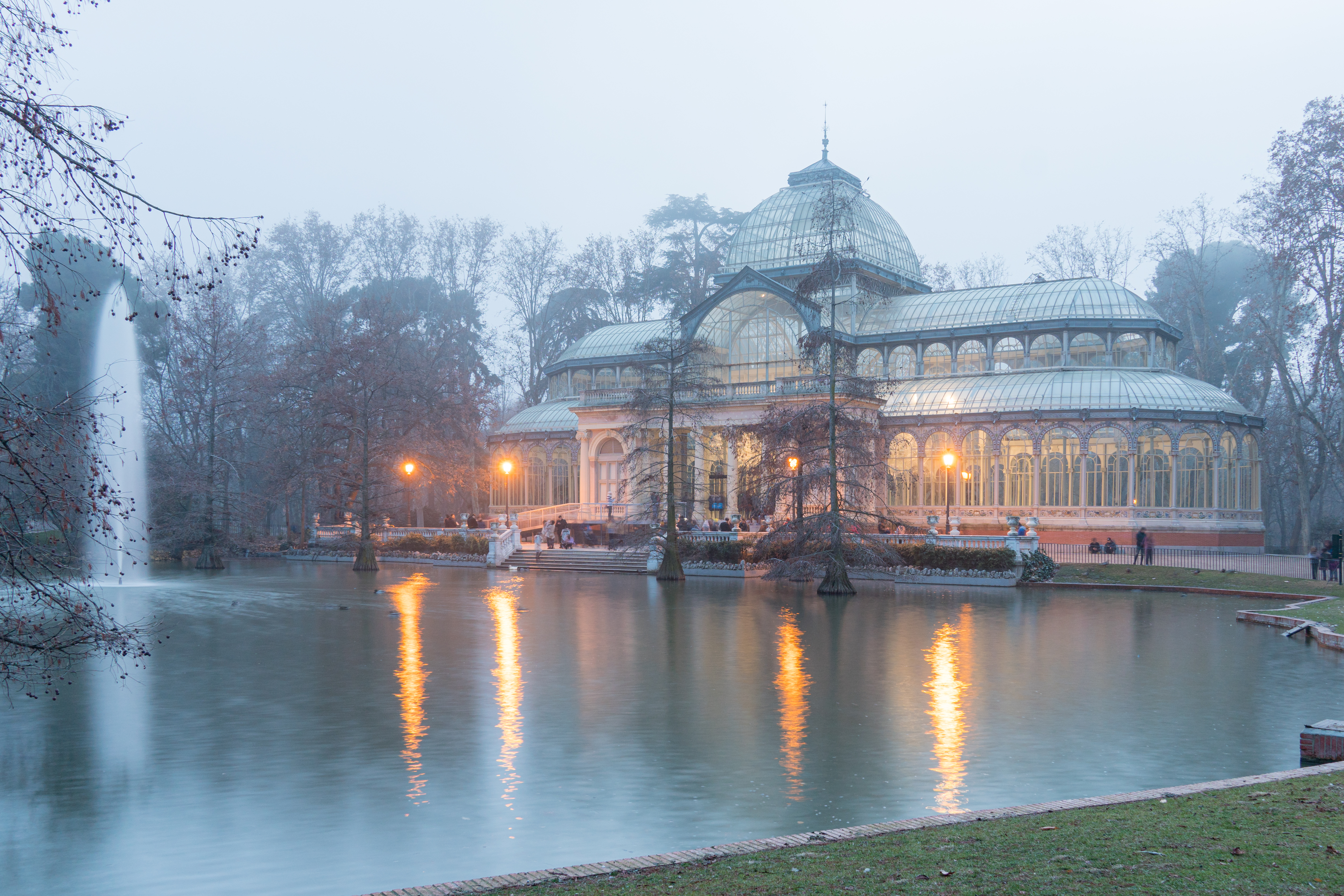
Foggy winter evening
