= Sebastián Vidal y Soler =

Spanish botanist

Sebastián Vidal
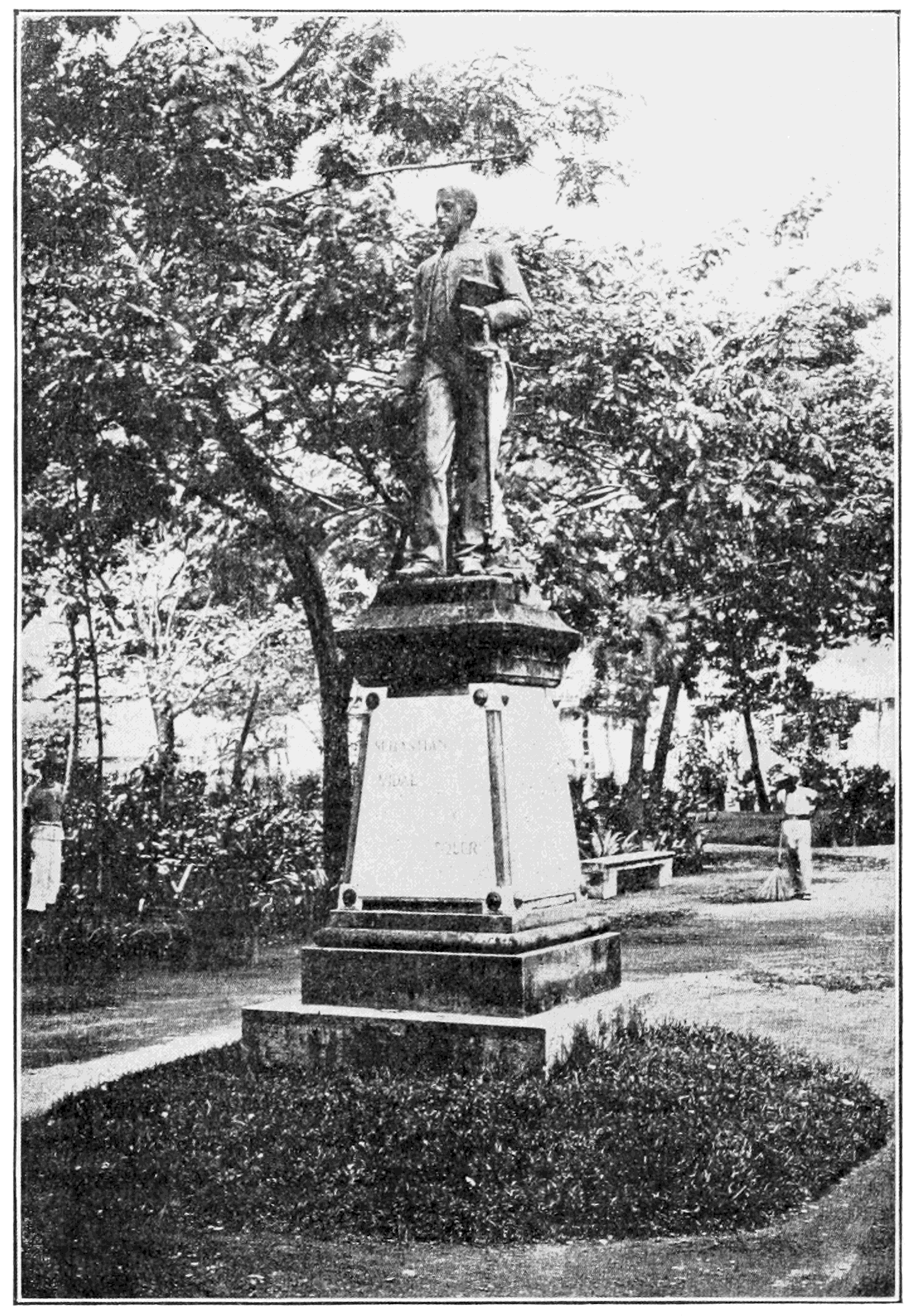
- Statue of Vidal in Manila
- Born: 1 April 1842; Barcelona, Spain
- Died: 28 July 1889 (aged 47); Manila, Captaincy General of the Philippines
- Scientific career
- Fields: Botany, Forestry
- Academic advisors: Máximo Laguna
- Author abbrev. (botany): S.Vidal

Sebastián Vidal y Soler (Barcelona, April 1, 1842 – Manila, July 28, 1889) was a Spanish forester and botanist.

Sebastián was born in Barcelona to Domènec Vidal i Balaguer and Peronella Soler i Rovirosa. He and his lesser-known older brother, Domingo, studied at the Spanish forestry school. Sebastián also studied in Germany at the Royal Saxon Academy of Forestry after which he returned to the Spanish forestry school to teach botany.

== Career in the Philippines ==
In the 1860s Spain had set up a forestry service in the Philippines and in the 1870s Sebastián and his brother applied to work there. As a forester, Sebastián had a particular interest in woody plants, but he studied Malesian flora in general, collecting specimens, collaborating with other botanists, and publishing a number of works including Revisión de Plantas Vasculares Filipinas (Manila 1886).

He was able to make several trips back to Europe and also visited the USA. His 1874 publication Memoria sobre el ramo de montes en las islas Filipinas refers to his being in Spain, apparently for health reasons. In 1876 he attended the Centennial Exposition in Philadelphia in order to promote the products of the Philippines. In 1883 he took sick leave because of asthma and visited European herbaria including that of Kew. In 1887 a Philippines Exposition was organised in Madrid. There was a section devoted to Geografía botánica del Archipiélago, su flora, la forestal y fauna ('Botanical geography of the Archipelago, its flora, forest and fauna'). Vidal brought live plants to be exhibited at the newly constructed Palacio de Cristal in the Retiro Park.

Palacio de Cristal

Vidal served as director of the Botanical Garden of Manila (now Mehan garden) from 1878 until his death in 1889 from cholera. A statue of Vidal by Enric Clarasó was erected in the Garden. It survived the end of Spanish rule in Manila, but it no longer exists.

== Honours ==
In 1875 Vidal was awarded the Order of the Crown by Prussia for translating two books about the Philippines from German into Spanish. One of the works was Reisen in den Philippinen by Fedor Jagor.

For his contribution to the Philippines Exposition, Vidal received the honour of entry into the Order of Isabella the Catholic.

== Plant specimens ==
The herbarium in Manila was destroyed in a fire in 1897, but some of Vidal's specimens of Philippine flora are preserved in Europe to this day, at Kew, where he collaborated with Robert Allen Rolfe, and at Madrid's Real Jardín Botánico, where since Vidal's death Benjamín Máximo Laguna and later scholars have worked on them.
