= Colonial exhibition =

Type of exhibition held to promote colonial empires

Counter-exposition to the 1931 Colonial Exhibition in Paris.

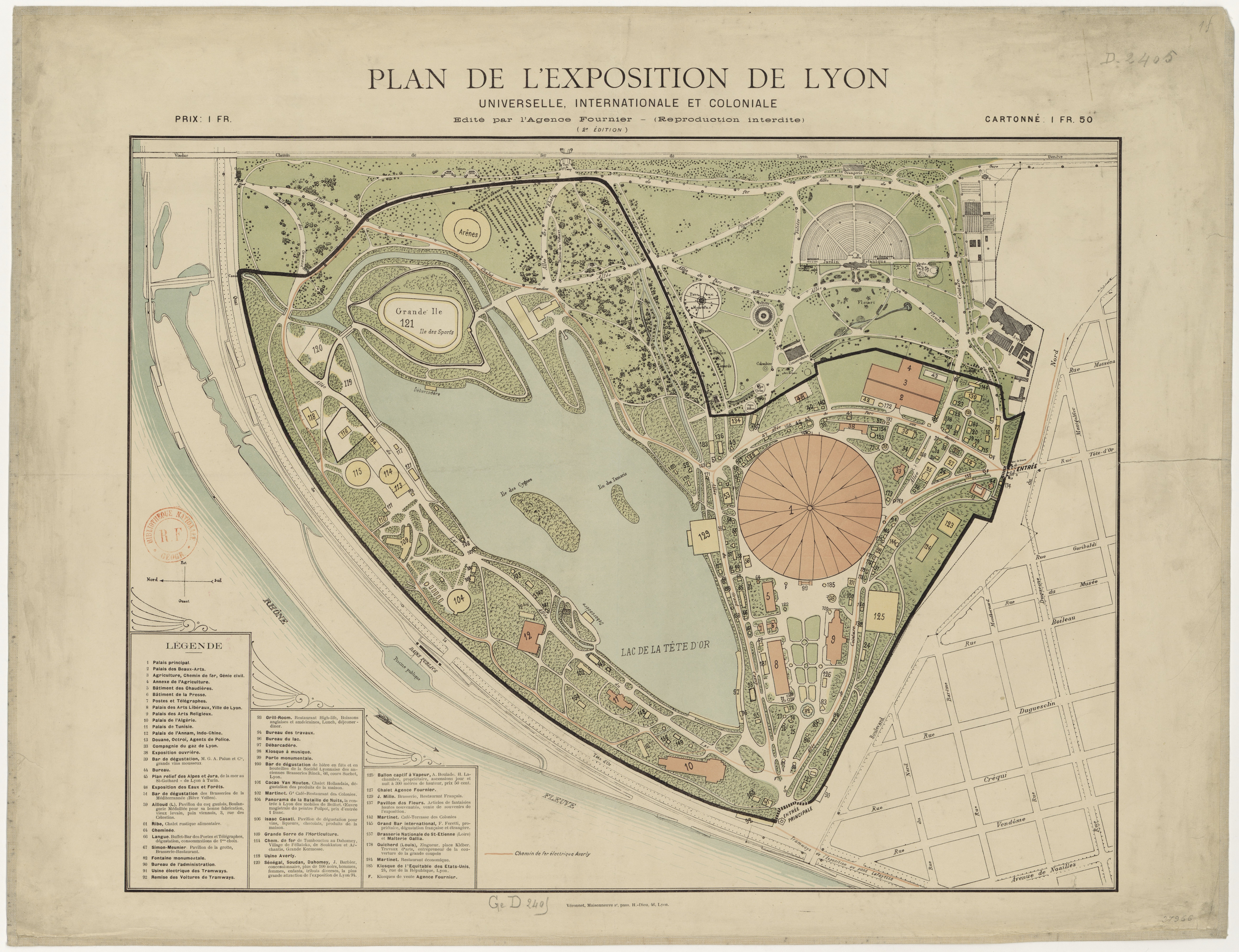
Map of the 1894 Lyon fair

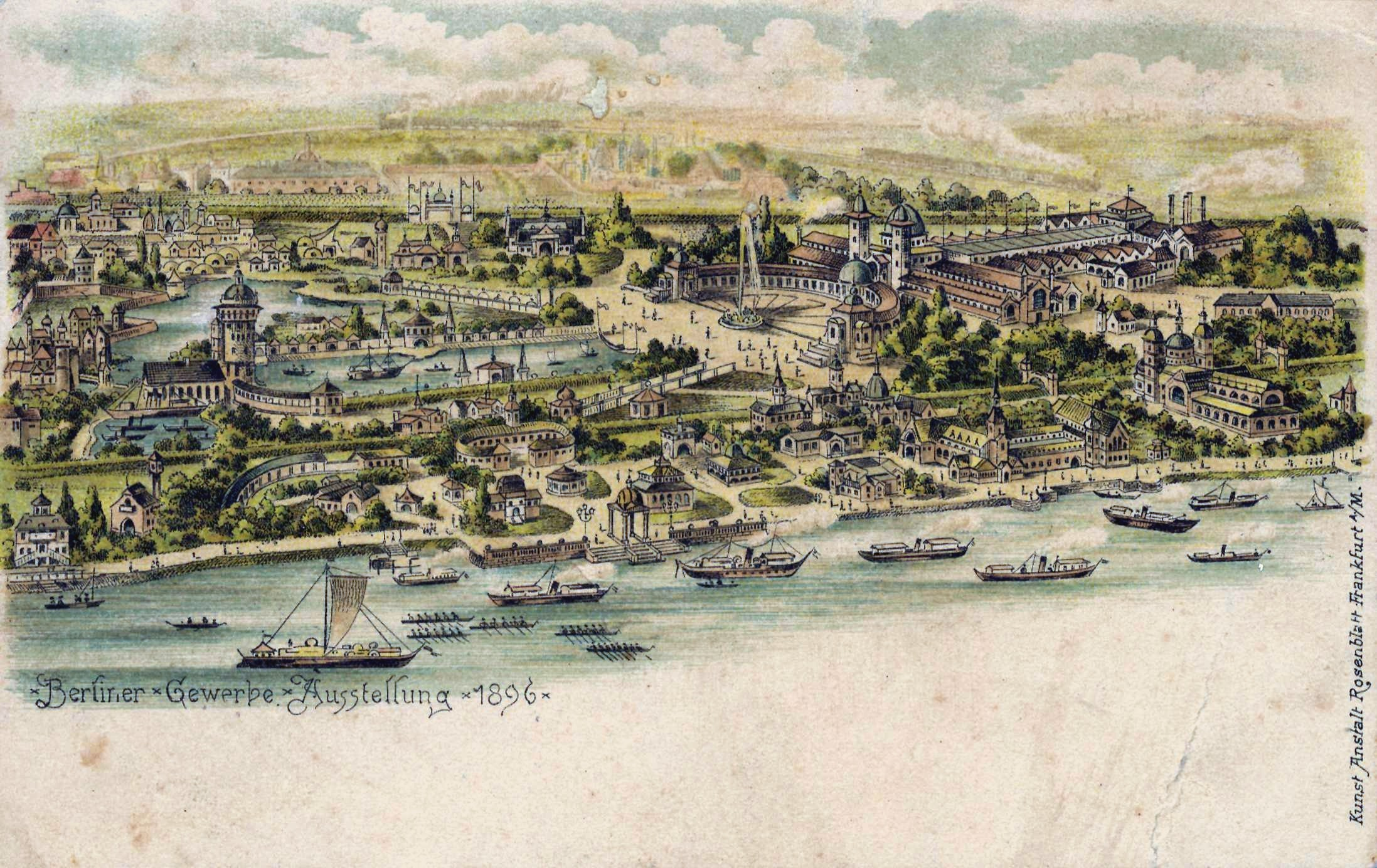
Overview of 1896 exhibition

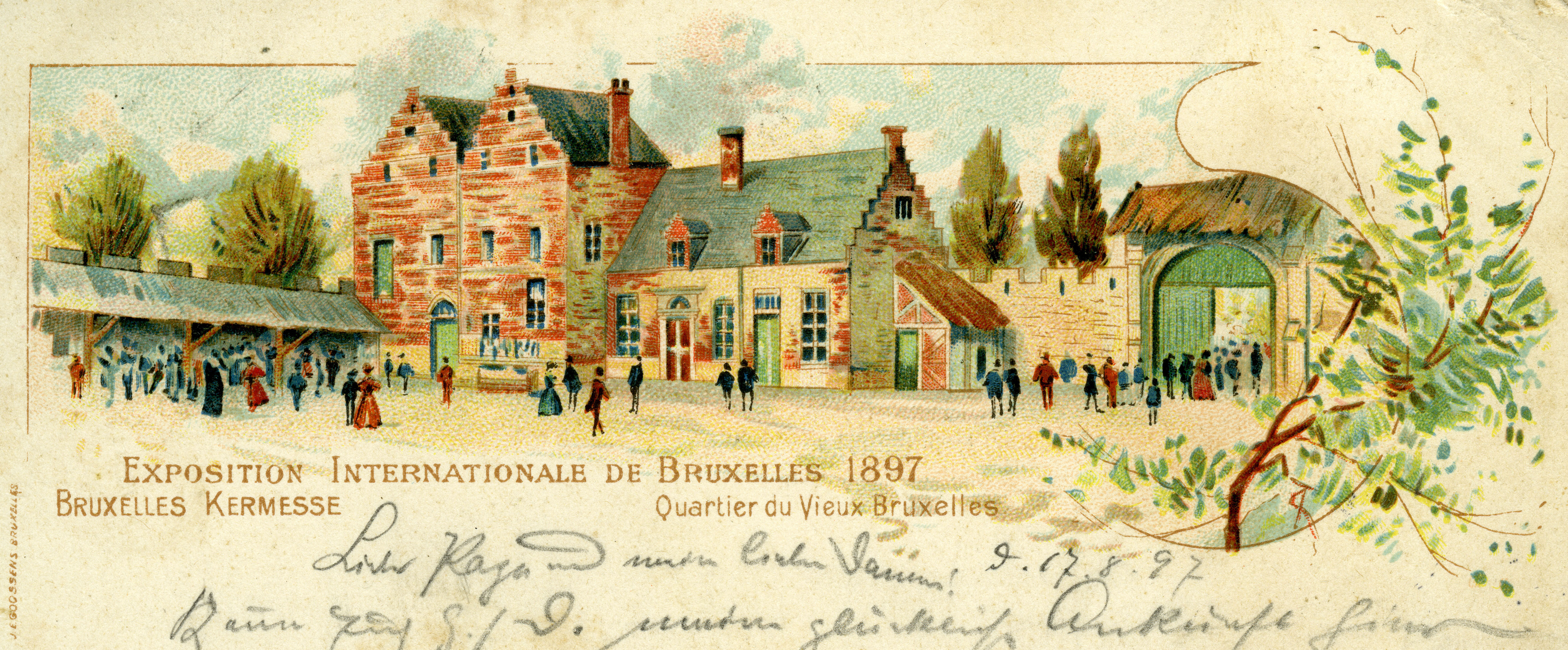
Postcard from Brussels International

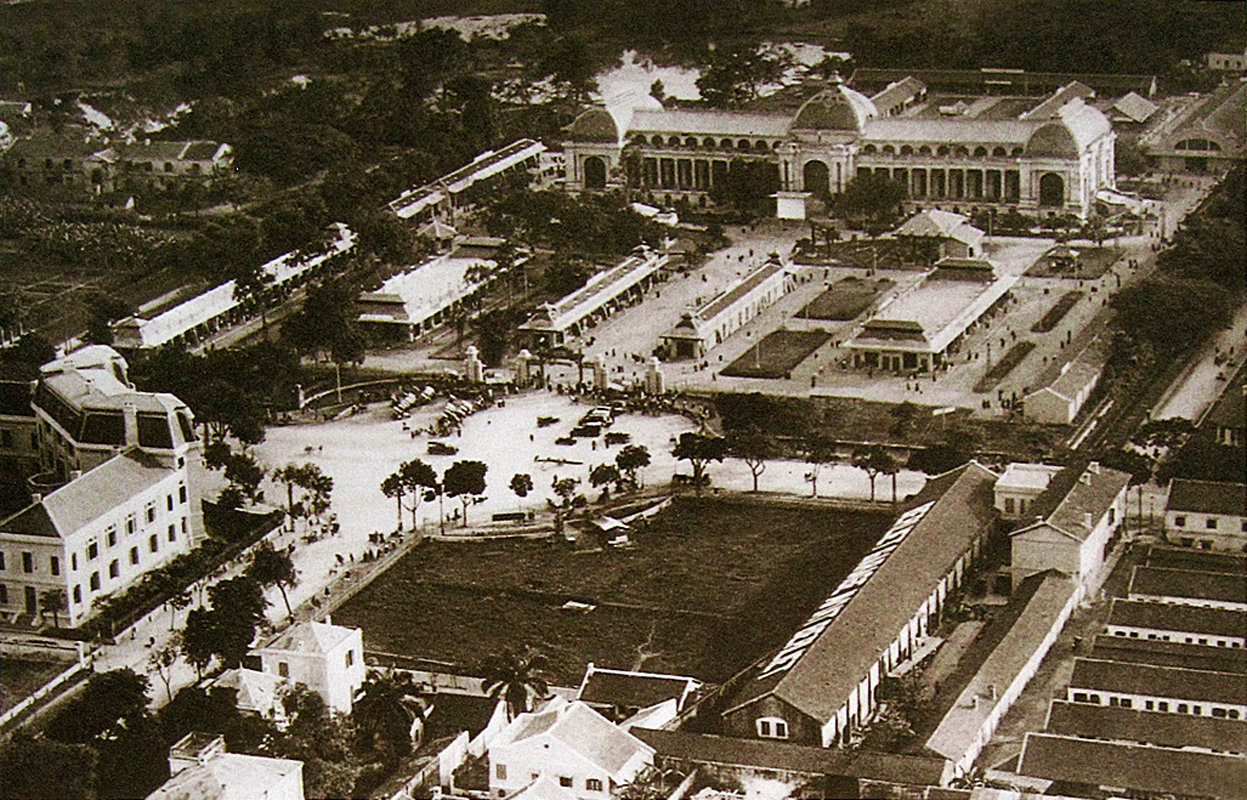
Postcard of the Palais d'expositions at Hanoi Exhibition

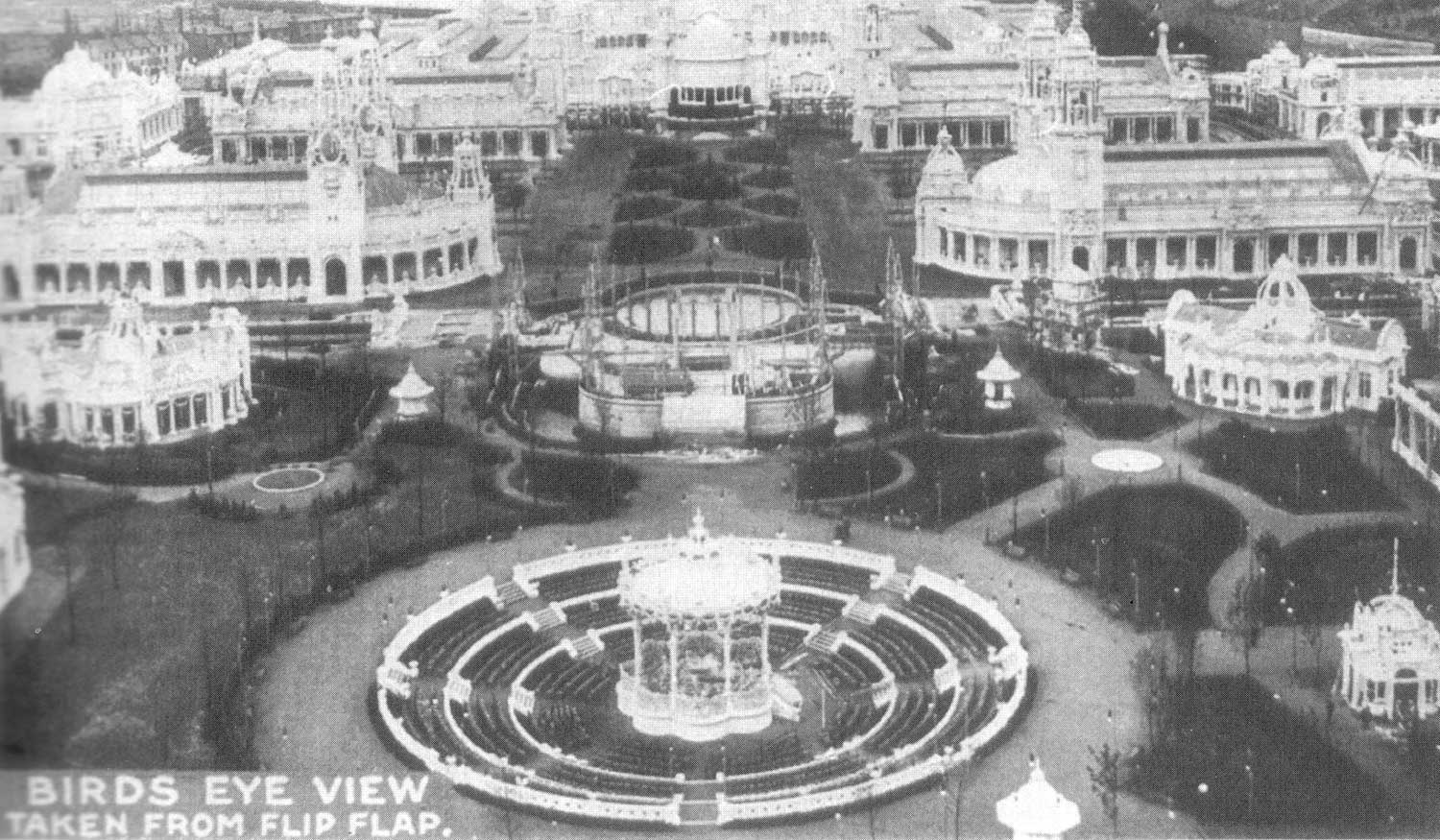
Bird's eye view of the Franco-British exhibition

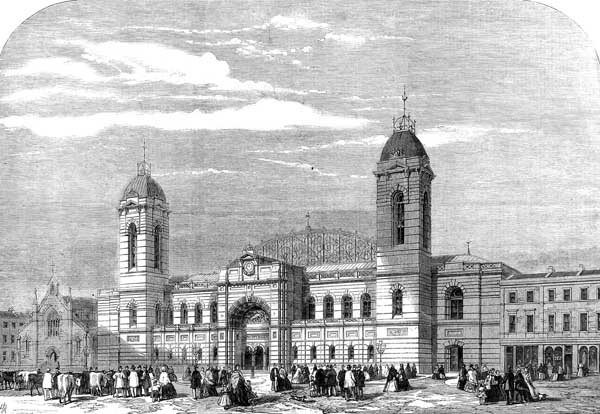
The Royal Agricultural Hall site of the rubber exhibition

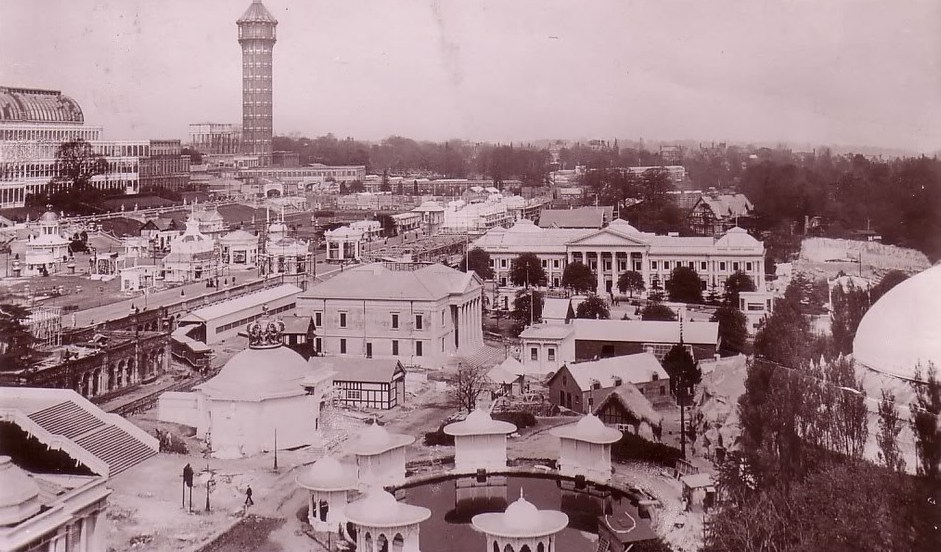
Replica of Canada Parliament Building at Festival of Empire

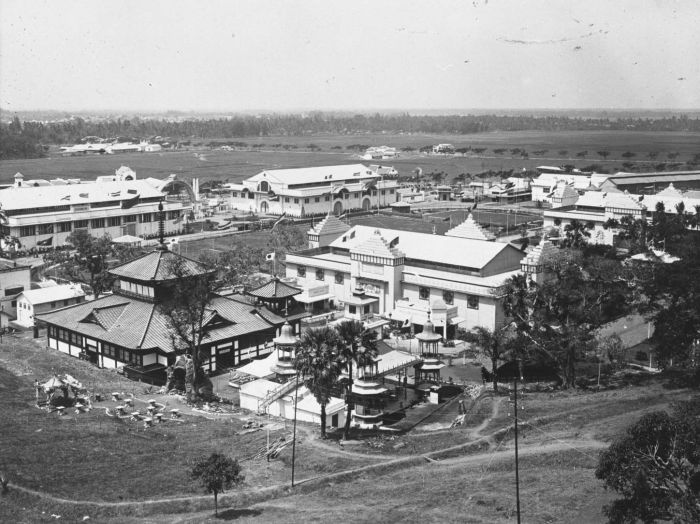
Overview of the colonial exhibition of Semarang.

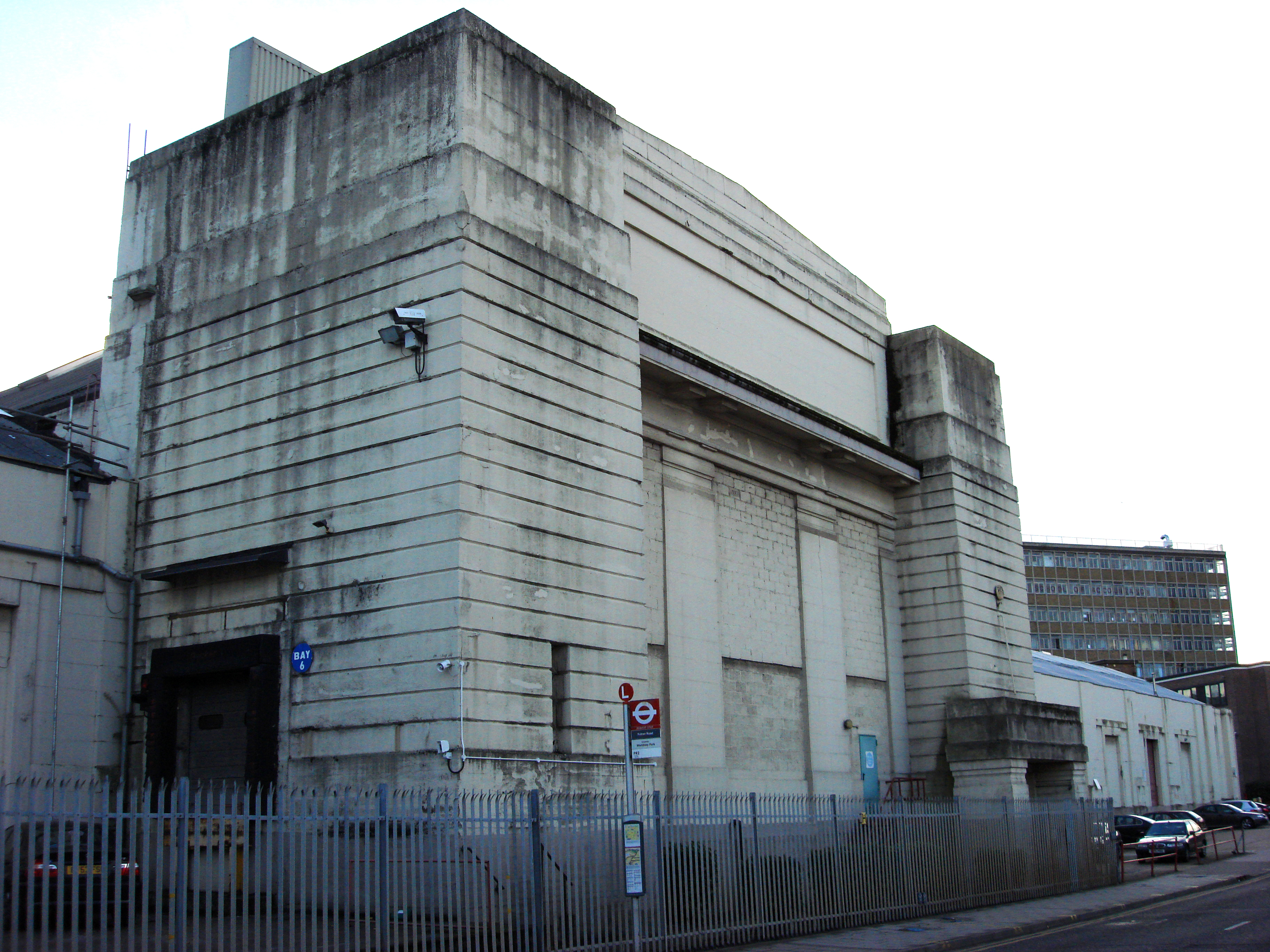
The Palace of Industry building from British Empire Exhibition

A colonial exhibition was a type of international exhibition that was held to boost trade. During the 1880s and beyond, colonial exhibitions had the additional aim of bolstering popular support for the various colonial empires during the New Imperialism period, which included the scramble for Africa.

The first colonial exhibition, in Victoria, Australia, in 1866, was the progeny of 25 years of similar exhibitions held in Melbourne, in which other colonies within the Australian continent participated.

Perhaps the most notable colonial exhibition was the 1931 Paris Colonial Exposition, which lasted six months and sold 33 million tickets. Paris's Colonial Exhibition opened on 6 May 1931 on 110 hectares (272 acres) of the Bois de Vincennes. The exhibition included dozens of temporary museums and façades representing the various colonies of the European nations, as well as several permanent buildings. Among these were the Palais de la Porte Dorée, designed by architect Albert Laprode, which then housed the Musée permanent des Colonies, and serves today as the Cité nationale de l'histoire de l'immigration.

The French Communist Party held an anti-colonial counter-exhibition near the 1931 Colonial Exhibition, titled The Truth About the Colonies. The first section was dedicated to crimes during the colonial conquests, and quoted Albert Londres and André Gide's criticisms of forced labour. The second one contrasted the Soviet Union's "nationalities policy" with "imperialist colonialism".

Germany and Portugal also staged colonial exhibitions. Human zoos were featured in some of the exhibitions, such as the Parisian 1931 exhibition.

The Empire of Japan hosted colonial showcases in exhibitions within the Home Islands, but also held several full-scale expositions inside its colonies of Korea and Taiwan. These exhibitions had objectives comparable to their European counterparts, highlighting economic achievements and social progress under Japanese colonial rule to Japanese and colonial subjects alike.

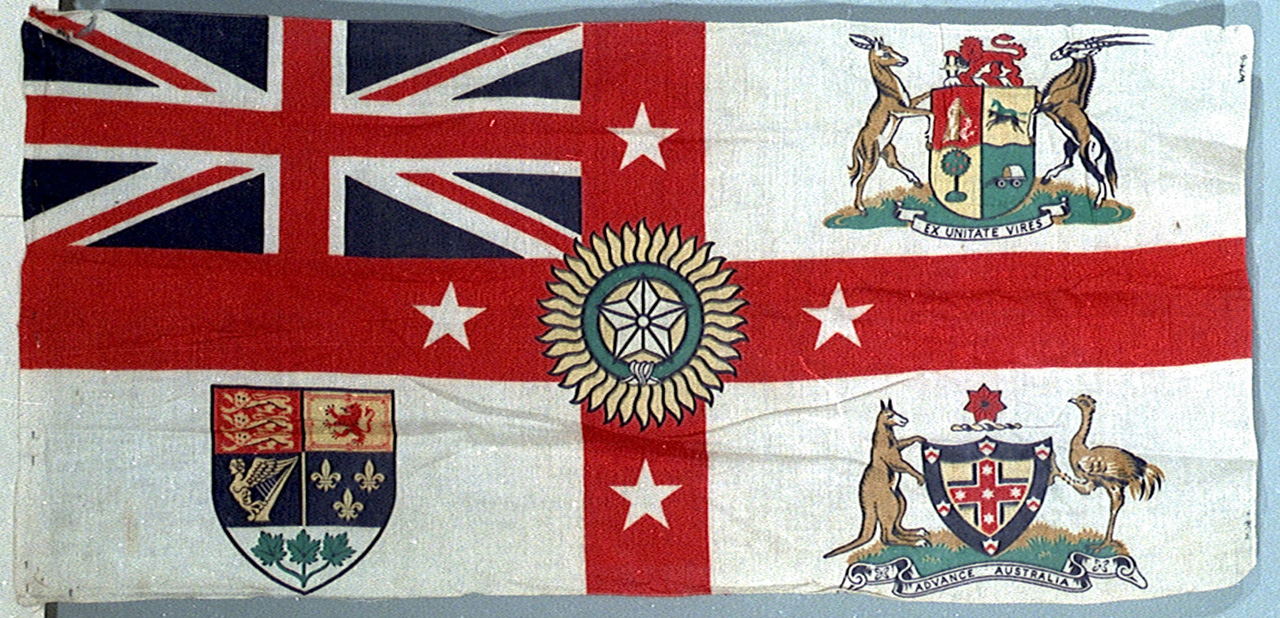
A British Empire flag distributed at the British Empire Exhibition.

Brussels was the venue for the last colonial exhibition: the Belgian Foire coloniale, held in 1948.

== Colonial exhibitions ==
Exhibitions that may be described as colonial exhibitions include the following.

Name of exhibition	Date	Location	Country	Notes
Sydney International Exhibition	1879	Sydney	New South Wales	(Note: Exhibitions in Australia started 25 years earlier, when the colonies of Victoria and New South Wales, inspired by the 1851 Great Exhibition in London, mounted their own exhibitions in 1854 in preparation for the Paris Exhibition of 1855 and in 1861 for the London Exhibition of 1862. These earlier exhibitions were known as Metropolitan Intercolonial Exhibitions: "intercolonial" referring to the Australian colonies that became states of Australia after federation in 1901, not those in separate countries of the British Empire.)
Internationale Koloniale en Uitvoerhandel Tentoonstelling	1883	Amsterdam	Netherlands	
Colonial and Indian Exhibition	1886	London	United Kingdom	
Philippines Exposition	1887	Madrid	Spain	
Exposition Universelle	1889	Paris	France	
Exposition internationale et coloniale	1894	Lyon	France	
Exposição Insular e Colonial Portuguesa	1894	Porto	Portugal	
Great Industrial Exposition	1896	Berlin	Germany	
Exposition nationale et coloniale	1896	Rouen	France	
Brussels International	1897	Brussels	Belgium	
Exposition internationale et coloniale	1898	Rochefort	France	
Greater America Exposition	1899	Omaha	United States	
Hanoi exhibition	1902	Hanoi	French Indochina	
United States, Colonial and International Exposition	1902	New York City	United States	
Marseille colonial exhibition	1906	Marseille	France	
Exposition Coloniale	1907	Paris	France	
Franco-British Exhibition	1908	London	United Kingdom	(Note: The exhibition celebrated the Entente Cordiale signed in 1904 by the United Kingdom and France.)
Festival of Empire	1911	London	United Kingdom	
Exposition Universelle	1910	Brussels	Belgium	
International exhibition of marine and maritime hygiene	1914	Genoa	Italy	
Colonial Exhibition	1914	Semarang	Dutch East Indies	(Note: The exhibition was to "give a comprehensive picture of the Dutch Indies in their present prosperous condition".)
Joseon Industrial Exhibition	1915	Gyeongseong (Seoul)	(Japan) Japanese Korea	
International Exhibition of Rubber and Other Tropical Products	1921	London	United Kingdom	
Exposition nationale coloniale	1922	Marseille	France	
British Empire Exhibition	1924	London	United Kingdom	
Chosun Exhibition	1929	Gyeongseong (Seoul)	(Japan) Japanese Korea	
Exposition internationale coloniale, maritime et d'art flamand	1930	Antwerp	Belgium	
Paris Colonial Exposition	1931	Paris	France	(Note: This six-month exhibition attempted to display the diverse cultures and immense resources of France's colonial possessions.)
Exposição Colonial Portuguesa	1934	Porto	Portugal	
Taiwan Exposition	1935	Taihoku (Taipei)	(Japan) Japanese Formosa	
Empire Exhibition	1936	Johannesburg	South Africa	(Note: The Empire Exhibition held in Johannesburg from 15 September 1936 to 15 January 1937 was the first time the Empire Exhibition was held outside of Britain. It was seen as an opportunity for the expansion of British trade. It coincided with Johannesburg's Jubilee and was staged on a grand scale, with over twenty acres of industrial and commercial exhibits. It was opened by the Governor-General.)
Exposition Internationale des Arts et Techniques dans la Vie Moderne	1937	Paris	France	
Empire Exhibition	1938	Glasgow	United Kingdom	
Deutsche Kolonial Ausstellung	1939	Dresden	Nazi Germany	
Exposição do Mundo Português	1940	Lisbon	Portugal	(Note: Held primarily as a celebration of the Estado Novo. One foreign nation, Brazil, participated in the exhibition.)
Foire coloniale	1948	Brussels	Belgium	

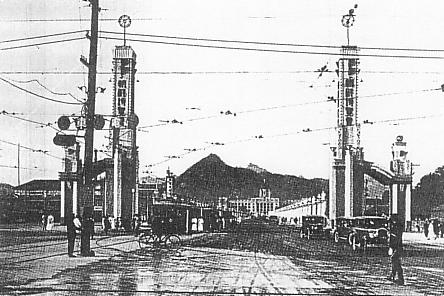
Entrance to the Korea Exhibition, Seoul, 1929

== Bibliography ==
- Alexander C.T. Geppert, Fleeting Cities. Imperial Expositions in Fin-de-Siècle Europe, Basingstoke/New York: Palgrave Macmillan, 2010.

== See also ==
- Colonialism
- Human zoo
- List of world's fairs
- Impact of Western European colonialism and colonisation
