= Lithocarpus jordanae =

Scientific classification
- Kingdom: Plantae
- Clade: Tracheophytes
- Clade: Angiosperms
- Clade: Eudicots
- Clade: Rosids
- Order: Fagales
- Family: Fagaceae
- Genus: Lithocarpus
- Species: L. jordanae

Binomial name
- Lithocarpus jordanae (Laguna) Rehder

Species of plant

Lithocarpus jordanae is a species of flowering plant in the family Fagaceae.

It was classified as a new species by Benjamín Máximo Laguna in 1875 with the basionym Quercus jordanae. Alfred Rehder reclassified it as a Lithocarpus rather than an oak. It remains dedicated to Ramón Jordana y Morera. Jordana was an employee of the Philippines Forestry Service who discovered the plant growing in large numbers in the Caraballo Mountains of Luzon. It has since been become threatened as the result of deforestation, although several portions of the mountain range where it was discovered are protected.
