= Human zoo =

Public exhibits of humans

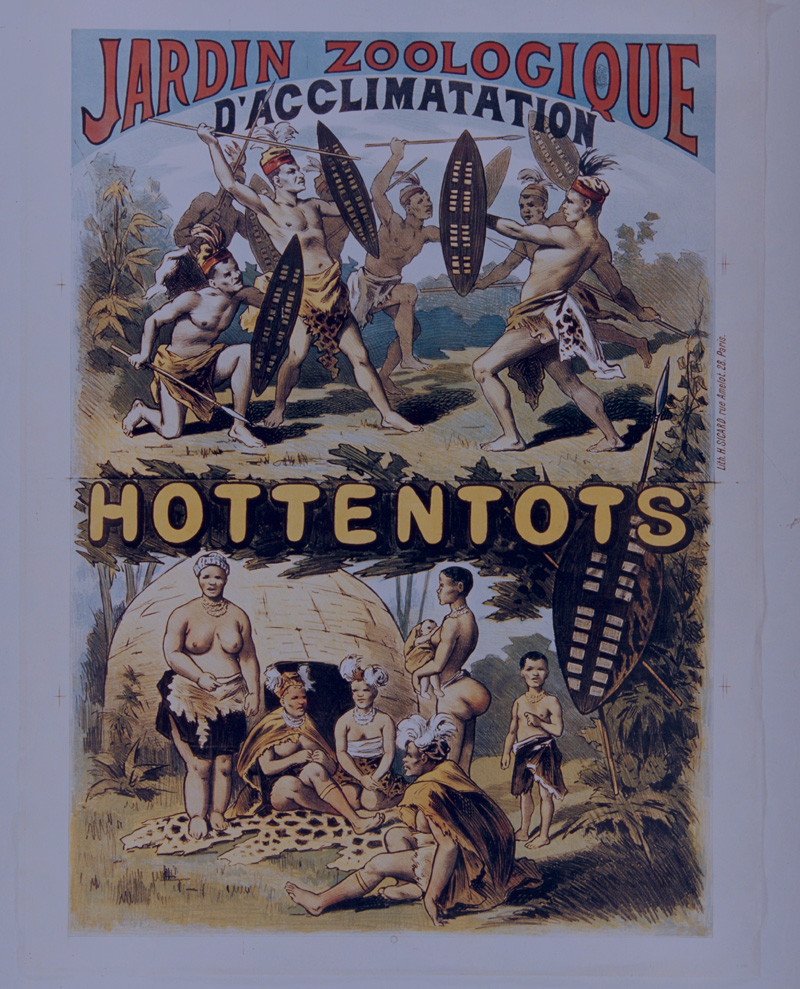
Poster for an anthropological exhibition in Paris, c. 1870

Human zoos, also known as ethnological expositions, was a practice of publicly displaying people. In some cases these displays were voluntary on the part of people who willingly agreed, while in other cases the people were displayed without their consent.

Such practices have been found in cultures worldwide, dating back to at least the 1500s. The practice was popular in the 1900s and early 20th Century. In many of these cases, those displayed were typically of indigenous people, and the exhibits were often linked to colonialism and imperialism. These displays often emphasized the supposed inferiority of the exhibits' culture, and implied the superiority of Western civilization, Imperial Japan, and other ruling powers through tropes that depicted marginalized groups as savage or primitive, while providing justification for continued subjugation of these populations. Such displays featured in multiple colonial exhibitions and at temporary exhibitions in animal zoos. Such displays were controversial at the time, with protestors describing them as degrading and some organizers being forced to end the human exhibits due to maltreatment.

== Etymology ==
The term "human zoo" was not generally used by contemporaries of the shows, and was popularized by the French researcher Pascal Blanchard. The term has been criticized for denying the agency of the shows' non-European performers.

According to Sandra Koutsoukos, the term "human zoos" was likely coined by French historians and anthropologists and first appeared in a 2002 publication. The term is widely used in academia to critique such events as offensive, racist and degrading.

== Early precedents ==
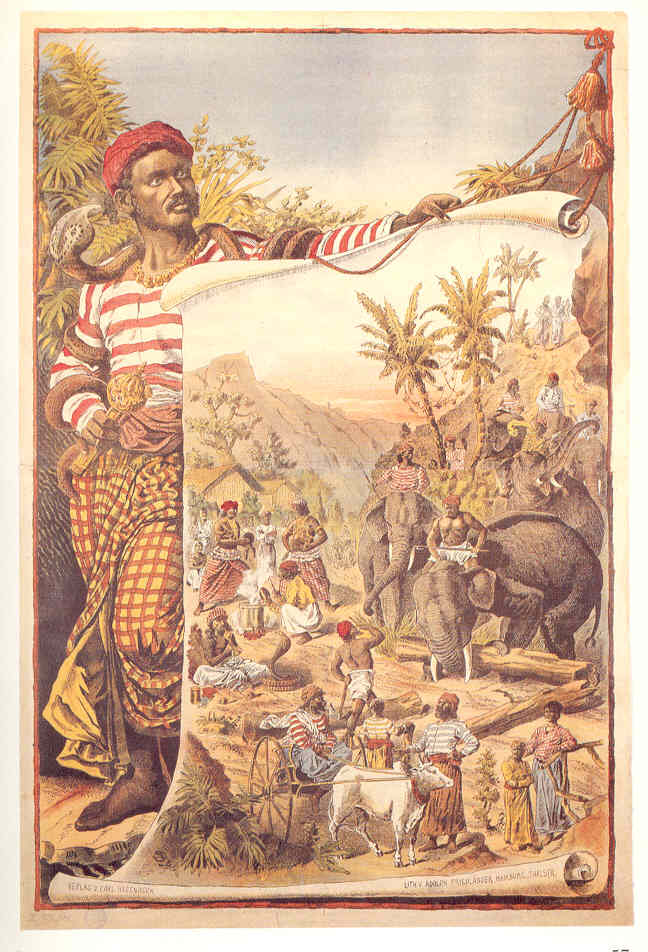
Ad for a Carl Hagenbeck show (1886)

Public displays of people predated the ethnological exhibitions that became common during the nineteenth century.

One of the earliest recorded examples was the zoo of Moctezuma in central Mexico in the 1500s, which contained not only a large collection of animals but also people, including dwarfs, albinos and hunchbacks.

During the Renaissance, the Medici family maintained large menageries in Italy. In the 16th century, Cardinal Hippolytus Medici reportedly kept people from many different backgrounds alongside exotic animals, including individuals described as Savages, as well as Moors, Tartars, Indians, Turks and Africans.

The Ottoman Empire had a tradition of using dwarves and other people with unusual attributes as companions or jesters, at least by the 16th and 17th Centuries. These people were not displayed for the public, but were held in a form of forced servitude in part due to their appearance.

In 1691, Jeoly, a tattooed man from Miangas in modern-day Indonesia, was purchased by the English explorer William Dampier while he was in Mindanao (modern-day Philippines) and exhibited in London. Dampier also intended to exhibit Jeoly's mother, but she died at sea before reaching England. Jeoly was marketed as "Prince Giolo" and remained on display for three months before dying of smallpox.

One of the first modern public human exhibitions was P. T. Barnum's exhibition of Joice Heth on 25 February 1835, who was falsely claimed as a nursemaid for George Washington. Barnum followed this with exhibitions of Chang and Eng Bunker, the conjoined twins later known as the Siamese twins. Such exhibitions were common in circuses and freak shows. Saartjie Baartman, of the Nama people, was exhibited in Britain and France under the name "Hottentot Venus" until her death in 1815.

During the 1850s, Maximo and Bartola, two microcephalic siblings from El Salvador, were exhibited in Europe and the United States under the names "Aztec Children" and "Aztec Lilliputians". Human zoos became common during the 1870s, in the period of New Imperialism.

== Expansion of ethnological exhibitions ==
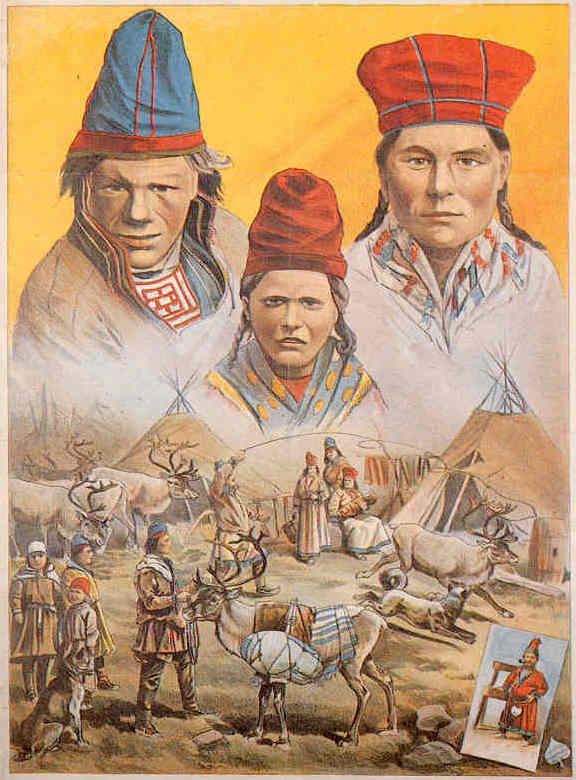
Ad for an 1893–1894 ethnological exposition of Sámi in Hamburg-Saint Paul

During the 1870s, public displays of individual people increasingly gave way to larger ethnological exhibitions featuring communities and groups of people. As European colonial empires expanded, these exhibitions became increasingly common across Europe and North America. Organizers promoted them as educational or scientific displays, but they often portrayed Indigenous peoples and other colonized groups as representatives of supposedly primitive cultures.

One of the leading promoters of this new style of exhibition was German animal trader Carl Hagenbeck. In 1874, at the suggestion of German painter and illustrator Heinrich Leutemann, he organized an exhibition of Sámi people that differed from earlier displays by recreating what organizers presented as their natural environment. People were exhibited alongside animals, plants, and reconstructed buildings intended to resemble their homelands, creating the impression that visitors were encountering distant cultures firsthand. Hagenbeck later organized exhibitions featuring Nubians in 1876 and Inuit in 1880.

During the following decades, ethnological exhibitions became a regular feature of zoological gardens, colonial exhibitions, and world's fairs across Europe and North America. At the Jardin d'Acclimatation, a zoological garden in Paris, exhibitions featuring Nubian and Inuit began in 1877 and attracted large audiences. Between 1877 and 1912, approximately thirty ethnological exhibitions were presented there.

By the end of the 19th century, human zoos had become a common feature of world's fairs, colonial exhibitions, and zoological gardens throughout Europe and North America.

== Gender and objectification ==
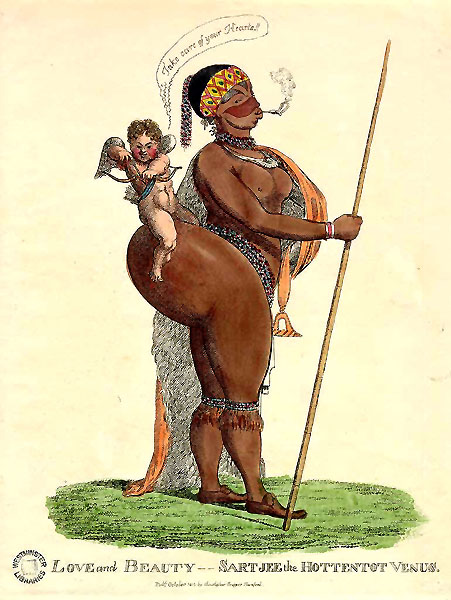
A caricature of Saartjie Baartman, called the Hottentot Venus. Born to a Khoisan family, she was displayed in European cities in the early 19th century.

Modern scholars have noted how these exhibits often reduced people to racial, cultural, or physical types for observation and study. Women were frequently sexualized, while both women and men were photographed, classified, examined, or displayed in ways that emphasized perceived difference and exoticism.

One of the best-known examples is Saartjie Baartman, the African woman often referred to as the "Hottentot Venus". During the early 19th century, Baartman was exhibited in Britain and France, where promoters emphasized her body and portrayed her as a curiosity. Visitors were encouraged to inspect and touch her, particularly her buttocks, which were presented as evidence of supposed physical difference. After her death in 1815, her remains were dissected and displayed at the Musée de l'Homme in Paris without her consent.

Historian Dominika Czarnecka argues the popularity of ethnographic exhibitions often depended on the sexualization of non-European women. Writing about exhibitions in late 19th-century Poland, she notes that women were often dressed in revealing costumes which reflected European expectations and fantasies rather than the clothing of the cultures they were claimed to represent. Although some examples were depicted as Amazon warriors, contemporary accounts frequently focused on their appearance and clothing.

At the World's Columbian Exposition in Chicago in 1893 and the Pan-American Exposition in Buffalo in 1901, the belly dancer Little Egypt was photographed as a catalogued "type" by Charles Dudley Arnold and Harlow Higinbotham.

By the 1930s, a new form of human exhibition appeared in the United States as nude shows presented as educational exhibits. At the Zoro Garden Nudist Colony at the Pacific International Exposition in San Diego, California (1935–1936), hired performers portrayed members of a nudist colony rather than actual nudists. At the Sally Rand Nude Ranch at the Golden Gate International Exposition in San Francisco (1939), women appeared wearing cowboy hats, gunbelts, and boots, with little other clothing. The exposition also featured a "Greenwich Village" show, described in the official guidebook as a "Model artists' colony and revue theatre".

People could also be exhibited after death. Angelo Soliman, a man of Central African origin who became a prominent figure in Viennese society, was displayed after his death. His preserved body was exhibited in Vienna as an ethnographic specimen.

== Scientific racism ==
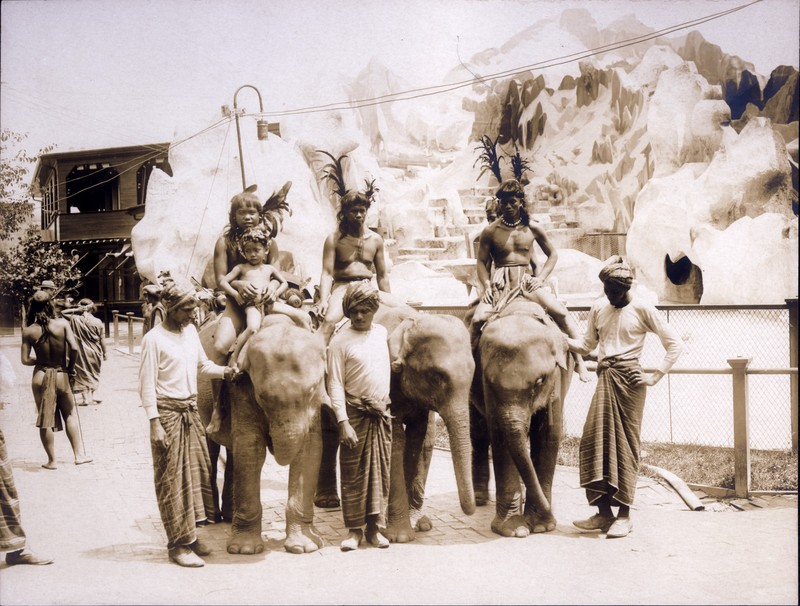
A group of Igorot people displayed during the St. Louis World's Fair, 1904

Human zoos were closely associated with scientific racism during the late 19th and early 20th centuries. Exhibitions were often presented as educational or scientific displays and were used to classify human populations according to perceived levels of cultural and biological development.

Many exhibitions portrayed non-European peoples as living examples of an earlier stage of human development. Such displays supported imperialist narratives and were used to justify the subjugation of colonized peoples.

In Germany, ethnological exhibitions and museums were promoted as educational institutions. Human displays were incorporated into zoological and anthropological exhibits, where visitors were encouraged to compare different cultures and societies. By the late 19th century, some exhibitions presented human groups as occupying different positions on an evolutionary scale, with Western Europeans portrayed as the most advanced.

Human zoos at international expositions and world's fairs were often used to demonstrate contemporary ideas about race, civilization, and human progress such as happened at the Louisiana Purchase Exposition of 1904. Associated events such as "Anthropology Days" compared participants through athletic competitions that organizers linked to contemporary ideas about race, civilization, and human progress.

== Human zoos at world's fairs and international exhibitions ==
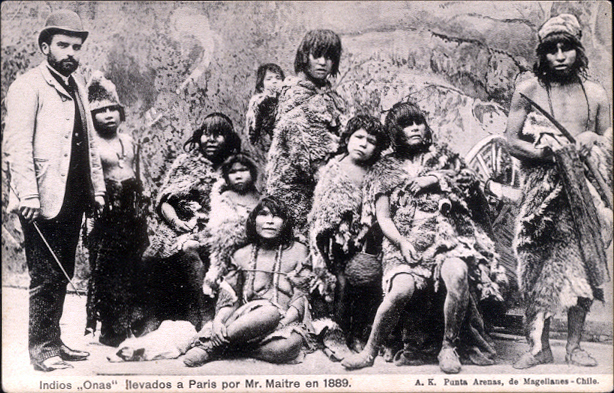
The Selk'nam people of Tierra del Fuego, brought to the 1889 Paris World's Fair by Belgian whaling entrepreneur Maurice Maître

During the late 19th and early 20th centuries, world's fairs, colonial exhibitions, and other international events helped popularize human zoos in Europe and North America. Many were organized by imperial powers and featured people brought from their colonies. Participants were often housed in reconstructed villages and displayed performing daily activities for visitors.

By the late 19th century, human displays had become a common feature of major international exhibitions. At the 1889 Paris World's Fair, approximately 400 Indigenous people were displayed in a "Negro Village", one of the exposition's most popular attractions. Visited by 28 million people, the fair exposed large audiences to staged representations of Indigenous and colonized peoples. Similar exhibits appeared at international exhibitions in Amsterdam, Chicago, Brussels, and Buffalo.

At the Louisiana Purchase Exposition of 1904 in St. Louis, more than 1,100 Filipinos were exhibited, while thousands of Indigenous people from around the world participated in anthropological exhibits and cultural demonstrations.

Human displays continued to appear at major exhibitions throughout the first half of the 20th century, including the British Empire Exhibition of 1924, the Paris Colonial Exposition of 1931, the Portuguese World Exhibition of 1940, and Expo 58 in Brussels.

== Exhibition practices ==
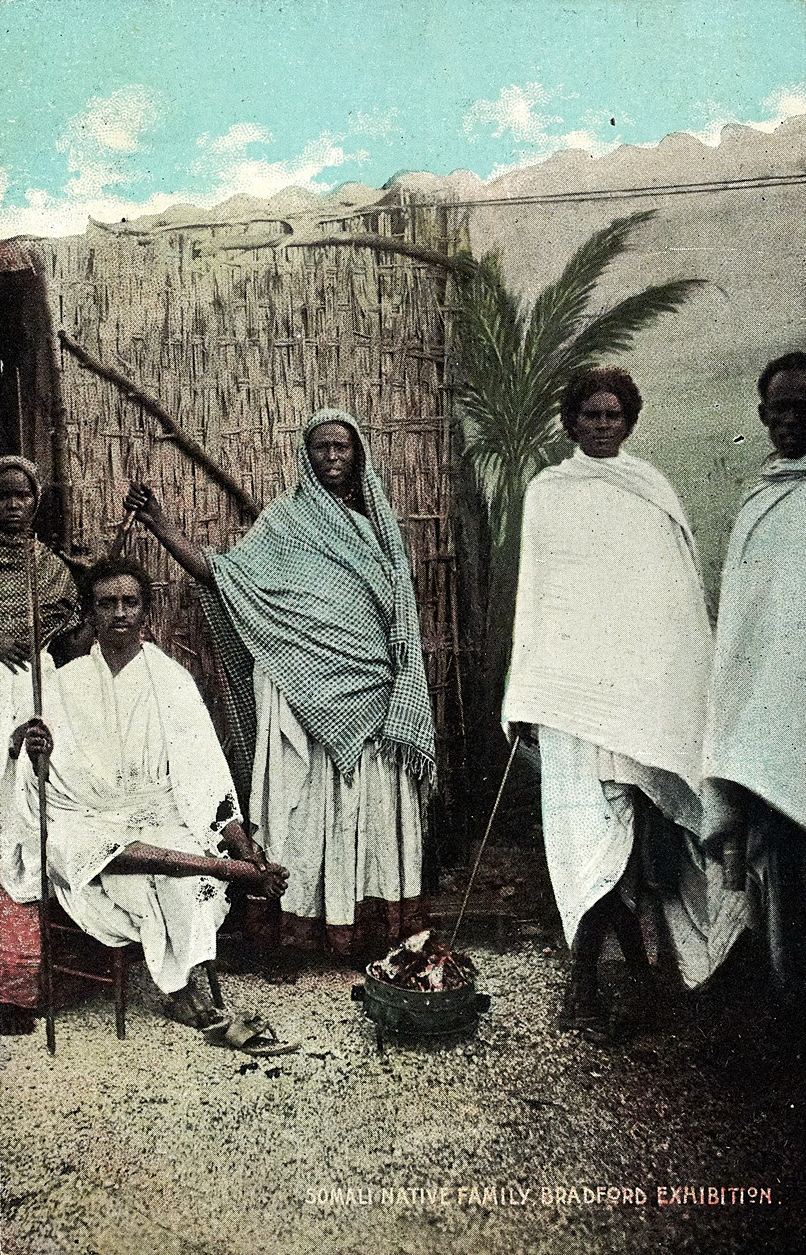
A Somali family inside a staged human exhibit at the 1904 Great Exhibition in Lister Park, Bradford

Although exhibition practices varied between countries, organizers, and venues, many human zoos of the late 19th and early 20th centuries shared common methods of staging, presentation, and interpretation. People exhibited in human zoos were commonly presented as living representatives of cultures portrayed as primitive, exotic, or fundamentally different from those of the societies hosting the exhibitions.

Reconstructed villages were among the most common features of human zoos. People on display were often housed in settings intended to represent their homelands, with traditional-style dwellings, plants, animals, and household objects arranged to create the impression of an authentic environment. During the 1870s, German animal trader Carl Hagenbeck popularized this approach by exhibiting people alongside animals and scenery intended to recreate their natural environment. Similar reconstructed villages later appeared at the 1904 Bradford Exhibition, where Somali families lived in a purpose-built village, and at the 1887 Philippine Exposition in Madrid, where buildings and landscapes were designed to evoke the Philippines.

Many people on display performed activities presented as representative of their cultures, including cooking, craftwork, music, dance, hunting, and other aspects of daily life. These performances reinforced contemporary ideas about cultural difference. At the Scottish National Exhibition of 1908 in Edinburgh, for example, residents of the Senegal Village demonstrated crafts and aspects of everyday life while living in beehive huts. Similar demonstrations also formed part of other ethnographic exhibitions.

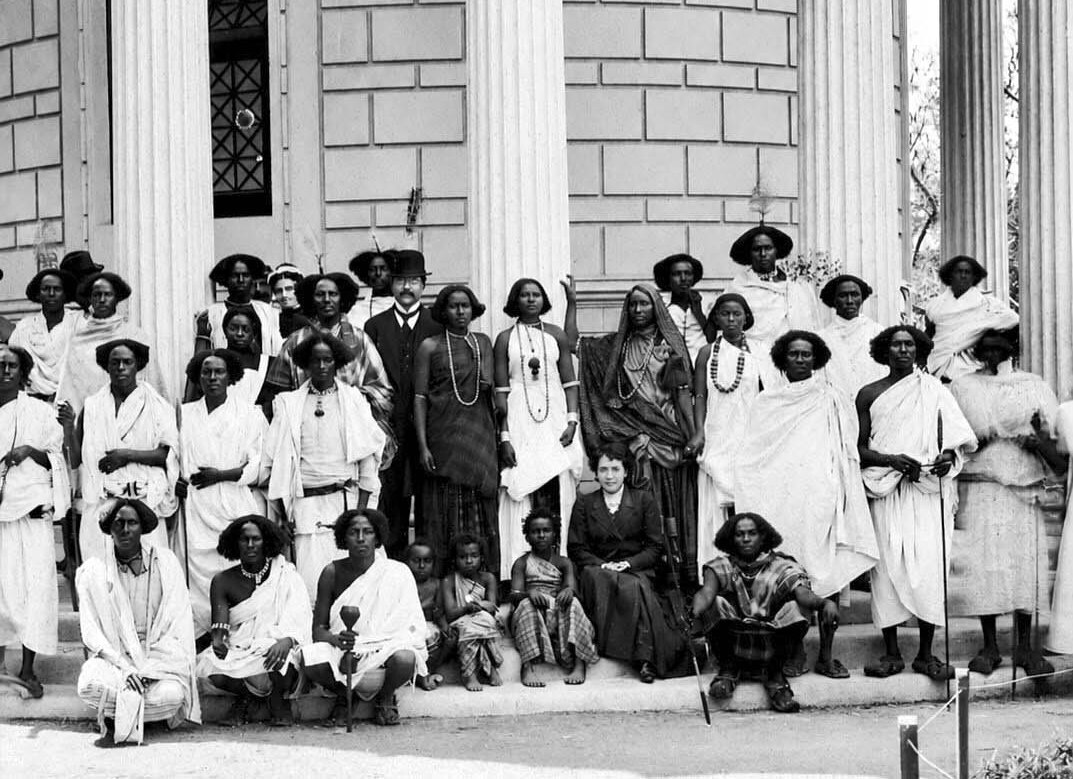
Somali performers exhibited as part of Carl Hagenbeck's ethnographic exhibition pose with Carl Hagenbeck (fourth standing from the left) and Buenos Aires Zoo director Clemente Onelli (centre, wearing a top hat), Buenos Aires, 1910.

Official guidebooks, exhibition catalogues, and labels frequently identified people on display by ethnicity, nationality, or colonial origin, shaping how visitors understood the exhibits. At the British Empire Exhibition of 1924, for example, the official guide listed participants by colonial origin and approximate numbers as part of its description of the exhibition.

The experiences of people exhibited in human zoos varied considerably. Some travelled under contracts as paid performers, while others had little control over how they were presented or the conditions under which they lived. During Expo 58 in Brussels, members of the Congolese village protested the condescending treatment they received from spectators and demanded to return home, bringing the exhibit to an early end. In Germany, some performers who remained after ethnological exhibitions ended were unable to return home and later faced discrimination under the Nazi regime.

== Regional exhibitions ==
=== Australia ===
In 2007, Adelaide Zoo ran a Human Zoo exhibition which consisted of a group of people who, as part of a study exercise, had applied to be housed in the former ape enclosure by day, but then returned home by night. The inhabitants took part in several exercises, and spectators were asked for donations towards a new ape enclosure.

=== Belgium ===
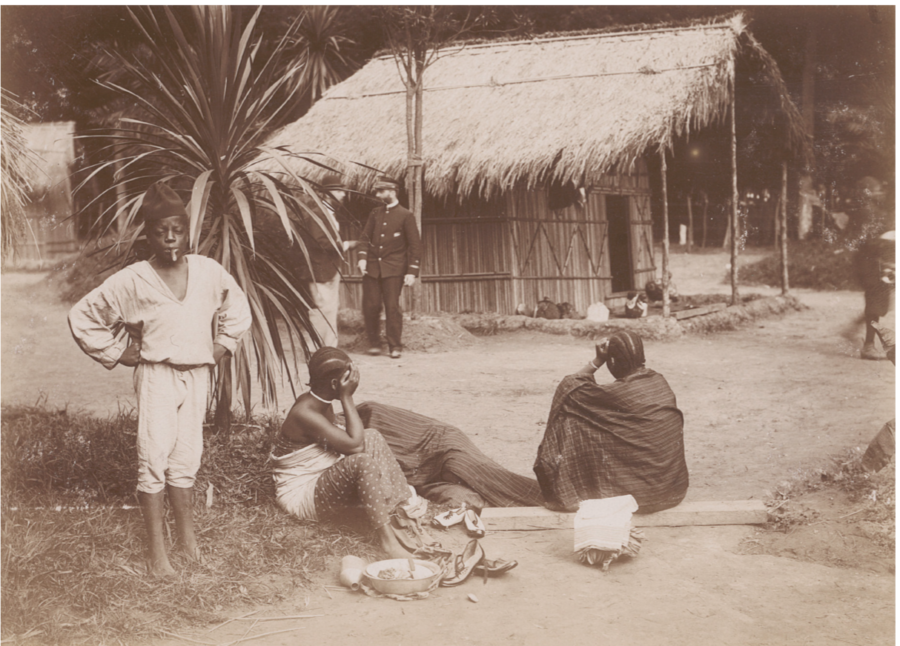
Congolese village at 1897 Brussels International Exposition (Alphonse Gautier)

The Brussels International Exposition (1897) in Tervuren featured a "Congolese Village" that displayed African people in ersatz interpretations of native settings.

A Congolese village was displayed at the Brussels 1958 World's Fair. The Congolese on display were among 598 people—including 273 men, 128 women and 197 children, a total of 183 families. Eight-month-old baby Juste Bonaventure Langa died during Expo 58; he rests in the Tervuren cemetery. In mid-July, the Congolese protested the condescending treatment they were receiving from spectators and demanded to be sent home, abruptly ending the exhibit and eliciting some sympathy from European newspapers.

=== Canada ===
From 1936 to 1943, the Canadian province of Ontario displayed the Dionne quintuplets, five white French Canadian sisters. The provincial government had removed the girls from their birth family, and showed them in a human zoo called Quintland.

=== France ===
In 1931, around 100 Kanak people from New Caledonia were displayed at the Jardin d'Acclimatation in Paris. More than six decades later, in April 1994, people from an Ivory Coast village were presented as part of an African safari attraction later called Planète Sauvage in Port-Saint-Père, near Nantes.

=== Germany ===
As ethnogenic expositions were discontinued in Germany around 1931, there were many repercussions for the performers. Many of the people brought from their homelands to work in the exhibits had created families in Germany, and there were many children that had been born in Germany. Once they no longer worked in the zoos or for performance acts, these people were stuck living in Germany where they had no rights and were harshly discriminated against. During the rise of the Nazi party, the foreign actors in these stage shows were typically able to stay out of concentration camps because there were so few of them that the Nazis did not see them as a real threat. Although they were able to avoid concentration camps, they were not able to participate in German life as citizens of ethnically German origin could. The Hitler Youth did not allow children of foreign parents to participate, and adults were rejected as German soldiers. Many ended up working in war industry factories or foreign laborer camps.

Hans Massaquoi in his 1999 book Destined to Witness describes his observation of a human zoo within the Hamburg zoo Tierpark Hagenbeck during the pre-Nazi Germany period circa 1930. An African family was placed with the animals, openly laughed at, and otherwise treated rudely by the public crowd. And then they turned upon him, a fellow spectator, due to his mixed appearance. The date, according to his book, was approximately 1930.

In July 2005, the Augsburg Zoo in Germany hosted an "African village" featuring African crafts and African cultural performances. The event was subject to widespread criticism. Defenders of the event argued that it was not racist since it did not involve exhibiting Africans in a debasing way, as had been done at zoos in the past. Critics argued that presenting African culture in the context of a zoo contributed to exoticizing and stereotyping Africans, thus laying the ground work for racial discrimination, and that solidarity and mutual understanding with African people were not primary aims of the event.

=== Portugal ===
As part of the Portuguese World Exhibition in 1940, members of a tribe from the Bissagos Islands of Guinea-Bissau were displayed on an island in a lake in the Lisbon Tropical Botanical Garden.

=== Spain ===
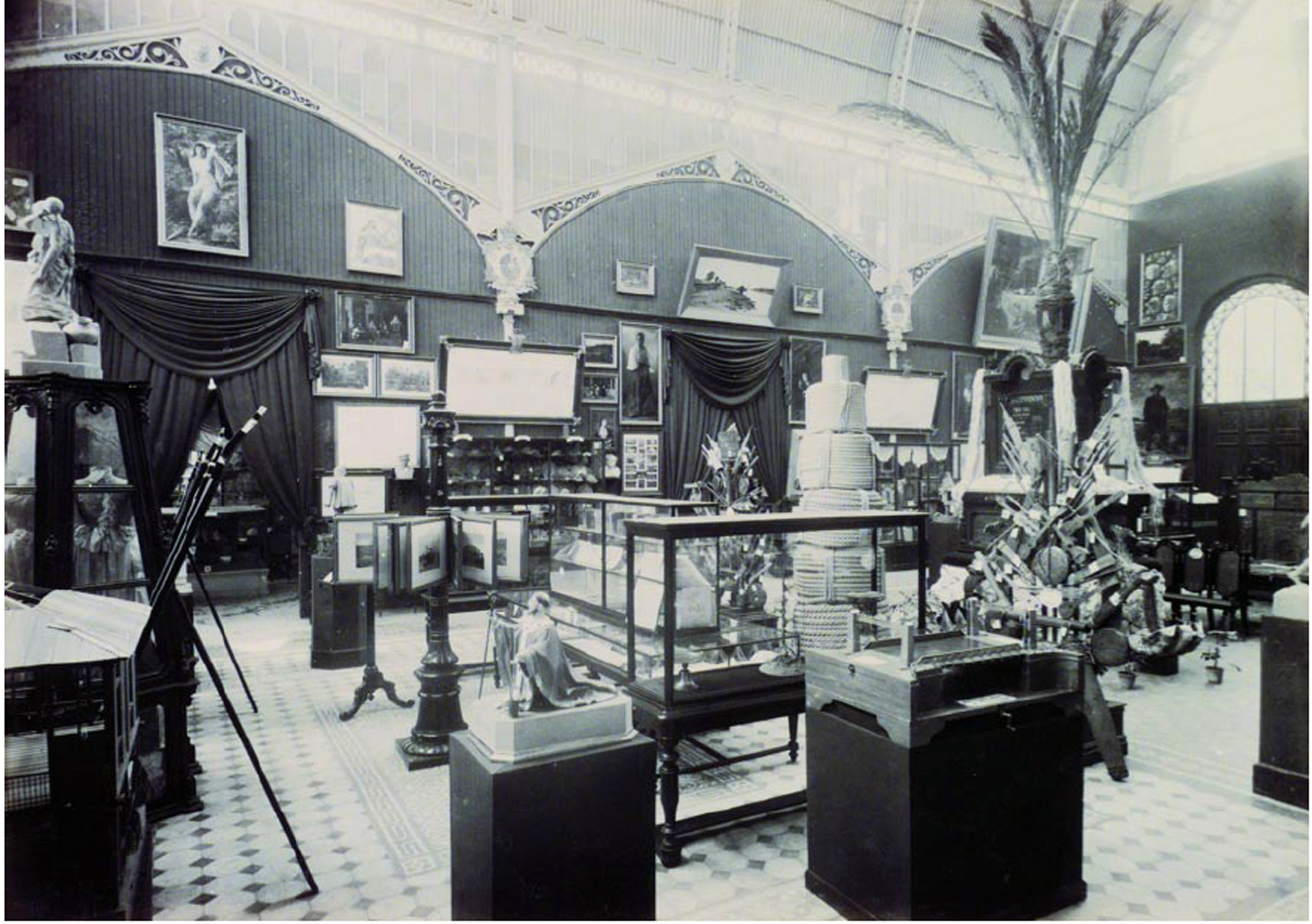
Exposición General de las Filipinas in Madrid (1887)

Between the end of the 19th century and the beginning of the 20th, several exhibitions of non-Western people were held in Spain, following those held in other areas like the United Kingdom. The first of them was held in 1887 by the Ministry of Overseas, which exhibited a group of between 40 and 50 Filipino people (then a Spanish territory) together with local products and plants in the Retiro Park in Madrid. For this exhibition, the Palacio de Cristal del Retiro was built, as well as its pond, which sought to recreate the imagined natural habitat of the exposed people. At least four people died during the exhibition. In the following years, private companies organized similar exhibitions in Barcelona and Madrid, including of people who were not from Spanish territories, like the Ashanti or Inuit. Until 1918, exhibitions of African people were held in the Ronda de la Universitat in Barcelona, which were later taken to other European countries. There are also records of another exhibition in the Ibero-American Exposition of Seville in 1929 and an additional one of Fang people from Equatorial Guinea in Valencia in 1942. Until 1997, the "Negro of Banyoles", an embalmed African man, was exhibited in the Darder Museum in Girona.

In 1886, the Spanish displayed natives of the Philippines in an exhibition, as people whom they had civilized. This event helped inspire the 1896 Philippine revolution. Queen Consort of Spain, Maria Cristina of Austria, afterwards institutionalized the business of human zoos. By 1887, indigenous Igorot people & animals were sent to Madrid and were exhibited in a human zoo at the newly constructed Palacio de Cristal del Retiro.

=== United States ===
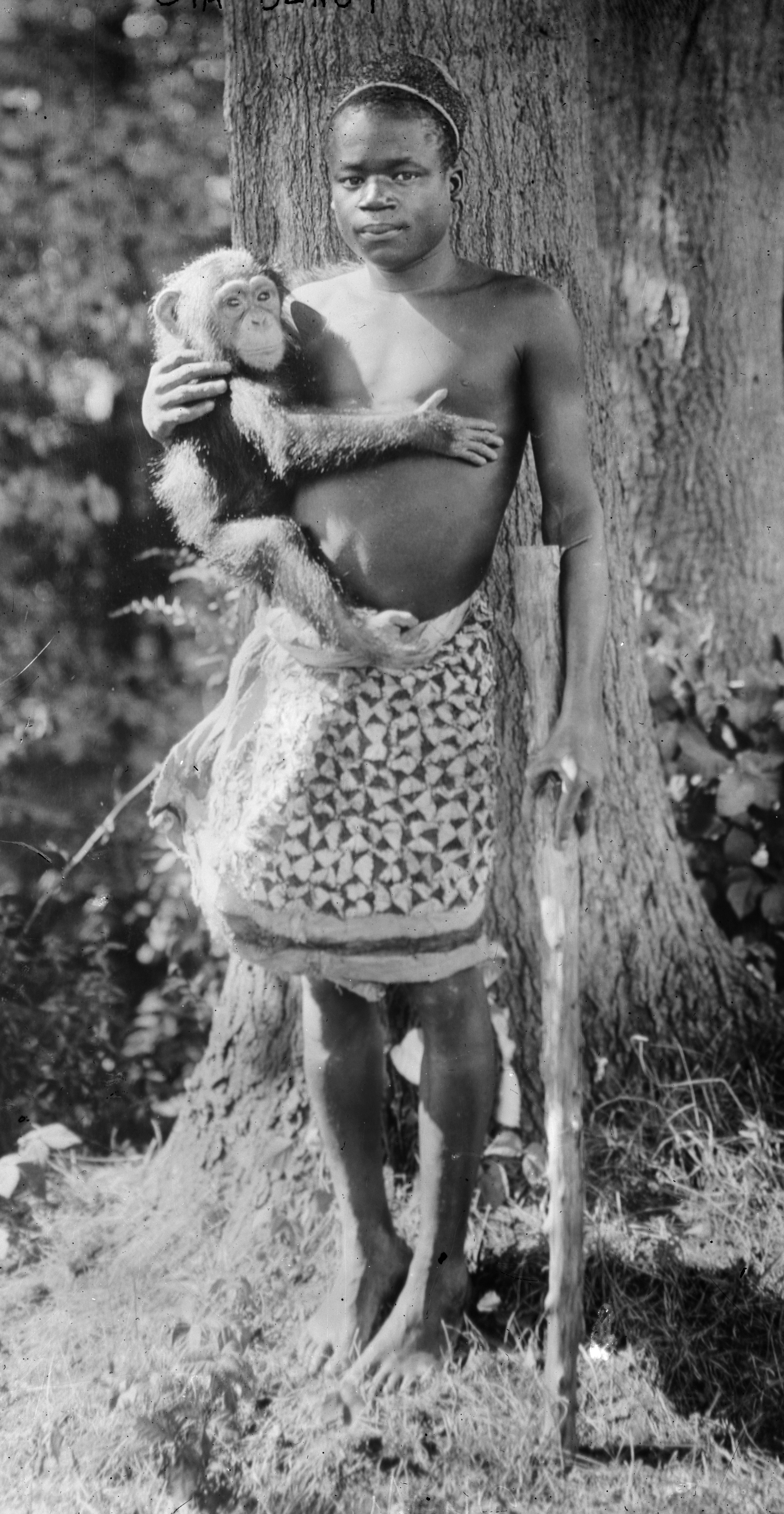
Ota Benga, a human exhibit, in 1906. Age, 23 years. Height, 4 feet 11 inches (150 cm). Weight, 103 pounds (47 kg). Brought from the Kasai River, Congo Free State, South Central Africa, by Dr. Samuel P. Verner. Exhibited each afternoon during September. – according to a sign outside the primate house at the Bronx Zoo, September 1906.

In 1896, to increase the number of visitors, the Cincinnati Zoo invited one hundred Sioux Native Americans to establish a village at the site. The Sioux lived at the zoo for three months.

One of the best-known examples in the United States was the exhibition of Congolese man Ota Benga at the Bronx Zoo in New York City in September 1906. Under the direction of New York Zoological Society president Madison Grant and zoo director William Temple Hornaday, Benga was displayed alongside chimpanzees, an orangutan named Dohong, and a parrot. He was labeled the "Missing Link".

The exhibit quickly drew protests from Black clergy and community leaders, who condemned it as racist and degrading, even as the display was popular with the general public. Following the public outcry, Hornaday closed the exhibit on 8 September 1906, after two days. Benga subsequently walked freely around the zoo grounds, where he was often followed by a crowd reportedly "howling, jeering and yelling".

==== St. Louis World's Fair ====
In 1904, over 1,100 Filipinos were displayed at the St. Louis World's Fair in association with the 1904 Summer Olympics. Following the Spanish-American War, the United States had just acquired new territories such as Guam, the Philippines, and Puerto Rico. The organizers of the World's Fair held "Anthropology Days" on August 12 and 13. Since the 1889 Paris Exposition, human zoos, as a key feature of world's fairs, functioned as demonstrations of anthropological notions of race, progress, and civilization. These goals were followed also at the 1904 World's Fair. Fourteen hundred indigenous people from Southeast Asia, the Pacific Islands, East Asia, Africa, the Middle East, South America and North America were displayed in anthropological exhibits that showed them in their natural habitats. Another 1600 indigenous people displayed their culture in other areas of the Louisiana Purchase Exposition (LPE), including on the fairgrounds and at the Model School, where American Indian boarding school students demonstrated their successful assimilation. The sporting event itself took place with the participation of about 100 paid indigenous men (no women participated in Anthropology Days, though some, notably the Fort Shaw Indian School girls basketball team, did compete in other athletic events at the LPE). Contests included "baseball throwing, shot put, running, broad jumping, weight lifting, pole climbing, and tugs-of-war before a crowd of approximately ten thousand". According to theorist Susan Brownell, world's fairs – with their inclusion of human zoos – and the Olympics were a logical fit at this time, as they "were both linked to an underlying cultural logic that gave them a natural affinity". Also, one of the original intentions of Anthropology Days was to create publicity for the official Olympic events.

While Anthropology Days were not officially part of the Olympics program, they were closely associated with each other at the time, and in history—Brownell notes that even today historians still debate as to which of the LPE events were the "real" Olympic Games. Additionally, almost all of the 400 athletic events were referred to as "Olympian," and the opening ceremony was held in May with dignitaries in attendance, though the official Olympic program did not begin until July 1. Also, as previously noted, one of the original intentions of Anthropology Days was to create publicity for the official Olympic events.

The exhibitions of the World's Fair inspired US military officer Truman Hunt to start his own human zoo of "Head-Hunting Igorrotes" in Brooklyn. Reports of questionable living conditions for its Filipino performers led the US Federal government to investigate Hunt's exhibition, and it was eventually shut it down after Hunt was found guilty of wage theft from the performers.

=== United Kingdom ===
In 1909, the infrastructure of the 1908 Scottish National Exhibition in Edinburgh was used to construct the new Marine Gardens to the coast near Edinburgh at Portobello.

At Bradford's Great Exhibition held in Lister Park in 1904, a Somali community of 57 men, women and children took part in the exhibition as a "living" colonial display. An exhibition in the city's Cartwright Hall in 2026 recalled their participation in the exhibition and explored the ethical issues involved in offering such a display and interpreting it a century later.

In 1925, a display at Belle Vue Zoo in Manchester, England, was entitled "Cannibals" and featured black Africans in supposedly native dress.

In August 2005, London Zoo displayed four human volunteers wearing fig leaves (and bathing suits) for four days.

In August 2014, as part of the Edinburgh International Festival, South African theatre-maker Brett Bailey's show Exhibit B was performed in the Playfair Library Hall, University of Edinburgh, and then in September at The Barbican in London. This explored the nature of Human Zoos and raised much controversy both amongst the performers and the audiences.

== Backlash ==
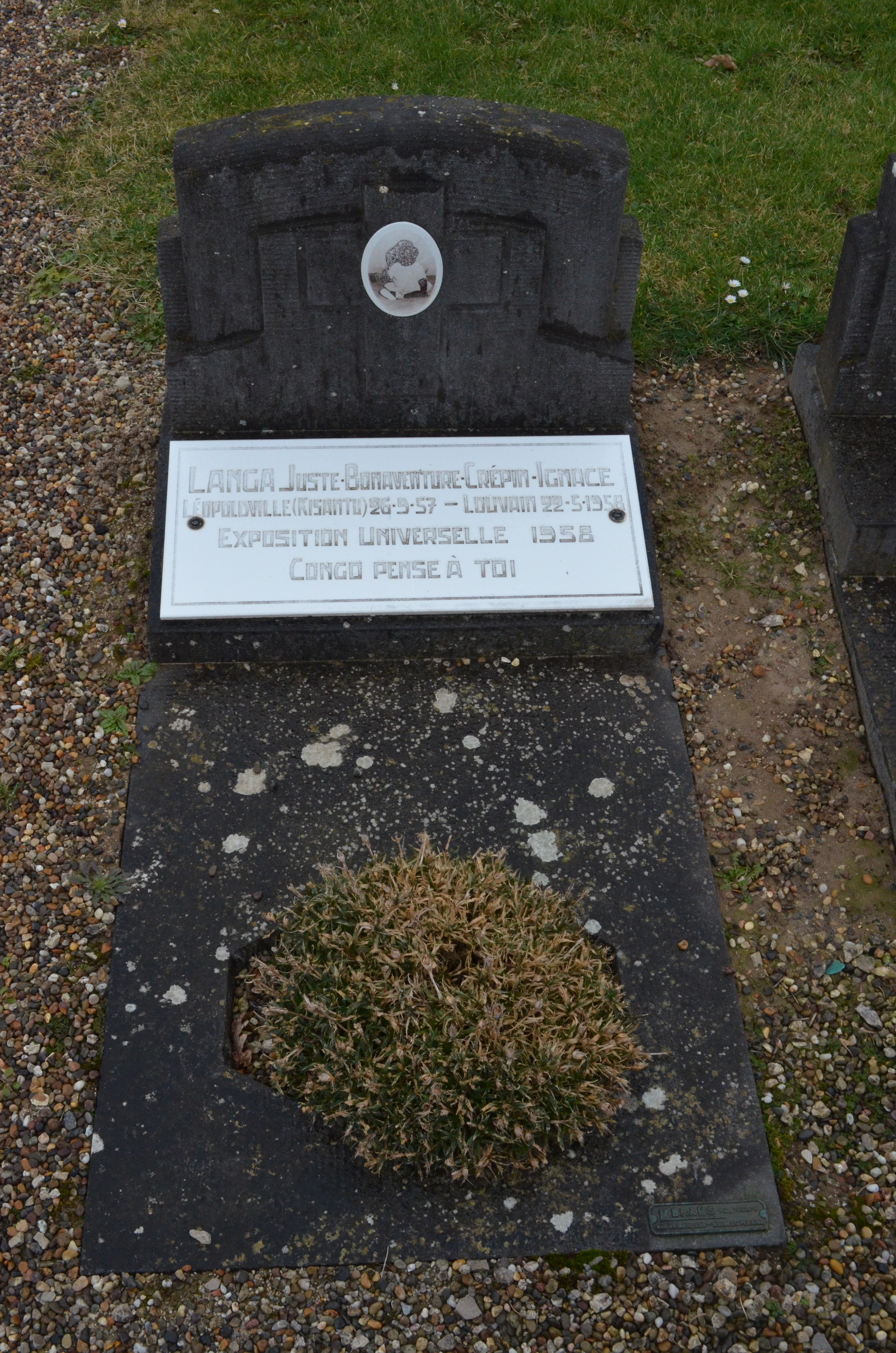
Tomb of Juste Bonaventure Langa, in the Tervuren cemetery. Born on 26 September 1957 in Leopoldville (Kinshasa), he died on 22 May 1958 in Leuven, during the Expo 58. On his grave is a marble plaque bearing the inscription "Exposition Universelle 1958 / Congo pense à toi".

According to The New York Times, although "few expressed audible objection to the sight of a human being in a cage with monkeys as companions", controversy erupted as black clergymen in the city took great offense. "Our race, we think, is depressed enough, without exhibiting one of us with the apes", said the Reverend James H. Gordon, superintendent of the Howard Colored Orphan Asylum in Brooklyn. "We think we are worthy of being considered human beings, with souls."

New York City Mayor George B. McClellan Jr. refused to meet with the clergymen, drawing the praise of Hornaday, who wrote to him: "When the history of the Zoological Park is written, this incident will form its most amusing passage."

As the controversy continued, Hornaday remained unapologetic, insisting his only intention was to put on an ethnological exhibition. In another letter, he said that he and Grant—who ten years later would publish the racist tract The Passing of the Great Race—considered it "imperative that the society should not even seem to be dictated to" by the black clergymen.

1903 saw one of the first widespread protests against human zoos, at the "Human Pavilion" of an exposition in Osaka, Japan. The exhibition of Koreans and Okinawans in "primitive" housing incurred protests from the governments of Korea and Okinawa, and a Formosan woman wearing Chinese dress angered a group of Chinese students studying abroad in Tokyo. An Ainu schoolteacher was made to exhibit himself in the zoo to raise money for his schoolhouse, as the Japanese government refused to pay. The fact that the schoolteacher made eloquent speeches and fundraised for his school while wearing traditional dress confused the spectators. An anonymous front-page column in a Japanese magazine condemned these examples and the "Human Pavilion" in total, calling it inhumane to exhibit people as spectacles.

In 2018, a poster exhibition titled Putting People on Display, toured a number of universities in Scotland, showing original advertisements and posters promoting human exhibitions. Additional posters were added to a selection from the French ACHAC's exhibition, Human Zoos: the Invention of the Savage, in relation to the Scottish dimension in hosting such shows.

== In popular culture ==
In the 2008 The Curious Case of Benjamin Button (film), Button befriends a Pygmy named Ngunda Oti who was formerly held at the Philadelphia Zoological Park.

The Lone Ranger (2013 film) is narrated by an elderly Tonto who is on display in a San Francisco museum.

== See also ==
- Abraham Ulrikab – Inuk man and his family
- Cultural appropriation
- Living museum
  - Living history museum
- Natural state
- Noble savage
- Orientalism
- Othering
- Primitivism
- Racial fetishism
- Reality television
- Romantic racism
- Scramble for Africa
- Wild Australia Show
- Wild man

== Films ==
- The Couple in the Cage, 1997. Dir. Coco Fusco and Paula Eredia: 30 min.
- Régis Warnier, the film Man to Man. 2005.
- "From Bella Coola to Berlin". 2006. Dir. Barbara Hager. 48 minutes. Broadcaster – Bravo! Canada.
- "Indianer in Berlin: Hagenbeck's Volkerschau". 2006. Dir. Barbara Hager. Broadcaster – Discovery Germany Geschichte Channel.
- Alexander C. T. Geppert, Fleeting Cities. Imperial Expositions in Fin-de-Siècle Europe (Basingstoke: Palgrave Macmillan, 2010).
- Sadiah Qureshi, Peoples on Parade: Exhibitions, Empire and Anthropology in Nineteenth-Century Britain (2011).
- "Human zoos. The invention of the savage", Dir. Pascal Blanchard, Gilles Boëtsch, Nanette Jacomijn Snoep – exhibition catalogue – Actes Sud (2011)
- Sauvages. Au cœur des zoos humains, Dir. Pascal Blanchard, Bruno Victor-Pujebet – 90 minutes – Bonne Pioche production & Archipel (2018)
- Human Zoos: America's Forgotten History of Scientific Racism, Dir. John G. West (2019)

== Bibliography ==
- Abbattista, Guido, Ethnic Expositions in Italy, 1880 to 1940. Humans on Exhibition (London-New York: Routledge, 2024)
- Ankerl, Guy. Coexisting Contemporary Civilizations: Arabo-Muslim, Bharatai, Chinese, and Western, Geneva, INU Press, 2000, ISBN 2881550045.
- Conklin, Alice L., and Ian Christopher Fletcher. European Imperialism, 1830–1930: Climax and Contradiction. Boston, MA: Wadsworth Cengage Learning, 1999. ISBN 0395903858
- Dreesbach, Anne. Colonial Exhibitions: 'Völkerschauen' and the Display of the 'Other', European History Online, Mainz: Institute of European History, 2012.
- Grant, Kevin. A Civilised Savagery: Britain and the New Slaveries in Africa, 1884–1926. New York; Oxfordshire, England: Routledge, 2005.
- Lewis, R. Barry. Understanding humans : introduction to physical anthropology and archaeology. Belmont, Calif. Wadsworth Cengage Learning. 2010.
- Oliveira, Cinthya. Human Rights & Exhibitions, 1789–1989, Journal of Museum Ethnography, no. 29, 2016, pp. 71–94.
- Penny, H. Glenn. Objects of Culture : Ethnology and Ethnographic Museums in Imperial Germany, The University of North Carolina Press, 2002.
- Porter, Louis, Porter, A. N., and Louis, William Roger. The Oxford History of the British Empire. Volume III, The Nineteenth Century. Oxford: Oxford UP, 1999. Oxford History of the British Empire. Web.
- Qureshi, Sadiah. Robert Gordon Latham, Displayed Peoples, and the Natural History of Race: 1854–1866, The Historical Journal, vol. 54, no. 1, 2011, pp. 143–166.
- Rothfels, Nigel. Savages and Beasts : The Birth of the Modern Zoo, Johns Hopkins University Press, 2002.
- Schofield, Hugh. Human Zoos: When Real People Were Exhibits, BBC News, 2011.
- India Andaman Jarawa Tribe in 'Shocking' Tourist Video, BBC News, 2012.
