= Philippines Exposition (1887) =

Exhibition held in Madrid in 1887

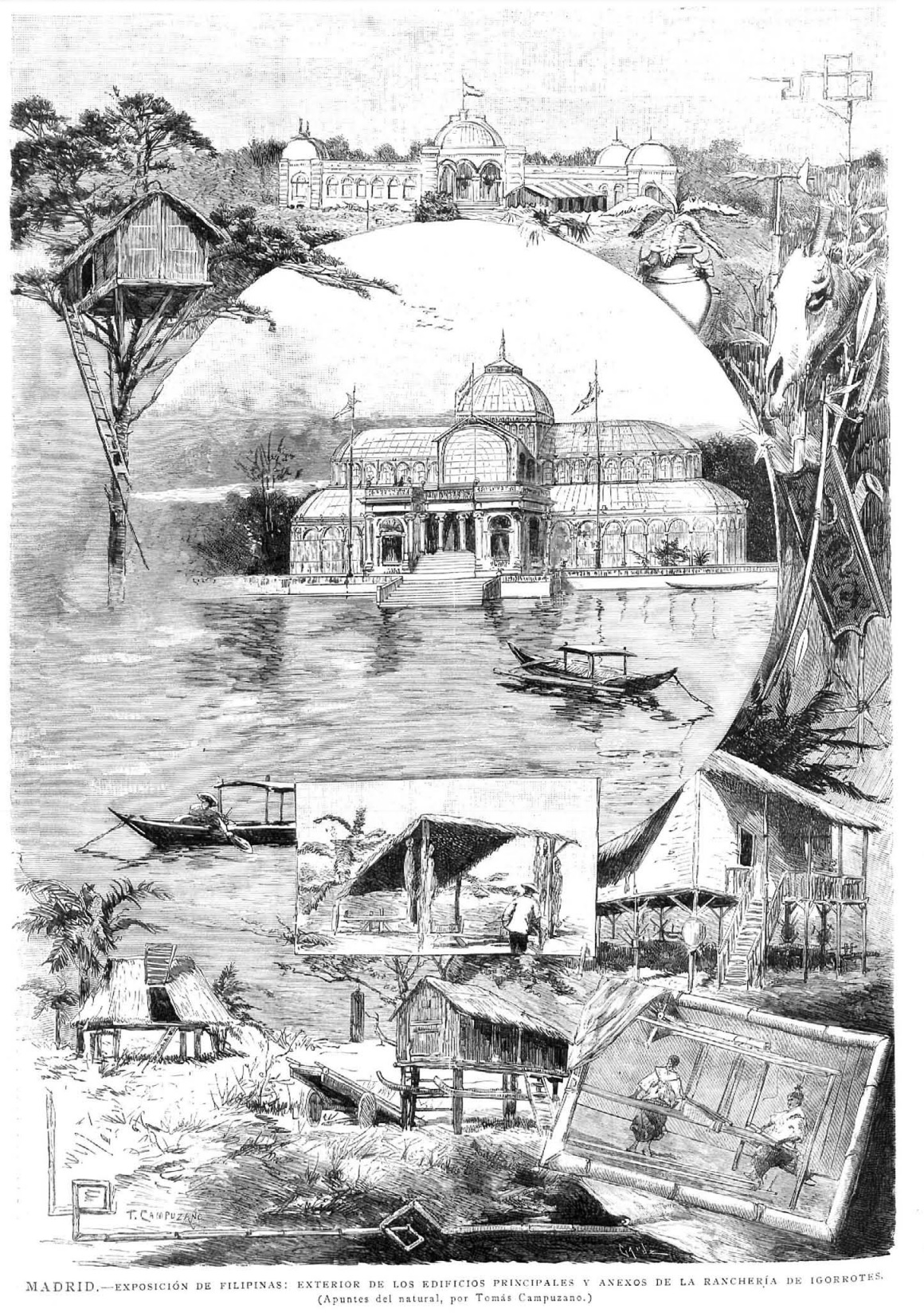
- Sketch of the exhibition by Tomás Campuzano, published in La Ilustración Española y Americana.
- Native name: Exposición General de las Islas Filipinas
- Date: 30 June – 30 October 1887
- Venue: Pabellón Central, Pabellón de Cristal
- Location: El Retiro, Madrid, Spain
- Type: Colonial exhibition
- Theme: Philippines

The Philippines Exposition (Spanish: Exposición de las Filipinas; full name: Exposición General de las Islas Filipinas) was a colonial exhibition held in the main park in Madrid, the Parque del Buen Retiro, in 1887 in order to boost commercial and economic relations between the archipelago of the Philippines and the metropolis. The Palacio de Cristal, which was erected for the exhibition, survives to the present day and is included in the World Heritage Site "Paseo del Prado and Buen Retiro, a landscape of Arts and Sciences".

Controversially, people from the Philippines were put on display in settings which were criticised at the time by Filipino nationalist José Rizal and in recent years have been characterised as a human zoo.

== History ==
The exhibition was inspired by the colonial exhibition held in 1883 in Amsterdam, the Netherlands. The organizing committee in mainland Spain, presided by Víctor Balaguer (Overseas Minister), was tasked with receiving, classifying and studying all the items sent by the Central Committee in the Philippines. 8 sections were created:

- 1st. Naturaleza en los territorios españoles en la Oceanía ('Nature in the Spanish territories in Oceania')
- 2nd. Población ('Population')
- 3rd. Ejército e institutos armados auxiliares de la Administración (' Army and auxiliary armed institutes of the Administration')
- 4th. Marina de Guerra ('Navy')
- 5th. Geografía botánica del Archipiélago, su flora, la forestal y fauna ('Botanical geography of the Archipelago, its flora, forest and fauna')

The Palacio de Cristal was designed to show live plants from the Philippines which were shipped from Manila in the care of Sebastián Vidal, the director of its botanical garden.

- 6th. Agricultura, horticultura y riqueza pecuaria ('Agriculture, horticulture and livestock wealth')
- 7th. Industria, movimiento, comercial, tráfico ('Industry, commercial movement, traffic')
- 8th. Cultura general, instrucción pública, ciencias y artes ('General culture, public instruction, sciences and arts').

Upon the advertising of the project, the latter was met by racist commentary from sectors of the local press. The main venues were the Palacio de Velázquez and the Palacio de Cristal.

Insofar the exhibition aimed for a holistic representation of the Philippines, natives from different ethnic groups, fauna, flora and Philippine craftmanship were brought to Madrid. 43 natives (naturales) arrived to Madrid to be exhibited (reportedly including "some igorots, one negrito, several tagalog, chamorros, carolinos, Jolo moros and a group of visayans"). Another 12 natives arrived later to Madrid. The intellectual author behind the exhibition of the naturales was Pedro Payo, Archbishop of Manila. The physiognomy of the natives was studied and they were measured up. The natives were distributed in two villages: the "ranchería igorrote", destined to display "uncivilized" natives and the so-called "Pueblo indio de Santiago", for the Christianized and "civilized" ones (indios). Locations outside the two villages displayed female indias weaving fabrics and rolling cigars.

It was inaugurated on 30 June 1887 in El Retiro by the Queen Regent Maria Christina, accompanied by the infanta Isabel. It closed on 30 October 1887.
