= Truman Hunt =

American military officer and showman

Truman Knight Hunt
- Hunt posing with one of his "Igorrotes", taken circa 1904.
- Born: 1866; Baldwin, Iowa
- Died: February 15, 1916 (aged 49–50); Cedar Rapids, Iowa
- Occupations: Showman, snake oil salesman
- Known for: Running a human zoo
- Spouse(s): Sallie Ann Gallagher (m. 1904)
- Military career
- Branch: United States Army: Army Medical Corps
- Service years: 1896–1904
- Conflicts: Spanish–American War; Philippine–American War

Truman Knight Hunt (1866 – February 16, 1916) was an American military officer, medical doctor and showman. In 1904, he put on a traveling human zoo show performed by Filipinos, which was eventually shut down by the United States Federal Government due to wage theft.

== Biography ==
=== Early life and career ===
Truman Knight Hunt was born in 1866 in Baldwin, Iowa to Josiah Knight Hunt (1840–1899) and Eunice Melissa Cobb (1847–1916). After working a number of jobs with no luck in securing a permanent trade, Hunt enlisted into the United States Army, where he was assigned to the Medical Corps as a hospital steward. Following the Spanish–American War, Hunt was sent to the Philippine Islands, where he was appointed as an administrator in the province of Bontoc.

=== Showman career ===
In 1904, after his tenure in Bontoc had ended, Hunt decided to enter the entertainment business by putting on a human zoo exhibition. Hiring a number of locals in Bontoc, Hunt brought them back with him to the United States, where he set up his exhibition at Luna Park in Brooklyn. Billed as "Head-Hunting Igorrotes", the actors were forced to dress half-naked and perform mock tribal rituals for public audiences. Because there was a belief that people in the Philippines ate dog meat, stray dogs were taken from Brooklyn's dog pounds to be killed and eaten by the performers as part of the show.

Though Hunt's show was initially extremely popular among show-goers and even gained some international acclaim, Hunt would soon draw criticism for the alleged mistreatment of his performers. During an exhibition in Chicago, it was reported that Hunt's Igorrotes "were crammed into three small A-frame tents in a muddy scrap of land underneath the trestlework of the roller coaster." Two of Hunt's performers died on the road. As a result of these incidents, the federal government assigned federal agent Frederick Barker to investigate the matter. Hunt attempted to flee to Canada with his performers, though by October 1906 he was found by authorities and arrested. During the investigation it was found that Hunt, despite having promised pay of $15 a month to his performers, had nonetheless withheld $9,600 in wages from the tribespeople, and had often physically assaulted them to rob them of their money. However, while his performers were allowed to return to the Philippines, Hunt's charges were eventually dropped.

=== Later life and death ===
Following his acquittal by the government, Hunt moved back to Iowa with his wife, Sallie Ann Gallagher, whom he had married bigamously. He became a snake oil salesman and unsuccessfully attempted to start a family, with three of his four children dying before the age of six. Hunt died aged 49 on February 16, 1916, in Cedar Rapids, Iowa, and was buried in an unmarked grave.
