= Maximo and Bartola =

Salvadoran performers

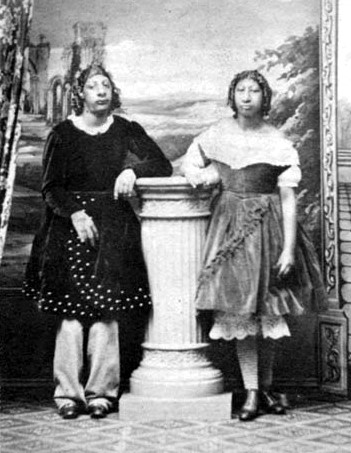
Maximo and Bartola

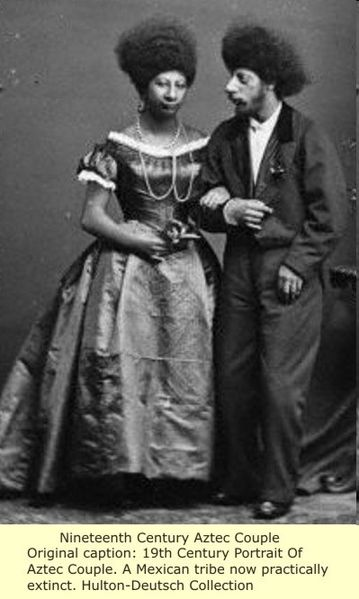
Maximo and Bartola at their staged "wedding" in 1867, an attempt to garner more publicity

Máximo and Bartola (also known as Máximo Váldez Núñez and Bartola Velásquez respectively) were the stage names of two Salvadoran siblings both with microcephaly and intellectual disability who were exhibited in human zoos in the 19th century. Originally from near Usulután, El Salvador, the siblings were given by their mother to a merchant who promised he would take them to Grenada to be educated and exhibited. They then went through several guardians afterwards. They were eventually billed as "Aztec Children" and an elaborate story was constructed of how they were found in the temple of a lost Mesoamerican city by the name of Iximaya. They toured the U.S. and Europe, appearing before various regents and dignitaries.

== Medical condition ==
Máximo and Bartola were born with microcephaly, a congenital neurological condition in which the head develops to a smaller than typical size. Both also had intellectual disability.

During their lifetimes, showmen promoted Máximo and Bartola as the "Aztec Children" and presented them as members of a lost Aztec civilization, rather than as Salvadoran siblings with a congenital disability.

== Guardians ==
Little is known about Máximo and Bartola's childhood before they entered public exhibition in the late 1840s. During their childhood and exhibition careers, they were under the care of several guardians who managed their public appearances. Contemporary newspaper accounts gave differing descriptions of how Máximo and Bartola first came into the care of showmen.

According to testimony given during a custody dispute in 1852, Máximo and Bartola's parents entrusted the siblings to the merchant Raymondo Selva near the village of Jacotal, in the San Miguel Department of what is now El Salvador. Selva testified that he had agreed to take Máximo and Bartola to Grenada, where they would receive an education while also being exhibited. A newspaper account published two years later instead claimed that their mother had exchanged the siblings to Selva for gold.

After Selva was detained by authorities in Grenada, Máximo and Bartola passed into the care of Selva's brother-in-law, Selazar. Selazar later formed a partnership with the American showman John S. Addison and the interpreter Pedro Salva before taking the siblings to the United States. Following his release, Selva testified that he returned to El Salvador, met with Máximo and Bartola's parents, and promised to recover them.

Máximo and Bartola's guardianship became the subject of a legal dispute in Philadelphia later in 1852. J. M. Morris challenged Selva's account and claimed to be the siblings' lawful guardian. The dispute was settled in December, when custody of Máximo and Bartola was awarded to Morris. As part of the settlement, Morris was ordered to pay Selva $13,000.

By July 1853, Máximo and Bartola were under the guardianship of a man named Anderson. They later returned to Morris's care and continued touring throughout the United States and Europe under his management.

== Career ==
Maximo and Bartola were first exhibited in the late 1840s. In 1850, they were described as being "about ten years of age" and "about eight years of age" respectively, and under the care of a Mr. Knox.

They toured Washington, D.C., and visited President Millard Fillmore at the White House. By July 1853, they were under the guardianship of a man named Anderson, and were taken to Europe to be exhibited before Queen Victoria.

== Marketing and public image ==
Throughout their exhibition careers, showmen promoted Máximo and Bartola as the "Aztec Children", despite their origins near Usulután, in what is now El Salvador. They constructed an elaborate fictional history claiming that the siblings had been discovered in the ruins of a lost Aztec city called Iximaya, where they were said to be the last surviving members of a vanished civilization. Although details of the story changed over time and varied between publications, the central claim remained the same: Máximo and Bartola were presented as the surviving descendants of a lost civilization rather than as Salvadoran siblings with microcephaly.

Throughout the United States and Europe, newspaper advertisements, exhibition notices, and press reports emphasized the siblings' small stature and unusual appearance in support of the fabricated narrative. Their story attracted the attention of newspapers, physicians, and naturalists, who published competing explanations of their origins.

After examining the siblings in London in 1853, biologist Richard Owen rejected claims that they belonged to a lost Aztec race and instead concluded that they were of mixed Spanish, African, and Indigenous American ancestry. Owen's conclusions generated further discussion about the siblings' origins, but exhibitors continued promoting Máximo and Bartola as the "Aztec Children".

Promoters also incorporated the siblings' personal lives into their public image. On 7 January 1867, while touring in London, Máximo and Bartola, who are identified by modern historians as siblings, legally married under the names Máximo Valdez Núñez and Bartola Velásquez. Contemporary newspapers reported the ceremony as a public spectacle.

== Death ==
The circumstances of Máximo and Bartola's deaths are uncertain, and published accounts differ.

On 14 November 1867, the Daily Phoenix reported that Máximo had died three days earlier, on 11 November, while touring with Dan Castello's Circus in Charleston, South Carolina. According to the newspaper, he was buried in Magnolia Cemetery. The report did not mention Bartola or indicate whether she continued performing after Máximo's reported death.

Later historical accounts differ from the newspaper report. Robert Bogdan wrote that Máximo and Bartola continued touring together as the "Aztec Children" into the late nineteenth century.
