= Santa Cruz de Mudela =

- Municipality
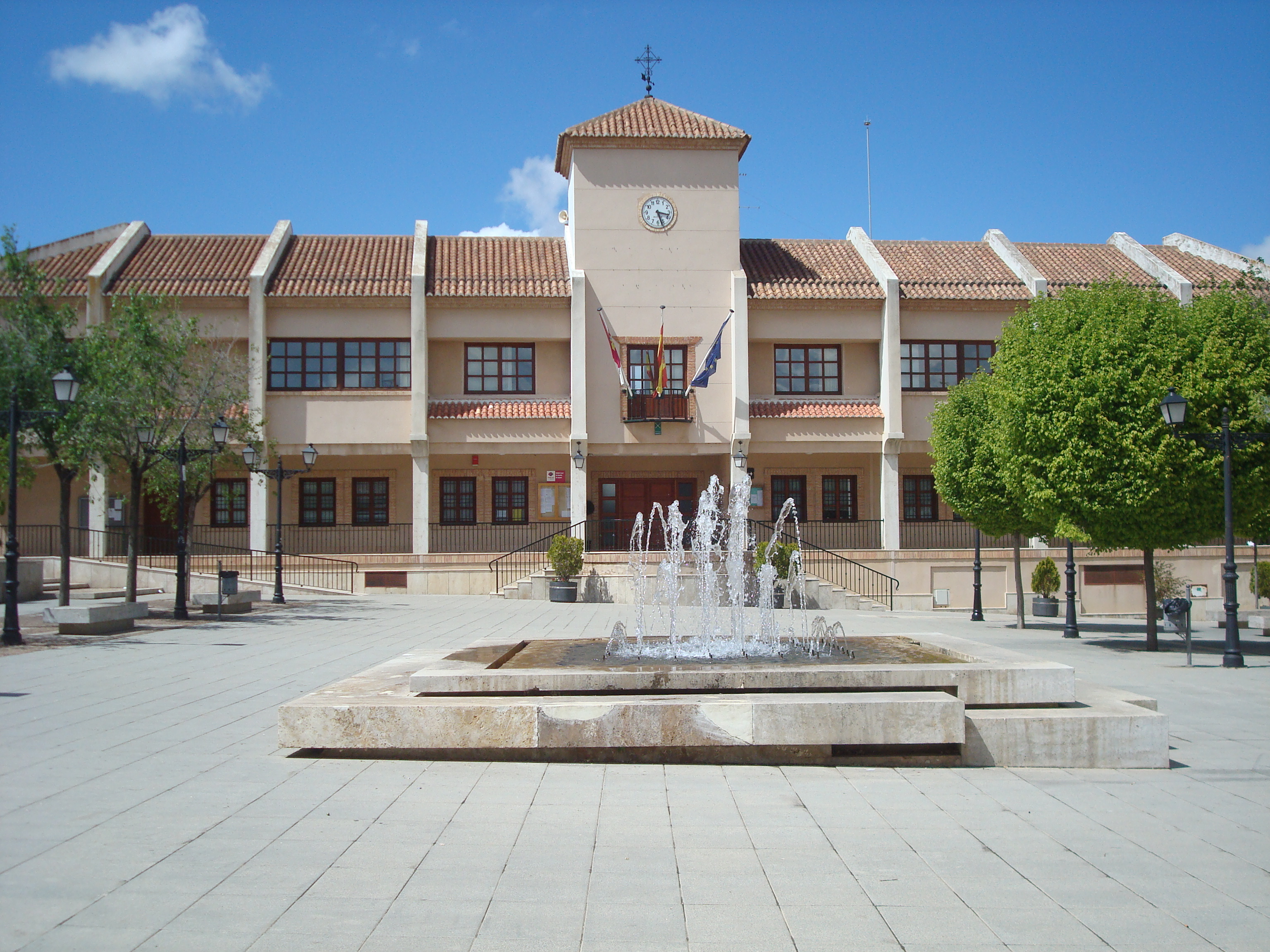

- Coat of arms

- Location in Spain
- Coordinates: 38°38′0″N 3°28′0″W
- Country: Spain
- Autonomous community: Castile-La Mancha
- Province: Ciudad Real
- Comarca: Manserja
- Commonwealth: Manserja
- Founded: 13th century

Government
  - Alcalde: Manuel Sáez Laguna (2007) (PVISCM)

Area
  - Total: 134.60 km^{2} (51.97 sq mi)
- Elevation: 732 m (2,402 ft)

Population (2025-01-01)
  - Total: 3,881
  - Density: 28.83/km^{2} (74.68/sq mi)
- Demonym: Santacruceño
- Time zone: UTC+1 (CET)
  - Summer (DST): UTC+2 (CEST)
- Postal code: 13730
- Official language(s): Spanish

Santa Cruz de Mudela is a municipality of the Spanish Province of Ciudad Real located in the southeastern corner of the autonomous community Castilla–La Mancha.

== Geography ==
Santa Cruz de Mudela has a Mediterranean–Continental climate that consists of cold winters, warm summers, and little precipitation.

== History ==
=== The founding of Santa Cruz de Mudela ===
Various artifacts and remains dating back to the first half of the second millennium B. C. E. have been found in the northern parts of the Meadow of Medula and the lowlands of Jabalon. Additional archaeological evidence from the Cerro de las Cabezas dig further suggests that the region was an important settlement of the Iberian Oretan tribe between the 7th and 2nd centuries B. C. E.

In the following centuries, the region came to lie under the sphere of influence of a Roman, and later Visigothic, town near present-day Valdepeñas. The Roman legacy and influence in Santa Cruz are most evident in the region's wine culture and many vineyards.

After the sudden Moorish conquest of the Iberian Peninsula in the 8th century, Santa Cruz's wine and vineyards became less important in the new Arabic culture. The town lost much of its former regional economic clout and came to serve mainly as a grain depository for the region south of Toledo.

In 1212 C. E., after Alfonso VIII of Castile and the Order of Calatrava drove the Moors from Central Iberia, the townspeople relocated and established around the Good Well (situated in front of what was then a convent, but is now the barracks of the Civil Guard) the town center that exists today.

The name of the town itself, Santa Cruz de Mudela, dates back to the 13th century. Several different explanations of the origin exist, mixing historical fact, tradition, and legend. Oral tradition takes the "Holy Cross" (Santa Cruz) to be that which accompanied the Christians in their triumphant 1212 battle of Las Navas de Tolosa. More reliable sources suggest that the "Santa Cruz" in actuality refers to the crossroads located in the Meadow of Mudela (so called for its proximity to the pass of Muradal, one of the entrances to the Central Meseta through the Andalusian Plain).

=== Marquessate of Santa Cruz ===
On January 30, 1538, Don Álvaro the Elder bought off from Carlos I the towns of Santa Cruz de Mudela and Viso del Puerto (Muradal), under his own terms and along with civil and criminal jurisdiction, for 26,208,626 maravedíes (approx. $37,441,623 in 2021 U.S. Dollars)(for comparison, Ferdinand Magellan's epic voyage around the Earth, financed by Carlos I in 1518, cost 8,751,125 maravedis). Later his son, Don Álvaro de Bazán the Younger, became the first Marquis of Santa Cruz and built the palace and the Franciscanos Capuchinos convent, still constituted, as said above, in authentic benefactors of the town.

The lineage of the Bazán belongs to one of the twelve houses of Navarre and continues through the towns of Baztán, and in the vernacular language is called soy uno. Don Álvaro of Bazán was one of the most interesting historical figures from Spain of the 16th century. The illustrious Granadian, celebrated admiral of Felipe II, was named 'first marqués of Santa Cruz of Mudela, leader of the towns Viso and Valdepeñas, major commander of León, his majesty's advisor and general captain of the ocean sea and of the people during the war of the kingdom of Portugal.

=== The War of Independence and the Battle of Ocaña ===
On June 5, 1808, Napoleon Bonaparte's invasion of Spain suffered a reversal at the hands of peasants from Santa Cruz de Mudela. Of 700 French troops, 109 were killed and an additional 113 were taken prisoner. Throughout November 1808, Santa Cruz de Mudela served as the headquarters for the La Mancha Spanish army under the command of General Don Francisco de Eguía during preparations for the crucial Battle of Ocaña.

=== 19th century to present ===
The city became known during the 19th century for its sword and cutlery artisans, who forged steel blades of exceptional quality comparable to those of Toledo and Albacete.

== Landmarks and Monuments ==
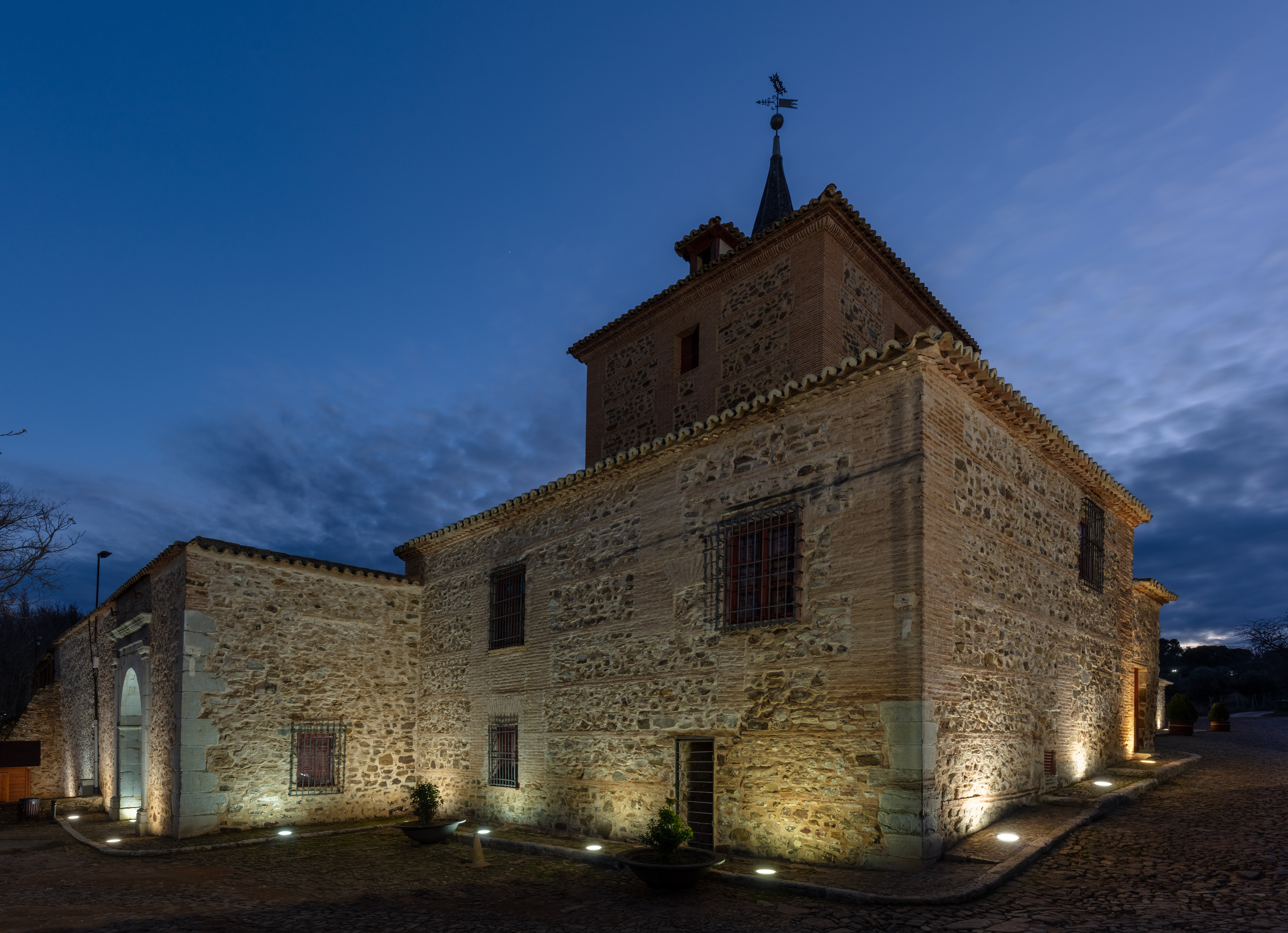
Sanctuary of Nuestra Señora de las Virtudes

- Plaza and Sanctuary of Nuestra Señora de las Virtudes
- Church of Nuestra Señora de la Asunción
- Church of San José
- Convent-School of Concepcionistas Misioneras de la Enseñanza

== Mayors of Santa Cruz from 1979 ==
- 1979 Juan Bustos (UCD)
- 1979 Juan Valverde (UCD)(by resignacion of Juan Bustos)
- 1983 Antonio Cobos (PSOE)
- 1987 Antonio Cobos (PSOE)
- 1989 José Antonio López Aranda (PSOE)
- 1991 José Antonio López Aranda (PSOE)
- 1995 José Antonio López Aranda (PSOE)
- 1999 José Antonio López Aranda (PSOE)
- 2003 José Antonio López Aranda (PSOE)
- 2007 Manuel Saéz Laguna (PVISCM)

== Notable residents ==
- D. Alfonso López de Molina y Martínez Domingo (born in 1600)
- P. Francisco González
- D. Máximo Laguna Villanueva, botanist and forester
- Dª. María del Rosario Laguna and Laguna
- D. Antonio Muñoz Patón
- D. Juan de Mata Castro y Cacho
- D. Antonio Senén Castro y Cacho
- D. Leandro Delgado Fernández
- D. Miguel Ramírez Lasala
- D. Miguel Laguna Campos
- D. José Casado Bustos
