= Lisbon Tropical Botanical Garden =

Botanical gardens in Portugal

Lisbon Tropical Botanical Garden (Jardim Botânico Tropical)
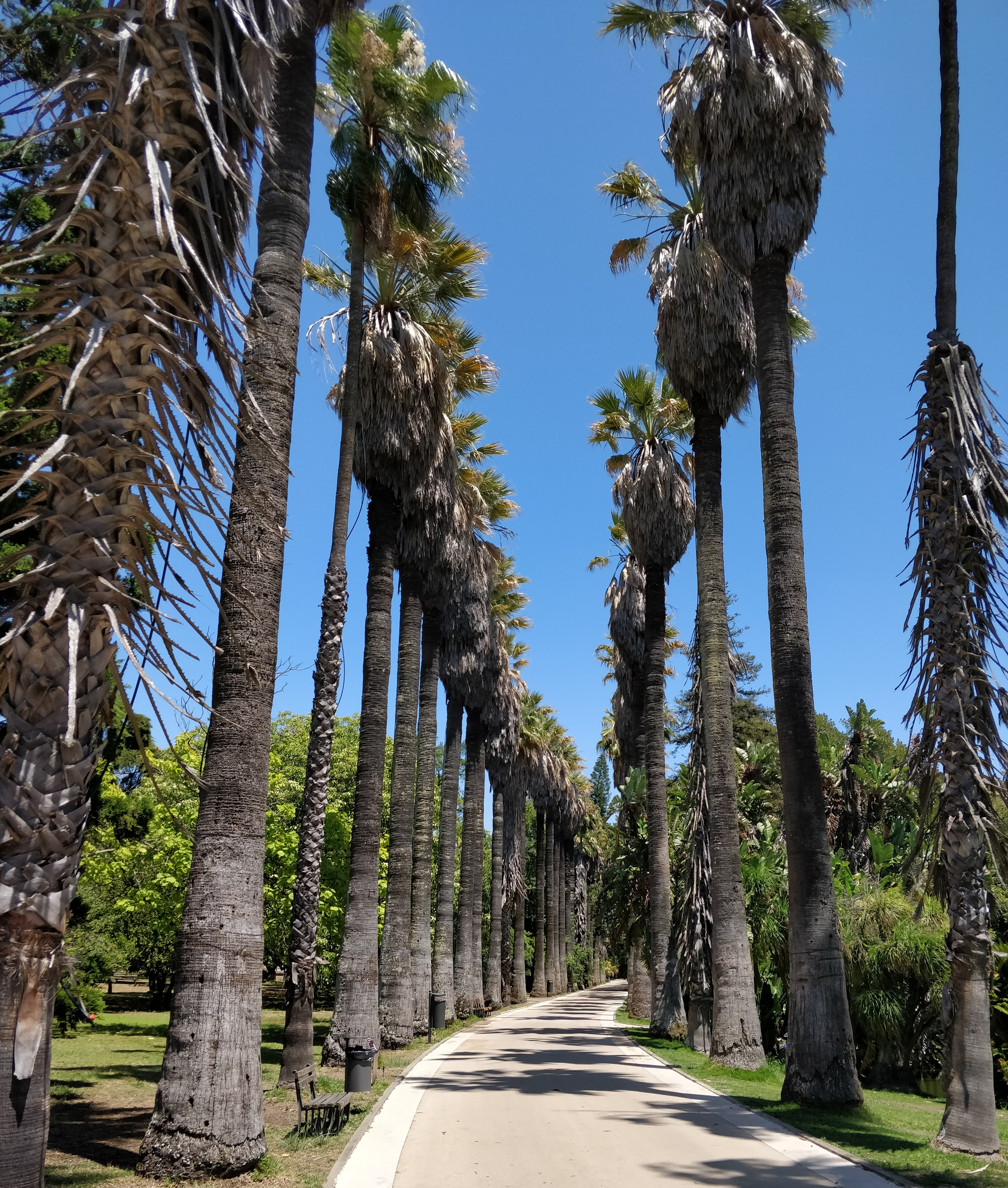
- Entrance to the Garden
- Interactive map of Lisbon Tropical Botanical Garden (Jardim Botânico Tropical)
- Location: Belém, Portugal
- Coordinates: 38.6984°N 9.2036°W
- Area: 7 hectares (17 acres)
- Opened: 1906
- Website: www.portaldojardim.com/pdj/2009/07/22/jardim-botanico-tropical-2/

The Lisbon Tropical Botanical Garden (Jardim Botânico Tropical) is located between the Jerónimos Monastery and the Belém Palace, the official residence of the Portuguese president, in Belém, a few kilometers to the west of the centre of Lisbon. It occupies a total area of about 7 hectares, including a botanical park of about 5 hectares that is open to the public. Containing tropical, sub-tropical and temperate plants, the Garden is classified as a National Monument. Since 2015, the Garden has been part of the University of Lisbon.

== History ==
The Garden was opened on 25 January 1906 following a Royal Decree issued by King Carlos. This was done in the context of the organization of agricultural services and training for Portugal's colonies and the Garden mainly contains species found in Angola, Cape Verde, East Timor, Guinea-Bissau, Macau, Mozambique, and São Tomé and Príncipe. At the time it was known as the Colonial Garden and was initially installed in greenhouses belonging to the Count of Farrôbo and on adjacent lands, which are now part of the Lisbon Zoo. The Garden was transferred to its present location in 1912. The main greenhouse was built in 1914, in iron and glass, according to the practice of the time. It contains species that go back to the time the Garden was first founded. In 1947, two other greenhouses were added, allowing three different temperatures to be maintained.

The Garden was planned as a centre for the study of tropical plants, as a space for collecting information on agriculture in Portugal's colonies, and as a centre for promoting relations with similar institutions with a view to exchanging plant material. It was also envisaged as a repository of technical knowledge for government officers working in agriculture in the colonies. In 1940 it played an important role in the Portuguese World Exhibition, hosting the "Colonial Section". At this time the Oriental Garden was established, inspired by the then colony of Macau, with the entrance being through a replica of an arch in Macau. Several other buildings in the Botanical Garden were also constructed at this time, including the "Colonial Restaurant". Fourteen busts of African and Asian people, by the sculptor Manuel de Oliveira, were also installed. As part of the exhibition, members of a tribe from the Bissagos Islands of Guinea-Bissau were kept on an island in a lake in the Garden, effectively being a human zoo. A live lion was also displayed in the Garden.

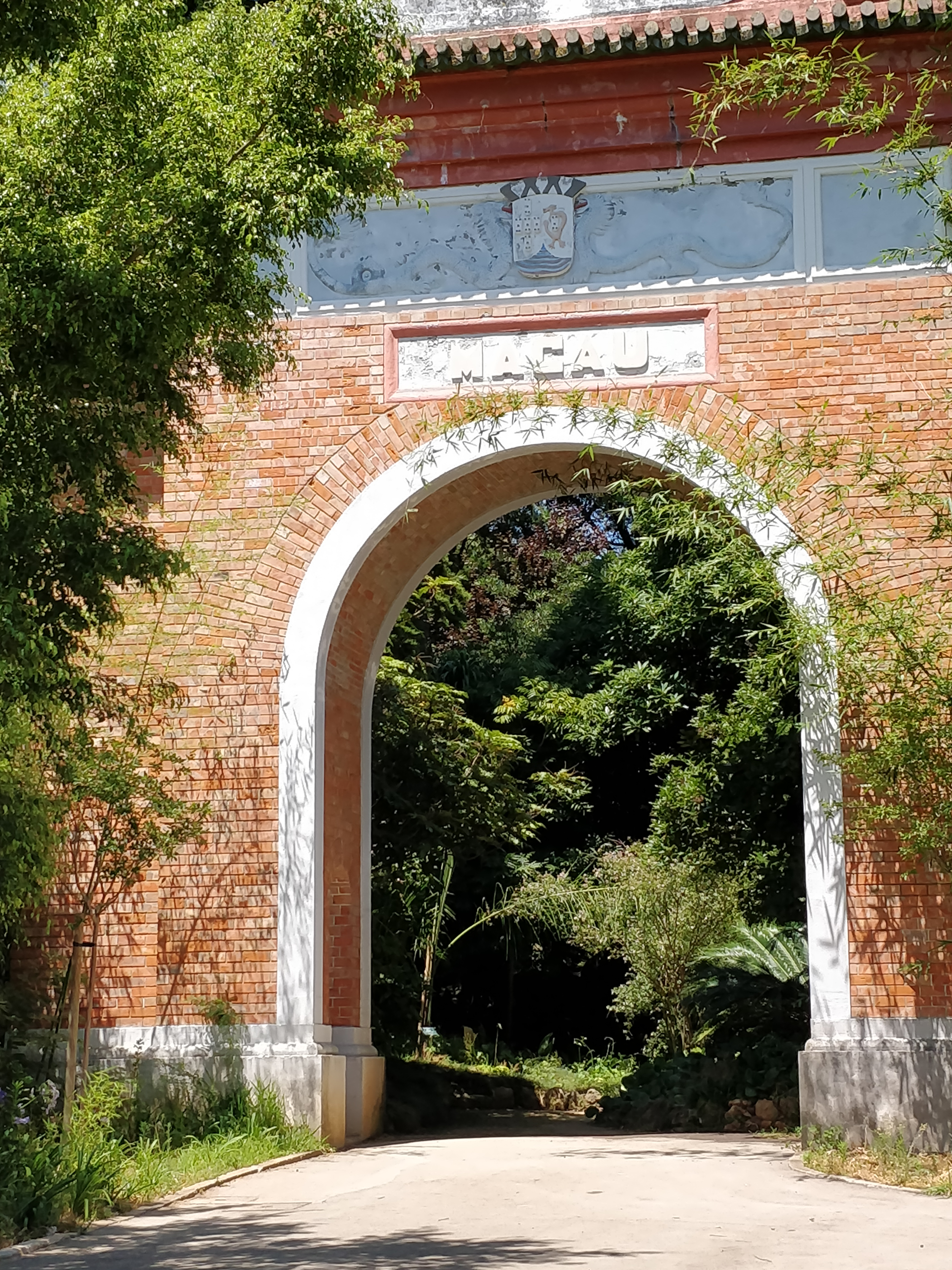
The Macau Gate

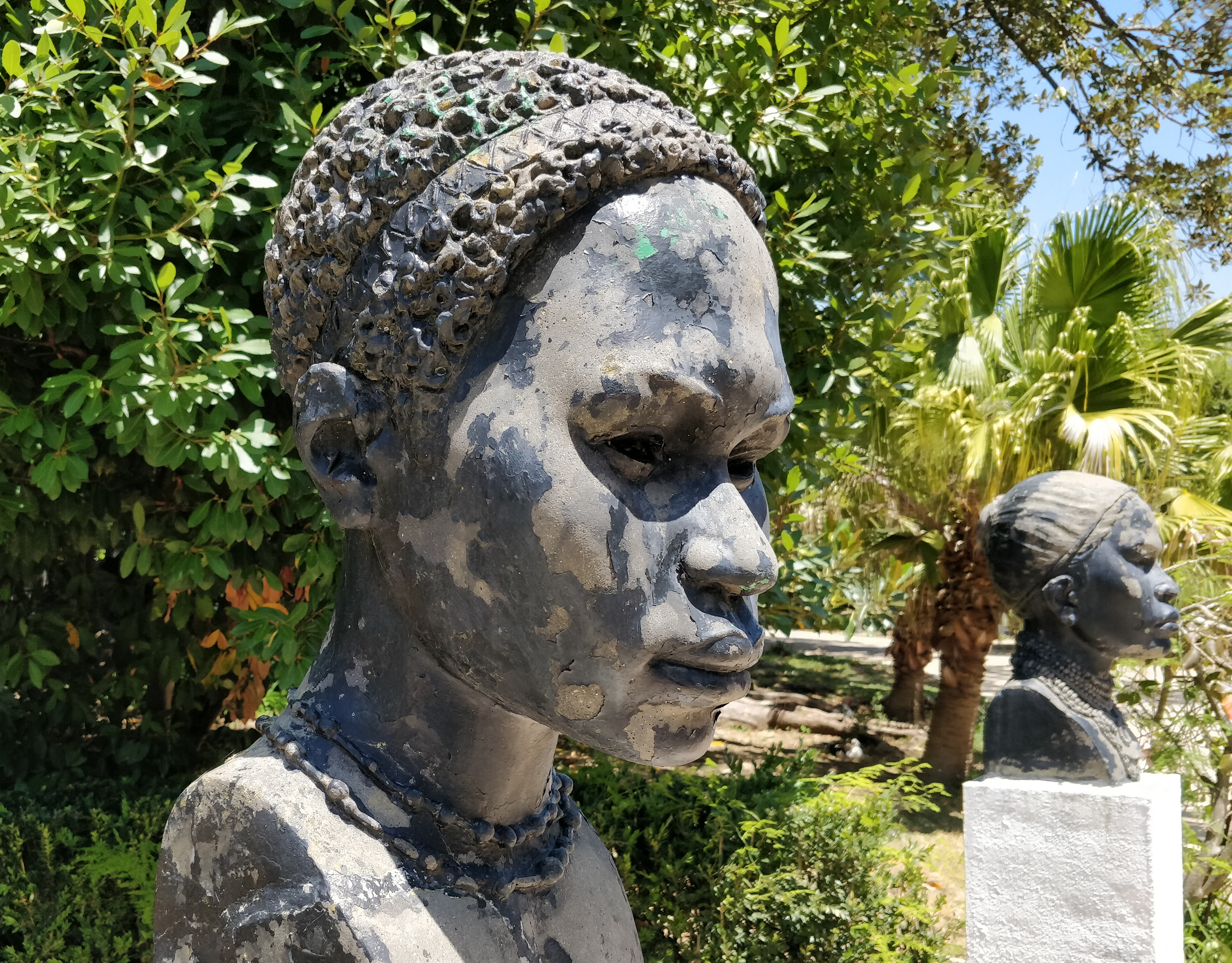
Two of the busts by Manuel de Oliveira

In 1944, the Garden merged with the Colonial Agricultural Museum to form the Colonial Agricultural Garden and Museum. In 1951, it was renamed as the Overseas Agricultural Garden and Museum, and in 1974 became part of the Institute for Tropical Scientific Research (IICT), changing its name to the Tropical Agricultural Museum-Garden (JMAT). Following the overthrow of the authoritarian Estado Novo government in 1974, most of Portugal's colonies rapidly achieved independence but the Garden continued to operate with the mandate to "develop and ensure the maintenance of collections of live tropical and subtropical plants ………. with up-to-date classification and cataloguing, which constitute material for study and teaching".

In order to support the IICT's management in promoting and carrying out activities in the Garden, the League of Friends of the Tropical Botanical Garden was created in 2005 as a non-profit association that aims to raise additional funds. In 2007, the Garden was classified as a National Monument. In 2015, it became part of the University of Lisbon, after the merger of the IICT with that university. In January 2019, the garden was closed for rehabilitation works, being reopened in January 2020. These were the first major rehabilitation works since the 1940s. At the north of the Garden is the Palace of the Counts of Calheta, which belonged to that family until it was acquired by King João V in 1726. This houses the research laboratories and the Tropical Museum of Lisbon, which has yet to be reopened.

== Collection ==
The Tropical Botanical Garden contains around 600 species. They are grouped as:

- Tropical trees and shrubs, such as Melaleuca lanceolata, Araucaria bidwillii, and Ficus macrophylla from Australia; Ficus sycomorus from East Africa, Ficus religiosa from Asia; Sequoia sempervirens, Cinnamomum burmanii, Eucommia ulmoides, Ginkgo biloba, Pittosporum tobira, Eugenia uniflora, and Aleurites moluccanus.
- Tropical plants of economic interest, including guava (Psidium guajava), pecan (Carya illioinensis), jujube (Ziziphus jujuba), Syzygium jambos, macadamia (Macadamia tetraphylla), avocado (Persea americana), and custard apple (Annona cherimola).

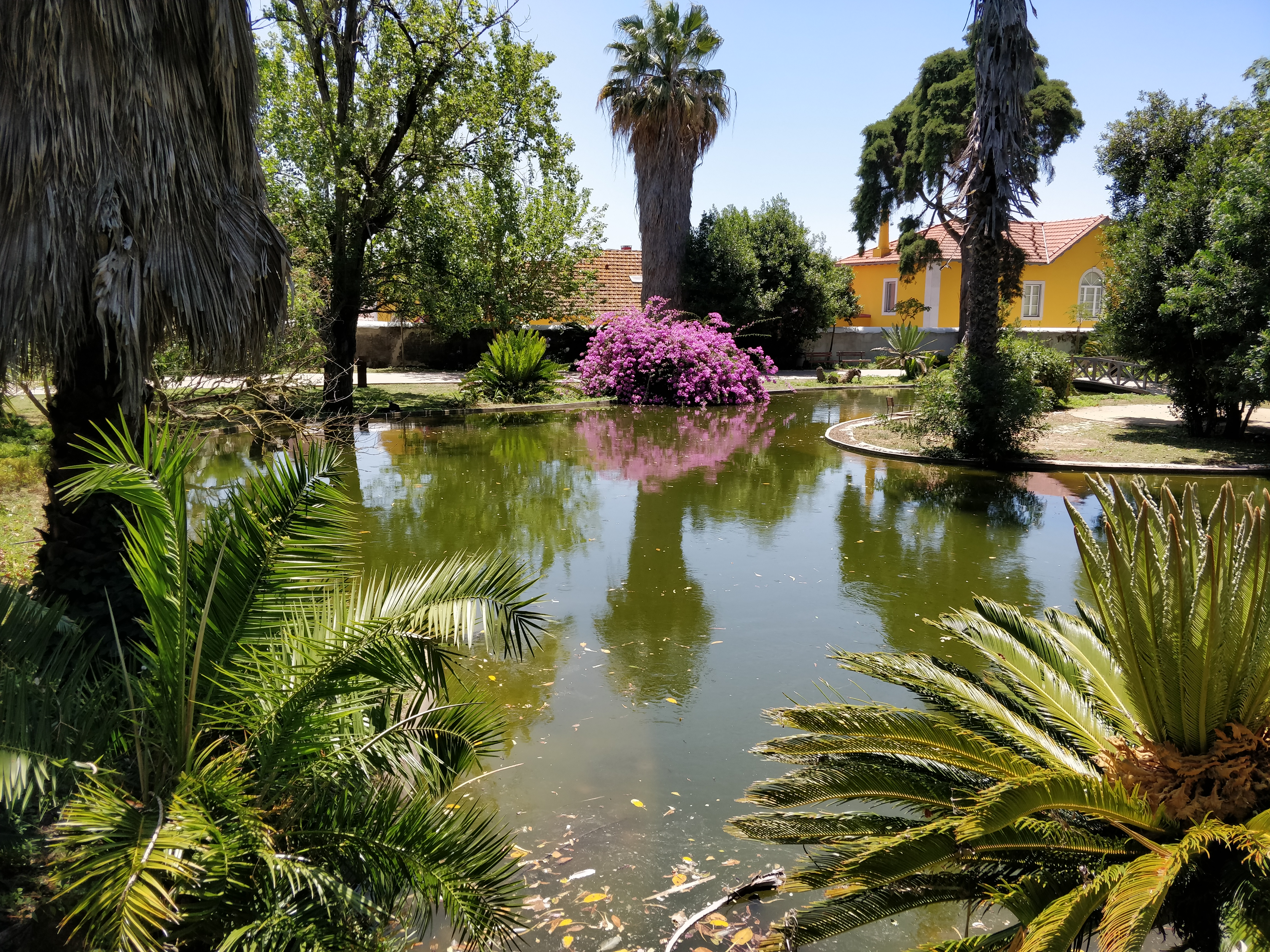
View of the lake

- Palms and cycads, including specimens of Canary Island palms (Phoenix canariensis), palms of the genus Washingtonia (Washingtonia filifera and Washingtonia robusta), Yucca gigantea. Cycads include Dioon and Encephalartos.
- Succulent plants, including specimens of species of the genus Cereus, Aloe, Euphorbia, Selenicereus and Opuntia.
- Dried plants. The museum has 50,000 dried plants and 2414 wood samples
