= Benjamín Máximo Laguna y Villanueva =

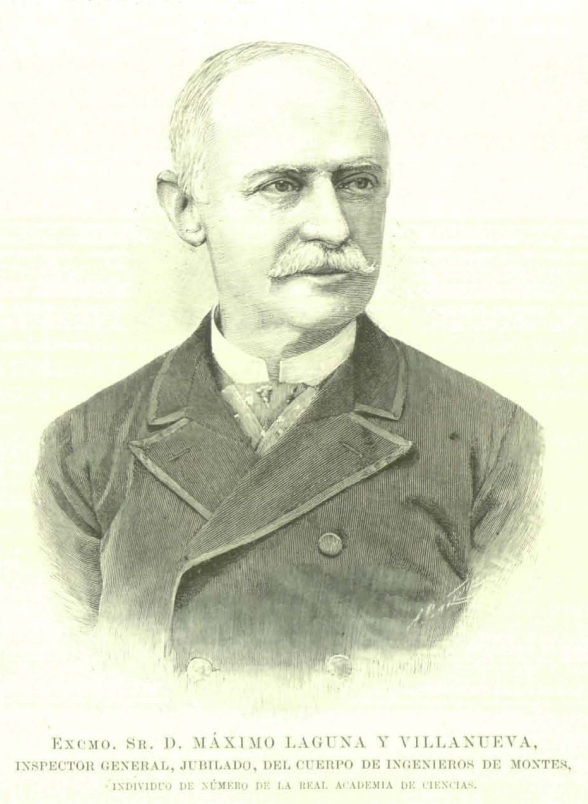
- Born: December 2, 1822; Santa Cruz de Mudela, Province of Ciudad Real, Spain
- Died: January 3, 1902 (aged 79); Madrid, Spain
- Education: Royal Saxon Academy of Forestry
- Awards: Spanish Royal Academy of Sciences
- Scientific career
- Fields: Botany, Entomology
- Author abbrev. (botany): Laguna

Benjamín Máximo Laguna y Villanueva (December 2, 1822 - January 3, 1902) was a Spanish botanist and entomologist.

While the standard form of his name is "Laguna", he is sometimes referred to by both surnames "Laguna y Villanueva".

== Education ==
Máximo Laguna was born in Santa Cruz de Mudela, in the province of Ciudad Real. In 1848 he enrolled at the Spanish forestry school, the Escuela Especial de Ingenieros de Montes, which had been recently founded at the Castle of Villaviciosa de Odón near Madrid. He received a grant to continue his studies in the Kingdom of Saxony, where he enrolled at the Royal Saxon Academy of Forestry at Tharandt, near Dresden.

== Research ==
The International Plant Names Index lists his botanical interests as Pteridophytes and Spermatophytes. He published on the flora of Spanish forests. He also studied the botany of the Philippines, although he did not visit the country. As a Spanish colony, it was provided with a forestry service in the 1860s and he was able to collaborate with his colleagues there. For example, in 1875 he published a description of what he took to be an oak, Quercus jordanae Laguna, which had been collected in Luzon. (The tree has been reclassified as a lithocarpus since Laguna made the species known to science).

His interest in insects related to his studies of their impact on trees.

== Honours and legacy ==
- Laguna was a member of the Spanish Royal Academy of Sciences.
- A school is named after him in his native town.
- The “Máximo Laguna” Arboretum at Valsaín in the Sierra de Guadarrama was planted in 1997 to commemorate World Forestry Day. Valsaín has since been included by UNESCO in a Biosphere reserve, "Real Sitio de San Ildefonso-El Espinar".
