= Ricardo Bellver =

Spanish sculptor

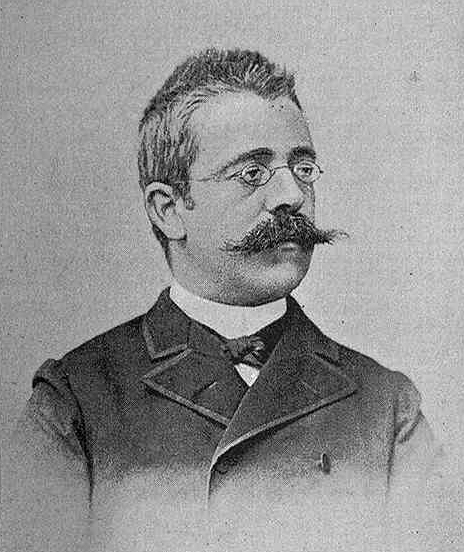
- Ricardo Bellver (1891)
- Born: 23 February 1845; Madrid, Spain
- Died: 20 December 1924 (aged 79); Madrid, Spain
- Education: sculptor
- Notable work: The Fallen Angel (Fuente del Ángel Caído)

Ricardo Bellver (Madrid, 23 February 1845 — Madrid, 20 December 1924) was a Spanish sculptor.

== Biography ==
Bellver studied at the Royal Academy of Fine Arts of San Fernando and finished his sculptural education in Rome as a grant holder.

He became well known because of his sculpture The Fallen Angel (El Ángel Caído, 1877), a work inspired by a passage from John Milton's Paradise Lost, and which represents Lucifer falling from Heaven. The sculpture (see picture), of great dramatism and originality, was awarded the first-place medal at the Spanish National Fine Arts Exhibition in 1878, and the same year it was cast in bronze for the third Paris World's Fair. Later on, the Prado Museum donated it to the City of Madrid, and in 1885 it was installed in a square with the same name in the Retiro Park (the largest one in Madrid). For that purpose, architect Francisco Jareño (1818–1892) designed a pedestal of granite, bronze and stone. The success of this work made Bellver been accepted as academician. He was director of the Arts and Works School in Madrid.

Other works of Bellver are in the Royal Basilica of Saint Francis the Great, the Seville Cathedral, Saint Joseph Church in Madrid, Saint Isidore Cemetery and the Palacio de Fomento building in Madrid.

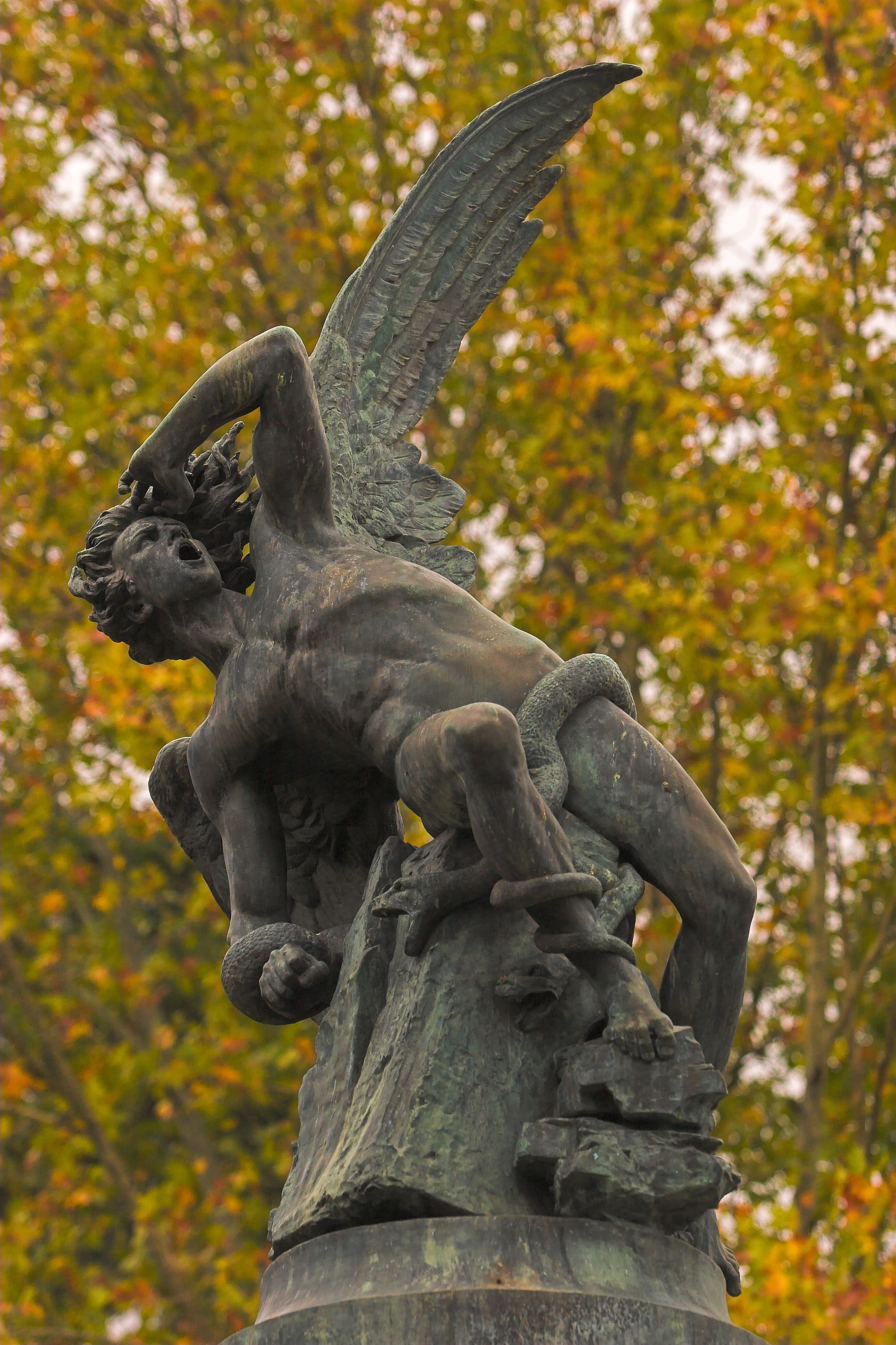
The Fallen Angel (Ricardo Bellver, 1877), in Madrid, cast in bronze for the third Paris World's Fair (1878).

== Works ==
- Saint Ines Burial (bas-relief) in the Royal Basilica of Saint Francis the Great, Madrid.
- The Fallen Angel, (El Ángel Caído), in Parque del Buen Retiro, Madrid.

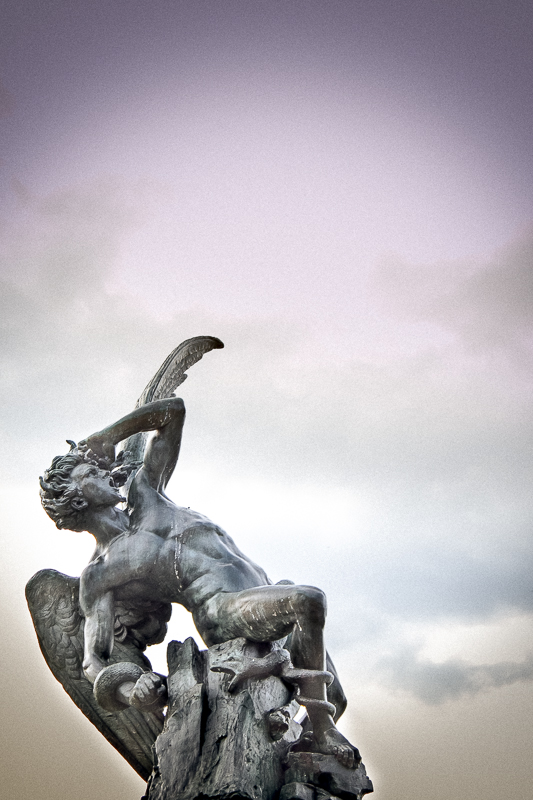
The Fallen Angel (detail)

- Saint Agatha death, bas-relief (1888).
- Saint Expeditus carving (1916), in San Vicente Martir de Abando Church (Bilbao).
- Juan Sebastián Elcano Statue (1888) in Mayor Hall Square in Guetaria (Guipúzcoa).
- Neogotical doors of Seville cathedral.
- Funerary monument of Luis de la Lastra y Cuesta, Seville Cathedral, Capilla del Cristo de Maracaibo (1880).
- Saint Bartolomew and Saint Andrew, in the Royal Basilica of Saint Francis the Great, Madrid.
- Monument to Goya, Donoso Cortés, Moratín and Meléndez Valdés, Saint Isidore Cemetery, Madrid.
- Cardinal Siliceo sepulchre at the Real Colegio de Doncellas Nobles.
