= Parque del Buen Retiro =

Urban park in Madrid, Spain

Retiro Park
- Parque del Buen Retiro
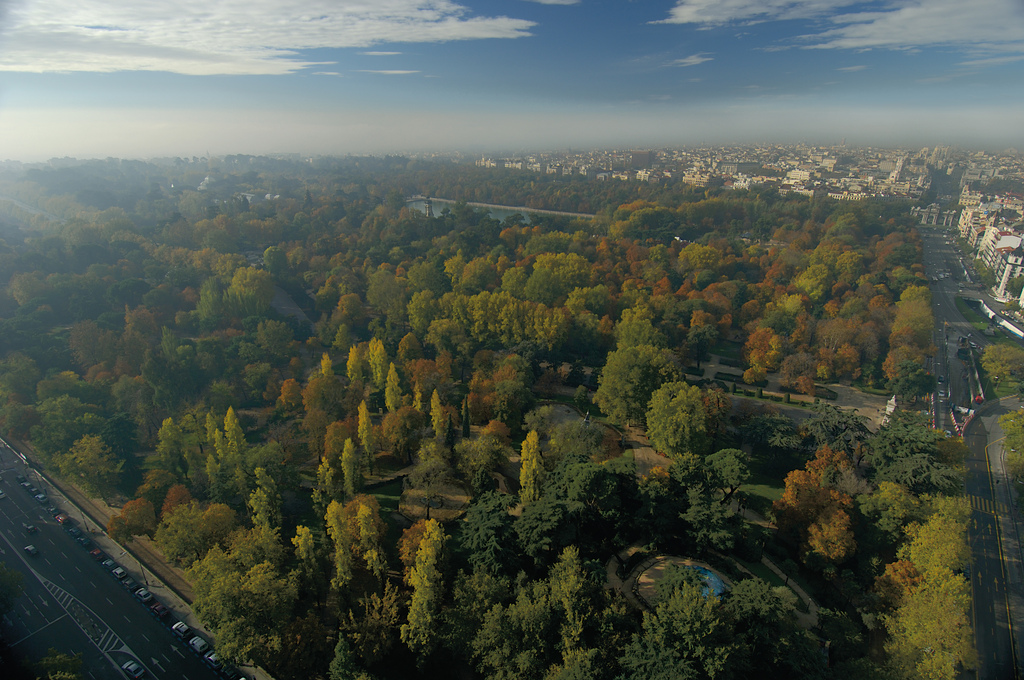
- Interactive map of Retiro Park
- Location: Madrid, Spain
- Coordinates: 40°24′54″N 03°41′02″W
- Area: 142 hectares (350 acres)
- Created: 1680
- Operator: City Council of Madrid
- Status: Public park

UNESCO World Heritage Site
- Criteria: Cultural: (ii), (iv), (vi)
- Designated: 2021 (44th session)
- Part of: Paseo del Prado and Buen Retiro, a landscape of Arts and Sciences
- Reference no.: 1618
- Region: Europe and North America

Spanish Cultural Heritage
- Type: Non-movable
- Criteria: Historic Garden
- Designated: 8 February 1935
- Reference no.: RI-52-0000015

The Retiro Park (Spanish: Parque del Buen Retiro, "Good Retreat Park"), also known as Buen Retiro Park or simply El Retiro, is one of the largest city parks in Madrid, Spain. The park belonged to the Spanish monarchy until 1868, when it became a public park following the Glorious Revolution. The park is located at the edge of the city centre, near both the Alcalá Gate and the Museo del Prado, and covers 1.4 km^{2} (350 acres). It has gardens, monuments, galleries, an artificial lake, and event-hosting venues. In 2021, Buen Retiro Park became part of a combined UNESCO World Heritage Site that also includes Paseo del Prado.

== History ==
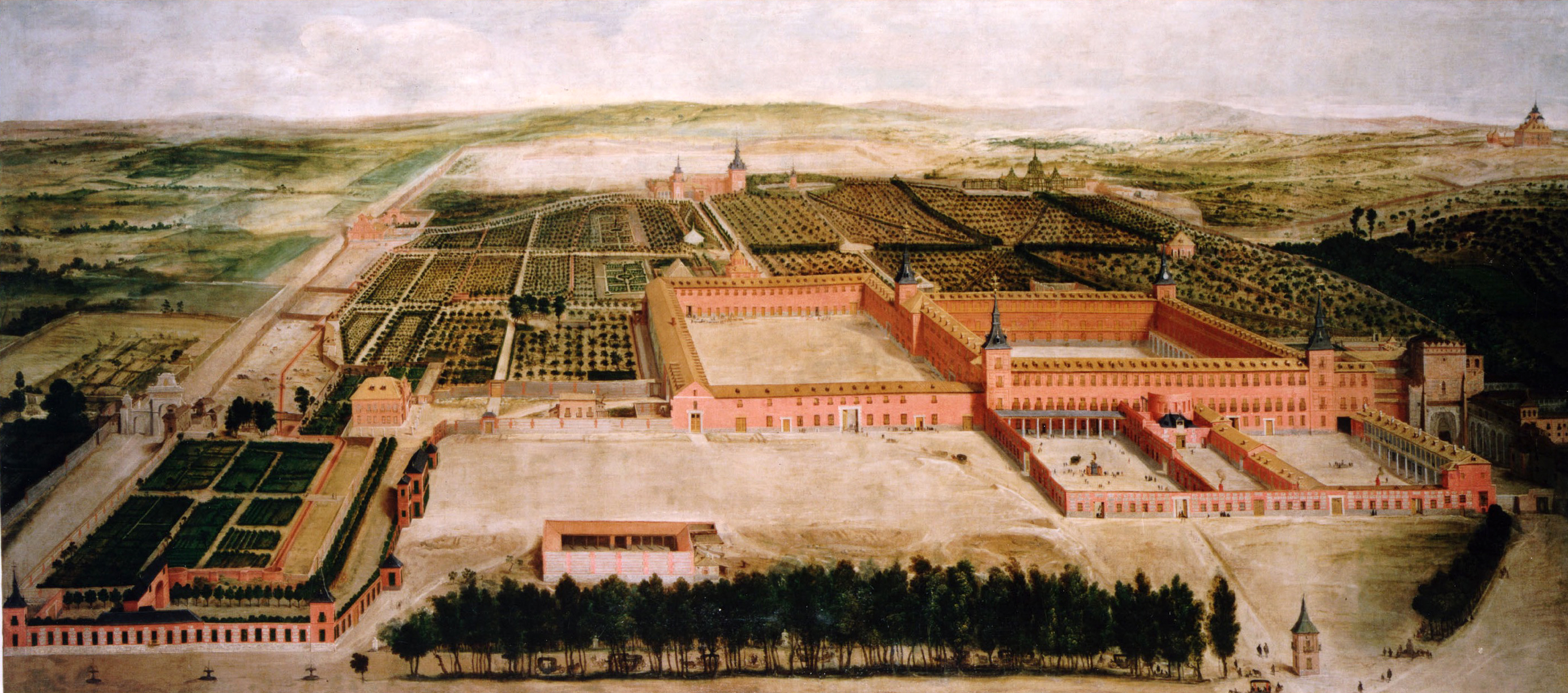
The old Buen Retiro Palace with the gardens

In 1505, the Jeronimites' monastery was moved to a new Isabelline Gothic-style building at the present-day site of the Church of Saint Jerome the Royal. The royal family had a retreat built as part of the new church. King Philip II (ruled 1556–1598) moved the Spanish court to Madrid in 1561. Philip had the Retiro enlarged under the direction of his architect Juan Bautista de Toledo, who also formally laid out tree-lined avenues.

The gardens were extended in the 1620s, when Gaspar de Guzmán, Count-Duke of Olivares, gave the king several tracts of adjacent land for the court's recreational use. Olivares, with the king's permission, drew up plans for a royal residence far more grand than the existing villas, which had been built for Roman nobles. Although this second royal residence was to be built in what were then outlying areas of Madrid, it would also be in an ideal location, not far from the existing alcázar. In the 1630s, the palace buildings were constructed under the supervision of the architects Giovanni Battista Crescenzi and Alonso Carbonell. Two of the buildings remain today: the Casón del Buen Retiro, which served as a ballroom, and the Hall of Realms.

The Count-Duke of Olivares commissioned the park in the 1630s. It was designed by Cosimo Lotti, a landscaper and engineer who had previously worked on the layout of the Boboli Gardens. The layout of the gardens were defined by key water features, including the great pond, the great canal, the narrow channel, and the chamfered (or bellflower) pond. Buen Retiro became the center of Habsburg court life for much of the Spanish Golden Age. During the reigns of Philip IV and Charles II, several plays were performed in the park for the royal family and the court.

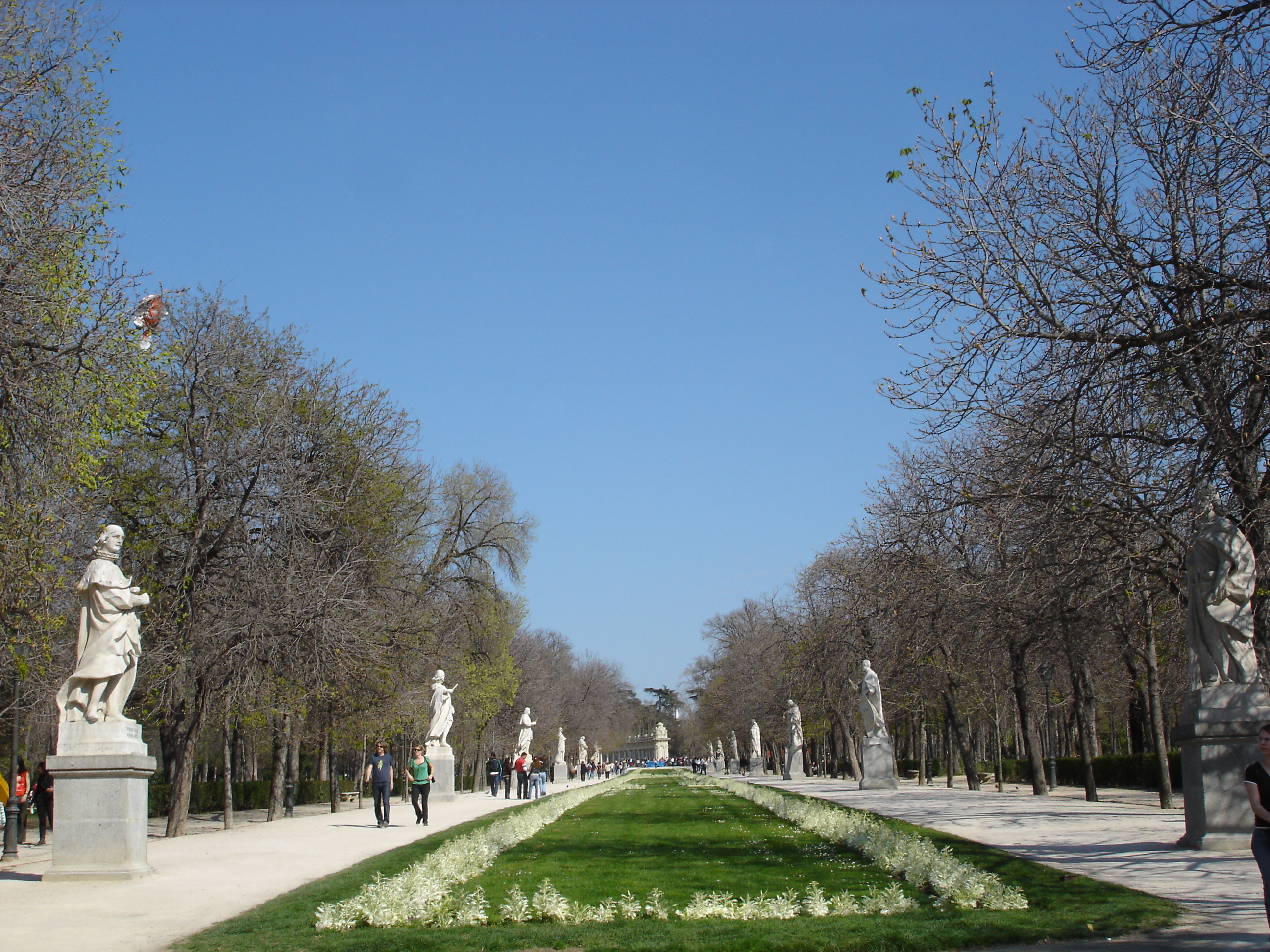
Paseo de la Argentina

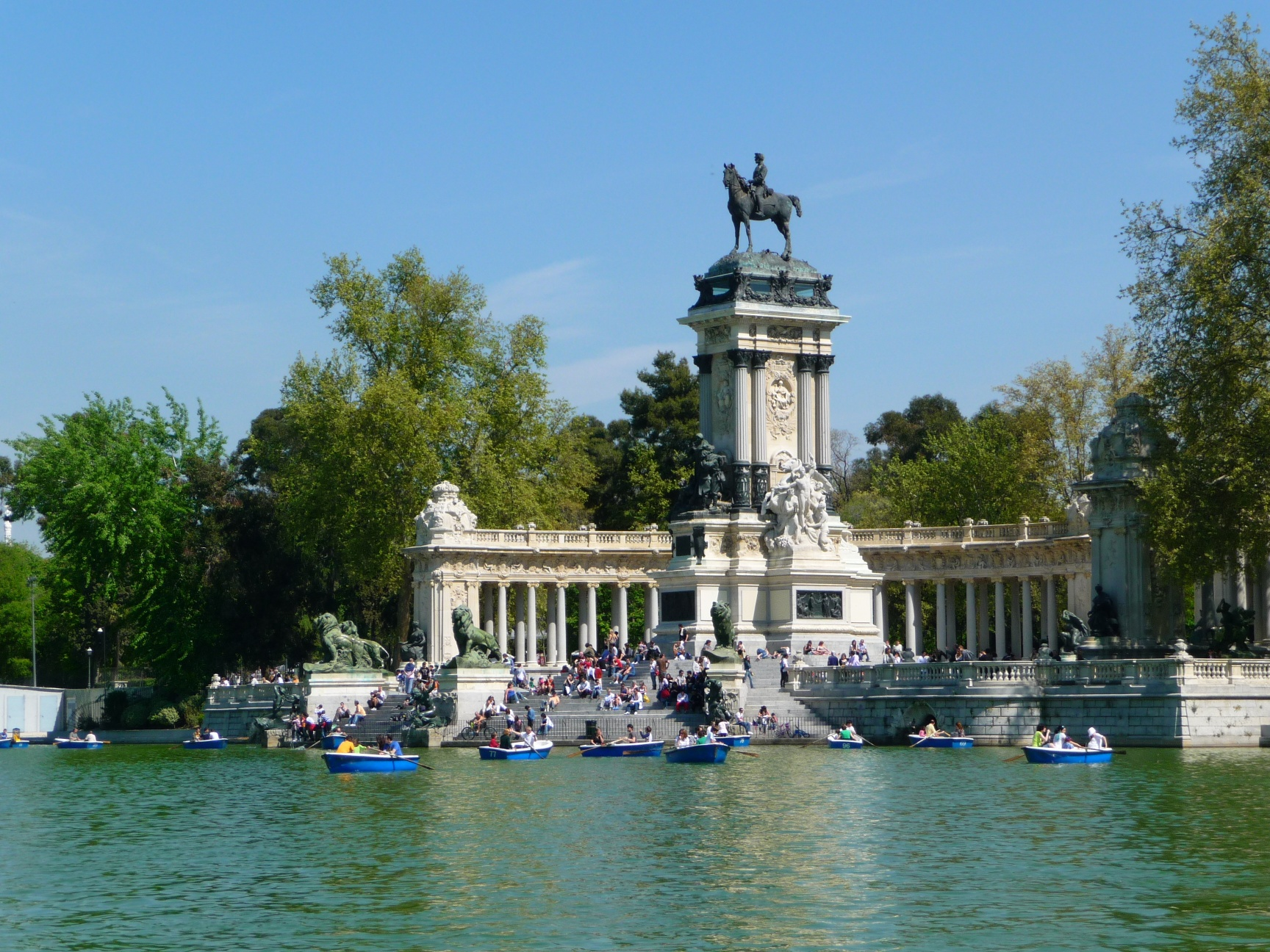
Lake, boats, and the Alfonso XII monument

The gardens were initially neglected after the death of Philip IV in 1665, but have been restored and changed on many occasions. Philip V ordered the creation of a parterre, the only French-style garden in the complex. During the reign of Ferdinand VI, Buen Retiro was the setting for Italian operas. Charles III (r. 1759–1788) ordered the replacement of the old walls with wrought-iron railings. The Buen Retiro Palace was used until the era of Charles III. Juan de Villanueva's Astronomical Observatory was built during the reign of Charles IV (r. 1788–1808).

Most of the palace and its gardens were destroyed during the Peninsular War (1807–1814) when the troops of the First French Empire built the Citadel of Madrid on park grounds. The park went through many changes during Queen Isabella II's reign. More trees were planted and previously unplanted areas were landscaped. In 1868, when Queen Isabella was overthrown in the Glorious Revolution, the gardens became publicly-owned.

In 1883, the park hosted the Exposición Nacional de Minería. 14 hectares of the park served as fairgrounds of the 1887 Philippines Exposition, which included a human zoo. At the beginning of the 20th century, the Monument to Alfonso XII of Spain, designed by José Grases Riera, was built next to the pond. Countless statues, fountains and commemorative monuments have filled the park, converting it into an open-air sculpture museum. New gardens were created during the 1930s and 1940s, attributed to Chief Gardener Cecilio Rodriguez, who also built the rose garden.

== Features ==
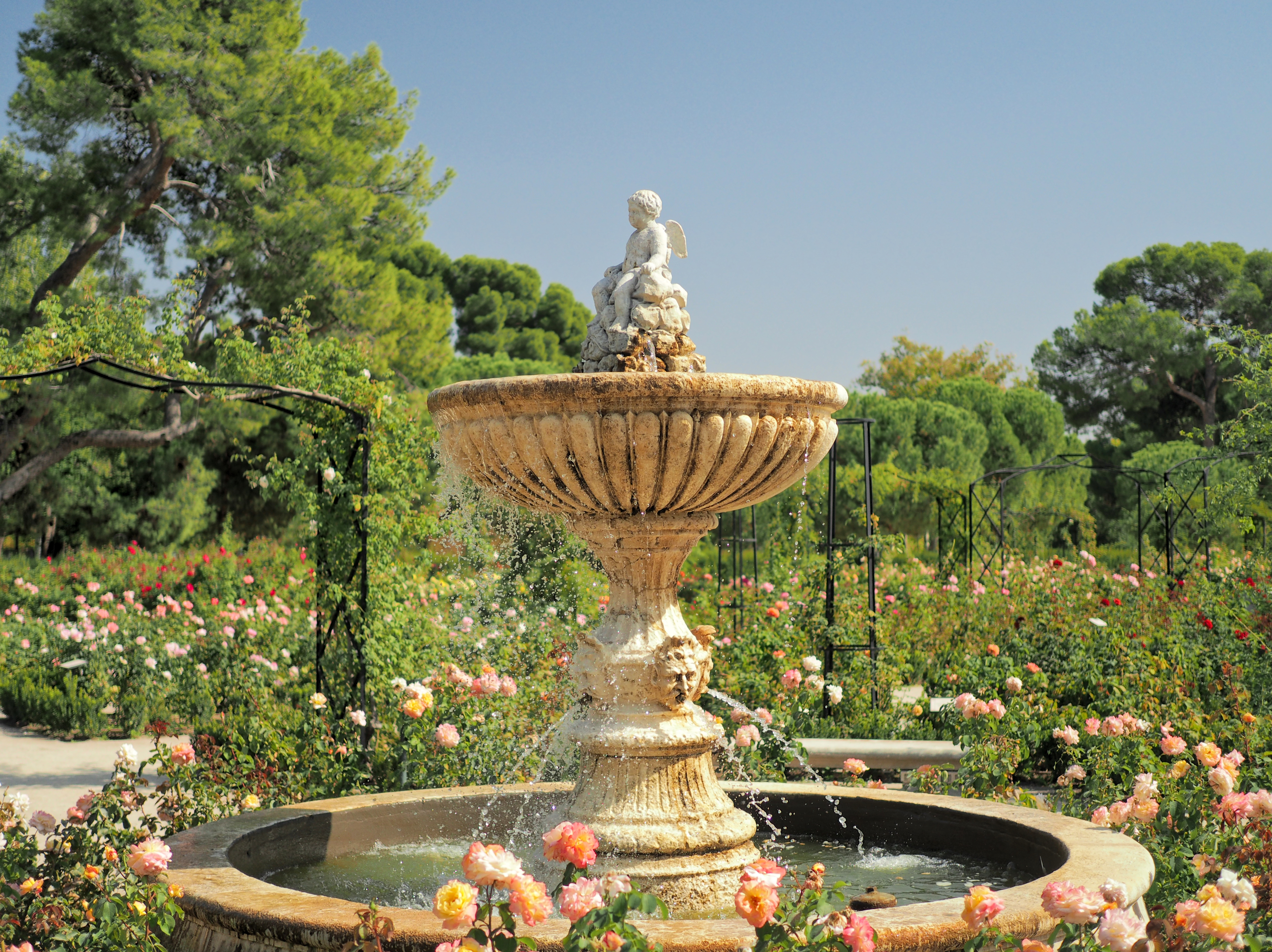
Rosaleda (rose garden)

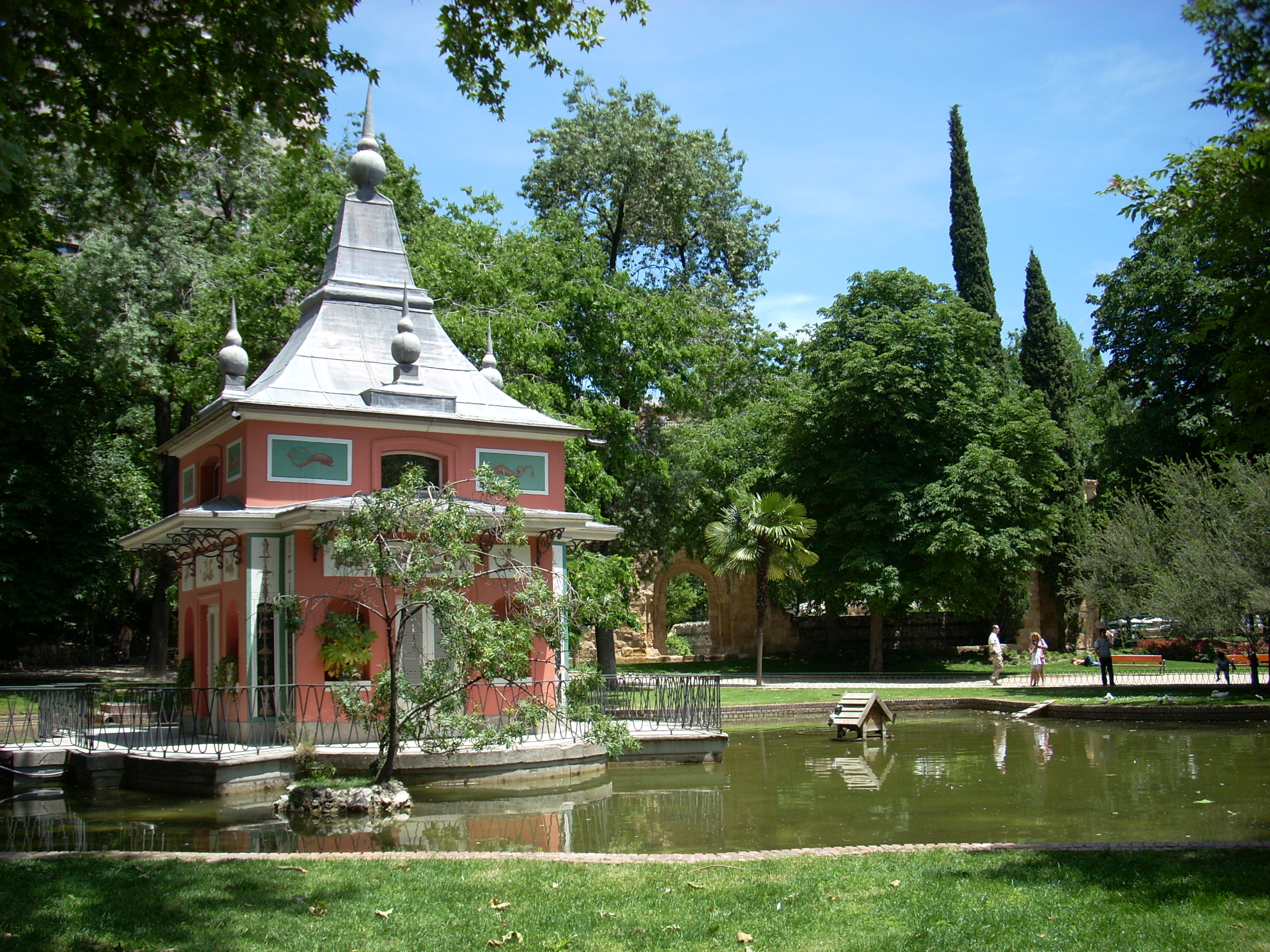
Casita del Pescador

Close to the northern entrance of the park is the Estanque del Retiro (Retirement Pond), a large artificial pond. Nearby is the monument to King Alfonso XII, featuring a semicircular colonnade and an equestrian statue of the monarch on top of a tall central core.

The Rosaleda (Rose Garden) is an early 20th-century feature inspired by the Bagatelle rose garden in the Bois de Boulogne. Beside the roses stands the Fountain of the Fallen Angel, erected in 1922, whose main sculpture El Angel Caído is a work by Ricardo Bellver (1845–1924) inspired by a passage from John Milton's Paradise Lost, which represents Lucifer falling from Heaven. It is claimed that this statue is the only known public monument of Satan. The few remaining buildings of the Buen Retiro Palace, including Casón del Buen Retiro and the Salon de Reinos, now house museum collections. The Casón has a collection of 19th- and 20th-century paintings, including art by the Spanish painter Joaquín Sorolla.

Since assuming its role as a public park in the late 19th century, Buen Retiro Park has been used as a venue for various international exhibitions. Several themed buildings have remained as a testament to such events, including the Mining Building, popularly known as the Velázquez Palace (1884) by architect Ricardo Velázquez Bosco, who designed the Palacio de Cristal (Crystal Palace), a glass pavilion inspired by The Crystal Palace in London, undoubtedly the gardens' most extraordinary building. Built along with its artificial pond in 1887 for the Philippine Islands Exhibitions, the Palacio de Cristal was first used to display flower species indigenous to the archipelago. The landscape-style gardens in the former Campo Grande are also a reminder of the international exhibitions that have taken place here in the past.

The Paseo de la Argentina, also known as Paseo de las Estatuas (Statue Walk), is decorated with some of the statues of kings from the Royal Palace, sculpted between 1750 and 1753. There are art galleries in the Crystal Palace, Palacio de Velázquez and Casa de Vacas. Also in the Retiro Park is the Forest of Remembrance (Bosque del recuerdo), a memorial monument to commemorate the 191 victims of the 2004 Madrid train bombings.

== Activities ==
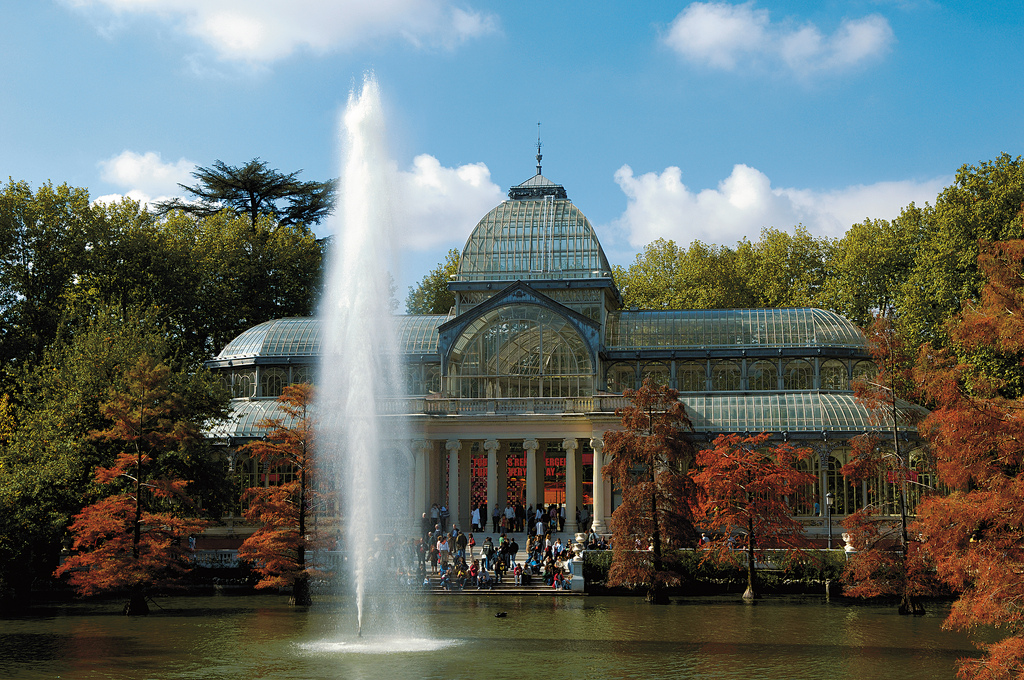
Crystal Palace in Retiro Park

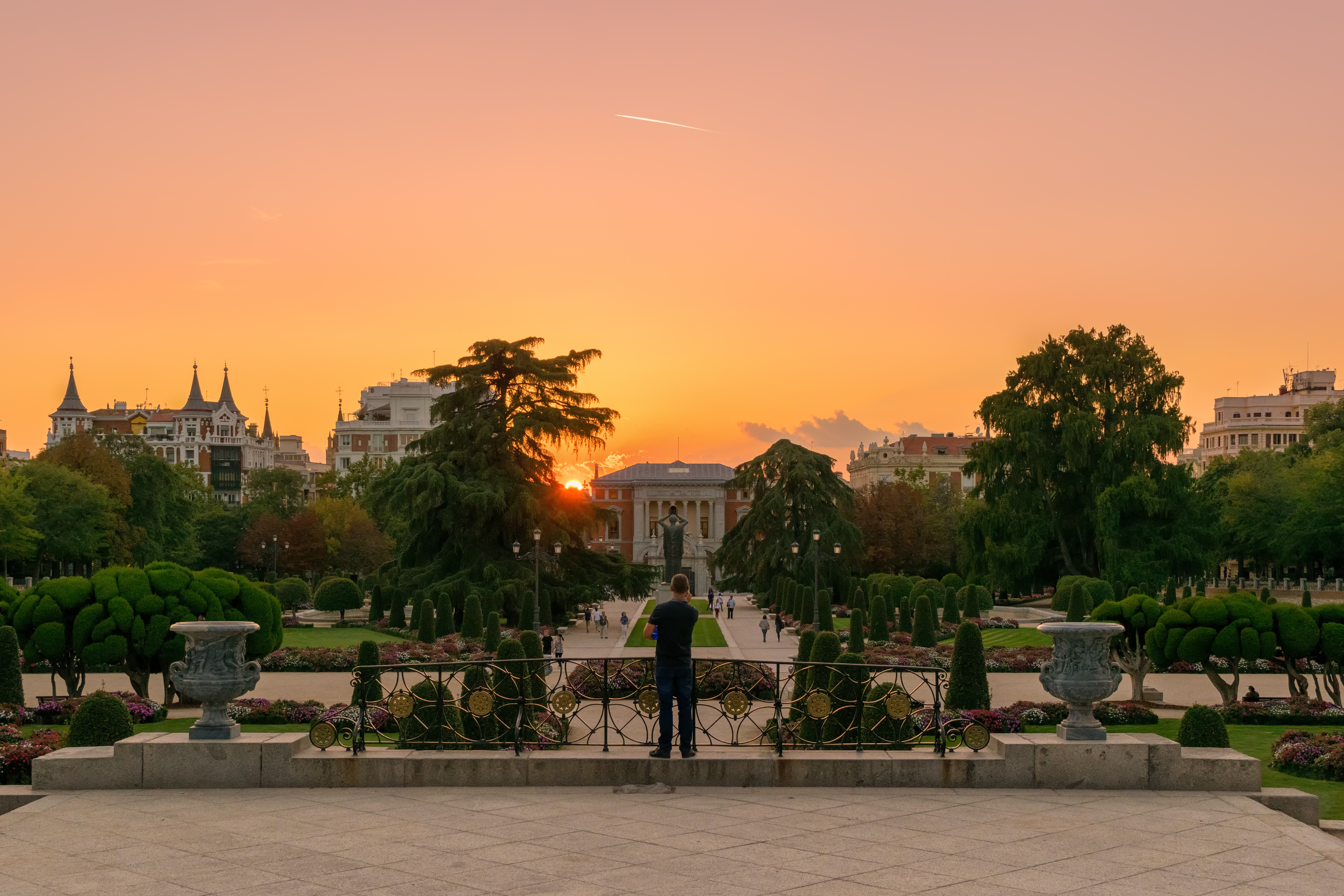
Sunset in Retiro

Every Sunday from late May through early October, the Banda Sinfónica de Madrid gives free midday concerts from the bandstand in the park near the Calle de Alcalá. Manuel Lillo Torregrosa composed Kiosko del Retiro for this bandstand. The park features an annual Book Fair where people can drop off or sell their used books, magazines, or newspapers. Events throughout the year include concerts, firework shows, and holiday festivals, and cultural events.

Retiro Park has specific outdoor exercise areas for young and old people. The elderly exercise area includes stretching equipment and bicycle pedals. The youth area includes bars for triceps dips, pull-ups, and sit-ups, as well as large stones that locals have brought to use as weights.

Around the Retiro Pond lake, many puppet shows, street performers, and fortune tellers perform. Rowing boats can be rented to paddle around the Estanque, and horse-drawn carriages are available. Retiro is home to multiple city-managed sports courts and several playground areas. The inside of the Palacio de Cristal has been modified to include a stone slide. Major paths and walkways in the park are used by families, runners, bikers and rollerbladers.

== Gallery ==
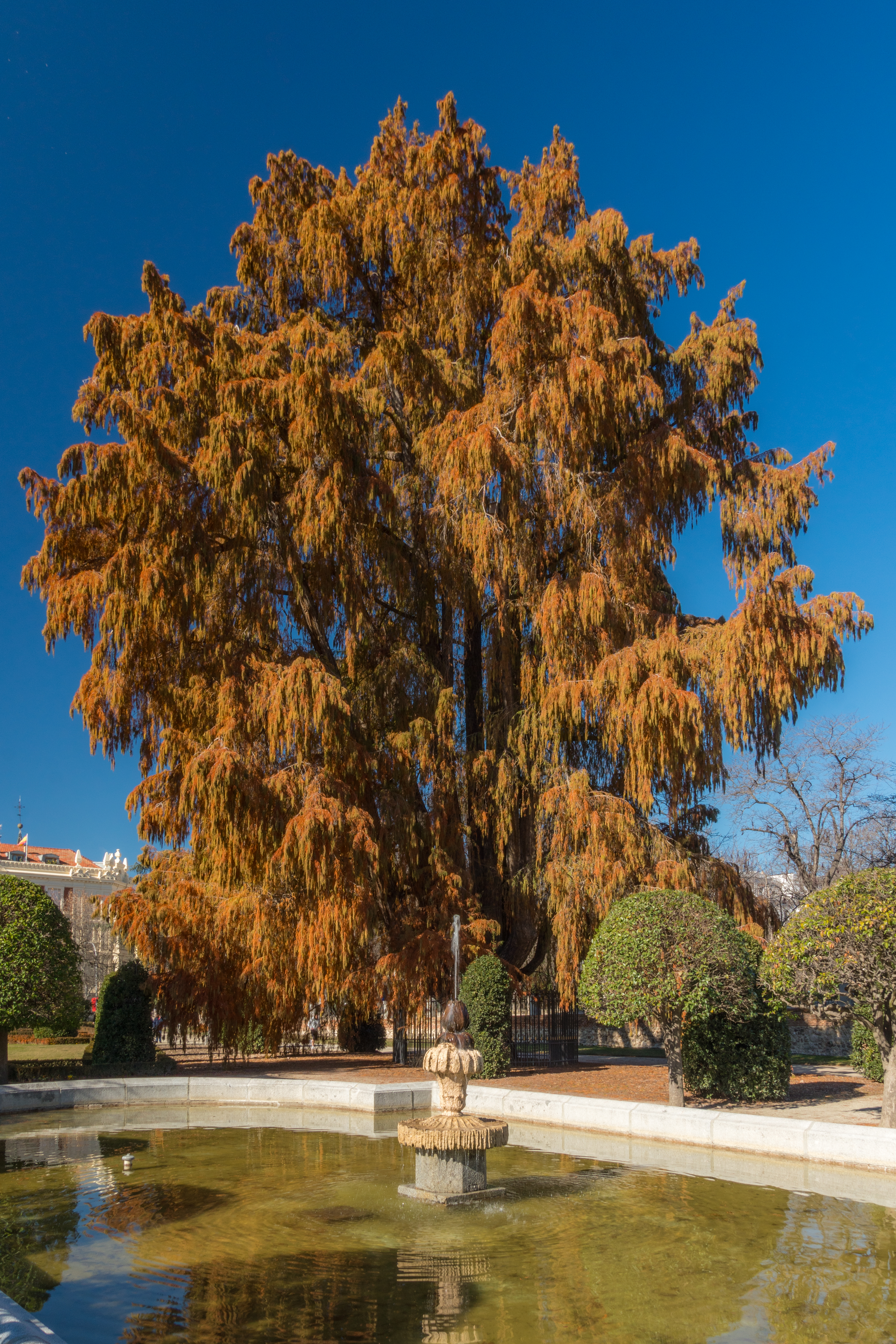
Centennial ahuehuete in winter

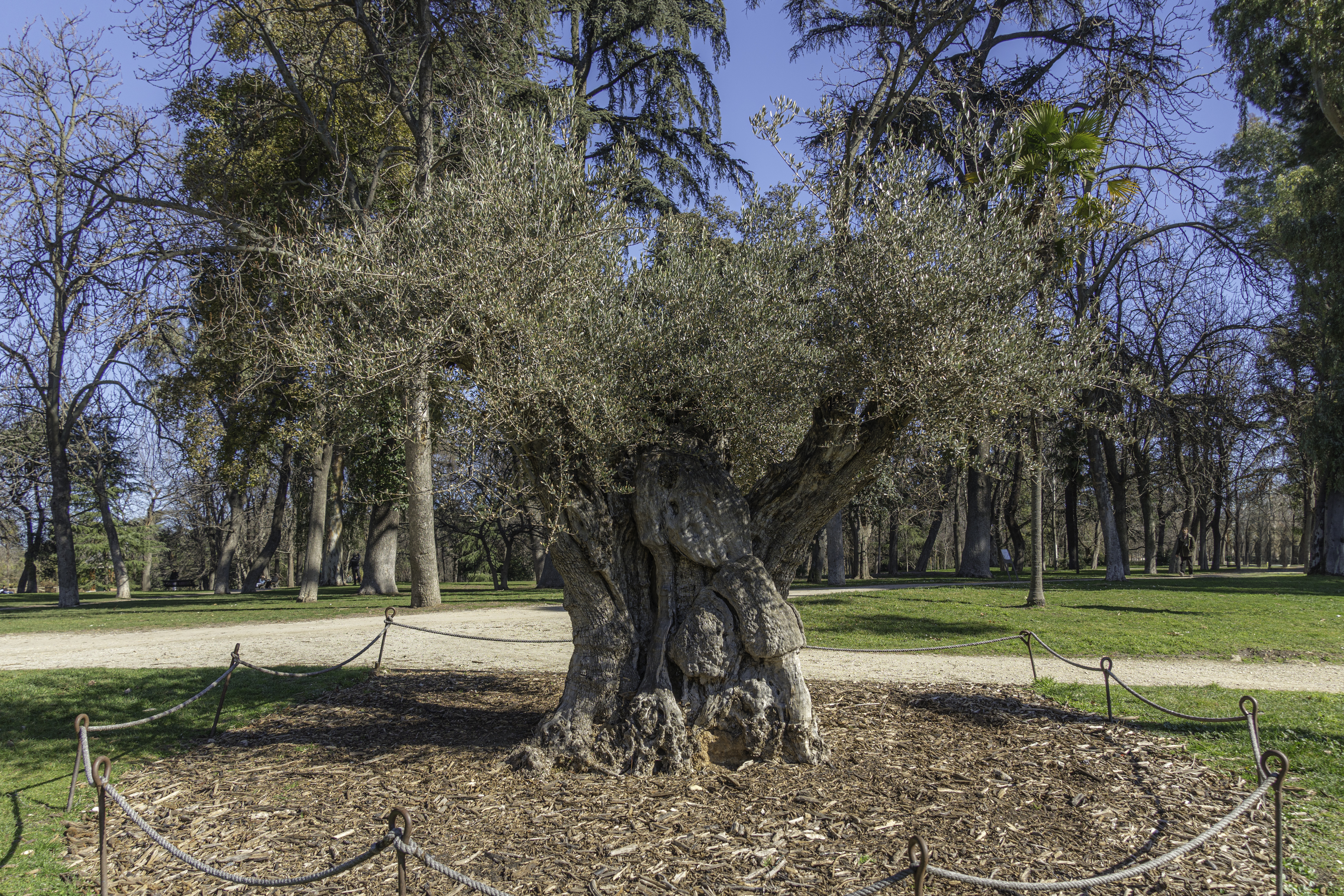
An olive planted in 2023, estimated to be 627 years old

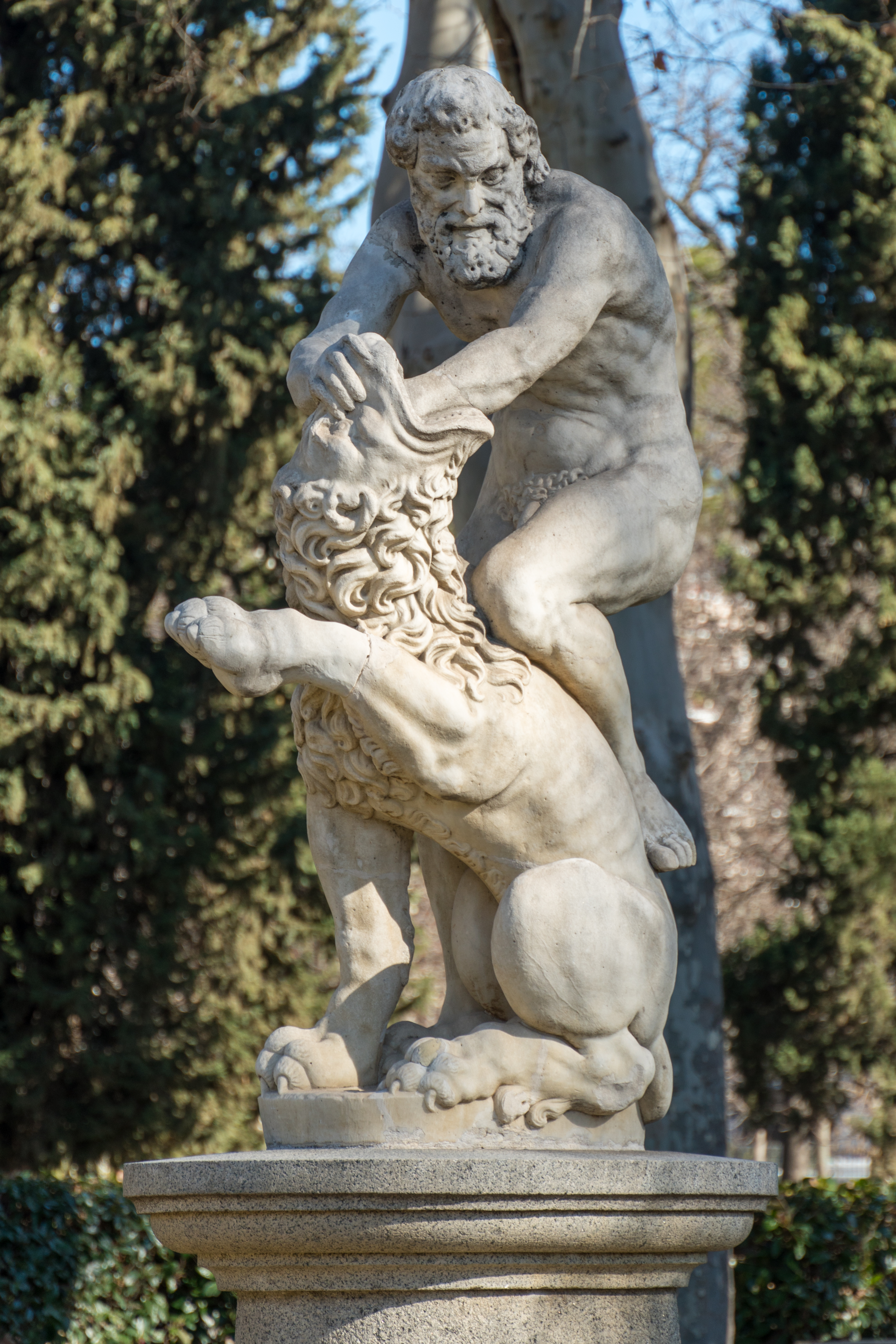
Statue of Hercules and the Nemean lion

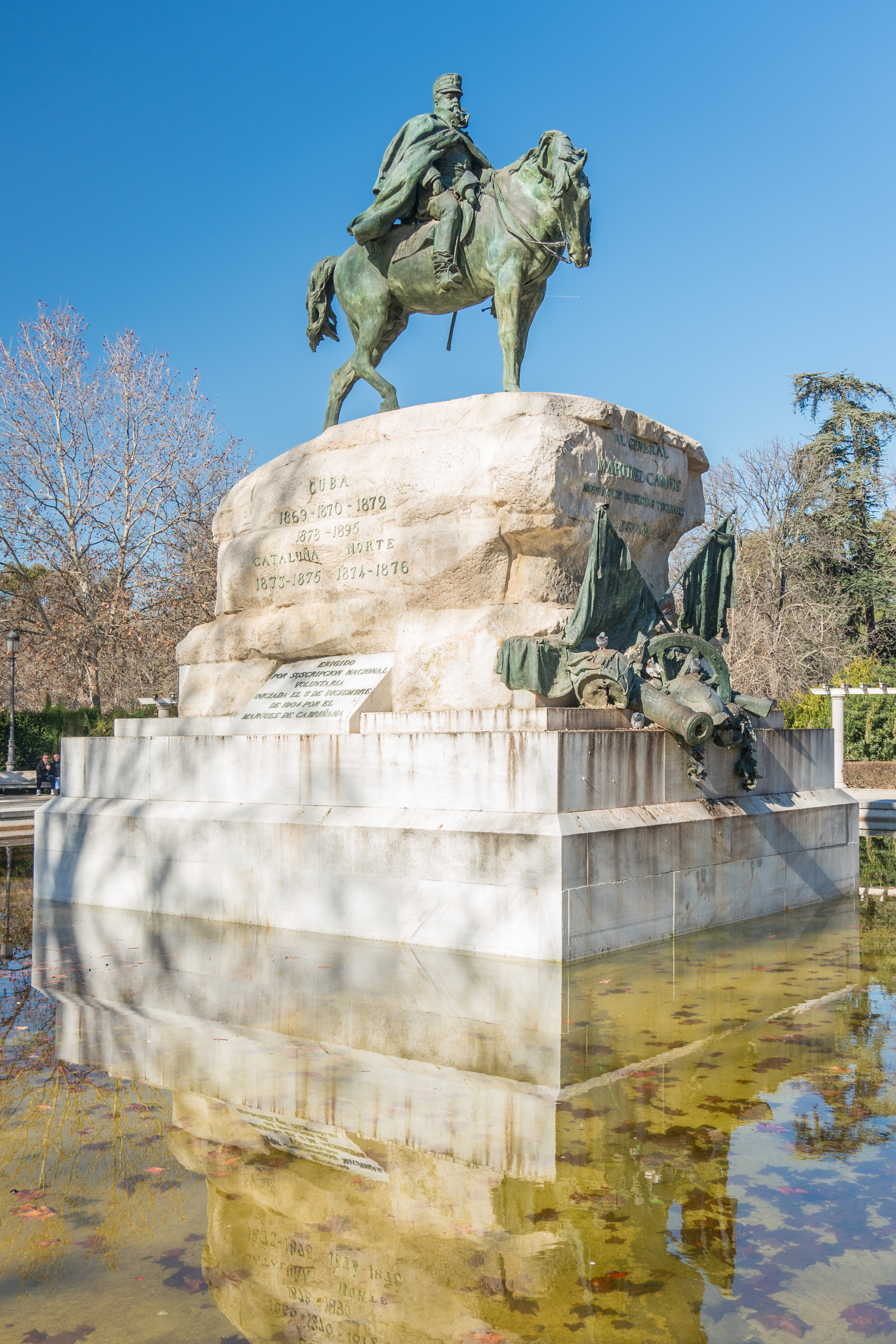
Monument to Arsenio Martínez Campos

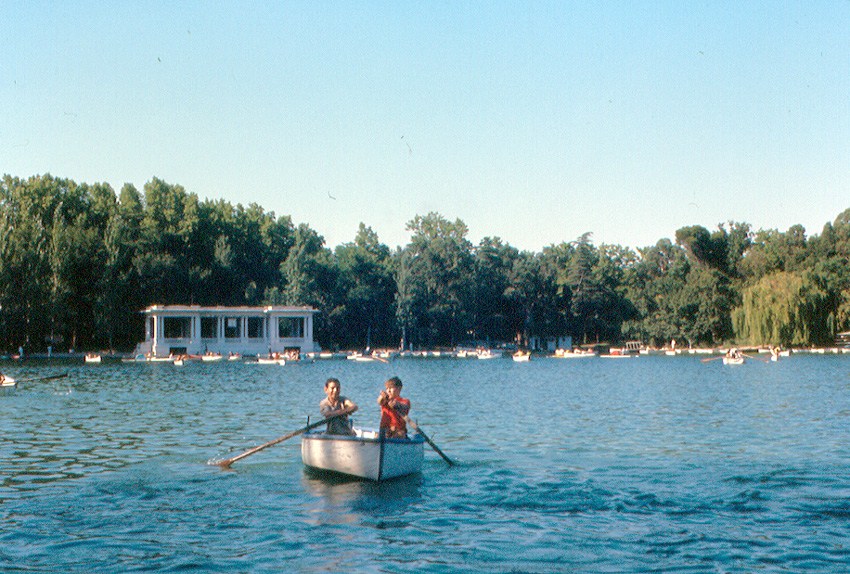
Row boats in 1968

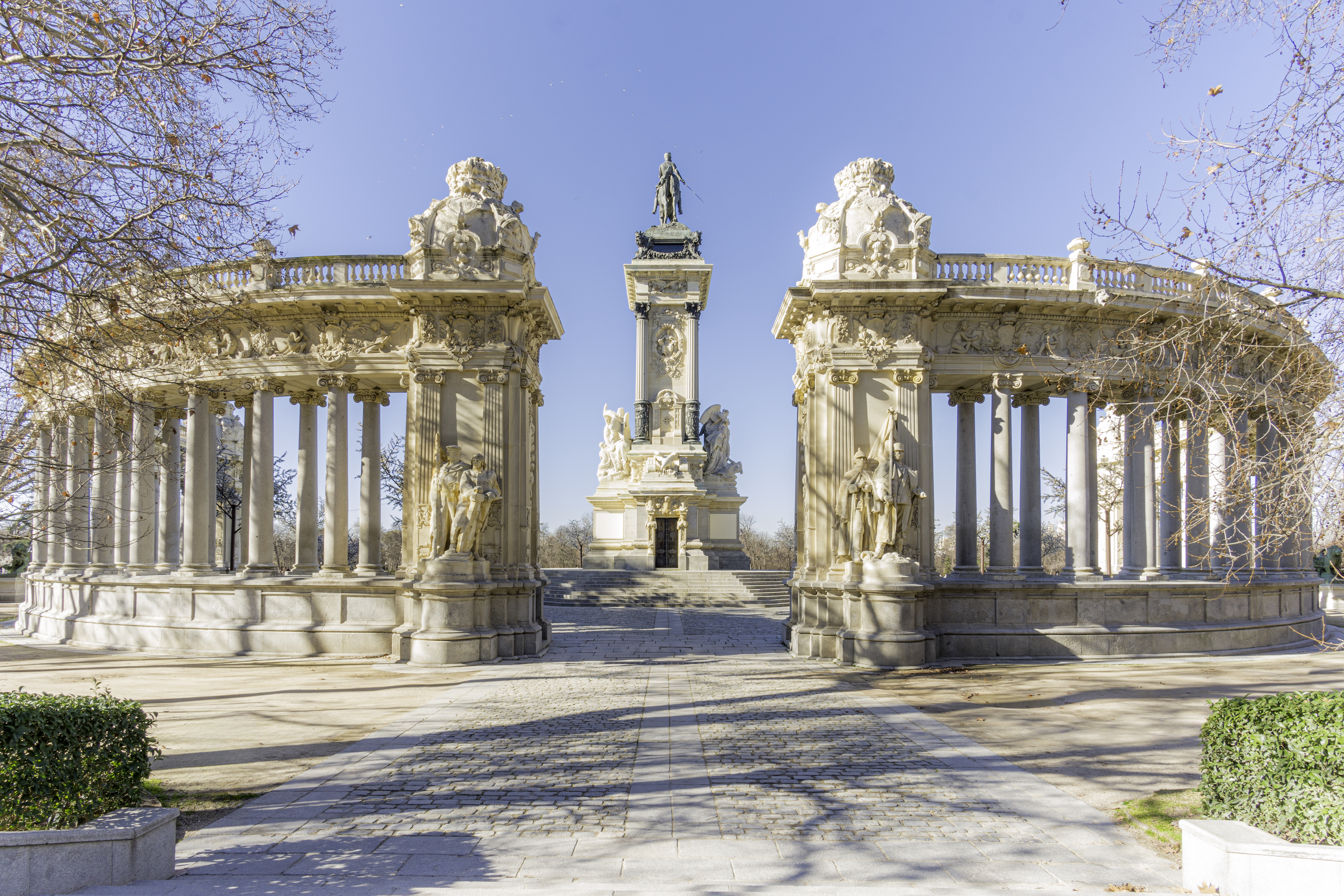
Monument to Alfonso XII

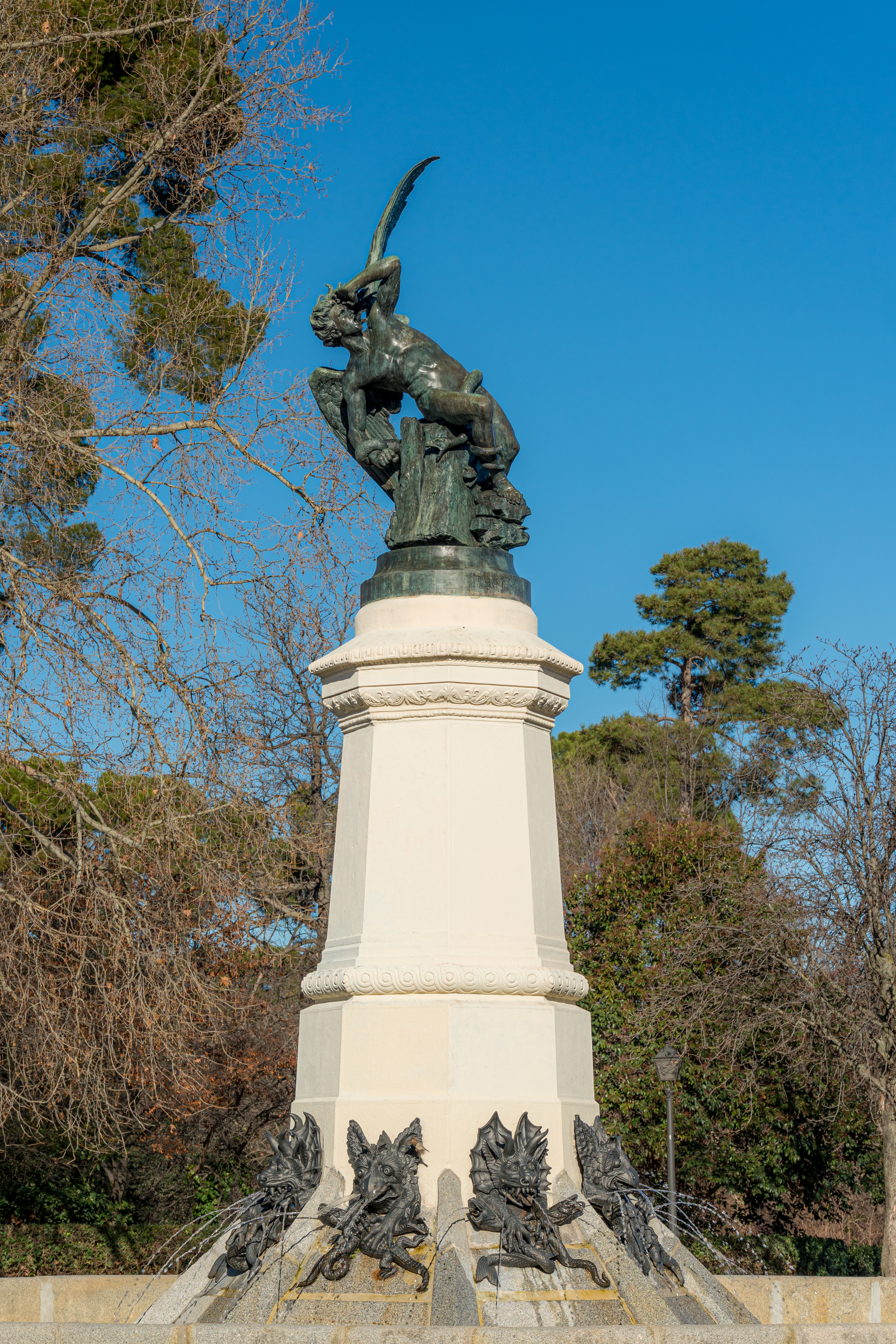
Fountain of the Fallen Angel

== See also ==
- Real Fábrica del Buen Retiro
