= Bullring of Toledo =

Coordinates: 39.8673°N 4.0233°W

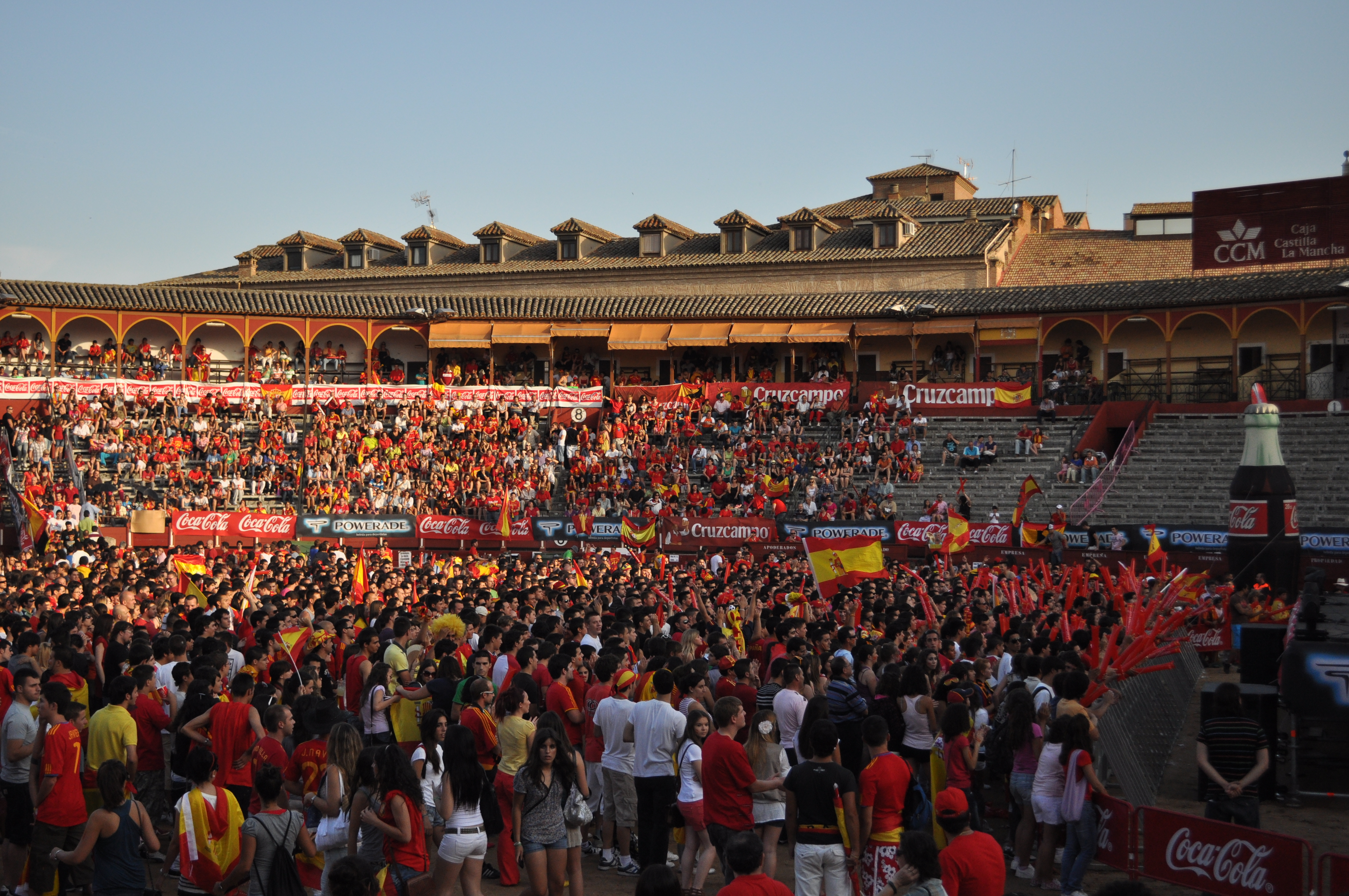
View of the bullfighting arena

The bullring is a building located in Toledo, Castile-La Mancha, Spain.

== History ==
In the capital of the Empire still remains in writing the fight of a bullfight in the year 1566, on the occasion of the birth of the infanta Clara Eugenia, daughter of Philip II. In that same scenario years later, concretely in 1572 two great bullfighting festivities were celebrated that caused sensation: the first one was due to the great victory of Lepanto and the second with the birth of Prince Ferdinand.

For many years, until 1865, the bullfights were celebrated in the plaza del Zocodover, backbone of the Castilian city, sometimes sounded. It is in the 19th century when rise the new and definitive bullring of Toledo, located on the road of Madrid. Following a design by Francisco Jareño its architect, the works were financed by the issuance of shares and it is estimated that there were more than three hundred founding members.

== Features ==
The bullring presents an Arab style with walls of masonry and eight stretches of granite stone. In its interior we can find the basic facilities, such as pen, chapel, infirmary, chiqueros, courtyard for horses and plateau for bulls. Its capacity is 8,530 spectators, reason why it is cataloged in Spain between the squares of second category. It was released on August 18, 1866, with bulls from Vicente Martínez and Félix Gómez for Cayetano Sanz and El Tato, stocking the last Frascuelo, who found himself as a spectator.

== Fairs ==
The Corpus Fair, which takes place in late May and early June, is the most important event in Toledo. During this period numerous bullfights are held.

== Location ==
It is located in the Calle Huérfanos Cristino, S/N (CP 45003), in front of the old María Cristina cinemas.

== Shows ==
- 21/07/2017: David Bisbal, 'Hijos del Mar Tour'
- 31/12/2016: XXXV San Silvestre Toledana (target installed in the arena)
- 06/11/2016: Youth Band Municipal School of Music 'Diego Ortiz'
- 22/10/2016: IX Toledo Night Race (departure from the arena)
- 14/10/2016: Malú, 'Tour Chaos'
- 30/09/2016: Civil Guard, 'Exhibition of Operative Procedures'
- 11/06/2016: Estopa, 'Tour Rumbo a lo Desconocido'
- 21/05/2016: Carlos Baute
- 18/2015: Miguel Poveda, 'Turns Sonnets and Poems for Freedom'
- 15/08/2015: Julián Maeso + Supersubmarina
- 14/08/2015: Antonio Orozco, 'Gira Origen'
- 31/05/2015: Cantajuegos, 'Tour 10th Anniversary'
- 30/05/2015: El Barrio, 'Tour Son of Levante'
- 29/05/2015: Melendi, 'Turns a Student More'
- 20/03/2015: Romeo Santos, 'Romeo Santos Vol 2 World Tour'
- 16/08/2014: Elefantes, 'Tour El rinoceronte' + Izal, 'Tour Agujeros de gusano'
- 15/06/2014: Malú, 'Tour Sí'
- 07/05/2011: Mariano Rajoy and María Dolores de Cospedal, PP rally.
- 24/04/2010: El Barrio
- 30/07/2002: Rosa López, 'Tour 2002'
- 29/05/2000: Mónica Naranjo, 'Tour Minage'
