= Forest of Remembrance =

Remembrance of the 2004 Madrid train bombing

Coordinates: 40°24′43″N 3°41′13″W

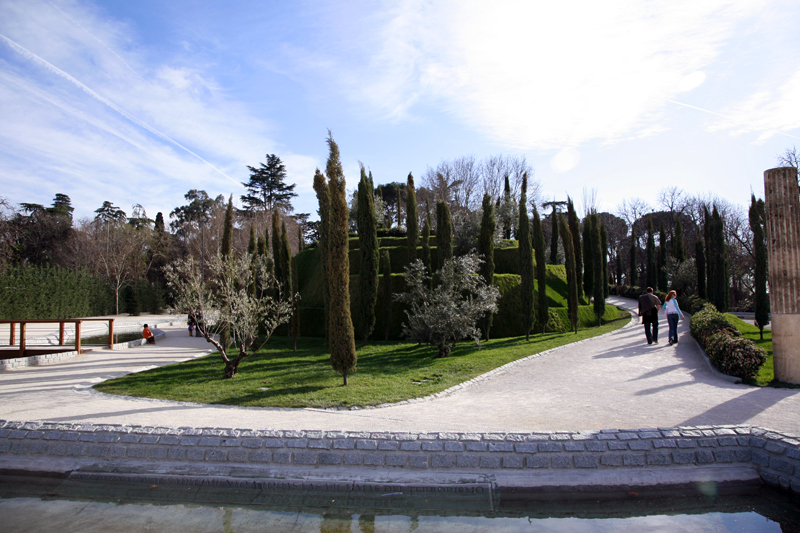
The forest in March 2007

The Forest of Remembrance (Spanish: Bosque del Recuerdo), formerly known as the Forest of the Departed (Bosque de los Ausentes), is a memorial garden located in the park of Parque del Buen Retiro in Madrid, Spain that commemorates the 191 civilian victims of the 2004 Madrid train bombings on 11 March 2004 and the special forces agent who died when the seven suicide bombers subsequently killed themselves on April 3, 2004, while under siege by security forces in their apartment block.

The new name, Bosque del Recuerdo (Forest of Remembrance), was chosen after the survivors and the victims' families argued that those killed are forever present and have never departed from their hearts.

The memorial comprises 192 olive trees and cypresses, one for each person killed, and is surrounded by a channel of water intended to symbolise life. The location is a hillock near the Atocha railway station, one of the sites of the atrocities.

== Inauguration ==
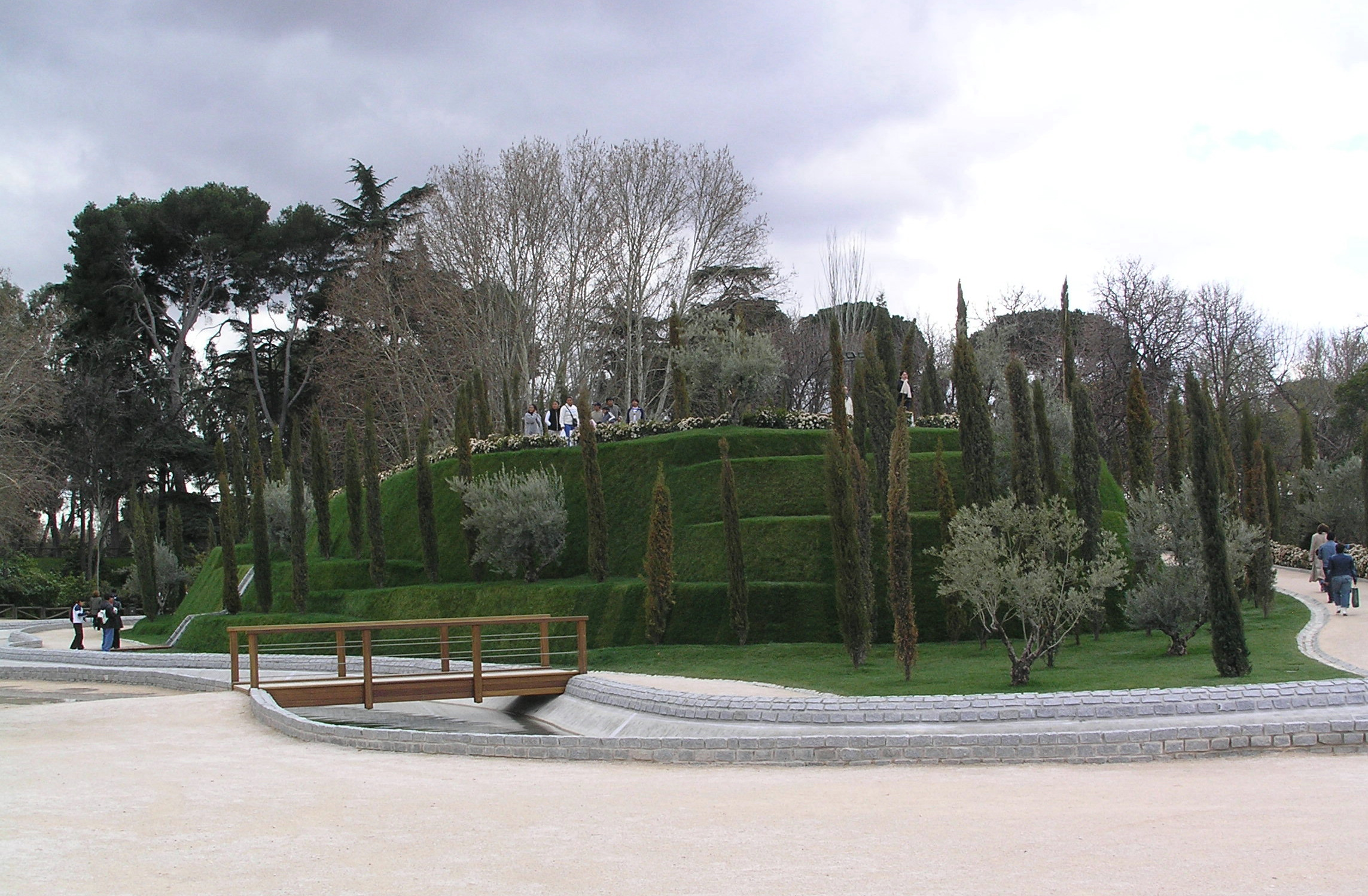
The forest in March 2006.

King Juan Carlos I and Queen Sofia presided over the dedication ceremony, which took place on 11 March 2005. They had the honour of being the first to place flowers at the memorial. Their bouquet of white flowers bore the message: "In memory of all the victims of terrorism".

The park was designed by El Invernadero, Belen Arroyo and Ines Urquijo.

Their Royal Highnesses Prince Felipe and Princess Letizia of Asturias, the President of the Government of Spain José Luis Rodríguez Zapatero and political representatives of all the parties took part in the inauguration, as well as some heads of state and world leaders like the United Nations Secretary-General Kofi Annan, the King of Morocco Mohammed VI, the President of Afghanistan Hamid Karzai, the President of Senegal Abdoulaye Wade, the President of Mauritania Maaouya Ould Sid'Ahmed Taya, the Prime Minister of Poland Marek Belka, the President of Portugal Jorge Sampaio, the Grand Duke Henri of Luxembourg, the foreign policy chief of the European Union Javier Solana, the President of the European Parliament Josep Borrell and the ambassadors of the sixteen countries that lost citizens in the attacks.

At the request of the victims' families, no speeches were delivered during the ceremony. However, a 17-year-old cellist performed "El Cant dels Ocells" (Catalan: "The Song of the Birds") by Pablo Casals.
