= Fuente del Ángel Caído =

Fountain in Madrid

Coordinates: 40.411053°N 3.682535°W

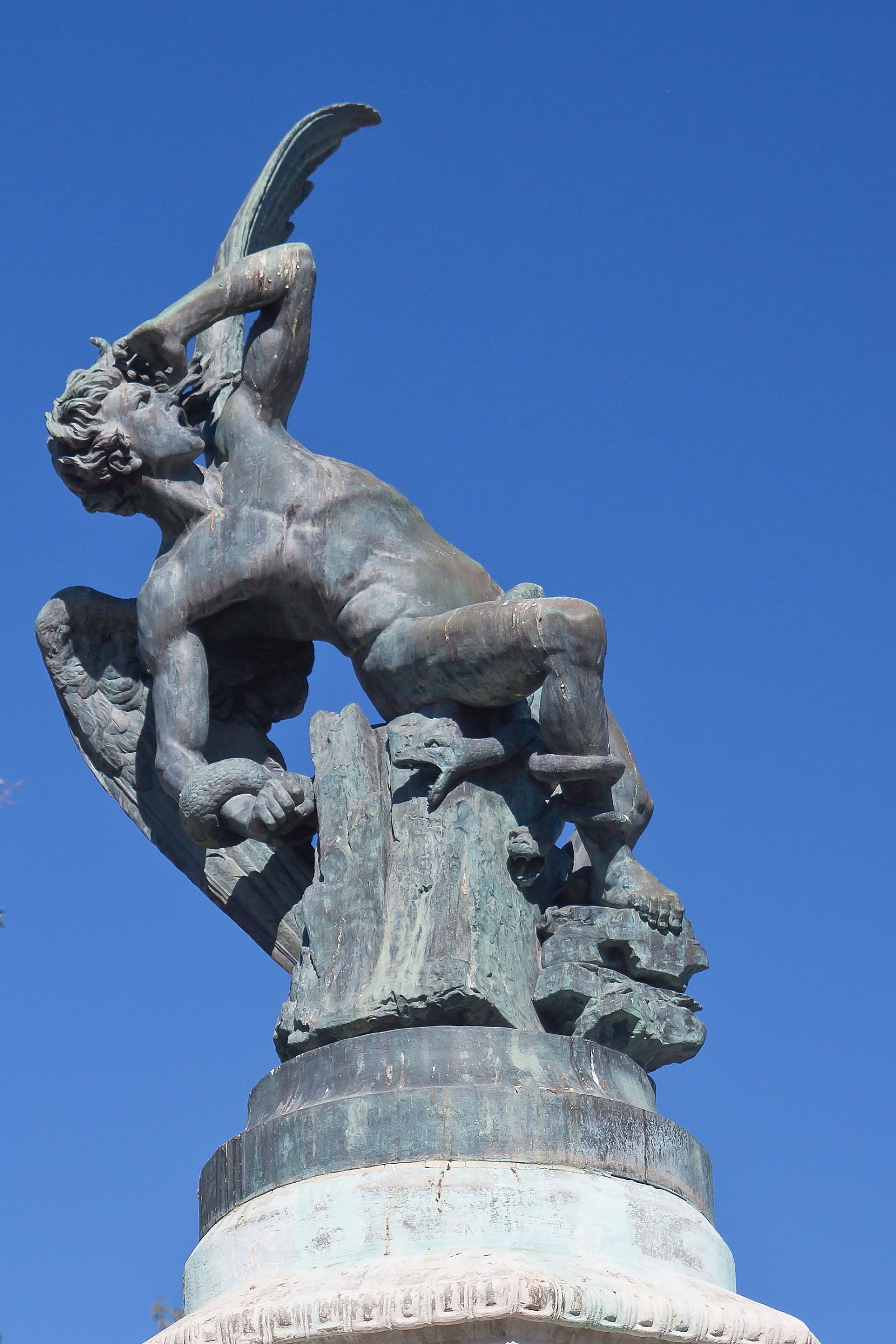
- Artist: Ricardo Bellver (statue); Francisco Jareño (pedestal)
- Medium: Bronze, stone
- Location: Retiro Park, Madrid, Spain

The Fuente del Ángel Caído (Fountain of the Fallen Angel) is a fountain located in the Buen Retiro Park in Madrid, Spain. Its sculptors were Ricardo Bellver (main statue) and Francisco Jareño y Alarcón (pedestal).

== Description ==
The entire fountain is 7 metres high, the statue itself measuring 2.65 metres. Its diameter is 10 metres long and it is surrounded by a parterre. The sculpture is placed at its centre on top of an octagonal pedestal, which is decorated on each side by figures representing demons gripping fishes, lizards and snakes.

Currently, the fountain lies in the middle of a roundabout named after the statue, in the Buen Retiro Park, giving its name to one of the park's entrances too. It stands at 666 metres above sea level.

There is a polyester resin replica of Bellver's work at the Museum of the Real Academia de Bellas Artes de San Fernando in Madrid where details can be better appreciated.

== History ==
The statue that crowns the monument is the masterpiece of Ricardo Bellver, who realized it in plaster in 1877 during his 3rd year as a pensioner in Rome, inspired by verses from Paradise Lost of John Milton (Canto I). He submitted it to the 1877 edition of the Exposiciones Nacionales de Bellas Artes, where it received the first prize. The Spanish state acquired the work and displayed it at the 1878 Exposition Universelle. Since only works in marble and bronze were accepted, the statue was cast in bronze for this occasion and the original plaster was destroyed.

The statue returned to Spain to what was then the Museo Nacional de Pintura y Escultura (also known as the Museo de la Trinidad, now part of the Museo del Prado). The director of the museum, Benito Soriano Murillo, proposed its relocation to the open space so that the public could freely enjoy the sculpture. The statue became property of the city hall, which placed it on its current location in the Retiro park, on a site that was formerly occupied by the Real Fábrica de Porcelanas de la China before its destruction during the French invasion in 1813.

The duque de Fernán Nuñez (probably Manuel Falcó y d´Adda y Valcárcel, the husband of the III Duquesa de Fernán Núñez) sponsored the monument. The architect Francisco Jareño was charged with the design of the pedestal. The monument was finally inaugurated by the Queen consort of Spain Maria Christina of Austria in 1885.

== Reception ==
While the work, turned over by a student, initially received its share of criticisms, it was mainly highly received by the critics and is now an attraction of the Spanish capital. It is renowned for its dramatic appeal, the tension in the expression and its ambiguity in treating a polemical subject that caused turmoil regarding its possible interpretation as a satanic tribute. It has a reputation for being the only prominent sculpture dedicated to the devil.

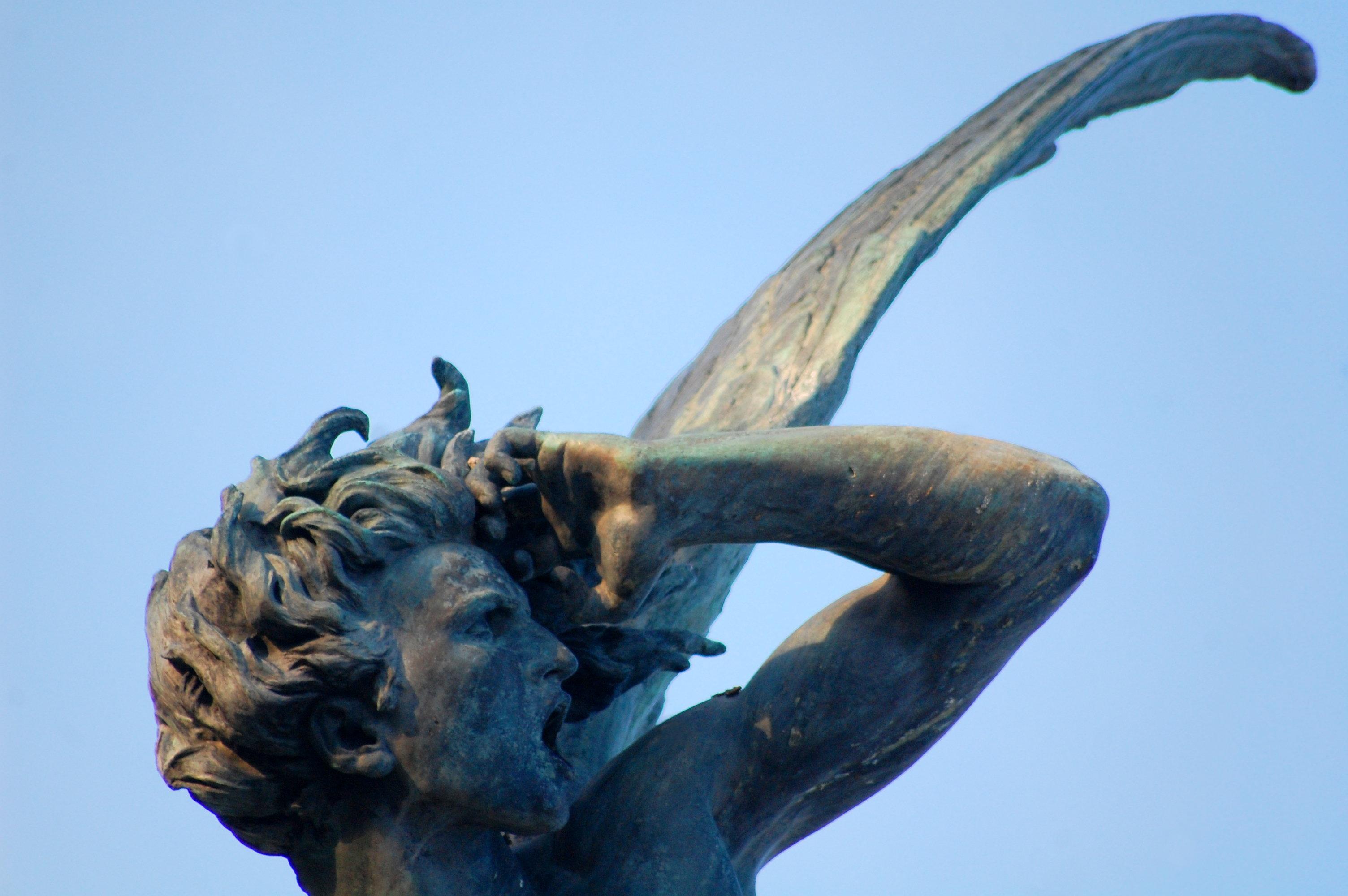
Detail of the statue

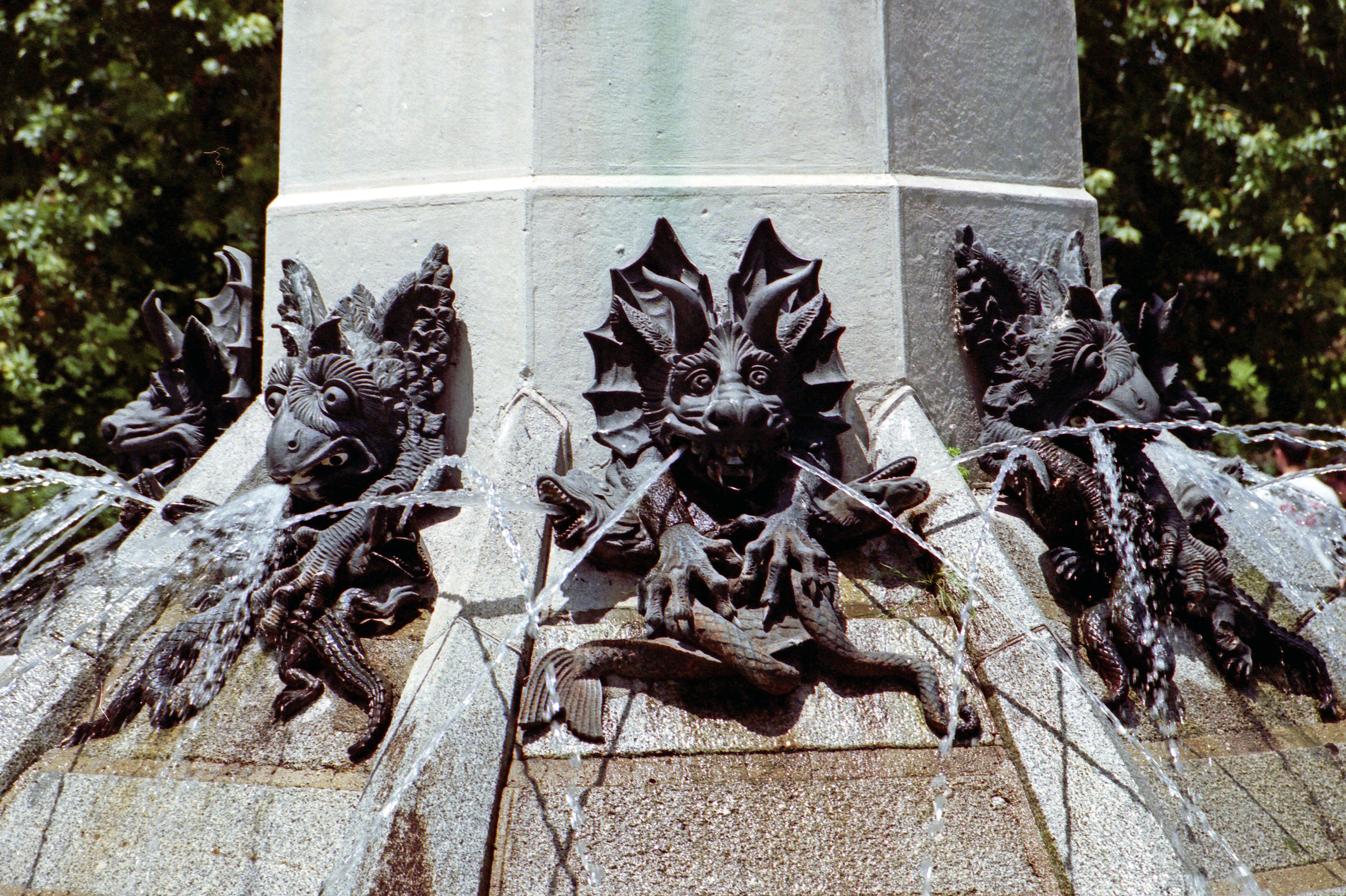
The pedestal of the fountain with statues of demons, lizards, fishes and snakes

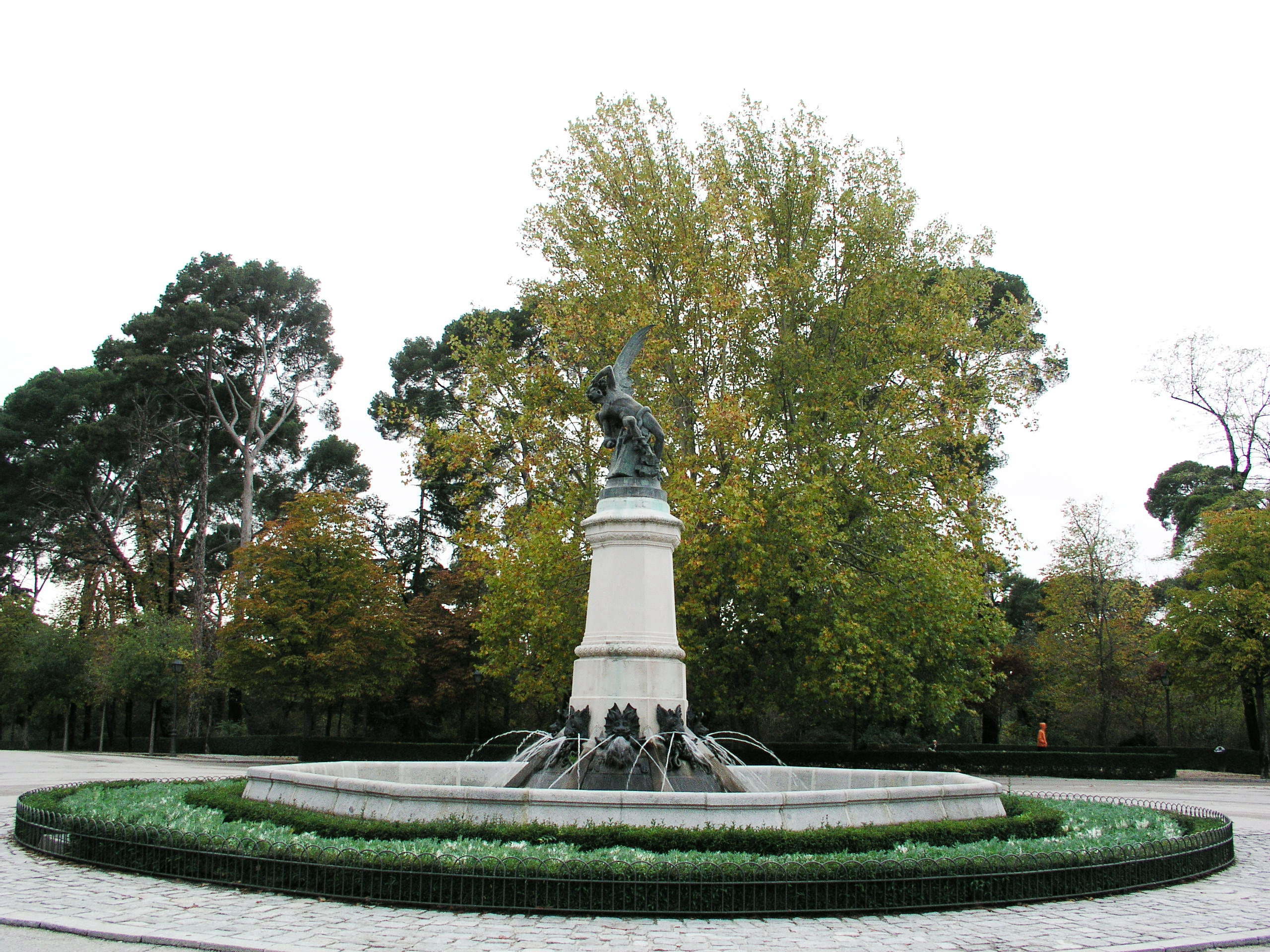
General view of the fountain
