= Juan Martínez Silíceo =

Spanish Roman Catholic bishop, cardinal and mathematician

His Eminence Juan Martínez Silíceo
- Archbishop of Toledo; Primate of Spain
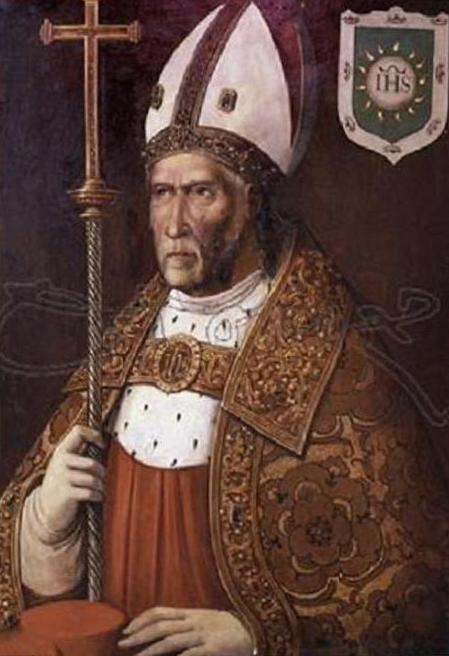
- Church: Catholic Church
- Archdiocese: Toledo
- Appointed: 8 January 1546
- Term ended: 31 May 1557
- Predecessor: Juan Pardo de Tavera
- Successor: Bartolomé Carranza
- Other posts: Cardinal-Priest of Santi Nereo e Achilleo (1556-1557)
- Previous posts: Bishop of Cartagena (1541-1546)

Orders
- Consecration: 1541
- Created cardinal: 20 December 1555 by Pope Paul IV
- Rank: Cardinal-Priest

Personal details
- Born: Juan García de Loaysa y Mendoza; 1486 Villagarcía de la Torre, Spain
- Died: 31 May 1557 (aged 70–71) Toledo, Spain
- Buried: Real Colegio de Doncellas Nobles
- Coat of arms

Juan Martínez Silíceo (1486–1557) was a Spanish Roman Catholic bishop, cardinal and mathematician.

== Biography ==
Juan Martínez Silíceo was born in Villagarcía de la Torre in 1486, the son of Juan Martínez Guijeno, a poor laborer, and Juana Muñoz. His last name is also given as Guijarro.

Martínez studied grammar in Llerena, a small town near Villagarcía de la Torre, and then studied philosophy in Seville. To support himself, he served as a sacristan in the parish church in his home town. He then became the tutor of two sons of a gentleman in Valencia. He then moved on to the University of Paris to complete his studies. Afterwards, he became professor of moral philosophy at the Colegio de San Bartolomé, University of Salamanca.

After he was ordained as a priest, he became a professor of Christian theology. He then became the canon theologian of the cathedral chapter of the Cathedral of Coria. In July 1534, he was named tutor to Philip, Prince of Asturias, later becoming the prince's almoner and confessor.

On 23 February 1541 he was elected Bishop of Cartagena; he was consecrated as a bishop later that year. (He did not, however, enter his see until 1544.) In 1543, Prince Philip despatched him to Badajoz to retrieve the prince's fiancée, Maria Manuela, Princess of Portugal. On 8 January 1546 he was promoted to the metropolitan see of Toledo.

Pope Paul IV made him a cardinal priest in the consistory of 20 December 1555. He received the red hat and the titular church of Santi Nereo e Achilleo on 1 February 1556. He became a renowned mathematician for his time after publishing "Arithmética", firstly printed in Paris and afterwards all across Spain. Apart from "Arithmética" he also publish "Arte calculatorio".

He died in Toledo on 31 May 1557. He was buried in the church of the Colegio de Doncellas Nobles, a girls' school he had founded in Toledo.

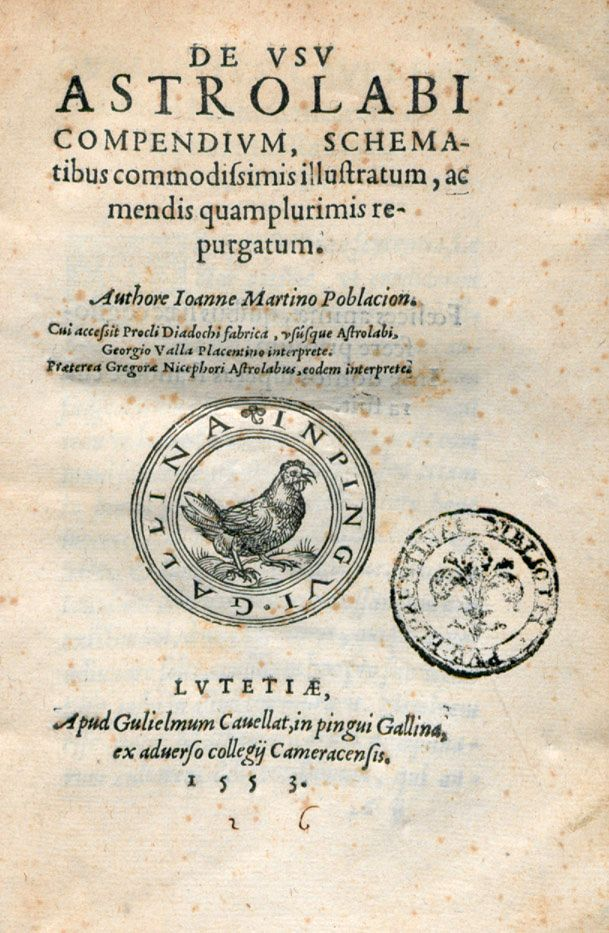
De usu astrolabi compendium, 1553

== Limpieza de sangre Statutes and Anti-Semitism ==
Siliceo successfully fought to impose the limpieza de sangre ("purity of blood") statutes on the Archdiocese of Toledo in order to exclude the Conversos, those Spaniards descended from Jews who had converted to Catholicism, from holding official positions within the Church hierarchy. He used both theological and racial arguments in order to convince Charles V, King of Spain as well as the Pope to approve the rules. Leon Poliakov, a French scholar of Anti-Semitism, describes Siliceo as precursor of modern anti-semitic ideas: the idea that Christ appeared among the Jews because of their "perversity" and "as to the Jewish origins of the Mother of God, the theology of Siliceo simply ignored them...anticipating the 'Aryan Christ' of Nazi theology."

== Works ==
- De usu astrolabi compendium (in Latin). Paris: Guillaume Cavellat. 1553.
