= Real Colegio de Doncellas Nobles =

Building in Toledo, Spain

Coordinates: 39.8589°N 4.0294°W

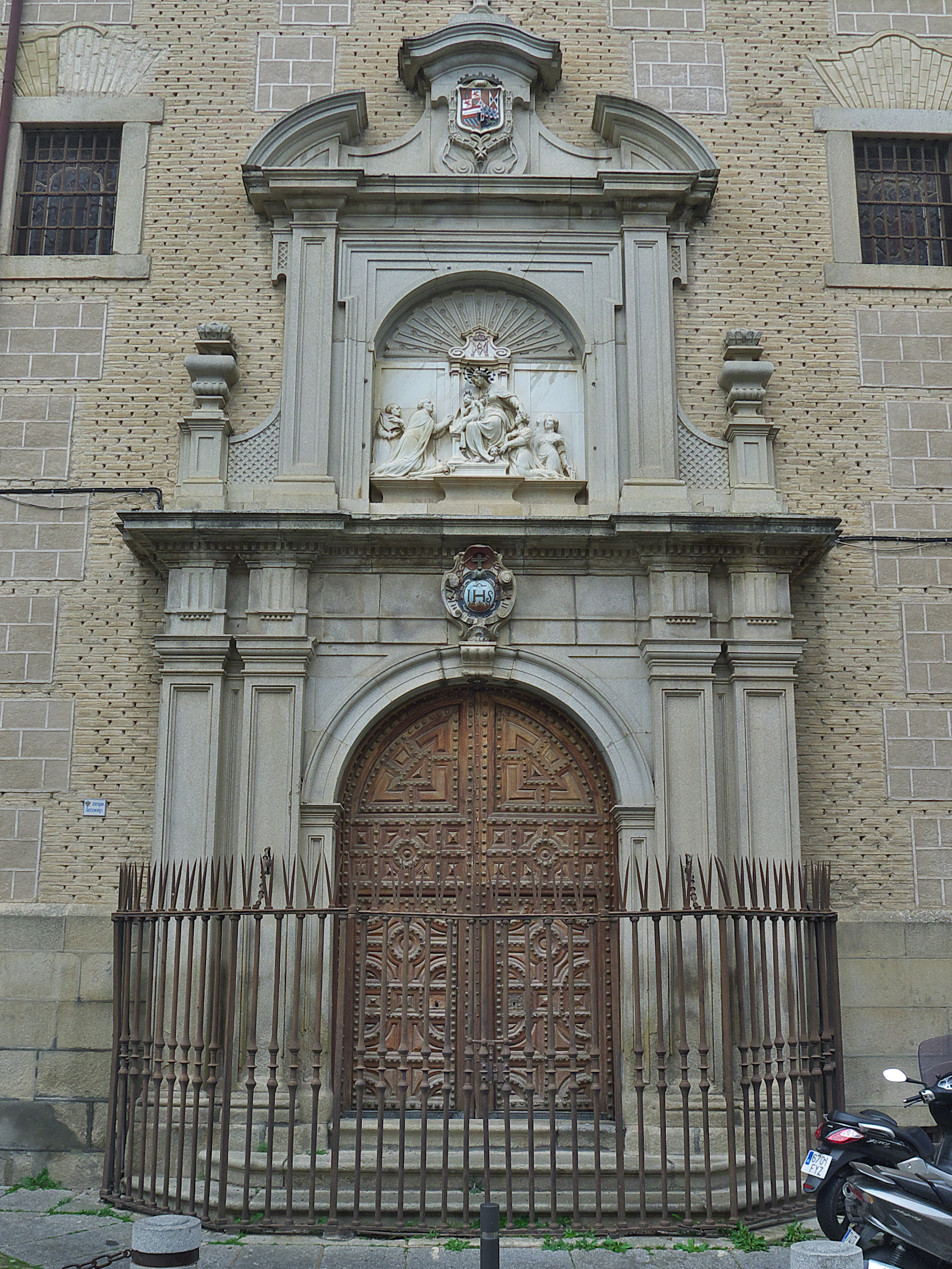
Portal of the church of the college.

The Colegio de Doncellas Nobles is a former girls' school in Toledo (Castile-La Mancha, Spain). It was founded in 1551 by the archbishop of Toledo and cardinal Juan Martínez Silíceo. The project, which had as its patron the king Philip II as well as the archbishop, had as its object the education of young women to be good mothers. Some came from humble families (proposed by the archbishop) and others from noble families from all over Europe (proposed by the king). They were expected to be of "clean blood". Funding was provided for the dowries of former pupils.

The college encountered financial problems after some of its endowments were confiscated in the 19th century, but it expanded around 1900. In 1990 it became a University Residence. The building is included in the list of Royal Sites of the Spanish heritage organisation Patrimonio Nacional.

== Buildings ==
To provide accommodation for his new college the Archbishop acquired houses from Diego Hurtado de Mendoza y de la Cerda, prince Mélito. In the 17th century the building underwent restorations, and at the end of the 18th century new works were realized, paid for by the cardinal Lorenzana and directed by Ventura Rodríguez, who respected the original characteristics of the construction of the 16th century: a structure organized around a narrow courtyard with granite columns, two elongated rooms, located on the opposite sides of the courtyard, and wide stairs to the upper floor.

When the college needed to expand its construction, being then its director Luis Fernández de Lara, it was thought in a plot near property of the college, where existed two old houses. Communicated with the existing building and in this plot is built, between 1900 and 1903, a building designed by the architect Santiago Castellanos.

== Description ==
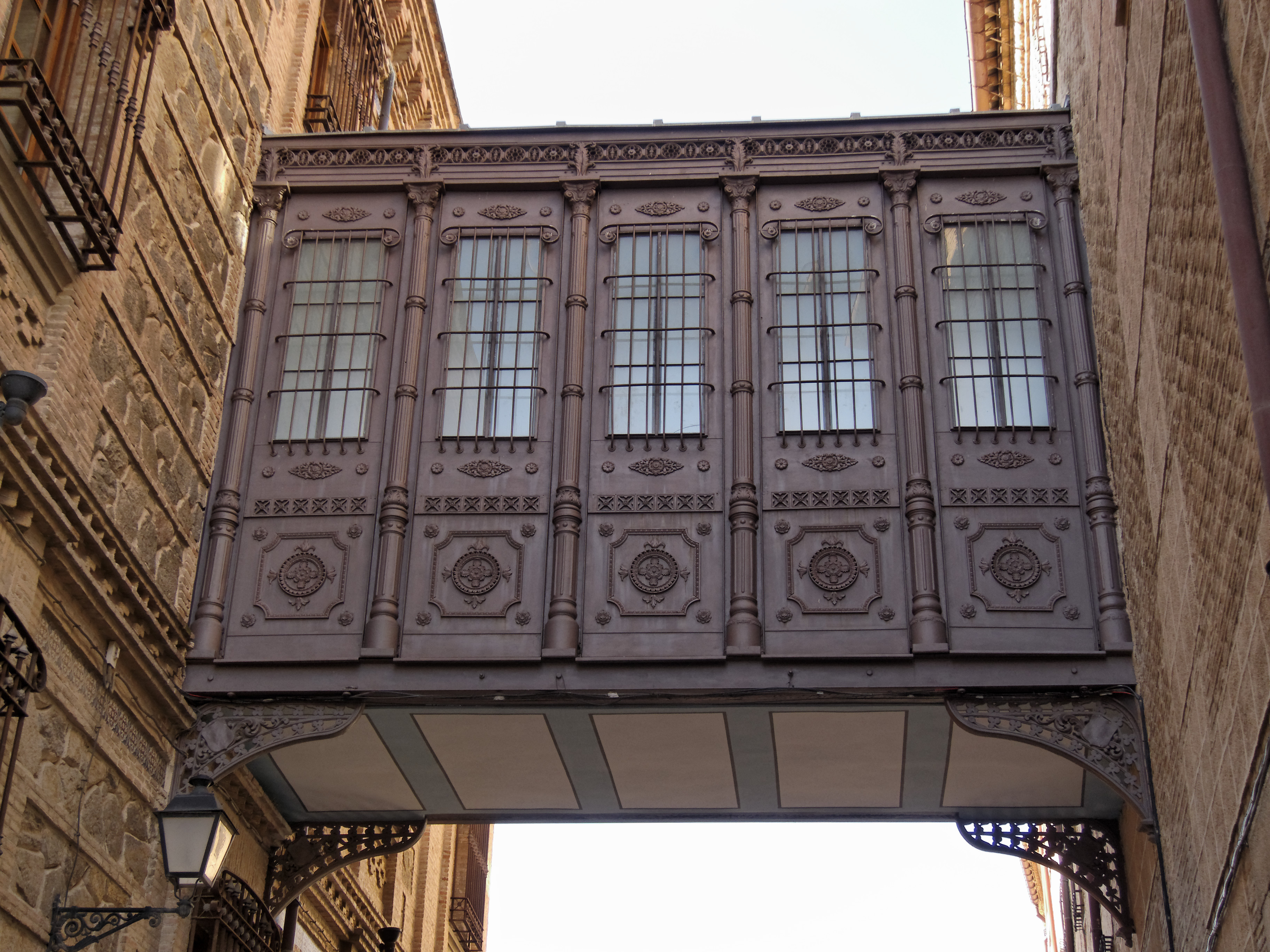
Elevated passageway that communicates the primitive building with the enlargement.

It is a building of square plant with chamfered corners, rear garden and interior courtyard. In some of its points it has four plants.

The whole building rests on a basement of granite stone that serves as base to the brick canvases. The exterior spans retain a symmetrical composition and are repeated with some equidistance and rhythm. These are lined and protected by bars. Among them are the multiple geometric combinations of the bricks, which become the basis of the decoration. Horizontal lines composed of decorated ceramic tiles are introduced.

The building has in its treatments a Neo-Mudéjar historicist character. Constructively it is realized with metallic structure, which becomes evident in singular elements, like the elevated passage that communicates the primitive building with this enlargement, where the roblonada structure is evidenced. These solutions also stand out in the covered galleries of the inner courtyard.

The main facade, oriented at noon, has two front doors, one entrance to the college and the other that gives way to the church. The first is of Doric order, in ashlar, with royal shield, and another with the arms of the founder. The second has two bodies: the lower one, with a half-point span framed by four pilasters in Doric order, and on which is seen a shield with arms of the Cardinal Silíceo. Both portals are Baroque classicists.

In the place of the old main hall, there is now the church-chapel of the college. It consists of a nave covered by a barrel vaulted ceiling with lunettes, cruise on pendentives and flat plateau. It has a main altarpiece with canvas of the Virgin of the Remedies, titular of the college. To the sides of the nave Baroque altarpieces, with the virgin Virgen del Pozo and Saint Jerome. At the foot of the church is the choir of chaplains and in the upper floor, guarded with grating, the choir of schoolgirls, with vault of edges.

== Access ==
Since 2016 it is open to sightseeing, thanks to an agreement between Patrimonio Nacional and the Archbishopric of Toledo. Visits are managed by the Archbishopric.
