= Francisco Jareño y Alarcón =

Spanish architect (1818–1892)

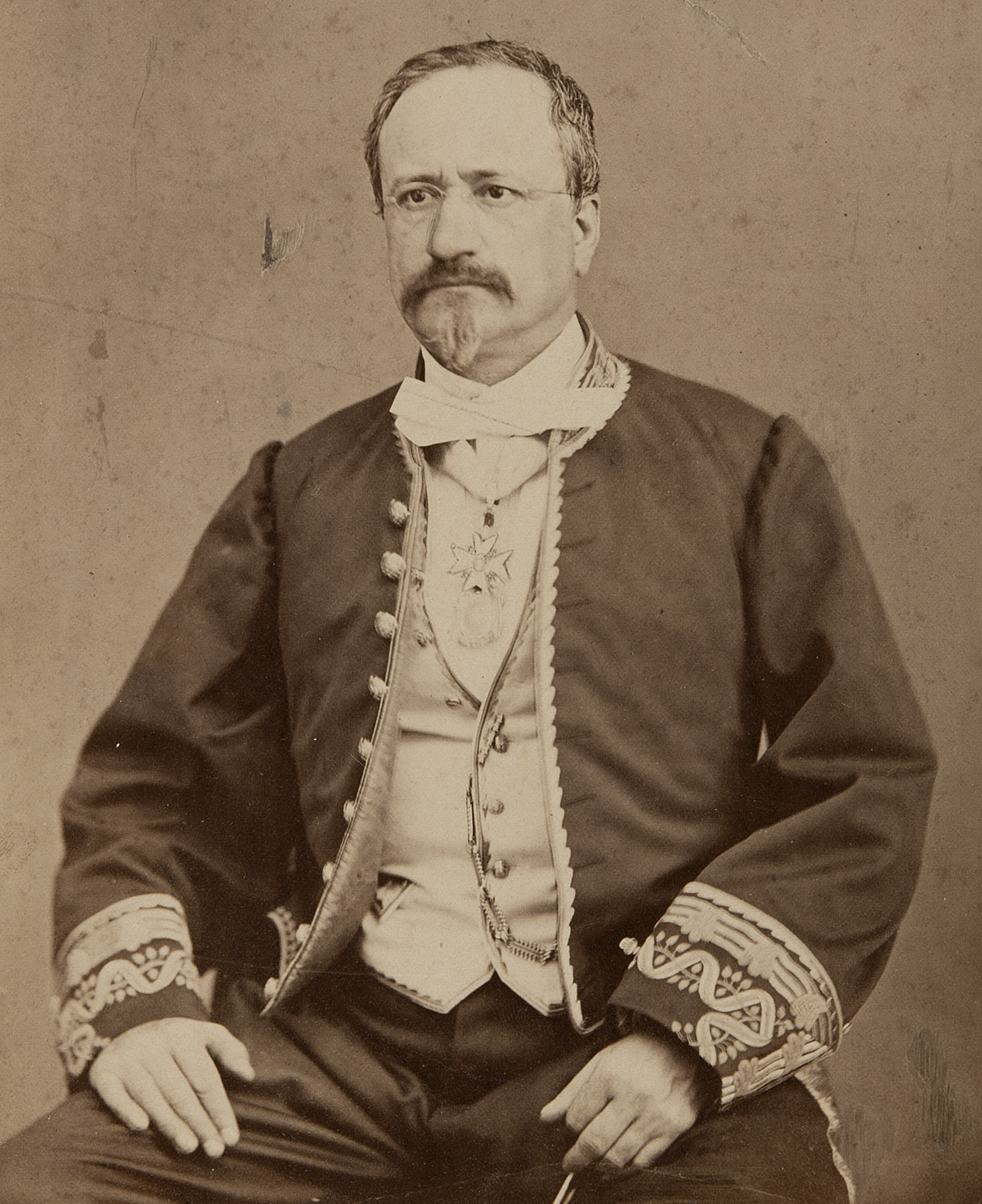
- Jareño y Alarcón in 1870
- Born: 24 February 1818; Albacete
- Died: 8 October 1892 (aged 74); Madrid
- Occupation: Architect

Francisco Jareño y Alarcón (24 February 1818 – 8 October 1892) was a Spanish architect, author of one of the most remarkable official buildings of the Reign of Isabella II of Spain.

== Life ==
Jareño was born in Albacete on 24 February 1818. He entered the diocesan seminary as a young man to pursue ecclesiastical studies, remaining there for nine years. In 1833 he left it to enter the Real Academia de Bellas Artes de San Fernando in Madrid, where he graduated in 1848, at the age of thirty, after completing a brilliant academic career. Thanks to a scholarship, Jareño had the opportunity to go abroad and travel, over a period of four years, to various countries in Europe. He had the opportunity to learn about how iron was used as an architectural element in several European cities. Upon his return, and with new financial aid from the State, he would travel to England and Germany again. He returned to Madrid in 1855, where he was appointed Professor of Art History at the then Special School of Architecture.

Of his first years of practice, the project of the Central School of Agriculture of Aranjuez of 1856 stands out, the first work that is known of Jareño, as well as the intervention, in collaboration with Nicómedes Mendívil, in the disappeared Spanish Mint, built in the space that today occupies the Plaza de Colón (Madrid). Between 1874 and 1875 he was director of the School of Architects, as well as a permanent academic of the Royal Academy of San Fernando (1867), Knight of the Royal and Distinguished Order of Carlos III (1858), Grand Cross of the Civil Order of María Victoria (1872), among others.

== Works ==
=== In Madrid ===
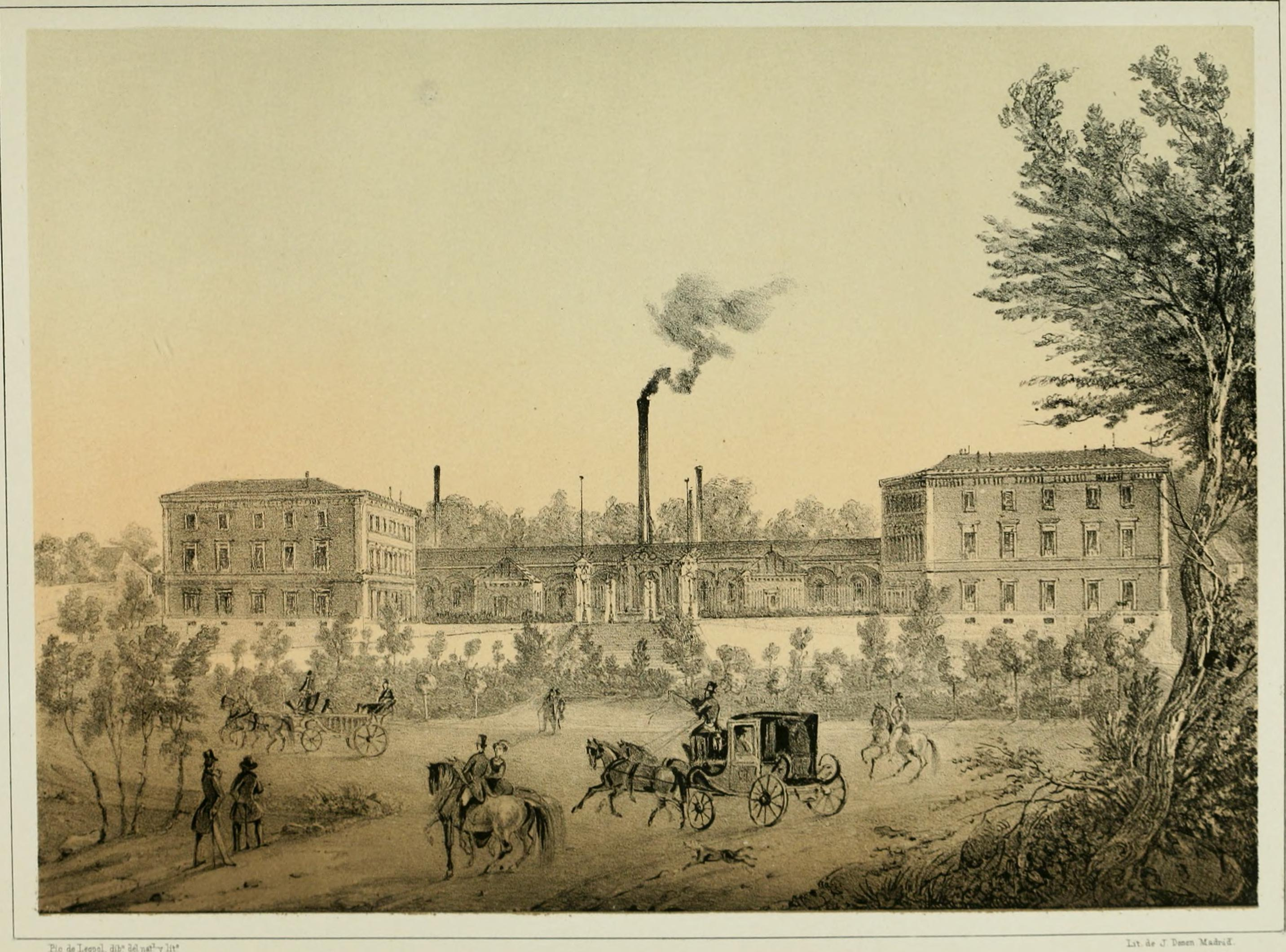
Spanish Mint

- Mint (1856-1861), disappeared in 1970 to build the Plaza de Colón.
- National Museum, Archive and Library Palace (1865-1868), which houses the headquarters of the Archaeological Museum and the National Library, is considered the largest work designed by Jareño.
- IES San Isidro (1876), extension and reform of the Old Nobles Seminary building from 1679.
- Former headquarters of the Veterinary School (1877), headquarters since 1959 of the Cervantes secondary school.
- Cardenal Cisneros Secondary School (1877), the first extension to house the Institute in the building of the old Central University of Madrid (1842).
- Court of Auditors (Spain) (1860), with subsequent reforms, rectifications and the addition of an attic on the original cornice.
- Hospital del Niño Jesús (1879), commissioned by the Duchess of Santoña for which it obtained much international recognition.
- The first kindergarten created in Spain (1879), located at the corner of Calle Daoíz and Plaza del Dos de Mayo, next to what was the Normal School of Teachers.

=== Outside Madrid ===
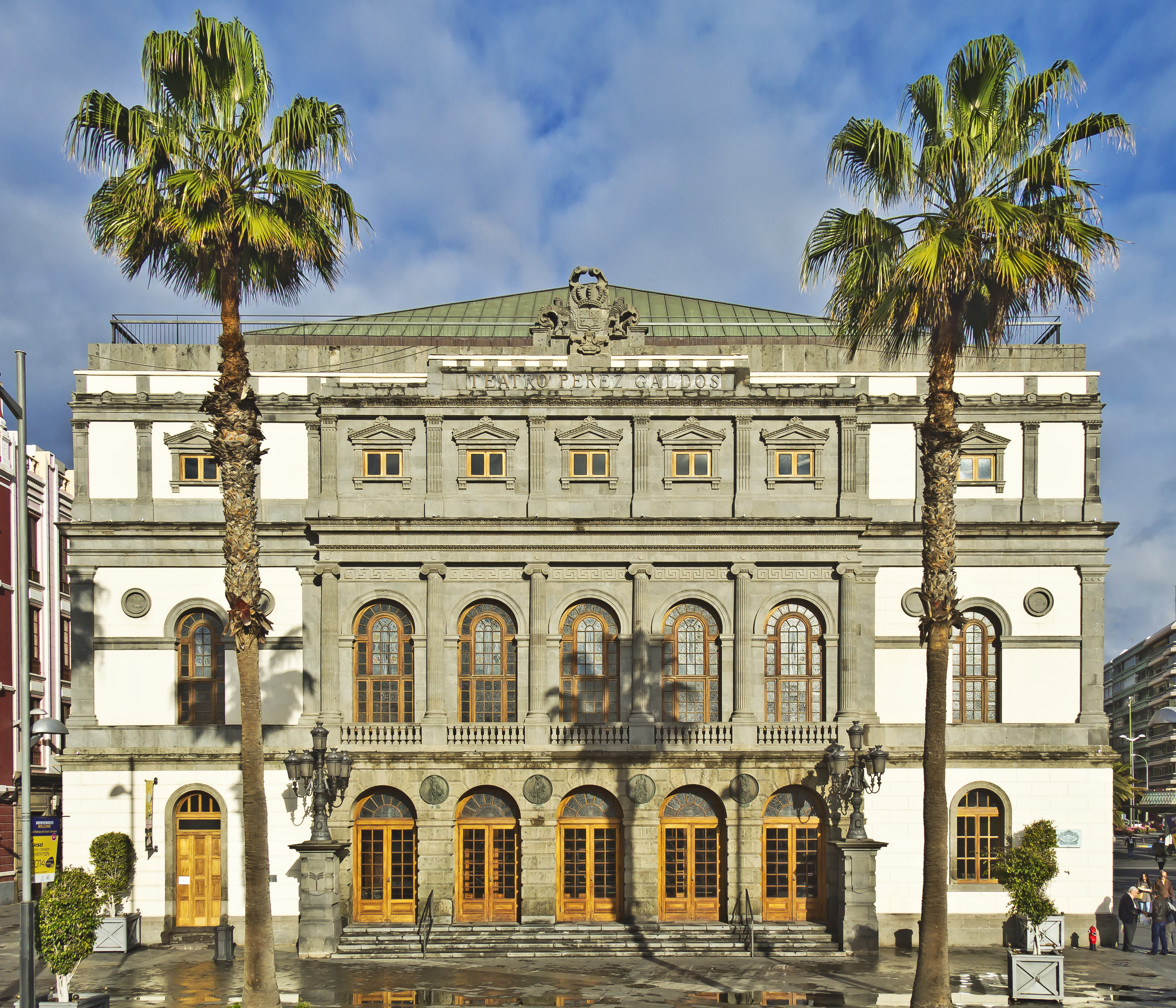
Pérez Galdós Theater

- Pérez Galdós Theater
- Central School of Agriculture (Aranjuez, 1856), the first known work of the architect.
- Rehabilitation of the Territorial Court of Albacete (1857).
- Bullring of Toledo, 1865. In Arab style, which replaced the Plaza de Zocodover for the celebration of bullfights.
- Tirso de Molina Theater, today the Pérez Galdós Theater (Las Palmas de Gran Canaria, 1867). Devastated by a fire in 1918, subsequent renovations have not been faithful to the original concept, respecting only the facade.

== Memberships ==
- Royal Academy of Fine Arts of San Fernando
- Royal Matritense Economic Society of Friends of the Country

== Honors ==
- Order of Isabella the Catholic
- Exposición Universal de París (1855)
- National Exhibition of Fine Arts (Spain) (1856)
- Order of Charles III (1858)
- Grand Cross of the Civil Order of María Victoria (1872)
- Order of the Crown of Prussia (1877)

== Sources ==
- "Francisco Jareño y Alarcón" (PDF), Dos apuntes biográficos (in Spanish), Biblioteca Nacional de Espana, archived from the original (PDF) on 2016-03-03
- Preckler, Ana María (2003), Historia del arte universal del los siglos XIX y XX (in Spanish), vol. 1
