= Reign of Alfonso XII =

History of Spain from 1874 to 1885

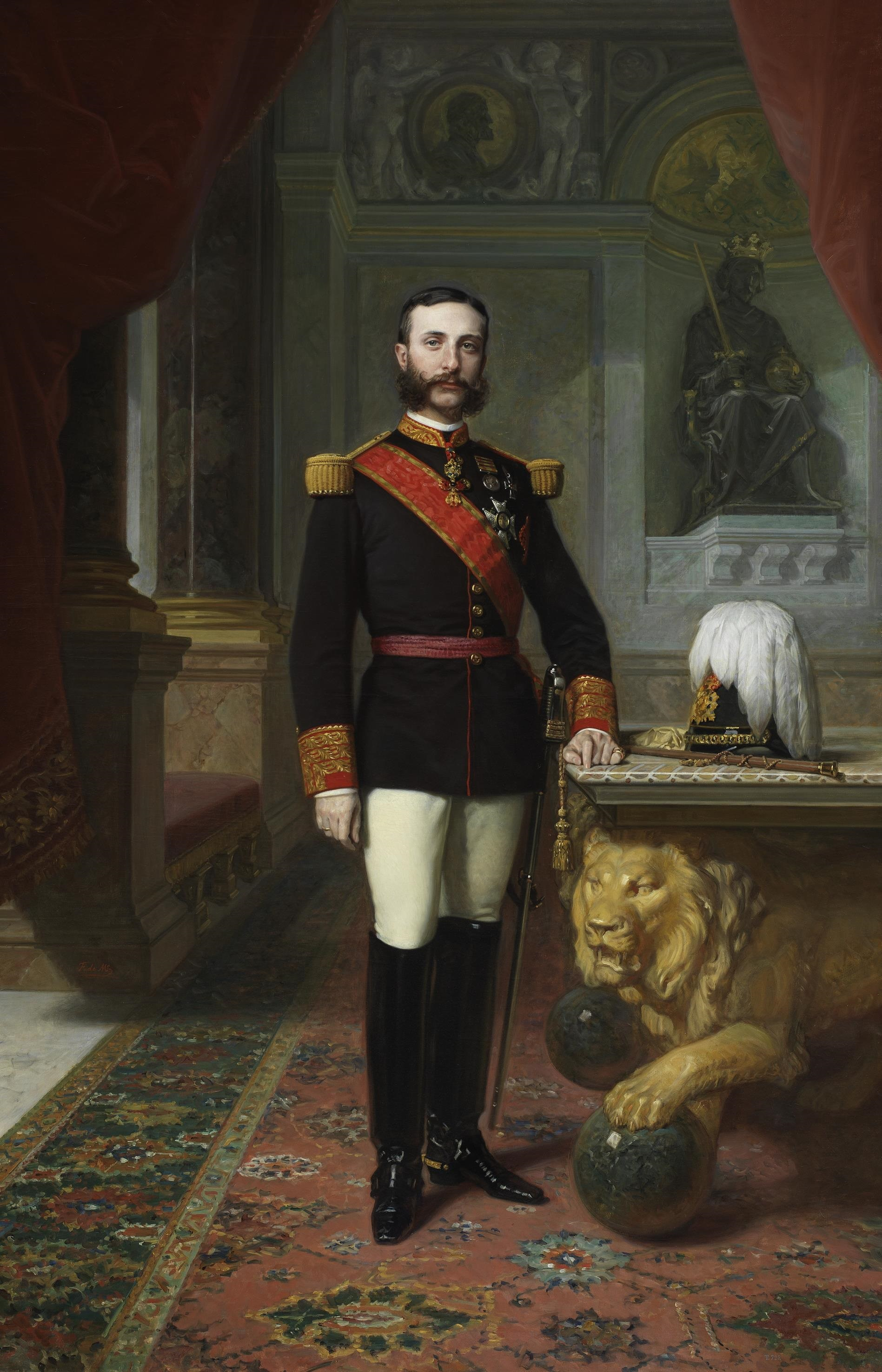
Official portrait of Alfonso XII by Federico Madrazo shortly before the king's death in November 1885 (Museo del Prado, Madrid).

The reign of Alfonso XII of Spain began after the Pronunciamiento de Sagunto on December 29, 1874, which ended the First Spanish Republic. It lasted until his death on November 25, 1885, after which his wife, María Cristina of Habsburg, assumed the Regency. During his reign, the political regime of the Restoration was established, based on the Spanish Constitution of 1876, which remained in effect until 1923. The regime was a constitutional monarchy, though neither democratic nor parliamentary, described by supporters as liberal and by critics, particularly regenerationists, as oligarchic. Its foundations were based on doctrinaire liberalism, as noted by Ramón Villares.

Carlos Dardé described the reign as brief but significant, with Spain's situation improving in various areas by its end. Despite uncertainty following the king’s death, the improvements continued under María Cristina's regency during the minority of her son, Alfonso XIII. The foundations of the liberal regime were solidified during this period.

The reign saw economic growth, driven by the expansion of the railway network, foreign investments, the mining boom, and increased agricultural exports, especially wine, due to the phylloxera plague devastating French vineyards. The nobility and high bourgeoisie benefited most from this growth, forming a "power bloc" intertwined with the political elite. Meanwhile, Spain remained largely agrarian, with two-thirds of the population working in the primary sector and a small middle class, while millions of poor laborers, especially in the south, lived in poverty.

== Background ==
=== Exile and abdication of Isabella II to her son Alfonso (1868-1873) ===
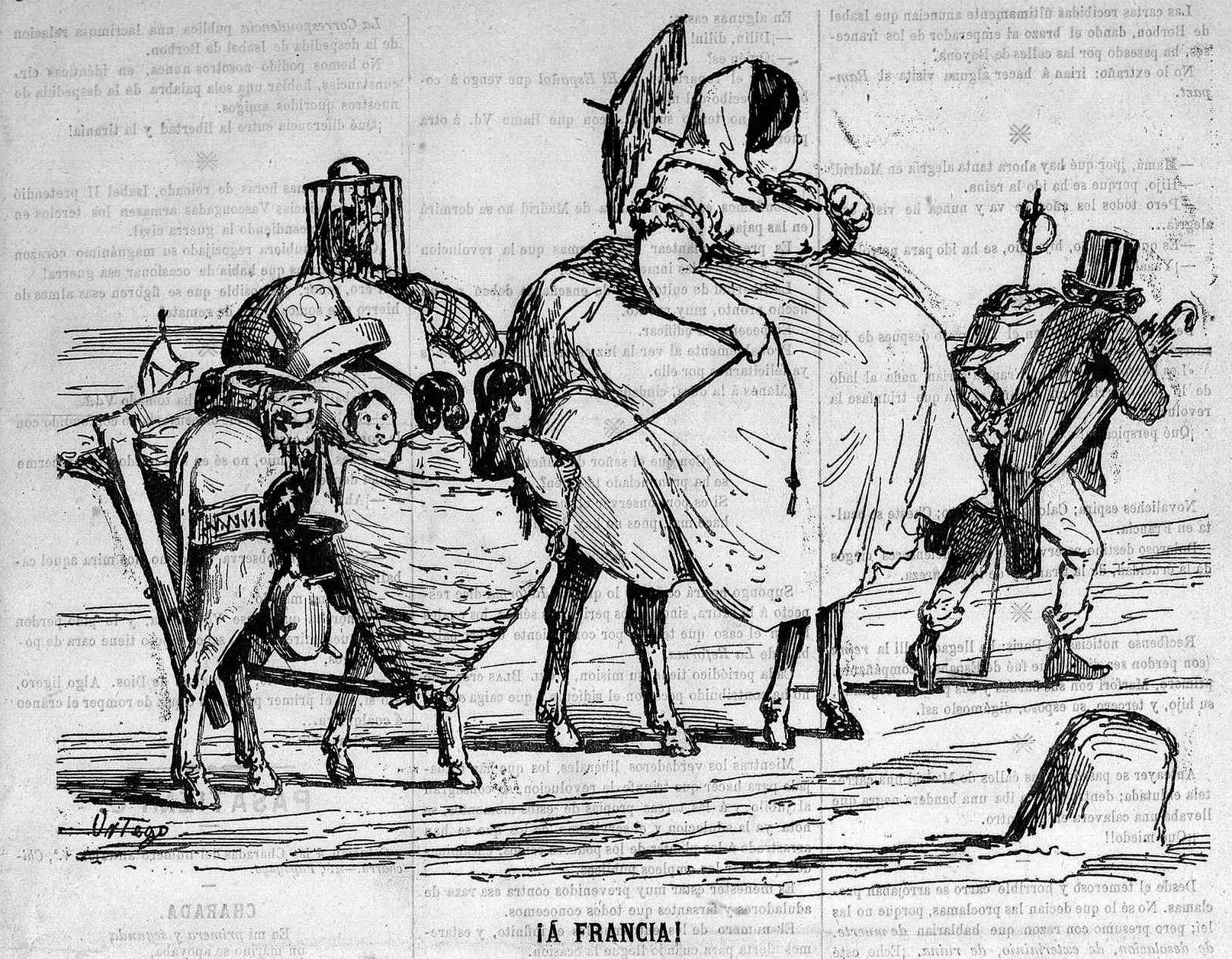
Caricature published by the satirical magazine Gil Blas on October 4, 1868, four days after Queen Isabella II was forced to go into exile

The Glorious Revolution of September 1868 ended the reign of Isabella II and began the Sexenio Democrático. The queen, who was in San Sebastian, fled Spain and went into exile in France under the protection of Emperor Napoleon III, accompanied by her daughters and her son, Alfonso, the Prince of Asturias. They settled in the Basilewsky Palace in Paris, which Isabella renamed the Palace of Castile. Prince Alfonso was enrolled in the prestigious Stanislas School, where his political education was guided by his tutor, Guillermo Morphy.

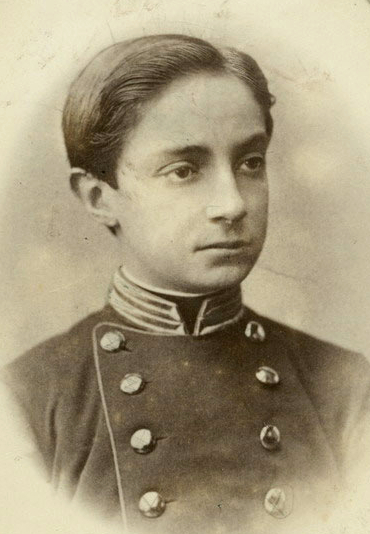
Prince Alfonso de Borbón, aged twelve.

In February 1870, the prince traveled to Rome to receive his first communion from Pius IX. However, the pope did not publicly recognize the Bourbon dynasty as the legitimate heirs to the Spanish throne or condemn the "revolutionary regime" in Spain, as Isabella had hoped. Instead, of the 43 Spanish bishops attending the First Vatican Council, 39 visited the prince, and Cardinal Juan Ignacio Moreno y Maisonave, prepared him for the Eucharist.

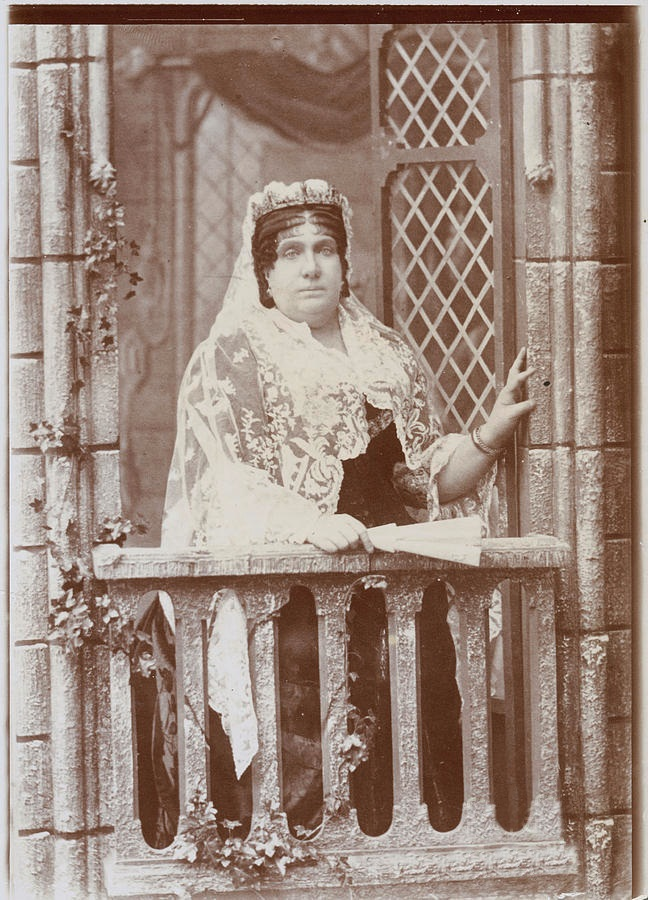
The ex-queen Isabella II around 1870, in her exile in Paris.

Meanwhile, in Madrid, a Provisional Government led by General Serrano called elections to the Constituent Courts, which approved a new "democratic" Constitution in June 1869. General Serrano assumed the Regency while General Prim, who was tasked with finding a candidate for the Spanish throne, served as president of the government.

To advocate for her restoration, Isabella appointed Juan de la Pezuela, Count of Cheste, a moderate traditionalist, but he soon resigned after members of the Moderate Party criticized her for surrounding herself with the same people who had contributed to her loss of the throne. Among Bourbon supporters, there was growing support for the idea that the restoration could only occur if Isabella abdicated in favor of her son, Alfonso. Isabella sought consultations on the matter, and while a small group of her close friends and neo-Catholic supporters opposed abdication, most moderates and unionists favored it. Some, like the Marquis of Molins, hoped a new prince would inspire "more hopes than memories". Among those in favor of abdication was a small group of deputies from the Constituent Courts, led by Antonio Cánovas del Castillo, who would later form the Conservative Party of the Restoration. Cánovas suggested to Isabella that it would be advantageous for her dynasty to be represented by a new, well-educated prince, detached from the current political turmoil.

Abdication of Isabella II.

I have come to abdicate freely and spontaneously, without any kind of coercion or violence, driven solely by My love for Spain and its fortune and independence, from the royal authority that I exercised by the grace of God and the Constitution of the Spanish Monarchy promulgated in the year 1845, and to abdicate also all My merely political rights, transmitting them with all those that correspond to the succession of the Crown of Spain to My beloved Son Don Alfonso, Prince of Asturias.

Isabella II took a year to decide on her abdication, resisting pressure during this time. On June 20, 1870, she abdicated the throne in favor of her twelve-year-old son Alfonso in a ceremony held at the Palace of Castile. The abdication was prompted by the willingness of Prussian Prince Leopold of Hohenzollern-Sigmaringen to accept the Spanish throne, following a proposal from General Prim. However, the immediate catalyst was the threat from Napoleon III, who opposed both the Prussian candidacy and the Duke of Montpensier's candidacy, which could have led to war with Prussia and the fall of the French Empire after its defeat in 1870. After the proclamation of the French Republic, Isabella, Alfonso, and the Infantas left Paris for Geneva, where they stayed until August 1871 before returning to France. Prince Alfonso’s education was initially overseen by Tomás O'Ryan, who was replaced by Guillermo Morphy in December 1871.

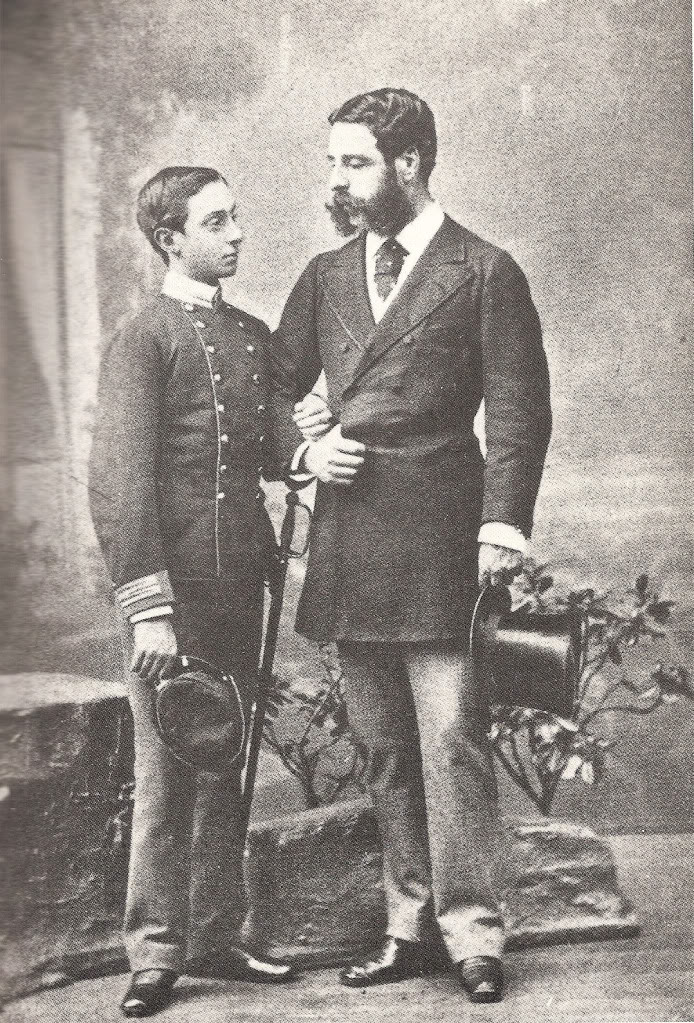
Prince Alfonso with his preceptor, the Duke of Sesto, when he was a student at the Theresianum in Vienna.

With the Prussian option discarded, on November 16, 1870, the Spanish Cortes elected Prince Amadeo of Savoy, second son of the King of Italy, as King Amadeo I. While the Moderate Party advocated for the return to pre-1868 conditions, the small group led by Cánovas remained cautious but eventually supported Alfonso’s cause after the Republic was declared in February 1873. From that point, Cánovas became the chief spokesperson for "Alfonsism".

Isabella II abdicated without appointing a guardian for Prince Alfonso, so she continued in that role until January 1872, when her brother-in-law, the Duke of Montpensier, took over after negotiating terms with Queen María Cristina, whom Isabella had delegated family affairs to. Montpensier’s efforts to secure military support, particularly from General Serrano, were unsuccessful, and he resigned in January 1873. Isabella then regained guardianship over Alfonso. In February 1872, as part of the "Cannes agreement," Alfonso was sent to study at the prestigious Theresianum Academy in Vienna. During a visit to the Montpensier family castle in Randan at Christmas 1872, Alfonso met their daughter, María de las Mercedes, whom he married for love in 1878.

=== Cánovas at the head of the Alfonsina cause (1873-1874) ===
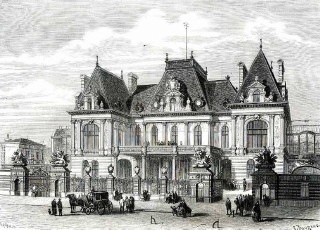
Palace of Castile, residence of the ex-Queen Isabella II in Paris. There she made her abdication in favor of her son Prince Alfonso.

A decisive step toward the Alfonsine restoration occurred on August 22, 1873, amid the cantonal rebellion and shortly after the return of Carlist pretender Carlos VII to Spain, which intensified the third Carlist war. On that date, Isabella II, despite her personal dislike for him, entrusted Antonio Cánovas del Castillo with leadership of the Bourbon dynastic cause. As Carlos Dardé notes, the letter confirming Cánovas’s appointment—signed by both Isabella and Prince Alfonso, per Cánovas’s condition—constituted explicit approval of his conduct during the revolutionary period. Cánovas rejected any politics of revenge and advocated inclusivity. He wrote: “I will not ask the one who comes [to our side] what he has been; it will be enough for me to know what he intends to be.” He believed in using what was valuable from the revolution that had deposed Isabella II and warned that attempting to restore the past would damage the monarchy. As José Varela Ortega observed, for Cánovas, reconciliation was a victory; revenge, a defeat.

Isabella also granted Cánovas full authority over Alfonso’s education. He decided the prince should begin military training to become a "King-soldier" and gain the confidence of the armed forces. Although his preceptor, Guillermo Morphy, resisted the change—arguing the prince should complete his training at the Theresianum in Vienna—Cánovas prevailed, in October 1874, with the agreement of both Alfonso and his mother, Cánovas sent the prince to the British Royal Military Academy of Sandhurst in Britain. Alfonso had preferred university education to better prepare for constitutional rule, but Cánovas believed it was more urgent to immerse him in a constitutional environment. Isabella appeared to embrace Cánovas’s vision that the restoration should rely on uniting all liberal factions, in contrast to the exclusionary politics of her reign. In a letter, she wrote: "Your idea is my idea... without this union of all the parties in the shadow of my son's flag... the ruin of Spain is inevitable." As Isabel Burdiel noted, her support was crucial in convincing the moderates to accept Cánovas's leadership.

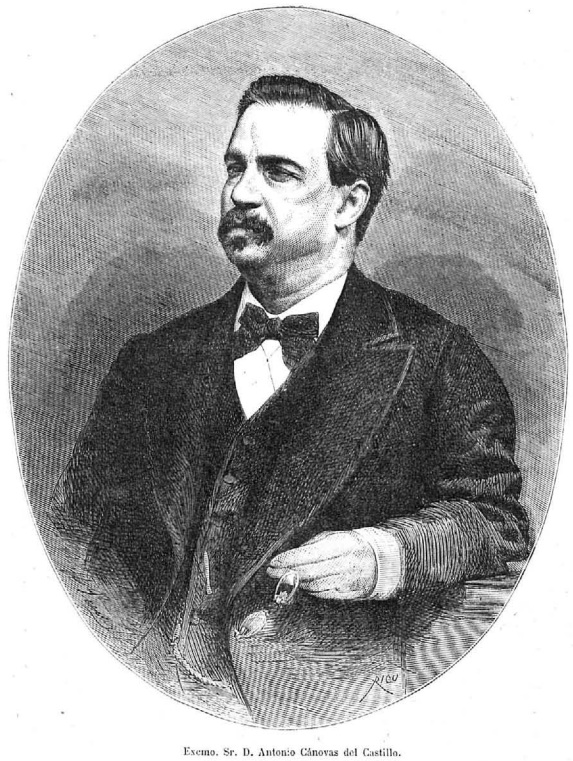
Antonio Cánovas del Castillo in 1872. From August 1873 he headed the "Alfonsina" cause.

The Canovist camp expanded to include former Unionists and even some former revolutionaries of 1868, such as Francisco Romero Robledo. This alliance gained key backing from the social and economic elites, especially business sectors in Catalonia and Madrid with colonial interests. Their support was vital to consolidating the Alfonsine movement. Historian Manuel Suárez Cortina emphasizes that fears sparked by the Parisian Commune and the association of revolution with democracy led conservative forces—including the Army, the Church, and the middle and upper classes—to view Alfonso XII and the Restoration as a path to stability and order, aligned with international trends and elite interests.

Although Cánovas rejected a traditional military pronunciamiento, insisting that the monarchy should return through broad political consensus, he maintained contact with military leaders. As Suárez Cortina explains, Cánovas believed the restoration must be politically prepared, with military intervention playing only a secondary, supportive role once that groundwork was in place.

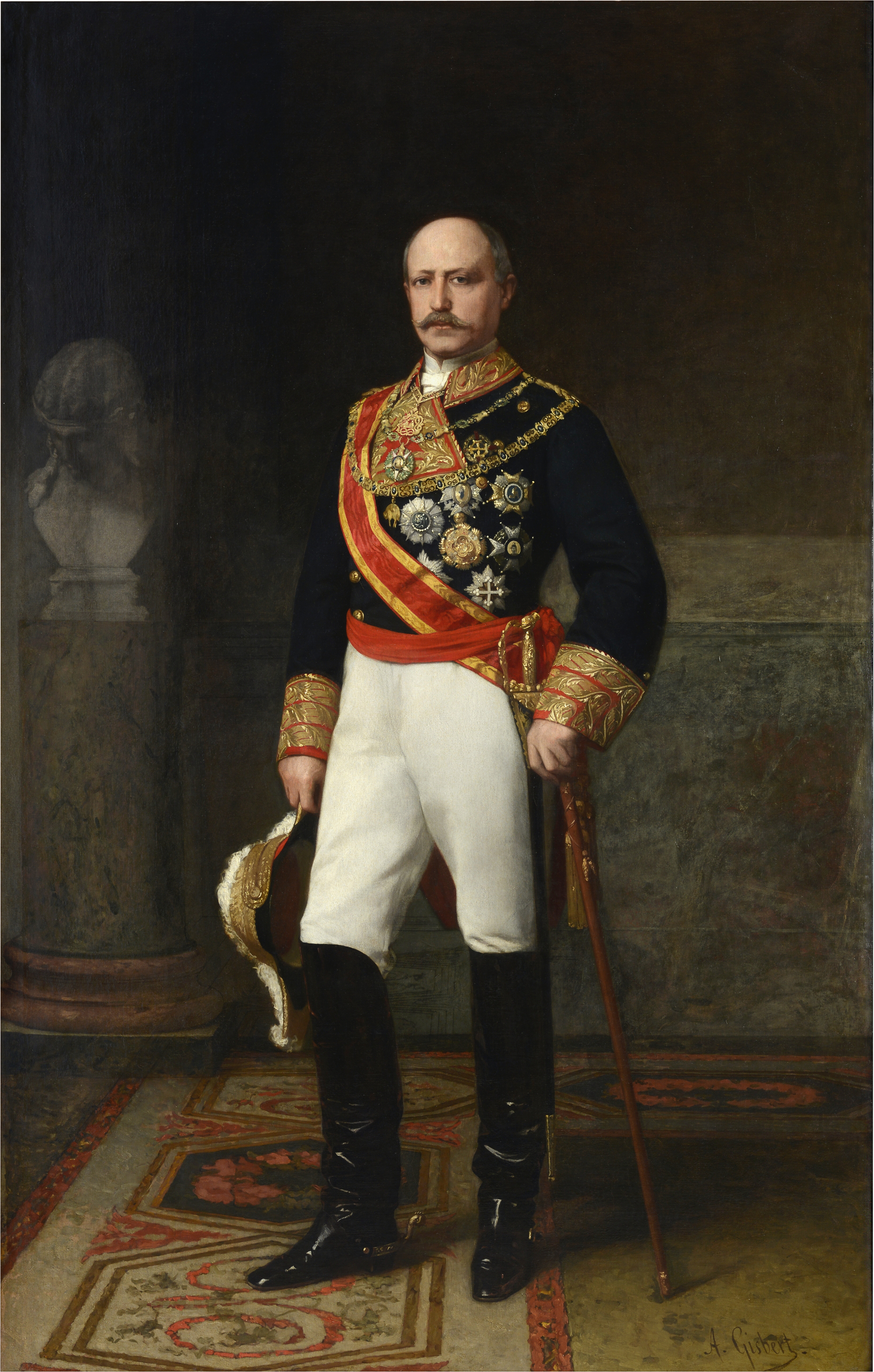
General Serrano, President of the Executive Power of the Republic after the triumph of Pavía's coup on January 2, 1874.

Cánovas del Castillo articulated his strategy for the Bourbon restoration in letters to former Queen Isabella II and Prince Alfonso in January 1874, following the Pavía coup d'état. Some generals associated with the Moderate Party had attempted to use the coup as a pretext to proclaim Alfonso king, but Cánovas dissuaded them. In these letters, he emphasized the need to build strong public support for Alfonso through “calm, serenity, patience, perseverance, and energy". In April, he reiterated to Isabella that they must “prepare opinion broadly” and wait for a spontaneous surge of support—“a surprise, an outburst of opinion”—to seize the opportunity without wasting it.

To shape public opinion, Cánovas promoted the establishment of Alfonsino circles across the country and supported the acquisition of newspapers aligned with the cause, such as La Época in Madrid. According to historian Manuel Suárez Cortina, Alfonsism quickly became fashionable among the clergy, upper-class women, the bourgeoisie, and large sectors of the Army. Social gatherings and salons played a vital role in spreading the movement, a dynamic dubbed by the British ambassador as the “Ladies’ Revolution". Among the key supporters of the Canovist project was the influential Spanish-Cuban lobby, including the so-called slaveholding interest led by the Marquis of Manzanedo. This group, which also included Queen Mother María Cristina—owner of a Cuban sugar plantation—was deeply concerned about the potential abolition of slavery. It maintained a vast network of Spanish-Ultramarine circles and clubs, both in Spain and in Cuba, and had strong ties to the military. This faction, led by figures such as the Count of Valmaseda (a former Captain General of Cuba), played a pivotal role in the conspiracy that culminated in the pronunciamiento of Sagunto, which enabled the restoration.

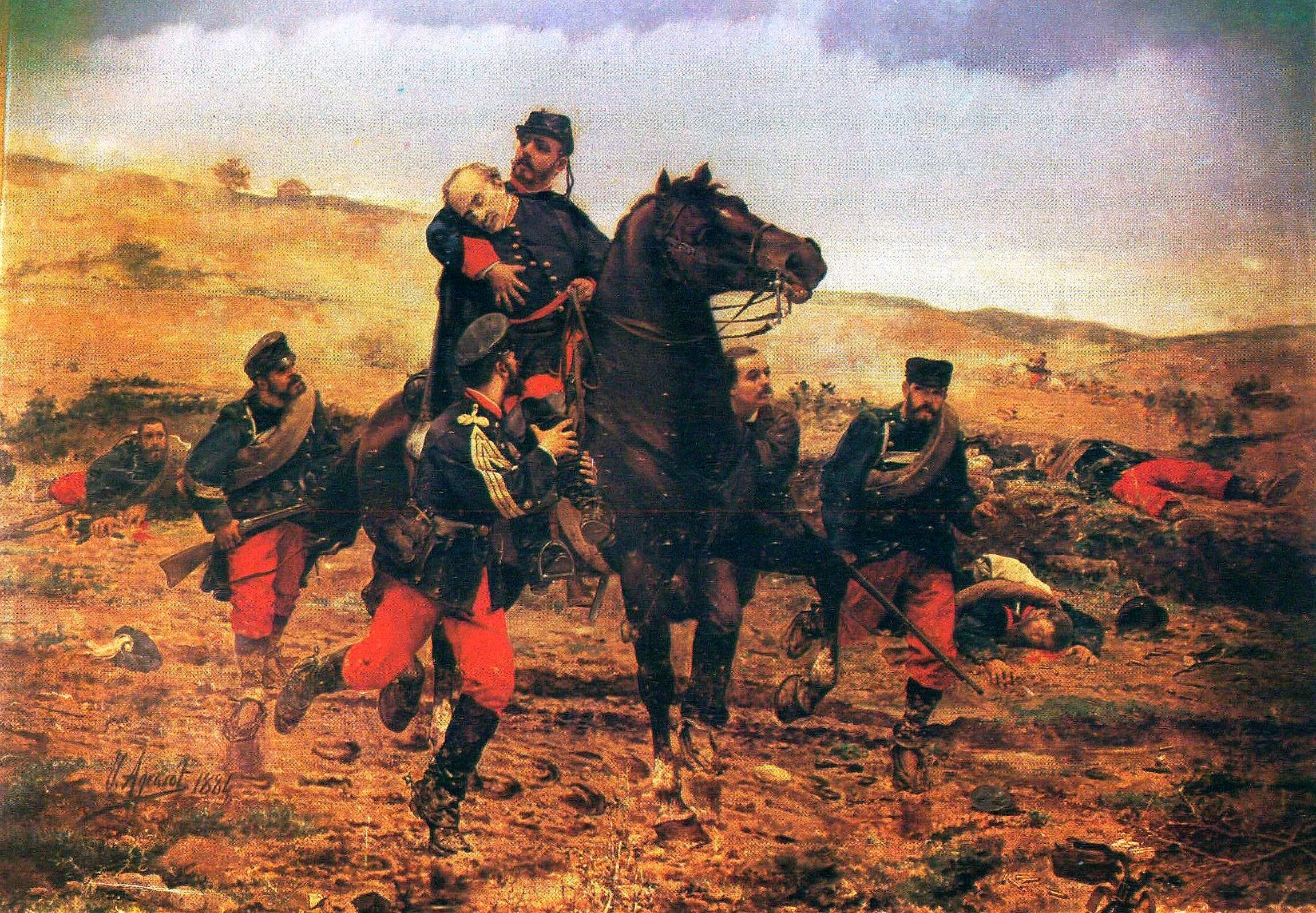
Death of the Marquis of Duero (1884) by the painter Joaquín Agrassot. The death of General De la Concha, Marquis of Duero, in the siege of Estella in June 1874 thwarted Cánovas' plans to proclaim Prince Alfonso as King of Spain after the victory over the Carlists (which would not take place until February 1876).

After the establishment of the unitary Republic under General Serrano, following the Pavía coup in January 1874, conspiratorial activity in favor of the Bourbon restoration intensified. As historian Feliciano Montero notes, Cánovas's challenge was not to prevent military intervention, but to control and subordinate it to his broader, conciliatory, and non-revanchist vision. He relied particularly on General Manuel Gutiérrez de la Concha, a respected officer not affiliated with the Moderate Party, who commanded the Army of the North in the Carlist strongholds of the Basque Country and Navarre. Their plan was to declare Alfonso king after capturing Estella, the Carlist capital, following the successful capture of Bilbao in May 1874. However, the plan failed when General Concha was killed during the siege of Estella, which ultimately did not fall. Cánovas distrusted General Martínez Campos, who would eventually carry out the pronunciamiento of Sagunto, because of his ties to the Moderate Party and its differing vision for the monarchy. Nevertheless, the military action proceeded. When Cánovas met with Isabella II in Paris on August 8 and 14, he reaffirmed that Alfonso’s restoration should arise from a broad-based movement of public opinion, not from a military coup.

==== Manifesto of Sandhurst ====
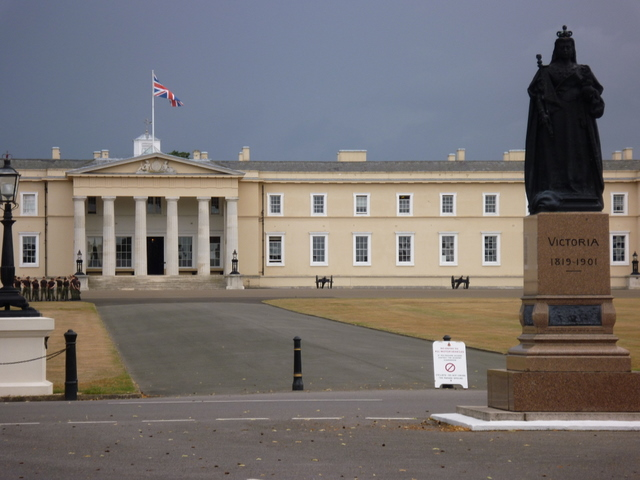
View of the Royal Military Academy at Sandhurst with the statue of Queen Victoria in the foreground. Prince Alfonso had been attending military studies there since October 1874.

On December 1, 1874, three days after Prince Alfonso’s seventeenth birthday, Antonio Cánovas del Castillo launched a decisive step toward the Bourbon restoration with the publication of the Sandhurst Manifesto. Carefully drafted by Cánovas and signed by the prince, the document took the form of a letter written from the British Royal Military Academy at Sandhurst, where Alfonso had enrolled in October at Cánovas’s initiative to strengthen his constitutional image. The letter was framed as a response to the many birthday greetings the prince had received from Spain.

Although written by Cánovas, the manifesto was reviewed by several individuals, including former Queen Isabella II, who discussed it extensively, according to Cánovas. The text was circulated in various European newspapers, but deliberately not sent to any reigning monarchs. Cánovas's aim, as he explained to Isabella, was to convey that Spain already had a king "capable of wielding power as soon as he is called".

In the manifesto, Prince Alfonso offered the restoration of a "hereditary and representative monarchy" in his person, presenting himself as "the only representative of the monarchical right in Spain." He argued that the monarchy was the only remaining institution capable of restoring confidence in a nation that was, in his words, "orphaned of all public right and indefinitely deprived of its liberties". The letter concluded with a personal pledge: "Whatever my own fate may be, I will not cease to be a good Spaniard, nor, like all my ancestors, a good Catholic, nor, as a man of the century, truly liberal".

Historians broadly agree that the Sandhurst Manifesto encapsulated the core principles of the Restoration regime. According to Ramón Villares, the document represented the political pact among the various Alfonsist factions by the end of 1874. It served both to legitimize the Bourbon alternative and to outline the political project behind Prince Alfonso’s candidacy, presenting its framework to both Spanish society and the international community.

== Fall of the Republic and proclamation of Prince Alfonso as king ==
=== Pronunciamiento of Sagunto ===
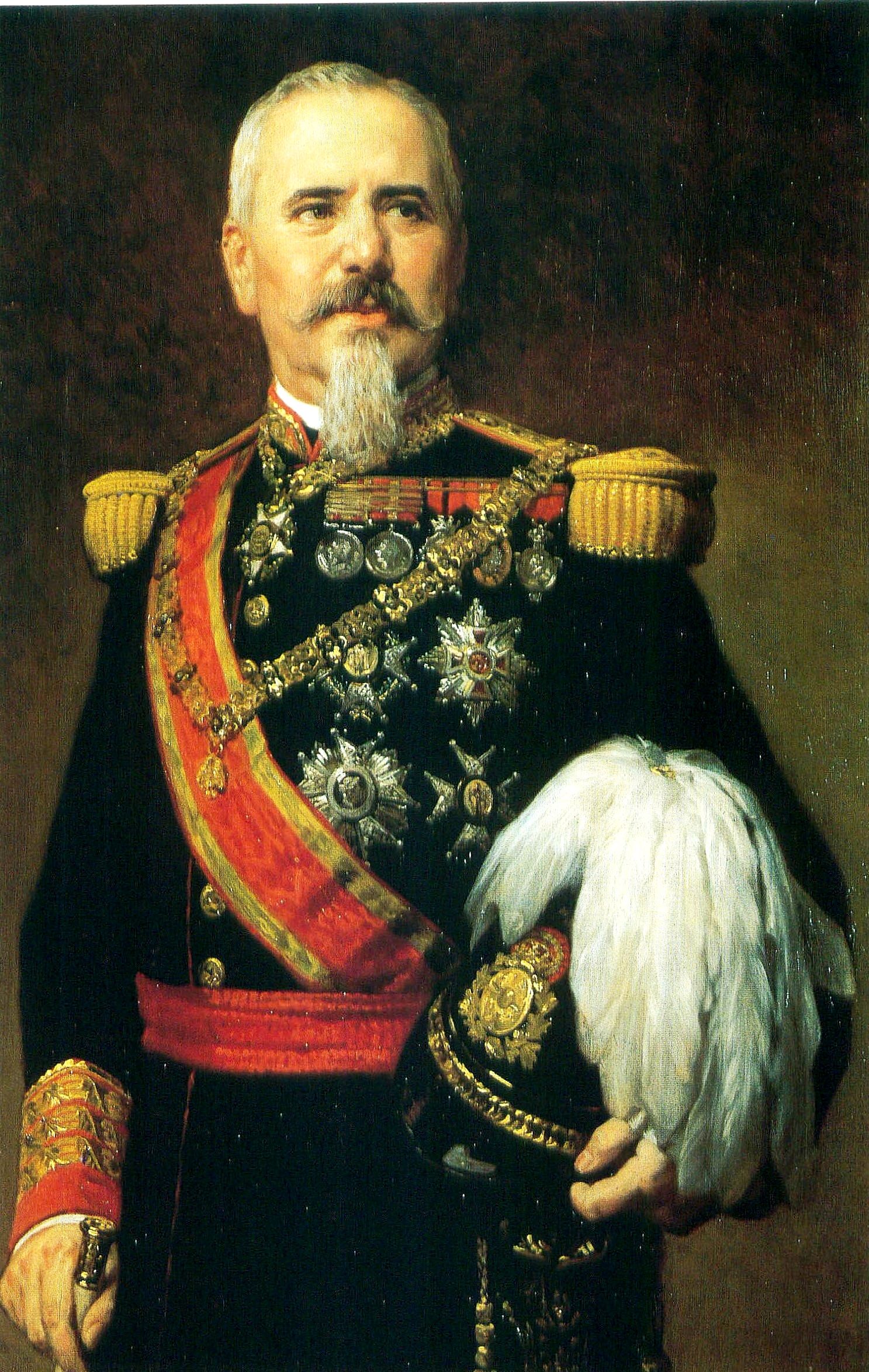
General Arsenio Martínez Campos.

Although Antonio Cánovas del Castillo had hoped to restore the monarchy through broad public consensus rather than a military coup, events unfolded differently. In the early hours of December 29, 1874, General Arsenio Martínez Campos declared in Sagunto in favor of restoring the Bourbon monarchy under Prince Alfonso de Borbón, effectively proclaiming him King of Spain. As Ramón Villares noted, this was "the event that was expected in the flag rooms and aristocratic salons adorned with the fleur-de-lis.

The pronunciamiento was driven by generals associated with the Moderate Party, led by the Count of Valmaseda. These figures had opposed the Sandhurst Manifesto, viewing it as overly shaped by Cánovas’s personal ideas rather than those of the prince. The manifesto's publication hastened their plans. Valmaseda, a former Captain General of Cuba, had close ties to Martínez Campos and the powerful Spanish-Cuban lobby. This group, deeply invested in preserving the colonial order and slavery in Cuba, feared that the war on the island could lead to a revolution similar to Haiti’s—something they warned against in a manifesto from the Spanish nobility.

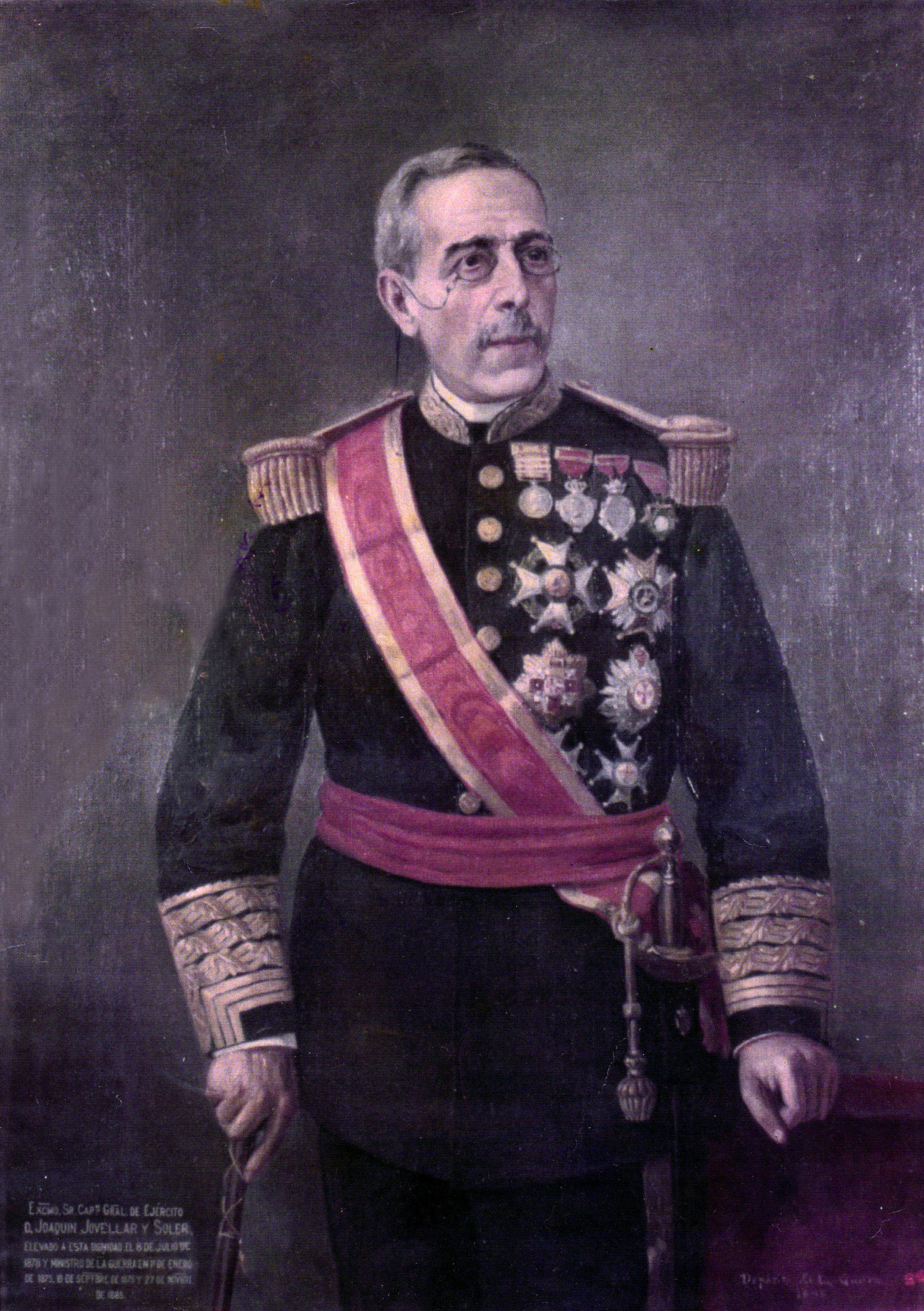
Portrait of General Joaquín Jovellar, whose support for Martínez Campos's pronunciamiento in Sagunto was decisive for its triumph.

Martínez Campos had only around 1,800 troops, and no major force had formally committed to his cause. The success of the pronunciamiento was largely due to the support of General Joaquín Jovellar, commander of the Army of the Center, who chose to back the movement. Jovellar justified his decision in a telegram to the Minister of War, stating that "a sentiment of elevated patriotism [...] and the need to keep the Army united" had compelled him to lead the effort to avoid further anarchy. Martínez Campos sent similar telegrams urging acceptance of the new situation to end civil unrest and restore stability.

The government of Práxedes Mateo Sagasta initially prepared to resist the uprising. On the night of December 30, Sagasta communicated via telegraph with General Serrano, President of the Executive Power of the Republic, who was in northern Spain preparing an offensive against the Carlists. However, Serrano admitted he lacked the loyal forces needed to defend the capital once Jovellar’s defection became known. In a final message, he stated: "Patriotism forbids me to have three governments in Spain [his own, the Alfonsist, and the Carlist]," and soon after crossed into France.

Almost simultaneously, General Fernando Primo de Rivera, Captain General of Madrid and initially loyal to the Republic, informed Sagasta that the Madrid garrison had joined the movement. He added that a new government would be formed, while Alfonsist troops had already secured key positions in the capital and surrounded the Ministry of War, where the cabinet was in session. At 11 p.m. on December 30, 1874, Sagasta handed over power. The pronunciamiento that began in Sagunto had succeeded, marking the end of the First Republic and the beginning of the Bourbon Restoration under Alfonso XII.

=== Formation of the Ministry-Regency and arrival of Alfonso XII in Spain ===
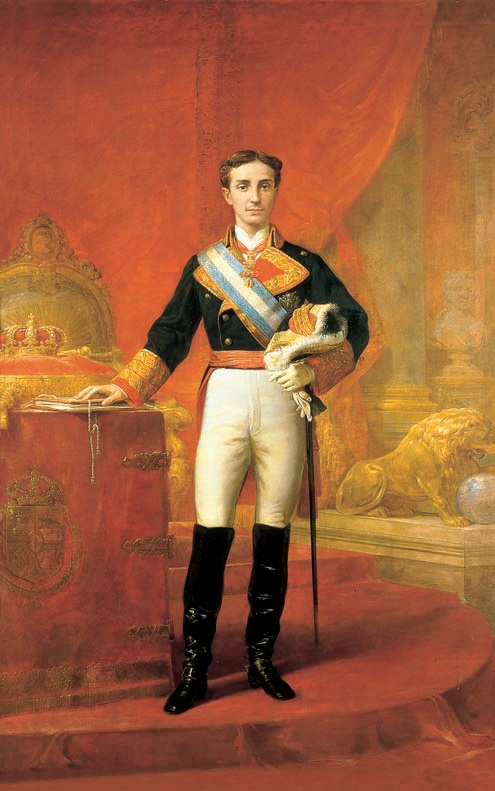
Portrait of Alfonso XII made by Carlos Luis de Ribera y Fieve, as soon as he was proclaimed king of Spain.

On December 31, 1874, a Ministry-Regency was formed under the leadership of Antonio Cánovas del Castillo, who had remained under nominal "detention" in the civil government building of Madrid during the pronunciamiento, along with other prominent Alfonsists. There, General Primo de Rivera visited him and pledged full support. Cánovas, though initially reluctant, declared: "I have wished the Restoration in another way, but in view of the attitude of the Army and the unanimous opinion of the country, I accept and assume the procedure; I cannot oppose it; it is my duty; the Restoration is a fact". A telegram was sent to Queen Isabella II informing her that her son had been proclaimed King of Spain "without struggle or bloodshed" by the Army of the Center, the Army of the North, the Madrid garrison, and provincial forces. At the time, Prince Alfonso was in Paris with his mother and sisters, having arrived from London the previous day, unaware of the developments. In a letter to his mother, he had stated his intention to return to Sandhurst after the Epiphany.

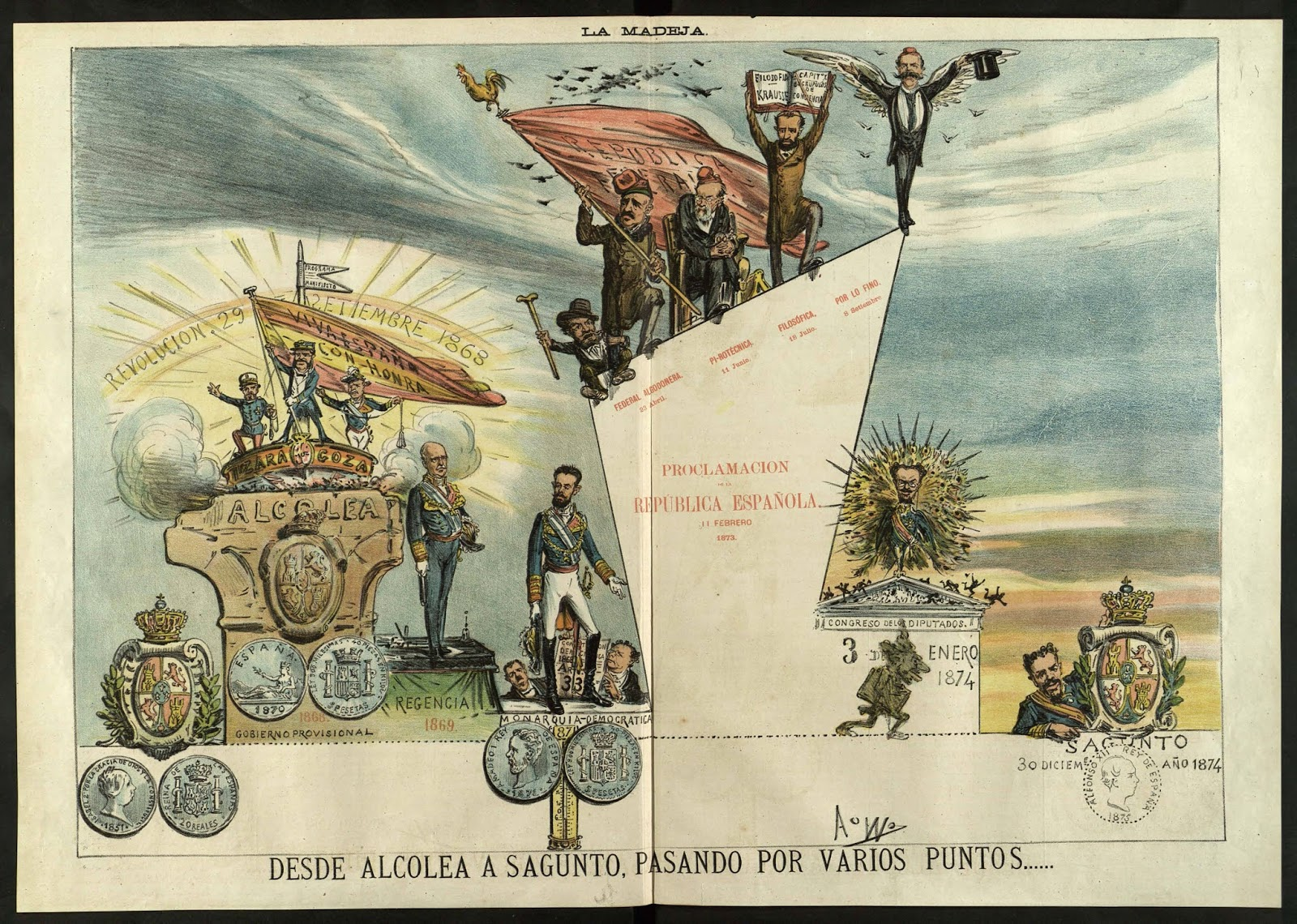
Caricature by Tomás Padró published in La Flaca in 1874 entitled "From Alcolea to Sagunto. Passing through different points...". It shows the different stages that took place in Spain from the Revolution of 1868 ("Alcolea") to the pronunciamiento of Martínez Campos ("Sagunto"), to finally return to the beginning: the restoration in December 1874 of the Bourbon monarchy dethroned in September 1868. Appearing from left to right: the three military men who led the "Glorious Revolution" (Generals Prim and Serrano and Admiral Topete, the latter waving the Spanish flag with the motto " Long live Spain with honor"); the regent Serrano; King Amadeo I (at his feet Manuel Ruiz Zorrilla and Cristino Martos); the four presidents of the Executive Power of the First Spanish Republic (Estanislao Figueras, Francisco Pi y Margall, Nicolás Salmerón and Emilio Castelar); General Manuel Pavía whose coup d'état led to the unitary Republic of 1874 (the silhouette of Sagasta appears); and finally, showing his head behind the monarchic coat of arms, General Martínez Campos.

Isabella II received the telegram early on December 31 and showed it to her son, who had already heard rumors of the pronunciamiento the night before via an anonymous note while attending a theatre performance. Nevertheless, Alfonso delayed his response for five days—according to historian Carlos Seco Serrano, likely to confirm the stability of the new situation. His official reply, published in the Gaceta de Madrid on January 6, 1875, confirmed his acceptance and authority. He reaffirmed the principles of the Sandhurst Manifesto and called for national reconciliation, true liberty, and the start of a new era of peace and prosperity. The reference to "true freedom" displeased some elements of the Moderate Party.

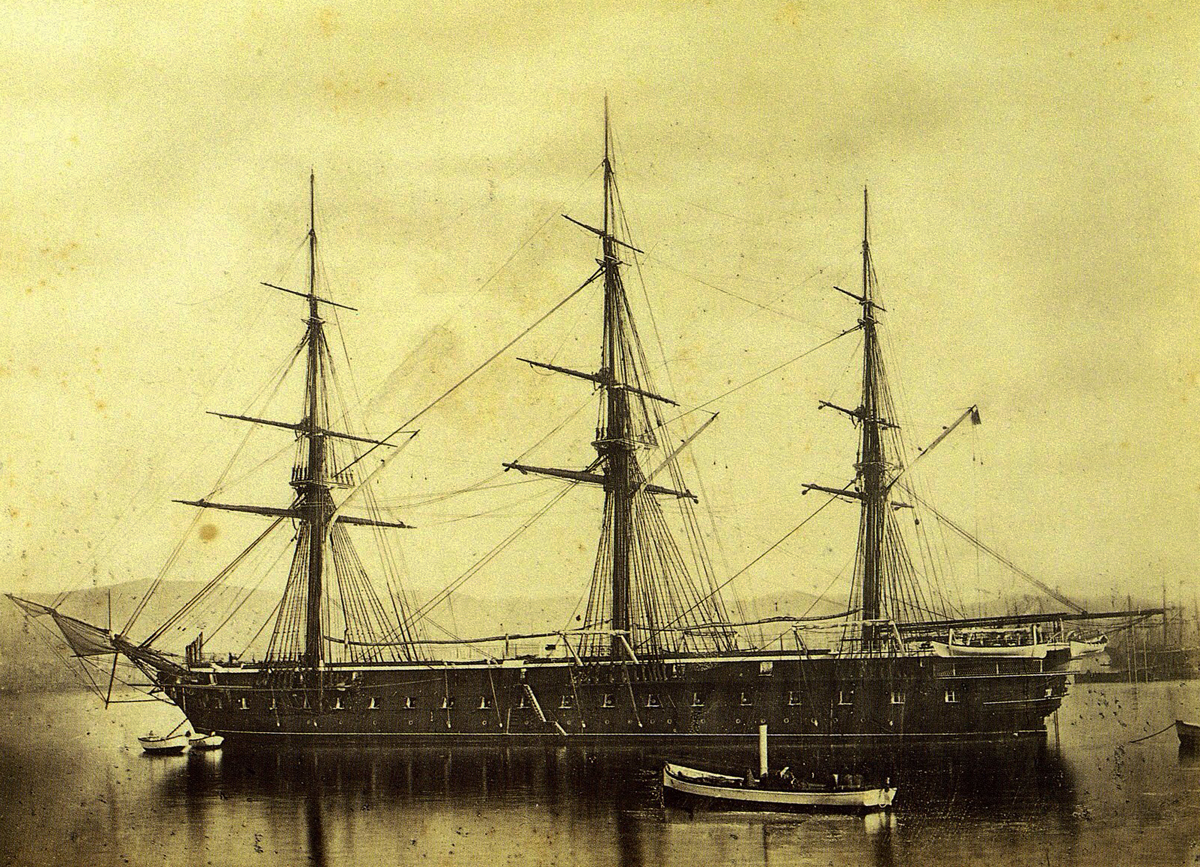
The screw frigate Navas de Tolosa, which was the Spanish Navy ship that carried Prince-king Alfonso from Marseilles to Barcelona.

Cánovas advised that Alfonso should return to Spain alone, without his mother or the Duke of Montpensier. In a later letter, he bluntly explained to Isabella II that her presence would symbolize the past: "Your Majesty is not a person, you are a reign, a historical epoch, and what the country needs is another reign and another epoch different from the previous ones". Alfonso XII arrived in Barcelona on January 9, 1875, from Marseilles aboard the Navas de Tolosa, welcomed by General Martínez Campos and large crowds. In a public address, Alfonso expressed pride in the title Count of Barcelona and affection for Catalonia. His arrival was marked by a Te Deum in the cathedral and a gala at the Gran Teatro del Liceo. He telegraphed his mother: "The reception that Barcelona has given me exceeds my hopes, would exceed your wishes [...]". He departed for Valencia the next day and then traveled by train to Madrid, arriving on January 14. His entrance into the capital was widely described as “apotheosic” in the press. However, historian Carlos Dardé has noted that the Restoration did not generate widespread enthusiasm. Contemporary observers often remarked not on popular excitement, but rather on the general indifference with which most Spaniards greeted both the fall of the Republic and the return of the monarchy.

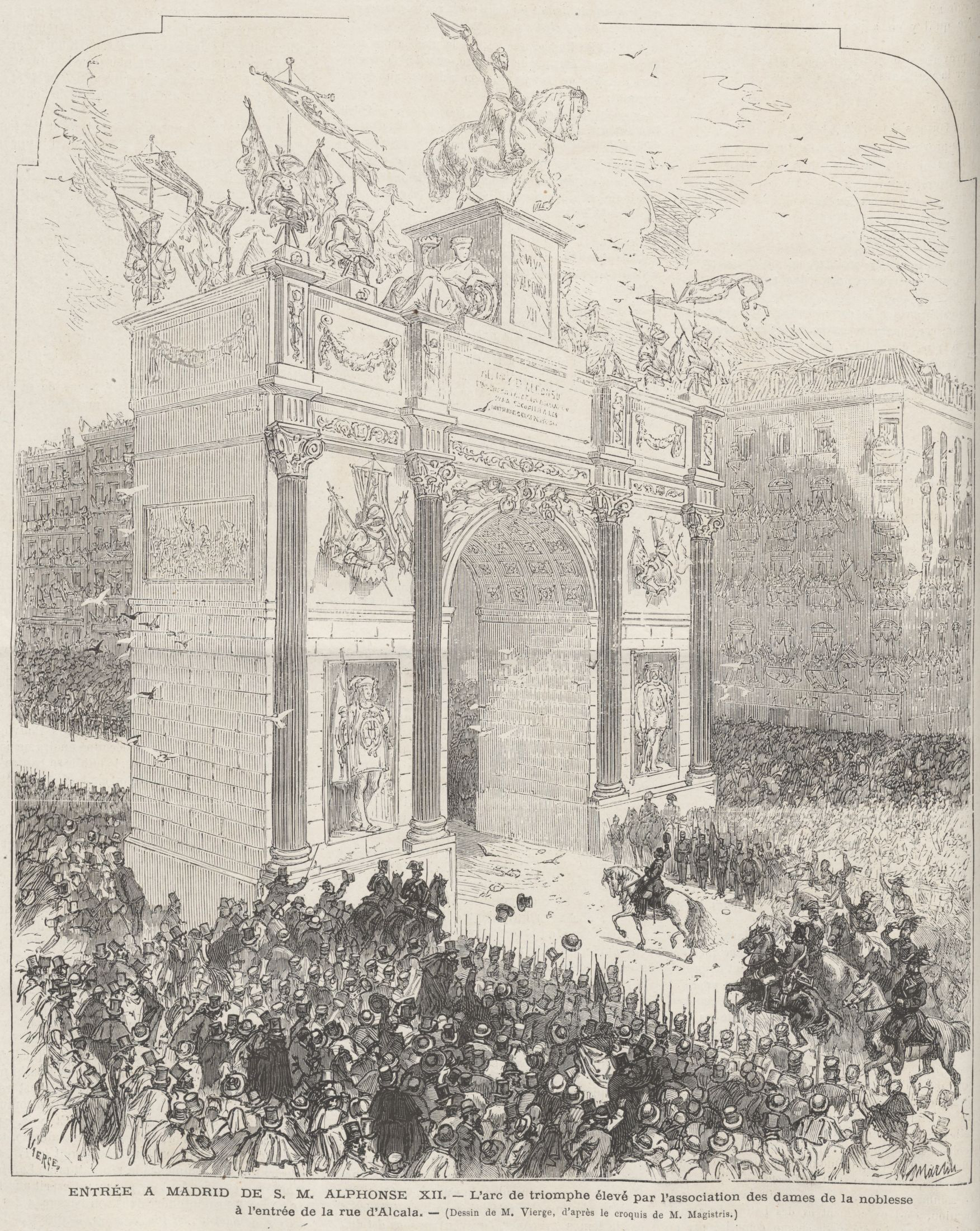
Engraving showing the entrance of King Alfonso XII in Madrid as he passes under a triumphal arch erected in Alcalá Street by the association of ladies of the nobility.

Upon arriving in Madrid, Alfonso XII confirmed the government formed in his name by Cánovas del Castillo on December 31. The cabinet included both loyal supporters—such as Pedro Salaverría (Treasury) and the Marquis of Molins (Navy)—and notable figures from the Sexenio Democrático, including Francisco Romero Robledo (Interior), Adelardo López de Ayala (Overseas Territories), and General Jovellar (War), representing the military. Cánovas aimed to pursue a "liberal but conservative" policy, avoiding both democratic radicalism and reactionary Carlist influence. The cabinet also included a representative of the Moderate Party, the Marquis of Orovio (Development). Cánovas excluded prominent Moderates such as General Martínez Campos and Count of Valmaseda from ministerial posts, instead appointing them to military commands in Catalonia and Cuba, distancing them from Madrid. Many moderates declined to join the government upon learning they would be grouped with "septembrinos" and that the Constitution of 1845 would not be restored. Claudio Moyano, a leading moderate, rejected collaboration on these grounds.

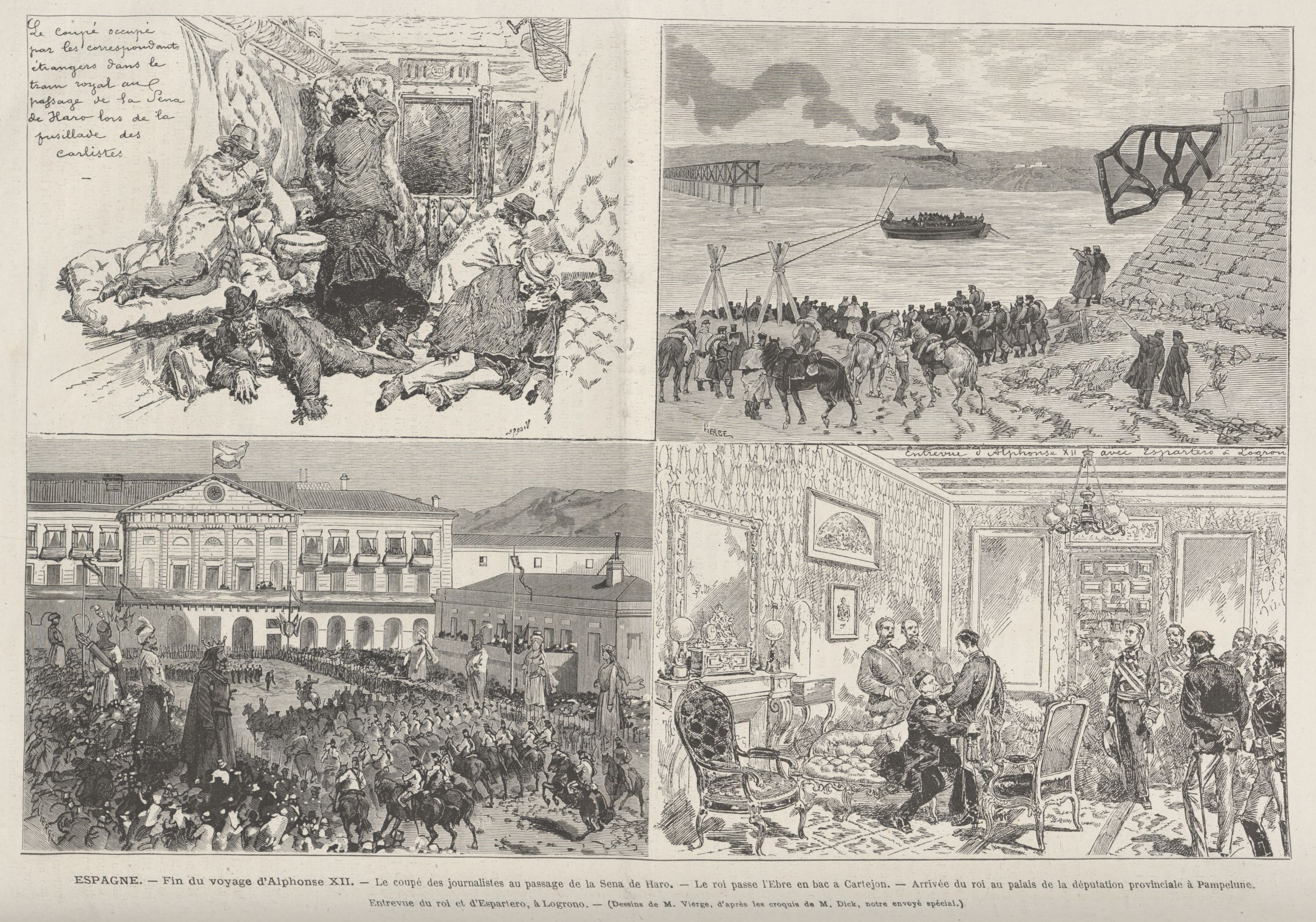
Four images of the trip that Alfonso XII made to the north front. In the one at the bottom right: the visit he paid to General Baldomero Espartero on his return.

Shortly after his arrival in Madrid, Alfonso XII traveled to the northern front, assuming the symbolic role of "soldier-king." In Peralta (Navarre), he appealed to Carlists for peace, offering reconciliation while warning that the war they waged was unjustified. His "Proclamation of Peralta" had little effect, and the conflict continued for another year. On his return, he visited Logroño and greeted General Baldomero Espartero, a gesture signaling openness to all liberal factions. Alfonso had already made clear his intent to rule as a monarch for all Spaniards. In response to a speech by the Archbishop of Valencia evoking Visigothic and Habsburg heritage, he asserted his goal to bring peace, justice, and freedom to all Spaniards, not to rule as a partisan king. Cánovas later expressed admiration for the young monarch, praising his sincerity and sense of duty, and predicted a reign free from favoritism.

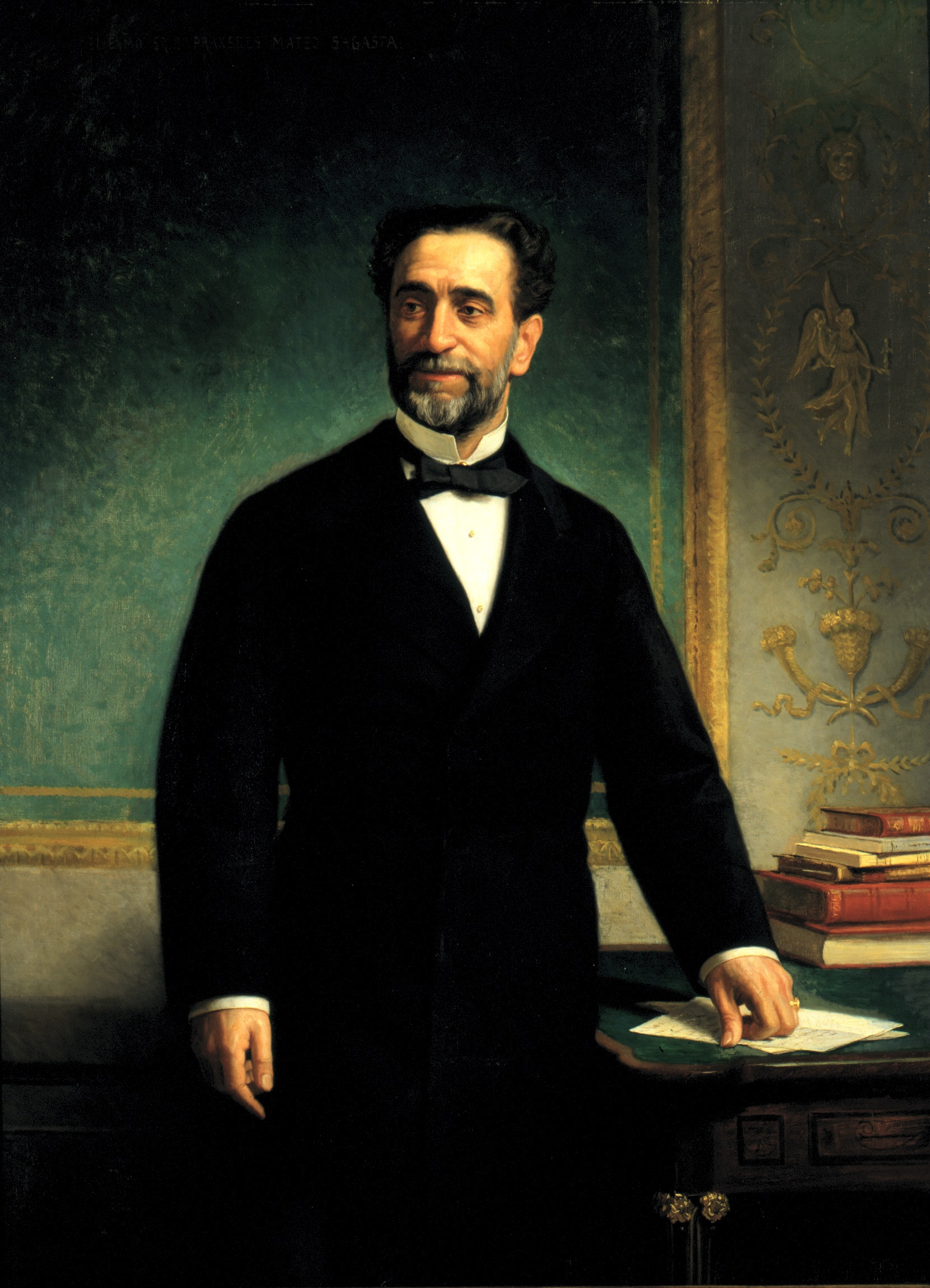
Portrait of the Constitutional Party leader Práxedes Mateo Sagasta by Ignacio Suárez Llanos (1877). Although he was the last president of the Government of the Republic, he was willing to collaborate with the new monarchy, especially to defeat Carlism and put an end to the Cuban insurrection. He was invited to the Palace by Alfonso XII.

During his two-week stay at the front, Alfonso faced danger on at least one occasion. Upon returning to Madrid on February 13, he made overtures to former September revolutionaries. He decorated Dr. Pedro González de Velasco, a known leftist, met with General Serrano, the last head of the Republic, and hosted a banquet attended by Constitutional Party leaders, including Práxedes Mateo Sagasta, the last republican prime minister. Both Serrano and Sagasta expressed willingness to cooperate in order to defeat Carlism. On January 5, shortly after Martínez Campos's pronunciamiento, La Iberia, the Constitutional Party's newspaper, had expressed willingness to support the new monarchy in exchange for action against Carlism and the Cuban insurrection. A year later, in a speech before the Cortes, Alfonso XII acknowledged the role of constitutionalists in stabilizing the country before his accession.

However, Radical Republican leader Manuel Ruiz Zorrilla remained opposed to the regime and was expelled from Spain in February for alleged conspiratorial activity. Journalist Ángel Fernández de los Ríos, despite his past friendship with Cánovas, was also banished.

== First government of Cánovas del Castillo (1875-1881): creation of the political regime of the Restoration ==
The Liberal-Conservative Party governed from 1875 to 1881, with Antonio Cánovas del Castillo serving as head of government for most of the period, except during two brief intervals when he resigned for strategic reasons. The first occurred between September and December 1875, when he temporarily ceded the presidency to General Jovellar to distance himself from the responsibility of calling general elections by universal suffrage, which he opposed. The second was from March to December 1879, when General Martínez Campos assumed leadership to avoid Cánovas overseeing two consecutive electoral processes and to implement the Peace of Zanjón, which Cánovas preferred not to manage. Cánovas returned to power after Martínez Campos resigned due to parliamentary resistance to his proposed colonial and military reforms following the 1879 elections.

The liberal opposition, led by Práxedes Mateo Sagasta, criticized the prolonged conservative rule, describing it as "an authoritarianism bordering on dictatorship". From January 1875 to January 1877, Cánovas governed under a regime of exception with restricted civil liberties, a period often referred to as the "dictatorship of Cánovas." This regime persisted beyond the enactment of the 1876 Constitution and only ended with the passage of the Law of January 1877, which imposed limited regulation of freedoms and retroactively justified the state of exception.

=== The political project of Cánovas and the struggle with the Moderate Party ===
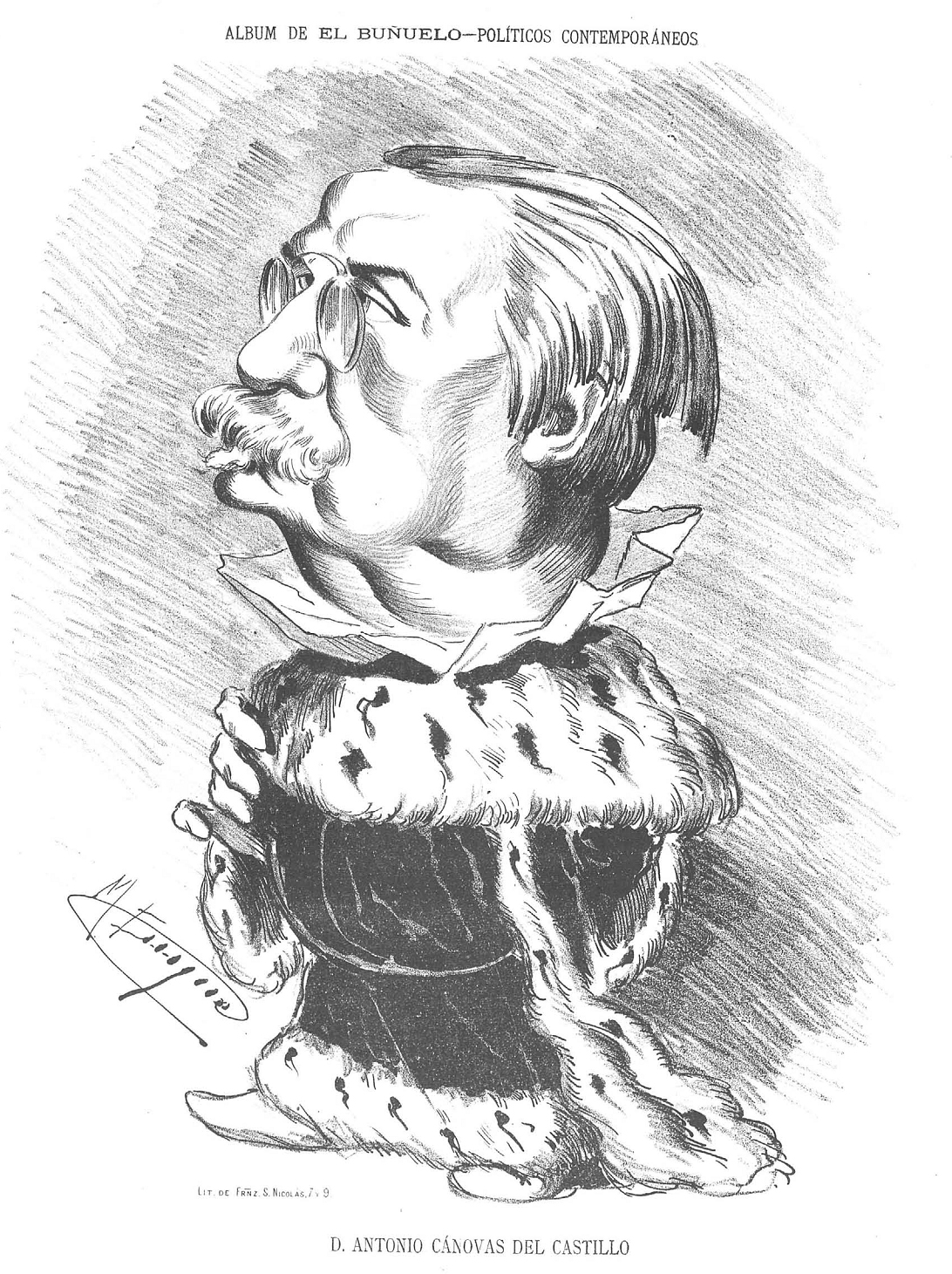
Caricature of the president of the Government and leader of the Conservative Party, Antonio Cánovas del Castillo, dressed in the royal ermine, a frequent accusation among his detractors: "Mr. Cánovas reigns and governs at the same time, although he shows more fondness for the former than the latter", stated a prominent liberal leader. Satirical magazine El Buñuelo, February 10, 1881.

Antonio Cánovas del Castillo's ―primary objective was to consolidate and stabilize the liberal State through a constitutional monarchy, as outlined in the Sandhurst Manifesto. Emphasizing pragmatism and compromise, he sought to avoid the errors of the reign of Isabella II, particularly the exclusive alignment of the Crown with one liberal faction (the Moderates), which had led others (Progressives) to resort to military uprisings to gain power. Cánovas aimed to allow peaceful alternation between liberal factions, thereby removing the military from political life and restoring civilian leadership. Cánovas had the full support of King Alfonso XII, who expressed to the British ambassador his desire to introduce a constitutional system similar to that of Britain. Cánovas, in turn, valued the monarch’s commitment and character.

The main challenge to Cánovas’ project came not from the left, but from the Moderate Party, described by the British ambassador as "the reactionary section of the Alfonsino party". Although his ultimate goal was to divide and integrate them into his system, Cánovas initially made concessions. The early actions of his government involved revising legislation from the Sexenio Democrático and fostering a negative perception of that period, particularly the First Republic.

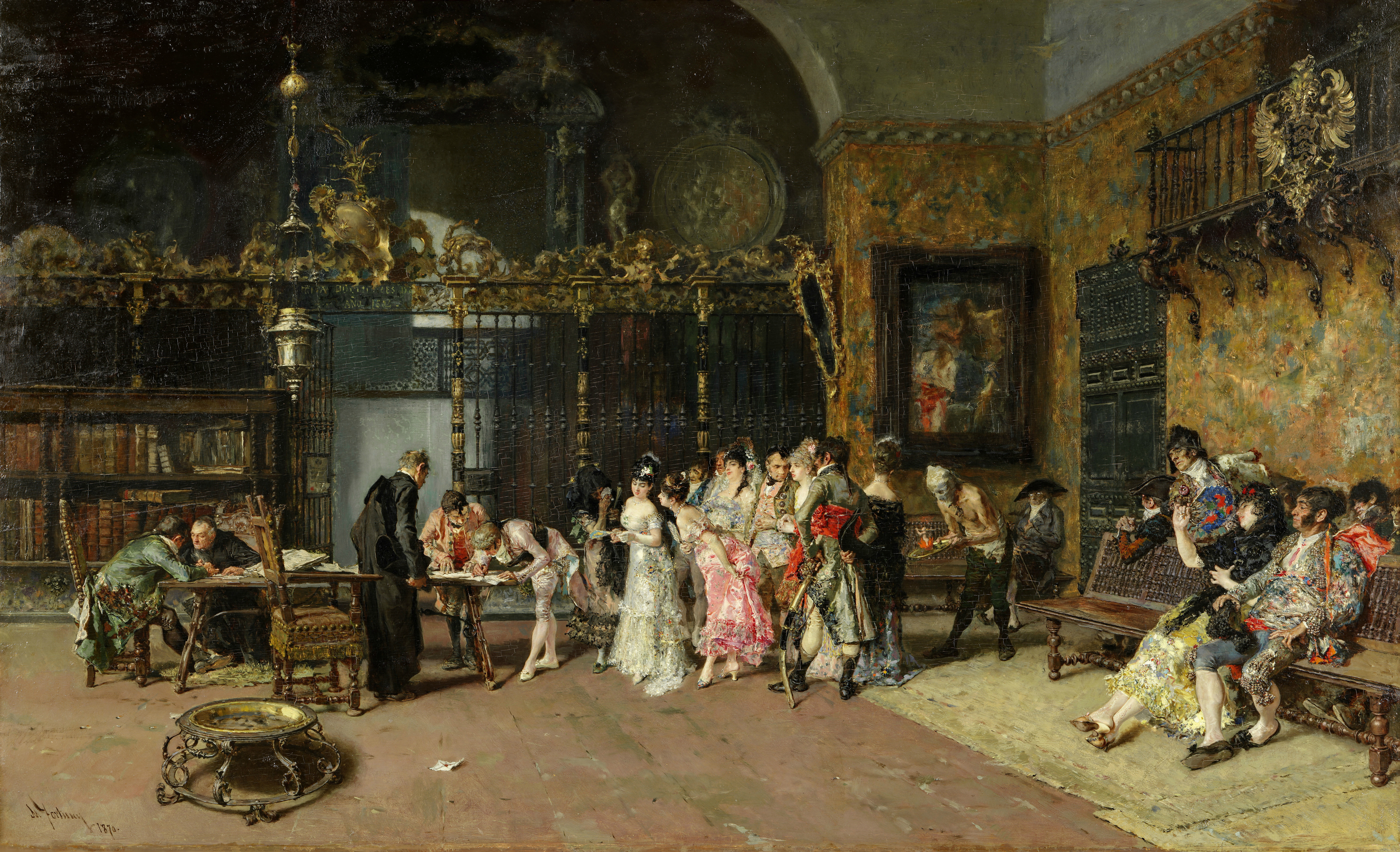
The Vicarage of Mariano Fortuny (1870). The government of Cánovas repealed the Provisional Civil Marriage Law of 1870 and reestablished the obligatory nature of canonical marriage.

His alignment with the Moderates was most evident in three areas: Church relations, fundamental rights, and academic freedom. The Concordat of 1851 was restored, re-establishing state funding for the Church and repealing laws from the Sexenio, including the legalization of civil marriage—replacing it with obligatory canonical marriage. Some Protestant temples, newspapers, and schools were closed, and anti-non-Catholic rhetoric was tolerated. Efforts were also made to restore relations with the Holy See and return Church property.

Civil liberties were significantly restricted during Cánovas' first years, a period often referred to as the "dictatorship of Cánovas." Freedom of expression, assembly, and association were curtailed, and opposition newspapers—especially republican ones—were closed or subjected to prior censorship. A 1875 decree limited press freedom by banning attacks, even indirect or symbolic, on the monarchy. The jury system was suspended. In 1879, a restrictive press law criminalized questioning the legitimacy of elections or promoting anti-monarchical views. A 1880 law on assembly further limited political freedoms, distinguishing between legal and illegal political groups. Additionally, the 1876 law centralized local government by placing mayoral appointments in large cities under the authority of the king and requiring provincial governors' approval for municipal budgets.

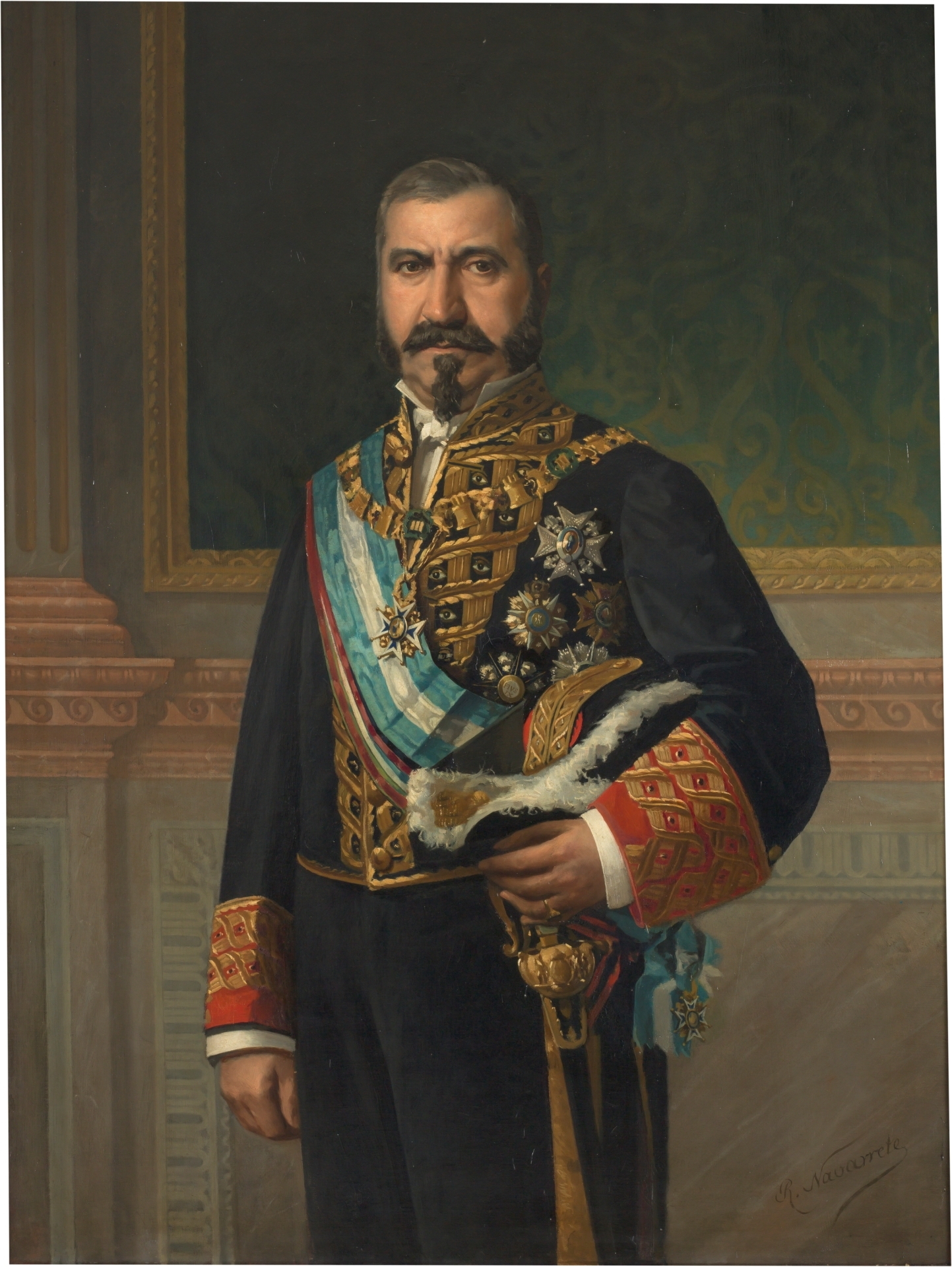
Manuel Orovio Echagüe, Marquis of Orovio, Minister of Public Works, author of the decree bearing his name that limited academic freedom.

In the field of academic freedom, the Orovio Decree—issued in February 1875 by Minister of Public Works Manuel Orovio Echagüe—prohibited university professors from teaching doctrines contrary to Catholic orthodoxy and the constitutional monarchy, triggering the "second university question". In a circular to university rectors, Orovio urged them to prevent the teaching of ideas opposing Catholic dogma and warned that professors who rejected the established regime would face sanctions. The first conflict arose at the University of Santiago de Compostela, where professors Laureano Calderón and Augusto González de Linares were dismissed and imprisoned for presenting Darwinist ideas. This prompted a wave of solidarity among academics, including Francisco Giner de los Ríos, Gumersindo de Azcárate, and Nicolás Salmerón. Many resigned or were expelled and later founded the Institución Libre de Enseñanza, in 1876, which would have a lasting influence on Spanish intellectual life.

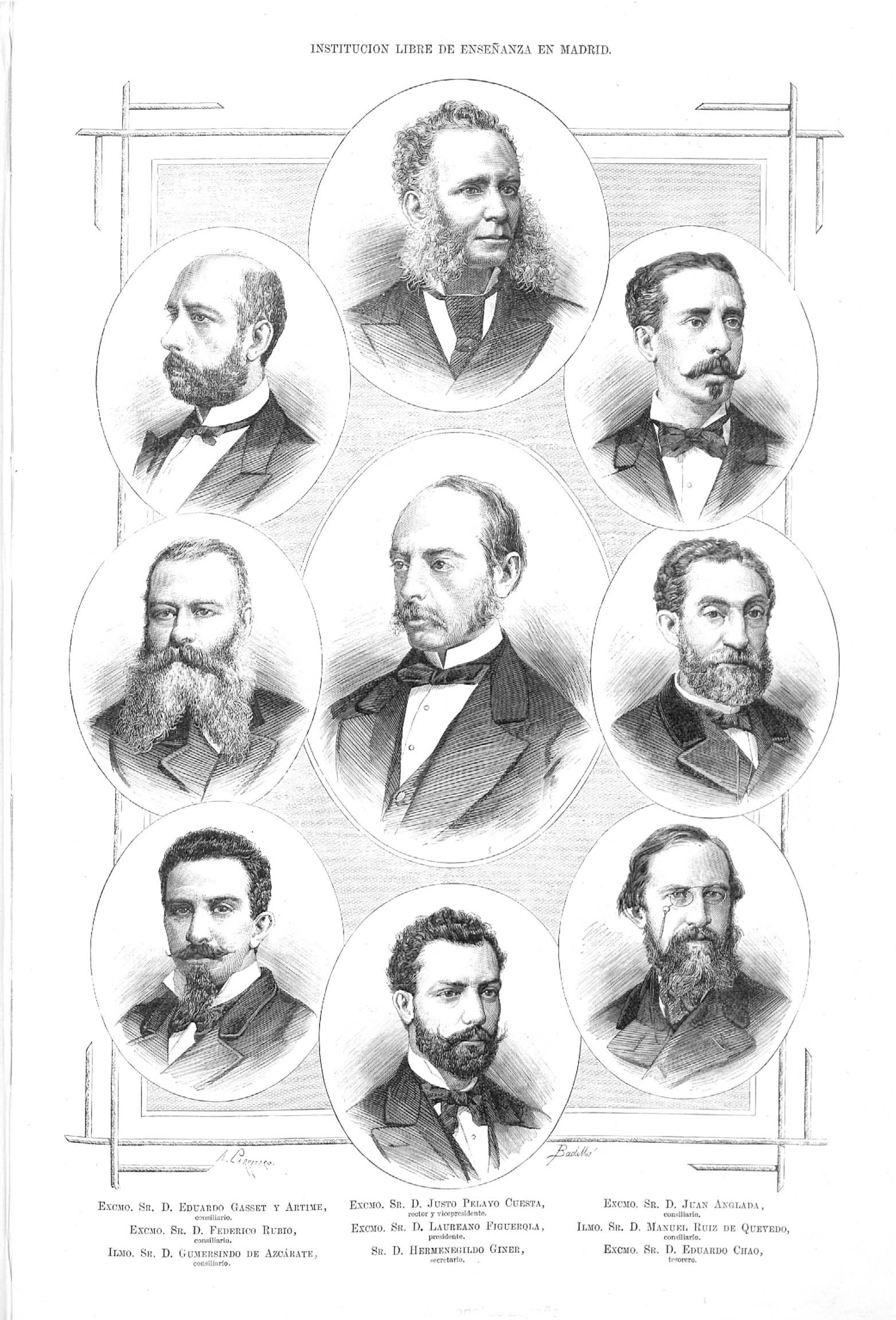
Board of Directors of the Institución Libre de Enseñanza: in the center Laureano Figuerola, president; above Justo Pelayo de la Cuesta Núñez, rector and vice-president; below, Hermenegildo Giner, secretary; in the right column and from top to bottom: Eduardo Gasset y Artime, Federico Rubio and Gumersindo de Azcárate; in the left column and from top to bottom: Juan Anglada, Manuel Ruiz de Quevedo and Eduardo Chao.

Historians such as José Varela Ortega and Feliciano Montero interpret the decree as a manifestation of internal tensions within Canovism, specifically between its Moderate and September-origin factions. The decree, they argue, was a strategy by the Moderates to resist the broader, more inclusive vision of Cánovas. Though Cánovas considered the measure excessive—and so did the king—he initially tolerated it to maintain political cohesion. At the first opportunity, he dismissed Orovio and appointed Cristóbal Martín de Herrera, who reversed the decree. However, the dismissed professors did not regain their positions until the Liberals came to power in 1881. Meanwhile, the Institución Libre de Enseñanza was allowed to operate without interference.

According to Manuel Suárez Cortina, Cánovas allowed the decree as part of a broader effort to integrate the Moderates into the new regime. This included restoring the Concordat of 1851, reinstating state funding for the Church, and reestablishing canonical marriage. Carlos Seco Serrano adds that such gestures aimed to ideologically neutralize the Carlist threat during an ongoing civil conflict. Years later, in Parliament, Cánovas defended his actions as necessary in the context of war, responding to criticism from Nicolás Salmerón by emphasizing the importance of preserving national unity and religious cohesion during the Carlist uprising.

Despite these concessions, Cánovas resisted three core demands of the Moderates—with the full support of Alfonso XII: the reestablishment of the Spanish Constitution of 1845, the restoration of Catholic unity (including the prohibition of non-Catholic worship and the Church’s monopoly over education and civil matters), and the return of Queen Isabella II from exile. While he allowed the return of Princess Isabel (La Chata) and General Serrano, he opposed Isabella II's return. General Martínez Campos even threatened a second pronunciamiento over these issues, and only royal intervention and a posting to Cuba dissuaded him. Nonetheless, other generals, such as the Counts of Cheste and Valmaseda, continued to pressure for Isabella's return.

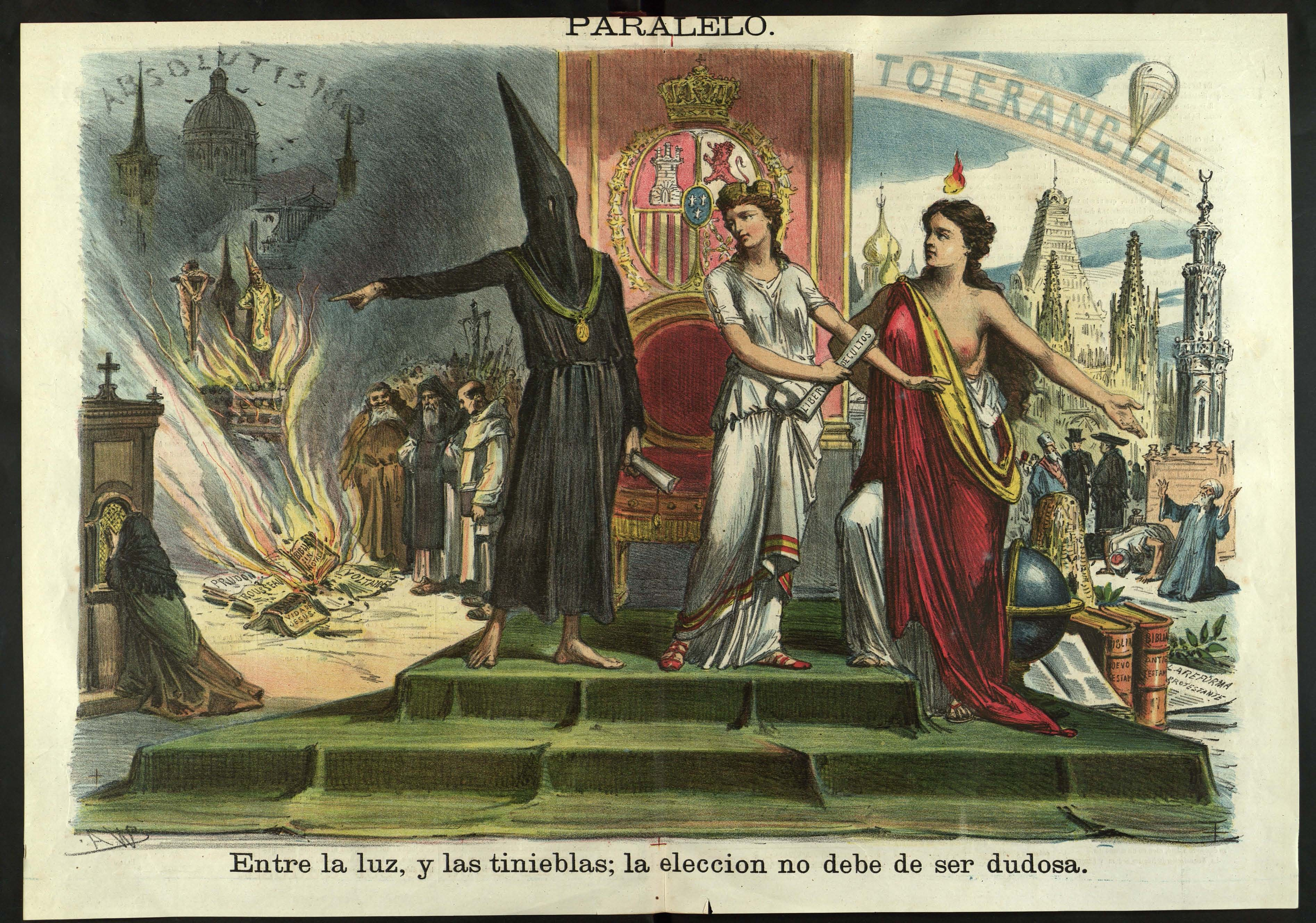
Caricature published in La Madeja in January 1875. The caption reads: "Between light and darkness; the choice should not be doubtful". Spain, represented by a young woman, chooses the light (tolerance and freedom of worship) and rejects the darkness (absolutism and Catholic unity that prohibits any other worship).

The Moderates launched a significant campaign demanding the restoration of Catholic unity, arguing that a Catholic nation should not grant equal rights to non-Catholic religions. Petitions collected in support of this demand were delivered to the government in wagons. The Holy See, supported by Spanish bishops and conservative sectors of society, also pressed for the return to religious exclusivity, threatening to withhold the appointment of a new nuncio. Some figures, including members of Madrid’s elite, even threatened to support the Carlist pretender if Protestant worship were tolerated. Despite this pressure, Cánovas firmly rejected the reestablishment of Catholic unity, considering it incompatible with the long-term viability of the monarchy. He argued that religious tolerance was essential to gain the support of former revolutionaries and to reassure European powers that the Restoration was not a reactionary regime. King Alfonso XII supported this stance, resisting intense lobbying by Moderate politicians, high clergy, nobility, and even his sister, the Princess of Asturias. In response to a bishop, the king stated that although he was a Catholic monarch, he would defend religious freedom in his realm, reflecting Europe’s broader commitment to tolerance.

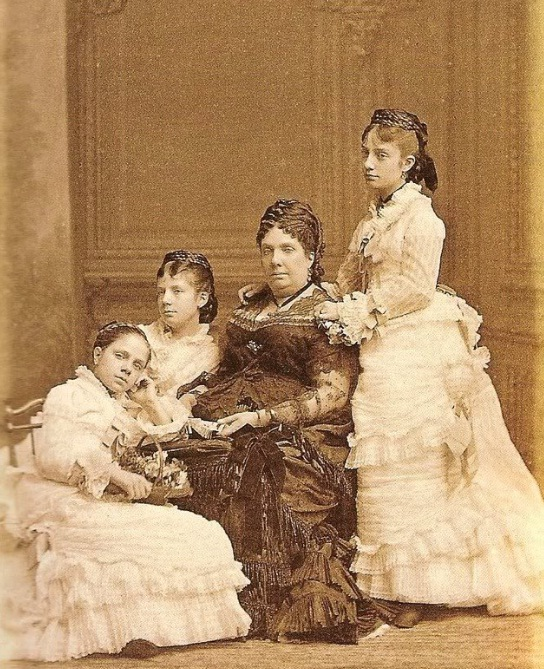
Former Queen Elizabeth II with her three youngest daughters in Paris (1875).

As for ex-Queen Isabella II, Cánovas opposed her return to Spain, fearing it would be seen as a symbol of past regimes and provoke political instability. In an April 1875 letter, he explained that her presence could rekindle old grievances and create division. Even her son advised her against returning, asserting that no one could impose their will on the king.

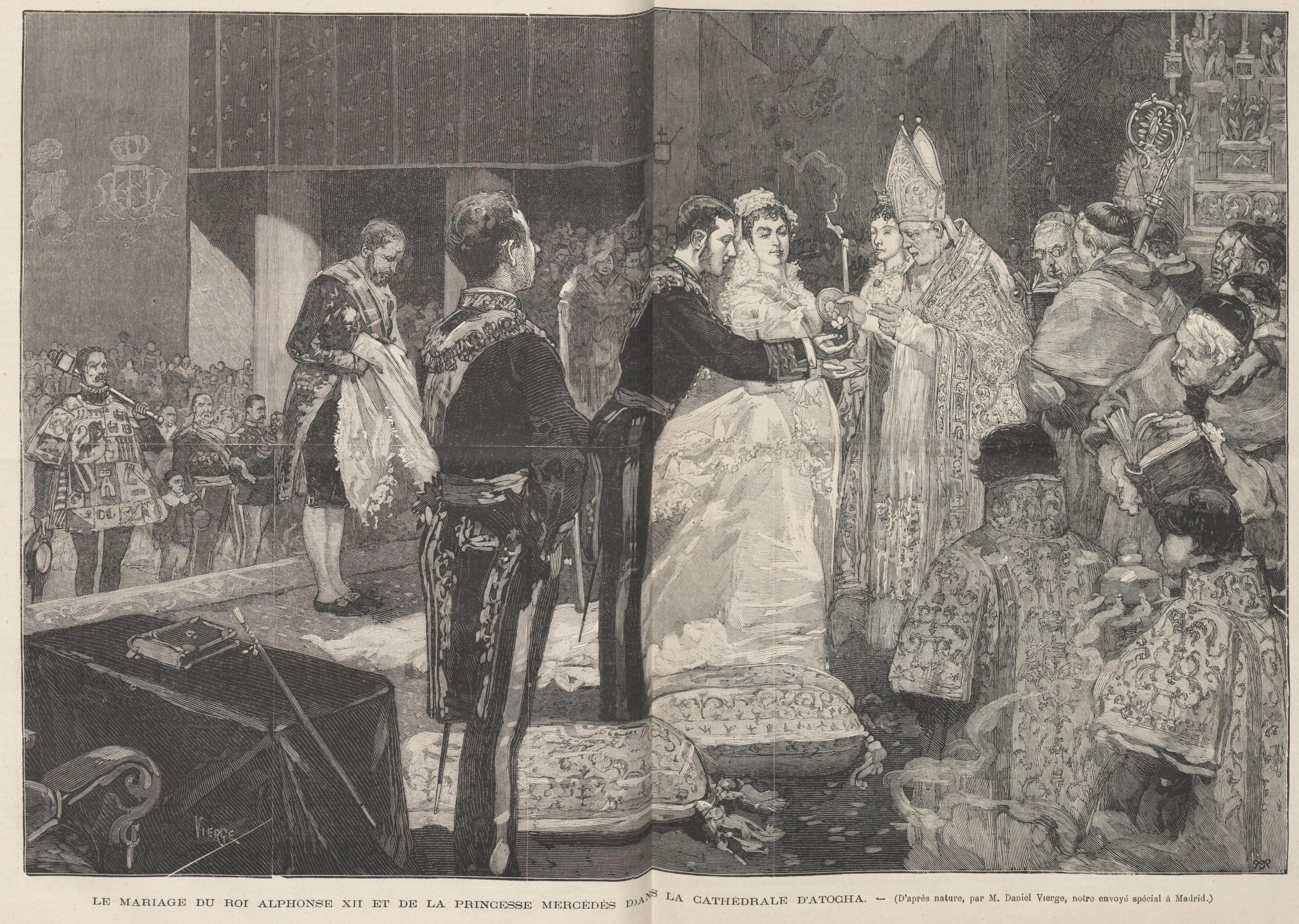
Wedding of Alfonso XII with his cousin María de las Mercedes de Orleans that took place in the basilica of Atocha on January 23, 1878. The former queen Isabella II did not approve of the marriage and did not attend the ceremony.

Isabella was only allowed back after the 1876 Constitution was approved, and even then, her stays were restricted and discreet. She was excluded from state matters, including her son's marriage to her niece, María de las Mercedes de Orleans, a union she opposed but was barred from publicly denouncing. She did not attend the wedding and returned to Paris, where she lived until her death in 1904, with only occasional visits to Spain.

Cánovas' resolve to draft a new Constitution became evident in May 1875, when former parliamentarians of the Elizabethan and Amadeist monarchies were called to form a commission of notables. This move prompted many Moderates to join Canovism and receive government positions, marking the beginning of the Liberal-Conservative Party. The decisive blow to the Moderate Party came during the general elections of January 1876, when Interior Minister Francisco Romero Robledo limited them to just 12 seats, compared to 333 won by Canovists. The Moderate Party was formally dissolved seven years later. According to historians Feliciano Montero and Fidel Gómez Ochoa, Cánovas' refusal to restore Catholic unity was key to the decline of the Moderates and the consolidation of his Liberal-Conservative Party. Gómez Ochoa also notes that the decision to hold the first elections by universal suffrage further alienated the Moderates, some of whom claimed it undermined the king's legitimacy.

=== Constitution of 1876 ===
==== Elaboration and approval of the Constitution ====
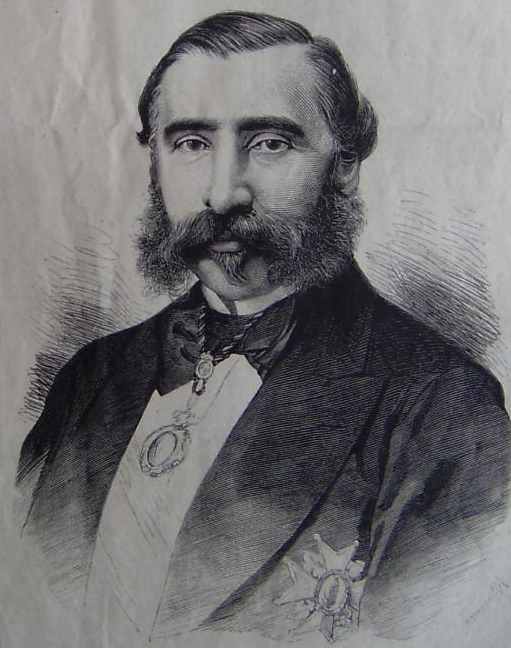
Manuel Alonso Martínez, leader of the sector of the Constitutional Party, who joined Cánovas' project to approve a new Constitution, abandoning the vindication of the Spanish Constitution of 1869. In agreement with Cánovas, he convened the assembly of notables that met in May 1875 and participated in the nine-member commission that drafted the Constitution. His followers were called centralists because of the name of the group they formed: the Parliamentary Center.

In response to the Moderate Party's demand to restore the Constitution of 1845, Antonio Cánovas del Castillo insisted on drafting a new constitution. To this end, he secured the support of the centrist faction of the Constitutional Party, led by Manuel Alonso Martínez, who formed the Parliamentary Center. On May 20, 1875, an Assembly of Notables convened, composed of 341 former deputies and monarchist senators from the Elizabethan era and the Sexenio. Alonso Martínez set the terms: the legitimacy of Alfonso XII’s monarchy could not be questioned, and the goal was to establish constitutional foundations to consolidate the regime.

Although Moderates dominated the Assembly, Cánovas ensured that a 39-member commission—equally composed of Moderates, Canovists, and Centrists—was tasked with drafting the constitutional bases. A nine-member subcommission, including Alonso Martínez, prepared the draft. The main point of contention was the issue of Catholic unity, which was ultimately excluded from Article 11. In response, the Moderates issued a public manifesto on August 3, calling for Catholic protest. Around the Canovist faction, which absorbed many former Moderates, the Liberal-Conservative Party began to take shape, with some historians identifying its formal origin in the Assembly of Notables.

Following this, the government called for elections. A debate arose within the Council of Ministers over whether to retain universal male suffrage, as established by the Electoral Law of 1869. At Cánovas’s proposal, it was decided to hold the elections by universal suffrage “for this one time only,” as a concession to the Constitutionalists. This decision angered the Moderates. To maintain consistency with his personal opposition to universal suffrage, Cánovas resigned, also using the occasion to remove three conservative ministers, including the Marquis of Orovio. General Joaquín Jovellar was appointed head of the government during the electoral preparations, though Cánovas continued to direct policy informally. Cánovas remained opposed to universal suffrage. When it was permanently established in 1890 under Sagasta's Liberal government, he warned that its true implementation would lead to “the triumph of communism and the ruin of the principle of property".

Ahead of the elections, held from January 20 to 24, 1876, the Catholic Church campaigned against candidates supporting religious tolerance, labeling it “freedom of perdition". In contrast, the Commission of Notables issued a manifesto defending the proposed constitutional framework as a means to secure public order, protect monarchy, and uphold the advances of the modern liberal state.

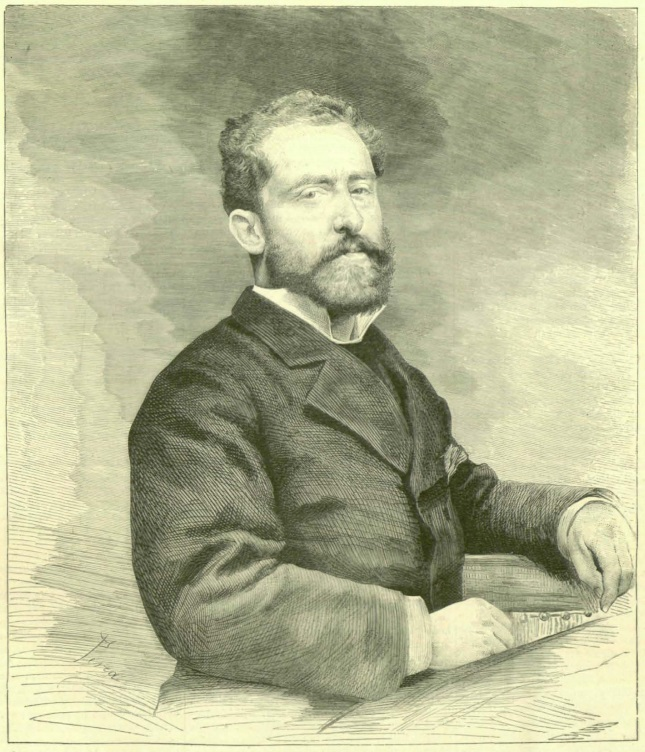
Francisco Romero Robledo, a "repentant" "septembrist" who joined the Canovist project. As Minister of the Interior, he stood out for his electoral "maneuvers" to achieve an overwhelming majority for the Canovas Government, thus inaugurating one of the defining characteristics of the political regime of the Restoration: electoral fraud.

As a result of the electoral maneuvers of Interior Minister Francisco Romero Robledo, the general elections of January 1876 resulted in a sweeping victory for the Canovist faction, which secured 333 of 391 seats in the Congress of Deputies. Official figures indicated abstention rates exceeding 45% overall, and up to 65% in major cities. The Moderate Party won only twelve seats, marking its political collapse. Many of its former members subsequently joined Cánovas's Liberal-Conservative Party. The final blow came when Cánovas raised a cabinet question during the debate on Article 11 of the Constitution, forcing the Moderates to take a public stance against its failure to restore Catholic unity. The Moderate Party formally dissolved in 1882, with its full absorption into the Liberal Conservative Party completed in 1884, when the Catholic Union, founded by Alejandro Pidal, joined the party.

In contrast, Sagasta's Constitutionalists were granted 27 seats as part of a prior agreement. This included a seat for Sagasta himself in Zamora, which he would hold almost continuously. In November 1875, the Constitutionalists had declared their intention to support the monarchy as "the most liberal party of the Government within the constitutional Monarchy of Alfonso XII".

The new Cortes, criticized as Las Cortes de los Milagros due to widespread allegations of electoral fraud, convened on February 15, 1876. Debate on the Constitution was limited, with key provisions—especially those related to the powers of the Crown—excluded from discussion at Cánovas’s request. The Constitution was approved on May 24 in the Congress (by 276 votes to 40) and on June 22 in the Senate (by 130 to 11).

The 1876 Constitution, a concise document of 89 articles and one additional article, represented a synthesis of the Constitutions of 1845 and 1869, though it leaned heavily toward the former. It reaffirmed shared sovereignty between the king and the Cortes, abandoning the principle of national sovereignty espoused in 1869. While it retained a broad declaration of individual rights, it allowed these rights to be restricted or suspended by ordinary legislation.

Ambiguities were deliberately left in key areas to enable both Conservatives and Liberals to govern according to their principles without needing constitutional reform. For example, the issue of suffrage was delegated to future electoral laws. The Electoral Law of 1878 restored restricted suffrage, limiting the vote to about 850,000 men, while the 1890 law, enacted under Sagasta, introduced universal male suffrage, expanding the electorate to approximately 4.5–5 million. Nonetheless, electoral fraud remained systemic, as governments were formed prior to elections and routinely secured overwhelming majorities.

The most contentious issue was the religious question. The Constitution abolished the freedom of public worship recognized in 1869 but did not reinstate the Catholic unity sought by the Moderates. Cánovas personally drafted Article 11, which preserved the confessional character of the state while allowing private worship for other religions.

Art. 11. The Catholic, Apostolic, Roman Religion is that of the State. The Nation is obliged to maintain the cult and its ministers. No one shall be disturbed in Spanish territory for their religious opinions or for the exercise of their respective worship, except for the respect due to Christian morality. However, no ceremonies or public manifestations other than those of the State religion shall be permitted.

Despite initial resistance, the Catholic Church accepted this arrangement, confident that future laws would protect its position. This was later confirmed by the Spanish Cardinal Primate, who acknowledged that Article 11 had safeguarded Catholic interests more effectively than a prohibitive clause would have.

==== Powers of the King: "la regia prerrogativa" ====
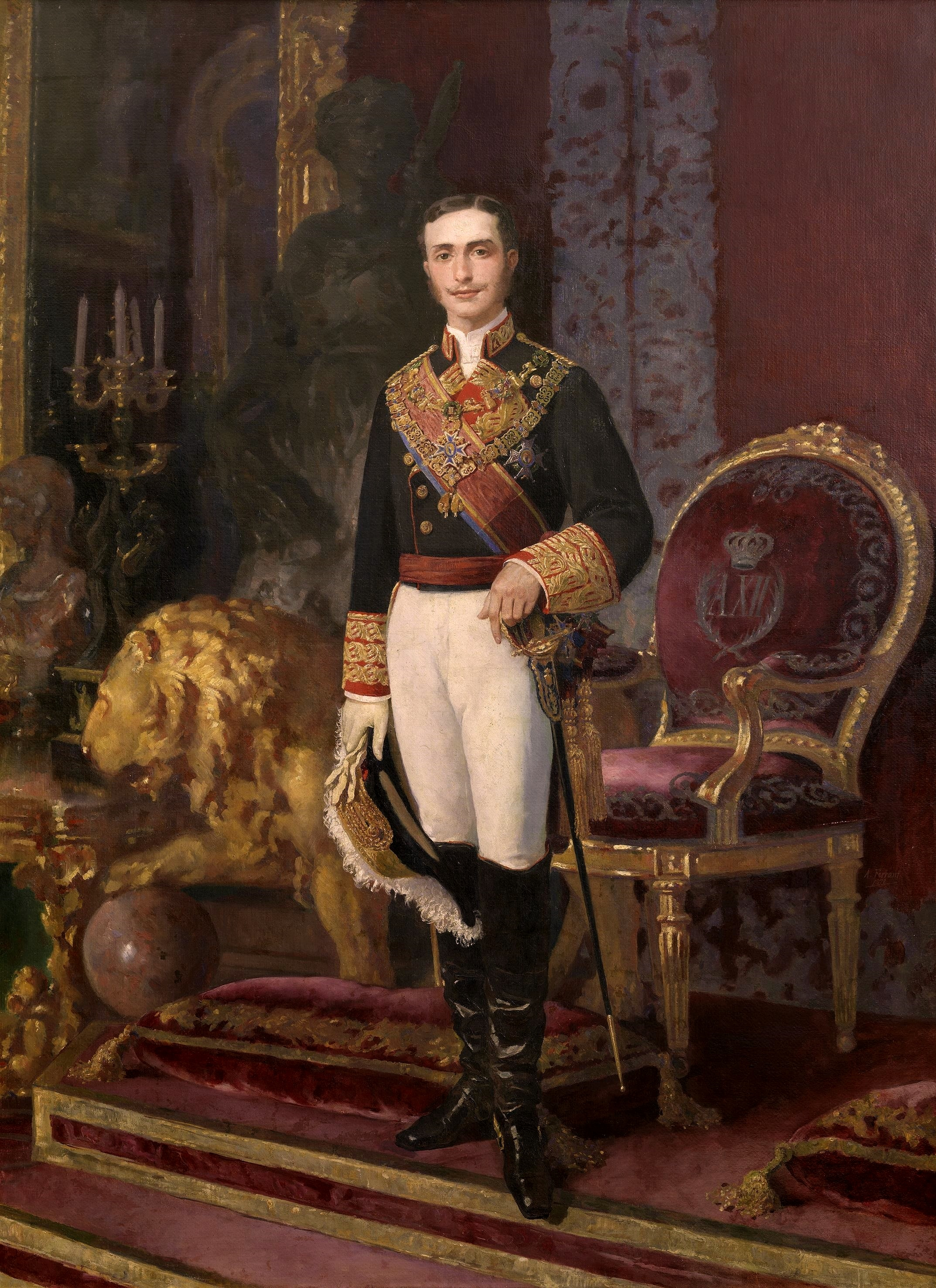
Portrait of Alfonso XII next to the throne and one of the two lions in the Cortes building by Alejandro Ferrant y Fischermans (circa 1875).

For the drafters of the 1876 Constitution, led by Antonio Cánovas del Castillo, the Monarchy was not merely a form of government but the foundational pillar of the Spanish State. Cánovas proposed to the Commission of Notables that the titles and articles referring to the Monarchy be excluded from parliamentary debate, placing it above both ordinary and constitutional legislation. In his view, the Monarchy embodied sovereignty, legality, and continuity, standing above partisan conflicts.

Cánovas believed that both during Isabella II’s reign and the Sexenio Democrático, it was not public opinion that determined who governed, but rather the governments that created the necessary parliamentary majorities through control of the electoral process. "Here the government has been the great corrupter," he stated, lamenting the lack of independence and initiative in the electorate. This view was shared by other political figures, such as Manuel Alonso Martínez, who criticized the imbalance between voters and the government, and Sagasta’s constitutionalists, whose newspaper La Iberia acknowledged the entrenched electoral manipulation.

To guarantee the alternation of liberal factions in power, Cánovas assigned a key role to the Crown as a "moderating power". In practice, it was the monarch—not electoral outcomes—who decided changes in government based on perceived shifts in public opinion. Governments were formed before elections, and the Ministry of the Interior, which controlled the electoral machinery, ensured their victory. This process, known as encasillado, involved negotiating electoral outcomes in advance among political elites. Historian José María Jover noted that the king appointed a prime minister, who then received royal authorization to dissolve the Cortes and call new elections. These elections consistently produced majorities favorable to the government in power.

Carlos Dardé described this royal prerogative—the ability to form a government and call elections—as the "practical exercise of sovereignty," making the monarch the central figure in the system. British ambassador Robert Morier summarized the situation in 1882: "The final decision regarding the political destinies of the nation does not rest in the electoral districts [...] but in another place not defined in the Constitution. He pointed out that while parliamentary majorities were formally required, they were achieved through manipulation directed by the Interior Ministry, with the Crown controlling access to this apparatus.

However, the monarch’s role as "moderating power" was not without complications. Ramón Villares likened the king’s position to that of a "pilot without a compass," possessing great authority but lacking reliable instruments to exercise it effectively. Jover, following José Varela Ortega, posed the same dilemma: without genuine electoral indicators, the monarch based decisions on a leader’s ability to maintain party unity and dominate their respective faction within the bipartisan system established by the Restoration.

The principle of shared sovereignty between the King and the Cortes, enshrined in Article 18 of the 1876 Constitution ("the power to make laws resides in the Cortes with the King"), provided the legal foundation for the Crown’s role in distributing political power. This granted the monarchy a personal and extraordinary—though not absolute—authority, justified, according to Antonio Cánovas del Castillo, by the absence of an electorate independent from government influence. "The Monarchy among us has to be a real and effective, decisive, moderating and directing force, because there is no other in the country," Cánovas affirmed. His close ally Manuel Alonso Martínez echoed this, stating that the monarchy had to assume functions that, in a fully representative regime, would be carried out by the electoral body. As historian Ramón Villares noted, the monarch held "all the keys to the political system of the Restoration," and governments required the "double confidence" of both the Cortes and the King. According to Article 49, no royal decree could be enacted without a minister’s endorsement; in cases of disagreement, the king either had to dismiss the government or yield to its stance.

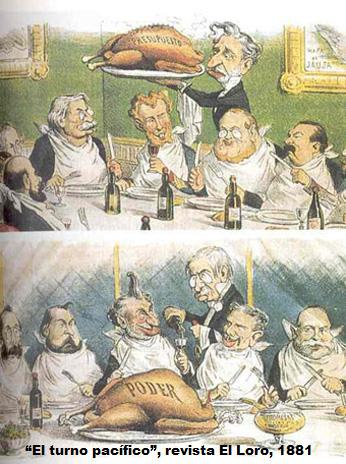
Caricature from El Loro (1881) about "the peaceful turn" between the two great parties of the Restoration: conservatives and liberals. In the image above it is the liberal leader Sagasta who serves the table of the conservative government presided by Cánovas. In the image below, it is Cánovas who does the same with the liberal government presided by Sagasta.

The monarchy thus became the axis of the Restoration regime. The "royal prerogative" referred to the Crown’s power to arbitrate political life, a long-standing goal of Cánovas: to establish a monarchy that was real, effective, and stabilizing in the absence of a mature electorate. However, Suárez Cortina emphasized that this came at the cost of systematic electoral fraud. Political life became a fiction, where the will of the voters was replaced by that of the monarch. The arrangement provided stability, but it was disconnected from the national will and served the interests of the conservative bourgeoisie following the upheaval of the democratic Sexenio".

Carlos Dardé concurred, noting that placing the distribution of power in royal hands rendered pronunciamientos obsolete and discouraged genuine electoral competition. While party rivalry was not eliminated—the king had to consider their social bases—it was weakened, delaying broader political engagement. This reinforced clientelism, where access to state resources depended more on loyalty and connections than on merit or policy. With the judiciary also under political influence, corruption flourished unchecked, as Joaquín Romero Maura observed, "with no brake but individual morality." Even the king admitted in private that his goal to "moralize the Spanish public administration" had failed and that this failure was met with widespread indifference.

As José María Jover emphasized, any analysis of the 1876 Constitution must begin with the recognition that the political dynamics outlined in its text—particularly the role of the electorate and parliamentary majorities in forming or dismissing governments—were never intended to function in practice. The system’s architects anticipated a gap between formal provisions and political reality. This duality, between the formal constitution and the actual operation of political life, allowed parties to implement their programs from positions of power while using public funds and administrative appointments to reward loyal supporters—often driven as much by material gain as by ideology.

=== End of the Carlist war: the "soldier King" ===
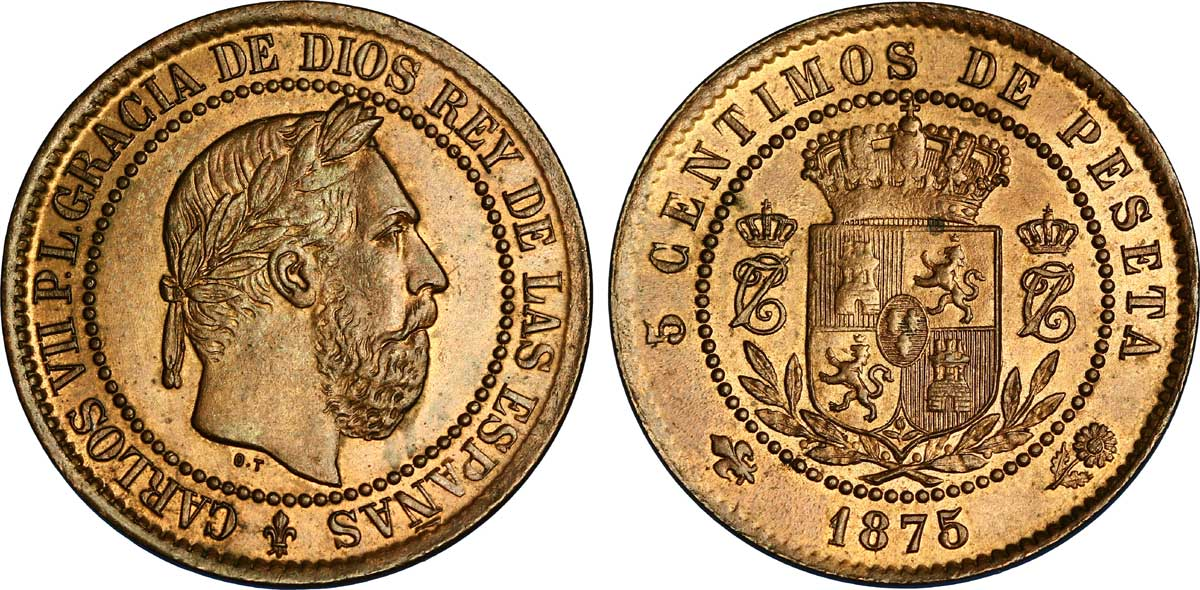
Carlist coin of five peseta cents with the effigy of the pretender Charles VII. The Carlists had constituted in the Basque Country and Navarre an embryo of State with capital in Estella.

One of the main priorities of Cánovas del Castillo's conservative government was to end the two ongoing conflicts: the war in Cuba and the Third Carlist War. Politically, the government aimed to erode the Carlists' support among Catholic sectors and the clergy. To this end, it revised the anti-religious measures enacted during the Sexenio Democrático, and in May 1875, lodged a complaint with the Vatican over its perceived lack of cooperation and tacit support for a rebellious clergy. A notable achievement was convincing former Carlist general Ramón Cabrera, then in London, to recognize Alfonso XII and denounce Catholic divisions. In response, the Carlist pretender Carlos VII stripped Cabrera of his honors and titles. According to Carlos Seco Serrano, Cabrera’s change of allegiance stemmed largely from his favorable impression of Prince Alfonso during a visit to Sandhurst. In return, Cabrera was granted the rank of captain general and noble titles.

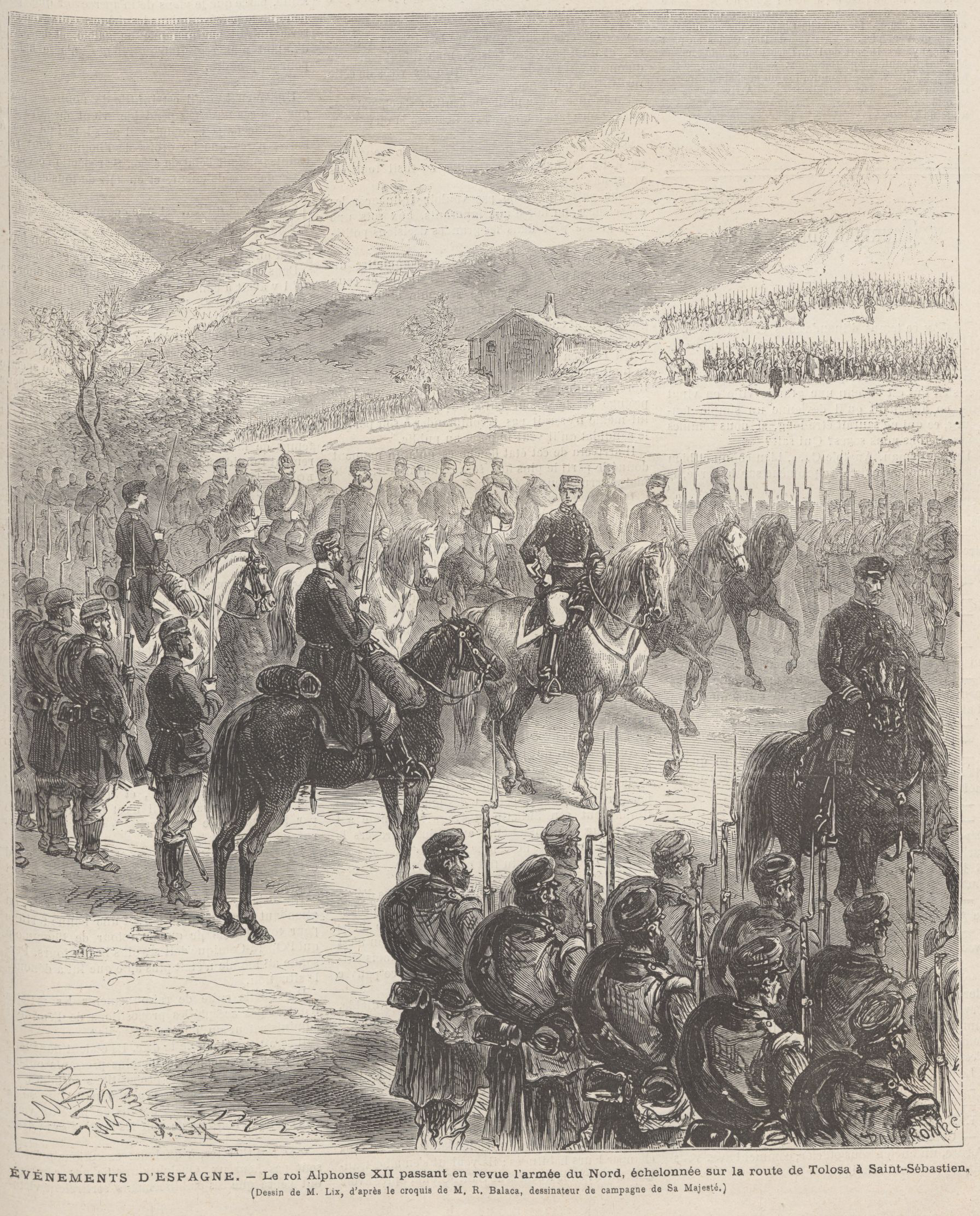
Engraving published on March 11, 1876 showing King Alfonso XII reviewing the Army of the North deployed in the Basque Country and Navarre to fight the Carlists.

Militarily, the first campaign, led by War Minister General Jovellar, targeted the Carlist "center" zone—covering parts of Aragon, Catalonia, Valencia, and Castile—where guerrilla forces were active. After the fall of key strongholds such as Miravet and Cantavieja June 1875, General Dorregaray's forces were forced to retreat to the Basque provinces, a move some Carlists saw as betrayal. With the central front neutralized, the army turned to Catalonia, where General Martínez Campos captured La Seu d'Urgell in August after a prolonged siege, consolidating control over the region. The final campaign focused on the Carlist stronghold in the Basque Country and Navarre, where a proto-state and regular army had been established. A coordinated pincer movement from Navarre and Biscay culminated in the capture of Estella on February 19, 1876, following the decisive Battle of Montejurra led by General Fernando Primo de Rivera. Carlos VII fled to France by the end of the month.

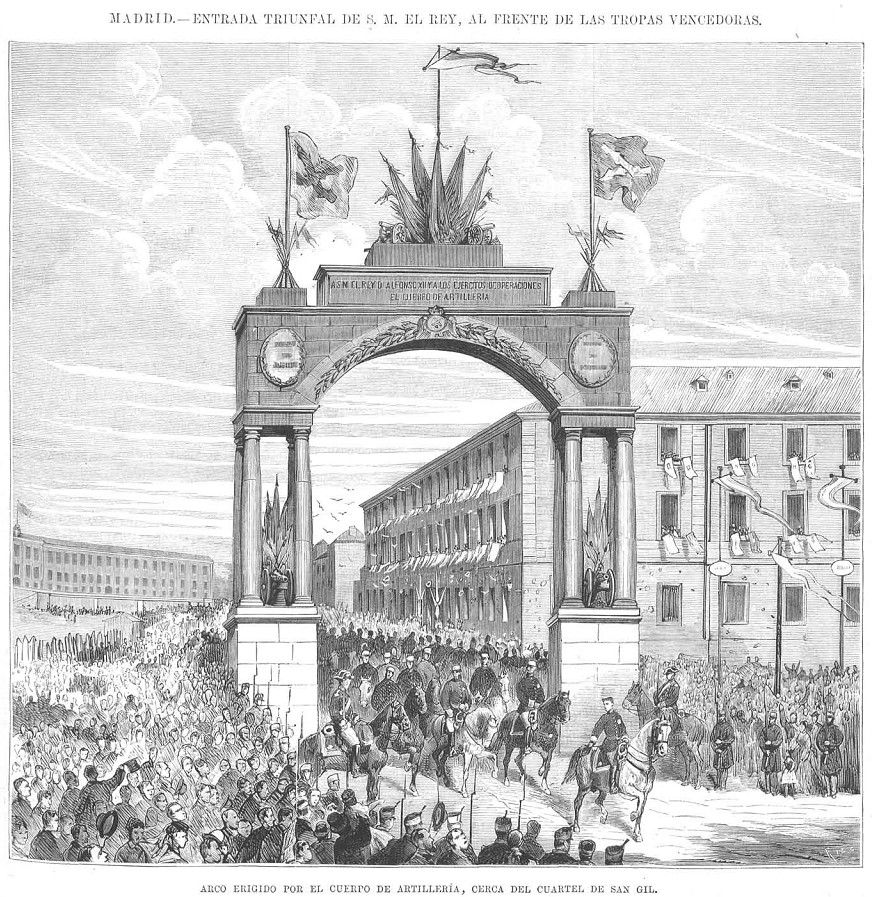
Entrance in Madrid of King Alfonso XII after the victory over the Carlists (the triumphal arch was erected by the artillery corps in honor of the king and the army of operations). Engraving from La Ilustración Española y Americana, March 30, 1876.

Cánovas ensured that Alfonso XII assumed personal command of the northern campaign, reinforcing his image as a “soldier-king.” The king entered San Sebastián and Pamplona at the head of his troops, coinciding with Carlos VII’s departure from Spain. In his victory proclamation, Alfonso XII embraced this role:

I will never forget your deeds; do not forget, on the other hand, that you will always find me ready to leave the Palace of my elders to occupy a tent in your camps; to place myself in front of you and that in the service of the fatherland I will run, if necessary, mixed with yours, the blood of your King.

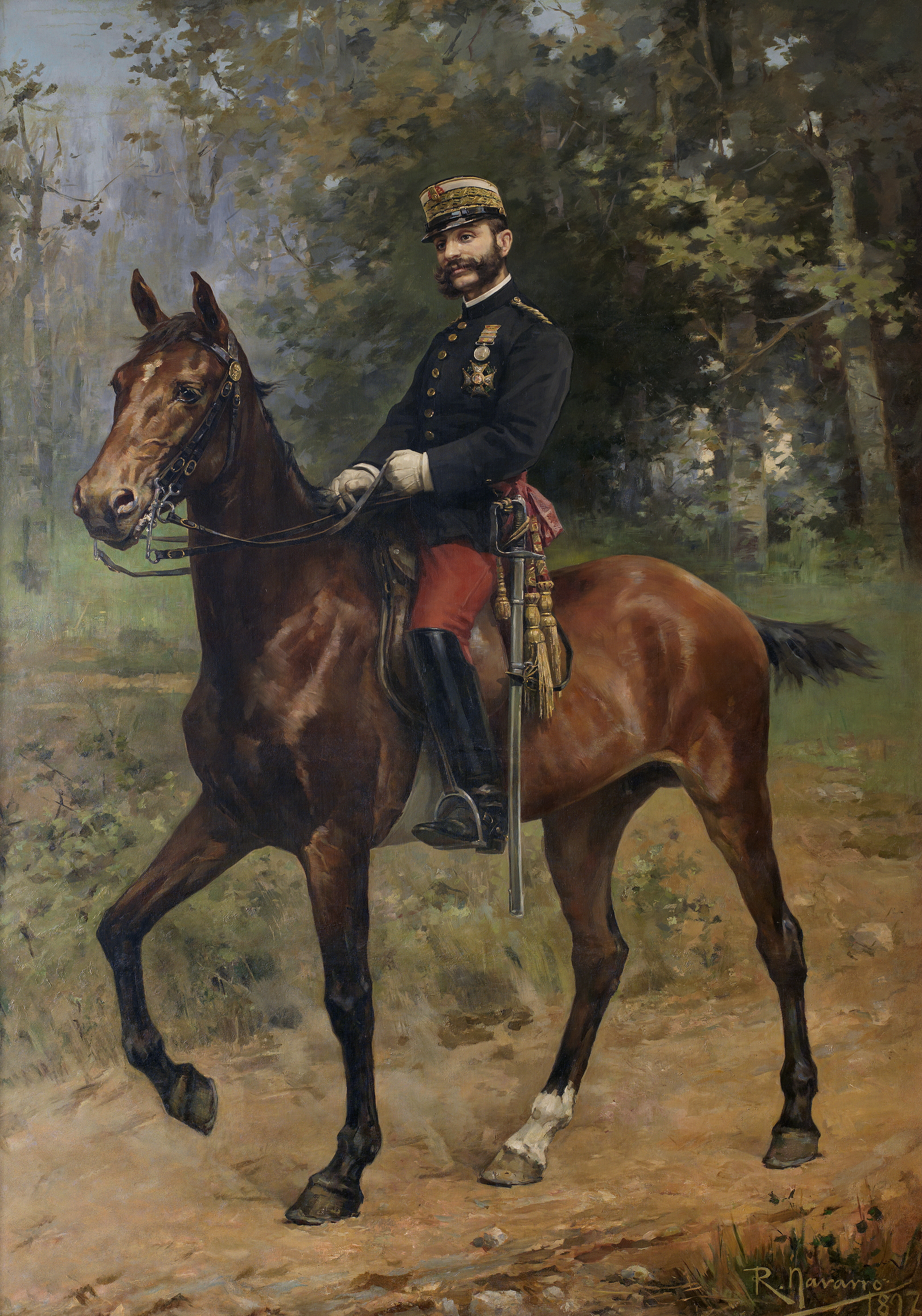
Equestrian portrait of Alfonso XII painted by Román Navarro twelve years after his death (1897). It shows the monarch in his role of "soldier-king".

In the "Somorrostro Proclamation" of March 3, the king called for reconciliation: "No one should be humiliated by his defeat; in the end, the victor's brother is the vanquished". Upon his return to Madrid, Alfonso XII was received with popular acclaim and hailed as "The Peacemaker".

The monarch’s military role—unusual in 19th-century Spain outside Carlism—was formally codified in the 1876 Constitution: Article 52 granted the king supreme command of the armed forces, and Article 53 authorized him to confer military ranks and rewards. The 1878 Constitutive Law of the Army further reinforced this by allowing the king to command personally without requiring ministerial countersignature and by giving him decisive influence over military appointments.

According to Cánovas, these powers were designed not to militarize the monarchy but to “civilize” Spanish political life by removing the army from active politics and preventing military interventionism. This goal was largely achieved, as seen in the limited scope and failure of the few republican uprisings that followed. Alfonso XII later credited himself with the success of excluding the military from public life.

=== "Abolition of the Basque fueros" ===
Following the defeat of the Carlists, Cánovas del Castillo addressed the long-standing issue of integrating the Basque provinces into the constitutional framework of the monarchy. This matter had remained unresolved since the 1839 Law of Confirmation of Fueros, passed after the end of the First Carlist War. While Navarre had reached an agreement with the central government through the 1841 Ley Paccionada, the Basque provinces—Álava, Gipuzkoa, and Biscay—had retained more foral (regional) privileges, despite a 1844 royal decree that introduced some centralizing reforms.

In April 1876, Cánovas summoned representatives from the three provinces to discuss the implementation of the 1839 law, but no consensus was reached. As a result, the government pushed through the Law of July 21, 1876, which the Basque authorities labeled the “abolitory law” and refused to apply. While the law did not dismantle the fueros entirely—it maintained the Juntas and Diputaciones—it abolished the key exemptions that contradicted constitutional unity, particularly regarding military conscription and taxation. Article 1 of the law stated:

The duties that the political Constitution has always imposed on all Spaniards to go to the military service when the law calls them, and to contribute, in proportion to their assets, to the expenses of the State, will be extended, as the constitutional rights are extended, to the inhabitants of the provinces of Biscay, Gipuzkoa and Alava, in the same way as to all the rest of the nation.

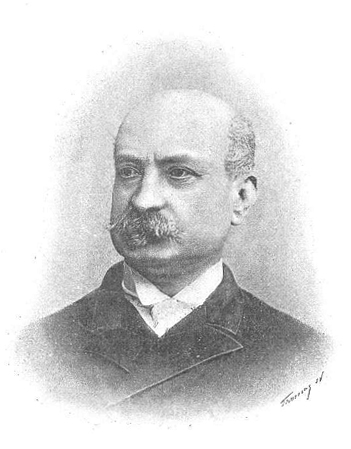
Fidel Sagarmínaga, General Deputy of Biscay, was one of the maximum representatives of the intransigent position. He rejected the law of July 1876 and refused to negotiate with the government, as the provincial councils of Alava and Gipuzkoa had already begun to do. For this reason the Provincial Council of Biscay was suppressed in May 1877, being replaced by an ordinary Provincial Deputation. The same thing would end up happening six months later to the Provincial Councils of Alava and Gipuzkoa because they still did not recognize the abolitionist law of July 1876.

The law sparked widespread outrage. While local institutions were not formally dissolved, their leaders denounced the measure as a violation of their traditional rights and liberties. According to historian Luis Castells, Cánovas did not aim to eliminate the entire foral system, but sought to enforce constitutional uniformity in military and fiscal matters, drawing inspiration from Navarre’s 1841 model. Ironically, years earlier, Cánovas had praised Basque institutions in a book prologue.

The Basque authorities publicly refused to cooperate, triggering a two-year standoff. For example, in early 1877, efforts to implement conscription were obstructed, and anti-law publications were censored. Over time, moderate (“transigent”) factions gained influence in Gipuzkoa and Álava, favoring negotiation with Madrid. In contrast, Biscay, led by General Deputy Fidel Sagarmínaga, remained staunchly opposed.

In May 1877, the government dissolved the Biscayan Diputación, replacing it with a standard provincial council. Six months later, the same was done in Gipuzkoa and Álava after continued resistance. Castells notes that only at this point could one speak of a real abolition of the fueros, although their legacy endured.

With moderate leaders now in control, negotiations resumed, culminating in the Royal Decree of February 28, 1878, which incorporated the three provinces into Spain’s "economic agreement" system. Under this arrangement—similar to Navarre’s—the provincial councils would collect taxes and remit an agreed quota to the State. Historian Feliciano Montero described this concierto económico as a pragmatic compromise that initially met little resistance but left a lingering sense of grievance that would later fuel Basque nationalism.

The agreement was especially well-received by the Basque bourgeoisie, particularly in Biscay, where industrialization was accelerating. As José Luis de la Granja points out, the system relied mainly on indirect taxes and imposed few direct levies, making it economically favorable. Castells adds that while political autonomy was curtailed, the provinces retained significant administrative and fiscal autonomy under the concierto system, resulting in a comparatively lighter tax burden—something Cánovas himself acknowledged. In the 1879 general elections, the transigents triumphed. From that point, the Basque provinces were integrated into the Restoration Monarchy—without their fueros, but with the conciertos. This provided substantial economic and administrative autonomy, though not political self-governance.

=== Religious policy: the application of Article 11 of the Constitution ===
Following the approval of the 1876 Constitution—opposed by Catholic sectors for not recognizing Catholic unity—the debate shifted to the application of Article 11. This article granted limited religious tolerance, restricted to the private sphere: "No one shall be disturbed in Spanish territory for their religious opinions or the exercise of their respective worship, except for the respect due to Christian morality. However, no ceremonies or public manifestations other than those of the State religion will be allowed". To reassure the Catholic hierarchy, Prime Minister Cánovas issued a circular on October 23, 1876, instructing civil governors to interpret Article 11 restrictively. Public acts by non-Catholic groups, including ceremonies visible in streets or on temple exteriors, were deemed prohibited. The opening of dissenting temples or schools had to be reported to local authorities, and schools were to operate separately from places of worship. These guidelines were contested by more liberal cabinet members, such as Manuel Alonso Martínez and José Luis Albareda, as well as by foreign diplomats, particularly the British ambassador.

A new dispute arose when the government introduced a Public Instruction bill in December 1876. Opposed by the bishops, who were supported by the Vatican, the bill was withdrawn and postponed until 1885. The hierarchy objected to the establishment of compulsory primary education, which they saw as a move toward state monopoly over education, diminishing the Church’s role. The bill also subordinated episcopal oversight of educational content—recognized in the still-valid Concordat of 1851—to state inspection. In 1885, during Cánovas's second term, Public Works Minister Alejandro Pidal y Mon issued a decree favoring private religious education, which subsequently expanded significantly.

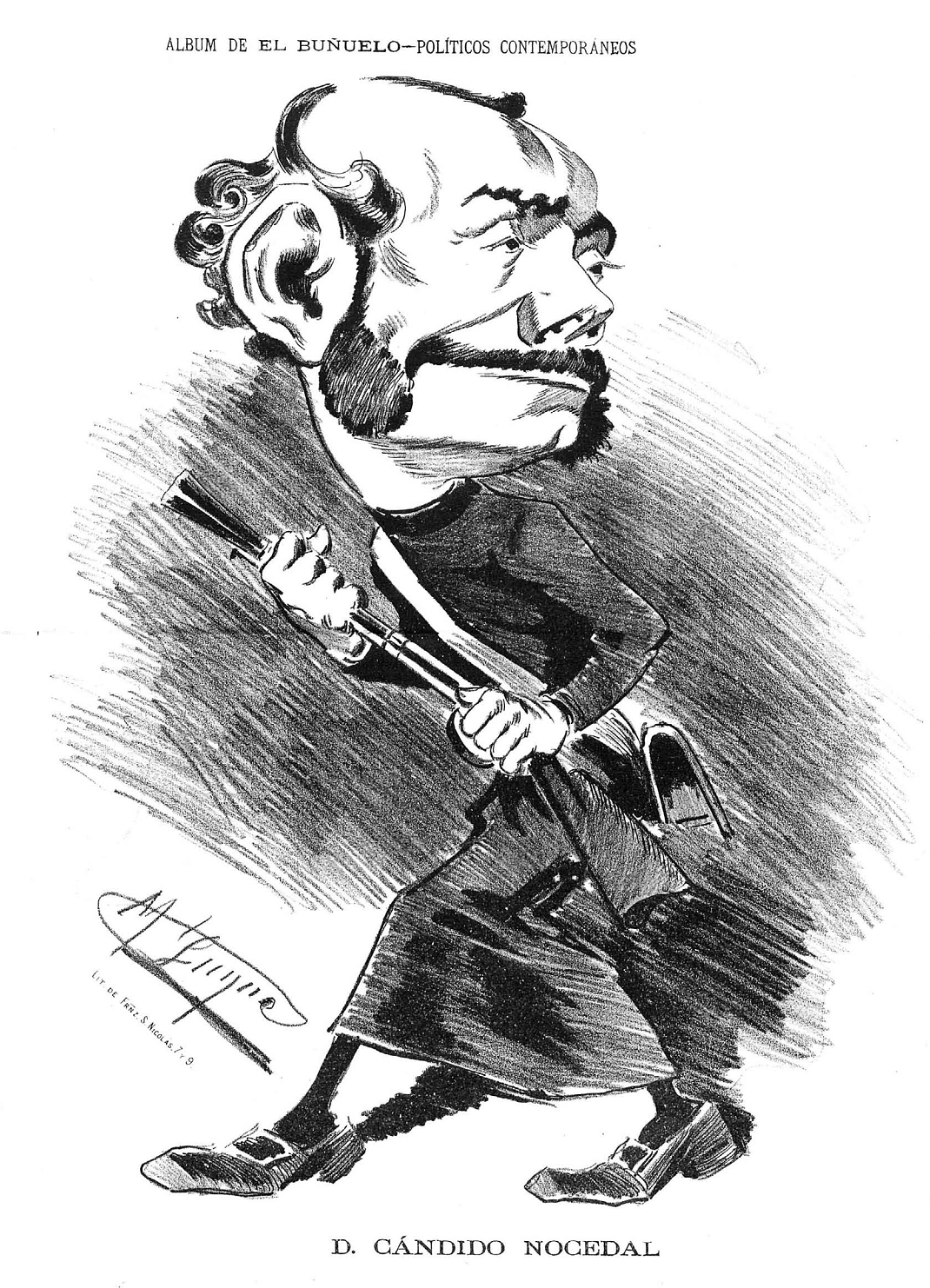
Caricature of El Buñuelo (March 13, 1881) of the integralist Carlist leader Cándido Nocedal, director of El Siglo Futuro, depicted with cassock and blunderbuss, like the priests of the Carlist parties. He strongly opposed the Catholic possibilism advocated by the new Pope Leo XIII and represented in Spain by Alejandro Pidal y Mon, founder of the Catholic Union.

Another conflict centered on canonical marriage. A decree in February 1875 restored full civil recognition to religious marriages, reversing the 1870 law from the Democratic Sexennium. Tensions resurfaced in 1880 with a new bill on the civil effects of marriage, which the Church rejected for allowing state regulation of a sacrament. After prolonged negotiations, the Holy See in 1887 acknowledged the state's authority to regulate civil aspects of religious marriage. This agreement was incorporated into the Civil Code of 1889.

Cánovas also sought Vatican support in marginalizing fundamentalist Catholics who rejected the restored monarchy due to its failure to uphold Catholic unity. Many of these were bishops aligned with traditionalist-Carlist positions. The accession of Pope Leo XIII in 1878 improved relations, as he adopted a more conciliatory stance toward liberal regimes. This shift led to the founding of the Catholic Union in 1881, led by Pidal y Mon and backed by the hierarchy, aiming to unite Carlist and Alfonsist Catholics. However, it remained a minority compared to the traditionalist faction led by Cándido Nocedal, editor of El Siglo Futuro. Tensions peaked during the 1882 pilgrimage to Rome honoring Pius IX, which Nocedal used to discredit the Catholic Union. The Vatican ultimately distanced itself from the initiative. In response, Pope Leo XIII issued the encyclical Cum Multa, addressed to Spanish Catholics, urging them to avoid equating religion with political factions and warning against internal divisions. Despite this intervention, the split within Spanish Catholicism persisted.

=== War in Cuba: the "Peace of Zanjón", the brief government of Martínez Campos (February–December 1879) and the return of Cánovas ===
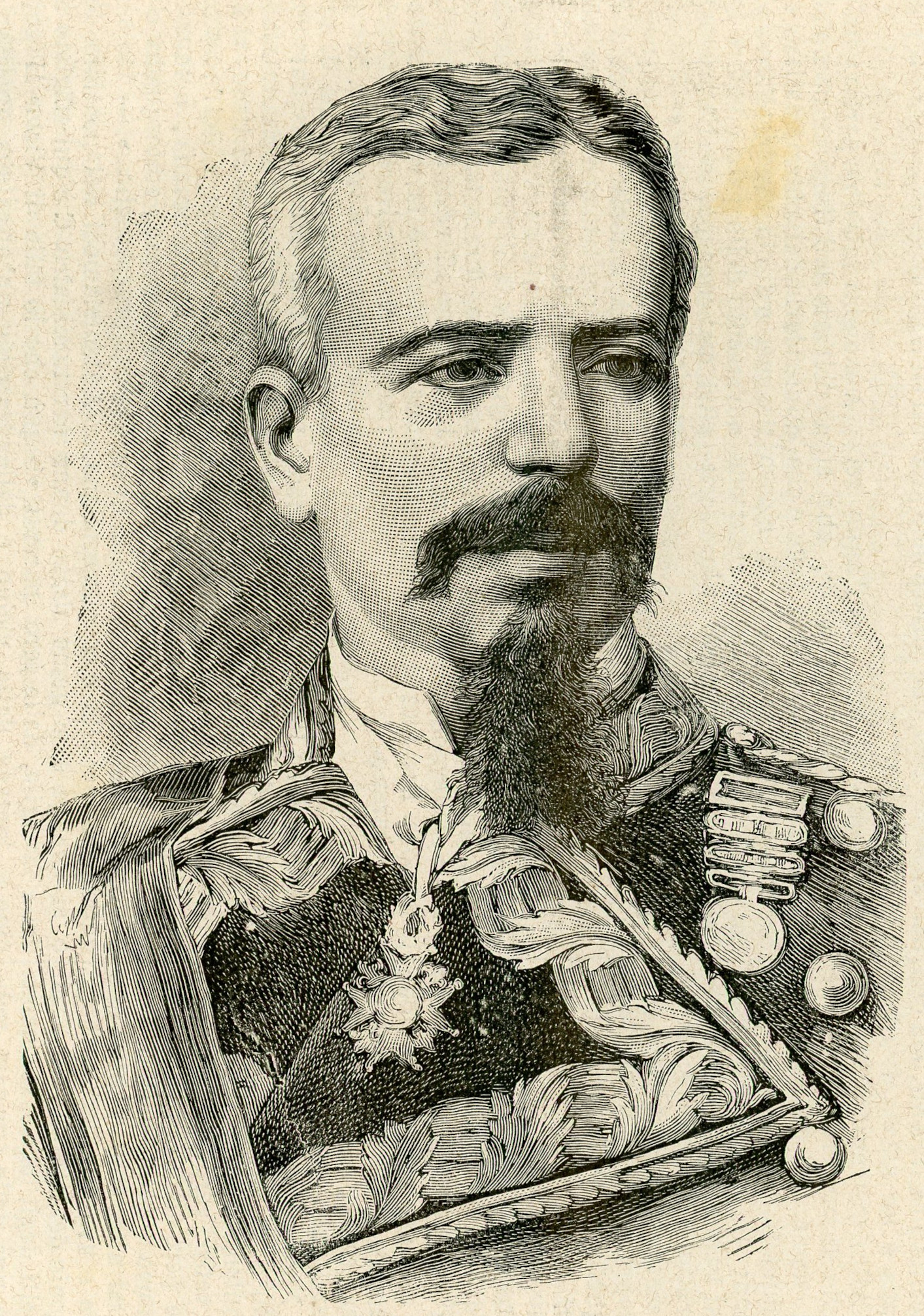
General Arsenio Martínez Campos.

After the victory in the Third Carlist War, Cánovas's government turned its attention to ending the ongoing conflict in Cuba, which had begun in October 1868 and caused nearly 100,000 deaths—over 90% due to disease. Between 42,000 and 70,000 Spanish troops were sent to the island to confront about 7,000 insurgents, and a loan of 200 million pesetas was secured from the newly established Banco Hispano Colonial to finance the campaign. General Martinez Campos, appointed to lead military operations, arrived in November 1876. He implemented more humane policies aimed at reducing popular support for the insurgency, particularly among rural populations, and took advantage of growing divisions within the rebel ranks.

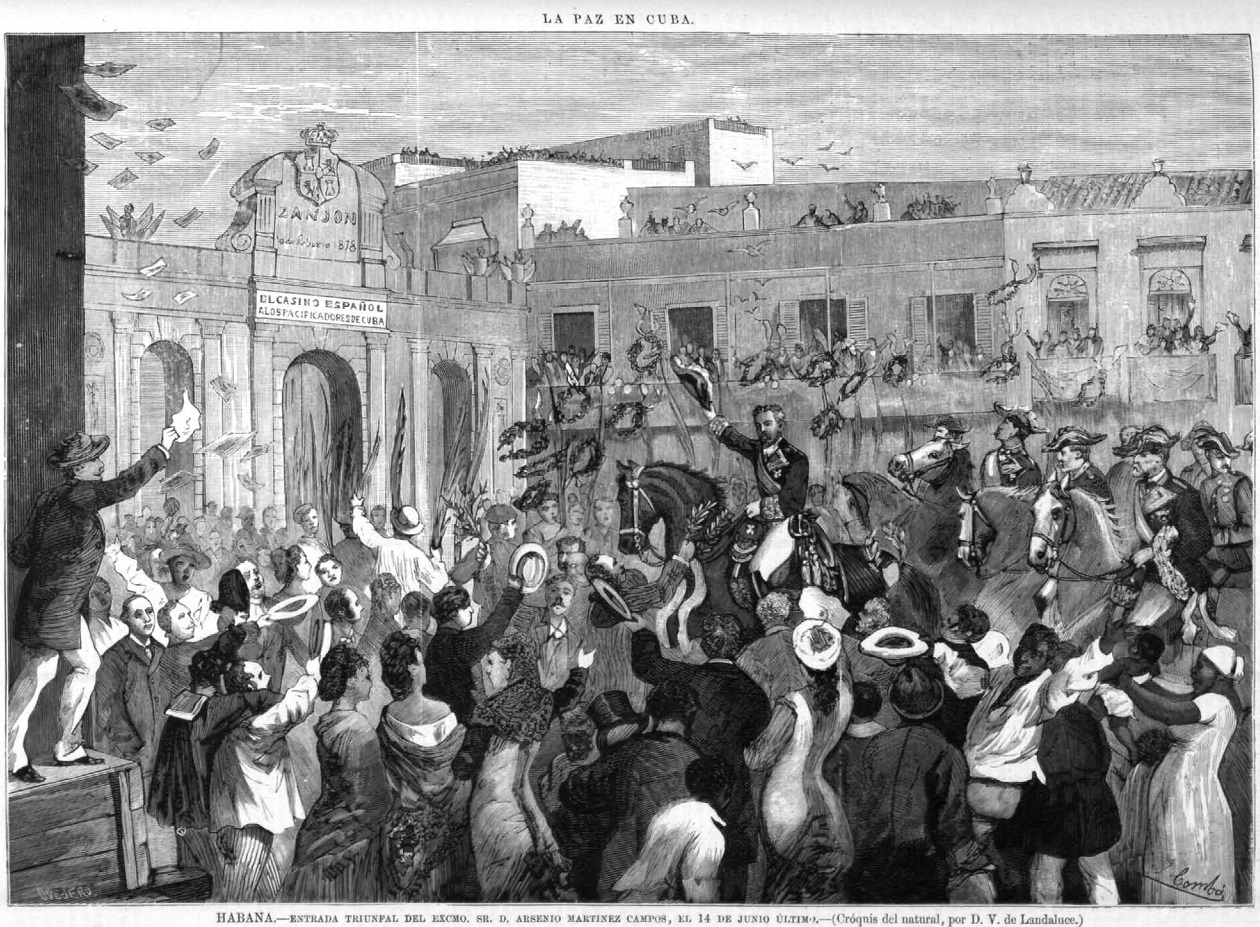
Triumphal entrance of General Martínez Campos in Havana after the signing of the Peace of Zanjón that put an end to the Ten Years' War (La Ilustración Española y Americana, June 14, 1878).

In late 1877, Martínez Campos opened negotiations with the rebels, culminating in the signing of the Zanjón Agreement on February 10, 1878. It granted Cuba the same political and administrative status as Puerto Rico". The "peace of Zanjón" was widely seen as a turning point, marking the beginning of a new era of formal liberties for Cubans. However, some planters and slave owners opposed the agreement, believing too many concessions had been made to the rebels; one critic called it "the thousand times cursed peace of Zanjón".

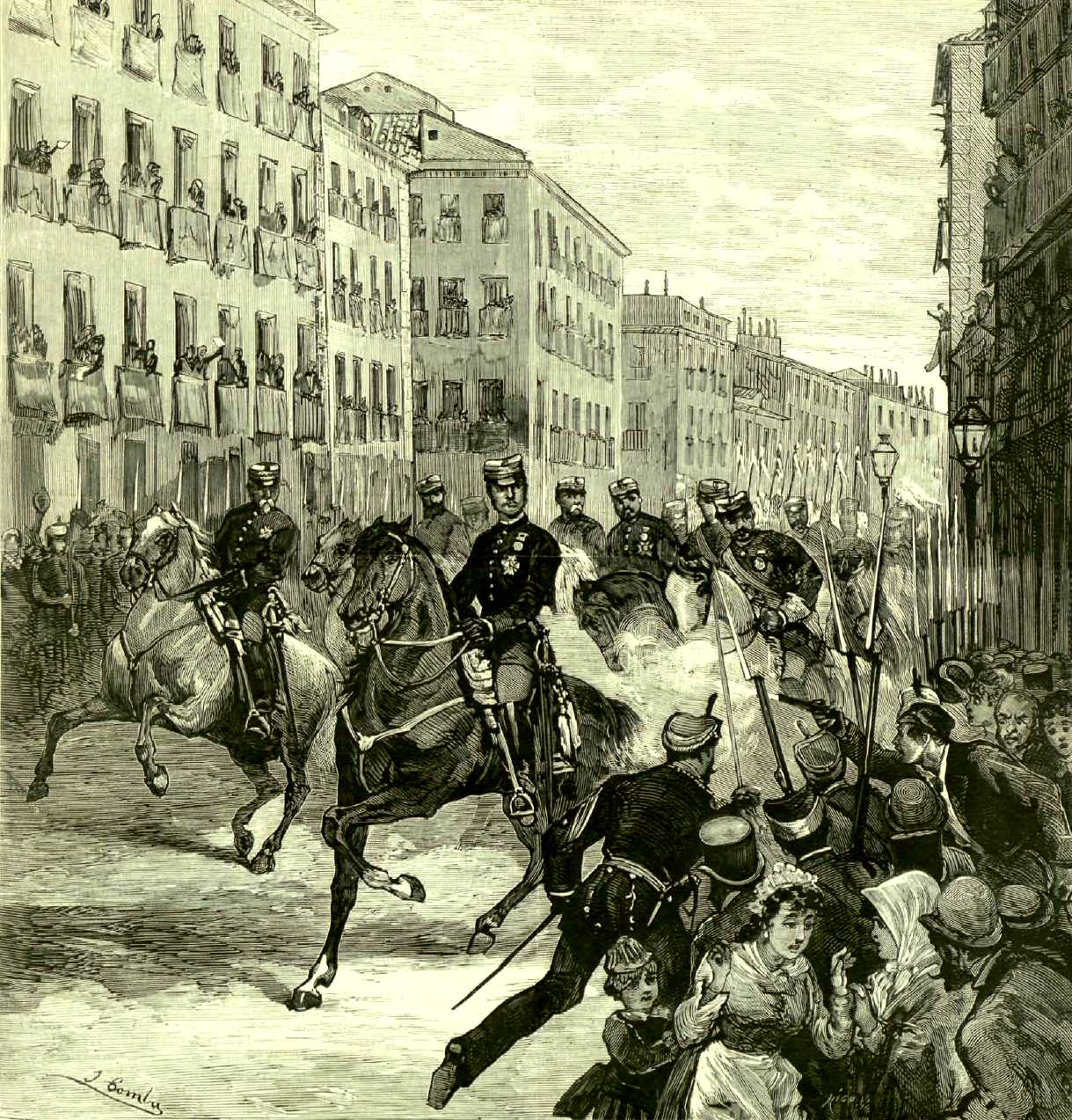
Engraving that reconstructs the attack against Alfonso XII as he passed on horseback through the Calle Mayor in Madrid, from which he was unharmed (October 23, 1878). The author of the attempted assassination, Juan Oliva Moncusí, who declared that he belonged to the IWA, was arrested on the spot. He would be executed by garrotte on January 4, 1879.

The end of the Cuban war was overshadowed by the illness and death of Queen Maria de las Mercedes of Orleans. Diagnosed with "essential toxic fever" (a euphemism for typhus), she died on June 26, 1878, two days after her 18th birthday and just five months after her marriage to Alfonso XII. Four months later, on October 23, the king survived an assassination attempt on Madrid’s Calle Mayor. The assailant, Juan Oliva Moncusí, a self-declared member of the International Workingmen’s Association, was arrested and executed on January 4, 1879. In response, Cánovas accelerated plans for the king’s remarriage to secure dynastic continuity. Alfonso XII accepted, leaving the choice to Cánovas, who selected Archduchess Maria Christina of Habsburg-Lorraine, a 21-year-old Catholic and niece of Emperor Franz Joseph I of Austria. The wedding took place on November 29, 1879, at the Basilica of Atocha, attended by former Queen Isabella II.

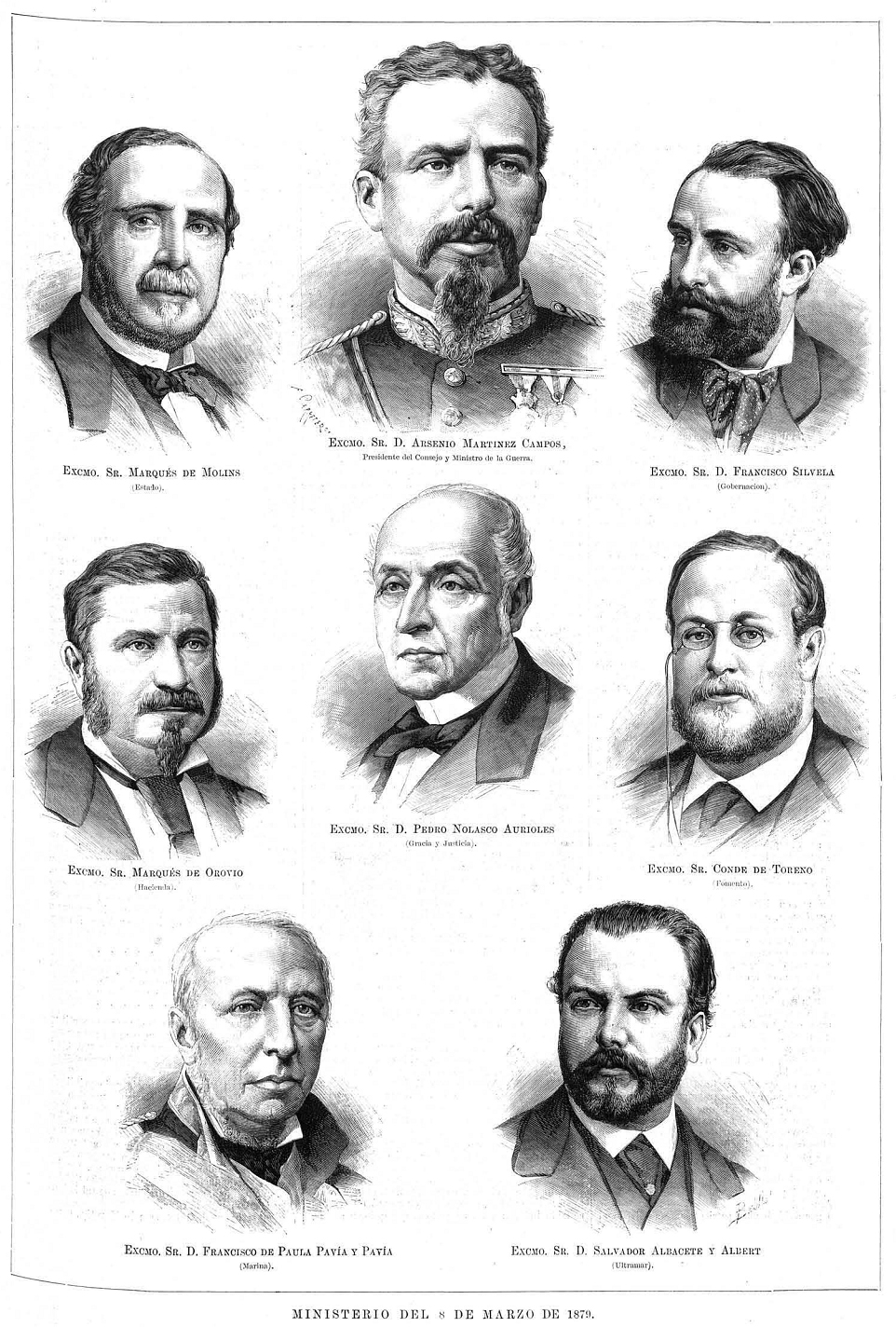
Government presided over by General Arsenio Martínez Campos (above center). Below right Salvador Albacete, Minister of Overseas Territories.

Martínez Campos returned to Spain in early 1879, convinced that only political and economic reforms could prevent future uprisings in Cuba. On March 7, he became Prime Minister, due to both his prestige and the difficulties Cánovas faced in implementing parts of the Zanjón Agreement, which he did not fully support. Although Sagasta's constitutionalists protested at being excluded from power, their party was still weak, and key figures like General Serrano had yet to fully accept the restored monarchy, remaining involved in republican efforts. According to José Varela Ortega, Cánovas advised the king to appoint Martínez Campos to counter these "revolutionary threats" with a respected and victorious general.

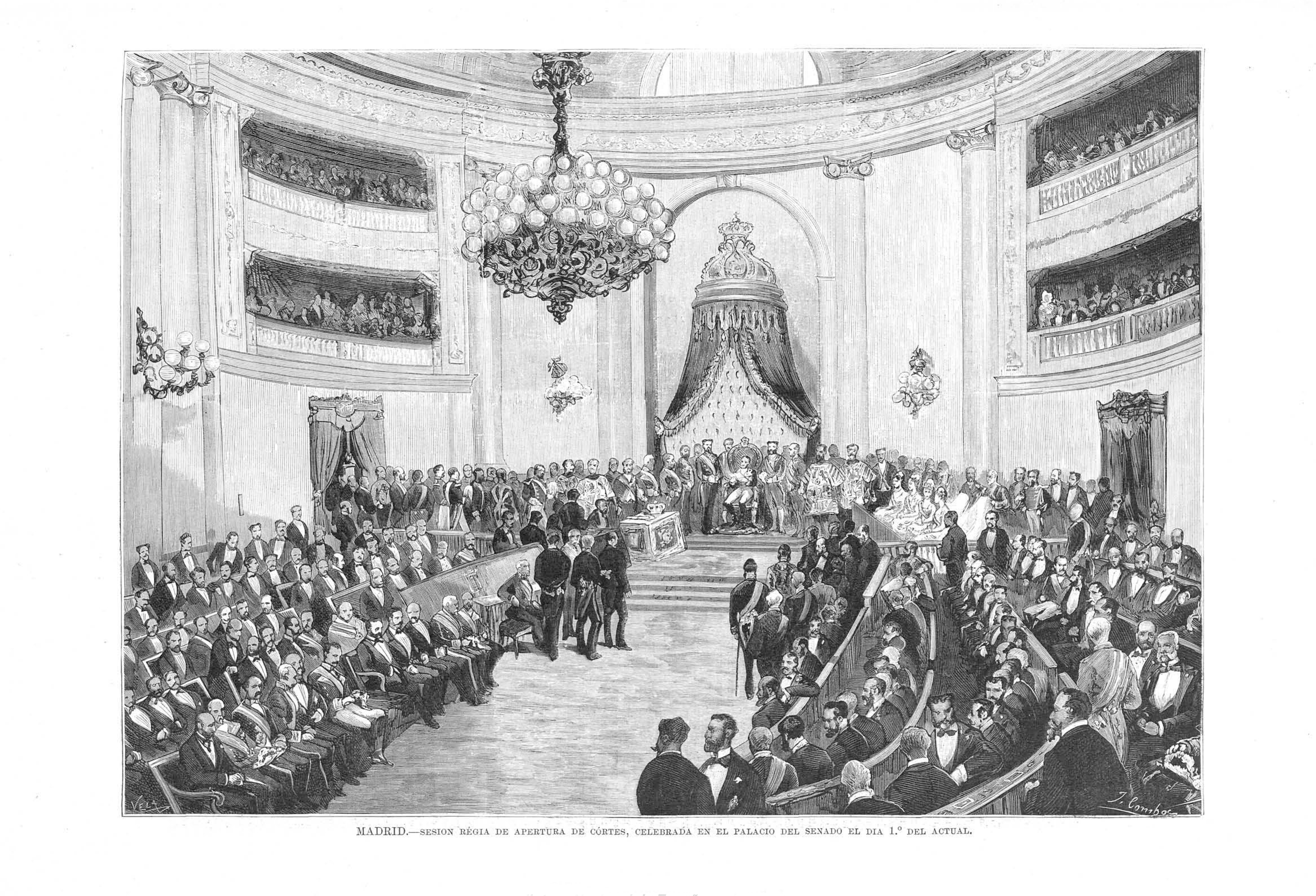
Opening session of the Cortes held in the Senate Palace on July 1, 1878 (La Ilustración Española y Americana, July 8, 1878).

Despite leaving office, Cánovas retained political control, as confirmed by the general elections of April 20 and May 3, 1879. Held under the new Electoral Law of 1878—which restricted suffrage to male citizens over 25 who met economic or educational qualifications—only 847,000 men were eligible to vote. The law also enfranchised certain professionals and public officials, such as clergy, military officers, and high-ranking civil servants. Through electoral manipulation, the Liberal-Conservative Party, led by Cánovas, secured a dominant majority: 293 deputies versus 56 from Sagasta’s Constitutional Party. As a result, Martínez Campos was politically dependent on Cánovas. Following the opening of the new Cortes, the president of the Congress welcomed Cuban representatives—their first seating since their expulsion in 1837—and encouraged their full participation in the affairs of the monarchy.

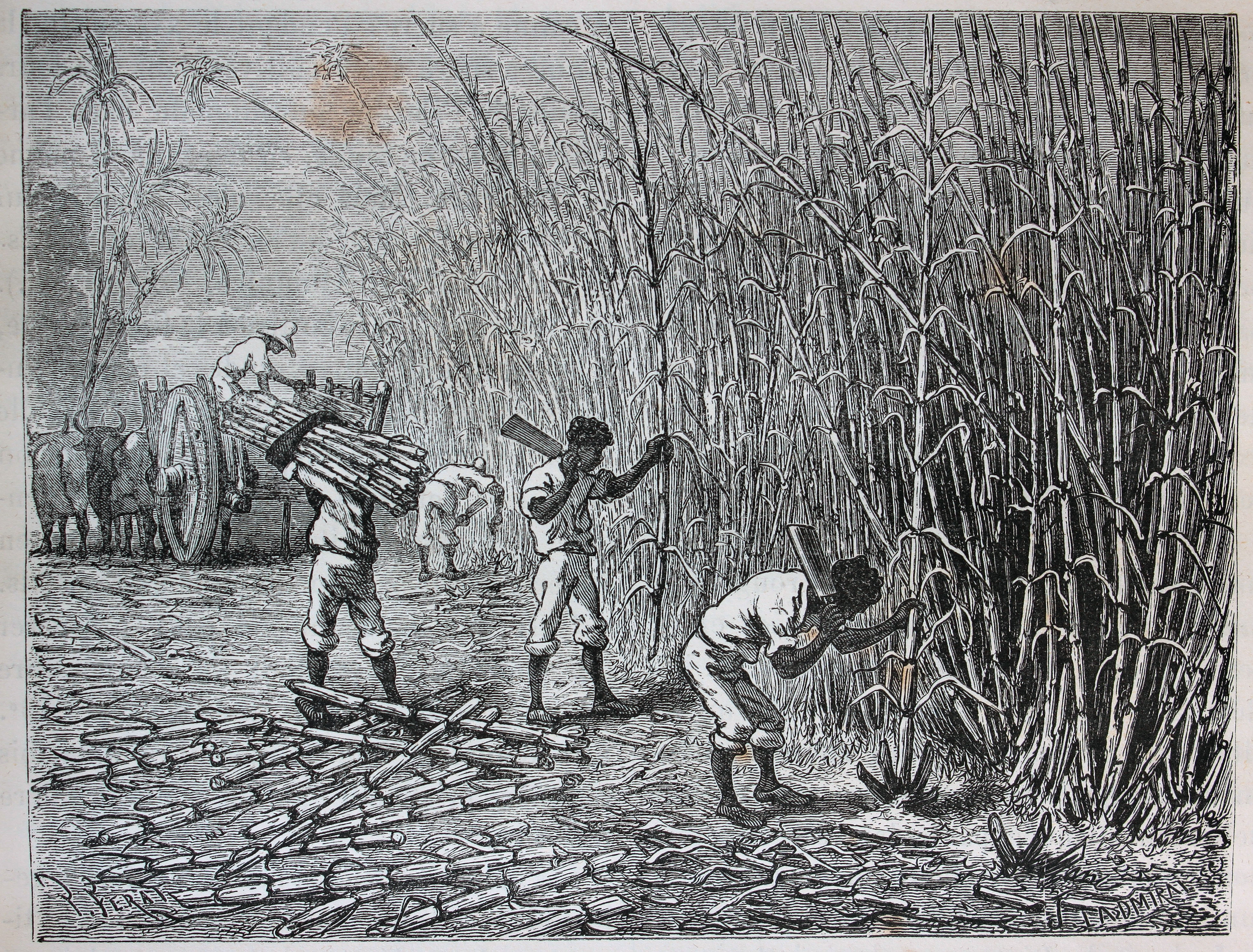
Slaves working on a sugar cane plantation in Cuba.

The abolition of slavery in Cuba—where around 200,000 enslaved people remained—was addressed by a bill introduced to the Cortes by Prime Minister Martínez Campos. The proposal included a transitional system known as patronato, under which former slave owners retained limited control over their former slaves for eight years. They were required to pay wages, provide food, clothing, medical care, and primary education for children. Despite its gradual approach, the bill faced strong opposition from plantation owners and their political allies. Debate was postponed until December 5 due to preparations for the king’s wedding on November 29.

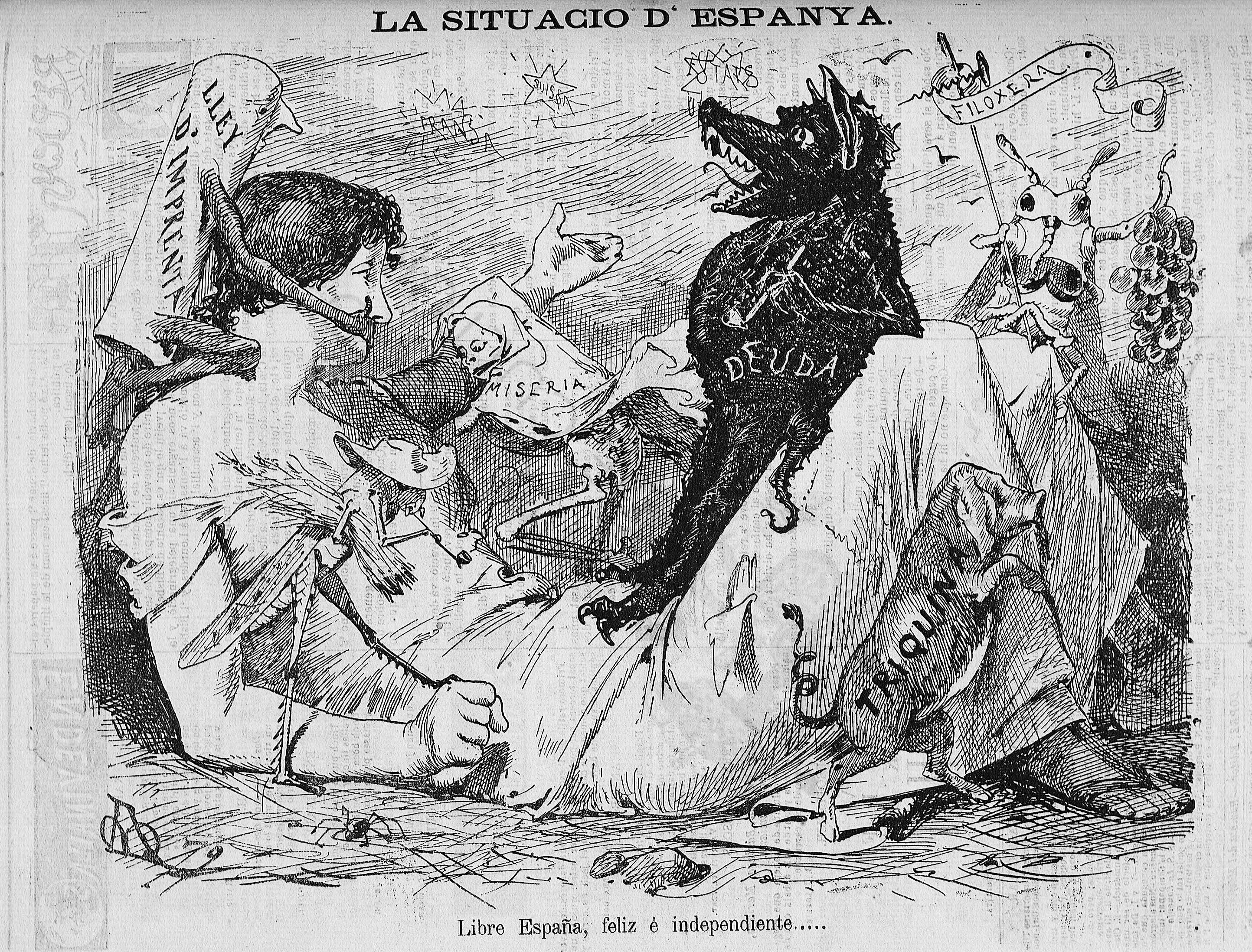
La situació d'Espanya (La Campana de Gracia, July 27, 1879). The caption reads: "Free Spain, happy and independent...". Spain is represented by a woman gagged by the Printing Law and besieged by misery, debt, phylloxera, trichina and the locust plague.

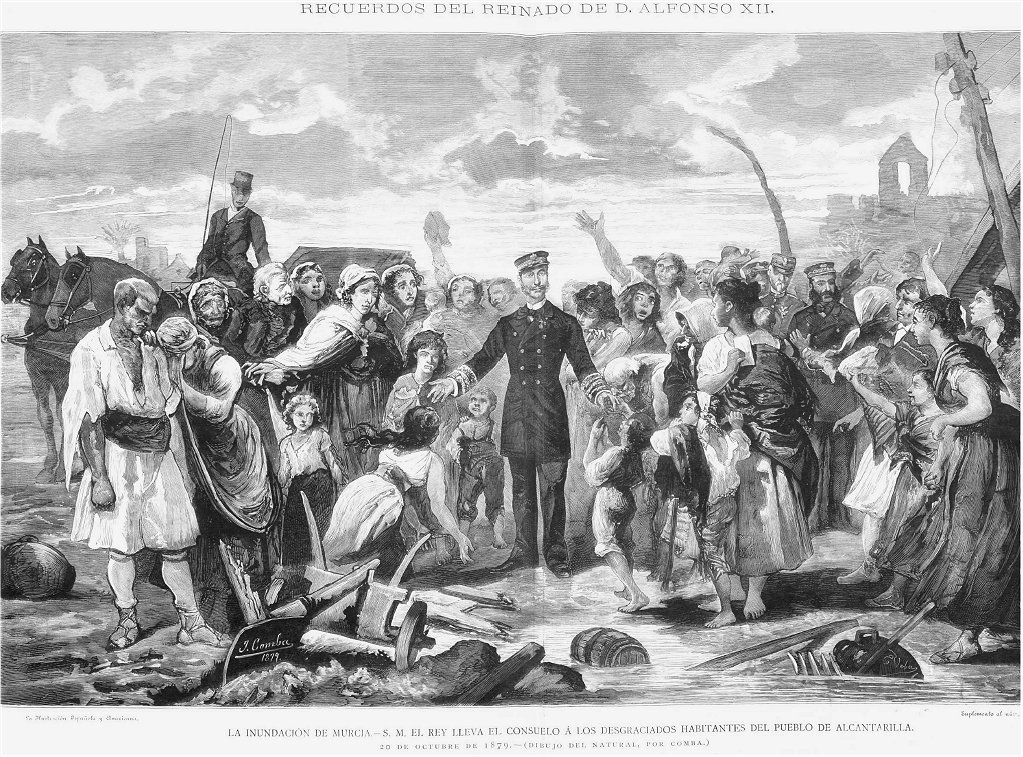
Engraving by Juan Comba on the visit of Alfonso XII to the Murcian town of Alcantarilla on the occasion of the terrible floods known as the Santa Teresa flood.

Martínez Campos's position was further weakened by the outbreak of the Guerra Chiquita in August 1879, a renewed rebellion in Cuba that would last until late 1880, and by devastating floods in October in Almería, Alicante and Murcia—later known as the Santa Teresa flood. King Alfonso XII’s personal visit to the affected areas earned him public admiration.

After the royal wedding, internal divisions emerged within the government over a proposed tax and tariff reform for Cuba and the slavery abolition bill. Martínez Campos resigned on December 9. Attempts to find an alternative—such as appointing Posada Herrera or Adelardo López de Ayala—failed, and Alfonso XII recalled Cánovas to lead the government.

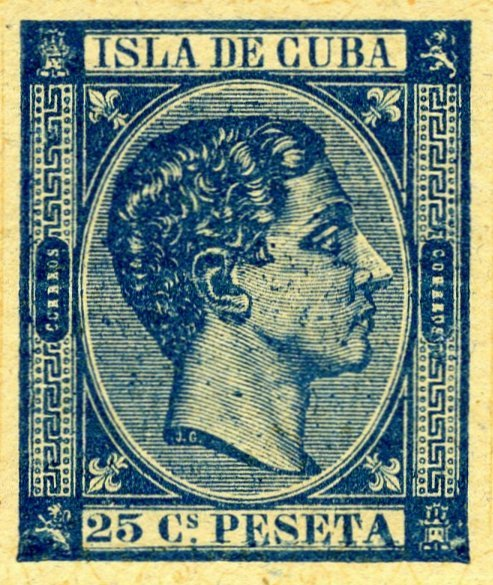
Postal stamp of the island of Cuba with the effigy of King Alfonso XII (1878).

To restore party unity, Cánovas adopted the abolition bill, reportedly with the king’s support. Although he introduced modifications favorable to slaveholders—including the retention of corporal punishment, opposed by Sagasta’s constitutionalists—the law was passed in February 1880. The final regulations imposed stricter controls, such as the use of stocks and shackles for “sponsored” slaves who refused to work or left plantations without permission. The Constitutional Union accepted the modified patronato system in August 1880.

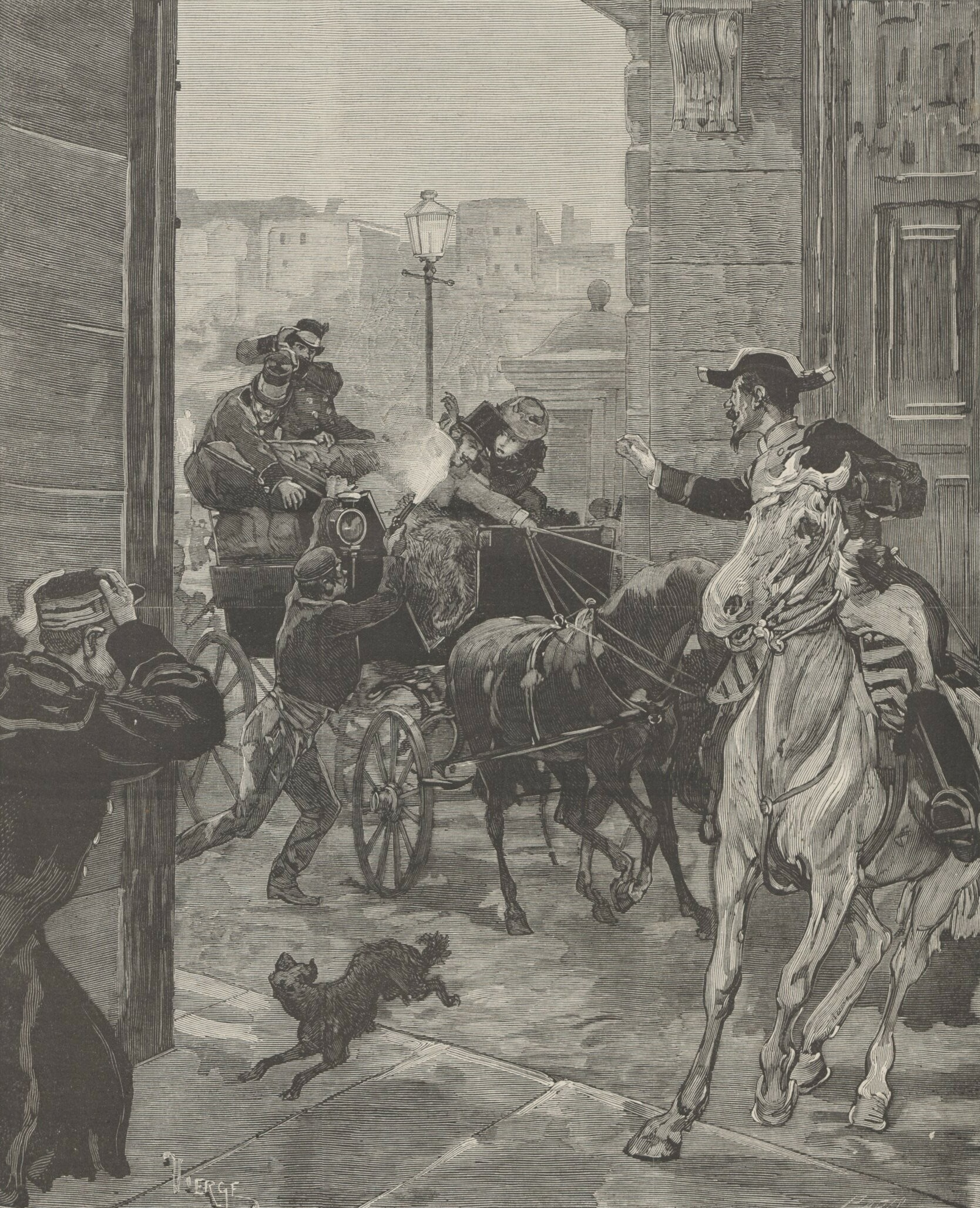
Engraving of Le Monde Illustré that reconstructs the failed attempt against Alfonso XII and his wife the queen María Cristina perpetrated in Madrid on December 30, 1879.

Martínez Campos’s removal led to a rift within the Conservative Party. Many of his supporters, particularly military allies, moved closer to Sagasta’s Constitutionalists, laying the groundwork for the Liberal-Fusionist Party—one of the two pillars of the Restoration regime. On June 11, 1880, Cánovas and Martínez Campos clashed in a Senate debate. Martínez Campos emphasized the importance of the Sagunto pronunciamiento in restoring the monarchy, while Cánovas dismissed it, arguing that larger political and military forces were decisive.

On December 30, 1879, King Alfonso XII and Queen Maria Christina survived a second assassination attempt. The attacker, Francisco Otero González, fired two shots but missed. Shortly afterward, it was announced that the queen was pregnant. Their daughter was born on September 11, 1880.

== First liberal government of Sagasta (1881-1883) ==
=== Arrival of the liberals to power ===
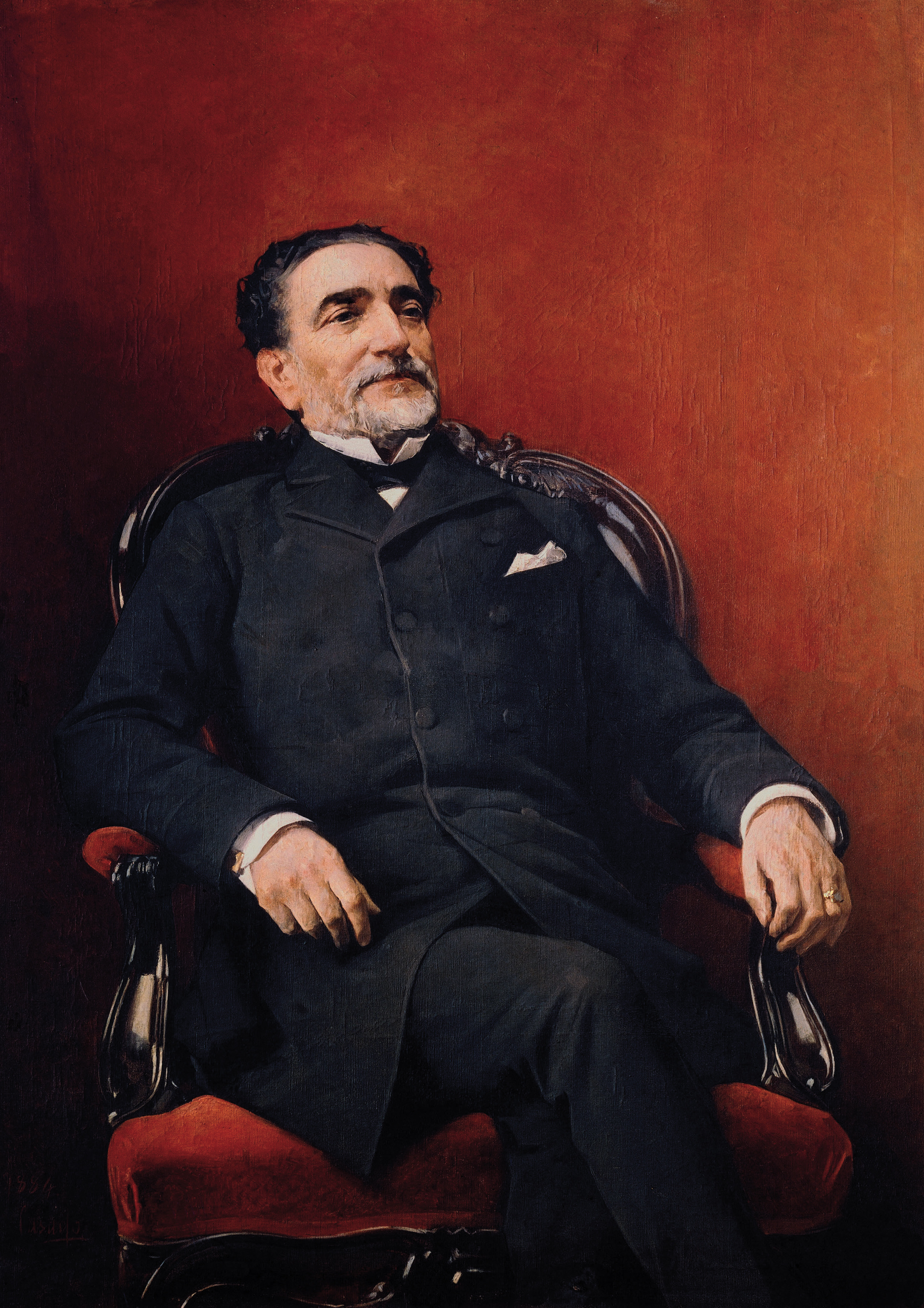
Portrait of the liberal leader Práxedes Mateo Sagasta by José Casado del Alisal (1884).

Unlike the Conservative Party, which by 1876 was largely consolidated under the leadership of Antonio Cánovas del Castillo— though through a difficult and contentious process— the Liberal Party did not take definitive shape until the spring of 1880. At that time, most members of the former Constitutional Party of the Sexenio, following the lead of the "centralists" around Manuel Alonso Martínez,abandoned their support for the 1869 Constitution and severed ties with republican leaders Manuel Ruiz Zorrilla and Emilio Castelar. Práxedes Mateo Sagasta, the Constitutionalists’ leader, was a pragmatic figure similar to Cánovas, believing that "in politics, one cannot always do what one wants, nor is it always convenient to do what is most just".

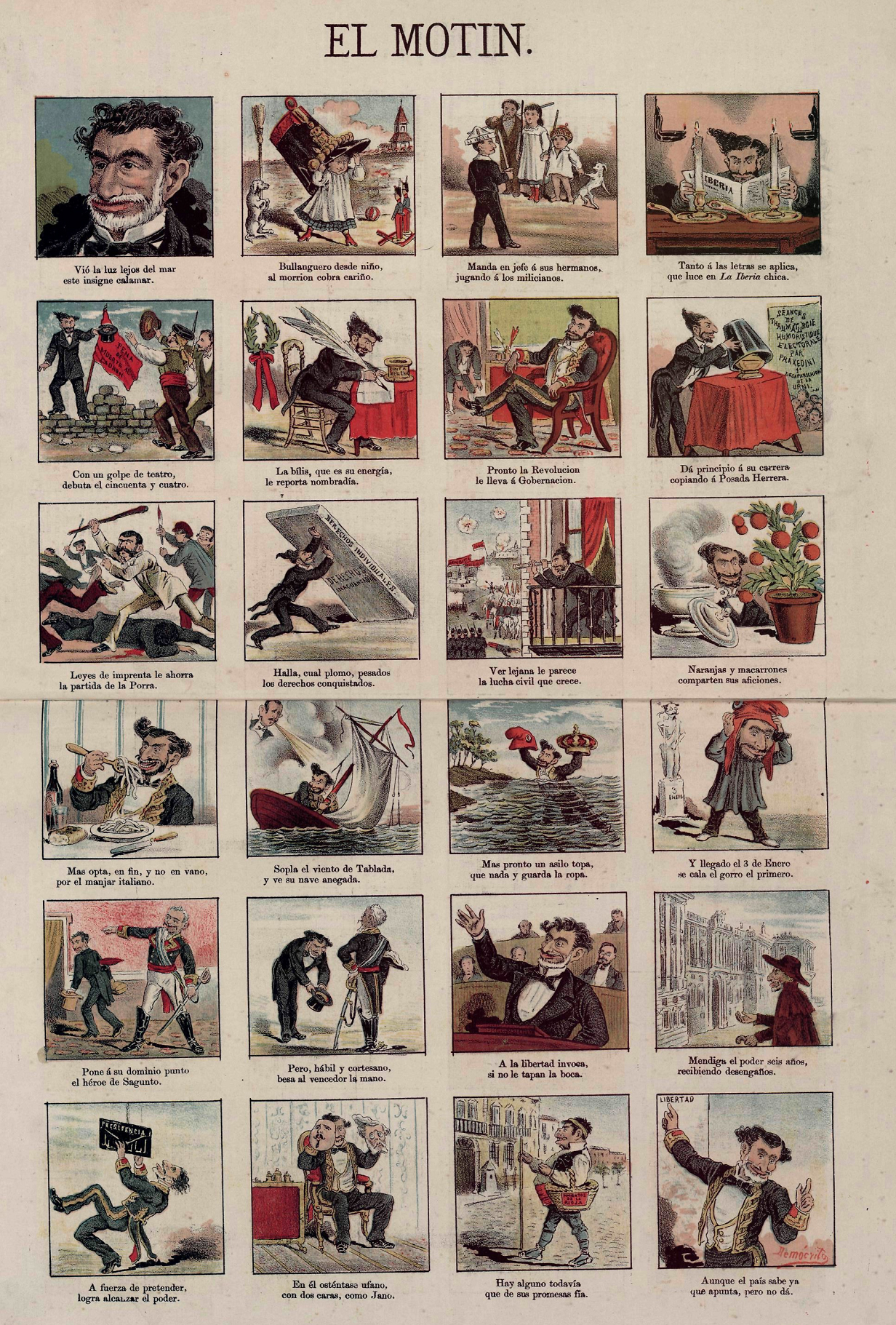
A satirical auca on Sagasta's political career published by El Motín on April 24, 1881, two months after his accession to power.

This shift in strategy culminated in the fusion of Sagasta's faction with the dissident conservatives led by General Martínez Campos, who had broken with Cánovas after his brief premiership, as well as the centralists. The result was the creation, in May 1880, of the Liberal-Fusionist Party under Sagasta's leadership. King Alfonso XII played a behind-the-scenes role in the party's formation. According to historian Feliciano Montero, the new party was ideologically diverse and lacked cohesion—an observation echoed by Cánovas and his allies, who were reluctant to relinquish power. Cánovas had previously admitted to the British ambassador that he intended to remain in office as long as possible because, in his view, the liberal opposition was too fragmented to govern effectively.

Sagasta publicly presented the Liberal-Fusionist Party before the Cortes on June 14, 1880, declaring its support for the 1876 Constitution—an essential condition for political legitimacy within the Restoration system. He described the party as committed to the most liberal interpretation of the constitutional framework.

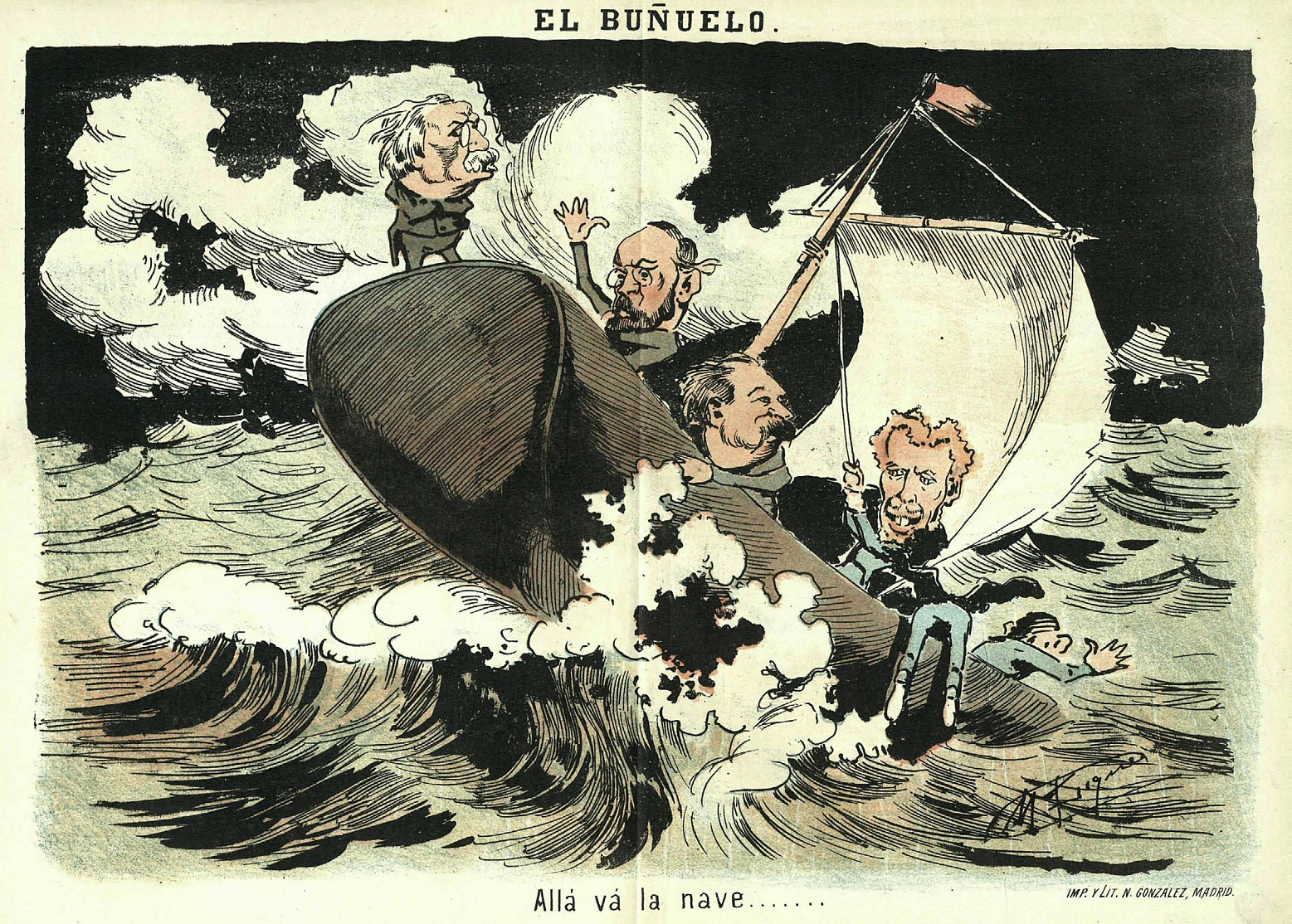
Caricature showing the resistance of the conservatives to abandon power. The caption reads: "There goes the ship...". In the prow, the president of the government Cánovas, and in the stern, holding the sail, the Minister of the Interior Francisco Romero Robledo. Satirical magazine El Buñuelo, January 13, 1881.

In the same session, deputy Fernando León y Castillo criticized the concentration of power in Cánovas’s hands, accusing him of dominating the Interior Ministry, controlling elections and Parliament, and thereby securing his continued leadership through a self-reinforcing cycle of political dominance.

From its inception, the Liberal-Fusionist Party pressed Alfonso XII to hand over power, warning of possible revolutionary consequences. Historian Carlos Seco Serrano noted that the Conservatives had already governed for five years since the Restoration and that the king was reluctant to dissolve the recently elected Cortes—a step that would have been required had Sagasta been appointed. According to José Varela Ortega, a June 1880 meeting between the king and fusionist leaders ended with the monarch assuring them he would call them to govern once they had formed a viable alternative to the Conservatives. On January 19, 1881, amid a heated parliamentary debate, Sagasta invoked the royal prerogative to demand his right to govern. He warned that without liberal participation, the Restoration regime would lack legitimacy, hinting at potential unrest if their claim to power continued to be denied:

If my efforts and my sacrifices were sterile because of your obstinacy and your tenacity, I will see it with a sorrowful soul, but with a clear conscience; because whatever the vicissitudes, whatever the destiny we all have prepared, as I must always fall on the side of freedom, I will then say with my forehead raised: I am where I was; neither then did I obey the inspirations of patriotism, nor today do I yield to the impulses of duty and the feelings of the heart.

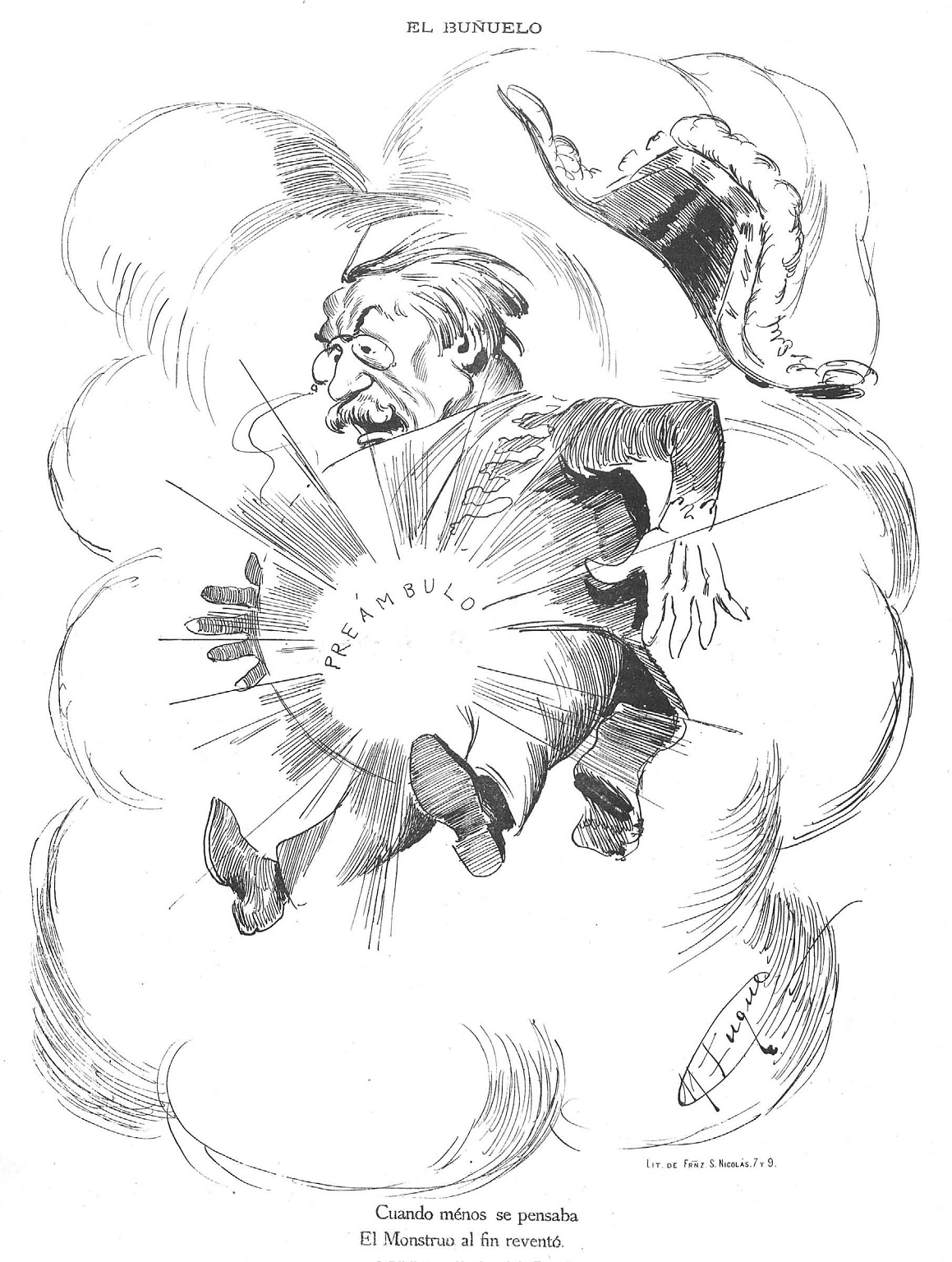
Caricature representing the fall of Cánovas after the king refused to sign the decree that he had presented to him for signature because of its preamble (word that appears in the center of the explosion). The caption of the image reads: "Cuando menos se pensaba / El Monstruo al fin reventó" (When least thought / The Monster finally burst). Satirical magazine El Buñuelo, February 10, 1881.

Shortly after receiving party leaders at the Palace on his birthday (January 23), King Alfonso XII forced Cánovas’s resignation on February 6, 1881, after the latter refused to sign a decree. The king then entrusted the formation of a government to Práxedes Mateo Sagasta. On February 8, the first Liberal cabinet of the Restoration was sworn in. According to Carlos Seco Serrano, Cánovas had provoked the crisis by including in a debt conversion decree a justification that implied the need to extend his government’s mandate. However, historians such as Carlos Dardé and Ángeles Lario argue that the crisis was initiated by the king himself, who had lost confidence in Cánovas and used the decree as a constitutional mechanism to trigger his resignation. José Ramón Milán García also points to Alfonso XII’s initiative, noting that the monarch recognized a shift in the liberal opposition: it had distanced itself from revolutionary positions and incorporated loyal dynastic elements. José Varela Ortega supports this view, highlighting the internal divisions among conservatives and the threat of a liberal-republican alliance.

Conservatives emphasized that the Liberals came to power not through a parliamentary victory, but by royal decision. The conservative newspaper La Época wrote that the Liberal-Fusionist Party owed its rise to "the free initiative and will of the King." Conservative leader Romero Robledo acknowledged the loss of power: “We had a majority in the Chambers [...], but a higher wisdom [...] believes that the time has come to change policy". As Dardé noted, the February 1881 crisis confirmed that ultimate political authority rested with the monarch.

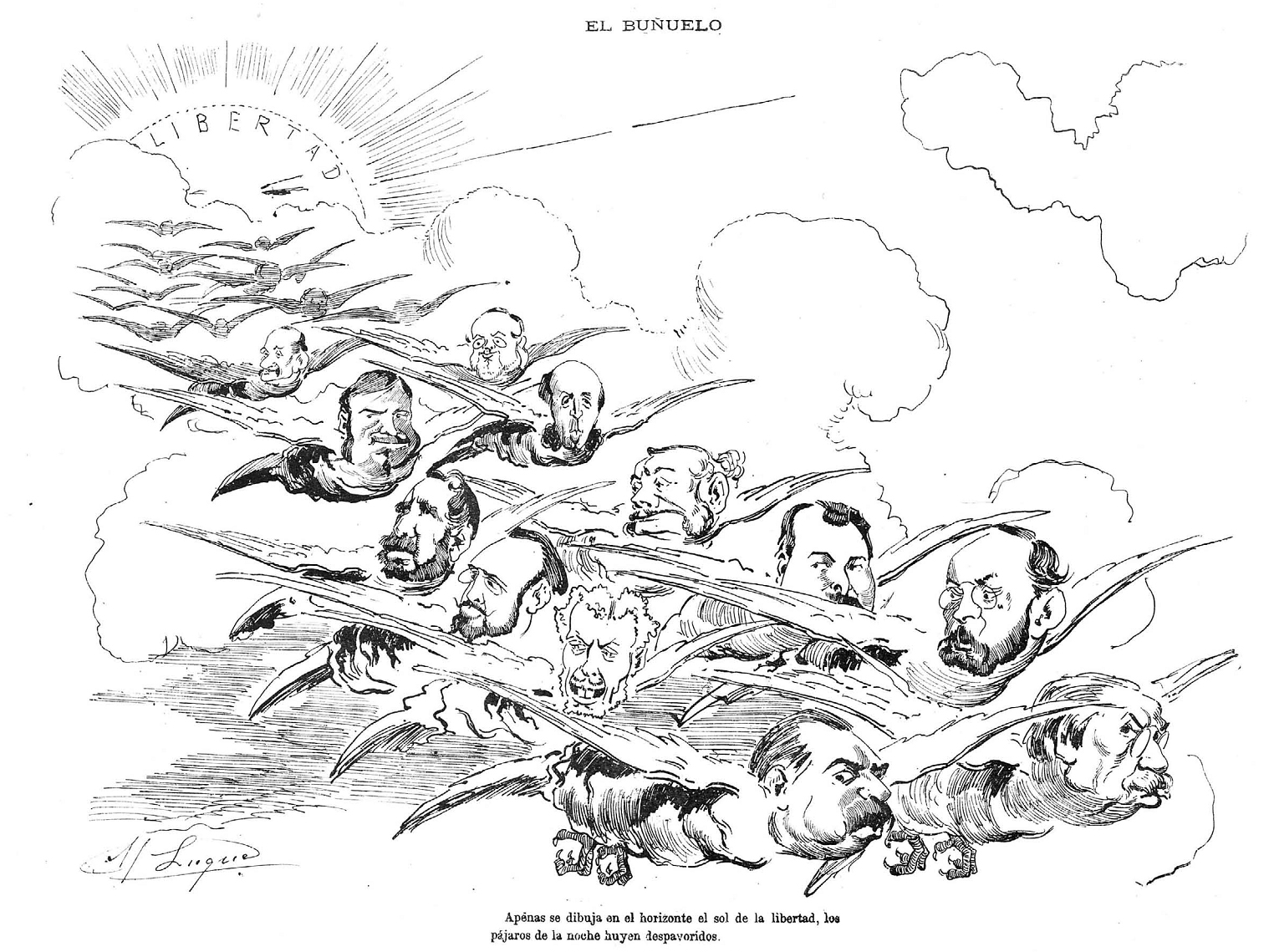
Caricature celebrating the Conservative Party's abandonment of power, with Cánovas at the head followed by his ministers (the birds of the night). The caption reads: "As soon as the sun of freedom is drawn on the horizon, the birds of the night flee in terror". Satirical magazine El Buñuelo, February 17, 1881.

The entry of the Liberals into government caused unease among conservative sectors, given the revolutionary past of some leaders, including Sagasta. Nevertheless, their accession marked the beginning of the alternation of power—or turno pacífico—between the Conservatives and Liberals, a defining feature of the Restoration system. According to Feliciano Montero, it ended political exclusivism and signaled the regime’s consolidation. Manuel Suárez Cortina emphasized the break from five years of Canovist dominance, while noting that many conservative elites still viewed Sagasta's faction with suspicion. Carlos Dardé observed that the traditional resistance to progressive governance had now dissipated.

As José Ramón Milán García summarized, the Liberals’ arrival in power was a key moment in Alfonso XII’s reign. It marked a significant step in overcoming the longstanding division between left-wing liberalism and the Bourbon monarchy, and a move toward reconciling the fragmented currents of Spanish liberalism.

=== First stage of Sagasta's government (1881-1882) ===
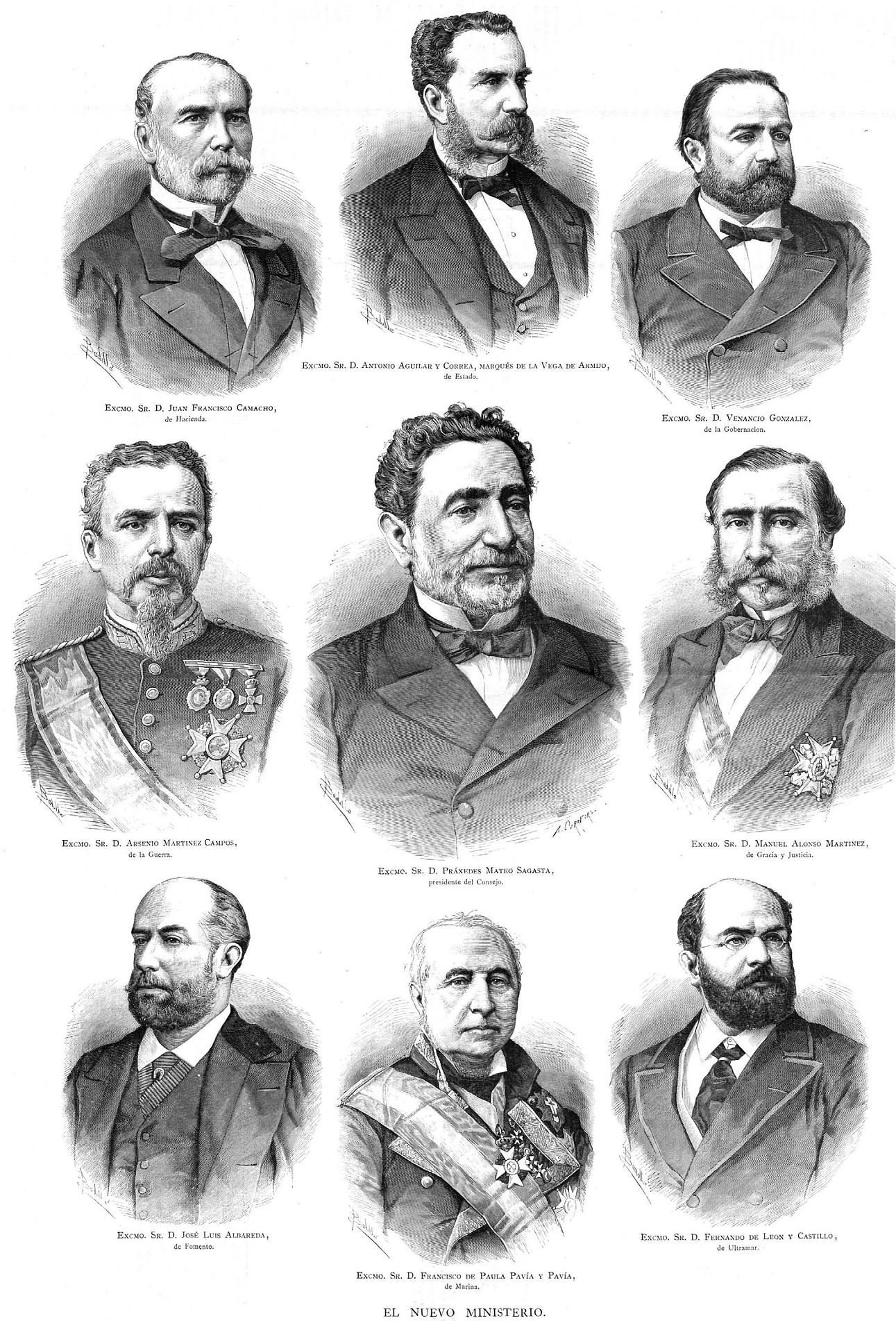
The government of Sagasta (in the center). On his right General Arsenio Martínez Campos (War) and on his left Manuel Alonso Martínez (Grace and Justice). Above: Juan Francisco Camacho (Treasury); the Marquis de la Vega de Armijo (State); and Venancio González (Interior). Below: José Luis Albareda (Development); Francisco de Paula Pavía y Pavía (Navy); and Fernando León y Castillo (Overseas).

1881, reflected the diverse composition of the Liberal-Fusionist Party. It included representatives of the constitutionalists, the centralists led by Manuel Alonso Martínez, and the group of former conservatives aligned with General Martínez Campos. José Posada Herrera, also from the conservative camp, became president of the Congress of Deputies. Within the party, the constitutionalists represented the left and upheld the principle of national sovereignty, while the centralists and campistas formed the right wing, advocating for "shared sovereignty". These internal differences soon became evident, particularly in disputes over the distribution of administrative posts and positions in municipal and general elections.

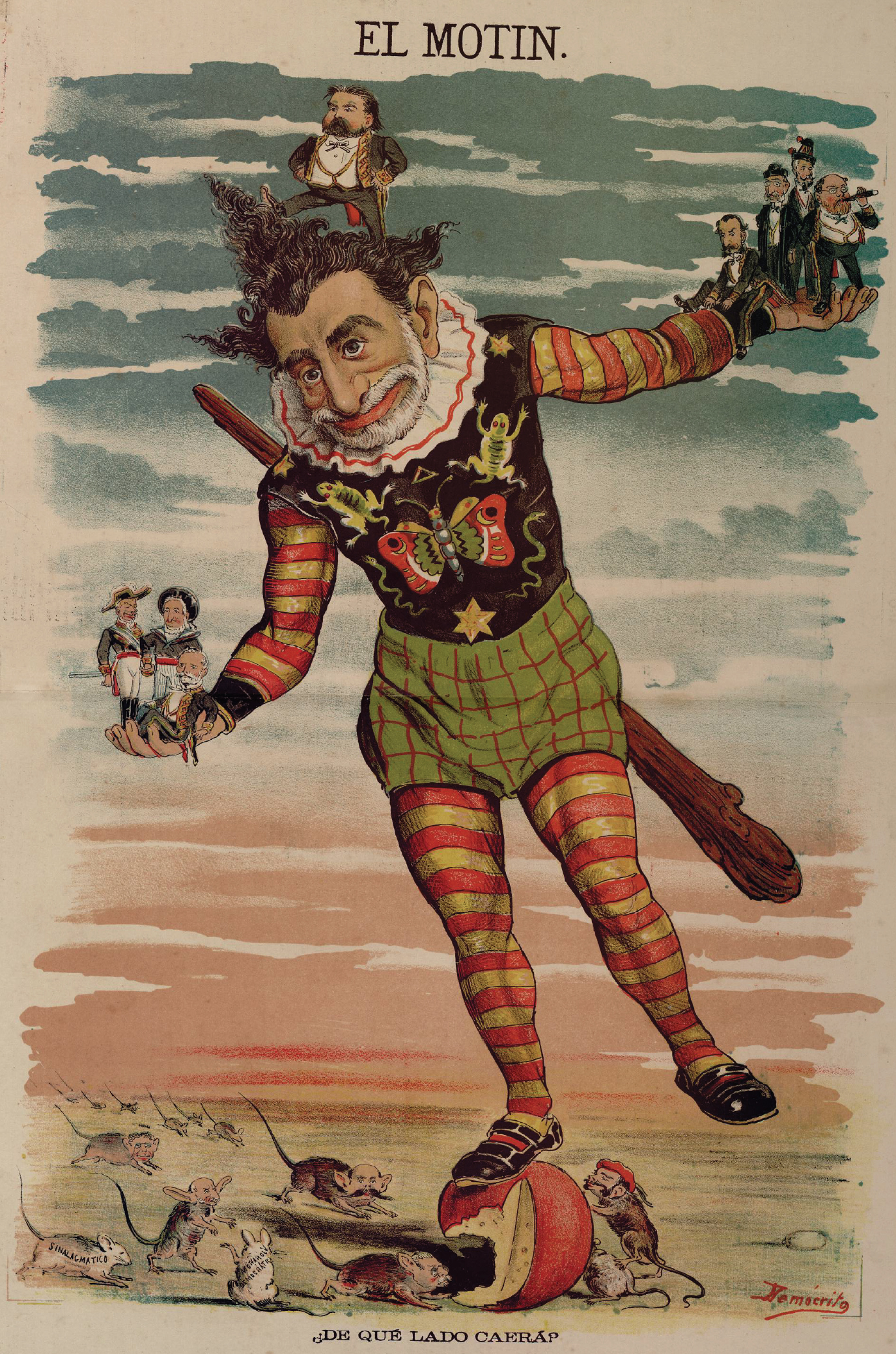
Caricature from El Motín (August 21, 1881) entitled "On which side will he fall?" showing Sagasta balancing between the right-wing and left-wing factions of his government, while the mice (conservatives, Carlists, democrats, republicans...) gnaw at the cheese on which he stands to make it fall.

Sagasta had to balance these factions while managing the party’s extensive clientelist networks, typical of 19th-century Spanish politics. As Feliciano Montero noted, these networks relied less on ideology than on the ability to grant favors through discretionary and often fraudulent use of administrative power. Sagasta understood that maintaining party unity was crucial—both for preserving his leadership and because the king’s support was contingent upon it.

The government’s early actions signaled a shift toward greater public freedoms, reviving many liberal principles from the Revolution of 1868 and reversing aspects of the Restoration that had been seen as reactionary. Public demonstrations and political banquets were authorized for the anniversary of the 1873 Republic, and a royal decree lifted the suspension of several newspapers, dismissed pending cases, and announced a forthcoming press law. A circular from Justice Minister Manuel Alonso Martínez ended prior censorship of political issues, and another from Public Works Minister José Luis Albareda repealed the 1875 Orovio Decree, allowing dismissed university professors such as Emilio Castelar, Eugenio Montero Ríos, Segismundo Moret, Nicolás Salmerón, Gumersindo de Azcárate, and Francisco Giner de los Ríos to return to their posts.

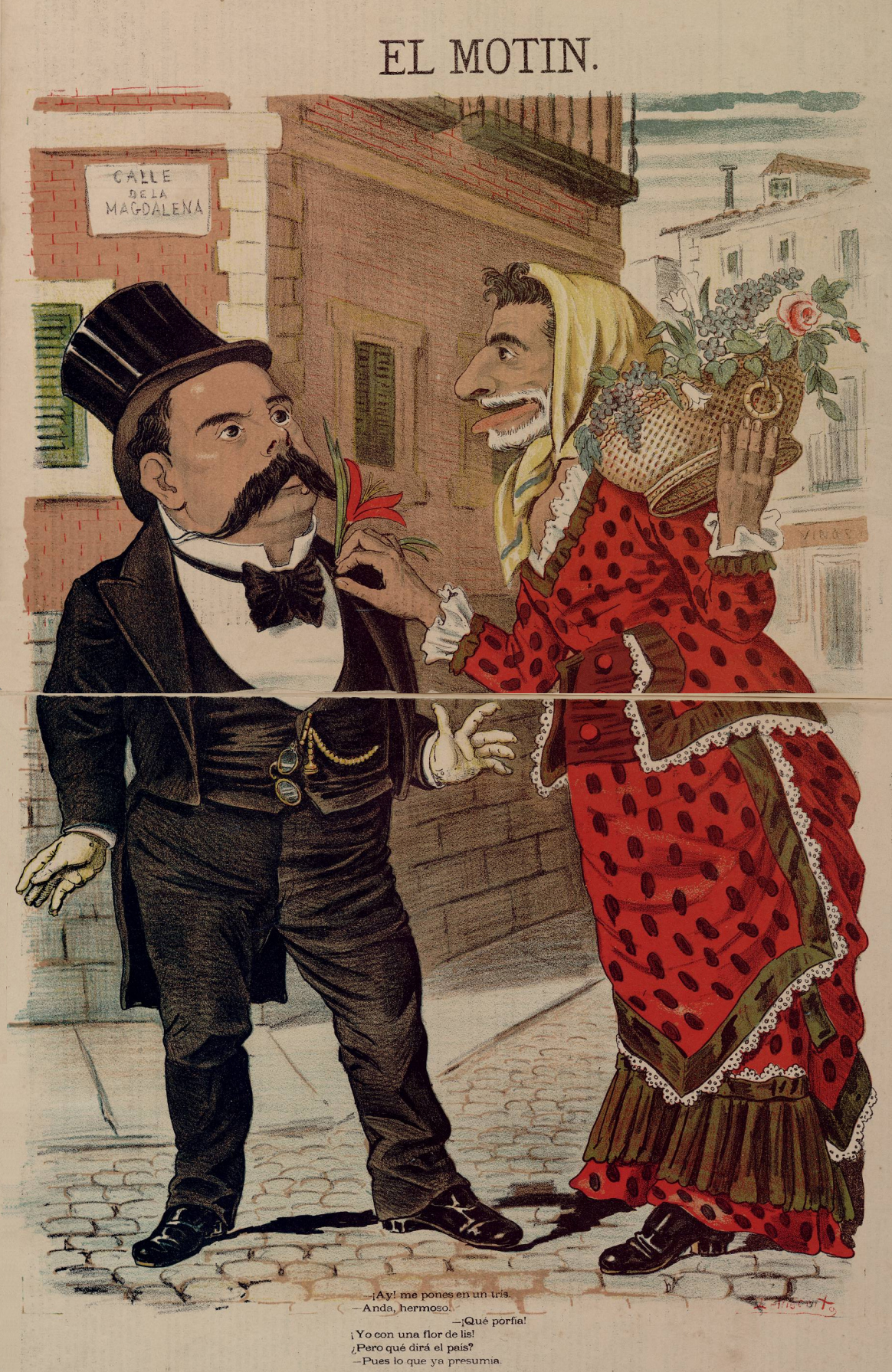
Caricature from El Motín published on September 4, 1881 with the title "¡Ay, me pones en un tris!". It shows Sagasta disguised as a street florist putting a fleur-de-lis, the symbol of the Bourbons, in the buttonhole of the jacket of the republican Emilio Castelar.

These liberalizations revitalized political life. Public demonstrations, republican and secular propaganda, and opposition discourse flourished under the new freedoms. Emilio Castelar praised the government for restoring liberty, ending press censorship, reopening universities to all schools of thought, and enabling democratic expression.

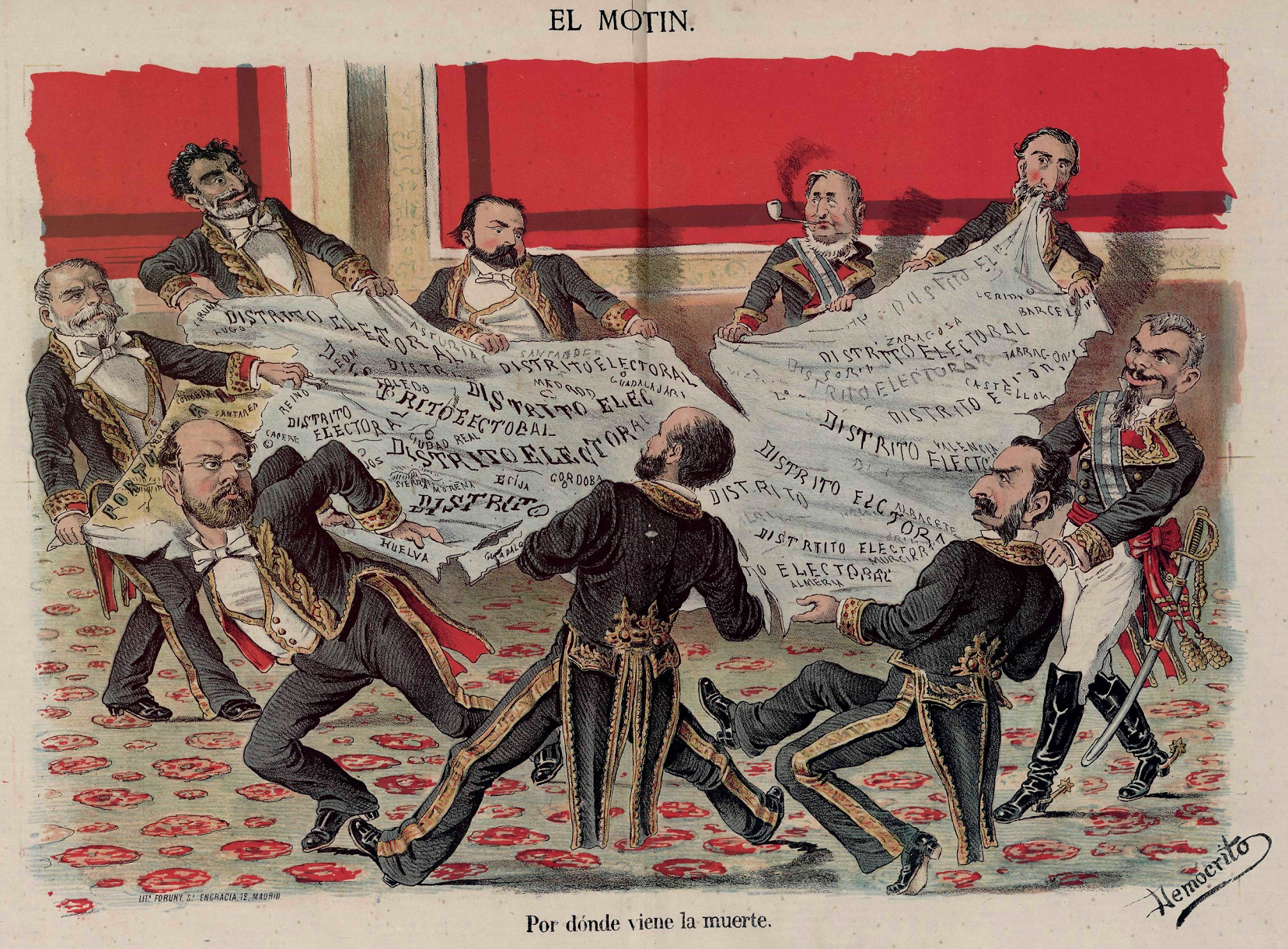
Caricature from El Motín entitled Por dónde viene la muerte. It represents the dispute between the members of Sagasta's government over the distribution of electoral districts. Following Sagasta (top left) and following clockwise: Venancio González, Francisco de Paula Pavía y Pavía, Manuel Alonso Martínez, Arsenio Martínez Campos, the Marquis de la Vega de Armijo, José Luis Albareda, Fernando León y Castillo and Juan Francisco Camacho.

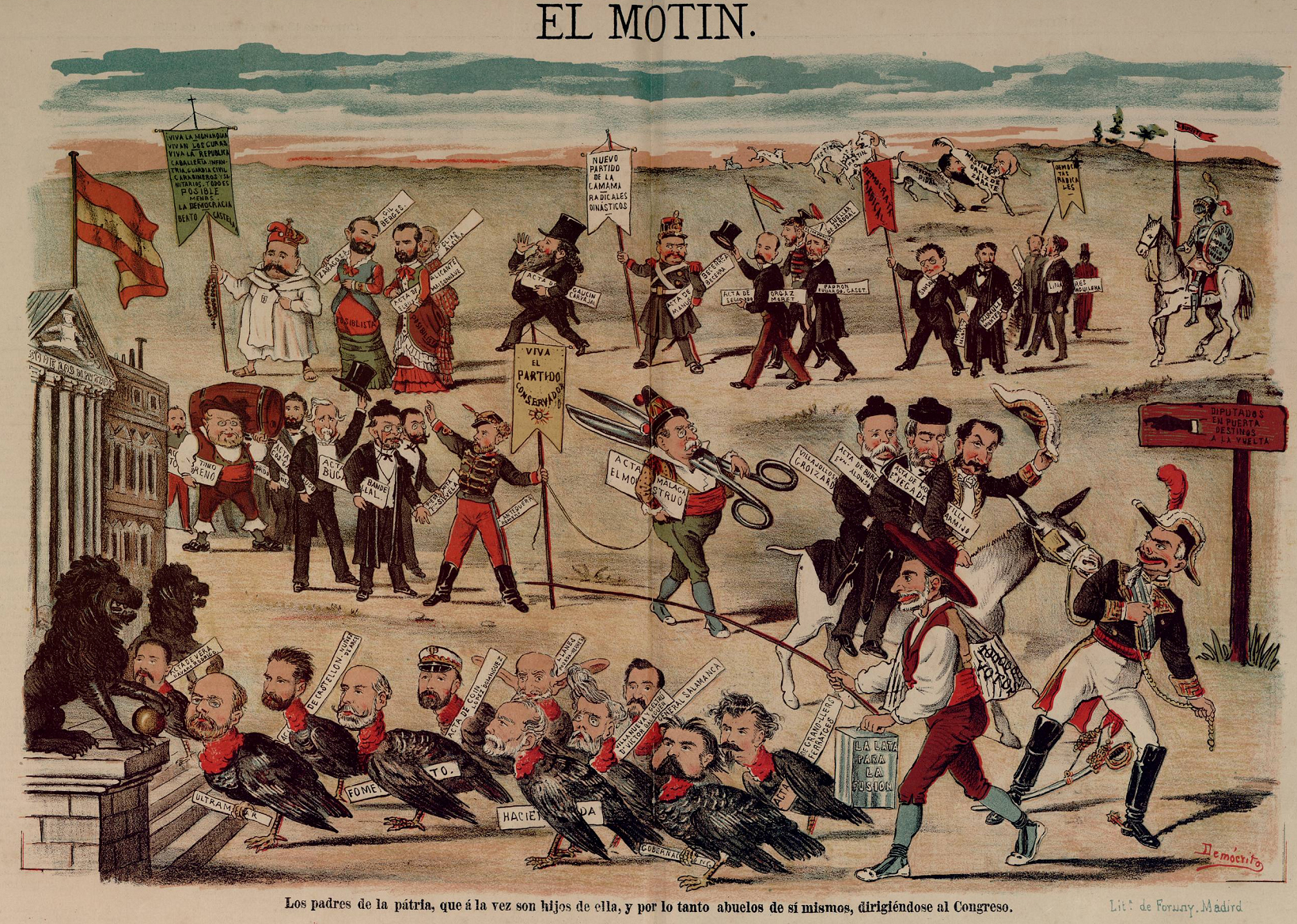
Caricature from El Motín entitled "The fathers of the motherland, who at the same time are sons of it, and therefore grandfathers of themselves, addressing the Congress". In the foreground Sagasta leading his turkeys, followed by General Martínez Campos leading the members of his faction mounted on a donkey. Next the conservatives with Cánovas at the front, followed by the republican possibilist Emilio Castelar and the radicals, among them Segismundo Moret.

The 1881 general elections, managed by Interior Minister Venancio González, resulted in a sweeping victory for the Liberal-Fusionist Party. In candidate selection, Sagasta favored centralists and former conservatives over constitutionalists to strengthen party cohesion. This centrist, pragmatic line also shaped his legislative agenda, aimed at showing that liberal parties could govern stably and responsibly. Sagasta emphasized gradual reform to ensure longevity similar to that of the Conservatives.

In legislative terms, the government introduced a provincial law that significantly broadened suffrage—approaching universal male suffrage. However, other proposed laws on local governance, associations, trial by jury, and administrative justice were not debated. Economically, a major initiative was the 1882 trade treaty with France, which aimed to open the French market to Spanish wine in exchange for tariff reductions on French industrial goods—a move opposed by protectionists, particularly in Catalonia, Finance Minister Juan Francisco Camacho de Alcorta implemented a successful public debt conversion, easing the budgetary burden and restoring Spain’s international credit. Nevertheless, tax reform was limited, with the regressive consumption tax remaining dominant.

In judicial reforms, the most notable achievement was the 1882 Criminal Procedure Law, which established public and oral trials, advancing transparency and legal modernization. However, attempts to codify civil law were stalled by conflicts with the Vatican over marriage laws and by the complexities of regional legal traditions, particularly Catalan and other foral systems. In education, Minister Albareda sought to strengthen public primary education, though religious orders continued to dominate the sector. He collaborated with figures from the Institución Libre de Enseñanza (ILE), founding the Pedagogical Museum in 1882 under their influence. ILE-affiliated figures also assumed key roles in the education ministry. Albareda promoted popular libraries and free night schools for workers, stating that these institutions enabled the working class to "enlighten themselves and improve their social position".

=== Second stage of Sagasta's government (January–October 1883) ===
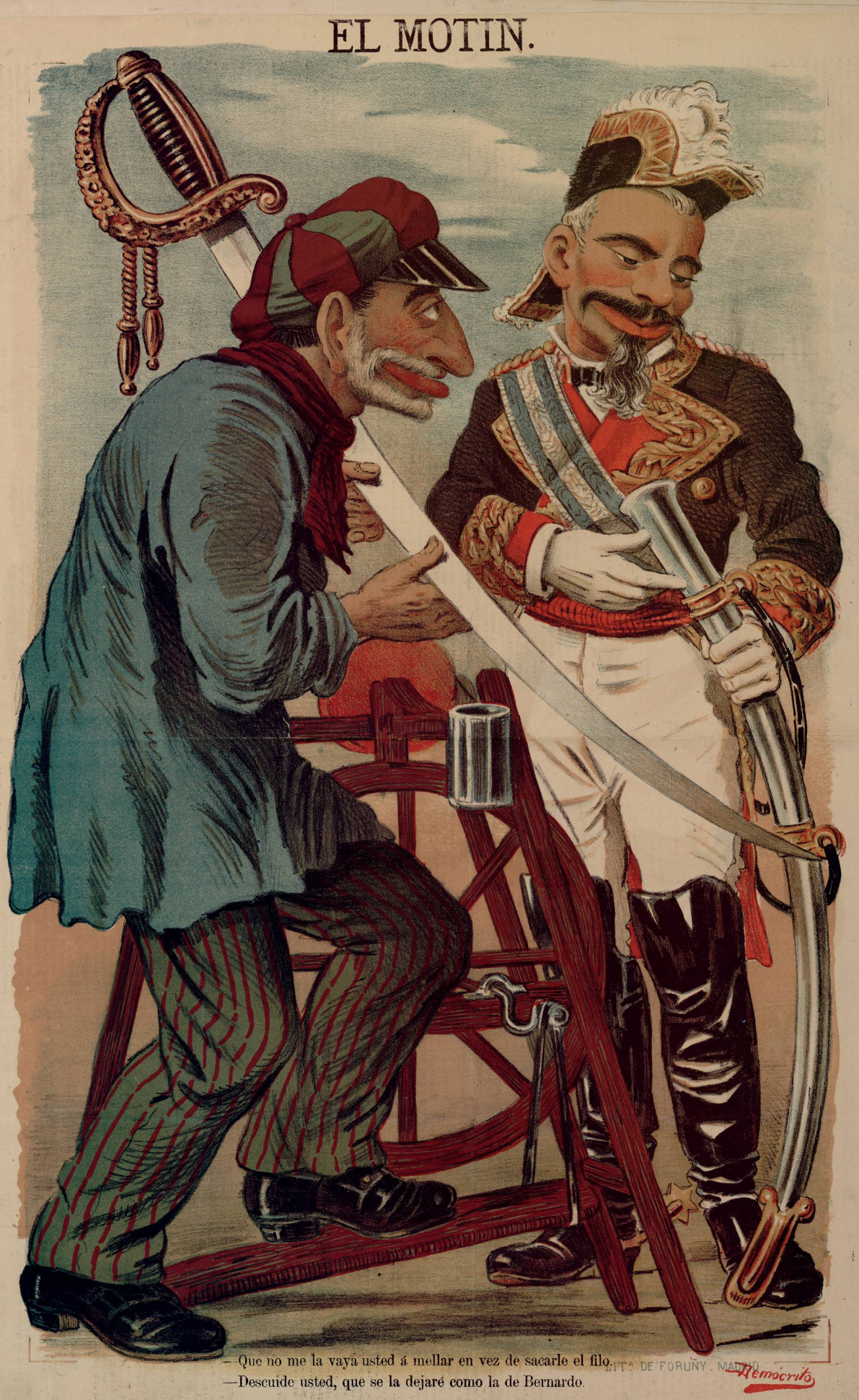
Caricature from El Motín depicting Sagasta (left, dressed as a sharpie) and Martínez Campos (right, in his general's uniform). The caption reads: "—Don't let me nick it instead of sharpening it. —Don't worry, I will leave it like Bernardo's".

In January 1883, Prime Minister Práxedes Mateo Sagasta undertook a significant reshuffle of his government, which had begun to suffer under the competing pressures of the various political factions that made up the Liberal-Fusionist Party. One of the most influential of these factions was the right-wing group led by Carlos Navarro Rodrigo, known as the tercios navarros, which sought to replace Sagasta as party leader. Sagasta seized the opportunity to reassert his authority amid a cabinet dispute between Finance Minister Juan Camacho and Public Works Minister José Luis Albareda. The conflict arose over Camacho’s proposal to sell public mountains and pastures to raise revenue—a plan Albareda opposed for its detrimental effects on agricultural development. Both ministers resigned and were replaced by Justo Pelayo de la Cuesta Núñez and Germán Gamazo, the latter aligned with Navarro Rodrigo. This move was a calculated gesture to draw Navarro Rodrigo’s faction closer and secure his acceptance of Sagasta’s continued leadership.

Historians such as José Varela Ortega interpret this cabinet shake-up as a response to the recent emergence of the Izquierda Dinástica, a new party aimed at destabilizing the liberal coalition and bringing down Sagasta's government. As part of his strategy, Sagasta ousted key right-wing figures such as Manuel Alonso Martínez, replacing him with Vicente Romero Girón, a former member of the Dynastic Left whom Sagasta had successfully recruited. Despite these efforts, Sagasta failed to fully sideline the party's right wing due to resistance from the campistas and centralists. Notably, General Martínez Campos refused to vacate the War Ministry, and insisted that the Marquis de la Vega de Armijo remain at Foreign Affairs. Sagasta, facing intra-party pressure, conceded to their demands, forming a government that remained divided and unstable—lasting only ten months.

The government’s principal legislative success was the Printing Police Law of July 26, 1883—known as the Gullón Law after Interior Minister Pío Gullón Iglesias. This landmark law ended prior censorship, returned press offenses to common courts, and made newspaper directors—not owners—legally responsible for published content, offering greater protections to publishers and press freedom. It effectively repealed the restrictive 1879 law passed under Cánovas and remained in force for decades.

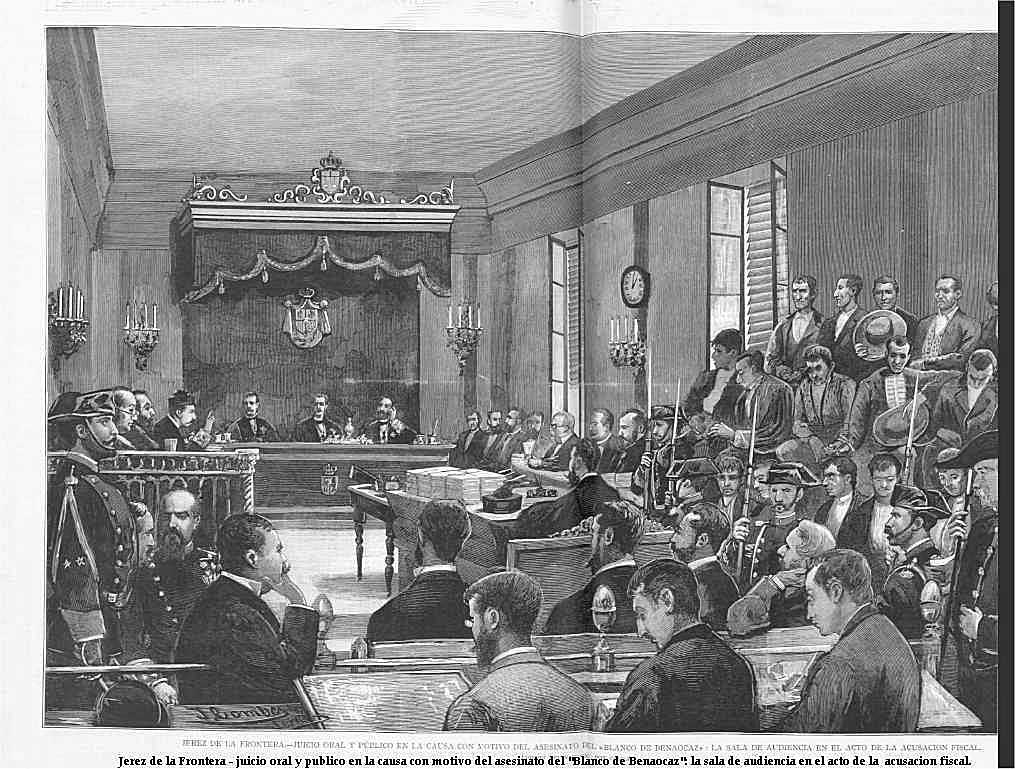
Trial against the alleged members of La Mano Negra held in Jerez de la Frontera (La Ilustración Española y Americana, June 30, 1883).

Nevertheless, the government soon faced three major crises that led to its downfall:

- The La Mano Negra Trial (May–June 1883): In Jerez de la Frontera, eight anarchists were sentenced to death and seven to hard labor, accused of belonging to the alleged secret anarchist society La Mano Negra. Although linked by authorities to the Federación de Trabajadores de la Región Española (FTRE), the FTRE denied any connection. The trial unfolded amid severe social unrest in Andalusia and was used by conservatives to justify repression and to question the government's capacity to maintain order;
- Republican Uprisings (August 1883): A series of failed pronunciamientos—in Badajoz, Santo Domingo de la Calzada, and La Seo de Urgel—were organized by the clandestine Asociación Republicana Militar (ARM), funded by the exiled leader Manuel Ruiz Zorrilla from Paris. These uprisings lacked popular support and quickly collapsed. Under diplomatic pressure from Madrid, French authorities forced Ruiz Zorrilla to leave Paris for London.
- The Franco-German Diplomatic Incident (September 1883): During a state visit to Germany, King Alfonso XII donned the uniform of a German Uhlan regiment stationed in Alsace—an area annexed by Germany after the Franco-Prussian war. At a banquet, he offered an enthusiastic toast to Emperor Wilhelm I and the German army, even expressing Spain’s willingness to support Germany in a future war. This unprecedented diplomatic gesture, made without consulting the government, infuriated France and triggered public protests in Paris when the king passed through on his return. Only the personal apology of French President Jules Grévy prevented a full diplomatic rupture. In Madrid, Foreign Minister Marquis de la Vega de Armijo suggested severing ties with France, but Sagasta and the rest of the cabinet refused.

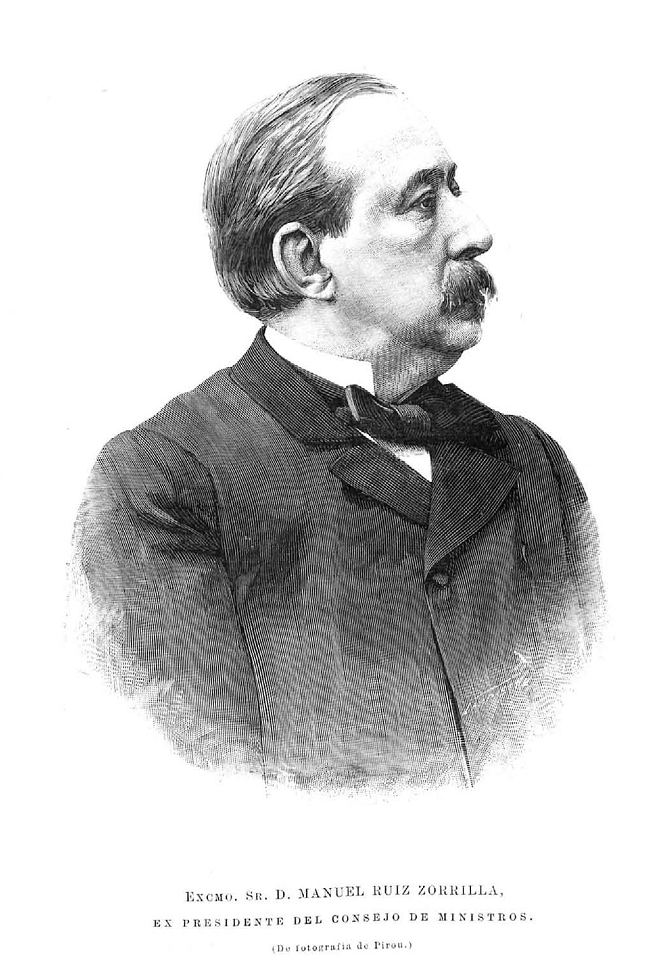
The exiled republican leader Manuel Ruiz Zorrilla. From Paris, he was the instigator of the 1883 pronunciamiento in Spain through the Asociación Republicana Militar, promoted and financed by him.

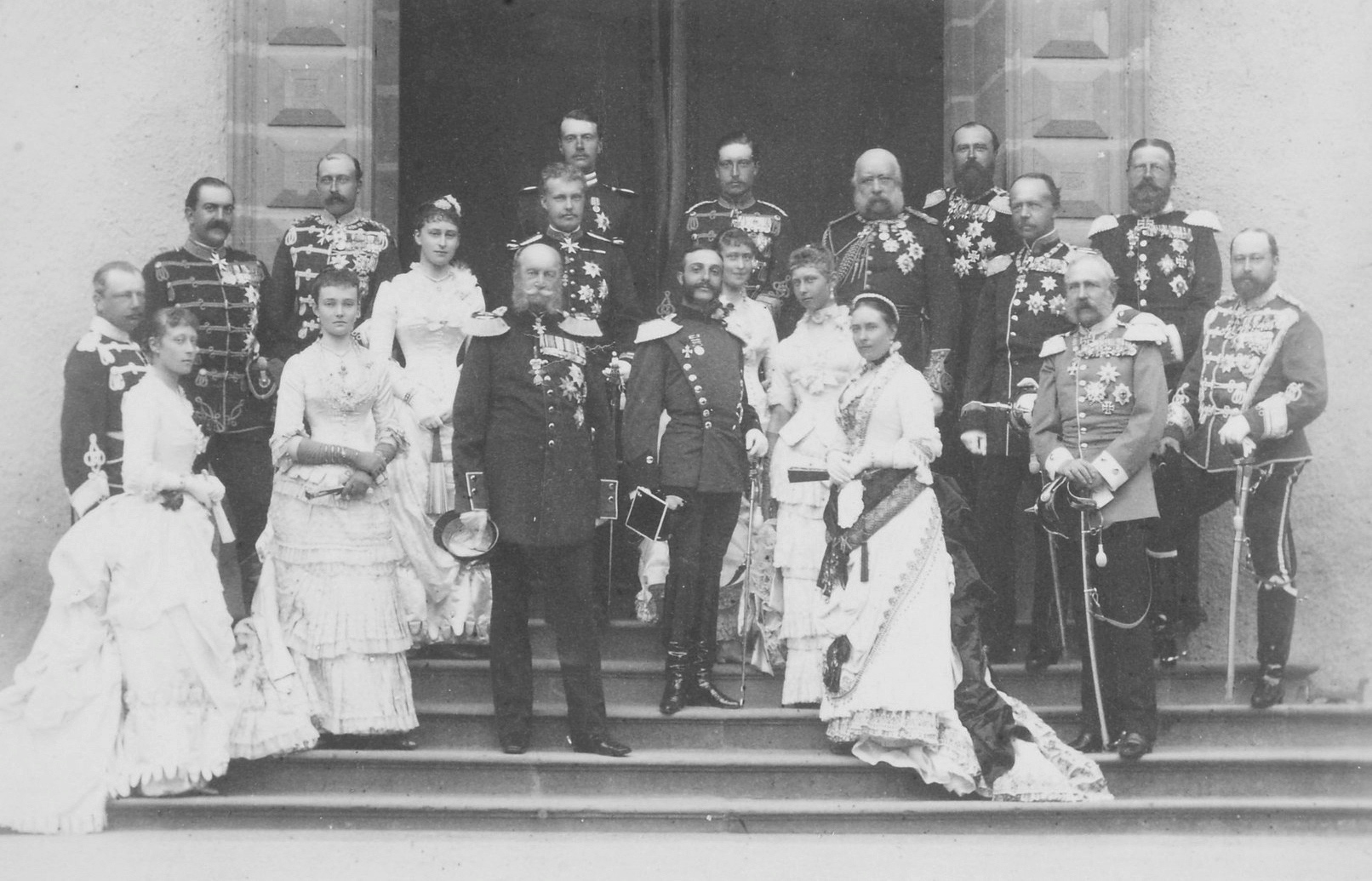
Meeting of the European kings and crown princes in the castle of Homburg invited by Kaiser Wilhelm I. In the center, King Alfonso XII wearing the uniform of colonel of the Hulans regiment stationed in Alsace (seized by Germany from France after its victory in the Franco-Prussian war of 1870) whose honorary command had been conferred on him by Wilhelm I (located on his right), which raised the protests of France.

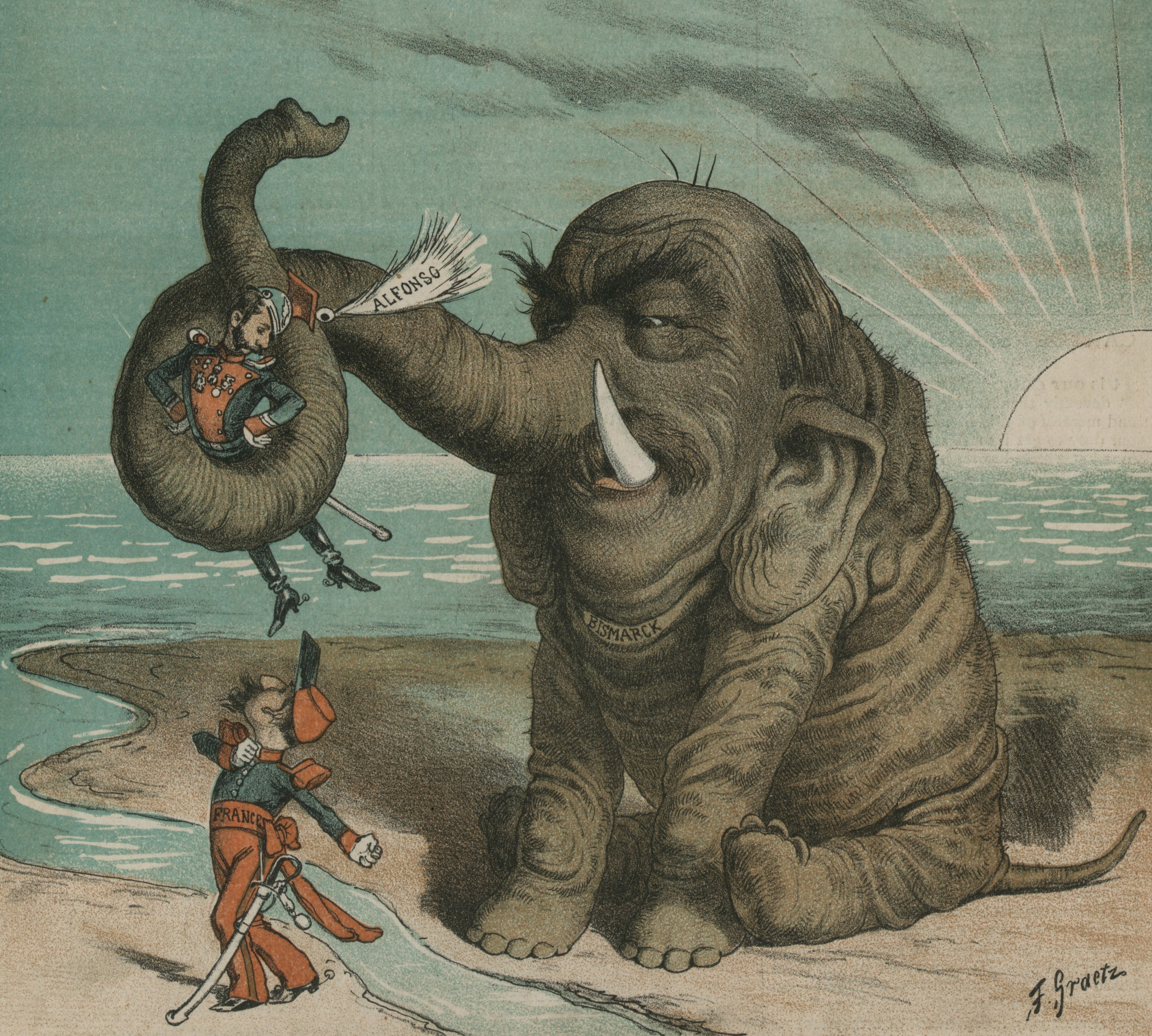
Caricature published on the cover of the American satirical magazine Puck on November 28, 1883. It is entitled The Impulse of Bismarck (who is depicted as an elephant with a huge trunk) and the caption reads, "The Hulano king: 'I am taller than you, now.'" The hulano king is Alfonso XII that appears dressed in the uniform of colonel of the regiment of hulanos assigned in Alsace and that from the trunk of the elephant (Bismarck) says boastfully to a French soldier the phrase of the foot of the image: "I am higher than you, now".

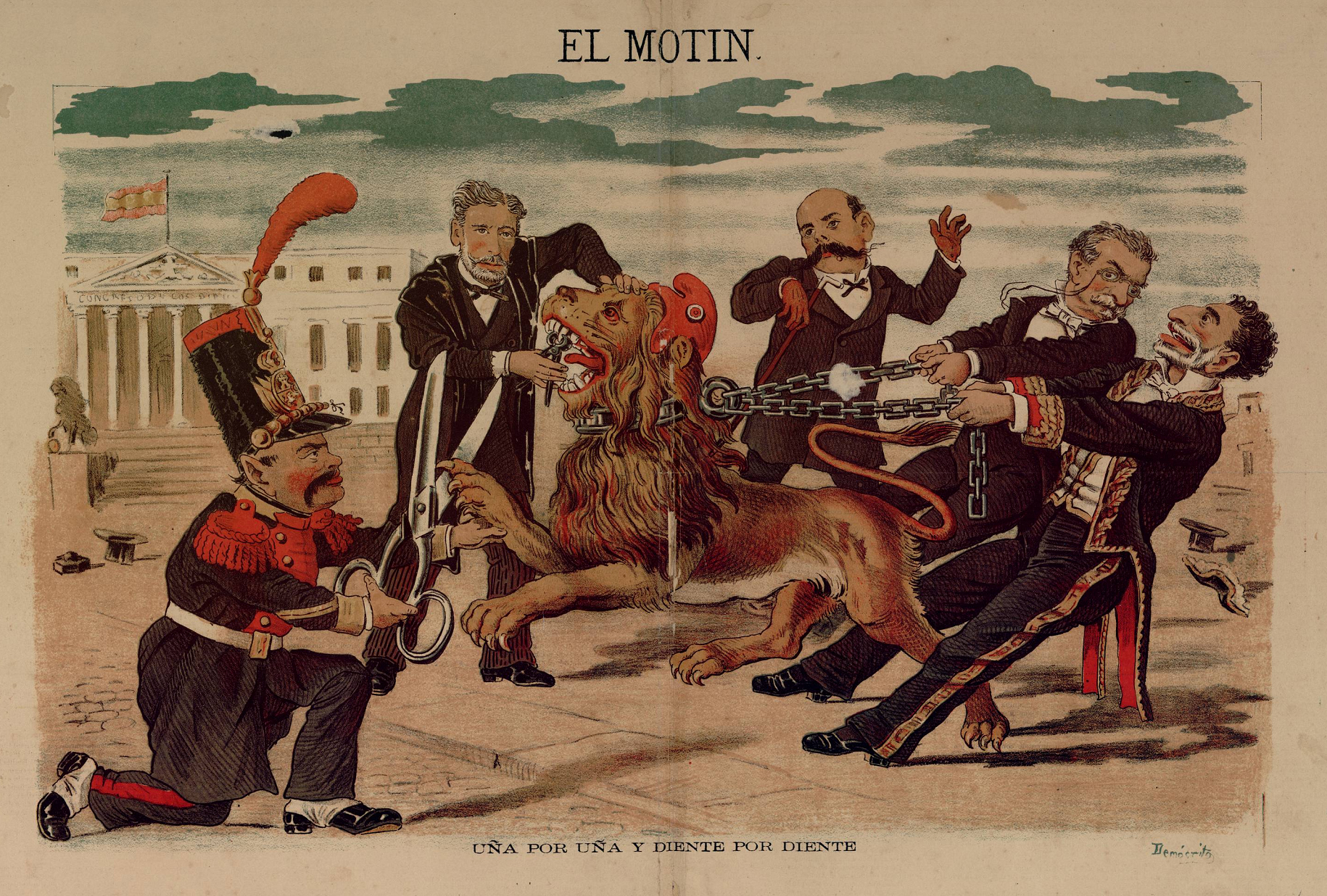
Caricature of El Motín (October 16, 1881) titled "Uña por uña y diente por diente" (Nail for nail and tooth for tooth). It shows Cánovas and Sagasta holding in chains the lion that represents the Republic, while a civilian (Eugenio Montero Ríos?) pulls out its teeth and a military man (General Manuel Becerra y Bermúdez?) cuts its claws. Emilio Castelar in the background seems to be making gestures. In the background the facade of the building of the Congress of Deputies.

The combined impact of these events—particularly the anarchist repression, the republican military threat, and the diplomatic fallout with France—seriously weakened Sagasta’s position. Conservatives and the Dynastic Left capitalized on the situation, accusing the government of incompetence and eroding its parliamentary support. Cánovas publicly criticized the government’s failure to suppress republicanism and blamed its leniency for the unrest.

Sagasta attempted once more to shift the cabinet further leftward, seeking to replace Martínez Campos and Vega de Armijo, and to bring in leaders from the Dynastic Left. When this failed, he accepted a compromise government proposed by Cristino Martos. The new administration was led by José Posada Herrera and included an equal number of fusionist and leftist ministers, with Sagasta stepping aside to become president of the Congress of Deputies. According to José Varela Ortega, Sagasta’s retreat was strategic. He realized that clinging to power risked internal liberal fracture and a potential royal intervention that could have handed leadership to another liberal faction. By stepping back, Sagasta aimed to demonstrate that liberal unity was only possible under his leadership—a political calculation that would soon prove correct.

== Interregnum of the Dynastic Left (October, 1883-January, 1884) ==
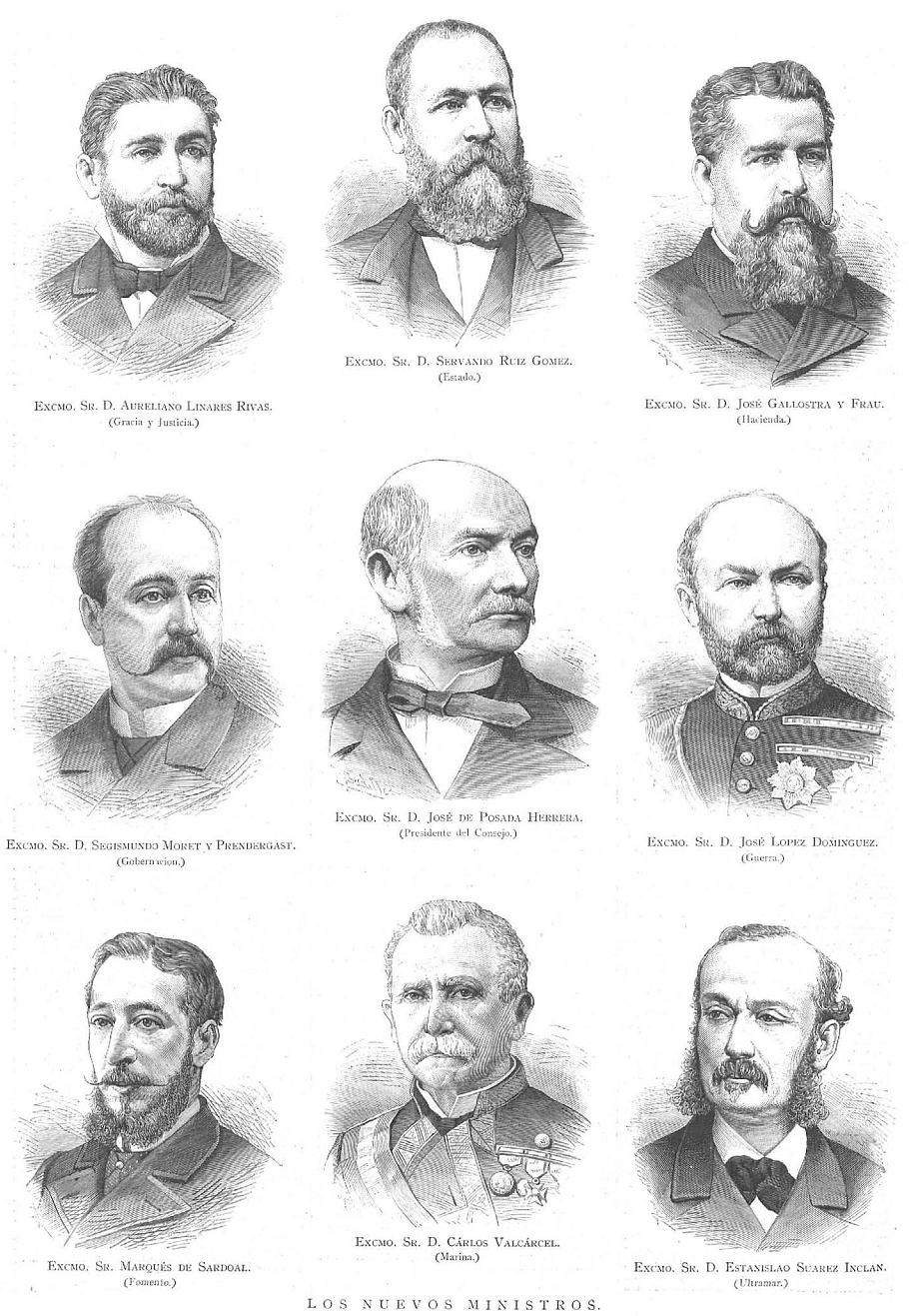
Members of the government of José Posada de Herrera (center). To his right Segismundo Moret (Interior) and to his left General José López Domínguez (War).

Following Sagasta’s resignation on October 11, King Alfonso XII, without consultation, appointed José Posada Herrera as head of government, honoring an agreement between the Liberals and the Dynastic Left. Posada, who had recently joined the leftists, formed a cabinet of “conciliation", equally composed of liberals and leftists. Key figures included Segismundo Moret (Interior), the Marquis of Sardoal (Development), and Cristino Martos, who acted as a de facto political leader. The king imposed General José López Domínguez, also of the Dynastic Left, as Minister of War. As part of the agreement, Sagasta became President of the Congress of Deputies, a role he used to court leftist support with vague promises. General Serrano was appointed President of the Senate.

The government proposed an ambitious reform agenda, including the creation of the Commission of Social Reforms (led by Moret) and the abolition of corporal punishment for patrocinados—freed Cuban slaves still bound by labor obligations under the patronato system. However, without a royal decree to dissolve the Cortes and secure a new majority, the government relied on Sagasta’s party, which held the parliamentary upper hand. As Sagasta put it, “we have a government without a majority and a majority without a government".

Tensions escalated when the government’s speech from the Crown proposed restoring universal male suffrage and amending the Constitution of 1876. In the debate that followed, Sagasta strongly defended shared sovereignty between Crown and Cortes—the cornerstone of the Restoration regime—thus abandoning the principle of national sovereignty once central to progressive liberalism. Historians José Varela Ortega and Feliciano Montero note that this marked the liberal party’s full integration into the canovista framework, consolidating the regime. Carlos Dardé and Manuel Suárez Cortina emphasize that Sagasta aimed to prove liberal unity was impossible without his leadership.

A motion by two fusionist deputies to postpone universal suffrage was approved by 221 votes to 126—an overwhelming rejection of the government's proposal, forcing Posada Herrera to resign. As Sagasta celebrated the outcome, King Alfonso XII called on Cánovas to form a government, interpreting the liberal split as grounds for restoring conservative leadership. This moment reinforced the lesson for liberals: to govern, they had to unite.

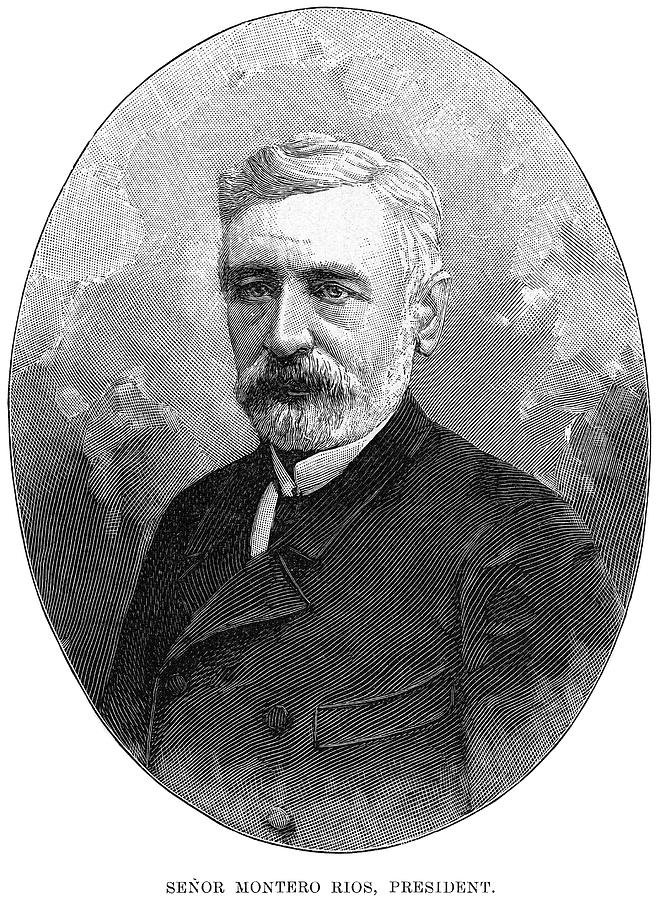
Eugenio Montero Ríos, drafter alongside Manuel Alonso Martínez of the "law of guarantees", the new program of the liberal party approved in 1885.

Following this defeat, most of the Dynastic Left gradually merged with Sagasta’s Liberal Party. The 1884 elections were decisive: the fusionists won over forty seats, while the Dynastic Left secured twelve fewer. The electoral setback led to the collapse of the Left as an independent force. In June 1885, a year and a half after the fall of Posada Herrera’s short-lived government (90 days), the majority of the Dynastic Left formally joined the Liberal Party. The merger was facilitated by the approval of the “Law of Guarantees,” drafted by Manuel Alonso Martínez and Eugenio Montero Ríos. This new liberal platform upheld constitutional rights and liberties, extended male suffrage, and introduced trial by jury. Most significantly, it marked the abandonment of national sovereignty—the defining principle of the 1868 revolutionaries—and accepted the doctrine of shared sovereignty between Crown and Cortes, foundational to the Restoration. A small faction, led by General José López Domínguez, refused to join Sagasta’s party, objecting to the failure to enshrine these guarantees in the Constitution. Nevertheless, the unified Liberal Party had reestablished itself as a credible governing force.

== Second conservative government of Cánovas (1884-1885) ==
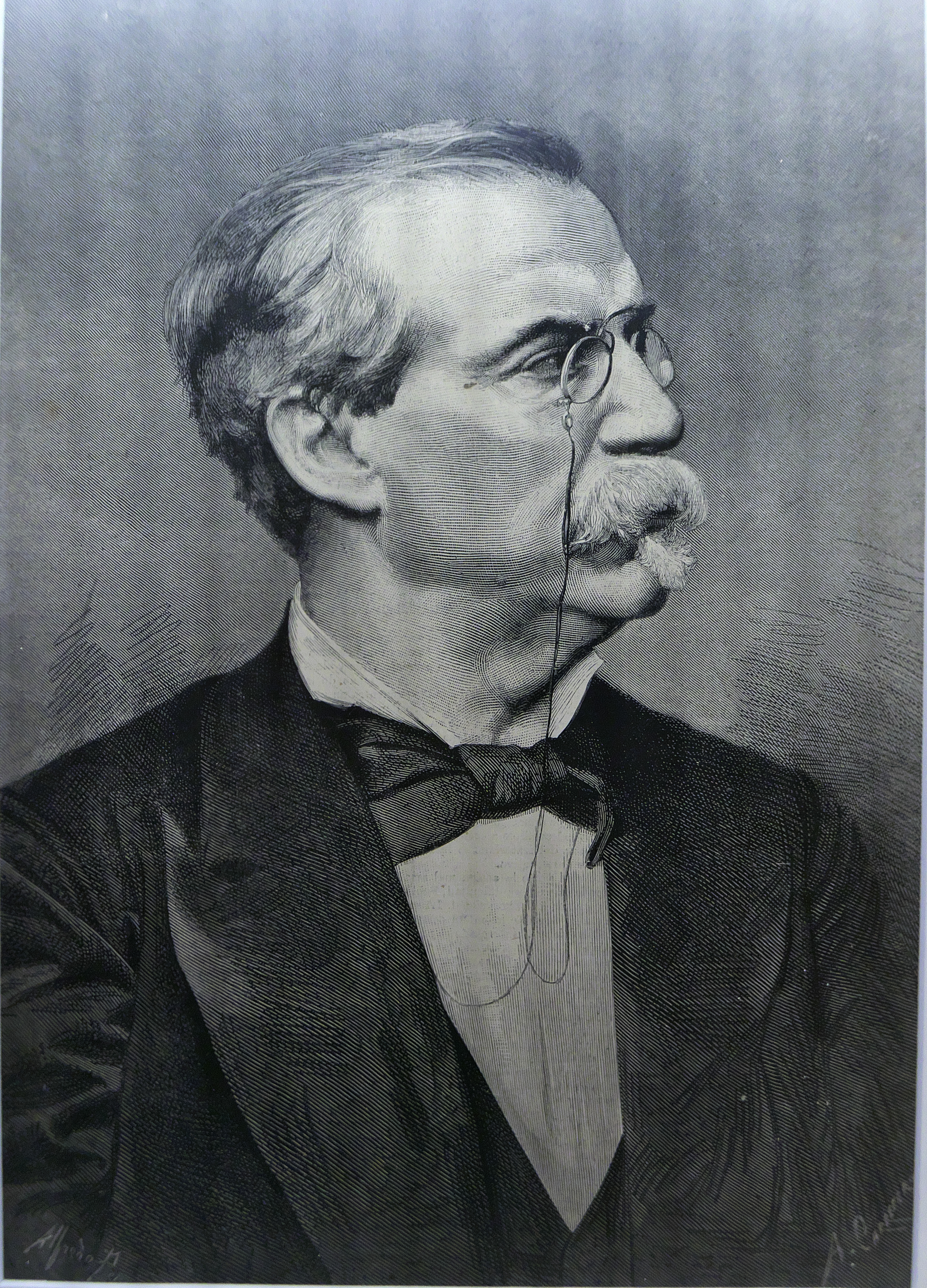
Antonio Cánovas del Castillo in 1884.

In January 1884, after failing to persuade any Conservative leader—including Romero Robledo—to temporarily assume the premiership, Cánovas del Castillo formed a new government himself, under pressure from his party and the king. Romero Robledo returned to the Ministry of the Interior, while his rival Francisco Silvela took charge of the Ministry of Grace and Justice.

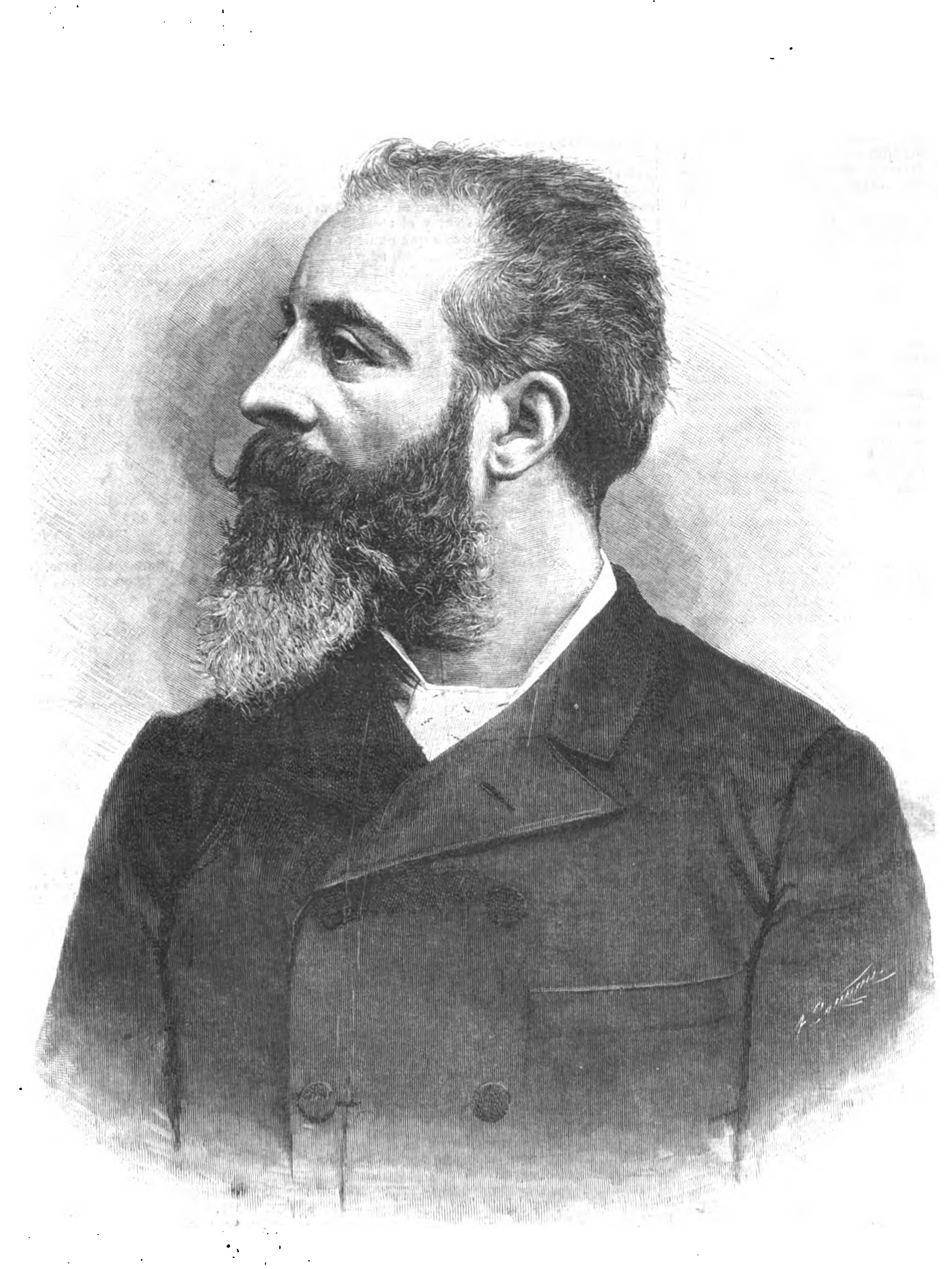
The neo-Catholic Alejandro Pidal y Mon, Minister of Development. "For Cánovas it meant the enlargement of the [conservative] party's base on the right and the integration into the regime of part of the Carlist electorate".

A notable development was the inclusion of neo-Catholic Alejandro Pidal y Mon as Minister of Development, reportedly at the king’s request. Known for his staunch defense of Catholic unity during the 1876 constitutional debates, Pidal had since accepted the existing legal order. In 1880, he urged disillusioned Carlists to join the conservative cause, and in 1881 founded the Catholic Union, aligning with Pope Leo XIII’s more pragmatic approach, which encouraged Catholics to cooperate with liberal regimes for reform “in the Catholic sense.” Within the Spanish Church, bishops were divided between those who maintained a hardline anti-liberal stance—summarized by the popular phrase "Liberalism is sin"—and those who supported the Vatican's more conciliatory direction under the guidance of Nuncio Mariano Rampolla del Tindaro.

Pidal’s entry into the cabinet alarmed liberals and republicans, who feared a stricter application of Article 11 of the Constitution regarding religious freedom. Their concerns intensified in 1885 when Pidal issued a royal decree granting official recognition to private religious schools that met basic criteria, giving a major boost to religious education while public education remained underfunded. Carlists and fundamentalist Catholics, including El Siglo Futuro, criticized Pidal for aligning with liberalism to gain office.

According to historian Feliciano Montero, Pidal’s appointment expanded the Conservative Party's base by integrating moderate Catholic sectors and some Carlist voters. For many Catholics, it represented a tactical choice—supporting the "lesser evil" of Canovist liberalism over revolutionary alternatives.

Railway accident known as the catastrophe of the Alcudia bridge in which 53 people died (La Ilustración Española y Americana, May 8, 1884).

Elections were held on April 27, 1884—the same day as the Alcudia Bridge railway disaster, which claimed 59 lives. Conducted under census suffrage, the elections resulted in a predictable Conservative victory (318 deputies), thanks in large part to Romero Robledo's management from the Interior Ministry. The Progressive Republican Party of Manuel Ruiz Zorrilla boycotted the vote, anticipating manipulation, while Emilio Castelar’s possibilist Republicans participated and won five seats. Romero Robledo’s heavy-handed electoral tactics, including allegations of fraud, drew criticism even from within the Conservative ranks and eventually forced his resignation. His actions prompted liberals and the newly absorbed factions of the Dynastic Left, led by Moret and Montero Ríos, to align with republicans in municipal elections in May 1885, where they defeated the government in Madrid and 27 other cities. Sagasta dismissed the April 1884 Cortes as "dishonored before they were born". Robledo’s mishandling of the 1885 cholera epidemic further discredited him and ultimately led to his removal from government.

The alliance with Catholics, symbolized by Pidal y Mon’s inclusion, was not without difficulties. In mid-1884, his remarks in Parliament concerning the Kingdom of Italy—still unrecognized by the Holy See—sparked a diplomatic crisis. Any perceived slight to the Vatican risked alienating Catholic supporters, while a conciliatory stance could offend the Italian government. Tensions peaked again on October 1, 1884, during the opening of the academic year at the Central University of Madrid. Presiding over the event, Pidal listened as Professor Miguel Morayta—a known Republican and Mason—gave a speech questioning the historical reliability of the Bible and defending academic freedom. In his closing remarks, Pidal responded that such freedom must be exercised “within the laws and the limits established by the Constitution of the Catholic and constitutional monarchy".

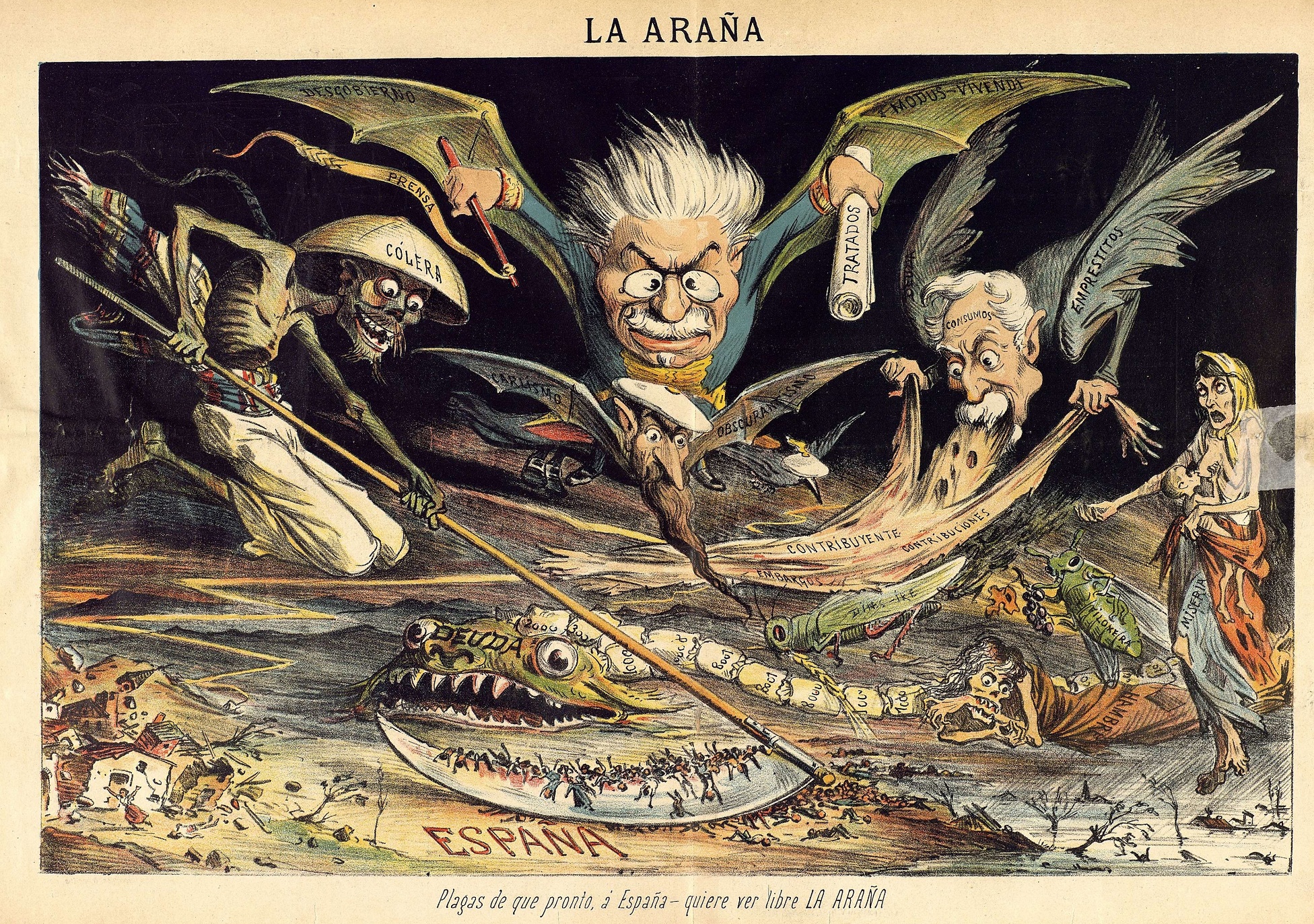
Caricature of La Araña on the plagues that plague Spain (August 15, 1885). Above, Cánovas spreading two wings (Desgobierno, Modus vivendi). In the center the Carlist pretender Charles VII with the body of a bat and in the wings are the words Carlism and Obscurantism. Around the rest of the plagues: cholera, debt, phylloxera, famine, misery, loans, contributions, embargoes...

The most ultramontane sectors of the Catholic hierarchy reacted swiftly to Miguel Morayta’s controversial university speech. Several bishops issued pastorals condemning liberalism, Freemasonry, and secular education. The fundamentalist Catholic press, led by El Siglo Futuro, demanded the resignation of Minister Alejandro Pidal y Mon, accusing him of authorizing and applauding an anti-Christian discourse. The bishop of Palencia went further, publicly questioning the legitimacy of the constitutional regime in a January 1885 pastoral. This prompted a formal protest from the government to the Vatican, which resulted in a papal reprimand of the bishop's position. Most students at the Central University supported Morayta, and their protests were met with heavy repression by public authorities.

The controversy deepened existing divisions within Spanish Catholicism, with the fundamentalist faction openly challenging the authority of Papal Nuncio Mariano Rampolla, who supported a conciliatory, possibilist approach. As historian Feliciano Montero observed, this challenge undermined the Vatican’s diplomatic strategy with the Cánovas government. On April 15, 1885, Cardinal Jacobini, the Vatican Secretary of State, formally disavowed a March 9 article from El Siglo Futuro and demanded a public retraction.

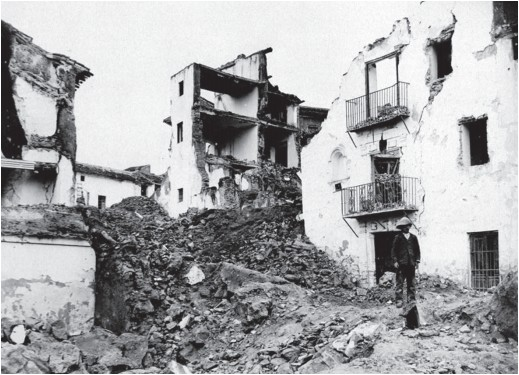
Collapsed houses in Alhama de Granada as a consequence of the Granada earthquake of 1884.

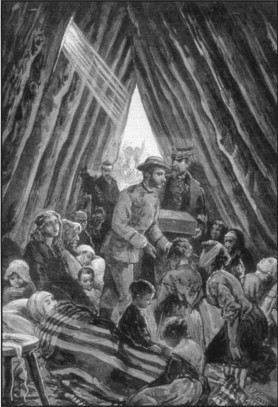
Visit of King Alfonso XII to the victims of the Granada earthquake of 1884.

In late December 1884, a devastating earthquake struck Andalusia, with its epicenter in Granada. It caused severe destruction in Granada and Málaga and affected the provinces of Jaén, Córdoba, and Seville. Hundreds died, thousands were left homeless, and panic spread, especially after several aftershocks. On December 31, some 10,000 people fled Granada. The disaster was exacerbated by a severe cold wave and inclement weather. Despite his poor health—having suffered recurring “intermittent fevers” since autumn 1883—King Alfonso XII visited the affected areas in January 1885, arriving in Granada on the 10th. His letters to his sister Paz described the harsh conditions he endured. Upon returning to Madrid from Málaga on January 22, he remarked: “The administration of those regions is even worse than the earthquakes".

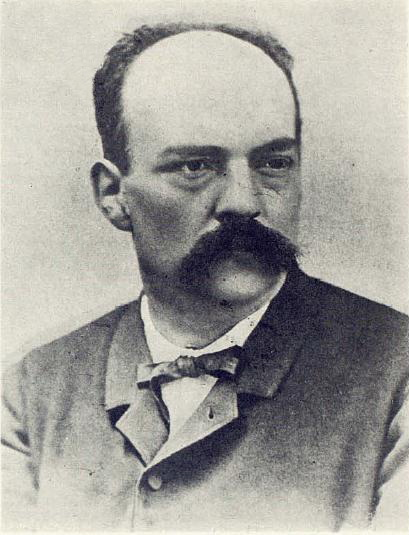
Valentí Almirall, one of the main promoters and editors of the Memorial de greuges ('Memorial of grievances'). The following year he published Lo catalanisme, a key work in the history of political Catalanism.

In March 1885, the government faced another challenge—this time from Catalonia. On March 15, a delegation presented the Memorial de greuges directly to King Alfonso XII, bypassing both Parliament and the government. The document opposed proposed commercial treaties—particularly one with Great Britain—seen as threatening to Catalan industry, as well as plans to unify the Civil Code, which endangered Catalan legal traditions. The Memorial was the result of growing Catalanist sentiment, crystallized at a January 1885 meeting in Barcelona’s Llotja de Mar organized by the Centre Català, the first clearly pro-Catalanist organization, founded in 1882 after the 1881 First Catalanist Congress. Its principal promoter was Valentí Almirall, a former federal republican who, after the collapse of the First Republic, distanced himself from Pi y Margall and adopted a distinctly Catalanist stance. Almirall contributed to drafting the Memorial and would later publish Lo catalanisme (1886), a foundational text of modern Catalanism.

Although the king received the Catalan delegation, led by Mariano Maspons y Labrós, with courtesy and openness, the political class and press in Madrid responded with hostility. In contrast, the delegation was welcomed enthusiastically in Barcelona, where thousands of copies of the Memorial were distributed, helping to spread Catalanist ideas. The document concluded with a call for a new model of coexistence:

How to get out of such a state? There is only one just and convenient way at the same time. The one that emerges from all the pages of this Memoir: to abandon the path of absorption and enter fully into that of true freedom. To stop aspiring to uniformity in order to seek the harmony of equality with variety, that is, the perfect union among the various Spanish regions [...]. When groups or races of different character exist in the country, whose variety is casually demonstrated in the existence of different and even diverse legislations, unification, far from being useful, is detrimental to the civilizing mission of the State.

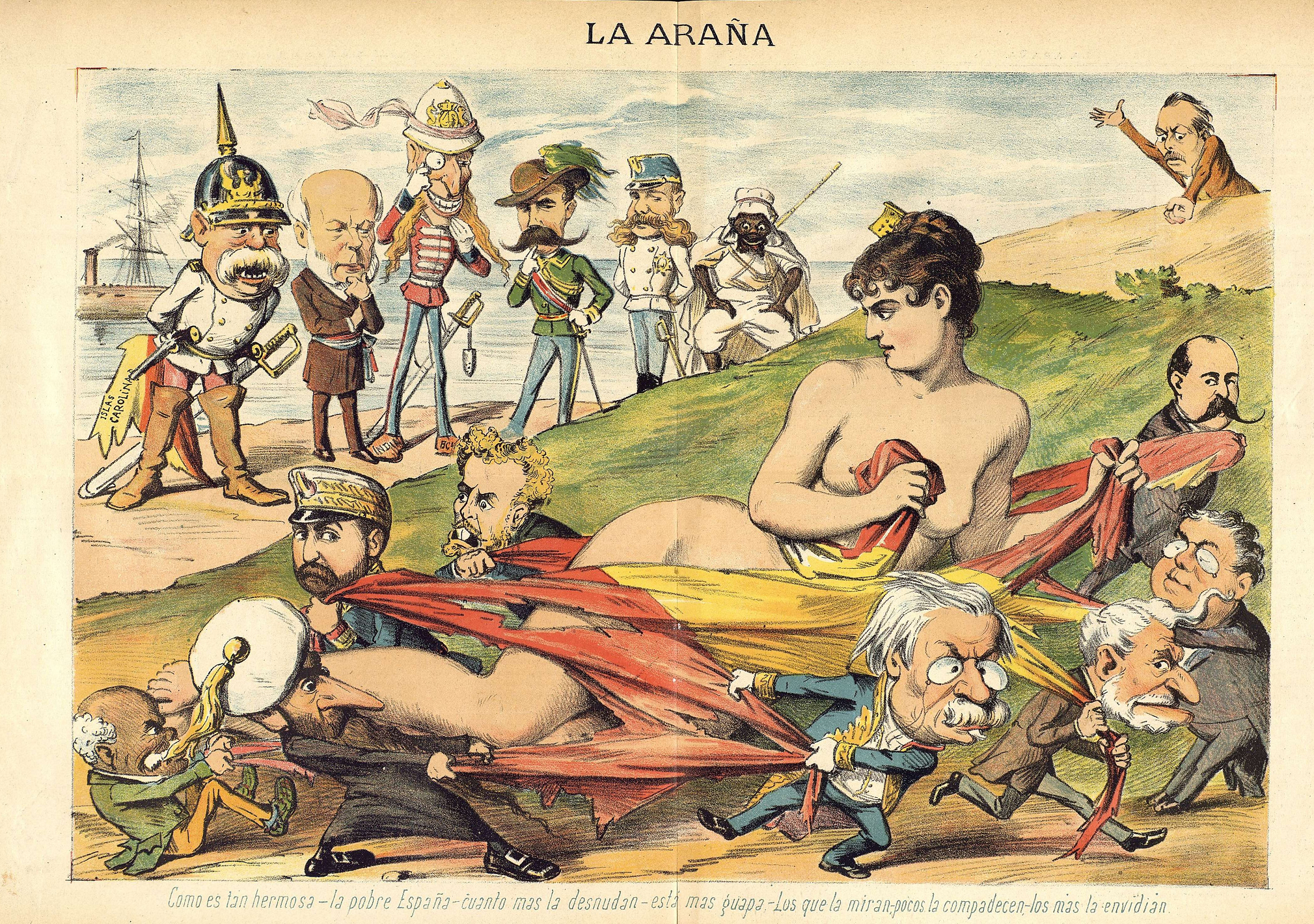
Caricature from La Araña published on August 22, 1885, at the height of the Carolinas crisis. The caption reads: "As she is so beautiful - poor Spain—the more they undress her - the more beautiful she is - Those who look at her - few pity her—the more they envy her".

In the summer of 1885, the Cánovas government faced a major international crisis involving the Caroline Islands. Within the framework of the Berlin Conference, which regulated the colonial division of Africa, the German Empire challenged Spanish sovereignty over the Caroline Islands on August 11, citing Spain’s lack of effective occupation—a key principle established at the conference. In reality, Spain had no administrative presence in the archipelago, whose affairs were managed by the Spanish consul in distant Hong Kong. In response, the government hastily dispatched Lieutenant Enrique Capriles to the island of Yap, where he established a political-military government on August 21. Just six days later, a German gunboat arrived and raised the imperial flag. Spain issued a formal and vigorous protest, accompanied by a memorandum outlining its historical and legal claims to the islands.

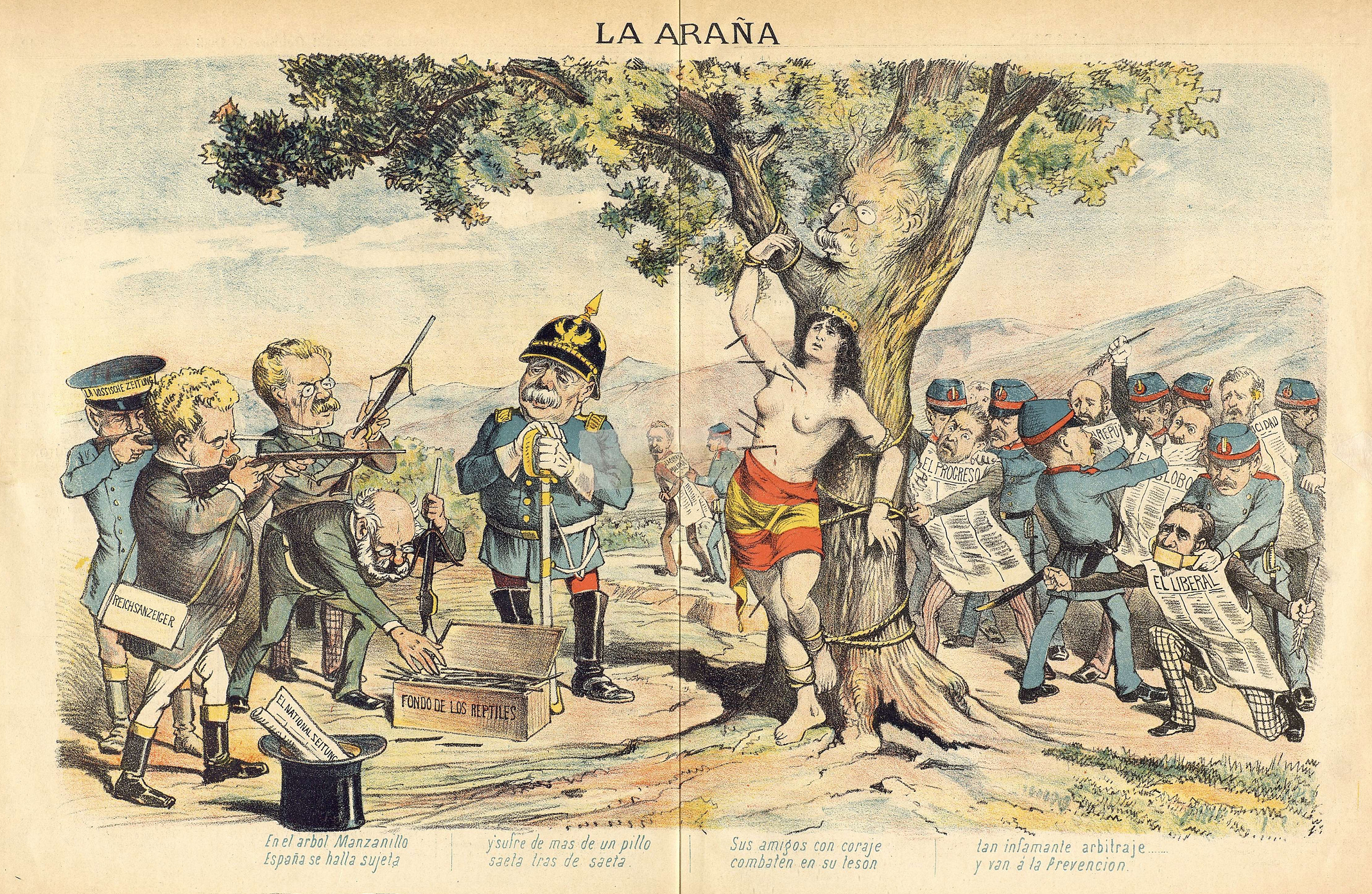
Caricature from La Araña published on October 2, 1885 in the midst of the Carolinas crisis. The caption reads: "In the Manzanillo tree / Spain is subject / and suffers from more than one rogue / arrow after arrow / Her friends with courage / fight in their tenacity / such infamous arbitration / and go to the Prevention". It represents the attacks of the German press, paid by Chancellor Bismarck, towards Spain, represented by a half-naked young woman tied to a tree who embodies the Spanish Prime Minister Cánovas, while the Spanish press that tries to defend her is censored and its leaders arrested.

The German move provoked a wave of nationalist protests in cities such as Barcelona, Valencia, Seville, and Granada. On September 4, demonstrators in Madrid stormed the area around the German embassy, tearing down and burning the German coat of arms and flag in Puerta del Sol. Public outrage led some generals and colonialist organizations to call for a break in diplomatic relations, threatening delicate negotiations already underway between Cánovas and German Chancellor Otto von Bismarck, with the full support of King Alfonso XII. Aware of the king’s worsening health and the potential instability his death could cause, Bismarck proposed Pope Leo XIII as a mediator. Spain accepted, and on October 22 the papal decision was announced. It upheld Spanish sovereignty over the Caroline and Palau Islands, provided Spain established effective military and administrative control. In return, Spain granted Germany commercial and navigational rights, including the ability to set up plantations, naval stations, and coaling depots.

The ruling stated:

1. The sovereignty of Spain over the Caroline and Palau Islands is affirmed.
2. The Spanish Government, in order to make sovereignty effective, undertakes to establish, as soon as possible, in the said archipelago, a regular administration, with sufficient force to guarantee order and acquired rights.
3. Spain offers Germany full and complete freedom of trade, navigation and fishing in the same islands, as well as the right to establish a naval station and a coal depot in them.
4. Germany is also assured the freedom to make plantations on the said islands and to establish agricultural establishments on them in the same way as Spanish subjects.

Coinciding with the Carolinas crisis, a cholera epidemic spread into Spain from France, first affecting the east and eventually reaching much of the country. The government's response, directed by Interior Minister Francisco Romero Robledo, relied heavily on isolation and quarantine, resisting the use of Dr. Jaime Ferrán’s vaccine. His premature declaration of a cholera outbreak in Madrid—when only five cases had been confirmed—triggered public panic and economic disruption. This misstep ultimately forced his resignation.

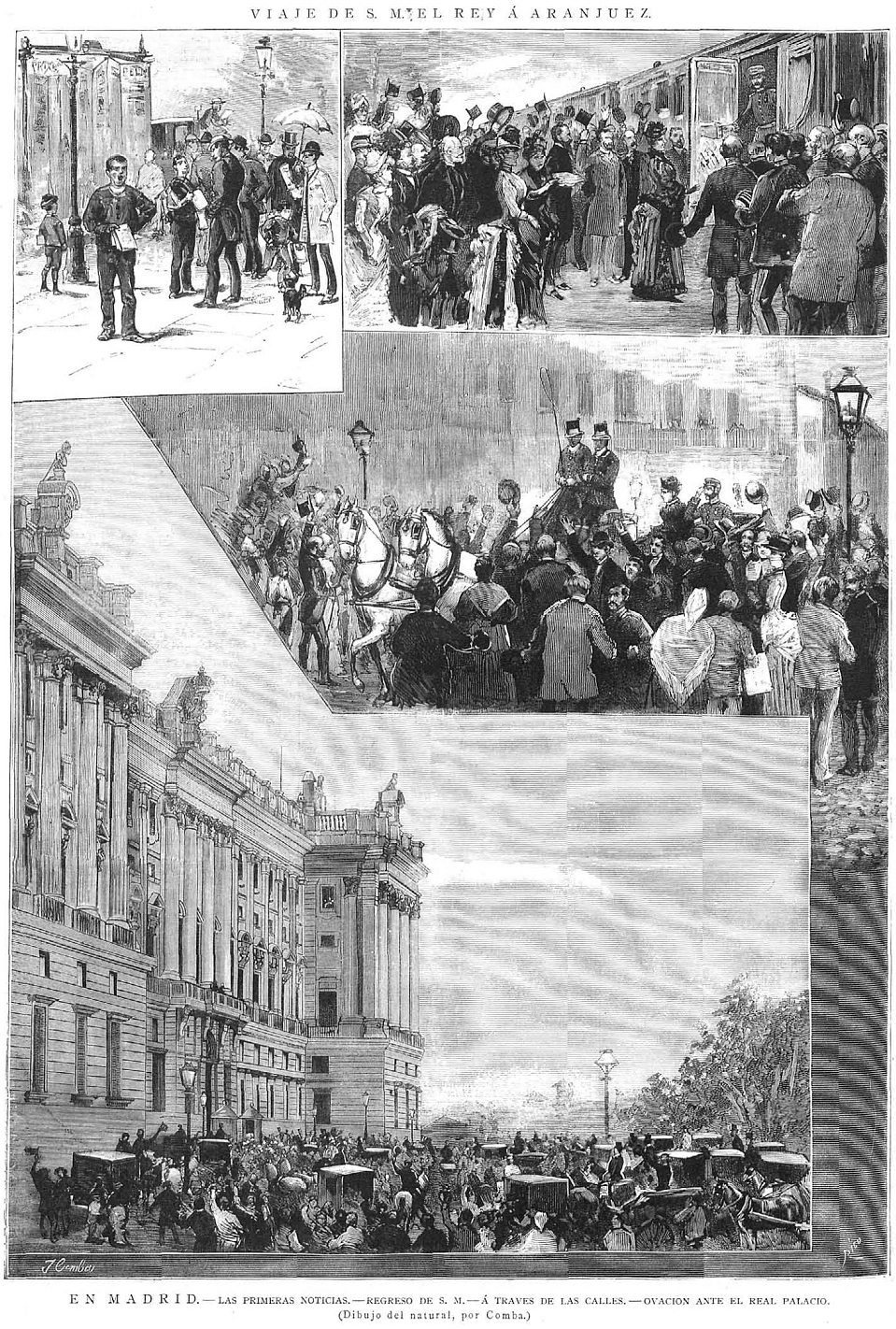
Engravings published by La Ilustración Española y Americana showing the trip of Alfonso XII to Aranjuez to visit the cholera patients and the enormous impact he had among the population who cheered him when he returned to Madrid.

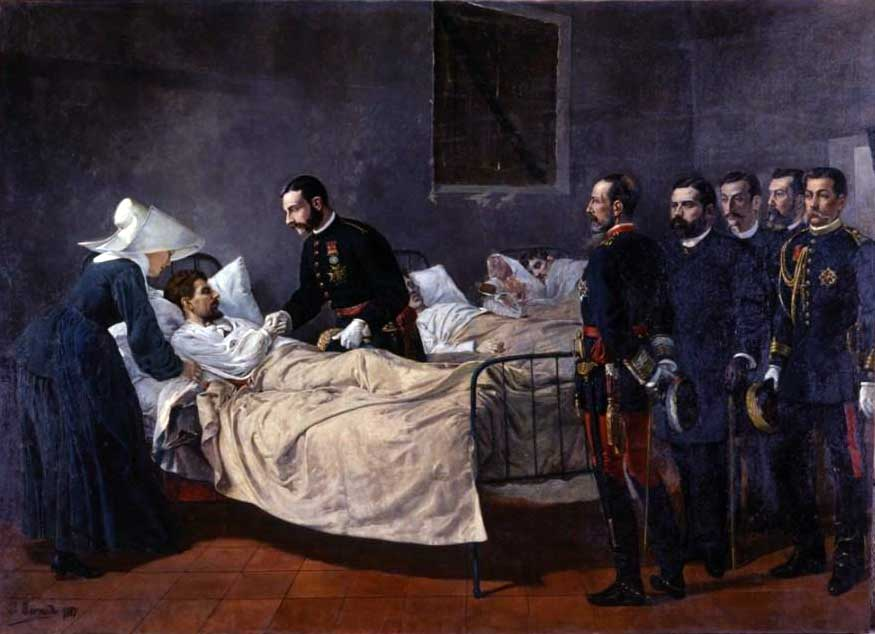
Painting by José Bermudo Mateos representing the visit made by Alfonso XII to a hospital in Aranjuez where cholera patients were admitted. He did not have the approval of the government because he feared for his health.

Despite his deteriorating health—Cánovas privately wrote that the king “resists well and hides the progress of the illness from the Queen and the doctors, but he loses strength every day”—Alfonso XII made a dramatic and unauthorized visit to cholera-stricken Aranjuez on July 2, 1885. Before departing, he wrote to both Cánovas and Queen María Christina, acknowledging that he was disobeying government orders: “Forgive me, dear Don Antonio, if for once I fail in the consideration I owe you…” His visit was met with overwhelming popular acclaim. Upon his return to Madrid, both the Congress and Senate adjourned sessions to welcome him.

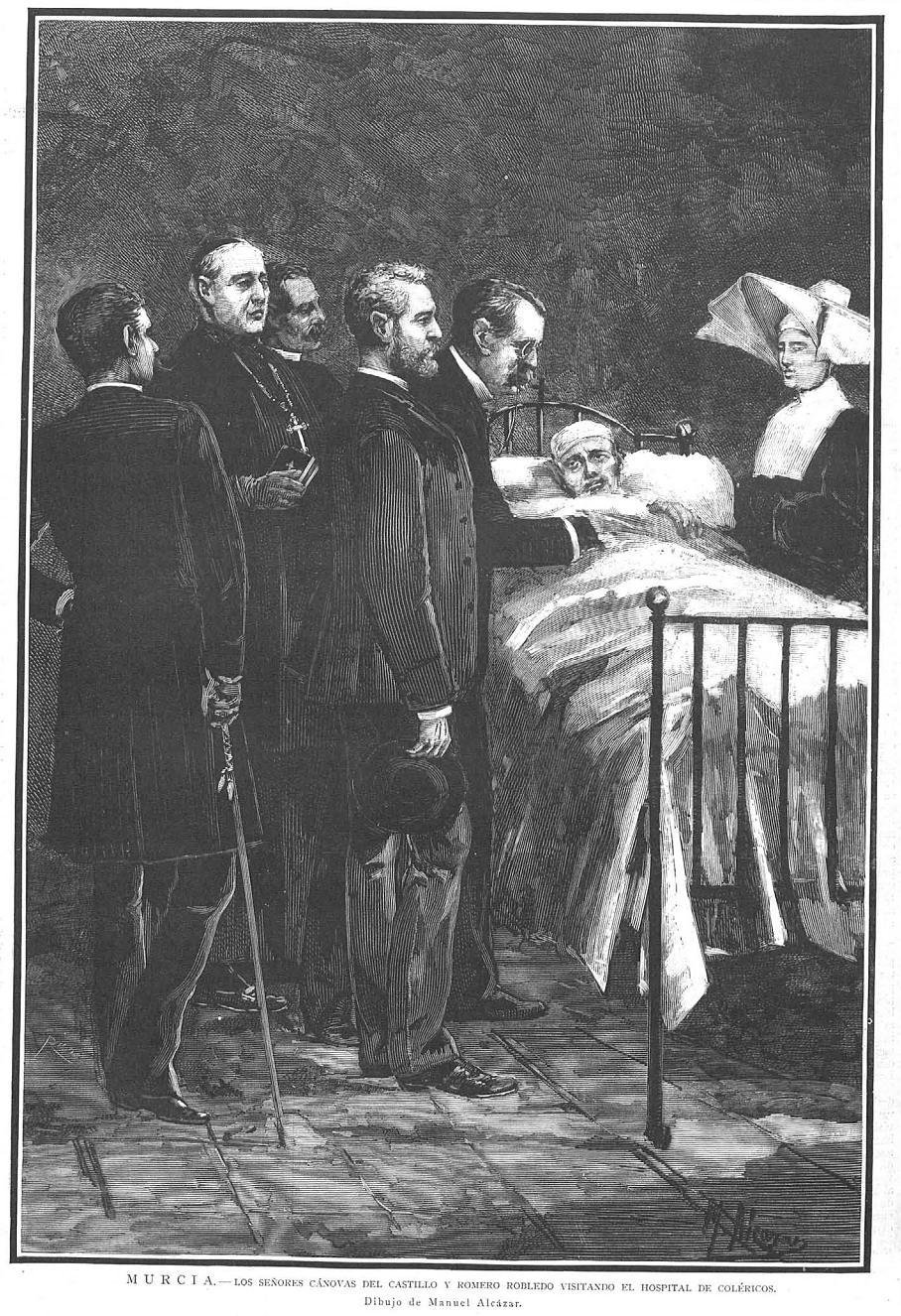
Cánovas, President of the Government, and Romero Robledo, Minister of the Interior, visiting cholera patients in Murcia. La Ilustración Española y Americana, July 8, 1885.

The epidemic exposed profound flaws in Spanish society and governance:

1. Sanitary and infrastructure deficiencies: Many cities still lacked basic sewage systems and access to clean drinking water.
2. Scientific backwardness: The initial resistance to Ferrán’s vaccine illustrated the country's poor scientific culture.
3. Social inequality: Mortality rates were significantly higher among the lower classes, while the wealthy could flee to unaffected areas in the north.
4. The complex role of Catholicism: Clergy often interpreted the epidemic as divine punishment, reinforcing fatalistic attitudes. However, Catholic charitable organizations played a vital role in compensating for the state's near-total absence in public health efforts

== The death of King Alfonso XII and the Consolidation of the Restoration Regime (1885) ==
By August 1885, the declining health of King Alfonso XII had become a constant topic of conversation in Madrid. He suffered from tuberculosis—"with a focus of infection in his childhood, with fleeting manifestations and in a latent state until youth"—which had only fully manifested at the end of 1883. His illness was aggravated by his “hectic nightlife and intense daytime work.

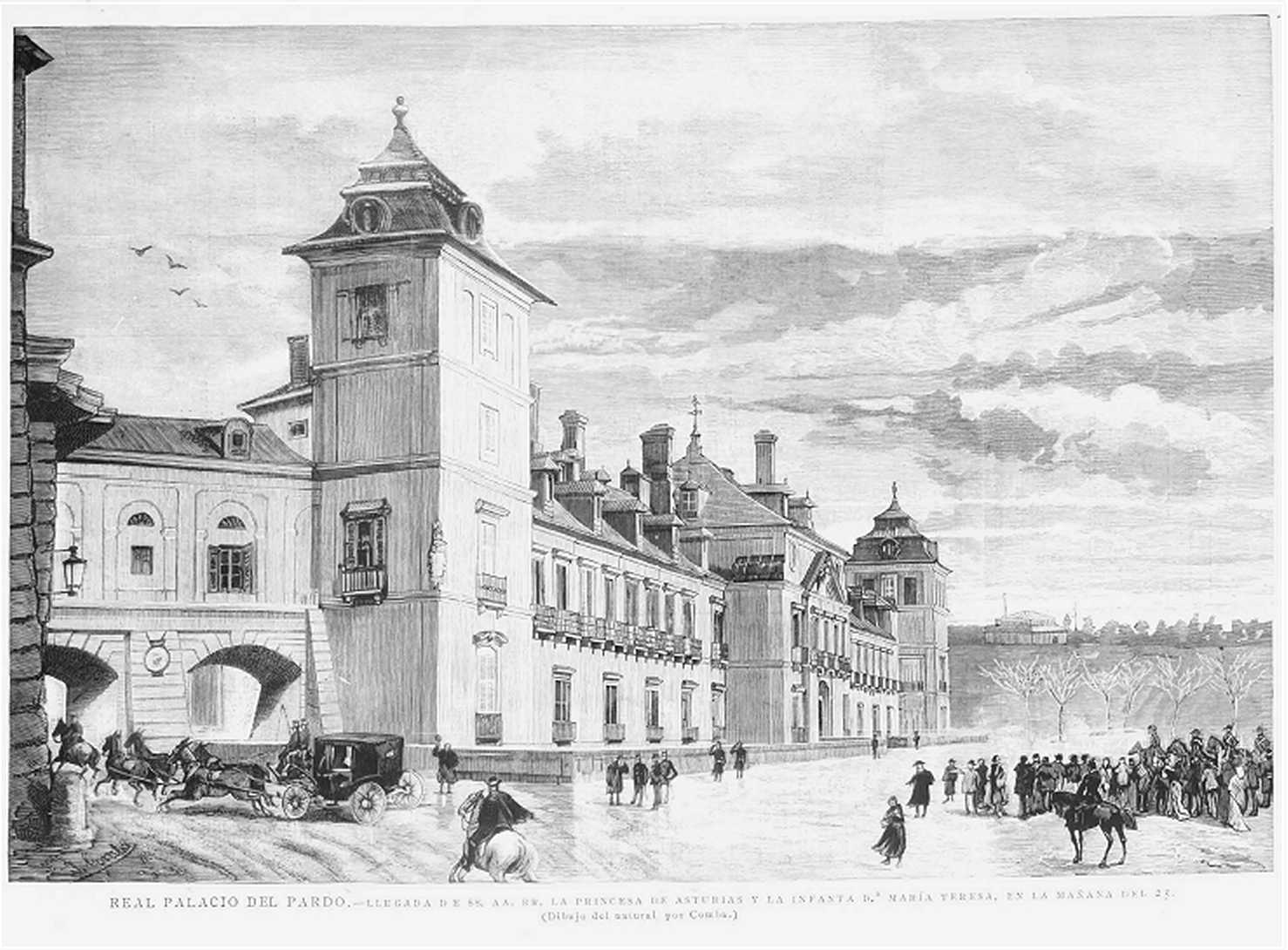
The Palace of El Pardo in 1885. On October 31, Alfonso XII moved there on the recommendation of his doctors. He died there on November 25.

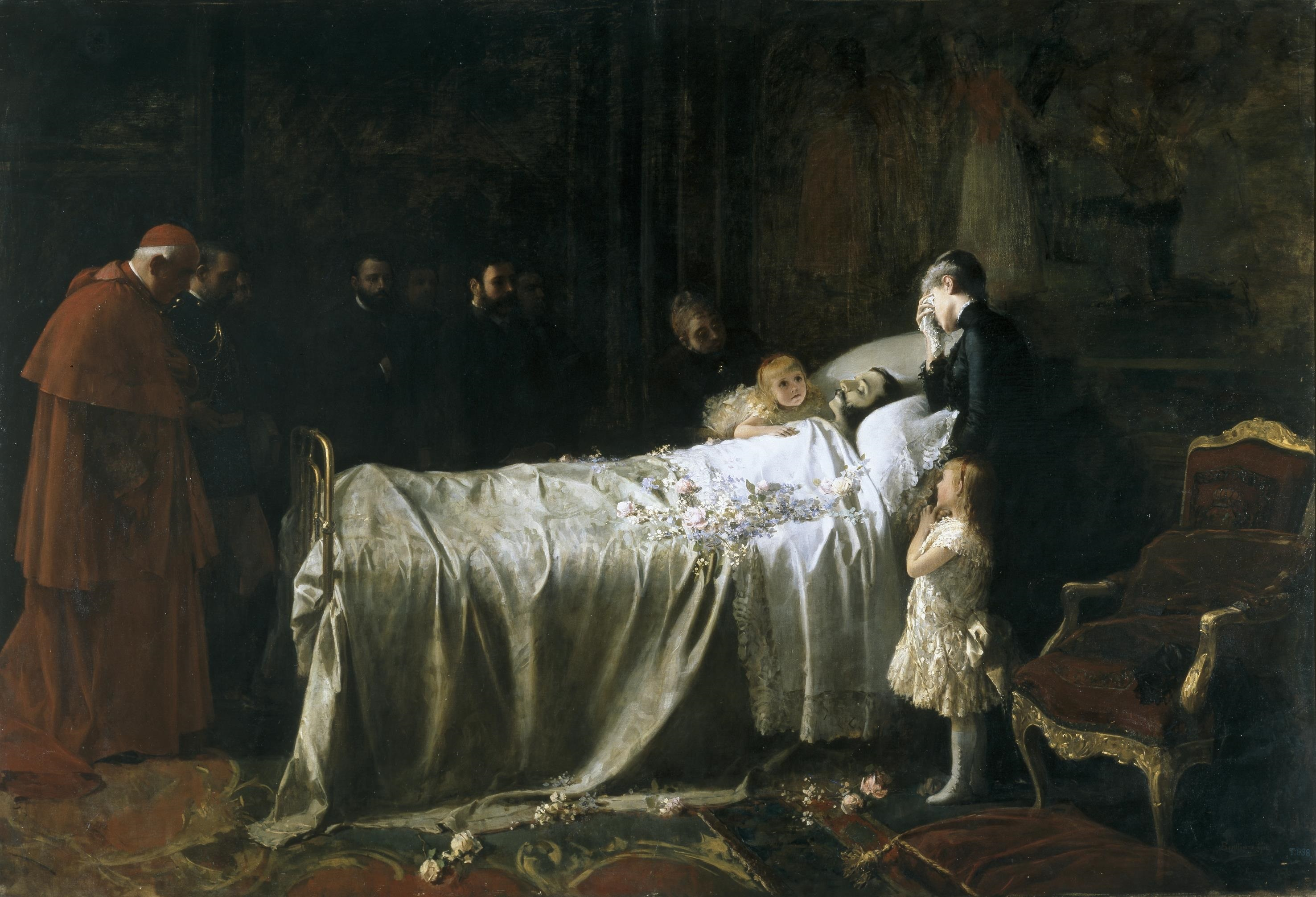
Death of Alfonso XII or the Last Kiss (1887) by Juan Antonio Benlliure. At the bedside Queen Maria Christina of Habsburg and the two daughters of the monarchs.

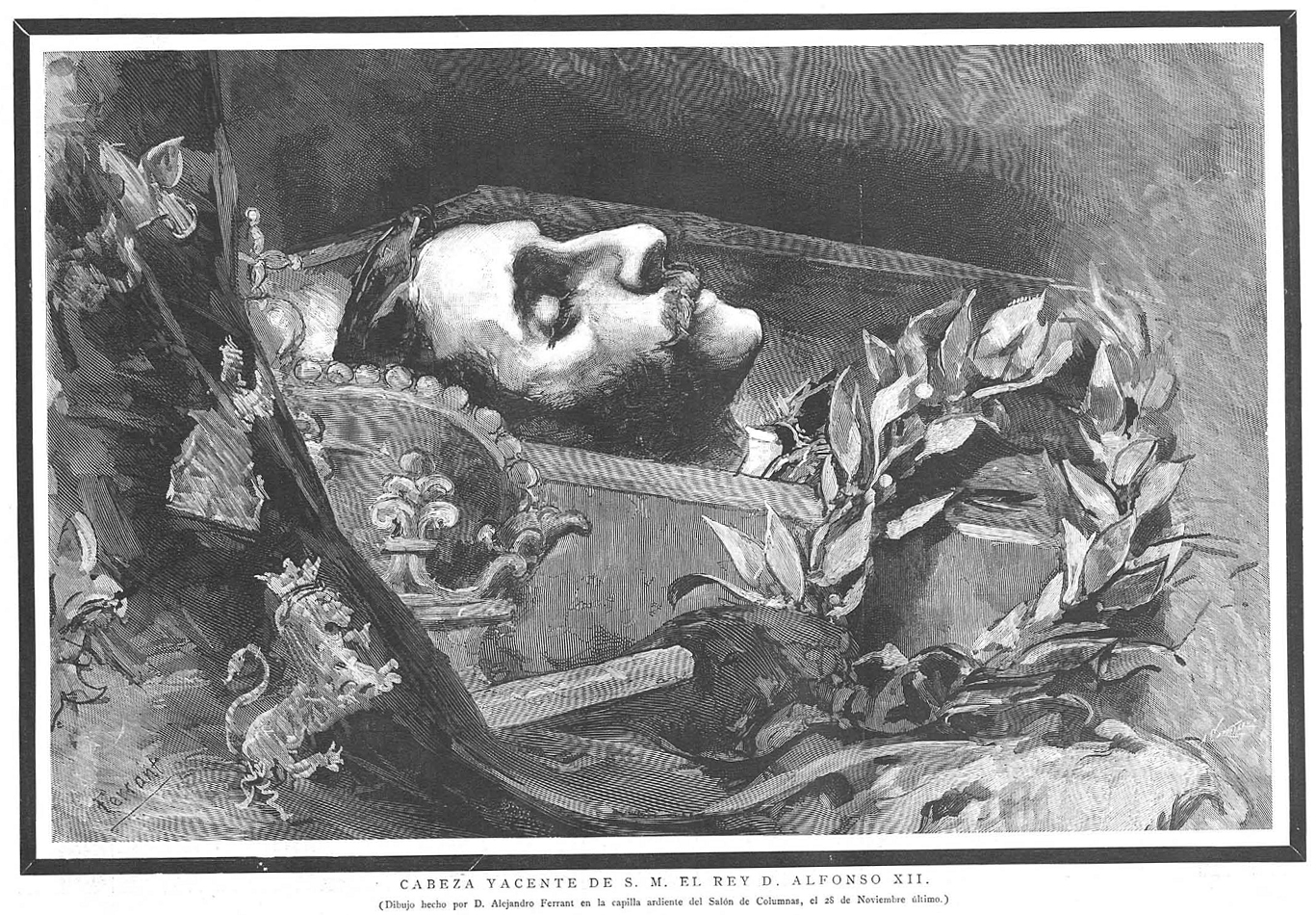
Engraving published on December 8, 1885, thirteen days after the death of the king.

On September 28, 1885, the king’s physician, Laureano García Camisón, informed Prime Minister Cánovas del Castillo that the monarch had only weeks to live. He recommended the king retire to the Palace of El Pardo, hoping the change of environment might help. However, Alfonso XII remained active in his duties and did not leave for El Pardo until October 31. On November 23, the German ambassador found the king pale, breathless, and clearly near death. Alfonso confessed: “I thought I was physically very strong… I have burned the candle at both ends. I’ve discovered too late that it’s not possible to work all day and party all night. I will not do it again in the future". That same day, he suffered an attack of dyspnea. On November 24, his condition was diagnosed as "acute tuberculosis, which puts the patient in grave danger." At 8:45 a.m. on November 25, Alfonso XII died. With him were Queen María Cristina (pregnant at the time), the ex-queen Isabella II, and his sisters Isabel and Eulalia. Dr. García Camisón later clarified El Liberal that the king had died from “acute capillary bronchitis, developed in the course of a slow tuberculosis,” implying that the tuberculosis itself might not have been immediately fatal and could have allowed for a longer life under different circumstances.

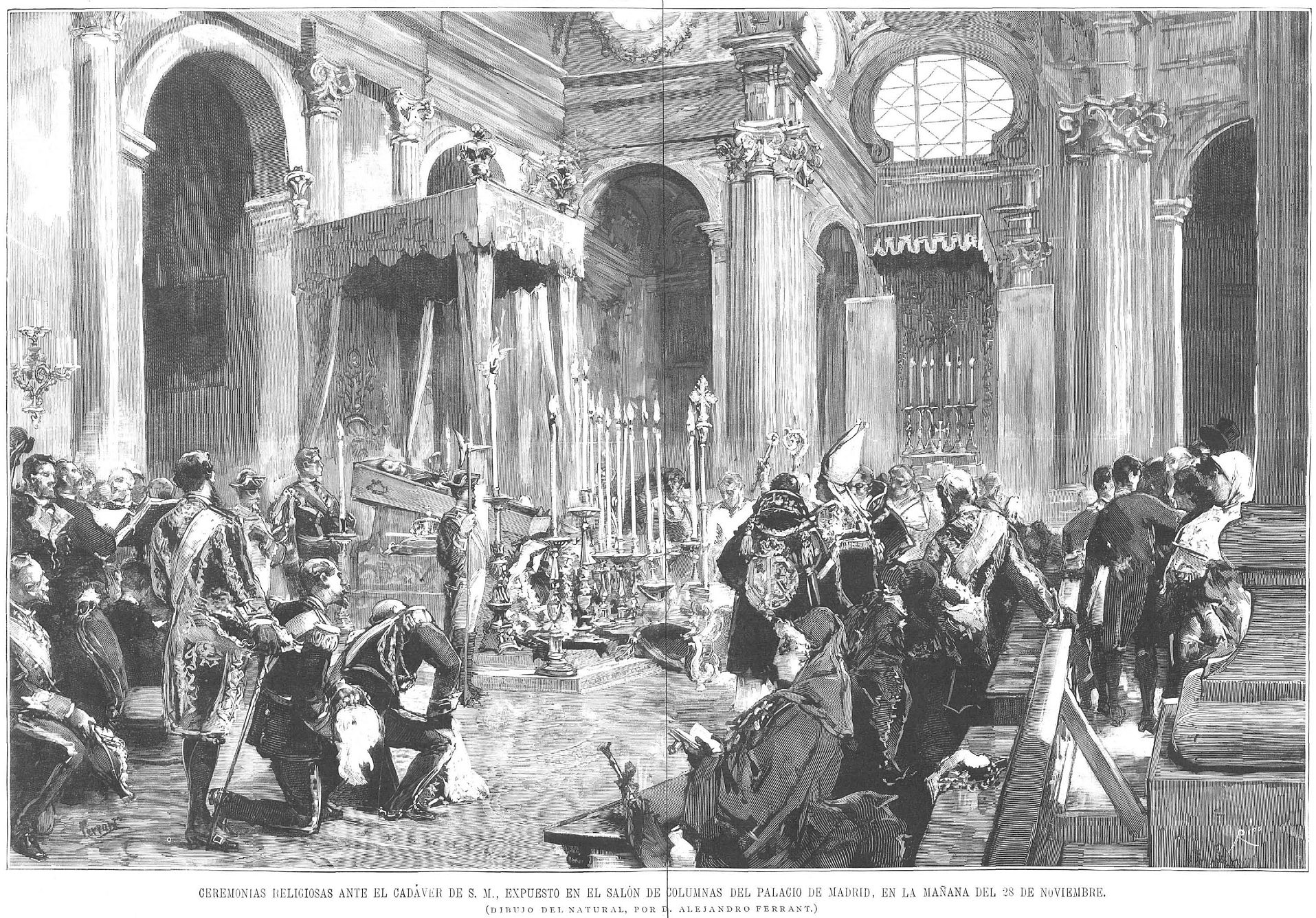
Funeral chapel of Alfonso XII installed in the hall of columns of the Palacio de Oriente in Madrid on November 28, 1885. Thousands of people visited it.

Alfonso XII's death caused widespread shock. "The streets [of Madrid] were impassable... Thousands of carriages crossed in all directions heading to El Pardo," a contemporary chronicler wrote. The king's body was transferred to the Royal Palace, where it lay in state before being taken on November 29 to the Monastery of El Escorial for burial—again accompanied by massive public turnout.

His death triggered serious concerns among political elites. José Varela Ortega described the reaction as “an apocalyptic terror,” as the country faced the uncertain regency of Queen María Cristina de Habsburgo, young, inexperienced, and pregnant with the future Alfonso XIII. "The king's death has produced a singular stupor and uncertainty. No one can guess what will happen,” wrote Marcelino Menéndez Pelayo to diplomat Juan Valera. The government feared simultaneous republican uprisings and a Carlist rebellion. Troops were put on alert, and the stock market plummeted.

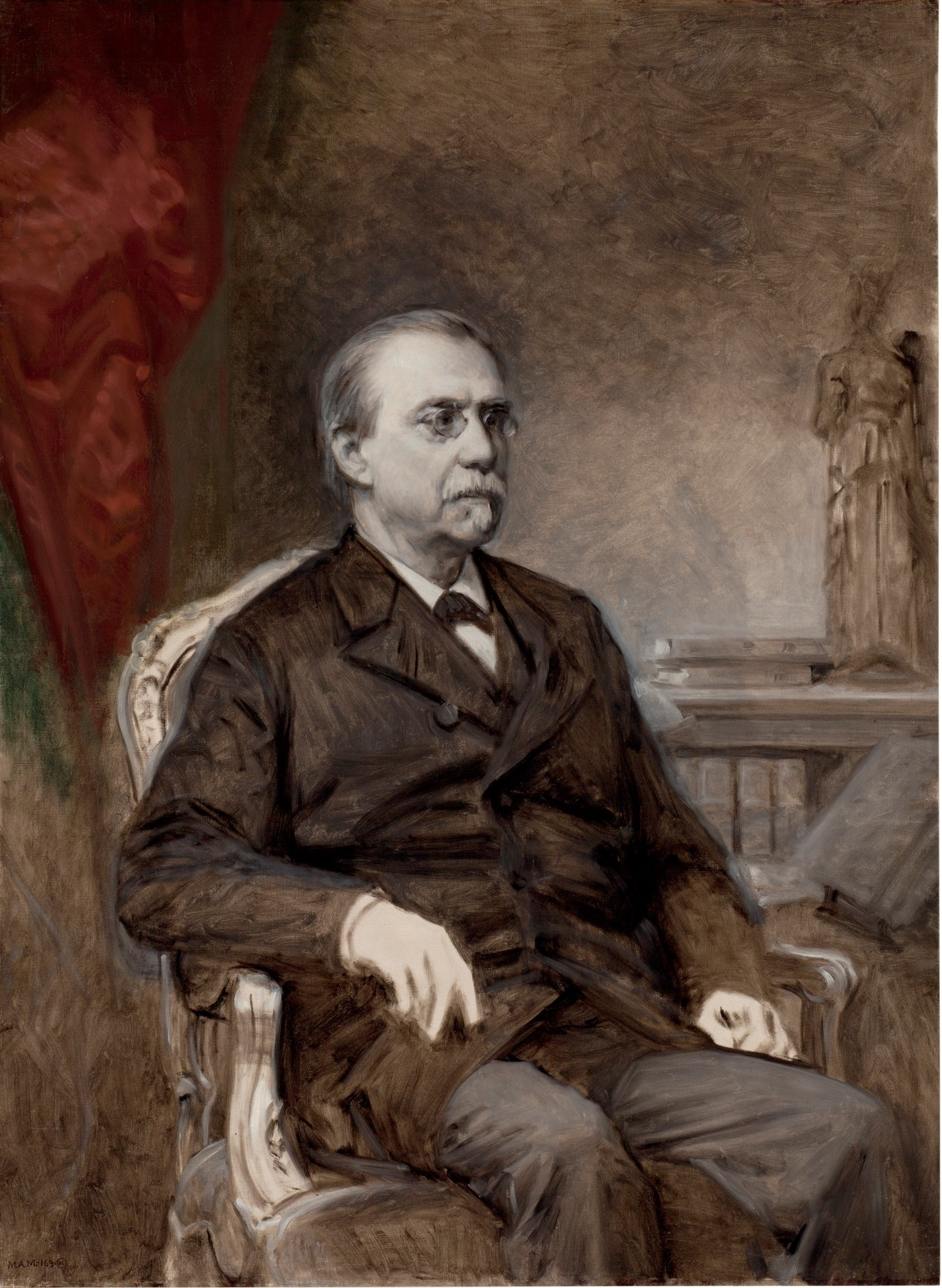
Antonio Cánovas del Castillo in 1889. The improperly named Pact of El Pardo agreed between him and Sagasta meant the consolidation of the political regime of the Restoration.

Amidst this uncertainty, Cánovas, who spoke of the need for a "second Restoration"—“more difficult than the first”—realized that continued conservative rule might push liberals into alliance with the republicans. Facing what Francisco Silvela called a “crisis of fear,” Cánovas chose to resign and advised the regent to call the liberal leader Práxedes Mateo Sagasta to form a government. This political handover, mediated by General Martínez Campos and often (mistakenly) referred to as the "Pact of El Pardo", was sealed during a meeting in the Prime Minister’s office. On November 27, at the Royal Palace, María Cristina formally received the oath of the new liberal government led by Sagasta, and in turn swore loyalty to the Constitution. Cánovas would later explain his resignation in Parliament:

The conviction was born in me that it was necessary that the fierce struggle in which we monarchist parties found ourselves at the time... should cease in any case and cease for quite some time. I thought that a truce was indispensable and that all monarchists should gather around the Monarchy... And once I had thought of this... what was it up to me to do? After having been in government for almost two years and having governed most of the reign of Alfonso XII, it was up to me to address the parties and tell them: 'because the country is in this crisis, do not fight me any more; let us make peace around the throne; let me be able to defend and support myself? That would have been absurd and, besides being ungenerous and dishonest, it would have been ridiculous. Since I stood up to propose concord and to ask for a truce, there was no other way to make people believe my sincerity but to remove myself from power.

Historians largely agree on the significance of the 1885 transition. Ramón Villares wrote, “The death of King Alfonso XII and the agreement or pact of 1885 definitively marked the consolidation of the regime". Feliciano Montero observed that the king’s death tested the strength of the Canovist system, but the accession of a firmly established Liberal Party and its successful governance during the so-called long Parliament helped stabilize the regime.

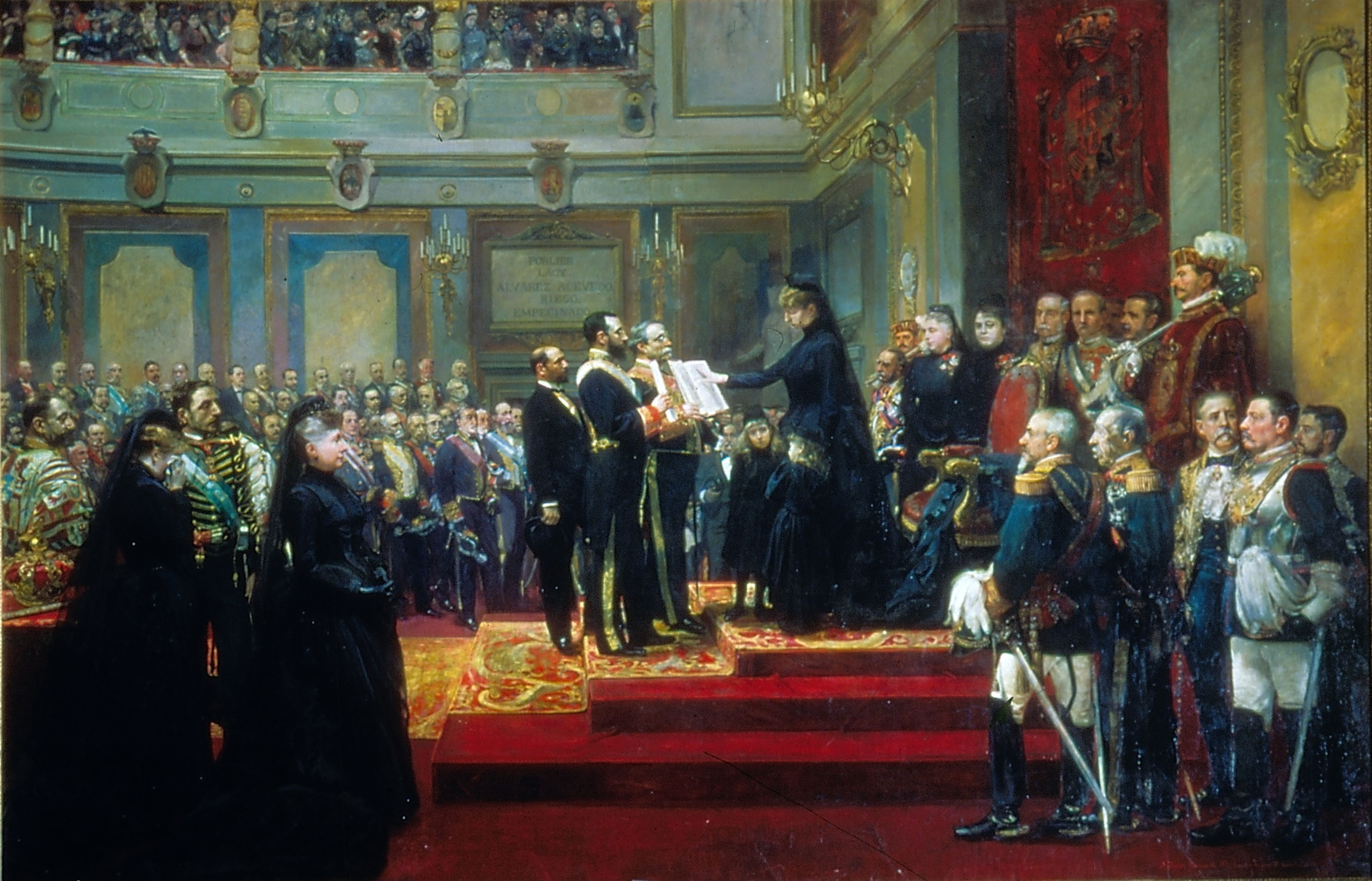
Swearing in of the Constitution by María Cristina (Palacio de las Cortes, December 30, 1885) by Francisco Jover y Casanova and Joaquín Sorolla (1897). Cánovas is holding the copy of the Constitution on which the regent María Cristina de Habsburgo takes the oath. At the lower right is General Arsenio Martínez Campos.

The Catholic Church also played a key role. On December 14, 1885, the nuncio Rampolla issued a declaration backing the regency, grounded in the principles of Pope Leo XIII’s recent encyclical Immortale Dei. It endorsed a moderate stance on the Church-State relationship, recognizing legitimate differences on government forms and affirming "honest freedom of expression"—a clear rejection of ultramontane fundamentalism.

Ángeles Lario concluded that this political agreement marked a pivotal evolution in the Spanish constitutional monarchy. It transformed the Conservative and Liberal parties into the true engines of political life, effectively controlling the monarchy above and manufacturing parliamentary majorities below. But it also sowed the seeds of the system’s eventual weaknesses. As she aptly put it: "The political system of the Restoration suffered from the disease produced by its own success".

== The political groups excluded from the system: Carlists, Republicans, Socialists and Anarchists ==
For the political system of the Restoration to function effectively, the two dominant parties—the Liberal-Conservative Party led by Antonio Cánovas del Castillo and the Liberal-Fusionist Party led by Antonio Cánovas del Castillo and the Liberal-Fusionist Party led by Práxedes Mateo Sagasta—needed to encompass all political tendencies willing to operate within the framework of the constitutional monarchy.[615] Those excluded were either "self-excluded" by rejecting the monarchical form of the state (as in the case of Carlists and Republicans) or by repudiating the foundational principles of bourgeois society, namely private property and individual liberty (as was the case with socialists and anarchists).

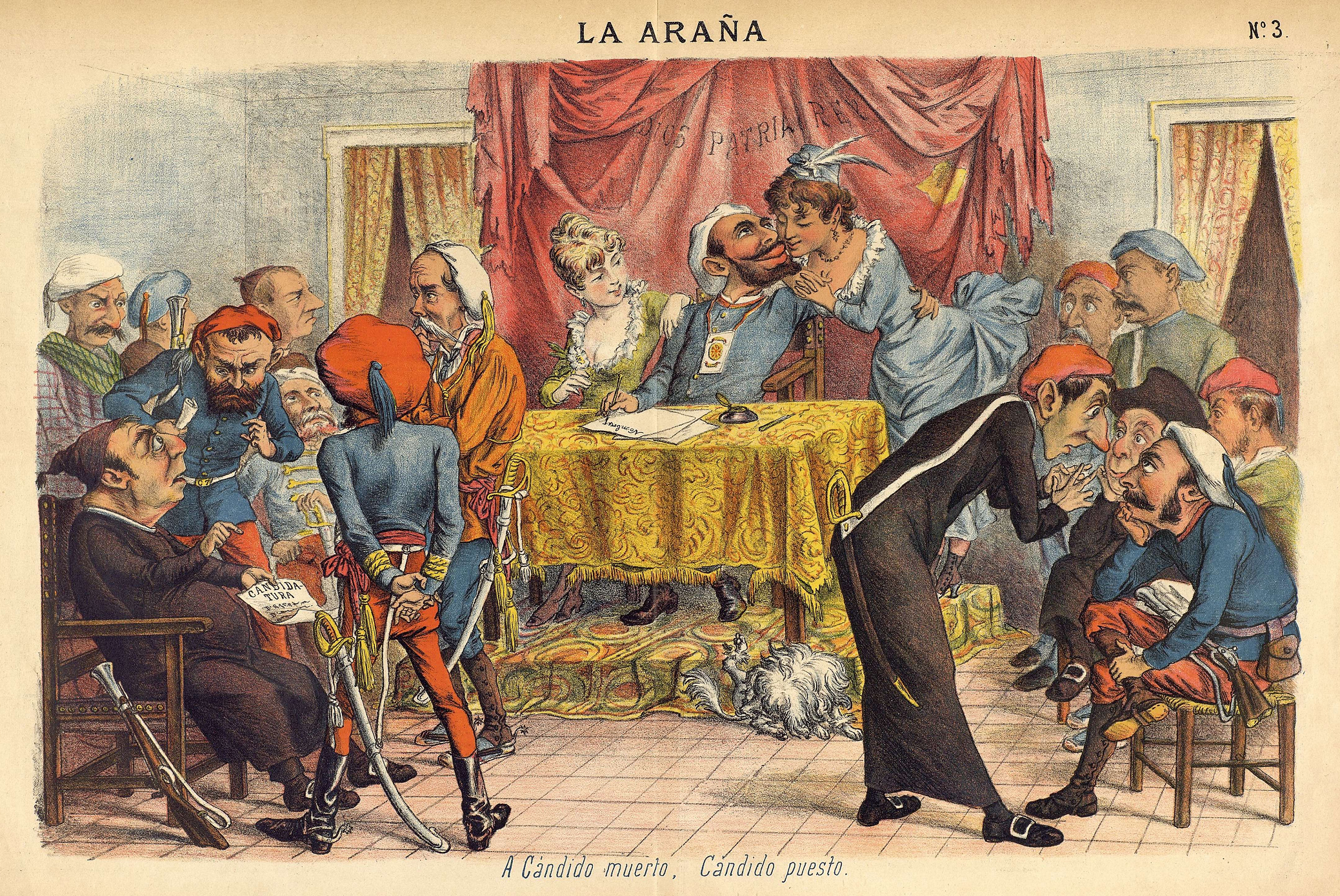
Caricature from La Araña published on August 15, 1885 with the title "A Cándido muerto, Cándido puesto". It represents the appointment by the exiled pretender Carlos VII as the new head of Carlism in the interior of Spain of Ramón Nocedal, after the death of his father Cándido Nocedal.

After their defeat in the Third Carlist War, the Carlists, led by the pretender Carlos VII, largely abandoned insurrection. From exile, Carlos appointed Cándido Nocedal as his representative in Spain in 1878. Nocedal soon became the leading figure of intransigent Carlism, tightly linking the movement with ultra-Catholic ideology and making El Siglo Futuro its principal press organ. Internal tensions emerged between those favoring adaptation to the new regime and those defending strict traditionalism. This divide was also visible within the Catholic Church. The Vatican, distancing itself from the political instrumentalization of religion, stated in a 1882 letter from a cardinal to the Spanish nuncio: "The interest of Religion in Spain demands that the fate of the Church not be identified with that of any party". Despite growing opposition within Carlism—particularly from the Marquis of Cerralbo—Carlos VII maintained his support for Nocedal until the latter’s death in 1885. In 1888, Ramón Nocedal, his son and successor at El Siglo Futuro, led a schism, founding the Integrist Party. Meanwhile, the Marquis of Cerralbo became the new representative of the Carlist pretender in Spain, reasserting traditionalist orthodoxy within a weakened movement.

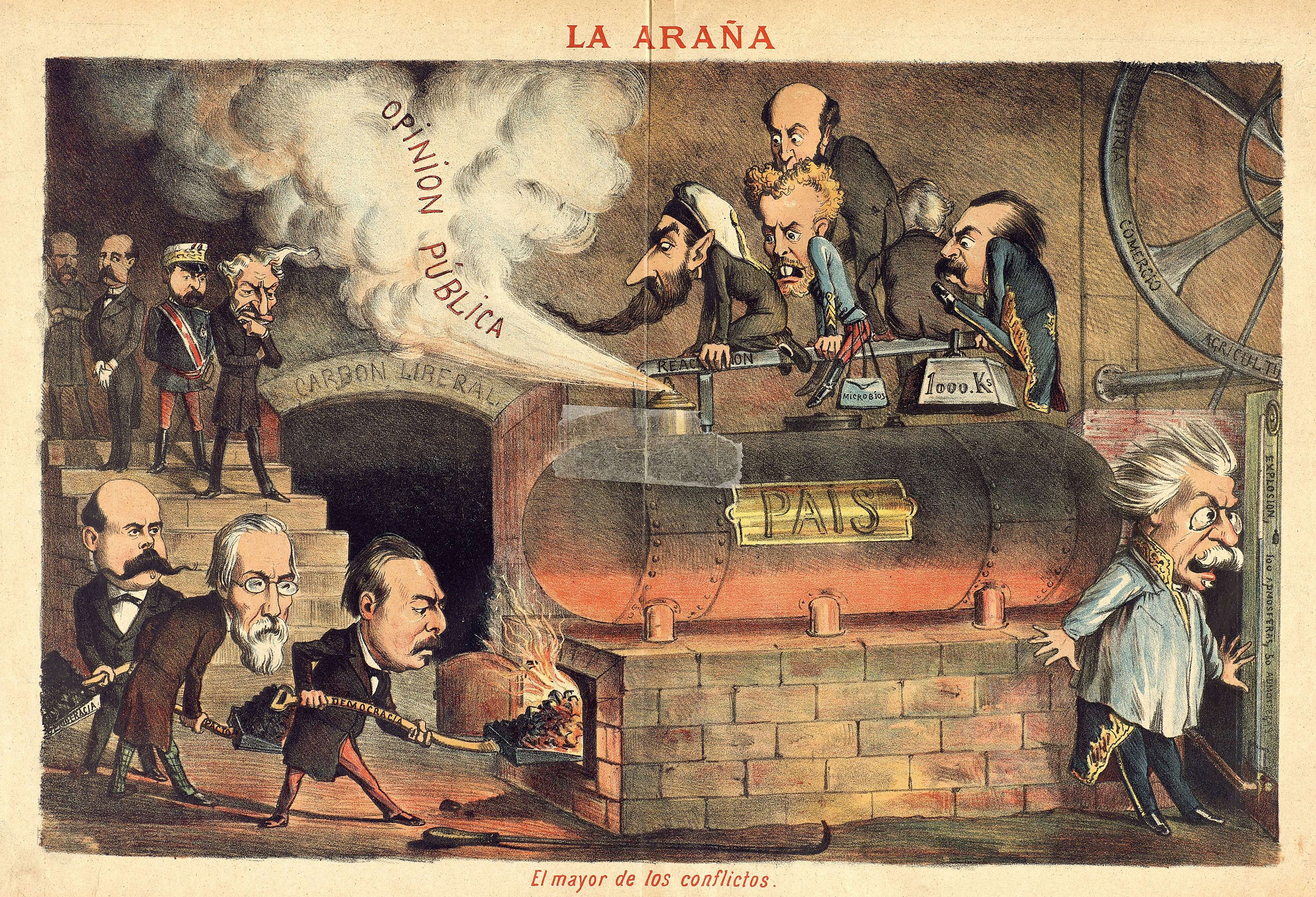
Caricature of La Araña (July 18, 1885) titled "El mayor de los conflictos" in which appear the republican leaders Manuel Ruiz Zorrilla, Francisco Pi i Margall and Emilio Castelar feeding with coal the boiler that represents the country and that is about to burst. Conservative ministers Francisco Romero Robledo and Francisco Silvela try to avoid it, while the President of the Government Cánovas fears the worst. In the background the liberal leader Sagasta meditatively contemplating the scene.

The republican camp remained deeply fragmented, divided on both institutional models (federal vs. unitary republic) and strategy (legalism vs. insurrection). The three main factions were:

- The Federal Republican Party, led by Francisco Pi y Margall and Estanislao Figueras (who died in 1882),
- The Progressive Republican Party, headed by Manuel Ruiz Zorrilla, supported initially by Nicolás Salmerón, and
- The Possibilist Republican Party of Emilio Castelar, which advocated working within the legal framework.

Strategically, Castelar was open to cooperating with Sagasta's liberals if they embraced democratic reforms (e.g., universal suffrage, jury trials), a position echoed by Salmerón, who later founded the Centralist Republican Party. In contrast, Ruiz Zorrilla, exiled in Paris, remained committed to insurrection, promoting military conspiracy through the clandestine Republican Military Association.

From 1875 to 1881, multiple republican conspiracies failed, resulting in arrests and deportations. However, the political opening following Sagasta’s rise to power in 1881 encouraged some republicans to engage legally, while the military took on a greater role in activism. The 1883 insurrection, which involved garrisons in Badajoz, Santo Domingo de la Calzada, and La Seo de Urgel, failed due to lack of broader military support.

Until 1881, Spanish anarchists, organized under the clandestine Spanish Regional Federation of the IWA, operated underground. After the liberal opening that year, they founded the Federation of Workers of the Spanish Region (FTRE) at the Workers' Congress of Barcelona. The FTRE rapidly grew, reaching 60,000 members, particularly strong in Andalusia and Catalonia. However, the Mano Negra affair—an alleged anarchist conspiracy in Andalusia—led to a harsh crackdown. Though the FTRE denied involvement, its public credibility suffered, and it dissolved in 1888. It was succeeded by the Anarchist Organization of the Spanish Region, which returned to more clandestine, decentralized forms of activism.

Spanish Marxist socialism emerged from the small group expelled from the IWA, led by Pablo Iglesias. In May 1879, the Spanish Socialist Workers Party (PSOE) was founded in a Madrid tavern. Legalization followed in 1881, and the first Central Committee was established. The party’s first national congress was held in August 1888 in Barcelona, just days after the foundation of the General Union of Workers (UGT) during the 1888 Barcelona Workers' Congress. The PSOE defined its aim as: The complete emancipation of the working class; that is, the abolition of all social classes and their transformation into a single class of workers, owners of the fruits of their labor, free, equal, honest, and intelligent". Despite its ambitious goals, the movement remained marginal in this early stage. The UGT began with just 3,355 members and was concentrated in urban industrial centers.

== Bibliography ==
- Burdiel, Isabel (2010). Isabel II. Una biografía (1830-1904) (in Spanish). Madrid: Taurus. ISBN 978-84-306-0795-2.
- Castells, Luis (2003). Dardé, Carlos (ed.). "La abolición de los Fueros vascos" (PDF). Ayer (in Spanish) (52). Dossier: ‘’La política en el reinado de Alfonso XII’’: 117–150.
- Claret Miranda, Jaume; Santirso, Manuel (2014). La construcción del catalanismo. Historia de un afán político (in Spanish). Madrid: Los Libros de la Catarata. ISBN 978-84-8319-898-8.
- Dardé, Carlos (1996). La Restauración, 1875-1902. Alfonso XII y la regencia de María Cristina (in Spanish). Madrid: Historia 16-Temas de Hoy. ISBN 84-7679-317-0.
- — (2003). Dardé, Carlos (ed.). "En torno a la biografía de Alfonso XII: cuestiones metodológicas y de interpretación" (PDF). Ayer (in Spanish) (52). Dossier: ‘’La política en el reinado de Alfonso XII’’: 39–56.
- — (2003a). Dardé, Carlos (ed.). "Presentación" (PDF). Ayer (52). Dossier: ‘’La política en el reinado de Alfonso XII’’: 11–13.
- — (2021). Alfonso XII. Un rey liberal. Biografía breve (in Spanish). Madrid: Ediciones 19. ISBN 978-84-17280-70-3.
- De la Granja, José Luis; Beramendi, Justo; Anguera, Pere (2001). La España de los nacionalismos y las autonomías (in Spanish). Vol. 38 of Historia de España 3er. Milenio, directer by Elena Hernández Sandoica. Madrid: Síntesis. ISBN 84-7738-918-7.
- Elliott, John H. (2018). Catalanes y escoceses. Unión y discordia [Scots and Catalans] (in Spanish). Barcelona: Taurus. ISBN 978-84-306-1988-7.
- Espadas Burgos, Manuel (1974). Alfonso XII en el centenario de la Restauración (in Spanish). Series of conferences on illustrious Madrid residents, No. 4. Legal Deposit 14,057. Madrid: Instituto de Estudios Madrileños.
- Gómez Ochoa, Fidel (2003). Dardé, Carlos (ed.). "La formación del Partido Conservador: la fusión conservadora" (PDF). Ayer (in Spanish) (52). Dossier: ‘’La política en el reinado de Alfonso XII’’: 57–90.
- Jover, José María (1981). "La época de la Restauración. Panorama político-social, 1875-1902". Revolución burguesa, oligarquía y constitucionalismo (1834-1923) (in Spanish). Vol. VIII of Historia de España, directed by Manuel Tuñón de Lara. Barcelona: Labor. pp. 269-406. ISBN 84-335-9428-1.
- Lario, Ángeles (1993). "La muerte de Alfonso XII y la configuración de la práctica política de la Restauración". Espacio, Tiempo y Forma, Serie V, H.ª Contemporánea (in Spanish). 6: 139–176.
- — (2003). Dardé, Carlos (ed.). "Alfonso XII. El rey que quiso ser constitucional" (PDF). Ayer (52). Dossier: ‘’La política en el reinado de Alfonso XII’’: 15–38. Archived from the original (PDF) on 2024-10-10.
- Martorell Linares, Miguel (2003). Dardé, Carlos (ed.). "La política económica en el reinado de Alfonso XII: una década tranquila" (PDF). Ayer (in Spanish) (52). Dossier: ‘’La política en el reinado de Alfonso XII’’: 151–174.
- Milán García, José Ramón (2003). Dardé, Carlos (ed.). "Los liberales en el reinado de Alfonso XII: el difícil arte de aprender de los fracasos" (PDF). Ayer (in Spanish) (52). Dossier: ‘’La política en el reinado de Alfonso XII’’: 91–116.
- Montero, Feliciano (1997). "La Restauración (1875-1885)". In Montero, Feliciano; Tusell, Javier (eds.). La Restauración. De la Regencia a Alfonso XIII (in Spanish). Volumen XI. Historia de España-Espasa. Madrid: Espasa-Calpe. pp. 1–188. ISBN 84-239-8959-3.
- Roldán de Montaud, Inés (2003). Dardé, Carlos (ed.). "La política española en Cuba: una década de cambios (1876-1886)" (PDF). Ayer (in Spanish) (52). Dossier: ‘’La política en el reinado de Alfonso XII’’: 175–206.
- Romero Salvador, Carmelo (2021). Caciques y caciquismo en España (1834-2020) (in Spanish). Prologue by Ramón Villares. Madrid: Los Libros de la Catarata. ISBN 978-84-1352-212-8.
- Seco Serrano, Carlos (2007). Alfonso XII (in Spanish). Barcelona: Ariel. ISBN 978-84-344-5210-7.
- Suárez Cortina, Manuel (2006). La España Liberal (1868-1917). Política y sociedad (in Spanish). Vol. 27 of the History of Spain 3rd. Milenio, directed by Elena Hernández Sandoica. Madrid: Síntesis. ISBN 84-9756-415-4.
- Varela Ortega, José (2001) [1977]. Los amigos políticos. Partidos, elecciones y caciquismo en la Restauración (1875-1900) (in Spanish). Prologue by Raymond Carr. Madrid: Marcial Pons. ISBN 84-7846-993-1.
- Vilches, Jorge (2001). Progreso y Libertad. El Partido Progresista en la Revolución Liberal Española (in Spanish). Madrid: Alianza Editorial. ISBN 84-206-6768-4.
- Villares, Ramón (2009). "Alfonso XII y Regencia. 1875-1902". In Villares, Ramón; Moreno Luzón, Javier (eds.). Restauración y Dictadura (in Spanish). Vol. 7 of Historia de España, directed by Josep Fontana and Ramón Villares. Barcelona-Madrid: Crítica/Marcial Pons.

Preceded by Sexenio Democrático	Reign of Alfonso XII of Spain; 1874 - 1885	Succeeded by Regency of Maria Christina of Austria
