= List of historic properties in Tempe, Arizona =

- City
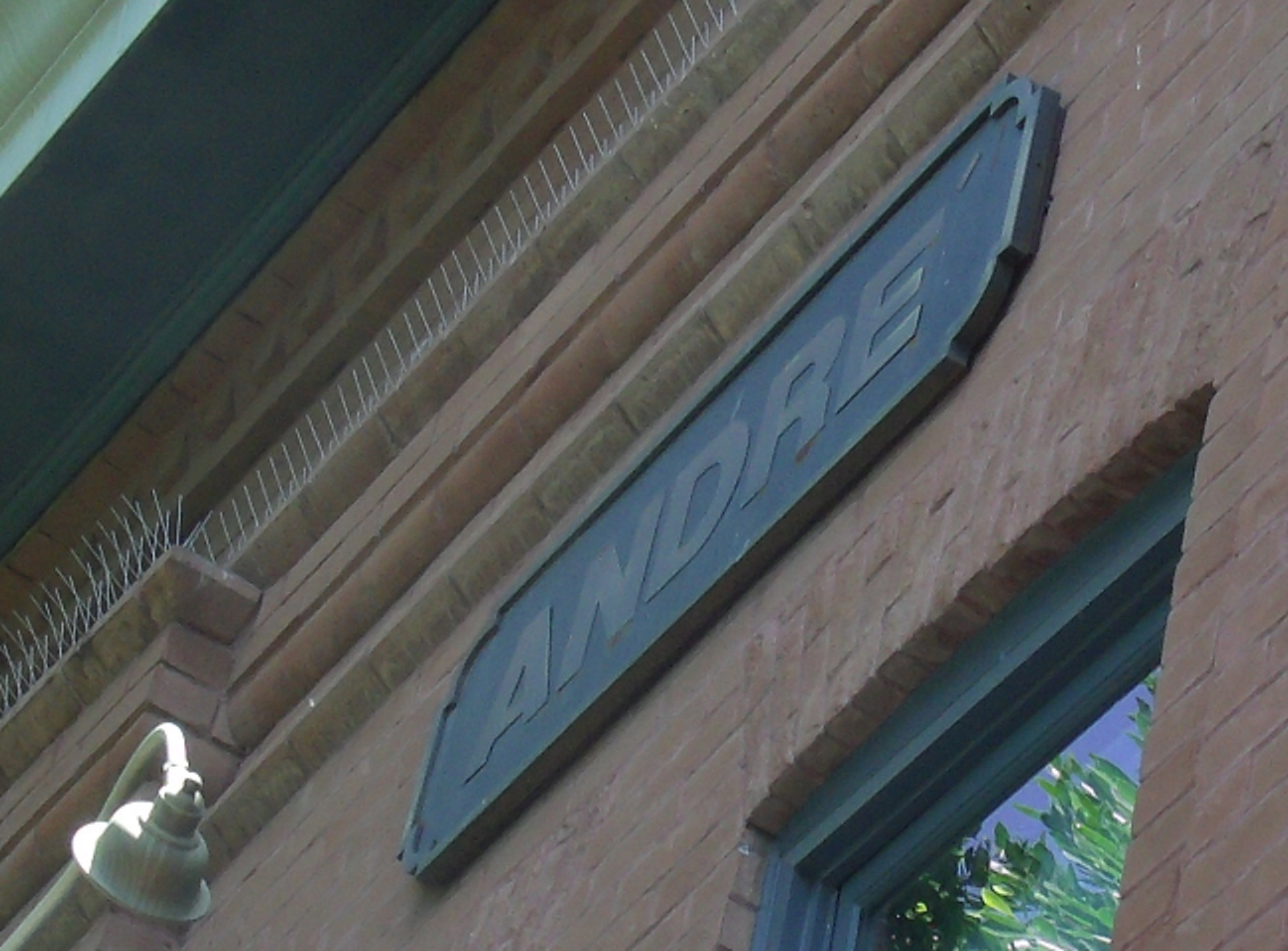
- Andre Building built in 1888

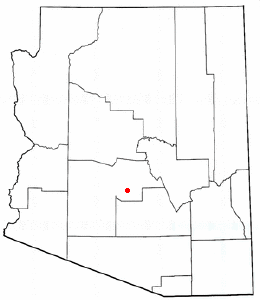
- Location in Maricopa County and the state of Arizona

This is a list, which includes a photographic gallery, of some of the remaining historic structures and monuments in Tempe, Arizona. Tempe, known as Oidbaḍ by the Pima Native-American tribe, was also known as Hayden's Ferry during the territorial times of Arizona. It is a city in Maricopa County, Arizona

== Brief history ==
The area where Tempe is currently located was once inhabited by the Hohokam between A.D. 750 and 1450. Many of the petroglyphs made by them can be seen from the trails on the south side of "A" mountain. The area, which at one time belonged to Mexico, was later inhabited by the Salt River Pima-Maricopa Indian tribes before the arrival of the European settlers from the eastern coast of the United States.

In 1865, the United States established a military fort which was named Fort McDowell in what was then known as the Arizona Territory. The fort was near the Salt River and as such allowed the settlement of a small agricultural community called "Hayden's Ferry," named after a ferry service operated by Charles T. Hayden. The community's name was changed to "Tempe" after pioneer Darrell "Lord" Duppa compared the Salt River valley to the Vale of Tempe near Mount Olympus in Greece.

In 1885, the 13th Arizona Territorial Legislature chose Tempe for the site of the Territorial Normal School, which became Arizona Normal School, Arizona State Teachers College, Arizona State College and finally Arizona State University. In 1887, the Phoenix Railroad was built and crossed the Salt River at Tempe, linking the town to the rest of the nation. The city was incorporated in 1894.

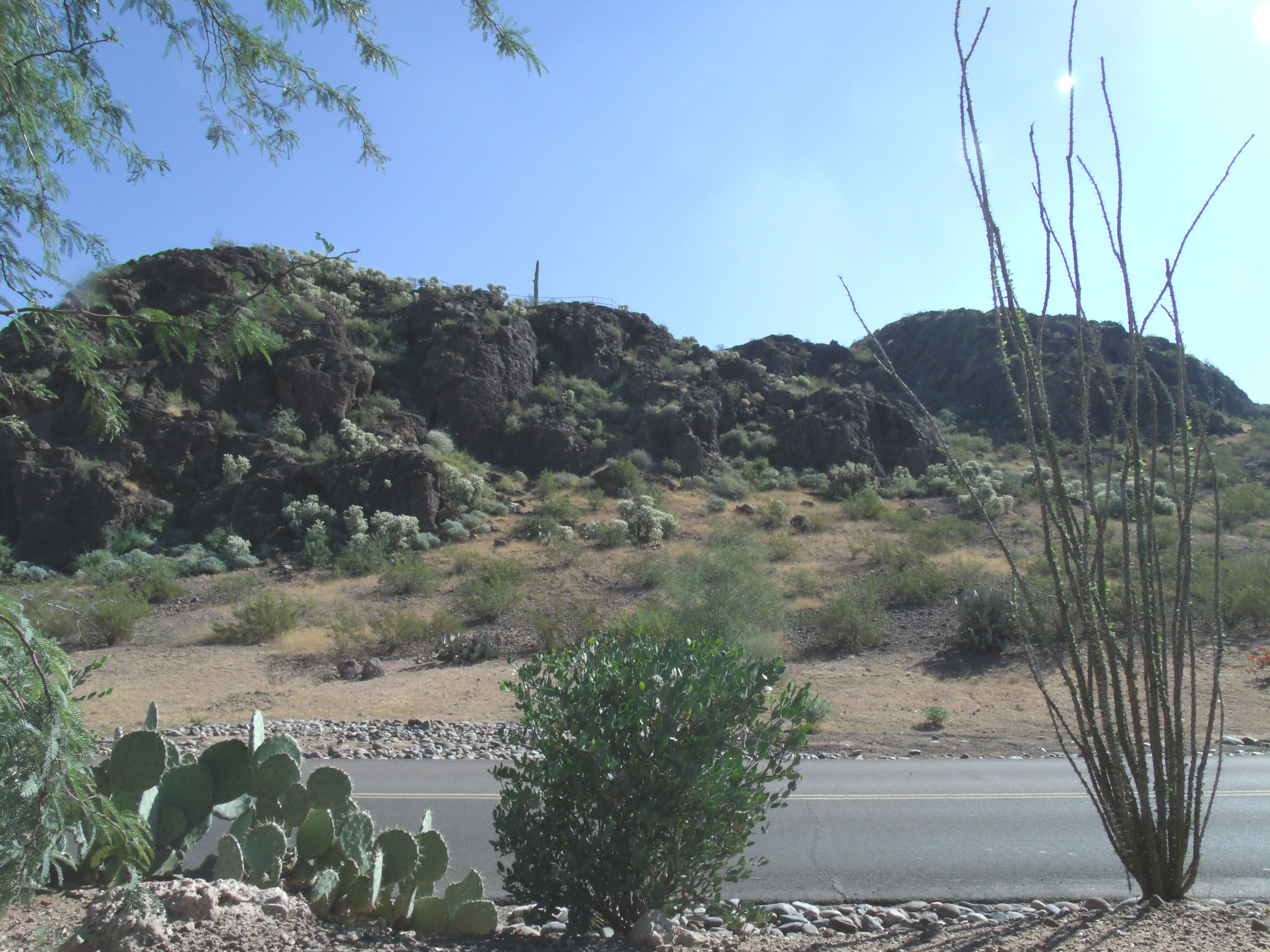
The Double Butte Cemetery is named after the Double Butte Mountain

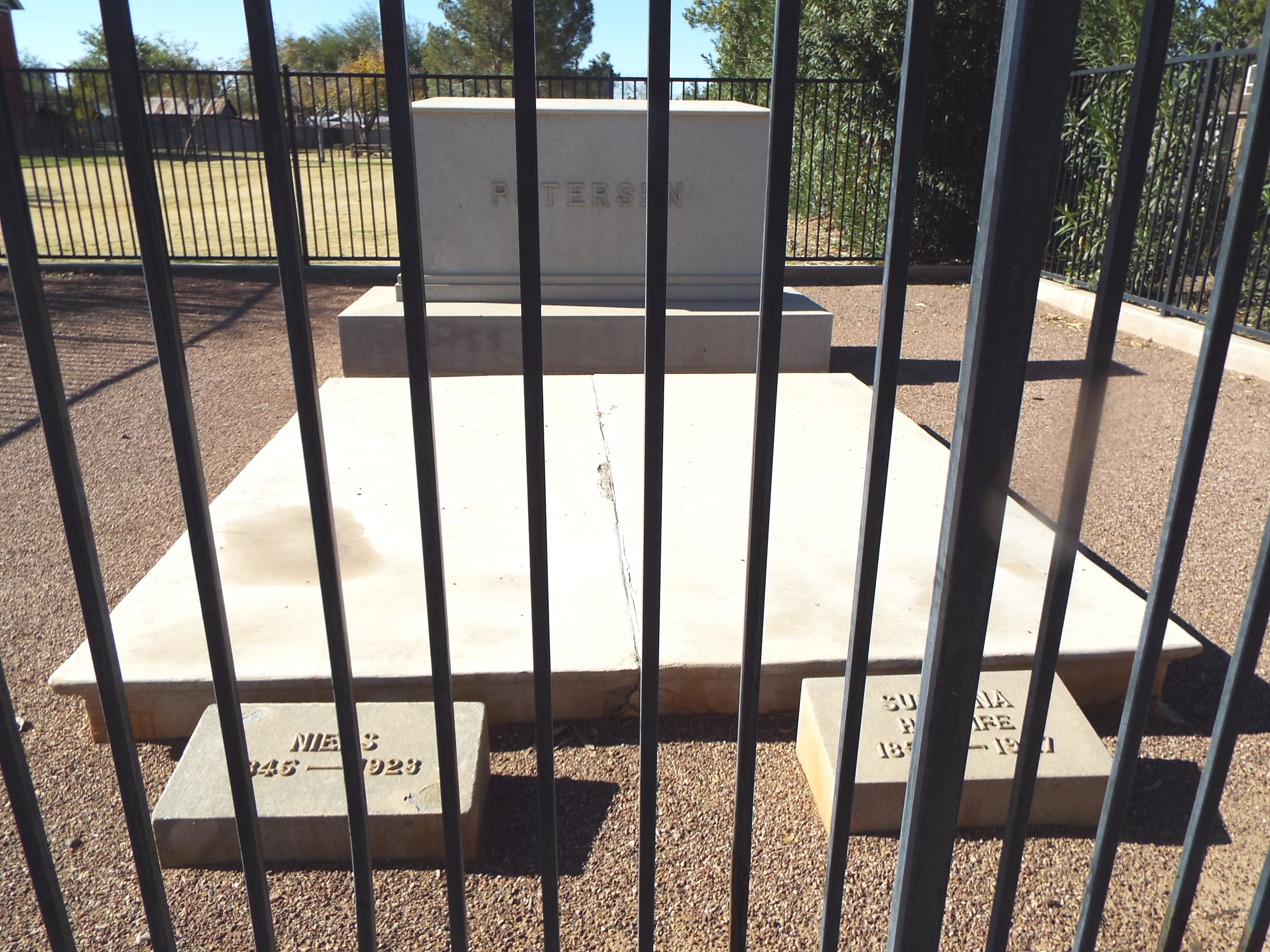
Graves of Niels and Susanna Petersen located within the property which they once owned.

The city has 45 listings on the National Register of Historic Places, which includes three historic neighborhood districts. Additionally, a number of properties not on the national register which are of historical interest to the city and which are included in the Tempe Historic Property Survey are also listed here. One of the main criteria of the National Register of Historic Places is that the property must be in its original location, otherwise it will be removed from the list. Two examples of properties which were listed and later dismantled to be rebuilt in another location are the Josephine Frankenberg House, which was originally located at 129 E. University Dr., and the Samuel C. Long House, which was originally located at 27 E. 6th St. Both houses are now located at 150 S. Ash Ave in Tempe's Olde Towne Square, along with three other houses considered as historical by the Tempe Historical Society.

The Tempe Historic Property Survey and the Tempe Historical Society are involved in identifying more than 350 buildings and structures in Tempe that exhibited potential historical and/or architectural significance. The Tempe Historic Preservation Office does not have the ability to deny a demolition permit. Therefore, the owner of a property listed either in the National Register of Historic Places or the Tempe Historic Property Survey may demolish the historical property. Two examples of the many properties which were listed in the Tempe Historic Property Survey and which have been demolished are The R. J. Schweppe House, which once was at 202 E. 5th Street, and the Johnson/McLean House at 108 W. University Dr.

Also pictured is the Double Butte Cemetery which was established in 1888 in property donated by Niels Peterson. Peterson himself was buried there until 1923, when he was exhumed and re-interred in the property where his historic house is located. The cemetery was listed in the National Register of Historic Places on July 23, 2013. Among the notable people buried in the cemetery are: Charles Trumbull Hayden, the founder of Tempe; his son Carl T. Hayden, the first United States Senator to serve seven terms; Benjamin Baker Moeur, the 4th Governor of Arizona; and John Howard Pyle, the 9th Governor of Arizona.

== Endangered properties ==
The Arizona Preservation Foundation is an agency which identifies critically endangered cultural resources of major historical significance to the state. In 2012, the foundation identified the following properties in Tempe as endangered:

- The Gonzales-Martinez House
- The Maple Ash Neighborhood
  - Efforts made at the Tempe Historic Preservation Foundation meeting in 2019 to stop urban expansion within the neighborhood. Many want to keep historic prevalence, while some want to reap the benefits of rising property values in area. There is still an ongoing effort to preserve Tempe's last remaining pre-World War II neighborhood.

== Buildings, Bridges and Houses of religious worship ==
The following are images with a brief description of Tempe's historic Buildings, Bridges and Houses of religious worship. They are considered historical by the National Register of Historic Places and/or the Tempe Historic Property Register.

- Hayden Flour Mill – originally built by Charles T. Hayden in 1874, thus the name "Mill Avenue" (THPR).
- Tempe Hardware Building – built in 1875. It is located at 520 S. Mill Ave.. It was added to the National Register of Historic Places in 1980. Reference number 80000767.
- The Andre Building – built in 1888 and located at 401-403 S. Mill Ave.. While living in Phoenix, R. G. Andre built the commercial building at the southwest corner of Mill and 4th Street in 1888, and opened a saddle and harness shop. It was listed in the National Register of Historic Places on August 10, 1979, reference #79000419.
- The Borden Milk Company a.k.a. Creamery and Ice Factory – built in 1892 and located in 1300-1360 E. 8th St. This particular buildings' address is 1300. It was listed in the National Register of Historic Places on October 10, 1984, reference #84000171.
- The Borden Milk Company – This particular buildings' address is 1340
- The Borden Milk Company – The particular address of these buildings' are 1350 and 1360.
- The historic Laird and Dines building – built in 1893. Both J. A. Dines and Hugh E. Laird served as mayors of Tempe and this building, which was once a drug store, served as Tempe's unofficial City Hall during their administrations.
- The Vienna Bakery Building – built in 1893 located at 415 S. Mill Avenue. The Vienna Bakery Building was built in the Victorian commercial style, was modernized in 1928, to the Spanish Colonial Revival style that was popular at the time. The building is associated with a German immigrant family which carried on a bakery business in this location from 1904 until 1963. Listed in the National Register of Historic Places on June 30, 1980, references #80000764.
- The St. Mary's Church – Our Lady of Mount Carmel Catholic Church – built in 1903.
- The Goodwin Building – built in 1907 and located 514-518 S. Mill Ave. In 1907, Garfield Abram Goodwin completed his building with three commercial bays ─ two rentals and one for his curio store and Wells Fargo Agency. The back of half of the store was furnished as a home for the Goodwin family. The restored Goodwin building remains as the last example of cast-iron façade architecture in Tempe. Goodwin served as mayor of Tempe from 1924 to 1926. On May 6, 1984, the National Park Service (National Register of Historic Places) certified Goodwin Building as a national historic site, and assigned it the reference number 84000710.
- The Southern Pacific Railroad Bridge – The bridge over Tempe Lake was built in 1912. Listed in the National Register of Historic Places in 1985 as the Salt River Southern Pacific RR Bridge, reference #85003546.
- The Wooden Trestles of the 1912 Southern Pacific Bridge over Tempe Lake.
- Tempe National Bank Building – built in 1912. The Tempe National Bank was established on January 4, 1901, by pioneer Tempe businessmen and agriculturalists. From its establishment in 1901, the bank operated under the control and direction of the community's most intrepid pioneers., including: Carl T. Hayden, Arizona's longtime Congressman and Senator; Cyrus Grant Jones, first president of the Tempe National Bank; and Albert E. Miller, son of Tempe pioneer Winchester Miller, a director of the Tempe Irrigating Canal Company. Thanks Anderson, Mayor of Tempe from 1930‐1932 and 1934‐1937, began his banking career here in 1915 and went on to become branch manager and then vice‐president of the bank. Benjamin Baker Moeur, a physician and businessman in Tempe who served two terms as Governor of Arizona, had his practice in the building.
- Ruins of the Old 1913 Ash Avenue Bridge – The bridge was built with a narrow span which was designed more for wagons and couldn't handle two lanes of traffic. bridge closed to vehicles when the Mill Avenue Bridge opened in 1931. The bridge needed repairs, however the city of Tempe decided to demolish it in 1991.
- The Old 1913 Ash Avenue Bridge – as it looked in 2014. The old Ash Avenue Bridge segment is the first part of a roughly $2 million memorial that Tempe and the Rio Salado Foundation broke ground in November 2011, in honor of Veterans Day.
- Crosscut Canal Marker – Located in Moeur Park.
- The Crosscut Canal Power Plant – built in 1914 and located in the northwest corner of Mill Ave. and west of Washington Ave. The plant is considered eligible to be included in the National Register of Historic Places.
- The E.M. White Dairy Barn – built in 1919 and located at 1810 E. Apache Blvd. in Tempe, Az. The White Dairy Barn is the only known river cobble building remaining in Tempe, and was built around 1918 to 1920 by E.M. White, after he bought the property from M.H. Meyer and J.H. Guyer. Listed in the National Register of Historic Places on October 10, 1984, reference #84000176.
- The Watson's Flowers Building – built in 1920 and located at 2525 E. Apache Blvd. The building is an example of adobe commercial construction and the Art Modern style. It is historically associated to Tempe's transportation and tourism. The property is listed in the Tempe Historic Property Register.
- Marlatt's Garage – built in 1922 and located at 1249 E. 8th St.. The property was built by Clyde Gililland. Here he established his Gililland Motor Co. Garage business. Gililland served as Tempe's mayor for one year (1960–1961). Eugene Marlatt owned the property from 1933 until his death in 1981. The property is listed in the Tempe Historic Property Register.
- The Tempe Train Depot – built in 1924 by the Arizona Eastern Railroad and changed to Southern Pacific Railroad in 1925. It is located at 3rd Street and Ash Avenue. Listed in the National Register of Historic Places in 1985 reference #85003551.
- The Tempe Beach Stadium – The baseball field was built in 1927, and the cobblestone wall which was built around the park in 1934. The Tempe Beach Stadium is located in the corner of 1st St. and Ash Ave. The property was listed in the National Register of Historic Places on January 7, 1985.
- The Cobblestone – The "Wall" was built in 1934 around the Tempe Beach Stadium baseball field.
- Mill Ave. Bridge – built in 1931. The bridge was added to the National Register of Historic Places in 1981, reference number #81000137.
- The College Theatre – built in 1933 and located at 505-509 S. Mill Ave.. The theatre, now named the Valley Art Theatre, is Arizona's oldest and longest operating movie theatre. Designed and constructed by Red Harkins at the age of 25. Listed in the Tempe Historic Property Register.
- Entrance to Moeur Park – The park was established in 1933 and is located on Mill Ave. The park was named after Dr. Benjamin B. Moeur who served two terms as governor of Arizona. The park was established by the Works Project Administration as an automobile rest stop for motorists. Field stone were used to make the tables and benches.
- The Tempe Woman's Club – built in 1936 and located at 1290 S. Mill Ave. The building was listed in the National Register of Historic Places on May 11, 2000, reference number 00000461.
- The First Congregational Church – built in 1948. The First Congregational Church is significant, as a landmark, for its presence in Downtown Tempe since 1899.
- The New Mill Avenue Bridge – The bridge opened in 1994. It one of two bridges that cross the Salt River in Tempe.
- Construction of the new Tempe Lake Dam in 2016.
Historic buildings, bridges and houses of religious worship
(NRHP = National Register of Historic Places)
(THPR = Tempe Historic Property Register)
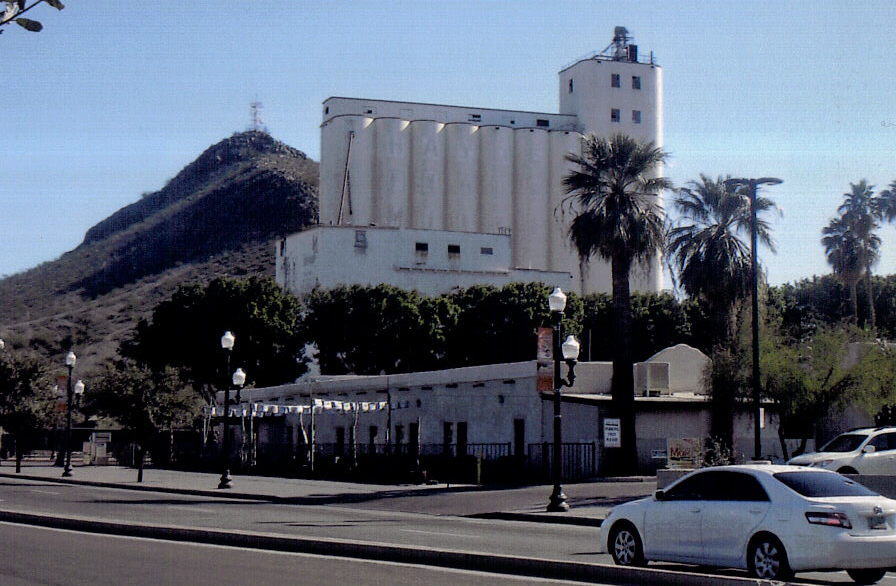
Hayden Flour Mill.

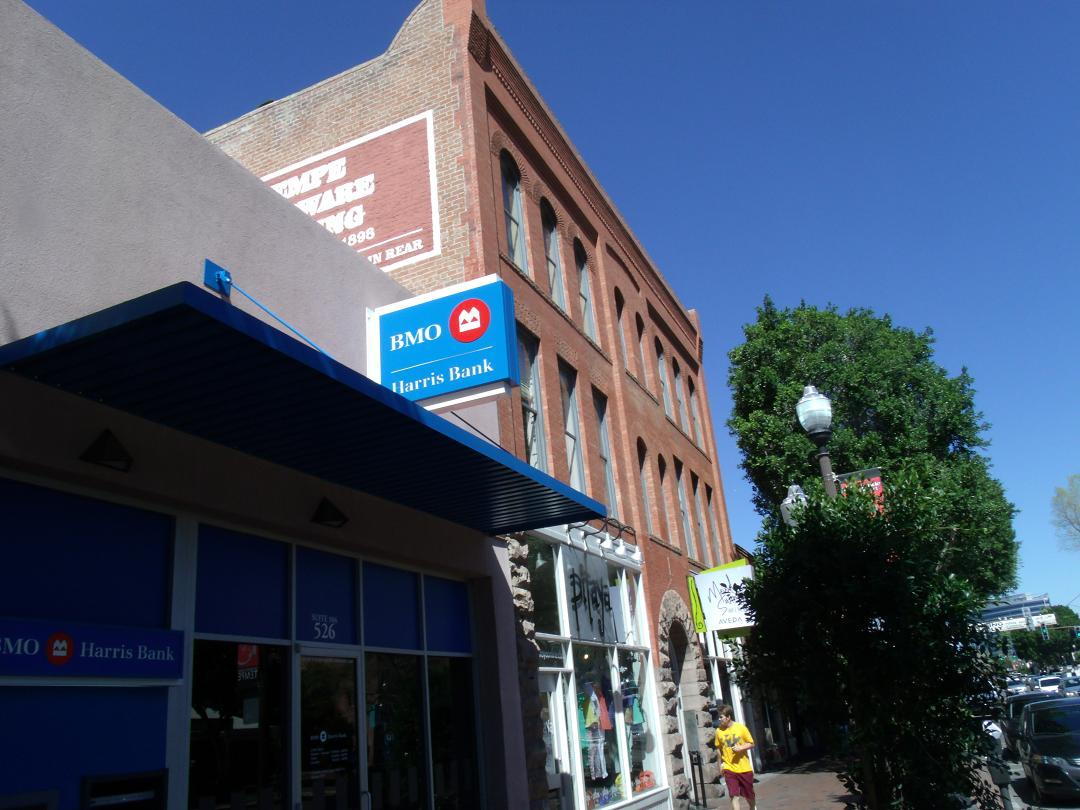
Tempe Hardware Building.

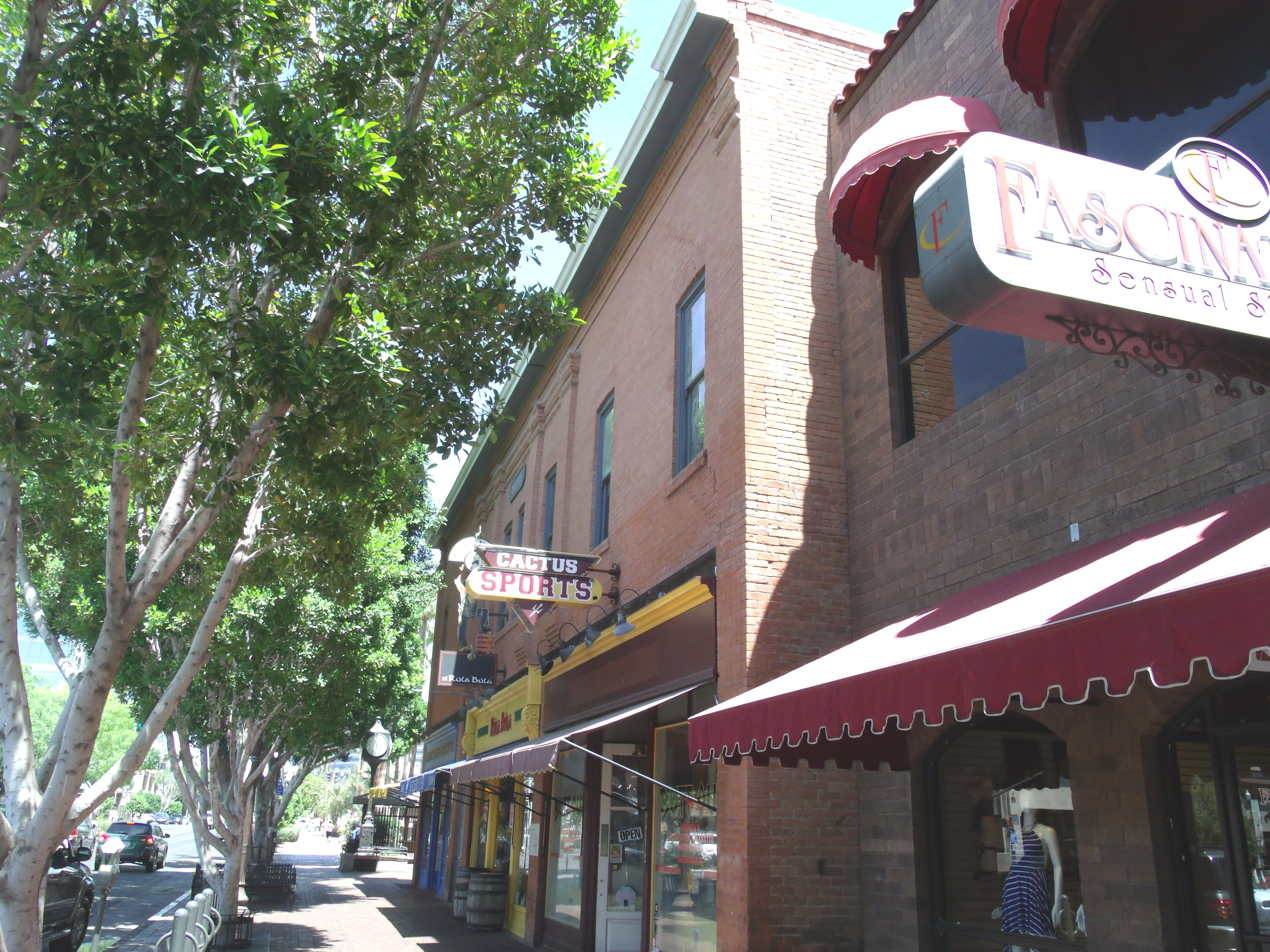
The Andre Building.

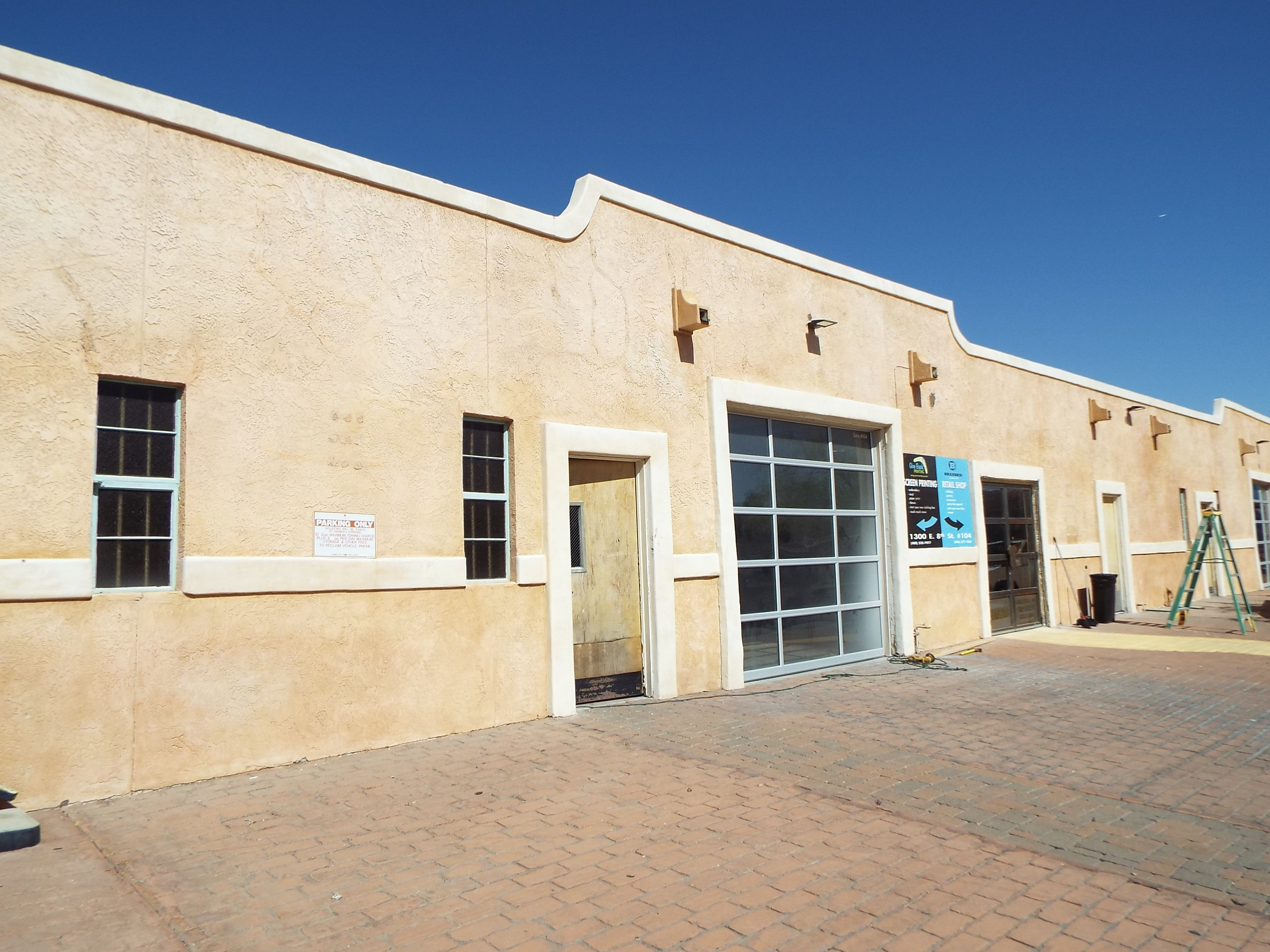
The Borden Milk Company, a.k.a. Creamery and Ice Factory . This particular buildings' address is 1300.

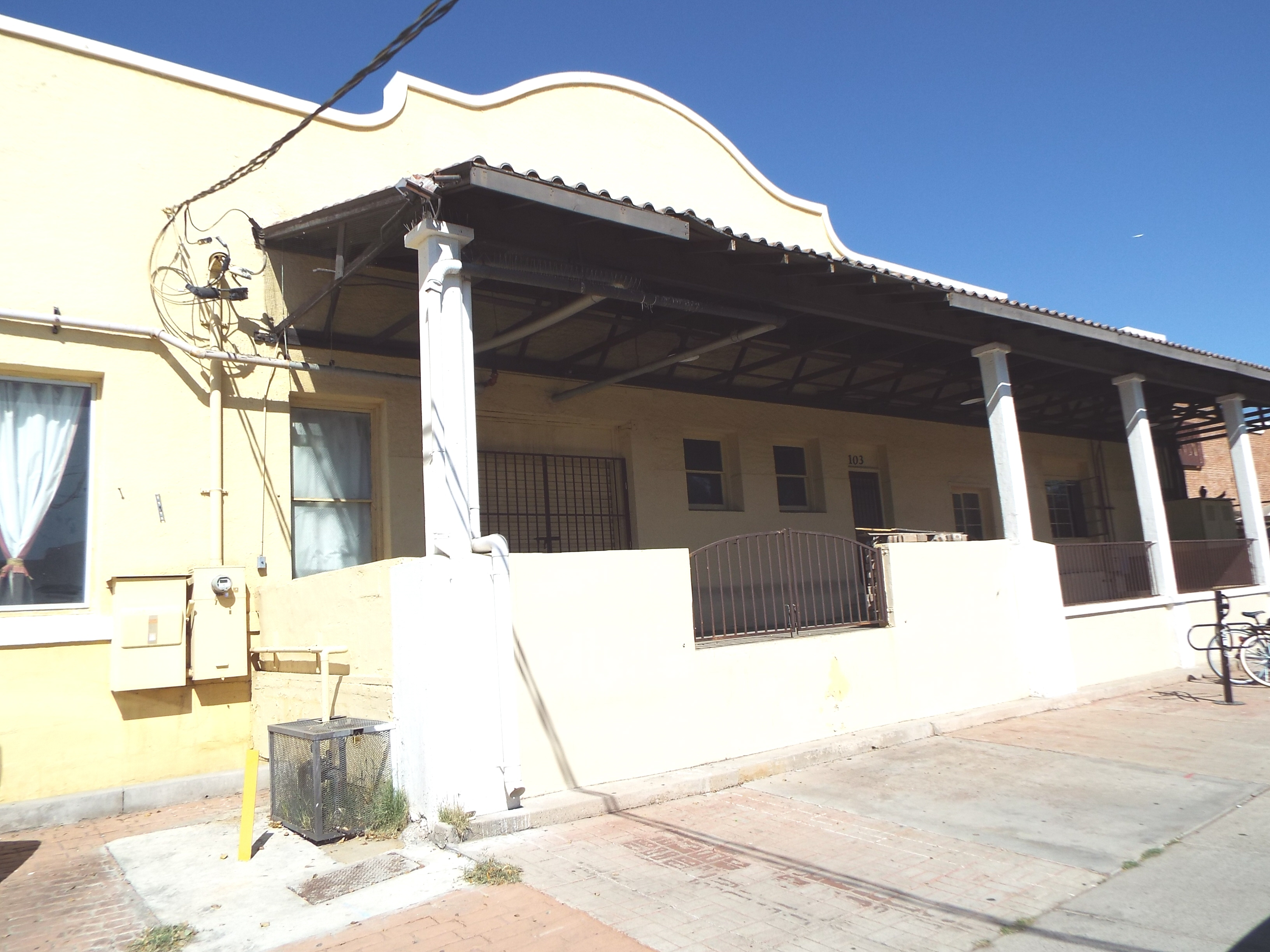
The Borden Milk Company . This particular buildings' address is 1340.

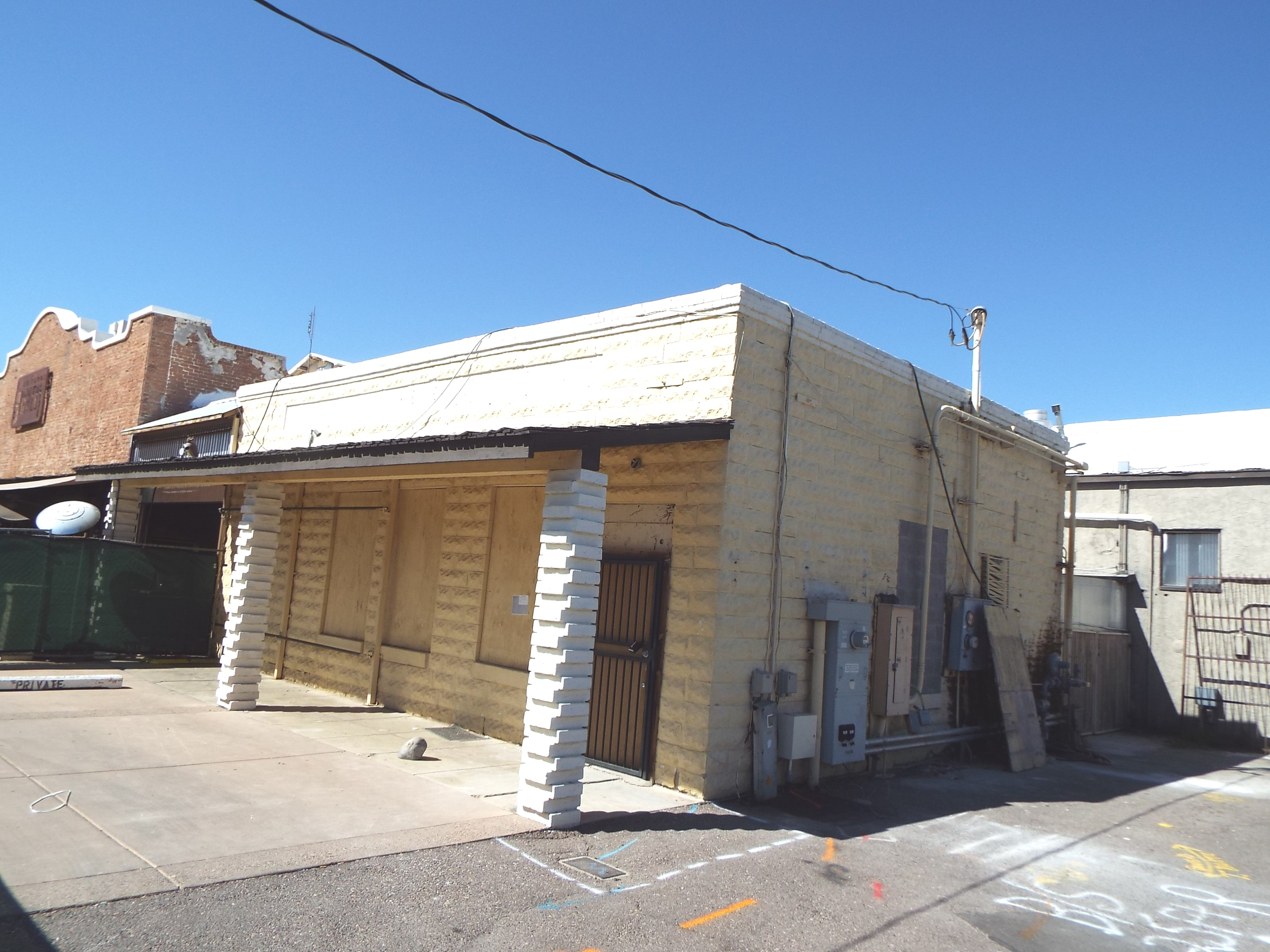
The Borden Milk Company . The particular address of these buildings' are 1350 and 1360.

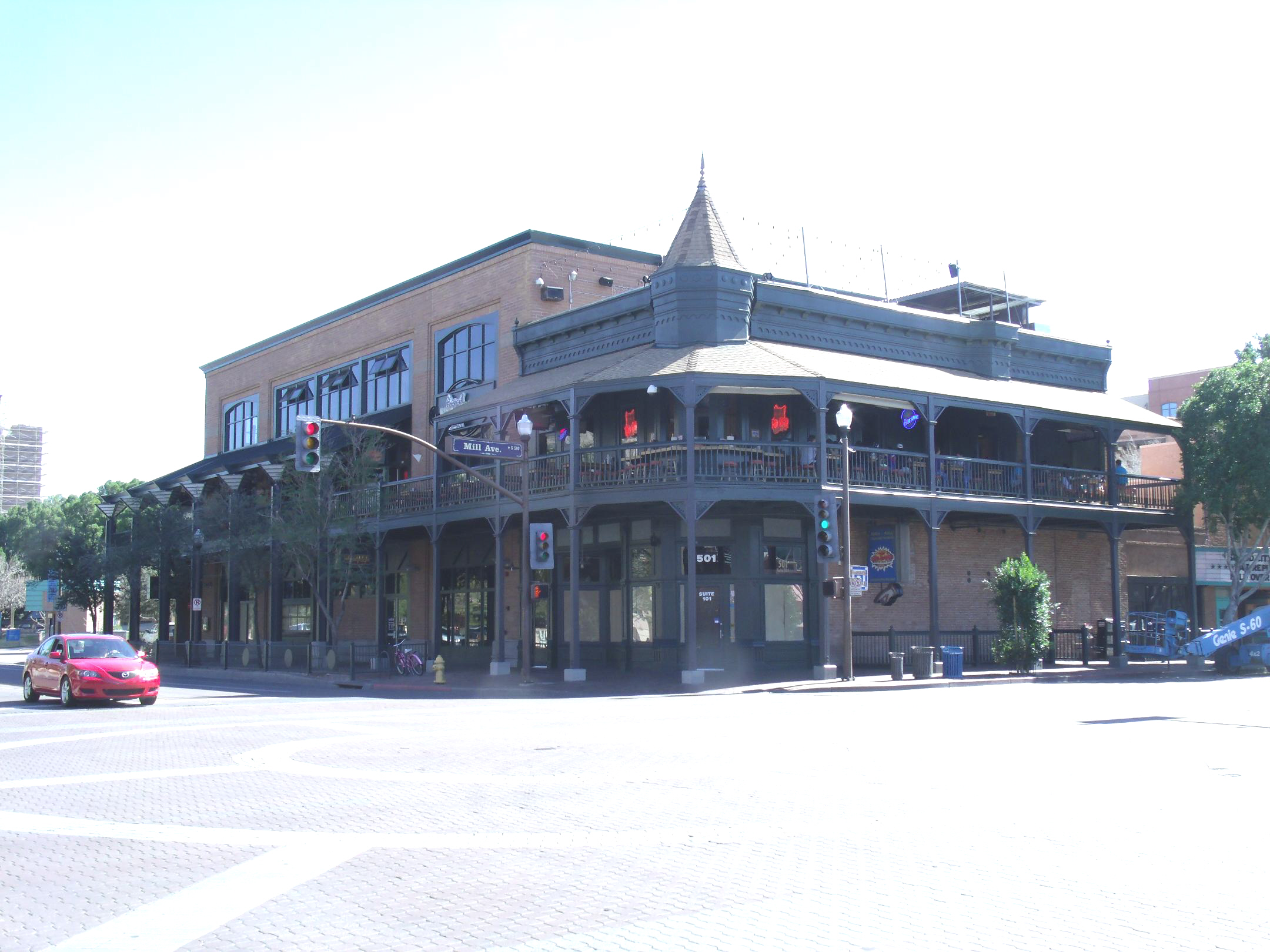
The Laird and Dines building.

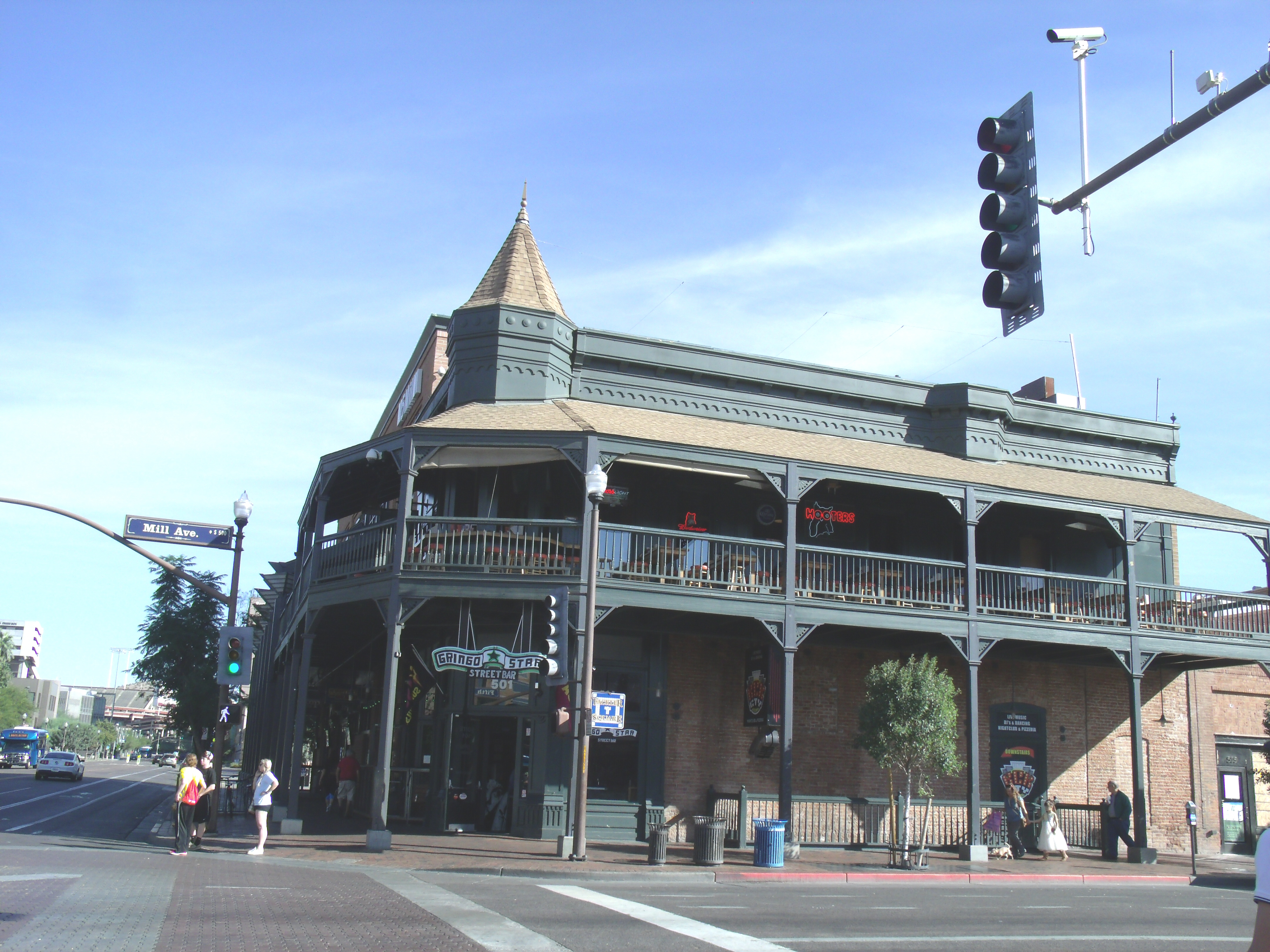
Different view of the Laird and Dines Building .

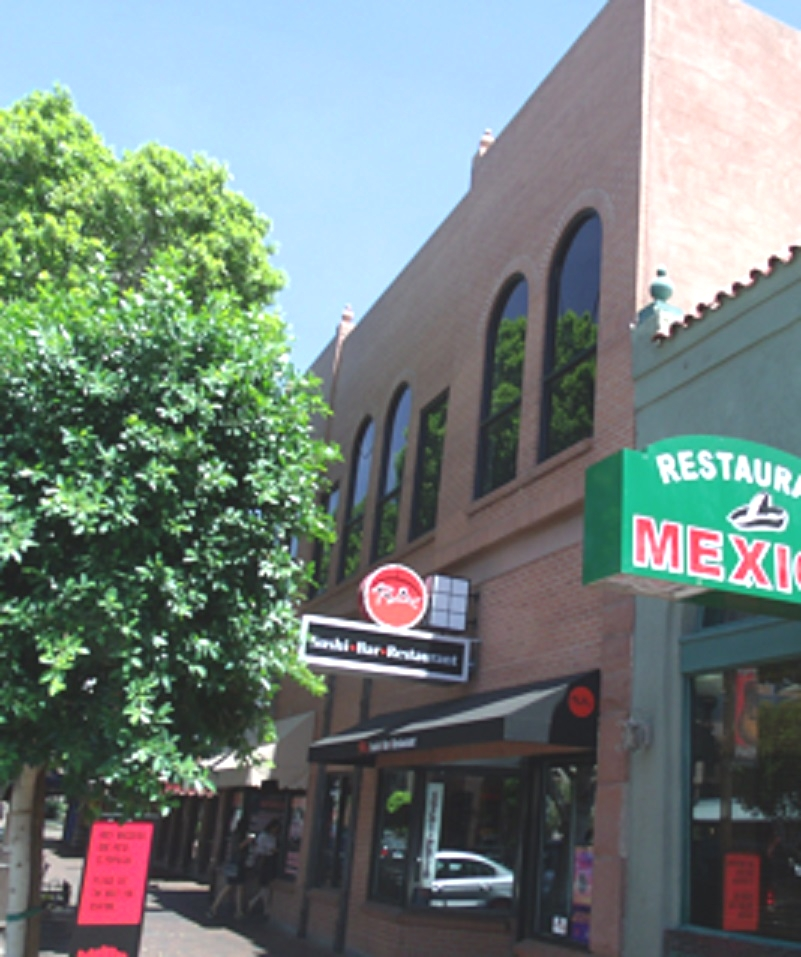
The Vienna Bakery Building.

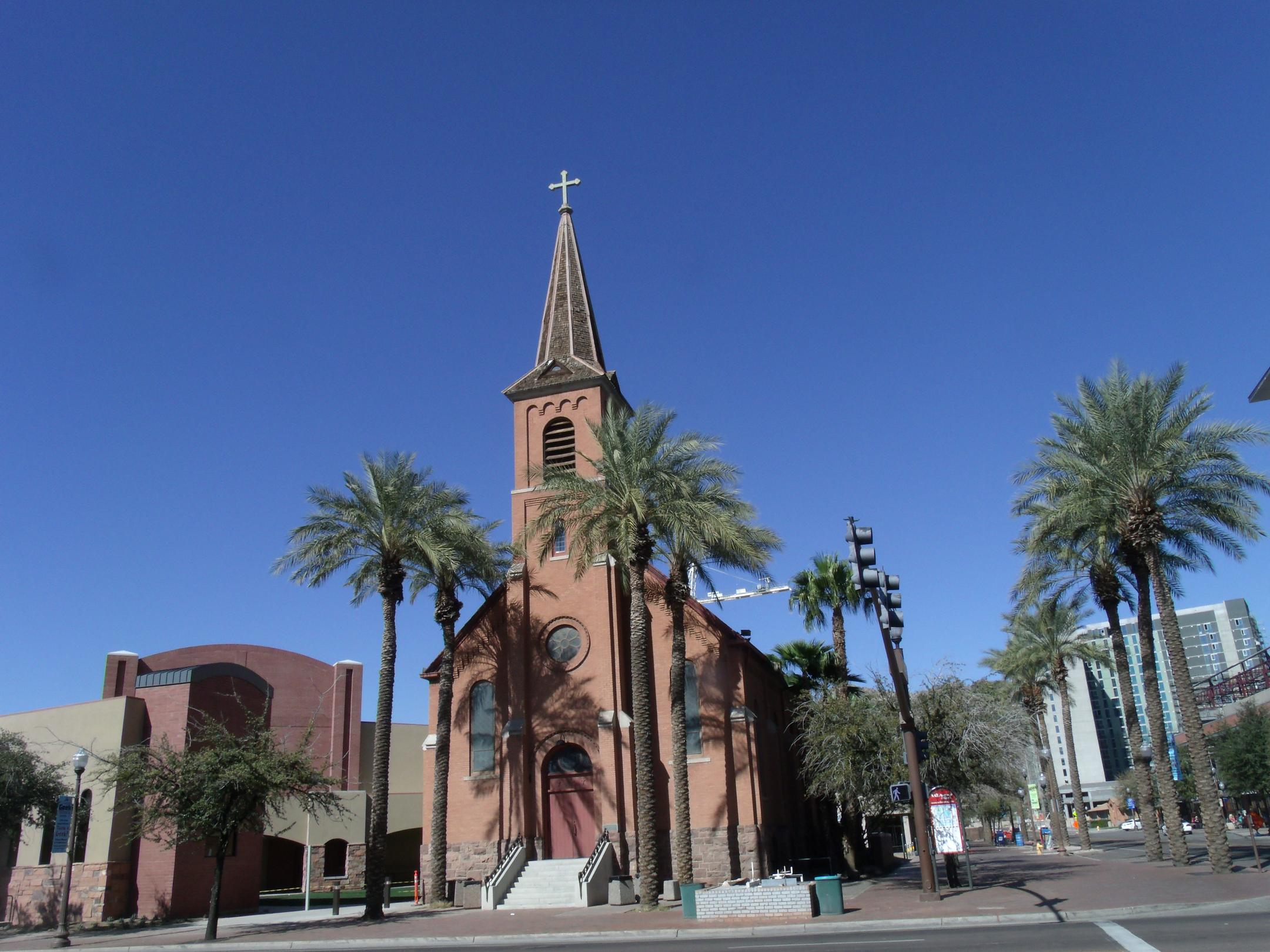
The St. Mary's Church – Our Lady of Mount Carmel Catholic Church.

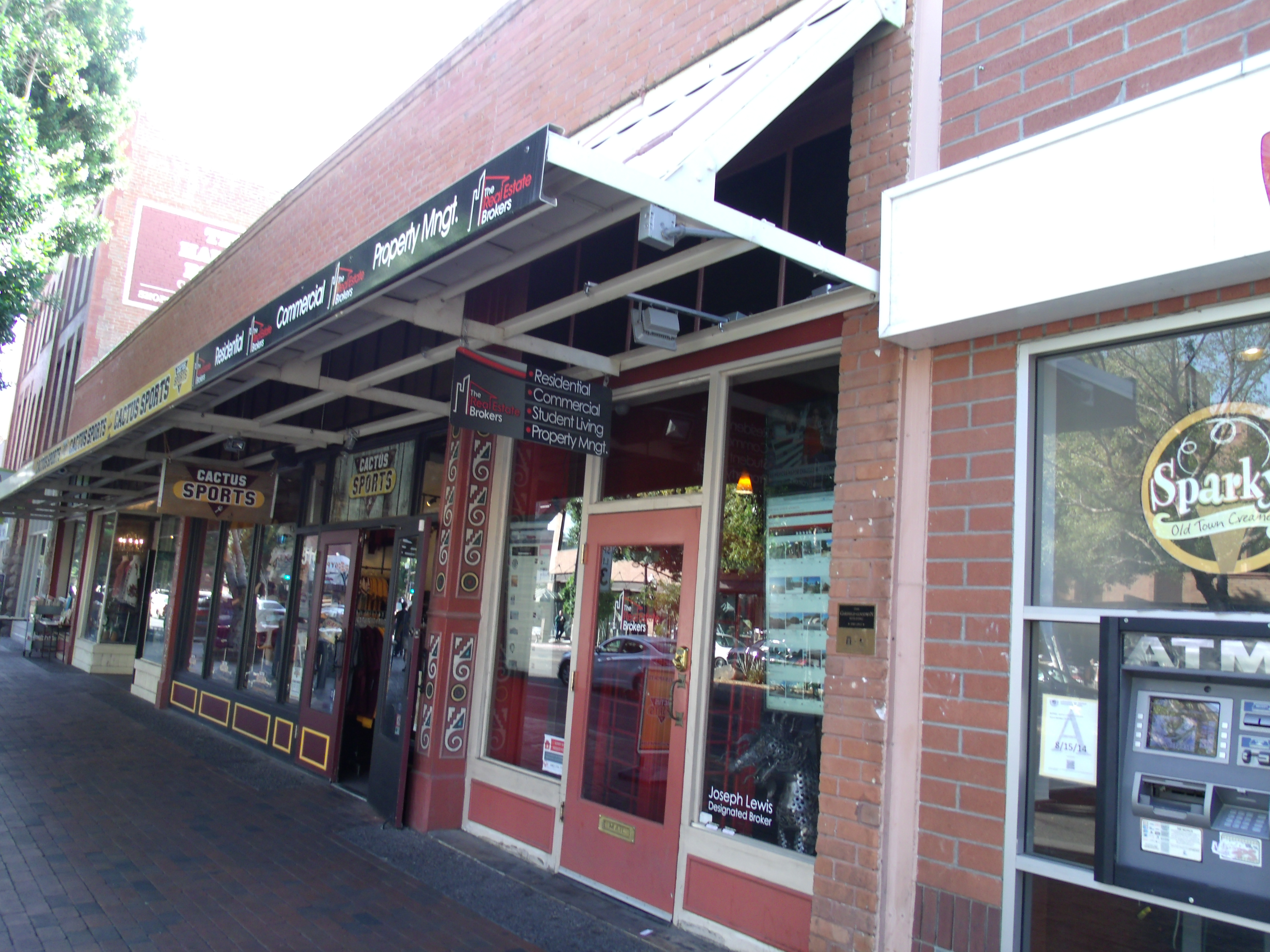
The Goodwin Building.

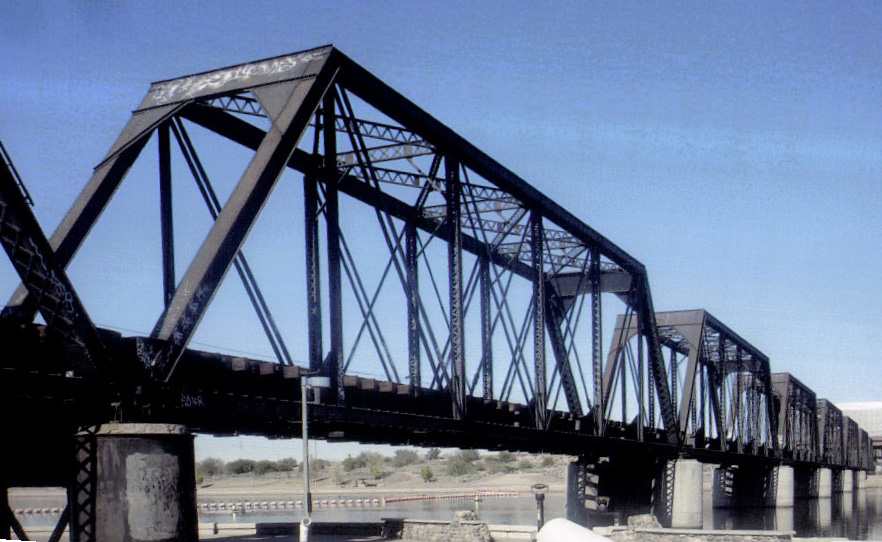
The Southern Pacific Railroad Bridge.

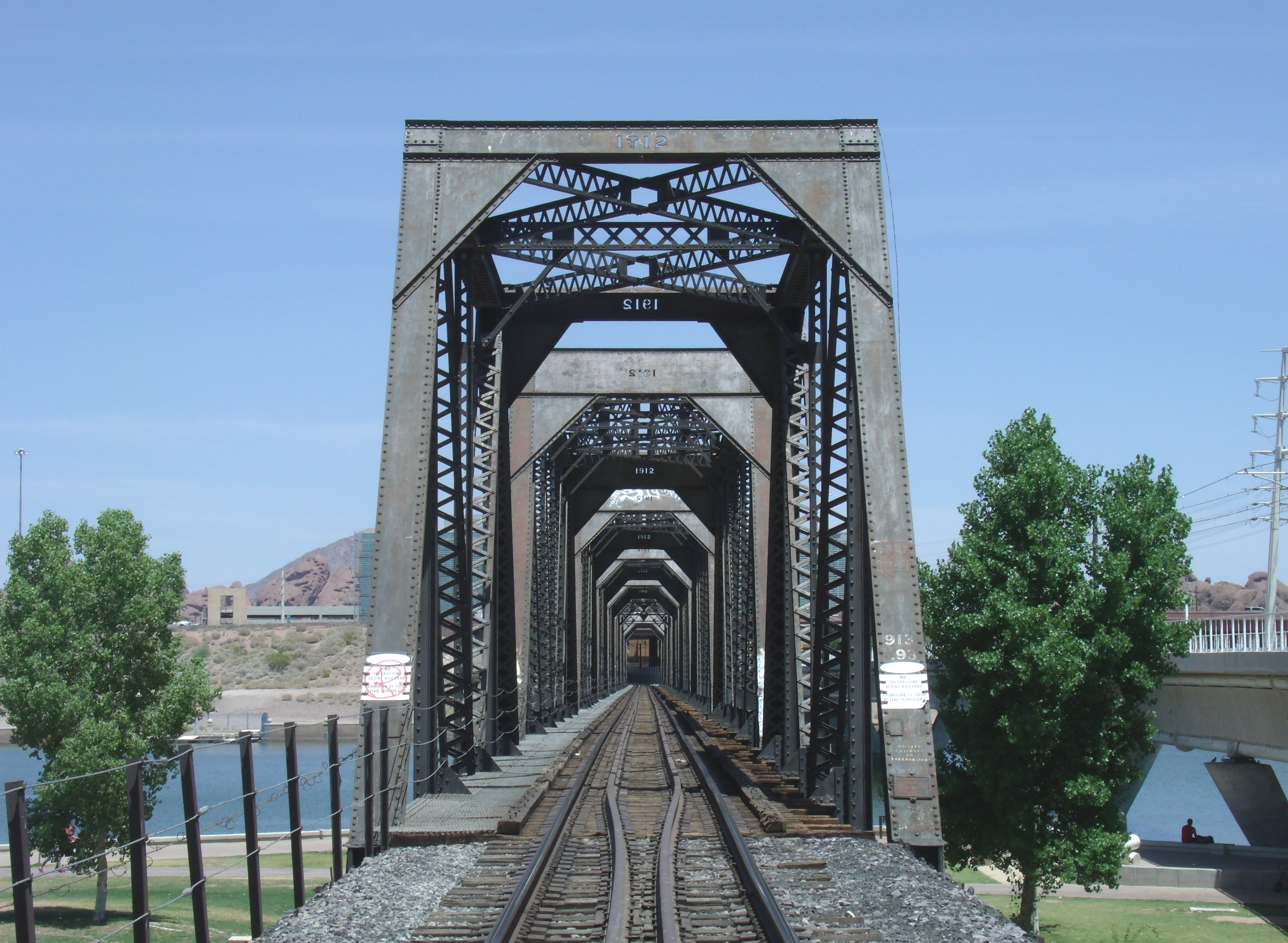
Different view of the 1912 Southern Pacific Railroad Bridge.

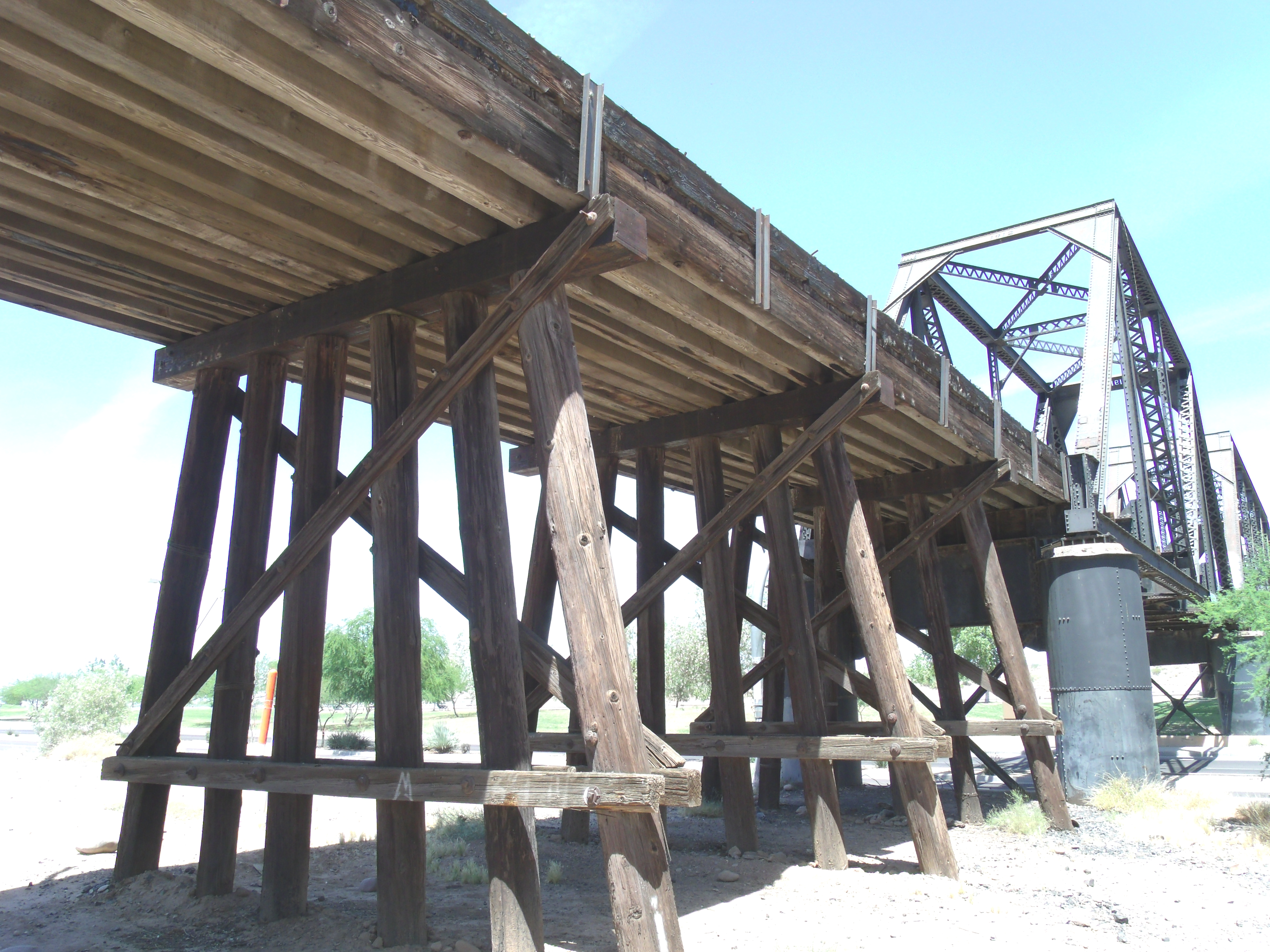
The Wooden Trestles of the 1912 Southern Pacific Bridge.

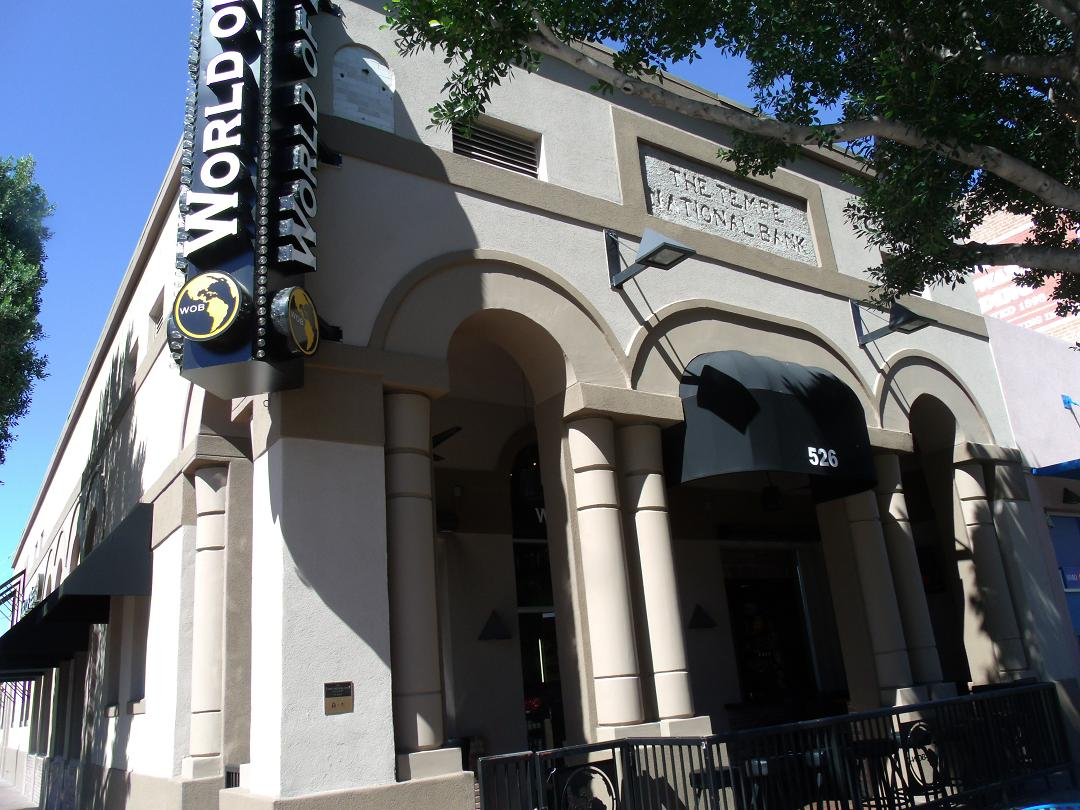
Tempe National Bank Building.

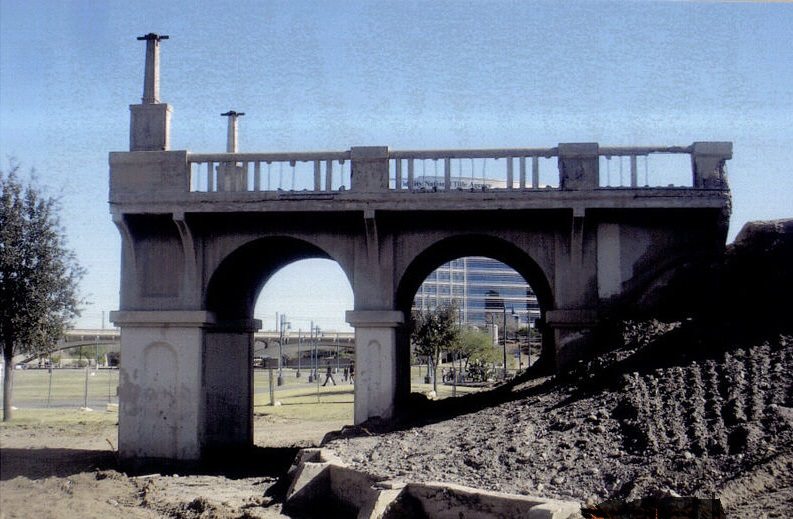
Ruins of the Old 1913 Ash Avenue Bridge.

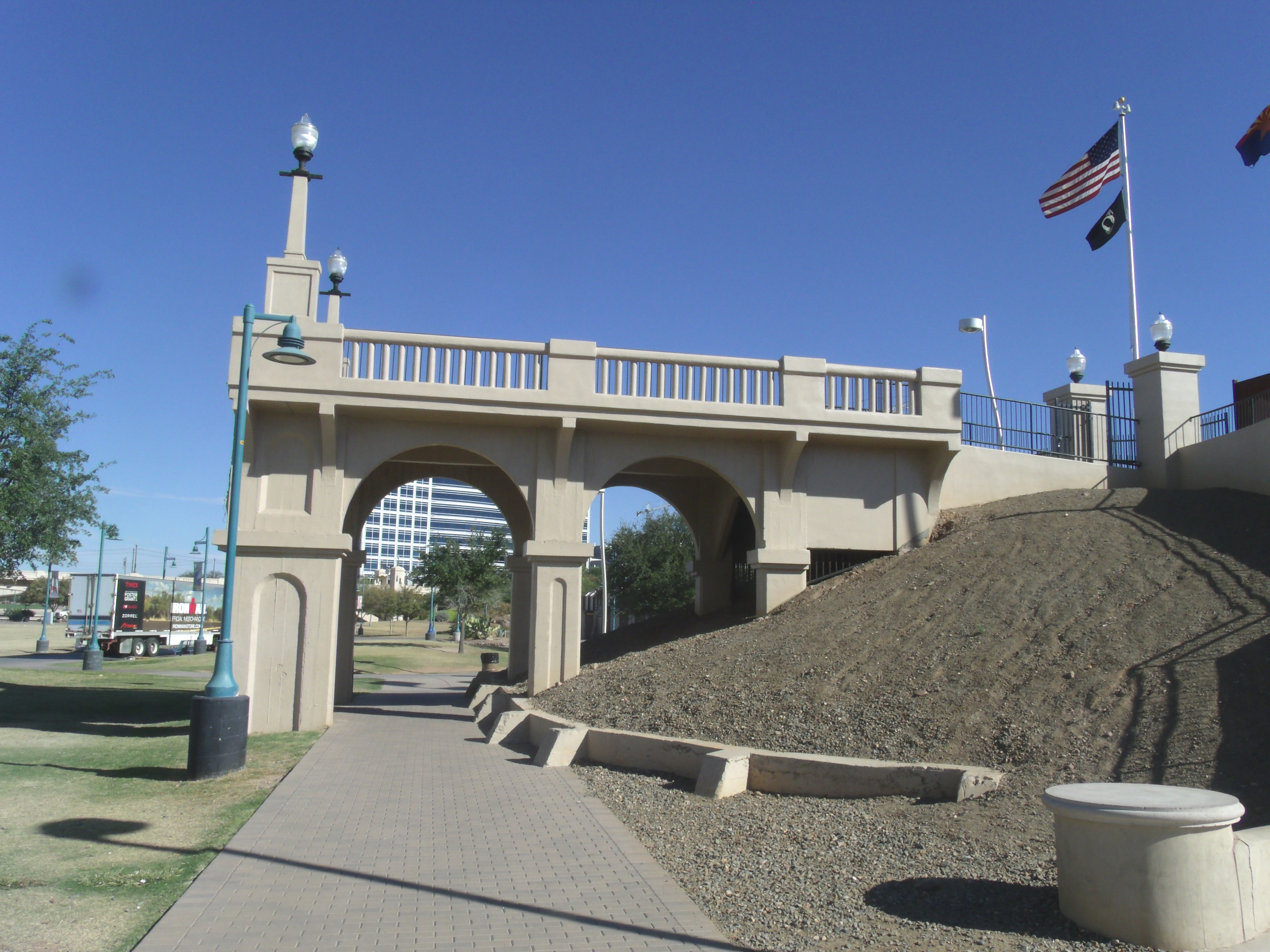
The Old 1913 Ash Avenue Bridge as it looked in 2014.

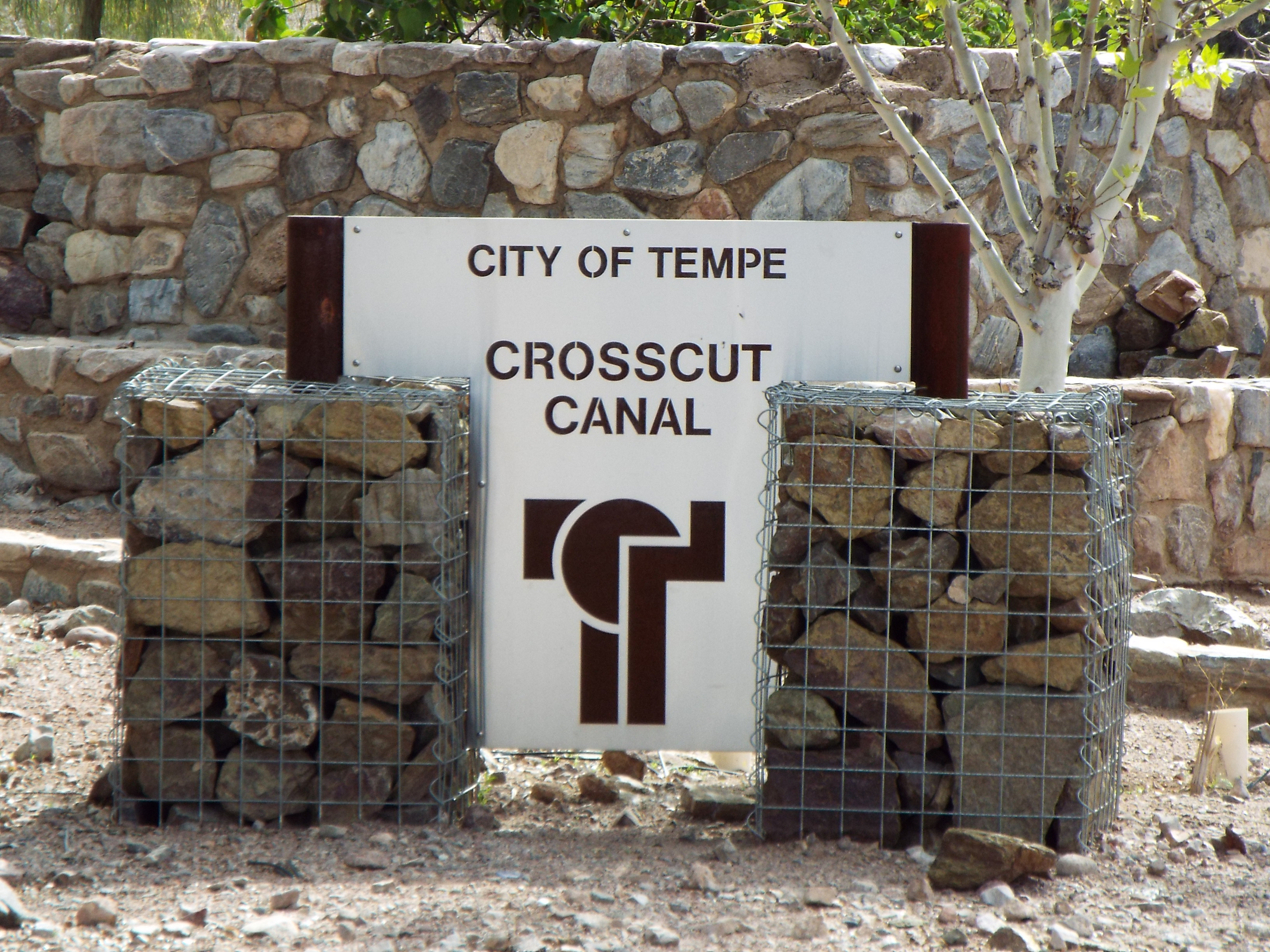
Crosscut Canal Marker in Moeur Park.

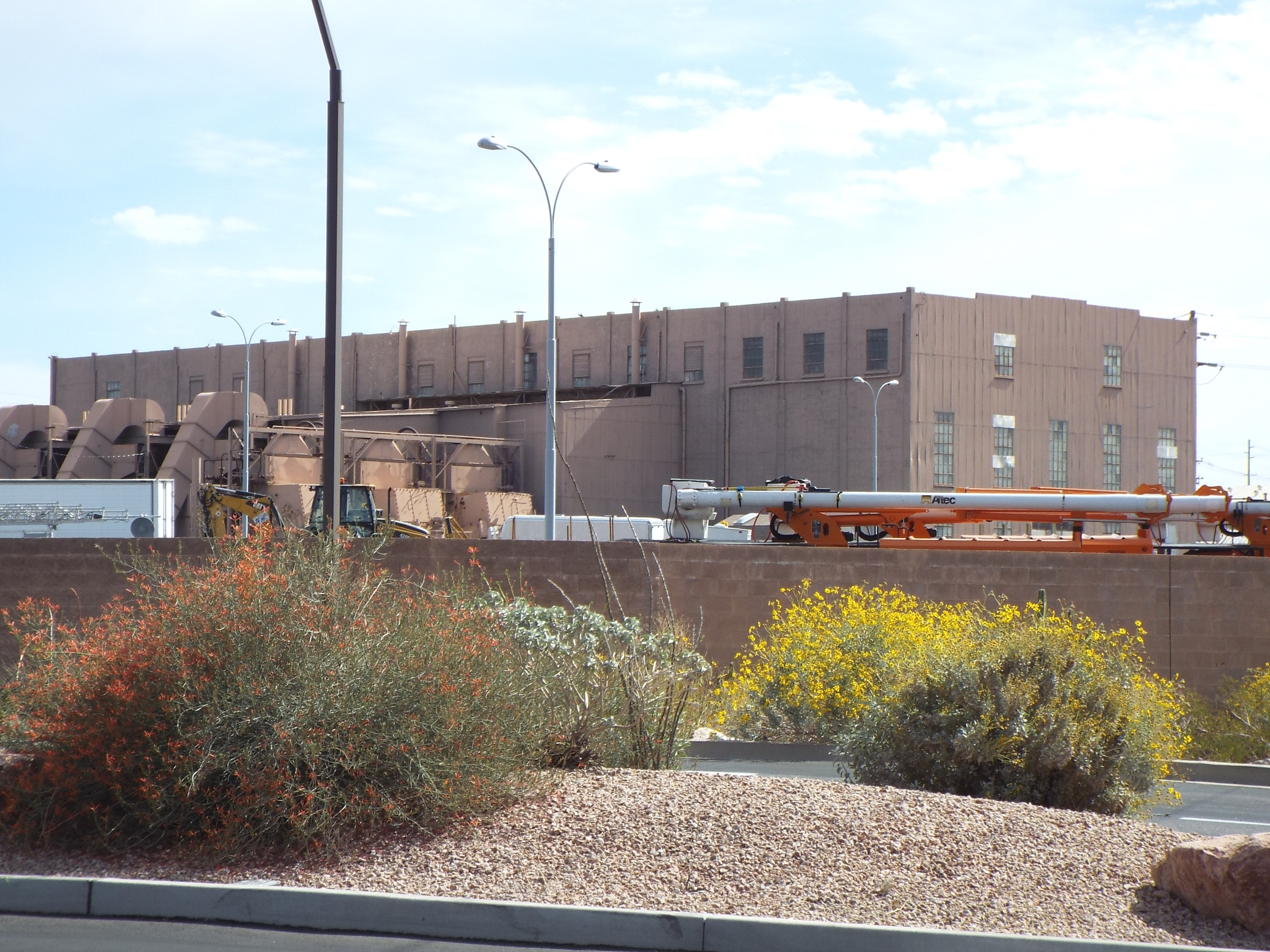
The Crosscut Canal Power Plant.

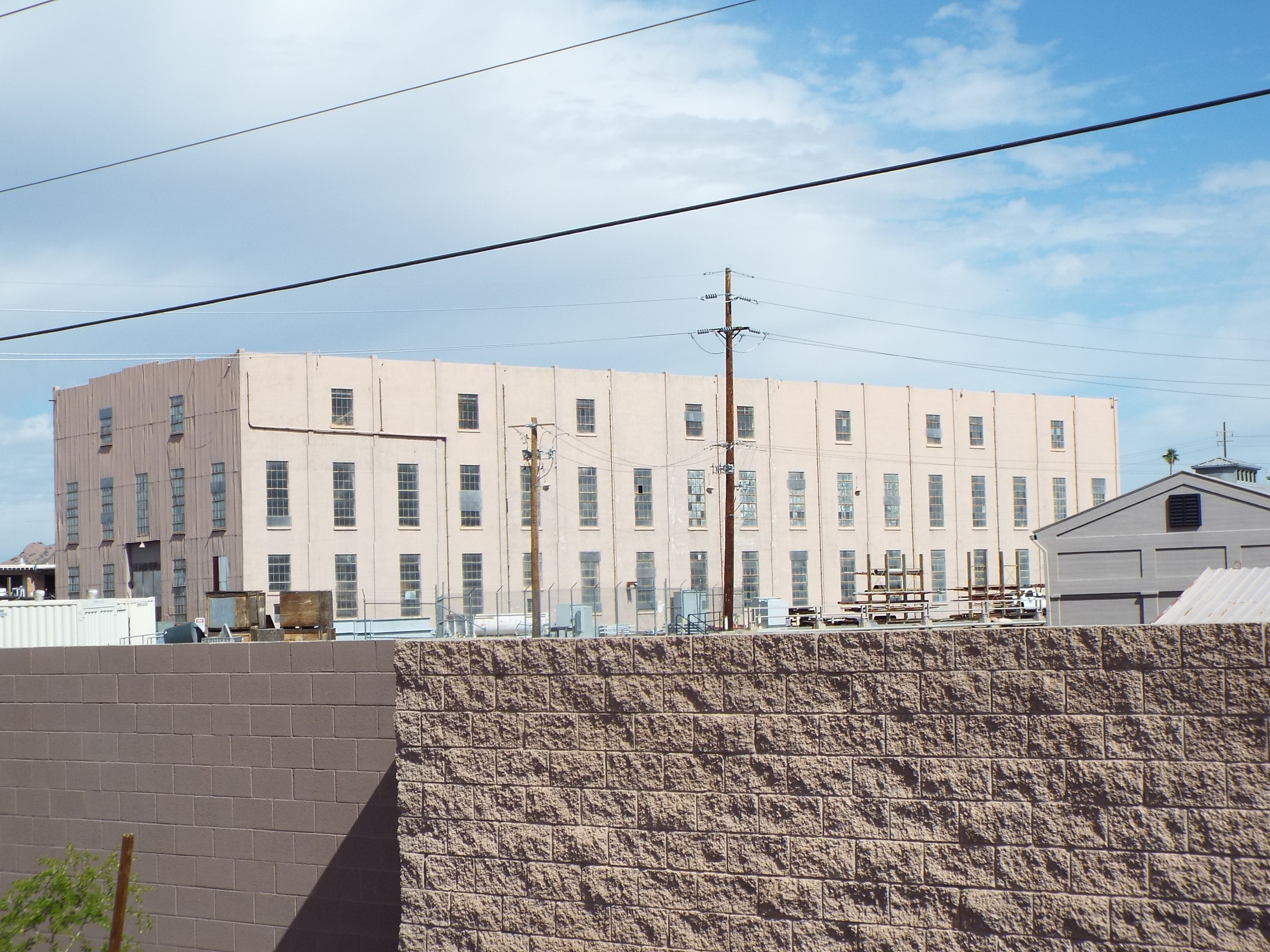
Back view of the Crosscut Canal Power Plant.

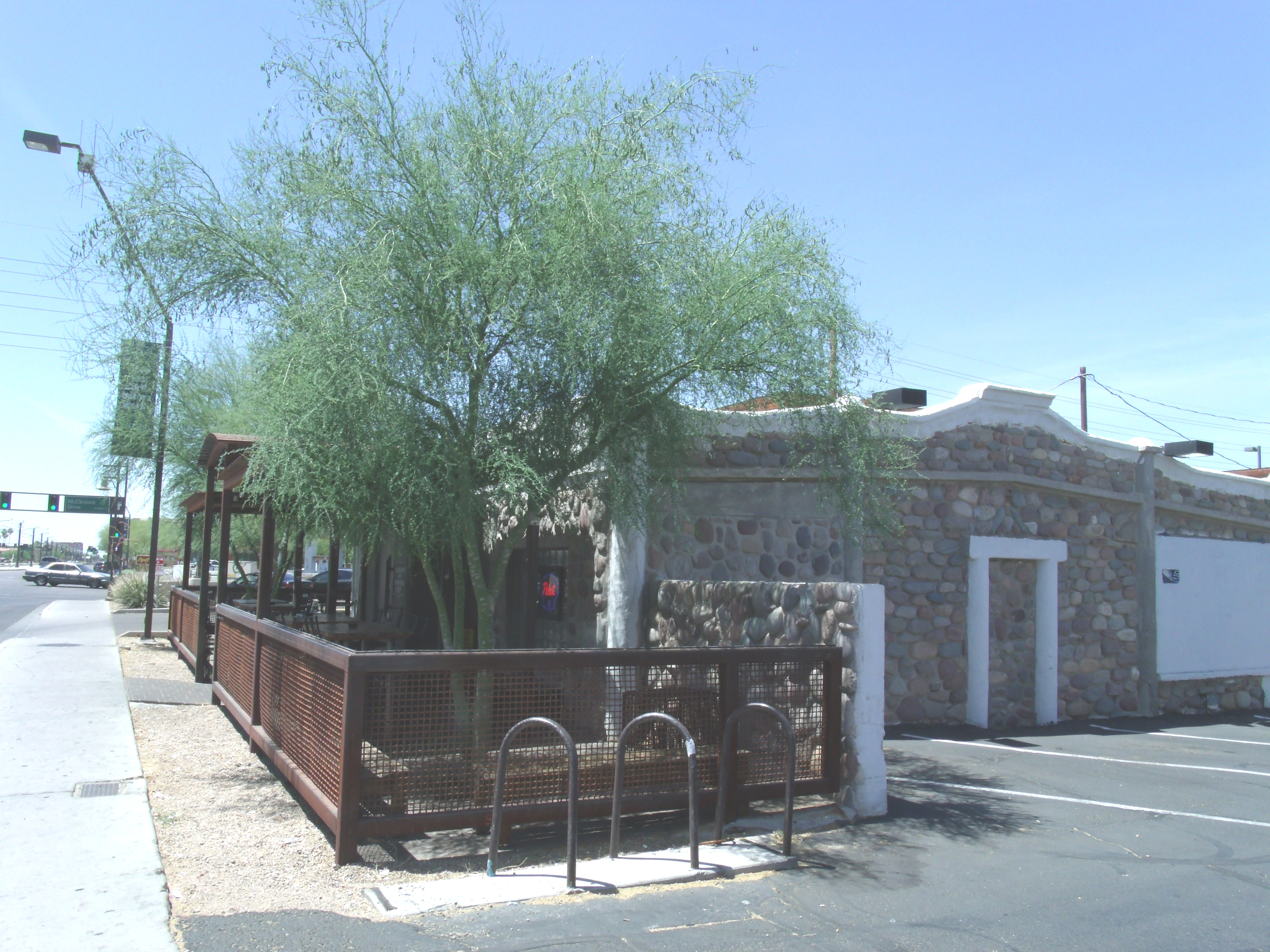
The E.M. White Dairy Barn.

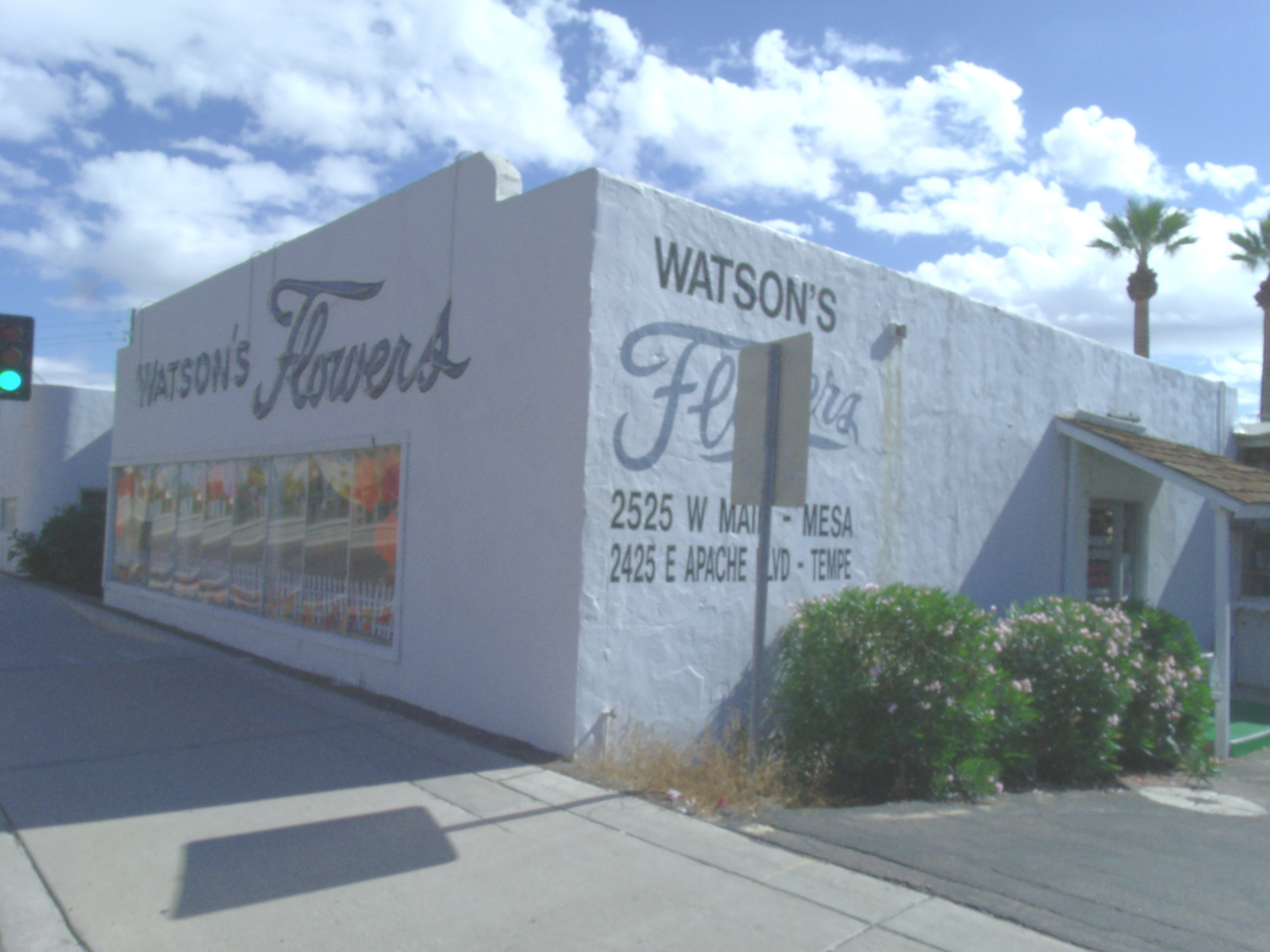
The Watson’s Flowers Building .

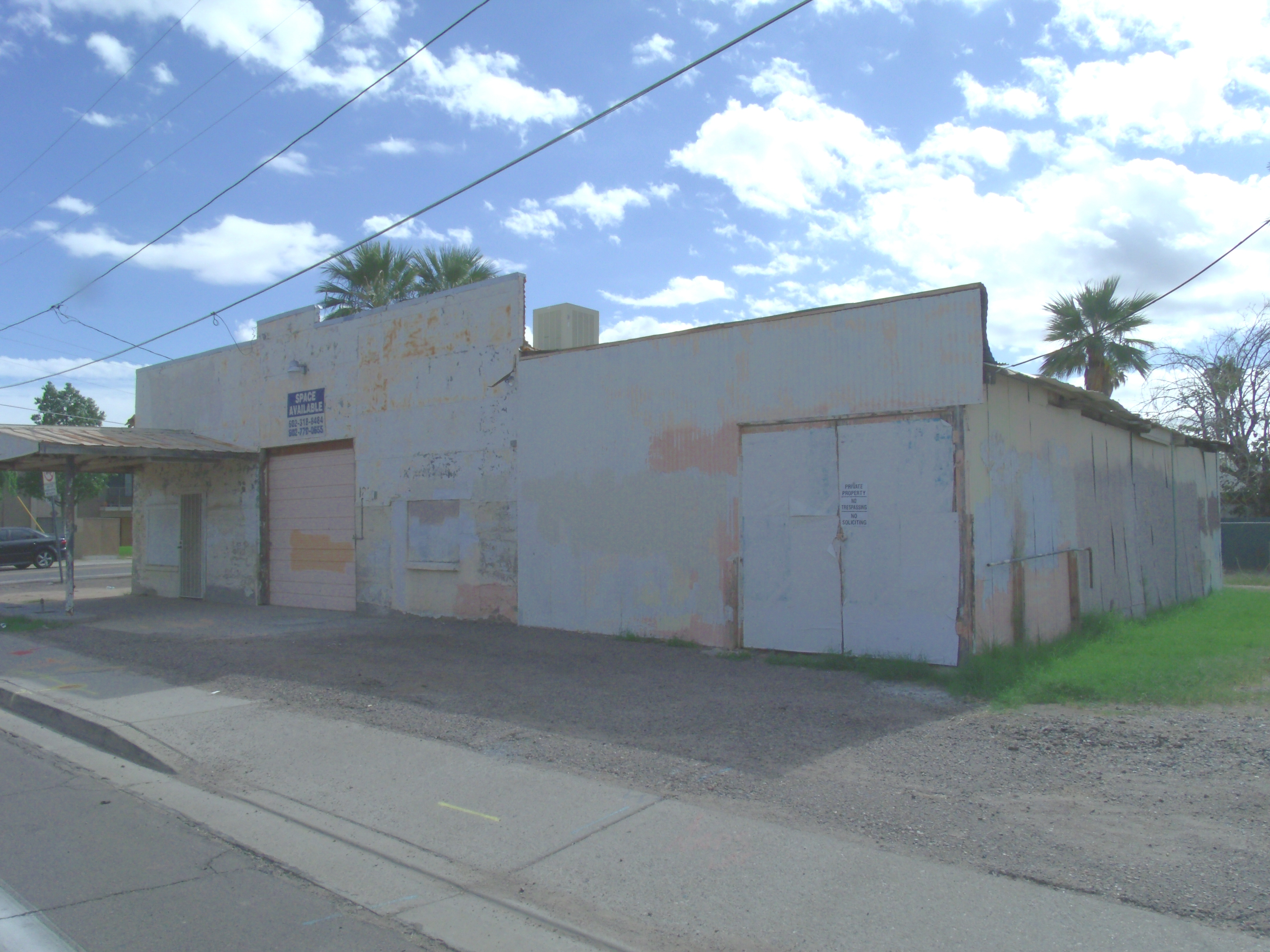
Marlatt’s Garage .

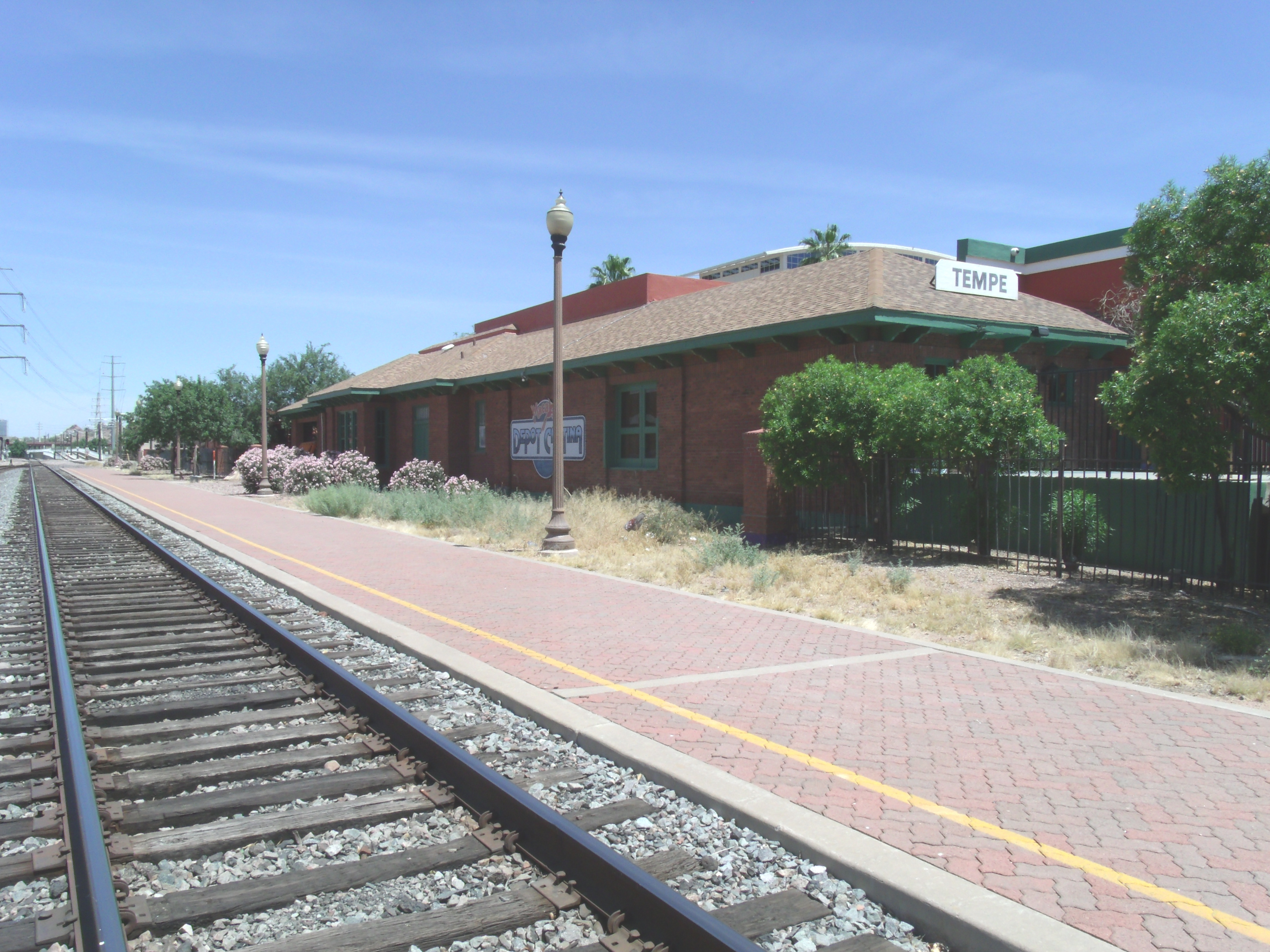
The Tempe Train Depot.

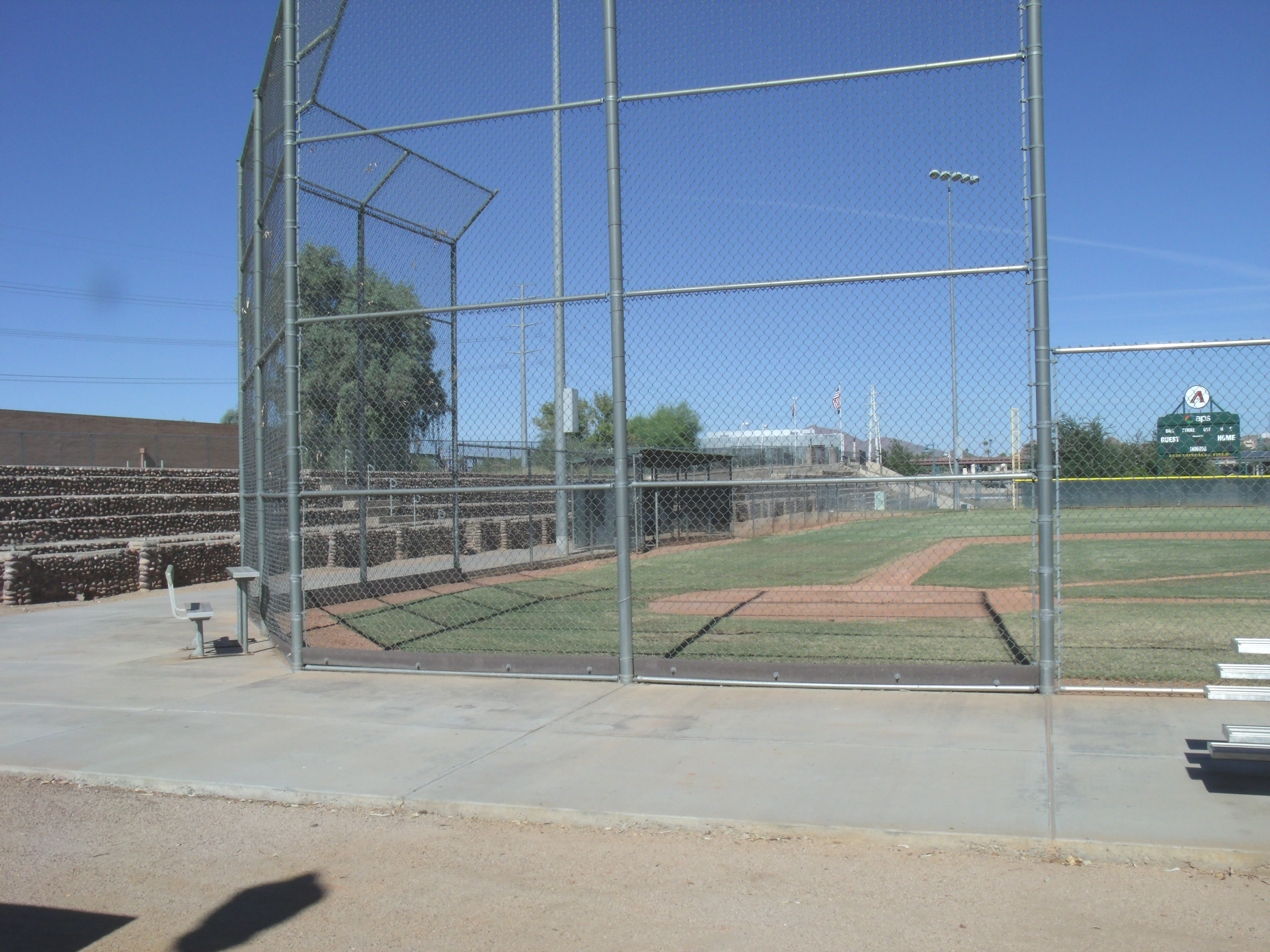
The Tempe Beach Stadium.

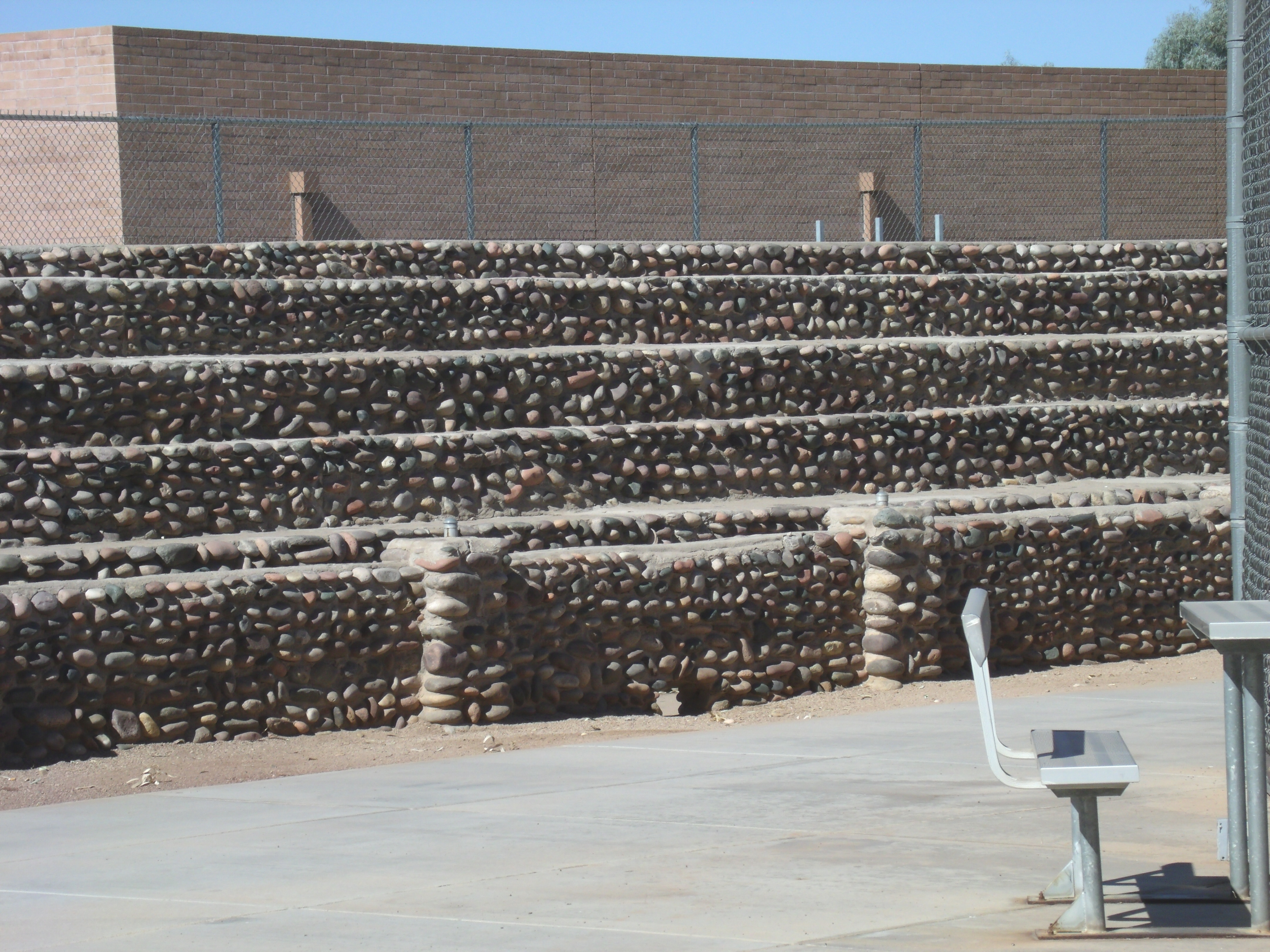
The Cobblestone Wall around the Tempe Beach Stadium baseball field.

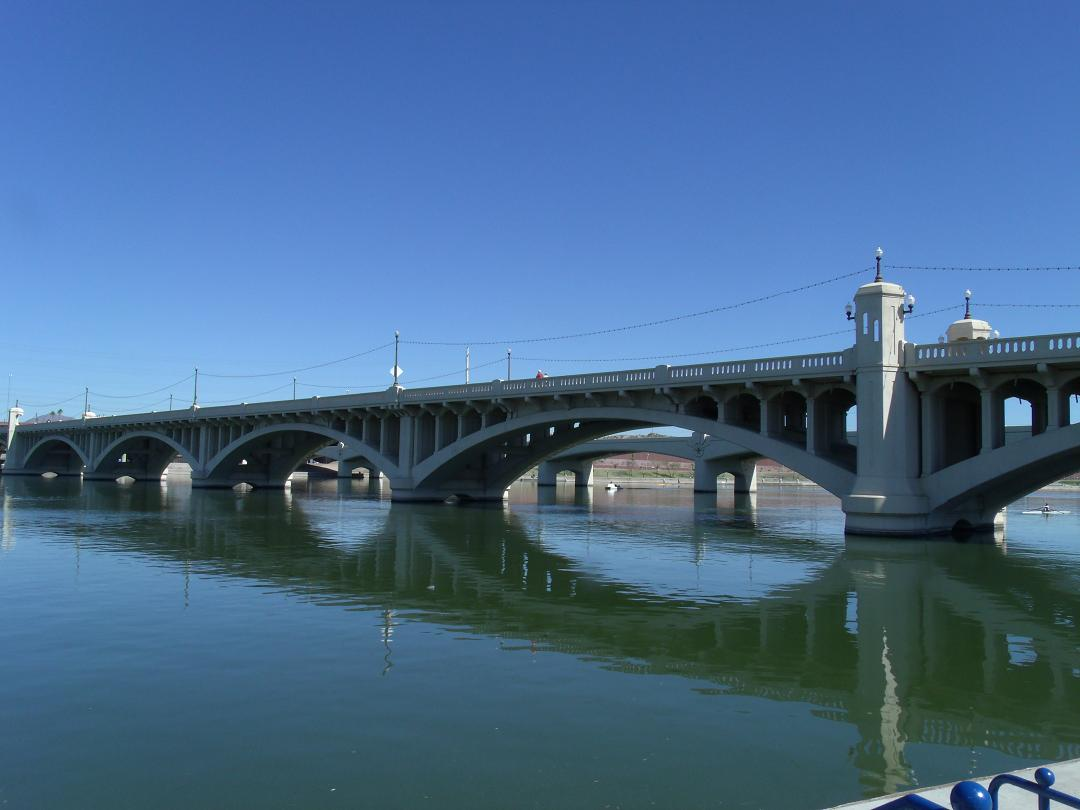
Mill Ave. Bridge.

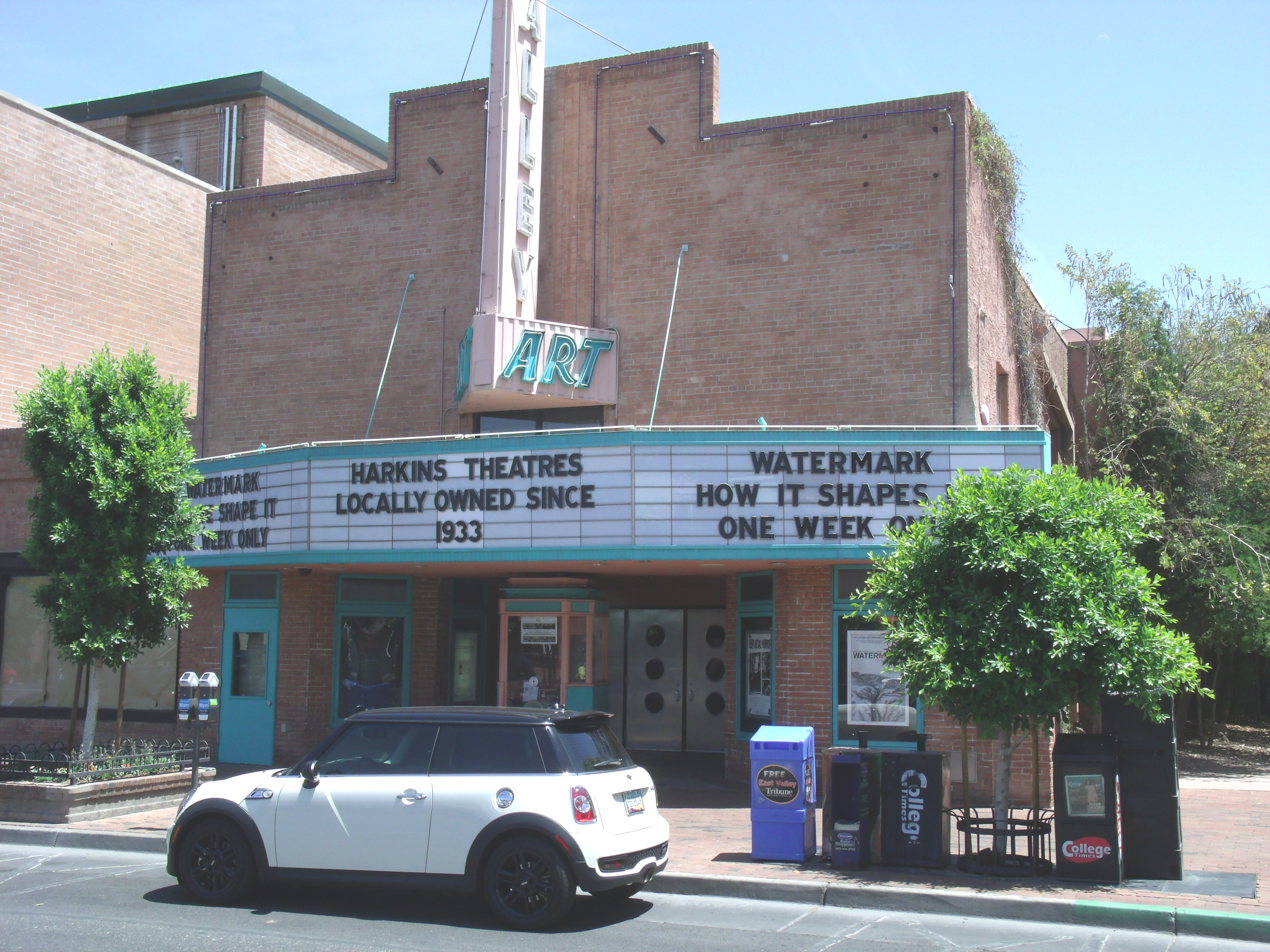
The College Theatre.

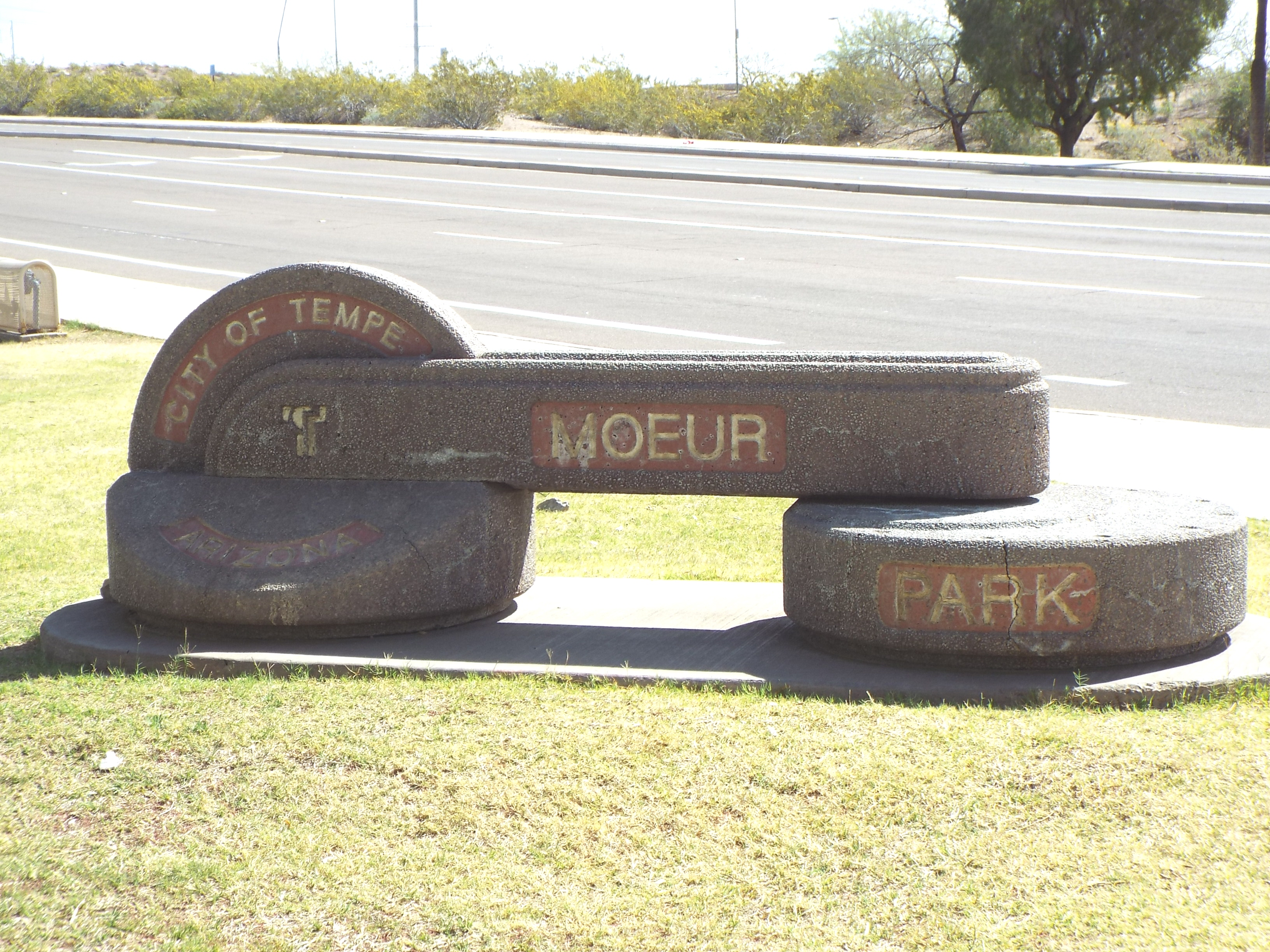
Entrance to Moeur Park.

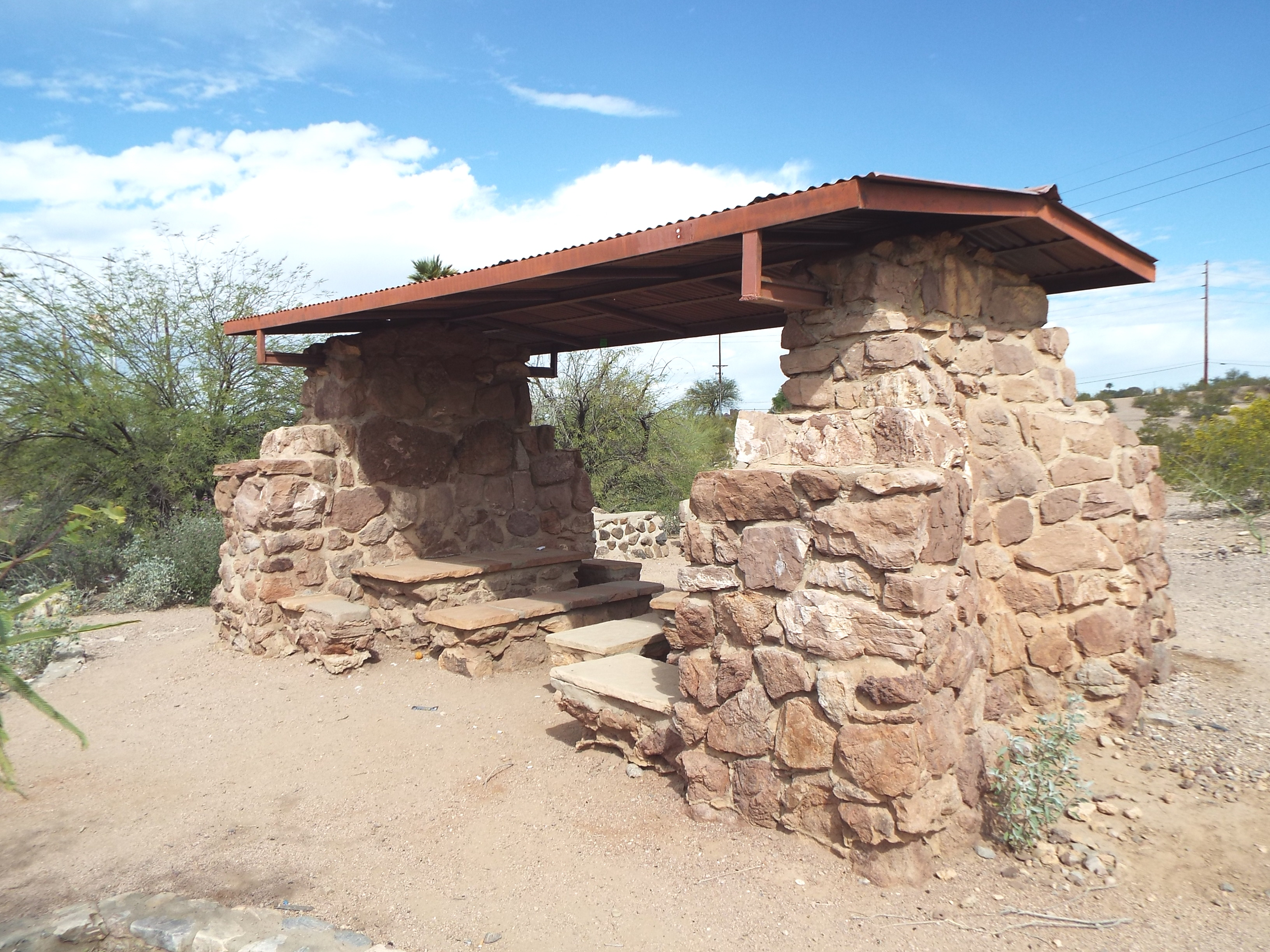
Moeur Park field stone tables and benches.

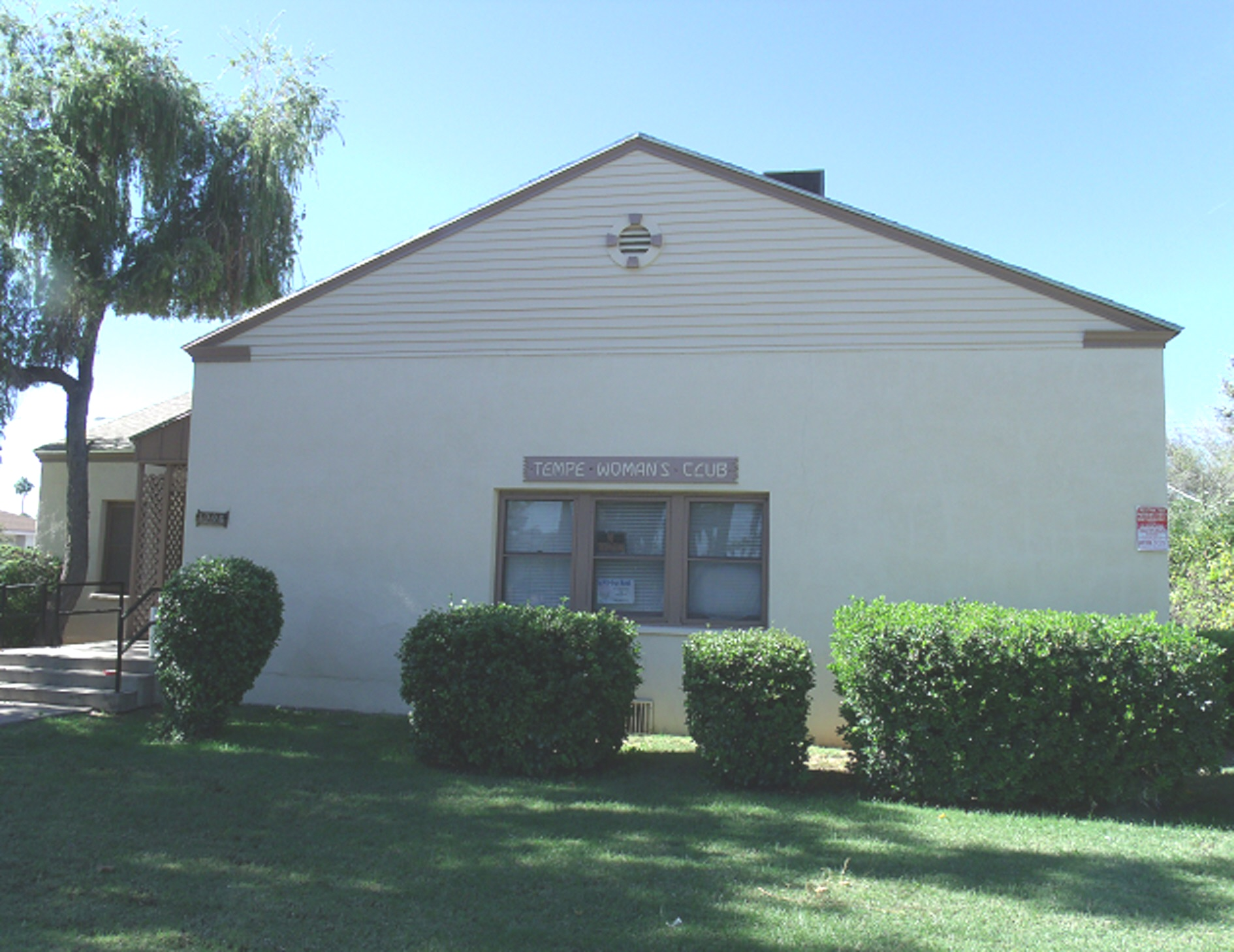
The Tempe Woman’s Club.

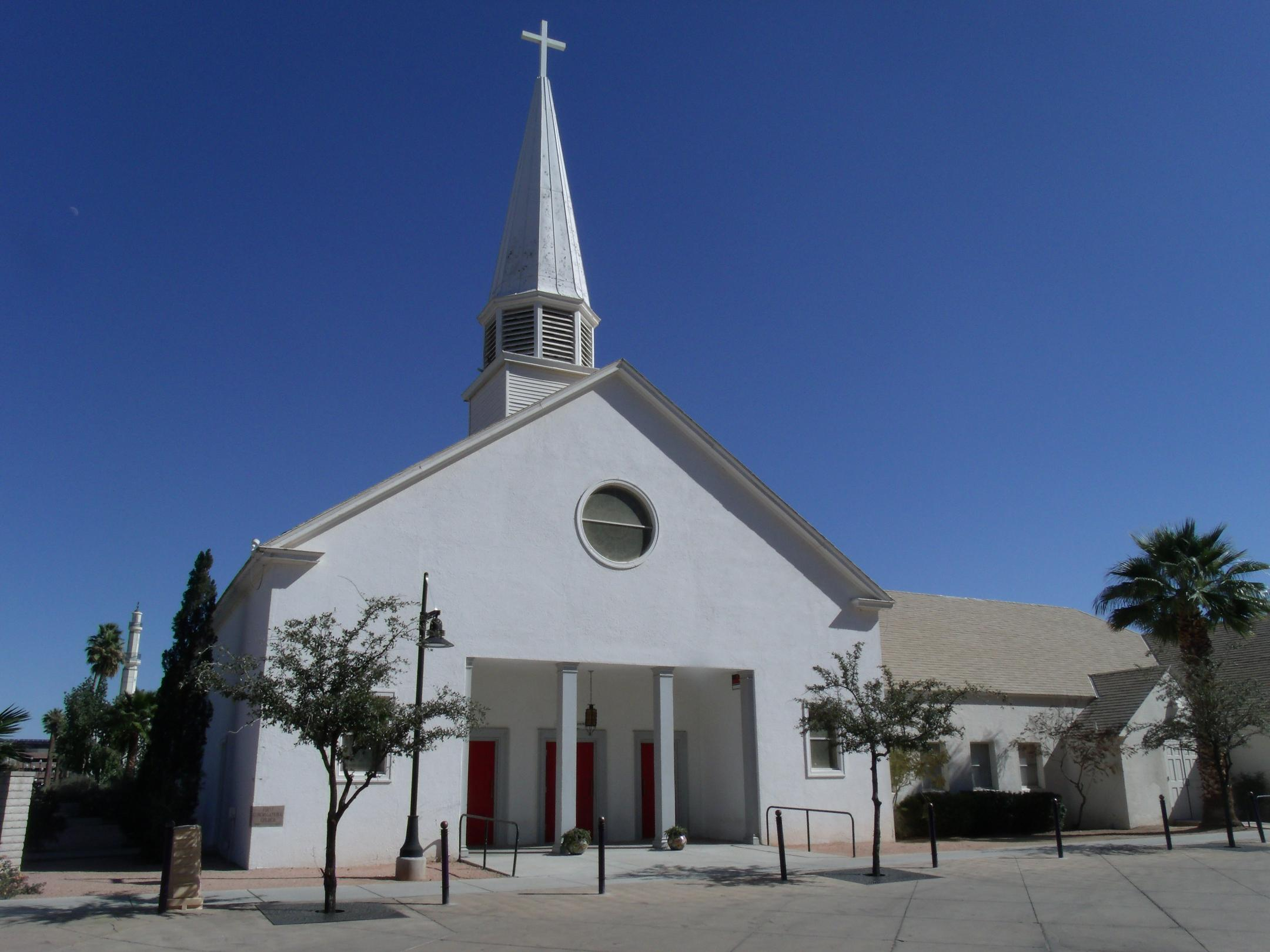
The First Congregational Church.

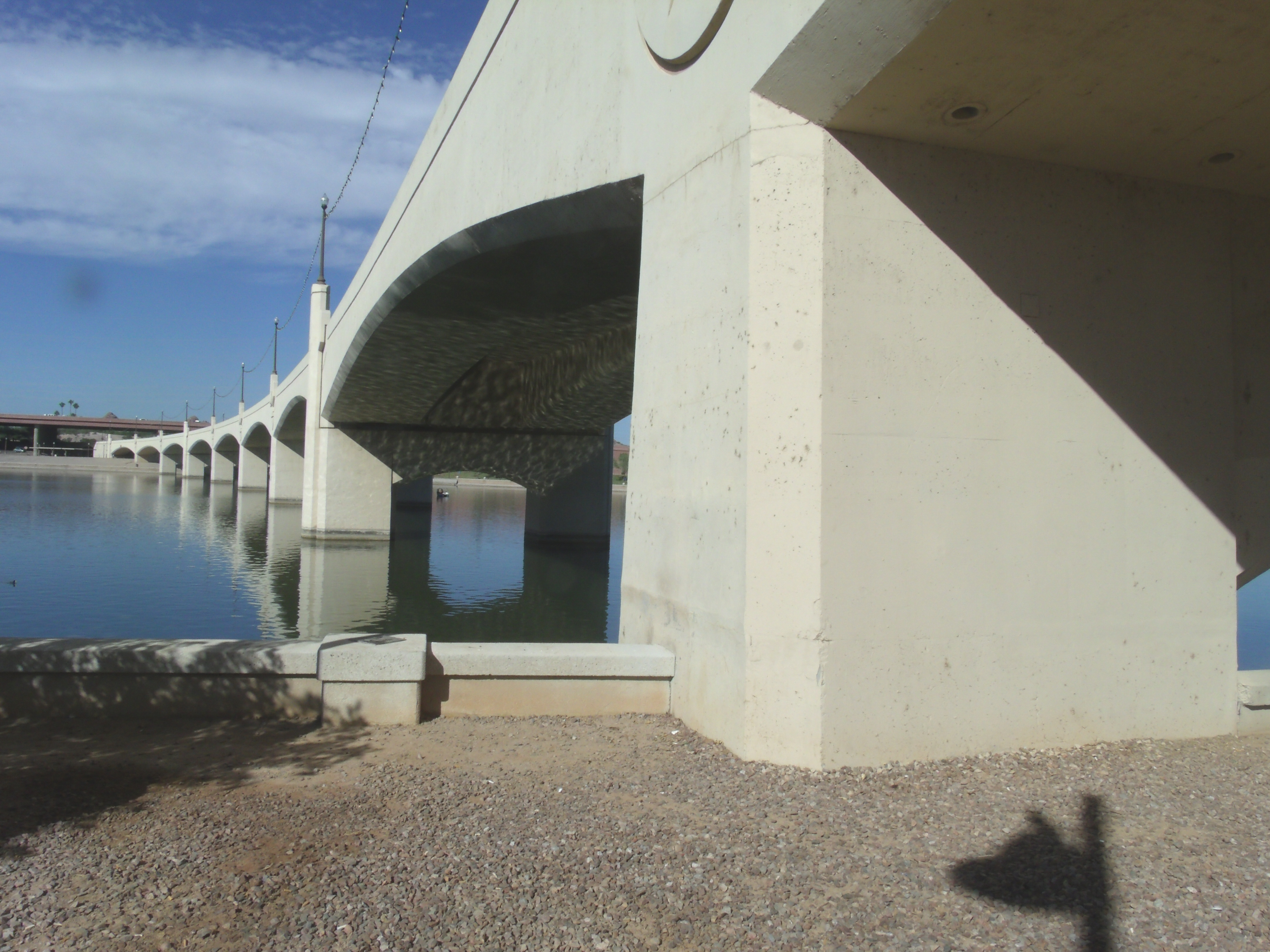
The New Mill Avenue Bridge .

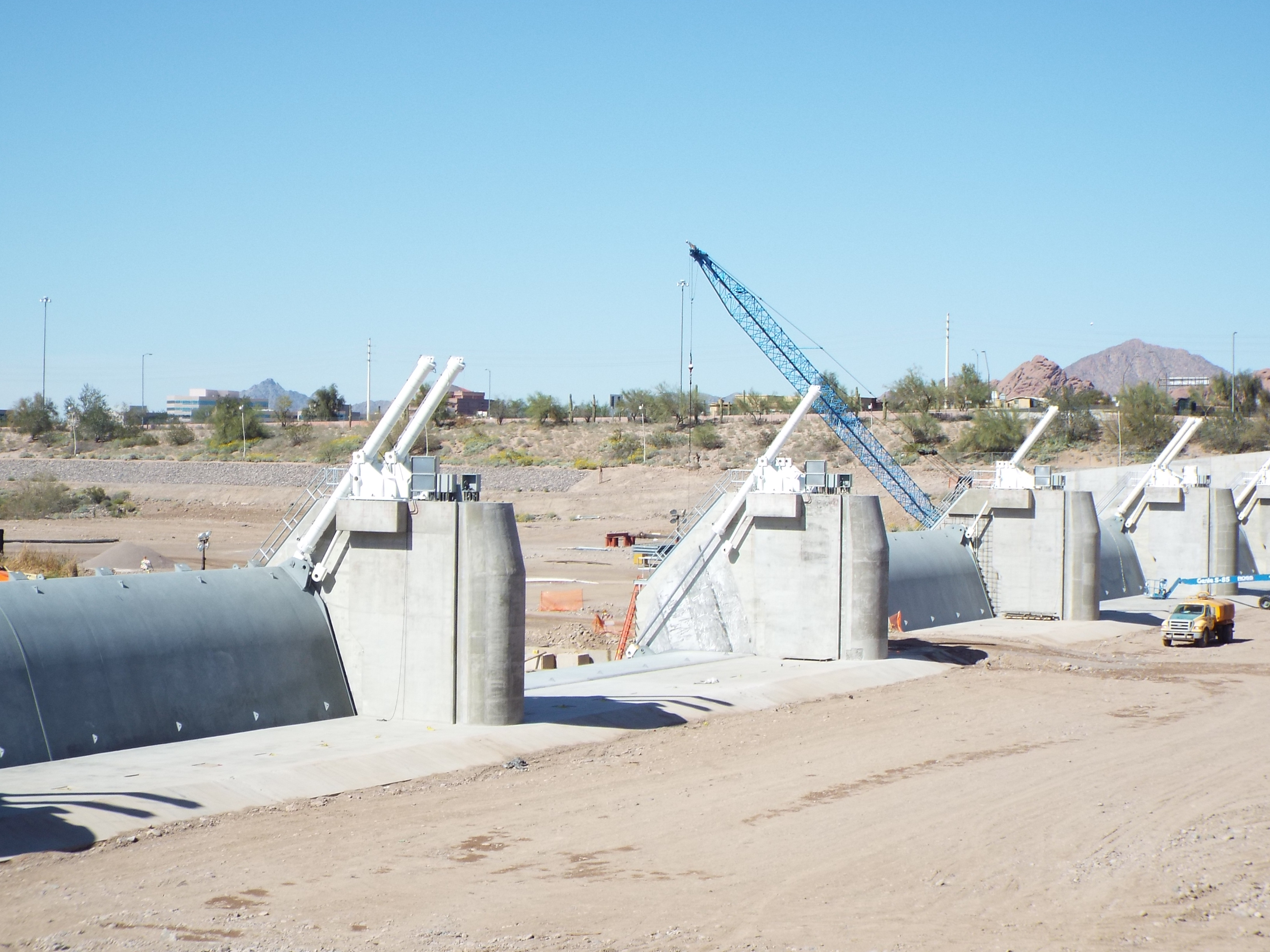
The Tempe Lake Dam under construction in 2016.

== ASU ==
There are various historic buildings located within the Arizona State University Campus. This is abrief description of those whose images are in the gallery.

- Plaque in the main entrance of the Main Building, also known as Old Main and the Normal School.
- Main Building, also known as Old Main and the Normal School – built in 1894. It is located at the ASU Campus in Tempe. It was added to the National Register of Historic Places in 1985. Reference number 85000052.
- President's House, also known as University Archives – built in 1900. It is located in the ASU Campus. It was added to the National Register of Historic Places in 1985. Reference number 85000054.
- The Administration Building, also known as Building #206; Fine Arts Annex – built in 1900. It is located at the ASU Campus (Bldg. 11). It was added to the National Register of Historic Places in 1985. Reference number 85002169.
- Matthews Hall, a.k.a. Building #172 – was built in 1900 and is located in 925 S. Forrest Mall within the ASU Campus. It was listed in the National Register of Historic Places on January 11, 1985, reference #85000053.
- The Industrial Arts Building which is also known as the Anthropology Building or Building #217 – built in 1914. The building, located at 900 Cady Mall, is now known as the School of Human Evolution and Social Change . It is located within the ASU Campus. It was listed in the National Register of Historic Places on September 4, 1985, reference #85002168.
- The B.B. Moeur Activity Building – built in 1925 and located at 201 Orange Mall within the ASU Campus. The building is known as Building #207 . It was listed in the National Register of Historic Places on September 11, 1985, reference #85002171.
- Tempe-The former sanctuary of First United Methodist Church – the church building was built c. 1930 and located in Forrest Mall within the ASU Campus.
- The Grady Gammage Memorial Auditorium – built in 1950 and located on the Northeastern Corner of Mill and Apache Ave. It is also known as Building #140 . It was listed in the National Register of Historic Places on September 11, 1985, reference #85002170.
Historic ASU Campus buildings

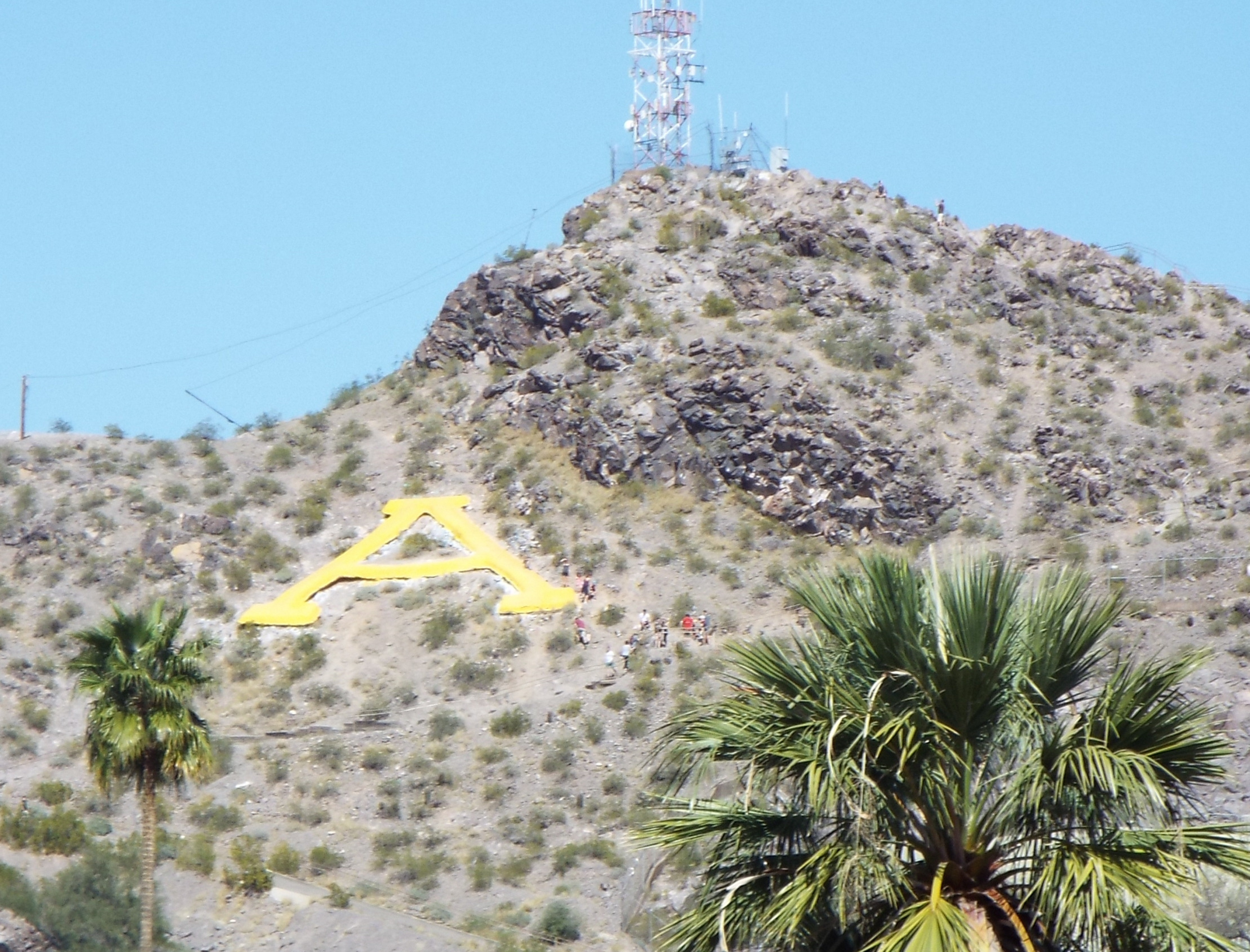
"A " Mountain , as the Tempe Butte is often referred to. The "A " was painted in 1955.

(NRHP = National Register of Historic Places)
(THPR = Tempe Historic Property Register)
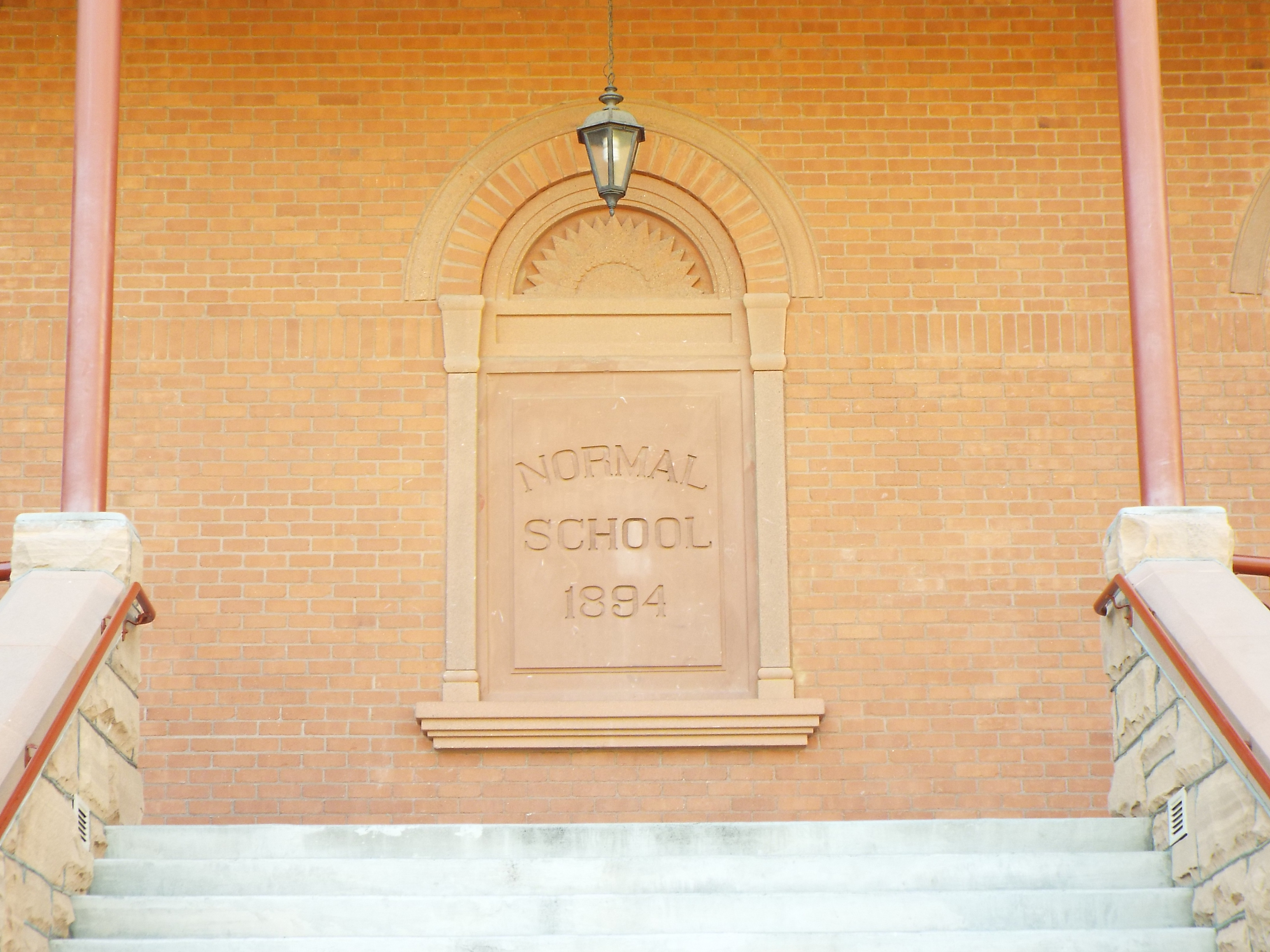
Plaque in the main entrance of the Main Building, also known as Old Main and the Normal School.

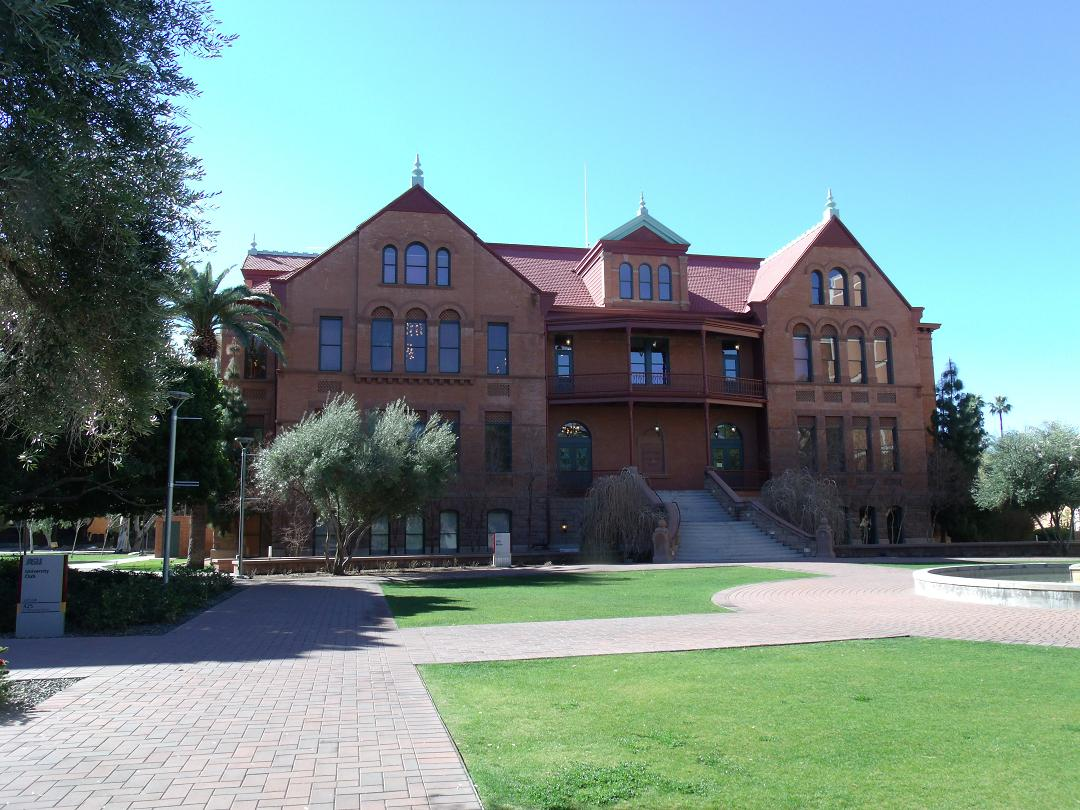
The Main Building.

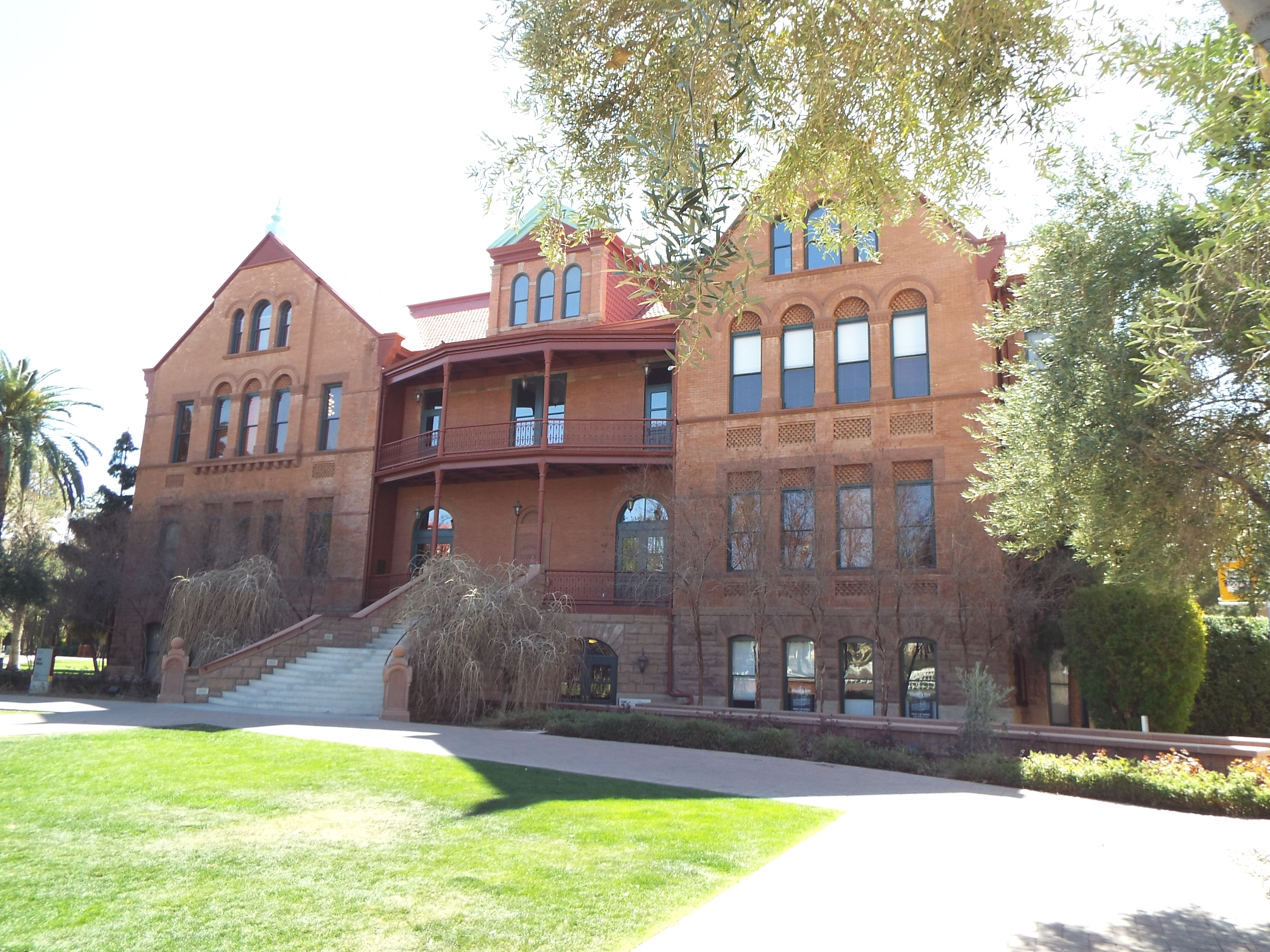
Different view of the Main Building.

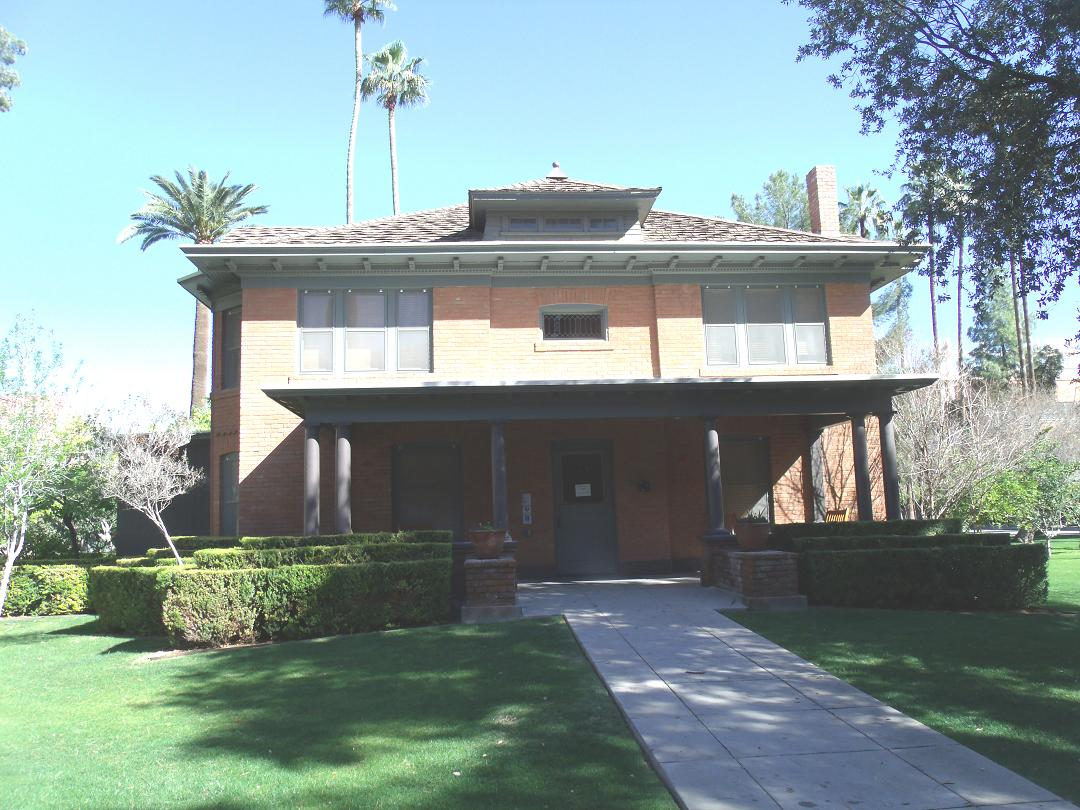
President's House.

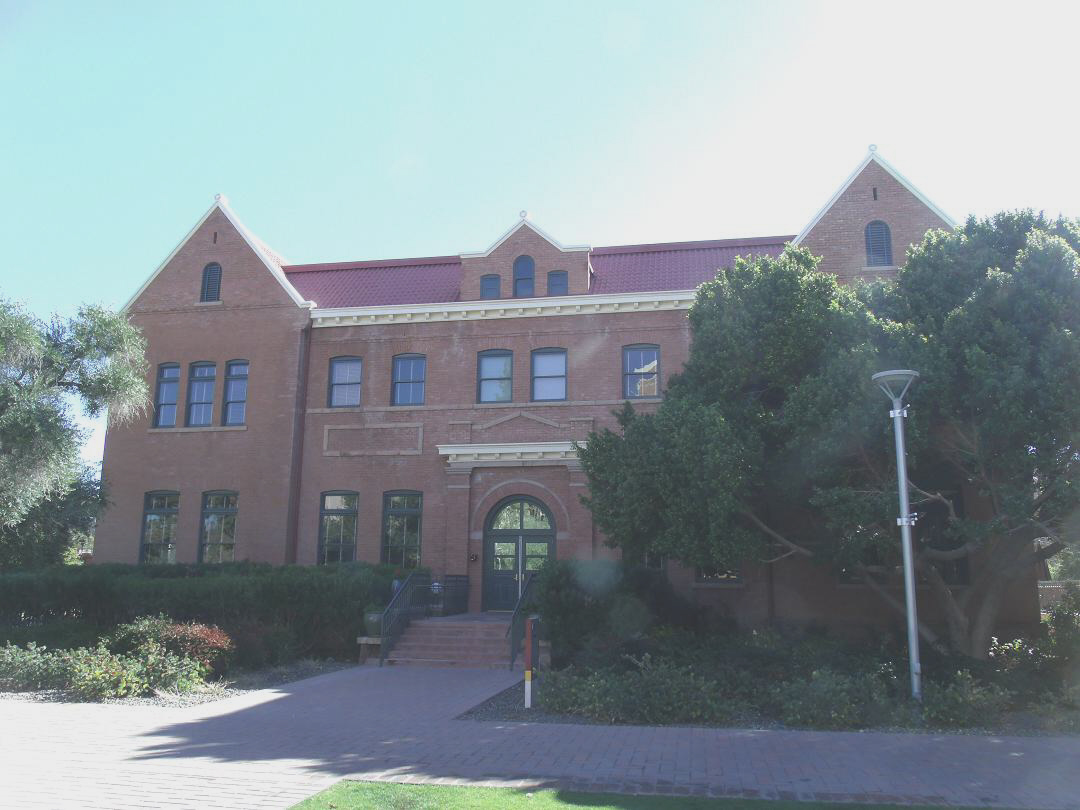
Administration Building.

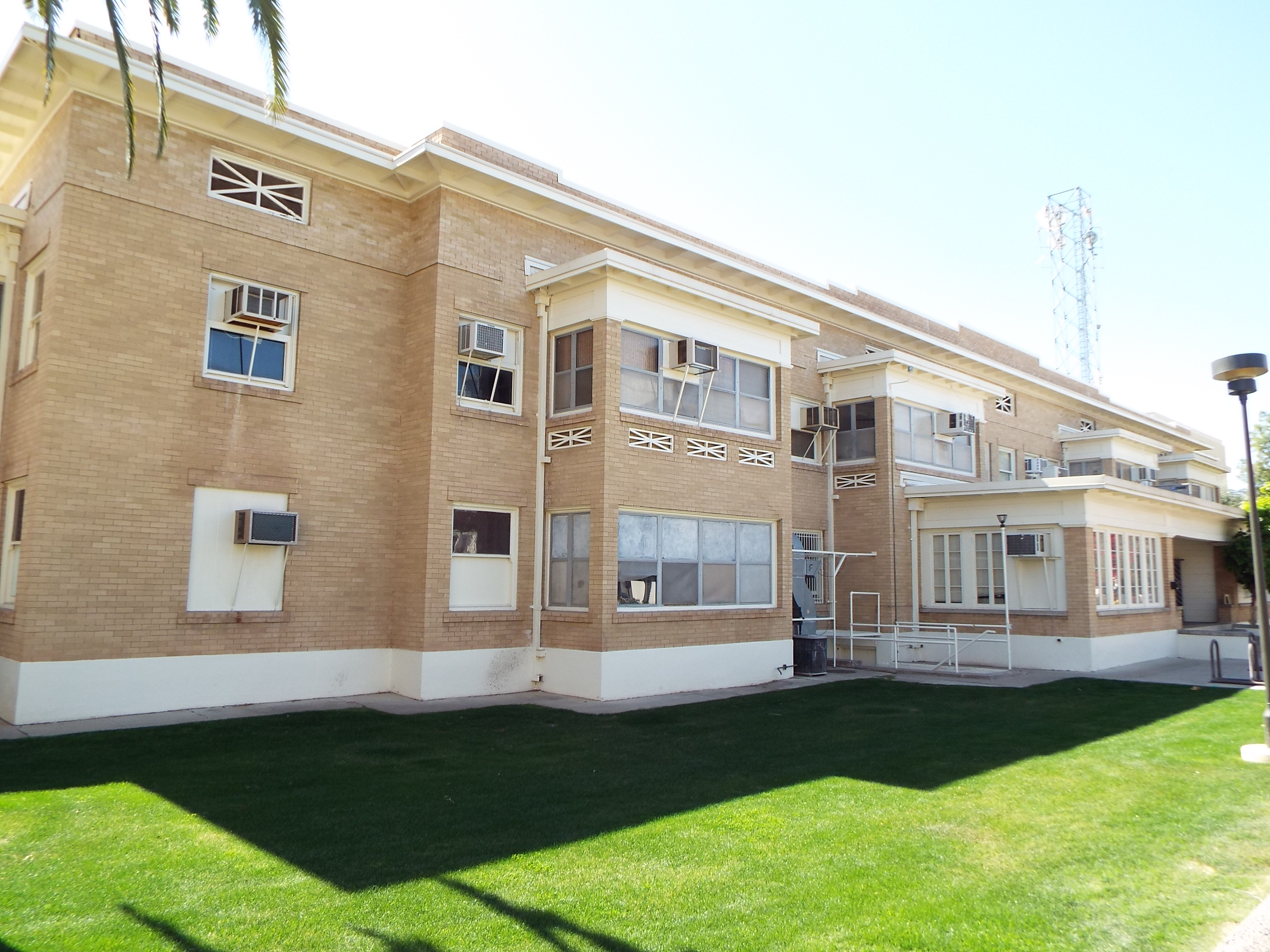
Matthews Hall, a.k.a. Building #172.

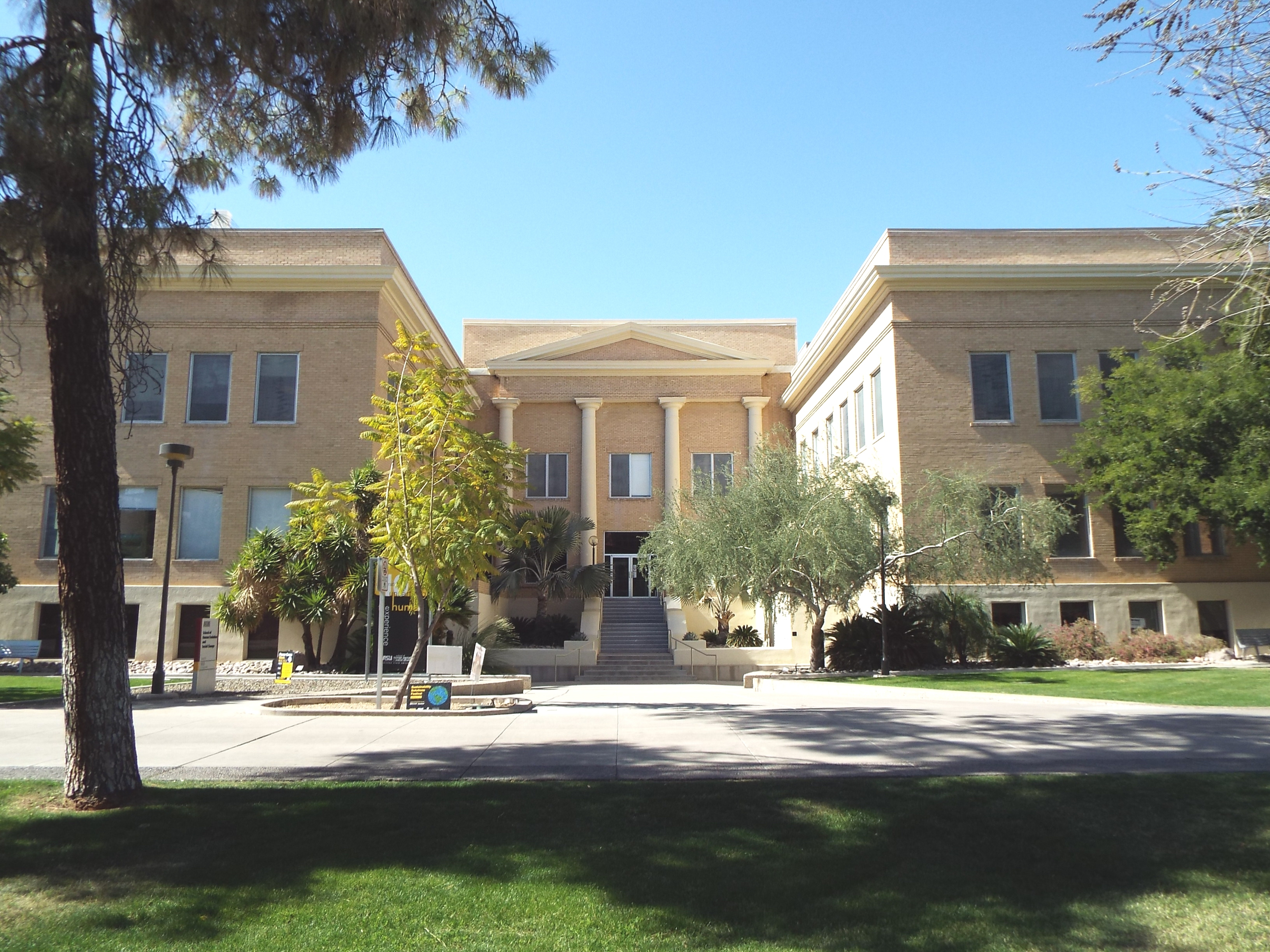
The Industrial Arts Building .

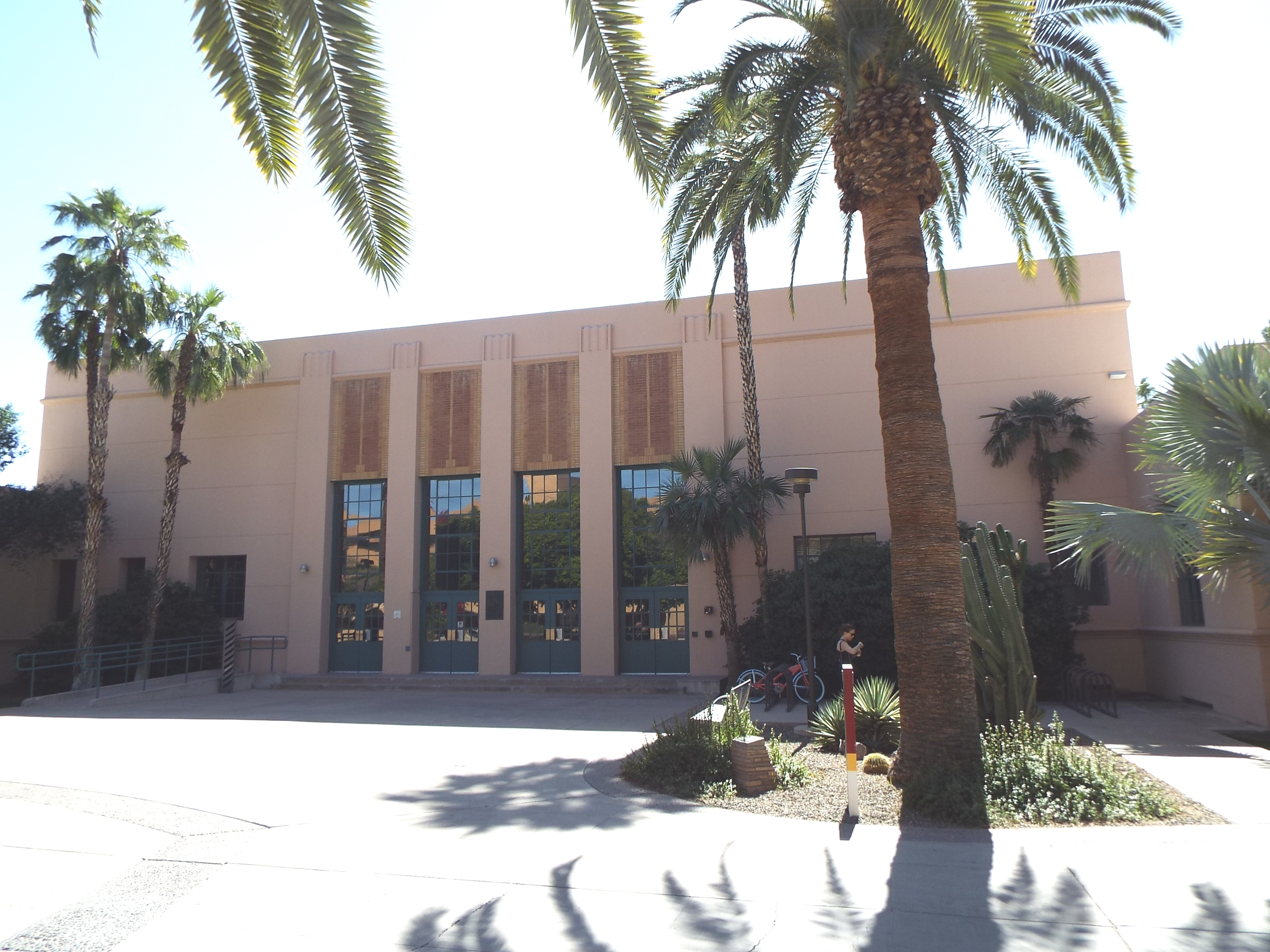
The B.B. Moeur Activity Building .

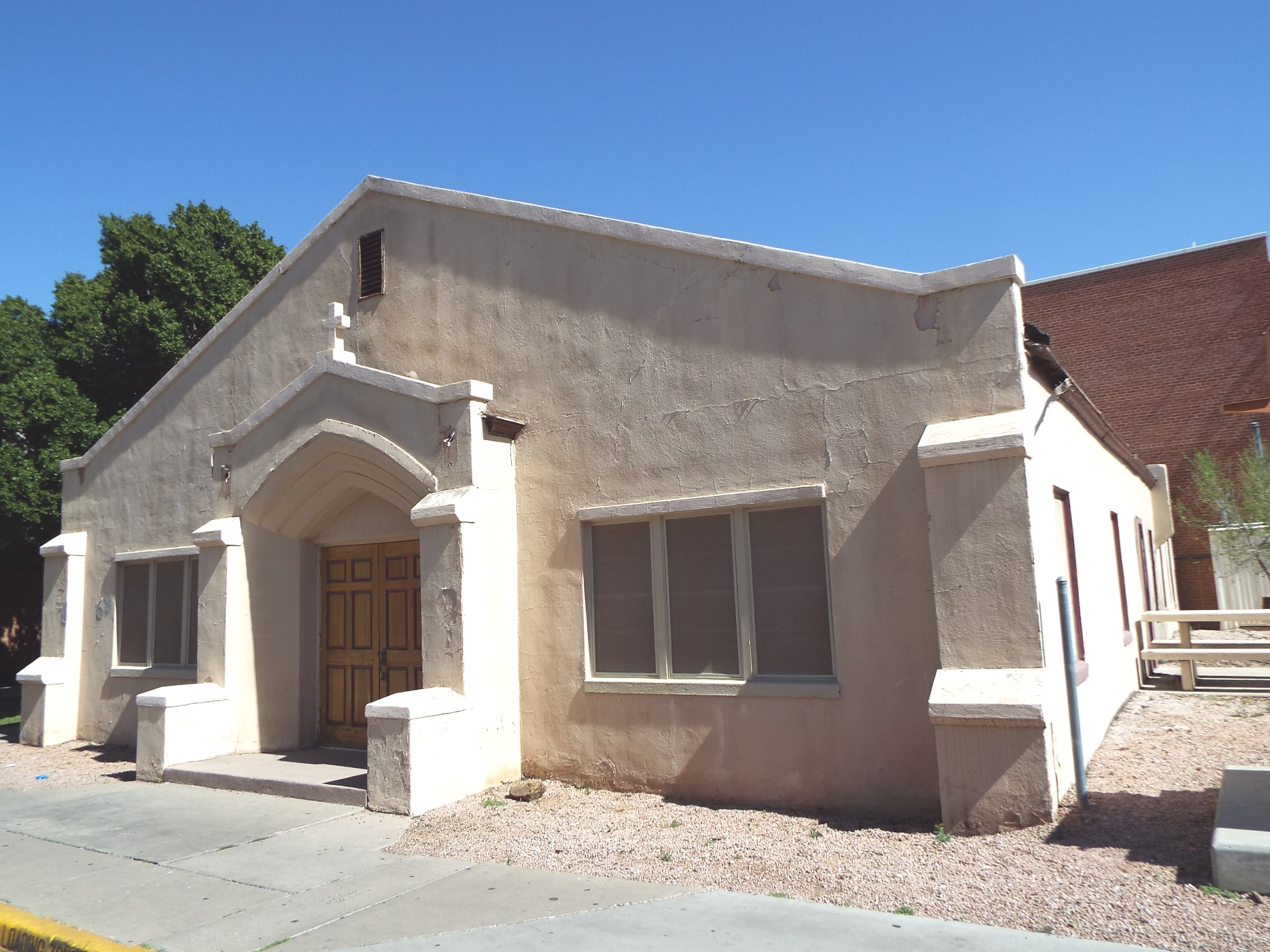
The former sanctuary of First United Methodist Church.

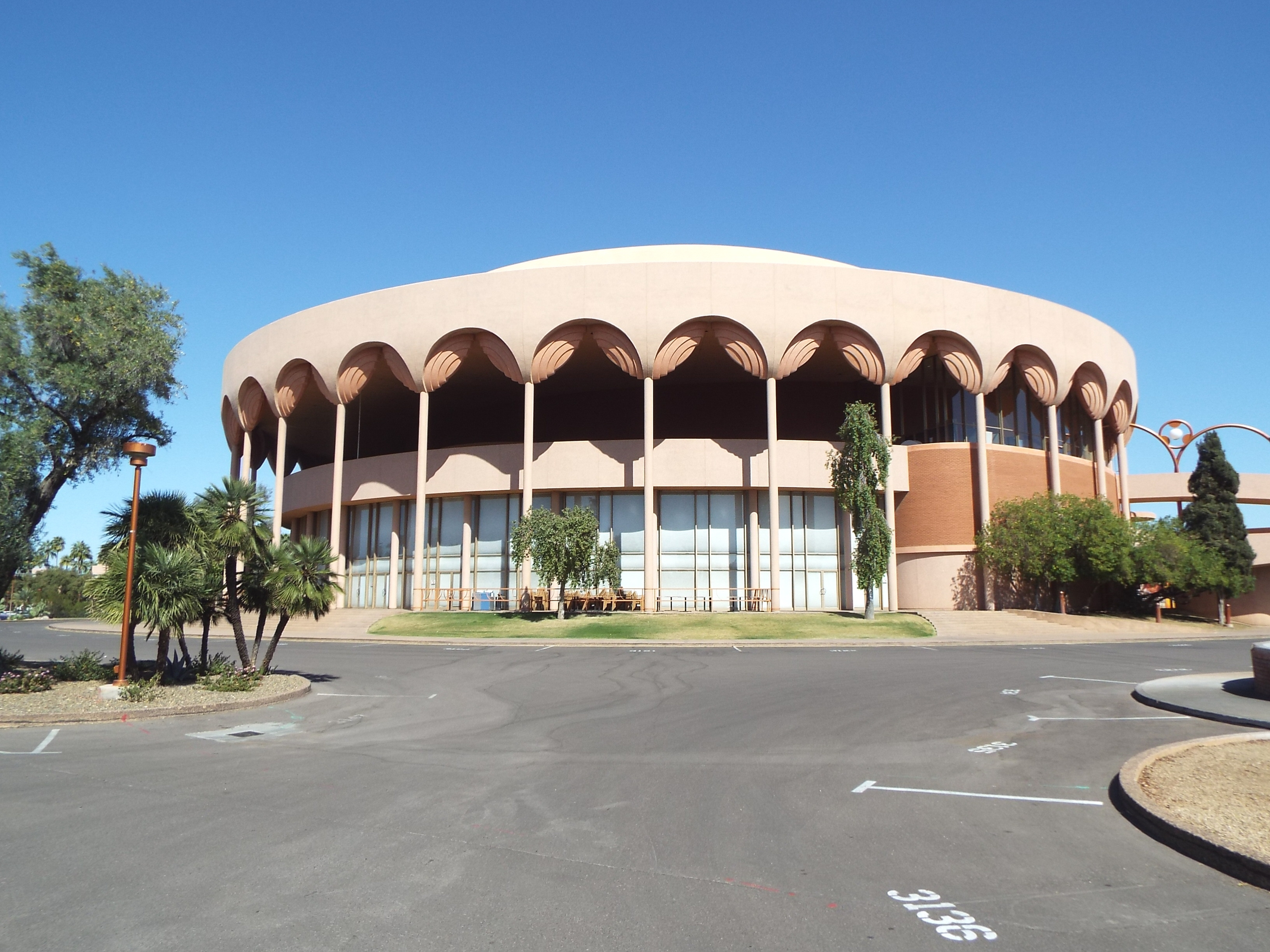
The Grady Gammage Memorial Auditorium .

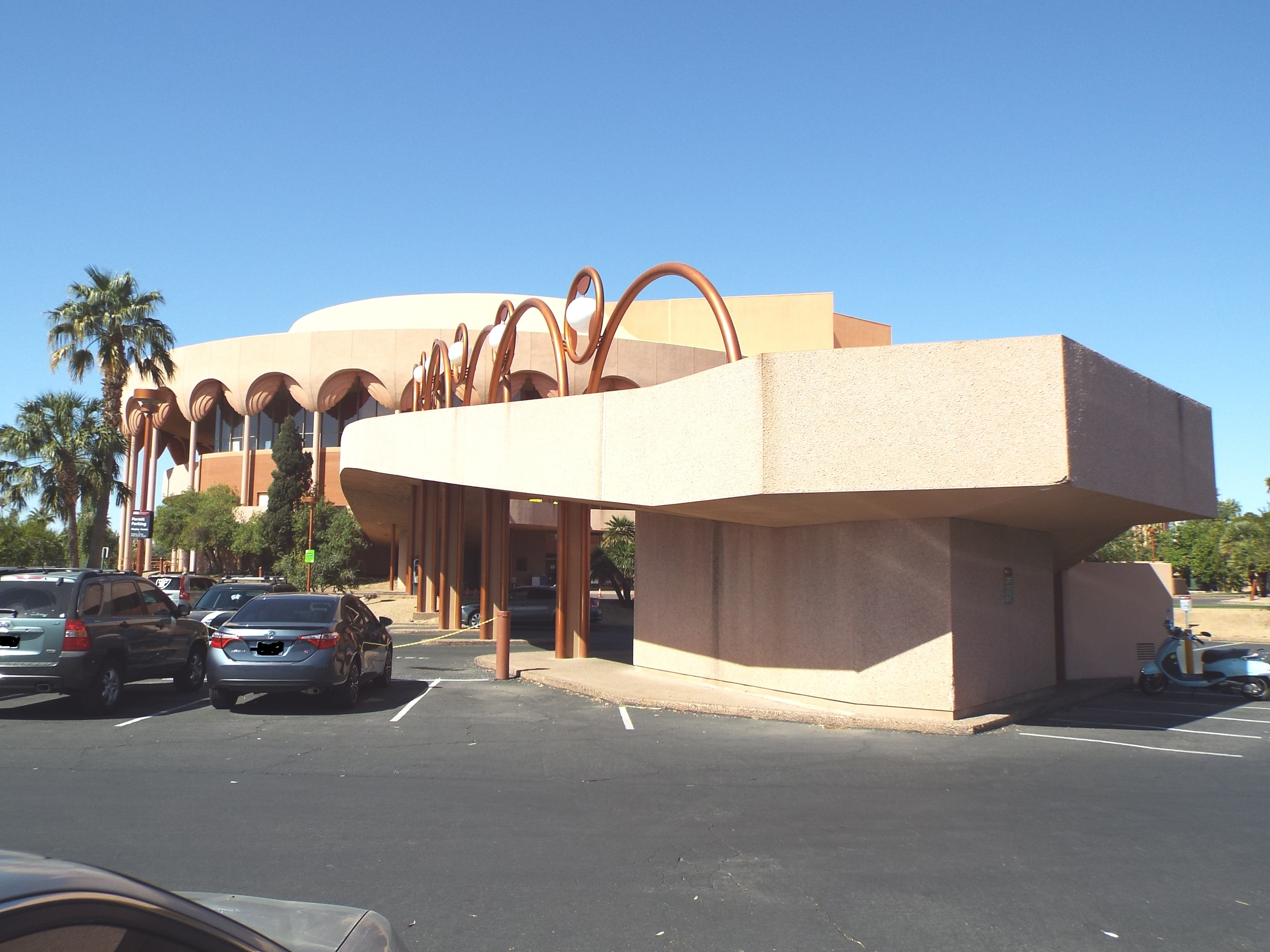
Different view of the Grady Gammage Memorial Auditorium .

== Houses ==
The following is a brief description of the historic houses which are featured in the gallery.

- Charles T. Hayden House – built in 1871 and located at 2000 1 W. Rio Salado Parkway. It is the oldest building in Tempe. It was the residence of Charles Trumbull Hayden and his family. The Hayden family moved out of the house in 1889. It was listed in the National Register of Historic Places on October 10, 1984, reference #84000173.
- The Gonzales-Martinez House – built in 1880 and located at 320 W. First St. Ramon Gonzales was a freighter in Southern Arizona until he relocated to Tempe in about 1877 and was employed by Charles T. Hayden. Jesus Martinez acquired the property in 1892. List in the National Register of Historic Places on May 7, 1984, reference #84000708.
- The Farmer-Goodwin House – built in 1883 and located at 820 S. Farmer Ave.. The house is one of the best-preserved and unique adobe structures in the state. Hiram Bradford Farmer purchased the house for $3,000 in January 1886. Farmer was the first professor and principal at the Territorial Normal School (now Arizona State University) when it opened in February 1886. List in the National Register of Historic Place on December 26, 1972, reference #72000197.
- The Brown-Strong House – built in 1883, is located at 604 (now 605) S. Ash Ave. Samuel Brown was a blacksmith who served as Tempe's mayor from 1902 to 1903. He served as Town Marshal, tax collector and supervisor of streets until 1912. The property is listed in the Tempe Historic Property Register.
- Roy Hackett House – built in 1888 and located at 401-405 W. 4th St. This building is the oldest fired brick building in Tempe, and perhaps possesses the most original integrity of location, design, setting, materials, workmanship, feeling and association of any territorial commercial building in Maricopa County. It was listed in the National Register of Historic Places in 1974, reference #74000458.
- The Sampson-Tupper House – built in 1888 and located at 601 W. 3rd St. The house was built for Mrs. Lulu Sampson, a widow and teacher in the Tempe School system. The house was originally built and located at 109 W. Sixth St. and moved to its current location in order to be preserved. The property is listed in the Tempe Historic Property Register. The house is located in the Roosevelt Addition Historic District which is listed in the National Register of Historic Places reference number 09000959.
- The Gage House – built in 1888 and located at 115 W. University Dr. George Gage was a significant Tempe developer during the 1888 to 1909 period. He was responsible for much of the early urban development of Tempe. The property is listed in the Tempe Historic Property Register.
- The Dines-Hight House – built in 1889 and located at 508 W. Fifth St. in Tempe, Az. The Dines-Hight House is significant as for its association with Tempe's original townsite. Listed in the Tempe Historic Property Register.
- The Elias-Rodriguez House – built in 1890 and located at 927 E. Eighth St.. It is one of the oldest remaining adobe houses in Tempe. The building houses a museum of local Mexican-American history. The property is listed in the Tempe Historic Property Register. The property was listed on the National Register of Historic Places on May 7, 1984, reference number 84000684.
- The Gov. Benjamin B. Moeur House – in built 1892 and located at 34 E. 7th Street. The house was owned by Dr. Benjamin B. Moeur who in 1896 was the town's only full-time physician. He served two terms as governor of Arizona, while still living in this house. It was listed in the National Register of Historic Places on May 30, 2012. reference #12000295.
- The Niels Petersen House – built in 1892 and located at 1414 W. Southern Ave.. The house was built in 1892 by Niels Petersen, a Danish immigrant who came to Tempe in 1871. He developed a ranch with substantial land holdings, was president of the Farmers and Merchants Bank, co-founder of the Methodist Episcopal Church, and a representative at the 18th Territorial Legislature. Creighton, the architect, worked for many years in Arizona, and among his extant works are the Pinal County Courthouse, Old Main at the University of Arizona, and the Tempe Hardware Building on Mill Avenue in Tempe. It was listed in the National Register of Historic Places on January 5, 1978, reference #78000553.
- The Spear House – built in 1893 and located at 1015 S. Farmer Ave.. Myron Spear (a Civil War veteran) and his wife Sylvia Spear built the house in 1893. Myron worked as a baker and a drayman, and for a time had his own express business; Sylvia worked as a nurse. It is listed in the Tempe Historic Property Register.
- Harry Walker House – built in 1903 and located at 118 E. 7th Street. The architectural style: Neo-Colonial Influence. It was listed in the National Register of Historic Places on May 7, 1984, reference #84000745.
- The Harrington-Birchett House – built in 1895 and located at 202 E. 7th Street. The house was built by J.W. Harrington and sold in 1904 to Mattie Birchett. Matties' son, Joseph T. Birchett married Guess Eleanor Anderson that same year. He served as Tempe's mayor from 1912 to 1914. Guess was the sister of Honor Anderson Moeur, wife of Arizona Governor Benjamin B. Moeur. It was listed in the National Register of Historic Places on May 7, 1984, reference #84000716.
- The C.P. Mullen House, a.k.a. D. R. Van Petten House – built in 1900 and located in 918 Mill Ave. It was listed in the National Register of Historic Places on May 7, 1984, reference #84000734.
- The Morrow-Hudson House – built in 1904 and located at 1203 E. Alameda Drive. This house belonged to Estmer Hudson was an Arizona pioneer who in 1916, with Charles Henry Waterhouse introduced the new Egyptian cotton, commonly known as Pima cotton. Listed in the National Register of Historic Places on May 7, 1984, reference #84000733.
- The Hugh Laird House – built in 1908 and located at 821 S. Farmer Ave.. The house belonged to Hugh Laird a businessman and public servant. Laird career was a registered pharmacist and owner of Laird and Dines Drug Store. He served 12 years as Tempe postmaster and two terms as a representative in the state legislature. He also served a 32-year consecutive seat on the Tempe City Council, 14 of those years as Mayor. Listed in the National Register of Historic Places on May 7, 1984, reference #84000726.
- The Cummins House – built in 1909 and located at 839 S. Farmer Ave. in Tempe, Az. Aaron and Margaret Cummins acquired undeveloped Lot 10, Block 1 of Farmer's Addition in May 1908, mortgaged the property in March 1909, and built the house soon thereafter. Listed in the Tempe Historic Property Register.
- The Chavez House – built in 1910 and located at 927 S. Farmer Ave.. Ramon immigrated to the U.S. from Mexico in 1904 and married Nicolasa in 1910; he worked in the Tempe area as a ranch laborer. Ramon and Nicolasa Chavez built the house and remained at the address until 1930.Listed in the Tempe Historic Property Register.
- The W.A. Moeur House – built in 1910 and located at 850 S. Ash Ave. W.A. Moeur was the brother of Gov. Benjamin B. Moeur. He assisted in organizing the Tempe School system and was a member of the first Tempe school board. The house is used as a restaurant. The property is listed in the Tempe Historic Property Register. The property was listed on the National Register of Historic Places on May 7, 1984, reference number 84000730.
- The Carns- Buck House – built in 1914 and located at 902 Farmer Ave. This was one of the first houses built in the Goodwin Addition. The property is listed in the Tempe Historic Property Register.
- The D.J. Frankenberg House – built in 1915 and located at 2222 S. Price Road. This house was built by Don Juan Frankenberg. Frankenberg and his family were pioneers and ranchers in the Tempe area as early as 1888. In 1915, D. J. Frankenberg built this house for his family on the family homestead. That same year, he was selected to experiment with Pima Long Staple Cotton as part of the program with the Government Experimental Farm (USDA) at Sacaton, Arizona. Cotton farming was successful in the Tempe area until the loss of the market in the 1920s. Listed in the National Register of Historic Places on January 2, 2008, reference #07001333.
- The Judd House – built in 1915 and located at 1208 S. Farmer Ave.. This house was built by Alfred and Ellen Bell who acquired a twenty-five-acre farm in the southwest quarter of the northwest quarter of Section 21 (T1N R4E) in 1914. In 1938, Orion and Anna Judd became the owners of the house.
- The Byron Redden House – built in 1918 located at 948 S. Ash Ave.. The house was built in 1918 by Charles H. Gable, and was bought by Byron Redden in 1920. Byron Redden was a successful rancher and served 25 years as a zanjero (irrigation canal manager) for the Tempe Canal Company. Listed in the National Register of Historic Places on May 7, 1984, reference #84000738.
- The Windes- Bell House – built in 1920 and located at 24 9th Street. The house is significant for its association with Tempe attorney Dudley Windes and with Tempe pioneer Ellen Bell. The property is listed in the Tempe Historic Property Register.
- The Nichols House – built in 1920 and located at 919 Maple Ave. The property is listed in the Tempe Historic Property Register.
- The Lowell Redden House – built in 1920 and located at 333 E. Carver St.. The property was listed in the National Register of Historic Places on February 13, 1985, reference Number 85000407.
- The B.H. Scudder Rental House – built in 1920 and located at 919 S. Maple Ave. The property was listed in the National Register of Historic Places on May 7, 1984, reference number 84000740.
- The Scudder House – built in 1929 and located at 959 S Ash Avenue. The house belonged to Benjamin Scudder, a local educator who built several rental houses in the Maple and Ash Avenue area. The property is listed in the Tempe Historic Property Register.
- The Sidney B. Moeur House – built in 1921 and located at 903 S. Ash Ave. Sidney B. Moeur was the son of W.A. Moeur and nephew of Arizona Governor Benjamin B. Moeur. The property is listed in the Tempe Historic Property Register.
- The Selleh House – built in 1925 and located at 1104 S. Mill Ave. During the Great Depression Joseph “Joe” Selleh played baseball, golf and tennis for ASU. He also coached the baseball, golf and tennis teams. Selleh served as an assistant with the football team. The house was listed in the National Register of Historic Places on November 5, 2005, reference #05001197.
- The Minson House – built in 1925 and located at 1034 S. Mill Ave. The property is listed in the Tempe Historic Property Register.
- The Elliot House – built in 1925 and located in 1010 Maple Ave. It was listed in the National Register of Historic Places on May 7, 1984, reference #84000693.
- The Guthrie House – built in 1927 and located at 600 5th Street. The property is listed in the Tempe Historic Property Register.
- The Blakely House – built in 1927 and located at 305 S. Roosevelt Street.The property is listed in the Tempe Historic Property Register.
- The McGinnes House – built in 1928 and located at 915 Maple, Ave. The property is listed in the Tempe Historic Property Register.
- The Hiatt House is also known as the Barnes House – It was built in 1928 and is located at 1104 Ash Ave. It was listed in the National Register of Historic Places on May 7, 1984, reference #84000720.
- The Harris House – built in 1931 and located 823 Maple Ave. The property is listed in the Tempe Historic Property Register.
- The Lucier/O’Neill House – built in 1933 and located at 1114 Maple Ave. The property is listed in the Tempe Historic Property Register.
- The Butler (Gray) House – built in 1939 and located at 1220 Mill Ave. The property is listed in the Tempe Historic Property Register.
- The Bauer House – built in 1934 and located at 599 5th Street. The property is listed in the Tempe Historic Property Register.
- The Douglas-Gitlis House – built in 1935 and located at 1206 Ash Ave. The property is listed in the Tempe Historic Property Register.
- The Marriot House – built in 1935 and located at 606 S. Roosevelt Street. The property is listed in the Tempe Historic Property Register. [DEMOLISHED]
- The Baker House – built in 1936 and located at 1029 Maple Ave. The property is listed in the Tempe Historic Property Register.
- The Governor John Howard Pyle House – built in 1938 and located at 1120 S. Ash Avenue. Pyle was the 9th Governor of Arizona (Arizona Governor, 1950–1954). The property is listed in the Tempe Historic Property Register.
- The Diefenderfer House – built in 1939 and located at 1223 S Farmer Avenue. This one-story masonry house was built with Bungalow influences by Federick and Mary Diefenderfer, a retired couple who acquired the lot in 1939. The property is listed in the Tempe Historic Property Register.
- The Wexler House – built in 1940 and located at 1215 Maple Ave. The property is listed in the Tempe Historic Property Register.
- The Barnes House _ built in 1940 and located at 1203 Ash Ave. The property is listed in the Tempe Historic Property Register.
- The Burket House – built in 1945 and located at 501 5th Street. The property is listed in the Tempe Historic Property Register.
- The Sandra Day O'Connor's House – built in 1959. O'Connor's house was moved from Paradise Valley, Ariz., to Tempe's Papago Park. (THPR)
Historic houses
(NRHP = National Register of Historic Places)
(THPR = Tempe Historic Property Register)
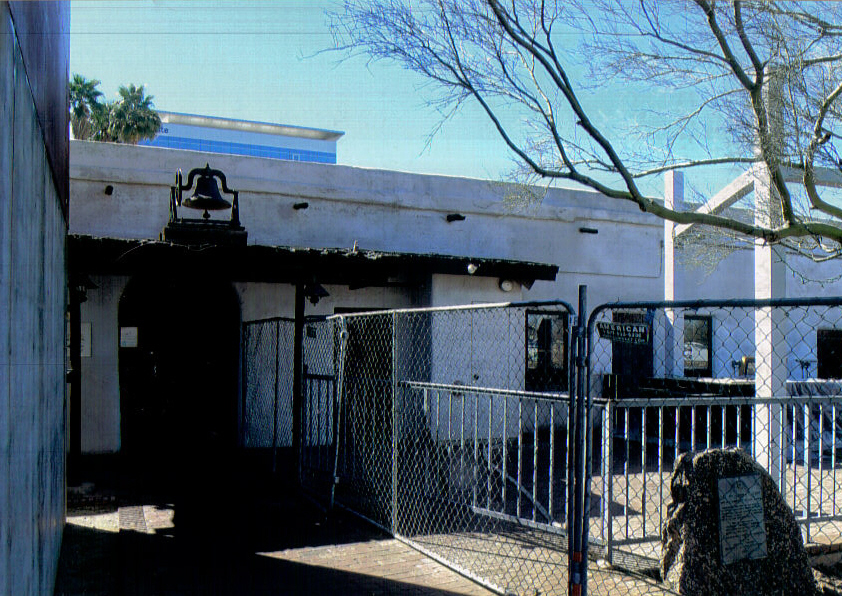
Charles T. Hayden House.

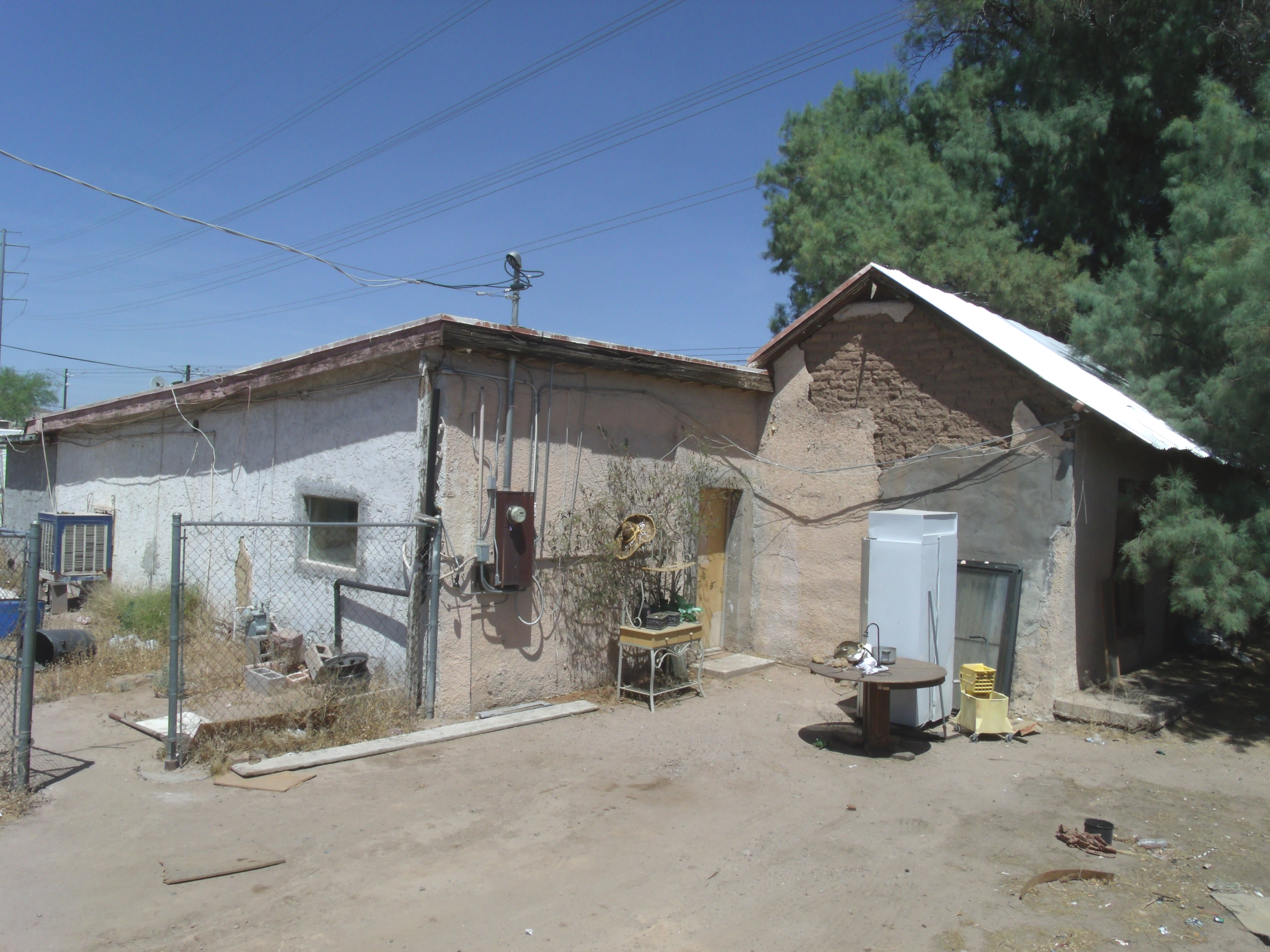
The Gonzales-Martinez House.

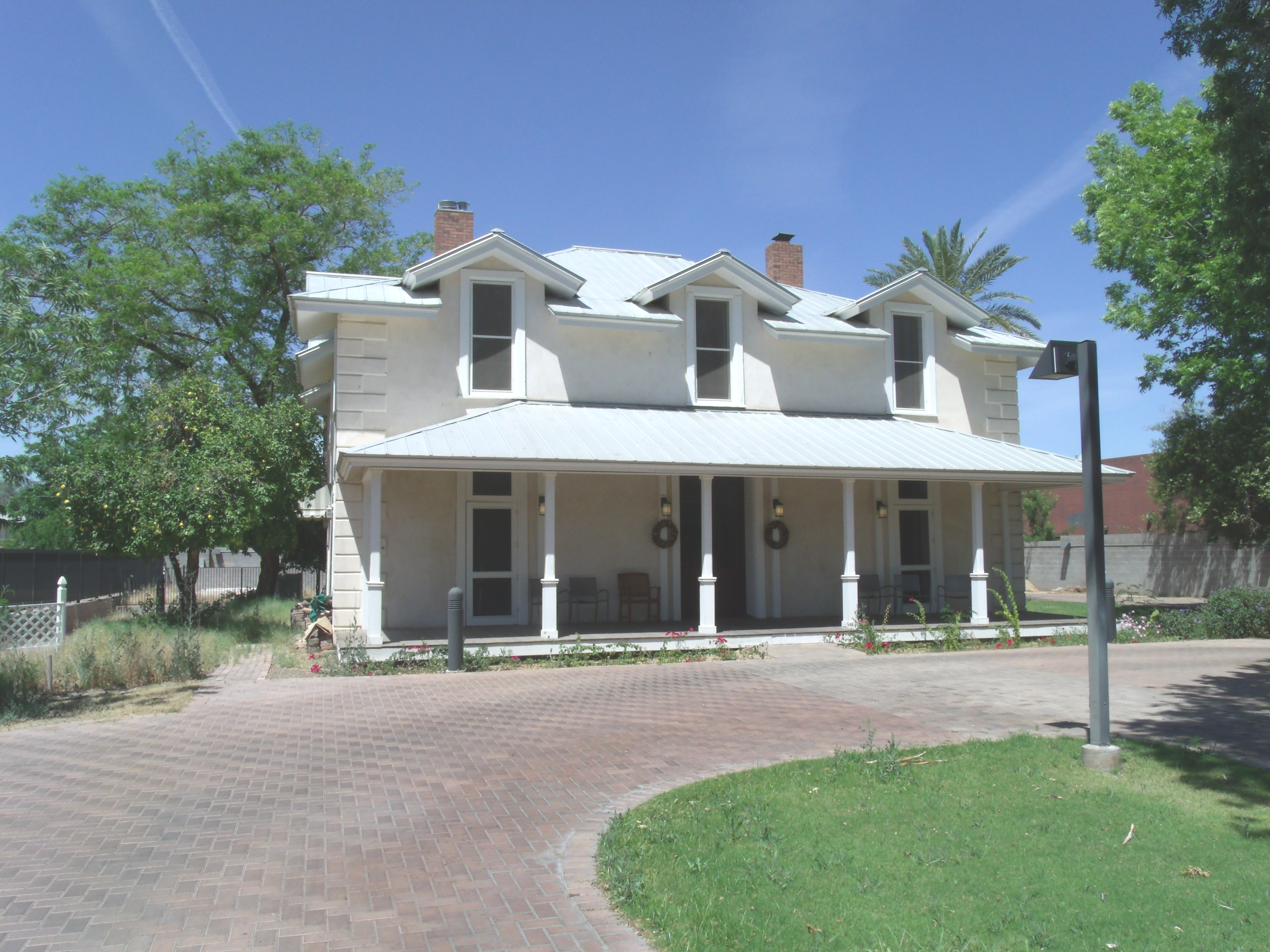
The Farmer-Goodwin House.

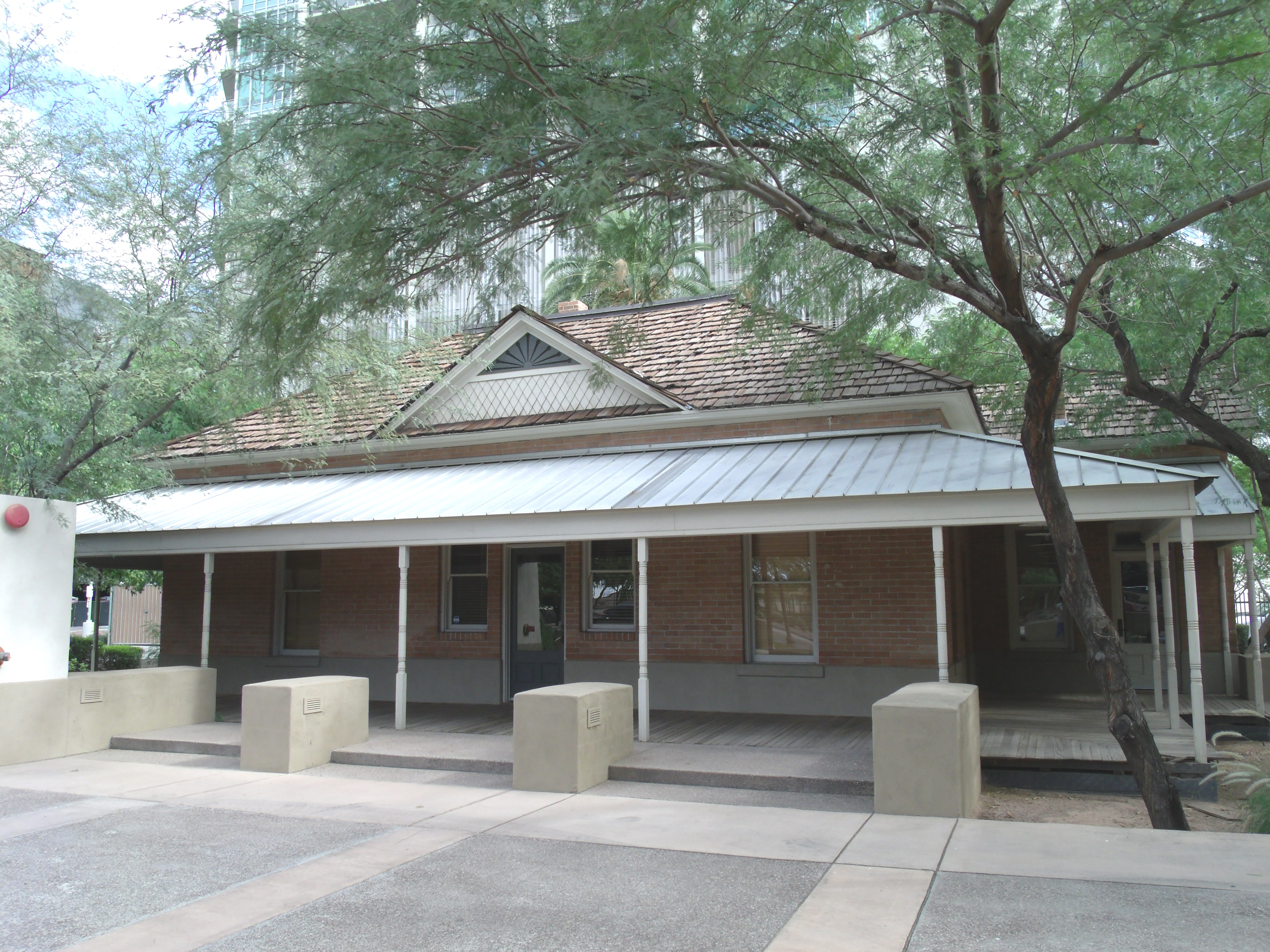
The Brown-Strong House .

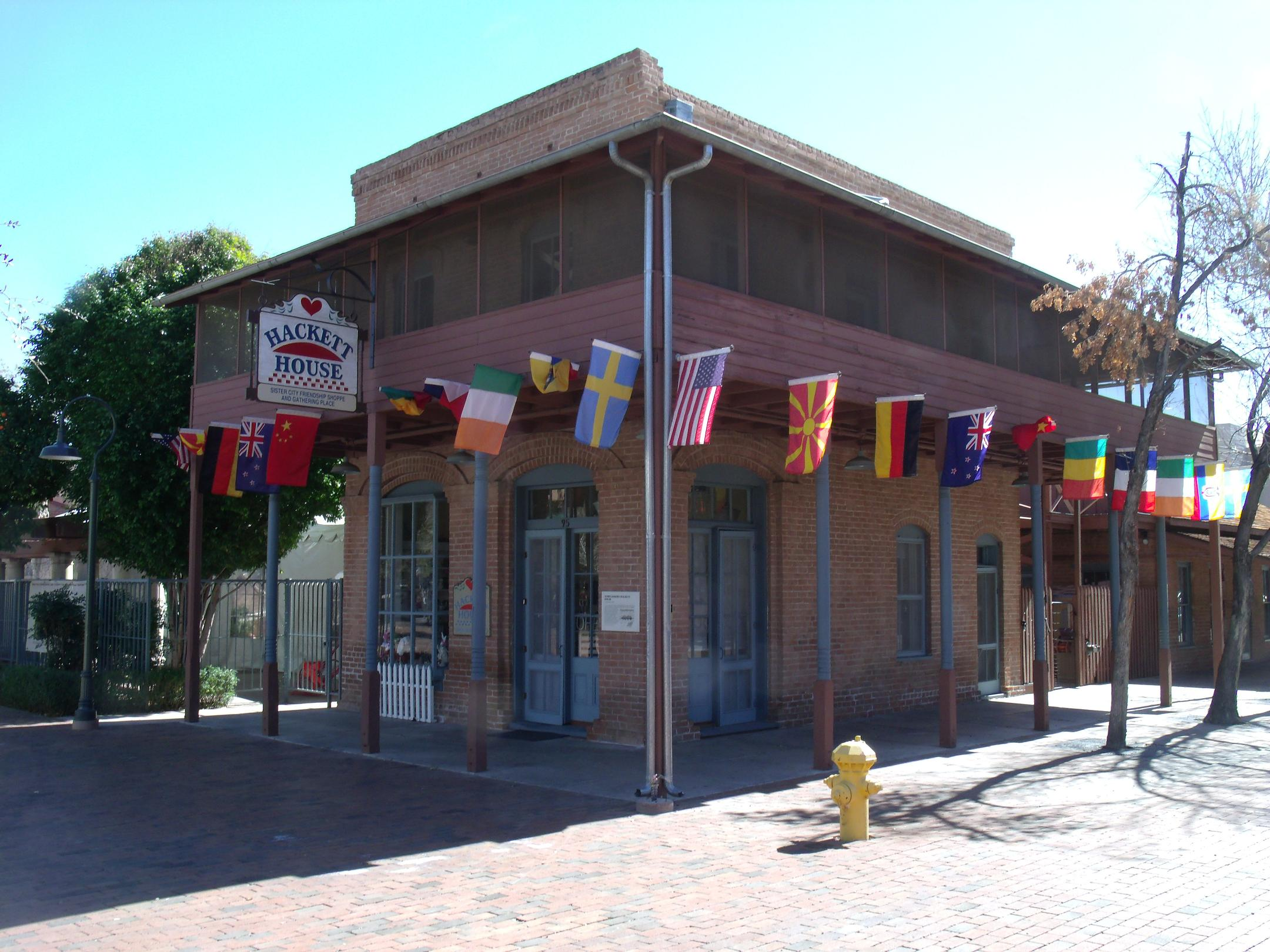
Roy Hackett House.

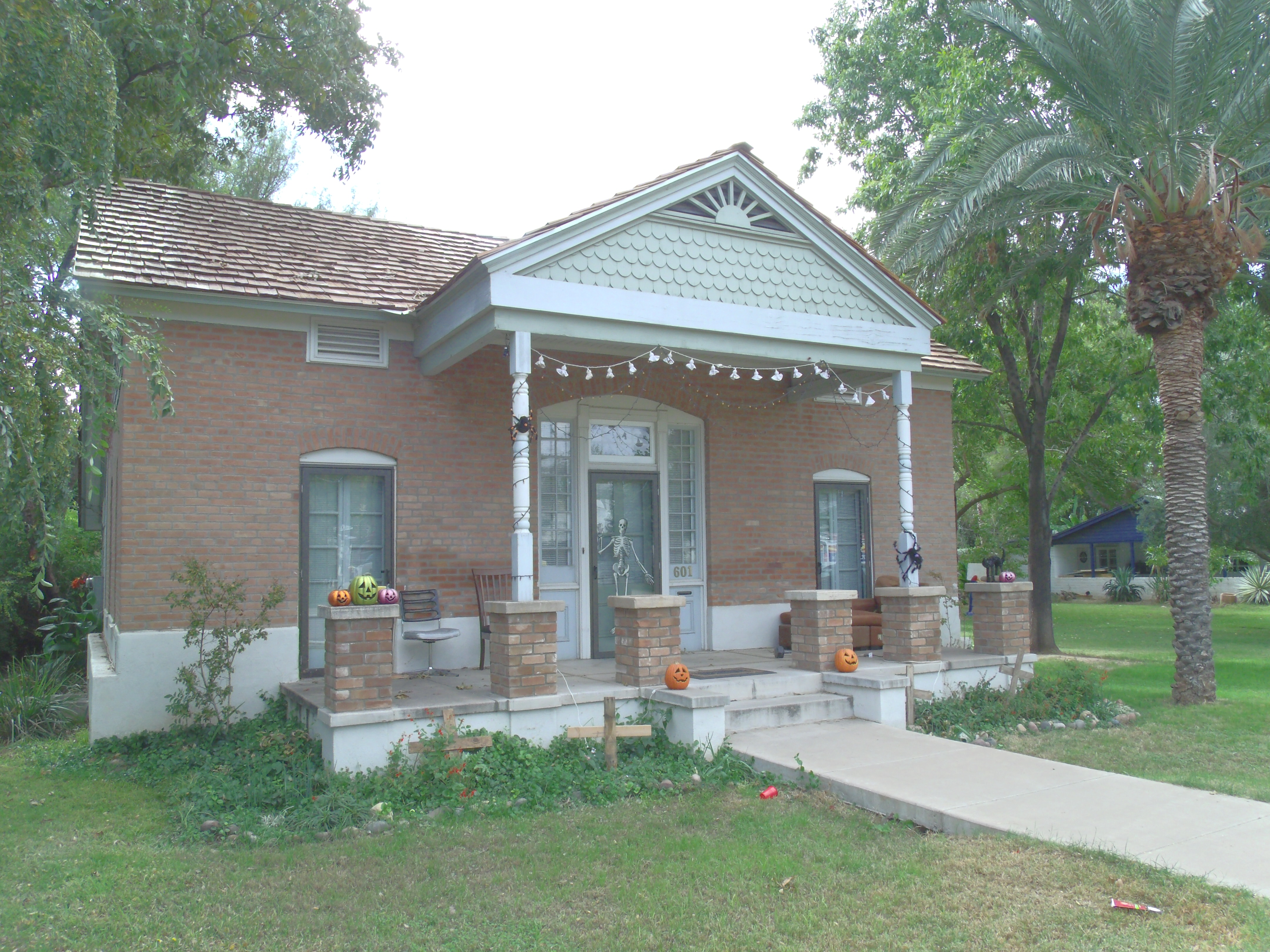
The Sampson-Tupper House .

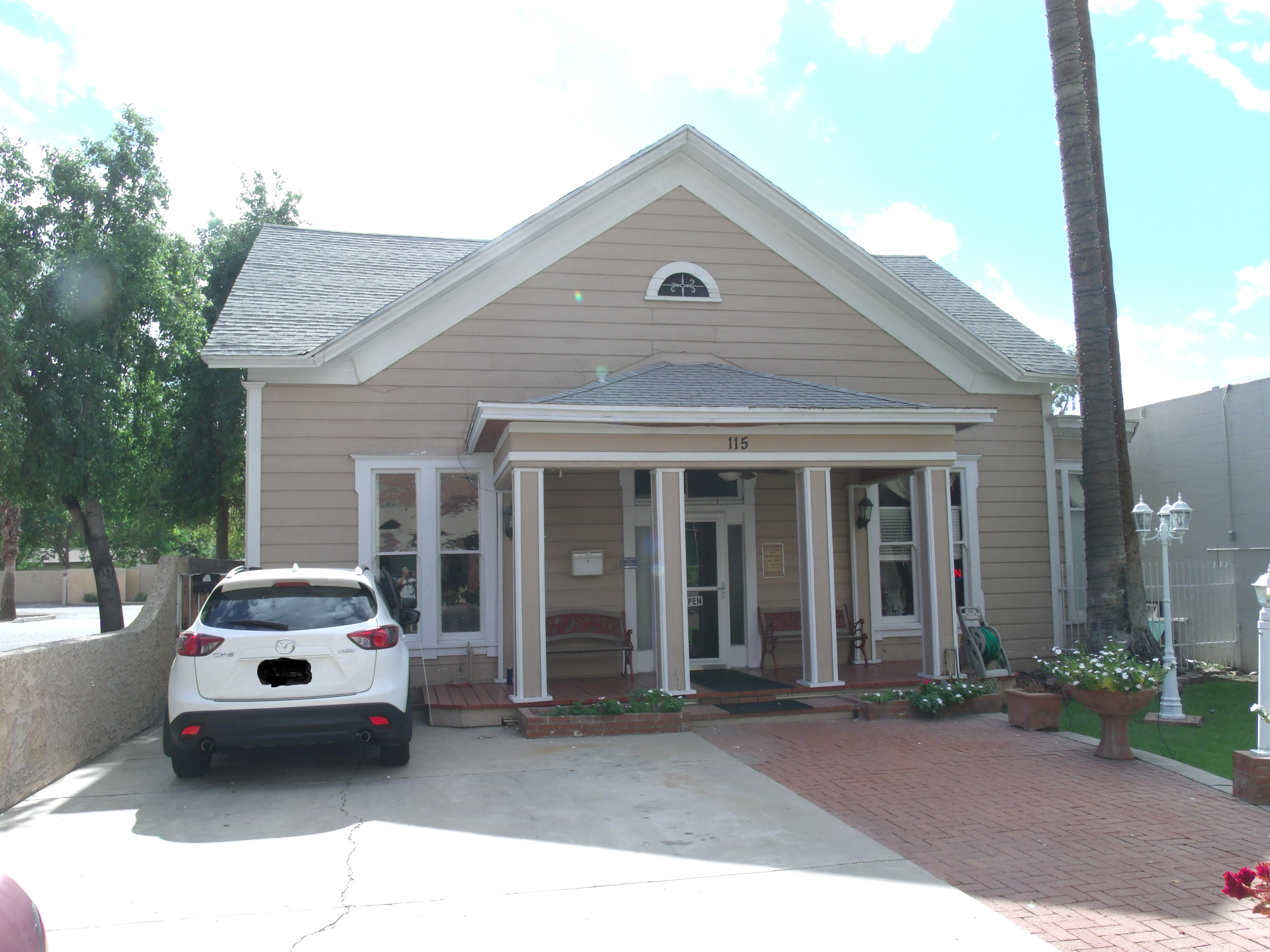
The Gage House .

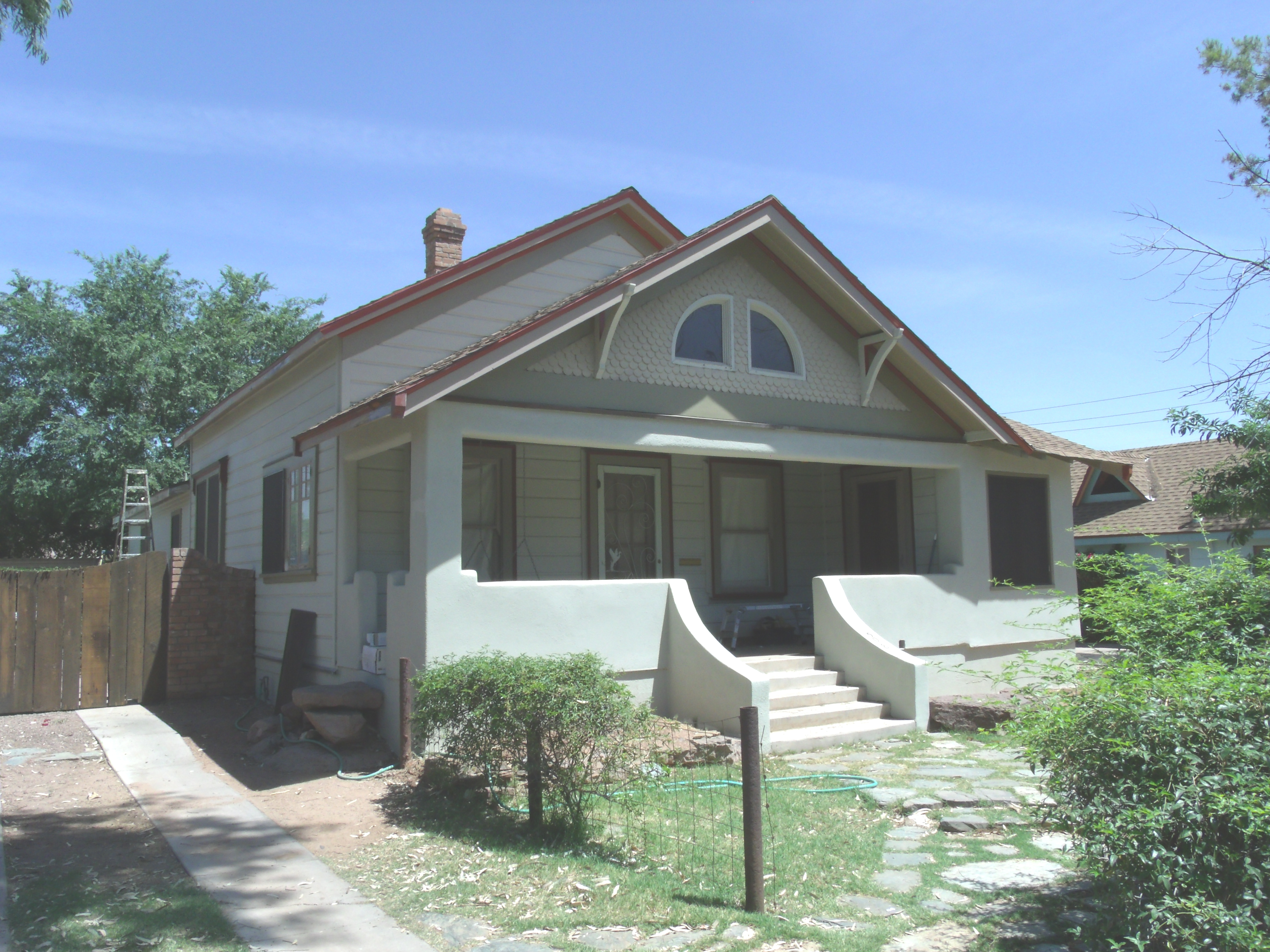
The Dines-Hight House.

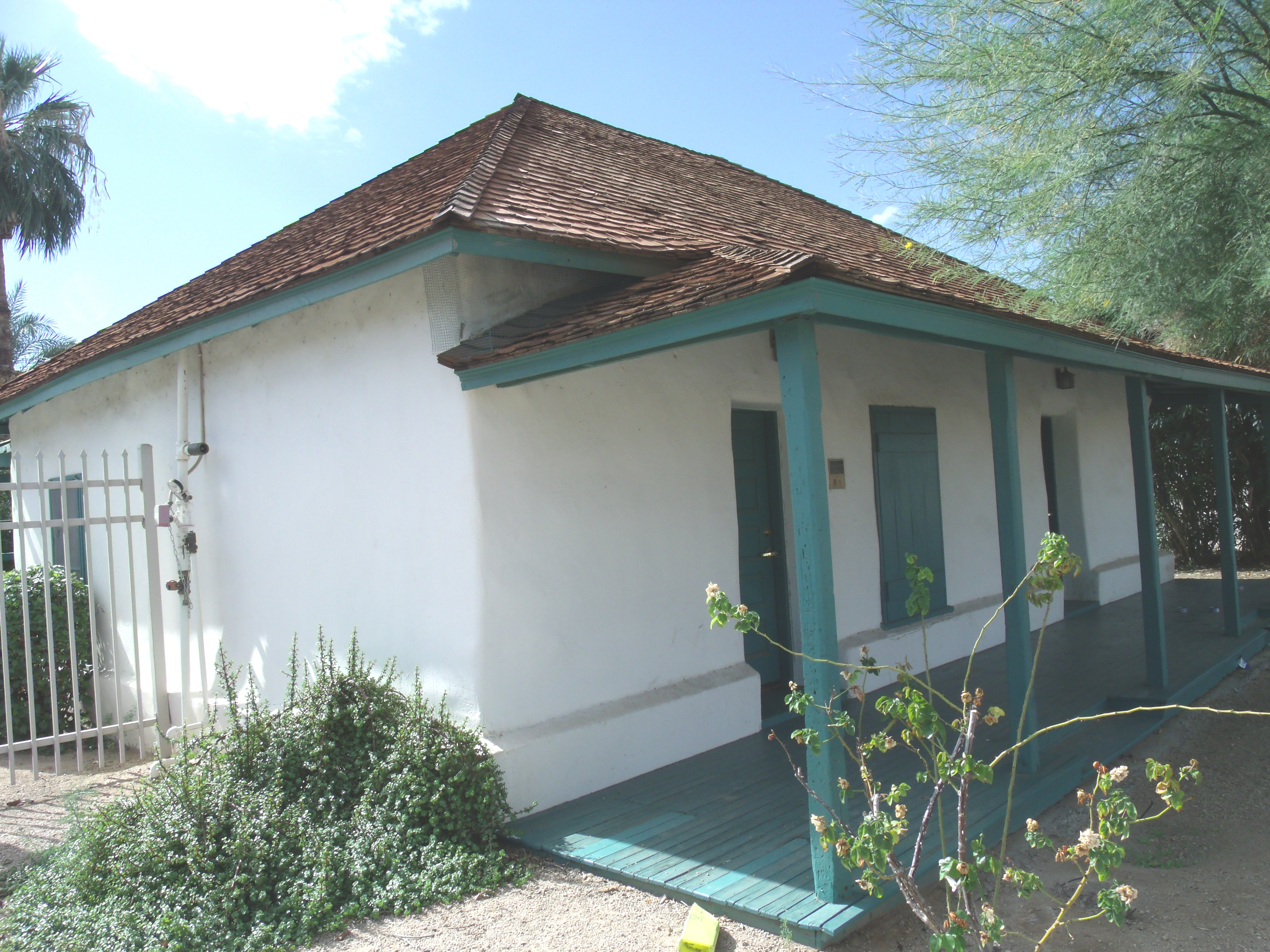
The Elias-Rodriguez House .

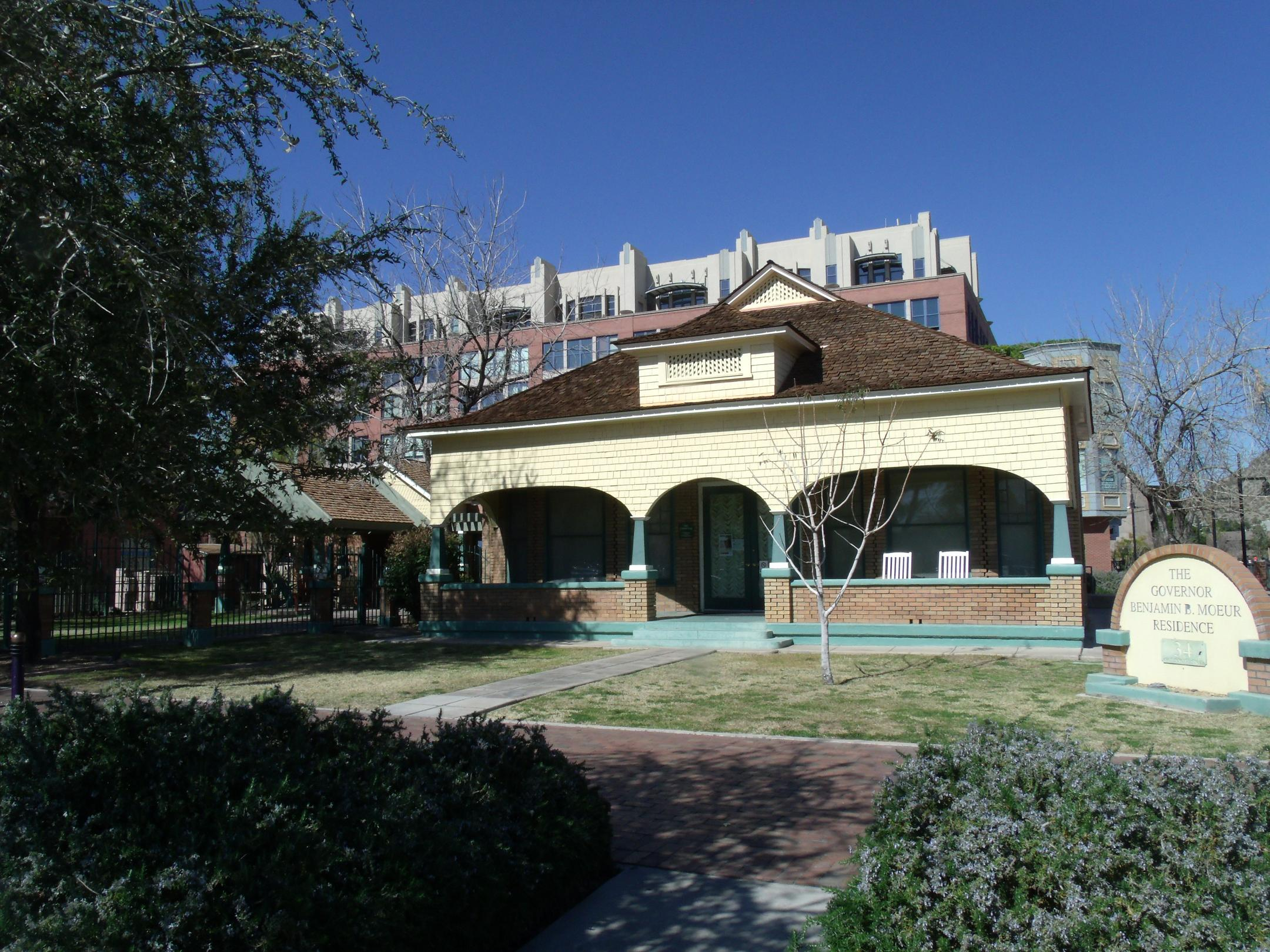
The Gov. Benjamin B. Moeur House.

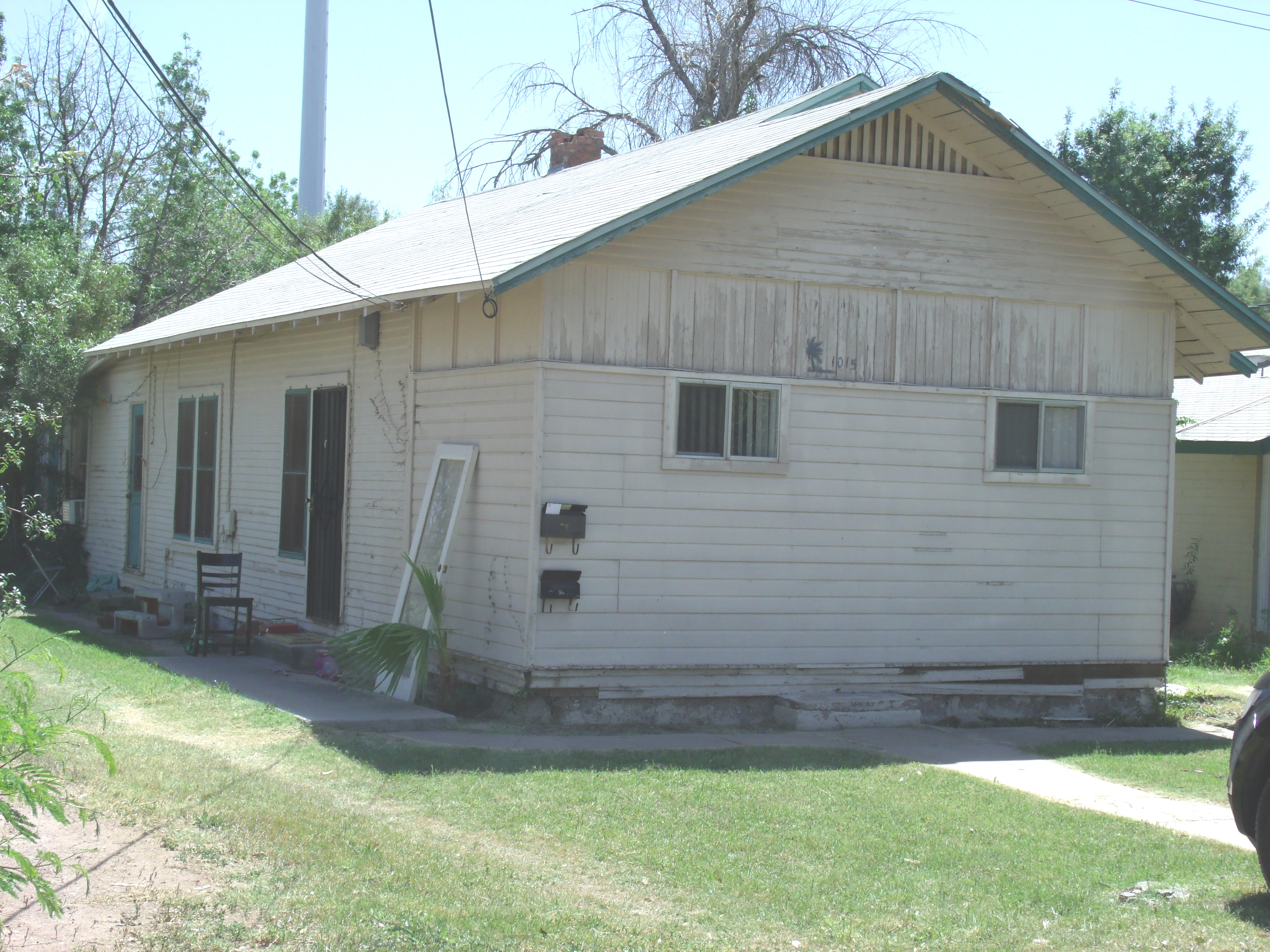
The Spear House.

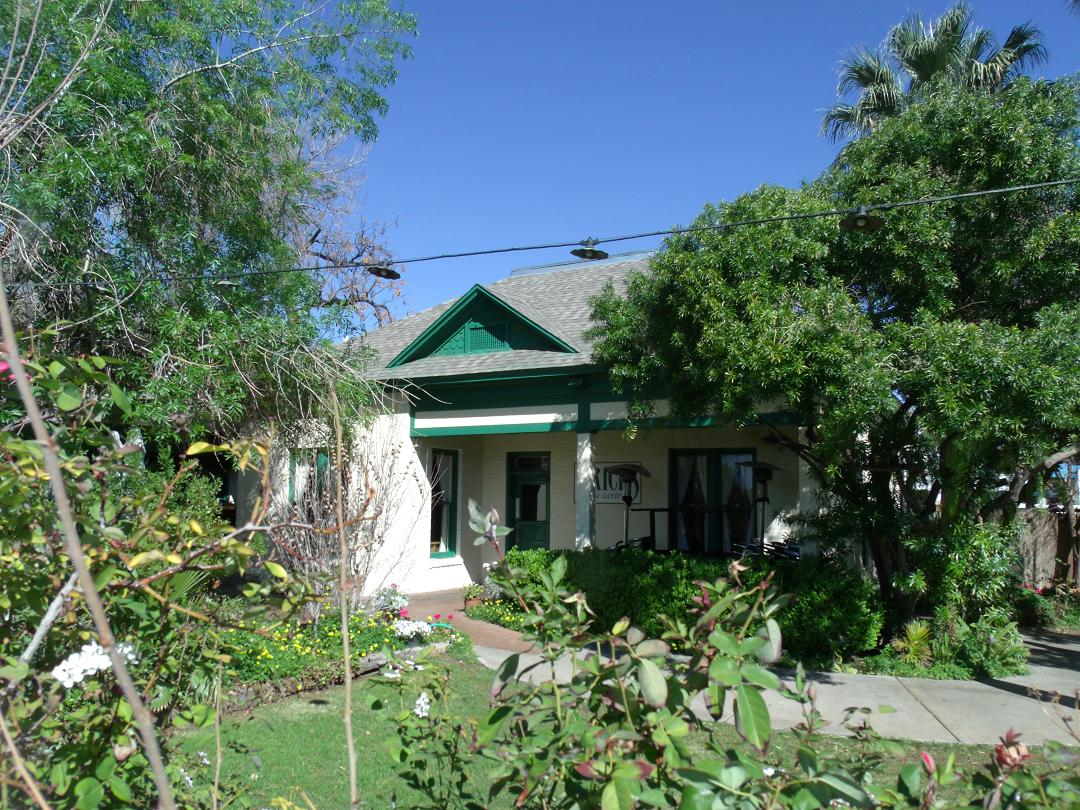
Harry Walker House.

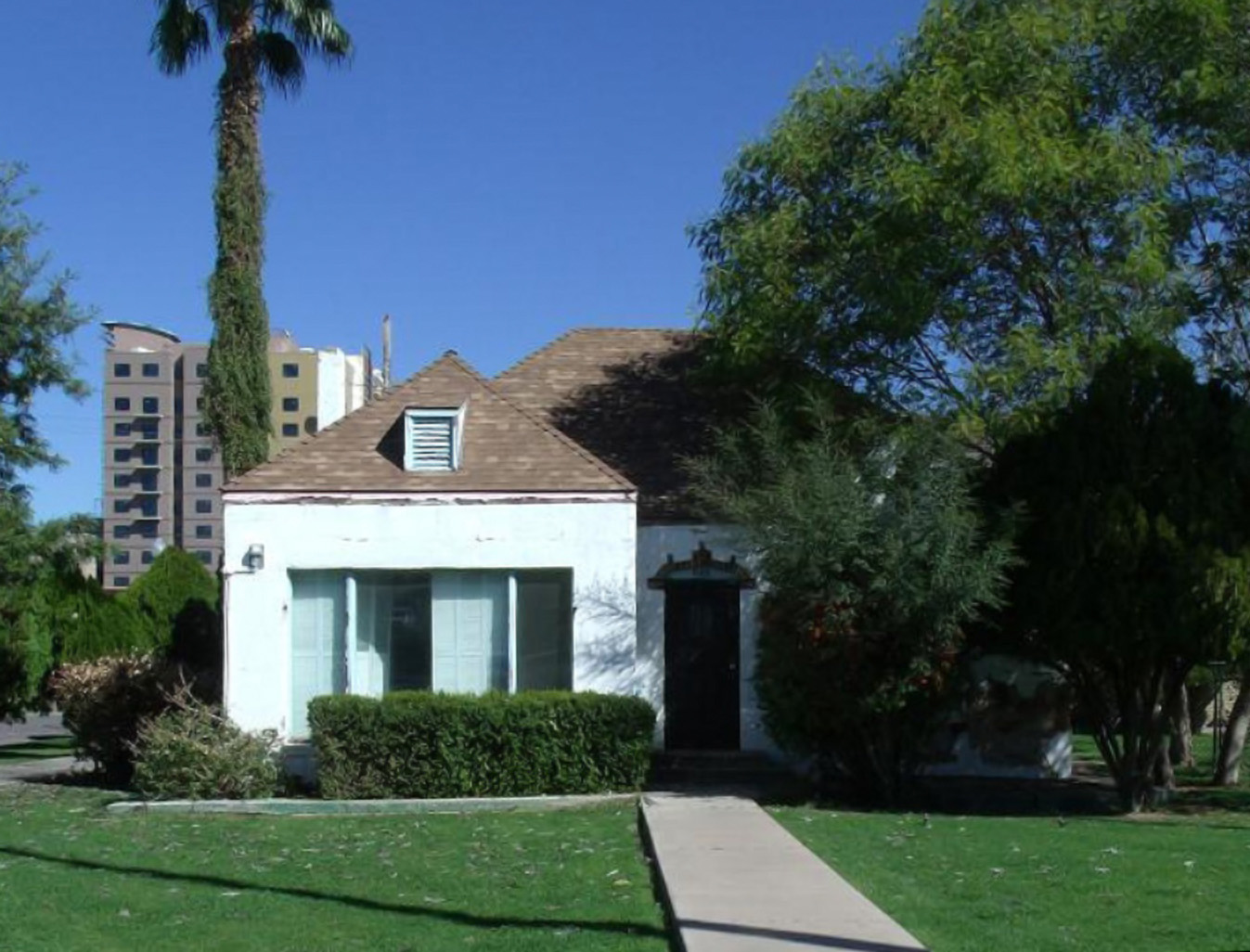
The Harrington-Birchett House.

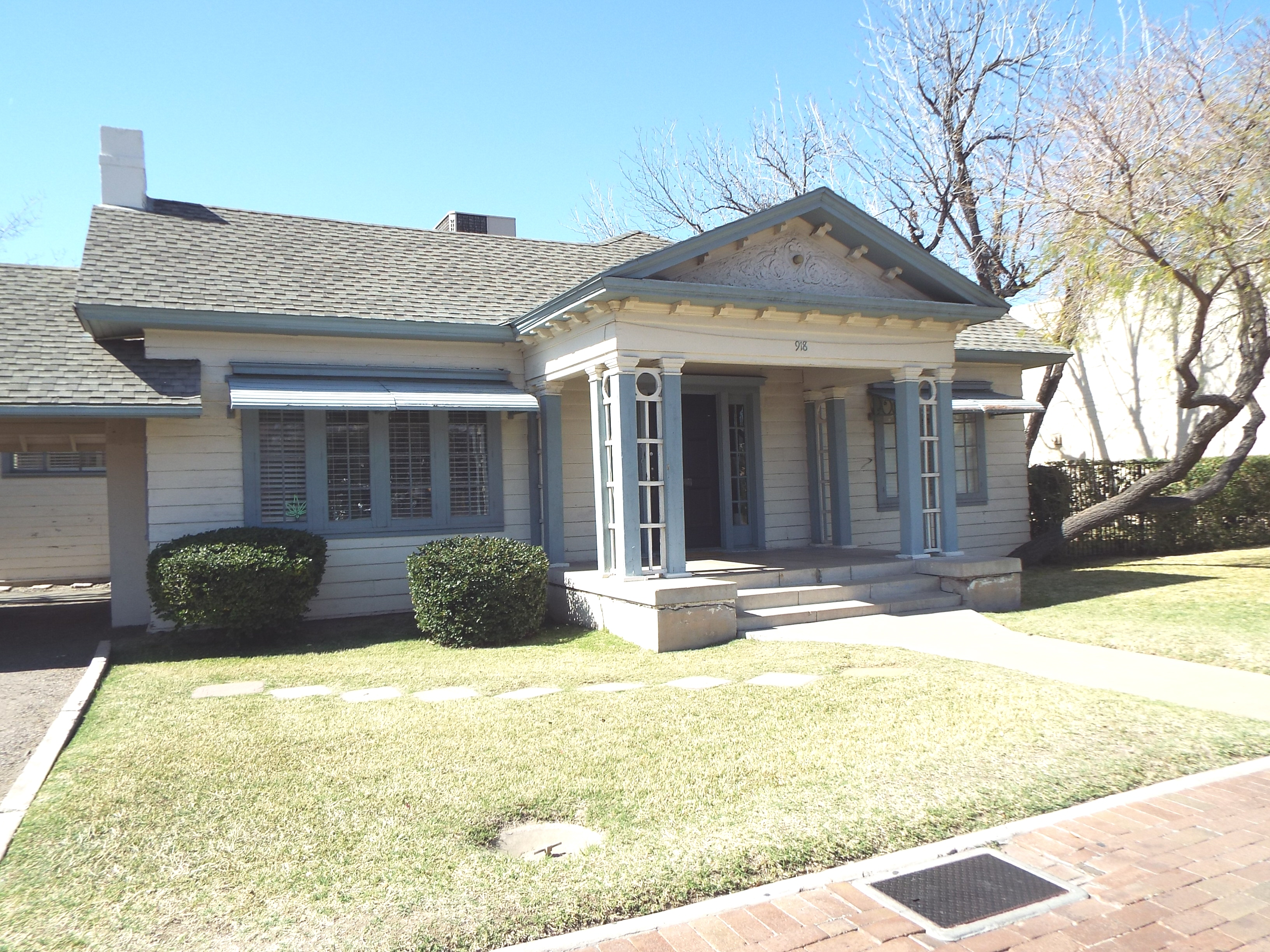
The C.P. Mullen House, a.k.a. D. R. Van Petten House .

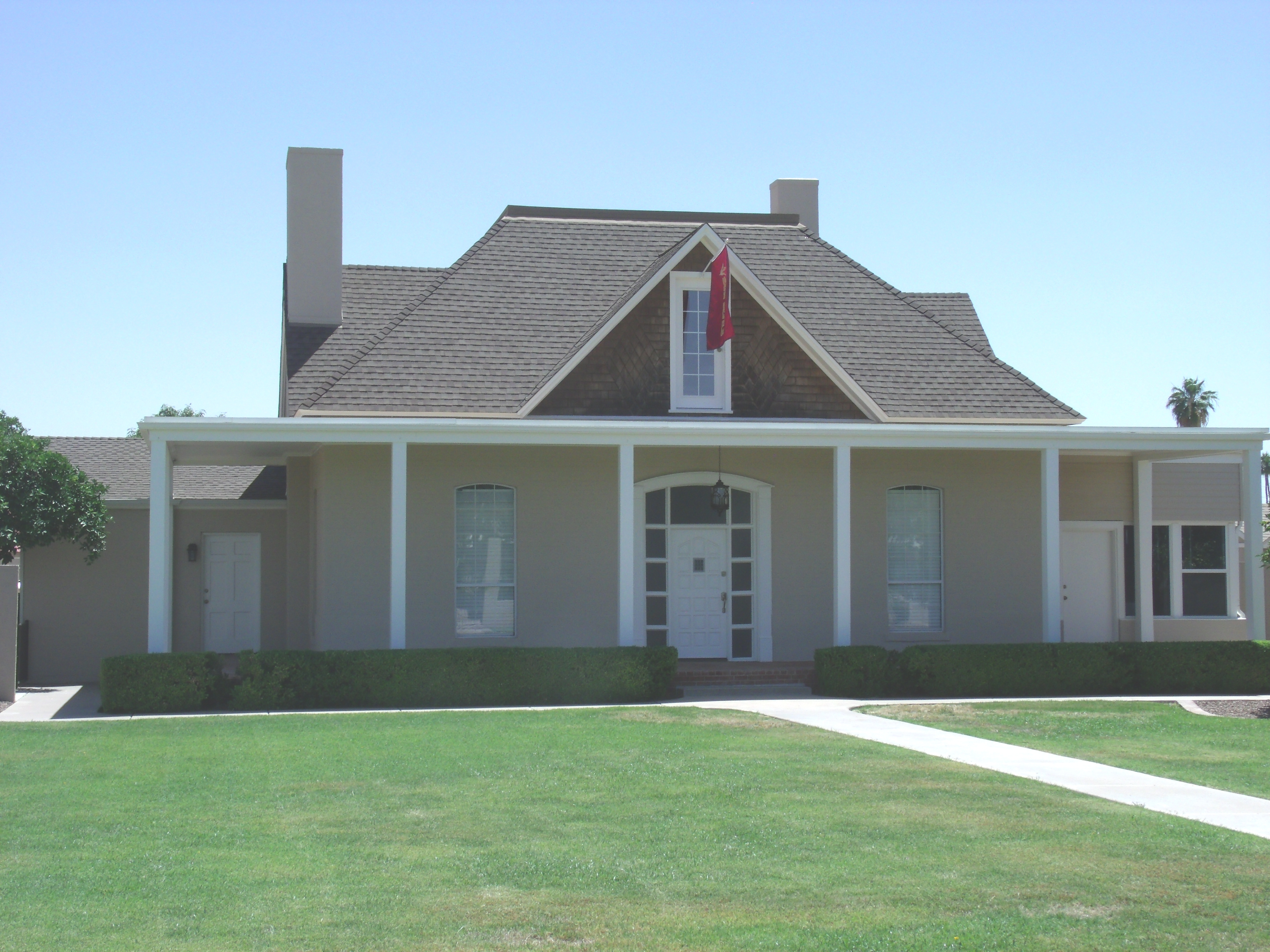
The Morrow-Hudson House.

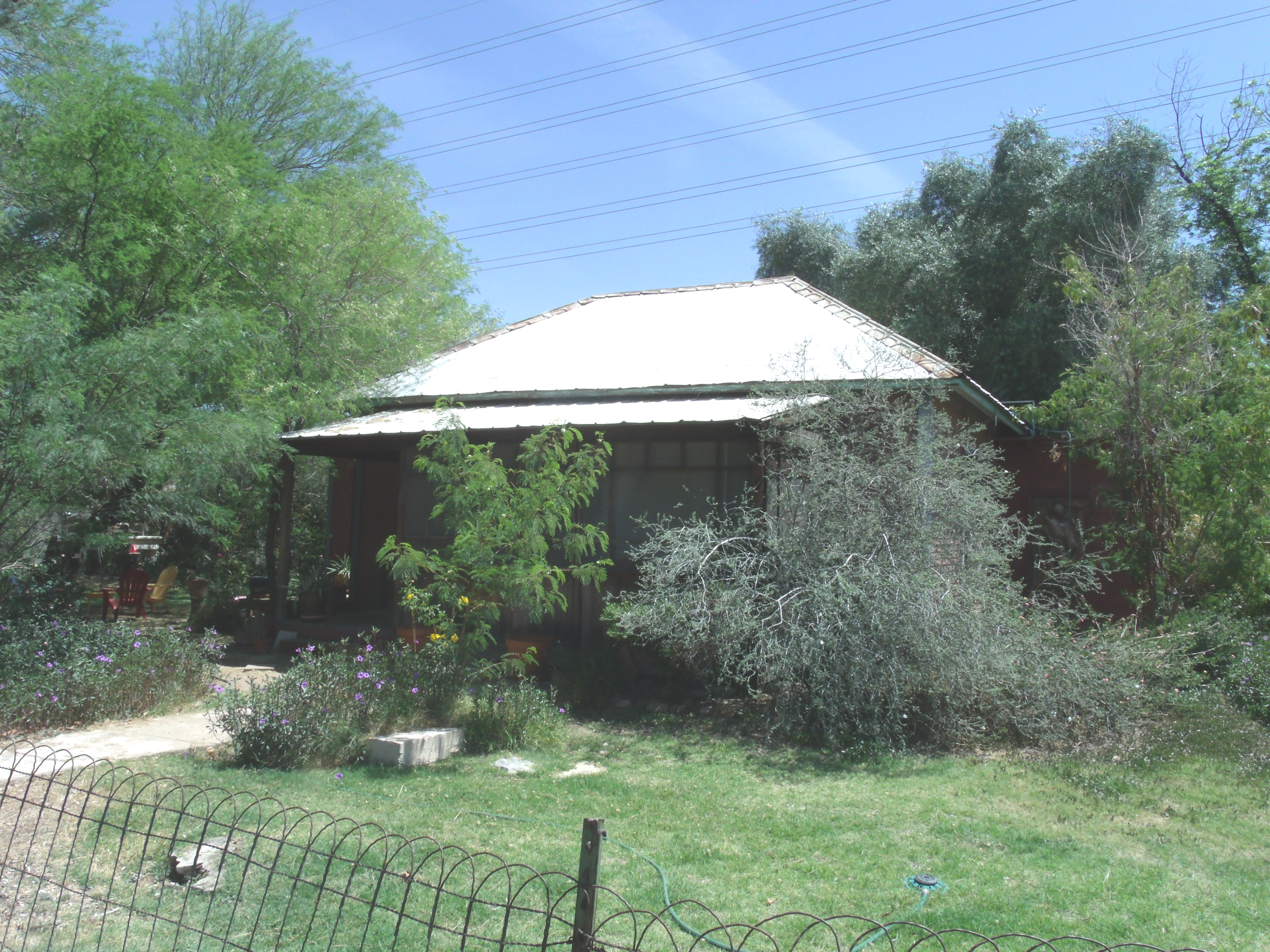
The Hugh Laird House.

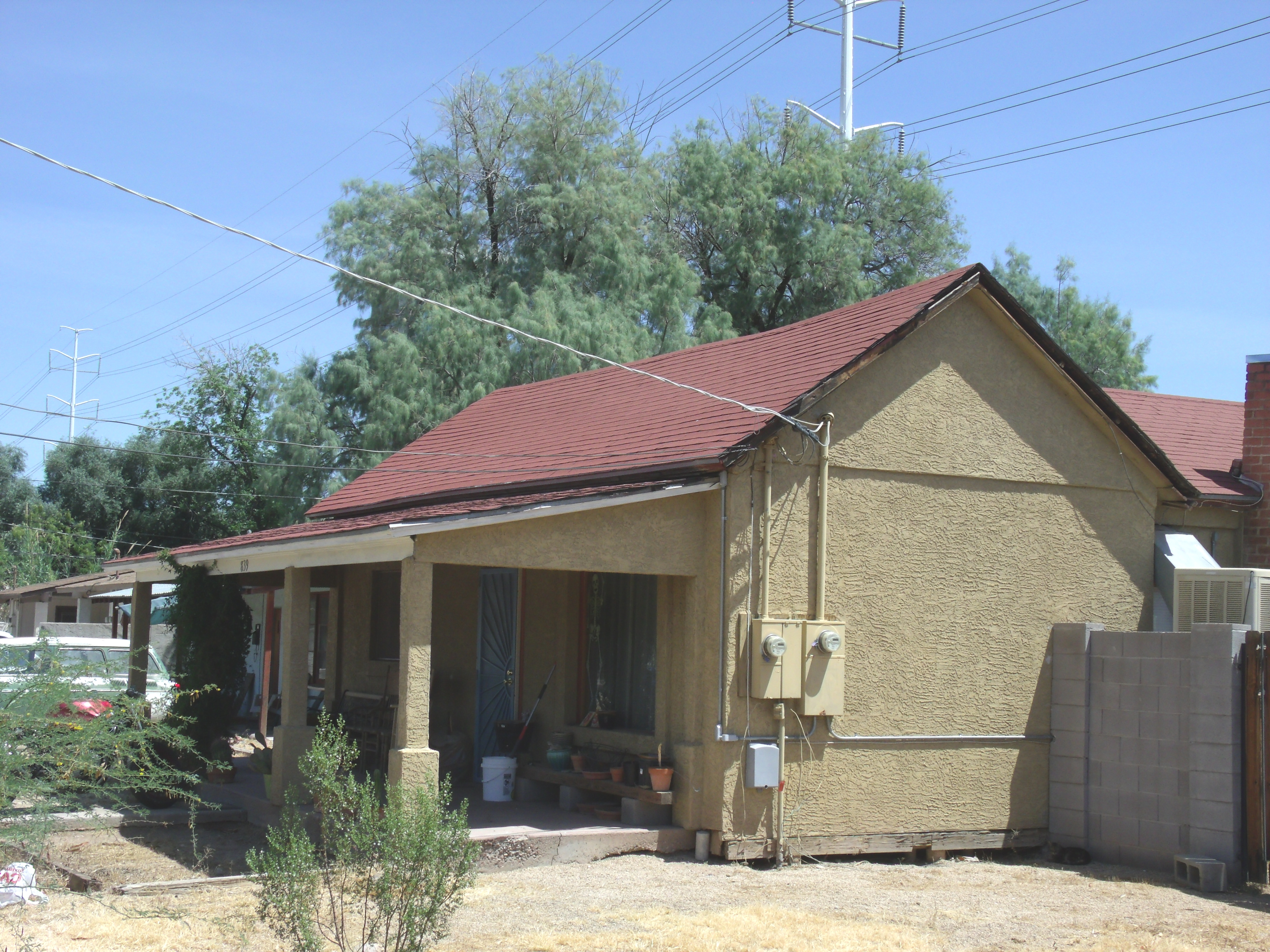
The Cummins House.

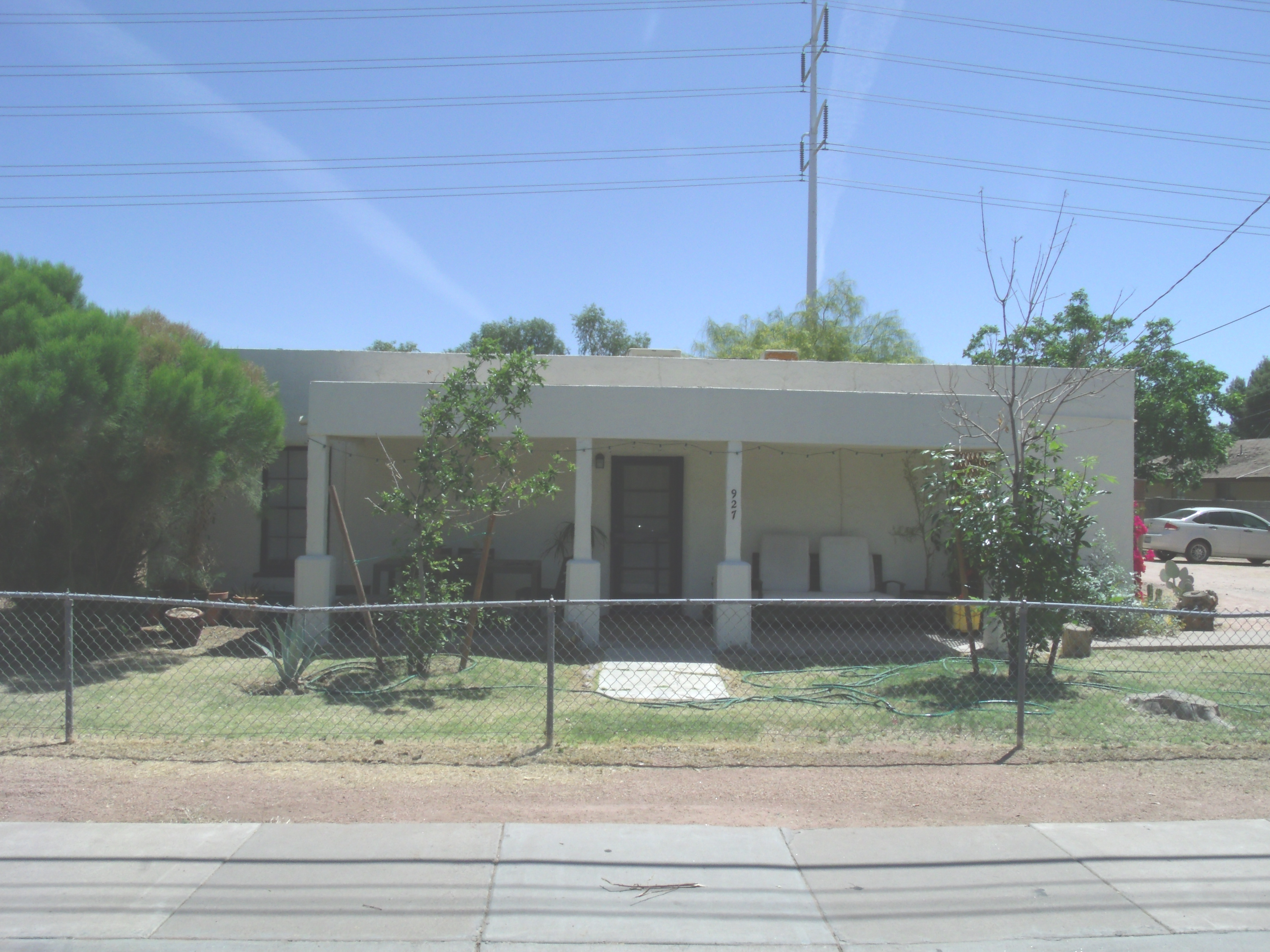
The Chavez House.

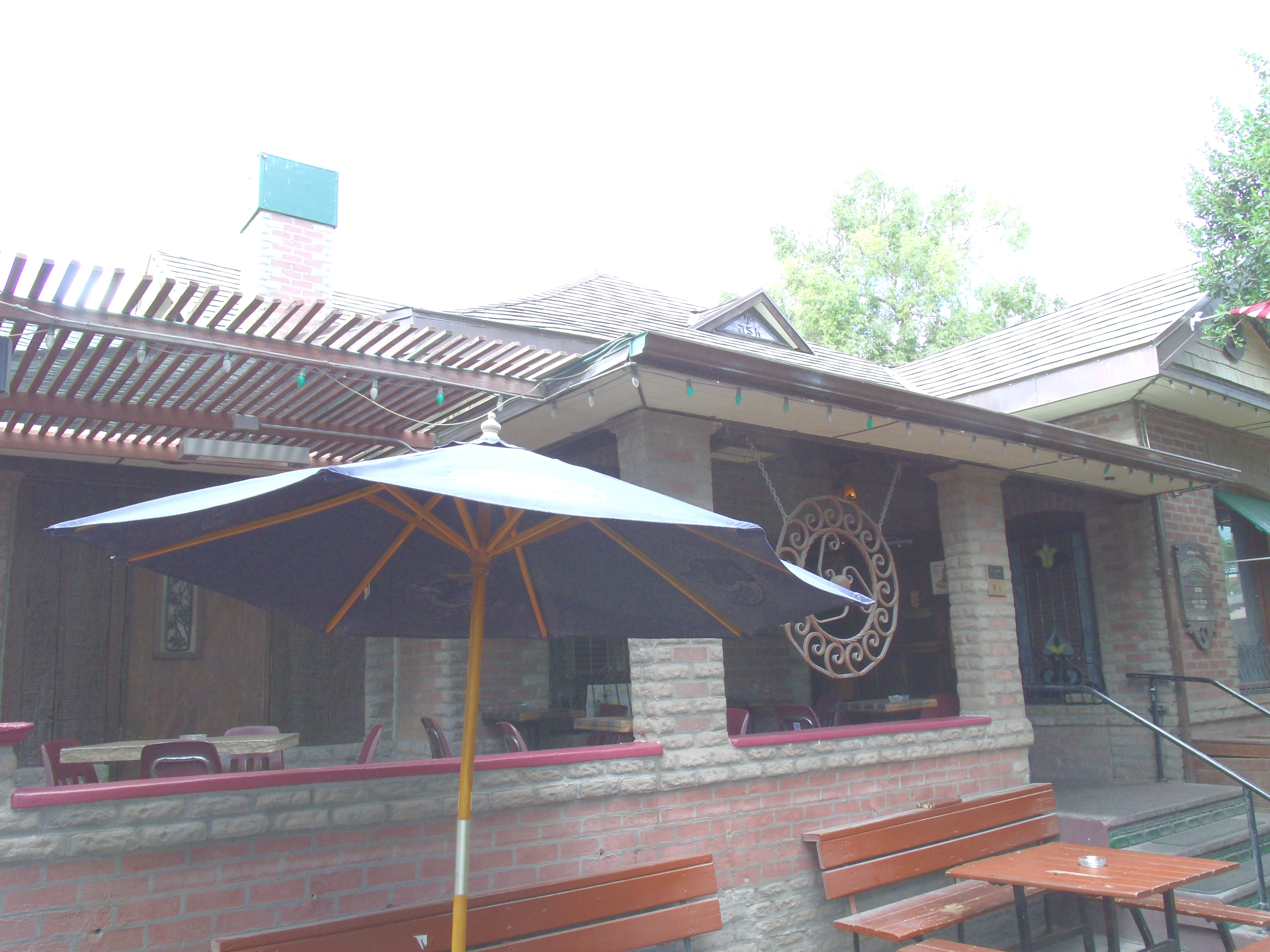
The W.A. Moeur House .

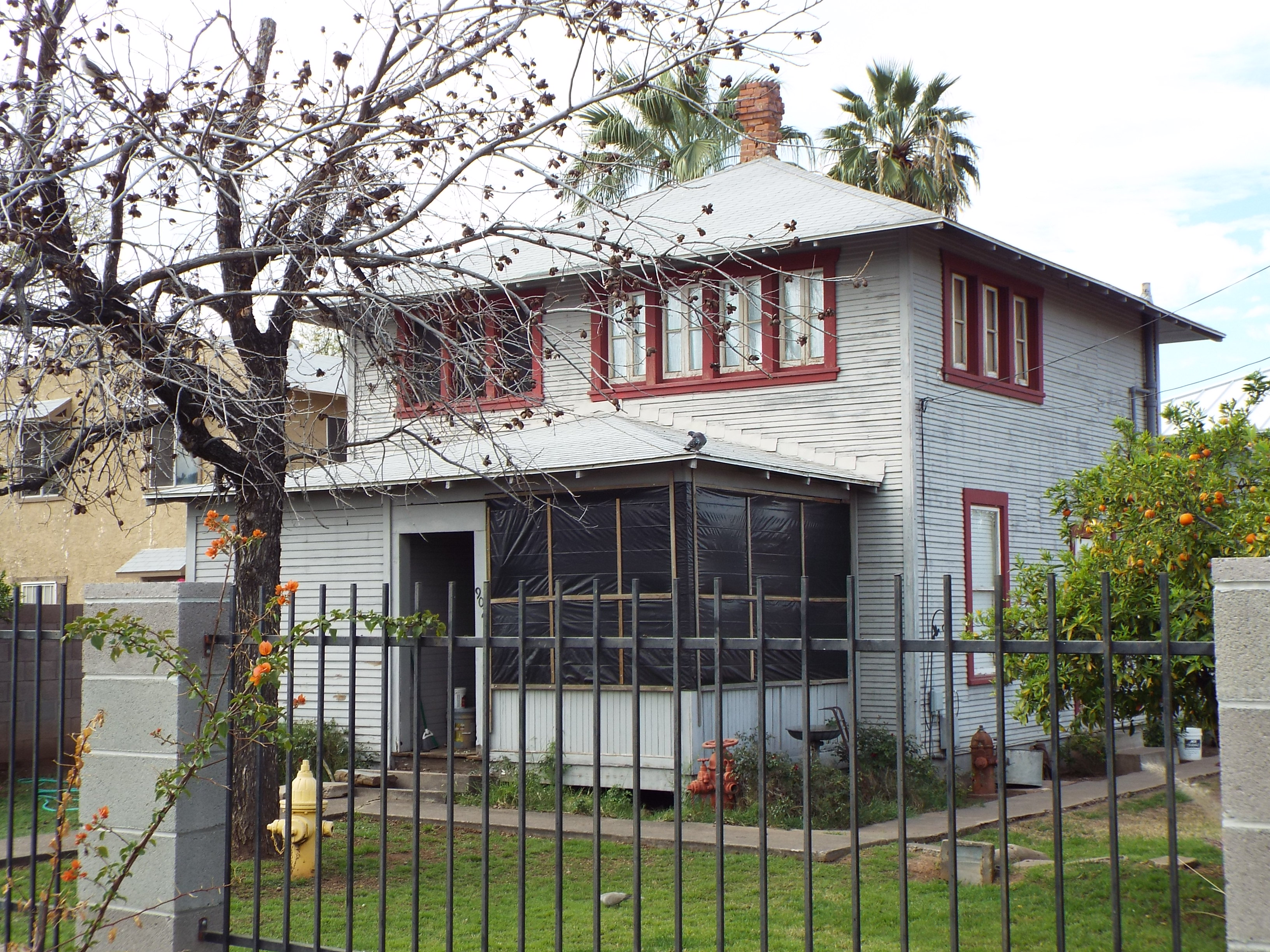
The Carns- Buck House .

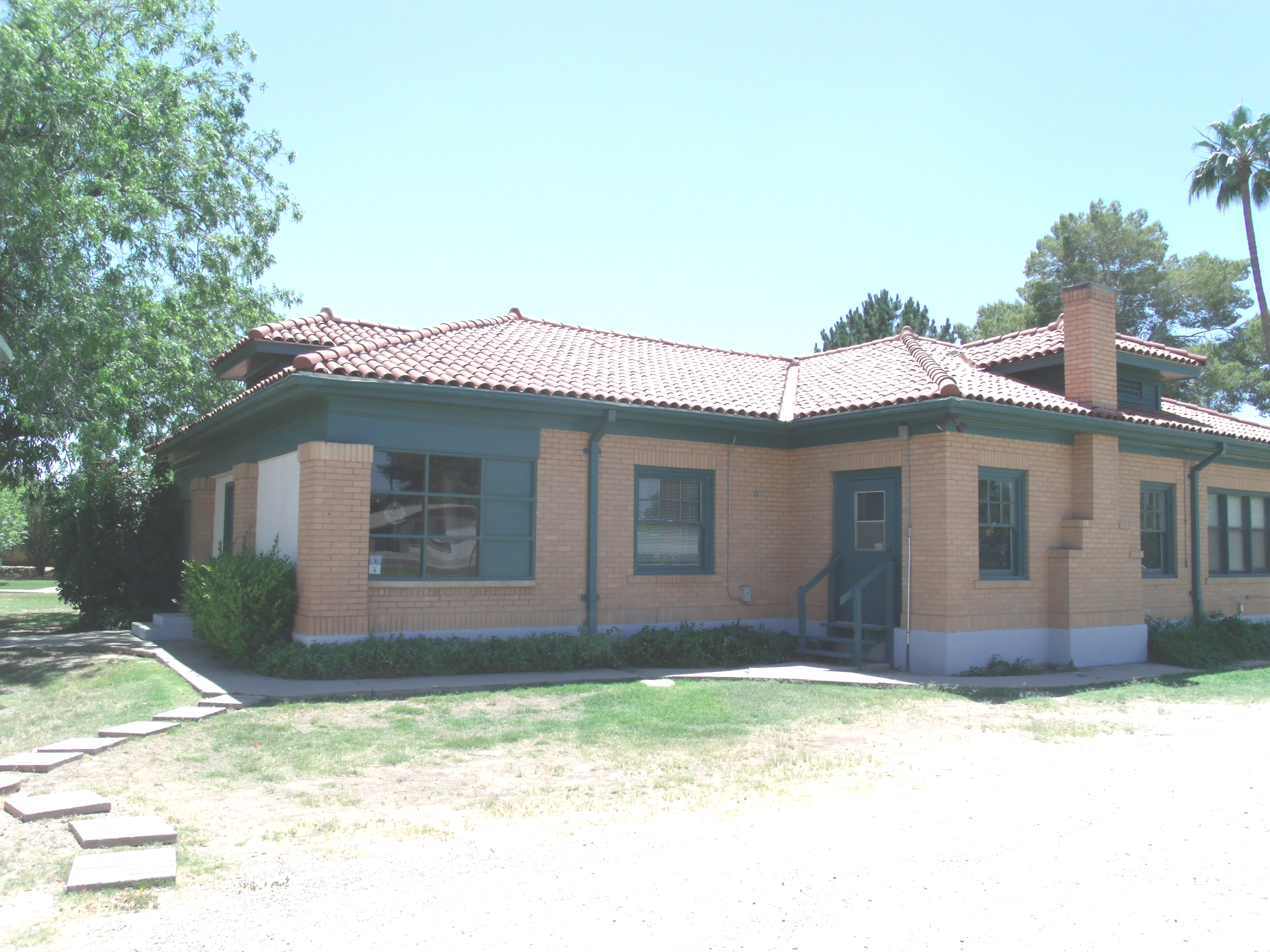
The D.J. Frankenberg House.

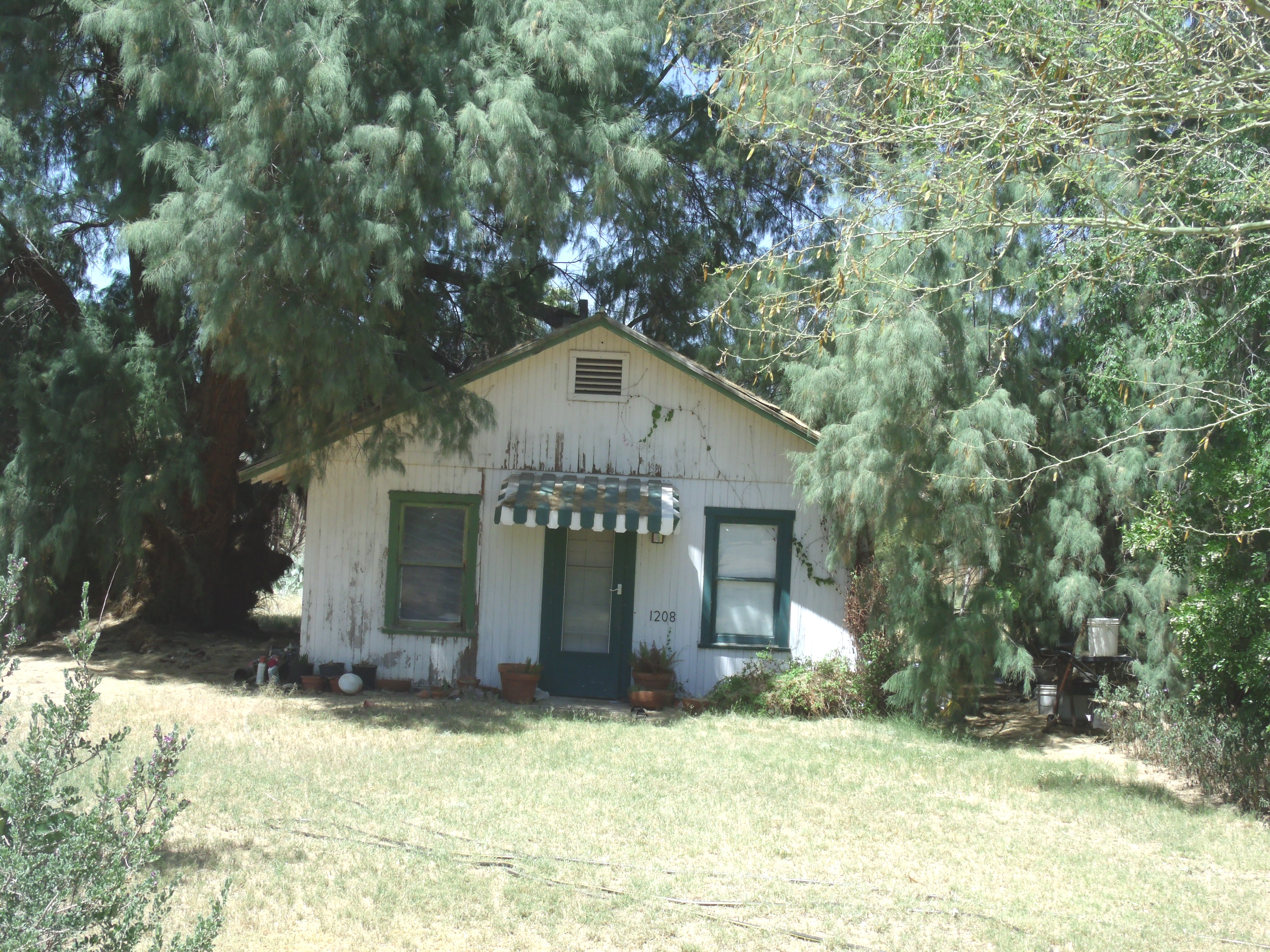
The Judd House.

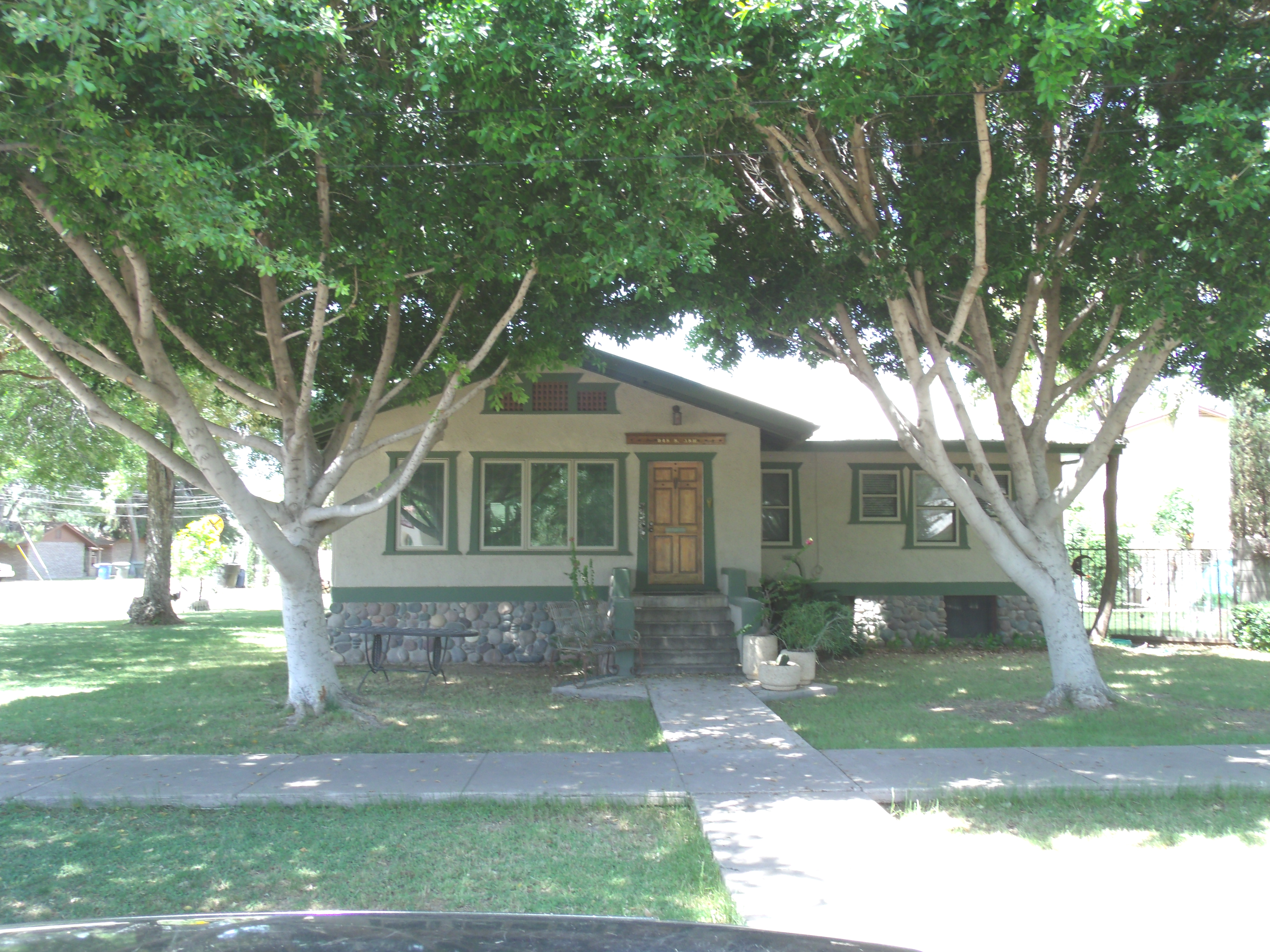
The Byron Redden House.

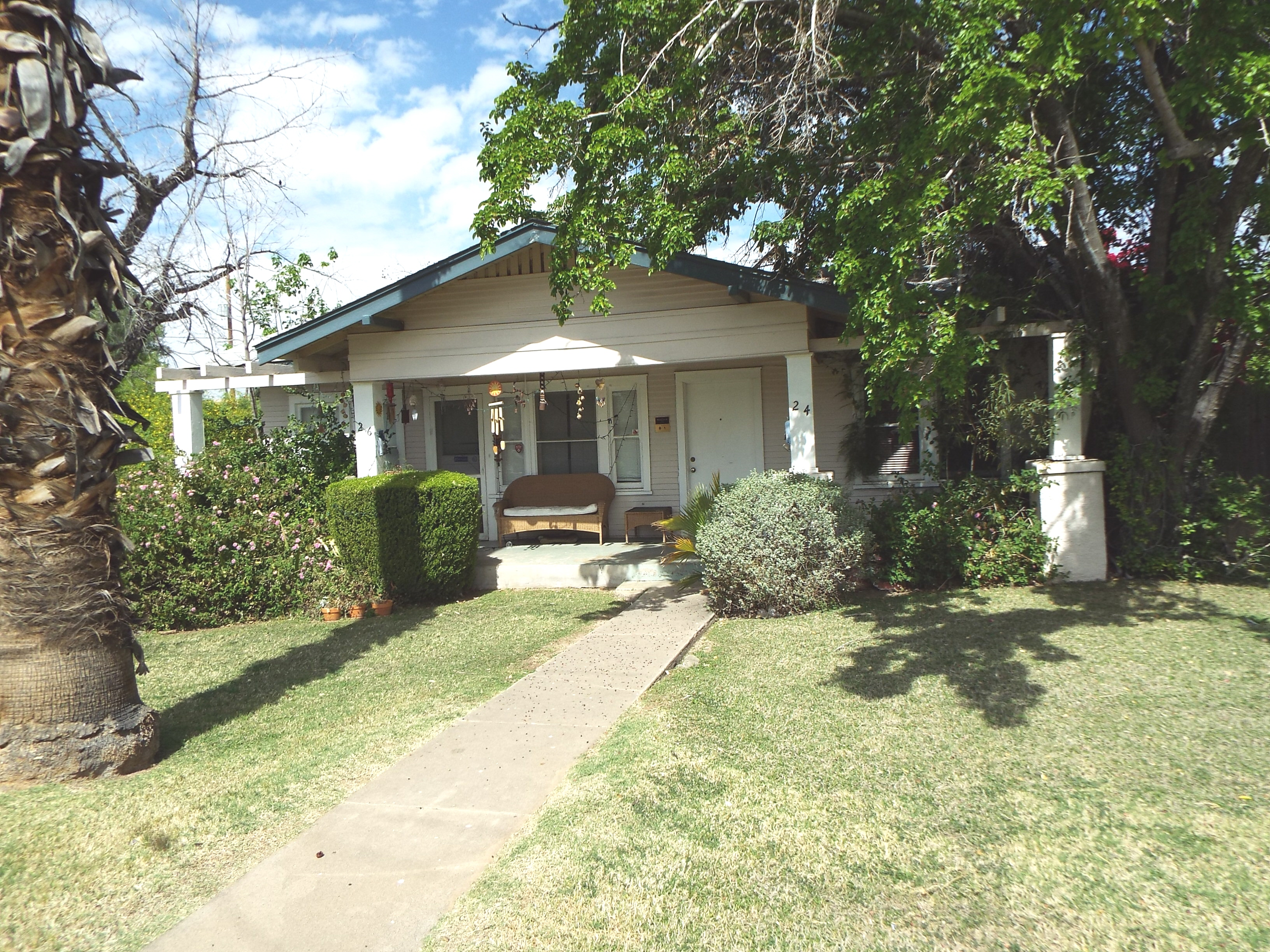
The Windes- Bell House .

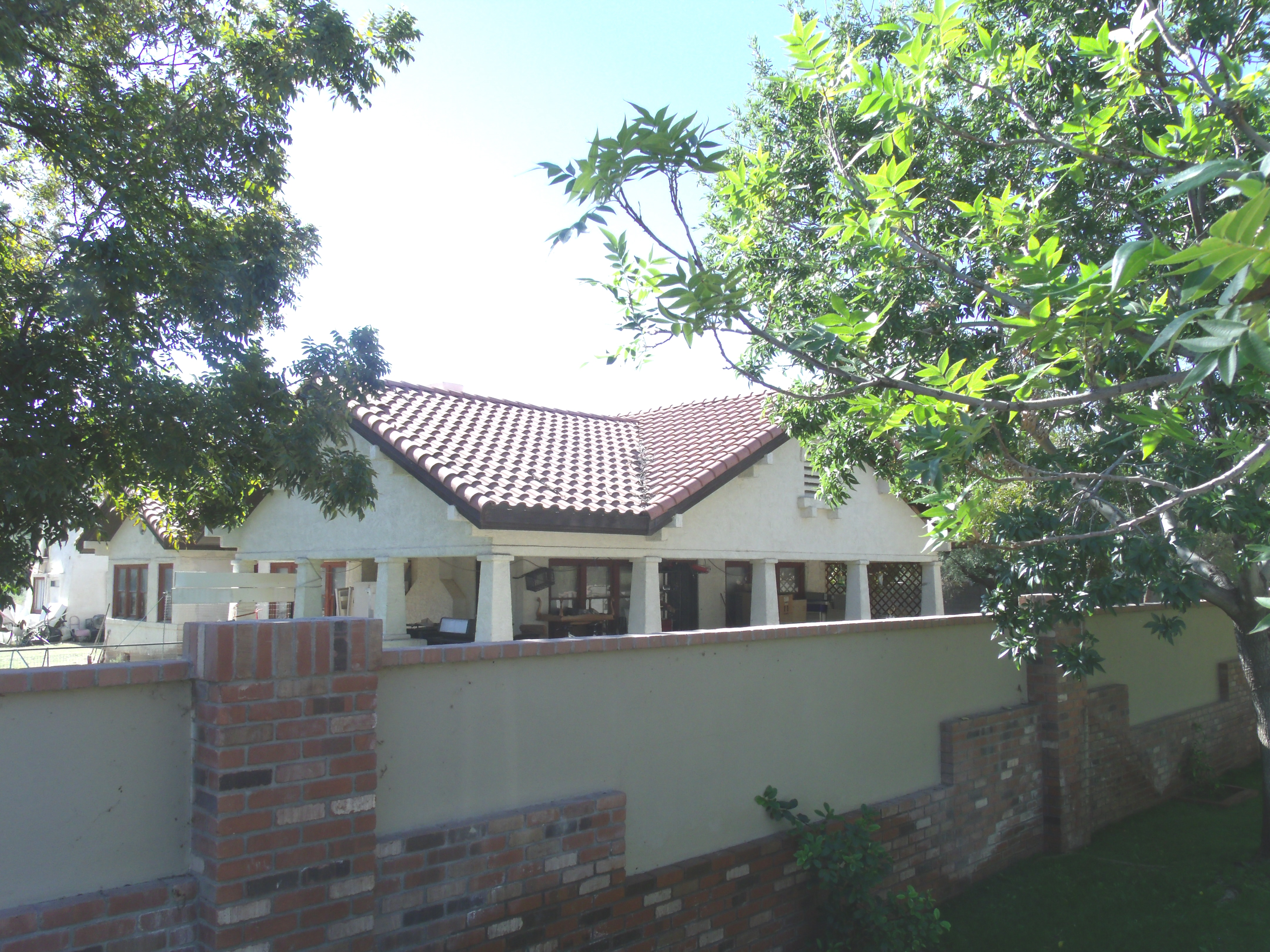
The Lowell Redden House .

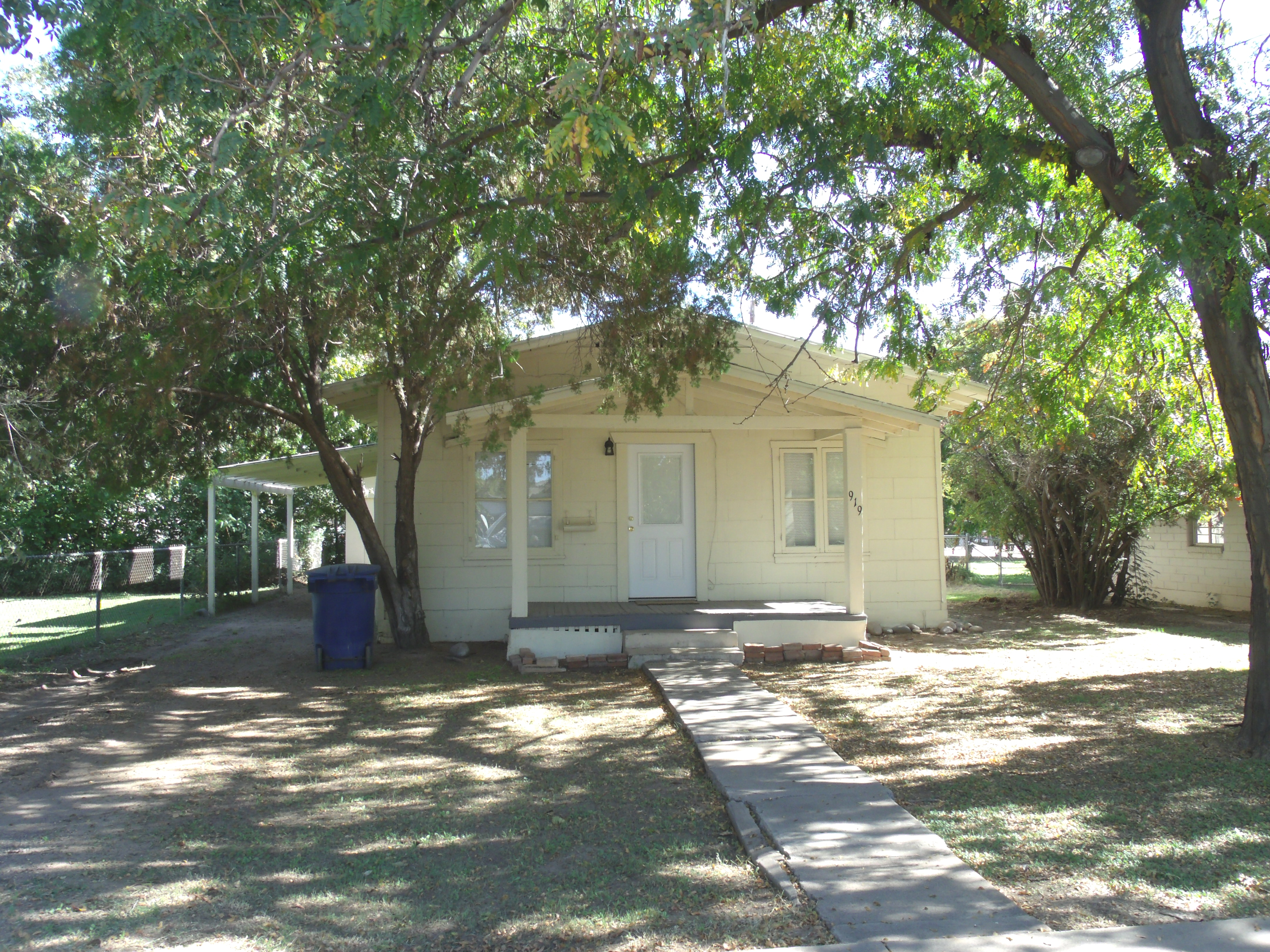
The B.H. Scudder Rental House.

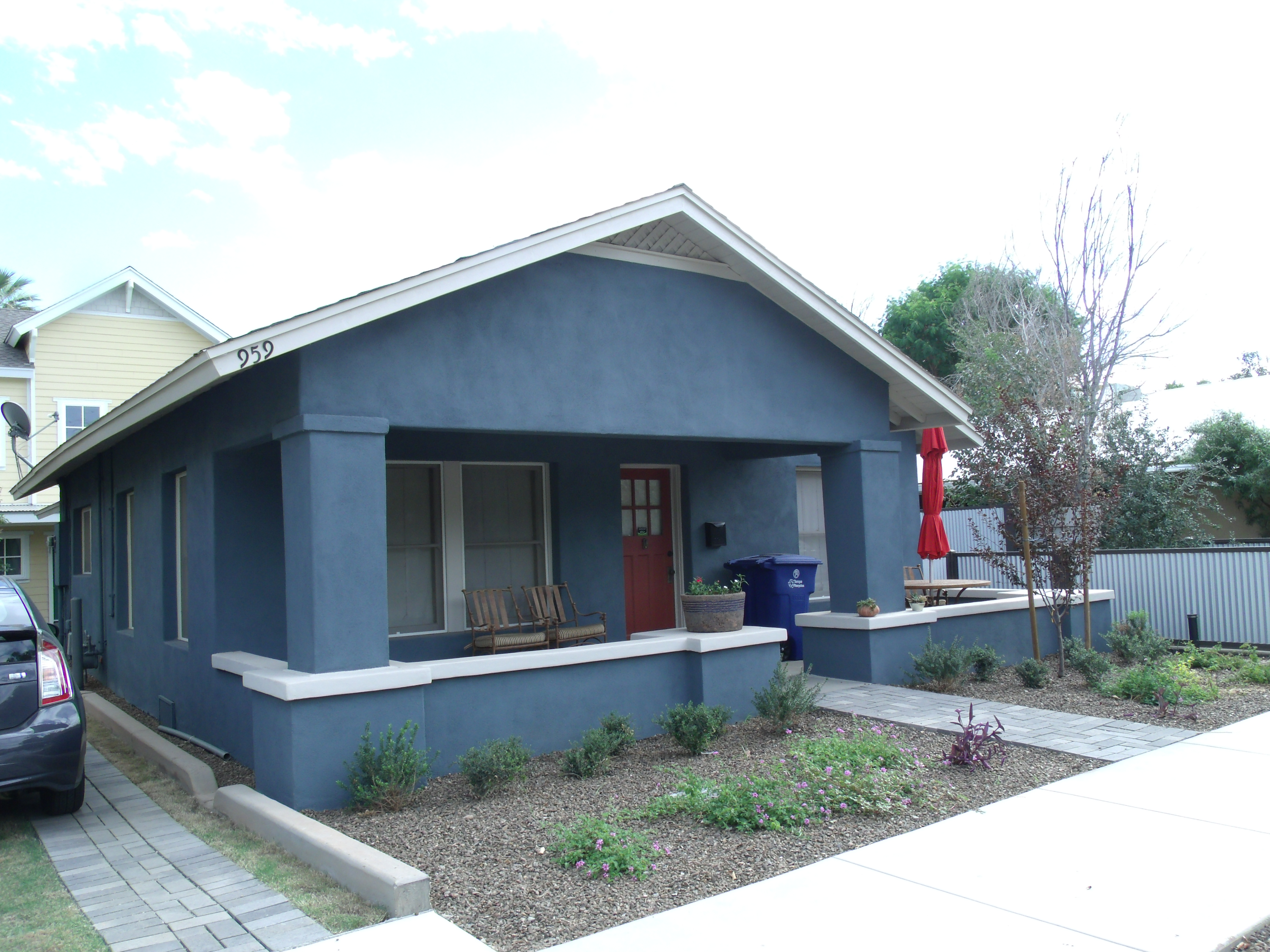
The Scudder House .

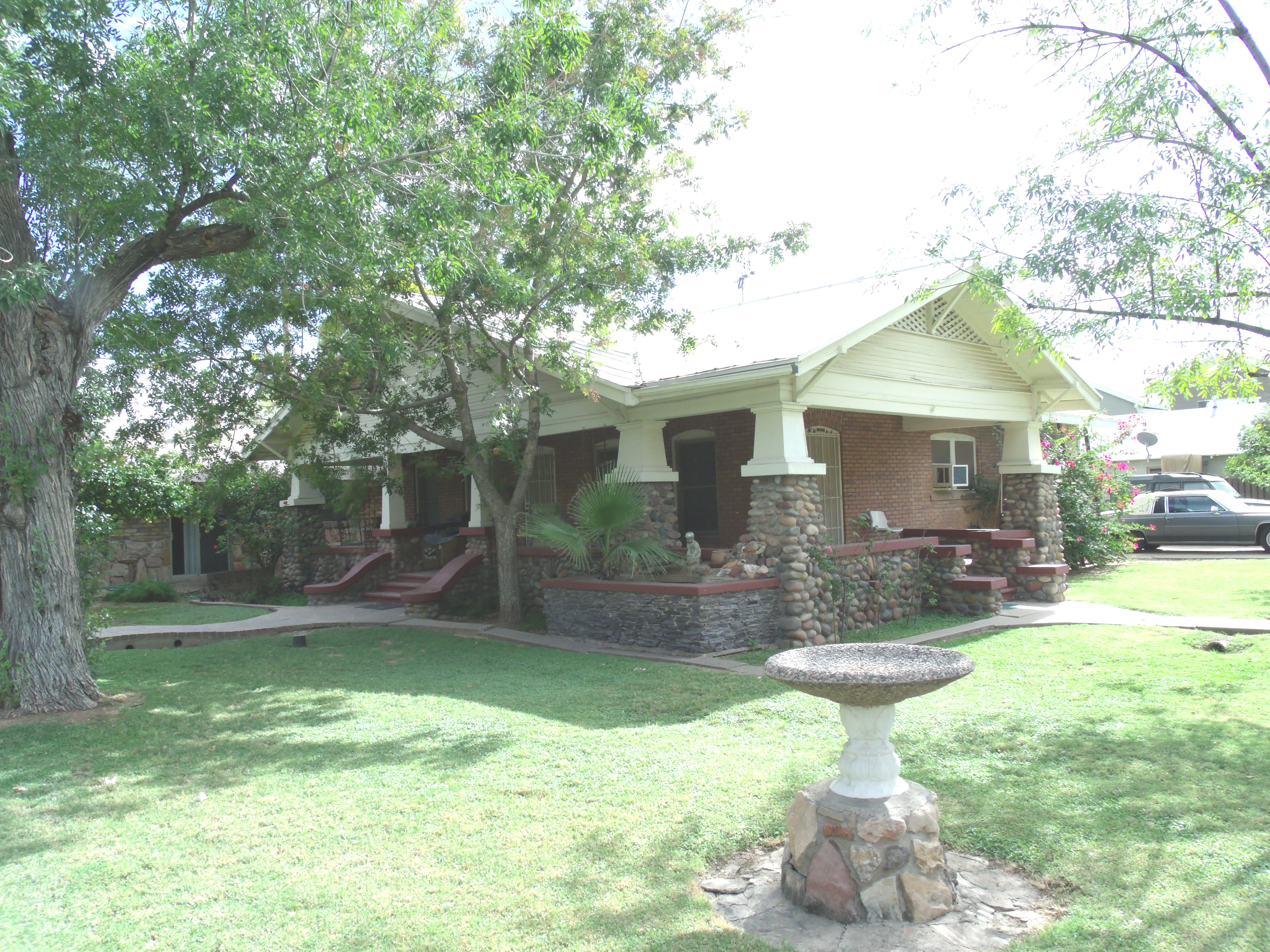
The Sidney B. Moeur House .

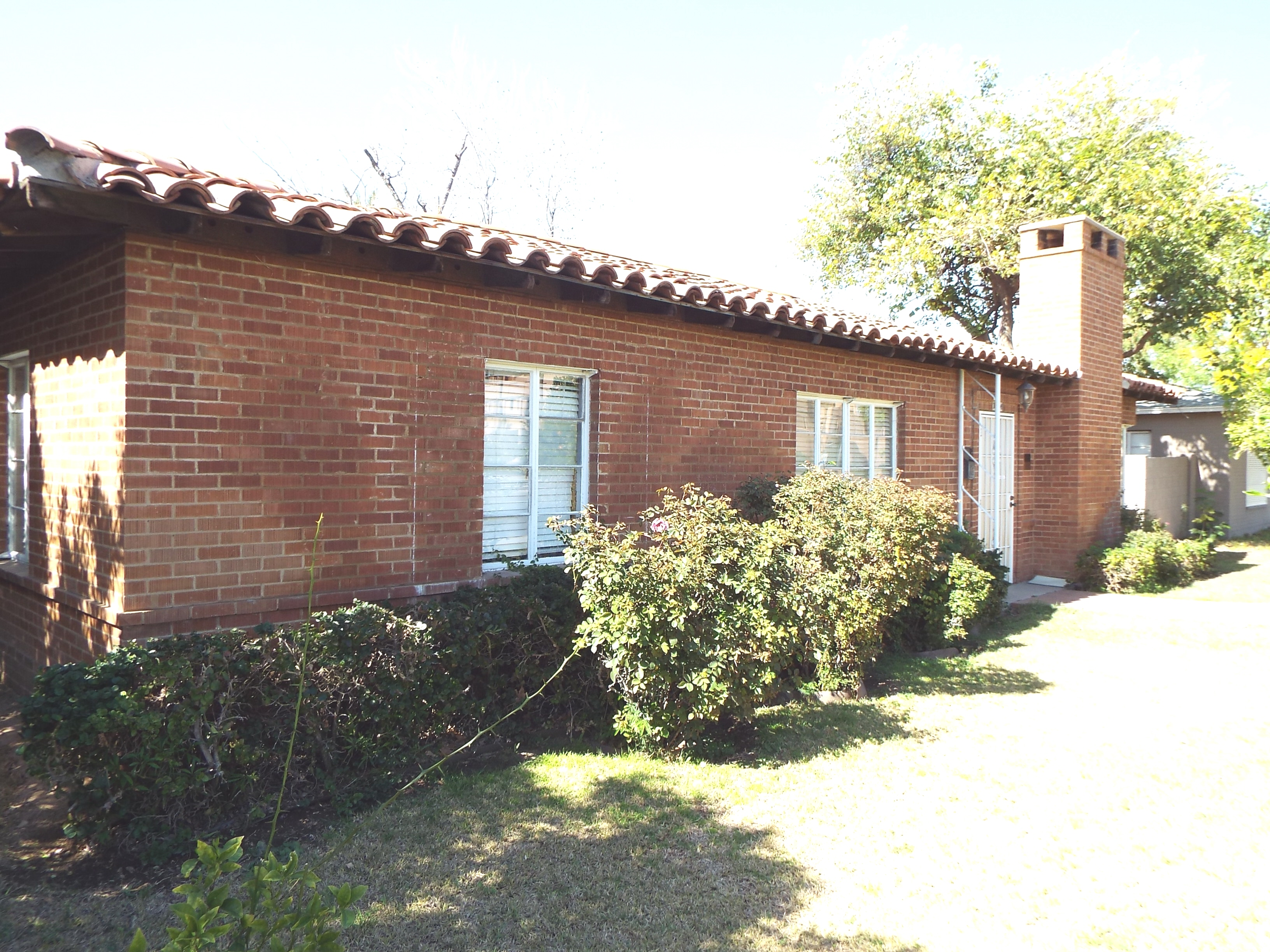
The Selleh House .

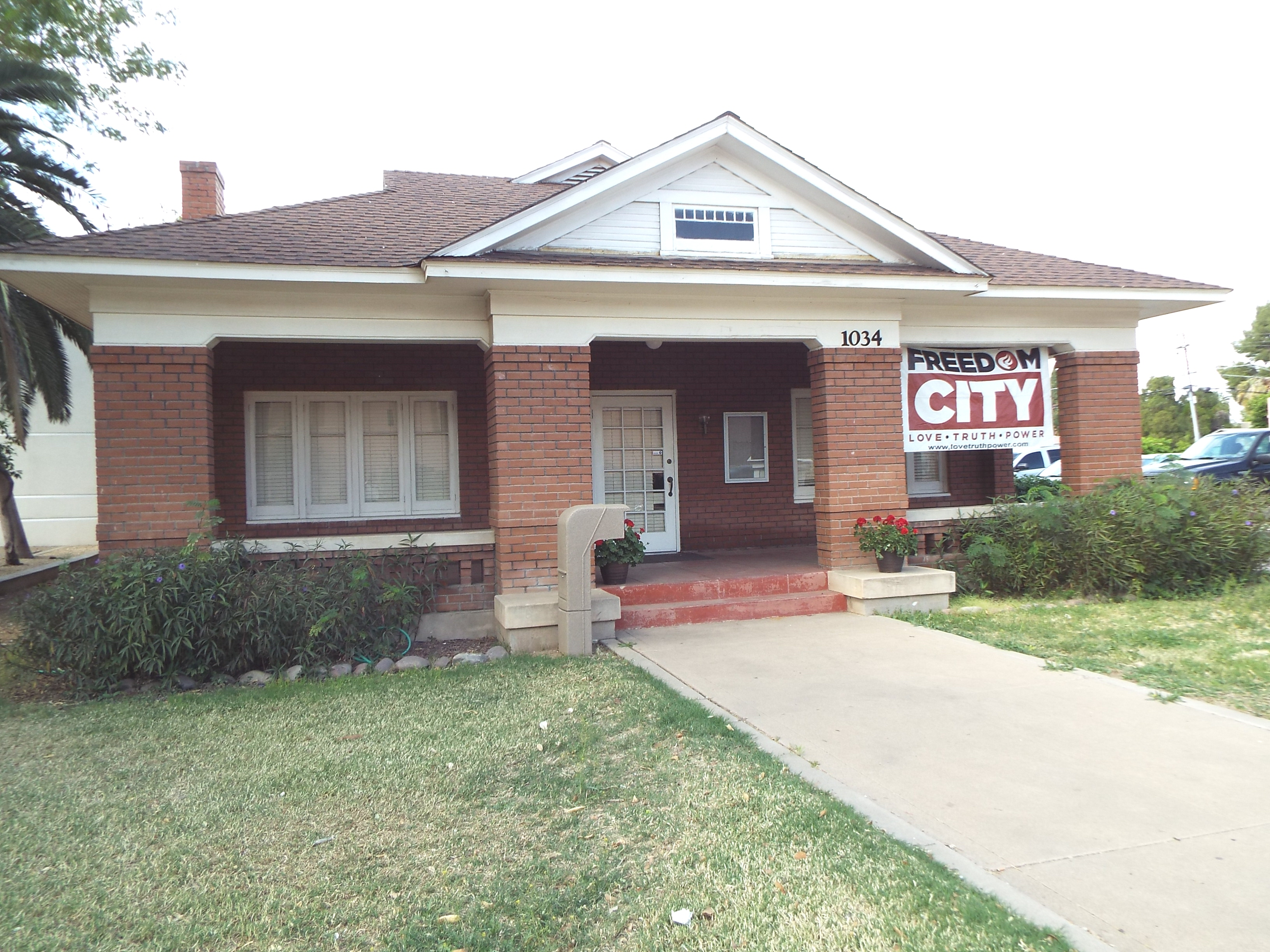
The Minson House .

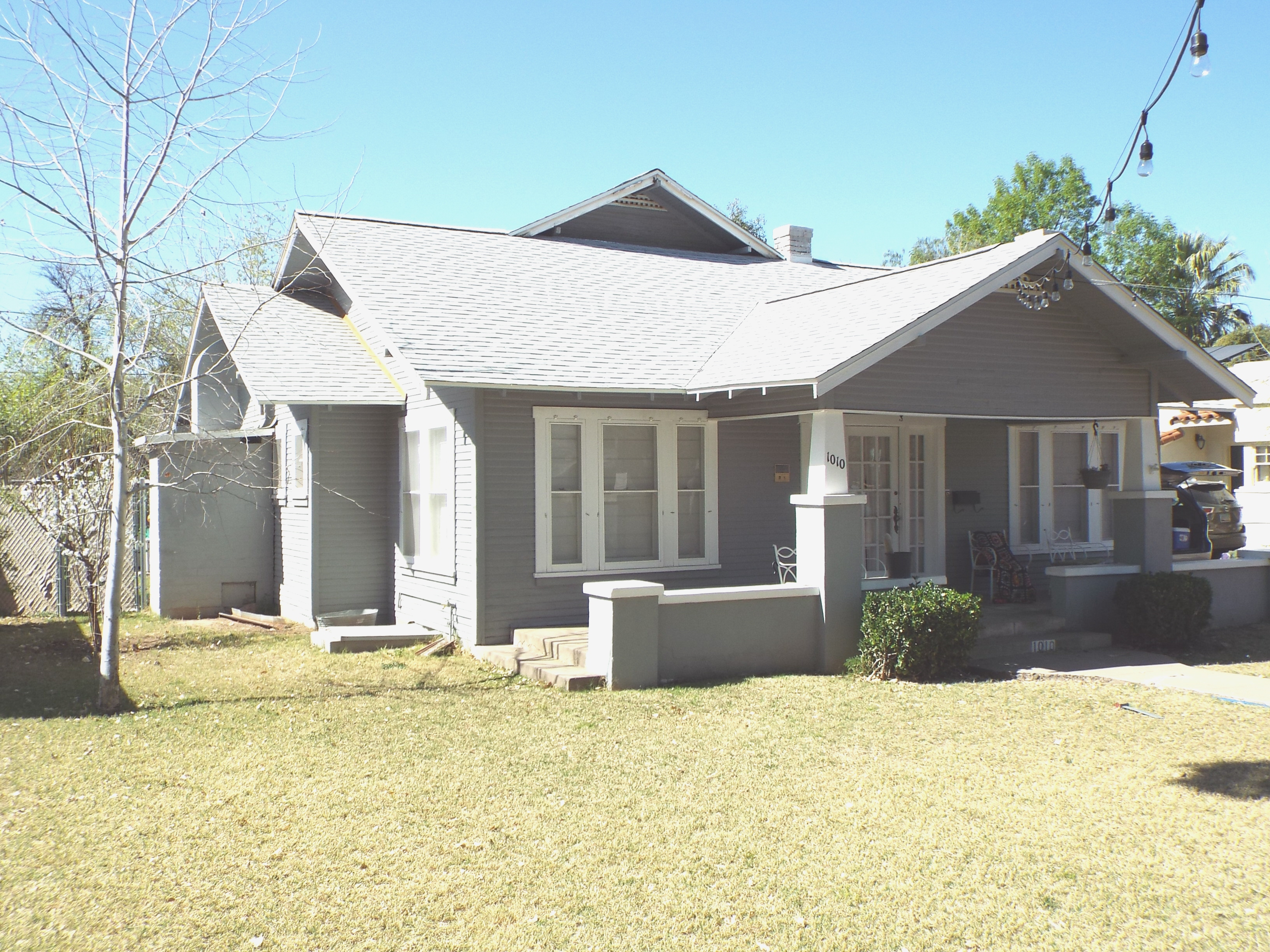
The Elliot House .

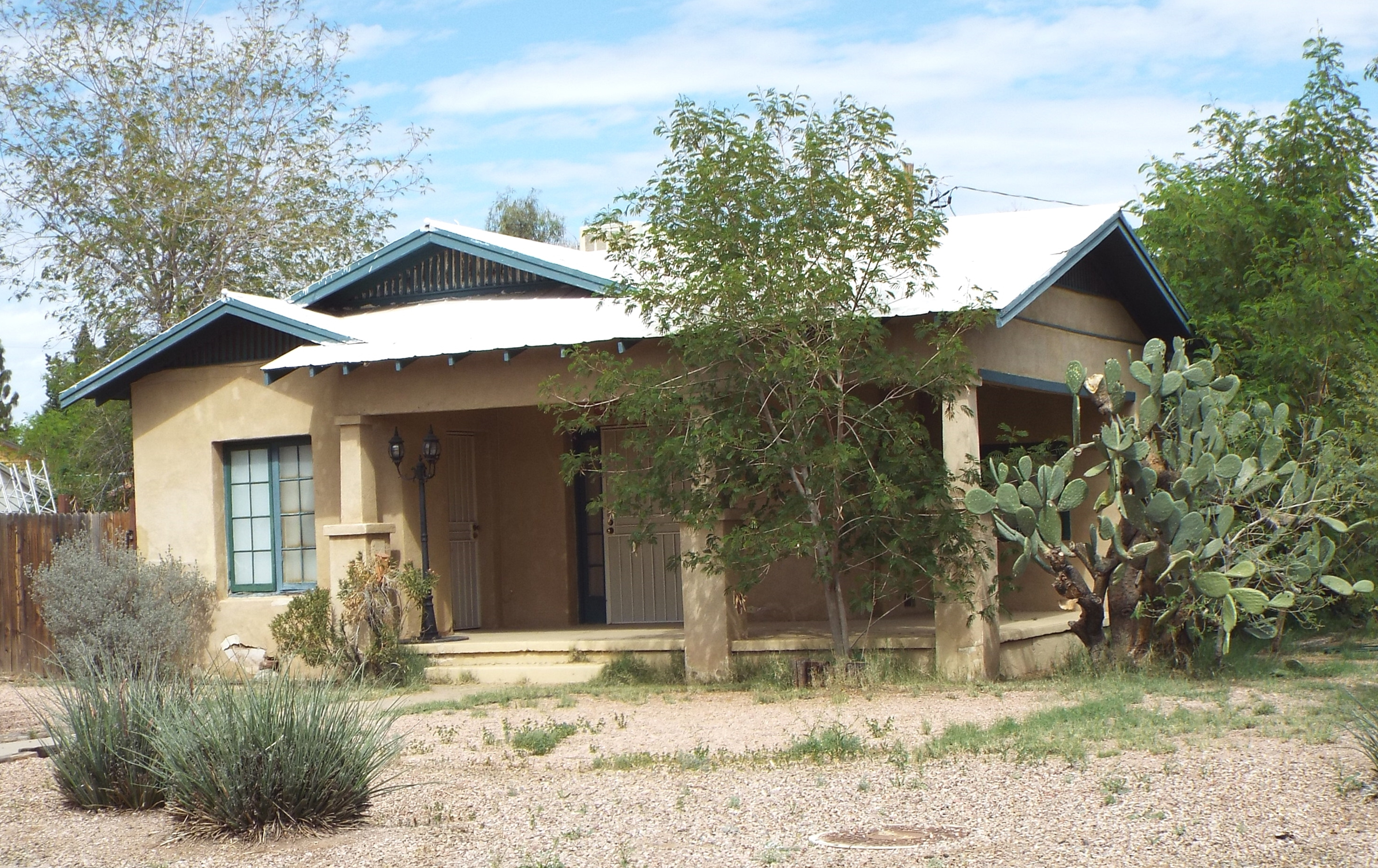
The Guthrie House .

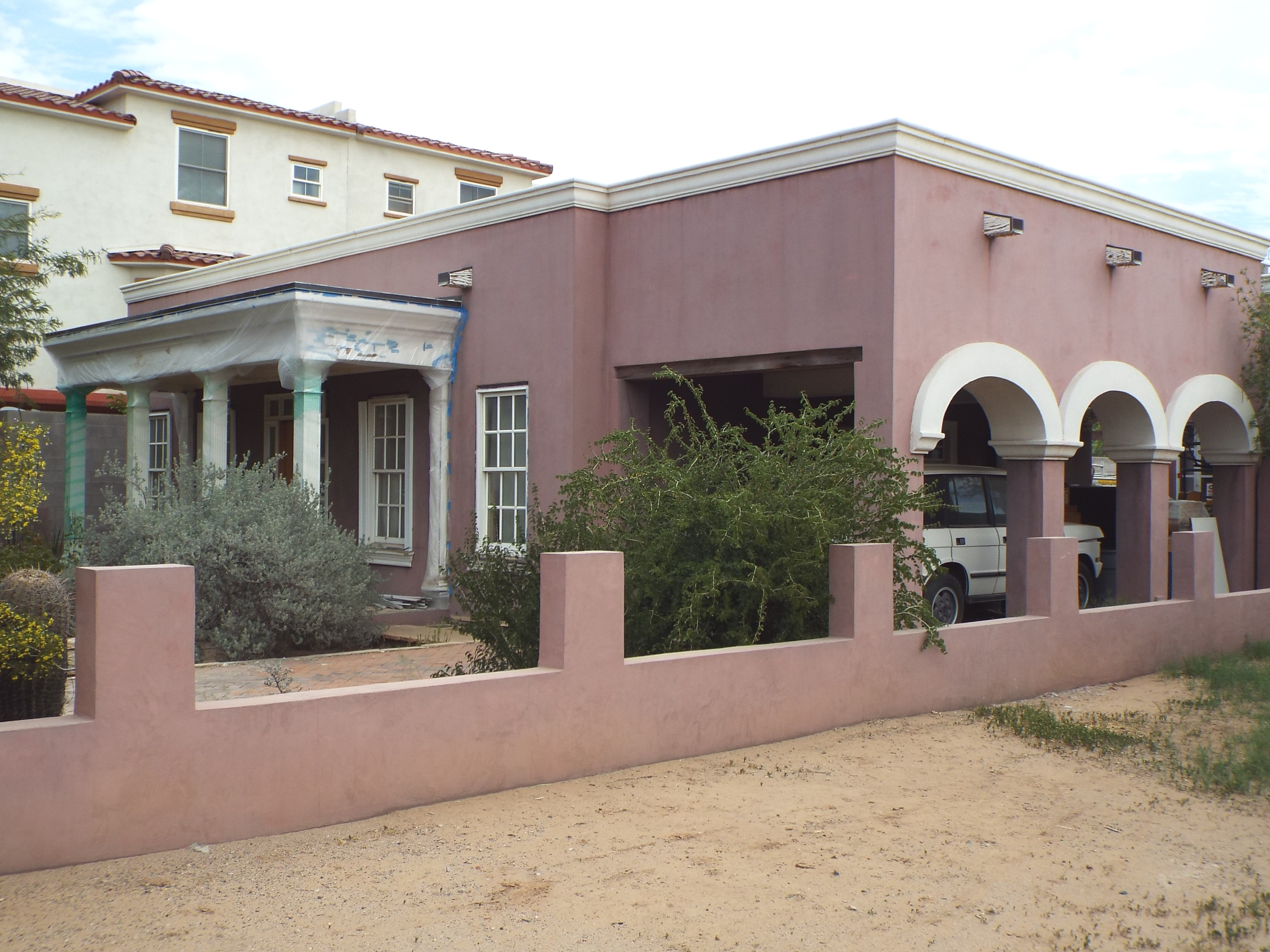
The Blakely House .

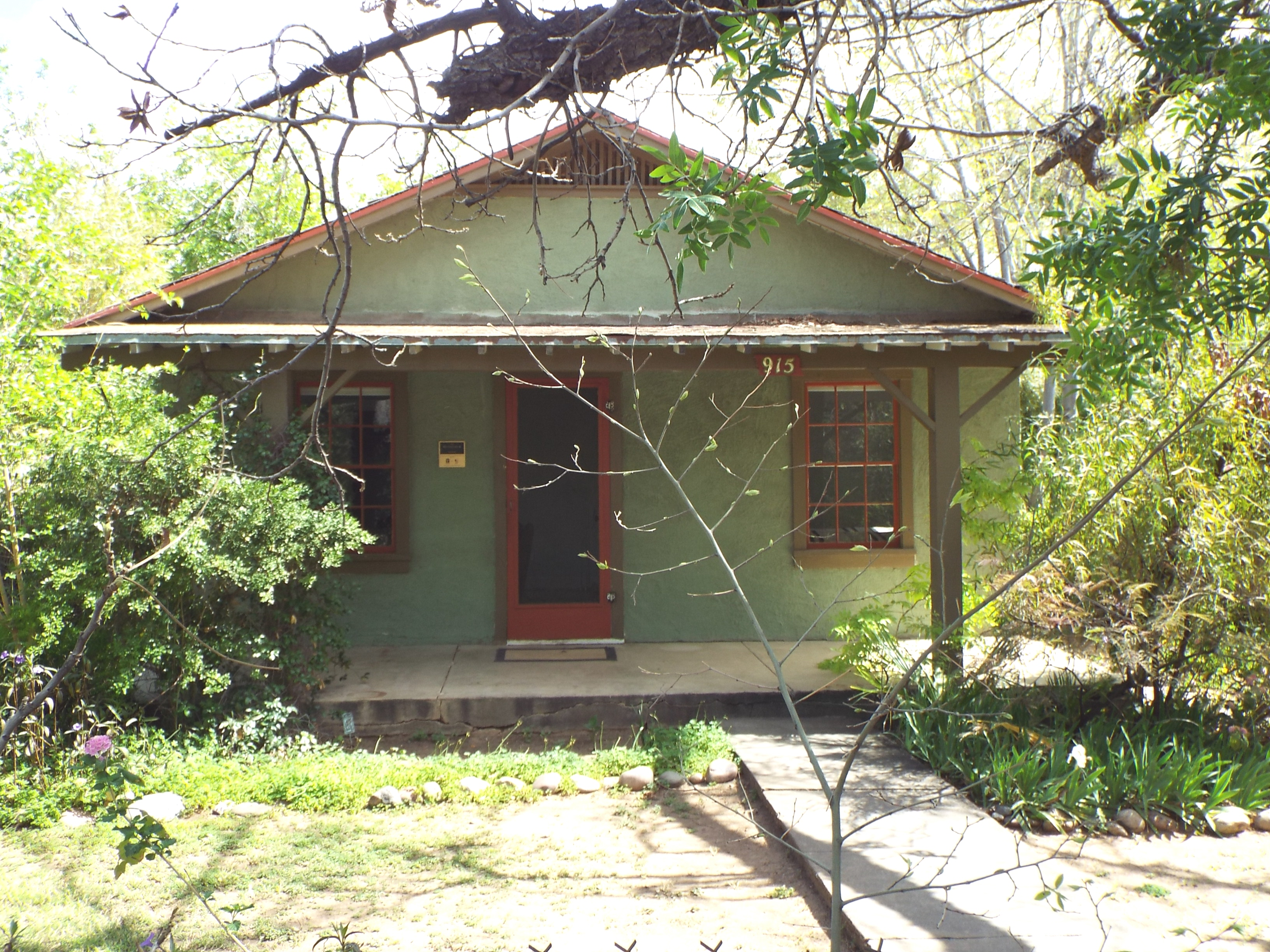
The McGinnes House .

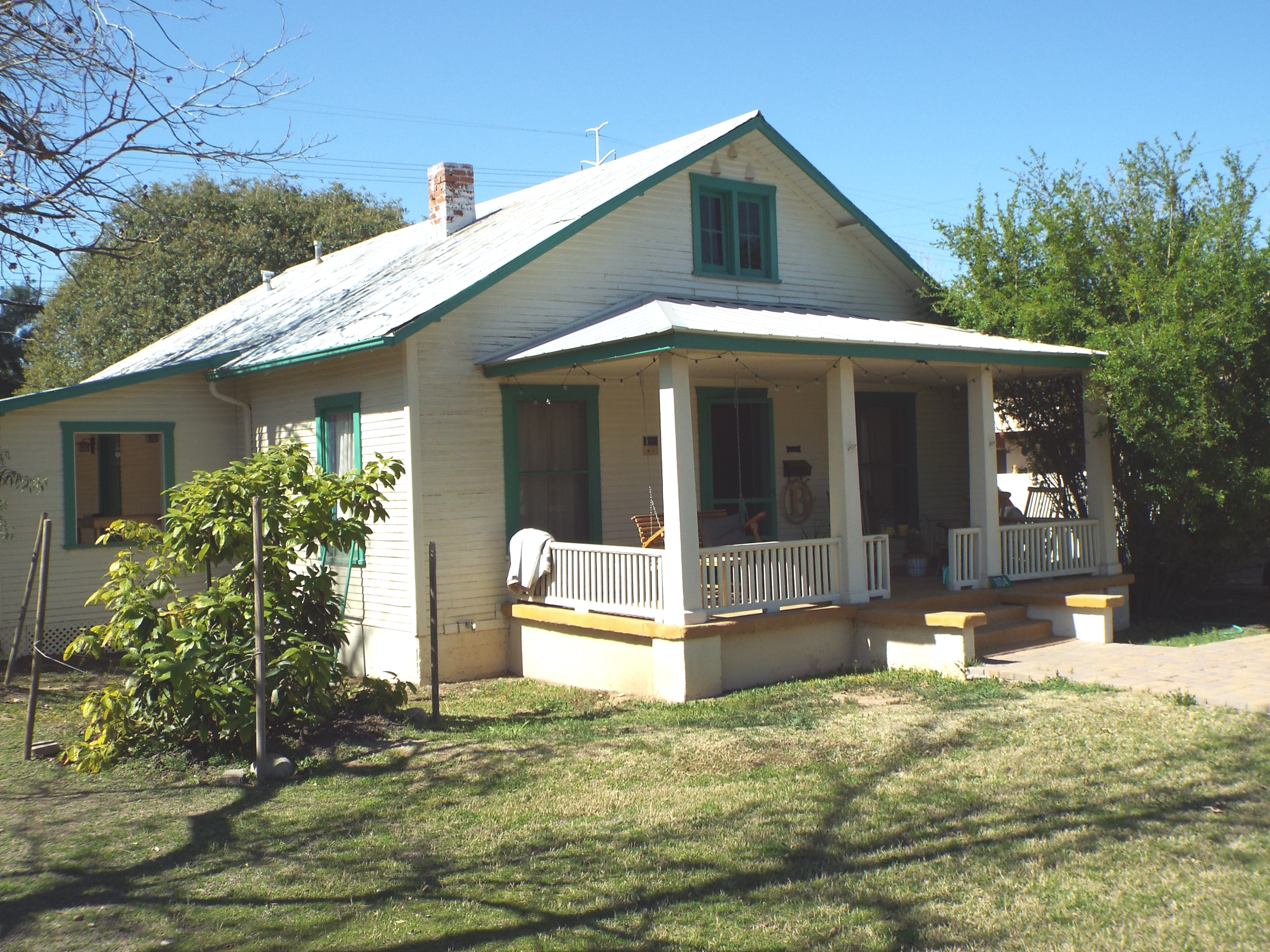
The Hiatt House .

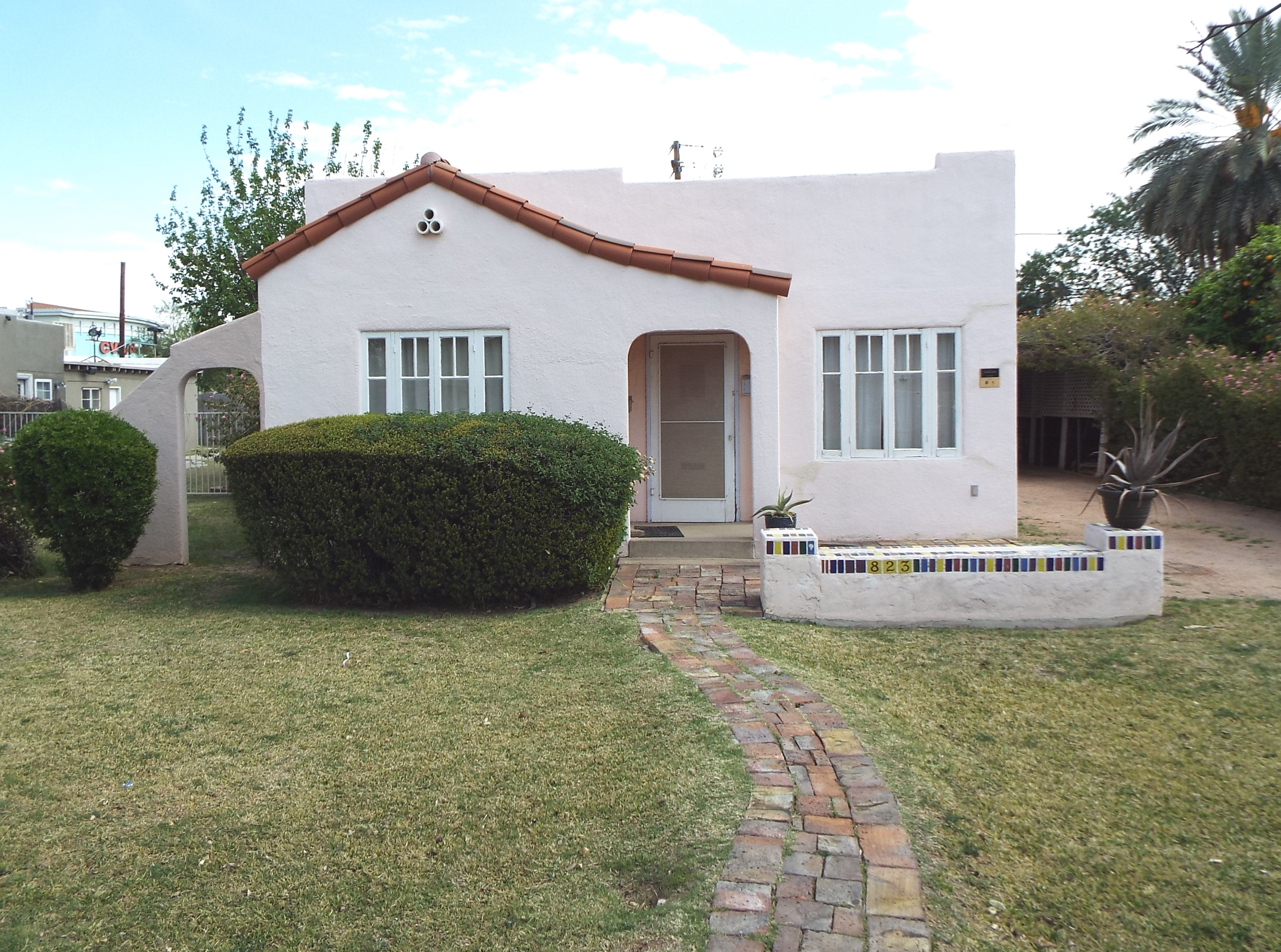
The Harris House .

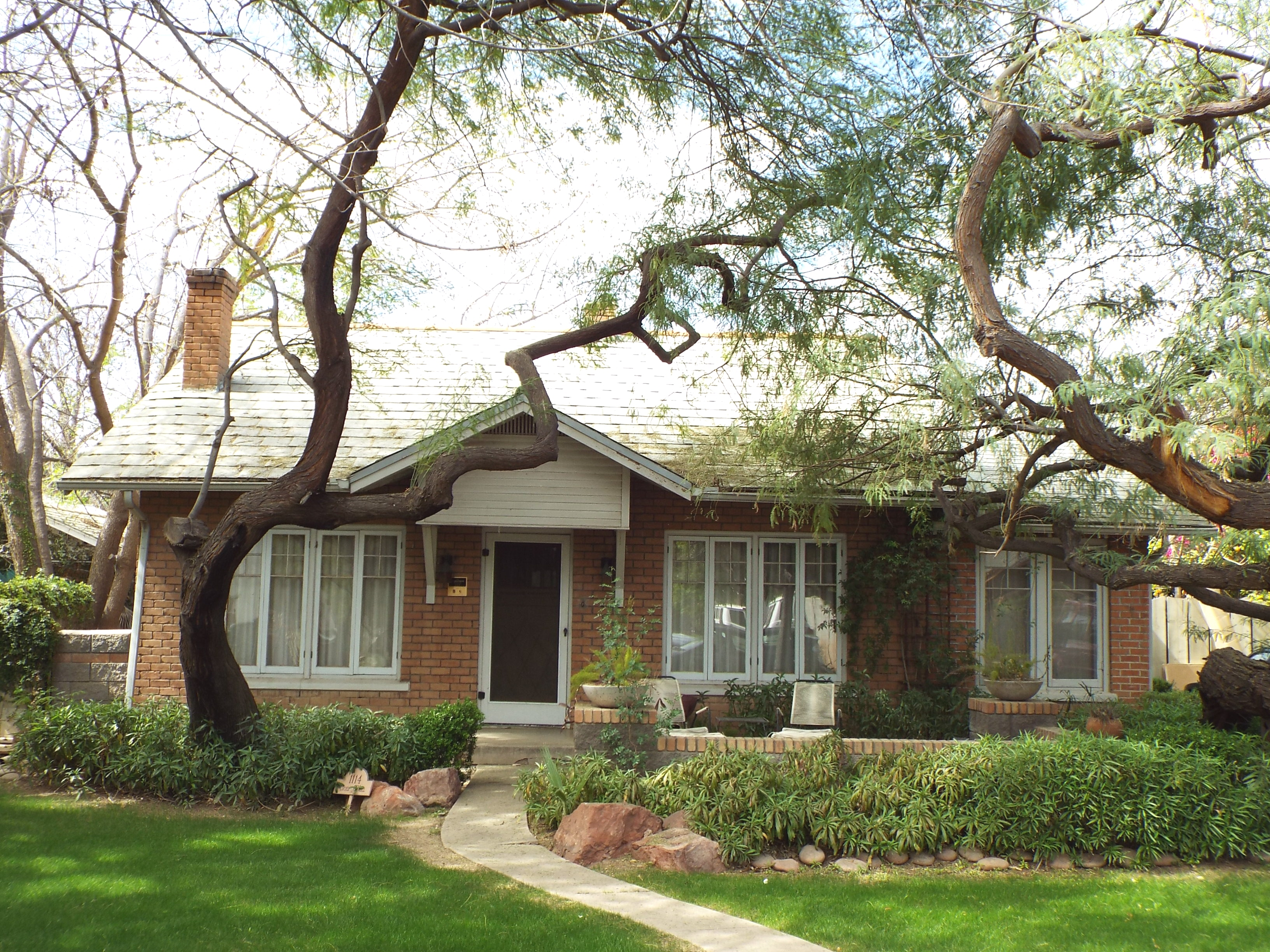
The Lucier/O’Neill House .

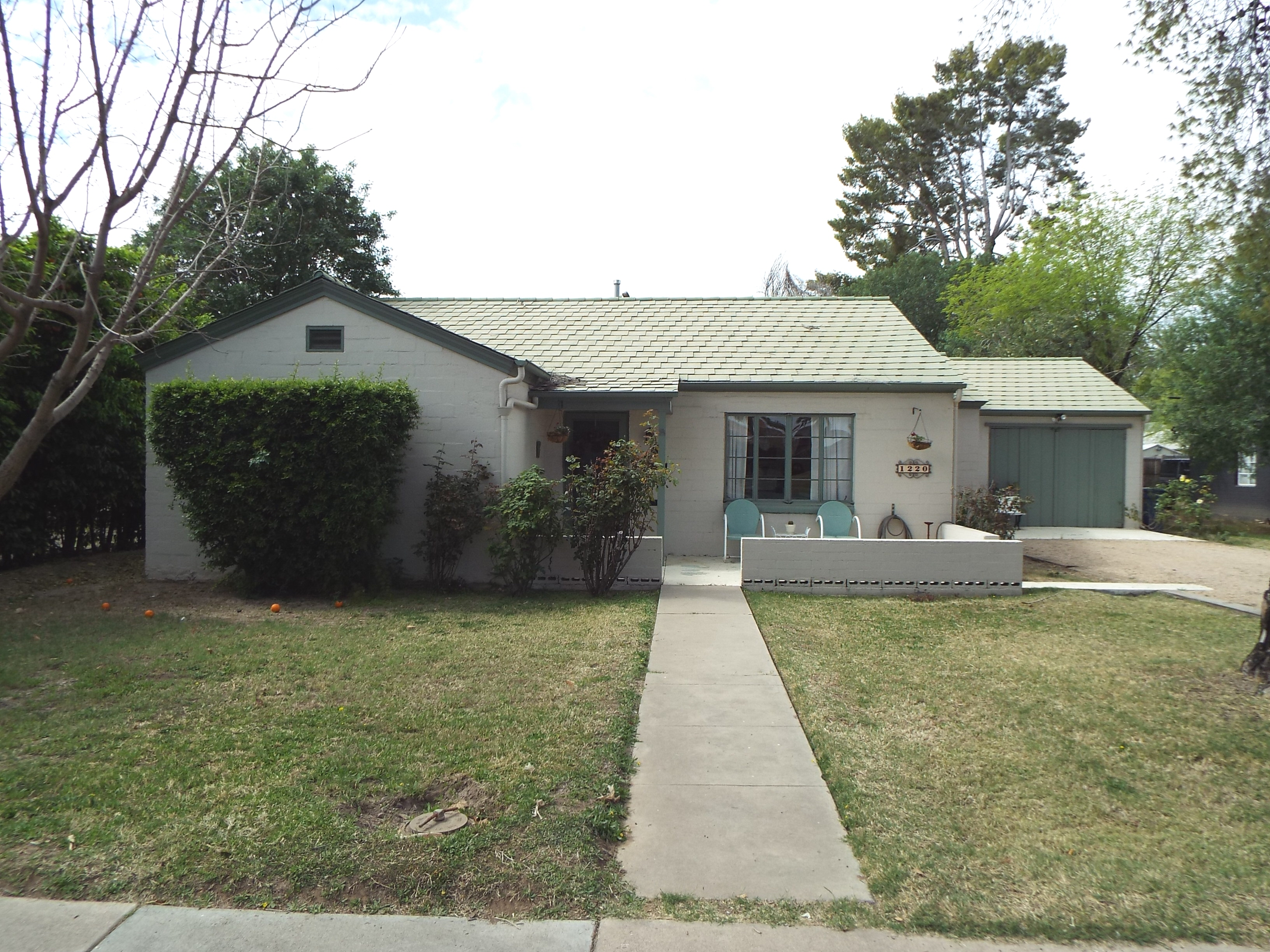
The Butler (Gray) House .

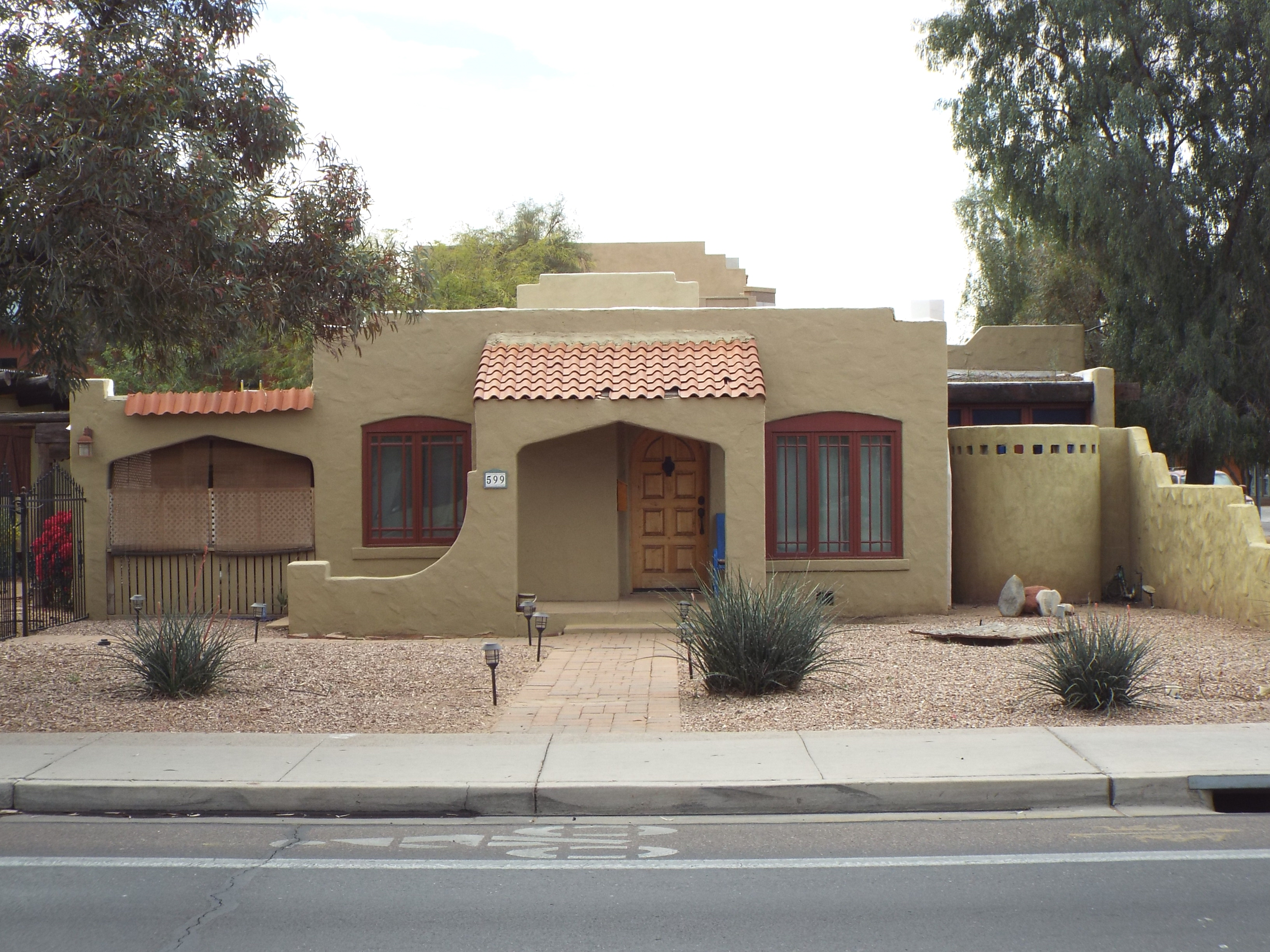
The Bauer House .

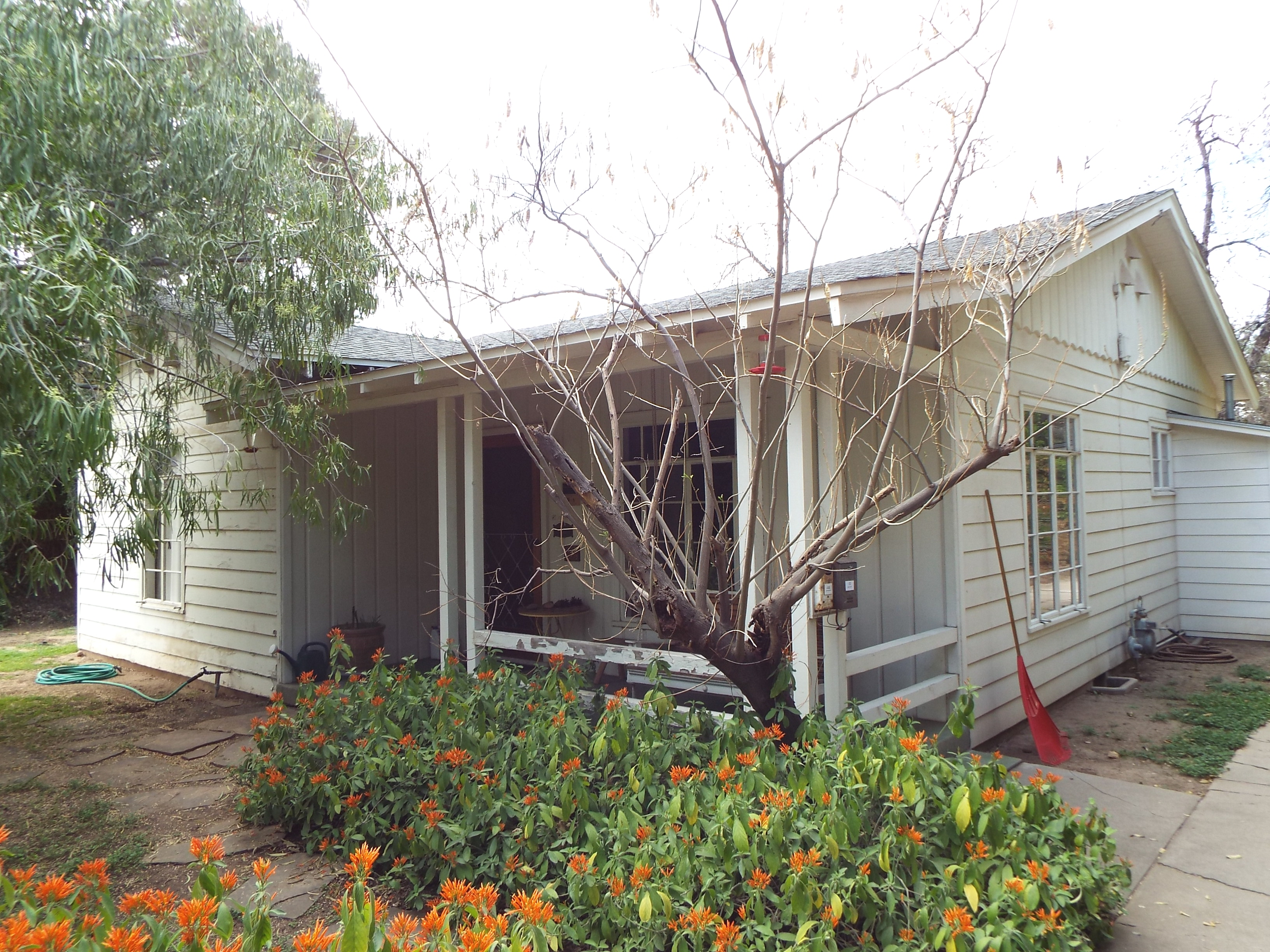
The Douglas-Gitlis House .

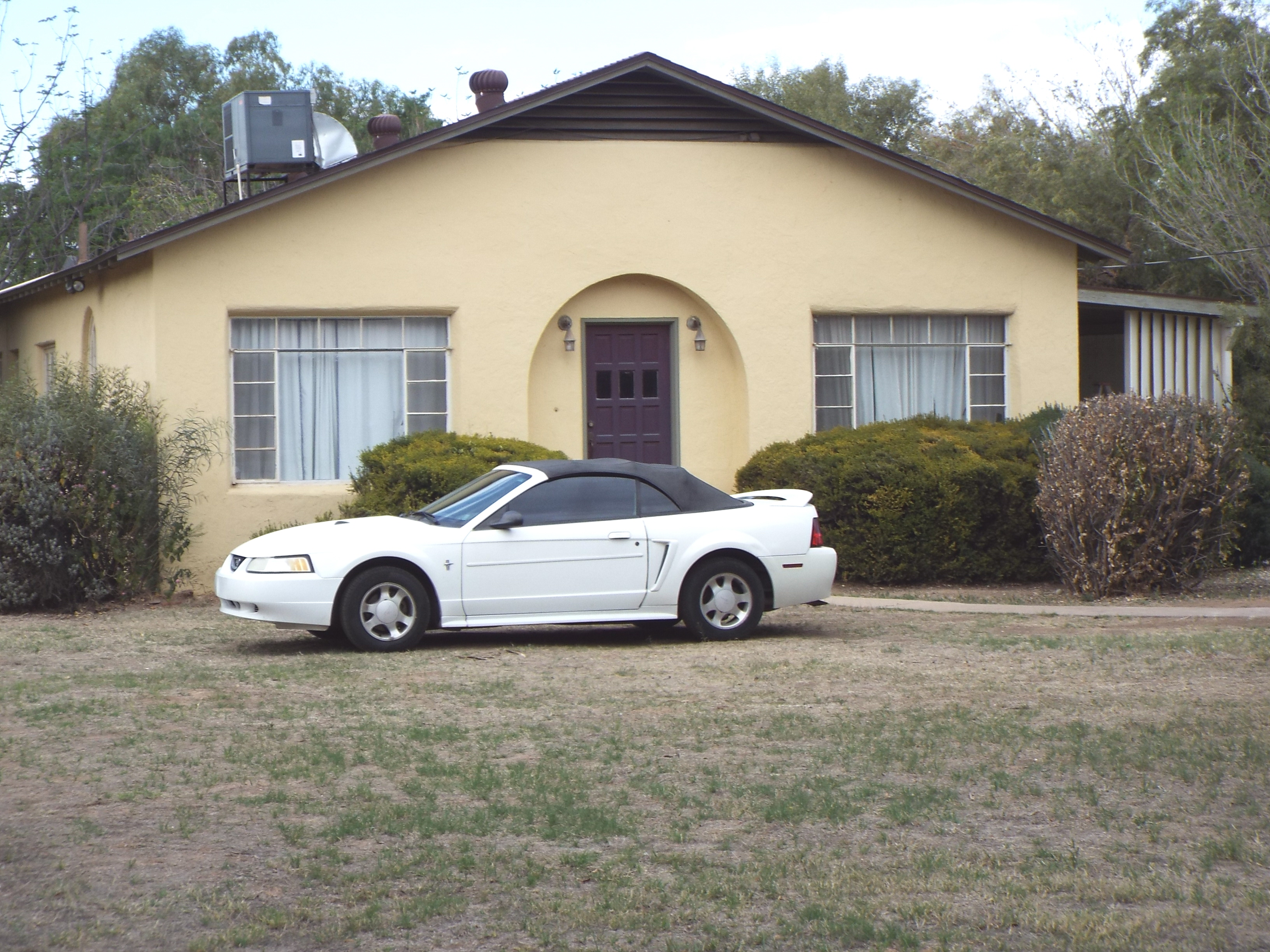
The Marriot House .

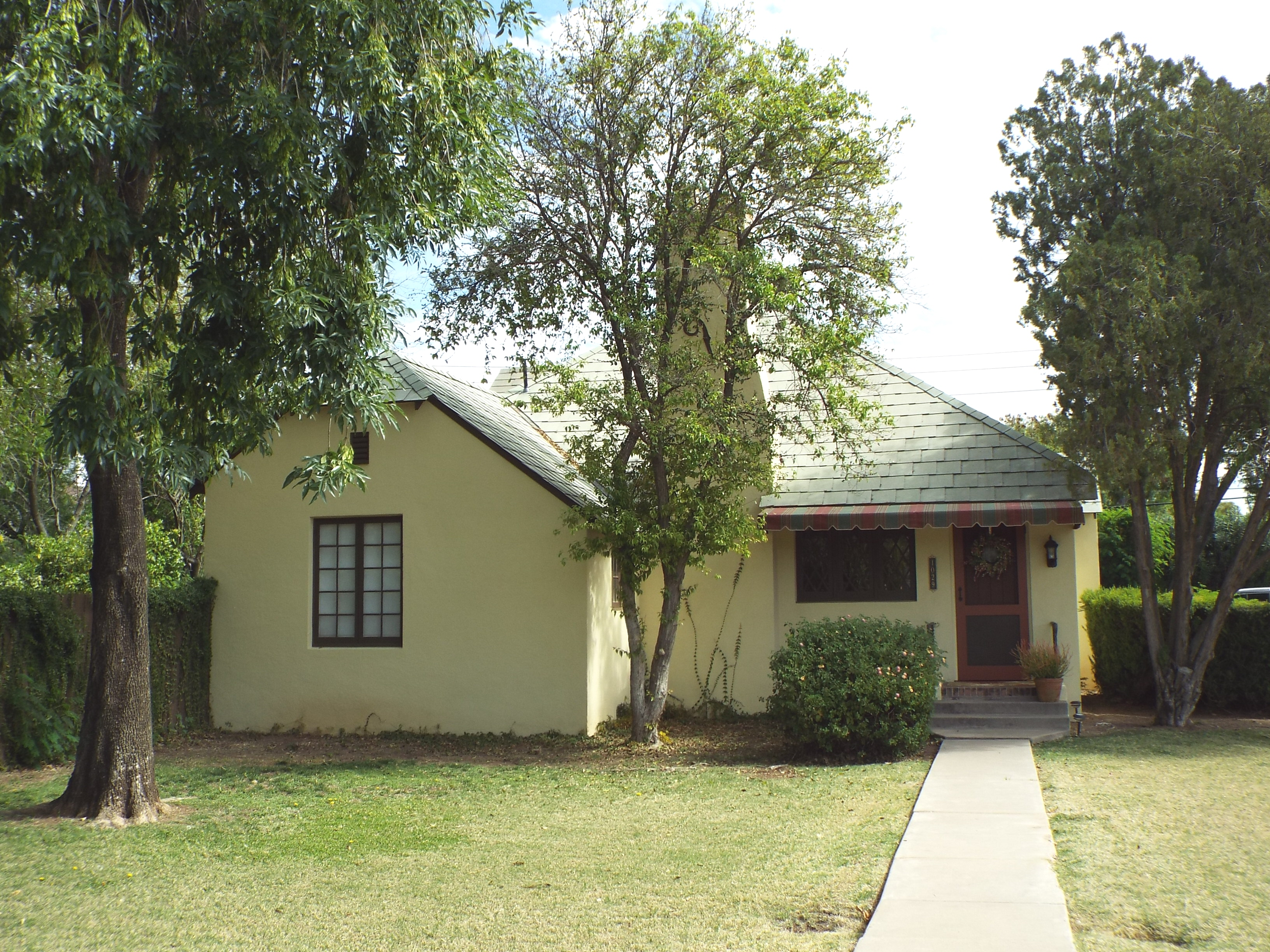
The Baker House .

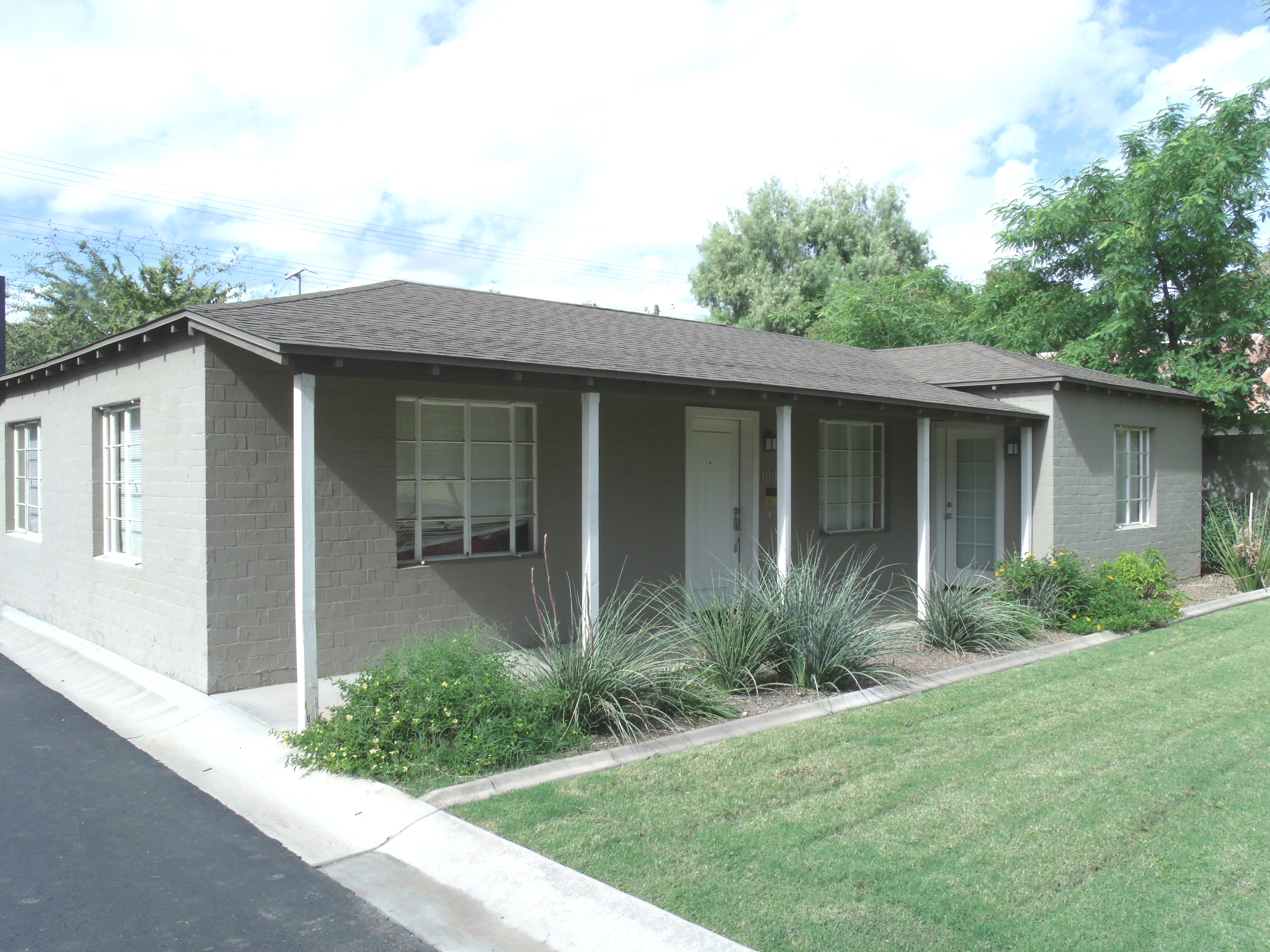
The Governor John Howard Pyle House.

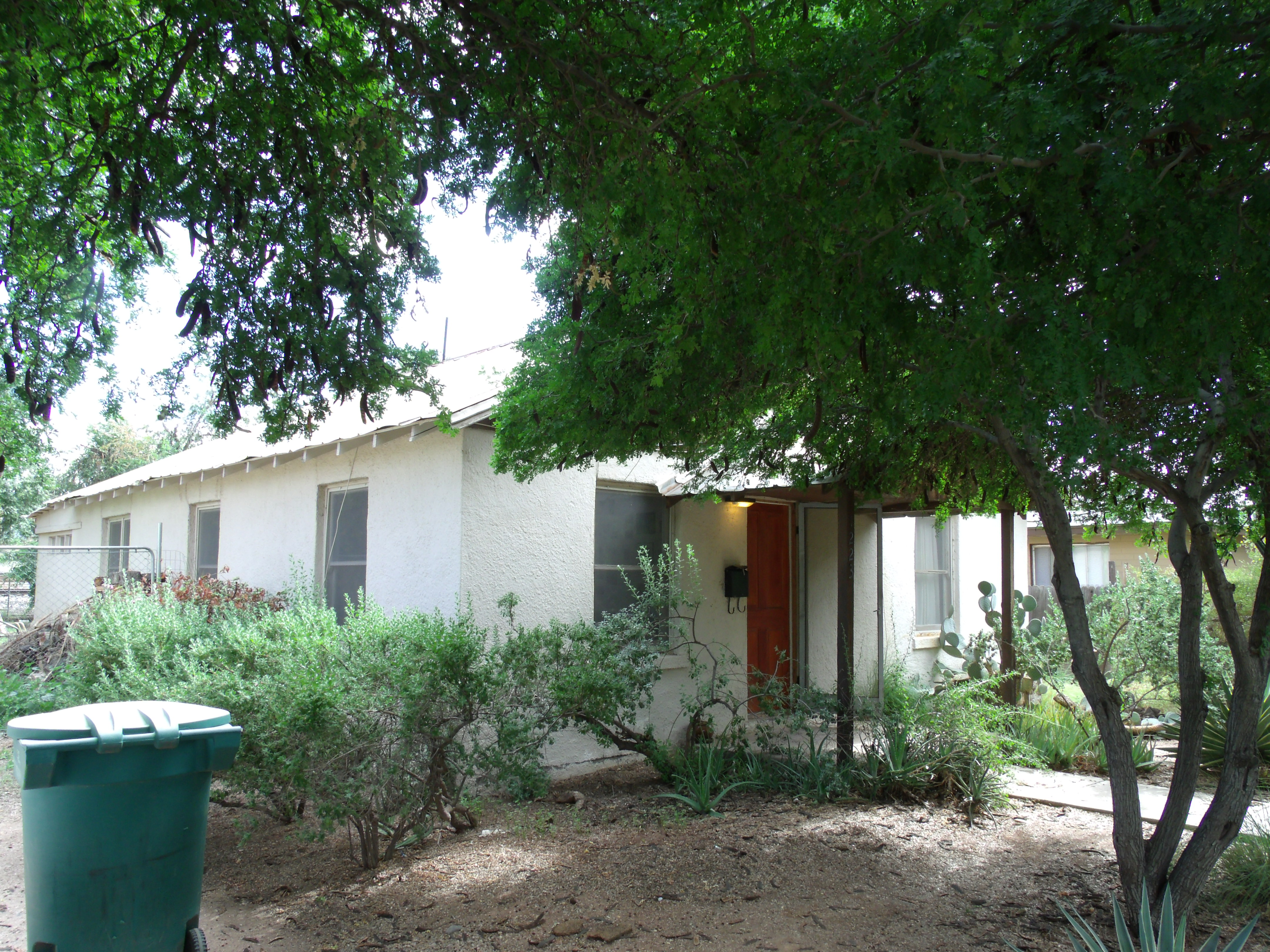
The Diefenderfer House .

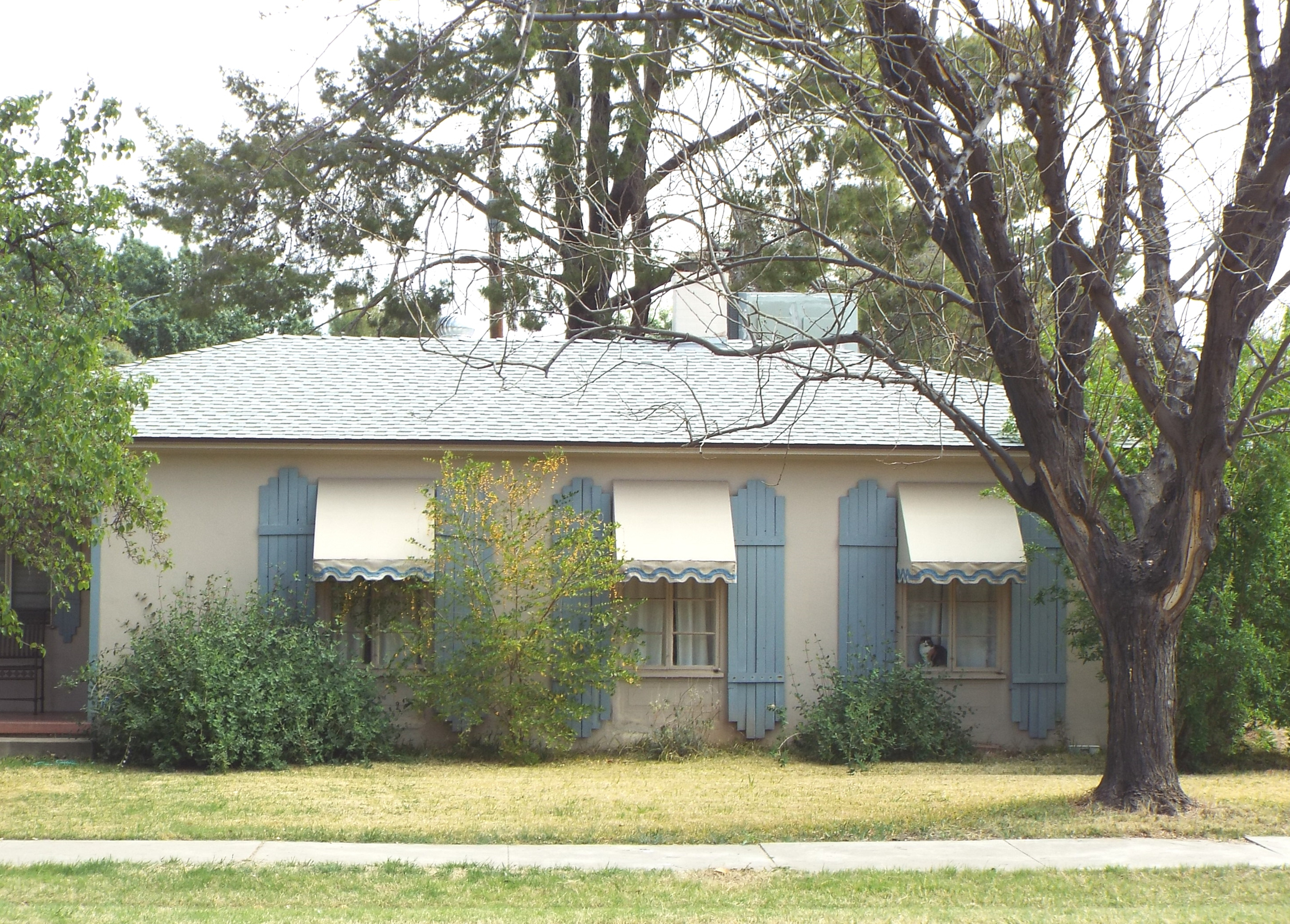
The Wexler House .

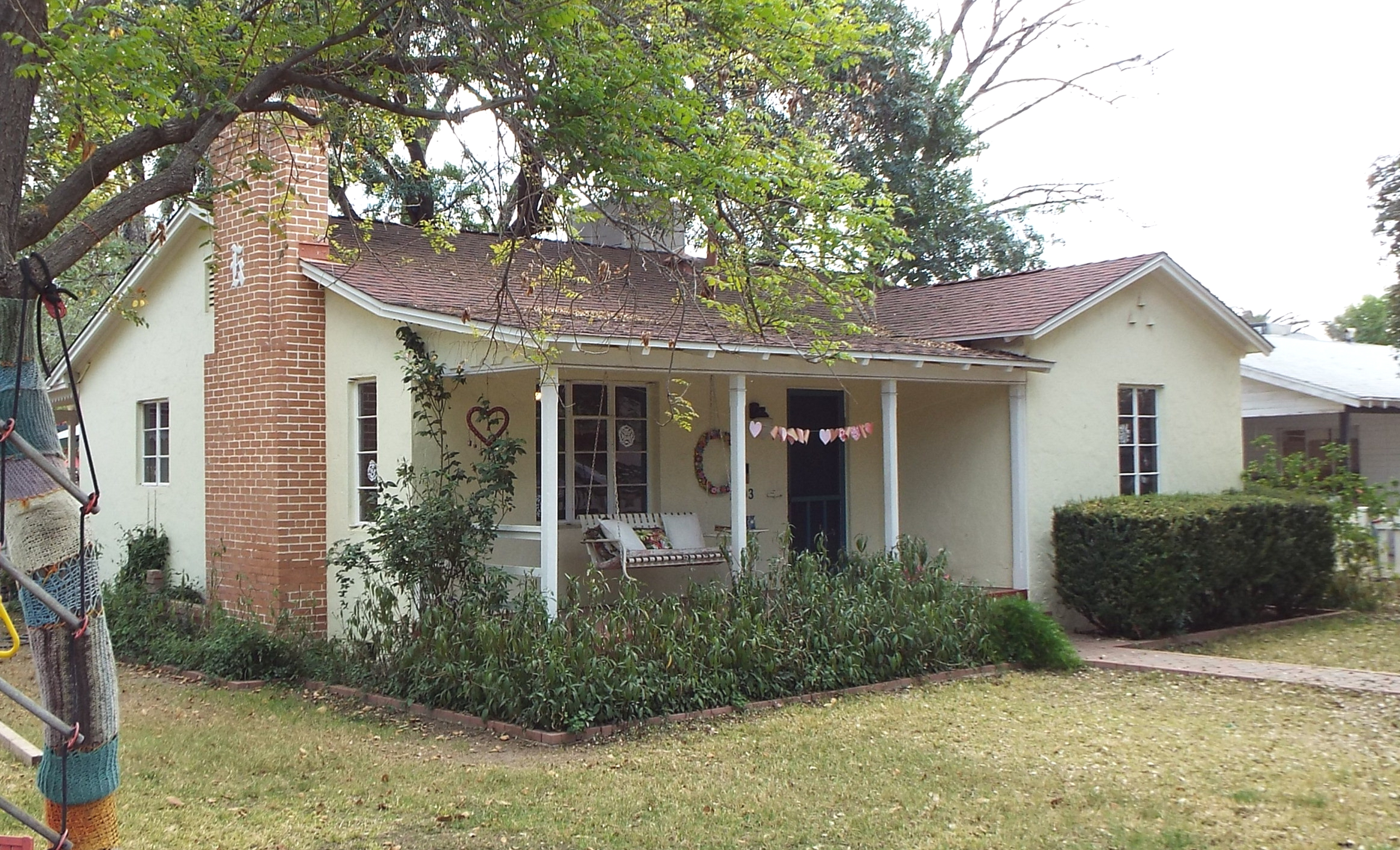
The Barnes House.

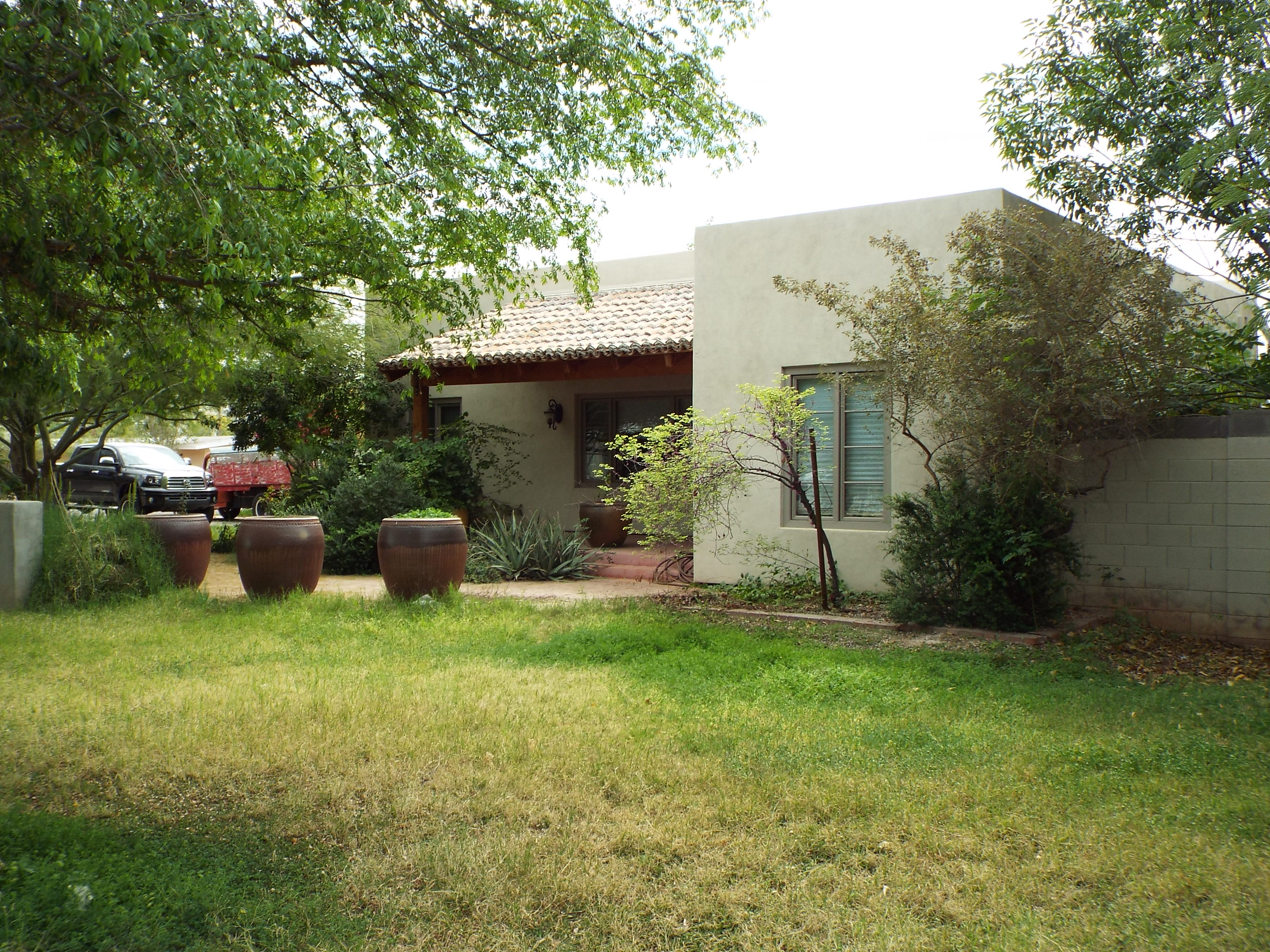
The Burket House .

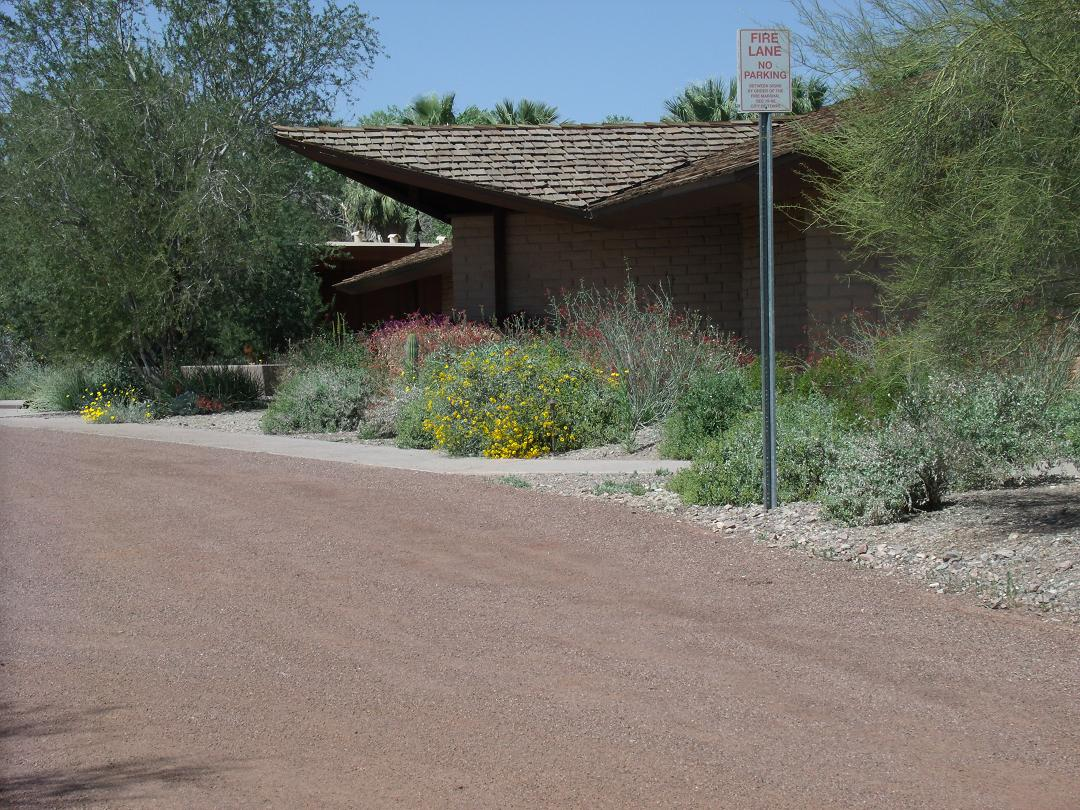
The Sandra Day O'Connor's House.

== Olde Towne Square ==
The following is a brief history of each of the houses in "Olde Towne Square".

- The Josephine Frankenberg House – built in 1910 and was originally located at 129 E. University Dr. The house was listed in the National Register of Historic Places on January 29, 1981, reference #81000138. The house was purchased by Josephine Frankenberg in 1919. Josephine nursed many victims back to health during the Great Influenza epidemic in 1918. She rented rooms on the second floor to boarders, mostly single teachers employed at the Normal School. The house remained in her possession until her death in 1949. It was dismantled and rebuilt at 150 S. Ash Ave in 1992 in Tempe's Olde Towne Square. Now lacking integrity of location, this property remains eligible for listing in the National Register of Historic Places under National Park Service Criterion B and C. The house is also listed as "Historic" in the Tempe Historic Property Survey.
- The Samuel C. Long House – built in 1910 and was originally located at 27 E. 6th St. The house was listed in the National Register of Historic Places on November 28, 1980, reference #80000765. It was dismantled and rebuilt at 150 S. Ash Ave in 1992 in Tempe's Olde Towne Square. Now lacking integrity of location, this property remains eligible for listing in the National Register of Historic Places under National Park Service Criterion B and C. The house is also listed as "Historic" in the Tempe Historic Property Survey.
- The Woolf-Cole House – built in 1910 as a residence and originally located at 9th and Myrtle Aves.. It was dismantled from its original location and rebuilt at 150 S. Ash Ave in 1992 in Tempe's Olde Towne Square. The house is listed as "Historic" in the Tempe Historic Property Survey.
- The Wolf-Sachs-Mrs. G.A. Goodwin House (Charlotte Josephine Mullen Goodwin) – built in 1896. It was dismantled from its original location and rebuilt at 150 S. Ash Ave in 1992 in Tempe's Olde Towne Square. The house is listed as "Historic" in the Tempe Historic Property Survey.
- The Newton/Warner House (Methodist Parsonage) – built in 1910 and was originally located at 718 S. Maple St. It was dismantled and rebuilt at 150 S. Ash Ave in 1992 in Tempe's Olde Towne Square. The house is listed as "Historic" in the Tempe Historic Property Survey.
Historic Houses in "Olde Towne Square"
(NRHP = National Register of Historic Places)
(THPS = Tempe Historic Property Survey)
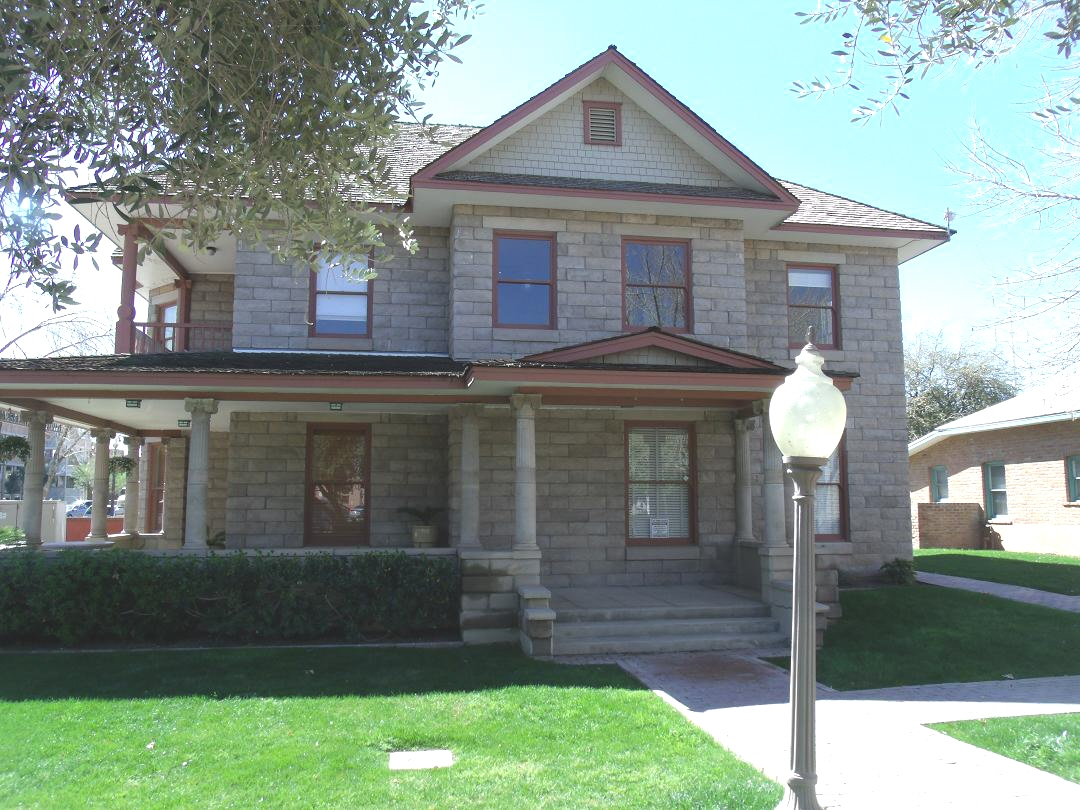
The Josephine Frankenberg House.

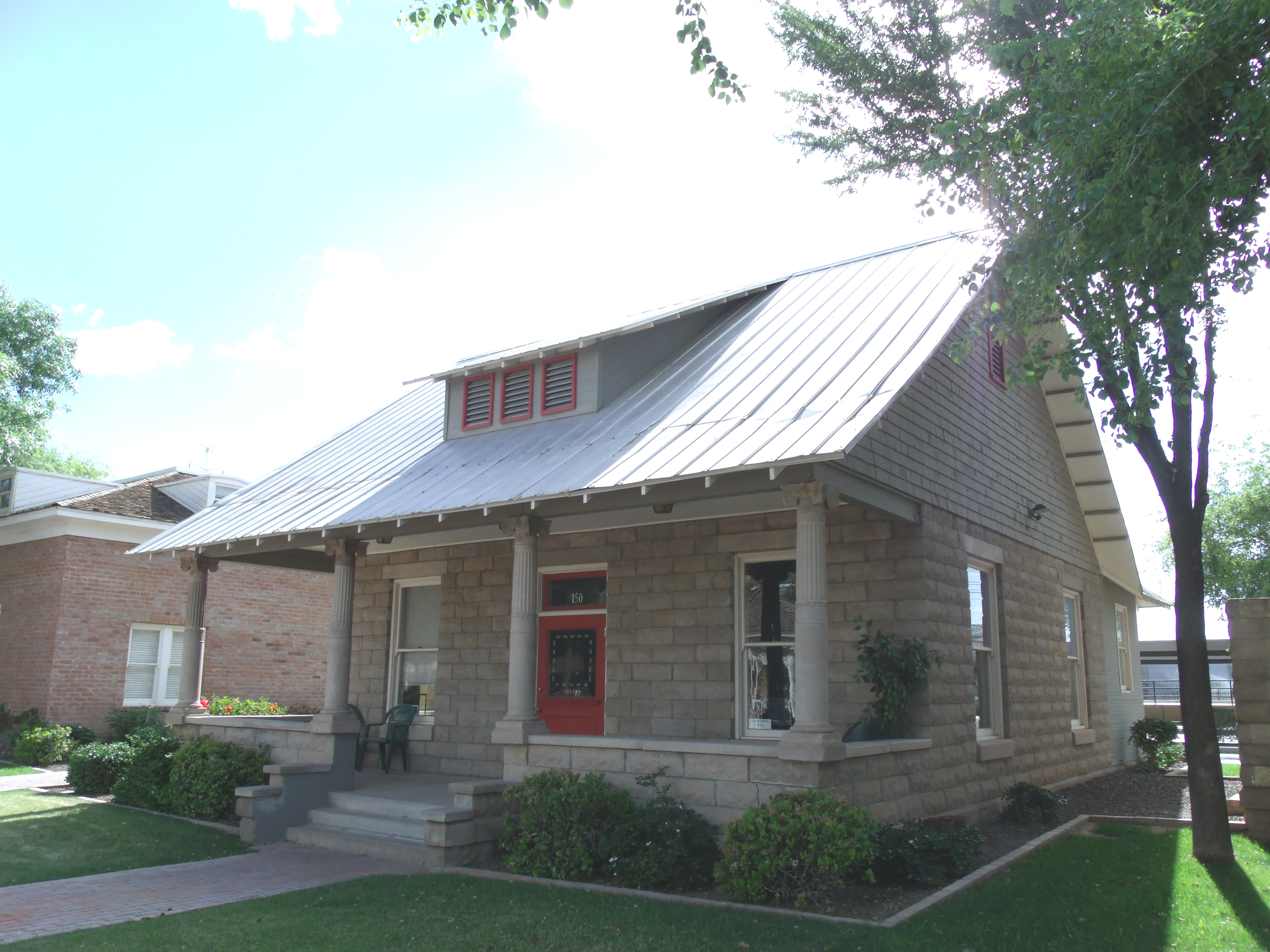
The Samuel C. Long House.

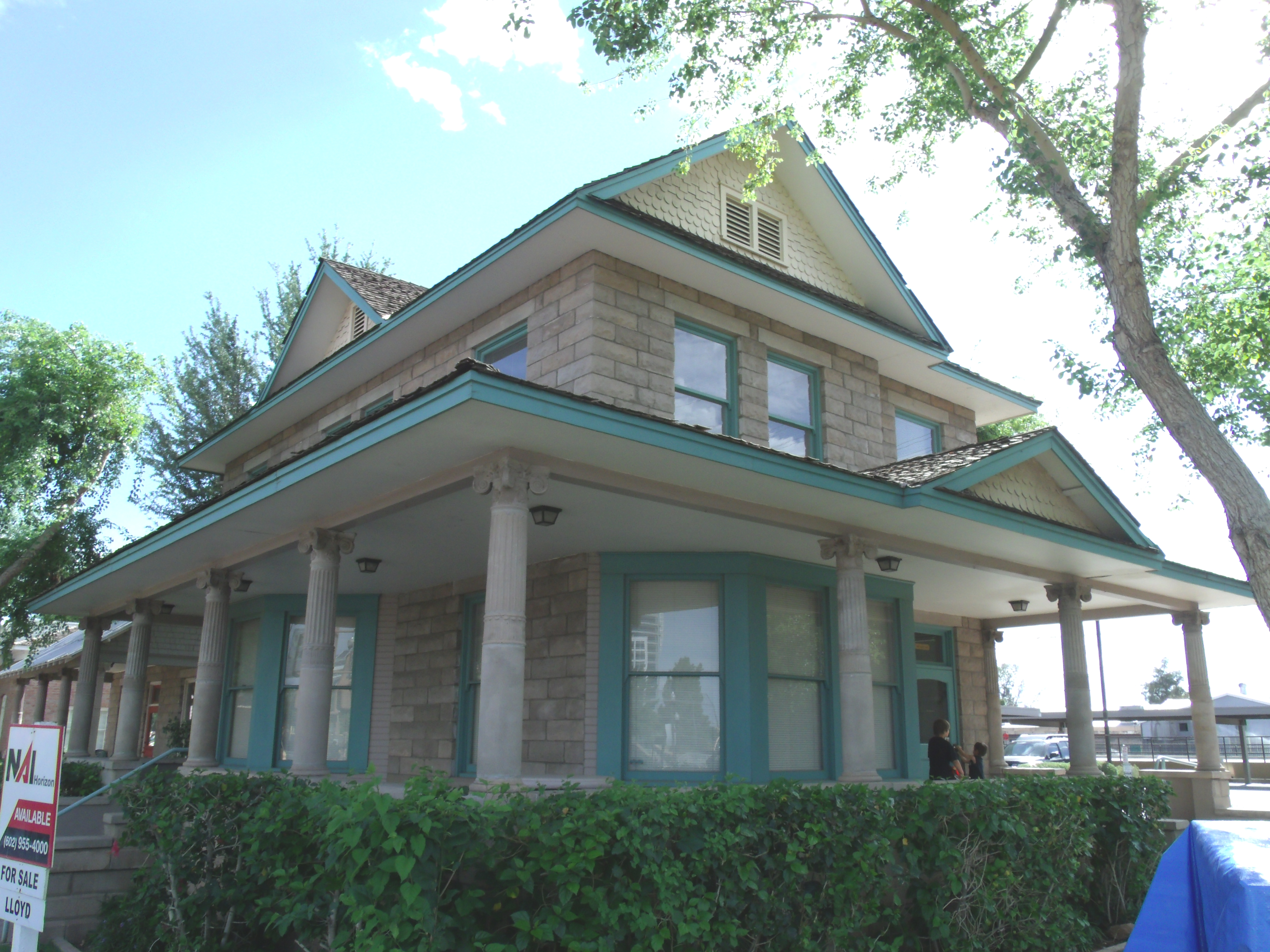
The Woolf-Cole House.

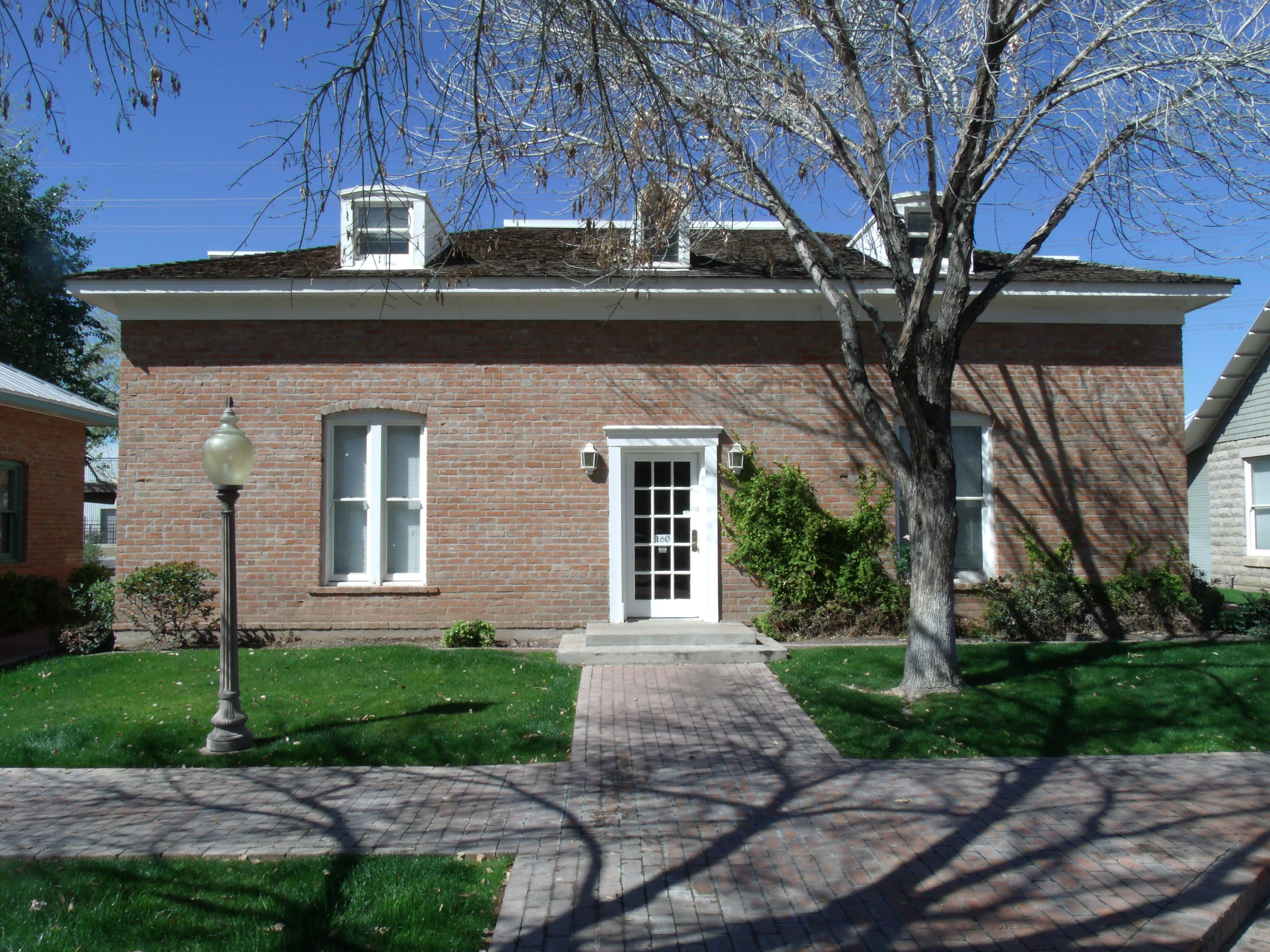
The Wolf-Sachs-Mrs. G.A. Goodwin House.

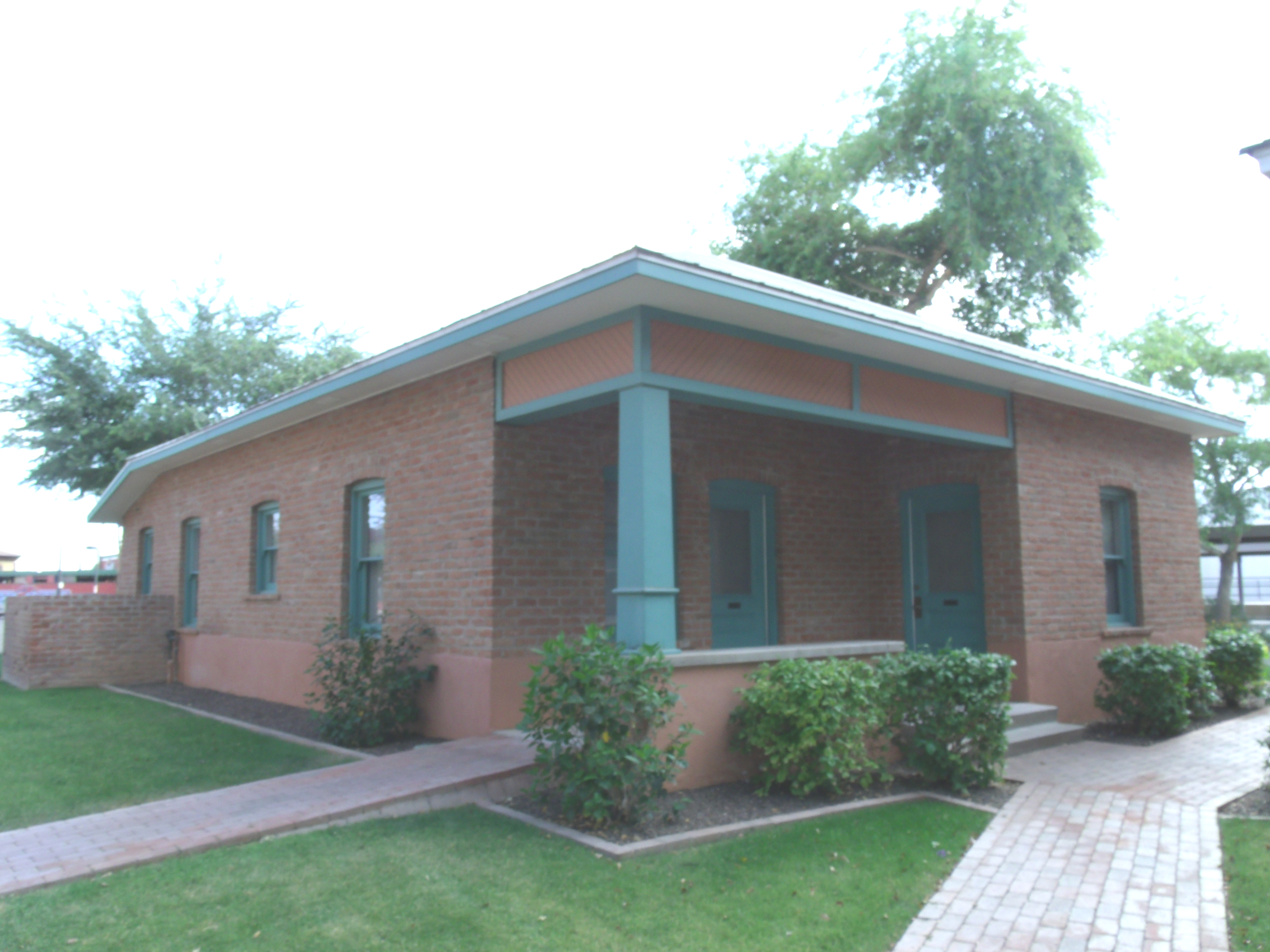
The Newton/Warner House (Methodist Parsonage).

== The Niels Petersen House ==
The Niels Petersen House was built in 1892 and is located at 1414 W. Southern Ave. in Tempe, Az. The house was built in 1892 by Niels Petersen, a Danish immigrant who came to Tempe in 1871. He developed a ranch with substantial land holdings, was president of the Farmers and Merchants Bank, co-founder of the Methodist Episcopal Church, and a representative at the 18th Territorial Legislature. Creighton, the architect, worked for many years in Arizona, and among his extant works are the Pinal County Courthouse, Old Main at the University of Arizona, and the Tempe Hardware Building on Mill Avenue in Tempe. It was listed in the National Register of Historic Places on January 5, 1978, reference #78000553.

The Historic Niels Petersen House
(NRHP = National Register of Historic Places)
(THPR = Tempe Historic Property Register)

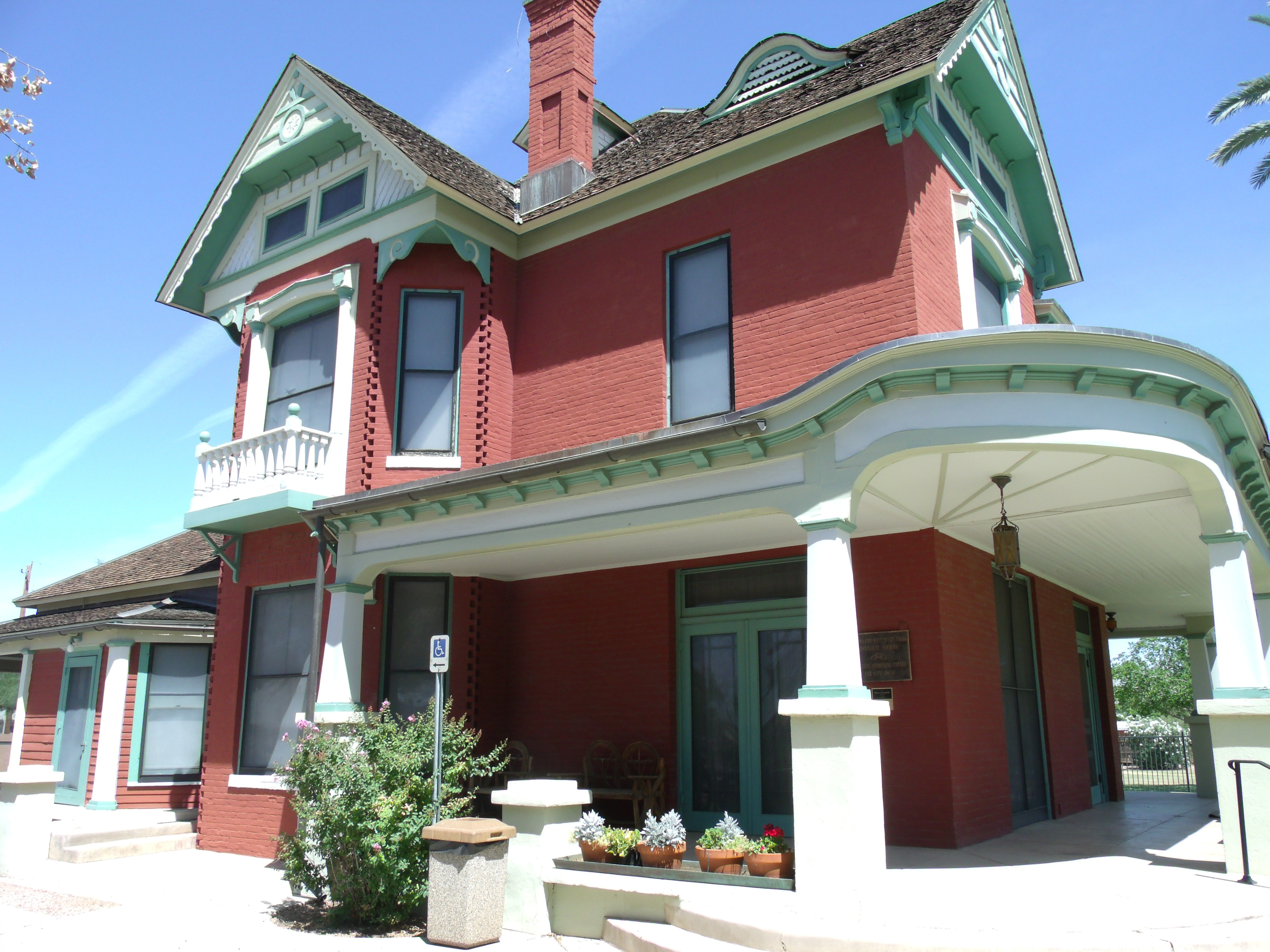
Niels Petersen House (1892) at 1414 W. Southern Ave.

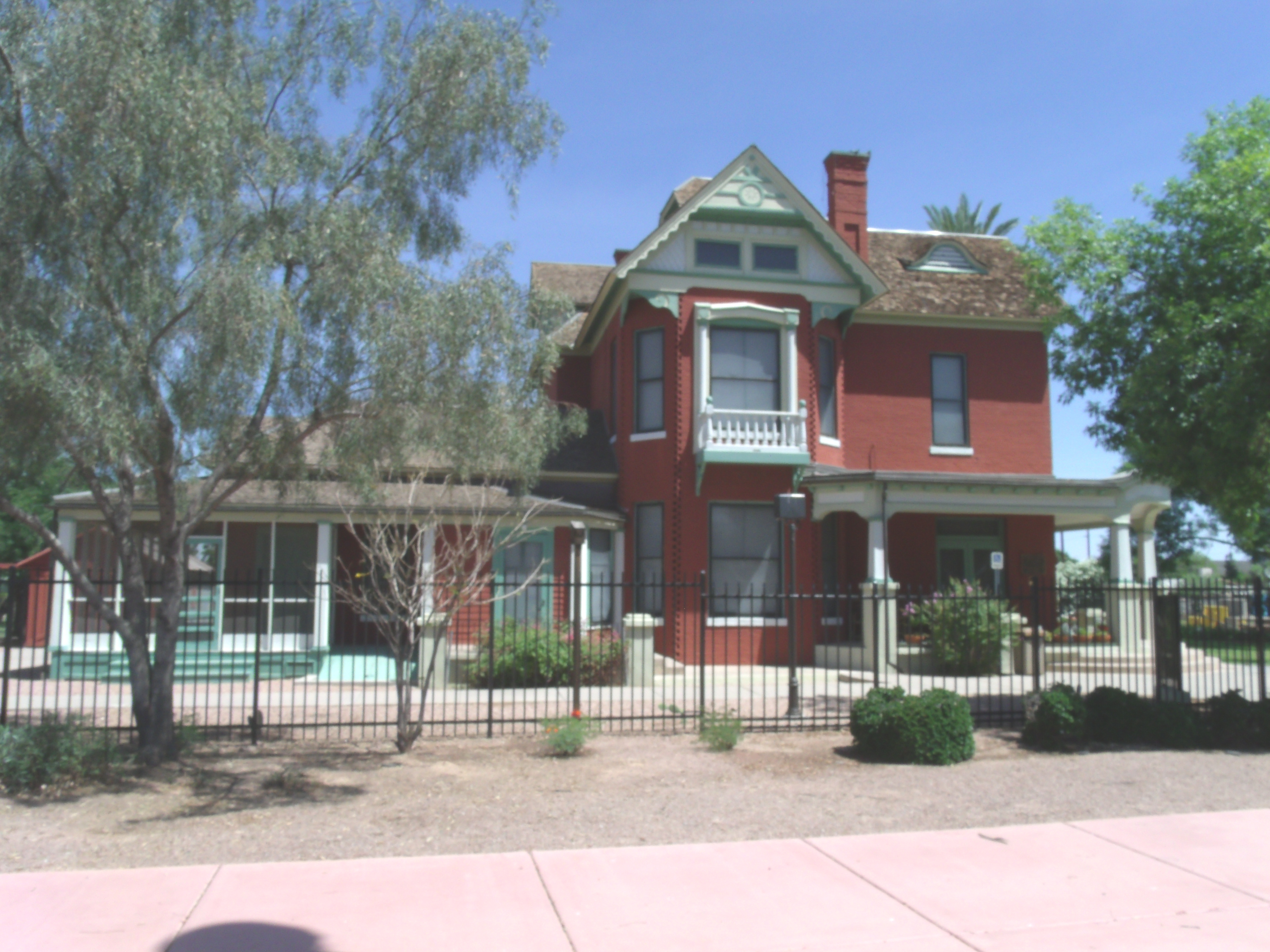
The Niels Petersen House.

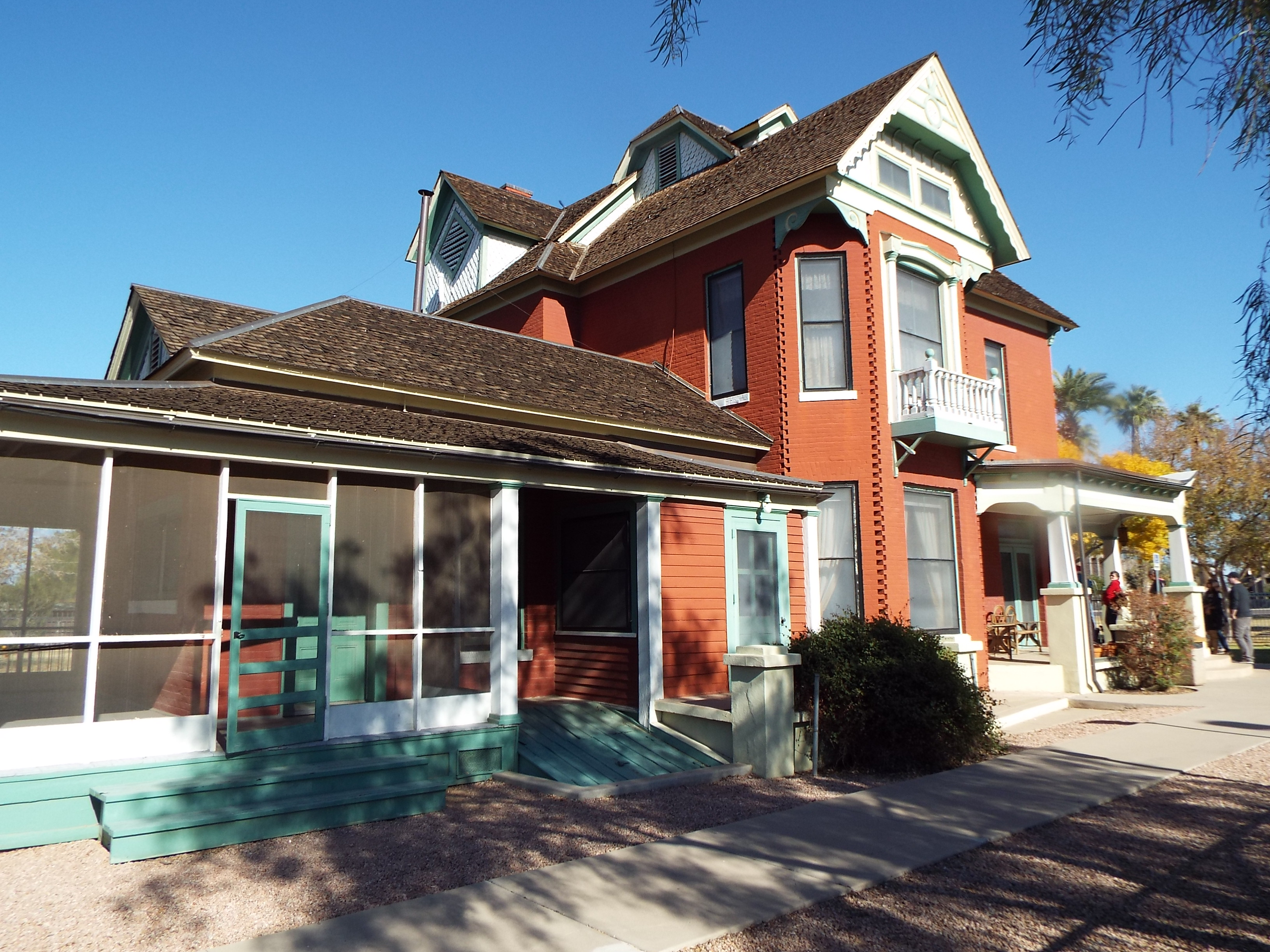
Different view of the Niels Petersen House.

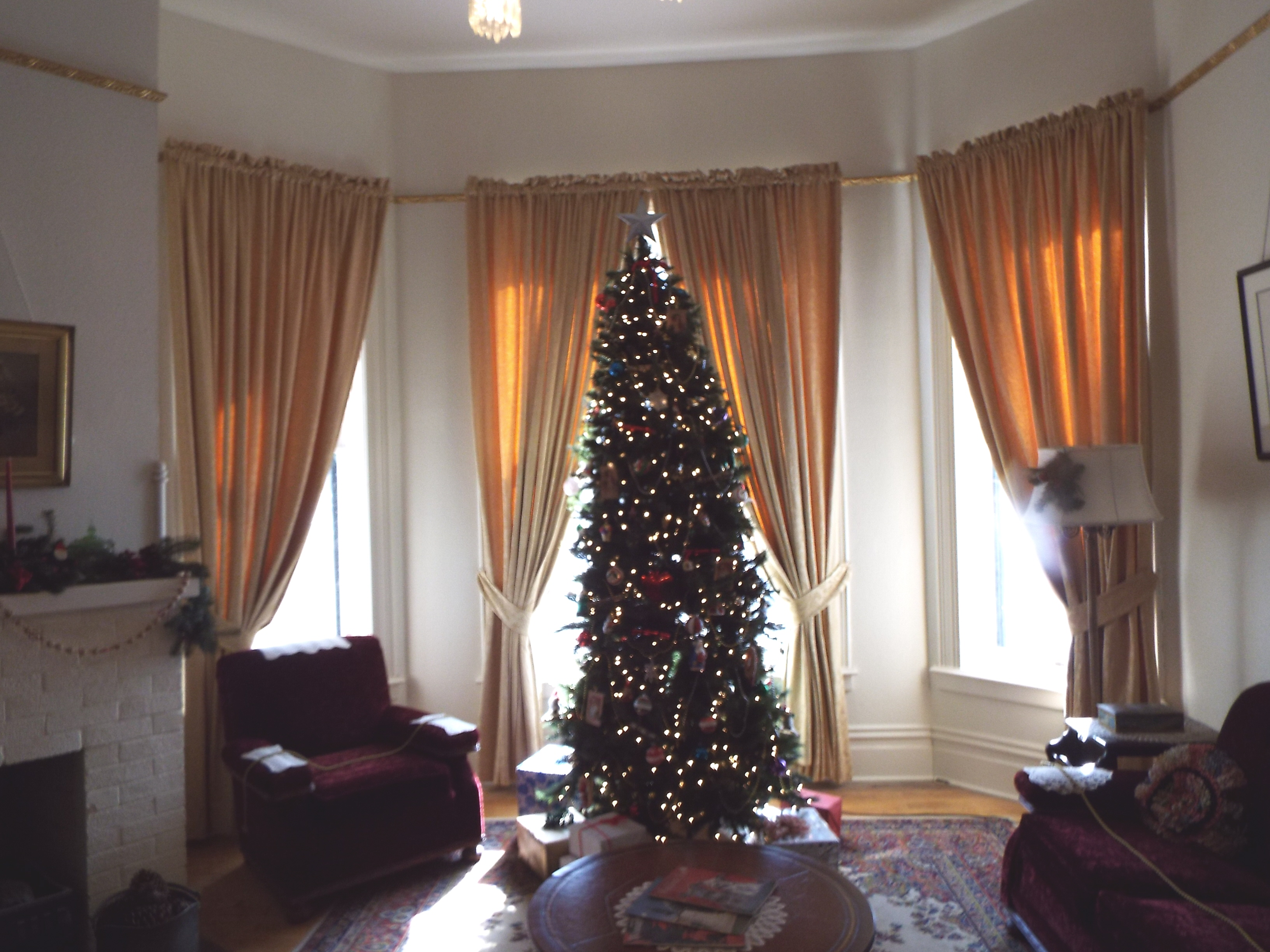
The Niels Petersen House living room.

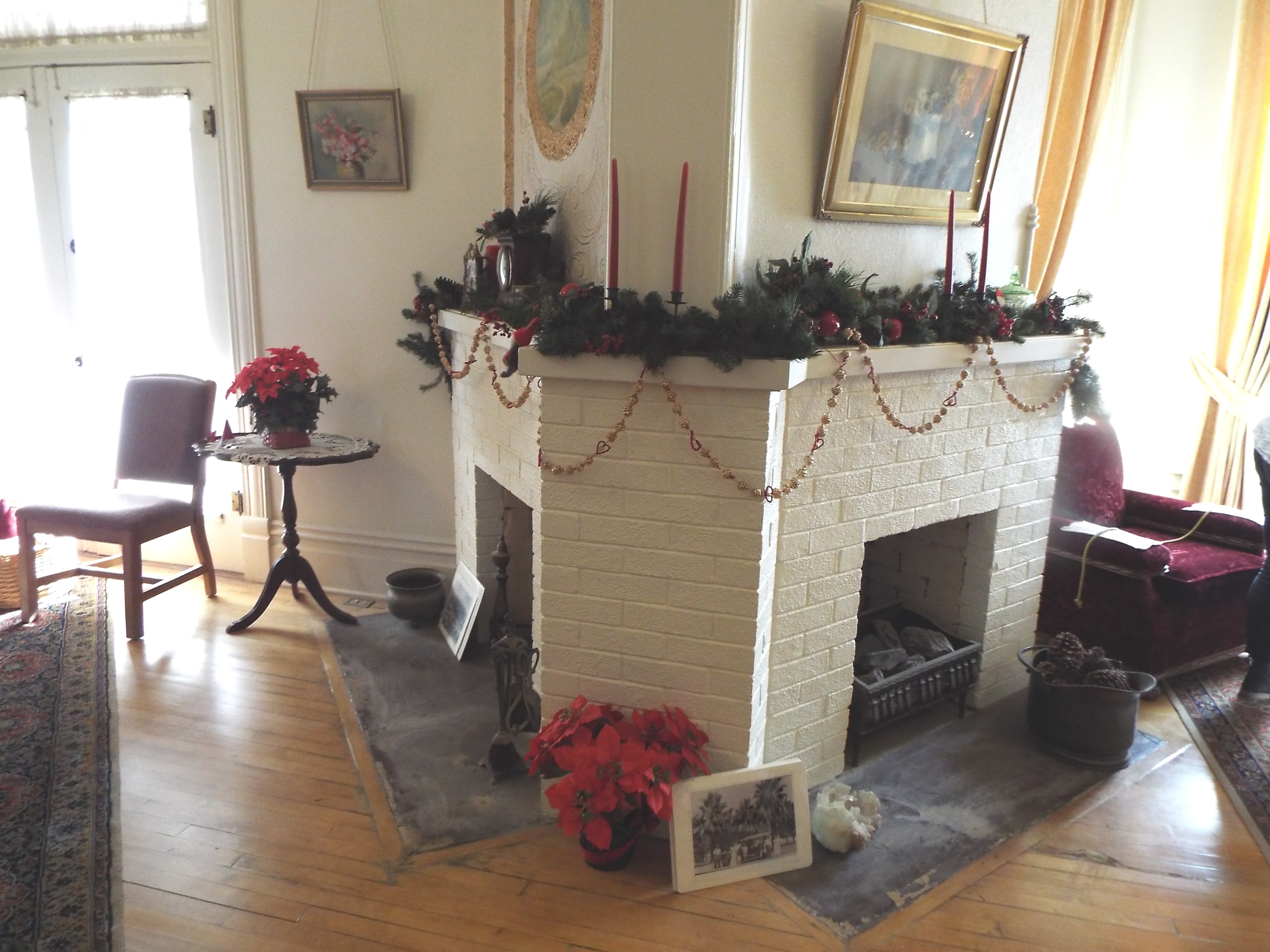
Double chimney in the Niels Petersen House living room.

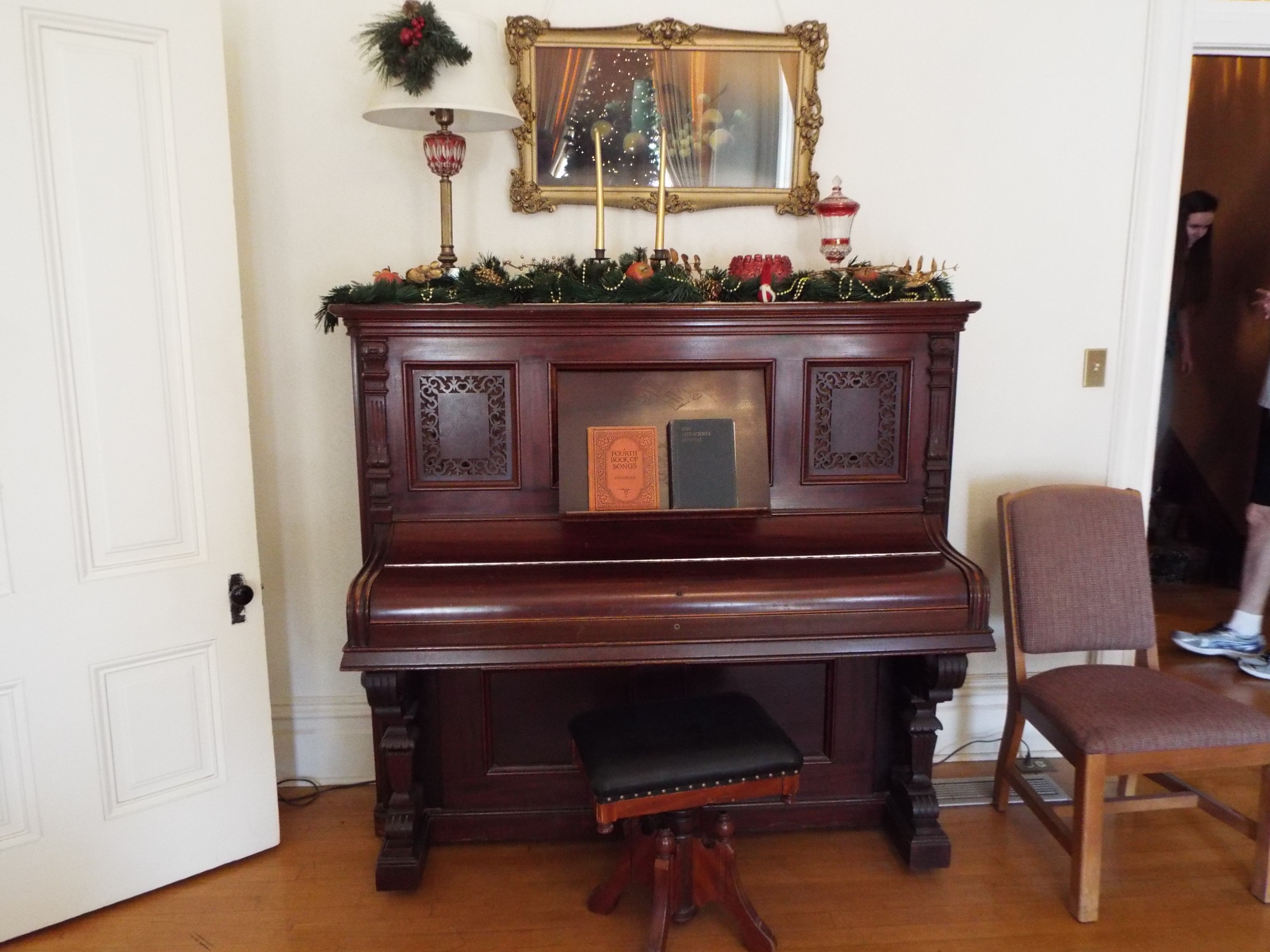
The Niels Petersen House living room piano.

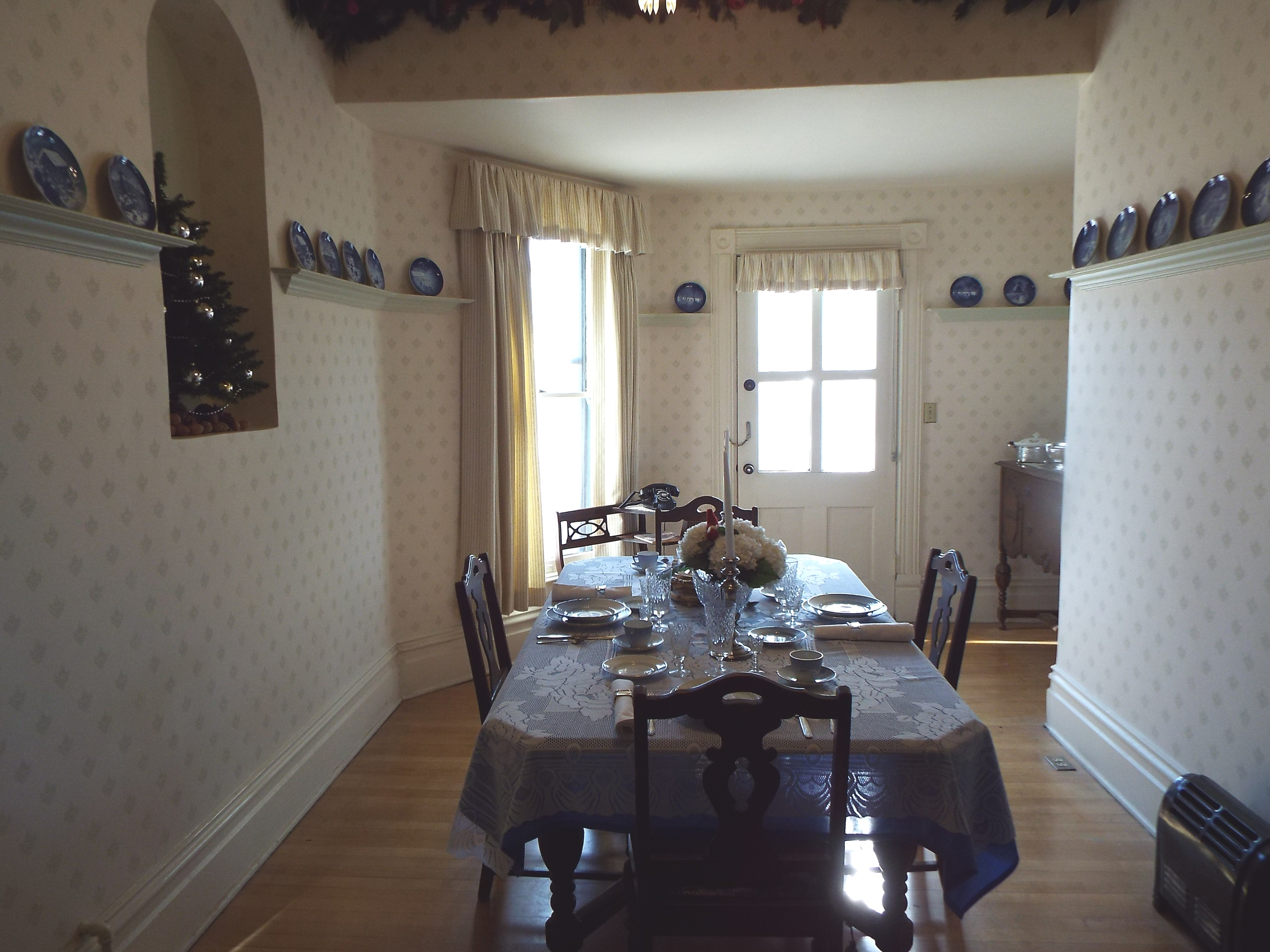
The Niels Petersen House dining room.

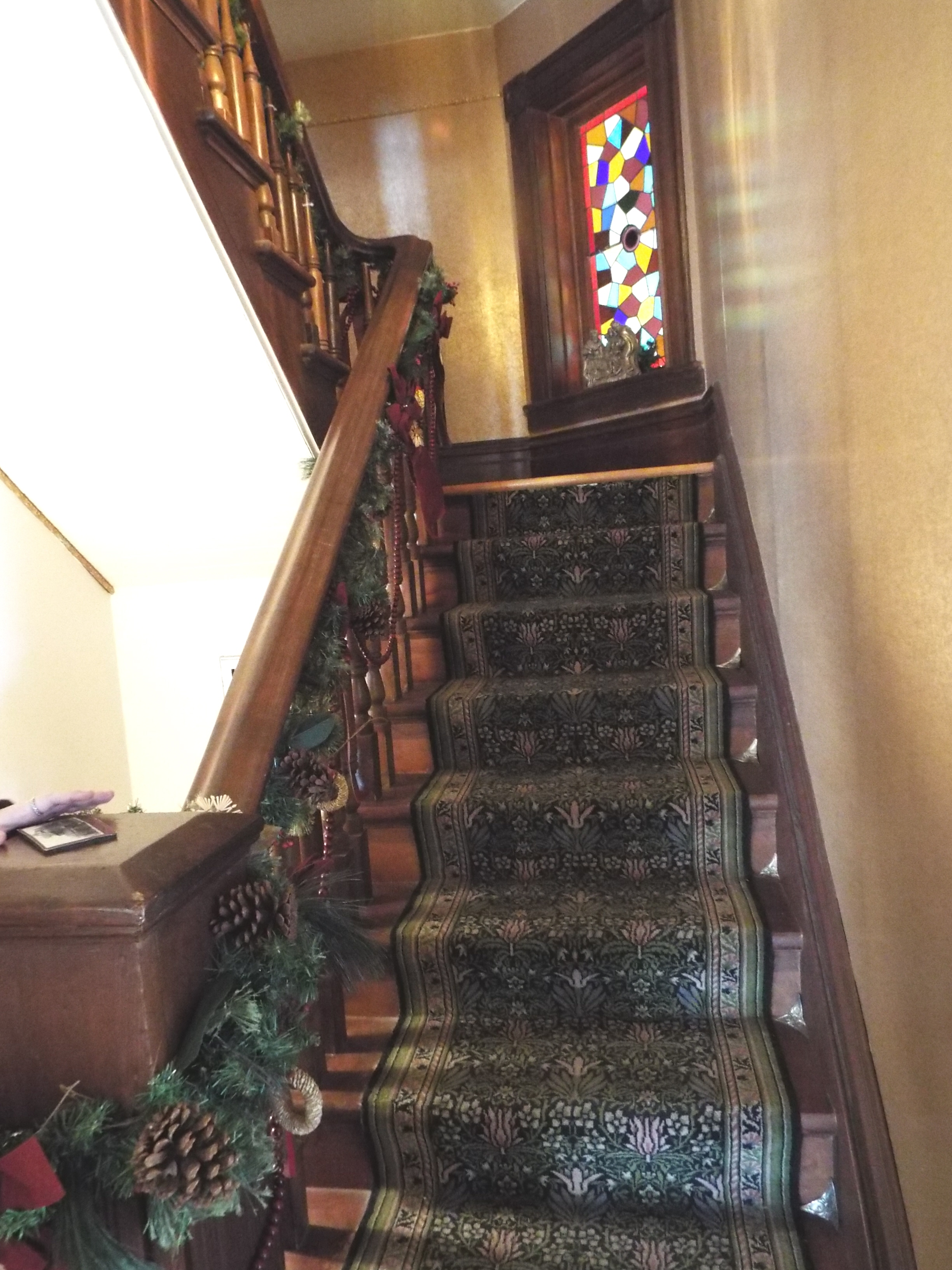
Staircase leading to the second floor of the Niels Petersen House.

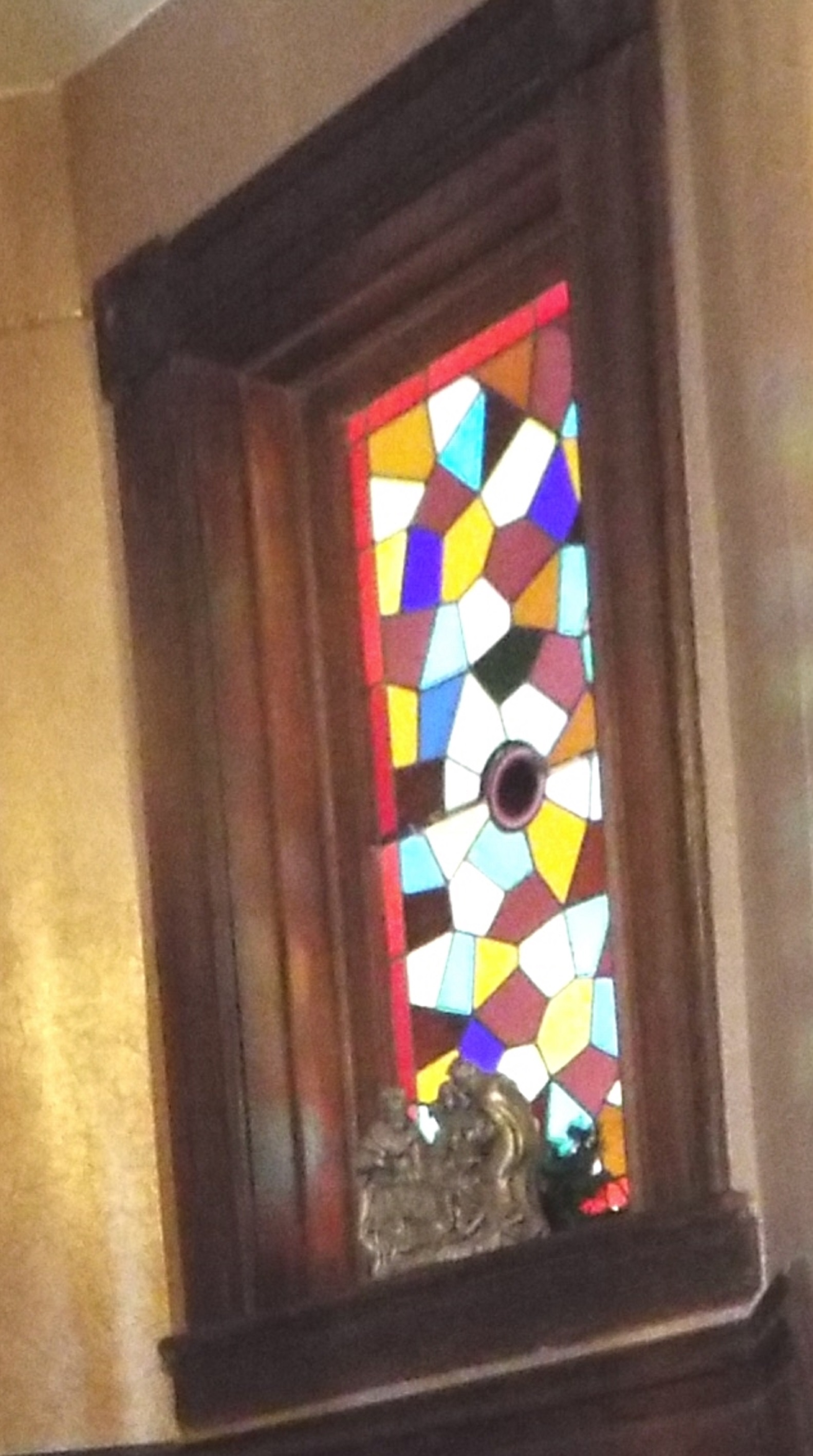
Stained Glass window on the staircase hall which leads to the second floor of the Niels Petersen House.

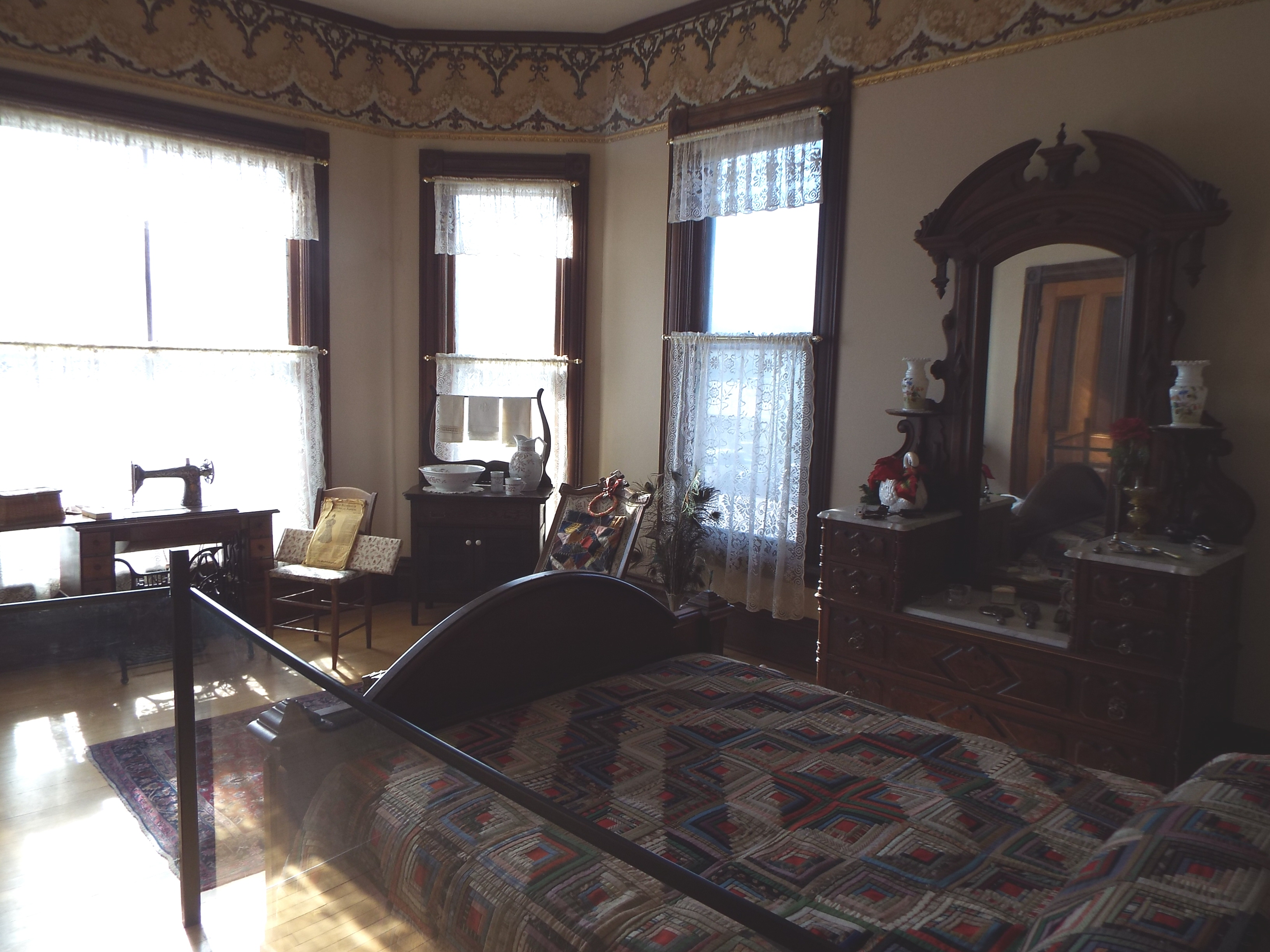
Bedroom in the Niels Petersen House.

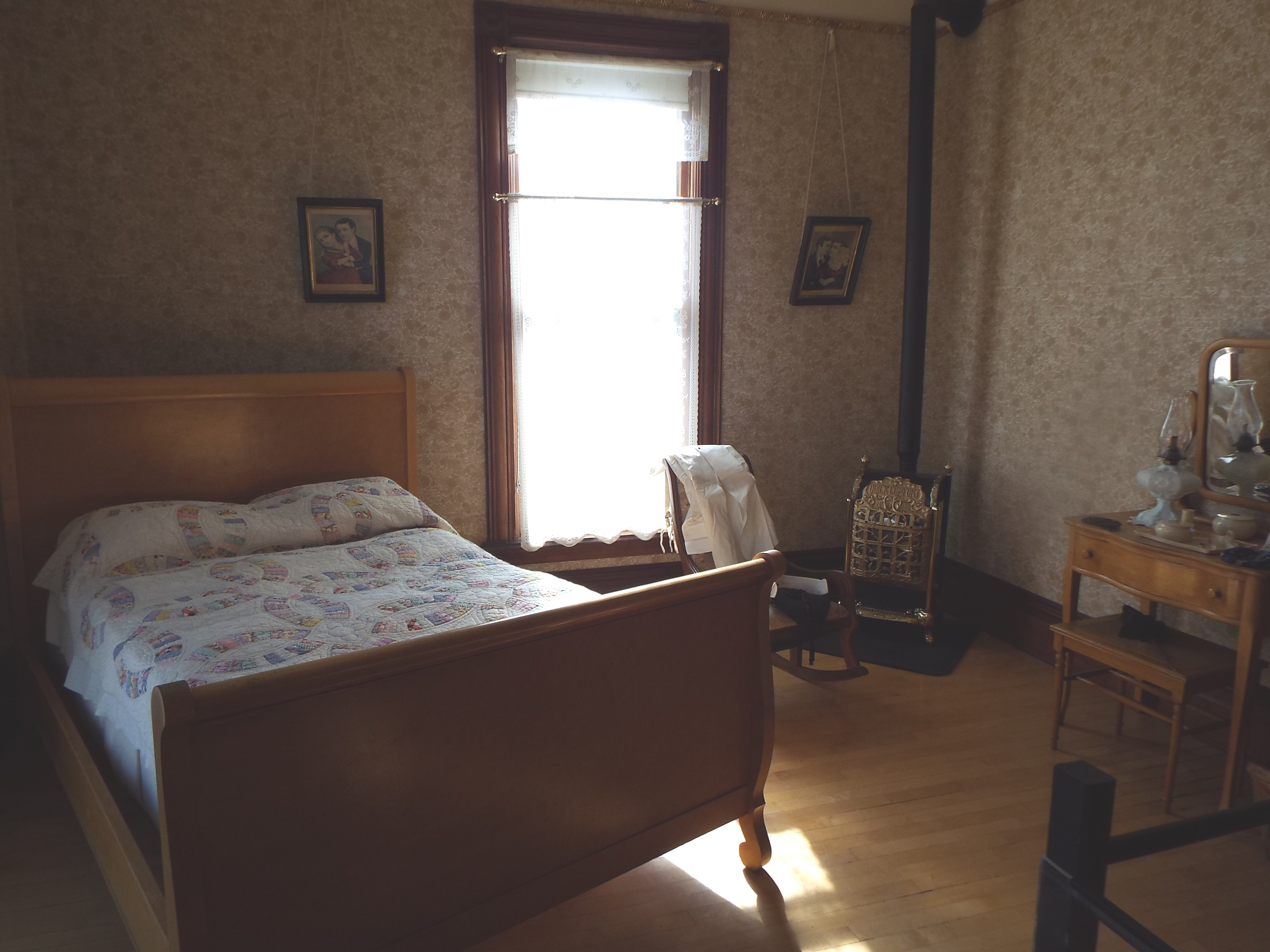
Bedroom in the Niels Petersen House..

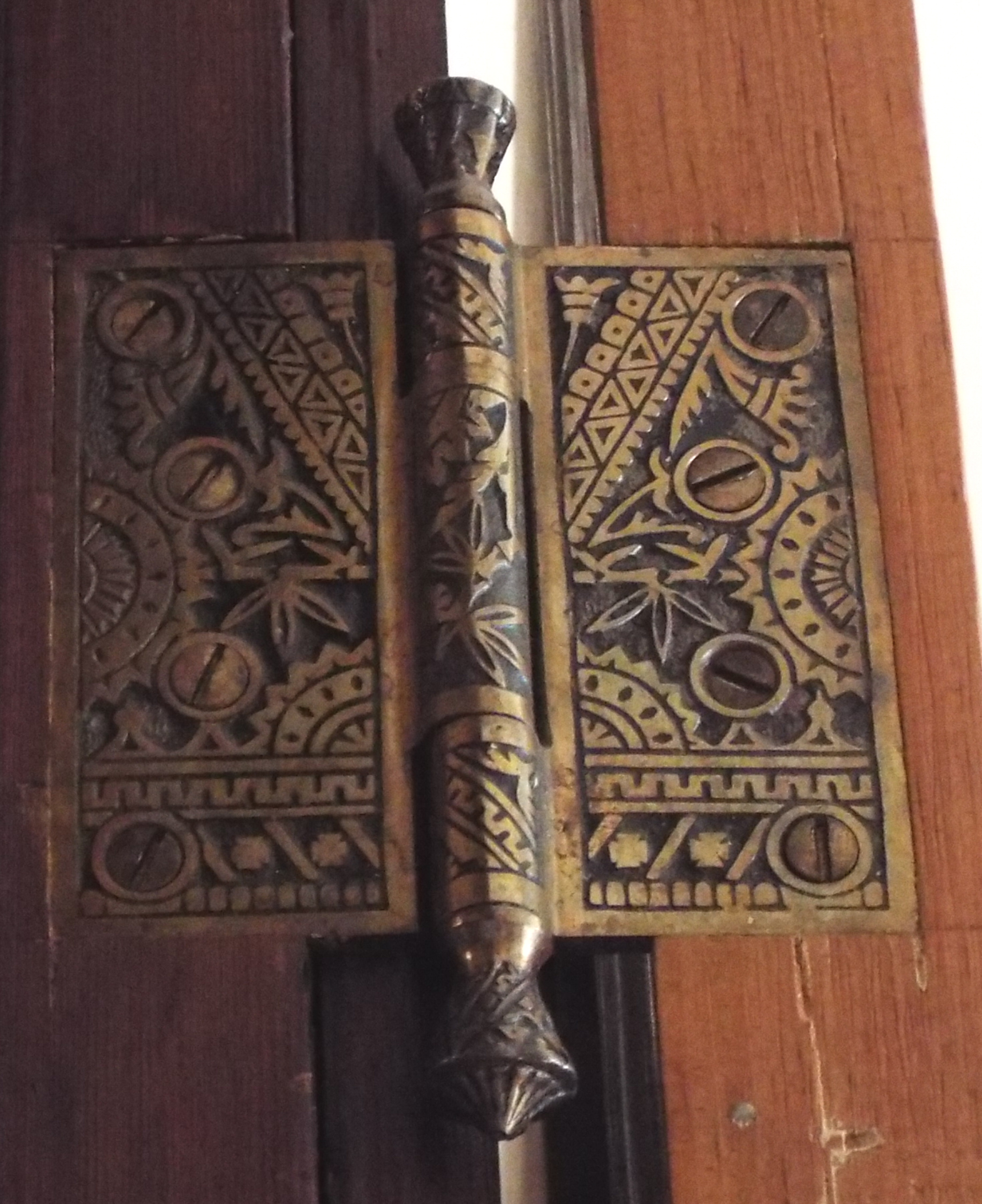
Art work on the original door hinges of the Niels Petersen House.

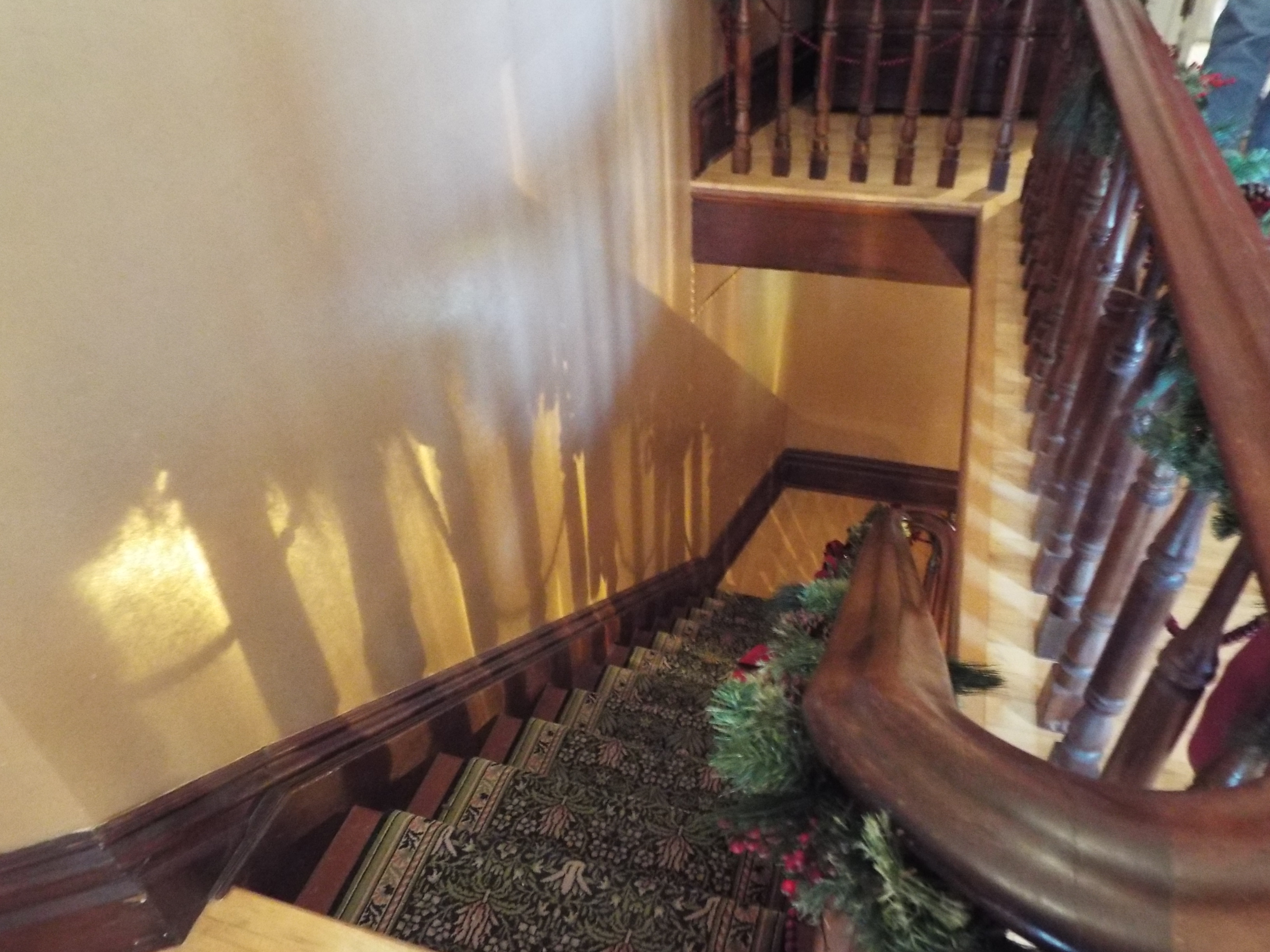
Staircase leading back to the first floor of the Niels Petersen House.

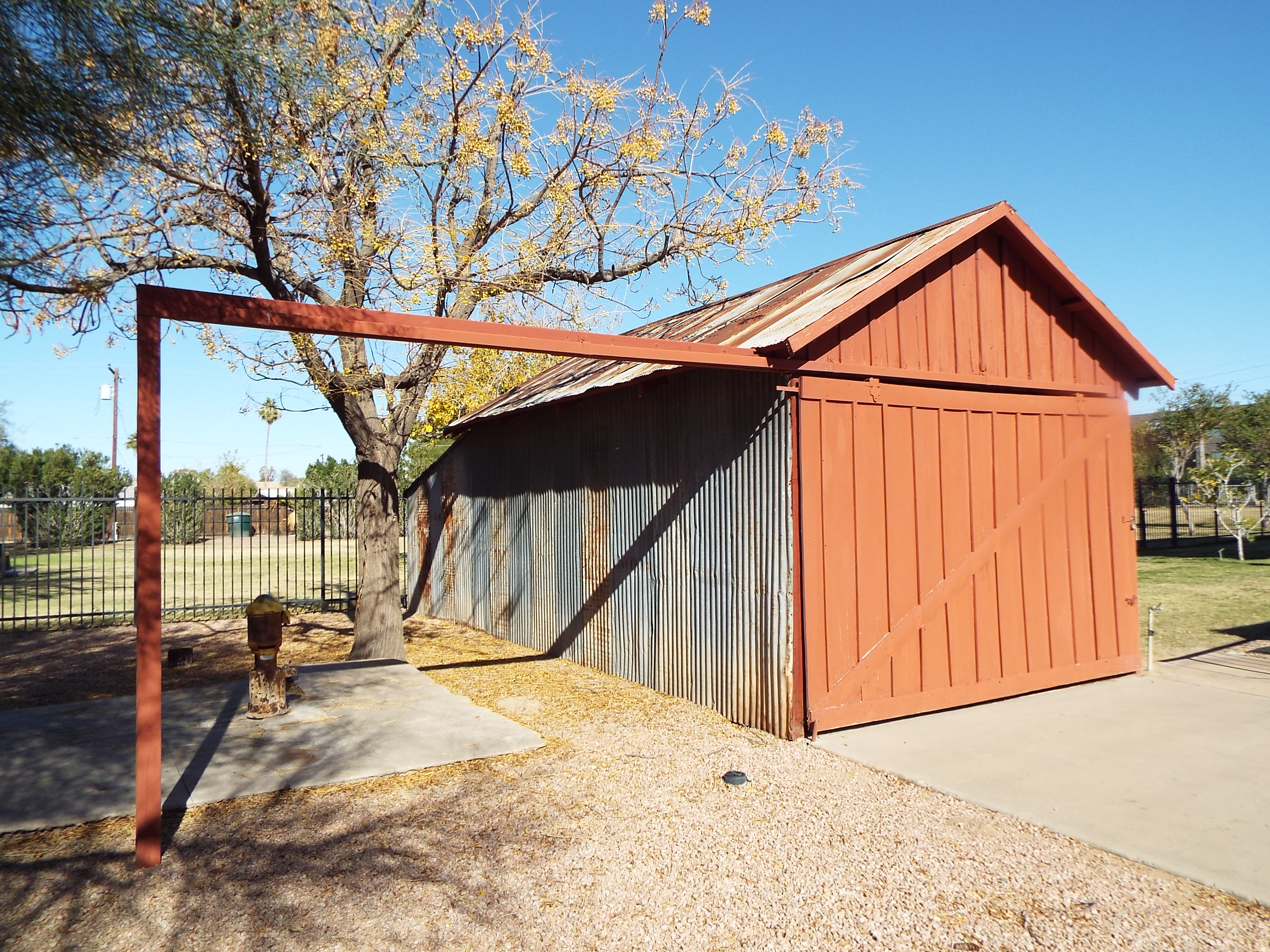
1892 tool shed located on the grounds of the Niels Petersen House.

== Double Butte Cemetery ==
Among the notable people who are buried in the Double Butte Cemetery of Tempe are the founder of Tempe, two Arizona governors, a United States Senator, a United States Congressman, 5 former Tempe mayors and various prominent pioneers.

Historic Double Butte Cemetery

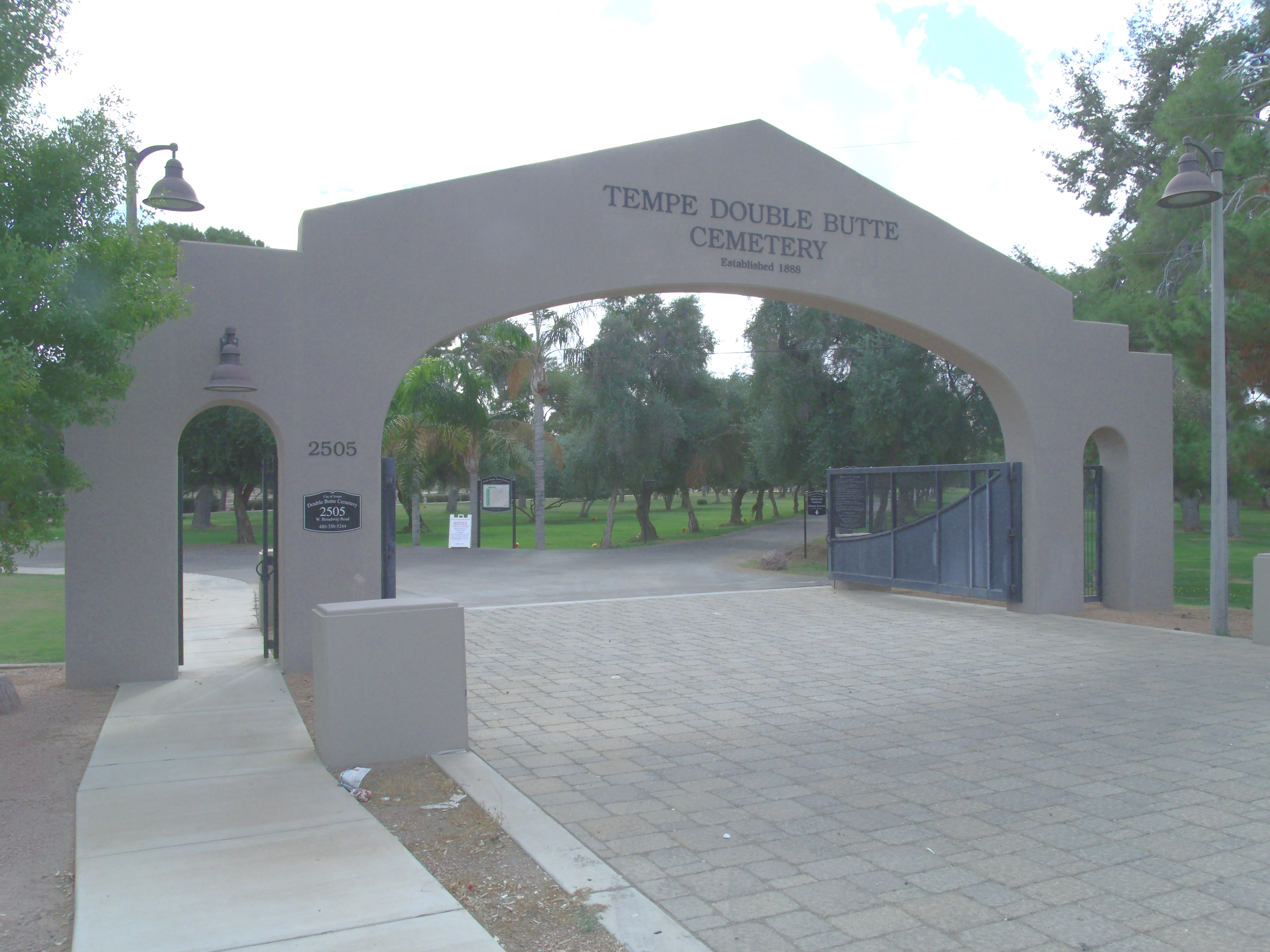
The Double Butte Cemetery was established in 1888 and is located at 2505 W. Broadway Rd. The cemetery was listed in the National Register of Historic Places on July 23, 2013, reference number 13000020.

(NRHP = National Register of Historic Places)
(THPS = Tempe Historic Property Survey)
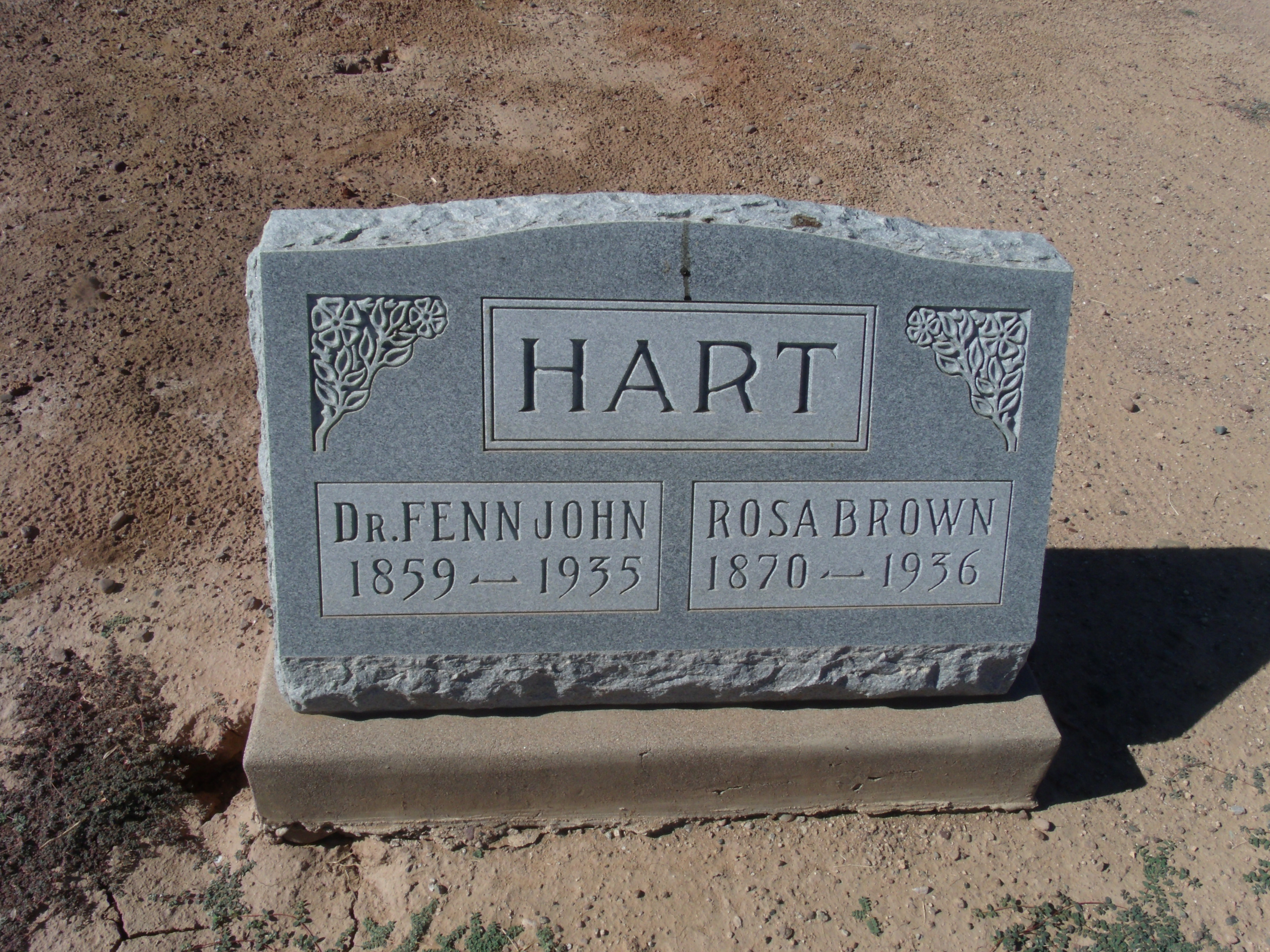
The grave of Dr. Fenn John Hart (1859–1935) and his wife Rosa Brown Hart (1870–1936). Dr. Fenn J. Hart was the first Mayor of Tempe. He served as such from 1894 to 1896. The Hart's are buried in sec. B of the Double Butte Cemetery.

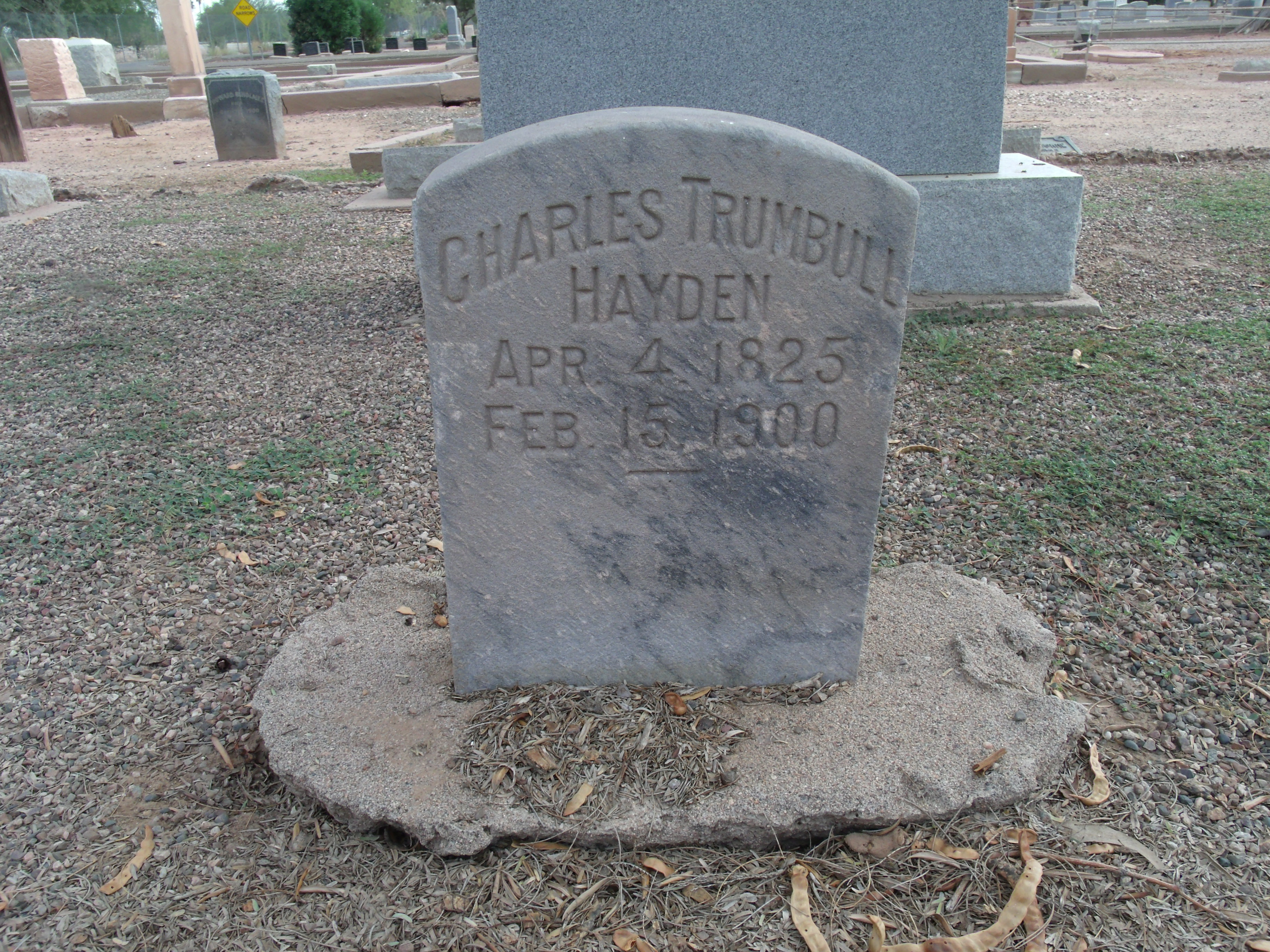
The grave site of Charles Trumbull Hayden (1825–1900). Hayden was the founder of the city of Tempe and the Arizona State University. He is the father of U.S. Senator Carl T. Hayden. Hayden is buried in sec. B–49.

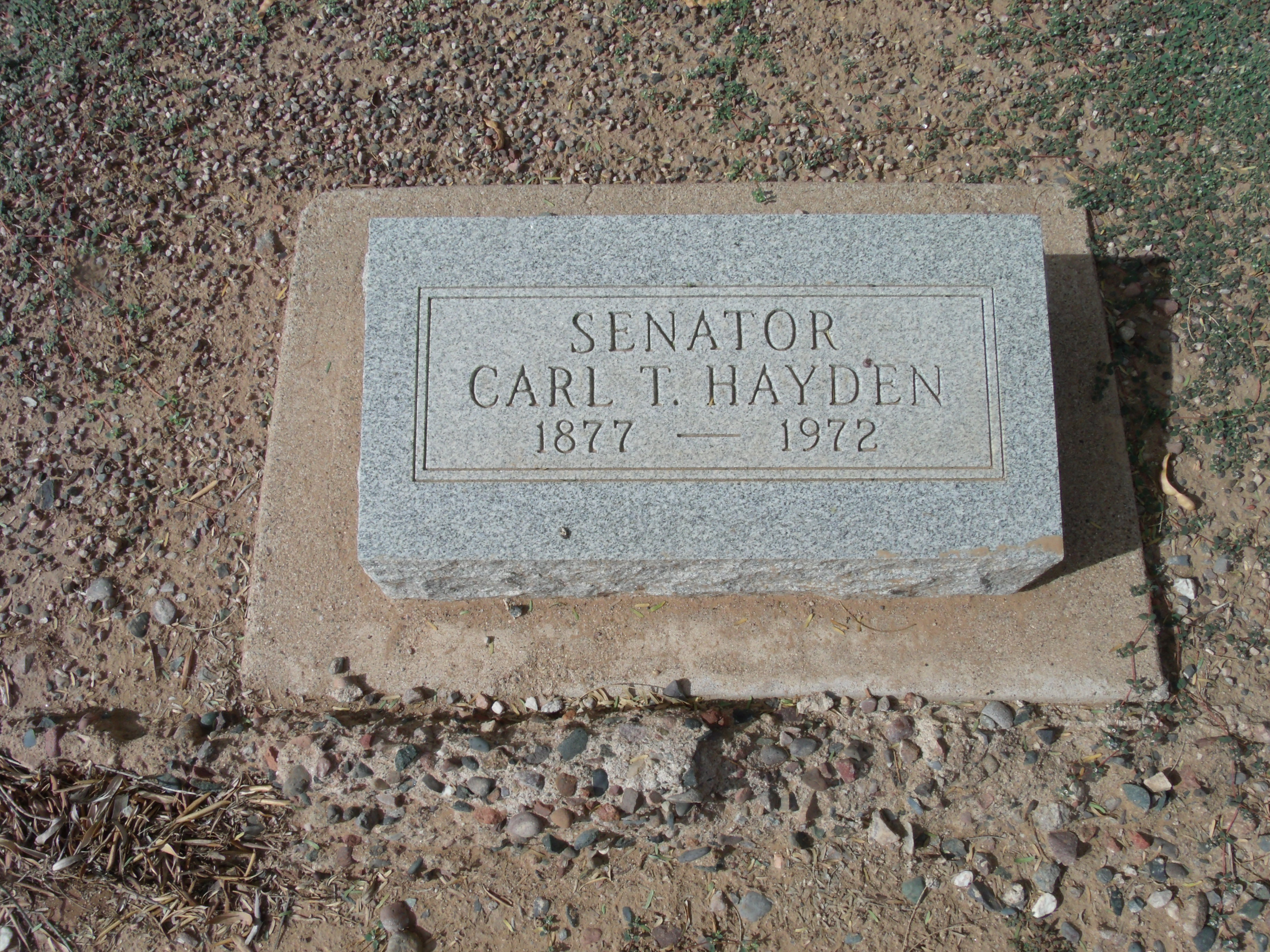
The grave site of Carl T. Hayden (1877–1972). Hayden was the first United States Senator to serve seven terms. He served as Arizona’s first representative for eight terms before entering the Senate, Hayden set the record for longest serving member of the United States Congress more than a decade before his retirement from politics. He is buried in sec. B-53

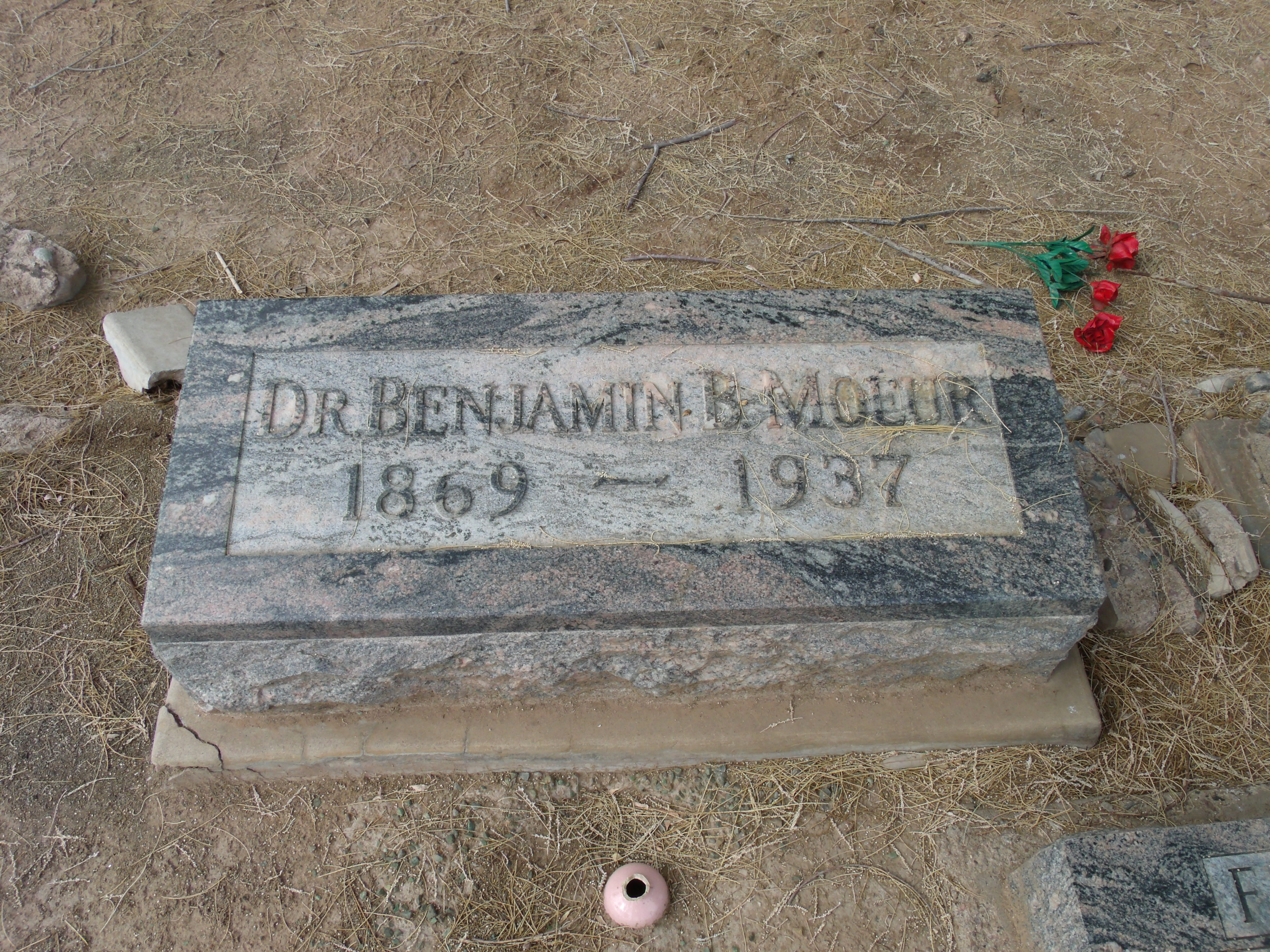
The grave site of Benjamin Baker Moeur (1869–1937). Moeur was the 4th Governor of Arizona (Arizona Governor, 1932:.1936). He is buried in sec. 04-283.

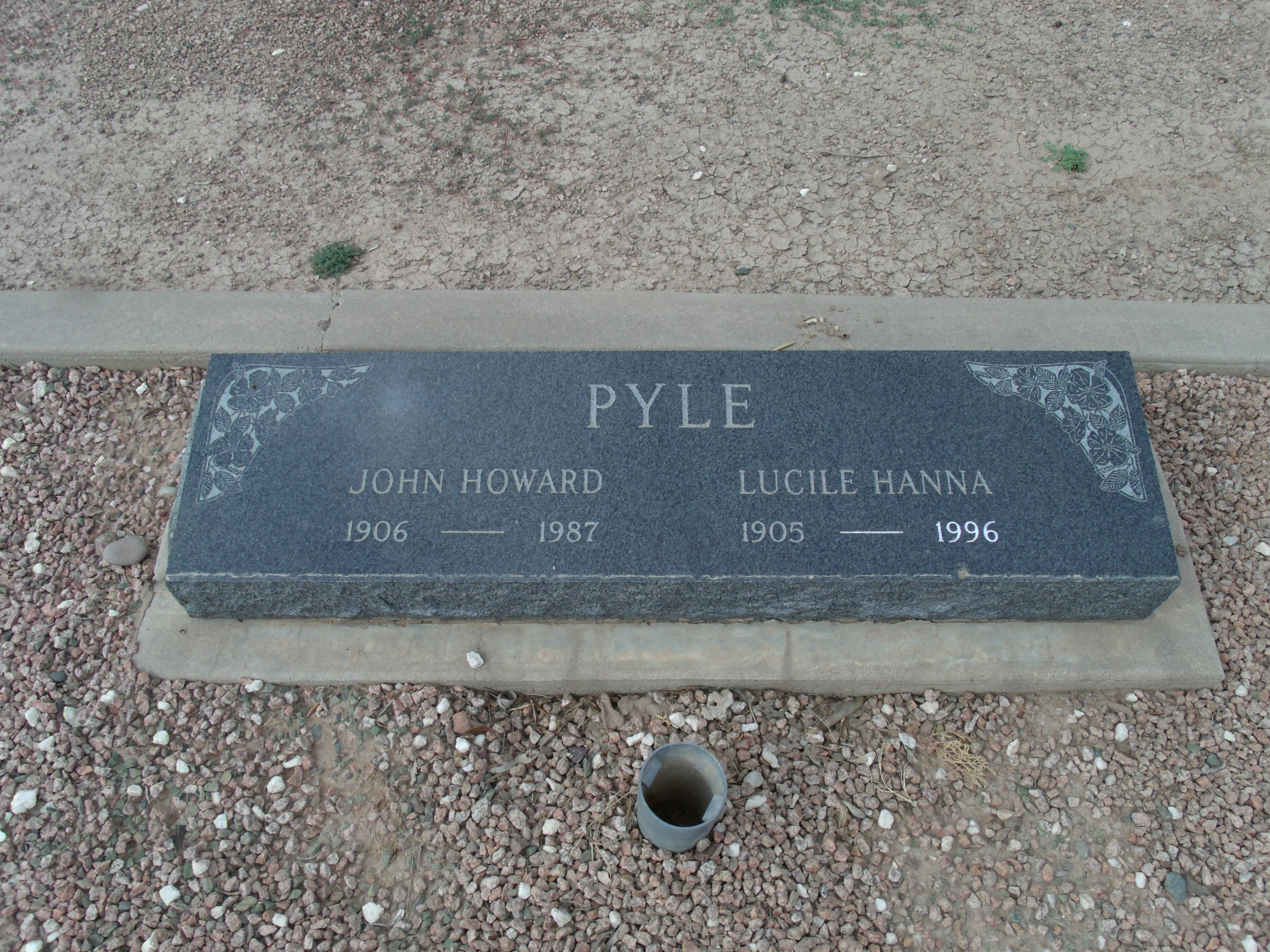
The grave site of John Howard Pyle (1906–1987). Pyle was the 9th Governor of Arizona (Arizona Governor, 1950–1954). He is buried in sec. 04-26.

== See also ==
- Double Butte Cemetery
- Tempe, Arizona
- National Register of Historic Places listings in Maricopa County, Arizona
