= List of historic properties in Chandler, Arizona =

- City
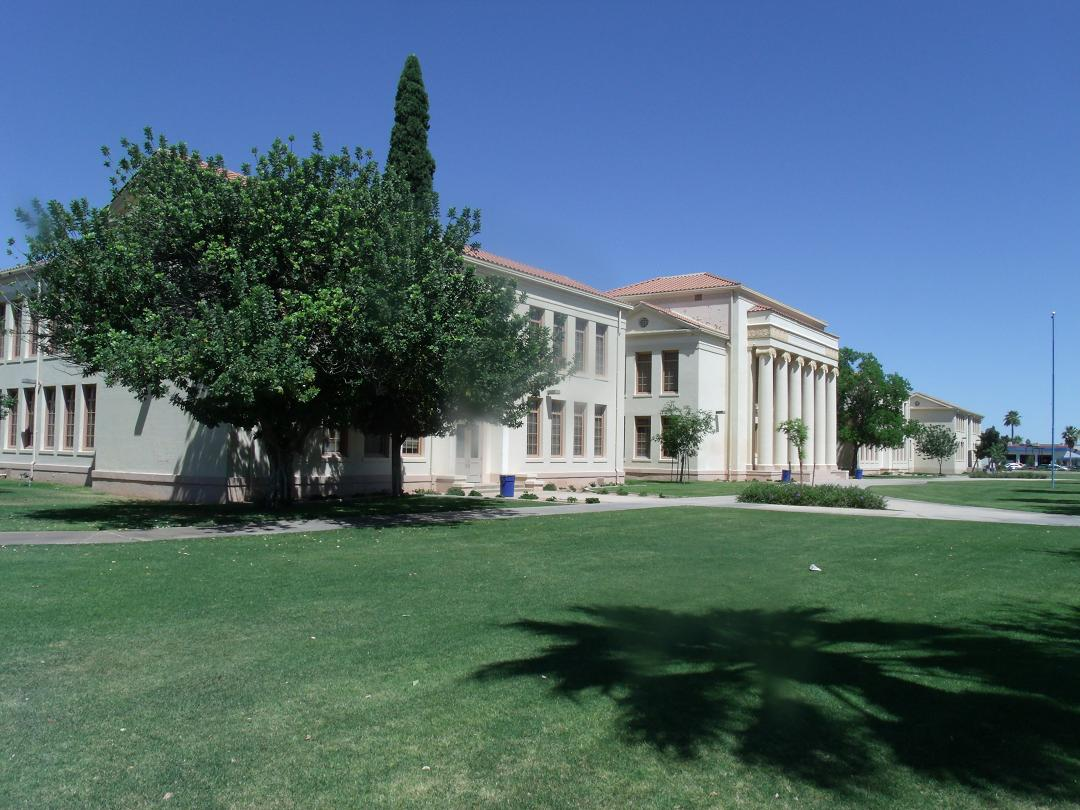
- Historic Chandler High School

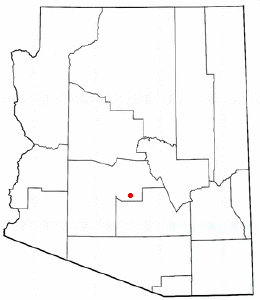
- Location in Maricopa County and the state of Arizona

This is a list, which includes a photographic gallery, of some of the remaining historic structures and monuments in Chandler, Arizona. Also included is a photographic gallery of the historic railroad equipment in the Arizona Railway Museum located in Chandler, which houses the Southern Pacific Railroad Locomotive No. SP 2562 and Tender No. 8365, the Railroad Steam Wrecking Crane and Tool Car and The Tucson, Cornelia & Gila Bend Caboose No. 15, which are listed in the National Register of Historic Places.

== Brief history ==
Chandler is a prominent suburb of the Phoenix, Arizona, Metropolitan Statistical Area (MSA). Chandler was founded on May 17, 1912, and incorporated as a city in 1920. The city has numerous historic properties which have been listed either in the National Register of Historic Places or considered as such by the Chandler Historical Society. There are also various landmarks and attractions within Chandler that are claimed to represent the best features of the city. These have been designated as such by the "Chandler Historical Society". The Chandler Historical Society was founded in 1969 as a non-profit corporation in order to collect artifacts related to the history and diversity of Chandler.

Not all of the historical properties are located within the downtown area of Chandler. There is a Southern Pacific Railroad Locomotive and a Railroad Steam Wrecking Crane and Tool Car which are listed in the National Register of Historic Places on display at the Arizona Railway Museum located at 330 E. Ryan Road.

== Historic structures and artifacts pictured ==
=== Buildings ===
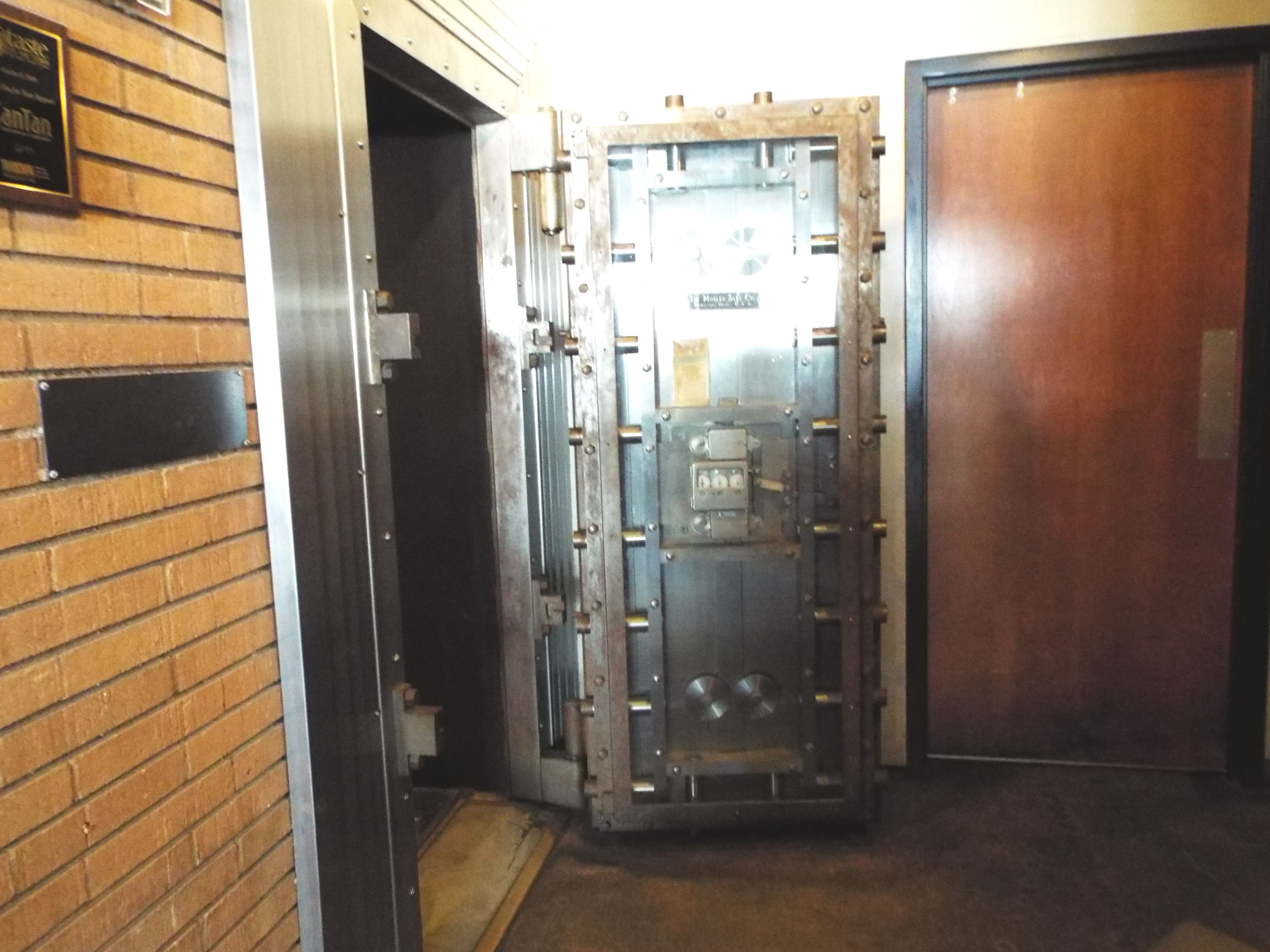
The original vault of the 1913 Bank of Chandler

The following buildings are among those pictured with a brief description:

- Chandler High School – built in 1900 and located in 350 N. Arizona Ave.The building is listed in the National Register of Historic Places, reference #07000836.
- The Suhwaro Hotel – built in 1900 and located in 58 W. Buffalo St. in Chandler, Arizona. Architectural Style: Mission/Spanish Revival. The building is listed in the National Register of Historic Places, reference #94000575.
- The Monroe Building – built in 1912. The building is located at 28 San Marcos Place. The Chamber met upstairs and the lower floors were leased to stores. Merchant E.W. Monroe, after whom the building is named, leased the first floor for the Monroe Hardware Company, Chandler's first hardware company. In 1915, the top floor space was converted into Chandler's first movie theater, where silent pictures were shown. In 1919, the second floor became offices for Chandler's first attorney Arthur E. Price, after whom Price Road is named. The building is listed as historical by the Chandler Historical Society.
- The Dobson Building – built in 1912 and is located at 64 S. San Marcos Place. John H. Dobson, who first homesteaded in the Mesa area in the 1890s, was one of the most instrumental men in Chandler's early history, financing many private and public ventures, as well as establishing the First National Bank in 1919. Dobson Road is named after him. The building is listed as historical by the Chandler Historical Society.
- The Morrison Grocery Building – built in 1912 and is located at 40 S. San Marcos Place. The Morrison Brothers, Ernest and Leroy, were perhaps the first grocers in Chandler. Arthur Price bought the building in 1937 and it was later occupied by the Chandler Electric Company. The building is listed as historical by the Chandler Historical Society.
- Hotel San Marcos – built in 1913 and officially opening its doors to the public on November 22, 1913. Among the 500 guests present during the opening ceremonies were Arizona Governor George W. P. Hunt and United States Vice President Thomas R. Marshall. It is now named the Crowne Plaza San Marcos Hotel. Listed in the National Register of Historic Places in 1982, reference: #82002078.
- The San Marcos Hotel Extension – This building was part of the San Marcos Hotel built in 1913 and is located at 10 San Marcos Place. The basement served as a speakeasy during the prohibition era (1920-1933).
- The Bank of Chandler _ built in 1913. The building is located at 80 San Marcos Place.
- The Hotel Chandler Building – built in 1914. The building is located at 98 San Marcos Place. Chandler's first elected mayor, David A. Jacobson, financed the construction of this building. The bottom floor was leased out for stores, and the second story was a reasonably priced hotel, an affordable alternative to the San Marcos Resort. Many prominent Chandler businessmen, especially those working downtown, kept permanent residence in rooms at the hotel. The building is listed as historical by the Chandler Historical Society.
- The Price Building – built in 1914 and is located at 80 S. San Marcos Place. It is named for Arthur E. Price, who owned it at one time. Price, Chandler's first attorney, drafted Chandler's incorporation charter in 1920. Price Road is named after him. The building is listed as historical by the Chandler Historical Society.
- The Andersen Building – built in 1914 and is located at 72 S. San Marcos Place. Town Attorney Arthur Price spent time playing dominoes here and had his mail forwarded here. The building is listed as historical by the Chandler Historical Society.
- The Goodyear Cotton Ranch House – built in 1917 and located at 4423 East. Basha's Road.
- The Arrow Pharmacy building – built in 1918 and is located at 11 W Boston St.. John B. “Doc” Weber operated Weber's Arrow Pharmacy for years. After over 85 years of service to the Chandler community, the doors closed for the first time in July 2005. The building is listed as historical by the Chandler Historical Society.
- The Dobson House – built in 1919 by John Dobson and located at 35 East Fairway Court.
- The Reliable Hardware Store Building – built in 1919. Alva Morgareidge, a town councilman and member of the school board, opened for business December 8, 1919. The building is located at 17 West Boston Street. The building is listed as historical by the Chandler Historical Society.
- The 1st. National Bank Building – built in 1919. The building is located at 35 West Boston Street. The building is listed as historical by the Chandler Historical Society.
- The Friedberg Building – built in 1919. The building is located at 67 West Boston Street. Joseph Friedberg, a dry goods merchant and owner of the building, got his start with a storeroom in the San Marcos Hotel. The building is listed as historical by the Chandler Historical Society.
- The Gilbert Building – built in 1919. The building is at 71 West Boston Street. Dr. Gilbert came to Chandler in 1913 and set up his practice in a tent. For years he was Chandler's only physician. In 1918, he purchased this lot with the financial assistance of John H. Dobson. The following year, Gilbert's permanent office was constructed here. The building is listed as historical by the Chandler Historical Society.
- The Menhennet/Rowena Theater Building – built in 1920. The building is located at 81 West Boston Street. This theater building was equipped with all the most modern amenities available in 1920, seating 600 patrons and complete with a heating and cooling system. Bill Menhennet opened this theater as the Chandler Theater in 1922, and also was the proprietor of the original theater in the Monroe building. The building is listed as historical by the Chandler Historical Society.
- The McCormick Building – built in 1928 and is located at 149 West Boston Street. It originally housed the I.O.O.F. (Independent Order of Odd Fellows) Hall and Armory. The building is listed as historical by the Chandler Historical Society.
- The Esber Store Building- built in 1919. The building is located at 51 East Boston Street. The building is listed as historical by the Chandler Historical Society.
- The Basha's Grocery Store – built in 1932 and located at 2462 South Basha's Road. This was the first of the Basha's Suipermarket chain in Arizona.
- The Winn School – built in 1939 and located 85 E, Saragoza Road.
- The O.S. Stapley Hardware Store Building – built in 1947. The O.S. Stapley Hardware Company was a prominent company in the Salt River Valley, with branches in Mesa, Glendale, and Phoenix. In Chandler, many families purchased their farm equipment. The building is located at 63 East Boston Street. The building is listed as historical by the Chandler Historical Society.
Historic buildings in Chandler
(NRHP = National Register of Historic Places)
(CHS=Chandler Historical Society)
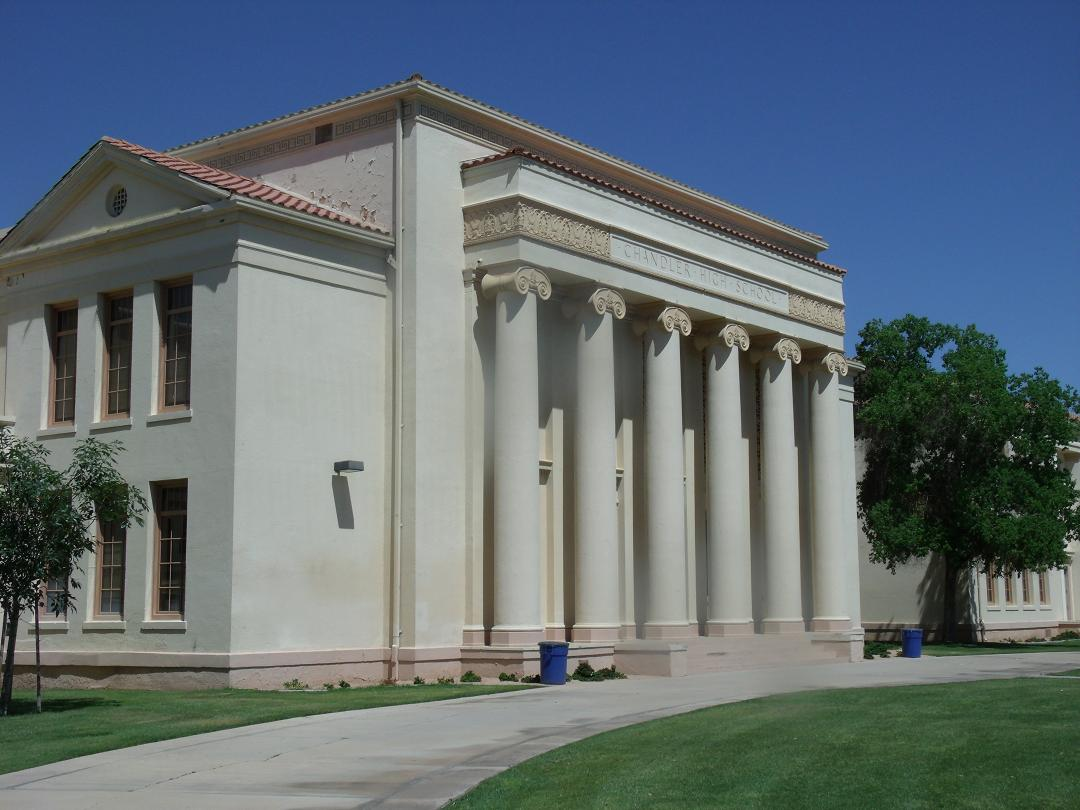
Chandler High School

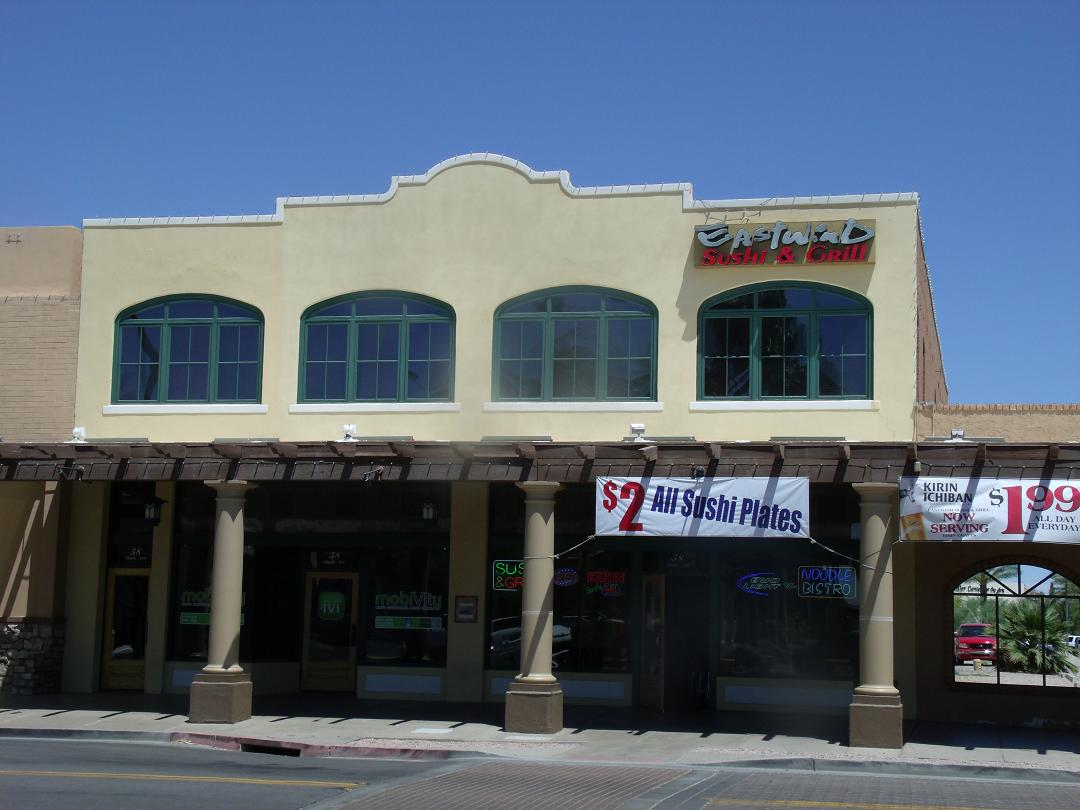
Suhwaro Hotel

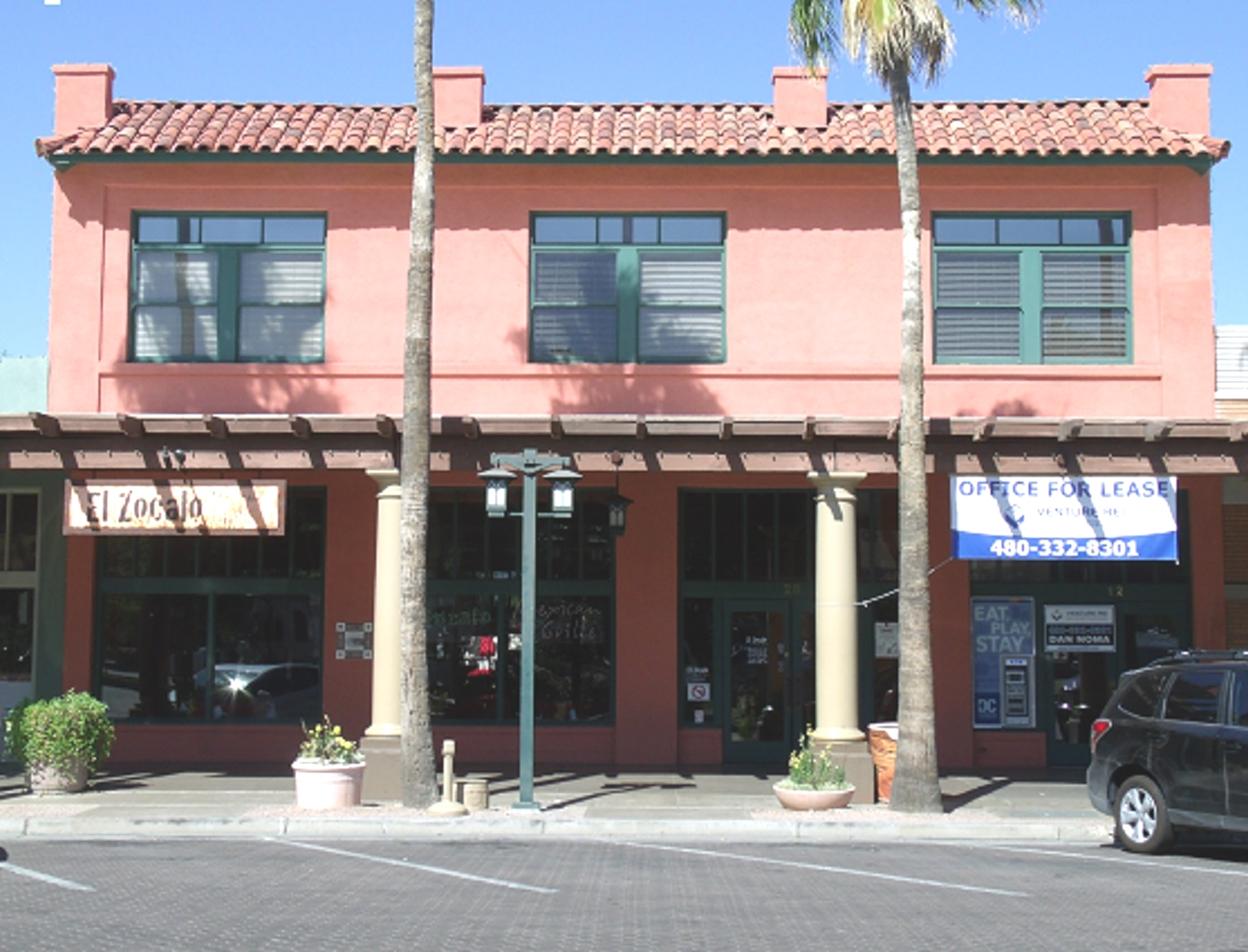
The Monroe Building

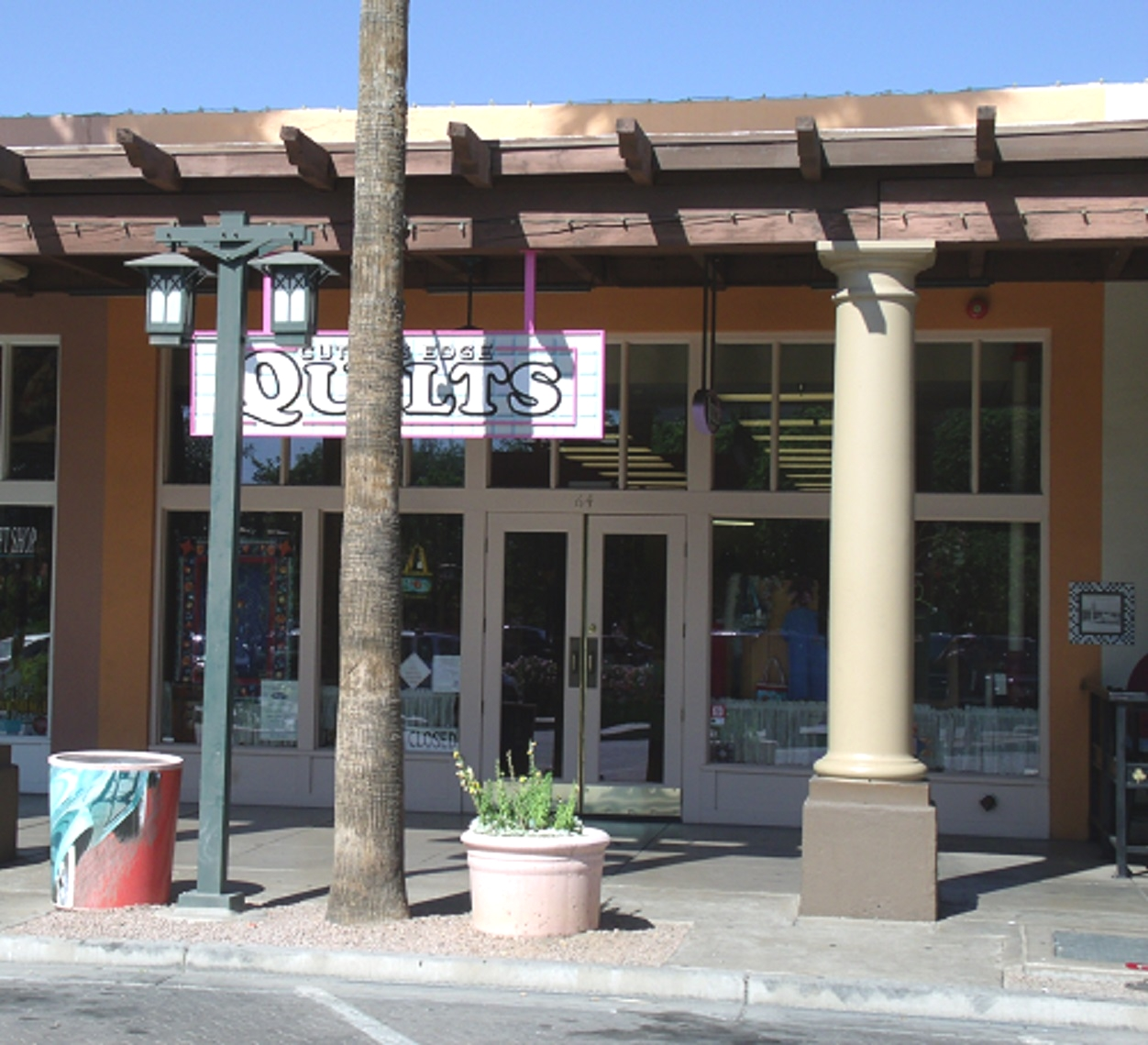
The Dobson Building

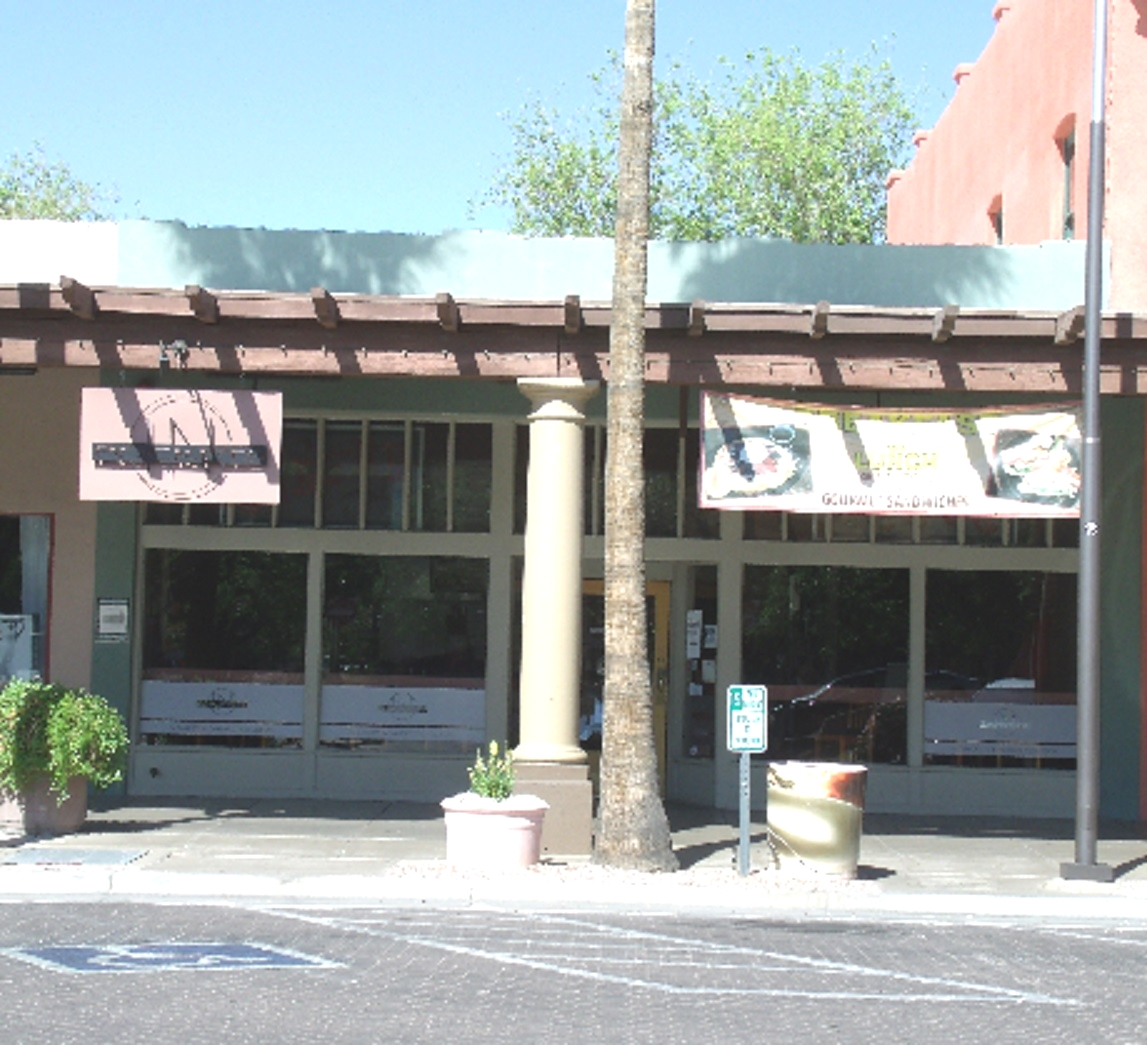
The Morrison Grocery Building

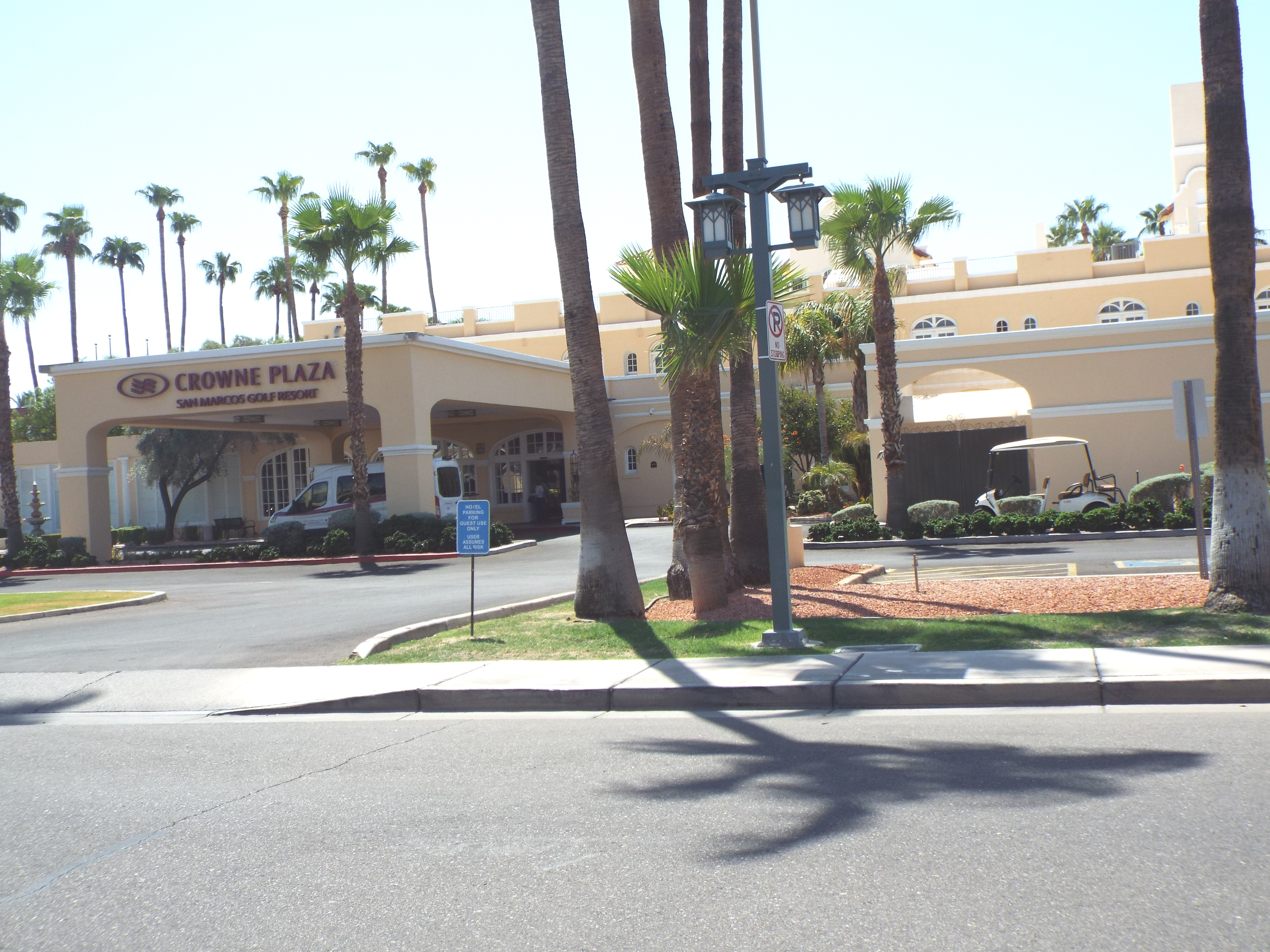
San Marcos Hotel

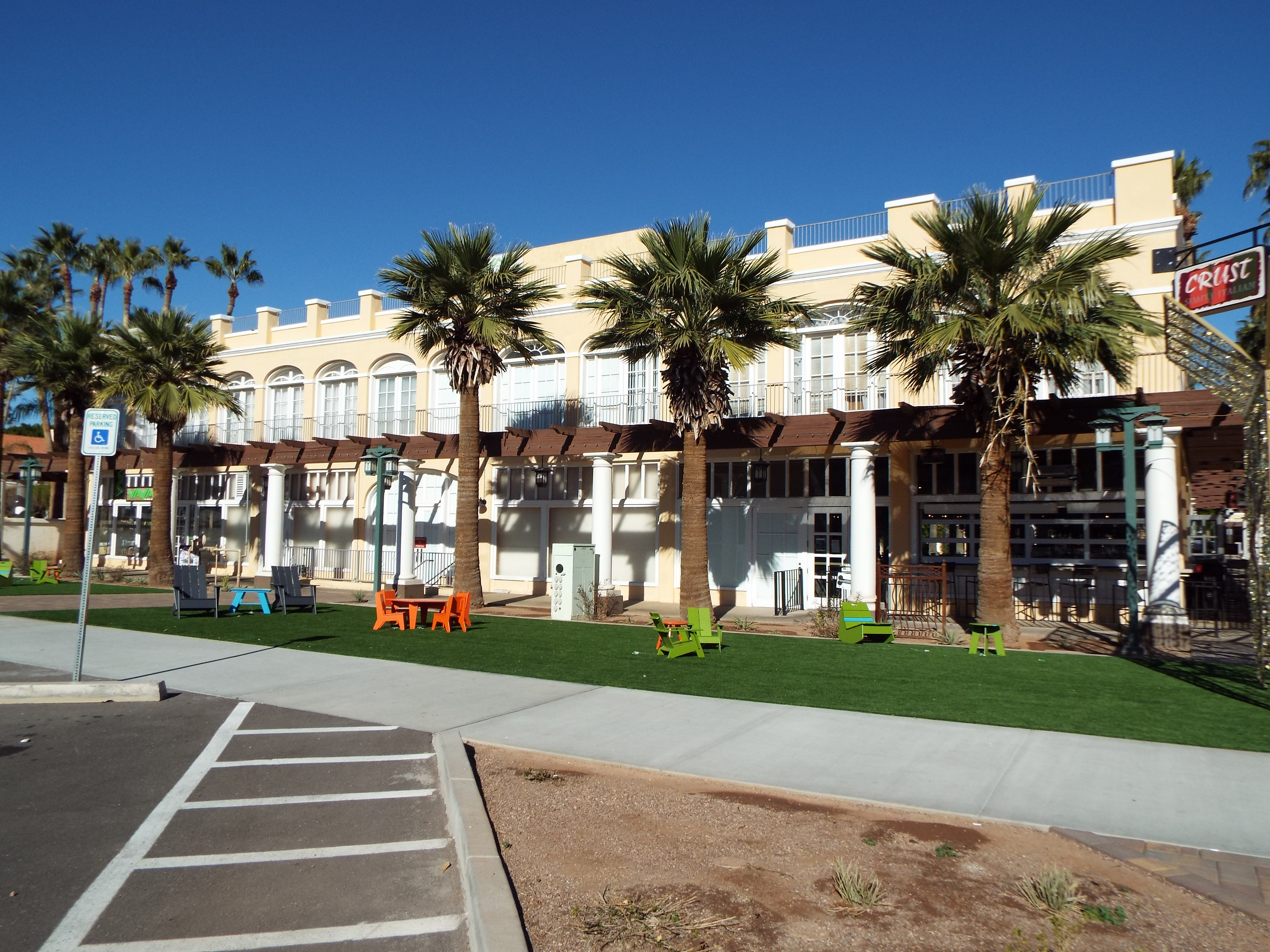
San Marcos Hotel extension.

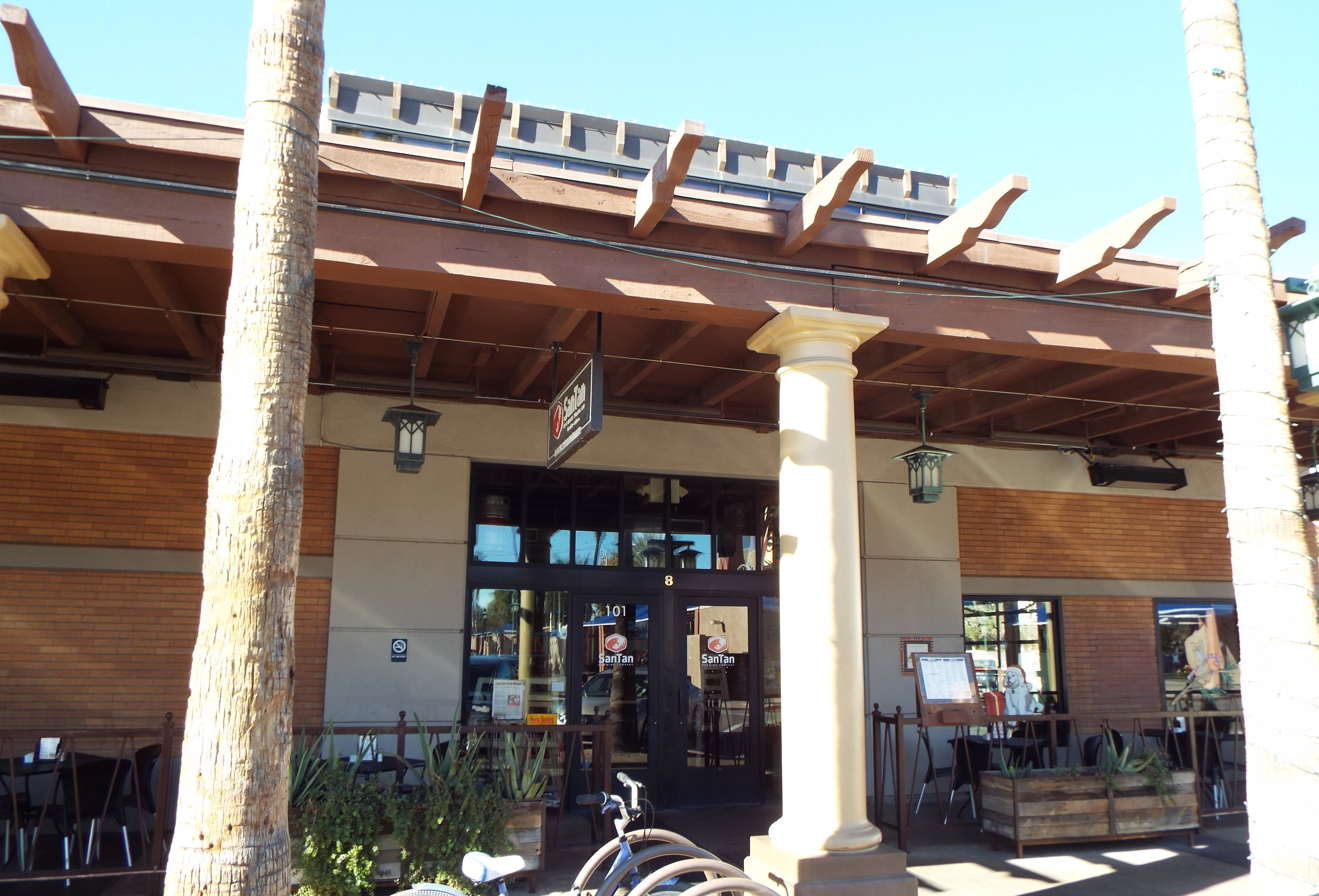
Bank of Chandler

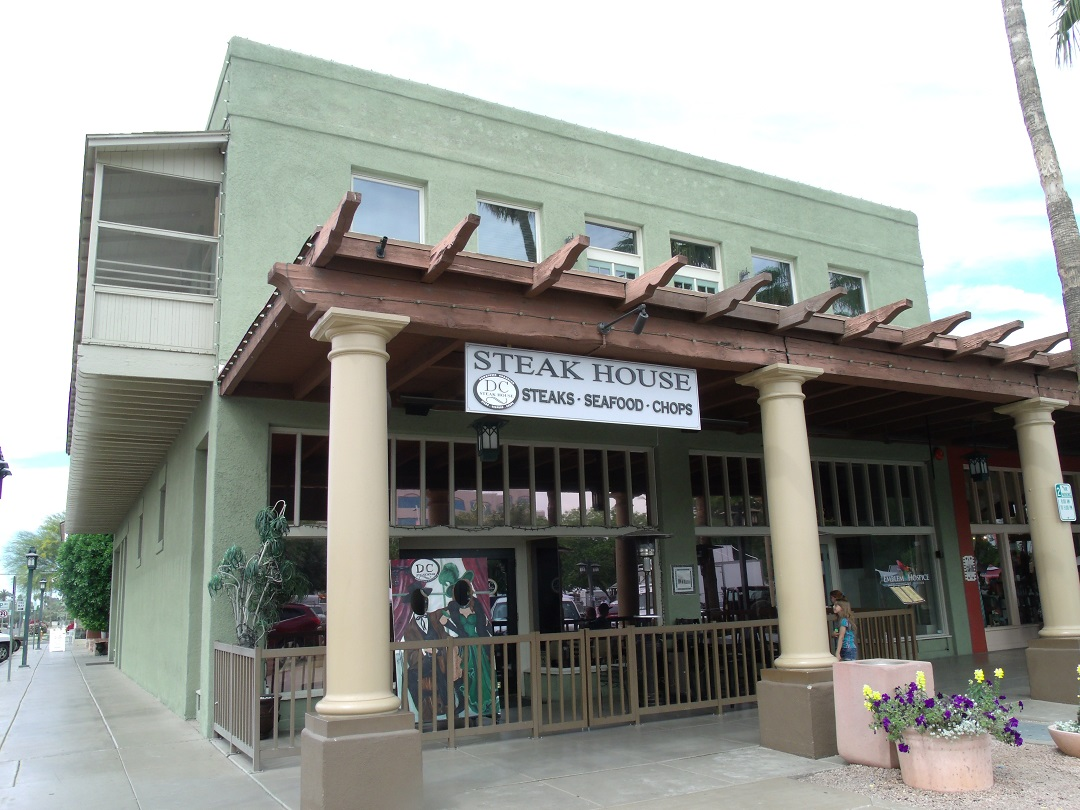
The Hotel Chandler Building

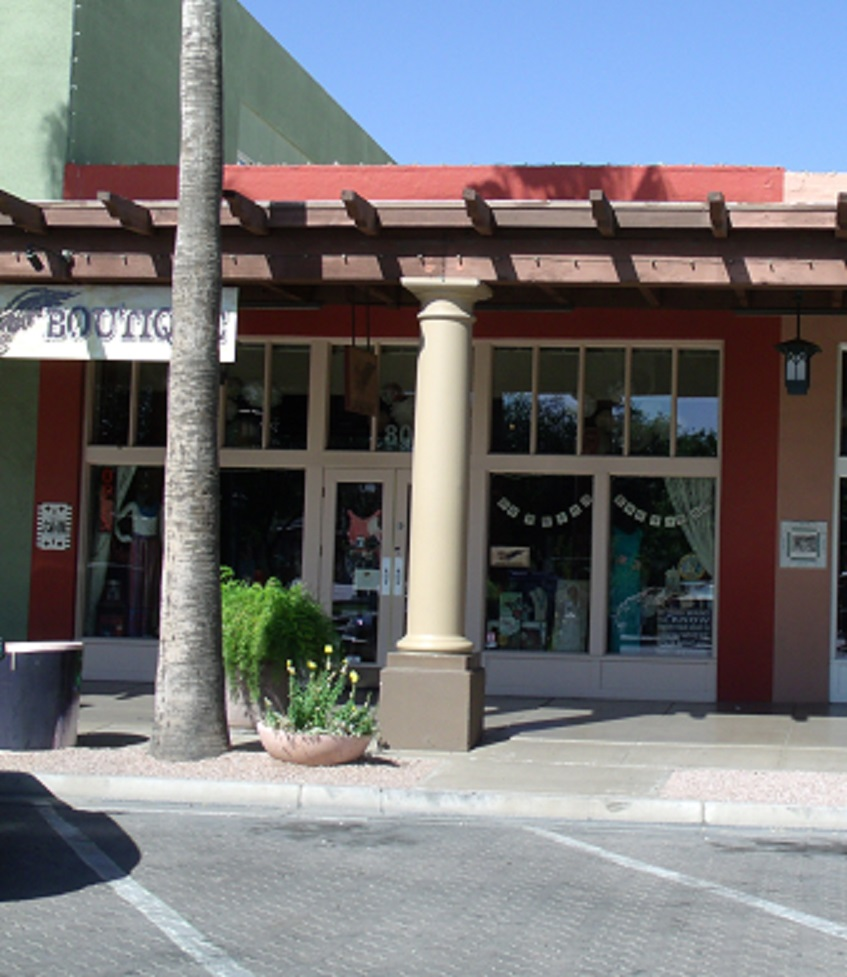
The Price Building

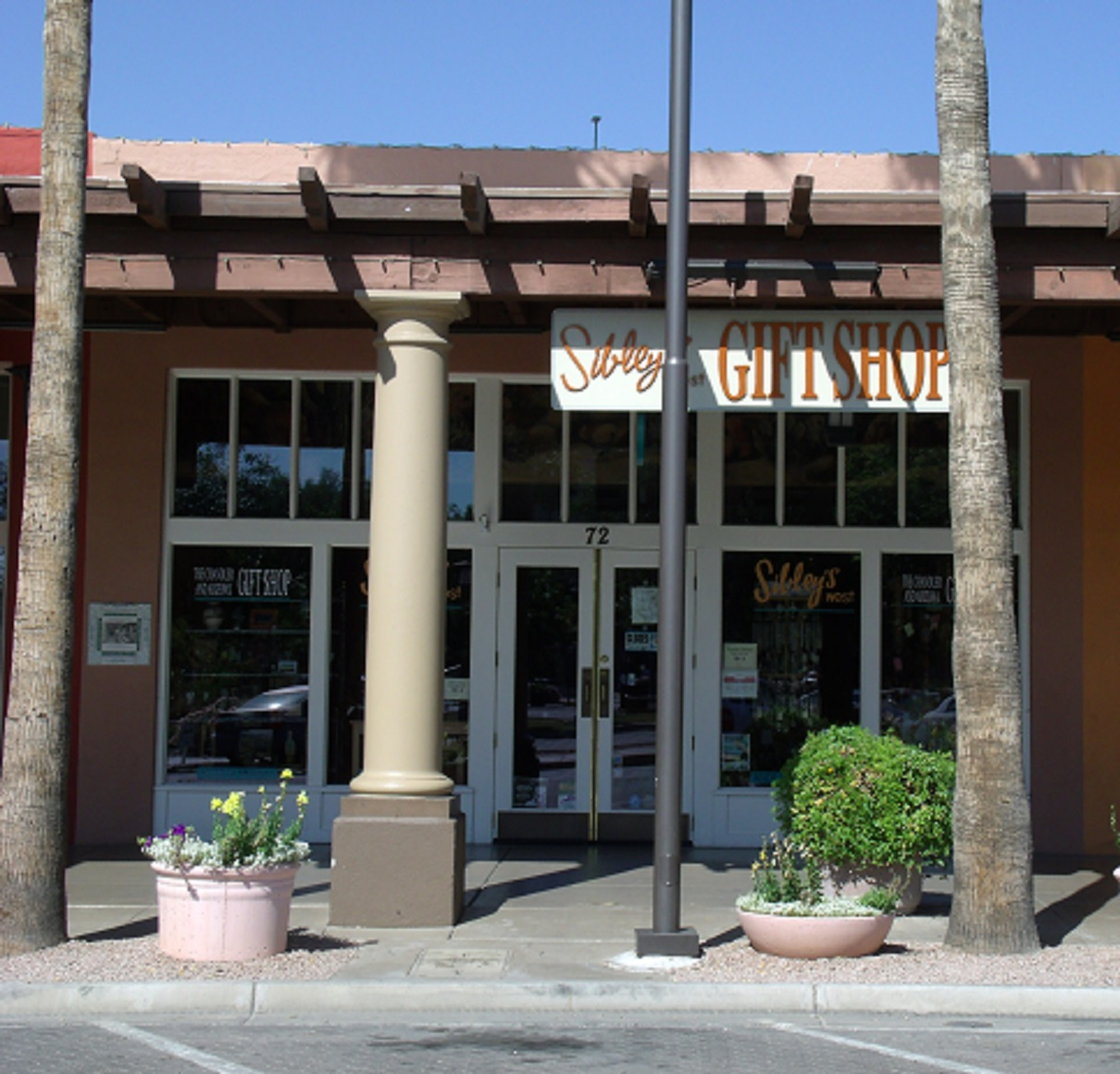
The Andersen Building

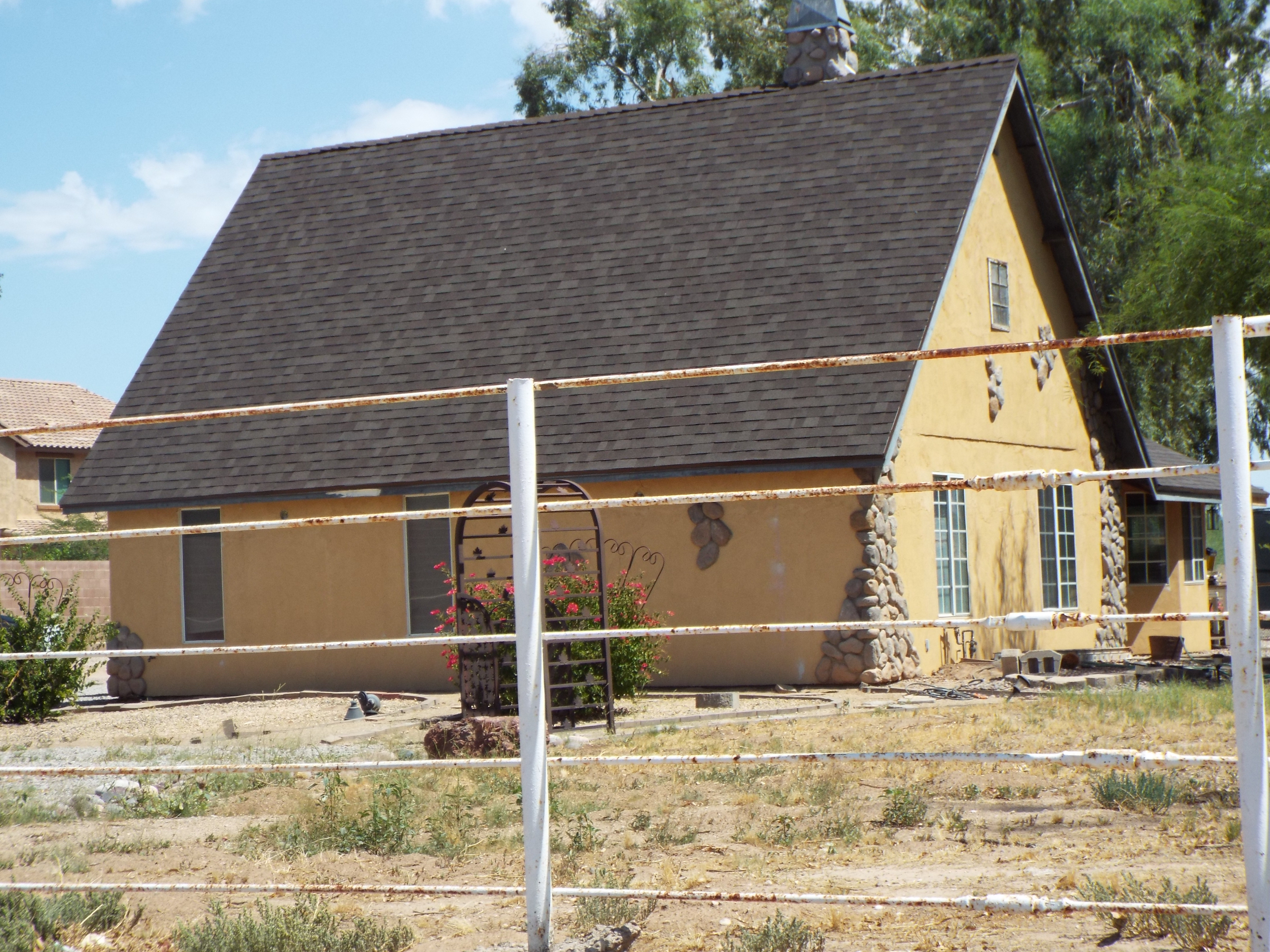
Goodyear Cotton Ranch House

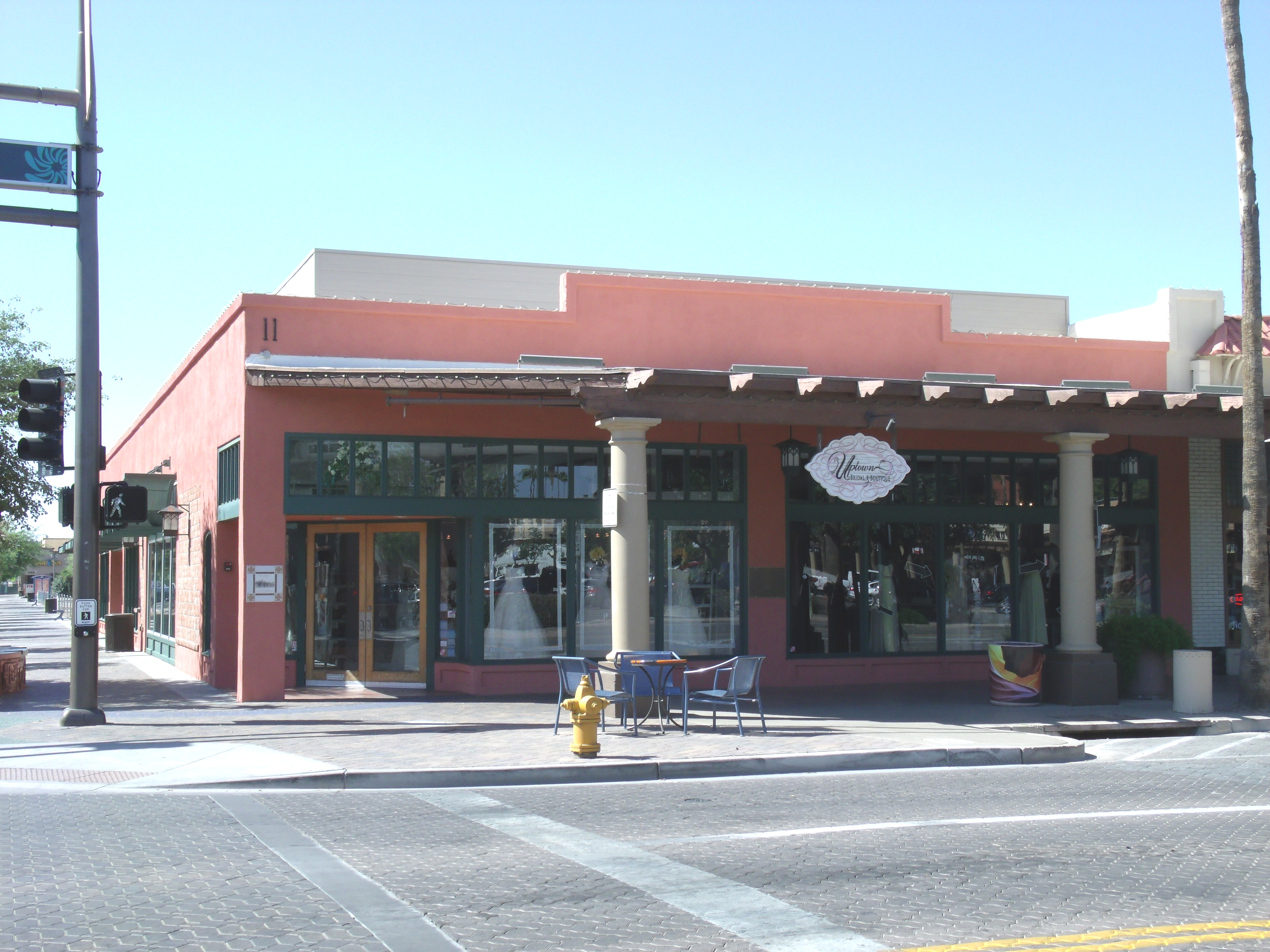
The Arrow Pharmacy

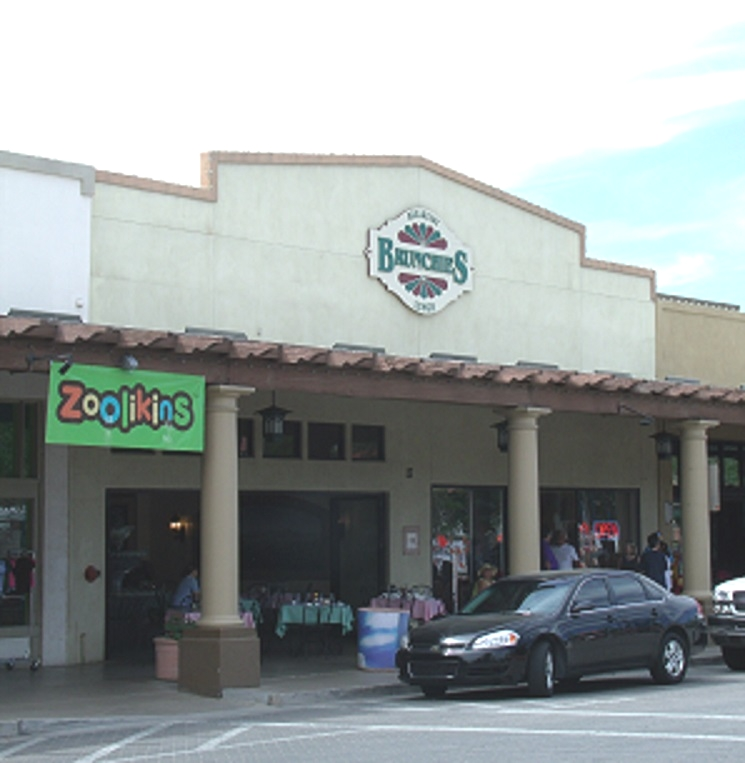
The Reliable Hardware Store Building

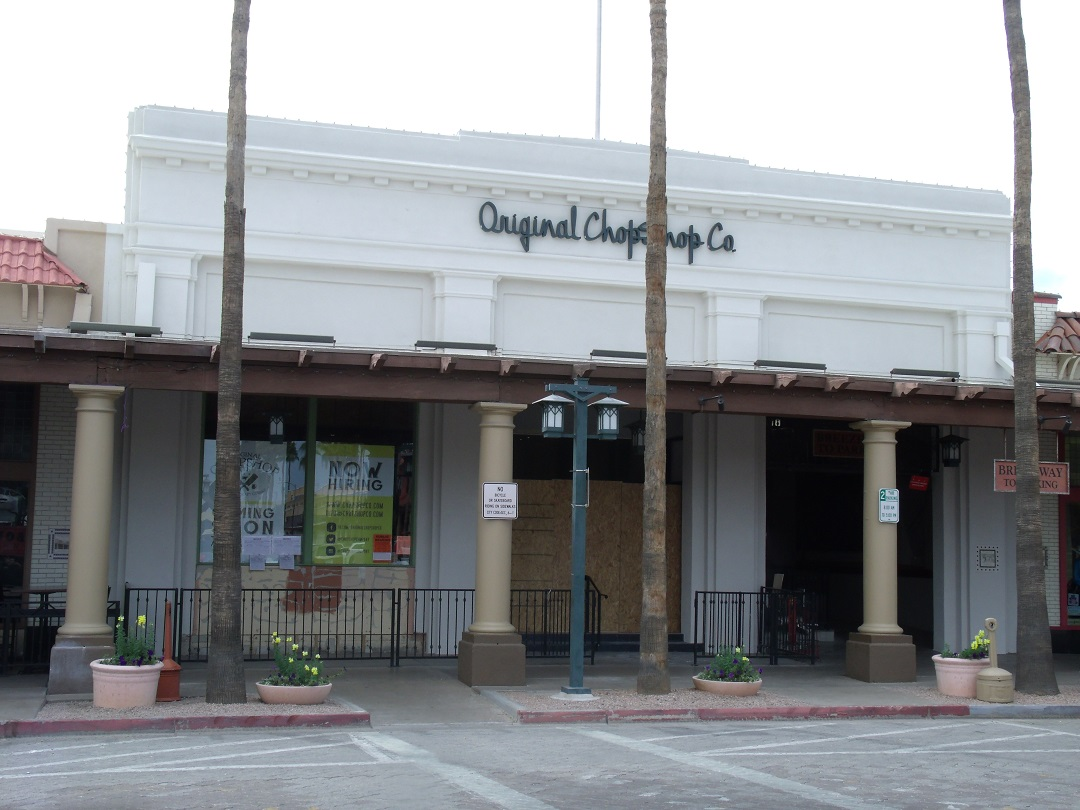
The 1st. National Bank Building

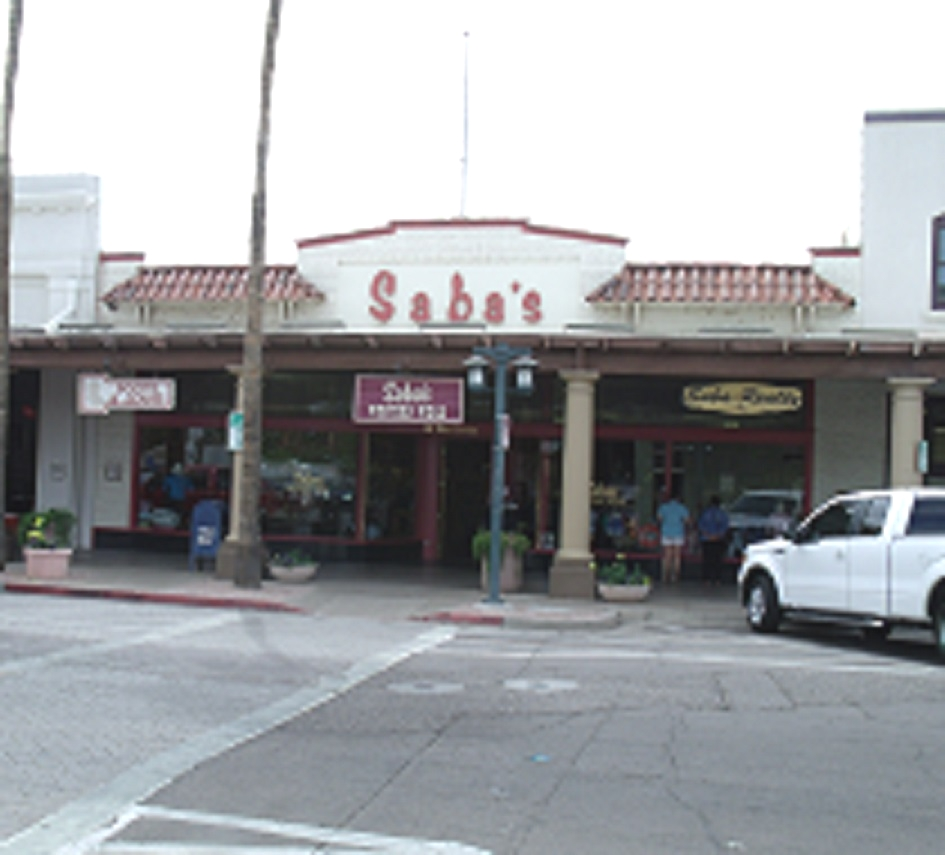
The Friedberg Building

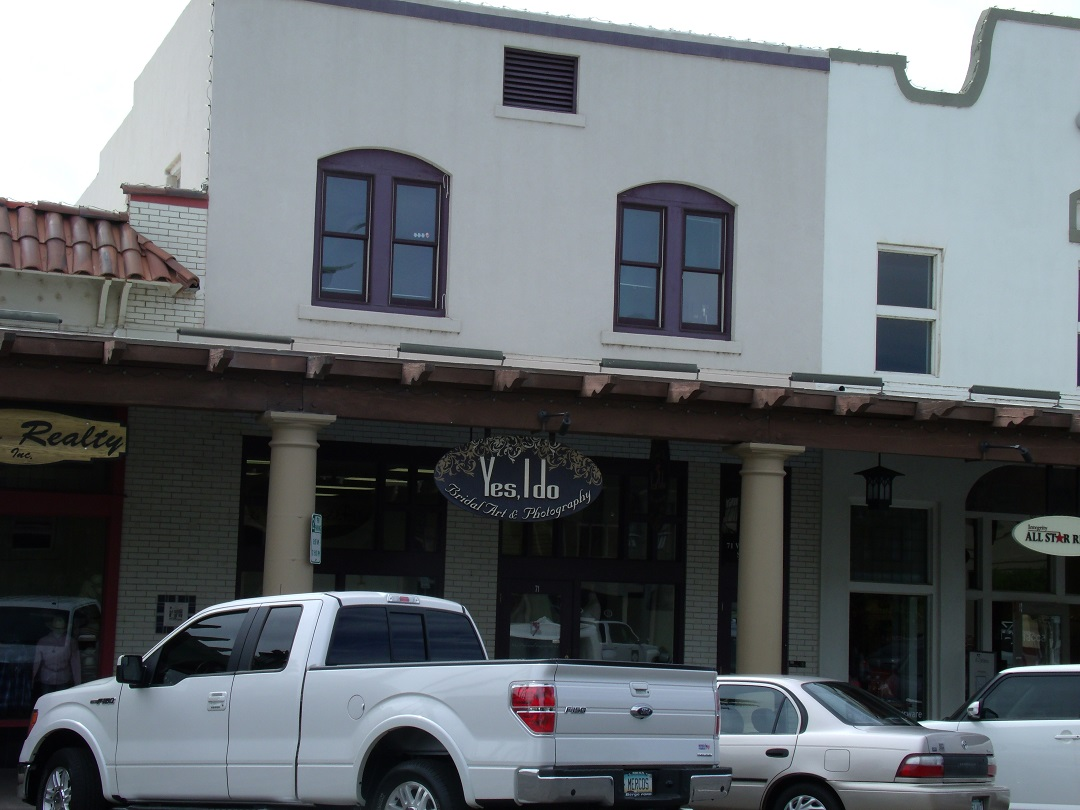
The Gilbert Building

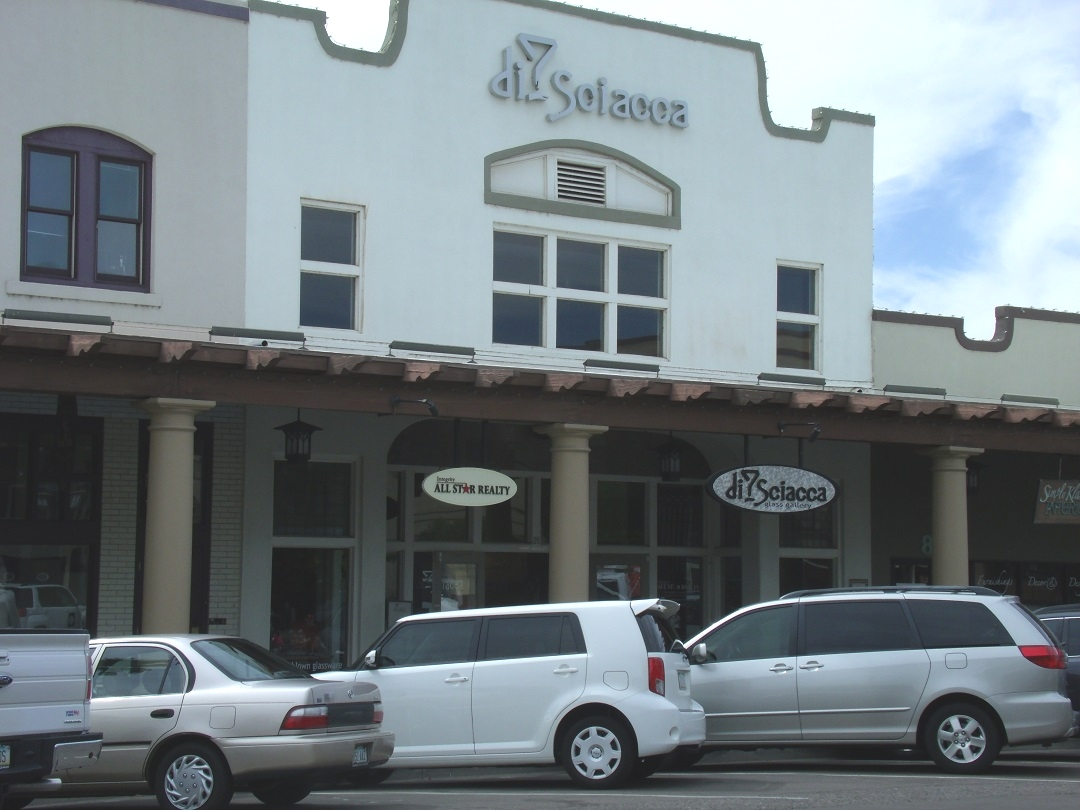
The Menhennet/Rowena Theater Building

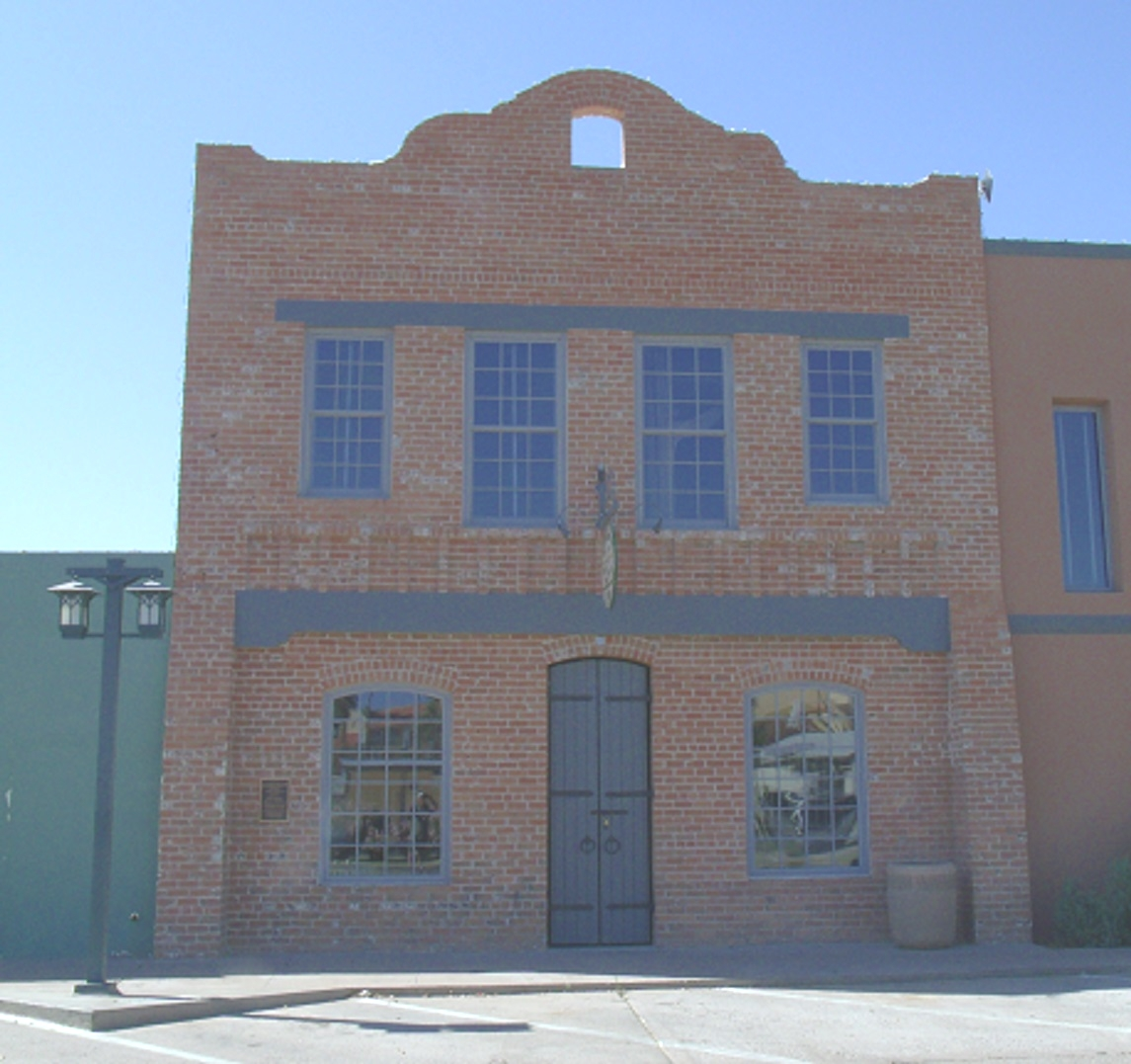
The McCormick Building

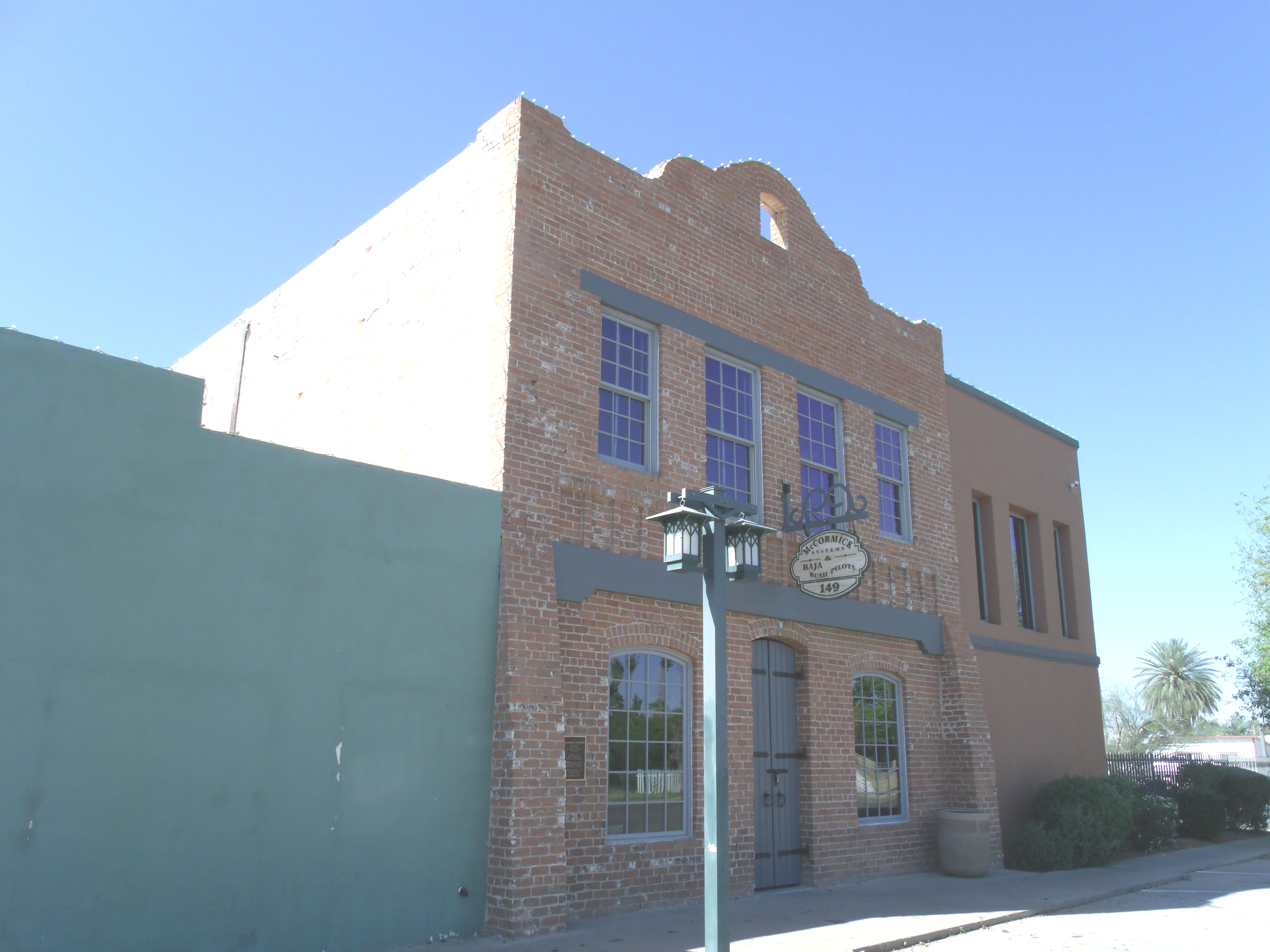
Different view of the McCormick Building

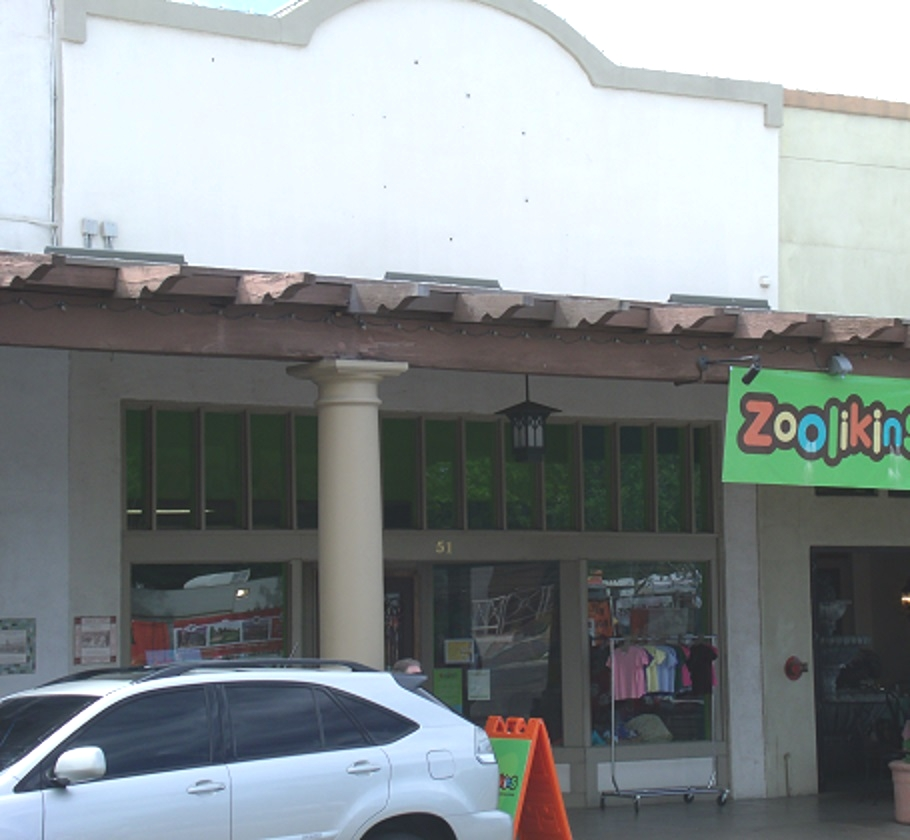
The Esber Store Building

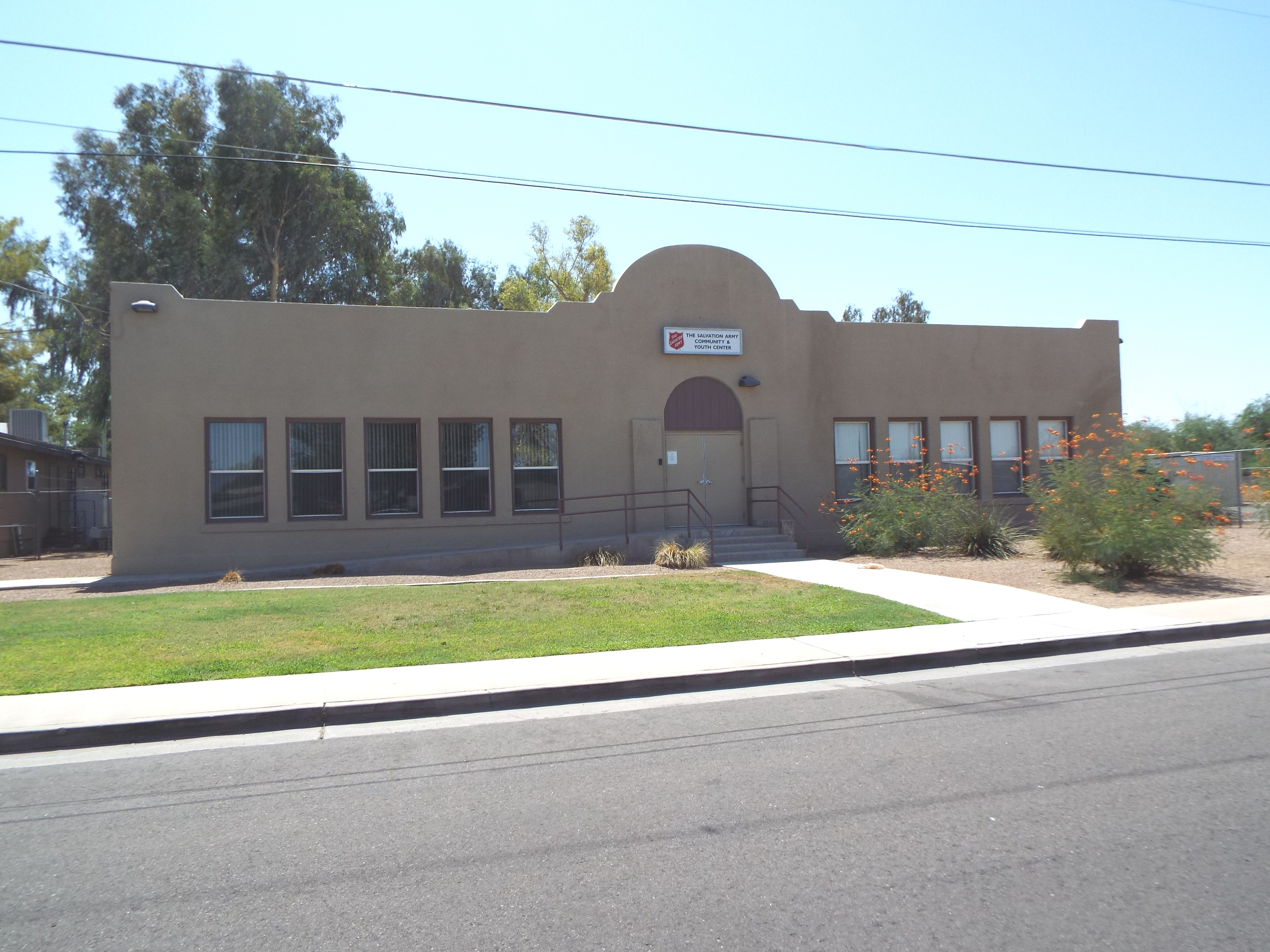
Winn School

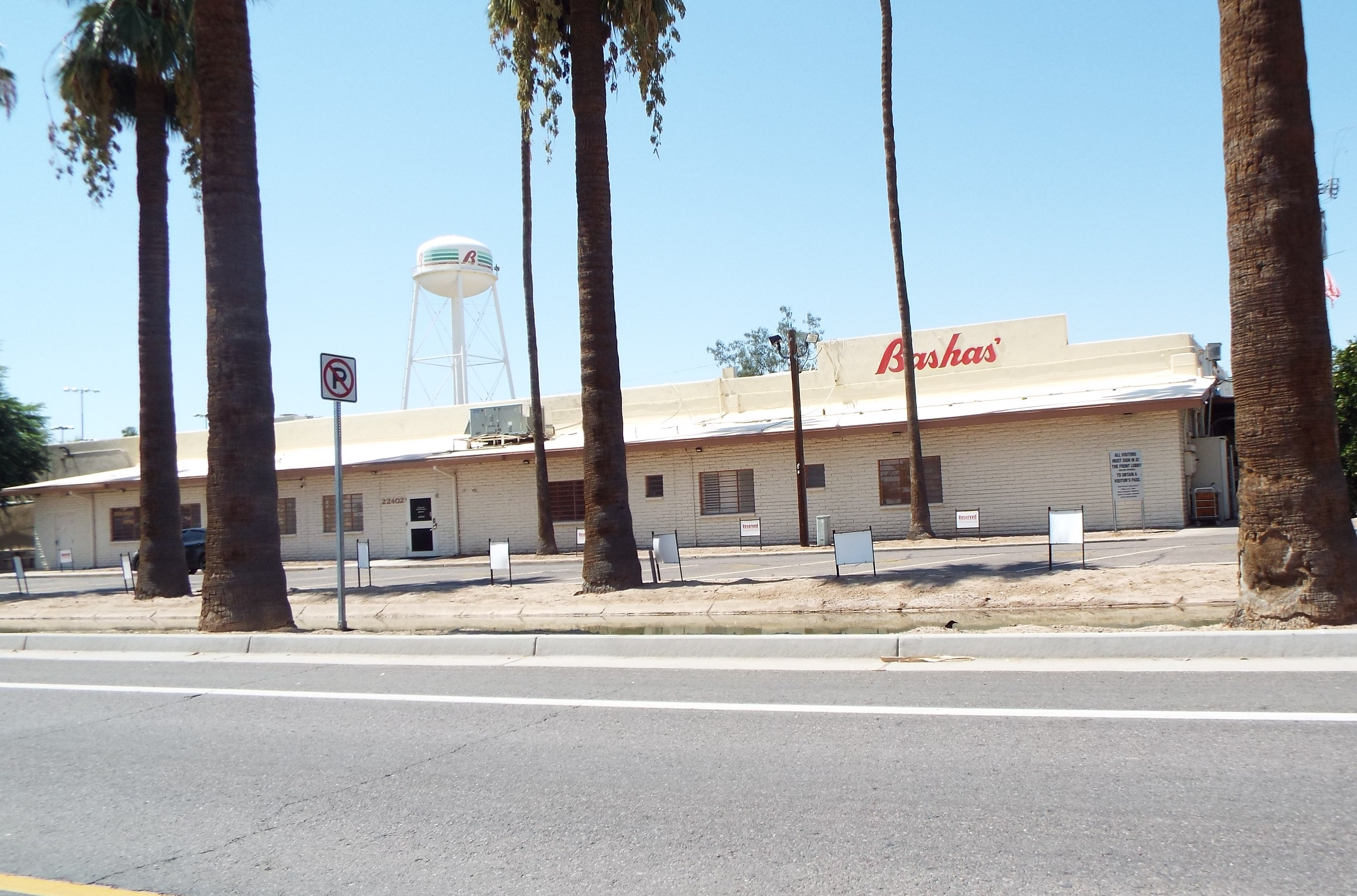
First Basha's Grocery Store

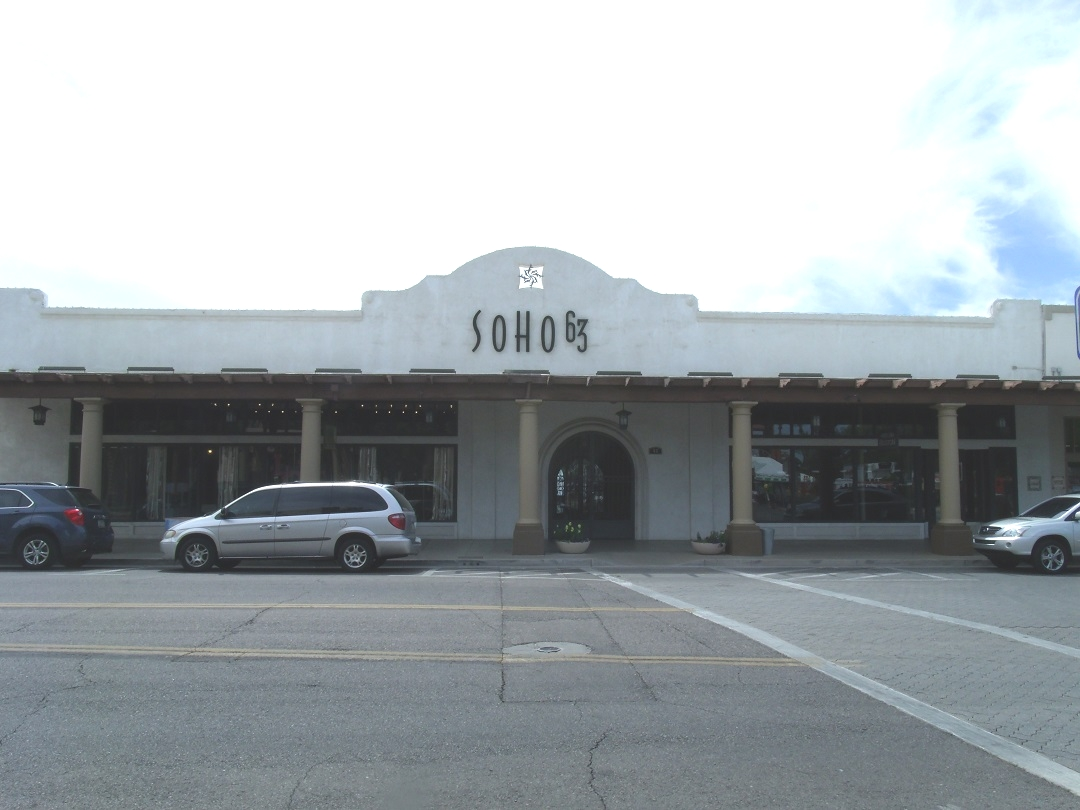
The O.S. Stapley Hardware Store Building

=== Houses and historic cemetery ===
- The Edwards House is the "Maples" model from the 1913 Aladdin Company catalog. The house is located at Tumbleweed Park at 2250 S. McQueen Road. It is listed as historic by the Chandler Historical Society.
- The McCroskey House was built by George Edwards in 1917 and was originally near Pecos and Dobson Roads. The house was sold to the McCroskey family and is located at Tumbleweed Park at 2250 S. McQueen Road. It is listed as historic by the Chandler Historical Society.
- McCullough-Price House built in 1925 and located at 300 S. Chandler Village Dr.. It is list in the National Register of Historic Places, reference #09000311.
- The historic Goodyear-Ocotillo Cemetery was a small plot of land was designated a cemetery by the Goodyear Tire and Rubber Company of Akron, Ohio. Goodyear owned and farmed the surrounding acreage from 1916 until 1943. Goodyear workers and their families are buried here. The Cemetery is located South Iowa Street 0.1 miles south of Fulton Ranch Blvd in Chandler, Az.. The cemetery is listed as historical by the Chandler Historical Society.
Historic houses and the Goodyear-Ocotillo Cemetery in Chandler
(NRHP = National Register of Historic Places)
(CHS=Chandler Historical Society)
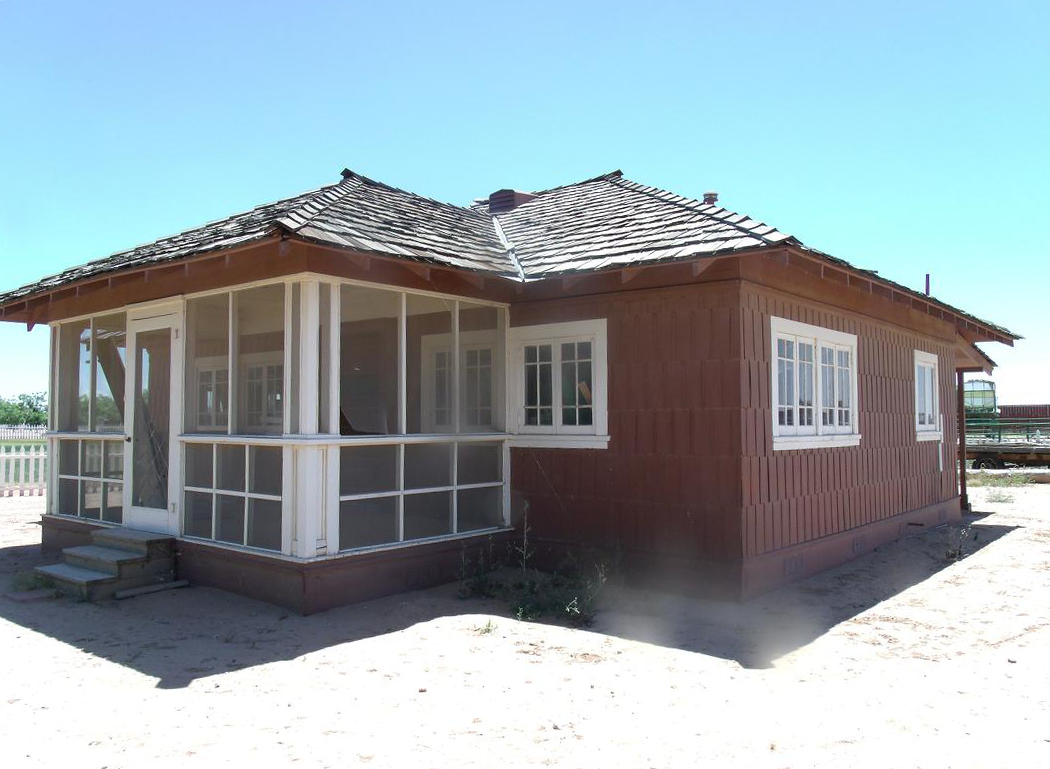
The Edwards House

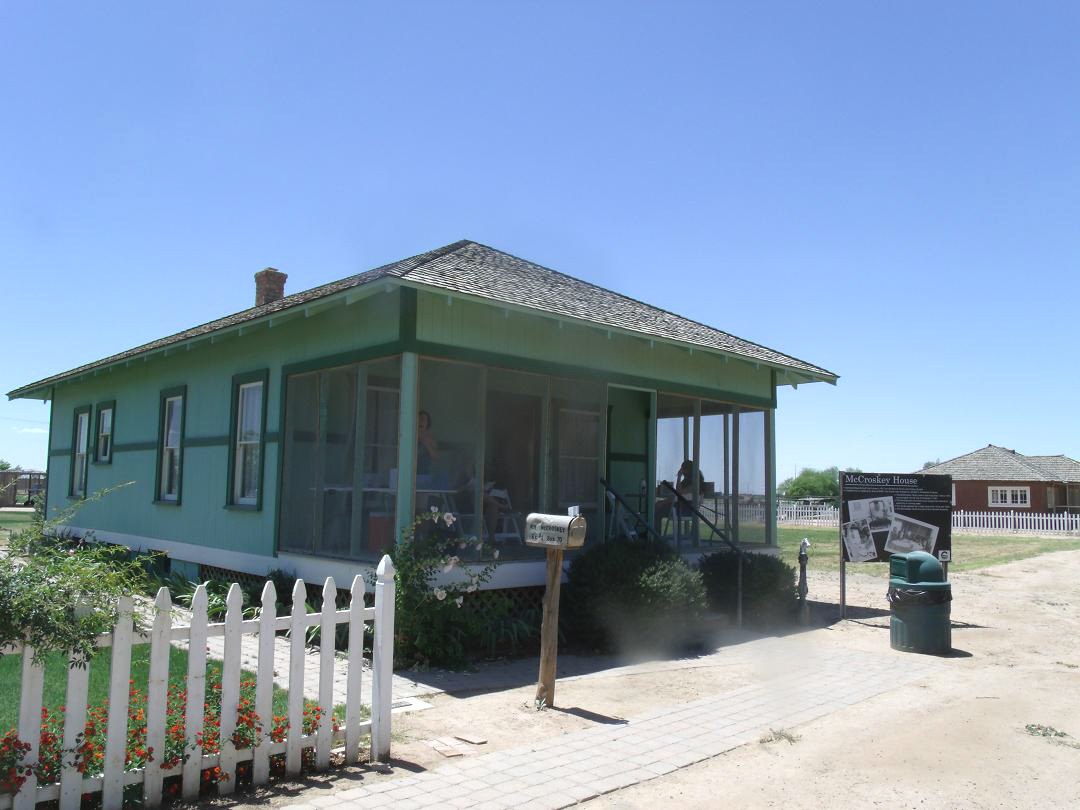
The McCroskey House

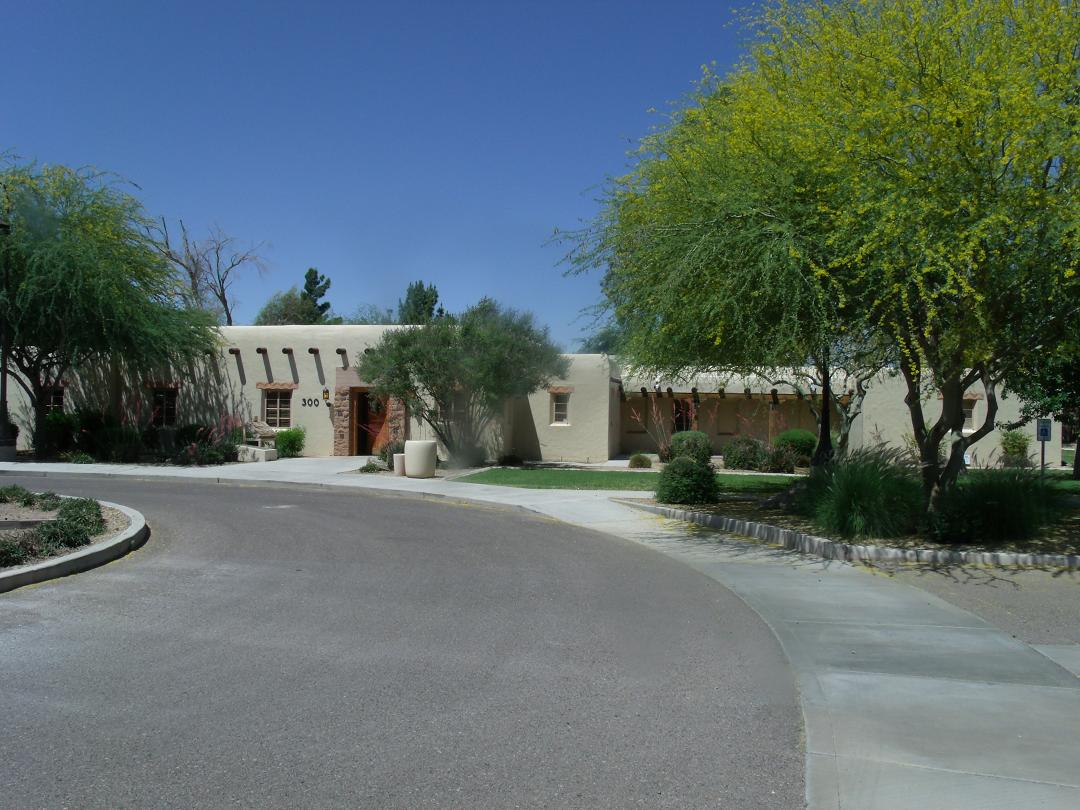
McCullough-Price House

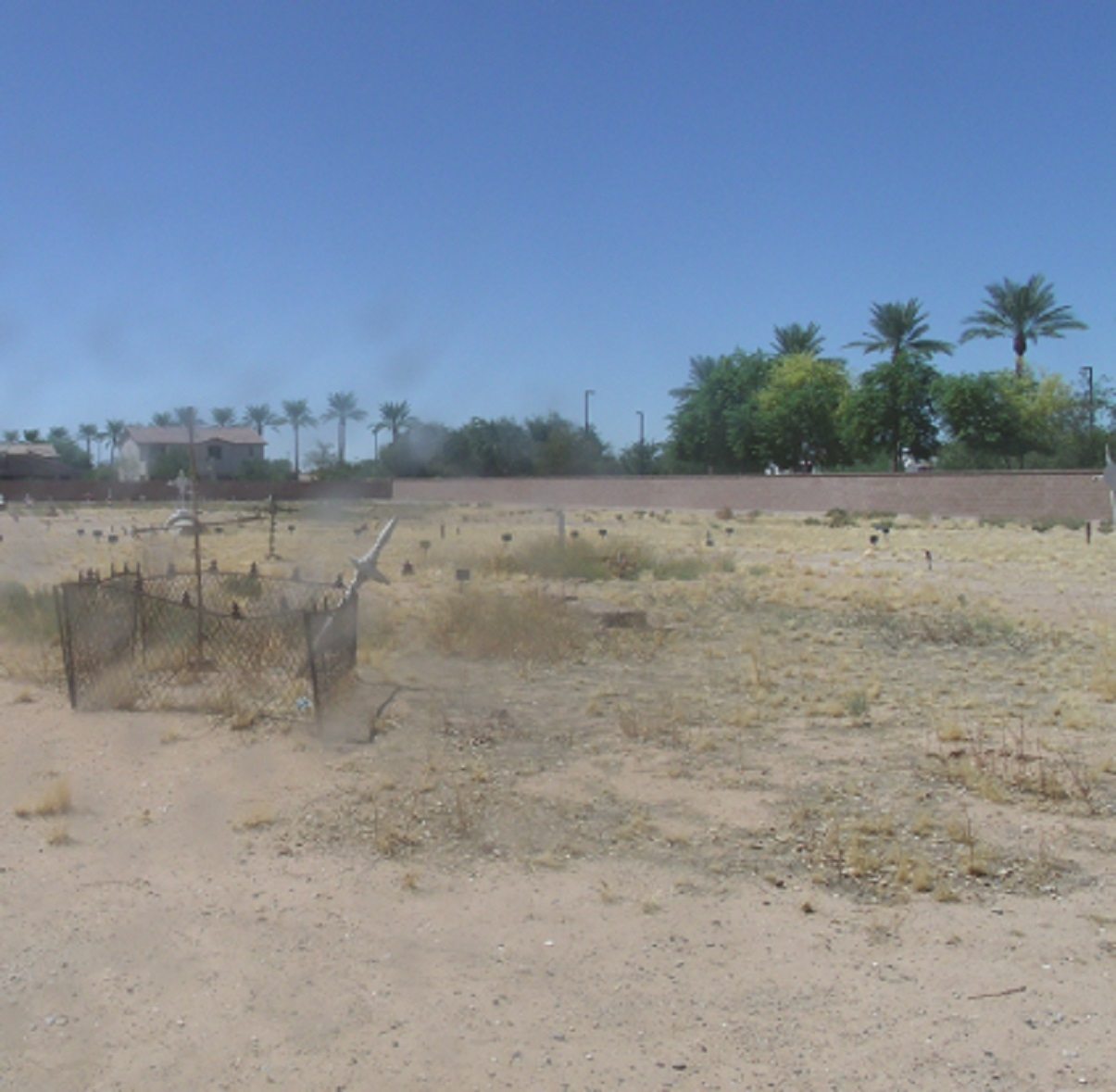
The historic Goodyear-Ocotillo Cemetery

=== Arizona Railway Museum ===
The Arizona Railway Museum was founded and incorporated in 1983 as a non-profit, educational and historical organization. It houses the Southern Pacific Railroad Locomotive No. SP 2562 and Tender No. 8365, the Railroad Steam Wrecking Crane and Tool Car and the Tucson, Cornelia & Gila Bend Caboose No. 15, all of which are listed in the National Register of Historic Places

Pictured are the following:

- The Arizona Railway Museum building and gift shop.
- One of many exhibits inside the Arizona Railway Museum.
- Wheel from Engine Tender #013. The Engine Tender was destroyed in a wreck in 1907 on a bridge over Village Creek between Silsbee and Beaumont, Texas.
- The Southern Pacific Railroad Locomotive No. SP 2562 and Tender No. 8365 was built in 1900. It is on exhibit in the Arizona Railway Museum. The locomotive is a Model: BLW 2–8–0, built as: SP 2562 (2-8-0) by the Baldwin Locomotive Works, Serial Number: 29064. The locomotive and tender are listed in the National Register of Historic Places. Reference #09000511.
- Inside the Southern Pacific Railroad Locomotive Sp 2562 which is listed in the National Register of Historic Places. Reference #09000511.
- The Magma Railroad Baldwin #10. The Baldwin Locomotive Works built this locomotive in 1950 as a DRS 6–6–1500, diesel for the McCloud River Railroad as #29.
- The C&NW E8 locomotive operated by the Chicago and North Western Transportation Company and built in 1950.
- The Southern Railway Business Car built in 1897 for the Southern Railway Company. The car, nicknamed the "Desert Valley", served as the President's Car on the South Carolina & Georgia Railroad in 1901.
- The Federal #98 Pullman Private Car. This Pullman Private Car, which was available for lease, was built by the Pullman Company in 1911.
- The Santa Fe Business Car #405, also known as the Superintendent's Car, was one of eighteen cars built in 1927 by the Pullman Company as part of the fourth order of business cars for division superintendents.
- The Santa Fe Coach "Diablo Canyon" #3079 was built by the Budd Company in 1937.
- The Santa Fe Coach built in 1910.
- The Santa Fe-Plaza Taos "Dome" Car built in 1950.
- Inside view of the Santa Fe-Plaza Taos "Dome" built in 1950.
- Inside view of the Santa Fe-Plaza Taos Dome Car "Lounge Room" which was built in 1950.
- Stairs leading to the "Dome" of the Santa Fe-Plaza Taos which was built in 1950.
- The Union Pacific Diner Car built in 1949 by the A C & F Railroad CO. and operated by the Union Pacific Railroad.
- The Tucson, Cornelia & Gila Bend Caboose No. 15. It was built in the late 1890s, when the Phelps-Dodge Copper Company sought to connect their New Cornelia Copper Mine in Ajo (pronounced "AY-ho") with smelters in Tucson. It was listed in the NRHP on May 7, 2018, reference# 100001660.
- The Railroad Steam Wrecking Crane and Tool Car. It is also known as Southern Pacific Railroad Nos.: SPMW 7130/SPMW 7131 was built in 1900 by the Bay City Industrial Works. The wrecking crane and tool car are listed in the National Register of Historic Places. Reference #07001301.
- The Tank Car UTLX #7682 (PDAX #1057). This single Dome Tank Car was built by the Union Tank Car Company for Southern Pacific in 1942. It has a riveted tank body.
- The G.R.Y.X. 799 tank car is a three dome, three compartment, outside riveted tank car which was built for the W. R. Grace Company in 1938. The three separate compartments were used to carry chemicals or solvents.
- The Log Car built in 1917 by Bettendorf Co. for the Southwest Forest Industry.
- The Refrigerator Car built in 1920 by American Car & Foundry for the Santa Fe Railroad Co.
- The Southern Pacific Horse Car built in 1937 by the St. Louis Car Company for the Southern Pacific Transportation Company.
- The Toronto Transit Street Car built in 1930.
Arizona Railway Museum

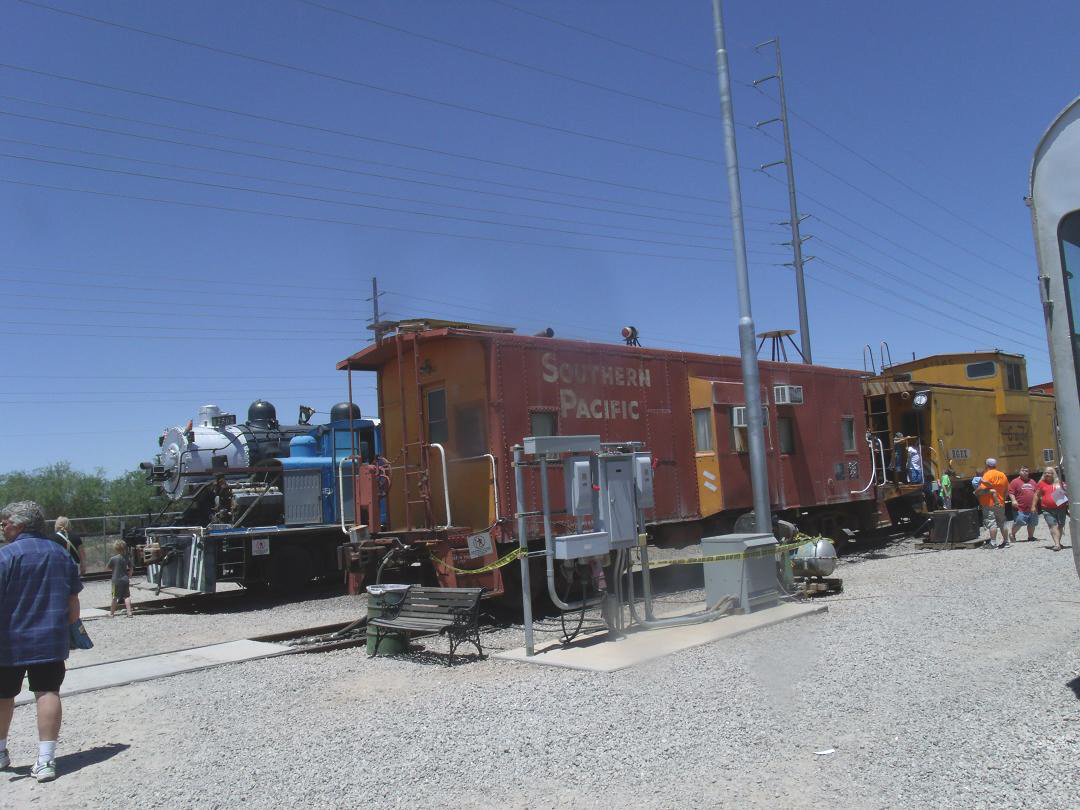
The Arizona Railway Museum

(NRHP = National Register of Historic Places)
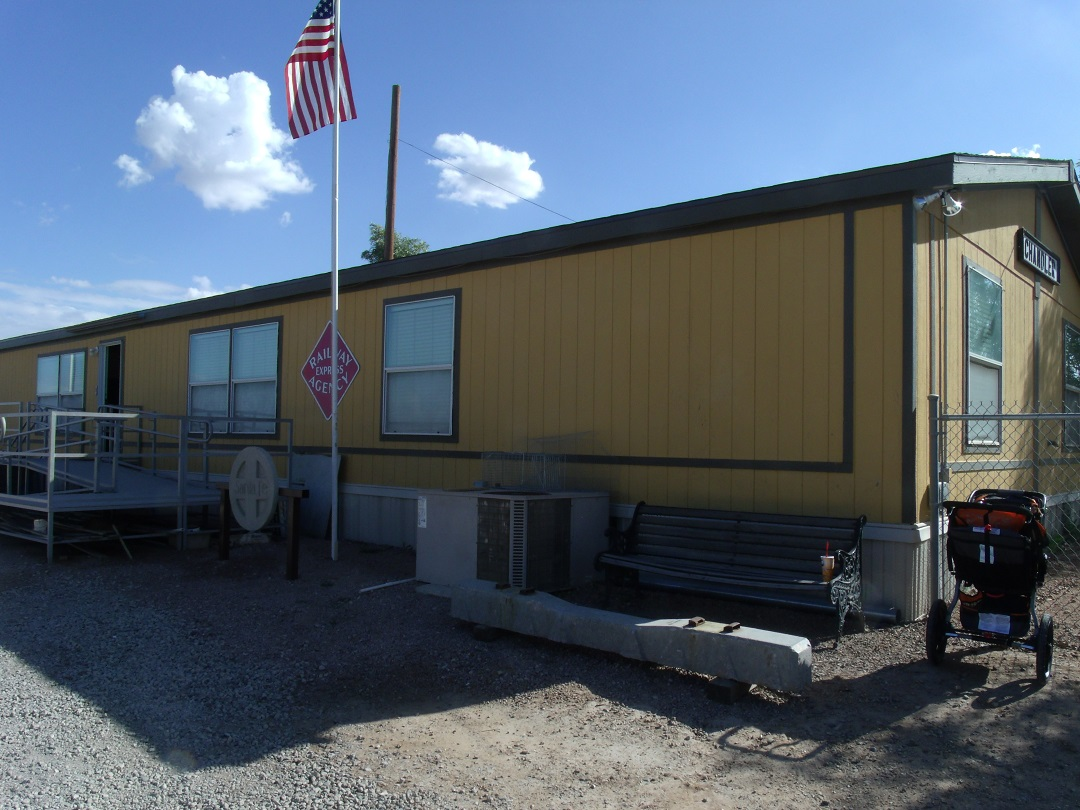
The Arizona Railway Museum

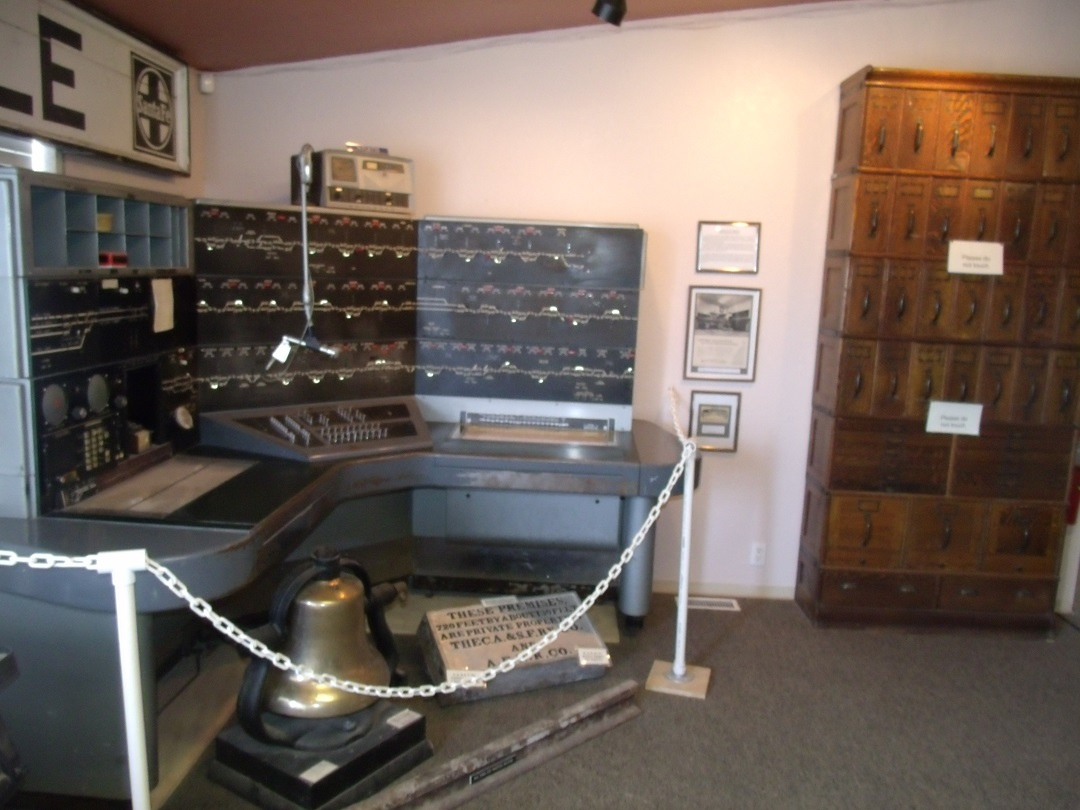
One of many exhibits inside the Arizona Railway Museum.

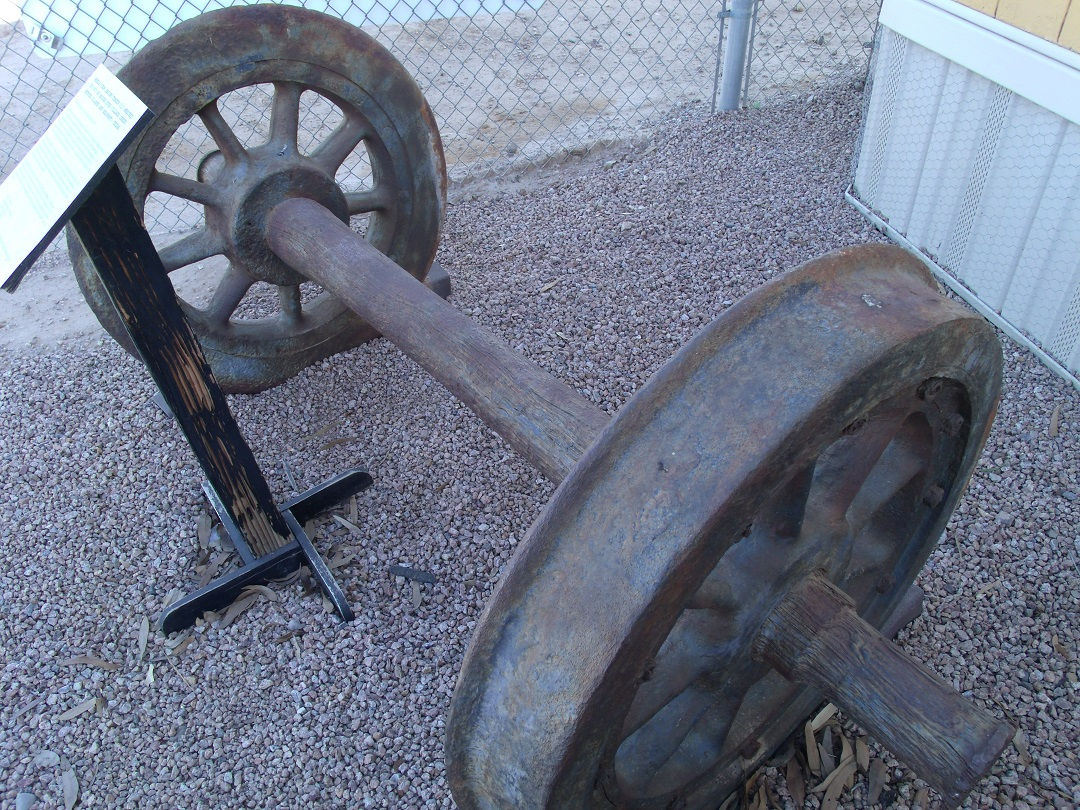
Wheel from Engine Tender #013.

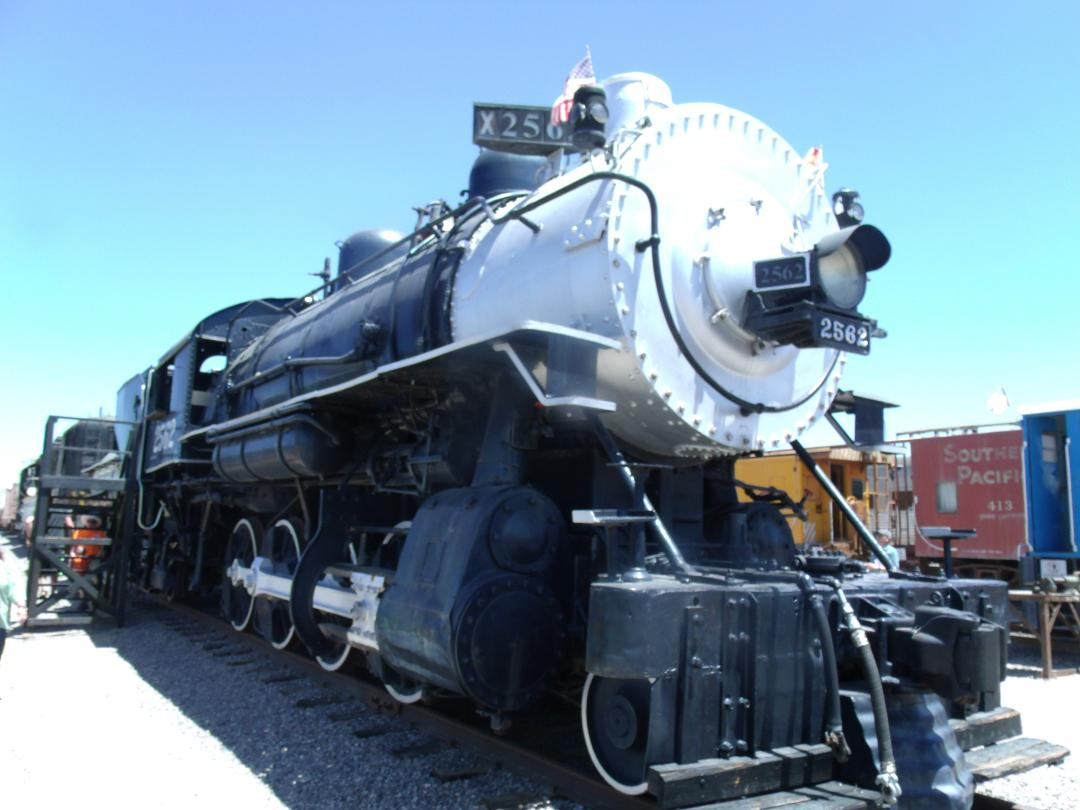
Southern Pacific Railroad Locomotive No. SP 2562 and Tender No. 8365

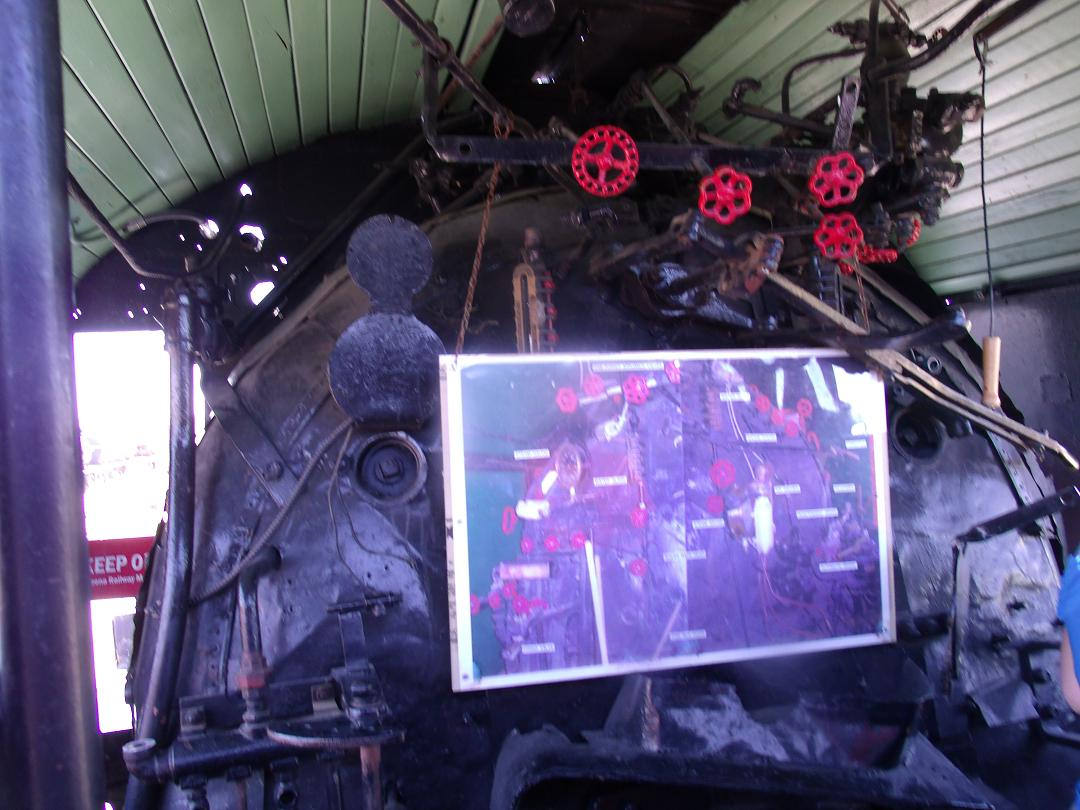
Inside the Southern Pacific Railroad Locomotive Sp 2562

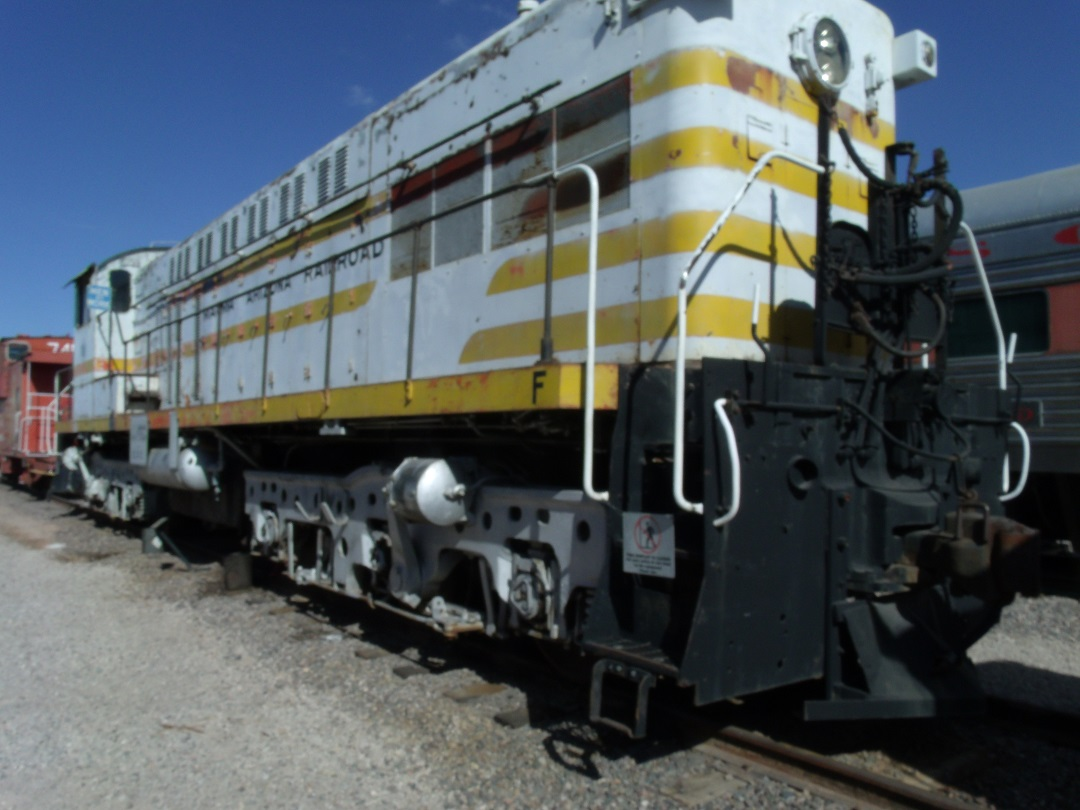
Magma Railroad Baldwin #10.

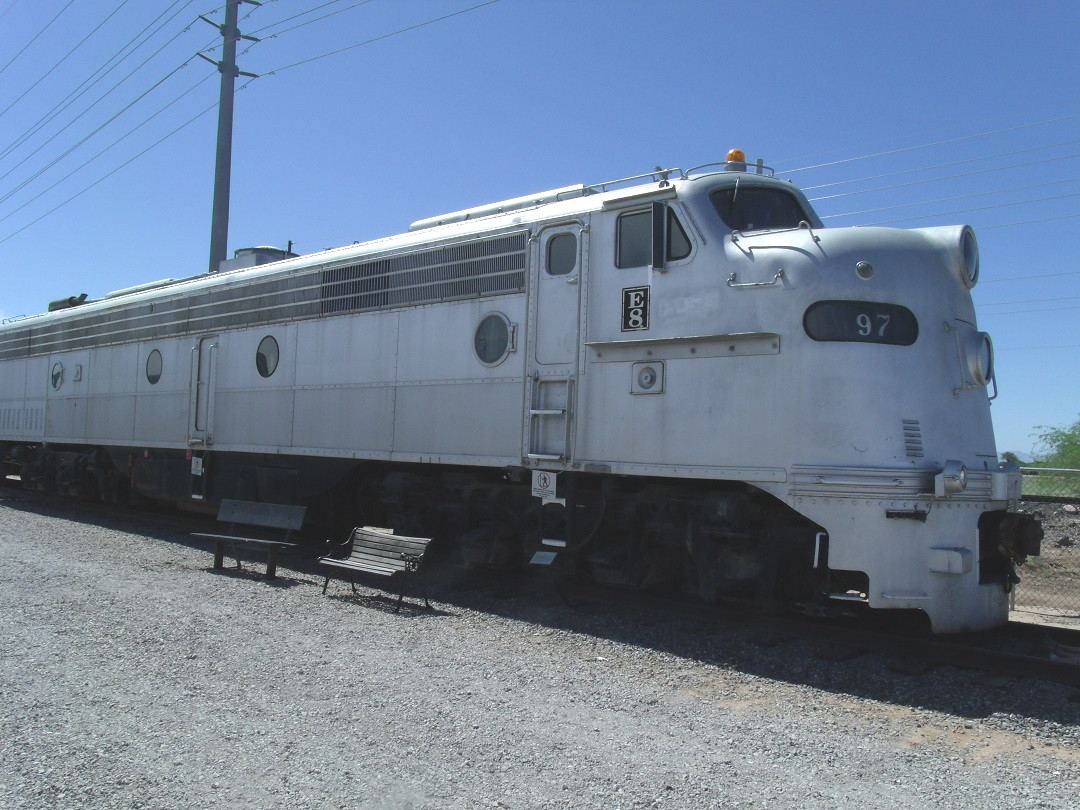
C&NW E8 locomotive

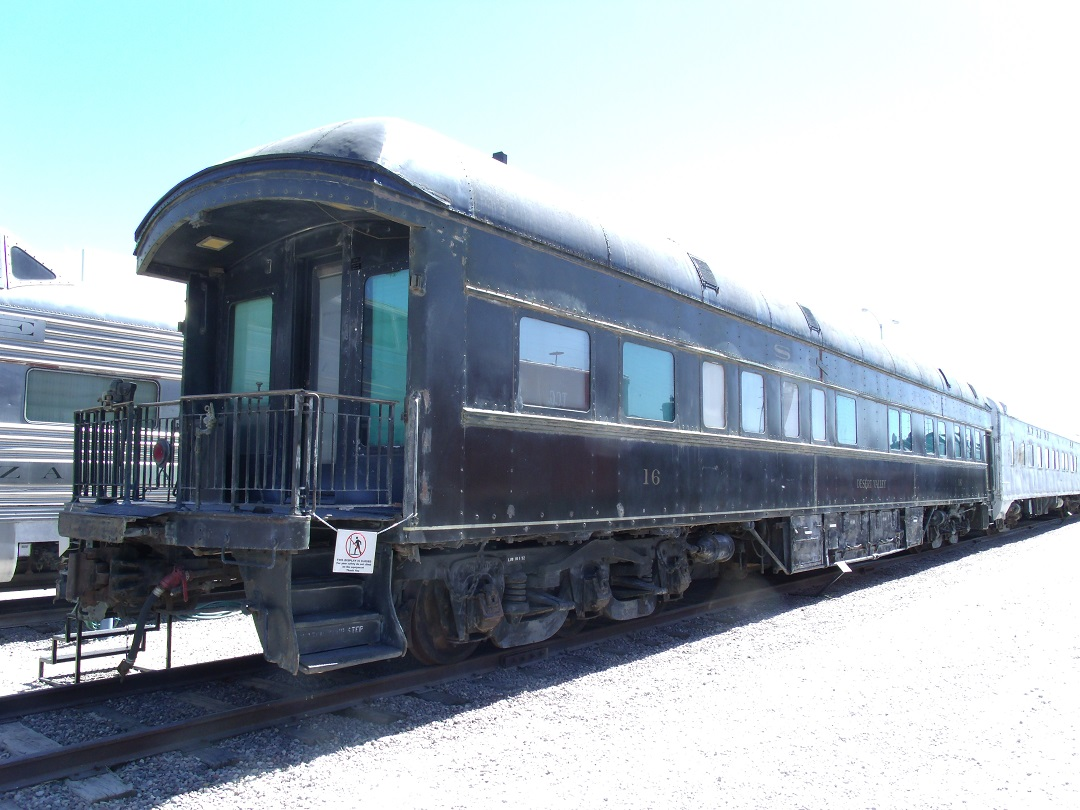
Southern Railway Business Car

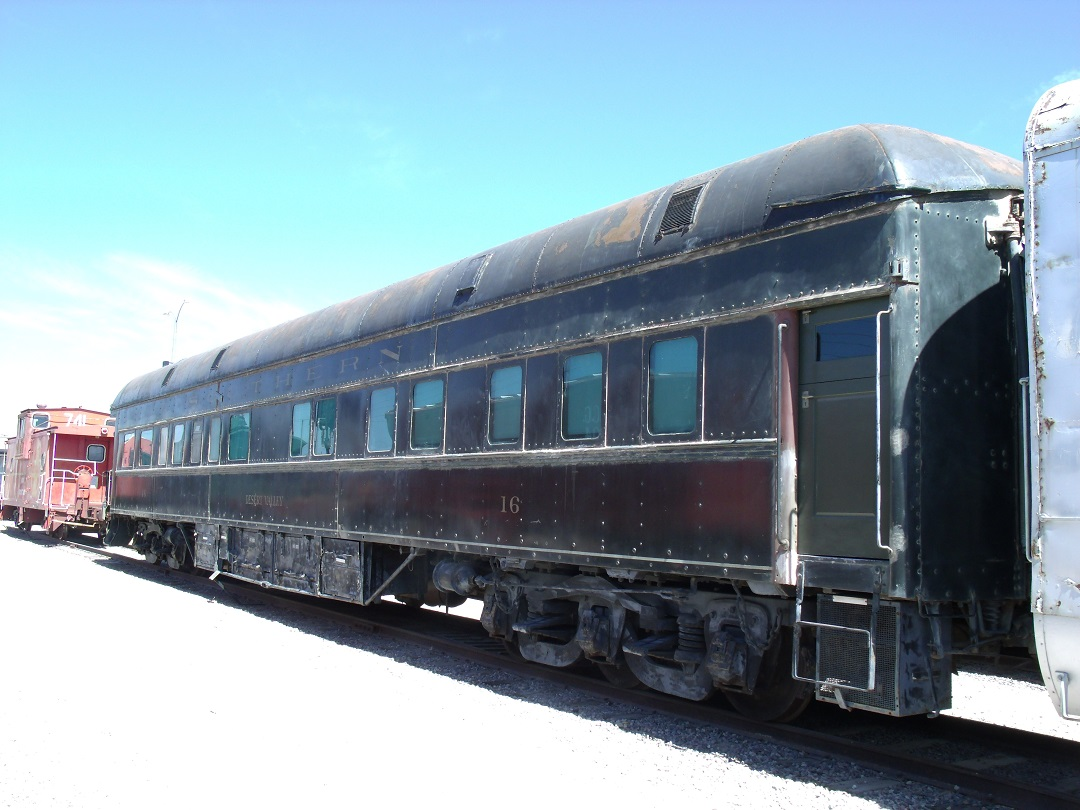
Different view of the Southern Railway Business Car built in 1897.

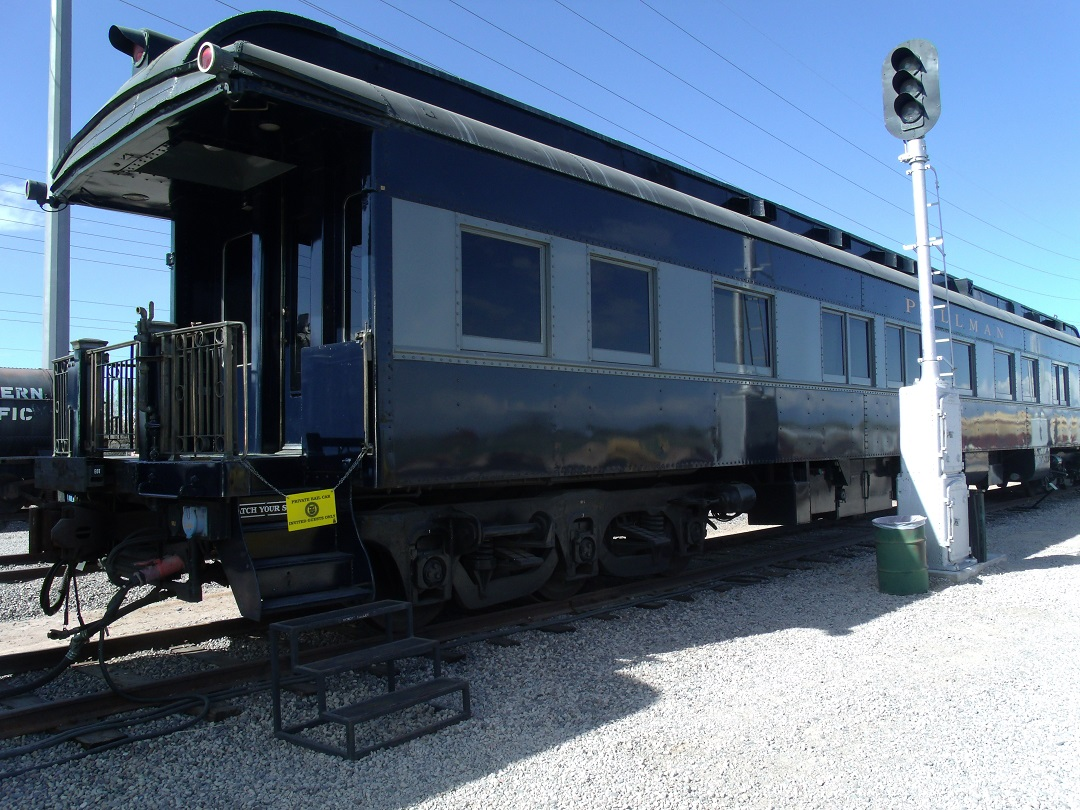
The Federal #98 Pullman Private Car.

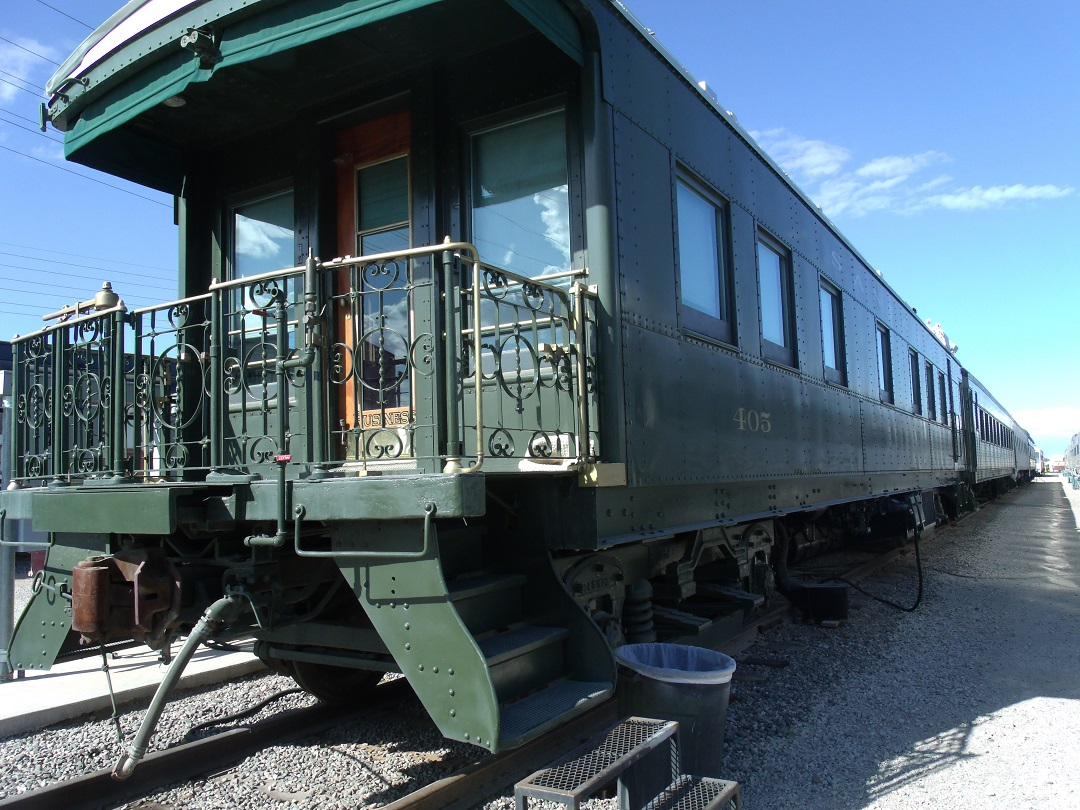
The Santa Fe Business Car #405, also known as the Superintendent's Car.

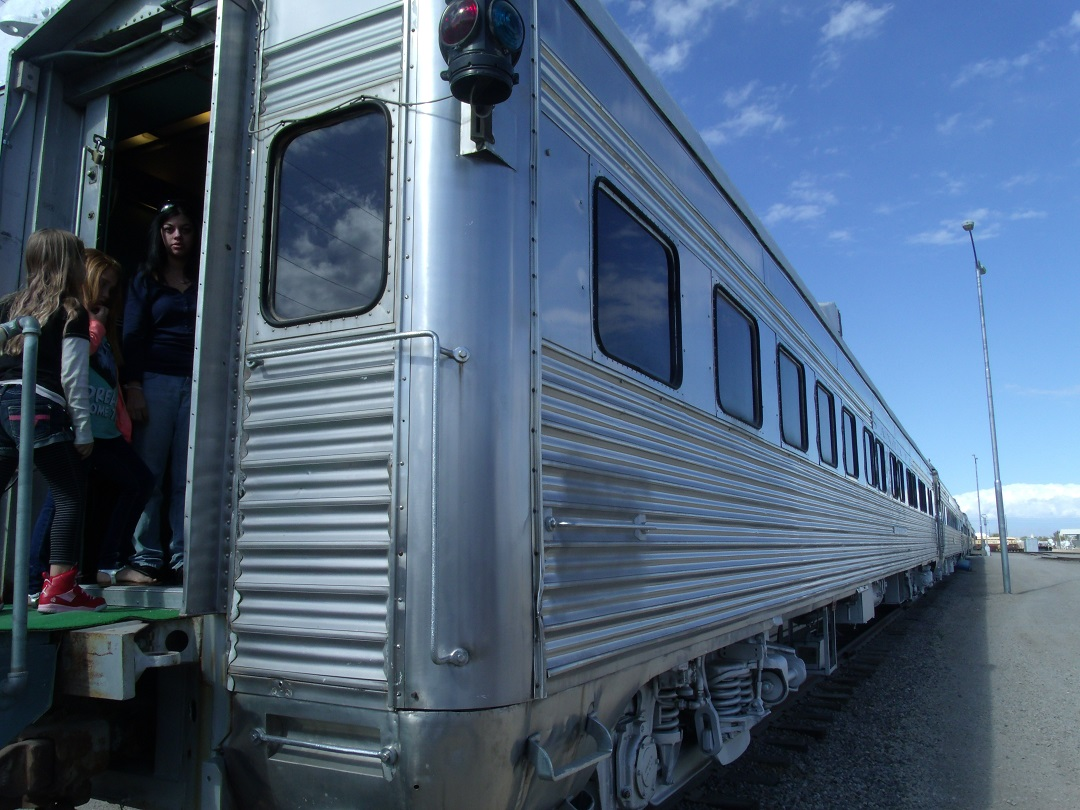
The Santa Fe Coach "Diablo Canyon" #3079.

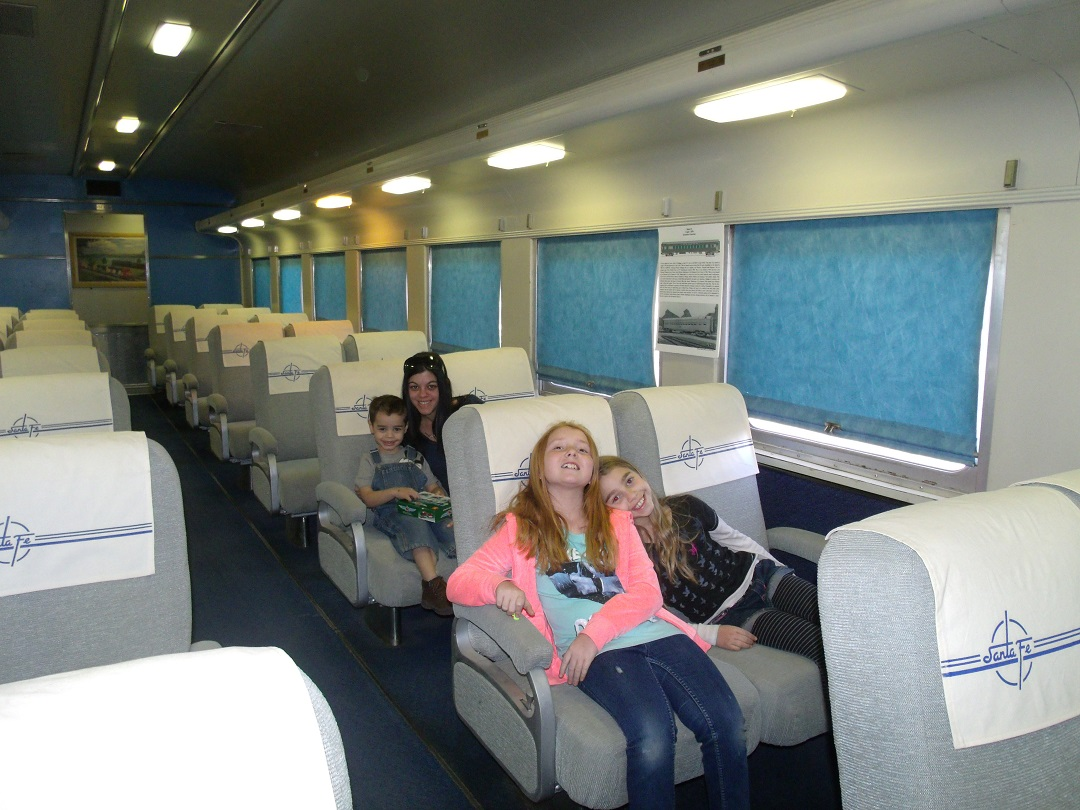
Visitors posing inside the Santa Fe Coach "Diablo Canyon" #3079.

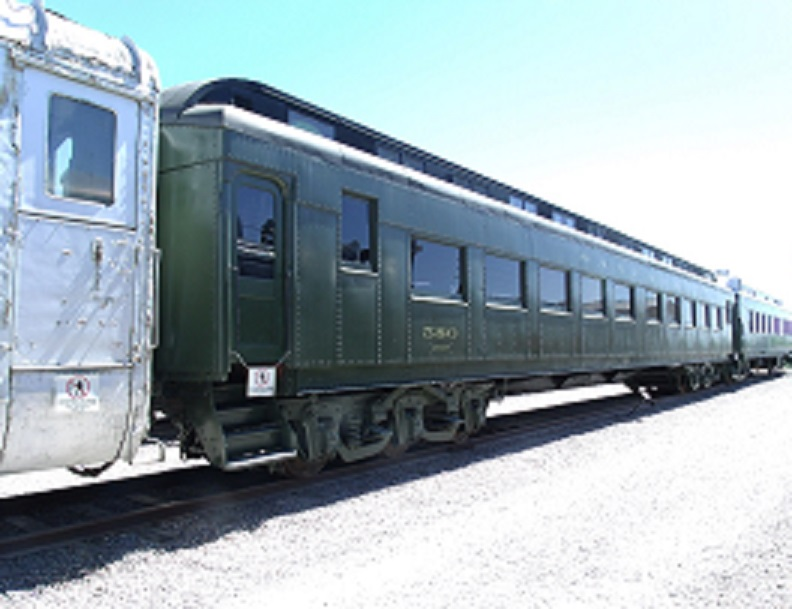
Santa Fe Coach .

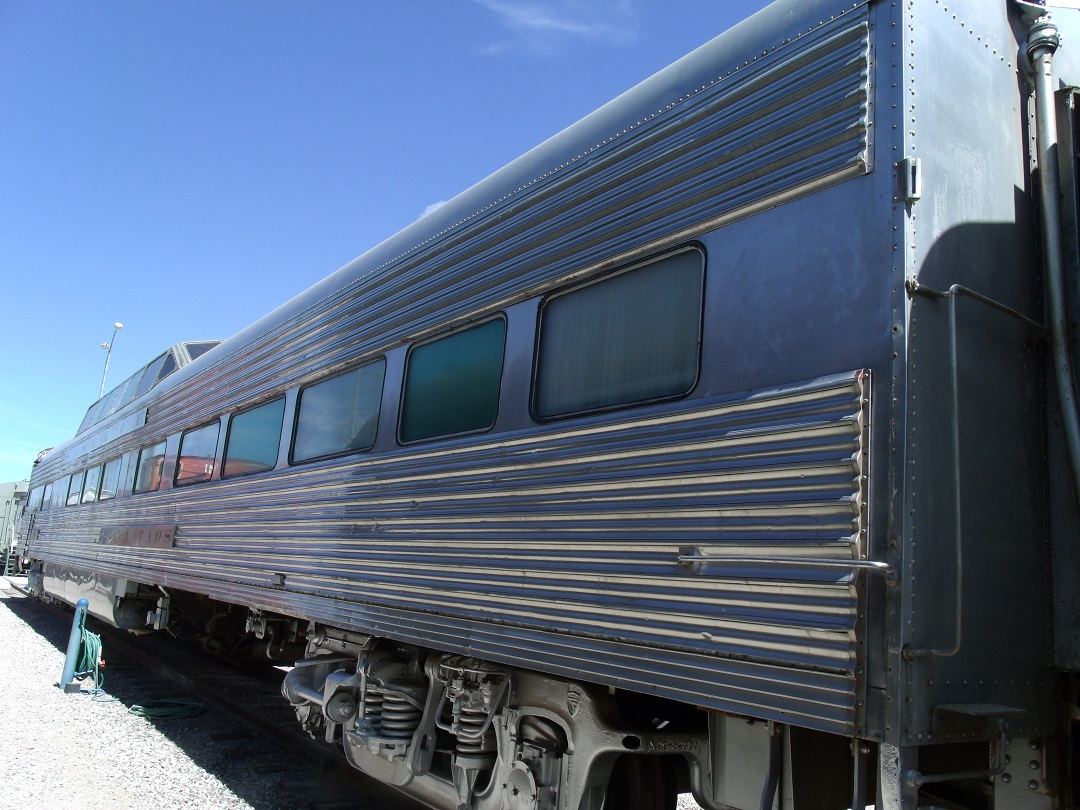
Santa Fe-Plaza Taos "Dome" Car.

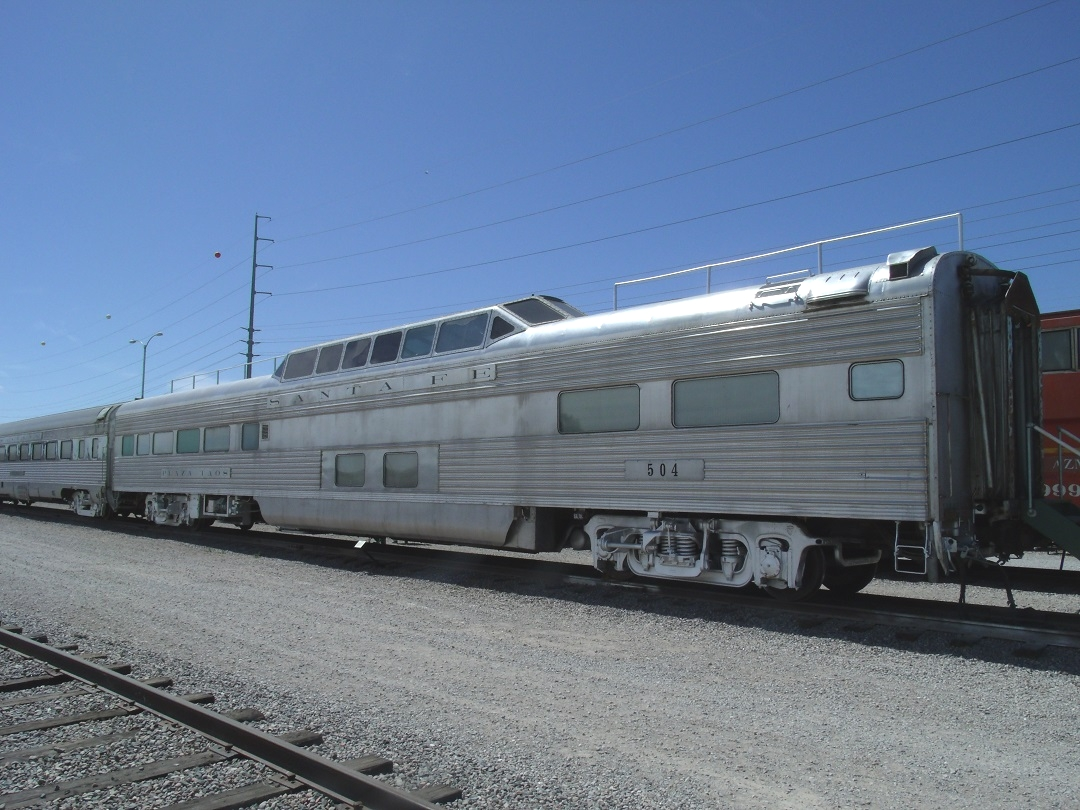
Different view of the Santa Fe-Plaza Taos "Dome" Car.

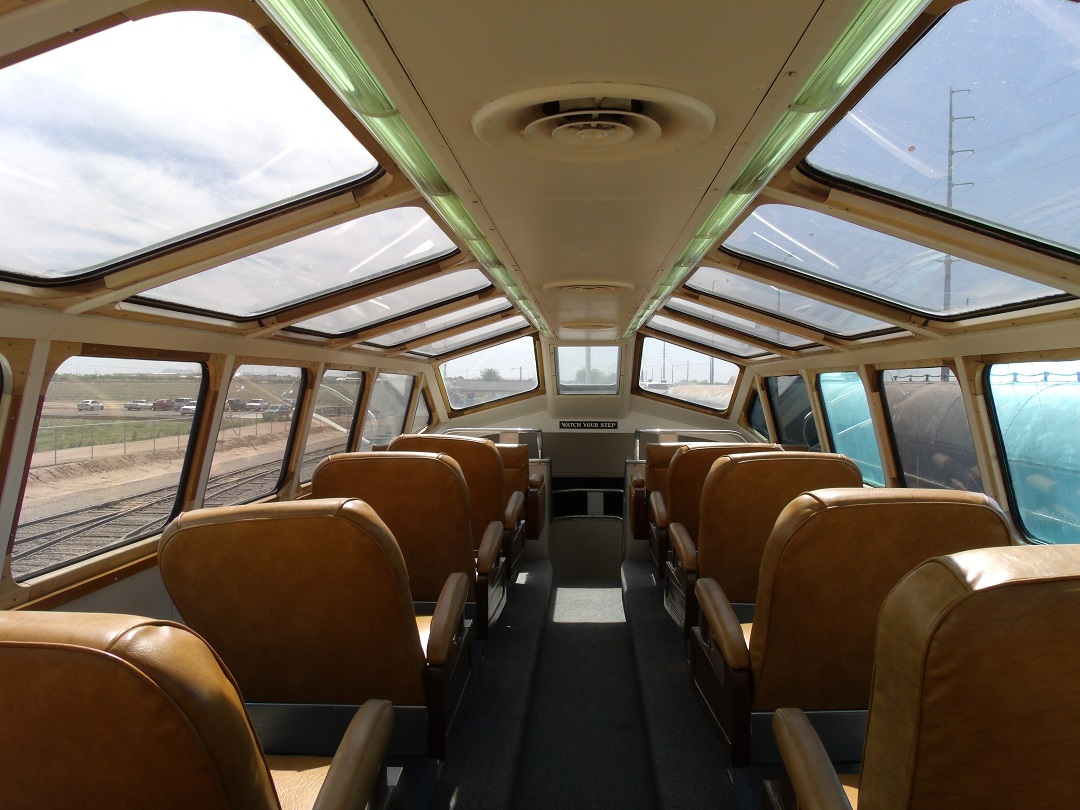
Inside view of the Santa Fe-Plaza Taos "Dome".

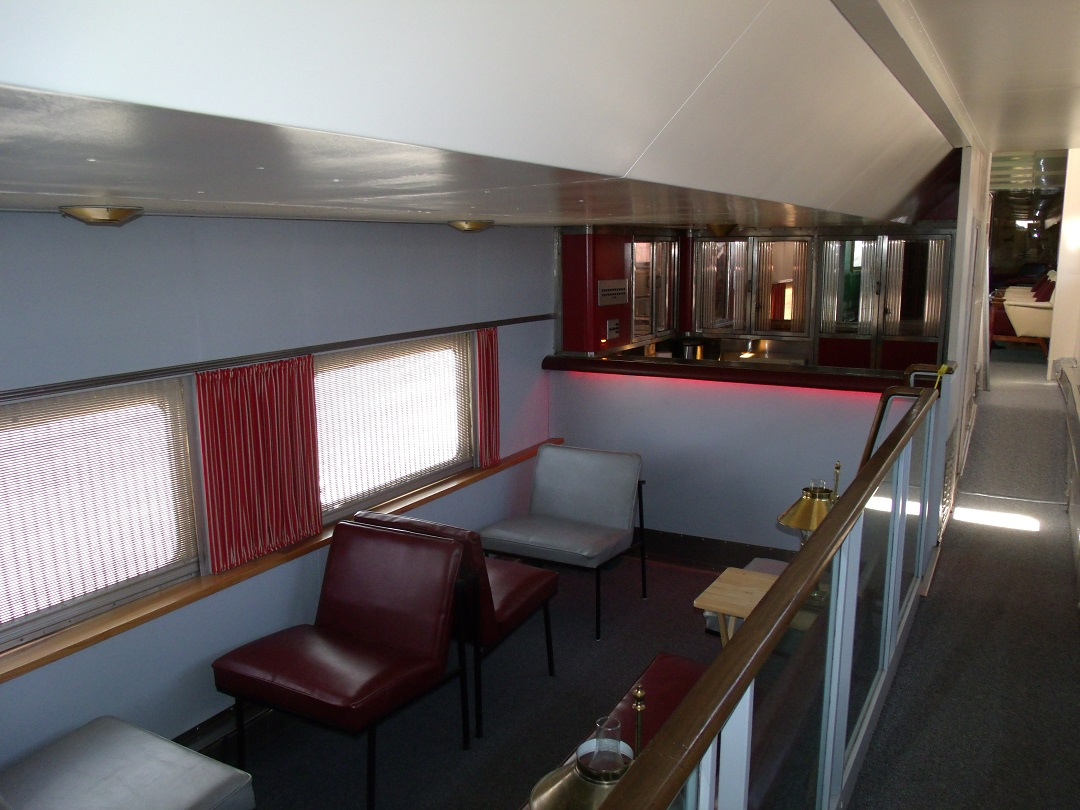
Inside view of the Santa Fe-Plaza Taos Dome Car "Lounge Room" .

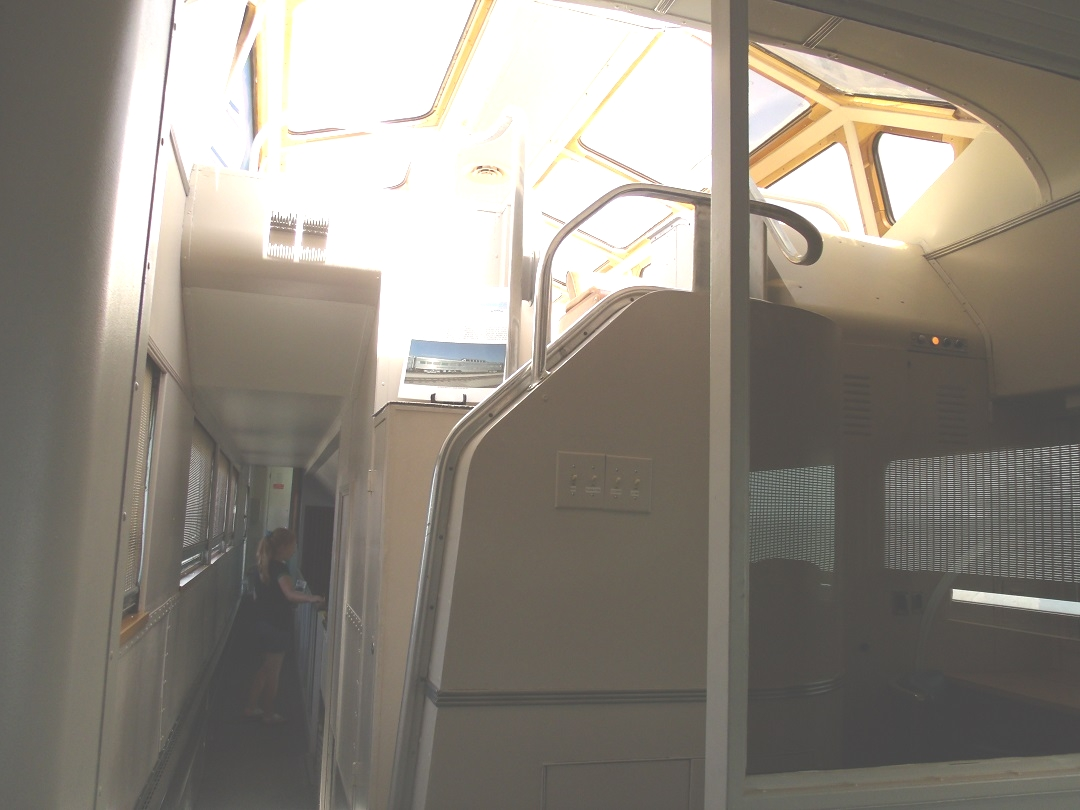
Stairs leading to the "Dome" of the Santa Fe-Plaza Taos.

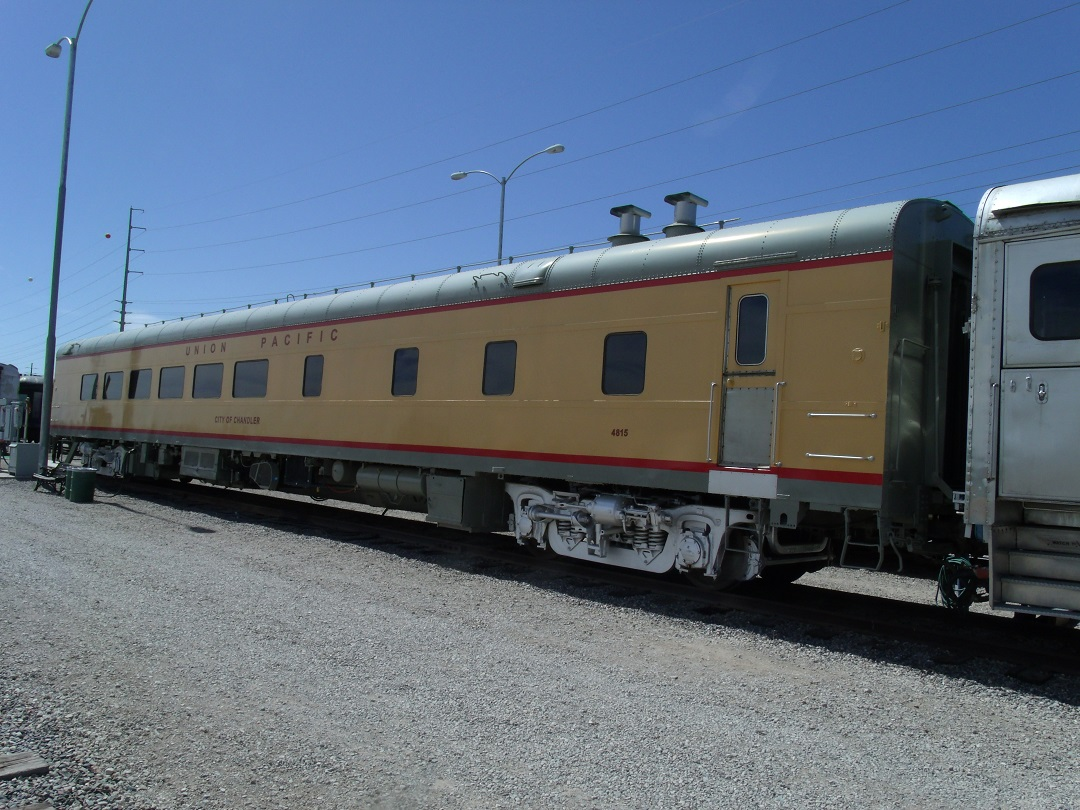
Union Pacific Diner Car.

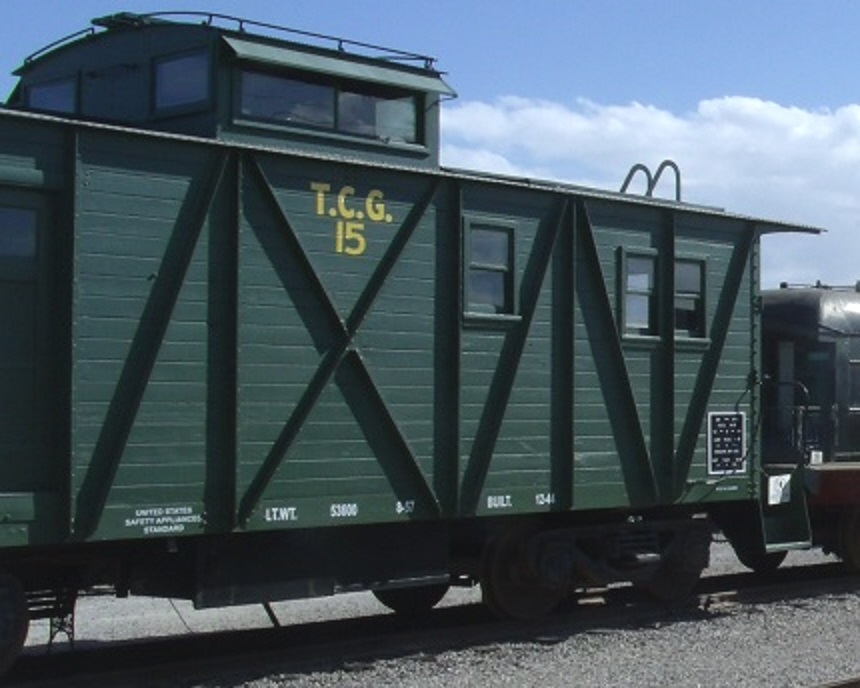
The Tucson, Cornelia & Gila Bend Caboose No. 15..

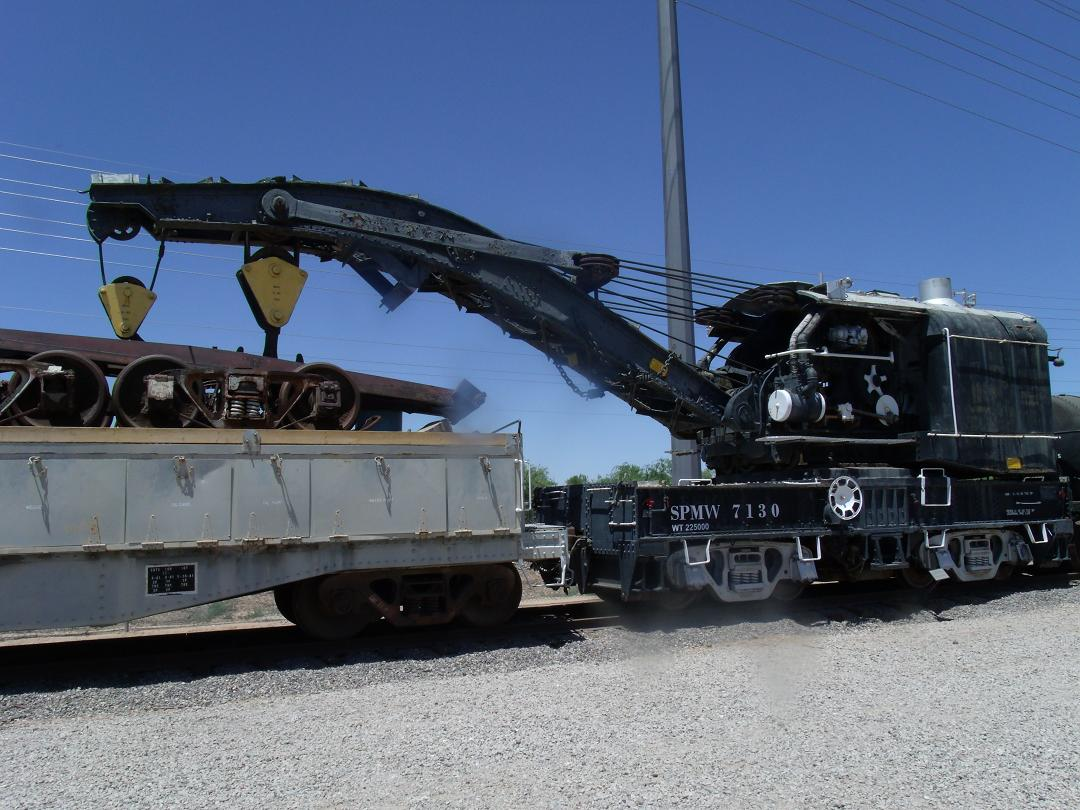
Railroad Steam Wrecking Crane and Tool Car. It is also known as Southern Pacific Railroad Nos.: SPMW 7130/SPMW 7131.

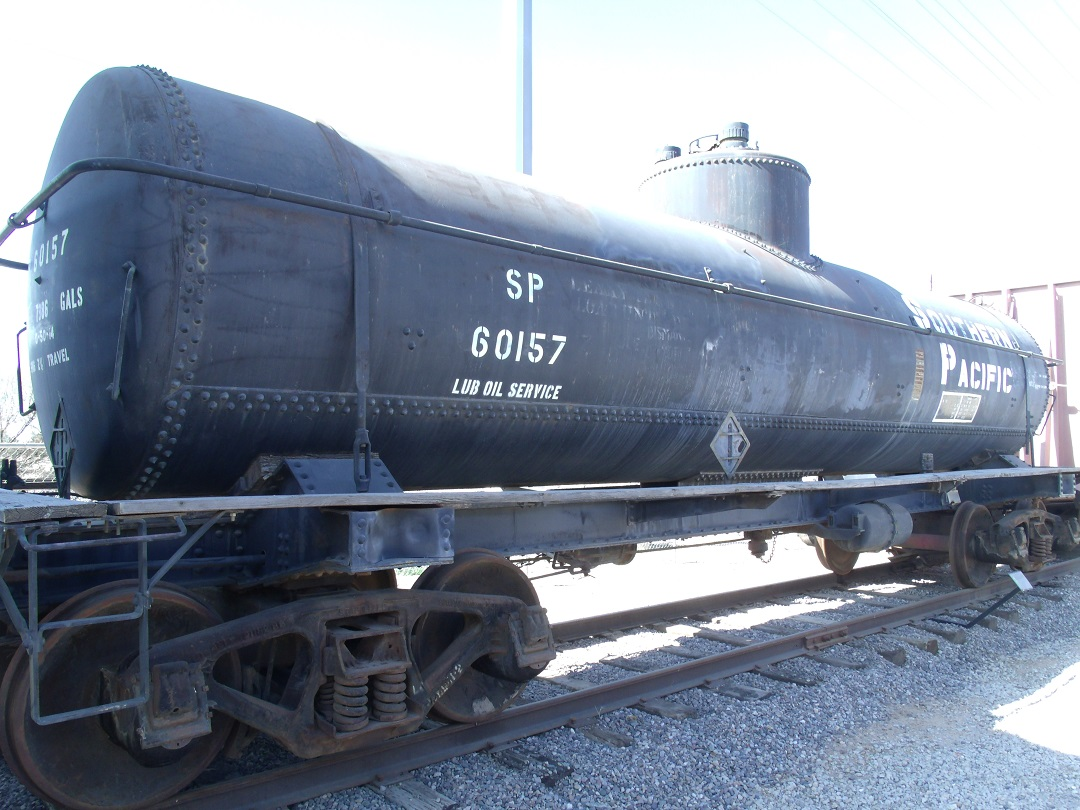
Tank Car UTLX #7682 (PDAX #1057)..

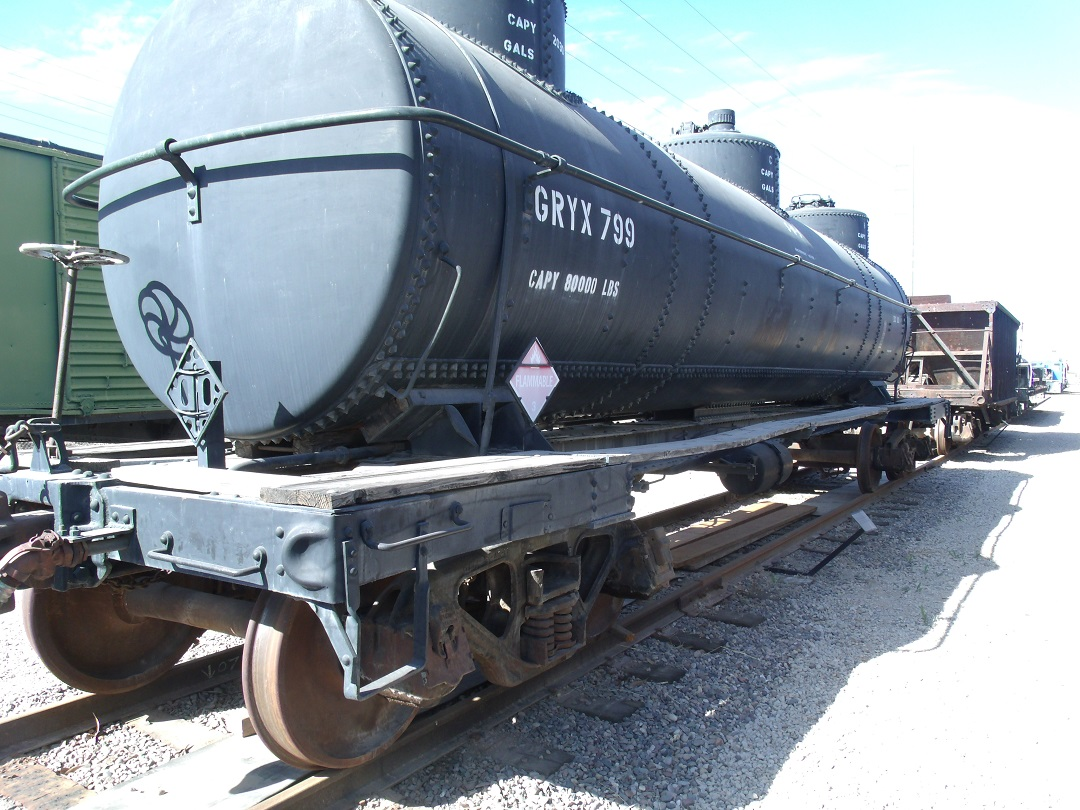
The G.R.Y.X. 799 Tank Car.

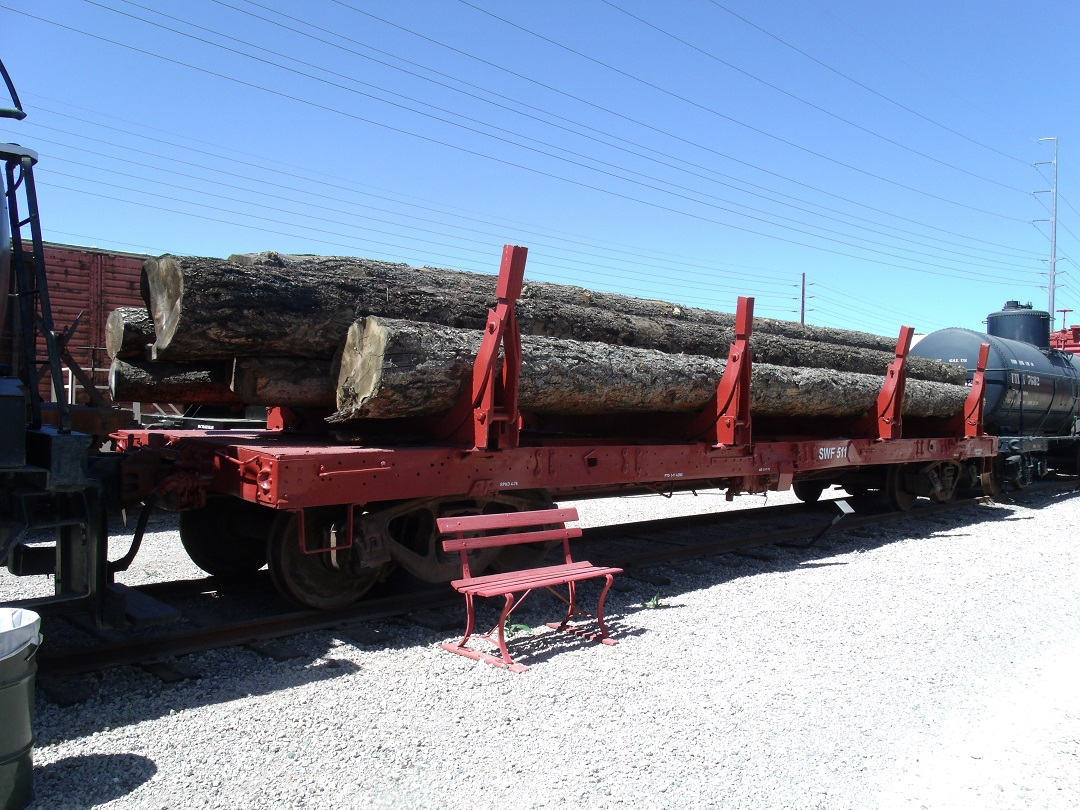
Log Car.

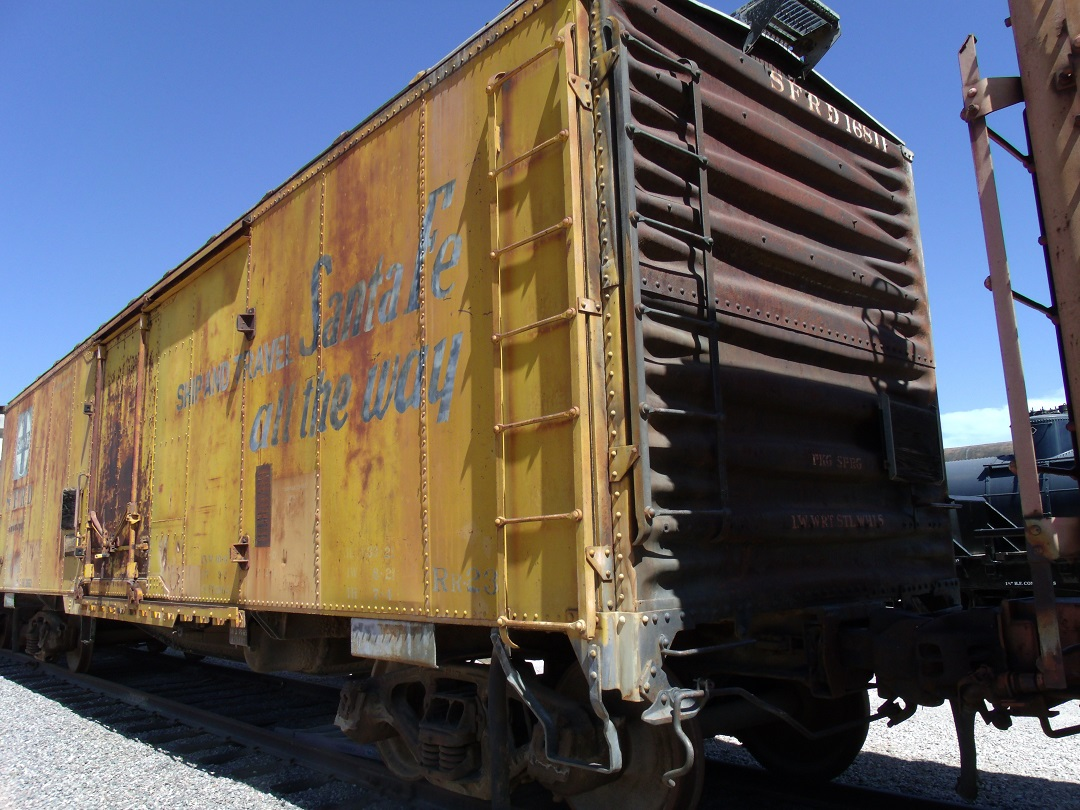
Refrigerator Car .

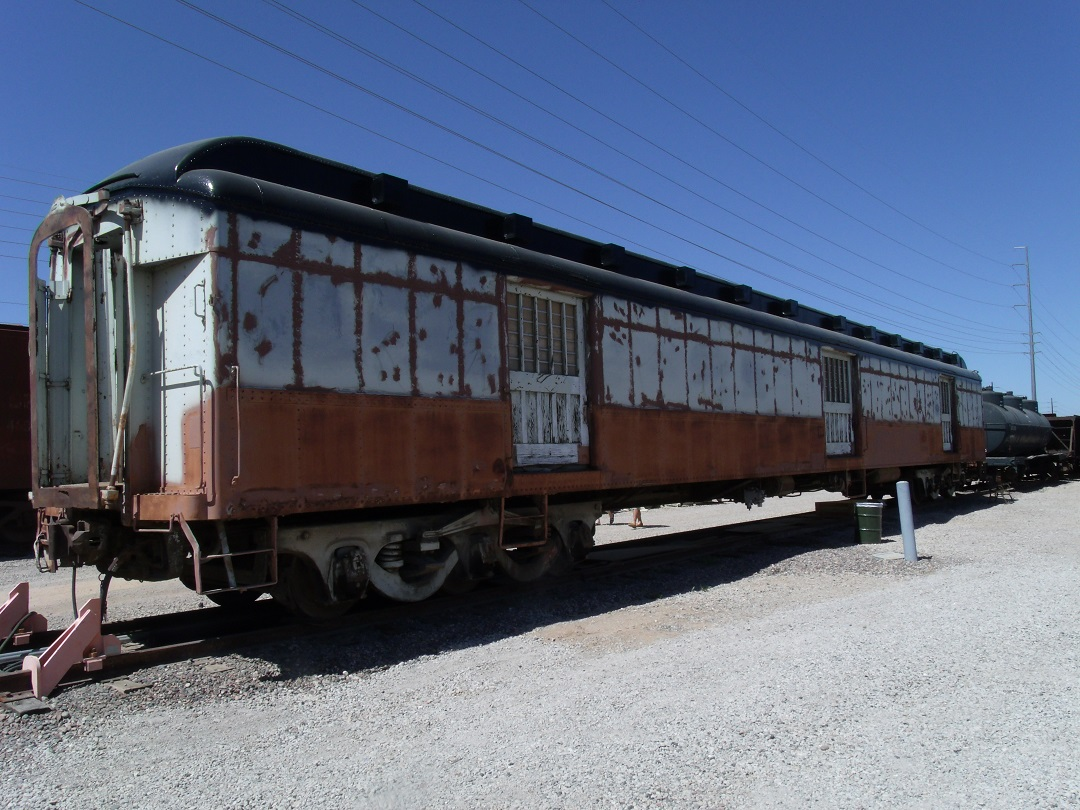
Southern Pacific Horse Car.

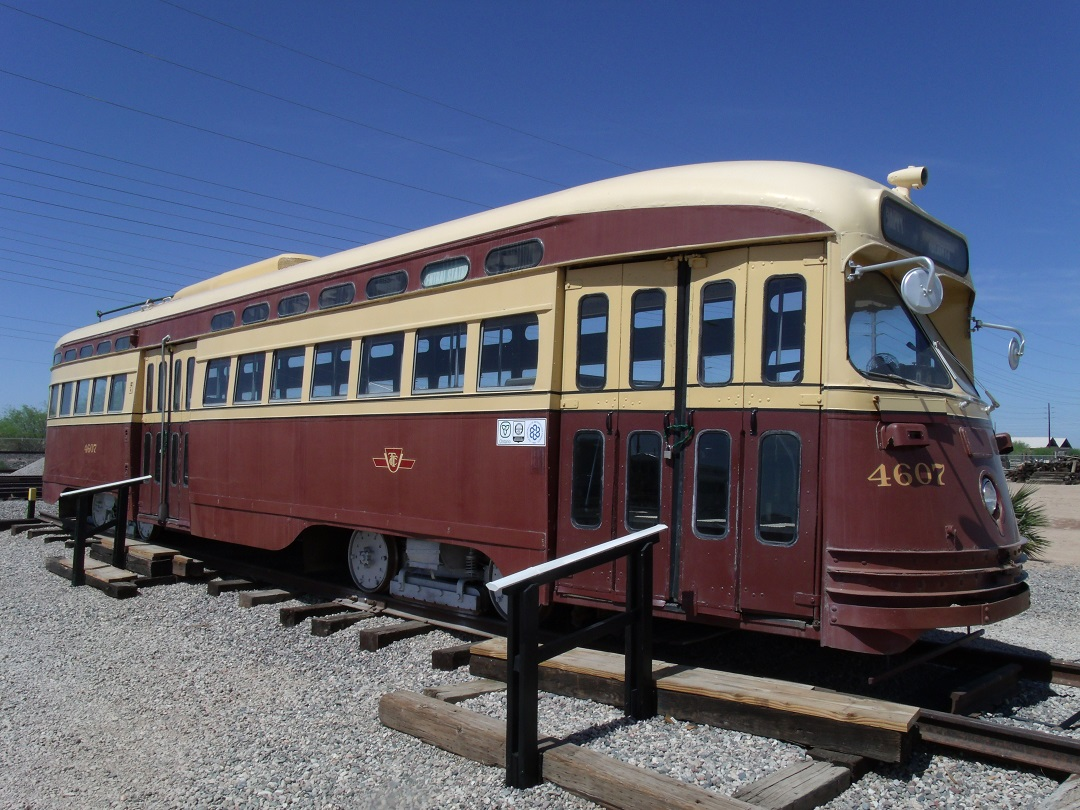
Toronto Transit Street Car.

== See also ==
- National Register of Historic Places listings in Phoenix, Arizona
- National Register of Historic Places listings in Maricopa County, Arizona
